= Endorsements in the 2026 Portuguese presidential election =

This is a list of endorsements made for the 2026 Portuguese presidential election, both in the first and the second rounds.

== First round ==
=== António José Seguro ===
==== Presidents of the Assembly of the Republic ====
- Augusto Santos Silva – former President of the Assembly of the Republic (2022–2024)
- Eduardo Ferro Rodrigues – former President of the Assembly of the Republic (2015–2022); former Secretary-general of the Socialist Party (2002–2004)

==== Ministers ====
- Adalberto Campos Fernandes – former Minister of Health (2015–2018)
- Alberto Martins – former Minister of Justice (2009–2011); former Minister of State Reform (1999–2002); former Member of the Assembly of the Republic (1987–2017)
- Alexandra Leitão – former Minister of State Modernization (2019–2022)
- Ana Jorge – former Minister of Health (2008–2011)
- Ana Mendes Godinho – former Minister of Labour and Social Security (2019–2024)
- Duarte Cordeiro – former Minister of the Environment and Climate Action (2022–2024); former Secretary-general of the Socialist Youth (2008–2010)
- Fernando Medina – former Minister of Finance (2022–2024); former Mayor of Lisbon (2015–2021)
- João Soares – former Minister of Culture (2015–2016); former Mayor of Lisbon (1995–2002); former Member of the Assembly of the Republic (1987–1991; 2002–2019)
- Maria de Belém Roseira – former President of the Socialist Party (2011–2014); former Minister of Equality (1999–2000); former Minister of Health (1995–1999); candidate in the 2016 presidential election
- Nuno Severiano Teixeira – former Minister of National Defence (2006–2009); former Minister of Internal Administration (2000–2002)
- Pedro Nuno Santos – former Secretary-general of the Socialist Party (2002–2004); former Minister of Infrastructure and Housing (1995–1999)
- Ricardo Serrão Santos – former Minister of the Sea (2019–2022); former Member of the European Parliament (2014–2019)

==== Members of Parliament ====
- André Pinotes Batista – incumbent Member of the Assembly of the Republic (since 2015); Chair of the Setúbal Federation of the Socialist Party
- António Galamba – former Member of the Assembly of the Republic (1995–2011)
- António Lacerda Sales – former Member of the Assembly of the Republic (2015–2024); former Secretary of State for Health (2019–2022)
- António Monteirinho – former Member of the Assembly of the Republic (2022–2025)
- António Rebelo de Sousa – former Member of the Assembly of the Republic (1976–1980; 1983–1985); brother of President Marcelo Rebelo de Sousa
- Armando Mourisco – incumbent Member of the Assembly of the Republic (since 2025); former Mayor of Cinfães (2013–2025); Chair of the Viseu Federation of the Socialist Party
- Ascenso Simões – former Member of the Assembly of the Republic (2002–2009; 2015–2022)
- Edite Estrela – former Vice President of the Assembly of the Republic (2019–2024); incumbent Member of the Assembly of the Republic (since 2015; also 1987–1993, 2001–2004)
- Eurico Brilhante Dias – incumbent parliamentary leader of the Socialist Party (since 2025; also 2022–2024); incumbent Member of the Assembly of the Republic (since 2015)
- Filipe Sousa – former President of Together for the People (2015–2024); incumbent Member of the Assembly of the Republic (since 2025)
- Hugo Costa – incumbent Member of the Assembly of the Republic (since 2015); Chair of the Santarém Federation of the Socialist Party
- Inês Sousa Real – incumbent Spokesperson of People Animals Nature (since 2021); incumbent Member of the Assembly of the Republic (since 2019)
- Jamila Madeira – incumbent Member of the Assembly of the Republic (since 2015; also 1999–2004, 2009–2011); former Member of the European Parliament (2004–2009); former Secretary-general of the Socialist Youth (2000–2004)
- João Coimbra – former Member of the Assembly of the Republic (2005–2015); Chair of the Coimbra Federation of the Socialist Party
- Luís Graça – incumbent Member of the Assembly of the Republic (since 2015); Chair of the Faro Federation of the Socialist Party
- Manuel Alegre – incumbent Honorary President of the Socialist Party (since 2024); former Member of the Assembly of the Republic (1975–2009); candidate in the 2006 and 2011 presidential elections
- Marina Gonçalves – incumbent Member of the Assembly of the Republic (since 2019); former Minister of Housing (2023–2024)
- Mário Mourão – incumbent Secretary-general of the General Union of Workers (since 2022); former Member of the Assembly of the Republic (2002–2011)
- Paulo Cafôfo – incumbent President of PS Madeira (since 2023); former Member of the Assembly of the Republic (2024–2025); former Mayor of Funchal (2013–2019)
- Paulo Lopes Silva – incumbent Member of the Assembly of the Republic (since 2025) (national campaign director)
- Pedro do Carmo – incumbent Member of the Assembly of the Republic (since 2025; also 2015–2024); former Mayor of Ourique (2005–2015)
- Pedro Sousa – incumbent Member of the Assembly of the Republic (since 2024)
- Ricardo Gonçalves – former Member of the Assembly of the Republic (1999–2015)
- Rui Santos – incumbent Member of the Assembly of the Republic (since 2025); former Mayor of Vila Real (2013–2025); Chair of the Vila Real Federation of the Socialist Party
- Sérgio Sousa Pinto – former Member of the Assembly of the Republic (1995–1999; 2009–2025); former Secretary-general of the Socialist Youth (1994–2000)
- Sofia Pereira – incumbent Secretary-general of the Socialist Youth (since 2024); incumbent Member of the Assembly of the Republic (since 2025)

==== Members of the European Parliament ====
- Ana Gomes – former Member of the European Parliament (2004–2019); candidate in the 2021 presidential election
- André Rodrigues – incumbent Member of the European Parliament (since 2024)
- Bruno Gonçalves – incumbent Member of the European Parliament (since 2024)
- Francisco Assis – incumbent Member of the European Parliament (since 2024; also 2004–2009, 2014–2019); former Member of the Assembly of the Republic (1995–2004; 2009–2014; 2024); former Mayor of Amarante (1989–1995)
- Manuel dos Santos – former Member of the European Parliament (2001–2009; 2016–2019)
- Sérgio Gonçalves – incumbent Member of the European Parliament (since 2024)

==== Presidents of Regional Governments ====
- Carlos César – incumbent President of the Socialist Party (since 2014); former President of the Regional Government of the Azores (1996–2012)

==== Mayors ====
- Alexandre Favaios – incumbent Mayor of Vila Real (since 2025)
- Alexandre Lote – incumbent Mayor of Fornos de Algodres (since 2025); Chair of the Guarda Federation of the Socialist Party
- Armindo Jacinto – former Mayor of Idanha-a-Nova (2013–2025)
- Benjamin Rodrigues – former Mayor of Macedo de Cavaleiros (2017–2025); Chair of the Bragança Federation of the Socialist Party
- Carlos Zorrinho – incumbent Mayor of Évora (since 2025); former Member of the European Parliament (2014–2024); former parliamentary leader of the Socialist Party (2011–2013)
- Domingos Bragança – former Mayor of Guimarães (2013–2025)
- Fernando Costa – former Mayor of Caldas da Rainha (1986–2013)
- Gonçalo Lopes – incumbent Mayor of Leiria (since 2019); Chair of the Leiria Federation of the Socialist Party
- Joaquim Raposo – former Mayor of Amadora (1997–2013)
- Leopoldo Rodrigues – incumbent Mayor of Castelo Branco (since 2021)
- Luís Filipe Araújo – incumbent Mayor of Gondomar (since 2025)
- Luísa Salgueiro – incumbent Mayor of Matosinhos (since 2017); former President of the National Association of Portuguese Municipalities (2021–2025)
- Paulo Arsénio – incumbent Mayor of Beja (since 2017)
- Pedro Ribeiro – former Mayor of Almeirim (2013–2025)
- Rui Solheiro – former Mayor of Melgaço (1979–2009)
- Vítor Ferreira – incumbent Mayor of Amadora (since 2024)
- Vítor Marques – incumbent Mayor of Caldas da Rainha (since 2021)
- Vítor Pereira – former Mayor of Covilhã (2013–2025); Chair of the Castelo Branco Federation of the Socialist Party
- And other 91 incumbent mayors

==== Other individuals ====
- Alfredo Cruz – Lieutenant general of the Air Force
- Álvaro Beleza – President of SEDES
- Augusto Pinto – Admiral of the Navy
- João Varandas Fernandes – physician; incumbent Vice President of CDS – People's Party
- José Abraão – incumbent Vice President of the General Union of Workers
- José Faria e Costa – former Ombudsman (2013–2017)
- Luís Represas – singer and composer
- Manuel Monge – General of the Army
- Nuno Miguel Henriques – former city councillor of Alenquer (2021–2025)
- Paulo de Morais – former Deputy Mayor of Porto (2001–2005); candidate in the 2016 presidential election
- Ricardo Valente – former city councillor of Porto (2013–2025)
- Rui Vieira de Castro – Rector of the University of Minho

==== Political parties ====
- Socialist Party
- Volt Portugal

=== André Ventura ===
==== Ministers ====
- Rui Gomes da Silva – former Minister of Parliamentary Affairs (2004)

==== Members of Parliament ====
- Bernardo Pessanha – incumbent Member of the Assembly of the Republic (since 2024)
- Bruno Nunes – incumbent Member of the Assembly of the Republic (since 2022)
- Carlos Barbosa – incumbent Member of the Assembly of the Republic (since 2024)
- Cristina Rodrigues – incumbent Member of the Assembly of the Republic (since 2024; also 2019–2022)
- Eliseu Neves – incumbent Member of the Assembly of the Republic (since 2024)
- João Aleixo – incumbent Member of the Assembly of the Republic (since 2025)
- José Dias Fernandes – incumbent Member of the Assembly of the Republic (since 2024)
- Marta Martins da Silva – incumbent Member of the Assembly of the Republic (since 2024)
- Nuno Simões de Melo – incumbent Member of the Assembly of the Republic (since 2024)
- Patrícia Almeida – incumbent Member of the Assembly of the Republic (since 2024)
- Pedro Pessanha – incumbent Member of the Assembly of the Republic (since 2022)
- Ricardo Dias Pinto – incumbent Member of the Assembly of the Republic (since 2024)
- Ricardo Reis – incumbent Member of the Assembly of the Republic (since 2025)
- Rita Matias – incumbent Member of the Assembly of the Republic (since 2022); incumbent President of Chega Youth (since 2021)
- Sónia Monteiro – incumbent Member of the Assembly of the Republic (since 2024)

==== Mayors ====
- Rui Cristina – incumbent Mayor of Albufeira (since 2025)

==== Political parties ====
- Chega

=== João Cotrim de Figueiredo ===
==== Prime Ministers ====
- Pedro Santana Lopes – incumbent Mayor of Figueira da Foz (since 2021); former Prime Minister (2004–2005); former President of the Social Democratic Party (2004–2005)

==== Members of Parliament ====
- Carlos Guimarães Pinto – former President of the Liberal Initiative (2018–2019); incumbent Member of the Assembly of the Republic (since 2022)
- Henrique de Freitas – former Member of the Assembly of the Republic (1999–2009; 2024–2025)
- Liliana Reis – former Member of the Assembly of the Republic (2024–2025)
- Mariana Leitão – incumbent President of the Liberal Initiative (since 2025); incumbent Member of the Assembly of the Republic (since 2024)
- Mário Amorim Lopes – incumbent parliamentary leader of the Liberal Initiative (since 2025); incumbent Member of the Assembly of the Republic (since 2024)
- Michael Seufert – former Member of the Assembly of the Republic (2009–2015)
- Nuno Freitas – former Member of the Assembly of the Republic (1999–2002)
- Walter Teixeira – former Member of the Assembly of the Republic (1987–1991)

==== Other individuals ====
- António Nogueira Leite – former Secretary of State for Treasury (1999–2000)
- Nuno Afonso – former Vice President of Chega
- Pedro Silva Martins – former Secretary of State for Employment (2011–2013)

==== Political parties ====
- Liberal Initiative

=== Henrique Gouveia e Melo ===
==== Prime Ministers ====
- José Sócrates – former Prime Minister (2005–2011); former Secretary-general of the Socialist Party (2004–2011)

==== Ministers ====
- Ângelo Correia – former Minister of Internal Administration (1981–1983)
- António Martins da Cruz – former Minister of Foreign Affairs (2002–2003)
- David Justino – former Minister of Education (2002–2004)
- Fernando Negrão – former Minister of Justice (2015); former Minister of Social Security (2004–2005)
- Henrique Chaves – former Minister Adjunct (2004)
- Miguel Cadilhe – former Minister of Finance (1985–1990)
- ~~Rui Gomes da Silva – former Minister of Parliamentary Affairs (2004)~~ (switched his endorsement to André Ventura)

==== Members of Parliament ====
- Adão Silva – former Vice President of the Assembly of the Republic (2022–2024); former Member of the Assembly of the Republic (1987–2024)
- André Pardal – former Member of the Assembly of the Republic (2011–2015)
- Diogo Leão – former Member of the Assembly of the Republic (2015–2024)
- Isabel Meirelles – former Member of the Assembly of the Republic (2019–2024)
- Manuela Aguiar – former Vice President of the Assembly of the Republic (1987–1991); former Member of the Assembly of the Republic (1980–2005)
- Mónica Quintela – former Member of the Assembly of the Republic (2019–2024)
- Paulo Mota Pinto – former parliamentary leader of the Social Democratic Party (2022); former Member of the Assembly of the Republic (2009–2015; 2022–2024)
- Ricardo Pinheiro – former Member of the Assembly of the Republic (2019–2025)

==== Members of the European Parliament ====
- José Ribeiro e Castro – former President of the CDS – People's Party (2005–2007); former Member of the European Parliament (1999–2009)

==== Presidents of Regional Governments ====
- Alberto João Jardim – former President of the Regional Government of Madeira (1978–2015)

==== Mayors ====
- António Carmona Rodrigues – former Mayor of Lisbon (2004–2005; 2005–2007)
- António Capucho – former Mayor of Cascais (2001–2011); former Minister of Parliamentary Affairs (1987–1989); former Minister of Quality of Life (1983–1984)
- Carlos Carreiras – former Mayor of Cascais (2013–2025)
- Fernando Seara – former Mayor of Sintra (2001–2013)
- Isaltino Morais – incumbent Mayor of Oeiras (since 2017; also 1986–2002, 2005–2013); former Minister of Cities, Territorial Organization and Environment (2002–2003)
- Rui Rio – former President of the Social Democratic Party (2018–2022); former Mayor of Porto (2002–2013) (national campaign chair)

==== Other individuals ====
- Ana Rita Cavaco – former president of the Order of Nurses
- Daniel Adrião – candidate for the leadership of the Socialist Party in 2016, 2018, 2021 and 2023
- Francisco George – former Director-General of Health (2005–2018)
- Francisco Rodrigues dos Santos – former President of the CDS – People's Party (2020–2022)
- José Manuel Rodrigues – Chair of the Madeira Federation of CDS – People's Party
- Mário Ferreira – businessman; owner of Media Capital
- Melo Gomes – Admiral of the Navy; former Chief of the Naval Staff (2005–2010)
- Paulo Otero – university professor
- Paulo Estêvão – former President of the People's Monarchist Party (2010–2017)

==== Political parties ====
- People's Monarchist Party

=== Luís Marques Mendes ===
==== Presidents of the Republic ====
- Aníbal Cavaco Silva – former President of the Republic (2006–2016); former Prime Minister (1985–1995); former President of the Social Democratic Party (1985–1995)

==== Prime Ministers ====
- Francisco Pinto Balsemão – former Prime Minister (1981–1983); former President of the Social Democratic Party (1980–1983) (deceased)
- José Manuel Durão Barroso – former President of the European Commission (2004–2014); former Prime Minister (2002–2004); former President of the Social Democratic Party (1999–2004)
- Luís Montenegro – incumbent Prime Minister (since 2024); incumbent President of the Social Democratic Party (since 2022); former parliamentary leader of the Social Democratic Party (2010–2017)

==== Ministers ====
- António Leitão Amaro – incumbent Minister of the Presidency (since 2024)
- Carlos Abreu Amorim – incumbent Minister of Parliamentary Affairs (since 2025)
- Carlos Tavares – former Minister of the Economy (2002–2004)
- Gonçalo Matias – incumbent Minister of State Reform (since 2025)
- Graça Carvalho – incumbent Minister of the Environment (since 2024); former Minister of Science and Higher Education (2003–2005); former Member of the European Parliament (2009–2014; 2014–2024)
- Joaquim Miranda Sarmento – incumbent Minister of Finance (since 2024); former parliamentary leader of the Social Democratic Party (2022–2024)
- José Manuel Fernandes – incumbent Minister of Agriculture (since 2024); former Member of the European Parliament (2009–2024); former Mayor of Vila Verde (1997–2009)
- José Silva Peneda – former Member of the European Parliament (2004–2009); former Minister of Labour and Social Security (1987–1993)
- Leonor Beleza – former Minister of Health (1985–1990)
- Luís Mira Amaral – former Minister of Industry and Energy (1987–1995); former Minister of Labour and Social Security (1985–1987)
- Manuel Castro Almeida – incumbent Minister of the Economy (since 2025) and Territorial Cohesion (since 2024); former Mayor of São João da Madeira (2001–2013)
- Manuela Ferreira Leite – former President of the Social Democratic Party (2008–2010); former Minister of Finance (2002–2004); former Minister of Education (1993–1995)
- Margarida Blasco – former Minister of Internal Administration (2024–2025)
- Miguel Poiares Maduro – former Minister of Regional Development (2013–2015)
- Miguel Relvas – former Minister of Parliamentary Affairs (2011–2013)
- Paula Teixeira da Cruz – former Minister of Justice (2011–2015)
- Paulo Rangel – incumbent Minister of Foreign Affairs (since 2024); former Member of the European Parliament (2009–2024); former parliamentary leader of the Social Democratic Party (2008–2009)
- Pedro Mota Soares – former Minister of Solidarity, Employment and Social Security (2011–2015)
- Rosário Palma Ramalho – incumbent Minister of Labour, Solidarity and Social Security (since 2024)
- Rui Medeiros – former Minister of Administrative Modernization (2015)
- Teresa Patrício Gouveia – former Minister of Foreign Affairs (2003–2004); former Minister of the Environment (1993–1995)

==== Members of Parliament ====
- Alexandre Poço – incumbent Member of the Assembly of the Republic (since 2019); former President of the Social Democratic Youth (2020–2024)
- Carla Castro – former Member of the Assembly of the Republic (2022–2024)
- Duarte Marques – former Member of the Assembly of the Republic (2011–2022); former President of the Social Democratic Youth (2010–2012) (national campaign director)
- Guilherme Silva – former Vice President of the Assembly of the Republic (2005–2015); former Member of the Assembly of the Republic (1987–2015)
- Hugo Soares – incumbent parliamentary leader of the Social Democratic Party (since 2024; also 2017–2018); incumbent Member of the Assembly of the Republic (since 2024; also 2011–2019); former President of the Social Democratic Youth (2012–2014)
- João Sobrinho Teixeira – former Member of the Assembly of the Republic (2022–2024); forrner Secretary of State for Science, Technology and Higher Education (2019–2022)
- José Gomes Mendes – former Secretary of State for Planning (2015–2022); former Member of the Assembly of the Republic (2019–2022)
- José Nunes Liberato – former Member of the Assembly of the Republic (1987–1995); chief of staff of President Aníbal Cavaco Silva
- José Pacheco Pereira – former parliamentary leader of the Social Democratic Party (1995); former Member of the Assembly of the Republic (1987–1999; 2009–2011)
- Maurício Marques – incumbent Member of the Assembly of the Republic (since 2024; also 2011–2019); former Mayor of Penacova (1997–2009)

==== Members of the European Parliament ====
- Diogo Feio – former Member of the European Parliament (2014–2019)
- Hélder Sousa Silva – incumbent Member of the European Parliament (since 2024); former Mayor of Mafra (2013–2025)
- Lídia Pereira – incumbent Member of the European Parliament (since 2019)
- Luís Queiró – former Member of the European Parliament (2004–2009)
- Paulo Cunha – incumbent Member of the European Parliament (since 2024)
- Sebastião Bugalho – incumbent Member of the European Parliament (since 2024)

==== Presidents of Regional Governments ====
- José Manuel Bolieiro – incumbent President of the Regional Government of the Azores (since 2020); former Mayor of Ponta Delgada (2012–2020)
- Miguel Albuquerque – incumbent President of the Regional Government of Madeira (since 2015); former Mayor of Funchal (1994–2013)

==== Mayors ====
- Antero Barbosa – incumbent Mayor of Fafe (since 2021)
- Artur Torres Pereira – former Mayor of Sousel (1979–1995); former President of the National Association of Portuguese Municipalities (1986–1990)
- Carlos Encarnação – former Mayor of Coimbra (2001–2010)
- Carlos Moedas – incumbent Mayor of Lisboa (since 2021)
- César Figueiredo – incumbent Mayor of Mêda (since 2025)
- Isabel Damasceno – former Mayor of Leiria (1998–2009)
- João Paulo Barbosa de Melo – former Mayor of Coimbra (2010–2013)
- José Macário Correia – former Mayor of Faro (2009–2013); former Mayor of Tavira (1997–2009)
- Luís Souto Miranda – incumbent Mayor of Aveiro (since 2025)
- Maria das Dores Meira – incumbent Mayor of Setúbal (since 2025; also 2006–2021)
- Pedro Duarte – incumbent Mayor of Porto (since 2025); former Minister of Parliamentary Affairs (2024–2025); Chair of the Porto Federation of the Social Democratic Party
- Rui Moreira – former Mayor of Porto (2013–2025) (national campaign chair)

==== Other individuals ====
- Alice Vieira – writer
- André Sampaio – economist, son of former President Jorge Sampaio
- António Sala – radio and television presenter
- Isabel Jonet – president of the Portuguese Federation of Food Banks
- João Perestrello – President of SEDES Youth
- José Cardoso da Costa – former President of the Constitutional Court (1989–2003)
- Júlio Isidro – television presenter
- Manuela Ramalho Eanes – former First Lady (1976–1986)
- Raquel Vaz Pinto – university professor
- Toy – singer

==== Political parties ====
- Social Democratic Party
- CDS – People's Party

=== Catarina Martins ===
==== Members of Parliament ====
- Fabian Figueiredo – incumbent Member of the Assembly of the Republic (since 2026; also 2021, 2024–2025); former parliamentary leader of the Left Bloc (2024–2025)
- Fernando Rosas – former Member of the Assembly of the Republic (2001–2002; 2005–2010); candidate in the 2001 presidential election
- Francisco Louçã – former Coordinator of the Left Bloc (1999–2012); former Member of the Assembly of the Republic (1999–2012); candidate in the 2006 presidential election
- Isabel Moreira – incumbent Member of the Assembly of the Republic (since 2011)
- Joana Mortágua – former Member of the Assembly of the Republic (2015–2025)
- José Manuel Pureza – incumbent Coordinator of the Left Bloc (since 2025); former Vice President of the Assembly of the Republic (2015–2022); former Member of the Assembly of the Republic (2009–2011; 2015–2022)
- Mariana Mortágua – former Coordinator of the Left Bloc (2023–2025); former Member of the Assembly of the Republic (2013–2026)
- Pedro Filipe Soares – former parliamentary leader of the Left Bloc (2012–2024); former Member of the Assembly of the Republic (2009–2024)

==== Members of the European Parliament ====
- Marisa Matias – former Member of the European Parliament (2009–2024); candidate in the 2016 and 2021 presidential elections

==== Political parties ====
- Left Bloc

=== António Filipe ===
==== Members of Parliament ====
- Carlos Carvalhas – former Secretary-general of the Portuguese Communist Party (1992–2004); former Member of the Assembly of the Republic (1976–1980; 1983–2005); candidate in the 1991 presidential election
- Jerónimo de Sousa – former Secretary-general of the Portuguese Communist Party (2004–2022); former Member of the Assembly of the Republic (1975–1995; 1995–2022); candidate in the 1996 and 2006 presidential elections
- Joacine Katar Moreira – former Member of the Assembly of the Republic (2019–2022)
- Manuel Loff – former Member of the Assembly of the Republic (2023)
- Paulo Raimundo – incumbent Secretary-general of the Portuguese Communist Party (since 2022); incumbent Member of the Assembly of the Republic (since 2024)
- Rita Rato – former Member of the Assembly of the Republic (2009–2019)

==== Members of the European Parliament ====
- João Ferreira – former Member of the European Parliament (2009–2021); candidate in the 2021 presidential election
- João Oliveira – incumbent Member of the European Parliament (since 2024)
- José Barata-Moura – former Member of the European Parliament (1993–1994)

==== Mayors ====
- Bernardino Soares – former Mayor of Loures (2013–2021); former parliamentary leader of the Portuguese Communist Party (2001–2013)

==== Other individuals ====
- Álvaro Siza Vieira – architect
- Constança Cunha e Sá – journalist (deceased)
- Francisco Geraldes – footballer
- Isabel Camarinha – former Secretary-general of the CGTP-IN (2020–2024)
- Vitorino Salomé – singer

==== Political parties ====
- Portuguese Communist Party
- Ecologist Party "The Greens"

=== Jorge Pinto ===
==== Members of Parliament ====
- Filipa Pinto – incumbent Member of the Assembly of the Republic (since 2025)
- Isabel Mendes Lopes – incumbent parliamentary leader of LIVRE (since 2024); incumbent Member of the Assembly of the Republic (since 2024)
- Patrícia Gonçalves – incumbent Member of the Assembly of the Republic (since 2025)
- Rui Tavares – incumbent Spokesperson of LIVRE (since 2022); incumbent Member of the Assembly of the Republic (since 2022); former Member of the European Parliament (2009–2014)

==== Political parties ====
- LIVRE

== Second round ==
=== António José Seguro ===
==== Presidents of the Republic ====
- Aníbal Cavaco Silva – former President of the Republic (2006–2016); former Prime Minister (1985–1995); former President of the Social Democratic Party (1985–1995)
- António Ramalho Eanes – former President of the Republic (1976–1986)

==== Prime Ministers ====
- António Costa – incumbent President of the European Council (since 2024); former Prime Minister (2015–2024); former Secretary-general of the Socialist Party (2014–2024)

==== Presidents of the Assembly of the Republic ====
- João Bosco Mota Amaral – former President of the Assembly of the Republic (2002–2005); former President of the Regional Government of the Azores (1976–1995)

==== Ministers ====
- António Pires de Lima – former Minister of the Economy (2013–2015)
- Arlindo Cunha – former Minister of the Environment (2004); Minister of Agriculture (1990–1994); former Member of the European Parliament (1994–2003)
- Assunção Cristas – former President of the CDS – People's Party (2016–2020); former Minister of Agriculture (2011–2015)
- Daniel Proença de Carvalho – former Minister of Social Communication (1978–1979)
- David Justino – former Minister of Education (2002–2004)
- Leonor Beleza – former Minister of Health (1985–1990)
- Luís Marques Mendes – former President of the Social Democratic Party (2005–2007); former Minister of Parliamentary Affairs (2002–2004); candidate in the first round of the 2026 presidential election
- Manuela Ferreira Leite – former President of the Social Democratic Party (2008–2010); former Minister of Finance (2002–2004); former Minister of Education (1993–1995)
- Miguel Poiares Maduro – former Minister of Regional Development (2013–2015)
- Paulo Portas – former President of the CDS – People's Party (1998–2005; 2007–2016); former Deputy Prime Minister (2013–2015); former Minister of Foreign Affairs (2011–2015); former Minister of National Defence (2002–2005)
- Pedro Mota Soares – former Minister of Solidarity, Employment and Social Security (2011–2015)

==== Members of Parliament ====
- Adolfo Mesquita Nunes – former Member of the Assembly of the Republic (2011–2013)
- André Coelho Lima – former Member of the Assembly of the Republic (2019–2024)
- António Filipe – former Vice President of the Assembly of the Republic (2002–2009; 2011–2015; 2019–2022); former Member of the Assembly of the Republic (1987–2022; 2024–2025); candidate in the first round of the 2026 presidential election
- António Lobo Xavier – former parliamentary leader of the CDS – People's Party (1992–1994); former Member of the Assembly of the Republic (1983–1987; 1991–1999)
- Carlos Guimarães Pinto – former President of the Liberal Initiative (2018–2019); incumbent Member of the Assembly of the Republic (since 2022)
- Cecília Meireles – former parliamentary leader of the CDS – People's Party (2019–2020); former Member of the Assembly of the Republic (2009–2022)
- Cristóvão Norte – incumbent Member of the Assembly of the Republic (since 2024; also 2011–2022)
- Duarte Marques – former Member of the Assembly of the Republic (2011–2022); former President of the Social Democratic Youth (2010–2012)
- Filipa Roseta – former Member of the Assembly of the Republic (2019–2021)
- Guilherme Silva – former Vice President of the Assembly of the Republic (2005–2015); former Member of the Assembly of the Republic (1987–2015)
- José Eduardo Martins – former Member of the Assembly of the Republic (1999–2011)
- José Manuel Pureza – incumbent Coordinator of the Left Bloc (since 2025); former Vice President of the Assembly of the Republic (2015–2022); former Member of the Assembly of the Republic (2009–2011; 2015–2022)
- Jorge Pinto – incumbent Member of the Assembly of the Republic (since 2024); candidate in the first round of the 2026 presidential election
- José Pacheco Pereira – former parliamentary leader of the Social Democratic Party (1995); former Member of the Assembly of the Republic (1987–1999; 2009–2011)
- Mariana Leitão – incumbent President of the Liberal Initiative (since 2025); incumbent Member of the Assembly of the Republic (since 2024)
- Mário Amorim Lopes – incumbent parliamentary leader of the Liberal Initiative (since 2025); incumbent Member of the Assembly of the Republic (since 2024)
- Paulo Raimundo – incumbent Secretary-general of the Portuguese Communist Party (since 2022); incumbent Member of the Assembly of the Republic (since 2024)
- Rodrigo Saraiva – incumbent Vice President of the Assembly of the Republic (since 2024); incumbent Member of the Assembly of the Republic (since 2022)

==== Members of the European Parliament ====
- Carlos Coelho – former Member of the European Parliament (1994; 1998–2019; 2023–2024); former President of the Social Democratic Youth (1986–1990)
- Carlos Pimenta – former Member of the European Parliament (1987–1999)
- Catarina Martins – incumbent Member of the European Parliament (since 2024); former Coordinator of the Left Bloc (2012–2023); candidate in the first round of the 2026 presidential election
- Diogo Feio – former Member of the European Parliament (2014–2019)
- Marta Temido – incumbent Member of the European Parliament (since 2024); former Minister of Health (2019–2022)

==== Mayors ====
- António Capucho – former Mayor of Cascais (2001–2011); former Minister of Parliamentary Affairs (1987–1989); former Minister of Quality of Life (1983–1984)
- Carlos Moedas – incumbent Mayor of Lisbon (since 2021)
- Francisco Moita Flores – former Mayor of Santarém (2005–2012)
- Isaltino Morais – incumbent Mayor of Oeiras (since 2017; also 1986–2002, 2005–2013); former Minister of Cities, Territorial Organization and Environment (2002–2003)
- Pedro Duarte – incumbent Mayor of Porto (since 2025); former Minister of Parliamentary Affairs (2024–2025); Chair of the Porto Federation of the Social Democratic Party
- Rui Moreira – former Mayor of Porto (2013–2025)
- Rui Rio – former President of the Social Democratic Party (2018–2022); former Mayor of Porto (2002–2013)

==== Other individuals ====
- André Pestana – leader of the Union of All Education Professionals (STOP); candidate in the first round of the 2026 presidential election
- António Nogueira Leite – former Secretary of State for Treasury (1999–2000)
- Francisco Rodrigues dos Santos – former President of the CDS – People's Party (2020–2022)
- Graça Freitas – former Director-general of Health (2018–2023)
- Henrique Gouveia e Melo – former Chief of the Naval Staff (2021–2024); candidate in the first round of the 2026 presidential election
- João Maria Jonet – incumbent City Councillor of Cascais (since 2025)
- José Miguel Júdice – national campaign chair of João Cotrim de Figueiredo's presidential campaign
- Miguel Esteves Cardoso – writer and journalist

==== Political parties ====
- LIVRE
- Portuguese Communist Party
- Left Bloc
- People Animals Nature
- Ecologist Party "The Greens"

=== André Ventura ===
==== Ministers ====
- Henrique Chaves – former Minister Adjunct (2004)

==== Other individuals ====
- Ossanda Liber – incumbent President of New Right (since 2024)

==== Political parties ====
- National Democratic Alternative

== Endorsements from foreign politicians and organizations ==
=== António José Seguro ===
==== Foreign heads of government ====
- Stefan Löfven – former Prime Minister of Sweden (2014–2021)

==== Foreign politicians ====
- Iratxe García – incumbent Member of the European Parliament (since 2004); leader of the Progressive Alliance of Socialists and Democrats (since 2019)

==== Foreign political parties ====
- Workers Party of Brazil

==== Transnational political groups ====
- Party of European Socialists
- Progressive Alliance of Socialists and Democrats
- Socialist International

=== André Ventura ===
==== Foreign heads of government ====
- Viktor Orbán – incumbent Prime Minister of Hungary (2010–2026; also 1998–2002)

==== Foreign politicians ====
- Bia Kicis – incumbent Member of the Brazilian Chamber of Deputies (since 2019)
- Carlos Jordy – incumbent Member of the Brazilian Chamber of Deputies (since 2019)
- Caroline de Toni – incumbent Member of the Brazilian Chamber of Deputies (since 2019)
- Eduardo Bolsonaro – former Member of the Brazilian Chamber of Deputies (2015–2025); son of former President Jair Bolsonaro
- Flávio Bolsonaro – candidate for President of Brazil in 2026; Federal Senator (since 2019); son of former President Jair Bolsonaro
- Geert Wilders – leader of the Dutch Party for Freedom (since 2006)
- Jordan Bardella – incumbent Member of the European Parliament (since 2019); leader of the French National Rally (since 2022); leader of Patriots for Europe (since 2024)
- Julia Zanatta – incumbent Member of the Brazilian Chamber of Deputies (since 2023)
- Marine Le Pen – candidate for President of France in 2012, 2017 and 2022; former leader of the National Rally (2011–2021)
- Matteo Salvini – Deputy Prime Minister of Italy (since 2022; also 2018–2019); leader of Lega (since 2013)
- Santiago Abascal – leader of the Spanish Vox (since 2014)
- Tom Van Grieken – leader of the Belgian Vlaams Belang (since 2014)

==== Transnational political groups ====
- Patriots for Europe

=== João Cotrim de Figueiredo ===
==== Foreign heads of government ====
- Rob Jetten – Prime Minister-designate of the Netherlands; leader of the Dutch Democrats 66 (since 2023)

=== Luís Marques Mendes ===
==== Transnational political groups ====
- European People's Party

=== Catarina Martins ===
==== Foreign politicians ====
- Ilaria Salis – incumbent Member of the European Parliament (since 2024)
- Irene Montero – incumbent Member of the European Parliament (since 2024); former Minister of Equality of Spain (2020–2023)
- Hanna Gedin – incumbent Member of the European Parliament (since 2024)
- Jonas Sjöstedt – incumbent Member of the European Parliament (since 2024; also 1995–2006); former leader of the Swedish Left Party (2012–2020)
- Leïla Chaibi – incumbent Member of the European Parliament (since 2019)
- Li Andersson – incumbent Member of the European Parliament (since 2024); former leader of the Finnish Left Alliance (2016–2024); former Minister of Education (2019–2020; 2021–2023)
- Malin Björk – former Member of the European Parliament (2014–2024)
- Manon Aubry – incumbent Member of the European Parliament (since 2019); co-leader of The Left in the European Parliament (since 2019)
- Martin Schirdewan – incumbent Member of the European Parliament (since 2017); former leader of German Die Linke (2022–2024); co-leader of The Left in the European Parliament (since 2019)
