= 2023 Portuguese Socialist Party leadership election =

2023 Socialist Party leadership election
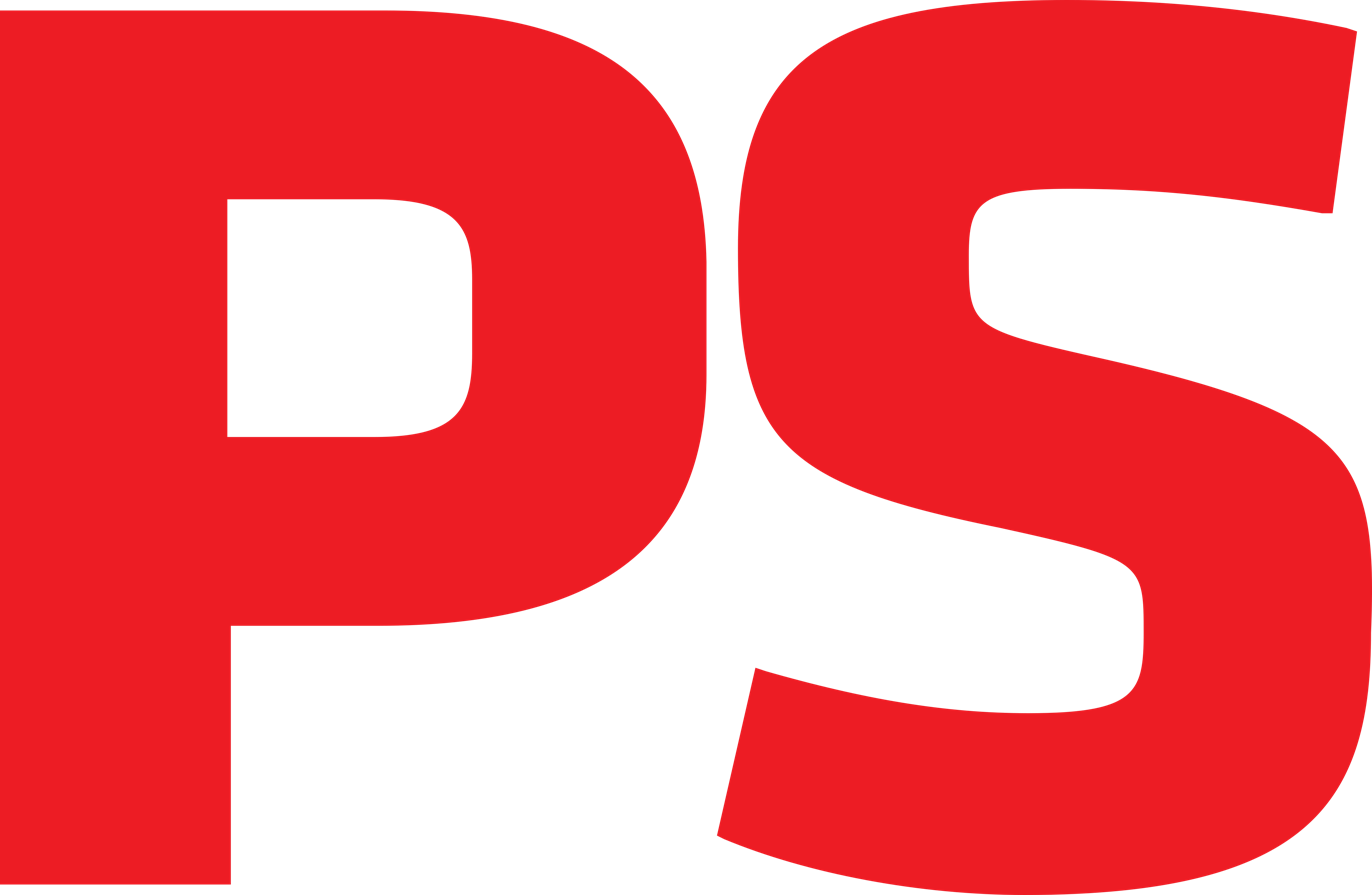
- 15–16 December 2023
- Turnout: 68.7% ▲29.7 pp
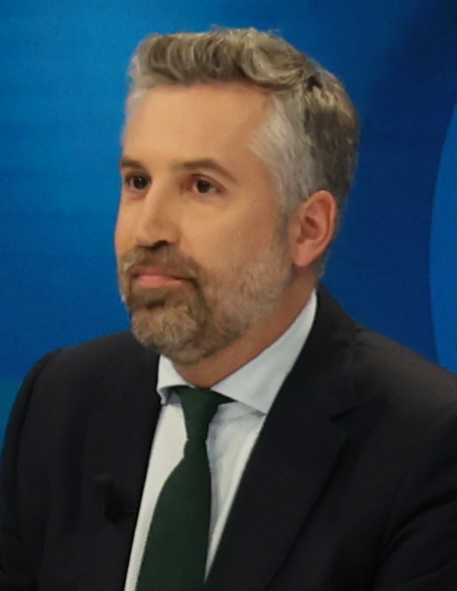

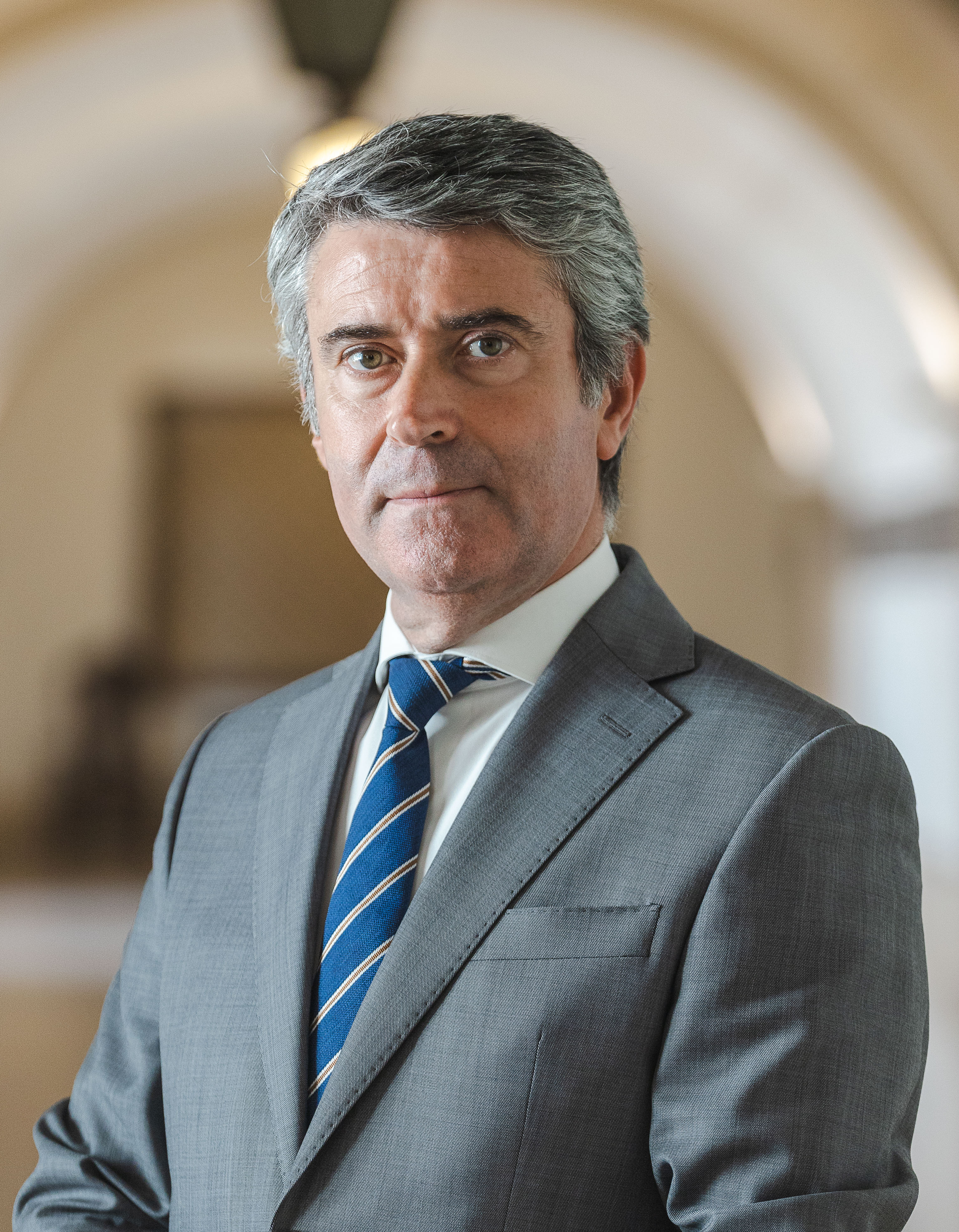
Candidate	Pedro Nuno Santos	José Luís Carneiro
Popular vote	24,219	14,891
Percentage	60.8%	37.4%
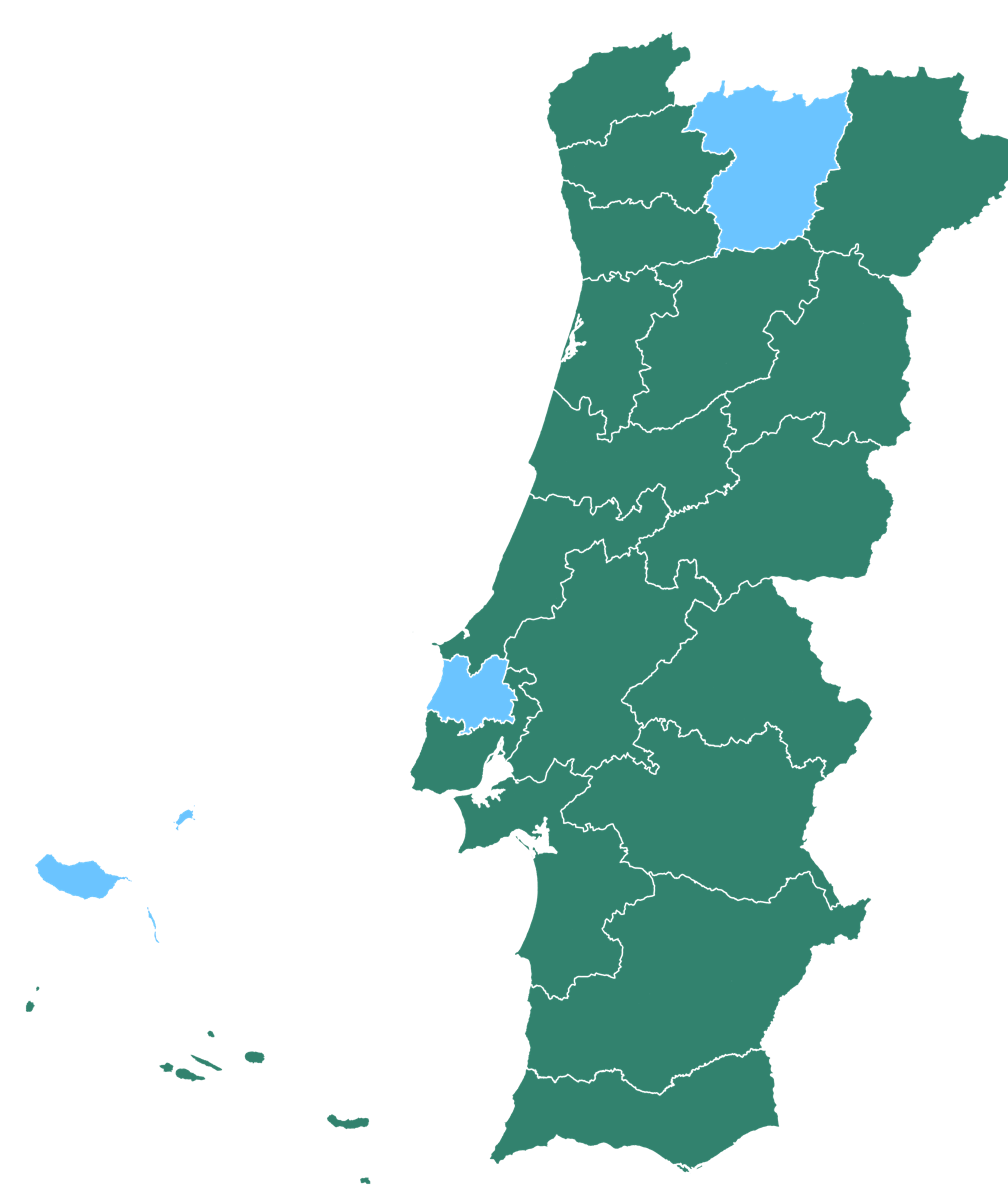
- Results by Party Federation. Santos Carneiro
Secretary-General before election
António Costa
Elected Secretary-General
Pedro Nuno Santos

The 2023 Portuguese Socialist Party leadership election was held on 15 and 16 December 2023. The leadership ballot was called after Prime Minister and Socialist Party Secretary-General António Costa resigned from office on 7 November 2023. The winner of this election led the Socialist Party into the 2024 legislative election.

The declared candidates included the former Infrastructure and Housing Minister Pedro Nuno Santos, who represented the leftist faction of the party and wants to build upon the legacy of António Costa, Internal Administration Minister José Luís Carneiro, who represented the moderate faction and a continuation of Costism, and Daniel Adrião, a longtime critic of Costa as Secretary-General, who represented a rupture.

Even with the candidates claiming the contrary, this leadership election was viewed as another ideological dispute to decide what direction the party and the country should take, similar to the leadership elections of 2014 between Costa and António José Seguro, of 2004 between José Sócrates and Manuel Alegre and of 1992 between António Guterres and Jorge Sampaio.

With a turnout rate of around 70%, Pedro Nuno Santos was elected as the new Secretary-General of the Socialist Party with almost 61% of the votes, against the 37% of José Luís Carneiro. Daniel Adrião polled below 1%.

== Background ==
The Socialist Party (PS), led by then Prime Minister António Costa, won an absolute majority in the 2022 legislative election with 41 percent of the votes and 120 seats in the 230 seat Assembly of the Republic.

António Costa's third government was sworn in on 30 March 2022. This government proved to be unstable and experienced several scandals. By mid-2023, the government had seen the resignations of 11 secretaries of state and two ministers. The biggest scandal involved TAP Air Portugal and a compensation payment to a government member, Alexandra Reis. This case was followed by a violent incident, in late April 2023, at the Ministry of Infrastructure, between government staff members and an advisor to Minister João Galamba regarding an alleged stolen laptop. The deployment of the Portuguese Secret Services in this case stirred a clash between Marcelo Rebelo de Sousa, the incumbent president of Portugal, and Prime Minister António Costa concerning the future of Galamba and the government itself.

=== Operation Influencer ===
On 7 November 2023, the Public Security Police and the Public Prosecutor's office carried out a series of searches at the official residence of the Prime Minister and other ministries, leading to the arrest of the Prime Minister's chief of staff. Costa was named as a suspect in a corruption case involving the awarding of contracts for the lithium and hydrogen businesses, but denied any wrongdoing. He met President Marcelo Rebelo de Sousa in the Presidential Palace and announced his resignation shortly after, stating that he would not run for re-election.

Following Costa's resignation the Socialist Party proposed a new cabinet led either by the President of the Assembly of the Republic, Augusto Santos Silva, the Governor of the Bank of Portugal, Mário Centeno, or by the former minister António Vitorino, that would last until the end of the government's term in 2026. President Marcelo Rebelo de Sousa however, after meeting with the Council of State, dissolved the assembly and called an early election for 10 March 2024.

The Prime Minister's resignation was not made official immediately; it was postponed until 8 December 2023, so that the State Budget for 2024 could be approved by parliament. It was the first time a single party majority government did not complete its full term in democratic Portugal.

== Candidates ==
=== Declared ===
Name	Born	Experience	Announcement date	Ref.
José Luís Carneiro	4 October 1971 (age 52); Baião	Minister of Internal Administration (2022–2024); Member of Parliament for Braga (since 2022); Deputy Secretary-general of the Socialist Party (2019–2022); Secretary of State for Portuguese Communities (2015–2019); Mayor of Baião (2005–2015); Member of Parliament for Porto (2005; 2015–2022)	10 November 2023	
Pedro Nuno Santos	13 April 1977 (age 46); São João da Madeira	Member of Parliament for Aveiro (since 2005); Minister of Infrastructure and Housing (2019–2023); Secretary of State for Parliament Affairs (2015–2019); Secretary-general of the Socialist Youth (2004–2008)	13 November 2023	
Daniel Adrião	1 September 1967 (age 56)	Member of the National Commission of the Socialist Party (2016–2025); Candidate in the PS leadership elections of 2016, 2018 and 2021	17 November 2023	

=== Declined ===
- Ana Catarina Mendes – Minister of Parliamentary Affairs (2022–2024)
- António José Seguro – former Secretary-general of the Socialist Party (2011–2014)
- Fernando Medina – Minister of Finance (2022–2024); former Mayor of Lisbon (2015–2021) (endorsed José Luís Carneiro)
- Francisco Assis – former MEP of the Socialist Party (PS) (2004–2009; 2014–2019); former mayor of Amarante (1990–1995) (endorsed Pedro Nuno Santos)
- Mariana Vieira da Silva – Minister of the Presidency (2019–2024)
- Marta Temido – former Minister of Health (2018–2022); chair of the Lisbon Socialist Party (2023–2024)
- Mário Centeno – governor of the Bank of Portugal (since 2020); former President of the Eurogroup (2018–2020); former Minister of Finance (2015–2020)

== Notable endorsements ==
José Luís Carneiro

Presidents of the Assembly of the Republic

- Augusto Santos Silva, President of the Assembly of the Republic (2022–2024), Minister of Foreign Affairs (2015–2022), Minister of National Defense (2009–2011), Minister of Parliamentary Affairs (2005–2009), Minister of Culture (2001–2002), Minister of Education (2000–2001)

Ministers

- Adalberto Campos Fernandes, Minister of Health (2015–2018)
- António Correia Campos, Minister of Health (2001–2002, 2005–2008), Member of the Assembly of the Republic for Viseu (1991–2001) and Member of the European Parliament (2009–2014)
- Catarina Sarmento e Castro, Minister of Justice (2022–2024) and Judge of the Constitutional Court (2010-2019)
- Constança Urbano de Sousa, Minister of Internal Administration (2015–2017) and Member of the Assembly of the Republic for Porto (2017-2022)
- Fernando Medina, Minister of Finance (2022–2024) and Mayor of Lisbon (2015–2021)
- Jorge Lacão, Minister of Parliamentary Affairs (2009–2011) and Member of the Assembly of the Republic for Santarém (1983–2009) and Lisbon (2011–2022)
- José António Vieira da Silva, Minister of Labour, Solidarity and Social Security (2015–2019)
- Maria de Belém Roseira, Member of the Assembly of the Republic for Lisbon (2000–2015), Minister for Equality (1999–2000), Minister of Health (1995-1999), President of the Socialist Party (2011–2014) and candidate in the 2016 Portuguese presidential election

Members of the Assembly of the Republic

- António Lacerda Sales, Member of the Assembly of the Republic for Leiria (2015–2024); Secretary of State for Health (2019–2022)
- Berta Nunes, Member of the Assembly of the Republic for Bragança (2023–2024) and Chair of the Bragança Federation of the Socialist Party
- Eurico Brilhante Dias, Member of the Assembly of the Republic for Leiria (since 2022), president of the Socialist Parliamentary Caucus (since 2022) and Secretary of State of Internationalization (2017-2022)
- Jamila Madeira, Member of the Assembly of the Republic for Faro (since 1999)
- João Azevedo, Member of the Assembly of the Republic for Viseu (2019–2025)
- Luís Capoulas Santos, Member of the Assembly of the Republic for Évora (2019–2024), Minister of Agriculture (1998–2002, 2015–2019) and Member of the European Parliament (2004–2014)
- Maria Antónia Almeida Santos, Member of the Assembly of the Republic for Setúbal (2005–2024)
- Maria da Luz Rosinha, Member of the Assembly of the Republic for Lisbon (2015–2024) and Mayor of Vila Franca de Xira (1998–2013)
- Paula Custódio Reis, Member of the Assembly of the Republic for Castelo Branco (2022–2024)
- Paulo Pisco, Member of the Assembly of the Republic for Europe (from 1999-2002 and 2009–2025)
- Pedro Cegonho, Member of the Assembly of the Republic for Lisbon (2019–2024)
- Romualda Fernandes, Member of the Assembly of the Republic for Lisbon (2019–2024)
- Susana Amador, Member of the Assembly of the Republic for Lisbon (2015–2024) and Mayor of Odivelas (2005–2015)

MEPs

- Carlos Zorrinho, Member of the European Parliament (2014–2024), Member of the Assembly of the Republic for Évora (1995–2014)

Mayors

- Antero Barbosa, Mayor of Fafe (since 2021)
- Basílio Horta, Mayor of Sintra (2013–2025), Vice Prime Minister (1981), Minister of Commerce (1978, 1980-1983), Candidate in the 1991 Portuguese presidential election and founding member of the CDS – People's Party
- Joaquim Barreto, Member of the Assembly of the Republic for Braga (2015–2022) and mayor of Cabeceiras de Basto (1993–2013)
- Leopoldo Rodrigues, Mayor of Castelo Branco (since 2021)
- Nuno Vaz Ribeiro, Mayor of Chaves (since 2017)
- Paulo Arsénio, Mayor of Beja (2017–2025)
- Paulo Cafôfo, Mayor of Funchal (2013–2019) and Secretary of State for Portuguese Communities (since 2022)
- Rui Solheiro, Secretary-general of the Portuguese National Association of Municipalities (since 2013), Mayor of Melgaço (1982–2012) and Member of the Assembly of the Republic for Viana do Castelo (1995–2002)

Individuals

- Tony Carreira, singer and musician
Pedro Nuno Santos

Ministers

- Alberto Martins, Minister of Justice (2009–2011) and Minister of State Reform (1999–2002)
- Ana Abrunhosa, Minister of Territorial Cohesion (2019–2024)
- Duarte Cordeiro, Minister of the Environment and Climate Action (2022–2024) and Chair of the Lisbon Urban Area Federation of the Socialist Party
- Eduardo Cabrita, Minister of Internal Administration (2017–2021) and Member of the Assembly of the Republic for Setúbal (2002–2015)
- João Marques Costa, Minister of Education (2022–2024)
- João Soares, Minister of Culture (2015–2016), Mayor of Lisbon (1995–2001) and candidate for the party's leadership in 2004
- Manuel Pizarro, Minister of Health (2022–2024), Member of the European Parliament (2019-2022) and Member of the Assembly of the Republic for Porto (2005–2011)
- Maria do Céu Antunes, Minister of Agriculture (2019–2024) and Mayor of Abrantes (2009–2019)
- Marina Gonçalves, Minister of Housing (2023–2024)

Members of the Assembly of the Republic

- Alexandra Leitão, Member of the Assembly of the Republic for Santarém (since 2022) and Minister for the Modernization of the State and Public Administration (2019–2022)
- Alexandre Quintanilha, Member of the Assembly of the Republic for Porto (2015–2024)
- Carlos João Pereira, Member of the Assembly of the Republic for Madeira (since 2015)
- Edite Estrela, Member of the Assembly of the Republic for Lisbon (since 1987), Vice President of the Assembly of the Republic (2015–2024), Member of the European Parliament (2004–2014) and Mayor of Sintra (1994–2002)
- Francisco César, Member of the Assembly of the Republic for Azores (since 2022)
- Hugo Costa, Member of the Assembly of the Republic for Santarém (since 2015) and Chair of the Santarém Federation of the Socialist Party
- Isabel Moreira, Member of the Assembly of the Republic for Lisbon (since 2011)
- João Paulo Rebelo, Member of the Assembly of the Republic for Viseu (2015–2024)
- João Torres, Member of the Assembly of the Republic for Porto (since 2015) and Deputy Secretary-General of the Socialist Party (since 2022)
- Luís Graça, Member of the Assembly of the Republic for Faro (since 2015) and Chair of the Algarve Federation of the Socialist Party
- Manuel Alegre, Member of the Council of State (2022–2024; 1996–2002), Member of the Assembly of the Republic for Lisbon (2002–2009) and for Coimbra (1975–2002), candidate for the party's leadership in 2004 and candidate in the 2006 and 2011 Portuguese presidential election
- Maria Begonha, Member of the Assembly of the Republic for Lisbon (since 2019)
- Miguel Costa Matos, Member of the Assembly of the Republic for Lisbon (since 2019) and Secretary General of the Socialist Youth (since 2020)
- Nelson Brito, Member of the Assembly of the Republic for Beja (since 2022) and Chair of the Lower Alentejo Federation of the Socialist Party
- Patrícia Faro, Member of the Assembly of the Republic for Porto (since 2022)
- Pedro Delgado Alves, Member of the Assembly of the Republic for Lisbon (since 2011)
- Porfírio Silva, Member of the Assembly of the Republic for Aveiro (2015–2024)
- Tiago Barbosa Ribeiro, Member of the Assembly of the Republic for Porto (since 2015)

MEPs

- Ana Gomes, Member of the European Parliament (2004–2019), Portuguese Ambassador to Indonesia (2000–2003) and candidate in the 2021 Portuguese presidential election
- Francisco Assis, Member of the European Parliament (2004–2009; 2014–2019), Member of the Assembly of the Republic for Porto (1995–2004; 2011–2014) and Mayor of Amarante (1989–1995)
- Sara Cerdas, Member of the European Parliament (2019–2024)

Mayors

- Domingos Bragança, Mayor of Guimarães (2013–2025)
- Eduardo Vítor Rodrigues, Mayor of Vila Nova de Gaia (2013–2025) and Chair of the Porto Federation of the Socialist Party
- Fredrico Castro, Mayor of Póvoa de Lanhoso (since 2021) and Chair of the Braga Federation of the Socialist Party
- Gonçalo Lopes, Mayor of Leiria (since 2019)
- Isilda Gomes, Mayor of Portimão (2013–2024) and Member of the Assembly of the Republic for Faro (2009–2011)
- Jorge Sequeira, Mayor of São João da Madeira (2017–2025) and Chair of the Aveiro Federation of the Socialist Party
- Luísa Salgueiro, Mayor of Matosinhos (since 2017), President of the Portuguese National Association of Municipalities (2021–2025) and Member of the Assembly of the Republic for Porto (2005–2017)
- Luís Machado, Mayor of Santa Marta de Penaguião (2013–2025) and Chair of the Vila Real Federation of the Socialist Party
- Vítor Manuel Pereira, Mayor of Covilhã (2013–2025) and Chair of the Castelo Branco Federation of the Socialist Party
- Vítor Paulo Pereira, Mayor of Paredes de Coura (2013–2025) and Chair of the Viana do Castelo Federation of the Socialist Party
- Walter Chicharro, Mayor of Nazaré (2013–2024) and Chair of the Leiria Federation of the Socialist Party
Declined to endorse

Prime Ministers

- António Costa, Prime Minister of Portugal (2015–2024), Secretary-General of the Socialist Party (2014–2024) and Mayor of Lisbon (2007–2015)

Ministers

- Mariana Vieira da Silva, Minister of the Presidency (2019–2024)

Members of the Assembly of the Republic

- Marta Temido, Member of the Assembly of the Republic for Coimbra (2022–2024), Minister of Health (2018-2022) and Chair of the Lisbon Socialist Party (2023–2024)

== Campaign period ==
=== Candidates' slogans ===
Candidate	Original slogan	English translation	Refs
José Luís Carneiro	« Por Todos. Para Todos »	"By All. For All"	
Pedro Nuno Santos	« Portugal Inteiro »	"Whole Portugal"	
Daniel Adrião	« Democracia Plena »	"Full Democracy"	

=== Candidates' debates ===
José Luís Carneiro and Daniel Adrião proposed a series of debates between the candidates, but Pedro Nuno Santos refused to participate in any debate. Therefore, no debates between the candidates to the leadership were held.

== Opinion polling ==
=== All voters ===
Polling firm	Fieldwork date	Sample size			Others/ Undecided	Lead
Polling firm	Fieldwork date	Sample size	Nuno Santos	Carneiro	Others/ Undecided	Lead
ICS/ISCTE	18–27 Nov 2023	803	26	24	50	2
CESOP–UCP	15–24 Nov 2023	1,102	29	38	33	9
Aximage	18–23 Nov 2023	802	52	26	22	26
Intercampus	14–17 Nov 2023	604	31.7	28.1	40.2	3.6
Aximage	10–13 Nov 2023	504	32	18	50 (Note: Mário Centeno: 21%; Other: 2%; Undecided: 27%)	14
Aximage	8–9 Nov 2023	516	30	9	61 (Note: Fernando Medina: 19%; Carlos César: 6%; Other: 3%; Undecided: 33%)	21

=== PS voters ===
Polling firm	Fieldwork date	Sample size			Others/ Undecided	Lead
Polling firm	Fieldwork date	Sample size	Nuno Santos	Carneiro	Others/ Undecided	Lead
ICS/ISCTE	18–27 Nov 2023	?	37	32	31	5
CESOP–UCP	15–24 Nov 2023	?	39	34	27	5
Aximage	18–23 Nov 2023	?	61	26	13	35
Aximage	10–13 Nov 2023	?	31	23	47 (Note: Mário Centeno: 29%; Other: 2%; Undecided: 16%)	8

Hypothetical polling

All voters

Polling firm	Fieldwork date	Sample size	Fernando Medina	Pedro Nuno Santos	Mariana Vieira da Silva	Ana Catarina Mendes	Marta Temido	Augusto Santos Silva	Pedro Adão e Silva	Others/ Undecided	Lead
ICS/ISCTE	10–18 Sep 2022	807	12	6	4	3	—N/a	8	1	65	4
Intercampus	14–23 Sep 2021	609	21.0	20.0	11.7	10.2	25.9	—N/a	—N/a	11.2	4.9

PS voters

Polling firm	Fieldwork date	Sample size	Fernando Medina	Pedro Nuno Santos	Mariana Vieira da Silva	Ana Catarina Mendes	Augusto Santos Silva	Others/ Undecided	Lead
ICS/ISCTE	10–18 Sep 2022	807	15	6	6	5	16	51	1

== Results ==
=== National summary ===
Candidate	15 & 16 December 2023	
Candidate	Votes	%
Pedro Nuno Santos	24,219	60.83
José Luís Carneiro	14,891	37.40
Daniel Adrião	382	0.96
Total	39,492	
Valid votes	39,492	99.19
Invalid and blank ballots	322	0.81
Votes cast / turnout	39,814	68.65
Registered voters	57,993	

Vote share
Pedro Nuno Santos	60.83%
José Luís Carneiro	37.40%
Daniel Adrião	0.96%
Blank/Invalid	0.81%

=== Results by party federation ===
The following table shows a breakdown of the results of the election by party federation, which are mostly equal to the electoral circles.

Result breakdown of the 2023 Portuguese Socialist Party leadership election
Federation	Pedro Nuno Santos		José Luís Carneiro		Daniel Adrião		Invalid ballots	Votes cast	Registered
Federation	Votes	%	Votes	%	Votes	%	Invalid ballots	Votes cast	Registered
Algarve	710	62.50	413	36.36	12	1.06	1	1,136	1,491
Aveiro	1,299	75.17	404	23.38	10	0.58	15	1,728	2,096
Baixo Alentejo	405	56.96	291	40.93	6	0.84	9	711	862
Braga	2,928	55.37	2,280	43.12	19	0.36	61	5,288	7,897
Bragança	560	58.82	373	39.18	9	0.95	10	952	1,131
Castelo Branco	549	58.10	373	39.47	5	0.53	18	945	1,123
Coimbra	1,874	68.80	800	29.37	35	1.28	15	2,724	3,506
Évora	270	63.08	145	33.88	8	1.87	5	428	534
Guarda	487	60.05	317	39.09	5	0.62	2	811	986
Leiria	611	58.58	410	39.31	13	1.25	9	1,043	1,249
Lisbon: Urban Area	3,265	66.85	1,519	31.10	61	1.25	39	4,884	7,165
Lisbon: Oeste	126	36.42	212	61.27	5	1.45	3	346	415
Portalegre	544	68.77	230	29.08	8	1.01	9	791	1,036
Porto	4,951	56.88	3,627	41.67	53	0.61	73	8,704	11,321
Santarém	752	70.28	293	27.38	16	1.50	9	1,070	1,252
Setúbal	1,382	66.38	656	31.51	27	1.30	17	2,082	2,942
Viana do Castelo	546	65.00	289	34.40	4	0.48	1	840	976
Vila Real	499	46.81	557	52.25	10	0.94	0	1,066	1,316
Viseu	1,386	67.68	635	31.01	3	0.15	24	2,048	2,478
Azores	321	65.91	165	33.88	0	0.00	1	487	4,677
Madeira	493	40.28	725	59.23	6	0.49	0	1,224	1896
Europe	117	54.67	77	35.98	19	8.88	1	214	892
Outside of Europe	144	49.32	100	34.25	48	16.44	0	292	752

== See also ==
- Elections in Portugal
- List of political parties in Portugal
