= João Torres =

Portuguese civil engineer and politician (born 1986)

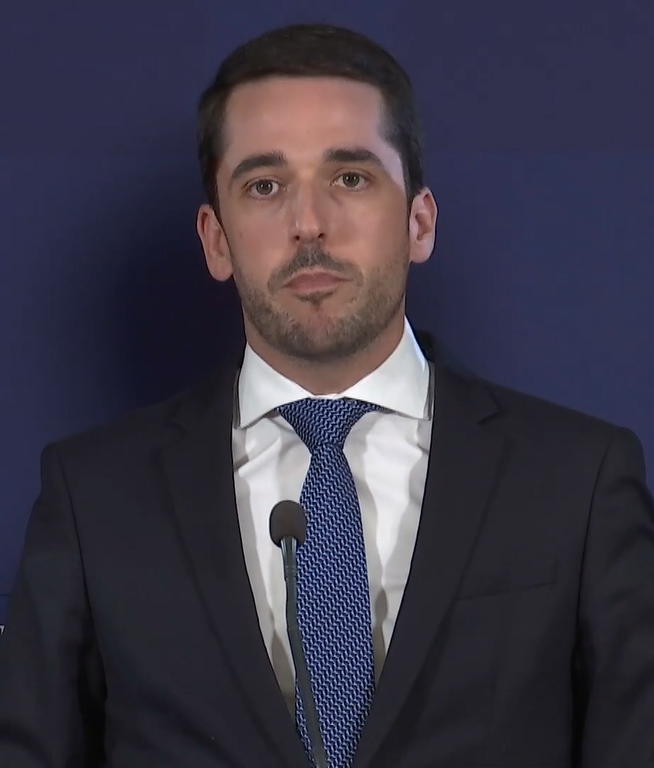
- Torres in 2022

Deputy Secretary-General of the Socialist Party
- In office 30 March 2022 – 13 January 2024
- Secretary-General: António Costa; Pedro Nuno Santos
- Preceded by: José Luís Carneiro
- Succeeded by: Vacant

Secretary of State for Commerce, Services and Consumer Protection
- In office 26 October 2019 – 30 March 2022
- Prime Minister: António Costa
- Preceded by: Himself (Consumer Protection)
- Succeeded by: Nuno Fazenda (Tourism, Commerce and Services)

Secretary of State for Consumer Protection
- In office 17 October 2018 – 26 October 2019
- Prime Minister: António Costa
- Preceded by: Paulo Alexandre Ferreira
- Succeeded by: Himself (Commerce, Services and Consumer Protection)

Secretary-General of the Socialist Youth
- In office 4 November 2012 – 18 December 2016
- Preceded by: Pedro Delgado Alves
- Succeeded by: Ivan Gonçalves

Member of the Assembly of the Republic
- Incumbent
- Assumed office 29 March 2022
- Constituency: Porto
- In office 23 October 2015 – 16 October 2018
- Constituency: Porto

Personal details
- Born: João Veloso da Silva Torres; 24 April 1986 (age 40) Maia, Portugal
- Party: Socialist
- Education: University of Porto (MEng)
- Profession: Civil engineer

João Veloso da Silva Torres (born 24 April 1986) was a leader of the Socialist Youth, is a former Member of Parliament, former Secretary of State for Consumer Protection in the XXI Portuguese Government, and currently holds the office of Secretary of State for Commerce, Services and Consumer Protection in the XXII Portuguese Government.

A certified engineer, with a Master of Engineering Studies in Civil Engineering by the University of Porto, has a professional record in the area before entering politics, as part of a project management team in a Portuguese construction company.

In late 2012, he run and won for the leadership of the Portuguese Socialist Youth. He was reelected in 2014 for a last term which lasted until 2016. He was elected Member of Parliament representing the electoral district of Porto in 2015, with competencies in the Parliamentary Commissions of Environment; Transparency; Culture, Communication, Youth and Sports; Territorial Planning; and Decentralisation, Local Power and Housing.

As of January 2017, he was nominated Vice-President of the Socialist Party Parliamentary Group. His term as Vice-President and Member of Parliament ended as he entered the XXI Portuguese Government.

In 17 October, João Veloso da Silva Torres, was nominated Secretary of State of Consumer Protection of the XXI Portuguese Government, whose term ended on 26 October 2019.

With the formation of the XXII Portuguese Government as of 26 October 2019, João Torres, was nominated Secretary of State for Commerce, Services and Consumer Protection.
