= Eurico Brilhante Dias =

Portuguese politician

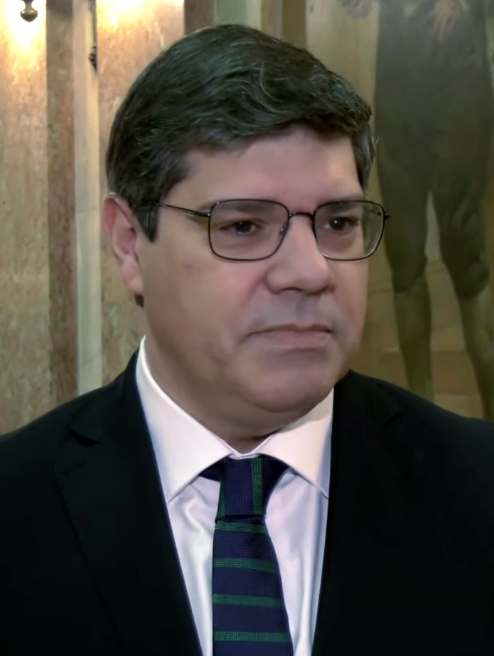
- Eurico Brilhante Dias in 2023.

President of the Socialist Party's Parliamentary group
- Incumbent
- Assumed office 3 July 2025
- Preceded by: Pedro Delgado Alves
- In office 29 March 2022 – 5 April 2024
- Preceded by: Ana Catarina Mendes
- Succeeded by: Alexandra Leitão

Secretary of State of Internationalization
- In office 14 July 2017 – 28 March 2022
- Prime Minister: António Costa
- Preceded by: Jorge Oliveira
- Succeeded by: Bernardo Ivo Cruz

Member of the Assembly of the Republic
- Incumbent
- Assumed office 29 March 2022
- Constituency: Leiria
- In office 23 October 2015 – 29 March 2022
- Constituency: Castelo Branco

Personal details
- Born: 15 March 1972 (age 54) Lisbon, Portugal
- Party: Socialist Party

Eurico Jorge Nogueira Leite Brilhante Dias (born 15 March 1972) is a Portuguese politician who currently serves as the leader of the Socialist Party's parliamentary group in the Assembly of the Republic since 2025, having previously served from 2022 to 2024.

== Political career ==
Brilhante Dias was a supporter of António José Seguro during the 2014 prime ministerial primaries. After António Costa defeated Seguro, Brilhante Dias was firstly elected to the Assembly of the Republic in Castelo Branco. He supported Maria de Belém Roseira's candidacy in the 2016 presidential election, criticizing the Socialist Party for not supporting a candidate in that election.

In 2017, following Jorge Oliveira's resignation as Secretary of State for Internationalization, Brilhante Dias was appointed by António Costa for that position.

After the 2022 election, Brilhante Dias was chosen for the position of leader of the Socialist parliamentary group, succeeding Ana Catarina Mendes who became the Minister of Parliamentary Affairs.

Brilhante Dias supported José Luís Carneiro during the 2023 leadership election, that was ultimately won by Pedro Nuno Santos. He was later chosen as the main candidate of the Socialist Party for Leiria in the 2024 election.

He returned to the post of parliamentary leader in July 2025 after the election of José Luís Carneiro as the leader of the Socialist Party.
