= Bruno Gonçalves (politician) =

Portuguese politician

Bruno Gonçalves MEP
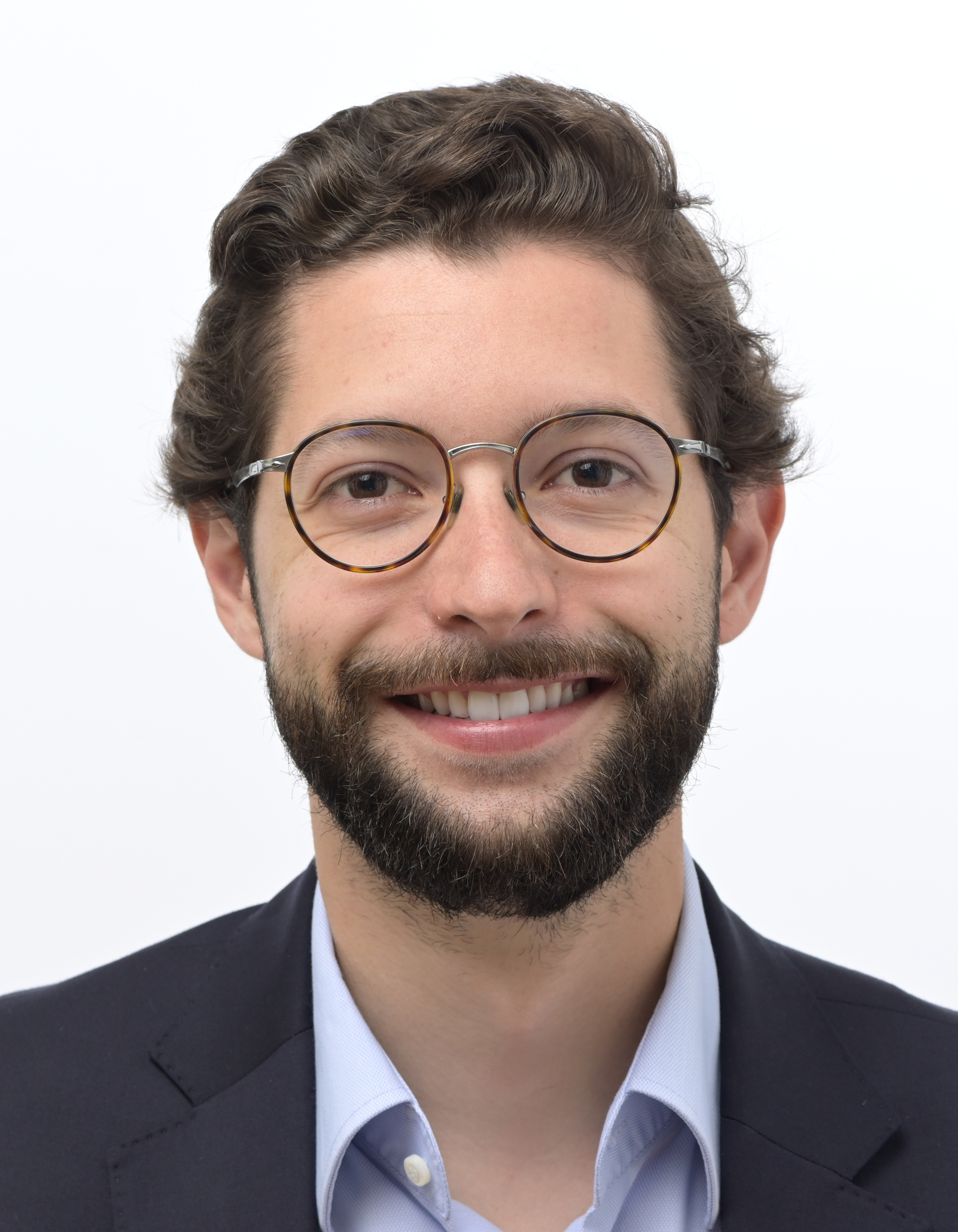
- Official portrait, 2024

Member of the European Parliament for Portugal
- Incumbent
- Assumed office 16 July 2024

Vice President of the Socialist International
- Incumbent
- Assumed office 25 November 2022
- President: Pedro Sánchez

Secretary-General of the International Union of Socialist Youth
- Incumbent
- Assumed office 21 June 2021
- Preceded by: Alessandro Pirisi

Member of the Braga Municipal Assembly
- In office 26 October 2017 – 4 November 2025

Personal details
- Born: Bruno Alexandre Rocha Gonçalves; 27 December 1996 (age 29) Braga, Portugal
- Party: Socialist Party
- Other political affiliations: Socialist Youth
- Education: University of Minho
- Occupation: Mechanical engineer • politician

Bruno Alexandre Rocha Gonçalves (born 27 December 1996) is a Portuguese politician of the Socialist Party (PS). He was elected member of the European Parliament in 2024. He has been serving as secretary-general of the International Union of Socialist Youth since 2021, and as vice president of the Socialist International since 2022.

== Early life and career ==
Gonçalves was born in Braga and graduated from the University of Minho with a master's degree in mechanical engineering. As of 2024, he had been a member of Socialist Youth for "about 10 years." He was previously leader of the Braga branch of Socialist Youth, and is a member of the Municipal Assembly.

In 2024, he ran for the leadership of the Socialist Youth, but lost against Sofia Pereira, gaining only 40.6% of the votes to his opponent's 58.2%.

== Electoral history ==
=== 2024 Socialist Youth leadership election ===
Ballot: 15 December 2024
| Candidate | Votes | % |
|---|---|---|
| Sofia Pereira | 198 | 58.2 |
| Bruno Gonçalves | 138 | 40.6 |
| Blank/Invalid ballots | 4 | 1.2 |
| Turnout | 340 | —N/a |
Source: Observador
