= Ministry of Housing (Portugal) =

Government ministry of Portugal

The Ministry of Housing (Portuguese: Ministério da Habitação) is a Portuguese government ministry.

== Ministers ==
- Marina Gonçalves
