= António Mendonça Mendes =

Portuguese politician (born 1976)

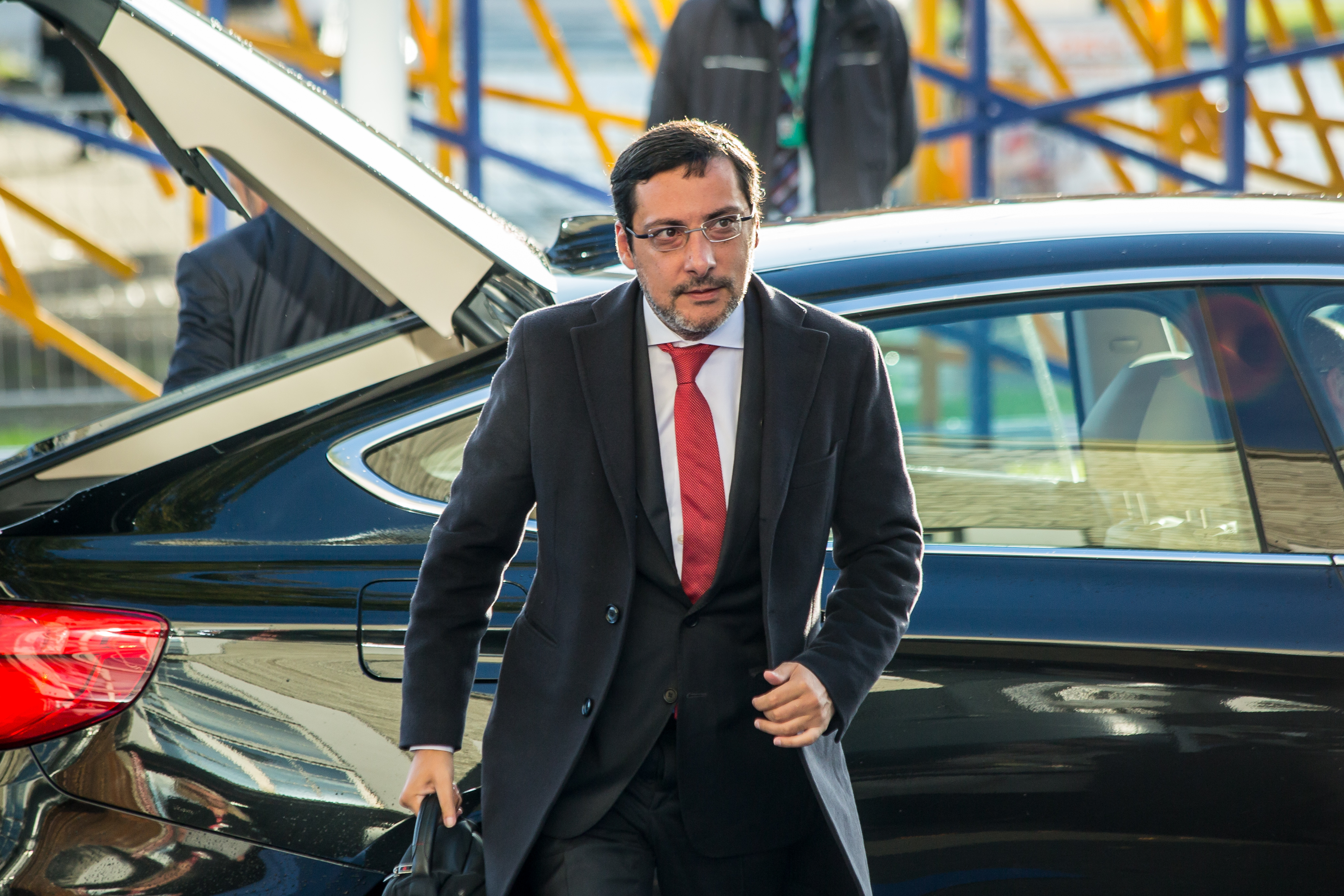
- Mendes in 2017

Member of the Assembly of the Republic
- Incumbent
- Assumed office 26 March 2024
- Constituency: Setúbal

Personal details
- Born: 19 December 1976 (age 49)
- Party: Socialist Party
- Relatives: Ana Catarina Mendes (sister)

António Manuel Veiga dos Santos Mendonça Mendes (born 19 December 1976) is a Portuguese politician serving as a member of the Assembly of the Republic since 2024. He is the brother of Ana Catarina Mendes.
