= Alexandra Leitão =

Portuguese politician

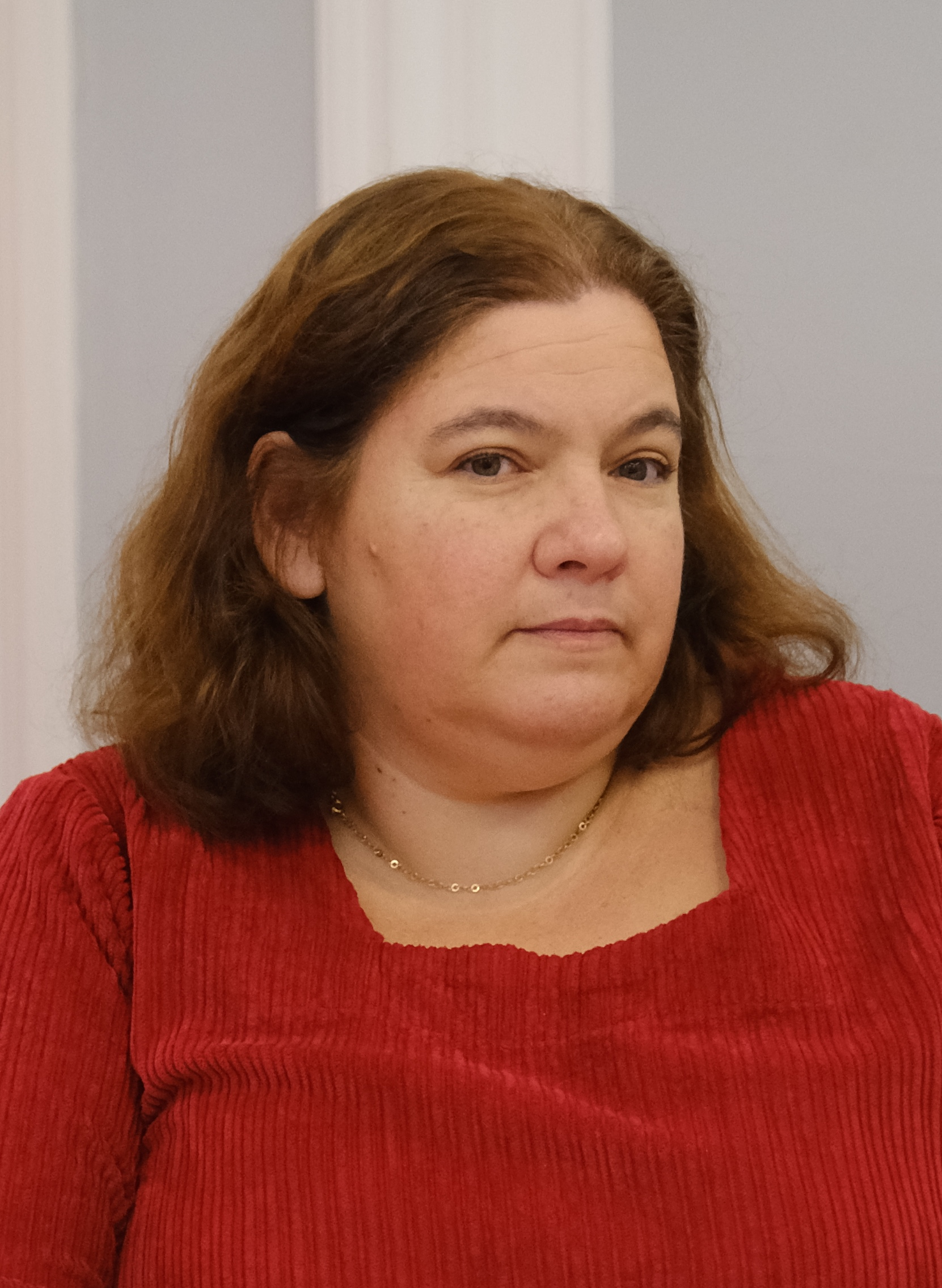
- Alexandra Leitão in 2023

President of the Socialist Party's Parliamentary group
- In office 5 April 2024 – 2 June 2025
- Secretary-General: Pedro Nuno Santos
- Preceded by: Eurico Brilhante Dias
- Succeeded by: Pedro Delgado Alves

Member of the Assembly of the Republic
- In office 29 March 2022 – 2 June 2025
- Constituency: Santarém

Minister for the Modernization of the State and Public Administration
- In office 26 October 2019 – 30 March 2022
- Prime Minister: António Costa
- Preceded by: Mariana Vieira da Silva
- Succeeded by: Mário Campolargo

Secretary of State for Education
- In office 26 November 2015 – 26 October 2019
- Prime Minister: António Costa
- Minister: Tiago Brandão Rodrigues

Personal details
- Born: April 8, 1973 (age 53) Alvalade, Lisbon, Portugal
- Party: Socialist Party (since 1995)
- Other political affiliations: Socialist Youth (1991–2003)
- Spouse: João Miranda (m. 1998)
- Children: 2
- Relatives: Jorge Miranda (father-in-law)
- Education: University of Lisbon
- Occupation: Jurist; professor; politician

Alexandra Ludomila Ribeiro Fernandes Leitão (Note: Portuguese pronunciation: [ɐlɛˈʃɐ̃dɾɐ luduˈmilɐ ʁiˈbɐjɾu fɨɾˈnɐ̃dɨʒ lɐjtɐ̃w̃].) (born 8 April 1973) is a Portuguese politician, jurist and professor of law.

== Biography ==
Leitão was born on April 8, 1973. She was Secretary of State for Education in the XXI Constitutional Government and Minister for the Modernization of the State and Public Administration in the XXII Constitutional Government.

She graduated in law from the Faculty of Law of the University of Lisbon in 1995, having completed a Master's in Legal and Political Sciences from the same Faculty in 2001, and a Doctorate in 2011. She worked as an Assistant at the Faculty of Law of the University from Lisbon between 1996 and 2011, and as Assistant Professor since 2011.

She joined the Socialist Party in 1995, having been active in the Socialist Youth since 1991.

Between 1997 and 1999 she was assistant to the Cabinet of the Secretary of State for the Presidency of the Council of Ministers of the XIII Constitutional Government of Portugal. She worked as a consultant for the Legal Center of the Presidency of the Council of Ministers (CEJUR) between 1999 and 2009, which she took over in 2011, becoming Deputy Director of CEJUR between 2009 and 2011. She was also a member of the Advisory Board of the Attorney General of the Republic between 2011 and 2015.

In January 2025, it was announced that Leitão would be the PS candidate for the Lisbon mayorship in the 2025 local elections.

== Electoral history ==
=== Lisbon City Council election, 2025 ===
Ballot: 12 October 2025
Party	Candidate	Votes	%	Seats	+/−
PSD/CDS–PP/IL	Carlos Moedas	110,586	41.7	8	+1
PS/Livre/BE/PAN	Alexandra Leitão	90,068	34.0	6	–2
Chega	Bruno Mascarenhas	26,780	10.1	2	+2
CDU	João Ferreira	26,769	10.1	1	–1
Other parties		4,291	1.6	0	±0
Blank/Invalid ballots		6,774	2.6	–	–
Turnout		265,268	57.22	17	±0
Source: Autárquicas 2025
