= SEDES =

Portuguese think tank

The SEDES is one of the oldest Portuguese civic associations and think tanks.

== History ==
SEDES was incorporated in 1970, its founders coming from different academic, social, professional and political affiliations. They joined to seek societal change by establishing a diverse social activism, organizing political opposition against the Estado Novo regime that ruled Portugal since the 1920s, and encouraging participation in academic associations, Christian organizations and trade union activities. The common denominators inspiring the founders of SEDES were humanism, socio-cultural development and democracy.

SEDES held meetings, organized working groups, and facilitated debates in various locations of Portugal; it was the first Portuguese organization to proclaim the advantages of a rapprochement with the European Community and was a pluralistic school of civics.

With the advent of democracy on 25 April 1974, many of its associates have contributed to the social and political life of the country in various political parties. Possibly there has not been a single Portuguese government since then which did not contain among its members figures associated with SEDES.
