= Sofia Pereira (politician) =

Portuguese politician (born July 1999)

Member of the Assembly of the Republic
- Incumbent
- Assumed office 3 June 2025
- Constituency: Porto

Secretary-general of the Socialist Youth
- Incumbent
- Assumed office 15 December 2024
- Preceded by: Miguel Costa Matos

Member of the Lamego Municipal Assembly
- Incumbent
- Assumed office 1 October 2017

Personal details
- Born: Sofia Alexandra Correia Pereira; 25 July 1999 (age 26) Lamego, Portugal
- Party: Socialist Party (since 2014)

Sofia Alexandra Correia Pereira (born 25 May 1999) is a Portuguese politician who has been serving as the Secretary-general of the Socialist Youth (JS) since December 2024. She was elected as a member of the Assembly of the Republic from Porto in the 2025 legislative election.

== Biography ==
Born in Ferreirim, Lamego, in 1999, Sofia Pereira has been a member of the Socialist Youth since she was 15. She was the President of the Viseu Federation of the JS, having also been elected as a member of the Lamego Municipal Assembly in 2017.

In December 2024, she ran for the Socialist Party's youth organization in the 25th Congress of the Socialist Youth, defeating MEP Bruno Gonçalves, with 58% of the votes, and succeeding Miguel Costa Matos as the 15th secretary-general of JS.

She was announced as the second candidate in the PS list for Porto in the 2025 legislative election, being elected as a member of the Assembly of the Republic.

== Electoral history ==
=== 2024 Socialist Youth leadership election ===
Ballot: 15 December 2024
| Candidate | Votes | % |
|---|---|---|
| Sofia Pereira | 198 | 58.2 |
| Bruno Gonçalves | 138 | 40.6 |
| Blank/Invalid ballots | 4 | 1.2 |
| Turnout | 340 | —N/a |
Source: Observador
