= Miguel Costa Matos =

Portuguese politician (born 1994)

Miguel Matos
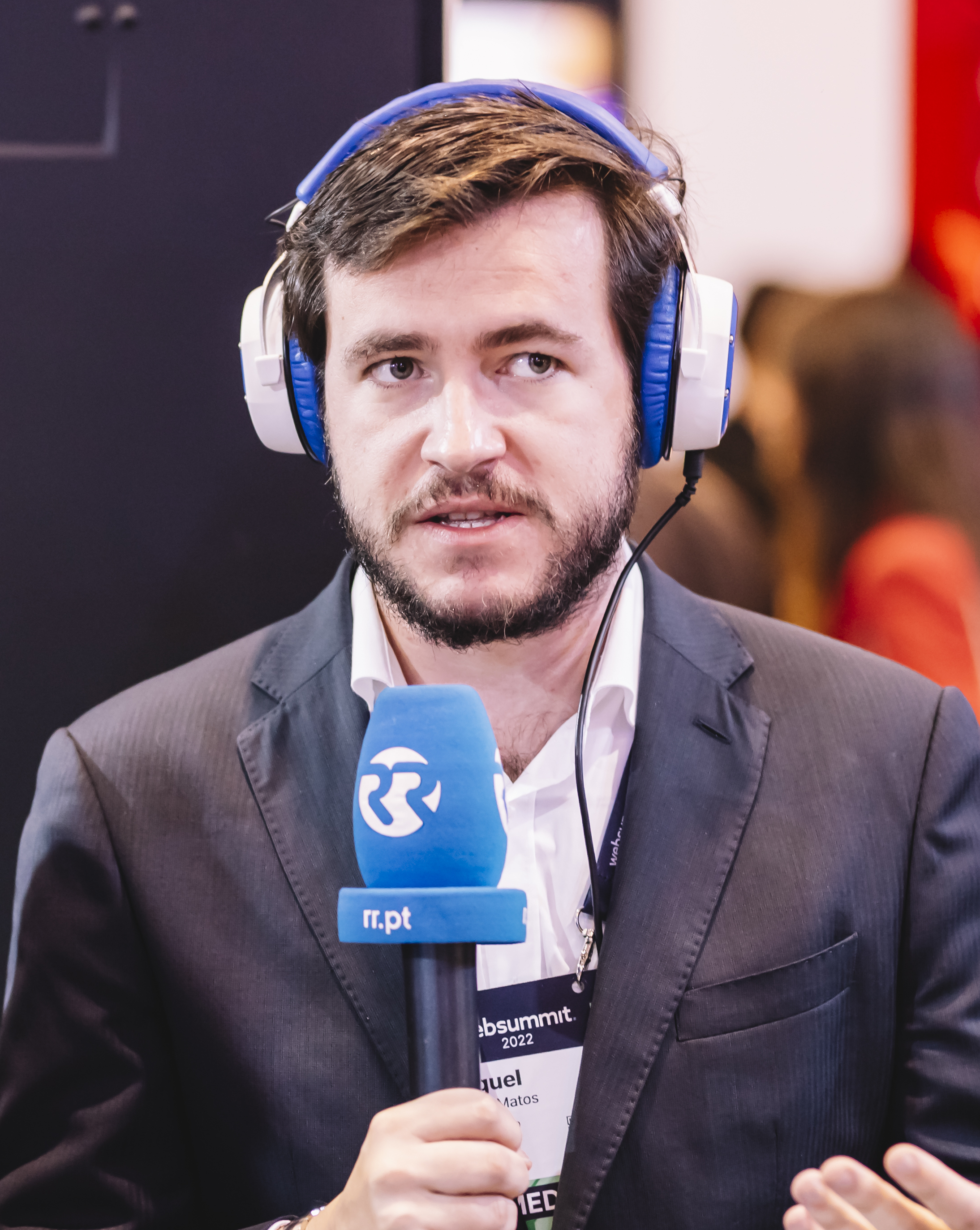
- Costa Matos in 2022

Member of the Assembly of the Republic
- Incumbent
- Assumed office 25 October 2019
- Constituency: Lisbon (2019–2024); Setúbal (2024–present)

Secretary General of the Socialist Youth
- In office 13 December 2020 – 15 December 2024
- Preceded by: Maria Begonha
- Succeeded by: Sofia Pereira

Personal details
- Born: Miguel de Oliveira Pires da Costa Matos; 29 May 1994 (age 31) Lisbon, Portugal
- Party: Socialist Party
- Education: NOVA University Lisbon; University of Warwick

Miguel de Oliveira Pires da Costa Matos (born 29 May 1994) is a Portuguese politician. He served as Secretary General of Socialist Youth. He became a member of the Portuguese Parliament for the Socialist Party in 2019. At 26, he was the youngest person to become a member of Parliament.

== Early life ==
He earned a degree in philosophy, politics and economics from the University of Warwick and a Master's degree in economics from NOVA University Lisbon.

At Warwick, he was elected twice as Undergraduate Student Representative for the Faculty of Social Sciences.

== Career ==
He collaborated in the drafting of the Socialist Party Electoral Program for the 2019 legislative election. He worked as an economic assistant in the Prime Minister's Office from September 2017 to October 2019.

He became President of the Lisbon Urban Area Federation of Socialist Youth in 2017 and is a member of the Parish Assembly of the Union of Parishes of Carcavelos and Parede and the Municipal Assembly of Cascais.

He was elected to the Portuguese Parliament in 2019 as a member of the Socialist Party in the Lisbon constituency. He is a member of the Budget and Finance Committee and the Environment Committee.
