= Ana Catarina Mendes =

Portuguese politician (born 1973)

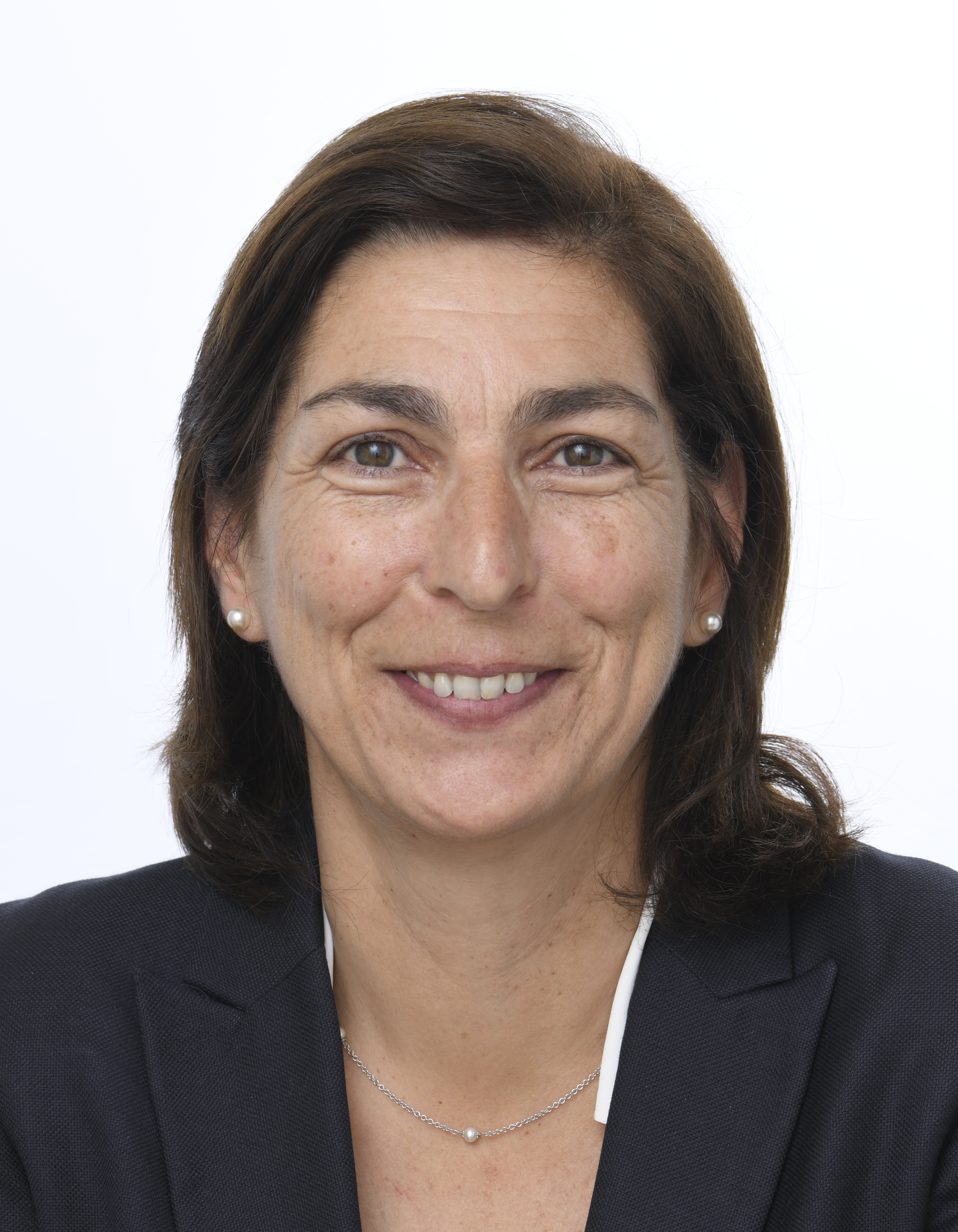
- Official portrait, 2024

Member of the European Parliament for Portugal
- Incumbent
- Assumed office 16 July 2024

Minister Adjunct and for Parliamentary Affairs
- In office 30 March 2022 – 2 April 2024
- Prime Minister: António Costa
- Preceded by: Tiago Antunes (Secretary of State Assistant to the Prime Minister); Duarte Cordeiro (Secretary of State for Parliamentary Affairs)
- Succeeded by: Manuel Castro Almeida (Minister Adjunct); Pedro Duarte (Parliamentary Affairs)

Deputy Secretary-General of the Socialist Party
- In office 9 December 2015 – 17 October 2019
- Secretary-General: António Costa
- Preceded by: Office established
- Succeeded by: José Luís Carneiro

Member of the Assembly of the Republic
- In office 27 October 1995 – 15 July 2024
- Constituency: Setúbal

Personal details
- Born: Ana Catarina Veiga Santos Mendonça Mendes; 14 January 1973 (age 53) Coimbra, Portugal
- Party: Socialist Party
- Spouse: Paulo Pedroso (m. 2006; div. 2020)
- Children: 2
- Relatives: António Mendonça Mendes (brother)
- Education: University of Lisbon; University Institute of Lisbon

Ana Catarina Veiga dos Santos Mendonça Mendes (born 14 January 1973) is a Portuguese politician of the Socialist Party (PS) who has been a member of the Assembly of the Republic since 1995 and, from 2019, led the party in Parliament. In March 2022, she was appointed Minister of Parliamentary Affairs in the XXIII Constitutional Government, a position she held until after the March 2024 national election.

Ana Catarina Mendes was elected a Member of the European Parliament in the 2024 European election, and sworn-in in the Tenth European Parliament.

== Early life ==
Ana Catarina Veiga Santos Mendonça Mendes was born in Coimbra on 14 January 1973. She obtained an undergraduate law degree from the University of Lisbon and a master's degree in New Frontiers of Law from the ISCTE – University Institute of Lisbon. Mendes led the Almada and the Setúbal District Federation of Socialist Youth (Juventude Socialista), the youth wing of the Portuguese Socialist Party (PS).

She was President of the Setúbal District Federation of the Socialist Party from 2014 to 2015, when she was appointed Deputy Secretary-General.

She married Paulo Pedroso but they are now divorced.

== Political career ==
Mendes served as a councillor in the Almada municipality from 1993 to 1997 and was elected to the national Assembly of the Republic in 1995 as a representative of the PS for Setúbal, a position she occupied until july, 15h of 2024.

She was President of the Setúbal District Federation of the Socialist Party from 2014 to 2015, when she was appointed Deputy Secretary-General.

From 2015 to 2019 she served as Deputy Secretary-General of the PS. From 2019, she was the Socialist Party's first female Parliamentary Leader, in which role she stressed her intention to promote further diversity within the Parliamentary party. Following the 2022 Portuguese legislative election, Mendes was appointed as Minister of Parliamentary Affairs. On June 26, 2024, she was elected Vice President of the Progressive Alliance of Socialists and Democrats.

== Broadcasting ==
Since early 2018 Mendes has been a regular political commentator on Portuguese television, beginning with Televisão Independente (TVI) and the radio station TSF, then moving to a weekly programme on the SIC Notícias television channel, before moving back to TVI. She was replaced by Alexandra Leitão in March 2022, after taking office as Deputy Minister and Minister for Parliamentary Affairs.

== Personal life ==
At the time of her appointment to the government in 2022, Mendes’ brother António Mendonça Mendes served as Secretary of State for Fiscal Affairs and her sister-in-law Patrícia Melo e Castro was a member of Prime Minister Costa's staff.

== Member of the European Parliament ==
On 16 July 2024, she was sworn in as a member of European Parliament, and is a member of Committee on Civil Liberties, Justice and Home Affairs (LIBE) and Subcommittee on Security and Defence (SEDE), as a substitute in Committee on Foreign Affairs (AFET).
