= Ivan Costa Gonçalves =

Portuguese politician (born 1987)

Ivan Gonçalves
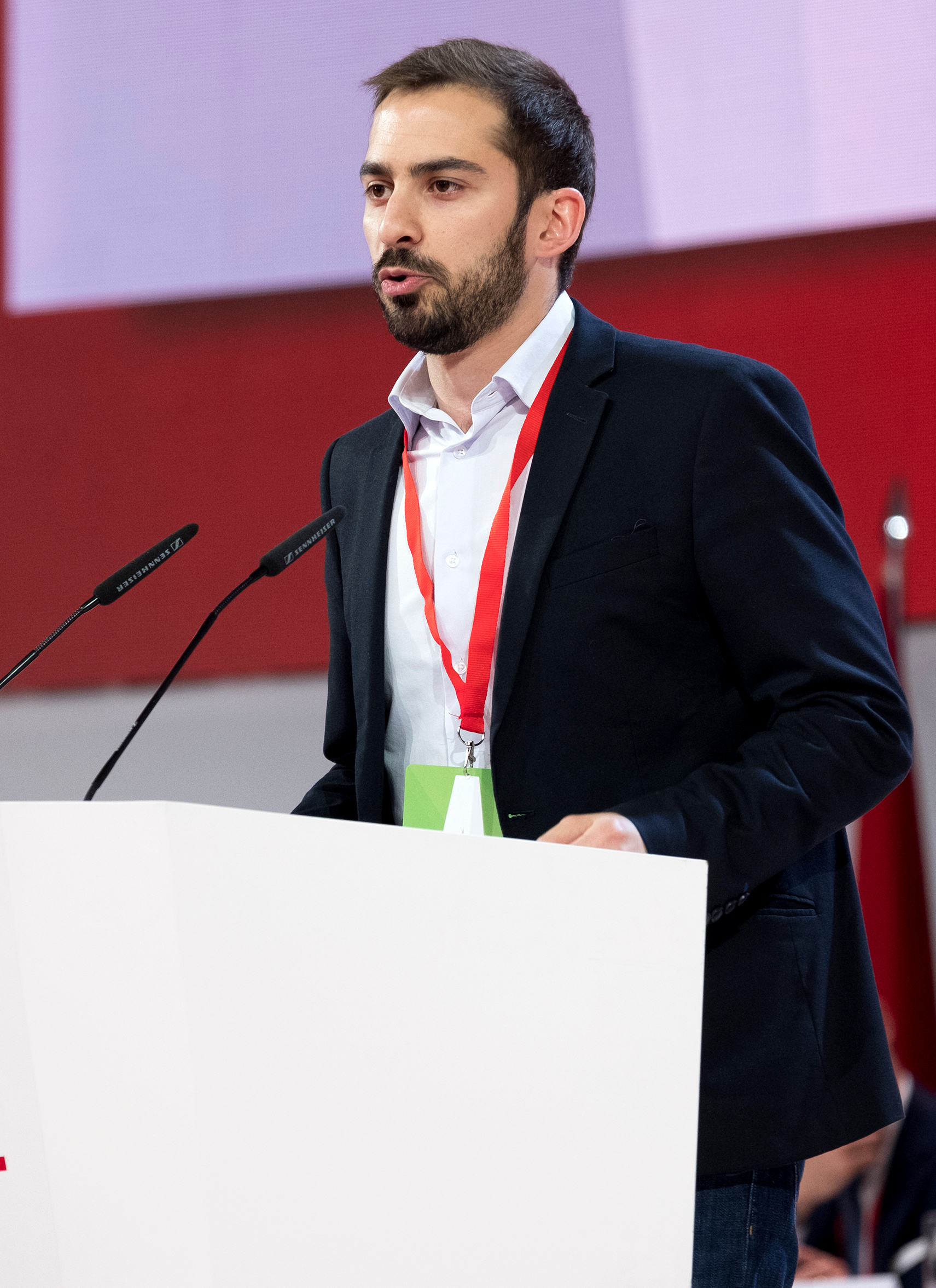

Member of Parliament for Setúbal
- Incumbent
- Assumed office 27 November 2015

Personal details
- Born: 3 June 1987 (age 39) Lisbon, Portugal
- Party: Socialist Party
- Education: Technical University of Lisbon, University of Lisbon
- Occupation: Politician

Ivan da Costa Gonçalves (born 3 June 1987) is a Portuguese politician, member of the Socialist Party and member of the Portuguese Parliament in the 13th and 14th legislatures. He has a degree in Biological engineering and served as secretary-general of the Socialist Youth between December 2016 and December 2018.

== Biography ==
He has a degree in biological engineering from Instituto Superior Técnico (University of Lisbon), where he was awarded a Research Integration Scholarship from the Foundation for Science and Technology. Also at the Instituto Superior Técnico, he was President of the Students' Association, a member of the Statutory Assembly and the IST School Council, a member of the General Council of the Technical University of Lisbon and a member of the Statutory Assembly of the University of Lisbon, which resulted from the merger of the former University of Lisbon and Technical University of Lisbon.

He was a member of the General Council of FAIRe (Academic Federation for Information and External Representation), the organization representing Portuguese higher education in ESU (European Students' Union), and was its representative in various international forums.

As a Socialist Youth activist he was coordinator of the IST Socialist Student Group, President of the Almada Council, President of the Setúbal District Federation, National Academic Coordinator, member of the National Secretariat with responsibility for Higher Education and Labor, Socialist Youth representative on the National Commission and the National Political Commission of the Socialist Party and Secretary General for the 2016–2018 term.

During the 13th Legislature he was vice-chair of the PS Parliamentary Bench, Coordinator of the Socialist Party Parliamentary Group on Youth and its representative on the Digital Parliament Working Group. He is a member of the Parliamentary Committees on Culture, Communication, Youth and Sport, Budget, Finance and Administrative Modernization, Labour and Social Security, Vice-chairman of the Portugal/Palestine Parliamentary Friendship Group, member of the Portugal/Japan and Portugal/Paraguay Groups, alternate member of the Parliamentary Assembly of the Council of Europe and alternate member of the Parliamentary Assembly of the Council of Europe.

Since the 2017 municipal elections he has been the leader of the Socialist Party's caucus in the Almada Municipal Assembly. In previous terms, he has also served as a substitute councillor on the Almada City Council and as an alternate member of the Almada Parish Council.

Since January 2020 he has been president of the Almada council of the Socialist Party.

In September 2020 he returned to parliament for the 14th legislature.
