= Pedro Delgado Alves =

Portuguese politician (born 1980)

President of the Socialist Party's Parliamentary group
- In office 3 June 2025 – 3 July 2025
- Secretary-General: Carlos César (acting); José Luís Carneiro
- Preceded by: Alexandra Leitão
- Succeeded by: Eurico Brilhante Dias

Member of the Assembly of the Republic
- Incumbent
- Assumed office 20 June 2011
- Constituency: Lisbon (2011–2025); Coimbra (2025–present)

Secretary-General of the Socialist Youth
- In office 18 July 2010 – 4 November 2012
- Preceded by: Duarte Cordeiro
- Succeeded by: João Torres

President of the Lumiar Freguesia
- In office 29 September 2013 – 26 September 2021
- Preceded by: José Sá Fernandes
- Succeeded by: Ricardo Mexia

Personal details
- Born: Pedro Filipe Mota Delgado Simões Alves; 12 December 1980 (age 45) Lisbon, Portugal
- Party: Socialist Party
- Education: Deutsche Schule Lissabon
- Alma mater: University of Lisbon
- Occupation: Jurist • Professor • Politician

Pedro Filipe Mota Delgado Simões Alves (born 12 December 1980) is a Portuguese politician of the Socialist Party. Since 2011, he has been a member of the Assembly of the Republic. From 2010 to 2012, he served as secretary-general of the Socialist Youth.
