= Marina Gonçalves =

Portuguese politician (born 1988)

Minister of Housing
- In office 4 January 2023 – 2 April 2024
- Prime Minister: António Costa
- Preceded by: Pedro Nuno Santos
- Succeeded by: Miguel Pinto Luz

Secretary of State for Housing
- In office 17 September 2020 – 4 January 2023
- Prime Minister: António Costa
- Preceded by: Ana Pinho
- Succeeded by: Fernanda Rodrigues

Member of the Assembly of the Republic
- Incumbent
- Assumed office 26 March 2024
- Constituency: Viana do Castelo
- In office 25 October 2019 – 17 September 2020
- Constituency: Viana do Castelo

Personal details
- Born: 23 April 1988 (age 38) Caminha, Portugal
- Party: Socialist Party
- Education: University of Porto (LLM)

Marina Sola Gonçalves (born 23 April 1988) is a Portuguese politician who briefly served as Minister of Housing in XXIII Constitutional Government of Portugal from 2023 to 2024 and served as member of Assembly of the Republic from Viana do Castelo. At the time of her appointment to government, she was the youngest minister in history of Politics of Portugal.

== Personal life ==
She was born on 23 April 1988 in Caminha.
