= Duarte Cordeiro =

Portuguese economist and politician (born 1979)

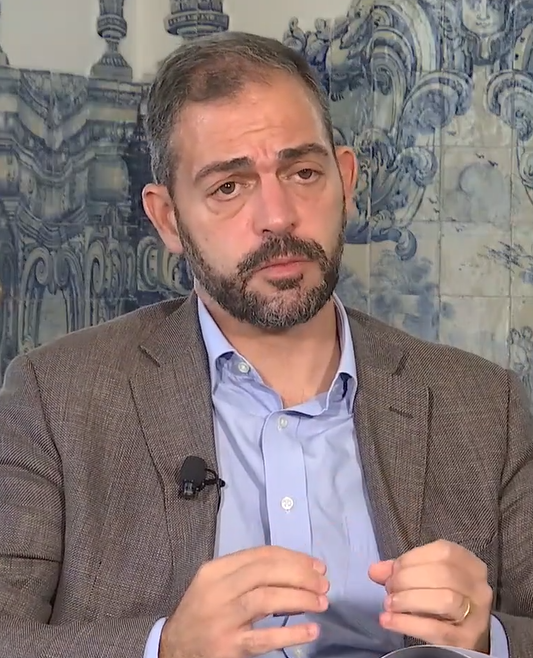
- Cordeiro in 2022

Minister of the Environment and Climate Action
- In office 30 March 2022 – 2 April 2024
- Prime Minister: António Costa
- Preceded by: João Pedro Matos Fernandes
- Succeeded by: Maria da Graça Carvalho

Secretary of State for Parliamentary Affairs
- In office 18 October 2019 – 30 March 2022
- Prime Minister: António Costa
- Preceded by: Pedro Nuno Santos
- Succeeded by: Ana Catarina Mendes

Deputy Mayor of Lisbon
- In office 8 April 2015 – 18 February 2019
- Mayor: Fernando Medina
- Preceded by: Fernando Medina
- Succeeded by: João Paulo Saraiva

Secretary-General of the Socialist Youth
- In office 20 July 2008 – 18 July 2010
- Preceded by: Pedro Nuno Santos
- Succeeded by: Pedro Delgado Alves

Member of the Assembly of the Republic
- In office 20 June 2011 – 23 October 2015
- Constituency: Setúbal
- In office 15 October 2009 – 20 June 2011
- Constituency: Lisbon

Personal details
- Born: José Duarte Piteira Rica Silvestre Cordeiro; 23 February 1979 (age 47)
- Party: Socialist Party
- Education: University of Lisbon

José Duarte Piteira Rica Silvestre Cordeiro (born 23 February 1979) is a Portuguese economist and politician of the Socialist Party (PS) who served as a Minister of the Environment and Climate Action in the XXIII Constitutional Government of Portugal of Prime Minister António Costa from 2022 to 2024.

== Political career ==
From 2019 to 2022, Cordeiro served as State Secretary of Parliamentary Affairs. In the negotiations to form a coalition government unter Costa following the 2019 elections, he was part of his party’s delegation.

In September 2022, Cordeiro put a capacity of 10 gigawatts (GW) on offer for Portugal’s debut offshore wind power auction in 2023, doubling the government’s original target at the start of the year. Under his leadership, the government invested 3 billion euros ($2.91 billion) in its electricity and natural gas systems in 2023 to lower energy prices paid by companies. In 2023, he announced plans to launch a pioneering auction for rights to sell hydrogen for injection into the national gas grid.
