= Jamila Madeira =

Portuguese politician

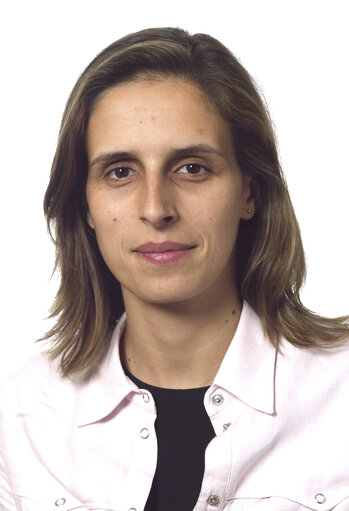
Jamila Madeira

Jamila Madeira (born 17 July 1975) is a Portuguese politician and Member of the European Parliament for the Socialist Party; part of the Party of European Socialists.

She was part of the National Board of Juventude Socialista from 1994 to 2000, and then became its General Secretary from 2000 to 2004. She was a member of the Assembly of the Republic from 1999 to 2004.
