= Ministry of Infrastructure and Housing (Portugal) =

Government ministry of Portugal

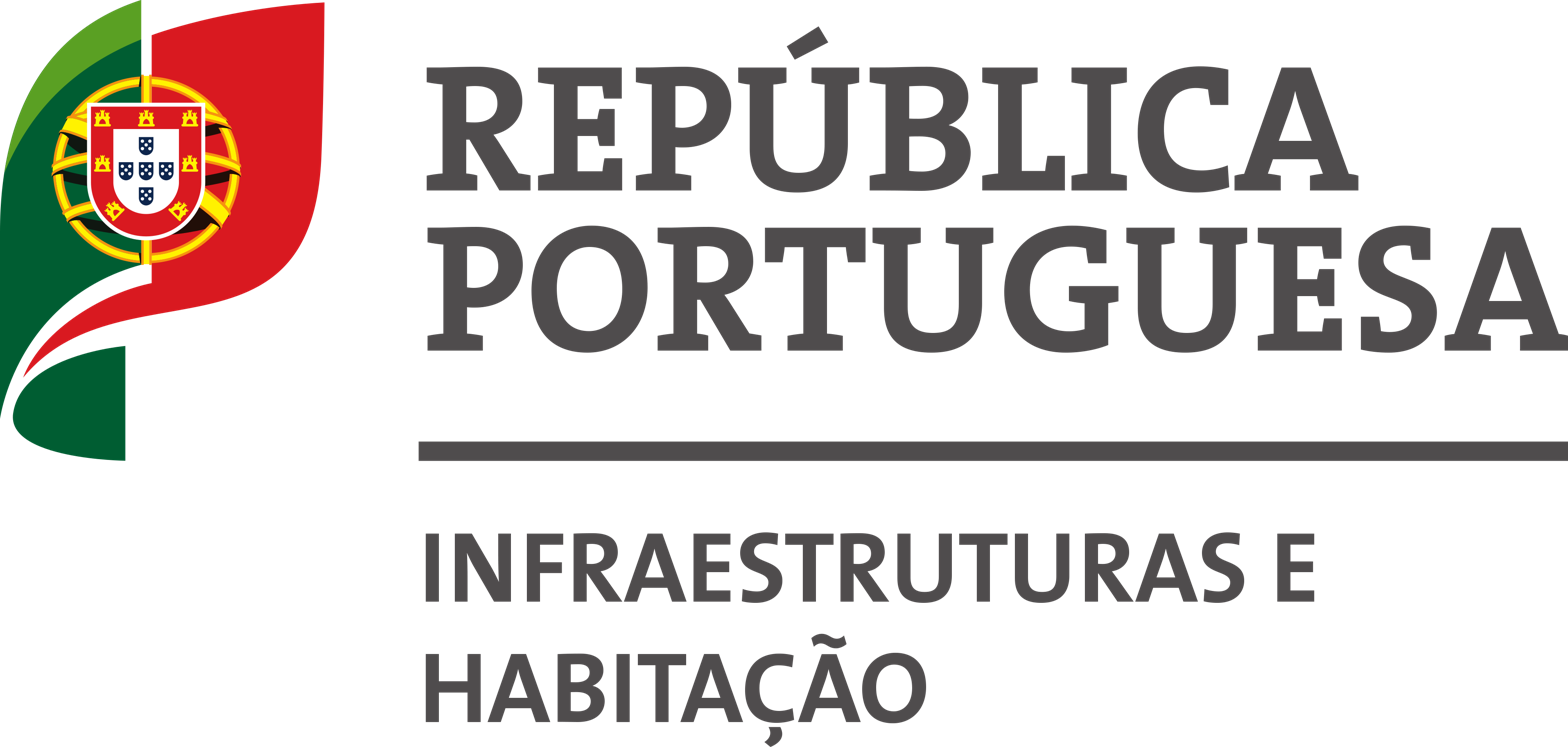

The Ministry of Infrastructure and Housing (Portuguese: Ministério das Infraestruturas e da Habitação) is a Portuguese government ministry.

== Ministers ==
- Pedro Nuno Santos (2019–2023)
- Miguel Pinto Luz (since 2024)
