= Pedro Nuno Santos =

Portuguese politician (born 1977)

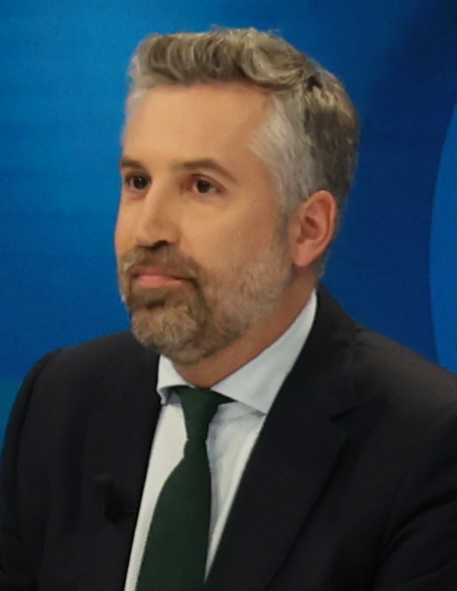
- Santos in 2025

Secretary-General of the Socialist Party
- In office 7 January 2024 – 24 May 2025
- President: Carlos César
- Preceded by: António Costa
- Succeeded by: José Luís Carneiro

Leader of the Opposition
- In office 2 April 2024 – 24 May 2025
- Prime Minister: Luís Montenegro
- Preceded by: Luís Montenegro
- Succeeded by: Carlos César (acting) André Ventura

Minister of Infrastructure and Housing
- In office 18 February 2019 – 4 January 2023
- Prime Minister: António Costa
- Preceded by: Pedro Marques (Infrastructure)
- Succeeded by: João Galamba (Infrastructure); Marina Gonçalves (Housing)

Secretary of State for Parliamentary Affairs
- In office 26 November 2015 – 18 February 2019
- Prime Minister: António Costa
- Preceded by: Pedro Lomba
- Succeeded by: Duarte Cordeiro

Member of the Assembly of the Republic
- Incumbent
- Assumed office 10 March 2005
- Constituency: Aveiro

Secretary-General of the Socialist Youth
- In office 18 July 2004 – 20 July 2008
- Preceded by: Jamila Madeira
- Succeeded by: Duarte Cordeiro

Personal details
- Born: 13 April 1977 (age 49) São João da Madeira, Portugal
- Party: Socialist Party
- Other political affiliations: Socialist Youth
- Spouse: Ana Catarina Gamboa
- Children: 1
- Education: ISEG - Lisbon School of Economics and Management
- Occupation: Economist • Politician

Pedro Nuno de Oliveira Santos (born 13 April 1977) is a Portuguese economist and politician, who served as the Secretary-General of the Socialist Party from January 2024 to May 2025. Santos previously held positions in the Portuguese Government under António Costa, first as Secretary of State for Parliamentary Affairs, from November 2015 to February 2019, and afterwards as Minister of Infrastructure and Housing, from February 2019 to December 2022.

Santos has a degree in economics from ISEG-UTL. He was Secretary-General of the Socialist Youth from 2004 to 2008, and a member of the Assembly of the Republic in the 10th and 12th Legislatures. As Secretary of State for Parliamentary Affairs in the XXI Constitutional Government, he was responsible for coordinating the confidence and supply agreement with the Communist Party, the Left Bloc and "The Greens", a government solution that became colloquially known as the geringonça.

In December 2023, Santos was elected to succeed António Costa as Secretary-General of the Socialist Party. He assumed office on 7 January 2024.

Under his leadership, the PS lost both the 2024 and 2025 legislative elections, suffering a steep decline in votes and seats in both, and Santos announced his resignation after the latter.

== Early life and career ==
Santos is the son of Maria Augusta Leite de Oliveira Santos and Américo Augusto dos Santos, entrepreneur of the Tecmacal group, in the footwear and industrial equipment industries, from São João da Madeira, and for some time councilor for the PS in the Municipal Chamber (Town Hall) of that city.

In the associative field, Pedro Nuno Santos was President of the Student Association of the Dr. Serafim Leite Secondary School, in São João da Madeira, chairman of the Board of the General Meeting of Students (RGA) of the Superior Institute of Economics and Management (ISEG) of the Technical University of Lisbon and Member of the Directorate of the Student Association of the same, where he graduated in Economics.

== Political career ==
Santos served a term as President of the Parish Assembly of São João da Madeira, Deputy of the Municipal Assembly of São João da Madeira, President of the Aveiro Federation of Socialist Youth and General Secretary of Socialist Youth (2004-2008).

He was a Deputy in the 10th and 12th Legislature, having been, in the last Legislature, responsible for the Economy Commission and the Parliamentary Inquiry Commission into the BES case and was vice-president of the Socialist Party Parliamentary Group and member of the Permanent Commission of the Assembly of the Republic. He was President of the Federation of Aveiro of the Socialist Party.

=== Secretary of State for Parliamentary Affairs (2015–2019) ===
In António Costa's first government, Santos held the position of Secretary of State for Parliamentary Affairs and was responsible for coordinating the parties that formed the governing solution known as "geringonça" and that joined the Socialist Party, the Communist Party, the Left Bloc and Ecologist Party "The Greens".

Santos has asserted himself as a possible candidate for PS leader, in succession to António Costa.

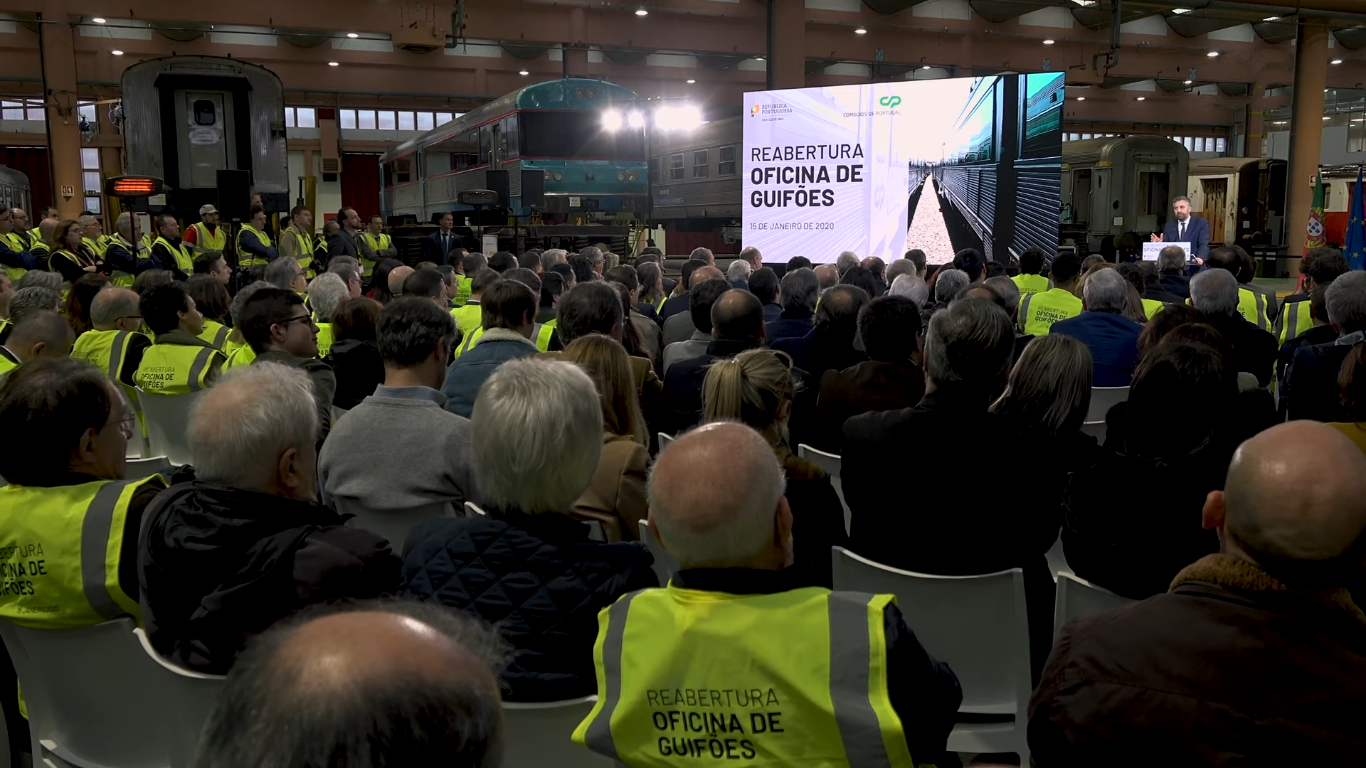
Pedro Nuno Santos makes a speech during the reopening of Portuguese Railways Maintenance Workshop in Guifões, Matosinhos, in January 2020.

=== Minister of Infrastructure and Housing (2019–2022) ===
Santos served as Minister of Infrastructure and Housing in the XXII Constitutional Government.

The investment in the railroad has been at the center of his concerns and since he took office there have been several investments made in this area, starting with the implementation of Railroad 2020. At CP, he has been responsible for a new plan for the recovery of rolling stock, which has allowed to put into service dozens of carriages and locomotives parked for many years.

He was the face of the solution found to save TAP, through public support approved in Brussels, in the amount of 1.2 billion euros, which allowed the State to keep 72.5% of the national airline. This support was equivalent to that given to all other national companies.

He has been a supporter of the construction of the new Lisbon airport at Montijo, and in the face of opposition from the Seixal and Moita municipalities to this work, he came to affirm that the law that gives this power to municipalities should be changed.

In December 2022, Santos stepped down from his post, following a public backlash over a hefty severance pay a secretary of state received from state-owned airline TAP, which fell under his remit. He was succeeded by João Galamba and Marina Gonçalves.

=== Secretary-General of the Socialist Party ===
On 13 November 2023, Santos publicly announced his candidacy for the election of the new leader of the Portuguese Socialist Party, which had been called following the resignation of António Costa from his role as Prime Minister and the scheduling of snap legislative elections.

On 16 December of the same year, he was officially elected as the party's new Secretary-General, winning against José Luís Carneiro with about 62% of all votes. After the party lost 20 seats at the general election in May 2025, Santos resigned as leader.

== Political positions ==
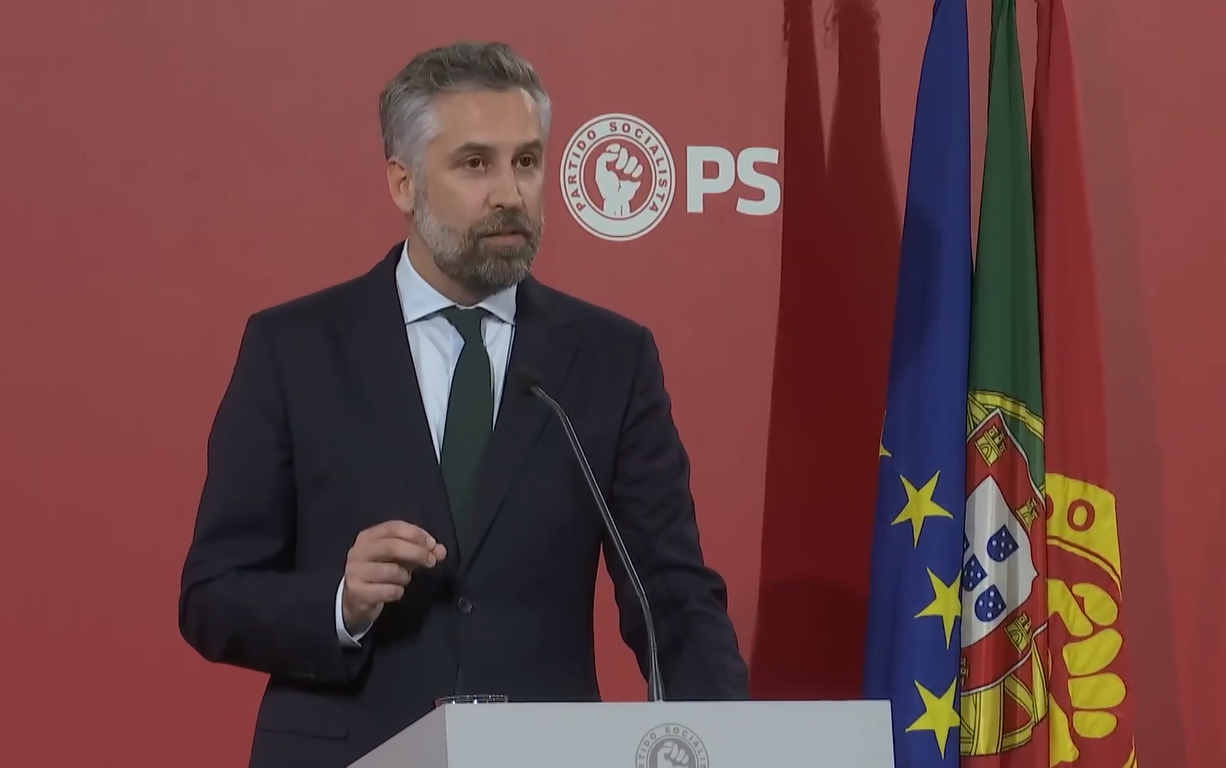
Pedro Nuno Santos announcing the abstention of PS in the State Budget of 2025

Santos is one of the faces on the left wing of the PS, even attending the Avante! Festival. In an interview he said that "before there was a left wing in the PS, today there is a small right wing." Since the time he was JS leader, Santos has defended understandings between the parties of the Portuguese left.

In December 2011, when Portugal was facing a sovereign debt crisis, in a PS Christmas dinner in Castelo de Paiva, Santos suggested that Portugal could threaten not to pay its sovereign debt in those situations, and advocated that the government should question the demands of international creditors, including German bankers, or renegotiate the debt to save the Portuguese from the sacrifices of austerity.

== Recognition ==
- Great Cross of Merit of the Order of Merit of the Federal Republic of Germany (May 26, 2009)

== Personal life ==
Santos is 1.88 m tall. He is married to Ana Catarina Gamboa, with whom he has a son. Gamboa was also a member of the Socialist Youth and worked as Chief of Staff of the Assistant Secretary of State and Parliamentary Affairs, while Santos was Minister of Infrastructure and Housing.

== Electoral history ==
=== São João da Madeira City Council election, 2009 ===
Ballot: 11 October 2009
Party	Candidate	Votes	%	Seats	+/−
PSD	Manuel Castro Almeida	6,523	56.0	5	±0
PS	Pedro Nuno Santos	3,077	26.4	2	+1
CDS–PP	Dina Rocha	833	7.2	0	–1
CDU	Jorge Cortez	672	5.8	0	±0
BE	Pedro Pardal	310	2.7	0	±0
Blank/Invalid ballots		243	2.1	–	–
Turnout		11,658	58.35	7	±0
Source: Autárquicas 2009

=== PS leadership election, 2023 ===
Ballot: 15 and 16 December 2023
Candidate	Votes	%
Pedro Nuno Santos	24,219	60.8
José Luís Carneiro	14,891	37.4
Daniel Adrião	382	1.0
Blank/Invalid ballots	322	0.8
Turnout	39,814	68.65
Source: Diretas 2023

=== Legislative election, 2024 ===
Ballot: 10 March 2024
Party	Candidate	Votes	%	Seats	+/−
AD	Luís Montenegro	1,867,442	28.8	80	+3
PS	Pedro Nuno Santos	1,812,443	28.0	78	–42
Chega	André Ventura	1,169,781	18.1	50	+38
IL	Rui Rocha	319,877	4.9	8	±0
BE	Mariana Mortágua	282,314	4.4	5	±0
CDU	Paulo Raimundo	205,551	3.2	4	–2
Livre	Rui Tavares	204,875	3.2	4	+3
PAN	Inês Sousa Real	126,125	2.0	1	±0
ADN	Bruno Fialho	102,134	1.6	0	±0
Other parties		104,167	1.6	0	±0
Blank/Invalid ballots		282,243	4.4	–	–
Turnout		6,476,952	59.90	230	±0
Source: Comissão Nacional de Eleições

=== Legislative election, 2025 ===
Ballot: 18 May 2025
Party	Candidate	Votes	%	Seats	+/−
AD	Luís Montenegro	2,008,488	31.8	91	+11
PS	Pedro Nuno Santos	1,442,546	22.8	58	–20
Chega	André Ventura	1,438,554	22.8	60	+10
IL	Rui Rocha	338,974	5.4	9	+1
Livre	Rui Tavares	257,291	4.1	6	+2
CDU	Paulo Raimundo	183,686	2.9	3	–1
BE	Mariana Mortágua	125,808	2.0	1	–4
PAN	Inês Sousa Real	86,930	1.4	1	±0
ADN	Bruno Fialho	81,660	1.3	0	±0
Other parties		95,384	1.5	1	+1
Blank/Invalid ballots		260,648	4.1	–	–
Turnout		6,319,969	58.25	230	±0
Source: Comissão Nacional de Eleições

Political offices
Preceded by Pedro Lomba	Secretary of State for Parliamentary Affairs; 2015–2019	Succeeded by Duarte Cordeiro
Preceded by Pedro Marques (Infrastructure)	Minister of Infrastructure and Housing; 2019–2023	Succeeded by João Galamba (Infrastructure); Marina Gonçalves (Housing)
Preceded by Luís Montenegro	Leader of the Opposition; 2024–2025	Succeeded by André Ventura
Party political offices
Preceded by Jamila Madeira	Secretary-General of the Socialist Youth; 2004–2008	Succeeded by Duarte Cordeiro
Preceded by António Costa	Secretary-General of the Socialist Party; 2024–2025	Succeeded by José Luís Carneiro
