= Socialist Youth (Portugal) =

Youth organisation of the Socialist Party of Portugal

Socialist Youth Juventude Socialista
- Secretary General: Sofia Pereira
- Founded: February 1975
- Headquarters: Lisbon, Portugal
- Ideology: Social democracy Democratic socialism Progressivism; Pro-Europeanism
- Position: Centre-left
- Mother party: Socialist Party
- International affiliation: International Union of Socialist Youth
- European affiliation: Young European Socialists
- Website: juventudesocialista.pt

Socialist Youth (Portuguese: Juventude Socialista) is the youth organisation of the Socialist Party of Portugal.

The Socialist Youth (JS) is a political organization that emerges as a youth party of the Socialist Party. It is integrated, politically and ideologically, into democratic socialism and social-democracy. It is made up of young people over 14 and under 30, Portuguese or resident in Portugal. Currently, the organization’s Secretary-General is Sofia Pereira, chosen in the XXIV National Congress of the JS that took place in December 2024.

It is a political organization of young Portuguese who accept the political platform approved in Congress, the Declaration of Principles and Program of the Socialist Party, with the aim of building a more just and solidary society in Portugal.

The Socialist Youth finds in this political and ideological current a progressive project of social transformation, centered on the values of Equality, Solidarity and Freedom.

== Values ==
The organisation is composed of young people who advocate for a society free of injustices, inequalities and poverty and that promotes respect and tolerance. It supports sustainable development and the respect and protection of the environment. Some of its stated objectives include promoting a society that provides access to education, health care, social protection and rights-based employment for all. The organisation describes itself as internationalist and advocates for peace. The organisation's political activities also include seeking alternatives to a world it sees as being characterised by inequality, poverty and war.

== Ends ==
The Socialist Youth is a political youth organization that strives for the implementation of the values of democratic socialism and of the Republic, aiming for a freer, fairer and more solidary society, respecting the principles of respect for the dignity of the human person, pluralism of expression and internal and external democracy.

The Socialist Youth strive to correct social inequalities by implementing a political platform that promotes the integration of individuals into the community in which they live, regardless of their ancestry, gender, age, ethnicity, sexual orientation, language, origin, religion, political, philosophical or ideological convictions, education or economic situation. The action of the Socialist Youth aims at the internationalization of democratic socialism. The Socialist Youth contribute to the peaceful resolution of any international conflicts, as well as to safeguarding the right of self-determination of all peoples. The Socialist Youth condemns and fights against any form of armed aggression or terrorist practice, regardless of its ideological or political support. The Socialist Youth is committed to the construction of a European Union that takes international responsibility for the values and democratic principles that guide the Peoples of Europe and the Portuguese Republic. The Socialist Youth contribute to the formation, participation and political representation of the Portuguese youth.

== Structures of the Socialist Youth ==
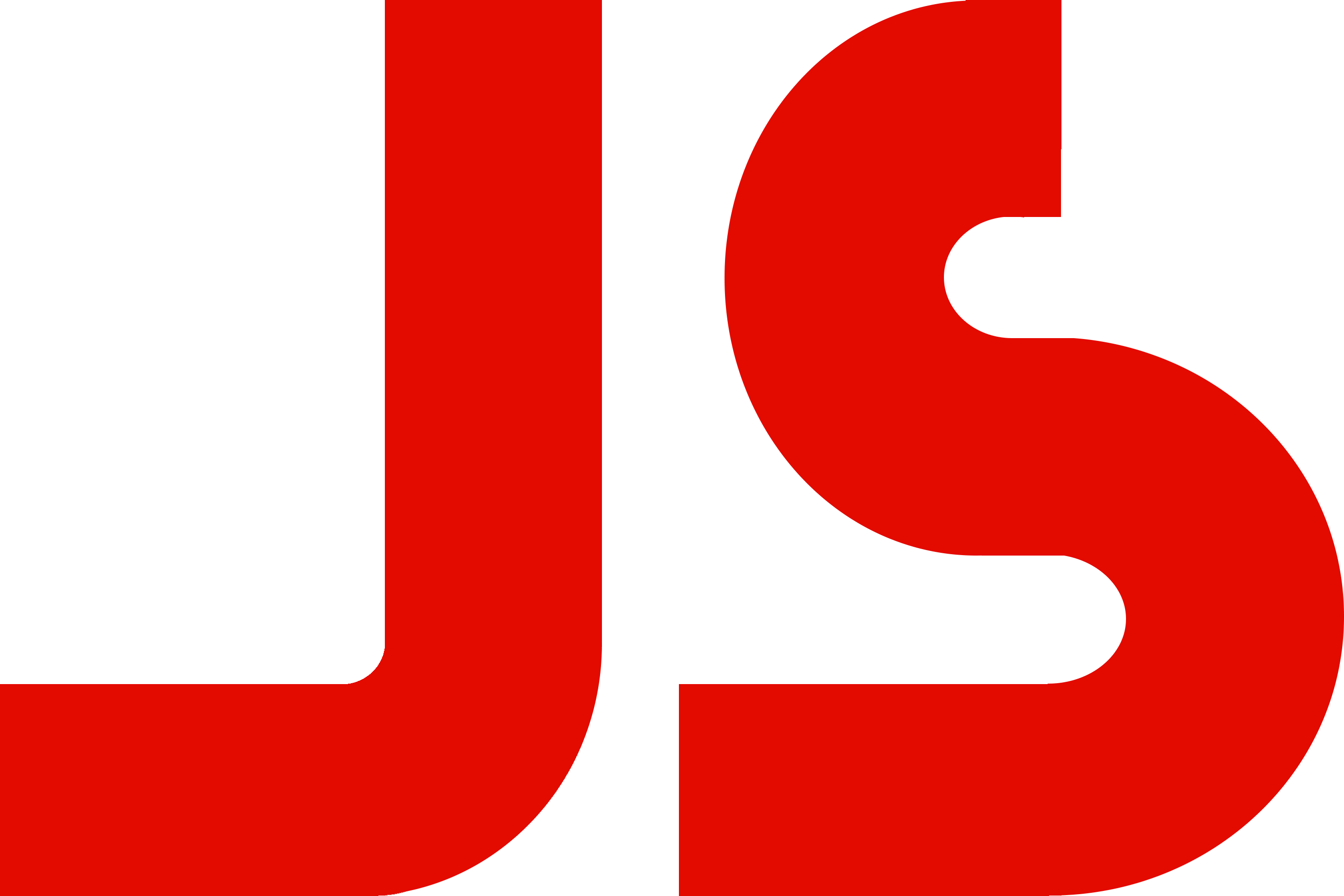
JS logo in the 1970's and 1980's

=== Local and National Intervention ===
JS operates locally, through its Concelhias structures. These, in turn, are organized into 21 District and Regional Federations.

=== Autarchic Intervention ===
In addition to these structures, the National Association of Young Socialist Authors (ANJAS) coordinates the work of local elected officials in the parishes and municipalities, disseminating good practices and assisting political coordination at the level of local power.

=== Organization of Socialist Students ===
The National Organization of Socialist Students (OES) is the representative structure of all students affiliated to the Socialist Youth and organizes itself in school, federative and national structures. As a result of the statutory changes introduced at the end of 2014, the structure merges into the same organization the former National Organization of Socialist Students of Higher Education (ONESES) and the National Organization of Socialist Students of Basic and Secondary Education (ONESEBS).

The OES is responsible for pronouncing on the general lines of orientation and political intervention of the JS in the areas of Educational Policy, contributing to the articulation of the national intervention of the JS in Educational Institutions, namely through the formulation of proposals to the other organs of the Socialist Youth and manage the national network of Federations and Nuclei of Socialist Students.

The Nucleus of Socialist Students (NES) aims to represent the Socialist Youth in the institutions of Education where they are inserted, namely by stimulating the political debate and the diffusion of the program and decisions of the Socialist Youth. On the other hand, each NES is free to promote the activities that it deems appropriate, as well as to pronounce itself on the subjects related to the Establishment where it is inserted, in articulation with OES and with its Federation, when it exists.

=== Trade Union Intervention ===
More recently, JS has created its Young Socialist Tendency, seeking to integrate into a national structure the nuclei in the area of employment and trade unionism.

== International intervention ==
On the external front, JS is a founding member of the European organization of young socialists ECOSY (now called YES - Young European Socialists), and is particularly committed to deepening the European project and strengthening its democratic and social components.

Working in support of an international order based on the principles of the Charter of the United Nations, JS is also a member of the IUSY - International Union of Socialist Youth and has reinforced its intervention in cooperation between organizations of Portuguese-speaking countries and the Ibero-American space .

== List of secretaries-general ==
No.	Portrait	Name	Term in office		Secretary-general of PS
No.	Portrait	Name	Start	End	Secretary-general of PS
1		Alberto Arons de Carvalho (b. 1949)	16 February 1975	3 December 1978	Mário Soares
2		José Leitão (b. 1950)	3 December 1978	11 January 1981	Mário Soares
3		Margarida Marques (b. 1954)	11 January 1981	5 February 1984	Mário Soares
4		José Apolinário (b. 1962)	5 February 1984	29 April 1990	Mário Soares
4		José Apolinário (b. 1962)	5 February 1984	29 April 1990	António de Almeida Santos (interim)
4		José Apolinário (b. 1962)	5 February 1984	29 April 1990	António Macedo (interim)
4		José Apolinário (b. 1962)	5 February 1984	29 April 1990	Vítor Constâncio
4		José Apolinário (b. 1962)	5 February 1984	29 April 1990	Jorge Sampaio
5		António José Seguro (b. 1962)	29 April 1990	6 March 1994	Jorge Sampaio
5		António José Seguro (b. 1962)	29 April 1990	6 March 1994	António Guterres
6		Sérgio Sousa Pinto (b. 1972)	6 March 1994	14 May 2000	António Guterres
7		Jamila Madeira (b. 1975)	14 May 2000	18 July 2004	António Guterres
7		Jamila Madeira (b. 1975)	14 May 2000	18 July 2004	Eduardo Ferro Rodrigues
8		Pedro Nuno Santos (b. 1977)	18 July 2004	20 July 2008	Eduardo Ferro Rodrigues
8		Pedro Nuno Santos (b. 1977)	18 July 2004	20 July 2008	José Sócrates
9		Duarte Cordeiro (b. 1979)	20 July 2008	18 July 2010	José Sócrates
10		Pedro Delgado Alves (b. 1980)	18 July 2010	4 November 2012	José Sócrates
10		Pedro Delgado Alves (b. 1980)	18 July 2010	4 November 2012	António José Seguro
11		João Torres (b. 1986)	4 November 2012	18 December 2016	António José Seguro
11		João Torres (b. 1986)	4 November 2012	18 December 2016	Maria de Belém Roseira (interim)
11		João Torres (b. 1986)	4 November 2012	18 December 2016	António Costa
12		Ivan Costa Gonçalves (b. 1987)	18 December 2016	16 December 2018	António Costa
13		Maria Begonha (b. 1989)	16 December 2018	13 December 2020	António Costa
14		Miguel Costa Matos (b. 1994)	13 December 2020	15 December 2024	António Costa
14		Miguel Costa Matos (b. 1994)	13 December 2020	15 December 2024	Pedro Nuno Santos
15		Sofia Pereira (b. 1999)	15 December 2024	Incumbent	Pedro Nuno Santos
15		Sofia Pereira (b. 1999)	15 December 2024	Incumbent	Carlos César (interim)
15		Sofia Pereira (b. 1999)	15 December 2024	Incumbent	José Luís Carneiro
