= Santarém (Assembly of the Republic constituency) =

Constituency of the Assembly of the Republic, the national legislature of Portugal

- Constituency for the Assembly of the Republic
- Location of Santarém within Portugal
- District: Santarém
- Population: 4446,393 (2024)
- Electorate: 377,415 (2025)
- Area: 6,718 km^{2} (2024)

Current Constituency
- Created: 1976
- Seats: List: 9 (2015–present); 10 (1991–2015); 12 (1979–1991); 13 (1976–1979)
- Deputies: List: Inês Barroso (PSD); Ricardo Carlos (PSD); Pedro Correia (CH); Hugo Costa (PS); José Dotti (CH); Isaura Morais (PSD); Ricardo Oliveira (PSD); Marcos Perestrello (PS); Catarina Salgueiro (CH)

Santarém is one of the 22 multi-member constituencies of the Assembly of the Republic, the national legislature of Portugal. The constituency was established in 1976 when the Assembly of the Republic was established by the constitution following the restoration of democracy. It is conterminous with the district of Santarém. The constituency currently elects nine of the 230 members of the Assembly of the Republic using the closed party-list proportional representation electoral system. At the 2025 legislative election it had 377,415 registered electors.

== Electoral system ==
Santarém currently elects nine of the 230 members of the Assembly of the Republic using the closed party-list proportional representation electoral system. Seats are allocated using the D'Hondt method.

== Election results ==
=== Summary ===
Election	Unitary Democrats CDU / APU / PCP			Left Bloc BE / UDP			LIVRE L			Socialists PS / FRS			People Animals Nature PAN			Democratic Renewal PRD			Social Democrats PSD / PàF / AD / PPD			Liberals IL			CDS – People's CDS–PP / CDS			Chega CH / PPV/CDC / PPV		
Election	Votes	%	Seats	Votes	%	Seats	Votes	%	Seats	Votes	%	Seats	Votes	%	Seats	Votes	%	Seats	Votes	%	Seats	Votes	%	Seats	Votes	%	Seats	Votes	%	Seats
2025	8,781	3.69%	0	4,371	1.84%	0	7,860	3.30%	0	55,570	23.34%	2	2,751	1.16%	0				74,742	31.39%	4	9,597	4.03%	0				68,742	28.87%	3
2024	10,346	4.23%	0	11,207	4.59%	0	6,190	2.53%	0	69,948	28.62%	3	3,930	1.61%	0				68,519	28.04%	3	9,497	3.89%	0				58,588	23.97%	3
2022	11,855	5.56%	0	10,011	4.69%	0	1,932	0.91%	0	89,980	42.17%	5	2,527	1.18%	0				58,531	27.43%	3	8,219	3.85%	0	4,137	1.94%	0	23,813	11.16%	1
2019	15,663	7.96%	1	21,141	10.74%	1	1,783	0.91%	0	76,833	39.02%	4	5,368	2.73%	0				52,145	26.48%	3	1,606	0.82%	0	9,793	4.97%	0	4,211	2.14%	0
2015	21,960	10.05%	1	24,481	11.21%	1	1,237	0.57%	0	74,852	34.26%	3	2,722	1.25%	0				81,530	37.32%	4							492	0.23%	0
2011	21,347	9.45%	1	13,712	6.07%	0				61,194	27.10%	3	2,220	0.98%	0				88,955	39.39%	5				29,073	12.87%	1			
2009	22,722	9.54%	1	29,196	12.26%	1				83,135	34.91%	4							66,520	27.94%	3				27,662	11.62%	1	545	0.23%	0
2005	21,879	8.90%	1	16,590	6.74%	0				117,193	47.65%	6							67,021	27.25%	3				17,607	7.16%	0			
2002	20,748	8.73%	1	6,760	2.84%	0				93,164	39.19%	4							92,562	38.94%	4				20,410	8.59%	1			
1999	24,564	10.36%	1	4,800	2.03%	0				110,345	46.55%	5							73,307	30.93%	3				19,560	8.25%	1			
1995	25,647	9.72%	1	1,793	0.68%	0				123,379	46.77%	5							83,580	31.68%	3				23,466	8.89%	1			
1991	25,922	9.97%	1							78,232	30.10%	3				2,628	1.01%	0	130,555	50.23%	6				8,823	3.39%	0			
1987	33,688	12.96%	1	2,617	1.01%	0				57,778	22.22%	3				19,562	7.52%	1	127,788	49.14%	7				9,674	3.72%	0			
1985	45,468	16.75%	2	3,091	1.14%	0				51,459	18.95%	2				66,099	24.35%	3	77,118	28.40%	4				21,369	7.87%	1			
1983	54,473	20.58%	3	2,677	1.01%	0				104,824	39.61%	5							67,238	25.41%	3				27,312	10.32%	1			
1980	55,248	19.49%	2	3,482	1.23%	0				88,389	31.17%	4							122,261	43.12%	6									
1979	62,713	22.40%	3	6,280	2.24%	0				78,893	28.18%	3							118,494	42.33%	6									
1976	43,841	17.06%	2	4,533	1.76%	0				104,422	40.64%	6							53,138	20.68%	3				37,699	14.67%	2			

(Figures in italics represent alliances.)

=== Detailed ===
==== 2020s ====
===== 2025 =====
Results of the 2025 legislative election held on 18 May 2025:

Party		Votes	%	Seats
Democratic Alliance	AD	74,742	31.39%	4
Chega	CH	68,742	28.87%	3
Socialist Party	PS	55,570	23.34%	2
Liberal Initiative	IL	9,597	4.03%	0
Unitary Democratic Coalition	CDU	8,781	3.69%	0
LIVRE	L	7,860	3.30%	0
Left Bloc	BE	4,371	1.84%	0
National Democratic Alternative	ADN	3,971	1.67%	0
People Animals Nature	PAN	2,751	1.16%	0
React, Include, Recycle	RIR	539	0.23%	0
Volt Portugal	Volt	498	0.21%	0
Ergue-te	E	424	0.18%	0
People's Monarchist Party	PPM	247	0.10%	0
Valid votes		238,093	100.00%	9
Blank votes		3,703	1.52%	
Rejected votes – other		2,381	0.98%	
Total polled		244,177	64.70%	
Registered electors		377,415		

The following candidates were elected:: Fernando Alexandre (AD); Pedro Correia (CH); Hugo Costa (PS); José Dotti (CH); Isaura Morais (AD); João Moura (AD); Ricardo Oliveira (AD); Marcos Perestrello (PS); and Catarina Salgueiro (CH).

===== 2024 =====
Results of the 2024 legislative election held on 10 March 2024:

Party		Votes	%	Seats
Socialist Party	PS	69,948	28.62%	3
Democratic Alliance	AD	68,519	28.04%	3
Chega	CH	58,588	23.97%	3
Left Bloc	BE	11,207	4.59%	0
Unitary Democratic Coalition	CDU	10,346	4.23%	0
Liberal Initiative	IL	9,497	3.89%	0
LIVRE	L	6,190	2.53%	0
People Animals Nature	PAN	3,930	1.61%	0
National Democratic Alternative	ADN	3,509	1.44%	0
React, Include, Recycle	RIR	951	0.39%	0
Volt Portugal	Volt	568	0.23%	0
New Right	ND	464	0.19%	0
Ergue-te	E	366	0.15%	0
Alternative 21 (Earth Party and Alliance)	PT-A	295	0.12%	0
Valid votes		244,378	100.00%	9
Blank votes		3,868	1.54%	
Rejected votes – other		2,815	1.12%	
Total polled		251,061	66.55%	
Registered electors		377,261		

The following candidates were elected: Luísa Areosa (CH); Mara Lagriminha Coelho (PS;); Pedro Correia (CH); Hugo Costa (PS); Pedro dos Santos Frazão (CH); Alexandra Leitão (PS); Isaura Morais (AD); João Moura (AD); and Eduardo Oliveira e Sousa (AD).

===== 2022 =====
Results of the 2022 legislative election held on 30 January 2022:

Party		Votes	%	Seats
Socialist Party	PS	89,980	42.17%	5
Social Democratic Party	PSD	58,531	27.43%	3
Chega	CH	23,813	11.16%	1
Unitary Democratic Coalition	CDU	11,855	5.56%	0
Left Bloc	BE	10,011	4.69%	0
Liberal Initiative	IL	8,219	3.85%	0
CDS – People's Party	CDS–PP	4,137	1.94%	0
People Animals Nature	PAN	2,527	1.18%	0
LIVRE	L	1,932	0.91%	0
React, Include, Recycle	RIR	901	0.42%	0
Socialist Alternative Movement	MAS	383	0.18%	0
Earth Party	PT	314	0.15%	0
Volt Portugal	Volt	311	0.15%	0
Ergue-te	E	284	0.13%	0
Portuguese Labour Party	PTP	162	0.08%	0
Valid votes		213,360	100.00%	9
Blank votes		2,773	1.27%	
Rejected votes – other		2,060	0.94%	
Total polled		218,193	57.72%	
Registered electors		378,006		

The following candidates were elected: Manuel dos Santos Afonso (PS); Maria do Céu Antunes (PS); Inês Barroso (PSD); Mara Lagriminha Coelho (PS;); Hugo Costa (PS); Pedro dos Santos Frazão (CH); Alexandra Leitão (PS); Isaura Morais (PSD); and João Moura (PSD).

==== 2010s ====
===== 2019 =====
Results of the 2019 legislative election held on 6 October 2019:

Party		Votes	%	Seats
Socialist Party	PS	76,833	39.02%	4
Social Democratic Party	PSD	52,145	26.48%	3
Left Bloc	BE	21,141	10.74%	1
Unitary Democratic Coalition	CDU	15,663	7.96%	1
CDS – People's Party	CDS–PP	9,793	4.97%	0
People Animals Nature	PAN	5,368	2.73%	0
Chega	CH	4,211	2.14%	0
LIVRE	L	1,783	0.91%	0
Alliance	A	1,698	0.86%	0
Liberal Initiative	IL	1,606	0.82%	0
Portuguese Workers' Communist Party	PCTP	1,433	0.73%	0
React, Include, Recycle	RIR	1,267	0.64%	0
National Renewal Party	PNR	831	0.42%	0
We, the Citizens!	NC	814	0.41%	0
Democratic Republican Party	PDR	600	0.30%	0
United Party of Retirees and Pensioners	PURP	496	0.25%	0
Earth Party	PT	475	0.24%	0
People's Monarchist Party	PPM	468	0.24%	0
Portuguese Labour Party	PTP	264	0.13%	0
Valid votes		196,889	100.00%	9
Blank votes		6,021	2.91%	
Rejected votes – other		3,997	1.93%	
Total polled		206,907	54.32%	
Registered electors		380,900		

The following candidates were elected: Maria do Céu Antunes (PS); Fabíola Cardoso (BE); Hugo Costa (PS); António Filipe (CDU); António Gameiro (PS); Alexandra Leitão (PS); Duarte Marques (PSD); Isaura Morais (PSD); and João Moura (PSD).

===== 2015 =====
Results of the 2015 legislative election held on 4 October 2015:

Party		Votes	%	Seats
Portugal Ahead	PàF	81,530	37.32%	4
Socialist Party	PS	74,852	34.26%	3
Left Bloc	BE	24,481	11.21%	1
Unitary Democratic Coalition	CDU	21,960	10.05%	1
Portuguese Workers' Communist Party	PCTP	3,058	1.40%	0
People Animals Nature	PAN	2,722	1.25%	0
Democratic Republican Party	PDR	2,373	1.09%	0
LIVRE	L	1,237	0.57%	0
National Renewal Party	PNR	1,206	0.55%	0
The Earth Party Movement	MPT	1,036	0.47%	0
We, the Citizens!	NC	932	0.43%	0
ACT! (Portuguese Labour Party and Socialist Alternative Movement)	AGIR	930	0.43%	0
United Party of Retirees and Pensioners	PURP	827	0.38%	0
People's Monarchist Party	PPM	821	0.38%	0
Citizenship and Christian Democracy	PPV/CDC	492	0.23%	0
Valid votes		218,457	100.00%	9
Blank votes		5,139	2.26%	
Rejected votes – other		3,948	1.74%	
Total polled		227,544	57.86%	
Registered electors		393,250		

The following candidates were elected: Teresa Leal Coelho (PàF); António Filipe (CDU); Patrícia Fonseca (PàF); António Gameiro (PS); Duarte Marques (PàF); Carlos Matias (BE); Nuno Serra (PàF); Idália Salvador Serrão (PS); and Vieira da Silva (PS).

===== 2011 =====
Results of the 2011 legislative election held on 5 June 2011:

Party		Votes	%	Seats
Social Democratic Party	PSD	88,955	39.39%	5
Socialist Party	PS	61,194	27.10%	3
CDS – People's Party	CDS–PP	29,073	12.87%	1
Unitary Democratic Coalition	CDU	21,347	9.45%	1
Left Bloc	BE	13,712	6.07%	0
Portuguese Workers' Communist Party	PCTP	3,413	1.51%	0
Party for Animals and Nature	PAN	2,220	0.98%	0
The Earth Party Movement	MPT	1,454	0.64%	0
Hope for Portugal Movement	MEP	1,151	0.51%	0
National Renewal Party	PNR	832	0.37%	0
People's Monarchist Party	PPM	726	0.32%	0
Portuguese Labour Party	PTP	692	0.31%	0
New Democracy Party	ND	620	0.27%	0
Workers' Party of Socialist Unity	POUS	439	0.19%	0
Valid votes		225,828	100.00%	10
Blank votes		6,999	2.96%	
Rejected votes – other		3,473	1.47%	
Total polled		236,300	58.87%	
Registered electors		401,375		

The following candidates were elected: Filipe Lobo d'Ávila (CDS-PP); Vasco Cunha (PSD); António Filipe (CDU); João Galamba (PS); Duarte Marques (PSD); Carina Oliveira (PSD); Miguel Relvas (PSD); Nuno Serra (PSD); António Serrano (PS); and Idália Salvador Serrão (PS).

==== 2000s ====
===== 2009 =====
Results of the 2009 legislative election held on 27 September 2009:

Party		Votes	%	Seats
Socialist Party	PS	83,135	34.91%	4
Social Democratic Party	PSD	66,520	27.94%	3
Left Bloc	BE	29,196	12.26%	1
CDS – People's Party	CDS–PP	27,662	11.62%	1
Unitary Democratic Coalition	CDU	22,722	9.54%	1
Portuguese Workers' Communist Party	PCTP	3,400	1.43%	0
Hope for Portugal Movement	MEP	1,080	0.45%	0
Portuguese Labour Party	PTP	710	0.30%	0
Merit and Society Movement	MMS	643	0.27%	0
People's Monarchist Party	PPM	643	0.27%	0
National Renewal Party	PNR	588	0.25%	0
New Democracy Party	ND	586	0.25%	0
Pro-Life Party	PPV	545	0.23%	0
The Earth Party Movement and Humanist Party	MPT-PH	481	0.20%	0
Workers' Party of Socialist Unity	POUS	205	0.09%	0
Valid votes		238,116	100.00%	10
Blank votes		4,867	1.97%	
Rejected votes – other		3,537	1.43%	
Total polled		246,520	61.05%	
Registered electors		403,829		

The following candidates were elected: Filipe Lobo d'Ávila (CDS-PP); Vasco Cunha (PSD); António Filipe (CDU); João Galamba (PS); António Gameiro (PS); José Gusmão (BE); Jorge Lacão (PS); Carina Oliveira (PSD); Pacheco Pereira (PSD); and Idália Salvador Serrão (PS).

===== 2005 =====
Results of the 2005 legislative election held on 20 February 2005:

Party		Votes	%	Seats
Socialist Party	PS	117,193	47.65%	6
Social Democratic Party	PSD	67,021	27.25%	3
Unitary Democratic Coalition	CDU	21,879	8.90%	1
CDS – People's Party	CDS–PP	17,607	7.16%	0
Left Bloc	BE	16,590	6.74%	0
Portuguese Workers' Communist Party	PCTP	2,328	0.95%	0
New Democracy Party	ND	1,678	0.68%	0
Humanist Party	PH	770	0.31%	0
National Renewal Party	PNR	511	0.21%	0
Workers' Party of Socialist Unity	POUS	391	0.16%	0
Valid votes		245,968	100.00%	10
Blank votes		4,658	1.83%	
Rejected votes – other		3,364	1.32%	
Total polled		253,990	65.50%	
Registered electors		387,759		

The following candidates were elected: Mário Albuquerque (PSD); Fernanda Asseiceira (PS); Nelson Baltazar (PS); Vitalino Canas (PS); Vasco Cunha (PSD); Paulo Fonseca (PS); Jorge Lacão (PS); Luísa Mesquita (CDU); Miguel Relvas (PSD); and Idália Salvador Serrão (PS).

===== 2002 =====
Results of the 2002 legislative election held on 17 March 2002:

Party		Votes	%	Seats
Socialist Party	PS	93,164	39.19%	4
Social Democratic Party	PSD	92,562	38.94%	4
Unitary Democratic Coalition	CDU	20,748	8.73%	1
CDS – People's Party	CDS–PP	20,410	8.59%	1
Left Bloc	BE	6,760	2.84%	0
Portuguese Workers' Communist Party	PCTP	1,451	0.61%	0
People's Monarchist Party	PPM	905	0.38%	0
The Earth Party Movement	MPT	613	0.26%	0
Workers' Party of Socialist Unity	POUS	583	0.25%	0
Humanist Party	PH	501	0.21%	0
Valid votes		237,697	100.00%	10
Blank votes		2,795	1.15%	
Rejected votes – other		2,301	0.95%	
Total polled		242,793	62.43%	
Registered electors		388,875		

The following candidates were elected: Mário Albuquerque (PSD); Nelson Baltazar (PS); Vitalino Canas (PS); José Manuel Cordeiro (PSD); Luís Duque (CDS-PP); Jorge Lacão (PS); Luísa Mesquita (CDU); Luísa Portugal (PS); Miguel Relvas (PSD); and Nuno Morais Sarmento (PSD).

==== 1990s ====
===== 1999 =====
Results of the 1999 legislative election held on 10 October 1999:

Party		Votes	%	Seats
Socialist Party	PS	110,345	46.55%	5
Social Democratic Party	PSD	73,307	30.93%	3
Unitary Democratic Coalition	CDU	24,564	10.36%	1
CDS – People's Party	CDS–PP	19,560	8.25%	1
Left Bloc	BE	4,800	2.03%	0
Portuguese Workers' Communist Party	PCTP	2,502	1.06%	0
The Earth Party Movement	MPT	1,116	0.47%	0
National Solidarity Party	PSN	835	0.35%	0
Valid votes		237,029	100.00%	10
Blank votes		2,981	1.23%	
Rejected votes – other		2,520	1.04%	
Total polled		242,530	62.25%	
Registered electors		389,583		

The following candidates were elected: Mário Albuquerque (PSD); Vitalino Canas (PS); Carlos Cunha (PS); Luís Marques Guedes (PSD); Jorge Lacão (PS); António Pires de Lima (CDS-PP); Luísa Mesquita (CDU); José Miguel Noras (PS); Luísa Portugal (PS); and Miguel Relvas (PSD).

===== 1995 =====
Results of the 1995 legislative election held on 1 October 1995:

Party		Votes	%	Seats
Socialist Party	PS	123,379	46.77%	5
Social Democratic Party	PSD	83,580	31.68%	3
Unitary Democratic Coalition	CDU	25,647	9.72%	1
CDS – People's Party	CDS–PP	23,466	8.89%	1
Portuguese Workers' Communist Party	PCTP	2,528	0.96%	0
Popular Democratic Union	UDP	1,793	0.68%	0
Revolutionary Socialist Party	PSR	1,534	0.58%	0
The Earth Party Movement	MPT	955	0.36%	0
National Solidarity Party	PSN	938	0.36%	0
Valid votes		263,820	100.00%	10
Blank votes		2,483	0.92%	
Rejected votes – other		3,158	1.17%	
Total polled		269,461	67.89%	
Registered electors		396,918		

The following candidates were elected: Mira Amaral (PSD); Ana Benavente (PS); Rui Carreteiro (PS); Carlos Coelho (PSD); Jorge Lacão (PS); Luísa Mesquita (CDU); José Niza (PS); Miguel Relvas (PSD); Helena Santo (CDS-PP); and Silvino Sequeira (PS).

===== 1991 =====
Results of the 1991 legislative election held on 6 October 1991:

Party		Votes	%	Seats
Social Democratic Party	PSD	130,555	50.23%	6
Socialist Party	PS	78,232	30.10%	3
Unitary Democratic Coalition	CDU	25,922	9.97%	1
Social Democratic Centre Party	CDS	8,823	3.39%	0
National Solidarity Party	PSN	5,755	2.21%	0
Revolutionary Socialist Party	PSR	3,456	1.33%	0
Democratic Renewal Party	PRD	2,628	1.01%	0
Portuguese Workers' Communist Party	PCTP	2,286	0.88%	0
People's Monarchist Party	PPM	1,197	0.46%	0
Democratic Party of the Atlantic	PDA	1,051	0.40%	0
Valid votes		259,905	100.00%	10
Blank votes		2,955	1.11%	
Rejected votes – other		3,123	1.17%	
Total polled		265,983	68.48%	
Registered electors		388,409		

The following candidates were elected: Leonardo Ribeiro de Almeida (PSD); Mira Amaral (PSD); Carlos Coelho (PSD); Fernando Condesso (PSD); Alberto Costa (PS); Jorge Lacão (PS); Agostinho Lopes (CDU); Miguel Relvas (PSD); Gameiro dos Santos (PS); and Eduardo Pereira da Silva (PSD).

==== 1980s ====
===== 1987 =====
Results of the 1987 legislative election held on 19 July 1987:

Party		Votes	%	Seats
Social Democratic Party	PSD	127,788	49.14%	7
Socialist Party	PS	57,778	22.22%	3
Unitary Democratic Coalition	CDU	33,688	12.96%	1
Democratic Renewal Party	PRD	19,562	7.52%	1
Social Democratic Centre Party	CDS	9,674	3.72%	0
Popular Democratic Union	UDP	2,617	1.01%	0
Christian Democratic Party	PDC	2,120	0.82%	0
Revolutionary Socialist Party	PSR	2,083	0.80%	0
Communist Party (Reconstructed)	PC(R)	1,272	0.49%	0
Portuguese Democratic Movement	MDP	1,229	0.47%	0
People's Monarchist Party	PPM	1,198	0.46%	0
Portuguese Workers' Communist Party	PCTP	1,015	0.39%	0
Valid votes		260,024	100.00%	12
Blank votes		3,166	1.19%	
Rejected votes – other		3,572	1.34%	
Total polled		266,762	72.59%	
Registered electors		367,484		

The following candidates were elected: Mário Albuquerque (PSD); Mira Amaral (PSD); Raimundo Cabral (CDU); Fernando Condesso (PSD); Jorge Lacão (PS); Carlos Macedo (PSD); Hermínio Martinho (PRD); José Coelho dos Reis (PSD); Miguel Relvas (PSD); Jorge Sampaio (PS); Gameiro dos Santos (PS); and Mário Santos (PSD).

===== 1985 =====
Results of the 1985 legislative election held on 6 October 1985:

Party		Votes	%	Seats
Social Democratic Party	PSD	77,118	28.40%	4
Democratic Renewal Party	PRD	66,099	24.35%	3
Socialist Party	PS	51,459	18.95%	2
United People Alliance	APU	45,468	16.75%	2
Social Democratic Centre Party	CDS	21,369	7.87%	1
Popular Democratic Union	UDP	3,091	1.14%	0
Revolutionary Socialist Party	PSR	2,357	0.87%	0
Christian Democratic Party	PDC	1,724	0.63%	0
Communist Party (Reconstructed)	PC(R)	1,087	0.40%	0
Portuguese Workers' Communist Party	PCTP	922	0.34%	0
Workers' Party of Socialist Unity	POUS	813	0.30%	0
Valid votes		271,507	100.00%	12
Blank votes		2,477	0.89%	
Rejected votes – other		3,477	1.25%	
Total polled		277,461	75.89%	
Registered electors		365,602		

The following candidates were elected: Pedro Albuquerque (PS); Álvaro Brasileiro (APU); Paulo Campos (PRD); Fernando Condesso (PSD); Henrique Cruz (CDS); Cardoso e Cunha (PSD); Francisco Fernandes (PRD); Jorge Lacão (PS); Dias Lourenço (APU); Hermínio Martinho (PRD); Abílio Rodrigues (PSD); and Mário Santos (PSD).

===== 1983 =====
Results of the 1983 legislative election held on 25 April 1983:

Party		Votes	%	Seats
Socialist Party	PS	104,824	39.61%	5
Social Democratic Party	PSD	67,238	25.41%	3
United People Alliance	APU	54,473	20.58%	3
Social Democratic Centre Party	CDS	27,312	10.32%	1
Popular Democratic Union	UDP	2,677	1.01%	0
Christian Democratic Party	PDC	1,686	0.64%	0
Portuguese Workers' Communist Party	PCTP	1,420	0.54%	0
People's Monarchist Party	PPM	1,370	0.52%	0
Revolutionary Socialist Party	PSR	1,303	0.49%	0
Workers' Party of Socialist Unity	POUS	1,157	0.44%	0
Portuguese Marxist–Leninist Communist Organization	OCMLP	592	0.22%	0
Socialist Workers League	LST	592	0.22%	0
Valid votes		264,644	100.00%	12
Blank votes		2,360	0.87%	
Rejected votes – other		5,805	2.13%	
Total polled		272,809	78.17%	
Registered electors		349,010		

The following candidates were elected: Leonardo Ribeiro de Almeida (PSD); Álvaro Brasileiro (APU); Raimundo Cabral (APU); Fernando Condesso (PSD); Henrique Cruz (CDS); José Frazão (PS); Furtado Fernandes (PS); Jorge Lacão (PS); Dias Lourenço (APU); José Niza (PS); Abílio Rodrigues (PSD); and Silvino Sequeira (PS).

===== 1980 =====
Results of the 1980 legislative election held on 5 October 1980:

Party		Votes	%	Seats
Democratic Alliance	AD	122,261	43.12%	6
Republican and Socialist Front	FRS	88,389	31.17%	4
United People Alliance	APU	55,248	19.49%	2
Workers' Party of Socialist Unity	POUS	3,970	1.40%	0
Popular Democratic Union	UDP	3,482	1.23%	0
Labour Party	PT	3,294	1.16%	0
Revolutionary Socialist Party	PSR	2,888	1.02%	0
Christian Democratic Party, Independent Movement for the National Reconstruction / Party of the Portuguese Right and National Front	PDC- MIRN/ PDP- FN	2,069	0.73%	0
Portuguese Workers' Communist Party	PCTP	1,938	0.68%	0
Valid votes		283,539	100.00%	12
Blank votes		1,775	0.61%	
Rejected votes – other		5,088	1.75%	
Total polled		290,402	84.84%	
Registered electors		342,279		

The following candidates were elected: Leonardo Ribeiro de Almeida (AD); José Augusto Baptista (AD); Raimundo Cabral (APU); António Martins Canaverde (AD); Fernando Condesso (AD); Henrique Cruz (AD); Dias Lourenço (APU); Fausto Marques (FRS); Magalhães Mota (FRS); José Niza (FRS); Sanches Osório (AD); and António Reis (FRS).

==== 1970s ====
===== 1979 =====
Results of the 1979 legislative election held on 2 December 1979:

Party		Votes	%	Seats
Democratic Alliance	AD	118,494	42.33%	6
Socialist Party	PS	78,893	28.18%	3
United People Alliance	APU	62,713	22.40%	3
Popular Democratic Union	UDP	6,280	2.24%	0
Christian Democratic Party	PDC	3,995	1.43%	0
Revolutionary Socialist Party	PSR	2,945	1.05%	0
Portuguese Workers' Communist Party	PCTP	2,651	0.95%	0
Left-wing Union for the Socialist Democracy	UEDS	2,213	0.79%	0
Workers' Party of Socialist Unity	POUS	1,735	0.62%	0
Valid votes		279,919	100.00%	12
Blank votes		2,430	0.84%	
Rejected votes – other		6,388	2.21%	
Total polled		288,737	86.13%	
Registered electors		335,231		

The following candidates were elected: Leonardo Ribeiro de Almeida (AD); Augusto Ferreira do Amaral (AD); Álvaro Brasileiro (APU); Henrique Cruz (AD); Manuel Ferreira Lima (PS); Dias Lourenço (APU); Nuno Maria Matos (AD); Baeta Neves (AD); José Niza (PS); António Reis (PS); Vítor Louro Sá (APU); and José Cochofel Silva (AD).

===== 1976 =====
Results of the 1976 legislative election held on 25 April 1976:

Party		Votes	%	Seats
Socialist Party	PS	104,422	40.64%	6
Democratic People's Party	PPD	53,138	20.68%	3
Portuguese Communist Party	PCP	43,841	17.06%	2
Social Democratic Centre Party	CDS	37,699	14.67%	2
Popular Democratic Union	UDP	4,533	1.76%	0
People's Socialist Front	FSP	3,040	1.18%	0
Re-Organized Movement of the Party of the Proletariat	MRPP	1,906	0.74%	0
People's Monarchist Party	PPM	1,699	0.66%	0
Christian Democratic Party	PDC	1,690	0.66%	0
Movement of Socialist Left	MES	1,534	0.60%	0
Internationalist Communist League	LCI	1,312	0.51%	0
Worker–Peasant Alliance	AOC	1,189	0.46%	0
Communist Party of Portugal (Marxist–Leninist)	PCP(ML)	962	0.37%	0
Valid votes		256,965	100.00%	13
Rejected votes		14,937	5.49%	
Total polled		271,902	83.62%	
Registered electors		325,169		

The following candidates were elected: José Monteiro Andrade (PPD); Maria Barroso (PS); António Martins Canaverde (CDS); Manuel Dias (PS); Furtado Fernandes (PPD); José Parente Godinho (PS); Manuel Ferreira Lima (PS); Joaquim Lourenço (PPD); José Niza (PS); Octávio Pato (PCP); António Reis (PS); Vítor Louro Sá (PCP); and José Cunha Simões (CDS).
