= Miguel Poiares Maduro =

Portuguese academic and politician

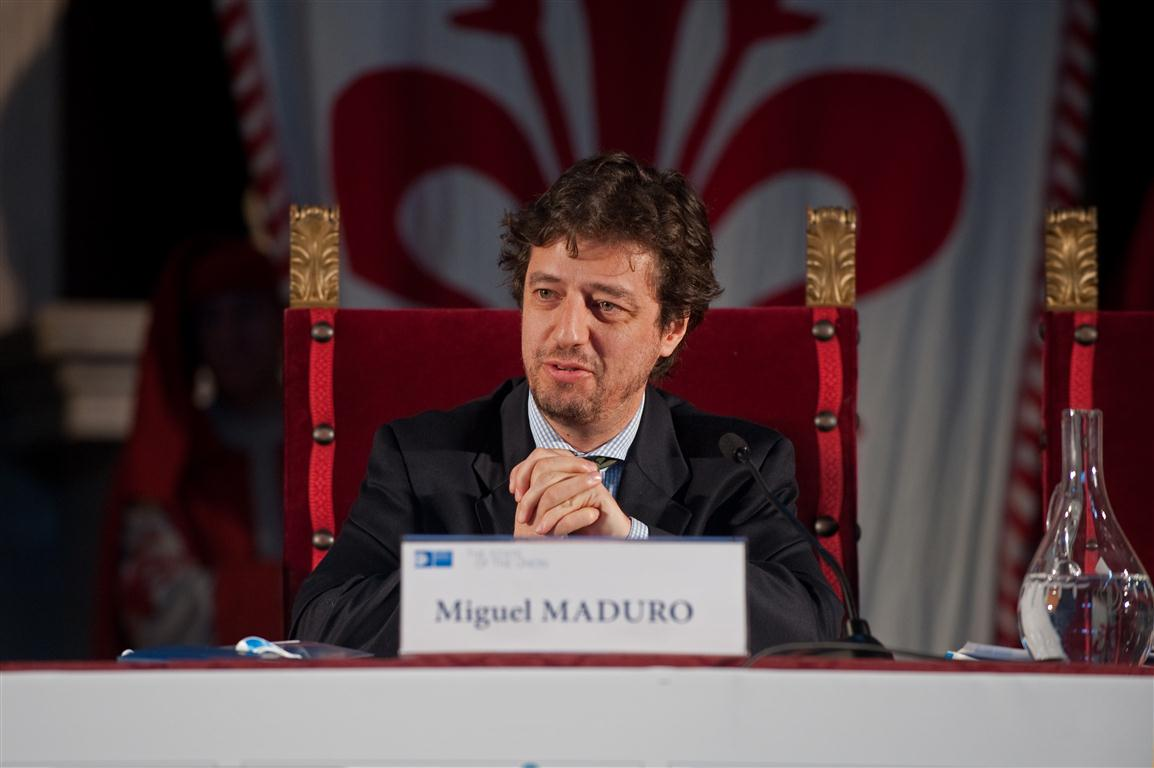
- Poiares Maduro in 2013

Minister Adjunct and for Regional Development
- In office 13 April 2013 – 30 October 2015
- Prime Minister: Pedro Passos Coelho
- Preceded by: Miguel Relvas
- Succeeded by: Luís Marques Guedes

Advocate General of the European Court of Justice
- In office 7 October 2003 – 6 October 2009

Personal details
- Born: Luís Miguel Poiares Pessoa Maduro; 3 January 1967 (age 59) Coimbra, Portugal
- Party: Social Democratic Party (2009–present)
- Education: University of Lisbon; European University Institute
- Occupation: Lawyer • Politician

Luís Miguel Poiares Pessoa Maduro (born 3 January 1967) is a Portuguese academic and politician. He was the Portuguese Minister for Regional Development from April 2013 to October 2015 in the XIX Constitutional Government of Portugal, led by Pedro Passos Coelho. Previously, he was director of the School of Transnational Governance and professor of law at the European University Institute in Florence, Italy. Poiares Maduro was also visiting professor at the faculty of law at Yale University in the United States of America.

== Career ==
Poiares Maduro was an Advocate General at the European Court of Justice in Luxembourg from 7 October 2003 to 6 October 2009.

He has been a Fulbright Visiting Research Scholar of Law at Harvard University, He is Doctor in law at the European University Institute and won the Purpose Prize Europe for the best PhD thesis at the institute that year.

He has worked as a lecturer at numerous institutions, including: College of Europe, Catholic University of Lisbon, the New University of Lisbon, School of Economics London, School of Chicago Law School, Centre for Political and Constitutional Studies in Spain, Instituto Ortega y Gasset in Madrid and Institute of European Studies of Macau.

Maduro belonged to the Political Committee of candidate Aníbal Cavaco Silva in the 2011 presidential elections.

Between 2012 and 2013, Poiares Maduro served as member of the European Commission’s High Level Group on Media Freedom and Pluralism, an advisory panel set up by European Commissioner Neelie Kroes and chaired by Vaira Vīķe-Freiberga.

From 13 April 2013 to 30 October 2015, Maduro was Minister for Regional Development in the centre-right Portuguese government of Pedro Passos Coelho.

In 2016, Poiraes Maduro was elected as chairman of the FIFA Governance Committee and its independent Review Committee; his co-chairman is Mukul Mudgal.

== Recognition ==
In 2010 Poiraes Maduro was awarded the Gulbenkian Prize for science. He was made a Commander of the Order of St. James of the Sword by the president of the Portuguese Republic for literary, scientific and artistic merit in 2006 and was the first recipient of the Rowe and Maw Prize at the European University Institute.

== Bibliography ==
- We the Court – The European Court of Justice and the European Economic Constitution
- The Plural Constitution – Constitutionalism and the European Union
- (with L Azoulai) The Past and Future of EU law - The Classics of EU law revisited on the 50th Anniversary of the Rome Treaty (2010)

== List of case opinions ==
- Commission v Netherlands (2006) C‑282/04 (opinion that golden shares in KPN NV and TPG NV contravened free movement of capital: adopted)
- Ahokainen and Leppik (2006) C-434/04
- FENIN v Commission (2006) C-205/03 P
- Del Cerro Alonso v Osakidetza-Servicio Vasco de Salud (2007) C-307/05 (opinion against fixed term workers being able to claim equal pay: rejected by ECJ)
- The Rosella or ITWF v Viking Line ABP (2007) C-438/05 (opinion against the trade union's right to strike: adopted)
- Coleman v Attridge Law (2008) C-303/06 (opinion in favour of a right to claim discrimination, associated to disabled child: adopted)
- Cartesio Oktató és Szolgáltató bt (2008) C-210/06 (opinion in favour of corporations being able to shift member states to evade social regulation: rejected)
- CGKR v Firma Feryn NV (2008) C-54/07 (opinion in favour of public statement that a business would not hire Moroccan immigrants was direct discrimination: adopted)
- Kadi and Al Barakaat International Foundation v Council and Commission (2008) C-402 (opinion in favour of EU law principles overriding a UN Security Council resolution: adopted)
