= Ministry of Parliamentary Affairs (Portugal) =

Government ministry of Portugal

- Ministério dos Assuntos Parlamentares
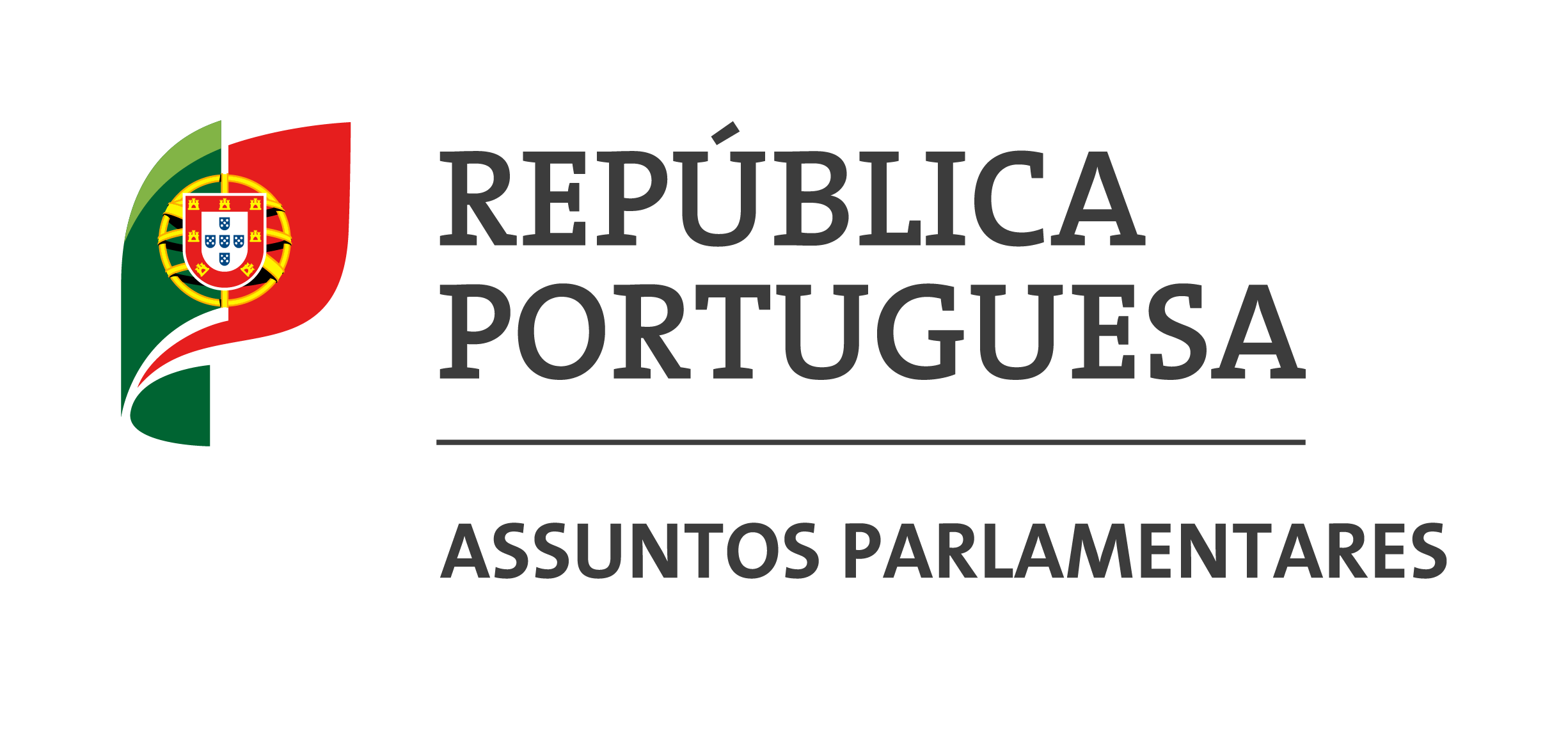

Ministry overview
- Formed: 1981
- Jurisdiction: Government of Portugal
- Headquarters: Lisbon
- Minister responsible: Carlos Abreu Amorim, Minister of Parliamentary Affairs

The Ministry of Parliamentary Affairs is the member of the Government of Portugal responsible for its relations with the Assembly of the Republic and other parliamentary groups.

== List of Ministers ==
Colour key
(for political parties)
Socialist Party (PS)
Social Democratic Party (PSD)

| # | Portrait | Name | Took office | Left office | Party | Prime Minister |
|---|---|---|---|---|---|---|
| 1 | | Fernando Amaral (1925–2009) | 4 September 1981 | 12 June 1982 | PSD | Francisco Pinto Balsemão |
| 2 | | Marcelo Rebelo de Sousa (b. 1948) | 12 June 1982 | 9 June 1983 | PSD | Francisco Pinto Balsemão |
| 3 | | António de Almeida Santos (1926–2016) | 9 June 1983 | 6 November 1985 | PS | Mário Soares |
| 4 | | Fernando Nogueira (b. 1950) | 6 November 1985 | 17 August 1987 | PSD | Aníbal Cavaco Silva |
| 5 | | António Capucho (b. 1945) | 17 August 1987 | 24 July 1989 | PSD | Aníbal Cavaco Silva |
| 6 | | Manuel Dias Loureiro (b. 1951) | 24 July 1989 | 31 October 1991 | PSD | Aníbal Cavaco Silva |
| 7 | | António Couto dos Santos (1949–2025) | 31 October 1991 | 19 March 1992 | PSD | Aníbal Cavaco Silva |
| – | Vacant office As Secretary of State: Luís Filipe Menezes (1992–1995); António Costa (1995–1997) | | 19 March 1992 | 25 November 1997 | | Aníbal Cavaco Silva |
| – | Vacant office As Secretary of State: Luís Filipe Menezes (1992–1995); António Costa (1995–1997) | | 19 March 1992 | 25 November 1997 | | António Guterres |
| 8 | | António Costa (b. 1961) | 25 November 1997 | 25 October 1999 | PS | António Guterres |
| – | Vacant office As Secretary of State: Fausto Correia (1999–2000); José Magalhães (2000–2002) | | 25 October 1999 | 6 April 2002 | | António Guterres |
| 9 | | Luís Marques Mendes (b. 1957) | 6 April 2002 | 17 July 2004 | PSD | José Durão Barroso |
| 10 | | Rui Gomes da Silva (b. 1958) | 17 July 2004 | 24 November 2004 | PSD | Pedro Santana Lopes |
| – | Vacant office As Secretary of State: António Montalvão Machado (2004–2005) | | 24 November 2004 | 12 March 2005 | | Pedro Santana Lopes |
| 11 | | Augusto Santos Silva (b. 1956) | 12 March 2005 | 26 October 2009 | PS | José Sócrates |
| 12 | | Jorge Lacão (b. 1954) | 26 October 2009 | 21 June 2011 | PS | José Sócrates |
| 13 | | Miguel Relvas (b. 1961) | 21 June 2011 | 13 April 2013 | PSD | Pedro Passos Coelho |
| 14 | | Luís Marques Guedes (b. 1957) | 13 April 2013 | 30 October 2015 | PSD | Pedro Passos Coelho |
| 15 | | Carlos Costa Neves (b. 1954) | 30 October 2015 | 26 November 2015 | PSD | Pedro Passos Coelho |
| – | Vacant office As Secretary of State: Pedro Nuno Santos (2015–2019); Duarte Cordeiro (2019–2022) | | 26 November 2015 | 30 March 2022 | | António Costa |
| 16 | | Ana Catarina Mendes (b. 1973) | 30 March 2022 | 2 April 2024 | PS | António Costa |
| 17 | | Pedro Duarte (b. 1973) | 2 April 2024 | 5 July 2025 | PSD | Luís Montenegro |
| 18 | | Carlos Abreu Amorim (b. 1963) | 5 July 2025 | present | PSD | Luís Montenegro |
