= Jorge Nuno de Sá =

Portuguese politician

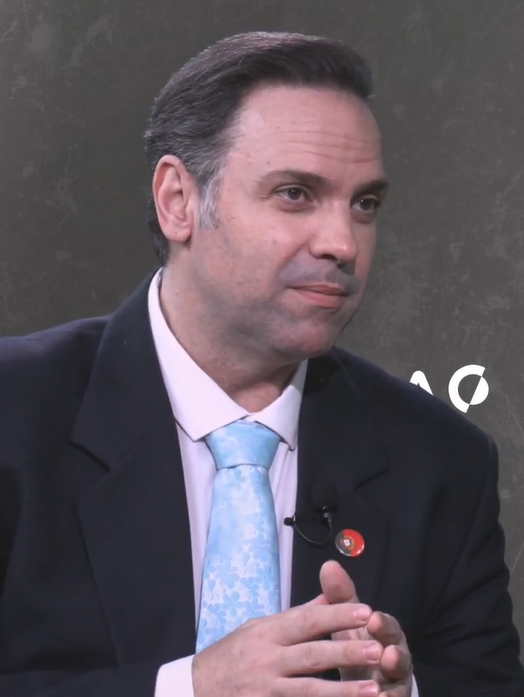
- Jorge Nuno de Sá in 2024.

President of Alliance
- In office 31 October 2021 – 4 March 2025
- Preceded by: Paulo Bento
- Succeeded by: Party dissolved

President of the Social Democratic Youth
- In office 29 September 2002 – 20 March 2005
- Preceded by: Pedro Duarte
- Succeeded by: Daniel Fangueiro

Member of the Assembly of the Republic
- In office 5 April 2002 – 9 March 2005
- Constituency: Viana do Castelo

Personal details
- Born: Jorge Nuno Fernandes Traila Monteiro de Sá; 13 June 1977 (age 49)
- Party: Alliance
- Other political affiliations: Social Democratic (formerly)
- Occupation: Politician

Jorge Nuno Fernandes Traila Monteiro de Sá (born 13 June 1975) is a Portuguese politician who was the President of Alliance from 2021 to 2025.

== Biography ==
Jorge Nuno de Sá was a member of the Social Democratic Party, having served as a member of the Assembly of the Republic from Viana do Castelo from 2002 to 2005. He was also the leader of the Social Democratic Youth from 29 September 2002 to March 2005.

In November 2010, he was the only member of the council of the PSD to vote against the candidacy of incumbent President Cavaco Silva in the 2011 presidential election. In February 2011 he married a man, in what was the first same-sex marriage of a Portuguese politician.

After leaving the Social Democratic Party following disagreements with Pedro Passos Coelho, at the time the leader of the PSD, Sá joined Alliance, a party created by former Prime minister Pedro Santana Lopes. Following the 2019 election, when Alliance failed to elect any seats in the Assembly of the Republic, Santana Lopes left the party, leaving Paulo Bento as its leader. Nuno de Sá ran for the leadership in October 2021, becoming the third President of Alliance.

In the 2021 local elections, Jorge Nuno de Sá was a candidate for the municipal assembly of Lisbon, running under the New Times coalition of Carlos Moedas, being elected. He was reelected in 2025, as an independent under the PSD/CDS/IL coalition.
