= Vitalino Canas =

Portuguese lawyer, professor and politician

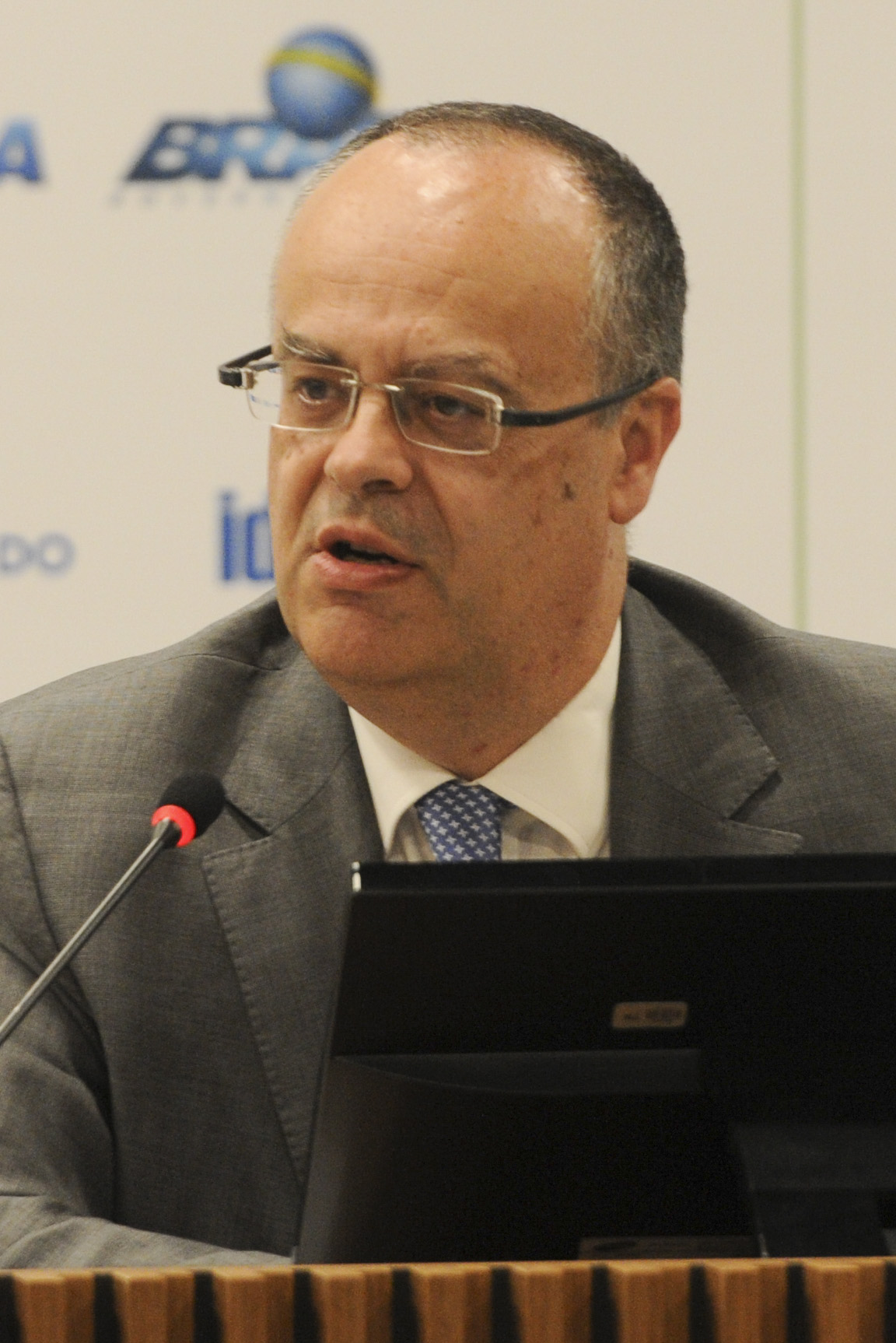

Member of the Assembly of the Republic
- In office 15 October 2009 – 25 October 2019
- Constituency: Lisbon
- In office 5 April 2002 – 14 October 2009
- Constituency: Santarém

Personal details
- Born: Vitalino José Ferreira Prova Canas; 14 July 1959 (age 67) Caldas da Rainha, Leiria District, Portugal
- Party: Socialist Party
- Education: University of Lisbon
- Occupation: Politician
- Profession: professor, lawyer

Vitalino José Ferreira Prova Canas (born 14 July 1959, in Caldas da Rainha) is a Portuguese lawyer, professor and politician, member of the Socialist Party.

== Career ==
Graduated and having received a master's degree of law from the University of Lisbon, he began his teaching career in 1986, having taught at the Law Faculties of the University of Lisbon, University of Macau and at the Eduardo Mondlane University, as well as at the Higher Institute of Management Sciences and the Higher Institute of Sciences Police and Homeland Security. Still a student, he joined the youth wing and, later, the Socialist Party, having presided over the National Commission of Jurisdiction in the two structures. From 1983 to 1984 he served as an advisor to the Judicial Office of the Constitutional Court, which he would resume between 1993 and 1995. He headed the Governor of Macau's office between 1989 and 1991 and in Mozambique he was a legal advisor to the World Bank in 1991 and to the Government from 1992 to 1995. Between 1995 and 2002 he was Secretary of State for the Presidency of the Council of Ministers, under the government of António Guterres. Since 2002, he has been a deputy in the Sintra Municipal Assembly and the Assembly of the Republic, having been a national spokesperson for the PS between 2005 and 2009. Aside from politics, he is a lawyer in Lisbon, a legal advisor to the Fundação Oriente and the Stanley Ho Foundation and, since 2004, of the Cape Verdean Government. He has been a non-executive director of the Companhia de Seguros Sagres since 2006.
