= Mara Lagriminha =

Portuguese politician

Deputy in the Portuguese Assembly of the Republic
- Incumbent
- Assumed office 2019
- Constituency: Santarém

Personal details
- Born: 16 June 1985 (age 41) Coruche, Santarém District, Portugal
- Party: Portuguese: Socialist Party (PS)
- Education: University of Coimbra
- Occupation: Politician

Mara Lagriminha (born 1985) is a Portuguese politician who was trained in law. As a member of the Portuguese Socialist Party (PS), she was elected as a deputy in the Portuguese Assembly of the Republic in 2019, representing Santarém and was re-elected in January 2022.

== Early life and education ==
Mara Lúcia Lagriminha Coelho was born on 16 June 1985. She comes from the municipality of Coruche in the Santarém District of Portugal, where she still resides. She has a degree in law from the Faculty of Law of the University of Coimbra. She has worked as an advisor to the president of the Coruche municipality.

== Political life ==
Lagriminha became a member of Socialist Youth, the youth wing of the Socialist Party, in 2001 and became its president in Coruche. She also became president of the Socialist Women of Santarém. Elected at the age of 32, she is the youngest woman to hold such a position in Portugal. She became a member of the municipal assembly of Coruche in 2005 and later the leader of the PS in the assembly and the mayor of Coruche.

In 2019, Lagriminha was elected to become a deputy in the National Assembly, as a member of the PS list for Santarém. In the Assembly, she served on the Culture and Communication committee. She was re-elected in the January 2022 national election, being fourth on the PS list of candidates for the district and being elected when the party won five seats in Santarém and also a majority of seats nationally, enabling it to form a government without a coalition.
