= Carlos Abreu Amorim =

Portuguese politician (born 1963)

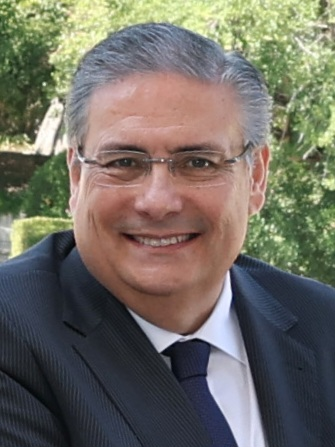
- Amorim in 2025

Minister of Parliamentary Affairs
- Incumbent
- Assumed office 5 June 2025
- Prime Minister: Luís Montenegro
- Preceded by: Pedro Duarte

Secretary of State of Parliamentary Affairs
- In office 4 April 2024 – 5 June 2025
- Prime Minister: Luís Montenegro
- Minister: Pedro Duarte

Member of the Assembly of the Republic for Viana do Castelo
- In office 20 June 2011 – 24 October 2019

Personal details
- Born: Carlos Eduardo Almeida de Abreu Amorim; 1 October 1963 (age 63)
- Party: Social Democratic Party
- Occupation: Lawyer • Professor • Politician

Carlos Eduardo Almeida de Abreu Amorim (born 1 October 1963) is a Portuguese politician who has served as Minister of Parliamentary Affairs since 5 June 2025. He was previously Secretary of State for Parliamentary Affairs from 2024 to 2025. From 2011 to 2019, he was a member of the Assembly of the Republic.

== Career ==
=== Early political career ===
Abreu Amorim's political activity predates his election to parliament in 2011. According to the magazine Sábado, in his youth he joined the Independent Movement for the National Reconstruction (MIRN), a right-wing party led by General Kaúlza de Arriaga, registered with the Supreme Court of Justice in 1979, which advocated the establishment of a presidential system. It was there that he met Diogo Pacheco de Amorim, one of the founders of the MIRN's Porto branch and one of the main organisers of the party's youth groups in secondary schools and universities, with whom he would follow a parallel political path over the following decades.

Both men later joined the CDS-PP: Abreu Amorim held internal positions in the party's Porto district structure, while Pacheco de Amorim served as parliamentary chief of staff during Manuel Monteiro's leadership. The two were subsequently among the founders of the New Democracy Party (PND), created by Monteiro after he left the CDS-PP, whose founding congress took place in November 2003 in Vila Nova de Famalicão.

=== Member of Parliament and government ===
Abreu Amorim was first elected to the Assembly of the Republic in the 2011 legislative election, heading the Social Democratic Party (PSD) list in the Viana do Castelo District, and was subsequently chosen as vice-president of the PSD parliamentary group. In 2013 he called for the resignation of Finance Minister Vítor Gaspar, drawing criticism from party vice-president Jorge Moreira da Silva.

In the 2015 legislative election he again headed the Portugal Ahead coalition list in Viana do Castelo and was re-elected. In 2019 he was left off the PSD's lists under the leadership of Rui Rio, after having supported Pedro Santana Lopes in the 2018 PSD leadership election, and returned to university teaching.

In 2024 he was appointed Secretary of State for Parliamentary Affairs by Prime Minister Luís Montenegro. Responsible for the media portfolio, he drew up a plan to end advertising on public broadcaster RTP, which was blocked by all the other parties in the Assembly of the Republic.

In June 2025 he succeeded Pedro Duarte as Minister of Parliamentary Affairs. He became responsible for the government's dialogue with the parliamentary groups in a legislature divided into three blocs, in which Chega became the second-largest group with 60 deputies, ahead of the Socialist Party with 58. According to Sábado, he was one of the government's main interlocutors in its agreements with Chega on immigration and taxation, meeting Chega's parliamentary leader Pedro Pinto and Rui Afonso, chair of the Budget and Finance Committee. The same magazine noted that Abreu Amorim had a reputation for aggressive language, recalling that he had once called André Ventura a "bully boy" on Facebook.

== Electoral results ==
=== Vila Nova de Gaia City Council election, 2013 ===
Ballot: 29 September 2013
Party	Candidate	Votes	%	Seats	+/−
PS	Eduardo Vítor Rodrigues	53,146	38.2	5	+2
PSD/CDS–PP	Carlos Abreu Amorim	27,813	20.0	3	–5
Ind.	José Guilherme Aguiar	27,494	19.7	3	new
CDU	Jorge Sarabando	8,846	6.4	0	±0
BE	António Santos Pereira	4,266	3.1	0	±0
Ind.	Manuel Vieira Machado	2,303	1.7	0	new
PCTP/MRPP	Cristina Máximo	2,087	1.5	0	±0
PTP	Manuel Almeida	1,173	0.8	0	new
Blank/Invalid ballots		12,142	8.7	–	–
Turnout		139,300	53.36	11	±0
Source: Autárquicas 2013
