= Centrum voor Gelijkheid van Kansen en voor Racismebestrijding v Firma Feryn NV =

CGKR v Firma Feryn NV
- Court: European Court of Justice
- Citation: (2008) C-54/07, [2008] ICR 1390

Case opinions
- AG Maduro

Keywords
- Free movement of goods

Centrum voor Gelijkheid van Kansen en voor Racismebestrijding v Firma Feryn NV (2008) C-54/07 is an EU law case, concerning the free movement of goods in the European Union.

== Facts ==
Mr Pascal Feryn, one of the directors of a door installation company called Firma Feryn NV, said it would not employ immigrants from Morocco in customers' houses, because allegedly his customers were opposed. In an interview he said 'people often say: ‘no immigrants’.... I must comply with my customers’ requirements.’ The CGKR (Centre for equal opportunities and opposition to racism) contended that this policy was a breach of the Racial Equality Directive 2000/43/EC, as it constituted direct discrimination.

The President of the Arbeidsrechtbank Brussels held that the public statements did not count as discrimination. They were merely evidence of potential discrimination. The CGKR did not show that anyone was ever actually turned down.

== Judgment ==
=== Advocate General Opinion ===
Advocate General Maduro advised that it was direct discrimination.

17. It would lead to awkward results if discrimination of this type were for some reason to be excluded altogether from the scope of the Directive, because by implication Member States would be permitted, under the Directive, to allow employers to differentiate very effectively between candidates on grounds of racial or ethnic origin, simply by publicising the discriminatory character of their recruitment policy as overtly as possible beforehand. Thus, the most blatant strategy of employment discrimination might also turn out to be the most 'rewarding'. That would clearly undermine rather than promote conditions for a socially inclusive labour market. In short, it would defeat the very purpose of the Directive if public statements made by an employer in the context of a recruitment drive, to the effect that applications from persons of a certain ethnic origin would be turned down, were held to fall outside the concept of direct discrimination.

18. The contention made by Mr Feryn that customers would be unfavourably disposed towards employees of a certain ethnic origin is wholly irrelevant to the question whether the Directive applies. Even if that contention were true, it would only illustrate that 'markets will not cure discrimination' and that regulatory intervention is essential. Moreover, the adoption of regulatory measures at Community level helps to solve a collective action problem for employers by preventing the distortion of competition that precisely because of that market failure could arise if different standards of protection against discrimination existed at national level.

19. I therefore suggest that the Court give the following answer to the first and second questions referred by the national court: a public statement made by an employer in the context of a recruitment drive, to the effect that applications from persons of a certain ethnic origin will be turned down, constitutes direct discrimination within the meaning of Article 2(2)(a) of the Directive.

[...]

25. I accordingly propose that the Court give the following answer to the third, fourth and fifth questions referred by the national court: once a prima facie case of discrimination based on racial or ethnic origin has been established, it is for the respondent to prove that the principle of equal treatment has not been infringed.

[...]

28. It is for the referring court to determine, in accordance with the relevant rules of domestic law, which remedy would be appropriate in the circumstances of the present case. However, in the main, purely token sanctions are not sufficiently dissuasive to enforce the prohibition of discrimination. Therefore, it would seem that a court order prohibiting such behaviour would constitute a more appropriate remedy.

=== Court of Justice ===
The European Court of Justice held that an advertisement would dissuade applicants for employment and constituted direct discrimination. It was unnecessary to show there was actually a dissuasive effect, but the company was entitled to bring evidence to show its practices were not discriminatory.

22. It is true that, as those two Member States contend, Article 2(2) of Directive 2000/43 defines direct discrimination as a situation in which one person 'is treated' less favourably than another is, has been or would be treated in a comparable situation on grounds of racial or ethnic origin. Likewise, Article 7 of that directive requires Member States to ensure that judicial procedures are available to 'all persons who consider themselves wronged by failure to apply the principle of equal treatment to them' and to public interest bodies bringing judicial proceedings 'on behalf or in support of the complainant'.

23. Nevertheless, it cannot be inferred from this that the lack of an identifiable complainant leads to the conclusion that there is no direct discrimination within the meaning of Directive 2000/43. The aim of that directive, as stated in recital 8 of its preamble, is 'to foster conditions for a socially inclusive labour market'. For that purpose, Article 3(1)(a) states that the directive covers, inter alia, selection criteria and recruitment conditions.

24. The objective of fostering conditions for a socially inclusive labour market would be hard to achieve if the scope of Directive 2000/43 were to be limited to only those cases in which an unsuccessful candidate for a post, considering himself to be the victim of direct discrimination, brought legal proceedings against the employer.

25. The fact that an employer declares publicly that it will not recruit employees of a certain ethnic or racial origin, something which is clearly likely to strongly dissuade certain candidates from submitting their candidature and, accordingly, to hinder their access to the labour market, constitutes direct discrimination in respect of recruitment within the meaning of Directive 2000/43. The existence of such direct discrimination is not dependent on the identification of a complainant who claims to have been the victim.

[...]

31. Statements by which an employer publicly lets it be known that, under its recruitment policy, it will not recruit any employees of a certain ethnic or racial origin may constitute facts of such a nature as to give rise to a presumption of a discriminatory recruitment policy.

32. It is, thus, for that employer to adduce evidence that it has not breached the principle of equal treatment, which it can do, inter alia, by showing that the actual recruitment practice of the undertaking does not correspond to those statements.

33. It is for the national court to verify that the facts alleged against that employer are established and to assess the sufficiency of the evidence which the employer adduces in support of its contentions that it has not breached the principle of equal treatment.

== See also ==
- European Union law
