= Armando Marques Guedes =

Portuguese academic (born 1952)

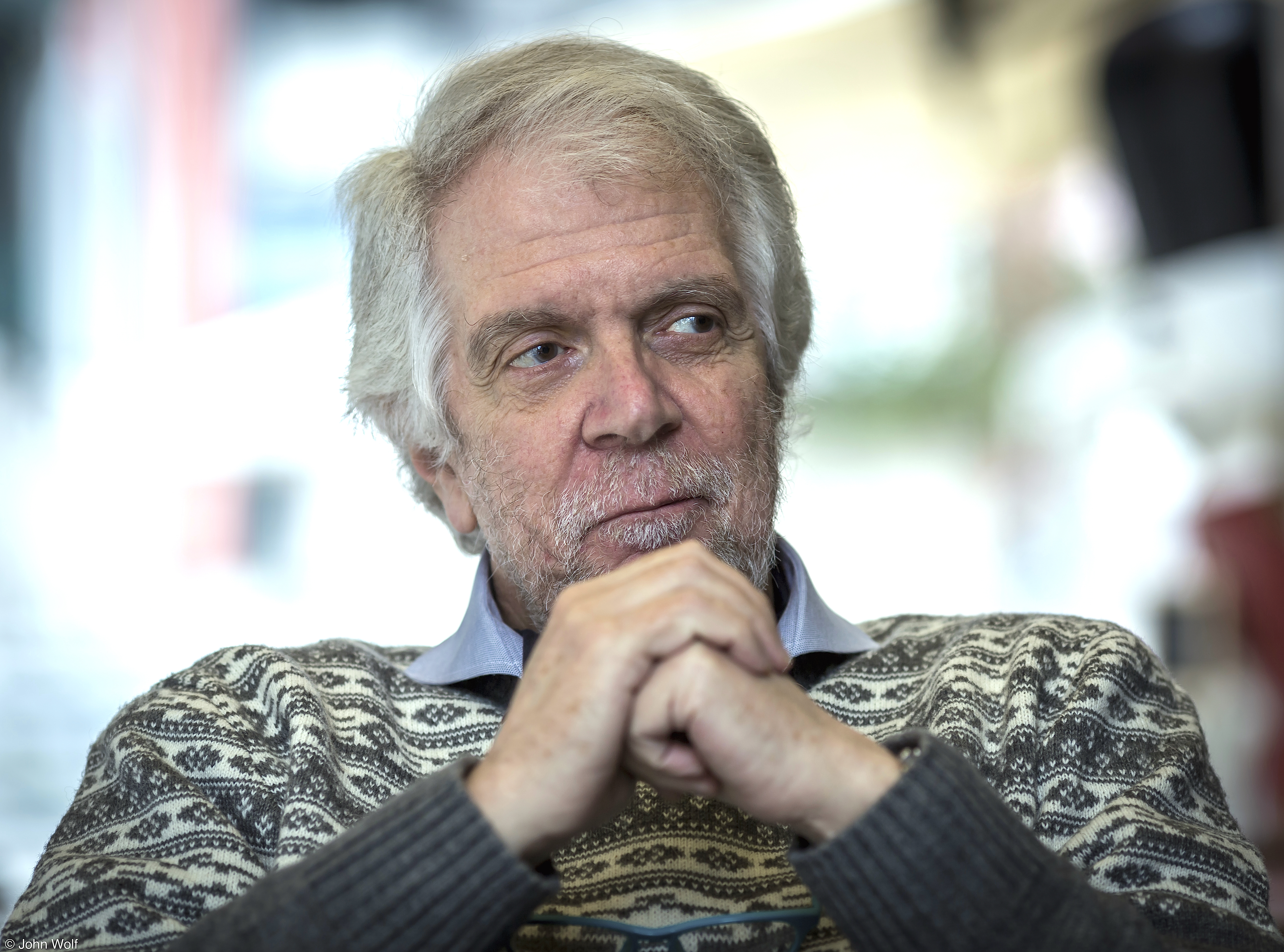
- Marques Guedes in 2015
- Born: 9 September 1952 (age 73); Lisbon, Portugal
- Scientific career
- Fields: International relations Political science
- Institutions: NOVA School of Law

Armando Manuel de Barros Serra Marques Guedes (born 9 September 1952 in Lisbon, Portugal) is a political scientist, anthropologist and a former diplomat with expertise in international relations, political science, theory and philosophy, diplomacy, security and defence, and geopolitics. He is a professor of political science, law, and international politics at the Universidade Nova de Lisboa, as well as the professor responsible for geopolitics at the Instituto Universitário Militar, Instituto de Estudos Superiores Militares (IUM – IESM, the Portuguese Joint Higher Command and Staff College).

== Early life and education ==
Marques Guedes was born in Lisbon, Portugal, the son of Clara (née Vaz Serra) and Armando Manuel Marques Guedes, a notable Portuguese Constitutional Law Professor who was the first President of the country's Constitutional Court. Born into a socially well-renowned family with strong academic roots, Marques Guedes was also first grandson to Armando Marques Guedes, a professor of economics and the last Minister of Finance of Portugal's (1910–1926) First Republic. One of his illustrious great-grandparents was José de Almeida e Silva, a famous painter as well as a professor at the Sociedade Nacional de Belas Artes, and one of the founders of the Instituto Etnológico da Beira. On his maternal side, this intellectual pattern is there too, with a lineage of academics with a Portuguese Sephardic Jewish background, that goes back for at least six generations since the mid-19th (his family having returned to Portugal in the first decade of that century, after almost three centuries in exile) up to late-20th century, his ascendants having mostly been trained at the Universidade de Coimbra.

Marques Guedes was primarily educated in an English school in Estoril, and then at Escola Salesiana, also in Estoril. When he was nine years old, he was sent to begin his secondary school in a French boarding school near Toulon, in southern France's L’Institution Saint Joseph – La Navarre, before returning to Portugal to conclude his high-school and pre-university training. For a year he dabbled in a specially selected twenty student national team of mathematics (entitled "Turmas experimentais de Matemáticas Modernas", a New Mathematics project spearheaded by José Sebastião e Silva) as he intended to become an astrophysicist and study at the Université de Louvain, in Belgium. However, he soon changed his mind and decided to read Humanities instead. He nevertheless maintained an unflinching passion for cosmological subjects, adding to it another one: Ordovician palaeontology, an area in which he occasionally engages in published peer reviewed academic work for over two decades.

Marques Guedes attended the Instituto Superior de Ciências Sociais e Políticas, University of Lisbon, where he obtained his first degree in 1975, in administration.

In 1976, he obtained a B.Sc. (Honours) in social anthropology from the London School of Economics and Political Science.

From London he moved to France, and two years later, in 1978, he received a Diplôme en Anthropologie Sociale from the École des Hautes Études en Sciences Sociales, the EHESS, in Paris, with a thesis on Thai, Malaysian, Laotian, Cambodian and Vietnamese hunter-gatherers entitled La Ceinture Indochinoise de Chasseurs-Cueilleurs. His dissertation was awarded a prize that allowed him to maintain himself after the four-year Calouste Gulbenkian Foundation scholarship he received to go to both London and Paris. The prize was proposed and voted on by French historian Fernand Braudel and French anthropologist Maurice Godelier and formally handed to Marques Guedes by British historian Eric Hobsbawm, and it allowed him to return to his London School of Economics (LSE) alma mater.

At the LSE, Marques Guedes studied under Julian Pitt-Rivers, James Woodburn and Maurice Bloch, the latter two as his academic advisers. His student colleagues at the LSE included noted South-African born David Lan, playwright, filmmaker, theatre director, now at the helm of London's Young Vic Theater and of the Word Trade Centre arts hub in New York, and also Charlotte Seymour-Smith, daughter of the famous poet and literary critic Martin Seymour-Smith.

At the EHESS, in Paris, he carried out research with Georges Condominas and Maurice Godelier. While in Paris, he regularly attended the Collége de France mid to late 1970s weekly seminars of Michel Foucault and Claude Lévi-Strauss. All these maîtres-penseurs, albeit they developed very different theoretical and methodological takes, were to exert a strong influence on Marques Guedes's theoretical leanings and preferences, the imprints of which are still clearly felt in his contemporary academic productions.

In July 1980, while pursuing PhD research in the Philippines, he was awarded a MPhil. in Social Anthropology by the London School of Economics. He was at the time carrying out two and a half years of participant observation field research among the Atta, hunter-gatherer groups roaming the thick primary tropical rain-forests of Kalinga-Apayao, a province in the northernmost mountainous reaches of the Philippine archipelago, in the northeasternmost ranges of Luzon's Cordillera Central. During his thirty two months there he collected detailed ethnographic data on the religious and political aspects of the social life of the hitherto unstudied Atta pygmy Negrito nomads. The title of his thesis was Rituais igualitários. Ritos dos caçadores e recolectores Atta de Kalinga-Apayao, Filipinas.

After a stint of over a decade in which he left academia for a diplomatic posting in Angola, as the first Cultural Counsellor to the Portuguese Embassy in Luanda, Marques Guedes returned to Portugal in 1990, fully re-entering academic life. In 1996 he was awarded by the Faculdade de Ciências Sociais e Humanas (FCSH), Universidade Nova de Lisboa a Portuguese PhD summa cum laude in Social and Cultural Anthropology. In this work he looked at the manifold links between religious ritual and politics in and among Atta nomadic camps.

After nine years as an auxiliary professor of, first, Social Anthropology and then, Theory and History of Ideas and finally, from 1995, International Relations and Political Science – all at the Faculdade de Ciências Sociais e Humanas of the Universidade Nova de Lisboa – in June 2003 he became an associate professor at the newly created Law Faculty, an organic unit of the same university. In May 2005, he obtained his Agregação in Law, from the Law School of Universidade Nova de Lisboa, and soon afterward gained full tenure.

== Career ==
=== Academic ===
Armando Marques Guedes has pursued a diversified career in anthropological, sociological and international, as well as national, political research and teaching. This included fieldwork in the Philippines, Cabo Verde, São Tomé e Príncipe, Angola, and East Timor.

Chronologically, he first obtained fellowships at Cambridge University and the University of Edinburgh, and later held a succession of faculty positions in anthropology, sociology, and political science (including political theory and international politics) at the Universidade Nova de Lisboa and at the Instituto de Estudos Superiores Militares (IUM – IESM). In 1994–1996, Marques Guedes was a co-founder, at the Faculdade Ciências Sociais e Humanas of Universidade Nova, of what is now known as the Departmento de Estudos Políticos; there, for four years, he served as president of its Pedagogical Council.

At the Nova School of Law, he introduced courses on Legal Anthropology and African Legal Systems, the first of their kind in Portugal. Marques Guedes has published a variety of books and articles on both of these topics.

Marques Guedes also innovated in other domains. At the Diplomatische Academie of Wien, in Austria, he published a monograph in 2008 that was effectively the first global analytical overview of diplomatic training. The volume was prefaced by Czech Jiří Gruša, a poet laureate who presided over PEN Club International, a Minister of Education in Prague after being one of the signers of Charter 77, then Prague's Ambassador to Vienna, and who finally served as the academy's its director between 2005 and 2009. Marques Guedes's monograph, titled Raising Diplomats. Political, genealogical and administrative constraints in training for diplomacy, was launched by Ambassador Gruša and Collége d'Europe Rector Paul Demaret at the College of Europe in Bruges.

As may be seen below from his publications, Marques Guedes’ attention to security and defence matters, as well as geopolitics, have since become a focal point of many of his writings and conferences. This is perhaps the area in which both his academic and institutional efforts have, of late, been more influential, in his country as well as abroad. Marques Guedes is a regular speaker in a variety of Portuguese and international venues, having given talks and organised courses in well over forty countries. The scope of his academic internationalisation is wide, and by mid-2017 he had some of his works translated into twelve languages and published in fifteen countries.

In 2011 he was made an honorary professor of the Department of History at the University of Bucharest, Romania.

=== Diplomatic ===
His professional diplomatic career has been closely followed, in terms of thematic focuses, by his intellectual and academic productions. In 1985, a couple of years upon his return from his intensive fieldwork in the Philippines, Marques Guedes was assigned as the first Cultural Attaché (later, in 1986, Cultural Counsellor) to the Portuguese Embassy in Luanda, Angola. He remained in his diplomatic post in then war-thorn Angola until December 1989. Following that, and up to 1996, he was placed at the Portuguese MFA as an advisor on African political and cultural affairs.

In 2005, he was appointed President of the Instituto Diplomático of the Portuguese Ministry of Foreign Affairs, and in 2006 was made Policy Planning Director for the Ministry, a function he kept for the following three years.

From 2009 to 2013, Marques Guedes was President of the General Assembly of the Portuguese Society of International Law (SPDI), a branch of the International Law Association (ILA). He also served as President of the Scientific Committee of the Instituto Português de Relações Internacionais e Segurança (IPRIS). He is a senior advisor for the Budapest-centred International Centre for Democratic Transition, Hungary.

A large set of similar positions, mostly in think tanks and research institutions, have been held by Marques Guedes since the beginning of the first decade of the present century. Their range is wide. For instance, from 2006 up to the present, Marques Guedes has been vice-president of the Board of the Movimento Europeu (Portugal). During the same period, he has also actively engaged in the design of the Portuguese Strategy for the Sea, in direct collaboration with the Directorate-General for Sea Policy of the national Ministry of Agriculture, Sea, Environment and Spatial Planning. From Portugal's entry into the European Union, in the mid-1980s, he has also been involved in a score of projects managed and/or financed by the Portuguese Fundação para a Ciência e Tecnologia, and by the European Union, at the level of the Ministry of Foreign Affairs, of that of National Defence, and at that of the Ministry of Education.

He worked as a consultant of both state and non-state entities in African countries such as Angola, Cabo Verde and S. Tomé e Príncipe, as well as European ones such as Slovenia, Serbia, Romania, Poland, Hungary, Georgia, Croatia, and the Czech Republic, and, in Asia, East Timor.

=== Publications ===
Marques Guedes has published seventeen books and well over one hundred and twenty articles on subjects as varied as international politics, security, diplomacy, social anthropology, and palaeontology. Marques Guedes' research works have always been strongly multidisciplinary in nature. There are, however, perceptible changes in their thematic and geographical focuses: from Southeast Asia in the 80s and 90s to Africa in the late 90s and ever since, and from diplomacy onto foreign policy. His work has increasingly been centred on security issues, namely Central and "East" European, Central Asian, and, mostly, from the late 90s up until now, South Atlantic development and maritime security issues. As was earlier the case with his academic publications, his writings, conferences, and consultancy work in these latter domains have gained a growing domestic and international recognition. The handful of his papers and books listed below reflect those evolving preferences and his changes in focus.

- 2016 – "Breves Reflexões sobre o Poder e o Ciberespaço", com Lino Santos, Revista de Direito e Segurança, no. 6, pp. 189–210, NOVA Law School/NOVA Direito, UNL, Lisboa.
- 2015 – "Liaisons dangereuses: reading and riding the winds of security risks in the Atlantic south", in Dan Hamilton (ed.). "Dark Network in the Atlantic Basin. Emerging Trends and Implications for Human Security" (PDF). Washington DC: Paul H. Nitze School of Advanced International Studies, Johns Hopkins University. pp. 205–237. Archived from the original (PDF) on 2015-03-05.
- 2014 – "Le Droit de Mer et les côtes et les rimlands de l’Europe du sud-ouest et de l’Afrique du nord-ouest: quelques insuffisances du cadre juridique face aux enjeux géopolitiques présents", in Revista de Direito e Segurança
- 2013 – "De novo o repertório político performativo e as águas revoltas do semi-presidencialismo Timorense – mas agora redux", in Rui Graça Feijó (org), O Semipresidencialismo Timorense: História, Politica e Desenho Institucional, Coimbra, Almedina/CES.
- 2012 – "Geopolitical shifts in the Wider Atlantic past, present and future", in (org.) John Richardson, The Fractured Ocean. Report on current changes on Maritime Policy in the Wider Atlantic: 11–59, German Marshall Fund of the United States, Washington DC, http://www.ocppc.ma/sites/default/files/FracturedOcean.pdf
- 2012 – '"From deregulation to recentering in the South Atlantic and the construction of ‘lusofonia", Janus.net, vol. 3 no.1: pp. 1–36, Universidade Autónoma de Lisboa, http://observare.ual.pt/janus.net/images/stories/PDF/vol3_n1/en/en_vol3_n1.pdf
- 2012 – "European Energy Security: The Geopolitics of Natural Gas Projects", in Ruxandra Ivan (org.), New Regionalism or No Regionalism? Emerging Regionalism in the Black Sea Area: pp. 69–94, with Radu Dudau, Ashgate, London.
- 2011 – "Clusters of Diplomatic Training in the Central European Initiative Countries against a Comparative Background", Centre for Advanced Academic Studies and Ministry of Foreign Affairs, Diplomatic Academy Proceedings, vol. 8, no. 1: 21–39, Dubrovnik and Zagreb, Croatia.
- 2010 – "Кавказский меловой круг: "укрепление России в южной части постсоветского пространства - эпохальное событие", in Russian [The Caucasian Chalk Circle: "The strengthening of Russia in the southern part of the post-Soviet space – a watershed event"], in Caucasus Times, with questions from Sergey Markedonov, 26 December 2010, in https://web.archive.org/web/20140903113056/http://www.caucasustimes.com/article.asp?id=20691, Prague and Moscow.
- 2010 – "La lusofonia nella partita del Sud-Atlantico", Limes 5-2010: 55–67, Rivista Italiana di Geopolitica, numero speciale, Il Portogallo è grande, Roma.
- 2010 – "Democracy and its Boundaries. Can there be such a thing as a bona fide intergenerational social contract?", Intergenerational Justice Review 1/2010: 31–22, The Foundation for the Rights of Future Generations (FRFG)/Stiftung für die Rechte zukünftiger Generationen (SRzG), Uberursel, Germany, https://docs.google.com/viewer?a=v&pid=gmail&attid=0.1&thid=12b2090f3debb65d&mt=application/pdf&url, Germany.
- 2010 – Controlos Remotos. Dimensões Externas da Segurança Interna em Portugal. The study has, as a co-author, Luís Elias, Instituto Superior de Ciências Policiais e Segurança Interna e Almedina, Lisboa e Coimbra.
- 2010 – "President and Prime Minister. Twinning up and switching down", Magazine. Jornal Oficial da Presidência da República Democrática de Timor-Leste, vol 1, no. 1: 12–13. High-resolution pdf available for download at, Dili, East-Timor.
- 2010 – "Geopolitica del Ciberspazio", Quaderni Speciali di Limes. Rivista Italiana di Geopolitica: 187–199, Roma.
- 2010 – '"Power-sharing in the Tropics and the ubiquitous ‘Presidential drift’: the mechanics and dynamics of unstable equilibrium in the semi-presidentialism of East Timor'", in (ed.) Michael Leach et al., Understanding Timor-Leste: 131-139, Hawthorn, Swinburne Press, Australia.
- 2010 – "The Regional Aftermath of the ‘Five Day War". Political, economic, and security overheads of the conflict in Georgia, Boletim do Instituto de Estudos Superiores Militares 7: 165-211, Ministério da Defesa, Portugal, with Radu Dudau.
- 2009 – A Guerra dos Cinco Dias. A Invasão da Geórgia pela Federação Russa, Instituto de Estudos Superiores Militares e Prefácio, Ministério da Defesa, Lisboa [preface by Admiral Álvaro Sabino Guerreiro] [reviewed in Relações Internacionais 25: 147–150, by Luís Tomé
- 2009 – '"The Unpredictability of Contemporary Global Conflicts'", 43. Jahrbuch 2007/08, Diplomatiche Akademie Wien: 224–246, Vienna, Austria.
- 2009 – "Serbia, the EU, NATO and the hope of a bulk accession into the Union of the Western Balkans. Reflections around the Ljubljana Agenda for the New Phase in the Stabilization and Association Process", in The Ljubljana Agenda for the New Phase in the Stabilization and Association Process, Evroski Pokret u Srbji & Friedrich Ebert Stiftung, Berlin, Germany and Belgrade, Serbia [the paper is available at https://web.archive.org/web/20131122004832/http://www.emins.org/ljagenda/index.html].
- 2008 – '"Is there a global al-Qaeda? Some thoughts on the organizational limits of contemporary transnational terrorist groups'", Public Lectures 2008: 47–58, Ministry of Foreign Affairs, Sofia, Bulgaria [publié, aussi, en version française: "Existe-t-il une al-Qaida Mondiale? Quelques réfléxions sur les limites organizationelles des mouvements terroristes transnationaux contemporains"].
- 2008 – "Queen Elizabeth's visit to Portugal, 1957'", in the 2008 Annual Report of the British Historical Society, pp. 13–30.
- 2008 – Raising Diplomats. Political, genealogical and administrative constraints in training for diplomacy, Favorita Series, Diplomatiche Akademie, Vienna, Austria [prefaced by Jiří Gruša].
- 2007 – Ligações Perigosas. Conectividade, Coordenação e Aprendizagem em Redes Terroristas, Almedina, Coimbra [reviewed by Major-General J.M. Freire Nogueira, Segurança e Defesa 7].
- 2007 – "A ‘Linha da Frente’. Do Sudoeste dos Balcãs à Ásia Central", Geopolítica, 1: 19–77, Centro Português de Geopolítica, Lisboa [also available for download at https://web.archive.org/web/20130515060652/http://www.cepen.org/2010/03/a-%e2%80%9clinha-da-frente%e2%80%9d-do-sudoeste-dos-balcas-a-asia-central/, Brasil].
- 2006 – Trei Conferente, a collection of three essays published by the Institutul Diplomatic Roman, Bucuresti, Romania [prefaced by Vlad Nistor].
- 2005 – Entre Factos e Razões. Contextos e Enquadramentos da Antropologia Jurídica. Almedina, Coimbra.
- 2005 – Sociedade Civil e Estado em Angola. O Estado e a Sociedade Civil sobreviverão um ao outro? Almedina, Coimbra.
- 2004 – "Sobre a União Europeia e a NATO", Nação e Defesa 106: 33–76, Instituto de Defesa Nacional, Ministério da Defesa, Lisboa, http://www.idn.gov.pt/publicacoes/nacaodefesa/textointegral/NeD106.pdf
- 2004 – O Estudo dos Sistemas Jurídicos Africanos. Estado, Sociedade, Direito e Poder, Almedina, Coimbra.
- 2003 – Pluralismo e Legitimação. A edificação jurídica pós-colonial de Angola, Almedina. This monographic study has as co-authors Carlos Feijó, Carlos de Freitas, N’gunu Tiny, Francisco Pereira Coutinho, Raquel Barradas de Freitas, Ravi Afonso Pereira and Ricardo do Nascimento Ferreira.
- 2003 – Litígios e Pluralismo. Estado, sociedade civil e Direito em São Tomé e Príncipe, Almedina, Coimbra. This monographic study has as co-authors N’gunu Tiny, Ravi Afonso Pereira, Margarida Damião Ferreira and Diogo Girão.
- 2002 – '"Wanders and wonders: musing over nationalism and identity in the state of East Timor"', in Nationbuilding in East Timor, Pearson Peacekeeping Institute, Canada.
- 2002 – "Thinking East Timor, Indonesia and Southeast Asia", Lusotopies, Karthala, Centre National pour la Recherche Scientifique (CNRS), Paris.
- 2002 – Litígios e pluralismo em Cabo Verde. A organização judiciária e os meios alternativos, a monographic study with, as co-authors, Maria José Lopes, Yara Miranda, João Dono and Patrícia Monteiro, Direito e Cidadania 14: 305–364, Praia, Cabo Verde.

== Personal life ==
Marques Guedes is the son of Armando Manuel de Almeida Marques Guedes (1919–2012), a public law professor of historical renown and the first President of the Portuguese Constitutional Court; and elder brother of Luís Marques Guedes, Portugal's Minister of the Presidency and of Parliamentary Affairs between 2010 and November 2015.

He is married to Christina Robertstad Garcia Benito, a Norwegian/Spanish industrial designer trained in Italy, at the famous postgraduate Scuola Politecnica di Design (SPD) focused on project disciplines in the areas of design and visual communication. They have three children: Constanza (born 1994), Leonor (born 1995) and Francisco (born 2001). The family currently resides in Oslo, Lisbon, London and Kent.
