= Eduardo Oliveira e Sousa =

Portuguese agricultural engineer and politician

Member of the Assembly of the Republic
- In office 26 March 2024 – 2 August 2024
- Constituency: Santarém

President of the Confederation of Farmers of Portugal
- In office 19 April 2017 – 17 May 2023
- Preceded by: João Machado
- Succeeded by: Álvaro Mendonça e Moura

Vice President of the Confederation of Farmers of Portugal
- In office 2005–2008
- President: João Machado

Personal details
- Born: Eduardo Manuel Drummond de Oliveira e Sousa; 5 May 1953 (age 73) Salvaterra de Magos, Portugal
- Party: Independent
- Other political affiliations: Democratic Alliance (2024–present)
- Children: 2
- Education: Instituto Superior de Agronomia
- Occupation: Agricultural engineer • Politician

Eduardo Manuel Drummond de Oliveira e Sousa (born 5 May 1953) is a Portuguese agricultural engineer and politician. He has a degree in Agricultural Engineering from the Instituto Superior de Agronomia, in Lisbon.

He was Agricultural Director of the National Zootechnical Station (1979–1983), Assistant Professor of General Agriculture and Agricultural Machines, and Pastures and Forages, at the Escola Superior Agrária of Santarém (1981–1984) and Agricultural Director of the first Sugar factory installed in mainland Portugal, SUCRAL (1986–1989), responsible for introducing sugar beet cultivation.

For three decades (1983–2013), he was the State Representative and executive director of the Sorraia Valley Irrigation Association, the body responsible for the Sorraia Valley Irrigation Work, which benefits 15,000 hectares of land in Alentejo and Ribatejo.

He was President of the Confederation of Farmers of Portugal (CAP) for two terms, from 2017 to 2023, having previously been its Vice President (2005–2008).

In January 2024, he was announced as candidate number one, on the Democratic Alliance's Santarém list for the 2024 legislative elections.
