= Idália Serrão =

Portuguese politician

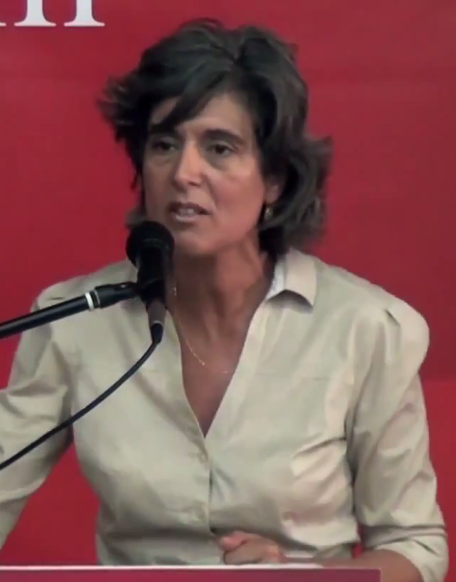

Deputy Secretary of State for Rehabilitation, Portugal
- In office 2005–2011

Deputy of the Assembly of the Republic
- In office 2005–2019

Personal details
- Born: Idália Maria Marques Salvador Serrão; 16 May 1964 (age 61) Lisbon, Portugal
- Party: Portuguese: Socialist Party (PS)
- Spouse: 1. Silvestre Fonseca 2. Carlos Alberto Moniz
- Children: Two

Idália Serrão (born 1964) is a Portuguese politician who has also worked as a violinist and television producer and is now a board member of a leading Portuguese bank.

== Early life ==
Idália Maria Marques Salvador Serrão de Meneses Moniz was born in the Portuguese capital of Lisbon on 16 May 1964, the daughter of António Salvador Serrão and Suzete Luísa Marques Salvador. The family is of Romani origin since she is granddaughter to a Romani grandfather. She obtained a degree in Social Science and also received musical training, playing with symphony orchestras and chamber music groups. She has also taken PhD courses at the Instituto Superior de Ciências Sociais e Políticas (ISCSP) in Lisbon. In 1993 she joined the team responsible for children's programming for the television channel Televisão Independente, broadcasting as TVI, working in areas such as dubbing foreign shows and preparing musical soundtracks.

== Political career ==
Serrão joined the Portuguese Socialist Party (PS) in 1990. She was president of the Parish Council of Almoster in the Santarém municipality between 1998 and 2002 and then became a councillor in the Santarém municipality from 2002 until 2016. During this period, her activities included being president of the municipal health council as well as vice president of the commission for the protection of children and young people. She was also involved in developing a municipal plan for prevention of drug addiction in Santarém and in coordinating municipal support to immigrants and ethnic minorities. Serrão lives in Almoster. She has married and divorced twice, first with the guitarist, Silvestre Fonseca, with whom she has a daughter, and second with the singer and composer, Carlos Alberto Moniz, with whom she has a son.

In 2004 Serrão was a candidate for the European Parliament but was not elected. Between 2005 and 2019, she was a Deputy for the PS in the Assembly of the Republic of Portugal, representing Santarém. In 2005, she was elected to the National Secretariat of the Socialist Party, a position she held until 31 May 2014, when she resigned following differences with the party leader António José Seguro. She continued to be a member of the political committee of the PS. Starting in 2005 she was Deputy Secretary of State for Rehabilitation under the 17th and 18th Constitutional Governments of Portugal. She attempted to become mayor of Santárem in 2013, without success. In 2016 she resigned from the municipal council, citing the need to make way for new blood.

== Later activities ==
Serrão resigned her position in the National Assembly in 2019 in order to take up a role on the Board of the Associação Mutualista Montepio, which runs the mutual savings bank, Banco Montepio. Her decision to leave parliament for a job in the private sector led to some criticism.
