= Alliance (Portugal) =

Centre-right political party

Alliance Aliança
- Abbreviation: A
- President: Jorge Nuno de Sá
- Founder: Pedro Santana Lopes
- Founded: 23 October 2018
- Dissolved: 4 March 2025; 14 months ago
- Split from: Social Democratic Party
- Headquarters: Avenida da República, 49-2º, 1050-088 Lisboa
- Ideology: Fiscal conservatism; Conservative liberalism; Social conservatism
- Political position: Centre-right
- Colours: Blue

Alliance (Portuguese: Aliança) was a political party in Portugal founded by former Prime Minister Pedro Santana Lopes, following his departure from the PSD. It was dissolved in 2025.

== History ==
The idea of Pedro Santana Lopes, former Prime Minister of Portugal, founding a party (with the proposed name being Social Liberal Party, PSL, after his initials) had been floated around earlier in the late 1990's and in 2011, both times after he lost leadership elections.

Following the 2018 Social Democratic Party (PSD) leadership election, after he was defeated by Rui Rio in a 54–46 margin, Santana Lopes left the PSD and announced his intention of founding a new party. In August 2018, the new name of the party was announced, Alliance.

The party's first congress was held in Évora, in February 2019, which confirmed Santana Lopes as the first leader of the party.

In the May 2019 European Parliament election, Alliance won 1.9% of the votes, failing to elect the party's main candidate Paulo Sande, a result which allowed for the party to elect MPs in the upcoming legislative elections. Despite that, and the fact that Alliance polled at 4% at some point, the party failed to elect a single seat in the 2019 legislative election.

Santana Lopes left the party in January 2021, deeming his experience in the party as a failure. He was replaced in the leadership by Paulo Bento, a former PSD City Councillor from Torres Vedras, after he won the leadership election with 110 votes over the 40 votes of his opponent António Pedro.

In October 2021, Jorge Nuno de Sá, former leader of the Social Democratic Youth, was elected as President of the party. He led the party into the 2022 and 2024 legislative elections, the last as part of the Alternative 21 coalition with the Earth Party.

The party ended up being dissolved by the Constitutional Court in March 2025.

== Policy positions ==
- Transform the Assembly of the Republic into a bicameral legislature with a Senate
- A balanced budget, tighter controls over public spending, and lower taxes
- Introduce alternative and individualized pension schemes to compensate for the increasing aging population
- Electoral reform

Pedro Santana Lopes has stated that the party identifies itself with the liberal Renew Europe group in the EU Parliament.

== Leaders ==
- Pedro Santana Lopes: 23 October 2018 – 27 September 2020
- Paulo Bento: 27 September 2020 – 31 October 2021
- Jorge Nuno de Sá: 31 October 2021 – 4 March 2025

== Election results ==
=== Assembly of the Republic ===
Election	Leader	Votes	%	Seats	+/-	Government
2019	Pedro Santana Lopes	40,175	0.8 (#10)	0 / 230		No seats
2022	Jorge Nuno de Sá	1,902	0.0 (#22)	0 / 230	0	No seats
2024	Jorge Nuno de Sá	Alternative 21		0 / 230	0	No seats

=== European Parliament ===
Election	Leader	Votes	%	Seats	+/-
2019	Paulo Sande	61,652	1.9 (#7)	0 / 21	

=== Regional Assemblies ===
Region	Election	Main candidate	Votes	%	Seats	+/-	Government
Madeira	2019	Joaquim Batalha de Sousa	766	0.5 (#11)	0 / 47		No seats
Azores	2020	Paulo Silva	422	0.4 (#10)	0 / 57		No seats
