= Alexandre Poço =

Portuguese politician (born 1992)

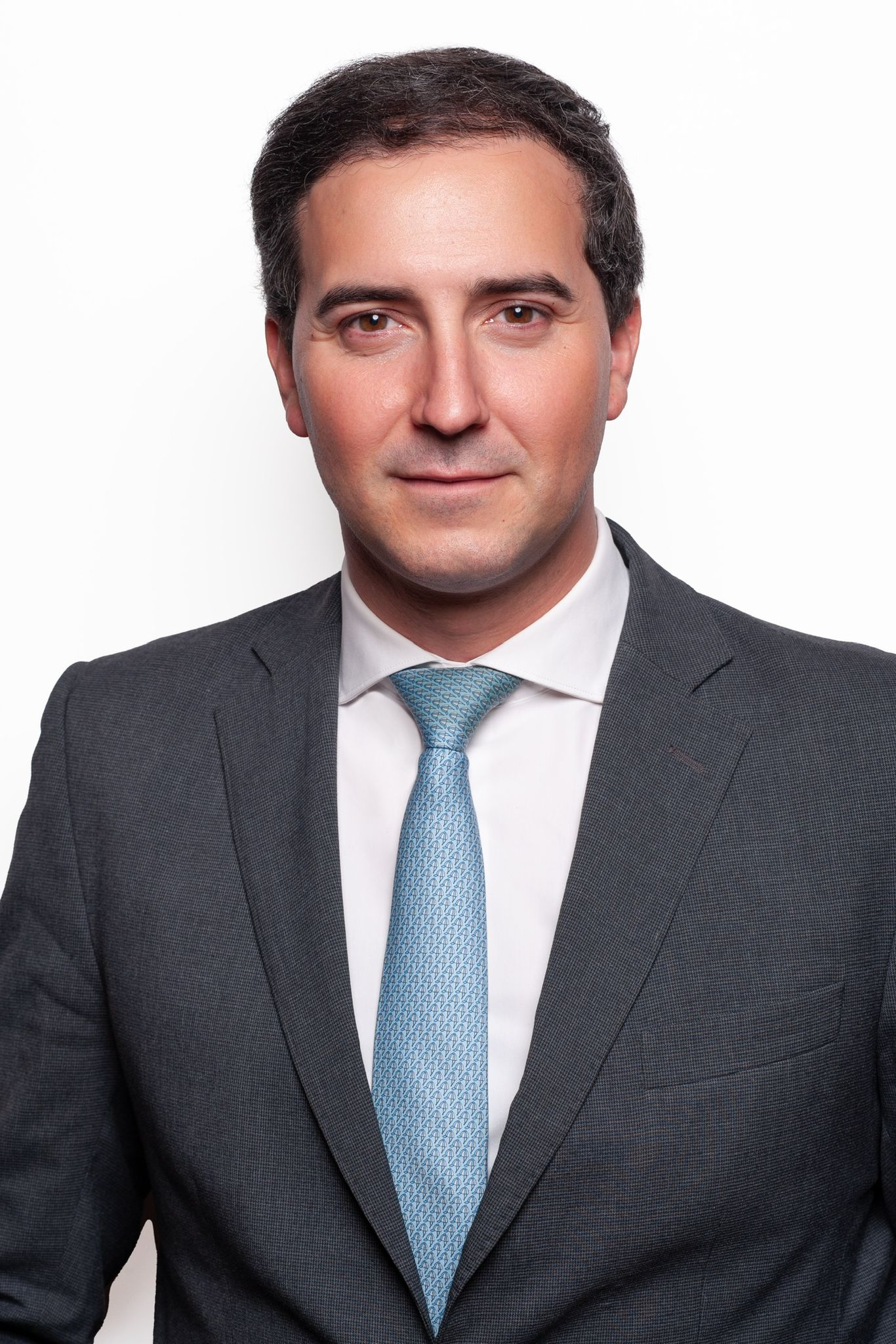
- Official portrait, 2024

President of the Social Democratic Youth
- In office 26 July 2020 – 23 June 2024
- Preceded by: Margarida Balseiro Lopes
- Succeeded by: João Pedro Louro

Member of the Assembly of the Republic
- Incumbent
- Assumed office 25 October 2019
- Constituency: Lisbon

Personal details
- Born: 4 July 1992 (age 34) Oeiras, Portugal
- Party: Social Democratic Party
- Education: NOVA University Lisbon

Alexandre Damasceno da Silva Poço (born 4 July 1992) is a Portuguese politician of the Social Democratic Party. Since 2019, he has been a member of the Assembly of the Republic. From 2020 to 2024, he was the leader of the Social Democratic Youth.
