= Luís Marques Guedes =

Portuguese lawyer and politician

Minister of Regional Development
- In office 30 October 2015 – 26 November 2015
- Prime Minister: Pedro Passos Coelho
- Preceded by: Miguel Poiares Maduro
- Succeeded by: Ana Abrunhosa

Minister of the Presidency
- In office 13 April 2013 – 26 November 2015
- Prime Minister: Pedro Passos Coelho
- Preceded by: Pedro Silva Pereira
- Succeeded by: Maria Manuel Leitão Marques

Minister of Parliamentary Affairs
- In office 13 April 2013 – 30 October 2015
- Prime Minister: Pedro Passos Coelho
- Preceded by: Miguel Relvas
- Succeeded by: Carlos Costa Neves

Secretary of State for the Presidency of the Council of Ministers
- In office 21 June 2011 – 13 April 2013
- Prime Minister: Pedro Passos Coelho
- Preceded by: João Tiago Silveira
- Succeeded by: Tiago Antunes

Secretary-General of the Social Democratic Party
- In office 20 June 2008 – 11 October 2010
- President: Manuela Ferreira Leite; Pedro Passos Coelho
- Preceded by: José Ribau Esteves
- Succeeded by: Miguel Relvas

Secretary of State Assistant to the Prime Minister
- In office 7 December 1993 – 28 October 1995
- Prime Minister: Aníbal Cavaco Silva
- Preceded by: António Campos
- Succeeded by: Joaquim Pina Moura

Member of the Assembly of the Republic
- In office 31 October 1995 – 28 March 2022
- Constituency: Porto (1995–1999); Santarém (1999–2002); Lisbon (2002–2022)

Personal details
- Born: 25 August 1957 (age 69) Lisbon, Portugal
- Party: Social Democratic Party
- Spouse: Ana Carlota de Andrade
- Children: 2
- Education: University of Lisbon

Luís Maria de Barros Serra Marques Guedes (born 25 August 1957) is a Portuguese lawyer and politician. He was Secretary of State for the Presidency of the Council of Ministers of the government of Pedro Passos Coelho, Secretary of State to the Prime Minister of Portugal, and the Government XII Undersecretary of State Assistant to the Prime Minister. He held the position of Chairman of the Parliamentary Group of the Social Democratic Party, of which he has been a member since 1995. When he ceased his activities as Minister of the Presidency, in late 2015, he became President of the Parliamentary Commission on Ethics, a section of the First Commission on Fundamental Rights.

He was deputy mayor of Cascais, and was responsible for the legal departments, municipal police, and civil protection. He was also a member of the Municipal Assembly of Cascais and chairman of the Youth Institute.

He is a younger brother of Armando Marques Guedes, political scientist, anthropologist and former diplomat.

Party political offices
Preceded by José Ribau Esteves	Secretary-General of the Social Democratic Party; 2008–2010	Succeeded by Miguel Relvas
Political offices
Preceded by António Campos (1985)	Assistant Secretary of State to the Prime Minister; 1993–1995	Succeeded by Joaquim Pina Moura
Preceded by João Tiago Silveira	Secretary of State for the Presidency of the Council of Ministers; 2011–2013	Succeeded by Tiago Antunes
Preceded by Pedro Silva Pereira as Minister of the Presidency	Minister of the Presidency and Parliamentary Affairs; 2013–2015	Succeeded by Himself as Minister of the Presidency and Regional Development
Preceded by Miguel Relvas as Assistant Minister for Parliamentary Affairs	Minister of the Presidency and Parliamentary Affairs; 2013–2015	Succeeded by Carlos Costa Neves as Minister of Parliamentary Affairs
Preceded by Himself as Minister of the Presidency and Parliamentary Affairs	Minister of the Presidency and Regional Development; 2015	Succeeded by Maria Manuel Leitão Marques as Minister of the Presidency and Administrative Modernization
Preceded by Miguel Poiares Maduro as Minister of Regional Development	Minister of the Presidency and Regional Development; 2015	Succeeded by Ana Abrunhosa as Minister of Territorial Cohesion
