= Coleman v Attridge Law =

ECJ employment law case concerning discrimination by association

- Court: European Court of Justice
- Citations: C-303/06; [2007] IRLR 88
- Transcript: Full transcript at BAILII.org

Case history
- Prior action: [2007] IRLR 88

Case opinions
- Advocate General Maduro's Opinion

Keywords
- Disability discrimination, definition, Unfair dismissal, "on grounds"; Associative discrimination

Coleman v Attridge Law (2008) C-303/06 (and AG Opinion) is an employment law case heard by the European Court of Justice. The question is whether the European Union's discrimination policy covers not just people who are disabled (or have a particular sex, race, religion, belief and age) but people who suffer discrimination because they are related or connected to disabled people. At the beginning of 2008, Advocate General Maduro delivered his opinion, supporting an inclusive approach. He said discrimination law is there to combat all forms of discrimination, including those connected to protected groups of people.

== Facts ==
Sharon Coleman had a disabled son, Oliver, with bronchomalacia and congenital laryngomalacia. She worked as a secretary for a small London law firm called Attridge Law (now rebranded EBR Attridge Solicitors LLP). They accused her of using her child as a way to manipulate requests for working time.

Coleman, represented by London law firm Bates Wells Braithwaite, claimed unfair dismissal as a result of her treatment (under the Employment Rights Act 1996, s.94). However, under the Disability Discrimination Act 1995 s 4, it states that one may consider oneself discriminated against (leading to unfair dismissal compensation) only if the treatment is "against a disabled person". Because Coleman was not herself disabled, the question was whether the 1995 Act had properly implemented the European Union Directive 2000/78/EC on the matter.

In their defence against the claim for, Attridge law argued that the 1995 Act could not be interpreted in line with the directive, whatever it meant.

== Judgment ==
=== Employment Appeal Tribunal ===
Peter Clark J for the Employment Appeal Tribunal held that it was wrong to say the Act could not be interpreted in line with the Directive. But he reserved his judgment and decided to refer the question to the European Court of Justice, on what the correct interpretation of Directive

=== Advocate General's Opinion ===
In the Advocate General's Opinion, Miguel Poiares Maduro generalised his statements for all the protected categories under the Framework Directive (religion, age, sexuality). He said,

“One way of undermining the dignity and autonomy of people who belong to a certain group is to target not them, but third persons who are closely associated with them and do not themselves belong to the group." (para. 12)

The preparatory argument is built around the driving force behind Article 13 TEC, on which the Directive is based. Then is cited Ronald Dworkin's philosophy on what it means to protect dignity, that it is a fundamental value for everyone, even among those who disagree about how it is realised. He also referred to Joseph Raz, on the idea that autonomy presupposes that individuals have an available number of valuable choices, and the law is to be concerned in protecting them.

From the law itself, Maduro relies on the wording of the first Article of the Directive which says it wants to combat discrimination 'on the grounds of' those categories. He characterises the action against Sharon as direct discrimination (para. 20). Comparing typical discrimination to this, he says,

"In the former case, we think that such conduct is wrong and must be prohibited; the latter is exactly the same in every material aspect." (para. 22)

Also, recital 6, emphasises 'the importance of combating every form of discrimination.' (para. 24)

Statistically, 80% of Advocate General's opinions are followed.

=== European Court of Justice ===
The ECJ released its judgment on 31 July 2008, and held that Sharon Coleman should succeed in her suit against the law firm. It did not follow from the relevant provisions of Directive 2000/78 that the principle of equal treatment is limited to people who themselves have a disability within the meaning of the Directive:

On the contrary, the purpose of the Directive, as regards employment and occupation, is to combat all forms of discrimination on grounds of disability. The principle of equal treatment enshrined in the Directive in that area applies not to a particular category of person but by reference to the grounds mentioned in Article 1. That interpretation is supported by the wording of Article 13 EC, which constitutes the legal basis of Directive 2000/78, and which confers on the Community the competence to take appropriate action to combat discrimination based, inter alia, on disability.

Commenting on the judgment, Lucy McLynn, partner at Bates Wells Braithwaite, said: "It is a great victory for common sense and for legal clarity, as well as for Sharon personally."

The decision may have a significant impact on people in the UK who are not currently protected by discrimination legislation. 6 million carers exist in the UK currently, and with an ageing population, 9 million are projected by 2037 according to Carers UK.

=== Further proceedings before the Employment Tribunal ===
On its return to the Employment Tribunal, the law firm appealed against a preliminary ruling that the Tribunal had jurisdiction to entertain the claim. On that preliminary point, in EBR Attridge Law LLP & Anor v Coleman [2009] UKEAT 0071 09 3010 (30 October 2009) the Employment Appeal Tribunal held that for an employer to treat an able-bodied employee caring for a disabled child less favourably than another employee in a comparable situation was associative discrimination, notwithstanding the specific references in the Disabilit. The case was remitted to the first-instance Tribunal for a full hearing.

== See also ==
- Employment discrimination law in the UK
