= João Pedro Louro =

Portuguese politician (born 1994)

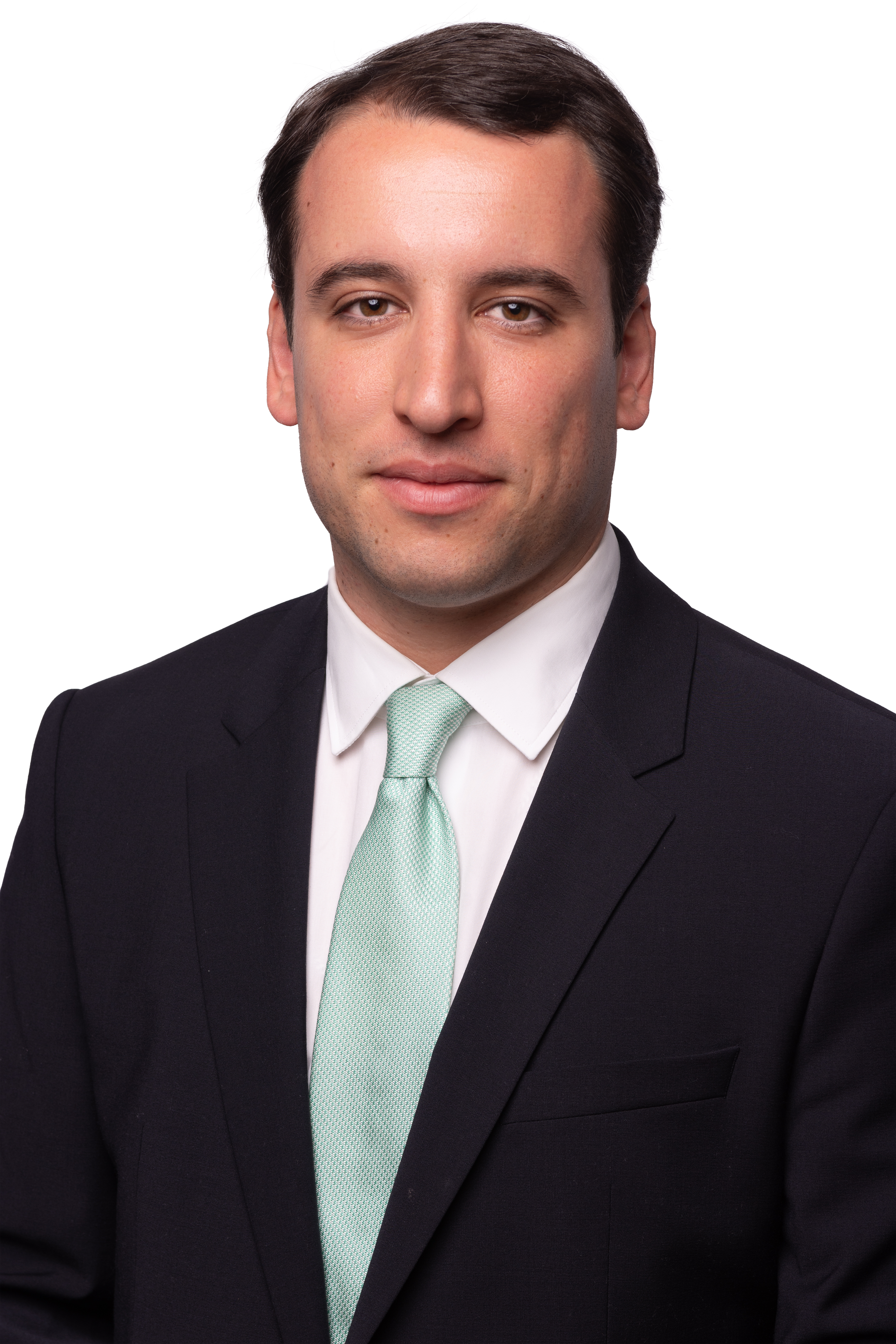
- Official portrait, 2025

President of the Social Democratic Youth
- Incumbent
- Assumed office 23 June 2024
- Preceded by: Alexandre Poço

Member of the Assembly of the Republic
- Incumbent
- Assumed office 3 June 2025
- Constituency: Lisbon

Secretary-General of the Social Democratic Youth
- In office 26 July 2020 – 23 June 2024
- President: Alexandre Poço

President of the Social Democratic Youth of the Setúbal District
- In office 21 March 2016 – 6 January 2019
- Preceded by: Pedro Filipe Tomás
- Succeeded by: Tiago Sousa Santos

Personal details
- Born: João Pedro Vila Viçosa Louro; 11 October 1994 (age 31) Setúbal, Portugal
- Party: Social Democratic Party
- Other political affiliations: Social Democratic Youth (since 2011)
- Education: Instituto Superior de Ciências Sociais e Políticas

João Pedro Vila Viçosa Louro (born 11 October 1994) is a Portuguese politician who was elected member of the Assembly of the Republic in 2025. He has served as president of the Social Democratic Youth since 2024.
