= Pedro Correia (politician) =

Portuguese politician (born 1974)

Member of the Assembly of the Republic
- Incumbent
- Assumed office 26 March 2024
- Constituency: Santarém

Personal details
- Born: 22 November 1974 (age 51)
- Party: Chega

Pedro Alexandre Arrabaça da Silva Oliveira Correia (born 22 November 1974) is a Portuguese politician serving as a member of the Assembly of the Republic since 2024. From 2021 to 2023, he was a municipal councillor of Santarém.
