= Isaura Morais =

Portuguese politician

Member of the Assembly of the Republic
- Incumbent
- Assumed office 25 October 2019
- Constituency: Santarém

Mayor of Rio Maior
- In office 11 October 2009 – 23 August 2019
- Preceded by: Silvino Sequeira
- Succeeded by: Luís Filipe Dias

Personal details
- Born: Isaura Maria Elias Crisóstomo; 19 June 1966 (age 60) Rio Maior, Santarém District, Portugal
- Party: Social Democratic Party
- Spouse: António Bernardino Morais (died 1999)
- Children: 1

Isaura Maria Elias Crisóstomo Bernardino Morais (born 19 June 1966) is a Portuguese politician. She is a member of the centre-right Social Democratic Party (PSD), Morais was elected to the Assembly of the Republic in 2019 as a representative of the Santarém constituency and re-elected in January 2022 and March 2024.

She is a domestic violence survivor.

== Early life and education ==
Isaura Maria Elias Crisóstomo Bernardino Morais was born on 19 June 1966 in Rio Maior in Portugal. Her parents were farmers. She graduated in human resources management.

== Career ==
Morais was married to António José Bernardino Morais, an engineer, who died of leukemia in 1999. They had one daughter. After his death, she went to night school to do post-graduate studies in marketing management and began her professional life in the field of graphic arts. Her husband had been a PSD councillor for the municipality of Rio Maior and in 2001 she also decided to join the party and was elected president of the Rio Maior parish council. In 2009, she was elected president of the Rio Maior municipality with 49.21% of the votes, the first defeat for the Portuguese Socialist Party in Rio Maior for 24 years. She held this post until 2019.

In 2019 she was invited to head the PSD list for the Santarém constituency in the national election. She accepted as, after three terms, it would not have been possible for her to stay on the municipal council, and was duly elected to the Assembly of the Republic. In Parliament, she chaired the parliamentary committee on Public Administration, Administrative Modernization, Decentralization and Local Power. She also served as a vice-president of the National Political Commission of the PSD. In the 2022 election she was again first on the PSD list, with the party winning three of the nine seats available in the constituency. In 2024 she was re-elected as the third-choice candidate of the Democratic Alliance.

After being chosen in March 2013 to be part of the Portuguese Sports Foundation's executive committee for the management of high-performance centres, to represent municipalities with such centres, in December of the same year Morais was appointed to be a member of the National Sports Council (Conselho Nacional do Desporto), joining famous Portuguese sports people such as the Olympic marathon winners, Carlos Lopes and Rosa Mota, and the racing driver, Pedro Couceiro. Her appointment was seen as a recognition of her contribution to the achievements of Rio Maior in promoting sports and supporting national sporting teams.

== Personal life ==
In 2010 Morais filed a complaint to the police regarding abuse she received at the hands of her partner. Her decision to go to the police after enduring abuse for some time was widely applauded.
