= Pedro Rodrigues (politician) =

Portuguese politician (born 1979)

Member of the Assembly of the Republic
- In office 25 October 2019 – 4 December 2021
- Constituency: Lisbon
- In office 15 October 2009 – 31 March 2011
- Constituency: Braga

Leader of the Social Democratic Youth
- In office 22 April 2007 – 28 November 2010
- Preceded by: Daniel Fangueiro
- Succeeded by: Duarte Marques

Personal details
- Born: 27 July 1979 (age 46)
- Party: Social Democratic Party

Pedro Nuno Mazeda Pereira Neto Rodrigues (born 27 July 1979) is a Portuguese politician of the Social Democratic Party. He was a member of the Assembly of the Republic from 2009 to 2011 and from 2019 to 2022. From 2007 to 2010, he was the leader of the Social Democratic Youth.
