= Duarte Marques (politician) =

Portuguese consultant and politician

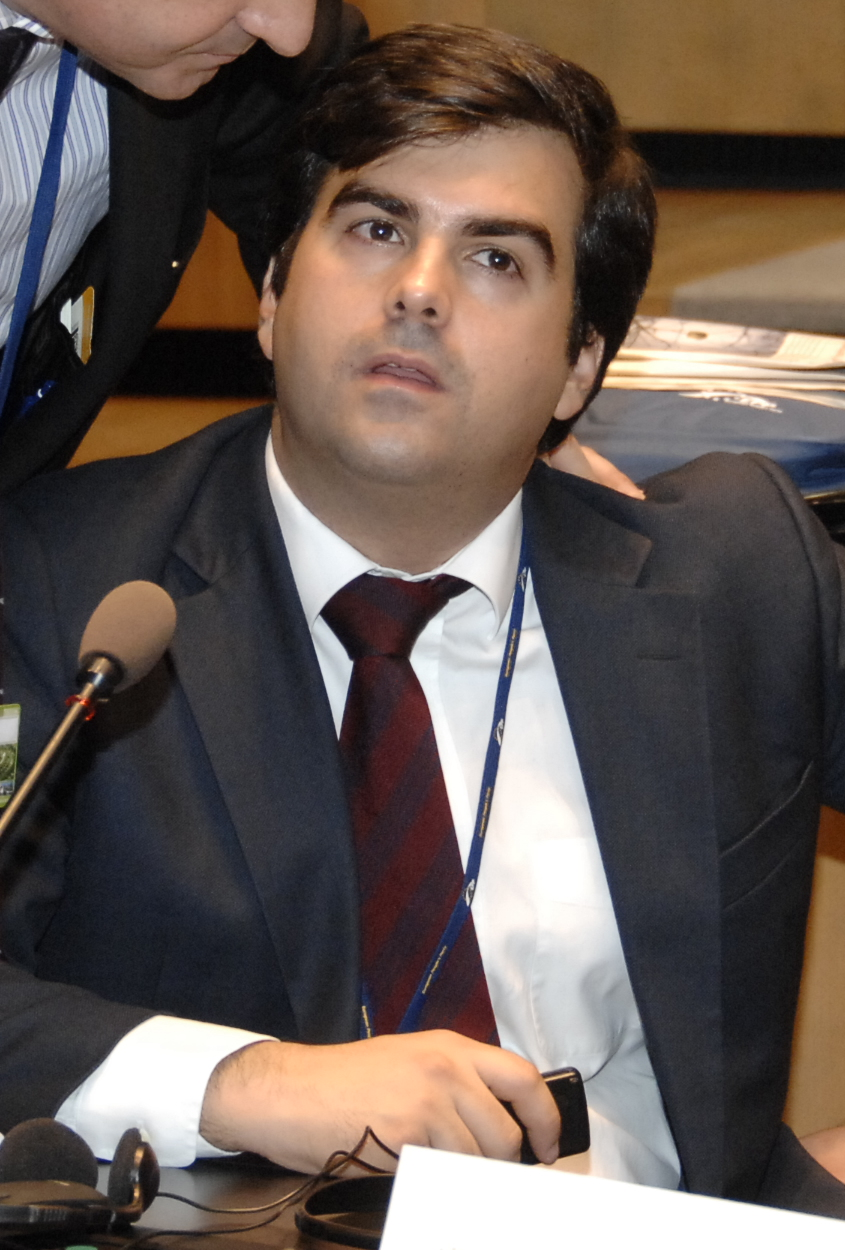

President of the Social Democratic Youth
- In office November 2010 – December 2012
- Party Leader: Pedro Passos Coelho
- Preceded by: Pedro Rodrigues
- Succeeded by: Hugo Soares

Member of the Assembly of the Republic
- In office 21 June 2011 – 28 March 2022
- Constituency: Santarém

Personal details
- Born: Duarte Filipe Baptista de Matos Marques; 9 May 1981 (age 45) Mação, Santarém District, Portugal
- Party: Social Democratic Party
- Education: Technical University of Lisbon
- Occupation: Politician
- Profession: Consultant

Duarte Filipe Baptista de Matos Marques (born 9 May 1981) is a Portuguese consultant and politician, who is a member of the Assembly of the Republic, having been elected since 2011 from the Santarém constituency. He is a former president of the Social Democratic Youth, holding office from 2010 to 2012.
