= Pedro Augusto Cunha Pinto =

Portuguese manager and politician

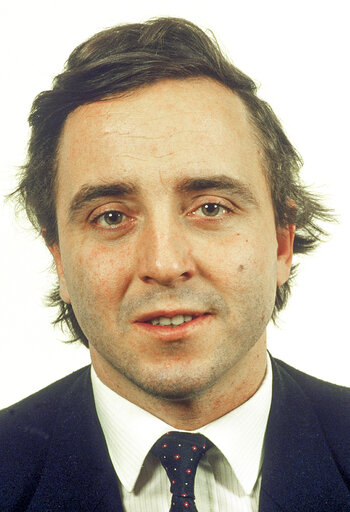
- Official portrait as an MEP, 1987

Member of the Assembly of the Republic

Personal details
- Born: October 24, 1956 (age 69) Maquela do Zombo, Angola
- Party: Social Democratic Party
- Profession: Manager

Pedro Augusto Cunha Pinto (born October 24, 1956) is a Portuguese manager and politician. He served as vice-president of the Lisbon City Council, administrator of Lisboa Capital da Cultura, Metro de Lisboa, MARL, President of Lismarketing SGPS, and Administrator of Associação Parque Junqueira. He was also President of the Tourism Association of Lisbon (ATL) and Secretary-General of the Confederation of Regional Business Associations (CAER). He was the parliamentary coordinator of the PSD in the Eventual Commission for Monitoring the Measures of the Financial Assistance Program to Portugal. He was a Member of the European Parliament and a Member of the Portuguese Parliament. From 2015 to 2019, he was the president of the Board of Directors of the Assembly of the Republic.

== Biography ==
He was born in Maquela do Zombo, Angola, the son of João Baptista Pinto and Maria Alice Cunha Pinto. He completed his studies at the Salvador Correia High School in Luanda. After the revolution of 1974 and following the independence of Angola, he returned to Portugal in 1975, at the age of 18, to reside in Porto.

While working as a student, he attended the ISCTE – University Institute of Lisbon, becoming involved in the academic struggles of 1976 against the dominant current of MES. During this period, he began to take an interest in political life.

As a member of the Youth and the Social Democratic Party, he was president of JSD, becoming one of the youngest deputies in the Portuguese parliament, which is why he is considered one of the most experienced deputies in office. In 1985, he joined the first group of Portuguese MEPs in the European Parliament until 1989. In 1997, he was the head of the PSD list for the Municipal Assembly of Matosinhos. In 2001, he directed the campaign of Pedro Santana Lopes for the Lisbon City Council, later joining the municipal executive. In 2004, he assumed the vice-presidency of the Lisbon City Council, associated with some of the most media-covered works of the mandate, such as the Marquês Tunnel, the relocation of the Feira do Relógio, and the Bela Vista Park. Still in the Lisbon City Council, he was responsible for negotiating with Roberto Medina to bring Rock in Rio to Lisbon.
