= Social Democratic Youth (Portugal) =

Youth organisation of the Social Democratic Party of Portugal

Social Democratic Youth Juventude Social Democrata
- President: João Pedro Luís
- Founded: 1974
- Headquarters: Lisbon, Portugal
- Ideology: Liberal conservatism Christian democracy
- Mother party: Social Democratic Party
- International affiliation: Youth of the Centrist Democrat International
- European affiliation: Youth of the European People's Party
- Website: www.jsd.pt

Social Democratic Youth (Portuguese: Juventude Social Democrata) is the youth organisation of the Social Democratic Party of Portugal and it is commonly known by its initials, JSD. Founded by Francisco Sá Carneiro, the JSD has become an essential basis of the PSD itself. Its activity is recognized in election campaigns, with a crucial position in terms of mobilization and as a "laboratory of ideas of the party". While defending the values affirmed by the Social Democratic Party, the JSD is a structure with its own identity and, therefore, works in an autonomous manner in respect to the party.

Nowadays, the JSD has mainly based his political activity in areas such as education, entrepreneurship, employment, housing, environment, addiction and childhood obesity. In addition to this, the JSD defends a constitutional review of the Portuguese Constitution, and advocates European integration, employment, culture and environment, generational issues in which the JSD focuses its intervention.

== List of presidents ==
No.	Portrait	Name	Start	End	Leader of the PSD
1		António Rebelo de Sousa (b. 1952)	1 June 1975	3 December 1978	Emídio Guerreiro
1		António Rebelo de Sousa (b. 1952)	1 June 1975	3 December 1978	Francisco Sá Carneiro
1		António Rebelo de Sousa (b. 1952)	1 June 1975	3 December 1978	António Sousa Franco
1		António Rebelo de Sousa (b. 1952)	1 June 1975	3 December 1978	José Menéres Pimentel
1		António Rebelo de Sousa (b. 1952)	1 June 1975	3 December 1978	Francisco Sá Carneiro
2		António Lacerda de Queiroz (b. 1953)	3 December 1978	21 October 1982	Francisco Sá Carneiro
2		António Lacerda de Queiroz (b. 1953)	3 December 1978	21 October 1982	Francisco Pinto Balsemão
3		Pedro Augusto Cunha Pinto (b. 1956)	21 October 1982	5 November 1986	Francisco Pinto Balsemão
3		Pedro Augusto Cunha Pinto (b. 1956)	21 October 1982	5 November 1986	Nuno Rodrigues dos Santos
3		Pedro Augusto Cunha Pinto (b. 1956)	21 October 1982	5 November 1986	Carlos Mota Pinto
3		Pedro Augusto Cunha Pinto (b. 1956)	21 October 1982	5 November 1986	Rui Machete
3		Pedro Augusto Cunha Pinto (b. 1956)	21 October 1982	5 November 1986	Aníbal Cavaco Silva
4		Carlos Coelho (b. 1960)	5 November 1986	11 March 1990	Aníbal Cavaco Silva
5		Pedro Passos Coelho (b. 1964)	11 March 1990	17 December 1995	Aníbal Cavaco Silva
5		Pedro Passos Coelho (b. 1964)	11 March 1990	17 December 1995	Fernando Nogueira
6		Jorge Moreira da Silva (b. 1971)	17 December 1995	5 September 1998	Fernando Nogueira
6		Jorge Moreira da Silva (b. 1971)	17 December 1995	5 September 1998	Marcelo Rebelo de Sousa
7		Pedro Duarte (b. 1973)	5 September 1998	29 September 2002	Marcelo Rebelo de Sousa
7		Pedro Duarte (b. 1973)	5 September 1998	29 September 2002	José Durão Barroso
8		Jorge Nuno de Sá (b. 1977)	29 September 2002	20 March 2005	José Durão Barroso
8		Jorge Nuno de Sá (b. 1977)	29 September 2002	20 March 2005	Pedro Santana Lopes
9		Daniel Fangueiro (b. 1979)	20 March 2005	22 April 2007	Pedro Santana Lopes
9		Daniel Fangueiro (b. 1979)	20 March 2005	22 April 2007	Luís Marques Mendes
10		Pedro Rodrigues (b. 1979)	22 April 2007	28 November 2010	Luís Marques Mendes
10		Pedro Rodrigues (b. 1979)	22 April 2007	28 November 2010	Luís Filipe Menezes
10		Pedro Rodrigues (b. 1979)	22 April 2007	28 November 2010	Manuela Ferreira Leite
10		Pedro Rodrigues (b. 1979)	22 April 2007	28 November 2010	Pedro Passos Coelho
11		Duarte Marques (b. 1981)	28 November 2010	16 December 2012	Pedro Passos Coelho
12		Hugo Soares (b. 1983)	16 December 2012	14 December 2014	Pedro Passos Coelho
13		Simão Ribeiro (b. 1986)	14 December 2014	15 April 2018	Pedro Passos Coelho
14		Margarida Balseiro Lopes (b. 1989)	15 April 2018	26 July 2020	Rui Rio
15		Alexandre Poço (b. 1992)	26 July 2020	23 June 2024	Rui Rio
15		Alexandre Poço (b. 1992)	26 July 2020	23 June 2024	Luís Montenegro
16		João Pedro Louro (b. 1994)	23 June 2024	24 May 2026	Luís Montenegro
17		João Pedro Luís (b. 2002)	24 May 2026	Incumbent	Luís Montenegro
