= Jorge Lacão =

Portuguese lawyer and politician (born 1954)

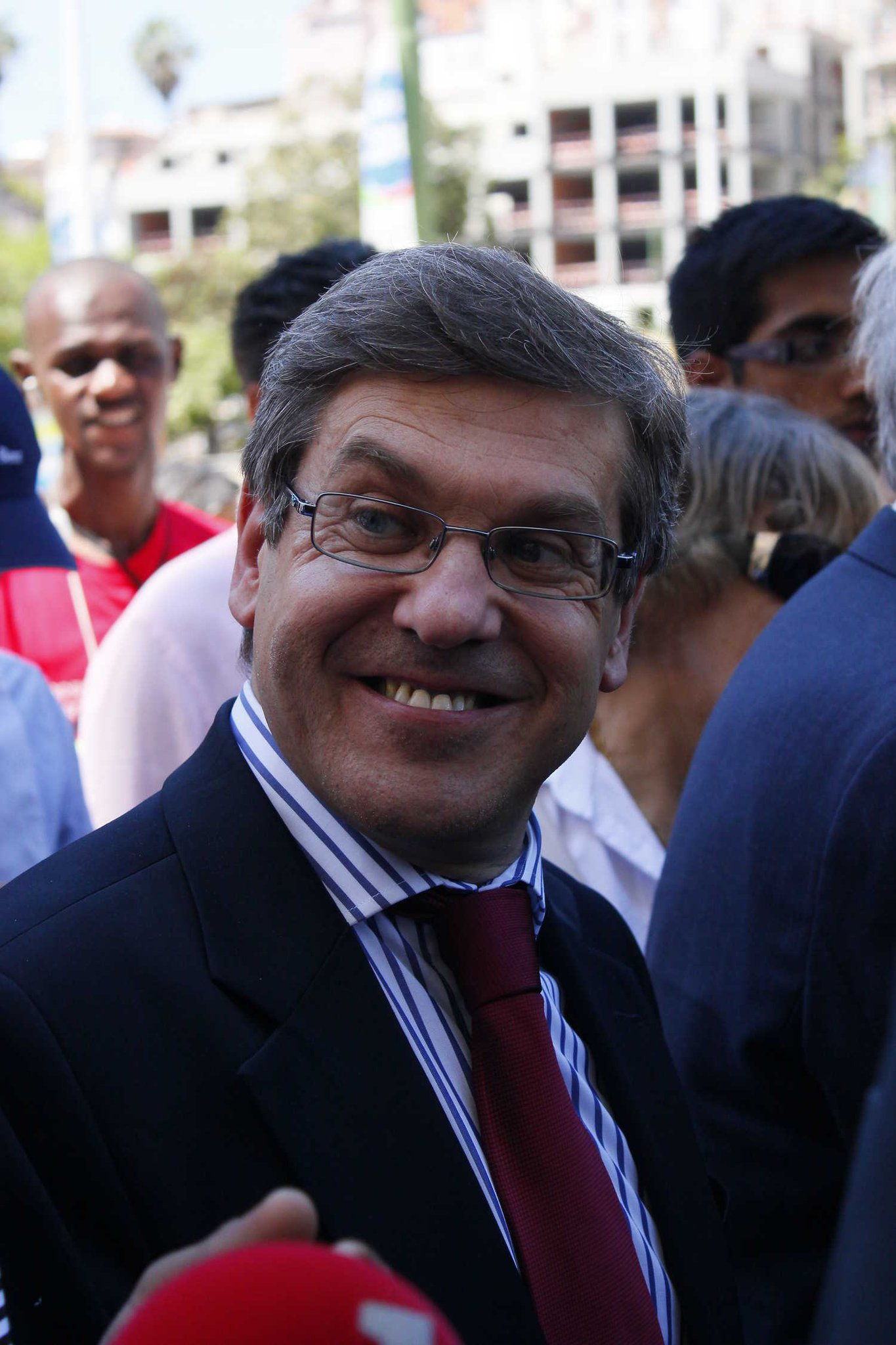
- Lacão in 2011

Minister for Parliamentary Affairs
- In office 26 October 2009 – 20 June 2011
- Prime Minister: José Sócrates
- Preceded by: Augusto Santos Silva
- Succeeded by: Miguel Relvas

Personal details
- Born: September 4, 1954 (age 71) Alagoa, Portalegre, Portugal
- Party: Socialist Party
- Profession: Lawyer; politician

Jorge Lacão Costa (born 4 September 1954) is a Portuguese lawyer and politician. He served as Minister for Parliamentary Affairs in the XVIII Constitutional Government of Portugal, from 2009 to 2011.

== Early life and education ==
Lacão was born in Alagoa, Portalegre, on 4 September 1954.

== Political career ==
Lacão was elected as a member of the Portuguese Parliament for the Socialist Party multiple times between 1983 and 2022. He served as Secretary of State for the Presidency of the Council of Ministers in the XVII Constitutional Government, from 2005 to 2009. From 2009 to 2011, he served as Minister for Parliamentary Affairs in the XVII Constitutional Government.

In 2014, Lacão resigned from the National Secretariat of the Socialist Party due to disagreements with the leadership of António José Seguro.

== Honors ==
- Commander of the Order of Merit of the Italian Republic (Italy, 18 July 1990)
