= Miguel Relvas =

Portuguese politician

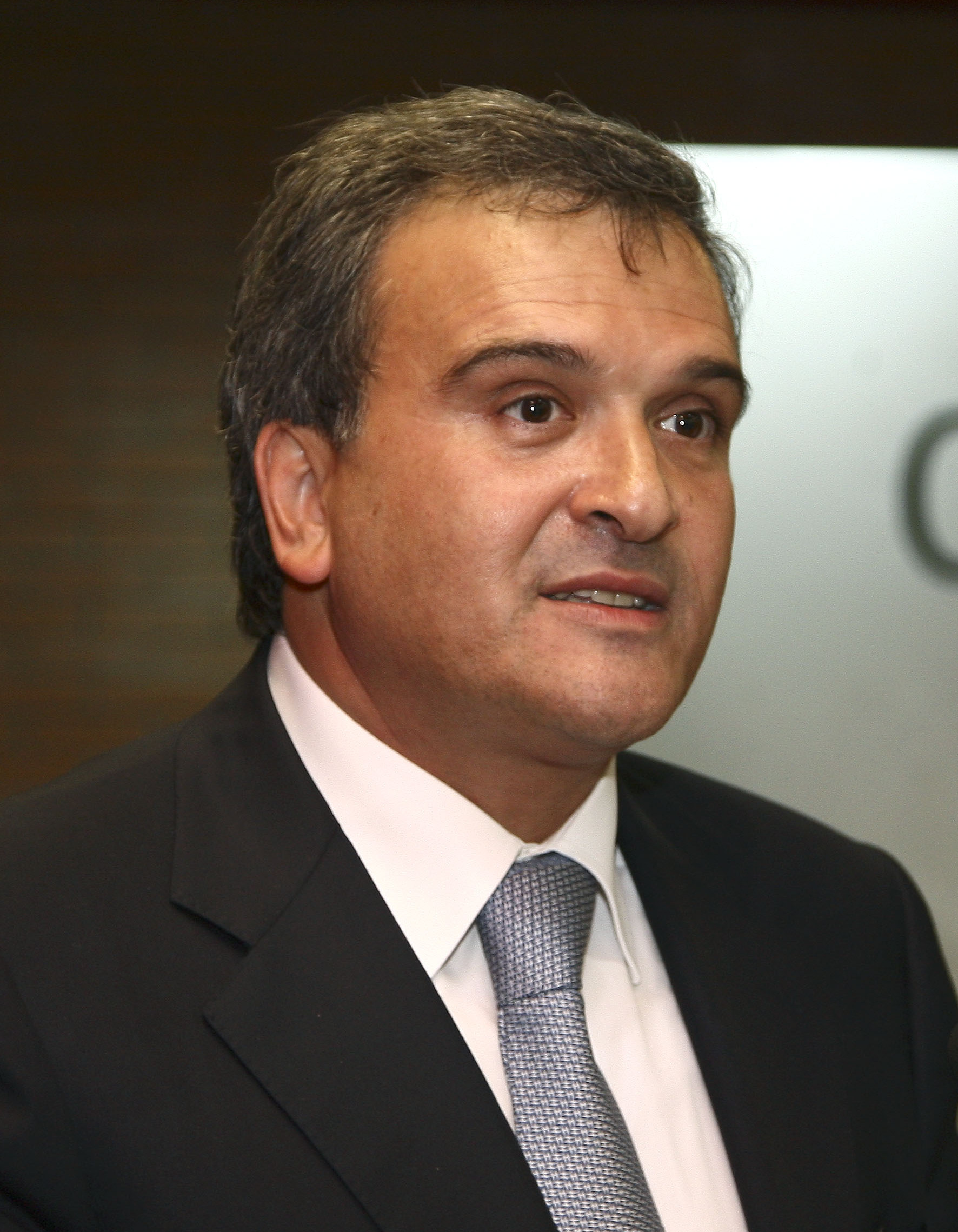
- Relvas in 2013

Minister in the Cabinet of the Prime Minister and for Parliamentary Affairs
- In office 21 June 2011 – 4 April 2013
- Prime Minister: Pedro Passos Coelho
- Preceded by: Pedro Silva Pereira
- Succeeded by: Luís Marques Guedes

Secretary-General of the Social Democratic Party
- In office 11 April 2010 – 12 June 2011
- President: Pedro Passos Coelho
- Preceded by: Luís Marques Guedes
- Succeeded by: José Matos Rosa
- In office 23 May 2004 – 10 April 2005
- President: José Manuel Barroso; Pedro Santana Lopes
- Preceded by: José Luís Arnaut
- Succeeded by: Miguel Macedo

Secretary of State for Local Government
- In office 8 April 2002 – 21 May 2004
- Prime Minister: José Durão Barroso
- Preceded by: José Augusto de Carvalho
- Succeeded by: Paulo Pereira Coelho

Personal details
- Born: 5 September 1961 (age 65) Lisbon, Portugal
- Party: Social Democratic Party (1980–present)
- Children: 3
- Education: Lusophone University
- Profession: Business manager

Miguel Fernando Cassola de Miranda Relvas (born 5 September 1961) is a Portuguese politician and former Secretary General of the Social Democratic Party.

He was a deputy for more than 20 years, served as Secretary of State for Local Administration during the XV Constitutional Government of Portugal and Deputy Minister of Parliamentary Affairs during the XIX Constitutional Government of Portugal.

== Political career ==
Miguel Relvas political life started in the Tomar branch of Juventude Social Democrata the youth wing of the PSD. At 24 years of age he was included in a non-electable slot in PSD's Santarém district list to the 1985 legislative elections, but, when PSD did better than expected and one the candidates ahead of him (Luís Miral Amaral) became government minister, Miguel Relvas squeaked into the Portuguese Parliament where he remained until 2009. He quickly rose in the party ranks becoming secretary-general of JSD in 1987–89, Secretary of State for Local Government in 2002–04, secretary-general of the PSD in 2004–05, and again reappointed in 2010.

Miguel Relvas represented PSD in several parliamentary commissions and built a reputation as a major party operational and campaign manager. In 2010, he was decisive in rallying up the votes to elect as PSD president Pedro Passos Coelho setting the stage to become Joint-Minister("Ministro-Adjunto" in Portuguese or "Minister Assistant" in the official government translation) and Minister of Parliamentary Affairs after Passos Coelho won the 2011 legislative elections. Despite being outranked in the cabinet by two Ministers of State, Miguel Relvas was widely acknowledged to be the right-hand man of Prime Minister Pedro Passos Coelho and was considered the de facto deputy prime-Minister until mid-2012 when he resigned (see details below).

As Joint-Minister in the Passos Coelho government, Miguel Relvas was personally in charge of the key and highly sensitive political reforms of the civil service hierarchies and local political redistricting and representation, of the privatization of one of Portugal's two public TV (RTP) channels. and, as became apparent in December 2012, of the national airline TAP These reforms were envisaged in Portugal's ECB/EU/IMF-financed economic adjustment program for 2011-13. However, the Relvas-managed reforms fell well short of expectations since neither RTP nor TAP were privatized during 2012 as envisaged in the program and the local administration reform was only done at micro-level ('freguesias') leaving the much more costly municipal administrations untouched.

Since 1998, Miguel Relvas has been President of the Municipal Assembly of Tomar—his town of political origin and a longtime PSD stronghold.

== Business dealings ==
According to his official biography, Miguel Relvas is a "business manager by profession" who "served as CEO and consultant to various companies." As stated in his Parliamentary declarations, from 2005, Miguel Relvas worked as a consultant for Barrocas, Sarmento & Neves, for Societé Générale de Surveillance (SGS S.A.) and for Roff-Independent Consultants, and as a manager for Prointec, although it was later revealed that he only worked for a few months in each of these corporations. He also worked for private ventures (like Kapaconsult, Finertec and Alert Life Sciences Computing) geared at high-level business facilitation. Miguel Relvas is reported to have focused on business in Africa and Brazil, where he established important political and business networks.

Miguel Relvas also lists in his official biography that he was chairman of the Knights Templar Tourism Region Organization (2001–02), Chairman of the Board of the General Meeting (sic) of the Middle (sic) Tagus Urban Community (2004–09), and Member of the Board of Trustees of the Portugal-Brazil Foundation (Fundação Luso-Brasileira).

== Controversies ==
=== Ethical and legal issues ===
Miguel Relvas has been involved in some controversies although he was never formally charged. Known instances include:

Supposed pocketing and abusing of official allowances - As a member of Parliament, Miguel Relvas was one of several Portuguese parliamentarians to have pocketed out-of-town housing allowances despite living in Lisbon, and airfare allowances for trips not made or made in lower classes of service than entitled. As president of the municipal assembly of Tomar, he made €30,000 in phone calls on his official phone paid for by the municipality.

Supposed cronyism - Upon becoming Minister of Parliamentary Affairs in 2011, Miguel Relvas appointed for himself and his four secretaries of state a total of 56 advisors ("assessores") and support staff—a remarkably high number as the total staff of his Ministry was only 65. The most blatant case was the hiring of his previous chauffeur from Parliament for €2,448 per month (compared with less than €1,000 for most government drivers) despite already having three Ministry chauffeurs at his disposal.

Supposed Influence Peddling - As business man, Miguel Relvas has worked for private companies (see above) seen as close to his PSD political party and geared towards doing business through high-level political connections in Portugal, Brazil and Africa. The Head the Portuguese Order of the Architects claimed in July 2012 that when Miguel Relvas was secretary of state in 2003 he sought to influence the awarding of a public procurement contract in favour of a company where (future Prime-Minister) Pedro Passos Coelho worked. Miguel Relvas refuted the allegation and said he was initiating a libel lawsuit but, in October 2012, it emerged that indeed Pedro Passos Coelho had personally sought to obtain the awarding of such contract for the company he represented—Tecnoforma, with Miguel Relvas' official backing. Moreover, it was also revealed that during Miguel Relvas' term as Secretary of State of Local Administration the large majority of EU financial support for two training programs in Portugal's center region were channelled to Tecnoforma but that the intended results never materialized. The investigation was withdrawn.

Supposed inflation of his academic credentials - Miguel Relvas obtained a bachelor's degree only in 2007 and under unusual circumstances (see below). It also emerged that when he became a member of the Portuguese Parliament in 1985, he had officially declared that he was a second-year law student, when in fact he had completed just one first-year course prior to dropping out. Miguel Relvas explained in 2012 that there had been "a lapse" and he had corrected that information latter in the year in a subsequent declaration. In characteristic display of chutzpah, Miguel Relvas announced right after obtaining his controversial BA degree that he was going to pursue a masters degree in political science.

Possible association to Portugal's secret services scandal - In 2011 a public scandal emerged in Portugal that came to be known as "caso das secretas" involving as main protagonist Jorge Jacob Silva Carvalho a former secret agent at two Portuguese intelligence agencies SIS and SIED (the so called secretas) and allegedly a Freemason lodge brother of Miguel Relvas (see below). Silva Carvalho resigned as Director of SIED in 2010 and, according to criminal charges against him made by the Portuguese attorney-general, he took with him unauthorized copies of the personal files of many prominent Portuguese figures. For undetermined reasons, Miguel Relvas first sought to limit press exposure of the case (see below) and then to distance himself from it, including by stating under oath that he had only once casually met Silva Carvalho. Media reports confirmed that Silva Carvalho and Relvas had met in person at least 3 times and communicated with each other by SMS. The "caso das secretas" has an internal PSD party dimension as one of the targeted personalities in Silva Carvalho's stolen personal files was former Portuguese prime-minister Francisco Pinto Balsemão who, like Relvas, is from the social-democratic party PSD but is at odds with Relvas over the privatization of a public TV channel that would increase competition on the channel (SIC) owned by Balsemão media group. Perhaps for these reasons, the Expresso weekly newspaper, also owned by Balsemão's media group, has joined the daily newspaper Público in seeking to show Miguel Relvas' association to the "caso das secretas."

Alleged intimidation of the press - Miguel Relvas found himself in a potentially criminal situation when the Público daily newspaper reported that he attempted to blackmail one of its journalists not to pursue a story on "caso das secretas" (see above). Allegedly, Miguel Relvas had called and threatened the journalist with revealing compromising details of her private life (a likely possibility in view of the precedent that another Público journalist had his calls intercepted by a Freemason associate of Relvas involved in the "caso das secretas"). Miguel Relvas admitted calling the journalist but denied making threats. The Press Regulatory Authority ERC launched an official enquiry that found no evidence Miguel Relvas obtained any private information or pressured the journalist (the majority of the members appointed to that enquiry's commission were from Miguel Relvas PSD party).

Denial of responsibility - To date, Miguel Relvas has never acknowledged wrongdoing or impropriety in any of his political, business, or academic endeavors, even when he was compelled to resign as a result of the irregularities in the attribution of his university degree (see below).

=== Connections to the Freemasonry ===
Miguel Relvas is said to be a Freemason and high-ranking member of the Universalis Lisbon masonic lodge that congregates important Portuguese politicians and businessmen. However, Freemasonry activities in Portugal are largely secretive and Miguel Relvas has not publicly confirmed or denied his membership.

=== Academic qualifications ===
In July 2012 Miguel Relvas found himself embroiled in public controversy in connection with the degree he obtained from Lusophone University/Universidade Lusófona with little coursework.

Miguel Relvas enrolled in 1984 at Universidade Livre, of Lisbon, where he sought to obtain a law-degree but completed just one course (political science and constitutional law) with the lowest passing grade (10 out of 20). In 1985 he switched majors from law to history but did not complete any course and eventually dropped out until 1995 when he enrolled at the international relations program of Universidade Lusíada (which was the rebaptized Universidade Livre after its courses lost their accreditation) but again did not to complete any courses.

In 2006, following the enactment of the Bologna Process that allowed awarding of university coursework credits to reflect professional experience under the ECTS-credits framework, Miguel Relvas managed to obtain from Universidade Lusófona 160 credit equivalencies out of the 180 necessary to obtain a bachelor's degree in political science and international relations. The credit equivalencies were awarded on the basis of his "rich professional experience" by the Dean of the university himself (Fernando Santos Neves) and were not made explicit in terms of the individual courses exempted. Miguel Relvas was only required to complete 4 courses (which he did with comfortable grades although there seem to be no records of him attending classes or taking tests) and was awarded in 2007 a BA degree with GPA of 11 (out of 20). It remains unclear what role the University's Board (Conselho Científico) played in this process and most of its members at the time have distanced themselves from this decision, which seems to have been personally taken by Dean Santos Neves, who resigned on July 12, 2012 from his Dean position but stayed with Universidade Lusófona in another capacity.

Portugal's Minister of Education Nuno Crato initially declined to comment on Relvas' degree, but in October 2010 he ordered an auditing of all of Universidade Lusófona's degrees by accreditation, which could result in the revocation of some of those degrees including Relvas'. The audit was supposed to be ready in "60 days" (i.e. before end-2012), but results were held until April 2013, just prior to which Miguel Relvas resigned abruptly and without acknowledging the audit's results as a reason for his resignation.

The audit confirmed that many of Relvas' course equivalencies were attributed without plausible experience or even experience of any sort and that he had taken no written exams in the four courses for which he did not obtain equivalencies. The Ministry of Education referred the process to the Portugal's Public Attorney's Office with a view to the revocation of Miguel Relvas' university degree, which took place by court decision in June 2016.

== In popular culture ==
In June 2012, Miguel Relvas gained instant and widespread name recognition thanks to the exceptional circumstances of his university degree attribution (see above). This is illustrated by two new memes devoted to Miguel Relvas. The first was a powerful, anti-government slogan "VAI ESTUDAR, RELVAS!" (Go Study, Relvas!). The second consisted of all sorts of ironic claims to academic degrees on the basis of equivalencies for vaguely related activities (for ex: engineer for having played with Lego blocks). The best example was when Pope Benedict XVI announced his resignation in February 2013, a new Relvas joke immediately went viral saying he was going to "ask for an equivalency to Pope on the basis of having attended a Catholic mass."

== Personal life ==
Miguel Relvas was born in Lisbon in 1961, but returned with his parents to Portuguese Angola, where he grew up with two younger brothers until just after the Carnation Revolution of April 1974 in Portugal that led to Angola's independence and the mass exodus of Portuguese citizens. The family resettled in the Tomar area of Portugal, where Relvas went to high school.

Miguel Relvas married in 1989 and, in 1992, a daughter was born from that union. He separated after becoming government Minister in 2011 and publicly assumed a relationship with Marta Sousa a PSD campaign staff 17 years his junior he had met in 2010 when she worked in the publishing of a book by Passos Coelho. He obtained a divorce in 2012 since he and Marta announced their wedding for March 2013.
