= 2025 Portuguese Socialist Party leadership election =

2025 Socialist Party leadership election
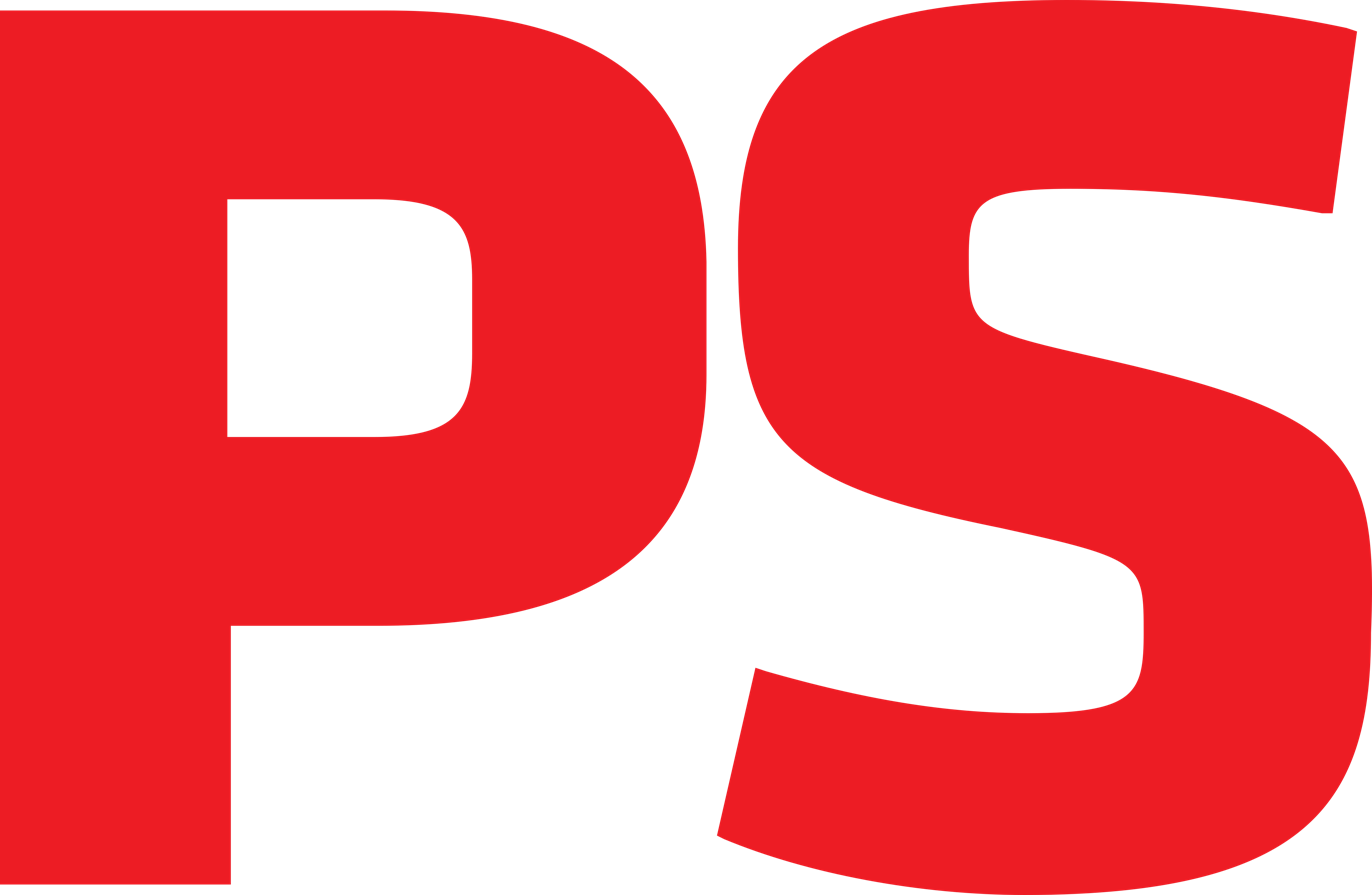
- 27–28 June 2025
- Turnout: 48.9% ▼19.8 pp
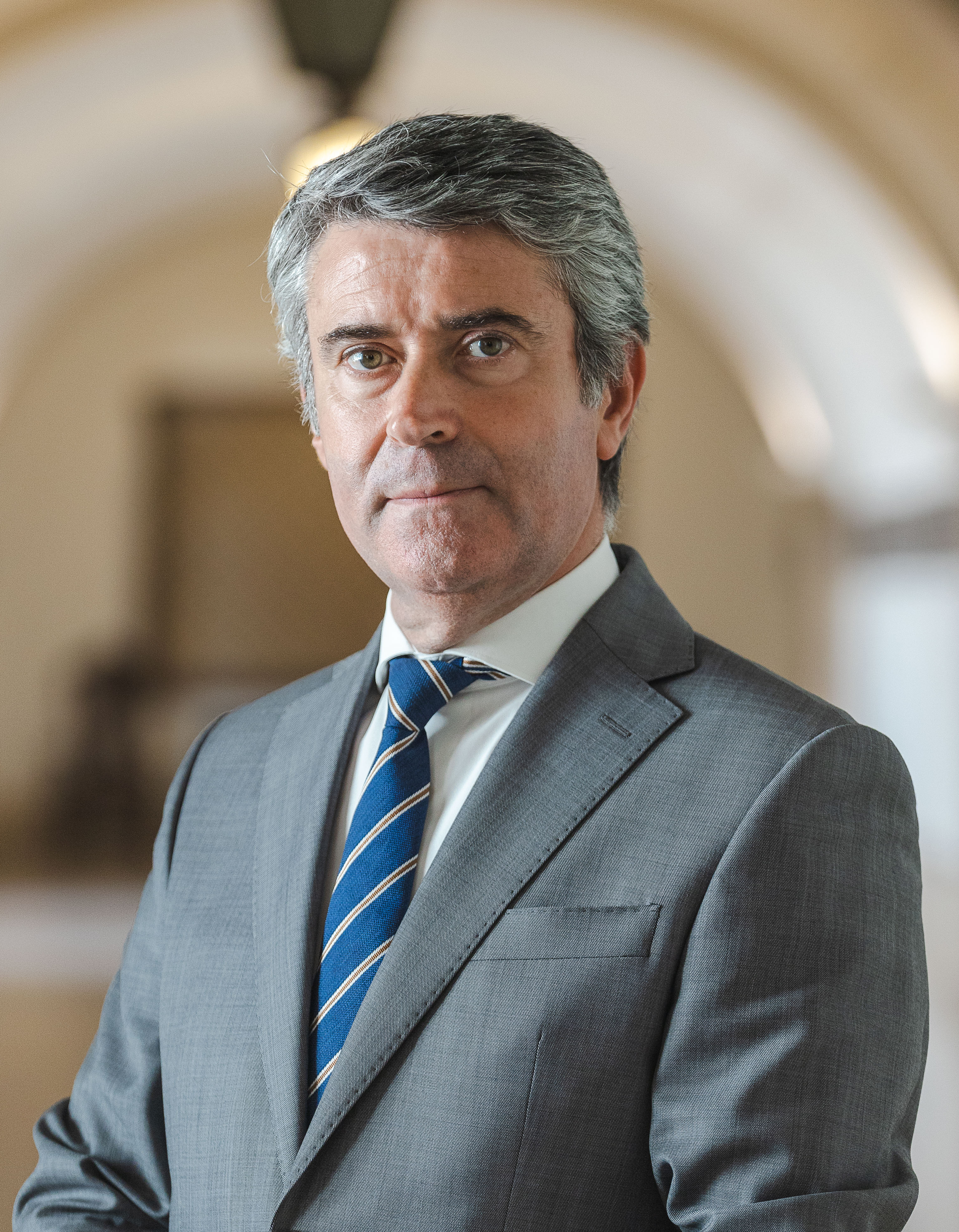
| Candidate | José Luís Carneiro |
| Popular vote | 17,434 |
| Percentage | 95.5% |
Secretary-General before election
Carlos César (acting)
Elected Secretary-General
José Luís Carneiro

The 2025 Portuguese Socialist Party leadership election was held on 27 and 28 June 2025 to elect a new Secretary General of the party following the defeat in the 2025 Portuguese legislative election. The election was called by Pedro Nuno Santos after achieving a disappointing third place and losing the status of leader of the opposition with him resigning and not seeking reelection.

After the Party President and acting Secretary General Carlos César declaring that the election will be held either in the last week of June or the first of July, Mariana Vieira da Silva and Fernando Medina, both highly speculated names of the Costista wing of the party to run for Secretary General, as well as Duarte Cordeiro and Alexandra Leitão, two of the closest alies of Pedro Nuno Santos and members of the left-wing faction of the party, declined to run in name of party unity and because of the short time necessary to prepare a candidacy. Because of this José Luís Carneiro, a high-profile member of the Segurista faction and Centrist wing of the party, and runner-up of the previous internal election, was expected to be the sole candidate.

This election, however, was not free from controversy with several prominent party members and leaders criticizing the speed with which Carneiro announced his candidacy, arguing that the party needed more time to reflect on the results, focus on the local elections with César leading the party and only then have the internal elections. One of these high-profile members was Mariana Vieira da Silva, considered to be the right-hand woman of António Costa and a member of Pedro Nuno Santos' national secretariat. Miguel Prata Roque, a television commentator and runner-up in the 2025 internal election for the Lisbon Urban Area Federation also considered a candidacy for the party leadership, rejecting that there is a broad consensus regarding Carneiro's candidacy, but ultimately decided not to run. After the deadline to submit candidacies was passed, Carneiro was the only candidate to submit a candidacy, making him Secretary-General elect. On election day, Carneiro was confirmed as party leader winning more than 95% of the votes.

== Candidates ==
=== Declared ===
| Name | Born | Experience | Announcement date | Ref. |
|---|---|---|---|---|
| José Luís Carneiro | 4 October 1971 (age 53); Baião | Member of Parliament for Braga (since 2024); Minister of Internal Administration (2022–2024); Deputy Secretary-general of the Socialist Party (2019–2022); Secretary of State for Portuguese Communities (2015–2019); Mayor of Baião (2005–2015); Member of Parliament for Porto (2005; 2015–2022) | 19 May 2025 | |

=== Declined ===
- Ana Catarina Mendes – Member of the European Parliament (since 2024), former Minister of Parliamentary Affairs (2022–2024); former Deputy Secretary-General of the Socialist Party (2015–2029); former Member of the Assembly of the Republic for Setúbal (1995–2024) (endorsed José Luís Carneiro)
- Alexandra Leitão – former president of the Socialist Party's Parliamentary group (2024–2025); former Member of Parliament for Santarém (2022–2025) and former Minister for the Modernization of the State and Public Administration (2019–2022) (running for Mayor of Lisbon)
- Daniel Adrião – candidate for the party's leadership in 2016, 2018, 2021 and 2023
- Duarte Cordeiro – former Minister of the Environment and Climate Action (2022–2024); former Member of the Assembly of the Republic for Setúbal (2011–2015) and Lisbon (2009–2011) and former Secretary-General of the Socialist Youth (2008–2010)
- Fernando Medina – former Member of Parliament for Lisbon (2022–2025), Viana do Castelo (2011–2013) and Beja (2009); former Minister of Finance (2022–2024) and Mayor of Lisbon (2015–2021)
- Francisco Assis – Member of the European Parliament (since 2024, also 2004–2009 and 2014–2019); former Member of the Assembly of the Republic for Porto (2024, 2011–2014, 1995–2004) and Guarda (2009–2011); former Mayor of Amarante (1989–1995) (endorsed José Luís Carneiro)
- Mariana Vieira da Silva – Member of Parliament for Lisbon (since 2024); former Minister of the Presidency (2019–2024)
- Marta Temido – Member of the European Parliament (since 2024); former Minister of Health (2018–2022); former Member of the Assembly of the Republic for Lisbon (2024) and Coimbra (2022–2024)
- Miguel Prata Roque – former Secretary of State for the Presidency of the Council of Ministers (2015–2017)

== Notable endorsements ==
José Luís Carneiro

Presidents of the Assembly of the Republic

- Augusto Santos Silva – former President of the Assembly of the Republic (2022–2024); former Minister of Foreign Affairs (2015–2022); former Minister of National Defense (2009–2011); former Minister of Parliamentary Affairs (2005–2009); former Minister of Culture (2001–2002); former Minister of Education (2000–2001)
- Eduardo Ferro Rodrigues – former President of the Assembly of the Republic (2015–2022); former Member of the Council of State (2016–2022); former Minister of Labour (1995–2001); former Member of the Assembly of the Republic (1985–1987, 1991–1995, 2002–2022) and former Secretary-General of the Socialist Party

Ministers

- Ana Mendes Godinho – former Minister of Labour, Solidarity and Social Security (2019–2024) and former Member of the Assembly of the Republic (2024–2025)
- Adalberto Campos Fernandes – former Minister of Health (2015–2018)
- Catarina Sarmento e Castro – former Minister of Justice (2022–2024) and Judge of the Constitutional Court (2010-2019)
- João Soares – former Minister of Culture (2015–2016); former Mayor of Lisbon (1995–2002); former Member of the Assembly of the Republic (1987–1991, 2002–2019)
- José Vera Jardim– former Minister of Justice (1995–1999); former Member of the Assembly of the Republic (1987–1995, 1999–2009)
- Luís Capoulas Santos – Member of the Assembly of the Republic for Évora (2019–2024), Minister of Agriculture (1998–2002, 2015–2019) and Member of the European Parliament (2004–2014)
- Manuel Pizarro – former Minister of Health (2022–2024); Member of the Assembly of the Republic (2024–2025, 2005–2015)
- Maria de Belém Roseira – Member of the Assembly of the Republic for Lisbon (2000–2015), Minister for Equality (1999–2000), Minister of Health (1995-1999), President of the Socialist Party (2011–2014) and candidate in the 2016 Portuguese presidential election

Members of Parliament

- Alberto Arons de Carvalho – former Member of the Assembly of the Republic (1975–1983, 1987–1995 and 2002–2005) and former Secretary-General of the Socialist Youth (1974–1978)
- António Mendonça Mendes – Member of the Assembly of the Republic (since 2024)
- Armando Mourisco – Member of the Assembly of the Republic (since 2025); former Mayor of Cinfães (2013–2025); Chair of the Viseu Federation of the Socialist Party
- Diogo Leão – former Member of the Assembly of the Republic (2019–2022)
- Eurico Brilhante Dias – Member of the Assembly of the Republic (since 2015)
- Francisco César – Member of the Assembly of the Republic for Azores (since 2022) and Chair of the Azores Federation of the Socialist Party
- Hugo Costa – Member of the Assembly of the Republic (since 2015) and Chair of the Santarém Federation of the Socialist Party
- Jamila Madeira – former Member of the Assembly of the Republic for Faro (since 1999–2025)
- João Portugal – former Member of the Assembly of the Republic (2005–2015); Chair of the Coimbra Federation of the Socialist Party
- João Paulo Correia – former Member of the Assembly of the Republic (2009–2022, 2024-2025) and former Secretary of State of Youth and Sports (2022–2024)
- João Torres – Member of the Assembly of the Republic for Porto and Deputy Secretary-General of the Socialist Party (2022–2024)
- Manuel Alegre – former Member of the Council of State (2022–2024, 1996–2002), Member of the Assembly of the Republic for Lisbon (2002–2009) and for Coimbra (1975–2002), honorary president of the Socialist Party (since 2024) and candidate in the 2006 and 2011 Portuguese presidential election
- Marcos Perestrello – Member of the Assembly of the Republic (since 2018, 2011–2015)
- Miguel Coelho – former Member of the Assembly of the Republic (1995–2019) and president of the civil parish of Santa Maria Maior (since 2013)
- Miguel Freitas – former Member of the Assembly of the Republic (2005–2015)
- Nuno Fazenda – Member of the Assembly of the Republic (since 2024, 2019–2022), former Secretary of State for tourism, commerce and services (2022–2024) and Chair of the Castelo Branco Federation of the Socialist Party
- Luís Graça – Member of the Assembly of the Republic (since 2015); Chair of the Algarve Federation of the Socialist Party
- Pedro Coimbra – Member of the Assembly of the Republic (since 2015, also 2002–2005)
- Pedro Delgado Alves – Member of the Assembly of the Republic (since 2011)
- Ricardo Pinheiro – Member of the Assembly of the Republic (since 2019) and former Mayor of Campo Maior (2009–2019)
- Rui Santos – Member of the Assembly of the Republic (since 2025); former Mayor of Vila Real (2013–2025); Chair of the Vila Real Federation of the Socialist Party
- Rui Soalheiro – former Member of the Assembly of the Republic (1995–2002)
- Sérgio Sousa Pinto – former Member of the Assembly of the Republic (1995–1999, 2009–2025); former Member of the European Parliament (1999–2009); former Secretary-general of the Socialist Youth (1994–2000)
- Tiago Barbosa Ribeiro – Member of the Assembly of the Republic for Porto (since 2015)

MEPs

- Ana Catarina Mendes – Member of the European Parliament (since 2024), former Minister of Parliamentary Affairs (2022–2024); former Deputy Secretary-General of the Socialist Party (2015–2029); former Member of the Assembly of the Republic for Setúbal (1995–2024)
- Francisco Assis – Member of the European Parliament (since 2024, also 2004–2009 and 2014–2019); former Member of the Assembly of the Republic for Porto (2024, 2011–2014, 1995–2004) and Guarda (2009–2011); former Mayor of Amarante (1989–1995)
- Pedro Silva Pereira – former Member of the European Parliament (2014–2024) and former Minister of the Presidency (2005–2011)

Mayors

- Inês de Medeiros– Mayor of Almada (since 2017) and former Member of the Assembly of the Republic (2009–2017)
- Paulo Cafôfo – Mayor of Funchal (2013–2019) and Secretary of State for Portuguese Communities (2022–2024)
- Pedro Ribeiro – Mayor of Almeirim (2013–2025) and Chair of the National Association of Socialist Mayors (since 2024)
- Ricardo Leão – Mayor of Loures (since 2021) and former Member of the Assembly of the Republic (2015–2021)

Individuals

- André Moz Caldas – former Secretary of State for the Presidency of the Council of Ministers (2019–2024) and former president of the civil parish of Alvalade
- Álvaro Beleza – President of SEDES and candidate for the party's leadership in 1992
- Fernanda Tadeu – Retired teacher (wife of António Costa)
- José Abrãao – Secretary General of the Federation of Public Administration Trade Unions
Refused to Endorse

Ministers

- Duarte Cordeiro – former Minister of the Environment and Climate Action (2022–2024), former Member of the Assembly of the Republic (2009–2015) and former Secretary-General of the Socialist Youth (2008–2010)
- Fernando Medina – former Minister of Finance (2022–2024), former Mayor of Lisbon (2015–2021) and former Member of Parliament (2024–2025, 2011–2013 and 2009)

Members of Parliament

- Mariana Vieira da Silva – Member of Parliament for Lisbon (since 2024); former Minister of the Presidency (2019–2024)

Members of Parliament

- Nuno Araújo – former Member of the Assembly of the Republic (2009–2011) and Chair of the Porto Federation of the Socialist Party

== Opinion polling ==
Hypothetical polling

All voters

| Polling firm | Fieldwork date | Sample size | José Luís Carneiro | Fernando Medina | Sérgio Sousa Pinto | Alexandra Leitão | Mariana Vieira da Silva | Francisco Assis | Ana Catarina Mendes | Duarte Cordeiro | Luísa Salgueiro | Daniel Adrião | O./U. | Lead |
|---|---|---|---|---|---|---|---|---|---|---|---|---|---|---|
| Intercampus | 5–15 Jun 2025 | 616 | 23.9 | 13.5 | —N/a | 6.8 | 10.4 | —N/a | —N/a | 2.8 | —N/a | —N/a | 42.7 | 10.4 |
| Pitagórica | 28–31 May 2025 | 500 | 32 | 12 | 11 | 6 | 6 | 5 | 3 | 2 | 1 | 0 | 22 | 20 |

== Results ==
| Candidate | 27 & 28 June 2025 | |
| Candidate | Votes | % |
|---|---|---|
| José Luís Carneiro | 17,434 | 95.46 |
| Total | 17,434 | |
| Valid votes | 17,434 | 95.46 |
| Invalid and blank ballots | 829 | 4.54 |
| Votes cast / turnout | 18,263 | 48.90 |
| Registered voters | ~37,330 | |

Vote share
| José Luís Carneiro | 95.46% |
| Blank/Invalid | 4.54% |

== Aftermath ==
Because a party congress, to confirm the newly elected leader and elect his leadership team, wasn't held after the election, questions arose about the validity of this vote. According to the party's statutes, holding a party congress following a leadership vote is mandatory, meaning that, without a party congress to confirm his election, Carneiro's leadership could be labeled as interim, thus forcing a new leadership ballot at short notice. The party's parliamentary leader, Eurico Brilhante Dias, later confirmed that the election of Carneiro was only to complete the term left vacant by former party leader Pedro Nuno Santos, which was due to expire in early 2026. A new leadership ballot was called for 13 and 14 March 2026, with a party congress between 27 and 29 March.
