= 2026 Portuguese Socialist Party leadership election =

2026 Socialist Party leadership election
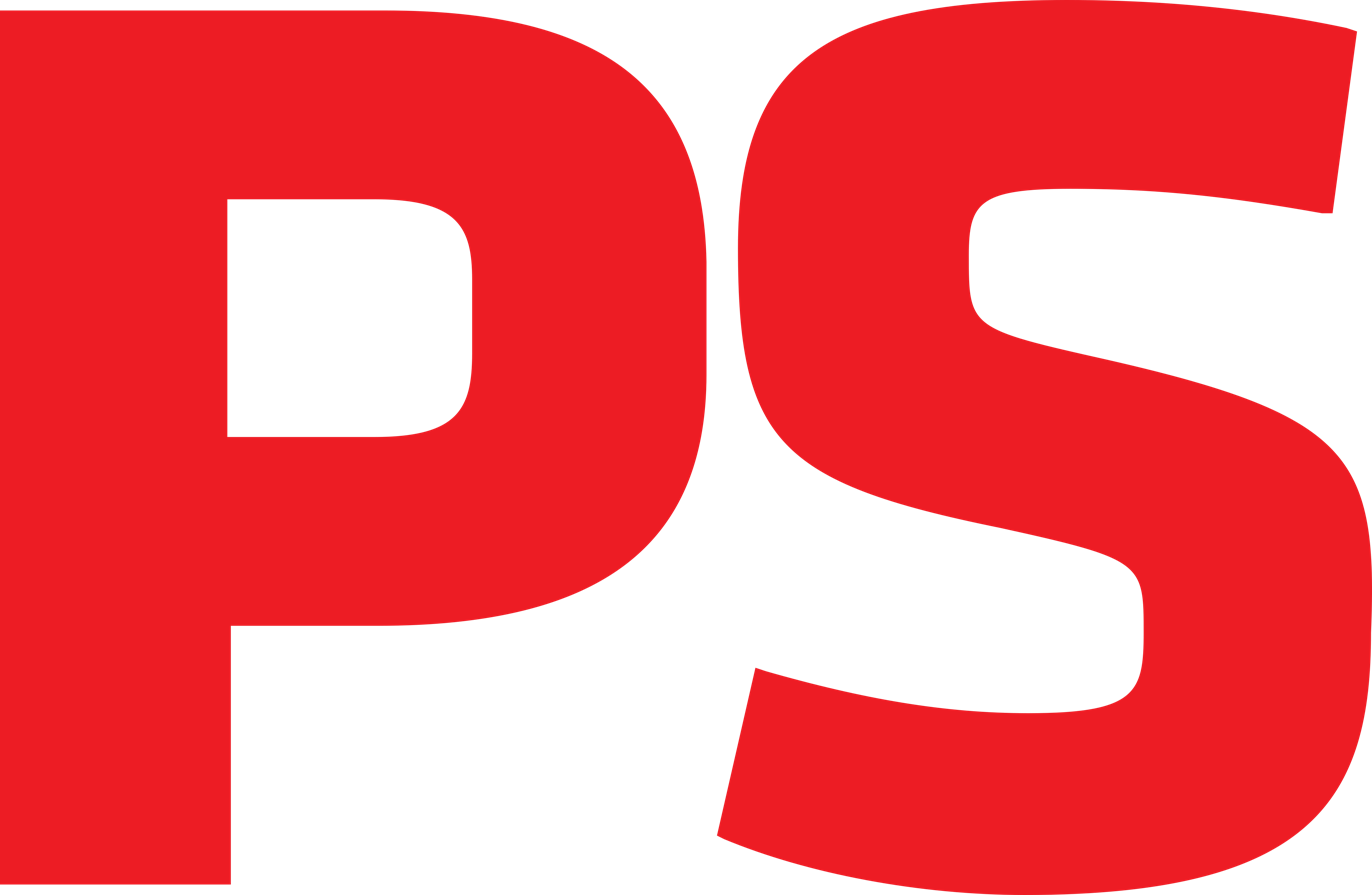
- 13–14 March 2026
- Turnout: 55.3% ▲6.4 pp
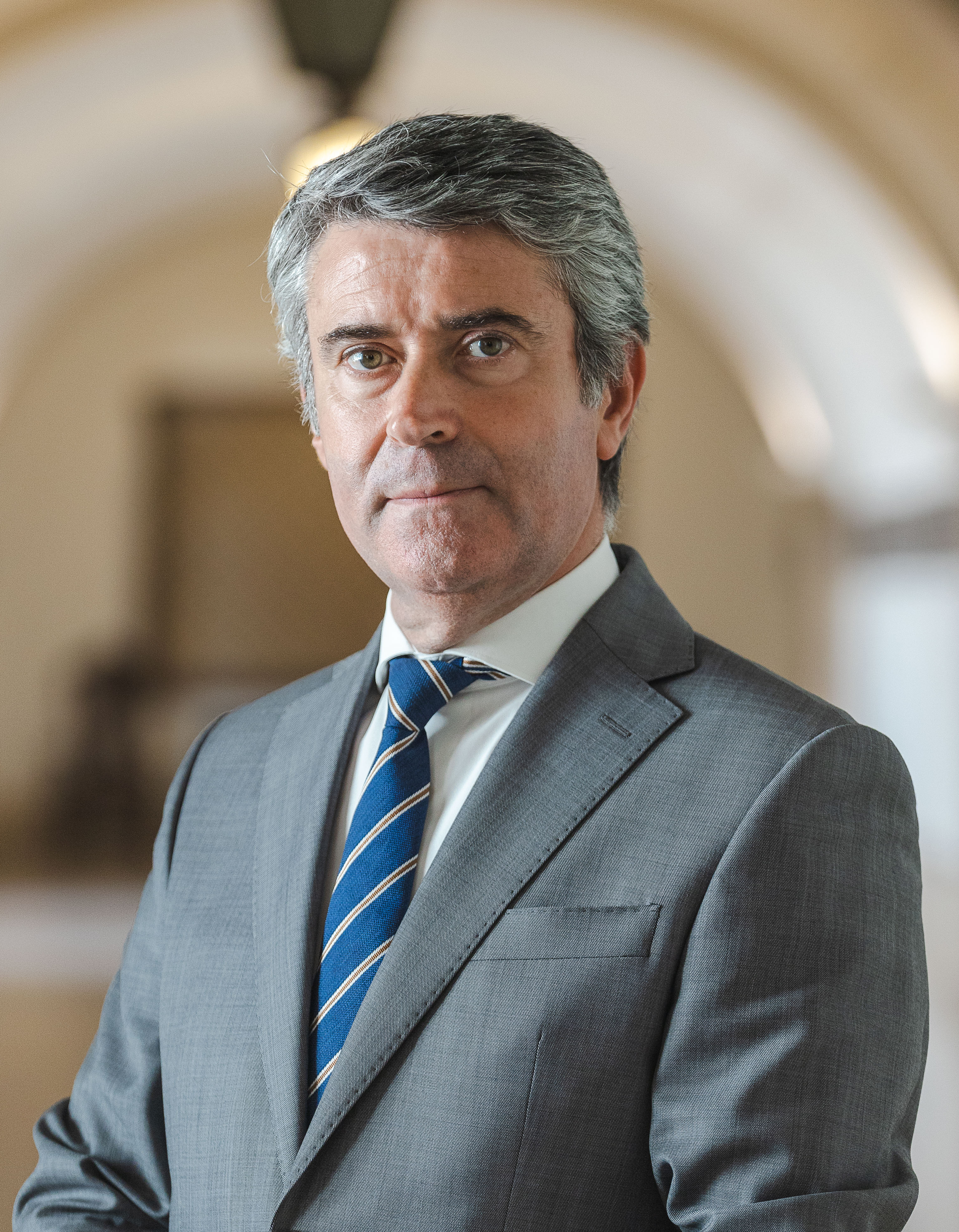
Candidate	José Luís Carneiro
Popular vote	21,443
Percentage	97.1%
Secretary-General before election
José Luís Carneiro
Elected Secretary-General
José Luís Carneiro

The 2026 Portuguese Socialist Party leadership election was held on 13 and 14 March 2026 to elect a new Secretary-General of the Socialist Party. This election was called after concerns about the validity of the previous ballot, since that election was only to fill the rest of Pedro Nuno Santos' term, that expired in early 2026.

José Luís Carneiro announced his candidacy for a second term as Secretary-general on the election night of the first round of the 2026 presidential election. Despite pressures from Duarte Cordeiro and other hypothetical candidates, Carneiro was the sole candidate for the party's leadership, being elected with 97.1% of the votes.

== Candidates ==
=== Declared ===
Name	Born	Experience	Announcement date	Ref.
José Luís Carneiro	4 October 1971 (age 54); Baião	Secretary-general of the Socialist Party (since 2025); Member of Parliament for Braga (since 2024); Minister of Internal Administration (2022–2024); Deputy Secretary-general of the Socialist Party (2019–2022); Secretary of State for Portuguese Communities (2015–2019); Mayor of Baião (2005–2015); Member of Parliament for Porto (2005; 2015–2022)	18 January 2026	

=== Declined ===
- Duarte Cordeiro – former Minister of the Environment (2022–2024)

== Results ==
Summary of the March 2026 PS leadership election results
Candidate	13–14 March 2026	
Candidate	Votes	%
José Luís Carneiro	21,443	97.13
Total	21,443	
Valid votes	21,443	97.13
Invalid and blank ballots	643	2.87
Votes cast / turnout	22,076	~55.60
Registered voters	?	
Sources: Official results

Vote share
José Luís Carneiro	97.13%
Blank/Invalid	2.87%
