= Secretary-General of the Socialist Party (Portugal) =

Secretary-general of the Socialist Party
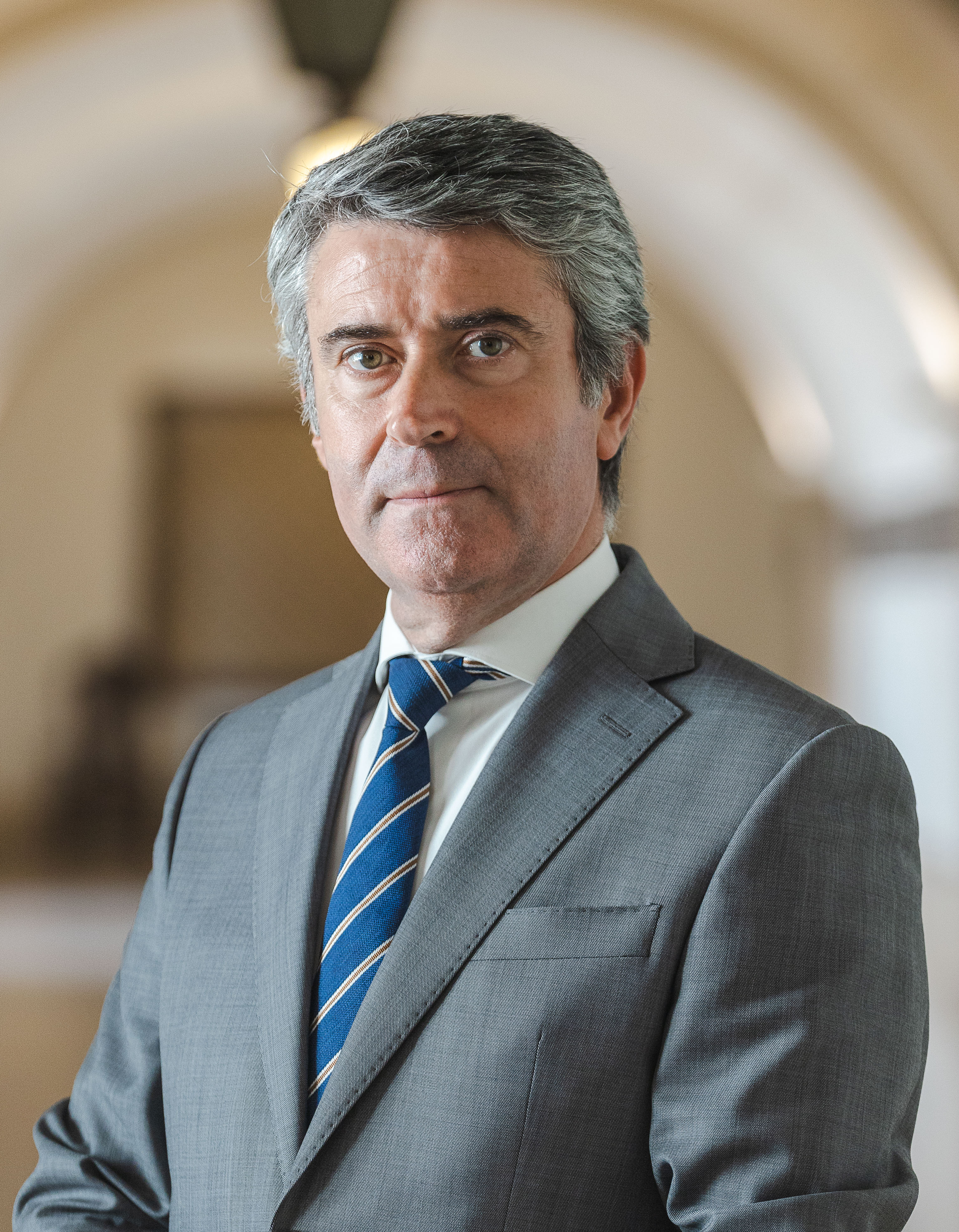
- Incumbent; José Luís Carneiro since 28 June 2025
- Status: Party leader
- Inaugural holder: Mário Soares
- Formation: 19 April 1973
- Deputy: Deputy Secretary-general of the Socialist Party

The secretary-general of the Socialist Party is the leader of the Portuguese Socialist Party. Currently, the position is held by José Luís Carneiro, following his victory in the July 2025 leadership election.

The post of Secretary-general was created in 1973, after the party's foundation in Bad Münstereifel. Its first holder was Mário Soares, who held several important offices such as Prime Minister from 1976 to 1978 and again from 1983 to 1985, and President of the Republic, from 1986 to 1996.

Until 1998, party Secretary-generals were elected by delegate votes in a party congress, but in that same year, party rules were changed and registered party members, with membership fees updated, gained the right to elect the president secretary-general of delegates in a congress, with the possibility of a second round if no candidate obtains more than 50% of the votes in the first round of voting.

To this day, four Secretaries-general of the Socialist Party have become Prime Minister of Portugal: Mário Soares (1976 and 1983), António Guterres (1995), José Sócrates (2005) and António Costa (2015). In addition, Mário Soares (1986), Jorge Sampaio (1996) and António José Seguro (2026), also former Secretaries-general, held the office President of the Republic.

== List of Secretaries-general of the Socialist Party ==
Colour key
(for political parties)
Socialist Party (PS)
Social Democratic Party (PSD)
CDS – People's Party (CDS)
National Union (UN)
Independent
Interim holder

#	Portrait	Name	Constituency	Term in office		Election	Prime Minister	Ref.
#	Portrait	Name	Constituency	Start	End	Election	Prime Minister	Ref.
1		Mário Soares (1924–2017)	Lisbon	19 April 1973	13 June 1985	1973	Marcelo Caetano (1968–1974)	
1		Mário Soares (1924–2017)	Lisbon	19 April 1973	13 June 1985	1973	Adelino da Palma Carlos (1974)	
1		Mário Soares (1924–2017)	Lisbon	19 April 1973	13 June 1985	1974	Vasco Gonçalves (1974–1975)	
1		Mário Soares (1924–2017)	Lisbon	19 April 1973	13 June 1985	1974	José Pinheiro de Azevedo (1975–1976)	
1		Mário Soares (1924–2017)	Lisbon	19 April 1973	13 June 1985	1976	himself (1976–1978)	
1		Mário Soares (1924–2017)	Lisbon	19 April 1973	13 June 1985	1976	Alfredo Nobre da Costa (1978)	
1		Mário Soares (1924–2017)	Lisbon	19 April 1973	13 June 1985	1976	Carlos Mota Pinto (1978–1979)	
1		Mário Soares (1924–2017)	Lisbon	19 April 1973	13 June 1985	1979	Maria de Lourdes Pintasilgo (1979–1980)	
1		Mário Soares (1924–2017)	Lisbon	19 April 1973	13 June 1985	1979	Francisco Sá Carneiro (1980)	
1		Mário Soares (1924–2017)	Lisbon	19 April 1973	13 June 1985	1979	Diogo Freitas do Amaral (1980–1981)	
1		Mário Soares (1924–2017)	Lisbon	19 April 1973	13 June 1985	1981	Francisco Pinto Balsemão (1981–1983)	
1		Mário Soares (1924–2017)	Lisbon	19 April 1973	13 June 1985	1983	himself (1983–1985)	
–		António de Almeida Santos (interim) (1926–2016)	Guarda (1976–1980); Porto (1980–1995); Lisbon (1995–2002); Coimbra (2002–2005)	19 June 1985	13 November 1985	1985	Mário Soares (1985)	
–		António de Almeida Santos (interim) (1926–2016)	Guarda (1976–1980); Porto (1980–1995); Lisbon (1995–2002); Coimbra (2002–2005)	19 June 1985	13 November 1985	1985	Aníbal Cavaco Silva (1985–1995)	
–		António Macedo (interim) (1906–1989)	Porto	13 November 1985	29 June 1986	–	Aníbal Cavaco Silva (1985–1995)	
2		Vítor Constâncio (b. 1943)	Lisbon	29 June 1986	16 January 1989	1986	Aníbal Cavaco Silva (1985–1995)	
2		Vítor Constâncio (b. 1943)	Lisbon	29 June 1986	16 January 1989	1988	Aníbal Cavaco Silva (1985–1995)	
3		Jorge Sampaio (1939–2021)	Lisbon (1976–1987); Santarém (1987–1991); Lisbon (1991–1992)	16 January 1989	23 February 1992	1989	Aníbal Cavaco Silva (1985–1995)	
3		Jorge Sampaio (1939–2021)	Lisbon (1976–1987); Santarém (1987–1991); Lisbon (1991–1992)	16 January 1989	23 February 1992	1990	Aníbal Cavaco Silva (1985–1995)	
4		António Guterres (b. 1949)	Castelo Branco	23 February 1992	19 January 2002	1992	Aníbal Cavaco Silva (1985–1995)	
4		António Guterres (b. 1949)	Castelo Branco	23 February 1992	19 January 2002	1992	himself (1995–2002)	
4		António Guterres (b. 1949)	Castelo Branco	23 February 1992	19 January 2002	1999	himself (1995–2002)	
4		António Guterres (b. 1949)	Castelo Branco	23 February 1992	19 January 2002	2001	himself (1995–2002)	
5		Eduardo Ferro Rodrigues (b. 1949)	Lisbon (1985–1987); Aveiro (1987–1991); Lisbon (1991–1999); Leiria (1999–2002); Lisbon (2002–2022)	19 January 2002	27 September 2004	2002	António Guterres (2002)	
5		Eduardo Ferro Rodrigues (b. 1949)	Lisbon (1985–1987); Aveiro (1987–1991); Lisbon (1991–1999); Leiria (1999–2002); Lisbon (2002–2022)	19 January 2002	27 September 2004	2002	José Durão Barroso (2002–2004)	
5		Eduardo Ferro Rodrigues (b. 1949)	Lisbon (1985–1987); Aveiro (1987–1991); Lisbon (1991–1999); Leiria (1999–2002); Lisbon (2002–2022)	19 January 2002	27 September 2004	2002	Pedro Santana Lopes (2004–2005)	
6		José Sócrates (b. 1957)	Castelo Branco	27 September 2004	23 July 2011	2004	Pedro Santana Lopes (2004–2005)	
6		José Sócrates (b. 1957)	Castelo Branco	27 September 2004	23 July 2011	2006	himself (2005–2011)	
6		José Sócrates (b. 1957)	Castelo Branco	27 September 2004	23 July 2011	2009	himself (2005–2011)	
6		José Sócrates (b. 1957)	Castelo Branco	27 September 2004	23 July 2011	Mar. 2011	himself (2005–2011)	
6		José Sócrates (b. 1957)	Castelo Branco	27 September 2004	23 July 2011	Mar. 2011	Pedro Passos Coelho (2011–2015)	
7		António José Seguro (b. 1962)	Lisbon (1985–1987); Porto (1991–1995); Guarda (1995–1999); Lisbon (2002–2005); Braga (2005–2014)	23 July 2011	28 September 2014	Jul. 2011	Pedro Passos Coelho (2011–2015)	
7		António José Seguro (b. 1962)	Lisbon (1985–1987); Porto (1991–1995); Guarda (1995–1999); Lisbon (2002–2005); Braga (2005–2014)	23 July 2011	28 September 2014	2013	Pedro Passos Coelho (2011–2015)	
–		Maria de Belém Roseira (interim) (b. 1949)	Porto (1999–2002); Aveiro (2002–2005); Lisbon (2005–2009); Aveiro (2009–2011); Lisbon (2011–2015)	28 September 2014	22 November 2014	–	Pedro Passos Coelho (2011–2015)	
8		António Costa (b. 1961)	Lisbon (1991–2002); Leiria (2002–2005); Lisbon (2005–2024)	22 November 2014	7 January 2024	2014	Pedro Passos Coelho (2011–2015)	
8		António Costa (b. 1961)	Lisbon (1991–2002); Leiria (2002–2005); Lisbon (2005–2024)	22 November 2014	7 January 2024	2016	himself (2015–2024)	
8		António Costa (b. 1961)	Lisbon (1991–2002); Leiria (2002–2005); Lisbon (2005–2024)	22 November 2014	7 January 2024	2018	himself (2015–2024)	
8		António Costa (b. 1961)	Lisbon (1991–2002); Leiria (2002–2005); Lisbon (2005–2024)	22 November 2014	7 January 2024	2021	himself (2015–2024)	
9		Pedro Nuno Santos (b. 1977)	Aveiro	7 January 2024	24 May 2025	2023	António Costa (2024)	
9		Pedro Nuno Santos (b. 1977)	Aveiro	7 January 2024	24 May 2025	2023	Luís Montenegro (since 2024)	
–		Carlos César (interim) (b. 1956)	Azores	24 May 2025	28 June 2025	–	Luís Montenegro (since 2024)	
10		José Luís Carneiro (b. 1971)	Porto (2005–2022); Braga (since 2022)	28 June 2025	Incumbent	2025	Luís Montenegro (since 2024)	
10		José Luís Carneiro (b. 1971)	Porto (2005–2022); Braga (since 2022)	28 June 2025	Incumbent	2026	Luís Montenegro (since 2024)	

=== By time in office ===
#	Name	Time in office	Duration
1	Mário Soares	1973–1985	12 years, 55 days
2	António Guterres	1992–2002	9 years, 330 days
3	António Costa	2014–2024	9 years, 46 days
4	José Sócrates	2004–2011	6 years, 299 days
5	António José Seguro	2011–2014	3 years, 67 days
6	Jorge Sampaio	1989–1992	3 years, 38 days
7	Eduardo Ferro Rodrigues	2002–2004	2 years, 252 days
8	Vítor Constâncio	1986–1989	2 years, 201 days
9	José Luís Carneiro	2025–present	1 year, 140 days (Incumbent)
10	Pedro Nuno Santos	2024–2025	1 year, 137 days
11	António Macedo (interim)	1985–1986	228 days
12	António de Almeida Santos (interim)	1985	147 days
13	Maria de Belém Roseira (interim)	2014	55 days
14	Carlos César (interim)	2025	35 days

== Deputy Secretary-general of the Socialist Party ==
The Deputy Secretary-general of the Socialist Party is a position created in 2012 to replace the Secretary-general as the representative of the party in the case where the Secretary-general held the office of Prime Minister of Portugal.

#	Portrait	Name	Constituency	Term in office		Secretary-general	Ref.
#	Portrait	Name	Constituency	Start	End	Secretary-general	Ref.
–	Vacant			31 March 2012	5 December 2015	António José Seguro	
–	Vacant			31 March 2012	5 December 2015	António Costa	
1		Ana Catarina Mendes (b. 1973)	Setúbal	5 December 2015	27 October 2019	António Costa	
2		José Luís Carneiro (b. 1971)	Porto (2005–2022); Braga (since 2022)	27 October 2019	9 April 2022	António Costa	
3		João Torres (b. 1986)	Porto	9 April 2022	13 January 2024	António Costa	
–	Vacant			13 January 2024	Incumbent	Pedro Nuno Santos	
–	Vacant			13 January 2024	Incumbent	José Luís Carneiro	
