= 2011 Portuguese Socialist Party leadership election =

Two Portuguese Socialist Party leadership elections were held in 2022:

- March 2011 Portuguese Socialist Party leadership election
- July 2011 Portuguese Socialist Party leadership election
