= 1999 Portuguese Socialist Party leadership election =

1999 Socialist Party leadership election
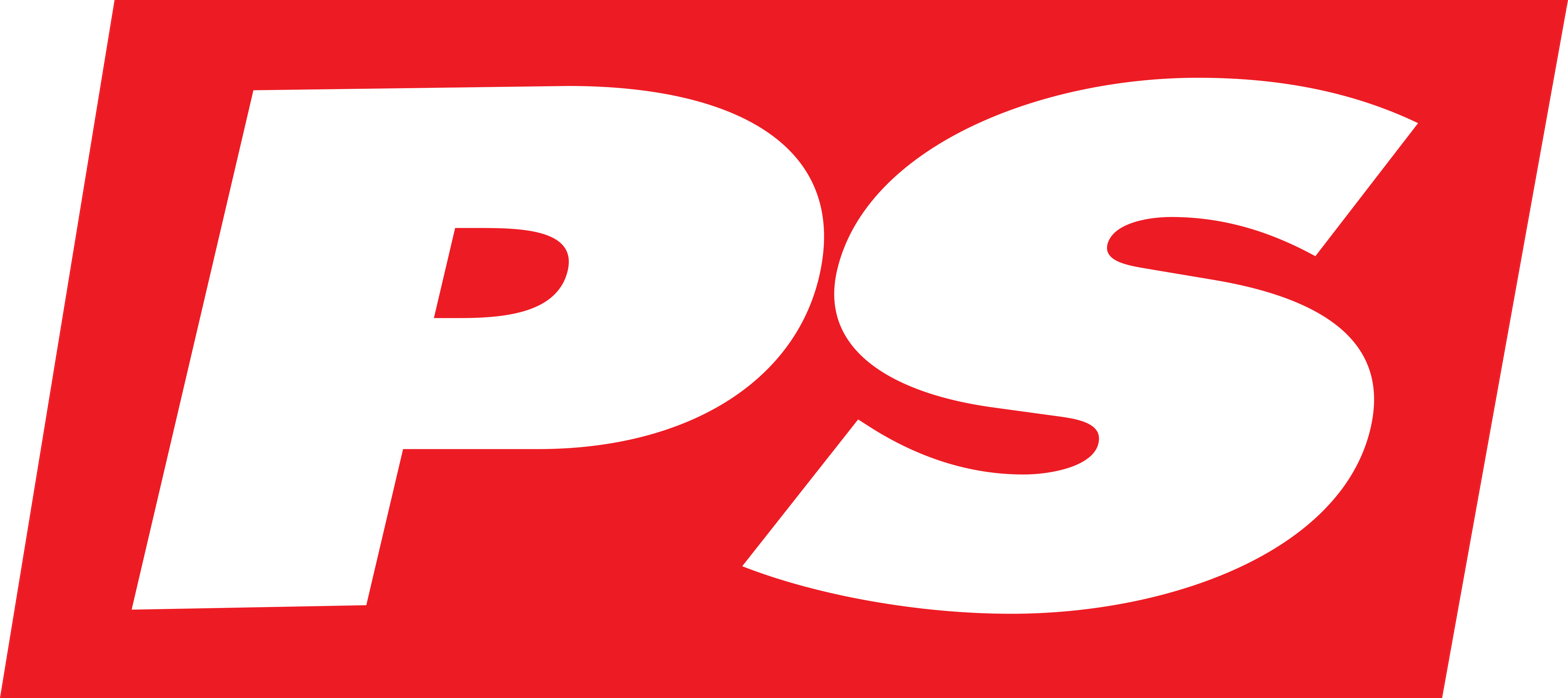
- 17 January 1999
- Turnout: 64.5%
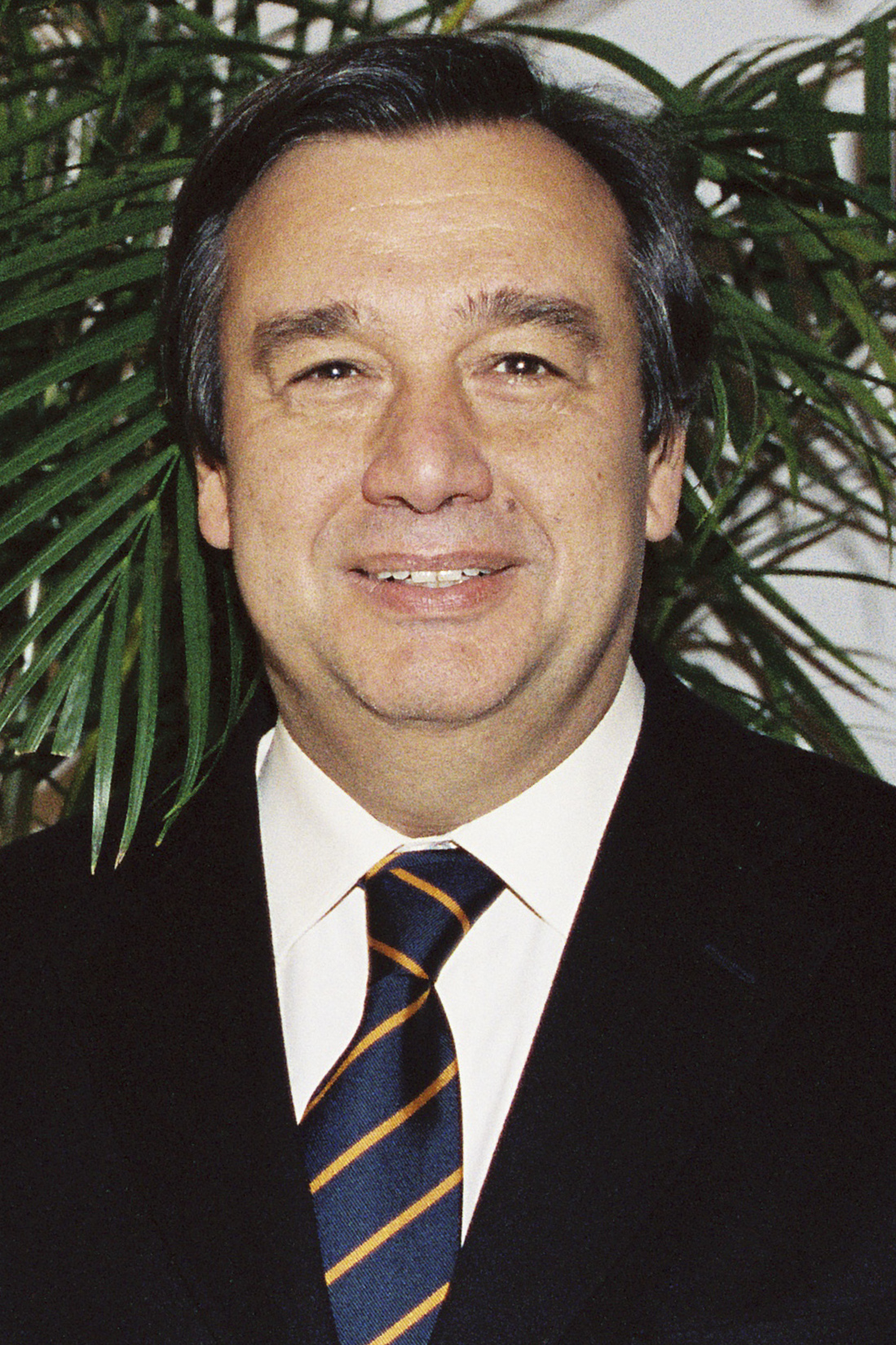
Candidate	António Guterres
Popular vote	~66,100
Percentage	96.7%
Secretary-General before election
António Guterres
Elected Secretary-General
António Guterres

The 1999 Portuguese Socialist Party leadership election was held on 17 January 1999 to elect a new Secretary-General of the Socialist Party. This was the first leadership election open to all party members due to a change in the rules proposed by then leader António Guterres.

After a period of seven years without any party congress or leadership election, Guterres was re-elected as secretary-general with 96.7% of the votes, with only 1.6% of votes against him. He would go on to win the same year's legislative election.

== Candidates ==
=== Declared ===
Name	Born	Experience
António Guterres	30 April 1949 (age 49); Lisbon	Prime Minister (1995–2002); Secretary-General of the Socialist Party (1992–2002); Member of Parliament for Castelo Branco (1976–2002); Leader of the Opposition (1992–1995); Parliamentary leader of the Socialist Party (1989–1991)

== Results ==
Summary of the January 1999 PS leadership election results
Candidate	17 January 1999	
Candidate	Votes	%
António Guterres	~66,100	96.65
Against	~1,100	1.62
Total	~67,200	
Valid votes	~67,200	98.27
Invalid and blank ballots	~1,200	1.73
Votes cast / turnout	~68,400	64.50
Registered voters	~106,000	
Sources: Acção Socialista

Vote share
António Guterres	96.65%
Against	1.62%
Blank/Invalid	1.73%
