= 2021 Portuguese Socialist Party leadership election =

2021 Socialist Party leadership election
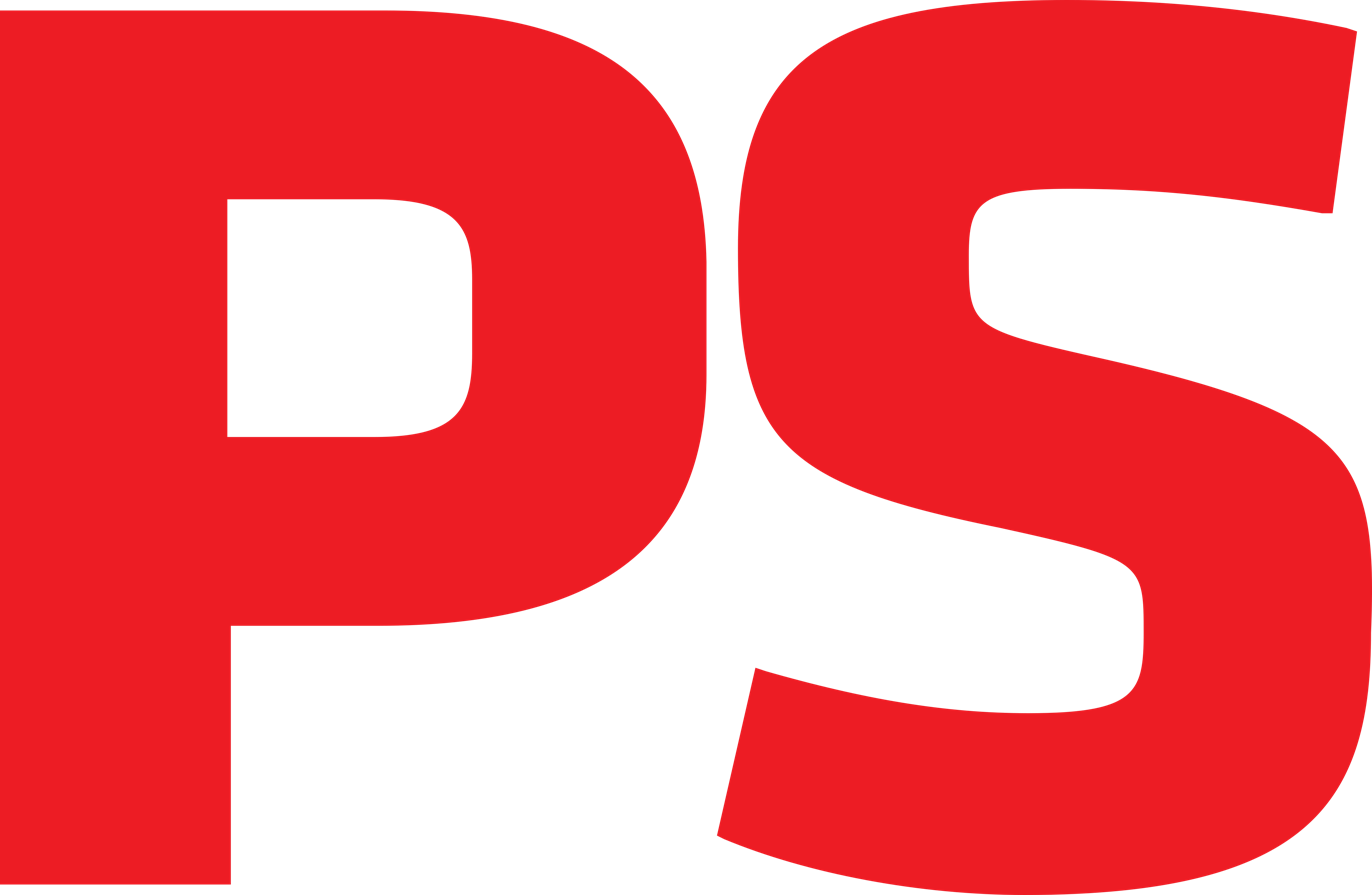
- 20 June 2021
- Turnout: 39.0%
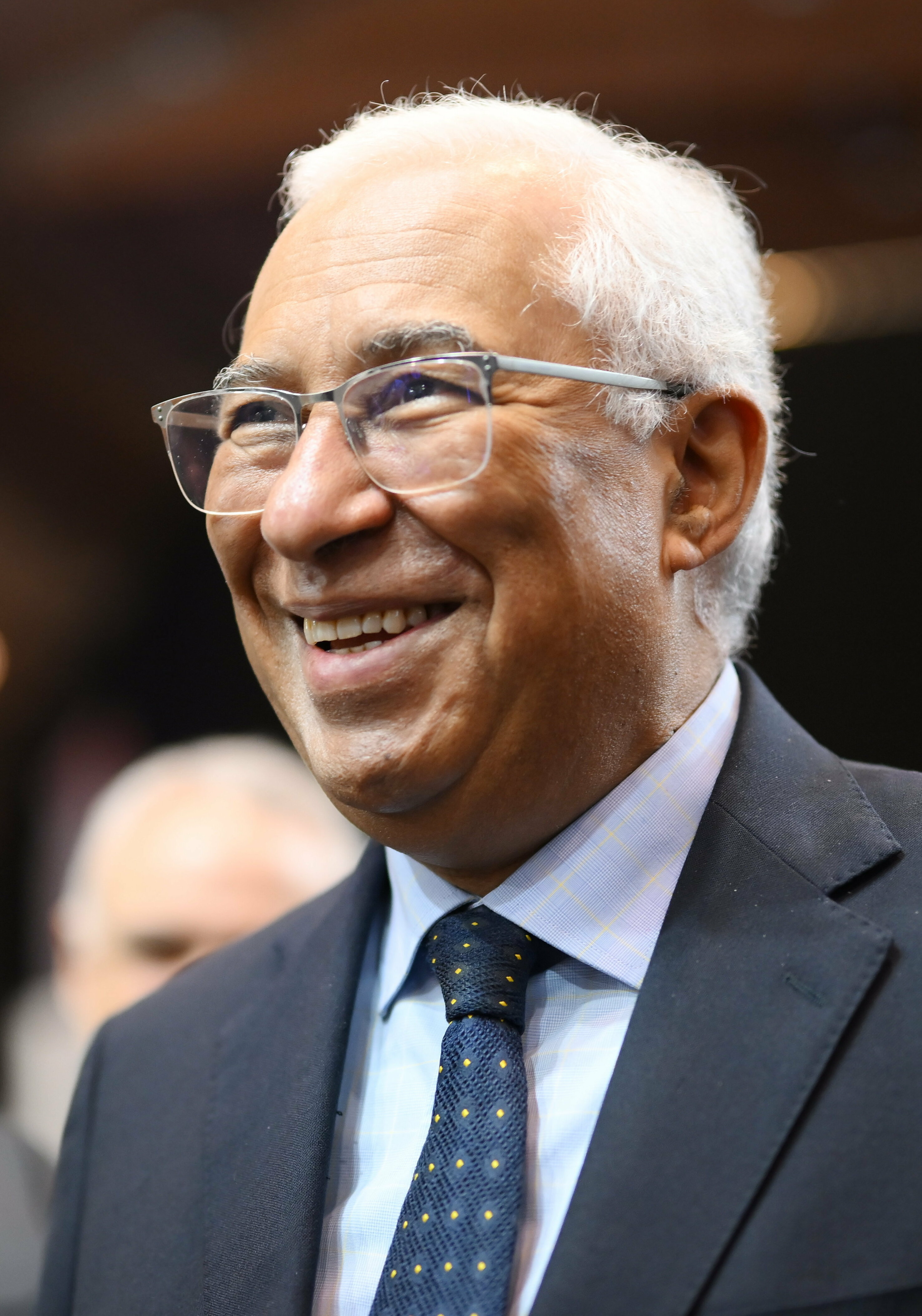

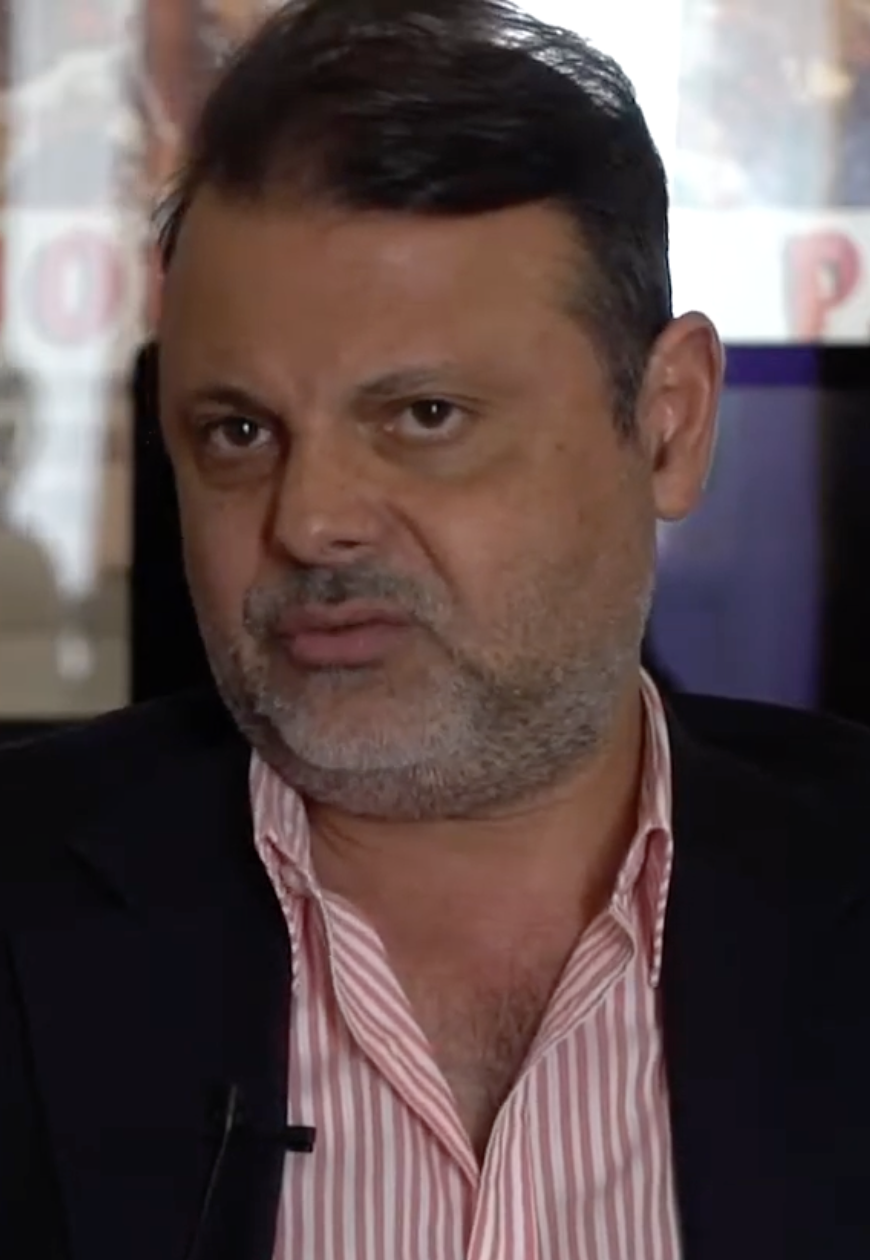
Candidate	António Costa	Daniel Adrião
Popular vote	21,888	1,430
Percentage	91.4%	6.0%
Secretary-General before election
António Costa
Elected Secretary-General
António Costa

The 2021 Portuguese Socialist Party leadership election was held on 20 June 2021 to elect a new Secretary-General of the Socialist Party.

The incumbent Secretaty-general and Prime Minister, António Costa, ran for a fourth term, facing once again Daniel Adrião for the leadership. Costa won with 91% of the votes, while Adrião got 6%.

== Candidates ==
=== Declared ===
Name	Born	Experience
António Costa	17 July 1961 (age 59); Lisboa	Prime Minister (2015–2024); Secretary-general of the Socialist Party (2014–2024); Member of Parliament for Lisbon (2015–2024; 2005–2007; 1991–2002); Leader of the Opposition (2014–2015); Mayor of Lisbon (2007–2015); Minister of Internal Administration (2005–2007); Vice President of the European Parliament (2004–2005); Member of the European Parliament (2004–2005); Parliamentary leader of the Socialist Party (2002–2004); Member of Parliament for Leiria (2002–2004); Minister of Justice (1999–2002); Minister of Parliamentary Affairs (1997–1999); Secretary of State for Parliamentary Affairs (1995–1997)
Daniel Adrião	1 September 1967 (age 53)	Member of the National Commission of the Socialist Party (2016–2025); Candidate in the PS leadership elections of 2016 and 2018

== Results ==
Summary of the June 2021 PS leadership election results
Candidate	20 June 2021	
Candidate	Votes	%
António Costa	21,888	91.38
Daniel Adrião	1,430	5.97
Total	23,318	
Valid votes	23,318	97.35
Invalid and blank ballots	634	2.65
Votes cast / turnout	23,952	~39.00
Registered voters	?	
Sources: Renascença

Vote share
António Costa	91.38%
Daniel Adrião	5.97%
Blank/Invalid	2.65%
