= 2006 Portuguese Socialist Party leadership election =

2006 Socialist Party leadership election
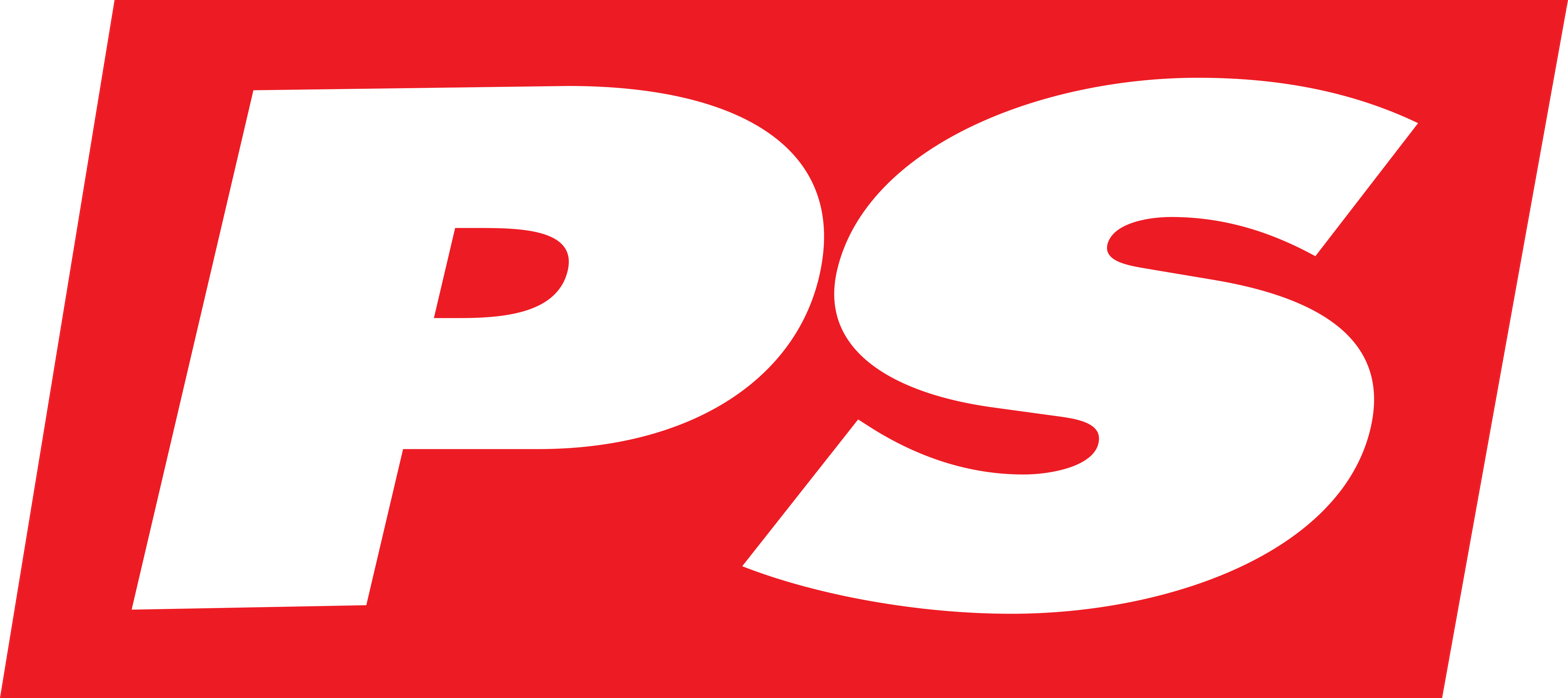
- 27–28 October 2006
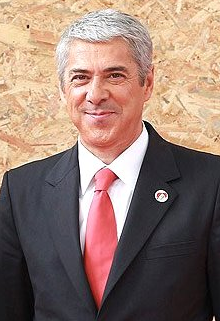
Candidate	José Sócrates
Popular vote	24,713
Percentage	97.2%
Secretary-General before election
José Sócrates
Elected Secretary-General
José Sócrates

The 2006 Portuguese Socialist Party leadership election was held on 27 and 28 October 2006 to elect a new Secretary-General of the Socialist Party.

José Sócrates, elected as Prime Minister in the 2005 legislative election, won a second term as leader of the party, winning 97.2% of the votes.

== Candidates ==
=== Declared ===
Name	Born	Experience
José Sócrates	6 September 1957 (age 49); Alijó	Prime Minister (2005–2011); Secretary-General of the Socialist Party (2004–2011); Member of Parliament for Castelo Branco (1987–2011); Leader of the Opposition (2004–2005); Minister of the Environment (1999–2002); Minister in the Cabinet of the Prime Minister (1997–1999); Secretary of State Assistant to the Minister of the Environment (1995–1999)

== Results ==
Summary of the October 2006 PS leadership election results
Candidate	27–28 October 2006	
Candidate	Votes	%
José Sócrates	24,713	97.19
Total	24,713	
Valid votes	24,713	97.19
Invalid and blank ballots	714	2.81
Votes cast / turnout	25,427	?
Registered voters	?	
Sources: Público

Vote share
José Sócrates	97.19%
Blank/Invalid	2.81%
