= 2009 Portuguese Socialist Party leadership election =

2009 Socialist Party leadership election
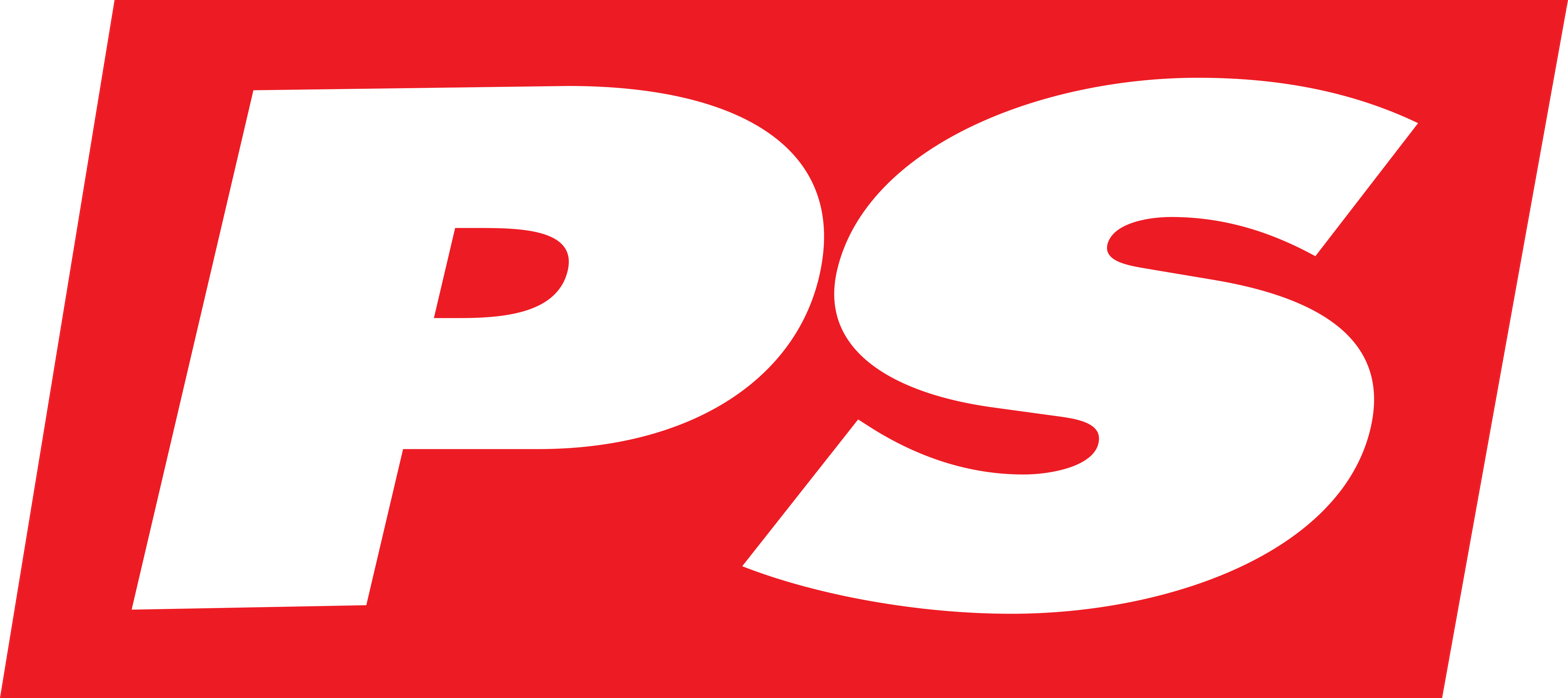
- 13–14 February 2009
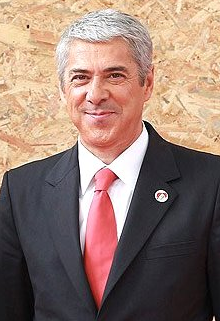
| Candidate | José Sócrates |
| Popular vote | 25,393 |
| Percentage | 96.4% |
Secretary-General before election
José Sócrates
Elected Secretary-General
José Sócrates

The 2009 Portuguese Socialist Party leadership election was held on 13 and 14 February 2009 to elect a new Secretary-General of the Socialist Party.

José Sócrates was unopposed and won a third term as leader of the party, winning 96.4% of the votes. Despite this, several party figures such as Manuel Alegre, José Medeiros Ferreira, Ana Benavente and Henrique Neto, refused to vote, citing the lack of options against Sócrates.

Sócrates would go on to lead the party into that year's legislative election and win, despite losing the absolute majority the party had held.

== Candidates ==
=== Declared ===
| Name | Born | Experience |
|---|---|---|
| José Sócrates | 6 September 1957 (age 51); Alijó | Prime Minister (2005–2011); Secretary-General of the Socialist Party (2004–2011); Member of Parliament for Castelo Branco (1987–2011); Leader of the Opposition (2004–2005); Minister of the Environment (1999–2002); Minister in the Cabinet of the Prime Minister (1997–1999); Secretary of State Assistant to the Minister of the Environment (1995–1999) |

== Results ==
Summary of the February 2009 PS leadership election results
| Candidate | 13–14 February 2009 | |
| Candidate | Votes | % |
|---|---|---|
| José Sócrates | 25,393 | 96.43 |
| Total | 25,393 | |
| Valid votes | 25,393 | 96.43 |
| Invalid and blank ballots | 938 | 3.57 |
| Votes cast / turnout | 26,331 | ? |
| Registered voters | ~29,000 | |
Sources: Expresso

Vote share
| José Sócrates | 96.43% |
| Blank/Invalid | 3.57% |
