= 2001 Portuguese Socialist Party leadership election =

2001 Socialist Party leadership election
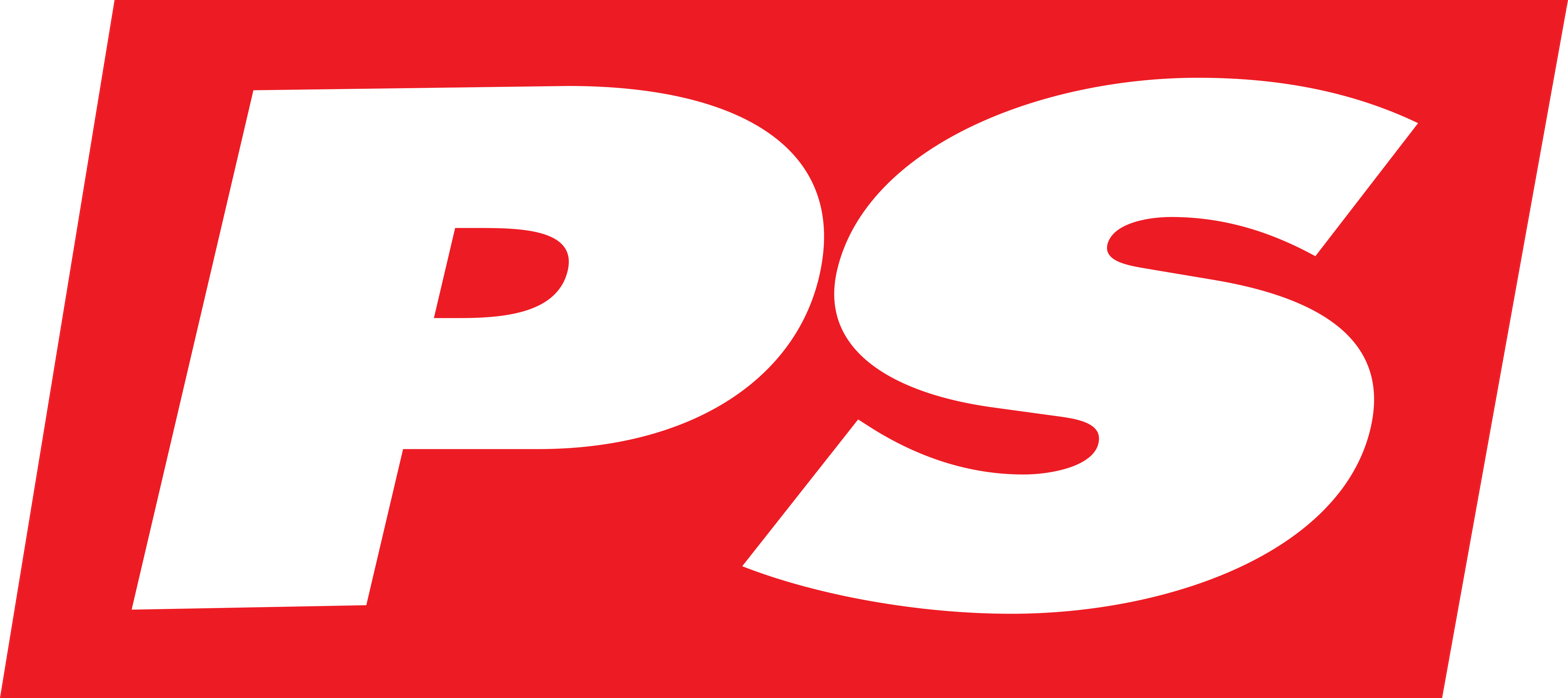
- 21 April 2001
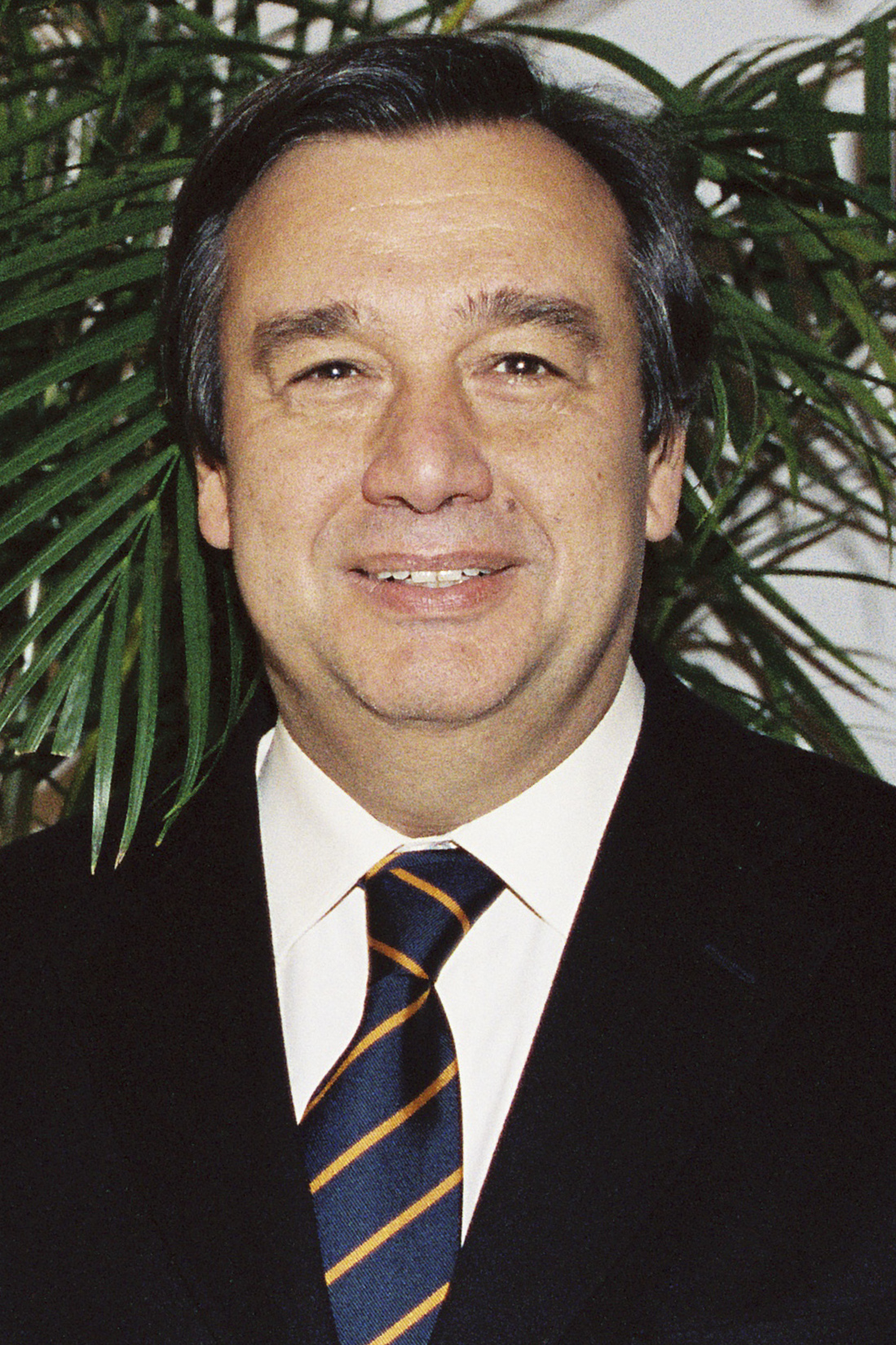
Candidate	António Guterres
Popular vote	51,603
Percentage	96.2%
Secretary-General before election
António Guterres
Elected Secretary-General
António Guterres

The 2001 Portuguese Socialist Party leadership election was held on 21 January 2001 to elect a new Secretary-General of the Socialist Party. Prime Minister António Guterres, who had been the leader of the party since 1992, was re-elected with 96.2% of the votes without any opposition.

Guterres would not serve this full term since, after the disappointing result of the December 2001 local elections, he would resign as leader and as Prime Minister.

== Candidates ==
=== Declared ===
Name	Born	Experience
António Guterres	30 April 1949 (age 51); Lisbon	Prime Minister (1995–2002); Secretary-General of the Socialist Party (1992–2002); Member of Parliament for Castelo Branco (1976–2002); Leader of the Opposition (1992–1995); Parliamentary leader of the Socialist Party (1989–1991)

== Results ==
Summary of the April 2001 PS leadership election results
Candidate	21 April 2001	
Candidate	Votes	%
António Guterres	51,603	96.19
Total	51,603	
Valid votes	51,603	96.19
Invalid and blank ballots	2,042	3.81
Votes cast / turnout	53,645	?
Registered voters	?	
Sources: Acção Socialista

Vote share
António Guterres	96.19%
Blank/Invalid	3.81%
