= António Macedo =

António Macedo may refer to:

- António de Macedo (1931–2017), Portuguese filmmaker
- António Macedo (politician) (1906–1989), Portuguese politician and President of the Socialist Party
- Antônio de Macedo Costa (1830–1891), Brazilian prelate and Archbishop of São Salvador
