= António Mota (writer) =

Portuguese novelist

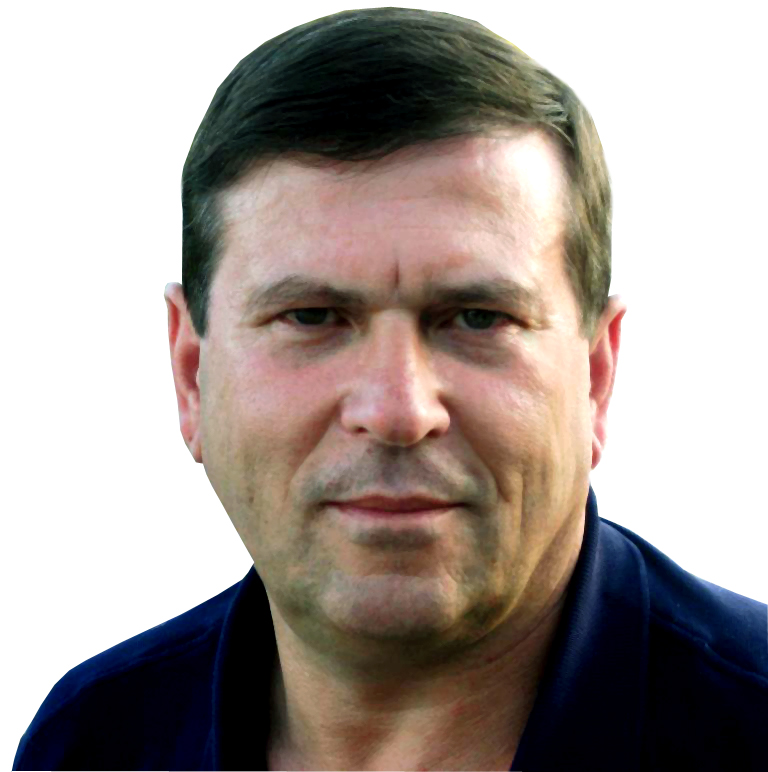
- Born: 16 July 1957 (age 69); Baião, Portugal
- Occupation: Author
- Writing career
- Language: Portuguese
- Period: 1979–present
- Genre: Children's literature
- Website: www.facebook.com/antonio.mota1

António Mota (born 16 July 1957) is a Portuguese writer, known for his works of literature for children and young people.

António Mota was born on July 16, 1957, in Baião, Porto District. He wrote his first book, A Aldeia das Flores in 1979, and published dozens of works. Some of his books are published in Brazil and translated into Castilian, Galician and Serbian.

== Bibliography ==
- A Aldeia das Flores, 1979
- As Andanças do Senhor Fortes, 1980
- Pardinhas, 1989
- Cortei as Tranças, 1990
- Pedro Alecrim, 1990
- A casa das bengalas, 1995
- David e Golias, 1995
- Sal, sapo, sardinha, 1996
- Segredos, 1996
- Os Heróis do 6º F, 1996
- Sonhos De Natal, 1997
- O agosto que nunca esqueci, 1998
- Fora de serviço, 1999
- O príncipe com cabeça de cavalo, 1999
- O velho e os pássaros, 2000
- A galinha medrosa, 2000
- Romeu e as rosas de gelo, 2000
- O livro das adivinhas, 2001
- O livro dos provérbios, 2001
- O nabo gigante, 2001
- Onde tudo aconteceu, 2002
- A galinha medrosa, 2002
- O galo da velha Luciana, 2002
- Pedro malasartes, 2002
- Abada de histórias, 2002
- A gaita maravilhosa, 2002
- O sapateiro e os anões, 2003
- Romeu e as rosas de gelo, 2003
- A princesa e a serpente, 2003
- Filhos de Montepó, 2003
- Maria pandorca, 2004
- O Sonho De Mariana, 2003
- O velho e os pássaros, 2004
- Uma tarde no circo, 2004
- O livro das adivinhas -2º volume, 2005
- O livro dos provérbios- 2º volume, 2005
- Histórias Tradicionais Recontadas Por António Mota, 2005
- De Barcelos Sei Um Saco De Cantigas, 2006, C.M.Barcelos
- O coelho branco, 2006
- A viagem do espanholito, 2006
- Outros tempos, 2006
- O livro das lengalengas 1, 2007
- Se tu visses o que eu vi, 2007
- Os negócios do macaco, 2007
- O livro das lengalengas 2, 2008
- O pombo-correio, 2007
- Ninguém perguntou por mim, 2008
- Lá de cima cá de baixo, 2008
- João mandrião, 2008
- Lamas de Olo, Avenida da europa, 2008
- A rosa e o rapaz do violino, 2009
- A prenda com rodas, 2009
- Histórias da pedrinha do sol, 2009
- A Tenente-Coronel José Agostinho
- A praia dos sonhos, 2010,
- Pinguim, 2010
- A melhor condutora do mundo, 2010,
- Max e Achebiche uma história muito fixe, 2010
- Um cavalo no hipermercado, 2011
- O livro dos trava-línguas 2, 2011
- O primeiro dia de escola, 2011
- Os segredos dos dragões, 2011
- O anel mágico, 2011
- Histórias às cores, 2012
- A arca do avô Noé, 2014
- Maíto, 2014
- O caderno de JB encontrado em Lousada, 2015
- Dicionário das palavras sonhadoras, 2015
- Onde está a minha mãe?, 2016
- A casa da janela azul, 2017
- O gato e a Orquídea, 2018
- Quando o regato secou, 2018
