= A Minha Casinha =

A Minha Casa
- Release poster
- Release date: 14 December 2023 (Portugal)
- Countries: Portugal; France
- Language: Portuguese

A Minha Casinha (lit. My little house or My dear house) is a 2023 French-Portuguese film directed by António Sequeira in his directorial feature debut. The film was presented at the Austin film festival, where it received the Audience award.

== Plot ==
On his 18th birthday, in Autumn, Tomas is getting ready to leave his home in Caldas de Aregos, near Baião, in the Porto region, in Northern Portugal, to go to Britain study medicine. He helps his father making his wine with his sister Belinha while the mother his preparing his favourite dish.

Tomas comes back for Christmas and Belinha tells him she too is about to leave to study fashion design abroad. He then comes back the next year for Eastern to introduce his British girlfriend, who leaves soon after. He only comes back the next Autumn to celebrate his birthday with his family and friends.

=== Note ===
In Portuguese theatres the film was preceded by a message of gratitude by the director and some members of the crew.

== Cast ==
- Beatriz Frazão
- Elsa Valentim
- Miguel Frazão
- Salvador Gil

== Production ==
The film is inspired by The City and the Mountains by Eça de Queirós.

== Release ==
The film was released in Portugal on December 14, 2023.

== Reception ==
The film was described by Observador as "telling the story of a family, the time that passes, what never changes while the son emigrates". "It's a Portuguese film, it's generous, but not as popular as other film that premiered recently, and it runs the biggest risk that can happen to a cinematographic work: being ignored!", commented the Jornal de Noticias.
