= 2002 Portuguese Socialist Party leadership election =

2002 Socialist Party leadership election
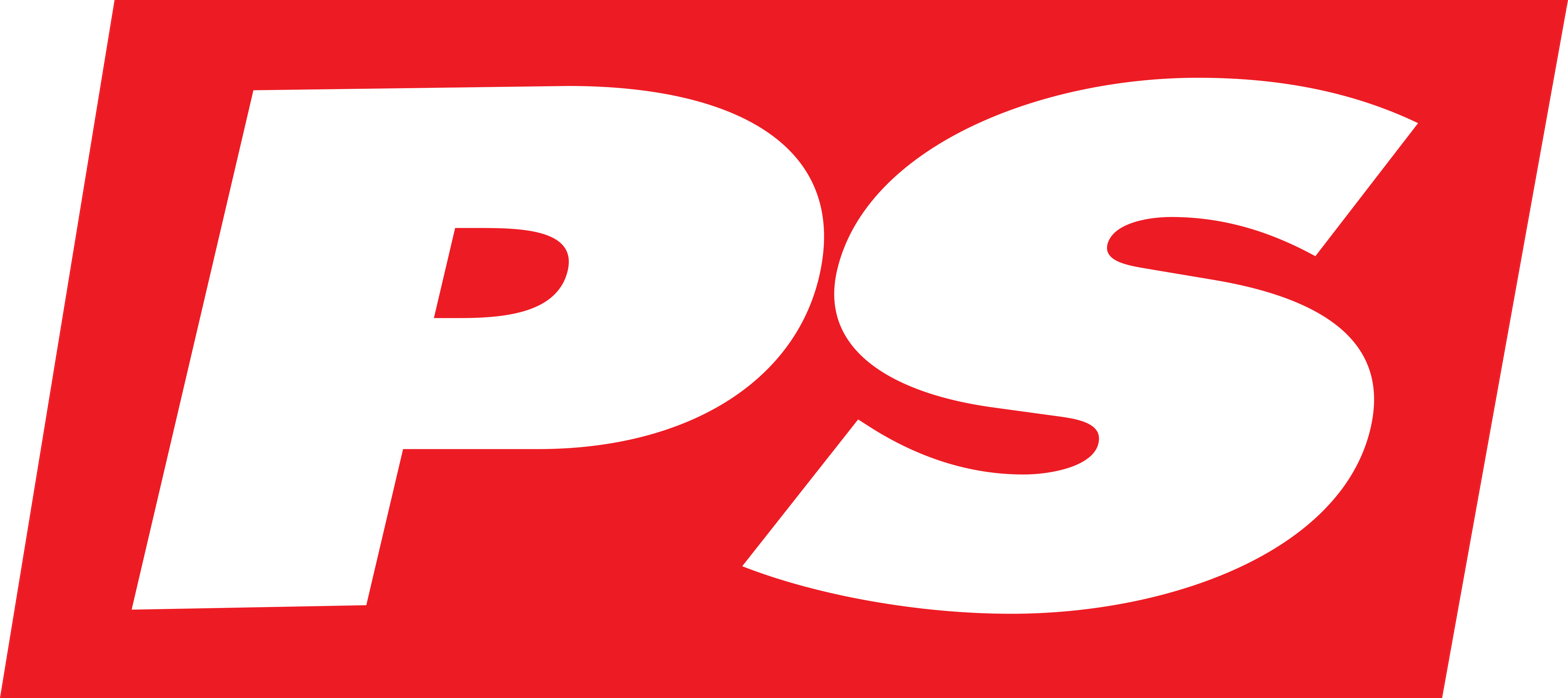
- 18–19 January 2002
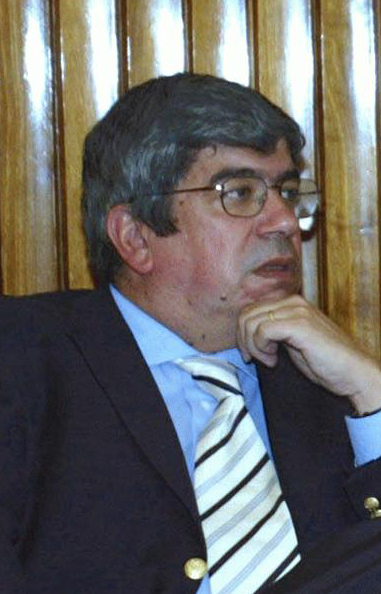
		PP
Candidate	Eduardo Ferro Rodrigues	Paulo Penedos
Percentage	96.5%	2.7%
Secretary-General before election
António Guterres
Elected Secretary-General
Eduardo Ferro Rodrigues

The 2002 Portuguese Socialist Party leadership election was held on 18 and 19 January 2002 to elect a new Secretary-General of the Socialist Party. This election was called after Prime Minister and incumbent leader António Guterres resigned following the disappointing results from the party in the 2001 local elections.

Eduardo Ferro Rodrigues, one of the main names of the Guterres cabinet, was elected in a landslide, beating local Coimbra politician Paulo Penedos with 96.5% of the votes.

Ferro Rodrigues led the party into that year's legislative election, losing to José Manuel Durão Barroso by one of the closest elections in Portuguese history.

== Candidates ==
=== Declared ===
Name	Born	Experience	Announcement	Ref.
Paulo Penedos	1969 (age 32)	City councillor for Vila Nova de Poiares (2001–2005); Chair of the Coimbra Federation of the Socialist Party (1998–2000)	20 December 2001	
Eduardo Ferro Rodrigues	3 November 1949 (age 52); Lisbon	Minister of Social Infrastructure (2001–2002); Member of Parliament for Leiria (1999–2002); Minister of Labour and Solidarity (1997–2001); Minister of Solidarity and Social Security (1995–1997); Member of Parliament for Lisbon (1985–1987; 1991–1999); Member of Parliament for Aveiro (1987–1991)	21 December 2001	

=== Withrew ===
- Jaime Gama – incumbent Minister of Foreign Affairs (1995–2002; also 1983–1985); former Minister of Internal Administration (1978)

=== Declined ===
- António Vitorino – incumbent European Commissioner for Justice and Home Affairs (1999–2004); former Minister of the Presidency and National Defence (1995–1997)
- João Soares – former Mayor of Lisbon (1995–2002)
- José Sócrates – incumbent Minister of the Environment (1999–2002); former Minister in the Cabinet of the Prime Minister (1997–1999)

== Results ==
Summary of the January 2002 PS leadership election results
Candidate	18–19 January 2002	
Candidate	Votes	%
Eduardo Ferro Rodrigues	?	96.45
Paulo Penedos	?	2.74
Total	?	
Valid votes	?	99.19
Invalid and blank ballots	?	0.81
Votes cast / turnout	?	?
Registered voters	?	
Sources: Acção Socialista

Vote share
Ferro Rodrigues	96.45%
Paulo Penedos	2.74%
Blank/Invalid	0.81%
