= March 2011 Portuguese Socialist Party leadership election =

March 2011 Socialist Party leadership election
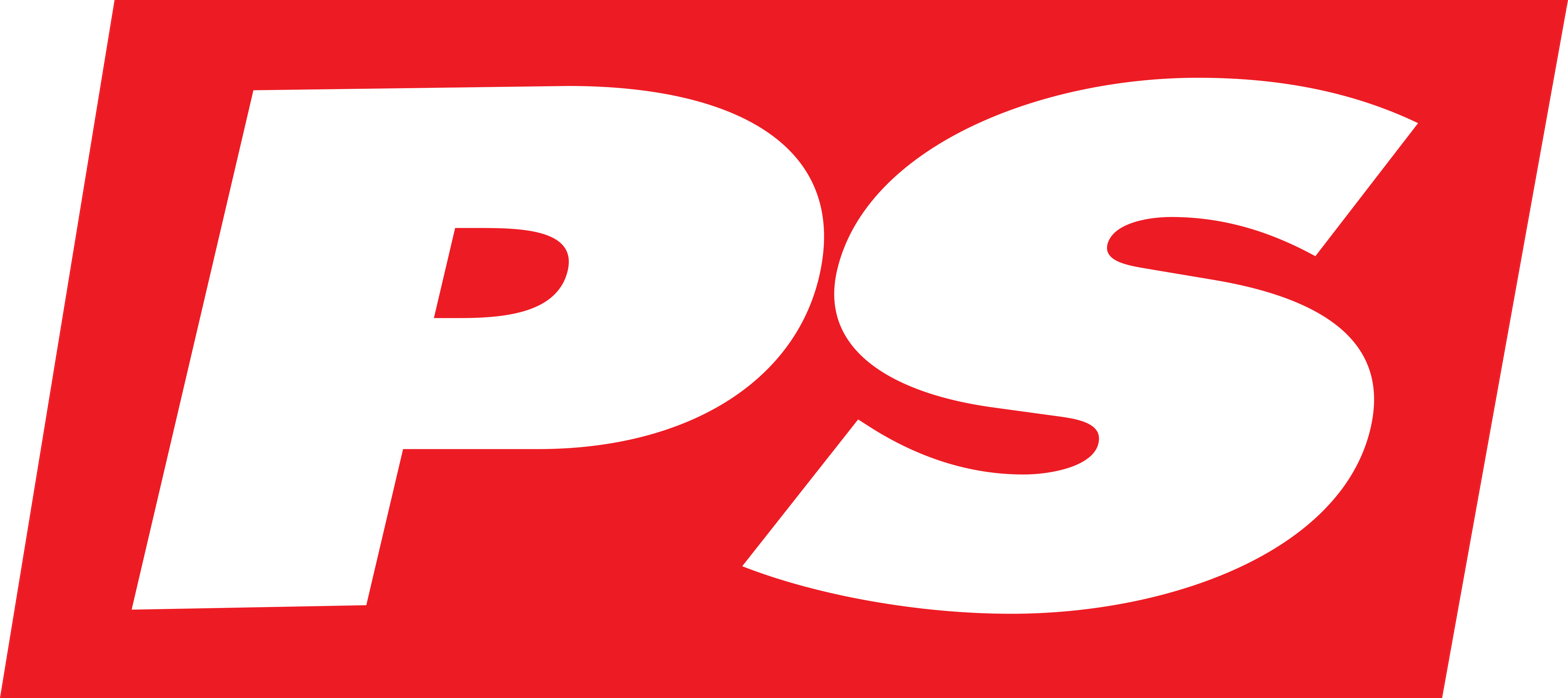
- 25–26 March 2011
- Turnout: 90.0%
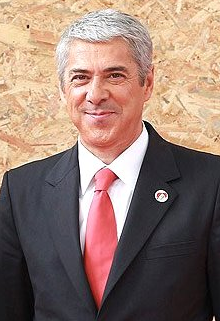
		JSF	AFF
Candidate	José Sócrates	Jacinto Serrão de Freitas	António Fonseca Ferreira
Popular vote	26,713	954	728
Percentage	91.7%	3.3%	2.8%
Secretary-General before election
José Sócrates
Elected Secretary-General
José Sócrates

The March 2011 Portuguese Socialist Party leadership election was held on 25 and 26 March 2011 to elect a new Secretary-General of the Socialist Party.

José Sócrates, leader since 2004, ran for a third term, with the ballot being held just two days after his resignation as Prime Minister, with new elections being on the horizon.

This time, he faced significant opposition, with three other candidates on the ballot: Jacinto Serrão de Freitas, leader of PS Madeira, Fonseca Ferreira, closer to the left-wing of the party, and António Brotas. Despite this opposition, Sócrates was re-elected in a landslide, winning 91.7% of the votes, winning all party federations but Madeira, where Serrão de Freitas won with 74% of the votes.

Sócrates wouldn't fill this full term as, after the June 2011 legislative election and the Socialist Party's defeat, he would resign as leader.

== Candidates ==
=== Declared ===
Name	Born	Experience
José Sócrates	6 September 1957 (age 53); Alijó	Prime Minister (2005–2011); Secretary-General of the Socialist Party (2004–2011); Member of Parliament for Castelo Branco (1987–2011); Leader of the Opposition (2004–2005); Minister of the Environment (1999–2002); Minister in the Cabinet of the Prime Minister (1997–1999); Secretary of State Assistant to the Minister of the Environment (1995–1999)
Jacinto Serrão de Freitas	16 February 1969 (age 42); Funchal	President of the Madeira Federation of the Socialist Party (2010–2011; 2002–2007); Member of the Legislative Assembly of Madeira (2004–2011; 1996–2000); Member of Parliament for Madeira (2005–2009)
António Fonseca Ferreira	1943 (age 67); Trancoso	City Councillor in Palmela (2009–2013); President of the Steering Committee and Regional Development of Lisbon and Vale do Tejo (1999–2009)
António Brotas	22 June 1930 (age 80); Lisbon	Secretary of State for Higher Education and Scientific Investigation (1975–1976)

=== Withrew ===
- Cândido Ferreira – former Chair of the Leiria Federation of the Socialist Party (1991–1995)

== Results ==
Summary of the March 2011 PS leadership election results
Candidate	25–26 March 2011	
Candidate	Votes	%
José Sócrates	26,713	91.67
Jacinto Serrão de Freitas	954	3.27
António Fonseca Ferreira	728	2.50
António Brotas	257	0.88
Total	28,652	
Valid votes	28,652	98.32
Invalid and blank ballots	489	1.68
Votes cast / turnout	29,141	89.95
Registered voters	32,397	
Sources: Official results

Vote share
José Sócrates	91.67%
Serrão de Freitas	3.27%
Fonseca Ferreira	2.50%
António Brotas	0.88%
Blank/Invalid	1.68%
