= José Luís Carneiro =

Portuguese politician (born 1971)

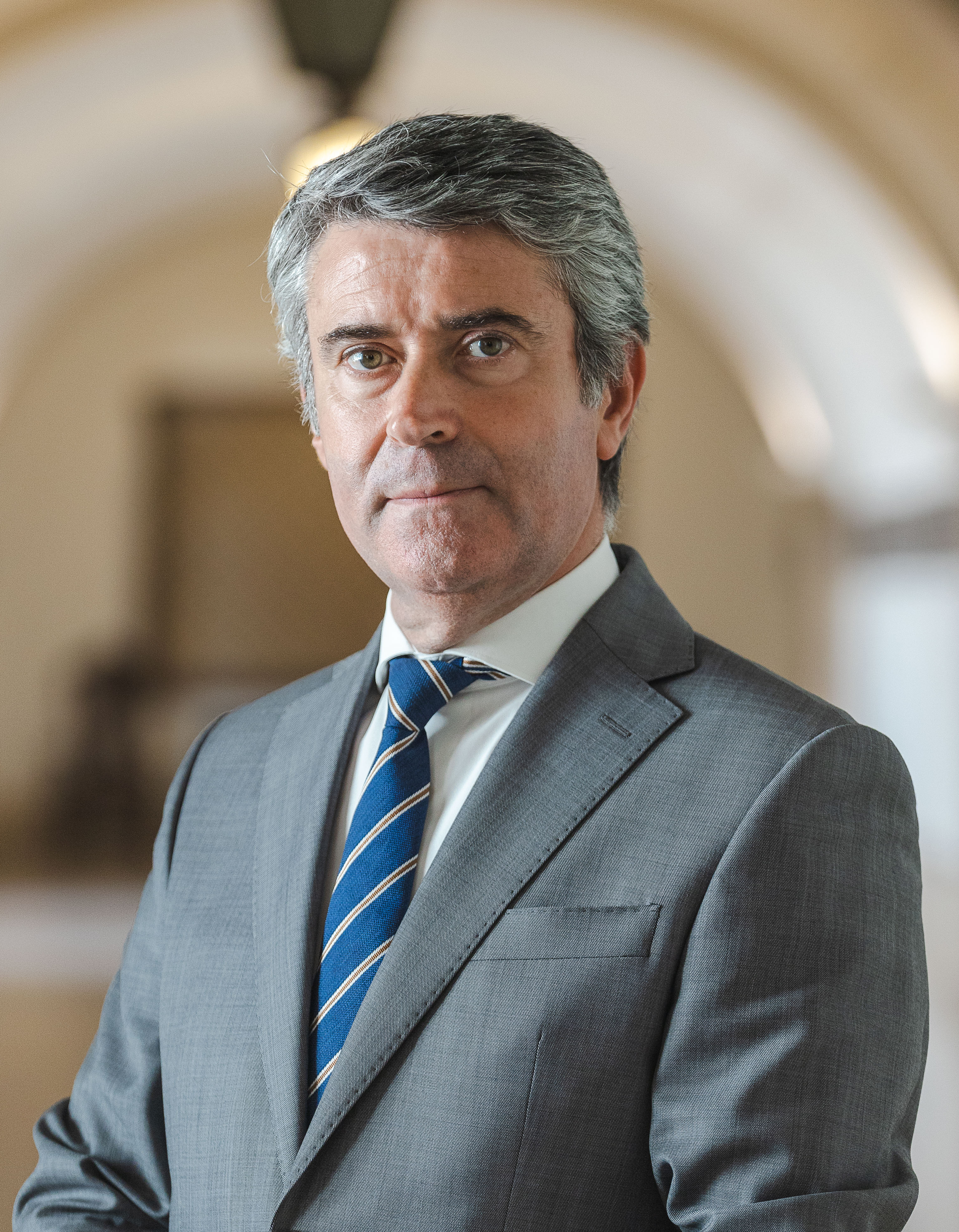
- Carneiro in 2023

Secretary-General of the Socialist Party
- Incumbent
- Assumed office 28 June 2025
- President: Carlos César
- Preceded by: Pedro Nuno Santos

Minister of Internal Administration
- In office 30 March 2022 – 2 April 2024
- Prime Minister: António Costa
- Preceded by: Francisca Van Dunem
- Succeeded by: Margarida Blasco

Deputy Secretary-General of the Socialist Party
- In office 17 October 2019 – 30 March 2022
- Secretary-General: António Costa
- Preceded by: Ana Catarina Mendes
- Succeeded by: João Torres

Secretary of State for the Portuguese Communities
- In office 26 November 2015 – 26 October 2019
- Prime Minister: António Costa
- Preceded by: José Cesário
- Succeeded by: Berta Nunes

Mayor of Baião
- In office 2 November 2005 – 25 August 2015
- Preceded by: Emília dos Anjos Pereira da Silva
- Succeeded by: Paulo Pereira

Member of the Assembly of the Republic
- Incumbent
- Assumed office 29 March 2022
- Constituency: Braga
- In office 25 October 2019 – 28 March 2022
- Constituency: Porto
- In office 23 October 2015 – 26 November 2015
- Constituency: Porto
- In office 10 March 2005 – 2 November 2005
- Constituency: Porto

Personal details
- Born: José Luís Pereira Carneiro; 4 October 1971 (age 55) Baião, Porto, Portugal
- Party: Socialist Party
- Spouse: Maria Goreti Carneiro
- Children: 2
- Education: University of Lisbon

José Luís Pereira Carneiro (born 4 October 1971) is a Portuguese politician from the Socialist Party (PS) and has been the party's Secretary-General since 28 June 2025. He has been a member of the Assembly of the Republic since 2024. He previously served in the government between 2015 a 2024 and in the assembly briefly in 2005 and 2015. Carneiro served as the Mayor of Baião from 2005 to 2015.

== Early life ==
Carneiro was born on 4 October 1971 in Baião, Porto, Portugal. He studied at University of Lisbon.

== Political career ==
Carneiro was first elected as a councillor to the municipality of Baião in the 1997 Portuguese local elections. In the 2005 Portuguese legislative election he was elected for the Assembly of the Republic from Porto, before resigning from that post in order to run for mayor of Baião in the 2005 Portuguese local elections, which he won with 51% of the votes, being re-elected with landslide margins in the 2009 and 2013 local elections.

After 10 years in office as mayor, Carneiro resigned from the post to become Secretary of State for the Portuguese Communities during António Costa's first government (2015–2019). After that, Costa chose him as deputy secretary-general of the Socialist Party. Carneiro served as Minister of Internal Administration in the XXIII Constitutional Government of Portugal from 2022 to 2024.

Polling in 2023 found him to be the most popular minister in the government of Costa. Following Costa's resignation as the prime minister of Portugal, Carneiro was a candidate for the leadership of the PS. On 16 December 2023, he lost against Pedro Nuno Santos in an internal vote. He was the lead candidate in Braga for the 2025 Portuguese legislative election.

Carneiro was reportedly a possible contender for the 2026 Portuguese presidential election but declined to be a candidate.

=== Secretary-General of the Socialist Party ===
After the Socialists' weak results in the 2025 Portuguese legislative election, where the party fell to third place in terms of seats, behind the far-right party Chega, a leadership ballot was called for 27 and 28 June 2025. Carneiro announced his candidacy and was the only candidate on the ballot, resulting in him becoming the next PS Secretary-General. On 28 June 2025, the PS announced that Carneiro had been elected Secretary-General.

== Political views ==
Carneiro has been described as a moderate socialist contrary to his predecessor Pedro Nuno Santos, who is connoted with the PS' informal left faction, and António Costa who was a descendant of the Sampaioist faction. Internally he supported José Sócrates in 2004 and António José Seguro in 2011 and 2014 having served in the national secretariat of the later. In the 2016 presidential election Carneiro supported Maria de Belém Roseira, with whom he has close political relations.

As Secretary-general, Carneiro has positioned PS as a habour for all democrats, democratic socialists, social democrats and christian democrats, having attracted former CDS members to colaborate with the party, namely Filipe Lobo d'Ávila and Francisco Rodrigues dos Santos.

Carneiro has defended the blue economy, the youth, the housing crisis, healthcare, local power reforms and regime pacts with the Democratic Alliance as his priorities.

== Personal life ==
José Luís Carneiro is married to Maria Goreti Carneiro and has two children.

== Electoral history ==
Baião City Council election, 2001

Ballot: 16 December 2001
Party	Candidate	Votes	%	Seats	+/−
PSD	Maria Emília Silva	7,087	48.9	4	±0
PS	José Luís Carneiro	6,754	46.6	3	±0
CDU	Manuel Silva Rodrigues	202	1.4	0	±0
CDS–PP	–	121	0.8	0	±0
Blank/Invalid ballots		344	2.4	–	–
Turnout		14,508	77.17	7	±0
Source: Autárquicas 2001

Baião City Council election, 2005

Ballot: 9 October 2005
Party	Candidate	Votes	%	Seats	+/−
PS	José Luís Carneiro	7,483	50.9	4	+1
PSD	Maria Emília Silva	6,660	45.3	3	–1
CDS–PP	Mário Guedes Negrão	138	0.9	0	±0
CDU	António Gomes	128	0.9	0	±0
Blank/Invalid ballots		297	2.0	–	–
Turnout		14,706	78.12	7	±0
Source: Autárquicas 2005

Baião City Council election, 2009

Ballot: 11 October 2009
Party	Candidate	Votes	%	Seats	+/−
PS	José Luís Carneiro	9,375	66.8	5	+1
PSD	José Carlos Póvoas	4,102	29.3	2	–1
CDU	José Luis Pereira	197	1.4	0	±0
Blank/Invalid ballots		352	2.5	–	–
Turnout		14,026	72.36	7	±0
Source: Autárquicas 2009

Baião City Council election, 2013

Ballot: 29 September 2013
Party	Candidate	Votes	%	Seats	+/−
PS	José Luís Carneiro	8,573	71.4	6	+1
PSD	Luís Miguel Sousa	2,211	18.4	1	–1
CDS–PP	José Carlos Póvoas	498	4.2	0	±0
CDU	Adérito Manuel Vieira	191	1.6	0	±0
Blank/Invalid ballots		532	4.4	–	–
Turnout		12,005	65.40	7	±0
Source: Autárquicas 2013

PS leadership election, 2023

Ballot: 15 and 16 December 2023
Candidate	Votes	%
Pedro Nuno Santos	24,219	60.8
José Luís Carneiro	14,891	37.4
Daniel Adrião	382	1.0
Blank/Invalid ballots	322	0.8
Turnout	39,814	68.65
Source: Diretas 2023

PS leadership election, 2025

Ballot: 27 and 28 June 2025
Candidate	Votes	%
José Luís Carneiro	17,434	95.5
Blank/Invalid ballots	829	4.5
Turnout	18,263	48.9
Source: Results

PS leadership election, 2026

Ballot: 13 and 14 March 2026
Candidate	Votes	%
José Luís Carneiro	21,219	97.1
Blank/Invalid ballots	628	2.9
Turnout	21,848	55.3
Source: Results
