= Soeiro Pereira Gomes =

Portuguese writer (1909–1949)

- Born: 14 April 1909; Baião, Portugal
- Died: 5 December 1949 (aged 40); Lisbon, Portugal
- Occupation: Writer

Joaquim Soeiro Pereira Gomes (14 April 1909 – 5 December 1949) was a Portuguese writer of realist influence and became one of the major names of Portuguese literature of the 20th century. Pereira Gomes is, along with Alves Redol, the biggest name of the Portuguese neo-realist movement. He was also a communist militant and that was always present in his work. The Portuguese Communist Party headquarters (Soeiro Pereira Gomes Building), in Lisbon, is named after him.

== Life ==
Soeiro was born in Gestaçô, Baião, Porto District, the son of two farmers. He studied in the Agricultural School in Coimbra. After finishing his studies, he emigrated to Portuguese Angola, where he worked for one year before returning to Portugal. He then settled in Alhandra, working in the local cement plant, where he developed an intense campaign of cultural dynamization among the workers.

But what really made him remarkable was his work as a writer and his influence upon Portuguese society through socialist realism. In 1939, he published his first texts in the weekly newspaper O Diabo.

Among his major works there are two novels of deep social criticism -- Esteiros and Engrenagem -- and several stories that are an exaltation of Communism and communist militancy.

As a member of the Portuguese Communist Party, Soeiro was member of the Central Committee and was forced to live underground due to the repression of the Portuguese Fascist regime. While living in such dangerous and precarious conditions and the fact he was a heavy smoker, Soeiro developed lung cancer and died of it, being unable to receive the medical help that he needed.

His major work is Esteiros, published in 1941, featuring many drawings by Álvaro Cunhal, dedicated to the 'Sons of the men who were never a child '. It is the story of a lower-class group of boys that, because of their social status, are forced to work in a small brick plant instead of studying. The book is a harsh critique of the dominant social system and its countless inequalities.

He also wrote a novel which was posthumously published: Engrenagem. It displays the changes suffered by an agricultural environment transformed into an industrial one. Differently from Esteiros, in Engrenagem, one may find a strong pamphleteer tone. It could be considered as a result of the close relationship between Gomes and the Portuguese Communist Party at the time he composed the novel.

It is right to say that, along with Alves Redol, Fernando Namora and Manuel da Fonseca, Gomes is one of the fathers of the movement known as Portuguese Neo-Realism.

== Works ==
- Esteiros (1941)
- Engrenagem (1951)
- Contos Vermelhos
- Refúgio Perdido
- Última Carta
