= António Macedo (politician) =

Portuguese politician (1906–1989)

António Cândido Miranda Macedo (29 September 1906 – 9 June 1989) was a Portuguese politician who was the President of the Socialist Party from 1973 until 1986. He was also a Member of the Constituent Assembly and of the Assembly of the Republic from 1975 until his death in 1989.

Born in Valongo in 1906, Macedo studied Law in the University of Coimbra, graduating in 1931. He became a lawyer, having been the lawyer of Agostinho Neto.

He was a founding member of the Socialist Party, having been its first President. He left the office in 1986, being elected as Honorary President of the Party.
