= Baião, Portugal =

Baião
- Municipality
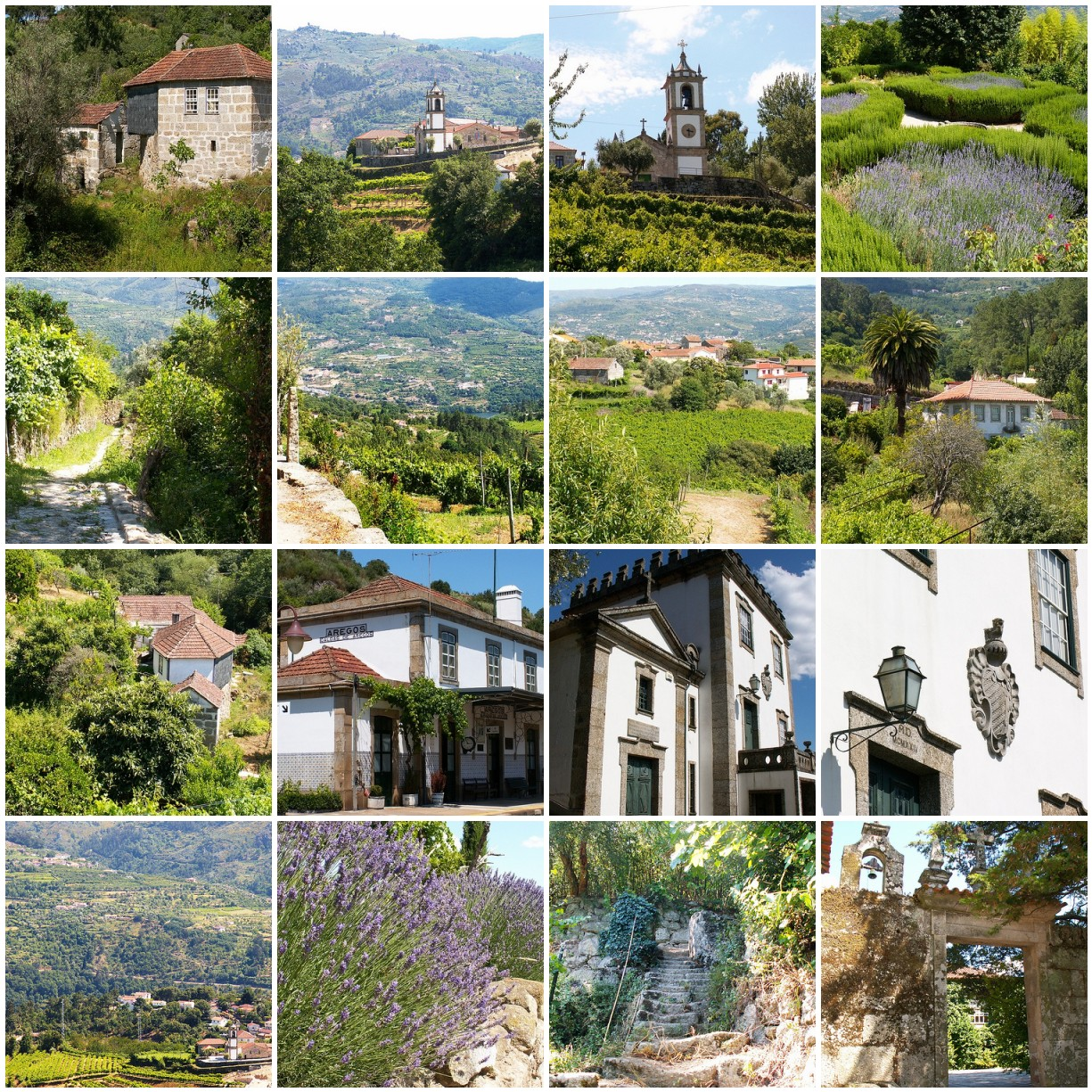

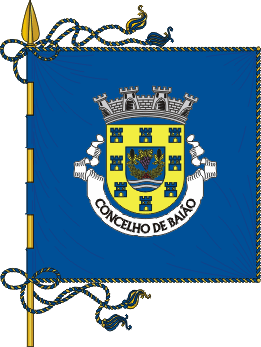
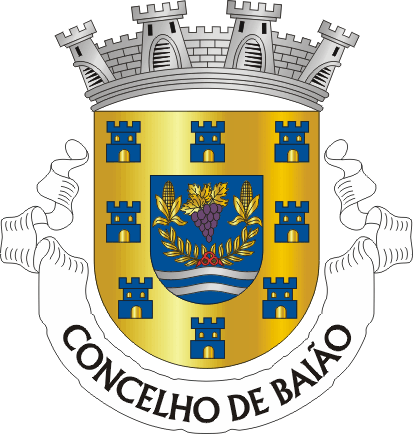
- Flag Coat of arms
- Interactive map of Baião
- Location in Portugal
- Coordinates: 41°10′N 8°02′W
- Country: Portugal
- Region: Norte
- Intermunic. comm.: Tâmega e Sousa
- District: Porto
- Parishes: 14

Government
  - President: Paulo Pereira (PS)

Area
  - Total: 174.53 km^{2} (67.39 sq mi)

Population (2011)
  - Total: 20,522
  - Density: 117.58/km^{2} (304.54/sq mi)
- Time zone: UTC+00:00 (WET)
  - Summer (DST): UTC+01:00 (WEST)
- Website: http://www.cm-baião.pt

Baião (Portuguese pronunciation: [bajˈɐ̃w̃]) is a municipality in Porto District in Portugal. The population in 2011 was 20,522, in an area of 174.53 km^{2}.

Baião received a charter from Manuel I on 1 September 1513.

The present Mayor is Paulo Pereira, elected from the Socialist Party. The municipal holiday is August 24.

Baião is certified by the EarthCheck Sustainable Destinations program.

== Culture ==
In addition to the megalithic ensemble composed of the Aboboreira and Castelo de Matos ranges, which houses the Archaeological Field of the Aboboreira Mountain (CASA) with over five thousand years of uninterrupted settlement, it harbors some unique fauna species throughout the Iberian Peninsula and still preserves between 30 and 40 percent of some animal and plant species existing throughout Portuguese territory. In this context, the Santo André de Ancede Convent (1113 AD) also deserves mention, predating the foundation of the Portuguese nation, whose social and economic influence during the medieval period was felt over an area extending from Porto to Régua.

== Literature ==
In the literary realm, it's worth mentioning that Soeiro Pereira Gomes hails from the parish of Gestaçô, in the municipality of Baião, and that the writer Eça de Queirós drew inspiration from its people, landscapes, and local customs in one of his most renowned works: "The City and the Mountains." The Vila Nova Estate in Santa Cruz do Douro, Baião, is now known as "Casa de Tormes," and the Aregos train station was renamed "Tormes."

António Mota, a leading national writer in the field of children's and young adult literature, widely recognized and awarded multiple times, was born on July 16, 1957, in Vilarelho, in the parish of Ovil. His book "Outros Tempos" (2006), written for adults and illustrated by the Baionense architect Marta Lemos, is an essential work for those wishing to understand the way people in the interior regions lived in the mid-20th century.

== Gastronomy ==
In gastronomy, the municipality of Baião is renowned for the quality of its meats, particularly smoked meats and roasted lamb, as well as its wines. In order to preserve the traditional production methods of these meats and to enhance the quality of Baião wines, the Municipal Council annually promotes two gastronomic initiatives. Visited by thousands of people from various parts of the country, the first, called the "Smoked Meats and Portuguese Stew Fair," takes place in March or early April, and the second, known as the "Roasted Lamb and Oven Rice Festival," takes place at the end of July. Alongside these initiatives, there is a wine and crafts show, with special emphasis on basketry and the famous Gestaçô walking sticks, traditional sweets, notably the Teixeira Biscuit, and traditional music from the region.

== Parishes ==
Administratively, the municipality is divided into 14 civil parishes (freguesias):

- Ancede e Ribadouro (town of Ancede)
- Baião (Santa Leocádia) e Mesquinhata
- Campelo e Ovil (town of Baião)
- Frende
- Gestaçô
- Gove
- Grilo
- Loivos da Ribeira e Tresouras
- Loivos do Monte
- Santa Cruz do Douro e São Tomé de Covelas
- Santa Marinha do Zêzere (town)
- Teixeira e Teixeiró
- Valadares
- Viariz

== Notable people ==
- Soeiro Pereira Gomes (1909 in Gestaçô – 1949) a Portuguese writer of realist influence
- António Mota (born 1957) a Portuguese writer for children and young people.
- Ricardo José Vaz Alves Monteiro (born 1983 in Gestaçô), known as Tarantini, a former footballer with 495 club caps

== In popular culture ==
The 2023 Portuguese film A Minha Casinha was shot and is set in the municipality.
