= Leader of the Opposition (Portugal) =

Leader of the largest party in the Portuguese parliament not within the government

- Líder da Oposição
- Logo of the biggest party in opposition

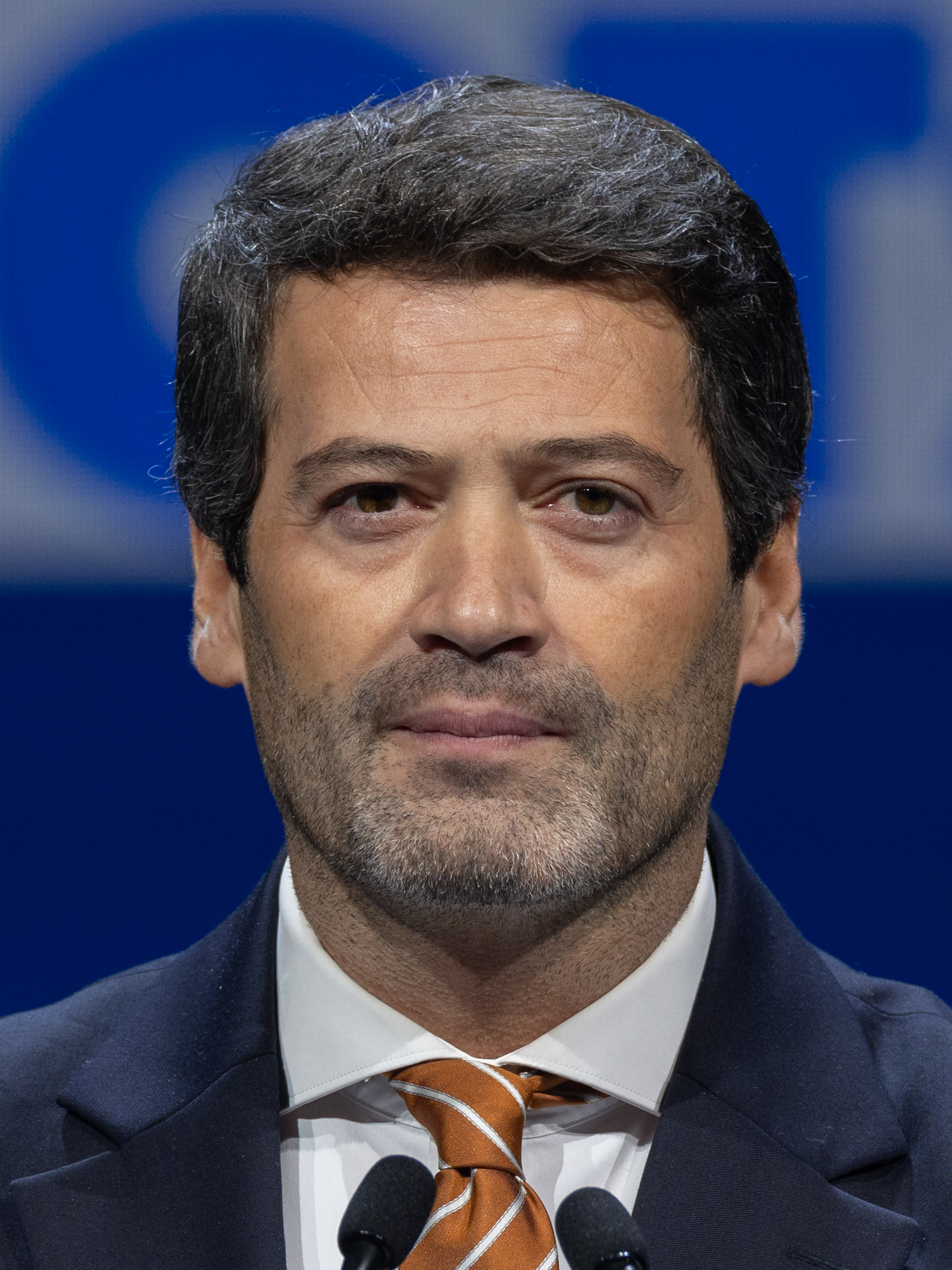
- Incumbent; André Ventura since 3 June 2025
- Term length: No fixed term; While leader of the largest political party not in government
- Inaugural holder: Francisco de Sá Carneiro (of the Third Republic)
- Formation: 23 July 1976
- Salary: €64,450 annually (Only as an elected MP)

The leader of the opposition (Portuguese: Líder da Oposição) is an unofficial, mostly conventional and honorary title traditionally held by the leader of the largest party in the Assembly of the Republic – the Portuguese parliament – not within the government; historically, since the Carnation Revolution of 1974, these have almost always been the Socialist (PS) and the Social Democratic (PSD) parties, with the exceptions of between 1983 and 1985, when the Communist Party was the main opposition during a PS/PSD coalition, and after May 2025 when the opposition leadership was pass on to Chega which surpassed PS.

Currently, the Social Democratic Party (PSD) and the CDS – People's Party (CDS–PP) hold a minority coalition government. The Opposition consists of Chega (CH), the Socialist Party (PS), Liberal Initiative (IL), LIVRE (L), Portuguese Communist Party (PCP), Left Bloc (BE), People–Animals–Nature (PAN) and Together for the People (JPP).

The current leader of the opposition is André Ventura, Chega leader, since 3 June 2025, after his party surpassed Socialist Party (PS) in number of seats in the 2025 legislative election.

== Role ==
Due to its workings being based mostly on custom and convention, the leader of the opposition has a small official role, even though it is legally, honorifically, and nominally recognised. Law No. 40/2006, that establishes the order of precedence of public authorities in general official acts, places the leader of the opposition in eighth place in the list of precedences, only behind the President of the Republic, the legislative speaker, the sitting Prime Minister of Portugal, the presidents of the Supreme Court and the Constitutional Court, the presidents of the Supreme Administrative Court and the Court of Auditors, former presidents of the Republic, and sitting government ministers.

Even though the leader of the opposition is not entitled to a specific salary aside from the one they may have by reason of holding a public office on their own – such as that of a member of parliament (MP) – the officeholder usually receives much more attention from the media in parliamentary sessions and activities, as well as being the first to question the Prime Minister in debates. It is not, however, required for a leader of the opposition to hold a seat in the Assembly of the Republic.

== List of leaders of the opposition ==
Colour key
(for political parties)
Socialist Party (PS)
Social Democratic Party (PSD)
Portuguese Communist Party (PCP)
CDS – People's Party (CDS)
Chega (CH)
Independent
Acting holder

Date (Start of term)	Main opposition party	Party Leader	Prime Minister (Term)
23 July 1976	PSD	Francisco Sá Carneiro	Mário Soares (1976–1978)
16 April 1977	PSD	António de Sousa Franco	Mário Soares (1976–1978)
15 April 1978	PSD	José Menéres Pimentel	Mário Soares (1976–1978)
2 July 1978	PSD	Francisco Sá Carneiro	Mário Soares (1976–1978)
29 August 1978	PS	Mário Soares	Alfredo Nobre da Costa (1978)
29 August 1978	PS	Mário Soares	Carlos Mota Pinto (1978–1979)
29 August 1978	PS	Mário Soares	Maria de Lourdes Pintasilgo (1979–1980)
29 August 1978	PS	Mário Soares	Francisco Sá Carneiro (1980)
29 August 1978	PS	Mário Soares	Diogo Freitas do Amaral (acting) (1980–1981)
29 August 1978	PS	Mário Soares	Francisco Pinto Balsemão (1981–1983)
9 June 1983	PCP	Álvaro Cunhal	Mário Soares (1983–1985)
6 November 1985	PS	António de Almeida Santos (acting)	Aníbal Cavaco Silva (1985–1995)
13 November 1985	PS	António Macedo (acting)	Aníbal Cavaco Silva (1985–1995)
29 June 1986	PS	Vítor Constâncio	Aníbal Cavaco Silva (1985–1995)
6 November 1988	PS	Jorge Sampaio	Aníbal Cavaco Silva (1985–1995)
23 February 1992	PS	António Guterres	Aníbal Cavaco Silva (1985–1995)
28 October 1995	PSD	Fernando Nogueira	António Guterres (1995–2002)
29 March 1996	PSD	Marcelo Rebelo de Sousa	António Guterres (1995–2002)
1 May 1999	PSD	José Manuel Durão Barroso	António Guterres (1995–2002)
6 April 2002	PS	Eduardo Ferro Rodrigues	José Manuel Durão Barroso (2002–2004)
6 April 2002	PS	Eduardo Ferro Rodrigues	Pedro Santana Lopes (2004–2005)
24 September 2004	PS	José Sócrates	Pedro Santana Lopes (2004–2005)
12 March 2005	PSD	Pedro Santana Lopes	José Sócrates (2005–2011)
10 April 2005	PSD	Luís Marques Mendes	José Sócrates (2005–2011)
28 September 2007	PSD	Luís Filipe Menezes	José Sócrates (2005–2011)
31 May 2008	PSD	Manuela Ferreira Leite	José Sócrates (2005–2011)
26 March 2010	PSD	Pedro Passos Coelho	José Sócrates (2005–2011)
21 June 2011	PS	José Sócrates	Pedro Passos Coelho (2011–2015)
23 July 2011	PS	António José Seguro	Pedro Passos Coelho (2011–2015)
28 September 2014	PS	Maria de Belém Roseira (acting)	Pedro Passos Coelho (2011–2015)
22 November 2014	PS	António Costa	Pedro Passos Coelho (2011–2015)
26 November 2015	PSD	Pedro Passos Coelho	António Costa (2015–2024)
18 February 2018	PSD	Rui Rio	António Costa (2015–2024)
3 July 2022	PSD	Luís Montenegro	António Costa (2015–2024)
2 April 2024	PS	Pedro Nuno Santos	Luís Montenegro (2024–present)
24 May 2025	PS	Carlos César (acting)	Luís Montenegro (2024–present)
3 June 2025	CH	André Ventura	Luís Montenegro (2024–present)

== Leaders of the opposition by time in office ==
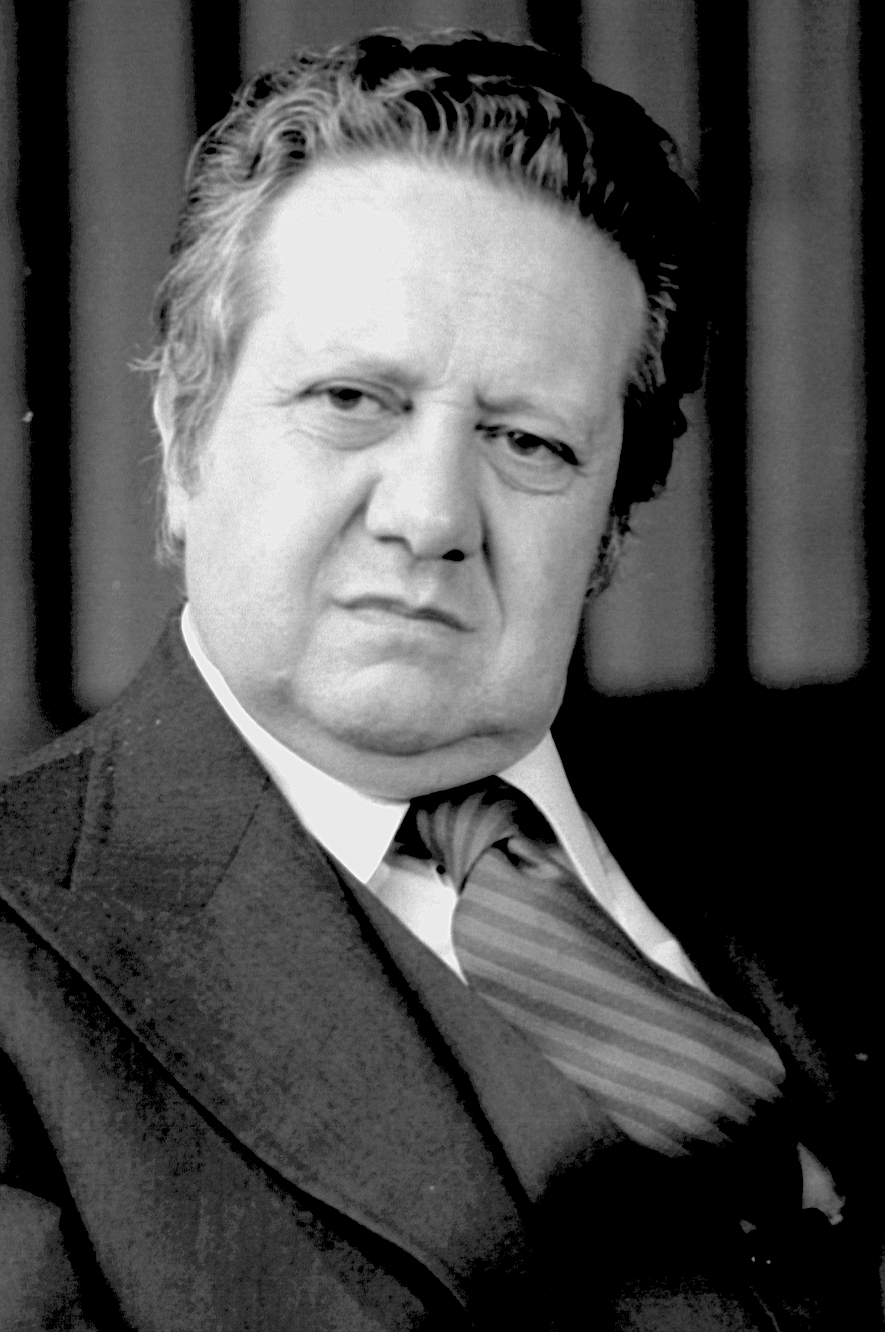
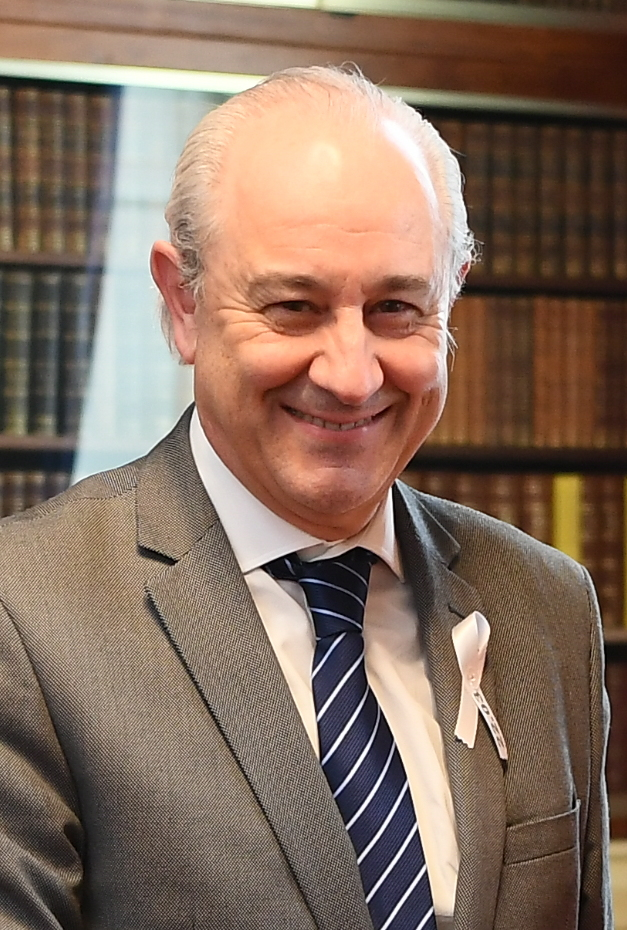
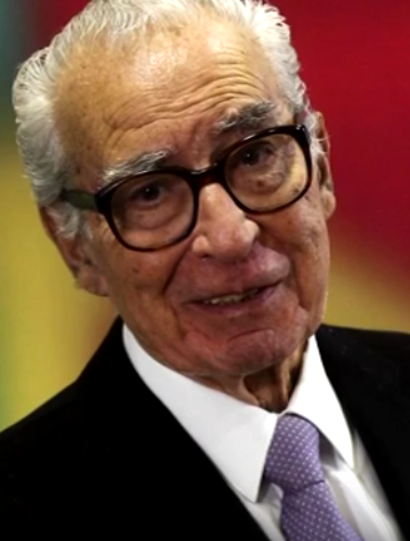
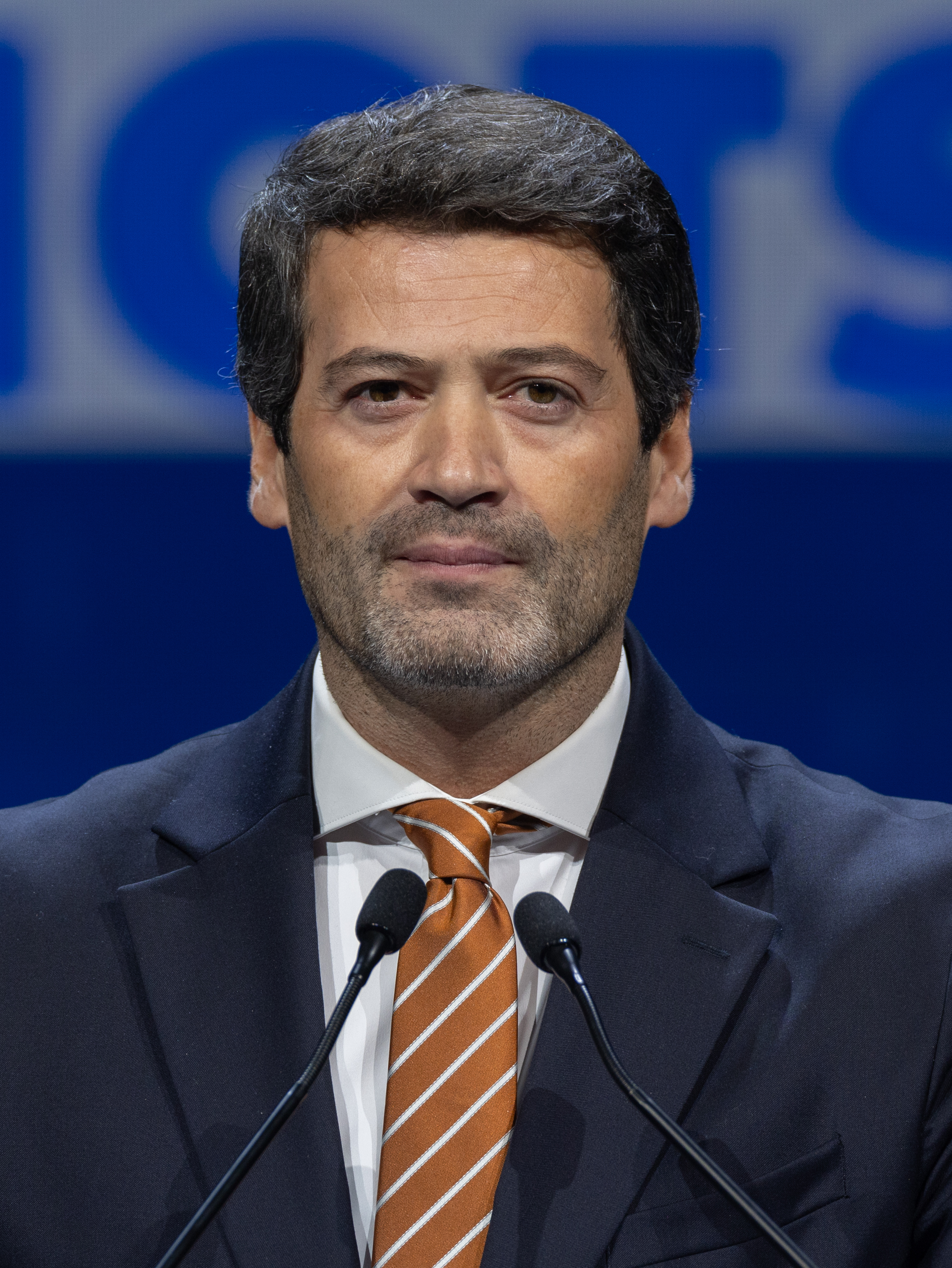
- Top left: Mário Soares was the longest serving leader of the opposition.
- Top right: Rui Rio was the longest serving leader of the opposition who didn't become Prime Minister.
- Bottom left: António de Almeida Santos was the shortest serving leader of the opposition.
- Bottom right: André Ventura is the incumbent leader of the opposition.

Rank	Leader	Party	Term in office	Terms	General elections lost
1	Mário Soares	Socialist	4 years, 284 days	1	2: 1979; 1980
2	Rui Rio	Social Democratic	4 years, 135 days	1	2: 2019; 2022
3	António Guterres	Socialist	3 years, 247 days	1	0
4	Pedro Passos Coelho	Social Democratic	3 years, 171 days	2	0
5	António José Seguro	Socialist	3 years, 122 days	1	0
6	Jorge Sampaio	Socialist	3 years, 109 days	1	1: 1991
7	Marcelo Rebelo de Sousa	Social Democratic	3 years, 33 days	1	0
8	José Manuel Durão Barroso	Social Democratic	2 years, 340 days	1	1: 1999
9	Eduardo Ferro Rodrigues	Socialist	2 years, 171 days	1	1: 2002
9	Luís Marques Mendes	Social Democratic	2 years, 171 days	1	0
10	Álvaro Cunhal	Communist	2 years, 150 days	1	7: 1976; 1979; 1980; 1983; 1985; 1987; 1991
11	Vítor Constâncio	Socialist	2 years, 130 days	1	1: 1987
12	Francisco Sá Carneiro	Social Democratic	2 years, 87 days	2	1: 1976
13	Manuela Ferreira Leite	Social Democratic	1 year, 299 days	1	1: 2009
14	Luís Montenegro	Social Democratic	1 year, 267 days	1	0
15	André Ventura	Chega	1 year, 127 days (Incumbent)	1	4: 2019; 2022; 2024; 2025
16	Pedro Nuno Santos	Socialist	1 year, 52 days	1	2: 2024; 2025
17	António Costa	Socialist	1 year, 4 days	1	1: 2015
18	António de Sousa Franco	Social Democratic	364 days	1	0
19	Luís Filipe Menezes	Social Democratic	246 days	1	0
20	António Macedo (acting)	Socialist	228 days	1	0
21	José Sócrates	Socialist	201 days	2	1: 2011
22	Fernando Nogueira	Social Democratic	153 days	1	1: 1995
23	José Menéres Pimentel	Social Democratic	78 days	1	0
24	Maria de Belém Roseira (acting)	Socialist	55 days	1	0
25	Pedro Santana Lopes	Social Democratic	29 days	1	1: 2005
26	Carlos César (acting)	Socialist	10 days	1	0
27	António de Almeida Santos (acting)	Socialist	7 days	1	1: 1985

=== By party ===
Rank	Party	Term in office	Leaders	Terms
1	Social Democratic	24 years, 183 days	13	15
2	Socialist	23 years, 162 days	13	14
3	Communist	2 years, 150 days	1	1
4	Chega	1 year, 127 days (incumbent)	1	1

== See also ==
- Prime Minister of Portugal
- List of political parties in Portugal
- Assembly of the Republic
