= 14th Legislature of the Third Portuguese Republic =

←	13th Legislature	15th Legislature	→

Overview
- Legislative body: Assembly of the Republic
- Meeting place: Palace of Saint Benedict
- Term: 25 October 2019 – 28 March 2022
- Election: 6 October 2019
- Government: XXII Constitutional Government
- Website: parlamento.pt

Deputies
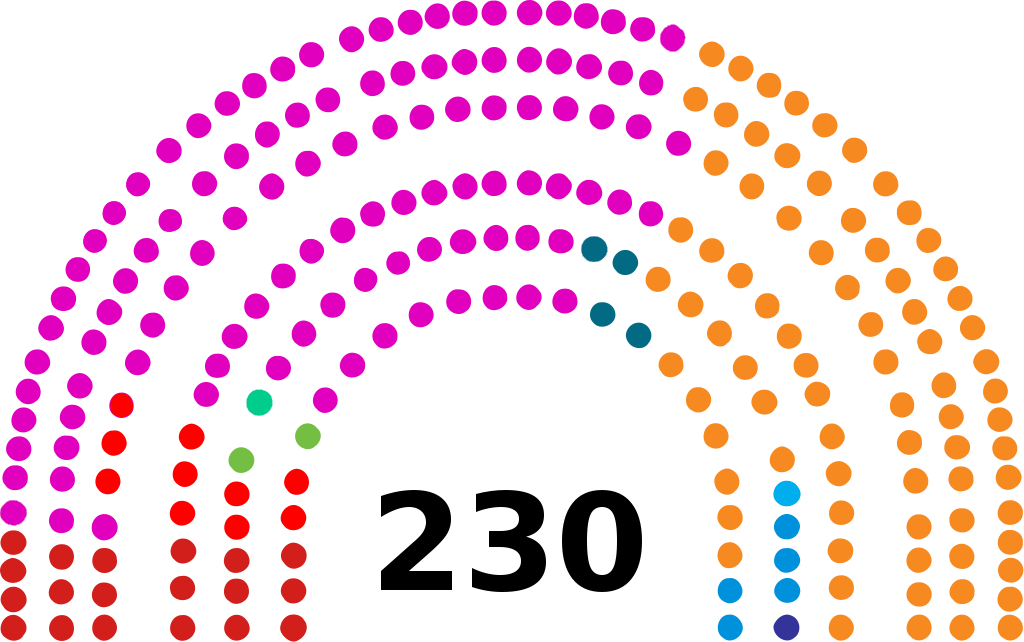
- Members: 230
- President: Eduardo Ferro Rodrigues (PS)
- First Vice-President: Edite Estrela (PS)
- Second Vice-President: Fernando Negrão (PPD/PSD)
- Third Vice-President: José Manuel Pureza (BE)
- Fourth Vice-President: António Filipe (PCP)
- First Secretary: Maria da Luz Rosinha (PS)
- Second Secretary: Duarte Pacheco (PPD/PSD)
- Third Secretary: Nelson Peralta (BE)
- Fourth Secretary: Ana Mesquita (PCP)

The 14th Legislature of the Third Portuguese Republic (Portuguese: XIV Legislatura da Terceira República Portuguesa) was a meeting of the Assembly of the Republic, the legislative body of Portugal. It convened on 25 October 2019, with its membership determined by the results of the 2019 Portuguese legislative election held the previous 6 October.

On 5 December 2021, the President of the Republic decreed its dissolution and called for a snap election on 30 January 2022, following the budget rejection by the Assembly in October 2021. The Legislature ended on 28 March 2022.

== Election ==
The 15th Portuguese legislative election was held on 6 October 2019. In the election, the Socialist Party (PS) became the largest party in the Assembly of the Republic but fell short of a majority.

Party	Assembly of the Republic			
Party	Votes	%	Seats	+/−
PS	1,903,687	36.35	108	+22
PPD/PSD	1,454,283	27.77	79	–10
BE	498,549	9.52	19	±0
CDU	332,018	6.34	12	–5
CDS–PP	221,094	4.22	5	–13
PAN	173,931	3.32	4	+3
Chega	67,502	1.29	1	+1
IL	67,443	1.29	1	+1
Livre	56,940	1.09	1	+1
Other/blank/invalid	462,037	8.82	0	±0
Total	5,237,484	100.00	230	±0

== Composition (2019–2022) ==
Party	Parliamentary leader	Elected		Dissolution	
Party	Parliamentary leader	Seats	%	Seats	%
PS	Ana Catarina Mendes (Setúbal)	108	47.0	108	47.0
PPD/PSD	Rui Rio (Porto) (2019–2020); Adão Silva (Bragança) (2020–2022)	79	34.4	79	34.4
BE	Pedro Filipe Soares (Lisbon)	19	8.2	19	8.2
PCP	João Oliveira (Évora)	10	4.4	10	4.4
CDS–PP	Cecília Meireles (Porto) (2019–2020); Telmo Correia (Braga) (2020–2022)	5	2.2	5	2.2
PAN	Inês Sousa Real (Lisbon) (2019–2021); Bebiana Cunha (Porto) (2021–2022)	4	1.7	3	1.3
PEV	José Luís Ferreira (Setúbal)	2	0.9	2	0.9
Chega	André Ventura (Lisbon)	1	0.4	1	0.4
IL	João Cotrim de Figueiredo (Lisbon)	1	0.4	1	0.4
Livre	Joacine Katar Moreira (Lisbon)	1	0.4	0	0.0
Non-attached	Joacine Katar Moreira (Lisbon); Cristina Rodrigues (Setúbal)	0	0.0	2	0.8
Total		230	100.0	230	100.0

=== Changes ===
- Joacine Katar Moreira, LIVRE (L) → Non-attached: Left LIVRE after the party leadership withdrew their confidence in her, due to deep disagreements between both sides.
- Cristina Rodrigues, People Animals Nature (PAN) → Non-attached: Left PAN following deep disagreements with the party's leadership.

== Election for President of the Assembly of the Republic ==
To be elected, a candidate needs to reach a minimum of 116 votes. Then incumbent President of the Assembly Eduardo Ferro Rodrigues, since 2015, ran for a second term and was easily re-elected:

Election of the President of the Assembly of the Republic
Ballot →	25 October 2019	
Required majority →	116 out of 230	
Eduardo Ferro Rodrigues (PS)	178 / 230	check
Blank ballots	44 / 230	
Invalid ballots	8 / 230	
Absentees	0 / 230	

== Other elections for the bureau of the Assembly of the Republic ==
=== Vice Presidents of the Assembly of the Republic ===
Election of the Vice Presidents of the Assembly of the Republic
1st Ballot →	25 October 2019	
Required majority →	116 out of 230	
Edite Estrela (PS)	177 / 230	check
Fernando Negrão (PPD/PSD)	165 / 230	check
José Manuel Pureza (BE)	172 / 230	check
António Filipe (PCP)	170 / 230	check
Absentees	1 / 230	
Sources: Assembleia da República

=== Secretaries of the Assembly of the Republic ===
Election of the Secretaries of the Assembly of the Republic
1st Ballot →	25 October 2019	
Required majority →	116 out of 230	
Maria da Luz Rosinha (PS)	181 / 230	check
Duarte Pacheco (PPD/PSD)	181 / 230	check
Nelson Peralta (BE)	157 / 230	check
Ana Mesquita (PCP)	160 / 230	check
Absentees	1 / 230	
Sources: Assembleia da República

=== Deputy Secretaries of the Assembly of the Republic ===
Election of the Deputy Secretaries of the Assembly of the Republic
1st Ballot →	25 October 2019	
Required majority →	116 out of 230	
Diogo Leão (PS)	186 / 230	check
Helga Correia (PPD/PSD)	165 / 230	check
Sofia Araújo (PS)	176 / 230	check
Lina Lopes (PPD/PSD)	151 / 230	check
Absentees	1 / 230	
Sources: Assembleia da República

== Parliamentary committees ==
=== Permanent committees ===
Committee	Chair		Vice-chairs	
Constitutional Affairs, Rights, Freedoms and Guarantees	Luís Marques Guedes	PSD	José Magalhães	PS
Constitutional Affairs, Rights, Freedoms and Guarantees	Luís Marques Guedes	PSD	José Manuel Pureza	BE
Foreign Affairs and Portuguese Communities	Sérgio Sousa Pinto	PS	Carlos Alberto Gonçalves	PSD
Foreign Affairs and Portuguese Communities	Sérgio Sousa Pinto	PS	Pedro Filipe Soares	BE
National Defence	Marcos Perestrello	PS	Carlos Eduardo Reis	PSD
National Defence	Marcos Perestrello	PS	João Vasconcelos	BE
European Affairs	Luís Capoulas Santos	PS	Paulo Moniz	PSD
European Affairs	Luís Capoulas Santos	PS	Fabíola Cardoso	BE
Budget and Finance	Filipe Neto Brandão	PS	Alberto Fonseca	PSD
Budget and Finance	Filipe Neto Brandão	PS	Mariana Mortágua	BE
Economy, Innovation, Public Works and Housing	António Topa (2019–2021); Jorge Paulo Oliveira (2021–2022)	PSD	Pedro Coimbra	PS
Economy, Innovation, Public Works and Housing	António Topa (2019–2021); Jorge Paulo Oliveira (2021–2022)	PSD	Bruno Dias	PCP
Agriculture and Sea	Pedro do Carmo	PS	António Lima Costa	PSD
Agriculture and Sea	Pedro do Carmo	PS	Cecília Meireles	CDS–PP
Education, Science, Youth and Sports	Firmino Marques	PSD	Carla Sousa	PS
Education, Science, Youth and Sports	Firmino Marques	PSD	Joana Mortágua	BE
Health	Maria Antónia Almeida Santos	PS	Alberto Machado	PSD
Health	Maria Antónia Almeida Santos	PS	Paula Santos	PCP
Labour and Social Security	Pedro Roque	PSD	Nuno Sá	PS
Labour and Social Security	Pedro Roque	PSD	Diana Ferreira	PCP
Environment, Energy and Territorial Organization	José Maria Cardoso	BE	Luís Graça	PS
Environment, Energy and Territorial Organization	José Maria Cardoso	BE	Paulo Leitão	PSD
Culture and Communication	Ana Paula Vitorino	PS	Fernanda Velez	PSD
Culture and Communication	Ana Paula Vitorino	PS	Beatriz Gomes Dias	BE
Public Administration, Administrative Modernization, Descentralization and Local government	Fernando Ruas (2019–2021); Isaura Morais (2021–2022)	PSD	Raul Miguel de Castro	PS
Public Administration, Administrative Modernization, Descentralization and Local government	Fernando Ruas (2019–2021); Isaura Morais (2021–2022)	PSD	José Maria Cardoso	BE
Transparency and Deputy's statutes	Jorge Lacão	PS	Hugo Patrício Oliveira	PSD
Transparency and Deputy's statutes	Jorge Lacão	PS	João Oliveira	PCP

=== Parliamentary inquiry committees ===
Committee	Establishment	Disestablishment	Chair		Vice-chairs	
On the State's Action in the attribution of subsidies in the aftermath of the 2017 wildfires in Pinhal Interior	24 March 2020	27 March 2021	Paulo Rios de Oliveira	PSD	Joaquim Barreto	PS
On the State's Action in the attribution of subsidies in the aftermath of the 2017 wildfires in Pinhal Interior	24 March 2020	27 March 2021	Paulo Rios de Oliveira	PSD	João Almeida	CDS–PP
On the losses registered by Novo Banco and added to the Resolution Fund	15 December 2020	22 October 2021	Fernando Negrão	PSD	Isabel Oneto	PS
On the losses registered by Novo Banco and added to the Resolution Fund	15 December 2020	22 October 2021	Fernando Negrão	PSD	Duarte Alves	PCP

=== Other parliamentary committees ===
Committee	Establishment	Disestablishment	Chair		Vice-chairs	
Of Verification of the Powers of the Elected Deputies	25 October 2019	30 October 2019	Filipe Neto Brandão	PS	Carlos Peixoto	PSD
Of Verification of the Powers of the Elected Deputies	25 October 2019	30 October 2019	Filipe Neto Brandão	PS	José Manuel Pureza	BE
On accompanying the application of the measures in response to the COVID-19 pandemic and the process of economic and social recovery	24 September 2020	28 March 2022	Luís Moreira Testa	PS	Ofélia Ramos	PSD
On accompanying the application of the measures in response to the COVID-19 pandemic and the process of economic and social recovery	24 September 2020	28 March 2022	Luís Moreira Testa	PS	Moisés Ferreira	BE
For the Constitutional Revision	10 May 2021	28 June 2021	Pedro Delgado Alves	PS	Catarina Rocha Freitas	PSD
For the Constitutional Revision	10 May 2021	28 June 2021	Pedro Delgado Alves	PS	José Luís Ferreira	PEV
