= 13th Legislature of the Third Portuguese Republic =

←	12th Legislature	14th Legislature	→

Overview
- Legislative body: Assembly of the Republic
- Meeting place: Palace of Saint Benedict
- Term: 23 October 2015 – 24 October 2019
- Election: 4 October 2015
- Government: XX Constitutional Government (2015); XXI Constitutional Government (2015–2019)
- Website: parlamento.pt

Deputies
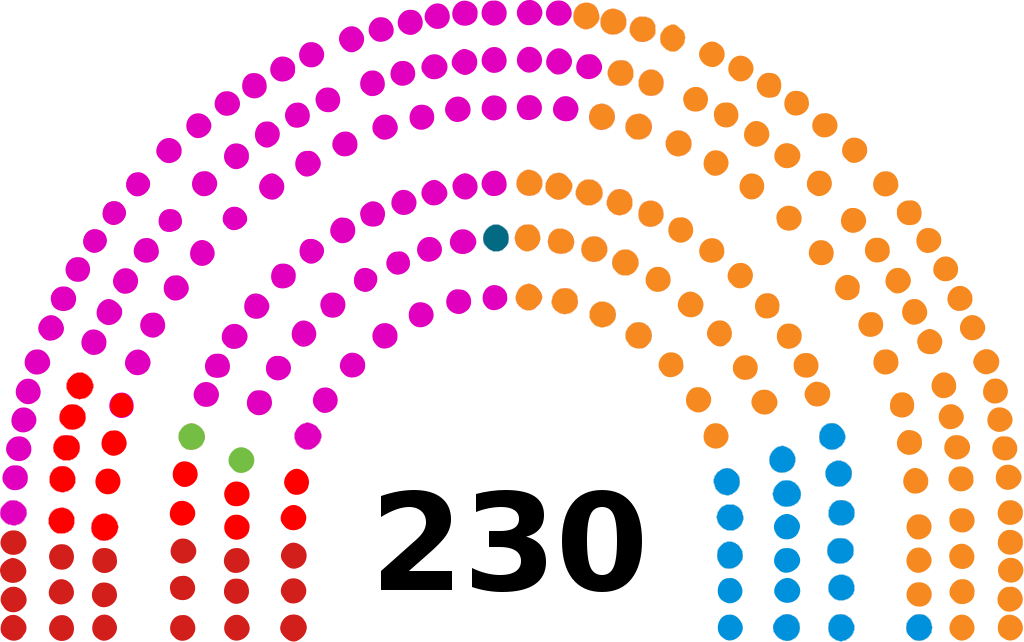
- Members: 230
- President: Eduardo Ferro Rodrigues (PS)
- First Vice-President: José Matos Correia (PPD/PSD)
- Second Vice-President: Jorge Lacão (PS)
- Third Vice-President: José Manuel Pureza (BE)
- Fourth Vice-President: Teresa Caeiro (CDS–PP)
- First Secretary: Duarte Pacheco (PPD/PSD)
- Second Secretary: Idália Serrão (PS) (2015–2019); Sandra Pontedeira (PS) (2019)
- Third Secretary: Moisés Ferreira (BE)
- Fourth Secretary: Abel Baptista (CDS–PP) (2015–2016); António Carlos Monteiro (CDS–PP) (2016–2019)

The 13th Legislature of the Third Portuguese Republic (Portuguese: XIII Legislatura da Terceira República Portuguesa) was a meeting of the Assembly of the Republic, the legislative body of Portugal. It convened on 23 October 2015, with its membership determined by the results of the 2015 Portuguese legislative election held the previous 4 October. The Legislature ran its full term of 4 years, and ended on 24 October 2019.

== Election ==
The 14th Portuguese legislative election was held on 4 October 2015. In the election, the Portugal Ahead coalition (PàF), composed by the Social Democratic Party (PPD/PSD) and the CDS – People's Party (CDS–PP), remained as the largest party, but fell short of a majority. The Socialist Party (PS), the Left Bloc (BE), the Portuguese Communist Party (PCP) and the Ecologist Party "The Greens" (PEV) managed to form a minority government led by PS with the support of BE, PCP and PEV.

Party	Assembly of the Republic			
Party	Votes	%	Seats	+/−
PàF	2,085,465	38.56	107	–25
PS	1,747,730	32.32	86	+12
BE	550,945	10.19	19	+11
CDU	445,901	8.25	17	+1
PAN	75,170	1.39	1	+1
Other/blank/invalid	502,881	9.29	0	±0
Total	5,408,092	100.00	230	±0

== Composition (2015–2019) ==
Party	Parliamentary leader	Elected		Dissolution	
Party	Parliamentary leader	Seats	%	Seats	%
PPD/PSD	Luís Montenegro (Aveiro) (2015–2017); Hugo Soares (Braga) (2017–2018); Fernando Negrão (Setúbal) (2018–2019)	89	38.7	89	38.7
PS	Carlos César (Azores)	86	37.4	85	37.0
BE	Pedro Filipe Soares (Lisbon)	19	8.2	19	8.2
CDS–PP	Nuno Magalhães (Setúbal)	18	7.8	18	7.8
PCP	João Oliveira (Évora)	15	6.5	15	6.5
PEV	Heloísa Apolónia (Setúbal)	2	0.9	2	0.9
PAN	André Silva (Lisbon)	1	0.4	1	0.4
Non-attached	Paulo Trigo Pereira (Setúbal)	0	0.0	1	0.4
Total		230	100.0	230	100.0

=== Changes ===
- Paulo Trigo Pereira, Socialist Party (PS) → Non-attached: Left the Socialists' parliamentary group citing policy differences between him and the caucus leadership.

== Election for President of the Assembly of the Republic ==
To be elected, a candidate needs to reach a minimum of 116 votes. The Socialist Party (PS), backed by the Left Bloc (BE) and the Portuguese Communist Party (PCP), proposed Eduardo Ferro Rodrigues as their candidate, while the Social Democratic Party (PSD) proposed Fernando Negrão, who was backed by the CDS – People's Party (CDS–PP). Eduardo Ferro Rodrigues was elected:

Election of the President of the Assembly of the Republic
Ballot →	23 October 2015	
Required majority →	116 out of 230	
Eduardo Ferro Rodrigues (PS)	120 / 230	check
Fernando Negrão (PPD/PSD)	108 / 230	☒
Blank ballots	2 / 230	
Invalid ballots	0 / 230	
Absentees	0 / 230	
Sources: Público

== Other elections for the bureau of the Assembly of the Republic ==
=== Vice Presidents of the Assembly of the Republic ===
Election of the Vice Presidents of the Assembly of the Republic
1st Ballot →	28 October 2015	
Required majority →	116 out of 230	
José Matos Correia (PPD/PSD)	173 / 230	check
Jorge Lacão (PS)	122 / 230	check
José Manuel Pureza (BE)	137 / 230	check
Teresa Caeiro (CDS–PP)	172 / 230	check
Absentees	4 / 230	
Sources: Diário da Assembleia da República

=== Secretaries of the Assembly of the Republic ===
Election of the Secretaries of the Assembly of the Republic
1st Ballot →	28 October 2015	
Required majority →	116 out of 230	
Duarte Pacheco (PPD/PSD)	188 / 230	check
Idália Serrão (PS)	134 / 230	check
Moisés Ferreira (BE)	124 / 230	check
Abel Baptista (CDS–PP)	170 / 230	check
Absentees	4 / 230	
Sources: Diário da Assembleia da República

Abel Baptista left parliament in July 2016 after not being chosen as the party's candidate for Mayor of Ponte de Lima in the 2017 local elections. A new fourth Secretary of the Assembly of the Republic was chosen, with António Carlos Monteiro being elected.

Election of the 4th Secretary of the Assembly of the Republic
1st Ballot →	14 October 2016	
Required majority →	116 out of 230	
António Carlos Monteiro (CDS–PP)	164 / 230	check
Blank ballots	51 / 230	
Invalid ballots	4 / 230	
Absentees	11 / 230	
Sources: Diário da Assembleia da República

On 4 January 2019, Idália Serrão left parliament to join the administration of Bank Montepio. Sandra Pontedeira succeeded her as Secretary of the Assembly of the Republic.

Election of the 2nd Secretary of the Assembly of the Republic
1st Ballot →	11 January 2019	
Required majority →	116 out of 230	
Sandra Pontedeira (PS)	170 / 230	check
Blank ballots	33 / 230	
Invalid ballots	10 / 230	
Absentees	17 / 230	
Sources: Diário da Assembleia da República

=== Deputy Secretaries of the Assembly of the Republic ===
Election of the Deputy Secretaries of the Assembly of the Republic
1st Ballot →	28 October 2015	
Required majority →	116 out of 230	
Pedro Alves (PPD/PSD)	177 / 230	check
Luísa Salgueiro (PS)	130 / 230	check
Emília Santos (PPD/PSD)	170 / 230	check
Diogo Leão (PS)	124 / 230	check
Absentees	4 / 230	
Sources: Diário da Assembleia da República

Luísa Salgueiro left the post of 2nd Deputy Secretary shortly after being elected, being replaced by Sandra Pontedeira.

Election of the 2nd Deputy Secretary of the Assembly of the Republic
1st Ballot →	18 December 2015	
Required majority →	116 out of 230	
Sandra Pontedeira (PS)	134 / 230	check
Blank ballots	82 / 230	
Invalid ballots	10 / 230	
Absentees	4 / 230	
Sources: Diário da Assembleia da República

After Idália Serrão left parliament and Sandra Pontedeira rose to the post of Secretary, Sofia Araújo became Deputy Secretary.

Election of the 2nd Deputy Secretary of the Assembly of the Republic
1st Ballot →	11 January 2019	
Required majority →	116 out of 230	
Sofia Araújo (PS)	168 / 230	check
Blank ballots	35 / 230	
Invalid ballots	10 / 230	
Absentees	17 / 230	
Sources: Diário da Assembleia da República
