= Isabel Mendes Lopes =

Portuguese politician (born 1982)

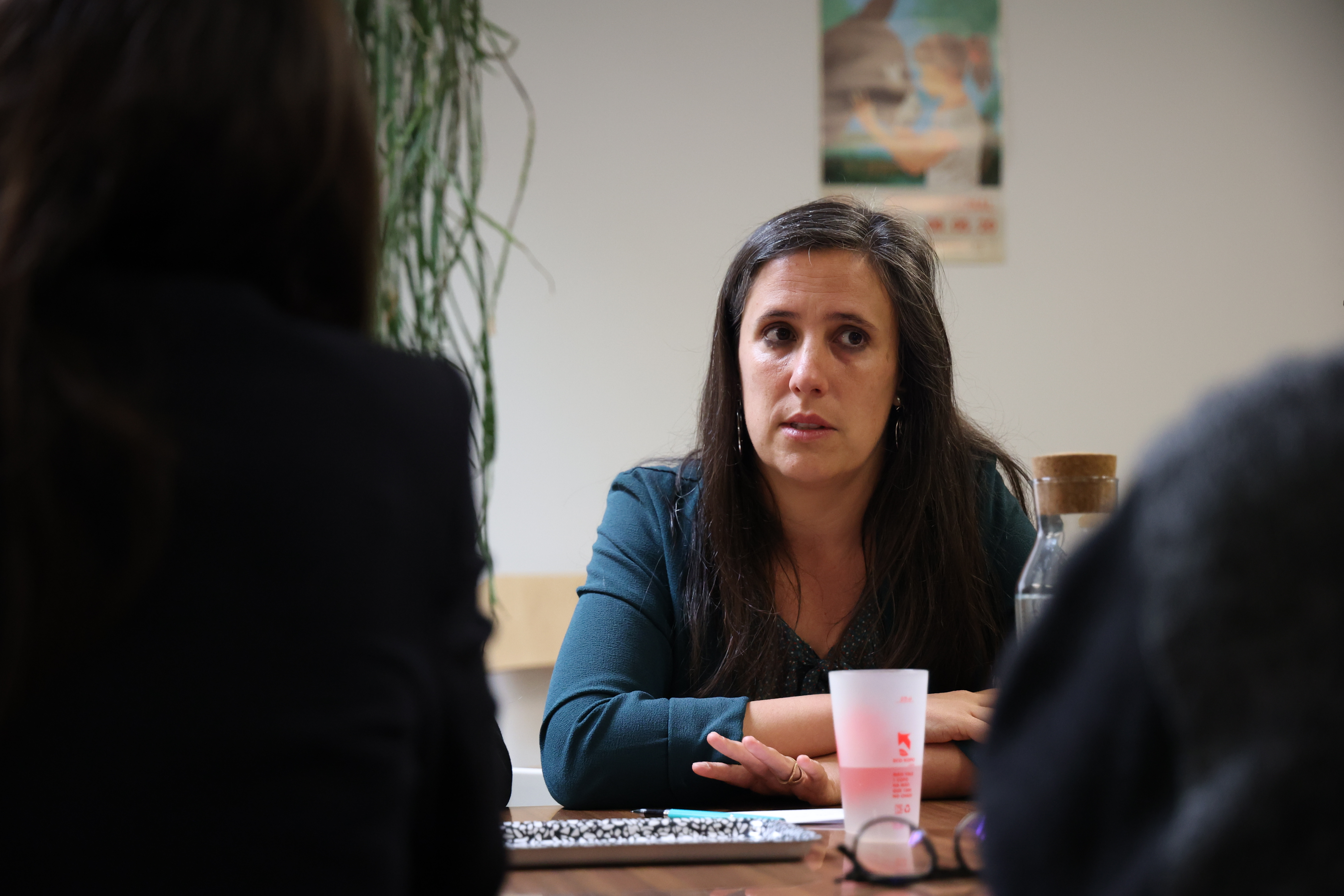
- Lopes in March 2024

Co-spokesperson of LIVRE
- Incumbent
- Assumed office 12 May 2024 Serving with Rui Tavares (2024–2026) and Jorge Pinto (since 2026)
- Preceded by: Teresa Mota
- In office 19 January 2020 – 6 March 2022 Serving with Pedro Mendonça
- Preceded by: Position created
- Succeeded by: Teresa Mota

President of the LIVRE parliamentary group
- Incumbent
- Assumed office 26 March 2024
- Preceded by: Position created

Member of the Assembly of the Republic
- Incumbent
- Assumed office 26 March 2024
- Constituency: Lisbon

Personal details
- Born: Isabel Rendeiro Marques Mendes Lopes; 28 February 1982 (age 44) United Kingdom
- Party: LIVRE
- Education: Instituto Superior Técnico
- Occupation: Civil engineer

Isabel Rendeiro Marques Mendes Lopes (born 28 February 1982) is a Portuguese civil engineer, politician and member of the Assembly of the Republic, the national legislature of Portugal. A member of the LIVRE party, she has represented Lisbon since March 2024.

== Early life ==
Lopes was born on 28 February 1982 in the United Kingdom. She moved to Portugal at the age of two and lives in Lisbon. She has a degree in civil engineering (2005) from the Instituto Superior Técnico (IST). She also has a master's degree (2008) in mobility and transport from IST.

== Career ==
Lopes is a civil engineer by profession, specialising in transport and planning. She worked for Infraestruturas de Portugal until 2022. She has been a storyteller of children's books since 2018 and has also done theatrical work.

Interested in building a more just and dignified society and strengthening democracy, Lopes was involved with the Congresso Democrático das Alternativas (Democratic Congress of Alternatives) and similar organisations. She has been a member of the LIVRE party since its foundation in 2013 and was part of the Contact Group, the party's executive body, from 2015 to 2022. She was a political advisor to LIVRE's parliamentary office from 2022 to 2024. She has been a member of Lisbon City Council since 2021. At the 2022 legislative election Lopes was placed second on LIVRE's list of candidates in Lisbon but the party only won a single seat in the constituency. She was elected to the Assembly of the Republic at the 2024 legislative election. After the election the party's parliamentary group unanimously chose Lopes to be its leader.

== Electoral history ==
Year	Election	Office	Party	Pos.	Votes		#	Status	Notes	Ref.
Year	Election	Office	Party	Pos.	Total	%	#	Status	Notes	Ref.
2016	Azorean regional election in São Miguel	Legislative Assembly of the Azores	L/TDA	13/20	205	0.44 / 100.00	10th	Not elected		
2017	Local election in Lisbon	City Council	PS	14/17	106,037	42.00 / 100.00	1st	Not elected	Ran under the PS lists.	
2019	Legislative election in Viana do Castelo	Assembly of the Republic	L	6/6	668	0.56 / 100.00	10th	Not elected		
2020	Azorean regional election in São Miguel	Legislative Assembly of the Azores	L	17/20	265	0.52 / 100.00	10th	Not elected		
2021	Local election in Lisbon	Municipal Assembly	More Lisbon (PS.L)	8/51	74,768	30.79 / 100.00	2nd	Elected		
2022	Legislative election in Lisbon	Assembly of the Republic	L	2/48	28,834	2.44 / 100.00	7th	Not elected		
2024	Legislative election in Lisbon	Assembly of the Republic	L	2/48	72,102	5.47 / 100.00	5th	Elected	Elected president of the parliamentary group of LIVRE in 2024.	
2025	Legislative election in Lisbon	Assembly of the Republic	L	2/48	87,530	6.87 / 100.00	5th	Elected		

=== LIVRE leadership election, 2020 ===
Ballot: 19 January 2020
Candidate	Votes	%
Isabel Mendes Lopes; Filipe Honório	95	86.4
Abstention	15	13.6
Turnout	110	
Source: TVI

=== LIVRE leadership election, 2024 ===
Ballot: 12 May 2024
Candidate	Votes	%
Isabel Mendes Lopes; Rui Tavares	240	60.9
Natércia Lopes	86	21.8
João Manso	56	14.2
Abstention	12	3.0
Turnout	394	
Source: Official results

=== LIVRE leadership election, 2026 ===
Ballot: 12 July 2026
Candidate	Votes	%
Isabel Mendes Lopes; Jorge Pinto	432	67.9
Rodrigo Brito	132	20.8
Tiago Mota	60	9.4
Abstention	12	1.9
Turnout	636	
Source: Público
