= Filipa Pinto =

Portuguese politician (born 1971)

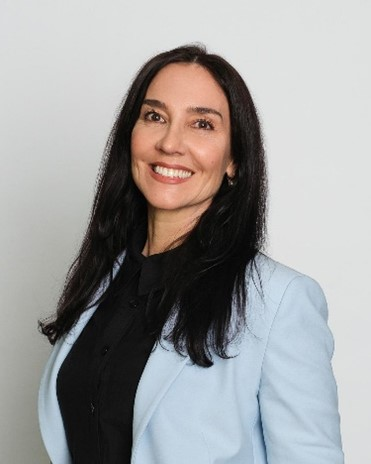
- Pinto in September 2024

Member of the Assembly of the Republic
- Incumbent
- Assumed office 3 June 2025
- Constituency: Porto
- In office 7 October 2024 – 31 January 2025
- Preceded by: Jorge Pinto
- Succeeded by: Jorge Pinto
- Constituency: Porto

Personal details
- Born: Filipa Maria Gonçalves Pinto; 29 May 1971 (age 55) Valongo, Portugal
- Party: LIVRE
- Education: University of Minho
- Profession: Teacher

Filipa Maria Gonçalves Pinto (born 29 May 1971) is a Portuguese teacher, politician and member of the Assembly of the Republic, the national legislature of Portugal. A member of the LIVRE party, she was elected to represent Porto at the 2025 legislative election. She was previously a member of the Assembly between October 2024 and January 2025.

== Early life ==
Pinto was born on 29 May 1971 in Valongo. She grew up in the village of Sobrado. She has a Bachelor's degree in teaching Portuguese-English from the University of Minho (1993).

== Career ==
After graduating Pinto was an intern in Caldas das Taipas before moving to Lisbon where she taught in São João da Talha and Loures. She has taught at the Escola Secundária in Lousada since 1996. She also taught at the Instituto de Línguas – APAR in Penafiel, preparing students for the Cambridge Exams. She is also an advisor at the National Education Council.

Pinto entered politics in 2019 when she unsuccessfully contested the 2019 European Parliament election as an independent candidate on LIVRE's list. She later joined LIVRE and is a member of the party's Contact Group, the party's executive body. She was a candidate for LIVRE at the 2022 legislative election in Porto but the party failed to win any seats in the constituency. She was a candidate for LIVRE at the 2024 legislative election in Porto but the party only won one seat in the constituency. She was a candidate for LIVRE at the 2024 European Parliament election but the party failed to win any seats. She temporarily replaced Jorge Pinto in the Assembly of the Republic between October 2024 and January 2025 whilst he was on paternity leave. She was elected at the 2025 legislative election.

== Electoral history ==
Electoral history of Filipa Pinto
| Election | Constituency | Party | No. | Result |
|---|---|---|---|---|
| 2019 European | Portugal | LIVRE | 10 | Not elected |
| 2022 legislative | Porto | LIVRE | 4 | Not elected |
| 2024 legislative | Porto | LIVRE | 2 | Not elected |
| 2024 European | Portugal | LIVRE | 2 | Not elected |
| 2025 legislative | Porto | LIVRE | 2 | Elected |
