= Ana Mesquita =

Portuguese politician and archaeologist (born 1979)

Member of the Assembly of the Republic of Portugal
- In office 2015–2022
- Parliamentary group: Unitary Democratic Coalition (CDU)
- Constituency: (1) Lisbon; (2) Porto

Personal details
- Born: Ana Cristina Cardoso Dias Mesquita; 22 March 1979 (age 47) Vila Nova de Gaia, Portugal
- Party: Portuguese: Portuguese Communist Party (PCP)
- Spouse: Ricardo Filipe Mateus de Matos Bastos
- Education: University of Coimbra
- Occupation: Archaeologist

Ana Mesquita (born 22 March 1979) is a Portuguese politician and archaeologist. She was a deputy in the Assembly of the Republic of Portugal in the 13th and 14th legislature representing the Unitary Democratic Coalition (CDU), which is a coalition between the Portuguese Communist Party (PCP), of which she is a member, and the Ecologist Party "The Greens".

== Early life ==
Ana Cristina Cardoso Dias Mesquita was born in Portugal's second city of Porto on 22 March 1979. She lived most of her youth in the town of Rio Tinto in the municipality of Gondomar, north of Porto. Mesquita obtained a degree in archaeology and history from the University of Coimbra and became a practising archaeologist in 2009. At a young age she was a keen soccer player. She continued to play while at university in Coimbra and, later, for the C.D. Olivais e Moscavide club in Lisbon.

== Political career ==
Mesquita was chair of the Board of the Archaeology Workers Union of Portugal between May 2014 and November 2017 and remains a member of the board. A member of the Portuguese Communist Party (PCP), she was elected in 2015 as a deputy to the 13th Legislature of the Assembly of the Republic, representing the Lisbon constituency. In 2019 she was re-elected, but this time on the Unitary Democratic Coalition's list of candidates for Porto, where she was second on the list after Diana Ferreira. She has served on the Education and Science Commission, the Environment, Spatial Planning, Decentralization, Local Government and Housing Commission and the Culture, Communication, Youth and Sport Commission in the role of co-ordinator of the Unitary Democratic Coalition parliamentary group. In January 2021, she was chosen as one of two of the 10 PCP parliamentarians to be given priority access to COVID-19 vaccine, because of the importance of the role she played in the Assembly.
