= Non-attached member (Portugal) =

Parliament members not belonging to any group in the Western European country

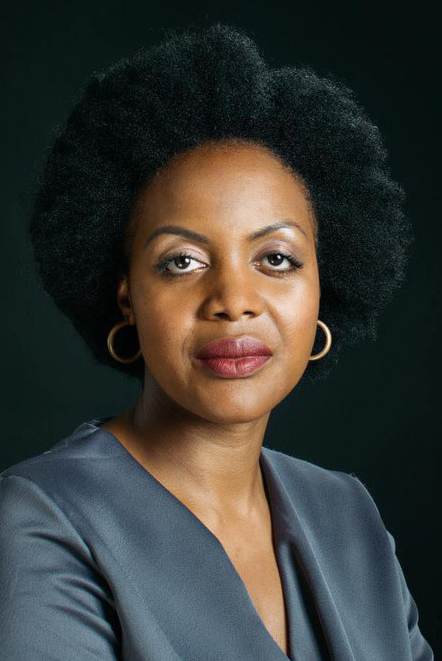
Joacine Katar Moreira, elected in the LIVRE lists for the 14th Legislature, lost party confidence in January 2020 and became a non-attached member

A non-attached member (Portuguese: deputado não inscrito em grupo parlamentar, lit. 'member not attached to a parliamentary group'; or simply, deputado não inscrito, NINSC) are members of parliament who do not belong to any parliamentary group of the Assembly of the Republic, the Portuguese parliament. It corresponds to the situation in which a member elected by a given political party later leaves that party's parliamentary group but opts to remain a member of parliament for the remainder of the legislative session.

Non-attached members lose several rights compared to the other members of parliament. One of the main rights they lose is the possibility of partaking in the fortnightly debates with the Prime Minister; the number of political statements they can make is reduced from three to two in each year of the legislature, each lasting one minute, and they also lose the right to propose, once a year, the topic to be discussed in a plenary session. They also lose the right to intervene in the annual State of the Nation debate and in the debate concerning the Government Programme.

Non-attached members can join some parliamentary committees on request, retaining the right to be informed of the agendas of the Conference of Leaders on the same day. Non-attached members have the right of initiative, and can present a bill, but cannot put it to the vote or debate in plenary.

Examples of notable non-attached members are Paulo Trigo Pereira, who left the Socialist Party parliamentary group in December 2018, Joacine Katar Moreira, elected by LIVRE in October 2019, but later lost the political confidence of the party leadership in January 2020, and Miguel Arruda, elected in 2024 in the Chega lists and who left the party in 2025 following an accusation that he allegedly stole several suitcases at Lisbon and Ponta Delgada airports.
