= Jorge Pinto =

Portuguese politician (born 1987)

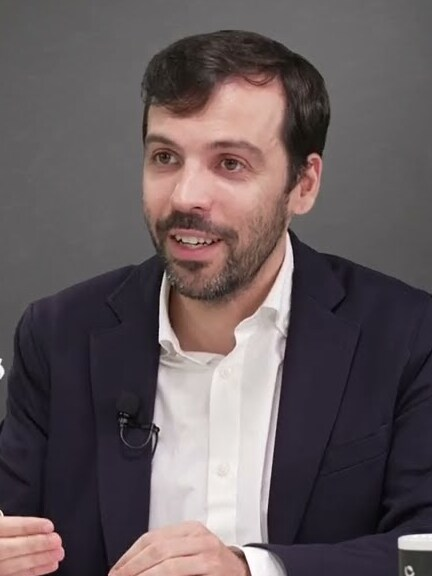
- Pinto in 2025

Co-spokesperson of LIVRE
- Incumbent
- Assumed office 12 July 2026 Serving with Isabel Mendes Lopes
- Preceded by: Rui Tavares

Member of the Assembly of the Republic
- Incumbent
- Assumed office 26 March 2024
- Constituency: Porto

Personal details
- Born: Eduardo Jorge Costa Pinto; 20 April 1987 (age 39) Amarante, Portugal
- Party: LIVRE
- Education: University of Minho

Eduardo Jorge Costa Pinto (born 20 April 1987) is a Portuguese environmental engineer, politician and member of the Assembly of the Republic, the national legislature of Portugal. A member of the LIVRE party, he has represented Porto since March 2024.

== Early life ==
Pinto was born on 20 April 1987 in Amarante. He received a master's degree in environmental engineering the University of Porto in 2010 after producing a thesis titled Rainwater Harvesting Systems Implementation Inside Karunya University Campus for the Karunya University. He received a doctorate in social and political philosophy from the University of Minho in 2020 after producing a thesis titled Green republicanism: non-domination for an ecologically sustainable planet.

== Career ==
Pinto is an environmental engineer by profession. He has worked abroad since 2008, in Lithuania, India, France, Italy and most recently in Brussels since 2012. He was a research associate at the University of Minho's Centre for Ethics, Politics and Society.

Pinto has written a number of books and comic books. The comic book Amadeo, a vida e obra entre Amarante e Paris (2018), about the life of painter Amadeo de Souza Cardoso, was written by Pinto and illustrated by Eduardo Viana. Rendimento Básico Incondicional - Uma defesa da liberdade (2019), which he co-authored, won the 2019 Philosophy Essay Prize from the Portuguese Philosophy Society. Tamem digo - uma história de migrações (2022), written by Pinto and illustrated by Julia da Costa, tells the story of Pinto's grandmother Maria do Carmo and other women who stayed behind during the wave migration to France under fascist rule in Portugal. He also wrote the plays Uma História Trágico-Marítima, which received an honourable mention in the 2017 INATEL/Teatro da Trindade awards, and Seis meses.

Between the ages of 18 and 25, Pinto was a member of the Socialist Party but became disillusioned with the party's lack of commitment to progressivism, environmentalism and the European left ideals. He was one of the founders of the LIVRE party and was part of the Contact Group, the party's executive body, from 2014 to 2020. At the 2015 legislative election Pinto was placed first on LIVRE's list of candidates in Europe but the party failed to win any seats in the constituency. He was a candidate for LIVRE at the 2019 and 2022 legislative elections in Porto but on each occasion the party failed to win any seats in the constituency. He was elected to the Assembly of the Republic at the 2024 legislative election. He was re-elected at the 2025 legislative election.

On 1 November 2025, Pinto announced in hometown Amarante that he would contest the 2026 Portuguese presidential election. At the election on 18 January 2026 Pinto came ninth after receiving 0.68% of the votes. He subsequently endorsed socialist candidate António José Seguro for the run-off election to be held on 8 February 2026.

== Electoral history ==
Year	Election	Office	Party	Pos.	Votes		#	Status	Notes
Year	Election	Office	Party	Pos.	Total	%	#	Status	Notes
2015	Legislative election in Europe	Assembly of the Republic	L/TDA	1/2	249	1.82 / 100.00	5th	Not elected	
2019	Legislative election in Porto	Assembly of the Republic	L	1/40	8,952	0.96 / 100.00	9th	Not elected	
2022	Legislative election in Porto	Assembly of the Republic	L	1/40	11,433	1.16 / 100.00	9th	Not elected	
2024	Legislative election in Porto	Assembly of the Republic	L	1/40	37,319	3.35 / 100.00	6th	Elected	
2025	Legislative election in Porto	Assembly of the Republic	L	1/40	47,156	4.30 / 100.00	5th	Elected	
2026	Presidential election	President of the Republic	L	—N/a	38,588	0.68 / 100.00	9th	Not elected	

=== Presidential election, 2026 ===
Ballot: 18 January and 8 February 2026
Candidate	First round		Second round	
Candidate	Votes	%	Votes	%
António José Seguro	1,755,563	31.1	3,502,613	66.8
André Ventura	1,327,021	23.5	1,737,950	33.2
João Cotrim de Figueiredo	903,057	16.0		
Henrique Gouveia e Melo	695,377	12.3		
Luís Marques Mendes	637,442	11.3		
Catarina Martins	116,407	2.1		
António Filipe	92,644	1.6		
Manuel João Vieira	60,927	1.1		
Jorge Pinto	38,588	0.7		
André Pestana	10,897	0.2		
Humberto Correia	4,773	0.1		
Blank/Invalid ballots	125,840	–	275,414	–
Turnout	5,768,536	52.39	5,515,977	50.03
Source: Comissão Nacional de Eleições

=== LIVRE leadership election, 2026 ===
Ballot: 12 July 2026
Candidate	Votes	%
Isabel Mendes Lopes; Jorge Pinto	432	67.9
Rodrigo Brito	132	20.8
Tiago Mota	60	9.4
Abstention	12	1.9
Turnout	636	
Source: Público

== Works ==
- —— & Viana, Eduardo (2018). Amadeo, a vida e obra entre Amarante e Paris [Amadeo, life and work between Amarante and Paris] (in Portuguese). Porto Salvo, Portugal: Desassossego. ISBN 978-989-8892-15-7.
- —— & Viana, Eduardo (2019). Liberdade Incondicional 2049 [Unconditional Freedom 2049] (in Portuguese). Brussels, Belgium: Green European Journal.
- ——; Merrill, Roberto; Bizarro, Sara & Marcelo, Gonçalo (2019). Rendimento Básico Incondicional - Uma defesa da liberdade [Unconditional Basic Income - A defense of freedom] (in Portuguese). Lisbon, Portugal: Edições 70. ISBN 978-972-44-2257-2.
- A liberdade dos futuros - ecorrepublicanismo para o século XXI [The freedom of futures - eco-publicanism for the 21st century] (in Portuguese). Lisbon, Portugal: Tinta da China. 2021. ISBN 978-989-671-663-9.
- Tamem digo - uma história de migrações [I also say - a story of migrations] (in Portuguese). Amarante, Portugal: Officina Noctua. 2022. ISBN 978-989-33-3602-1.
- ——; Renan, Evandro & Nozomi, Talita (2024). Tempo - em busca da felicidade perdida [Time - in search of lost happiness] (in Portuguese). Lisbon, Portugal: Iguana. ISBN 978-989-787-171-9.
