= Patricia Gonçalves (politician) =

Portuguese politician (born 1971)

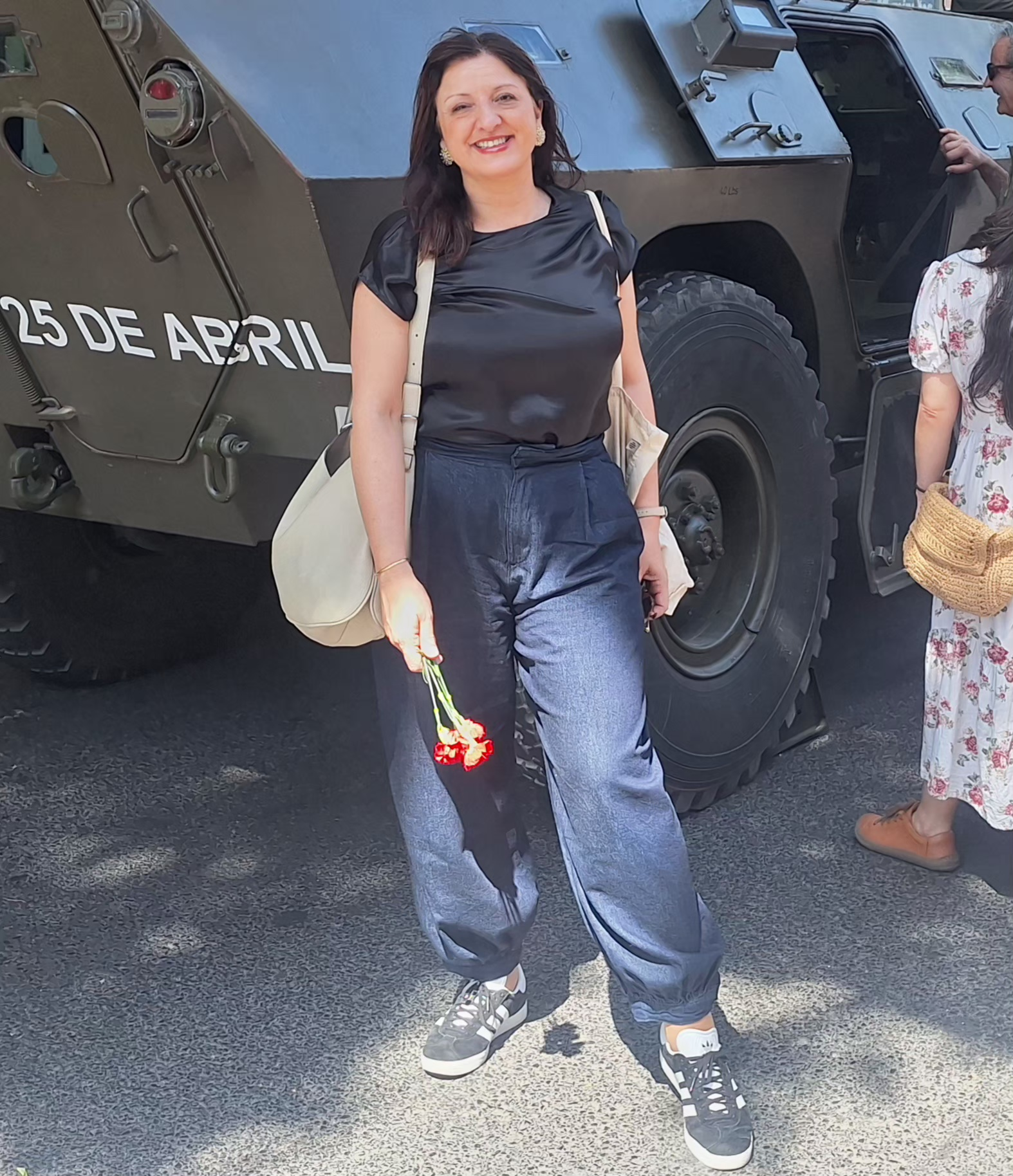
- Gonçalves in April 2026

Member of the Assembly of the Republic
- Incumbent
- Assumed office 2 June 2025
- Constituency: Lisbon

Personal details
- Born: Patrícia Carla Serrano Gonçalves; 1971 (age 54–55) Barreiro, Portugal
- Party: LIVRE
- Education: Instituto Superior Técnico
- Occupation: Academic

Patrícia Carla Serrano Gonçalves (born 1971) is a Portuguese physicist, politician and member of the Assembly of the Republic, the national legislature of Portugal. A member of the LIVRE party, she was elected to represent Lisbon at the 2025 legislative election.

== Early life ==
Gonçalves was born in 1971 in Barreiro. She has a degree in technological physics engineering and a doctorate in physics from the Instituto Superior Técnico (IST).

== Career ==
Gonçalves is a professor in IST's Department of Physics and a researcher at the Laboratory of Instrumentation and Experimental Particles Physics (LIP). She also coordinates a group that develops applications for space exploration in association with the European Space Agency and other European scientific institutes and companies. She is a member of the Association of Scientific Research Scholars (Associação dos Bolseiros de Investigação Científica).

Gonçalves is one of the founders of the Republic and Secularism Association. She joined LIVRE in May 2014. She has served a number of terms on the Contact Group, the party's executive body. She was elected to the Municipal Assembly of Lisbon at the 2017 local elections as a candidate for the Lisbon Needs Everyone (Lisboa Precisa de Todos) list, a coalition between the Socialist Party and LIVRE. She was a candidate for LIVRE at the 2019 European Parliament election but the party failed to win any seats. She was a candidate for LIVRE at the 2019, 2022 and 2024 legislative elections in Lisbon but was not elected. She was elected to the Assembly of the Republic at the 2025 legislative election.

== Personal life ==
Gonçalves has lived in Lisbon since 2003 and has two children.

== Electoral history ==
Electoral history of Patricia Gonçalves
Election	Constituency	Party	Alliance	No.	Result
2017 local	Lisbon Municipal Assembly	LIVRE	Lisbon Needs Everyone	16	Elected
2019 European	Portugal	LIVRE		6	Not elected
2019 legislative	Lisbon	LIVRE		5	Not elected
2022 legislative	Lisbon	LIVRE		4	Not elected
2024 legislative	Lisbon	LIVRE		5	Not elected
2025 legislative	Lisbon	LIVRE		3	Elected
