= Rui Tavares =

Portuguese historian and politician (born 1972)

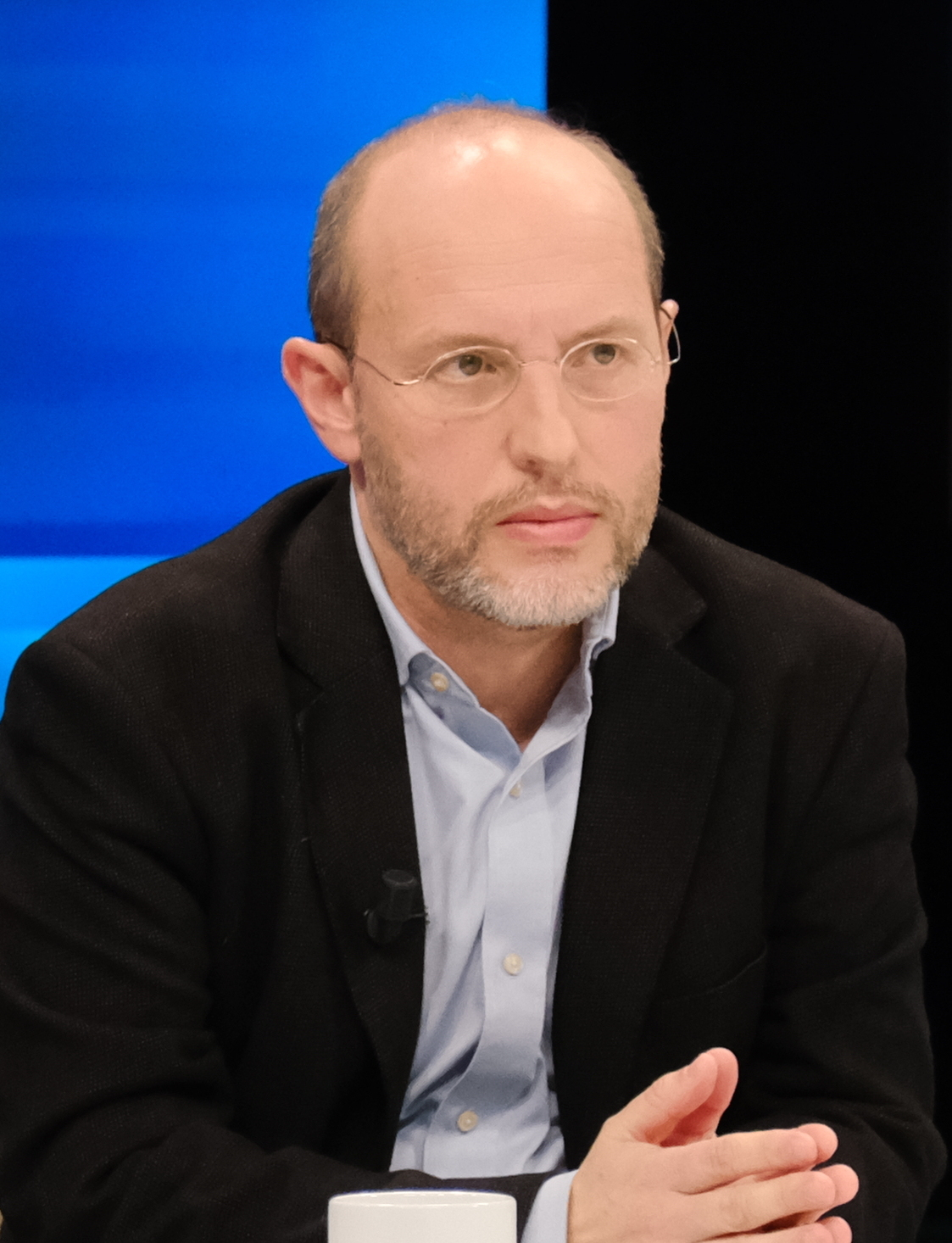
- Tavares in 2024

Co-spokesperson of LIVRE
- In office 6 March 2022 – 12 July 2026 Serving with Teresa Mota (2022–2024) and Isabel Mendes Lopes (2024–2026)
- Preceded by: Pedro Mendonça
- Succeeded by: Jorge Pinto

Member of the Assembly of the Republic
- Incumbent
- Assumed office 29 March 2022
- Constituency: Lisbon

Member of the European Parliament
- In office 14 July 2009 – 30 June 2014
- Constituency: Portugal

City Councillor of Lisbon
- In office 18 October 2021 – 11 November 2025

Personal details
- Born: Rui Miguel Marcelino Tavares Pereira; 29 July 1972 (age 54) Lisbon, Portugal
- Party: LIVRE (2014–present)
- Other political affiliations: Left Bloc (2009–2011); Greens/EFA (2011–2014)
- Domestic partner: Marta Loja Neves
- Children: 2
- Education: NOVA University Lisbon; École des hautes études en sciences sociales (PhD)
- Profession: Historian; translator

Rui Miguel Marcelino Tavares Pereira (born 29 July 1972) is a Portuguese historian and politician. He has been elected Member of the Assembly of the Republic in the 2022, 2024 and 2025 legislative elections.

Tavares is one of the founders and leaders of the green political party LIVRE, established in 2014. He had previously served as an independent Member of the European Parliament, elected in 2009 for the Left Bloc.

== Early life and career ==
Rui Tavares was born in Lisbon on 29 July 1972, to a bank clerk (and occasionally shepherd) father and a homemaker mother. Tavares had two older half-siblings (born of his father's first marriage; cut short when he became a widower) and two older siblings.

The family was originally from the small rural village of Arrifana, in Azambuja, in the Ribatejo Province, where Tavares spent part of his childhood. The area had a significant labour movement background, influenced by republicanism and anarcho-syndicalism in the early 20th century: the anti-Christian spirit of the First Portuguese Republic saw the local parish priest temporarily banished from the town and, unusually for the traditionally Catholic country, it then gained a significant Evangelical Baptist population. The Protestant denomination was indirectly introduced in the town by an atheist great-uncle of Tavares, who invited a Baptist pastor to the village to spite the Catholic hierarchy.

Living with his parents and his next older brother, Tavares attended primary school in Arrifana; of his much older siblings, his sister was already married at the time, and the two other brothers were attending university, one in Lisbon and the other in Czechoslovakia (sponsored by the Portuguese Communist Youth, of which he was a member). Tavares's next older brother attended secondary school in Azambuja and used to bring him books from the school library; by his own admission, Tavares was "bookish" ever since his mother taught him how to read, and he took great pride in having read The Adventures of Tom Sawyer and Huckleberry Finn at this time "as they should be read: perched up in a tree". He became interested in politics at around age 11 or 12, when he started reading anything he could on the different political ideologies at the Municipal Library in Penha de França, and became fascinated with anarchism and left-libertarianism.

Tavares earned a licentiate in History of Art from the Faculty of Social and Human Sciences of NOVA University Lisbon in 1994, a master's degree in Social Sciences from the Institute of Social Sciences of the University of Lisbon in 1998, and a doctorate in History from the École des hautes études en sciences sociales, in Paris, in 2014. He taught at university level for two years.

== Political career ==
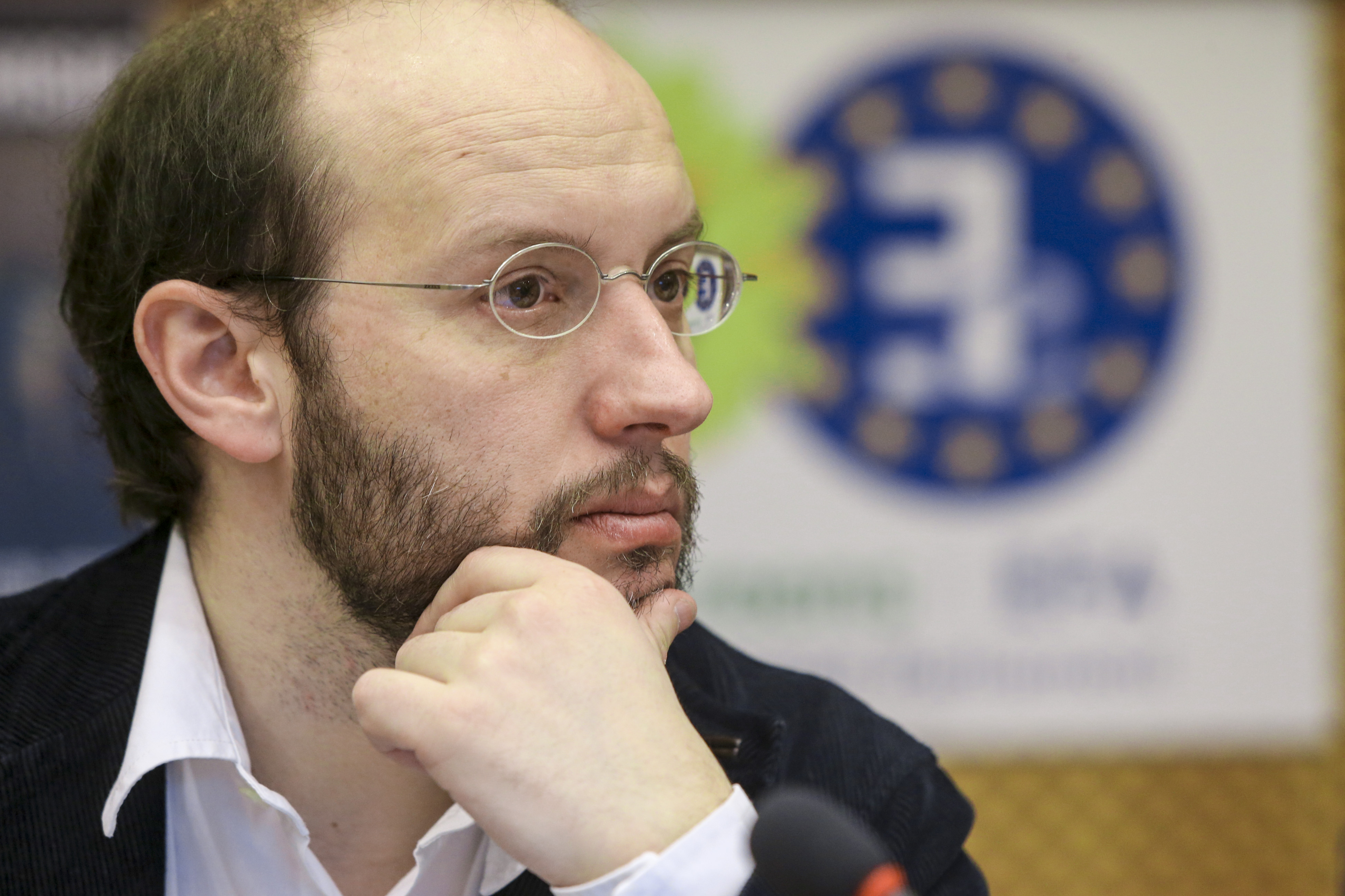
Rui Tavares, Member of the European Parliament, at a meeting of the Greens–European Free Alliance.

He was elected Member of the European Parliament in 2009 for the Left Bloc. In June 2011, Tavares became an independent within the Greens–European Free Alliance group. During his time at the European Parliament, he focused on refugee and fundamental rights issues.

=== Tavares Report ===
In June 2013, he was commissioned by the European Parliament to submit a report on Hungarian constitutional concerns. The Tavares Report urged the Hungarian authorities "to implement as swiftly as possible all the measures the European Commission as the guardian of the treaties deems necessary in order to fully comply with EU law... [and with] the decisions of the Hungarian Constitutional Court and... the recommendations of the Venice Commission, the Council of Europe and other international bodies…".

=== LIVRE ===
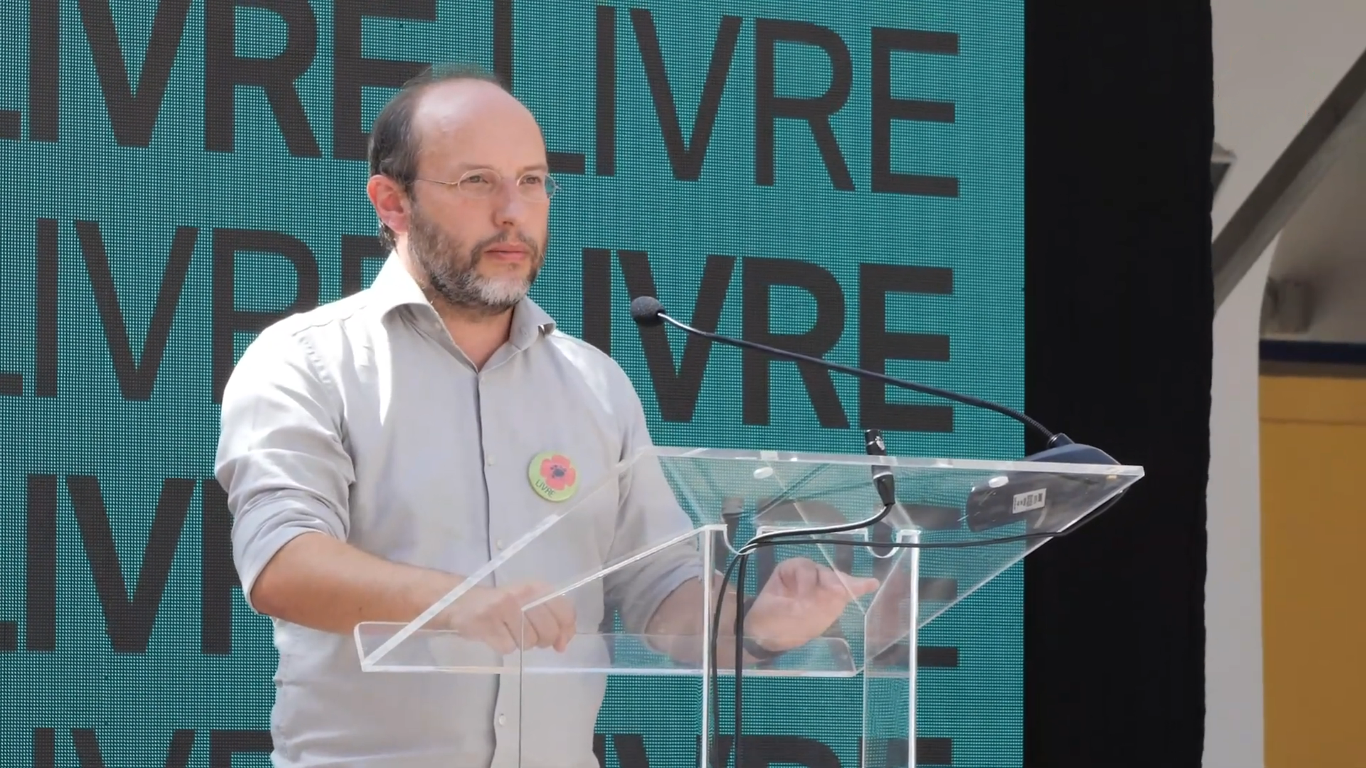
Rui Tavares speaks during the 10th Congress of LIVRE, in 2021

In 2014, he founded the new party LIVRE.

In the 2021 local elections, Tavares was elected member of the Lisbon City Council. Tavares had run alongside incumbent Mayor Fernando Medina on the electoral list of the "Mais Lisboa" coalition (Socialist Party and LIVRE), to be the councillor with the "Human Rights, Knowledge, Science, and Culture" portfolio on a Socialist-led City Council. The majority, however, was won by the "Novos Tempos" coalition (PSD/CDS–PP/Alliance/MPT/PPM); Tavares stated his intention to serve as opposition within the City Council to the new centre-right Mayor, Carlos Moedas.

Tavares was elected Member of the Assembly of the Republic in the 2022 legislative election for the Lisbon constituency. Tavares pledged to get António Costa, who was re-elected Prime Minister with an absolute majority, to work with other left-wing parties.

== Electoral history ==
=== European Parliament election, 2014 ===
Ballot: 25 May 2014
Party	Candidate	Votes	%	Seats	+/−
PS	Francisco Assis	1,034,249	31.5	8	+1
PSD/CDS–PP	Paulo Rangel	910,647	27.7	7	–3
CDU	João Ferreira	416,925	12.7	3	+1
MPT	Marinho e Pinto	234,788	7.2	2	+2
BE	Marisa Matias	149,764	4.6	1	–2
Livre	Rui Tavares	71,495	2.2	0	new
PAN	Orlando Figueiredo	56,431	1.7	0	new
PCTP/MRPP	Leopoldo Mesquita	54,708	1.7	0	±0
Other parties		111,765	3.4	0	±0
Blank/Invalid ballots		243,681	7.4	–	–
Turnout		3,284,452	33.67	21	–1
Source: Comissão Nacional de Eleições

=== European Parliament election, 2019 ===
Ballot: 26 May 2019
Party	Candidate	Votes	%	Seats	+/−
PS	Pedro Marques	1,104,694	33.4	9	+1
PSD	Paulo Rangel	725,399	21.9	6	±0
BE	Marisa Matias	325,093	9.8	2	+1
CDU	João Ferreira	228,045	6.9	2	–1
CDS–PP	Nuno Melo	204,792	6.2	1	±0
PAN	Francisco Guerreiro	168,015	5.1	1	+1
Alliance	Paulo Sande	61,652	1.9	0	new
Livre	Rui Tavares	60,446	1.8	0	±0
Basta!	André Ventura	49,388	1.5	0	new
NC	Paulo de Morais	34,634	1.1	0	new
Other parties		116,743	2.7	0	±0
Blank/Invalid ballots		235,748	3.5	–	–
Turnout		3,307,644	30.75	21	±0
Source: Comissão Nacional de Eleições

=== Legislative election, 2022 ===
Ballot: 30 January 2022
Party	Candidate	Votes	%	Seats	+/−
PS	António Costa	2,302,601	41.4	120	+12
PSD	Rui Rio	1,618,381	29.1	77	–2
Chega	André Ventura	399,659	7.2	12	+11
IL	João Cotrim Figueiredo	273,687	4.9	8	+7
BE	Catarina Martins	244,603	4.4	5	–14
CDU	Jerónimo de Sousa	238,920	4.3	6	–6
CDS–PP	Rodrigues dos Santos	89,181	1.6	0	–5
PAN	Inês Sousa Real	88,152	1.6	1	–3
Livre	Rui Tavares	71,232	1.3	1	±0
Other parties		91,299	1.6	0	±0
Blank/Invalid ballots		146,824	2.6	–	–
Turnout		5,564,539	51.46	230	±0
Source: Comissão Nacional de Eleições

=== LIVRE leadership election, 2022 ===
Ballot: 6 March 2022
Candidate	Votes	%
Teresa Mota; Rui Tavares	167	66.8
Patrícia Robalo	78	31.2
Abstention	5	2.0
Turnout	250	
Source: Official results

=== Legislative election, 2024 ===
Ballot: 10 March 2024
Party	Candidate	Votes	%	Seats	+/−
AD	Luís Montenegro	1,867,442	28.8	80	+3
PS	Pedro Nuno Santos	1,812,443	28.0	78	–42
Chega	André Ventura	1,169,781	18.1	50	+38
IL	Rui Rocha	319,877	4.9	8	±0
BE	Mariana Mortágua	282,314	4.4	5	±0
CDU	Paulo Raimundo	205,551	3.2	4	–2
Livre	Rui Tavares	204,875	3.2	4	+3
PAN	Inês Sousa Real	126,125	2.0	1	±0
ADN	Bruno Fialho	102,134	1.6	0	±0
Other parties		104,167	1.6	0	±0
Blank/Invalid ballots		282,243	4.4	–	–
Turnout		6,476,952	59.90	230	±0
Source: Comissão Nacional de Eleições

=== LIVRE leadership election, 2024 ===
Ballot: 12 May 2024
Candidate	Votes	%
Isabel Mendes Lopes; Rui Tavares	240	60.9
Natércia Lopes	86	21.8
João Manso	56	14.2
Abstention	12	3.0
Turnout	394	
Source: Official results

=== Legislative election, 2025 ===
Ballot: 18 May 2025
Party	Candidate	Votes	%	Seats	+/−
AD	Luís Montenegro	2,008,488	31.8	91	+11
PS	Pedro Nuno Santos	1,442,546	22.8	58	–20
Chega	André Ventura	1,438,554	22.8	60	+10
IL	Rui Rocha	338,974	5.4	9	+1
Livre	Rui Tavares	257,291	4.1	6	+2
CDU	Paulo Raimundo	183,686	2.9	3	–1
BE	Mariana Mortágua	125,808	2.0	1	–4
PAN	Inês Sousa Real	86,930	1.4	1	±0
ADN	Bruno Fialho	81,660	1.3	0	±0
Other parties		95,384	1.5	1	+1
Blank/Invalid ballots		260,648	4.1	–	–
Turnout		6,319,969	58.25	230	±0
Source: Comissão Nacional de Eleições
