= Green European Journal =

Magazine published in Belgium

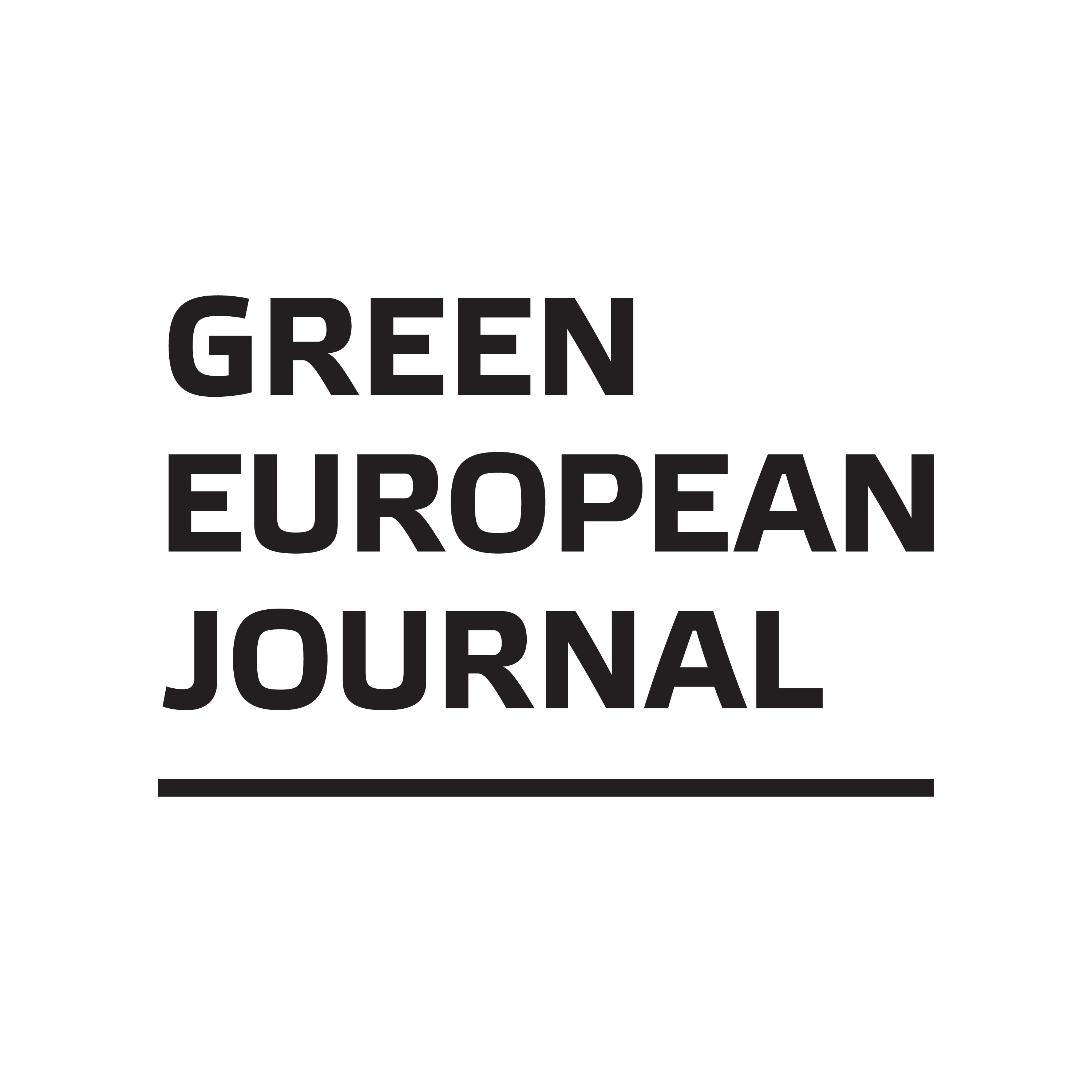
- Editor: Alessio Giussani
- Categories: Political Ecology, Green Politics, Progressive Politics
- Frequency: Biannual
- Publisher: Green European Foundation
- Founded: 2012
- First issue: February 2012
- Country: Belgium
- Based in: Brussels
- Language: English + 27 languages
- Website: www.greeneuropeanjournal.eu
- ISSN: 2684-4486

The Green European Journal is an online and biannual print magazine that publishes analysis, debates, and interviews on political ecology, current affairs, and topics of significance to the green movement. The journal is published in English and offers translations in 28 languages.

== Overview ==
The magazine was established in 2012, with the objective of providing a venue for European-level debate amongst the green movement in Europe.

Supported by the European Parliament., the Green European Journal is linked to but editorially independent from the Green European Foundation.

Although based in Brussels, Belgium, the magazine covers analysis on a European-wide context. It has various partner organisations and publications in different European countries, including Bright Green, Krytyka Polityczna, and the Heinrich Böll Foundation, among others.

== Print edition ==
The Green European Journal’s printed editions take an in-depth look at a given topic and appear about two times a year. The first issue published in 2012 focussed on the European economic crisis. Subsequent issues have covered various topics, including climate change, degrowth, agriculture, security, COVID-19, among others.

The print issues are designed by Claire Allard and feature illustrations by the Belgian illustrator Klaas Verplancke. They are available to read online and order in print.

== Online media ==
The magazine publishes articles online throughout the year on its website on a variety of topics ranging from the Green New Deal and decolonial ecology to the geopolitics of climate breakdown. It publishes predominately in English along with articles and translations in 28 other languages.

== Podcast ==
The magazine also publishes audio versions of selected articles in the form of a podcast titled Green Wave. It was listed as one of the best podcasts on EU politics by policylab.eu. It is available on all podcast platforms to listen to and download.

== Notable Contributors ==
Notable authors whose work has been published in the Green European Journal include Vandana Shiva, Amitav Ghosh, Rosi Braidotti, Ulrike Guérot, Michel Bauwens, Natalie Bennett, Daniel Cohn-Bendit, Olivier De Schutter, Cory Doctorow, Joschka Fischer, David Graeber, Chantal Mouffe, Kate Raworth, and Yanis Varoufakis.

== Awards ==
The Green European Journal has been awarded the House of eu. and was recognized as one of the best .eu websites of 2019 by EURid.
