= Teresa Mota =

Portuguese researcher and politician

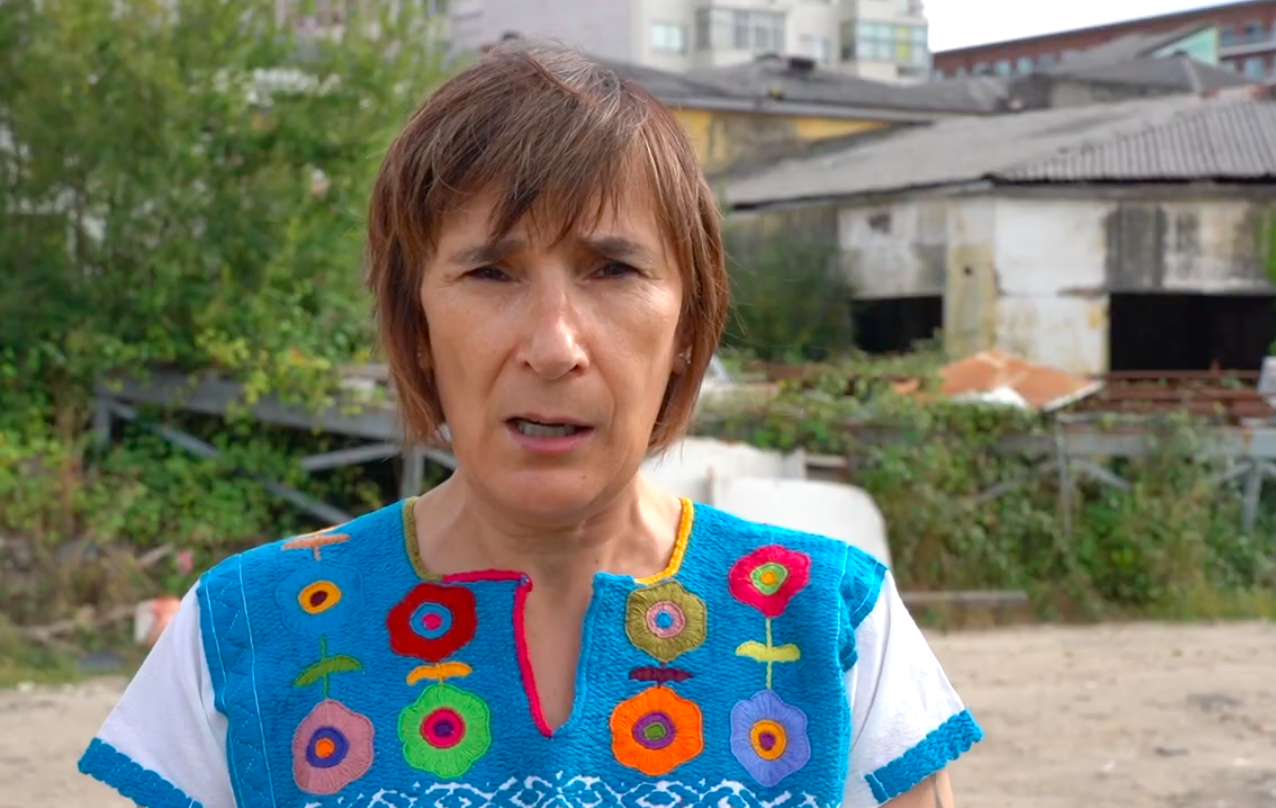
Teresa Mota

Teresa Salomé Mota (born 1964/1965) is a Portuguese researcher and politician who served as co-Spokesperson of LIVRE from March 2022 to May 2024, along with the party's sole deputy Rui Tavares.

She was firstly a candidate for the European Parliament in 2019, in the 16th place of LIVRE's list, later being the main candidate from Braga in the same year's legislative election. In 2021, she was LIVRE's candidate for Mayor of Braga, only gaining 0,6% of the votes. She was once again the main candidate from Braga in the 2022 and 2024 legislative elections.
