= Joacine Katar Moreira =

Portuguese politician

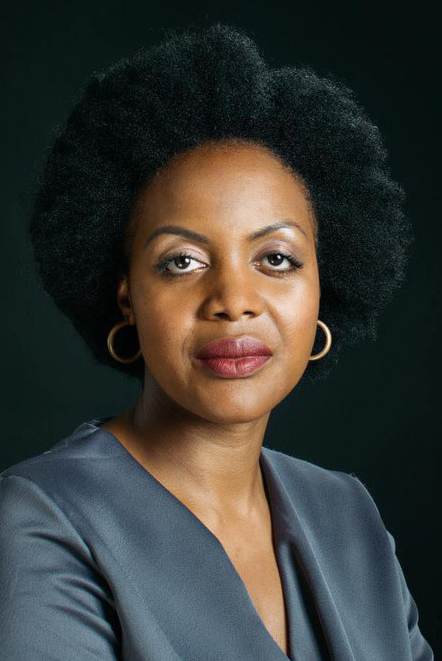

Member of the Assembly of the Republic
- In office 25 October 2019 – 29 March 2022
- Constituency: Lisbon

Personal details
- Born: Joacine Elysees Katar Tavares Moreira; 27 July 1982 (age 44) Bissau, Guinea-Bissau
- Citizenship: Guinea-Bissau; Portugal (since 2003)
- Party: CDU (since 2022)
- Other political affiliations: LIVRE (2018–2020); Independent (2020–2022)
- Children: 1
- Occupation: Researcher; activist; politician

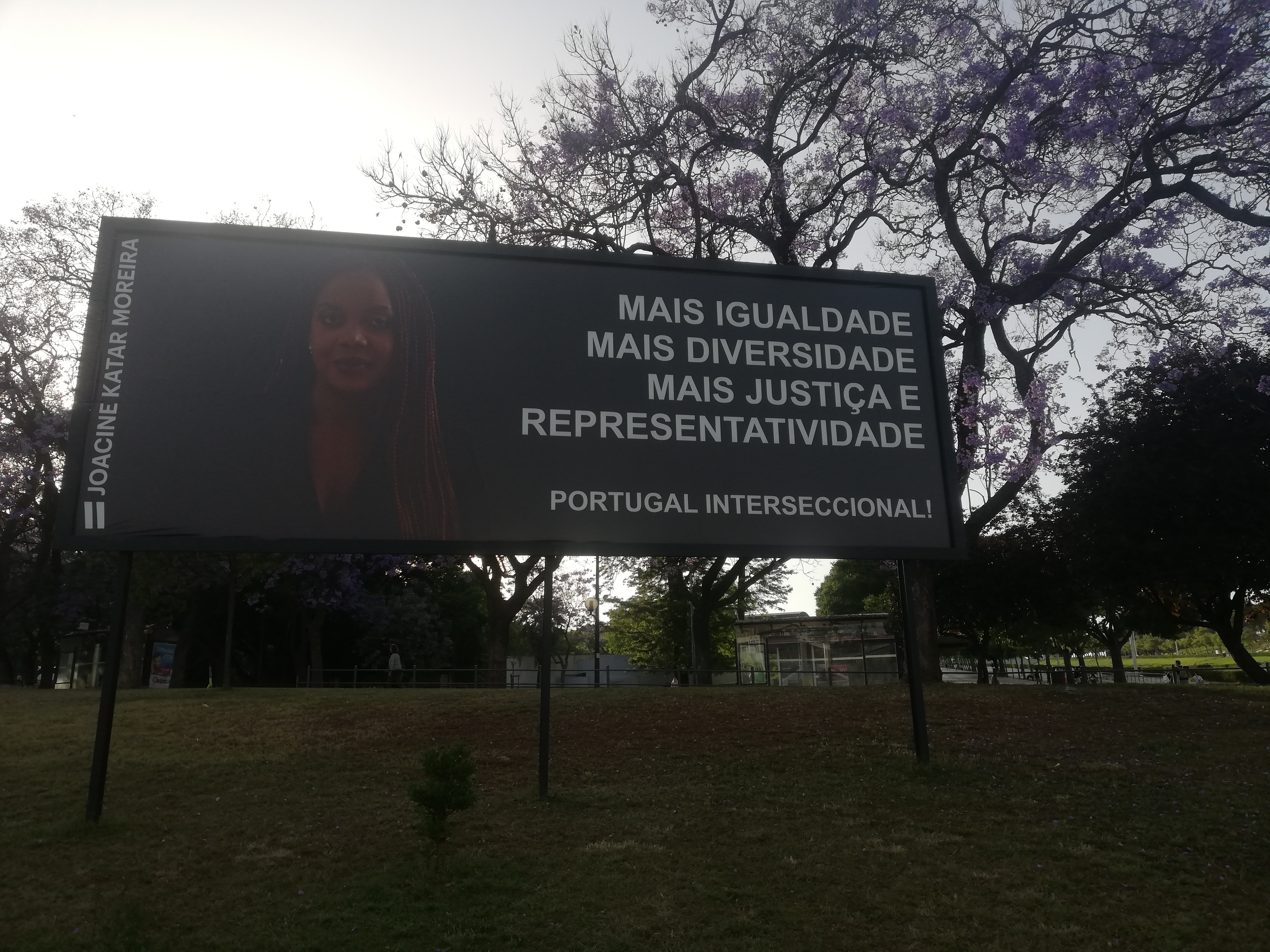
Billboard promoting Moreira in Lisbon — "more equality, more diversity, more justice and representativeness; Intersectional Portugal!"

Joacine Elysees Katar Tavares Moreira (born 27 July 1982) is a Bissau-Guinean-born Portuguese academic, activist and politician.

She was elected to the Assembly of the Republic as a member of the Livre party in 2019. However, in early 2020 the party removed its political confidence in her, making her a non-attached member until the end of the legislature in 2022.

== Early life and education ==
Born on 27 July 1982 in Guinea-Bissau, Katar Moreira has lived in Portugal since she was eight years old.

She acquired Portuguese citizenship through naturalization in 2003.

Katar Moreira earned a university degree in Modern and Contemporary History. She later obtained a master's degree in development studies and a PhD in African Studies. Founder of the Institute of Black Women in Portugal (INMUNE), she was the first black woman to head a party list in a Portuguese legislative election, namely Livre's electoral list for the 2019 election in Lisbon.

== Political career ==
In 2019, Katar Moreira was elected member of the Assembly of the Republic, and her party thus earned its first seat at the Portuguese parliament since its creation in 2014. At the same time, she was one of three black members of parliament. Since joining the parliament, she has presented various policy proposals on tackling racism and colonial legacies in Portugal. Among other initiatives, she proposed in 2020 that items in Portuguese museums obtained from former colonies should be returned to their countries of origin. Because of this André Ventura leader of Chega provoked an outcry in Parliament by saying that Katar Moreira, should be "sent back to her country of origin. It would be a lot better for everyone".

Livre removed its political confidence from Katar Moreira after a party caucus in January 2020, citing communication and coordination issues with its deputy and accusing Katar Moreira of separating herself from the party "immediately after the election". This made Joacine the only deputy without a party (Deputada não inscrita) until Cristina Rodrigues decided to leave People-Animals-Nature in late June 2020.
