= Eduardo Ferro Rodrigues =

Portuguese politician (born 1949)

His Excellency Eduardo Ferro Rodrigues GCC GCL
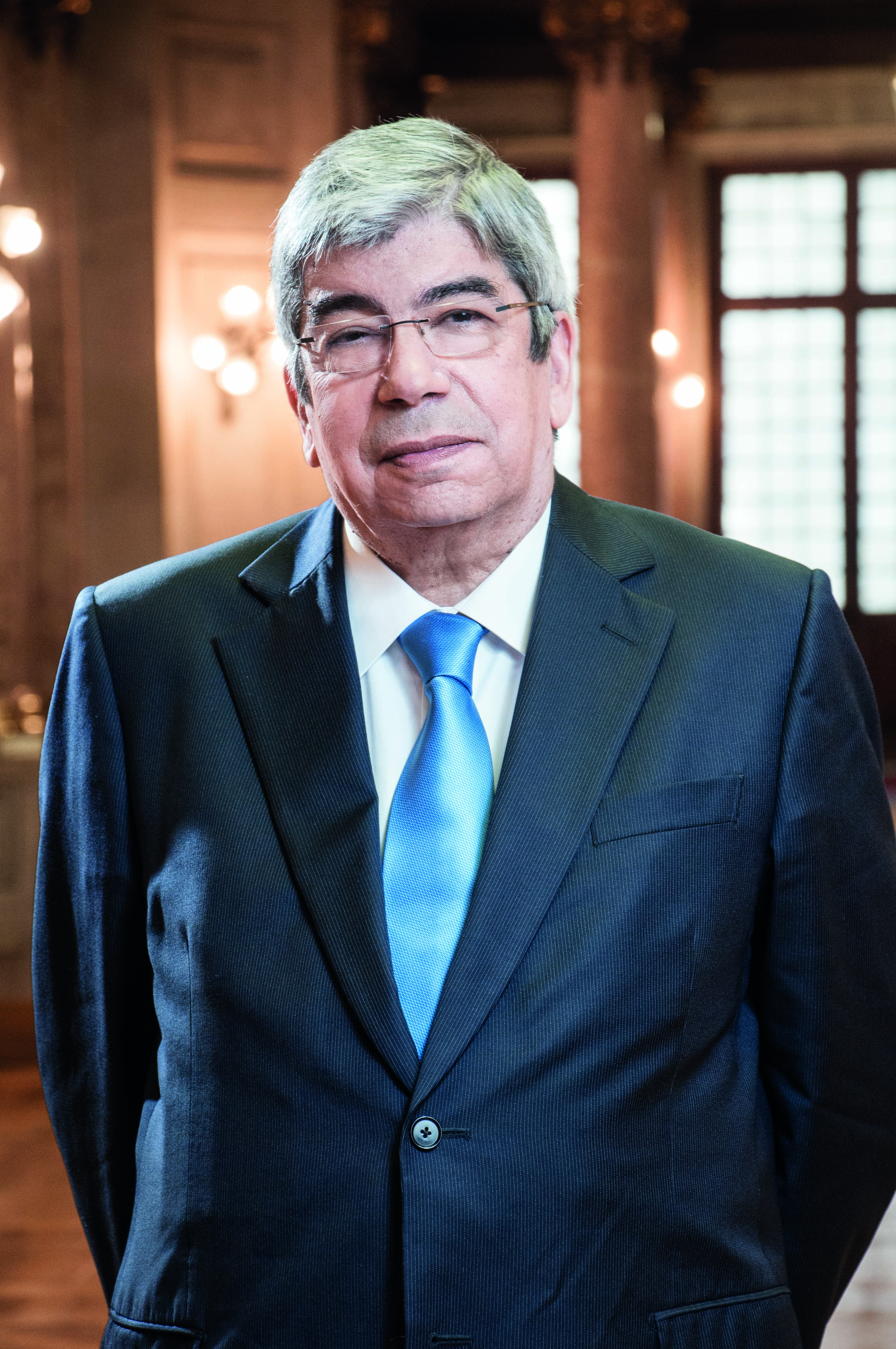

President of the Assembly of the Republic
- In office 23 October 2015 – 29 March 2022
- Preceded by: Assunção Esteves
- Succeeded by: Augusto Santos Silva

President of the Parliamentary Group of the Socialist Party
- In office 3 October 2014 – 22 October 2015
- Preceded by: Alberto Martins
- Succeeded by: Carlos César

Secretary-General of the Socialist Party
- In office 21 January 2002 – 27 September 2004
- President: António de Almeida Santos
- Preceded by: António Guterres
- Succeeded by: José Sócrates

Minister of Social Infrastructure
- In office 10 March 2001 – 23 January 2002
- Prime Minister: António Guterres
- Preceded by: Jorge Coelho
- Succeeded by: José Sócrates

Minister of Labour and Solidarity
- In office 25 November 1997 – 10 March 2001
- Prime Minister: António Guterres
- Preceded by: Maria João Rodrigues (Training and Employment)
- Succeeded by: Paulo Pedroso

Minister of Solidarity and Social Security
- In office 28 October 1995 – 25 November 1997
- Prime Minister: António Guterres
- Preceded by: José Falcão e Cunha (Employment and Social Security)
- Succeeded by: Office abolished

Member of the Assembly of the Republic
- In office 4 November 1985 – 28 March 2022
- Constituency: Lisbon (1985–1987); Aveiro (1987–1991); Lisbon (1991–1999); Leiria (1999–2002); Lisbon (2002–2022)

Personal details
- Born: Eduardo Luís Barreto Ferro Rodrigues; 3 November 1949 (age 76) Lisbon, Portugal
- Party: Socialist Party (since 1986)
- Other political affiliations: Movement of Socialist Left (formerly); GDUP (formerly)
- Spouse: Maria Filomena Lopes Peixoto de Aguilar
- Children: 2, including Rita Ferro Rodrigues
- Education: School of Economics and Finance, Technical University of Lisbon

Eduardo Luís Barreto Ferro Rodrigues GCC GCL (born 3 November 1949) is a Portuguese politician and economist who had been President of the Assembly of the Republic since 2015 until 29 March 2022, in the 13th (2015–2019) and 14th Legislatures (2019–2022). He was Minister for Social Security, and later Minister for Public Works, in the governments of António Guterres.

== Early life and education ==
Born in Lisbon, he obtained the degree of licenciado in economics at what today is the Instituto Superior de Economia e Gestão (ISEG) of Lisbon University, and is a lecturer in economics at ISCTE - University Institute of Lisbon.

== Political career ==
In the 1970s, he was a co-founder of Movimento de Esquerda Socialista (MES).

In 2002, Ferro Rodrigues was elected Secretary-General of the Portuguese Socialist Party, a position he retained for two years. He resigned on 9 July 2004, immediately after President Jorge Sampaio announced a decision not to hold early elections when Prime Minister José Manuel Barroso stepped down from office in order to be appointed President of the European Commission. Shortly after, Rodrigues was appointed as Ambassador, Permanent Representative of Portugal to the OECD.

Following the October 2015 parliamentary election, he was elected as President of the Assembly of the Republic on 23 October 2015 with the support of the Socialists, the Communists and the Left Bloc. Ferro received 120 votes against 108 votes for the candidate of the centre-right government.

After the 2019 parliamentary election, Ferro Rodrigues was re-elected as President of the Assembly of the Republic, receiving 178 votes in favor.

== Family ==
He is married to Maria Filomena Lopes Peixoto de Aguilar. The couple has a son, João Luís de Aguilar Ferro Rodrigues, and a daughter, television presenter Rita Ferro Rodrigues.

== Honours ==
=== Portuguese honours ===
- Grand Cross of the Order of Christ (21 April 2022)
- Grand Cross of the Order of Liberty (5 October 2016)

== Electoral history ==
=== PS leadership election, 2002 ===
Ballot: 18 and 19 January 2002
Candidate	Votes	%
Eduardo Ferro Rodrigues		96.5
Paulo Penedos		2.7
Blank/Invalid ballots		0.8
Turnout		
Source: Acção Socialista

=== Legislative election, 2002 ===
Ballot: 17 March 2002
Party	Candidate	Votes	%	Seats	+/−
PSD	José Manuel Durão Barroso	2,200,765	40.2	105	+24
PS	Eduardo Ferro Rodrigues	2,068,584	37.8	96	–19
CDS–PP	Paulo Portas	477,350	8.7	14	–1
CDU	Carlos Carvalhas	379,870	6.9	12	–5
BE	Francisco Louçã	153,877	2.8	3	+1
Other parties		88,542	1.6	0	±0
Blank/Invalid ballots		107,774	2.0	–	–
Turnout		5,473,655	61.48	230	±0
Source: Comissão Nacional de Eleições

=== President of the Assembly of the Republic election, 2015 ===
Ballot: 23 October 2015
Candidate	Votes	%
Eduardo Ferro Rodrigues	120	52.2
Fernando Negrão	108	47.0
Blank/Invalid ballots	2	0.9
Turnout	230	
Source: Results

=== President of the Assembly of the Republic election, 2019 ===
Ballot: 25 October 2019
Candidate	Votes	%
Eduardo Ferro Rodrigues	178	77.4
Blank/Invalid ballots	52	22.6
Turnout	230	
Source: Results

=== Foreign honours ===
- Argentina: Grand Cross of the Order of May (18 June 2003)
- Greece: Grand Cross of the Order of Honour (21 April 2017)
- Spain: Knight Grand Cross of the Order of Charles III (25 November 2016)

Party political offices
Preceded by António Guterres	Secretary-General of the Socialist Party; 2002–2004	Succeeded by José Sócrates
Political offices
Preceded by Maria João Rodrigues	Minister of Labour and Solidarity; 1997–2001	Succeeded by Paulo Pedroso
Preceded by Jorge Coelho	Minister of Social Infrastructure; 2001–2002	Succeeded by José Sócrates
Preceded by Assunção Esteves	President of the Assembly of the Republic; 2015–2022	Succeeded by Augusto Santos Silva
