= Fernando Negrão =

Portuguese judge

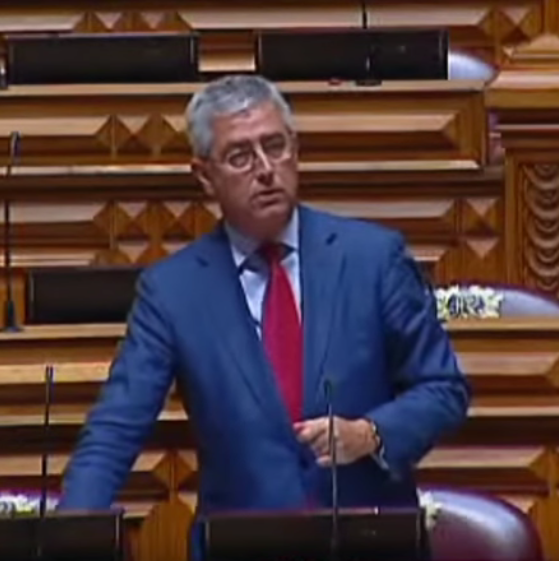
Fernando Negrão

Fernando Mimoso Negrão (born 29 November 1955) is a Portuguese jurist and politician.

Born in Portuguese Angola, he graduated in Law from the University of Lisbon in 1980 and spent his career around the country as a Portuguese Air Force official, magistrate and judge. From 1995 to 1999 he headed the Polícia Judiciária.

A member of the Social Democratic Party (PSD), he was elected to the Assembly of the Republic in the 2002 election as head of their list for Faro. From 2004 to 2005, in the government of Pedro Santana Lopes, he was the Minister for Social Security, Family and Children. In the XX Constitutional Government of Portugal, led by Pedro Passos Coelho from 30 October to 26 November 2015, Negrão was Minister of Justice.

In October 2015, Negrão ran for President of the Assembly, losing 120–108 to the Socialist Party candidate Eduardo Ferro Rodrigues.

On 22 February 2018, Negrão was elected the PSD's parliamentary leader with 39% of the votes (35 of 88).
