= Moisés Ferreira (politician) =

Portuguese psychologist and politician

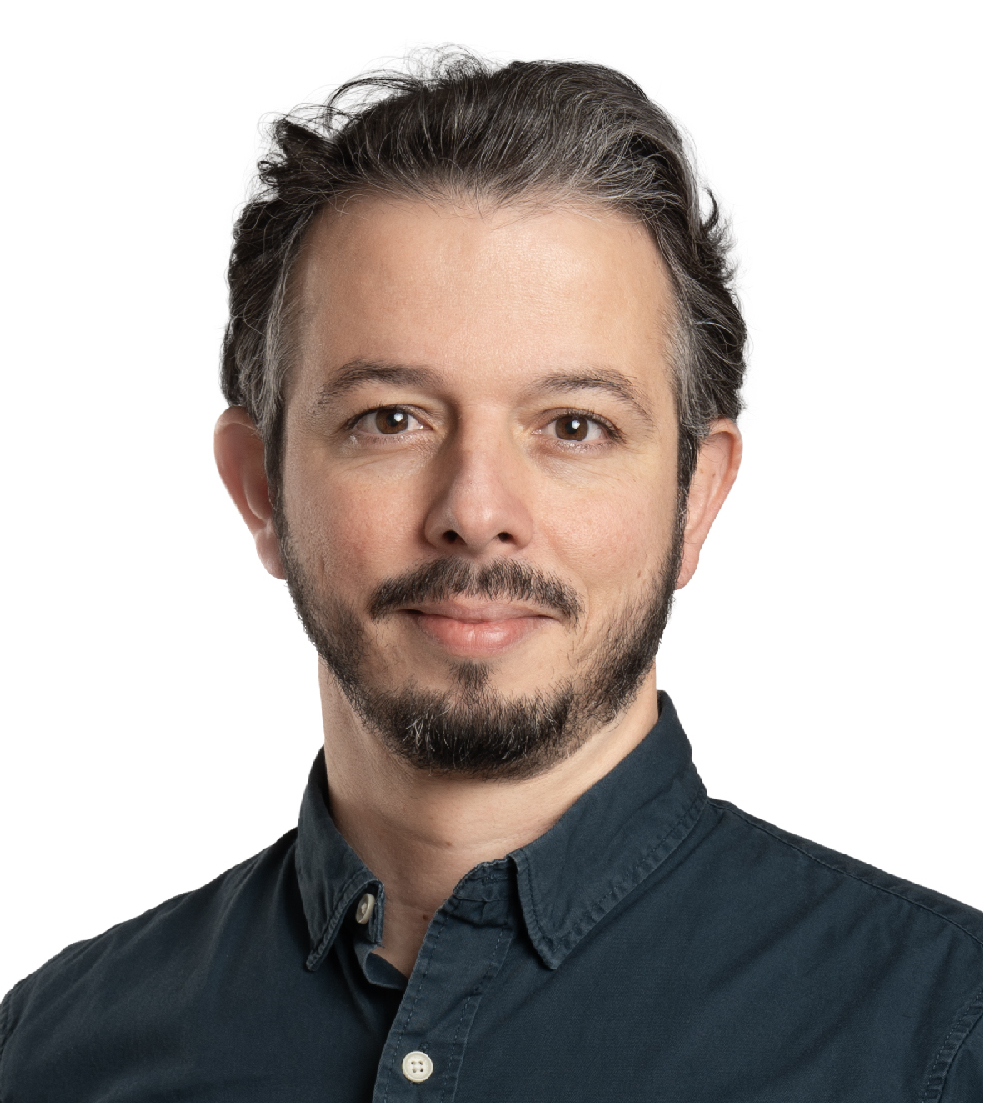
- Moisés Ferreira in 2024.

Member of the Assembly of the Republic
- In office 23 October 2015 – 28 March 2022
- Constituency: Aveiro

Personal details
- Born: Moisés Salvador Coelho Ferreira; 25 December 1985 (age 40) São João da Madeira, Aveiro District, Portugal
- Party: Left Bloc
- Occupation: Politician
- Profession: Psychologist

Moisés Salvador Coelho Ferreira (born 25 December 1985) is a Portuguese psychologist and politician, who was a member of the Assembly of the Republic, first elected in 2015.

== Biography ==
He holds a licentiate degree in psychology and completed coursework for a master's degree in the Psychology of Vocational Training and Lifelong Learning.

At the age of 19, he ran as a candidate for the Municipal Chamber of São João da Madeira during the 2005 local elections.

He was elected as a member of parliament representing the Aveiro constituency in the 2015 legislative elections, and was re-elected in 2019. In the 2022 legislative elections, he again ran as the head of the Left Bloc list for Aveiro, but failed to win re-election amid a broader electoral defeat for his party.
