= LIVRE =

Green political party in Portugal

FREE LIVRE
- Abbreviation: L
- Spokespersons: Isabel Mendes Lopes; Jorge Pinto
- Founded: 31 January 2014
- Legalised: 20 March 2014
- Headquarters: Rua Marcos Portugal, n.º 22-A 1200–258 Lisboa Lisbon
- Think tank: Instituto José Tengarrinha
- Membership (2026): 4500
- Ideology: Green politics; Social democracy; Libertarian socialism; Liberal socialism; Left-libertarianism; Pro-Europeanism
- Political position: Centre-left to left-wing
- European affiliation: European Green Party (since 2023)
- European Parliament group: Greens/EFA
- European political alliance: European Spring (2018–2019); DiEM25 (2016–2019)
- Colours: Green; Red
- Assembly of the Republic: 6 / 230
- European Parliament: 0 / 21
- Regional parliaments: 0 / 104
- Local government (Mayors): 0 / 308
- Local government (Parishes): 0 / 3,216

Election symbol
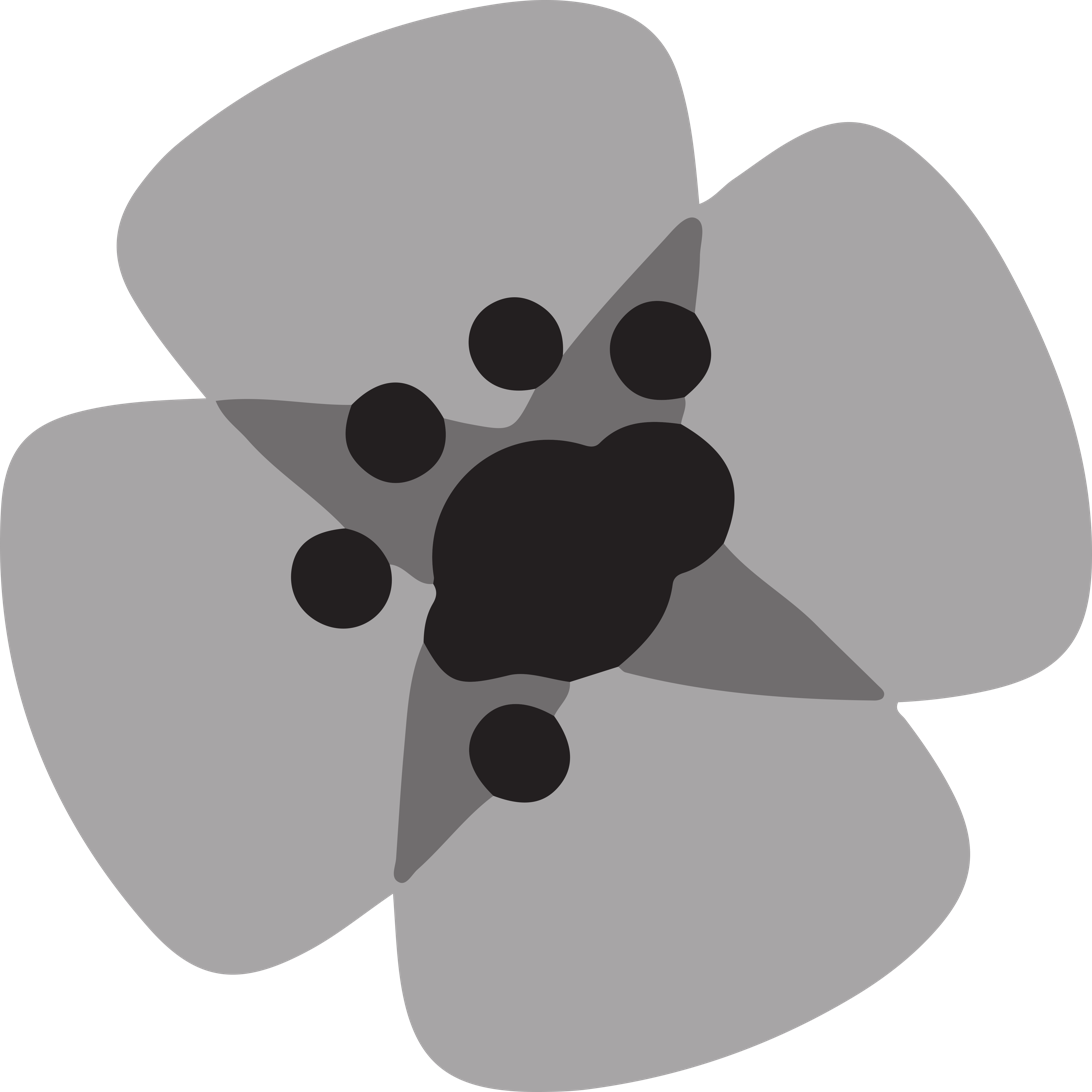

Party flag
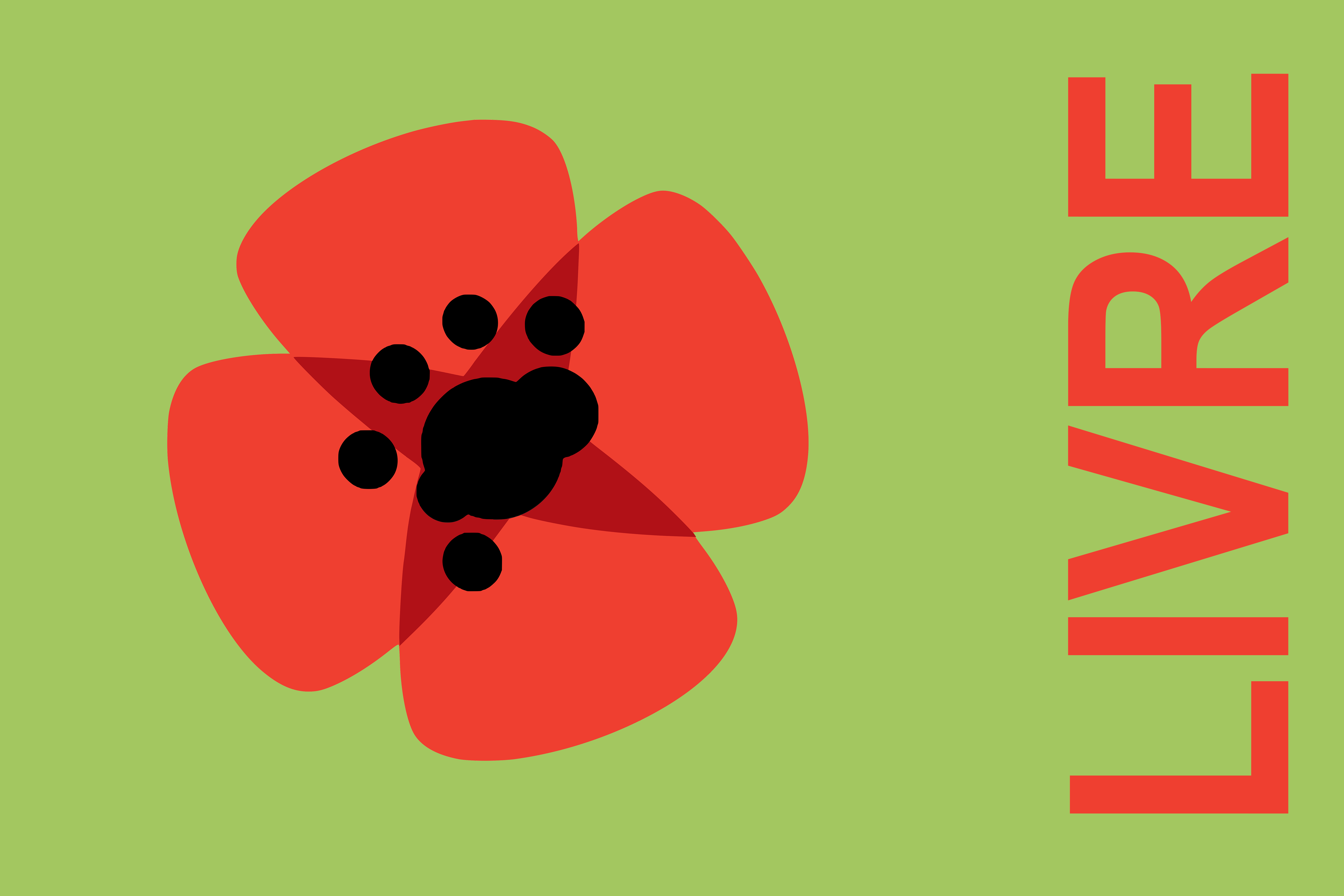

Website
- partidolivre.pt

LIVRE (L; lit. 'FREE', officially stylized as LiVRE), temporarily known as LIVRE/Tempo de Avançar (lit. 'FREE/Time to Move Forward', L/TDA), is a green left-wing Portuguese political party, founded in 2014. Its founding principles are ecology, universalism, freedom, equality, solidarity, socialism, and pro-Europeanism.

== History ==
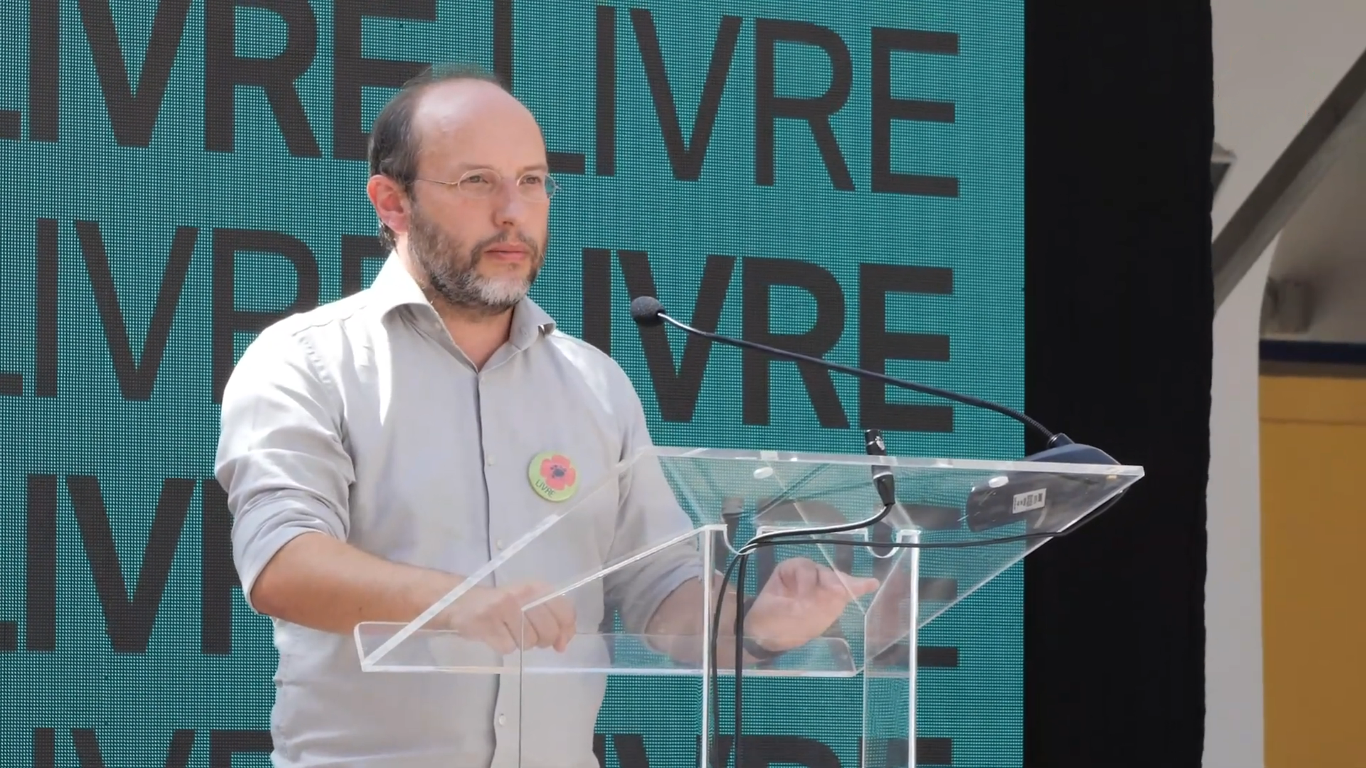
Rui Tavares, founder of LIVRE, during its 10th Congress in 2021

In 2011, Left Bloc's Independent MEP Rui Tavares departed the party's group due to disagreements with coordinator Francisco Louçã and began sitting as an independent in European Parliament. Tavares also left the Left Bloc's European Parliament group, GUE-NGL, and began sitting with Greens–European Free Alliance.

In 2014, ahead of that year's European elections, LIVRE was formed, with Tavares being its most notable founder. Its founding congress was 31 January. The party was legalised by the Portuguese Constitutional Court on 20 March 2014. On 20 May 2015, it officially changed its name LIVRE to LIVRE/Tempo de Avançar, with L/TDA as its abbreviation. This change was made in order to run for the 2015 legislative election in a broad coalition with the citizen platform Tempo de Avançar, as only political parties can run in legislative elections. It switched back to its original name a few years later. Its symbol is a poppy.

In the 2019 legislative election the party entered parliament for the first time, with Joacine Katar Moreira as their sole MP. After several clashes between Katar Moreira and the party's leadership, including accusations that LIVRE only used her to achieve the state mandated subvention due to her being a black woman, and Katar Moreira's claim that the election was "won" only by her the party expelled her from their caucus on 31 January 2020, losing all representation in the Assembly of the Republic.

During the campaign for the 2022 legislative election, Rui Tavares, once again the main candidate from LIVRE, was able to appear in the televised debates due to the party having elected one MP during the previous election. Rui Tavares was elected as the party's sole MP, with LIVRE regaining representation in parliament.

During the 2024 legislative election, LIVRE increased their result to 3.2% and elected four MPs: Rui Tavares, Isabel Mendes Lopes (who became the first Parliamentary leader of LIVRE), Jorge Pinto and Paulo Muacho.

In the same year, LIVRE selected Francisco Paupério as the main candidate for the 2024 European Parliament election after his victory in the party primaries, a result that caused some internal turmoil in the party after allegations of electoral fraud. Rui Tavares was later criticized for not being as present as other party leaders in the party's campaign for the European elections. In the end, LIVRE achieved 3.8% of the votes, their best result at that point, but failed to elect any MEPs.

In the 2025 legislative election, LIVRE once again rose to 4.1% of the votes and elected six MPs, this time also taking Filipa Pinto and Patrícia Gonçalves to parliament, with LIVRE becoming the largest party to the left of the Socialist Party. In the local elections, LIVRE managed to elect about 50 local representatives, having kept one city councillor in Lisbon within a PS/LIVRE/BE/PAN coalition, Carlos Teixeira.

Later that year, the party presented its first own presidential candidate for the following year's presidential election, Jorge Pinto. He achieved a very poor result, winning just 0.7% of the votes and coming in ninth place, behind all left-wing candidates and even satirical candidate Manuel João Vieira, with the party endorsing António José Seguro for the second round against André Ventura on election night.

In July 2026, before the party's congress, Rui Tavares announced he wasn't seeking another term as co-spokesperson, despite keeping open the idea of being once again the party's main candidate in the legislative elections. He was replaced by Isabel Mendes Lopes and Jorge Pinto.

== Organization ==
=== Contact Group ===
The party's political responsibilities are divided between two main organs, both elected for two-year terms in the party congress: the Contact Group, composed of 15 people elected through lists, is responsible for the executive functioning of the party

Isabel Mendes Lopes (co-spokesperson); Jorge Pinto (co-spokesperson); Rui Tavares; Inês Pires; Tomás Cardoso Pereira; Nurin Mirzan; Henrique Vasconcelos; Ana Gomes de Almeida	Rodrigo Teixeira; Rosa Vale; Bruno Pedrosa; Rodrigo Brito; Sara Paralta; Rui Dinis; Tiago Mota

=== Assembly ===
The Assembly, composed of 50 people (with gender parity) elected through individual candidacies, is responsible for determining the political positioning of the party.

Filipa Pinto; Patrícia Gonçalves; Safaa Dib; Filipe Honório; Patrícia Robalo; Hélder Verdade Fontes; André Dias; Carlos Teixeira; Ana Natário; Mafalda Dâmaso; Natércia Rodrigues Lopes; Hélder Sousa; Joana Filipe	João Lourenço Monteiro; Isabel Faria; Bernardo Marta; Ofélia Janeiro; André Tenente; Raquel Pichel; Rita Paixão; Joana Alves Pereira; Rúben Vieira; Salomé Gomes; Daniel Ferreira; Diamantino Raposinho; Francisco Costa	Jorge Oliveira Araújo; Madalena Lemos Lorga; Sílvia Vilas; Levi Galaio; André Chichorro; Fausto Fialho; Adriana Castro; Pedro Pinheiro; Flávio Oliveira; Joana Pereira Gonçalves; Mário Barreira; Carolina Rodrigues	Joana Loureiro; Max Falcão; Filipe Rodrigues Fonseca; Sónia Sapinho; Teresa Leitão; Margarida Santos; Vítor Madureira; Pedro Leitão; Hugo Rajão; Rui Simões; Sílvia Pais; Diogo Mota Duarte

=== Leadership positions ===
==== Co-spokesperson of the Contact Group ====
Unlike most parties in the Portuguese landscape, LIVRE does not have a fixed leadership role, having rotating roles such as a male-female spokesperson duo from the Contact Group and a coordinator of the assembly's board. Given that both organs have term limits and no person can serve in one organ more than three consecutive terms, they are considered rotating roles.

Co-spokesperson	Co-spokesperson	Start of term	End of term	Prime Minister
No co-spokesperson		1 February 2014	20 December 2015	Pedro Passos Coelho (2011–2015)
No co-spokesperson		1 February 2014	20 December 2015	António Costa (2015–2024)
No co-spokesperson		20 December 2015	20 January 2018	António Costa (2015–2024)
No co-spokesperson		20 January 2018	19 January 2020	António Costa (2015–2024)
Pedro Mendonça	Isabel Mendes Lopes	19 January 2020	6 March 2022	António Costa (2015–2024)
Rui Tavares	Teresa Mota	6 March 2022	12 May 2024	António Costa (2015–2024)
Rui Tavares	Teresa Mota	6 March 2022	12 May 2024	Luís Montenegro (since 2024)
Rui Tavares	Isabel Mendes Lopes	12 May 2024	12 July 2026	Luís Montenegro (since 2024)
Jorge Pinto	Isabel Mendes Lopes	12 July 2026	present	Luís Montenegro (since 2024)

=== Elected politicians ===
==== Members of the Assembly of the Republic ====
17th Legislature (2025 – present)
- Rui Tavares (Lisbon)
- Isabel Mendes Lopes (Lisbon)
  Tomás Cardoso Pereira – from March 2026 to April 2026
- Patrícia Gonçalves (Lisbon)
- Jorge Pinto (Porto)
- Filipa Pinto (Porto)
- Paulo Muacho (Setúbal)
16th Legislature (2024 – 2025)
- Rui Tavares (Lisbon)
- Isabel Mendes Lopes (Lisbon)
- Jorge Pinto (Porto)
  Filipa Pinto – from October 2024 to January 2025
- Paulo Muacho (Setúbal)
15th Legislature (2022 – 2024)
- Rui Tavares (Lisbon)
14th Legislature (2019 – 2022)
- Joacine Katar Moreira (Lisbon) – became independent in February 2020

=== Candidates selection ===
==== 2015 legislative election ====
Primaries for the 2015 legislative election were held on 24 June 2015. Party founder Rui Tavares was selected as the main candidate in Lisbon, with former deputy Ana Drago coming in second place.

Meanwhile, the primary for Porto was filled with controversy, after the first ballot selected Daniel Mota as the main candidate, with former Secretary of State Ricardo Sá Fernandes coming in third place. A recount was held, with Sá Fernandes coming in first place, while Daniel Mota fell to 11th place following the annulment of 46 votes. This led the Intervention and Citizenship Movement (MIC), founded by Manuel Alegre following the 2006 presidential election, to withdraw from LIVRE/Time to move forward.

==== 2016 presidential election ====
On 26 June 2015, LIVRE held an internal referendum to decide who the party would support in the 2016 presidential election, counting only as valid votes candidates that had already presented their candidacy. On the ballot, 79.7% of the party members were in favour of the party supporting a candidate, while 65% voted in favour of supporting former Rector of the University of Lisbon António Sampaio da Nóvoa.

Ballot: 26 June 2015
Candidate	Votes	%
António Sampaio da Nóvoa		64.9
Paulo de Morais		5.3
Henrique Neto		3.0
Graça Castanho		0.2
Cândido Ferreira		0.1
Blank/invalid ballots		25.5
Turnout		
Source: Results

==== 2017 local elections ====
Primaries were held on 8 July 2017 to select the candidates for the 2017 local elections in Lisbon, Oeiras and Ponta Delgada. In Lisbon, Isabel Mendes Lopes was selected as the main candidate for the City Council and Paulo Muacho for the Municipal Assembly, with LIVRE being integrated in the Socialist Party's lists, led by Fernando Medina. In Oeiras, Safaa Dib was the party's candidate for Mayor and in Ponta Delgada the party's mayoral candidate was José Manuel Azevedo.

==== 2019 European Parliament election & legislative election ====
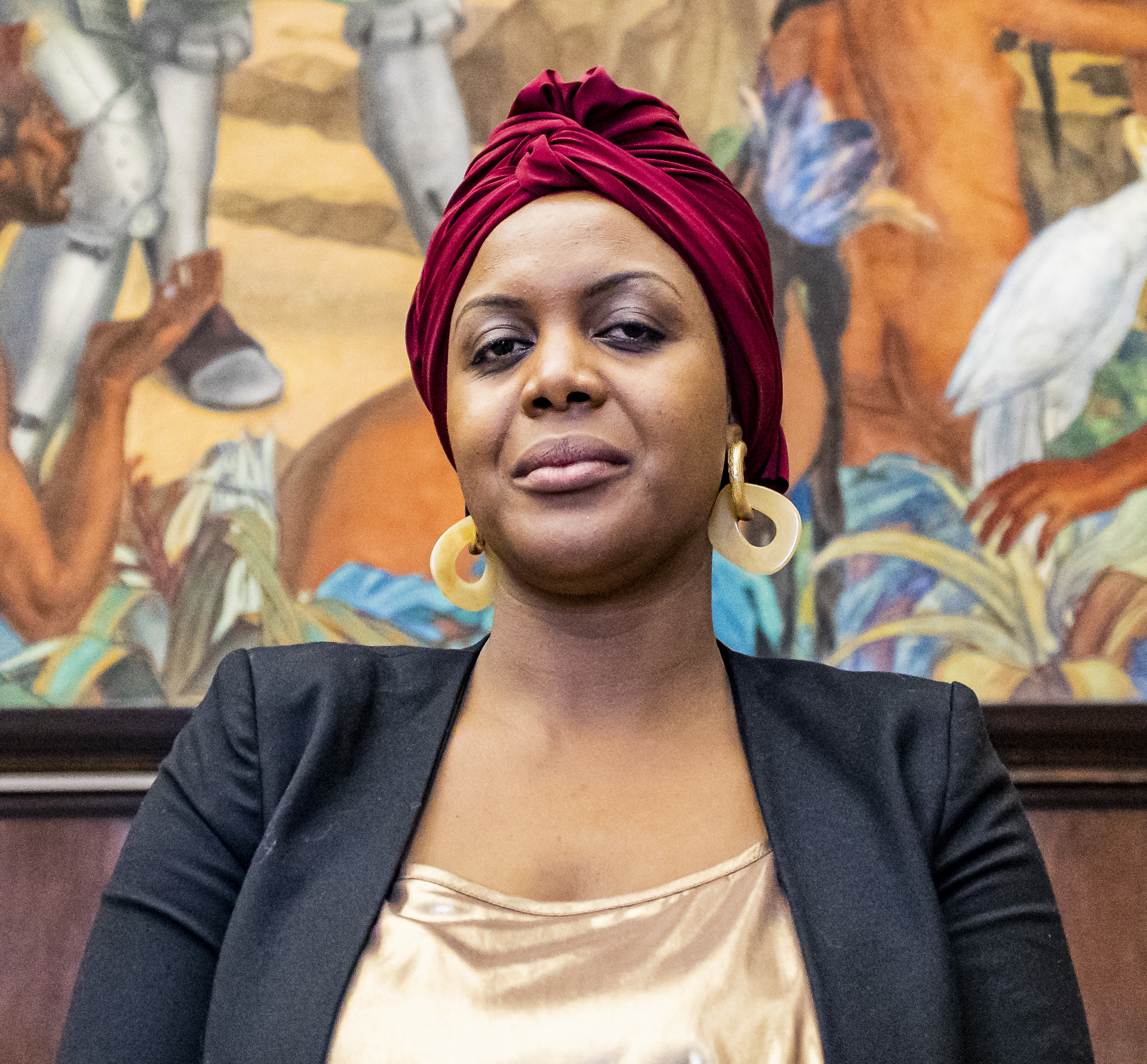
Joacine Katar Moreira, deputy elected in the 2019 legislative election. She ended up being expelled from the party in 2020.

Primaries to select the candidates for the 2019 European Parliament election and for the 2019 legislative election were held on 22 February 2019 and on 3 March 2019. Rui Tavares decided only to run for the European Parliament, winning that contest, with historian Joacine Katar Moreira coming in second place. Meanwhile, Katar Moreira was selected as the main candidate for Lisbon, while Jorge Pinto was selected in Porto.

==== 2021 presidential election ====
LIVRE held an internal referendum to determine which candidate the party would support in the 2021 presidential election. On the ballot, 91% of the members were in favour of supporting a candidate, while 89% of the voters supported former MEP Ana Gomes.

Ballot: 21 September 2020
Candidate	Votes	%
Ana Gomes		88.9
Marisa Matias		9.9
Other candidates		1.2
Turnout		
Source: Results

==== 2021 local elections ====
Candidates for the 2021 local elections were selected on 24 June 2021 and 22 July 2021. In Lisbon, Rui Tavares was selected as the party's candidate for Mayor, while Isabel Mendes Lopes was selected as the main candidate for the Municipal Assembly. LIVRE ended up running in a coalition with the PS led by Fernando Medina, with Rui Tavares being elected to the City Council in result of that. In Porto, Diamantino Raposinho was selected as the party's candidate for Mayor.

==== 2022 legislative election ====
In the 2022 legislative election, primaries were held on 28 November 2021 in order to select the party's candidates. Rui Tavares returned as the main candidate for Lisbon, with Isabel Mendes Lopes in second place despite having less support than Carlos Teixeira, due to the parity rule.

==== 2024 legislative election ====
Primaries were held for the 2024 legislative election on 7 December 2023 and 12 December 2023. In an election marked by an increase in the number of deputies from LIVRE, Rui Tavares was once again selected as the main candidate from Lisbon, with Jorge Pinto running in Porto and Paulo Muacho in Setúbal. Co-spokesperson Teresa Mota ran once again in Braga.

==== 2024 European Parliament election ====
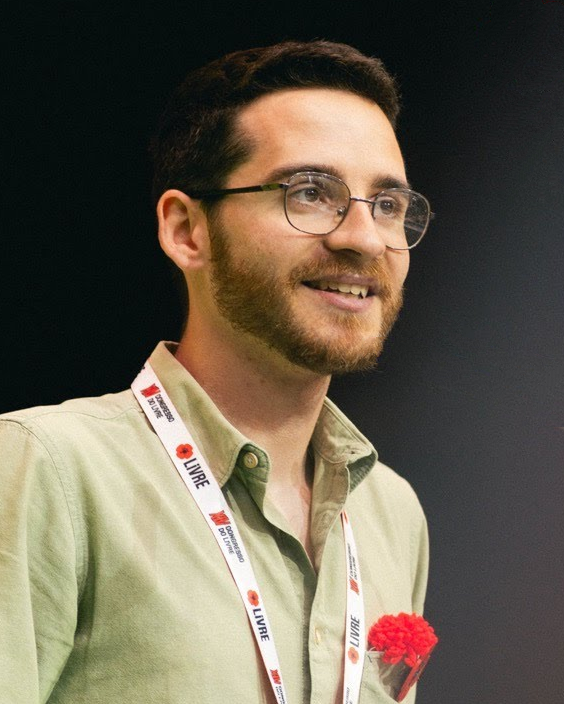
Francisco Paupério, LIVRE's main candidate in the 2024 European Parliament election

Primaries were held for the 2024 European Parliament election with a first round on 10 April 2024 and a second round on 19 April 2024. The winner of the first round was Francisco Paupério, who was ahead of leadership-aligned candidate Filipa Pinto.

Following the first round, accusations arose that Paupério had won because of the votes on non-members, some aligned with other parties. This caused the party to intend to restrict the second round of voting to party members, a decision that was eventually reverted after public backlash.

Despite this controversy, Francisco Paupério ended up being selected as main candidate, with a substantial margin over second candidate Filipa Pinto.

==== 2025 legislative election ====
In the 2025 legislative election, primaries were held with a first round on 19 March 2025 and a second round on 24 and 25 March 2025. This was the first time in which only members and party supporters were allowed to vote on the second round.

Rui Tavares was selected as the main candidate from Lisbon, while Jorge Pinto was the main candidate in Porto and Paulo Muacho was selected in Setúbal. Teresa Mota was selected for Braga, but ended up withrawing and was replaced by Jorge Oliveira Araújo. Francisco Paupério, who had been the main candidate in the 2024 European Parliament election, ran in Lisbon, ranking fifth in the first round and sixth on the second.

There was one rejected candidacy, Paulo Barcelos in Madeira, who only got 40.5% of votes in favour. He ended up being replaced by Marta Sofia, who had been the main candidate in the 2025 regional election.

==== 2025 local elections ====
Primaries for the 2025 local elections were held with a first round on 25 February 2025 and a second round on 7 July 2025, a process interrupted by the snap legislative election held in May. No deputies from the party ran in the primaries. In Lisbon, the selected candidate for Mayor was Carlos Teixeira, with Ofélia Janeiro being the main candidate for the Municipal Assembly, with these candidates being integrated in the lists of the PS/Livre/BE/PAN coalition led by Alexandra Leitão. Meanwhile in Porto, Hélder Sousa was selected as the candidate for Mayor, with Diamantino Raposinho becoming the party's candidate for the Municipal Assembly.

There were five rejected candidacies in this election, all for parish assemblies: Sérgio Valente for Parque das Nações in Lisbon, Carlos Melo for Santa Maria Maior in Lisbon, Duarte Guelha for Póvoa de Santo Adrião e Olival Basto in Odivelas, Gonçalo Lúcio for Rio de Mouro in Sintra, and Fernando Morais for Castanheira do Ribatejo e Cachoeiras in Vila Franca de Xira.

==== 2026 presidential election ====
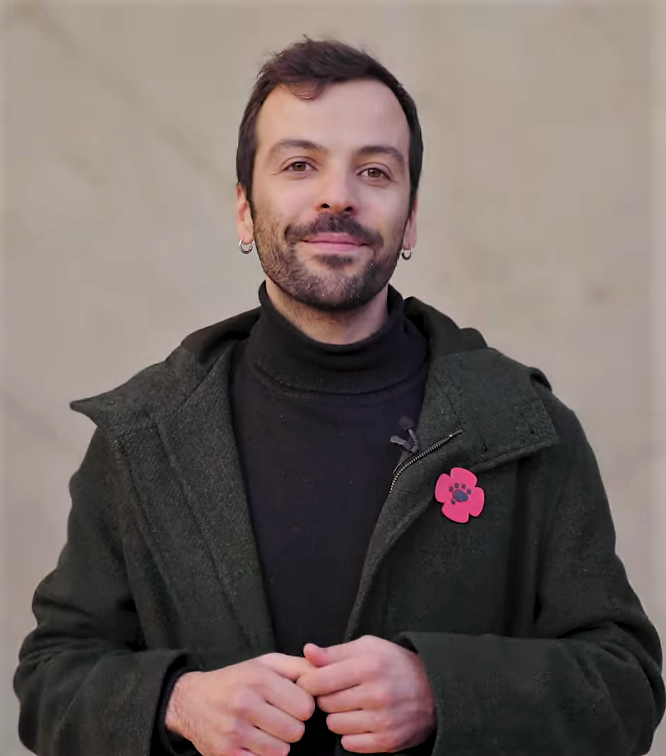
Jorge Pinto, deputy from the party and presidential candidate in 2026

Jorge Pinto, deputy from LIVRE, announced his candidacy for the 2026 presidential election on 22 October 2025. Despite that, some party members had already supported António José Seguro, from the Socialist Party. The party allowed votes on other candidates on the left, despite not including them on the ballot. On the ballot, 78.7% of the party members decided to support a candidate, while the distribution of support between candidates was the following:

Ballot: 31 October 2025
Candidate	Votes	%
Jorge Pinto	819	62.9
António José Seguro	252	19.4
António Filipe	121	9.3
Catarina Martins	70	5.4
Other candidates	40	3.1
Turnout	1,302	
Source: Results

As such, LIVRE officially supported Jorge Pinto. Even though he was an MP for the party, this was the least consensual endorsement of a presidential candidate by LIVRE of all time.

== Political stances ==
One of the main points of the party's manifesto going into the 2022 legislative election was support for a universal basic income. In January 2022, the party highlighted its support for increasing the national minimum wage to €1,000 per month and extending support for remote working, pregnant workers, workers with health problems, caregivers and supporting "micro-businesses". The party also supports a Green New Deal for Portugal, lowering VAT from 23% to 6% on vets and pet food, banning bullfighting and legalising cannabis. The party has been described as left-wing. and green and left-libertarian All of its MPs have voted in support of legalising euthanasia.

== Election results ==
=== Assembly of the Republic ===
Vote share in the Portuguese legislative elections

Election	Main candidate	Votes	%	Seats	+/-	Government	Notes
2015	Rui Tavares	39,330	0.7 (#9)	0 / 230	New	No seats	
2019	Joacine Katar Moreira	56,940	1.1 (#9)	1 / 230	▲1	Opposition (2019–2020)	Joacine Katar Moreira was expelled from the LIVRE caucus in January 2020.
2019	Joacine Katar Moreira	56,940	1.1 (#9)	1 / 230	▲1	No seats (2020–2022)	Joacine Katar Moreira was expelled from the LIVRE caucus in January 2020.
2022	Rui Tavares	71,232	1.3 (#9)	1 / 230	0	Opposition	
2024	Rui Tavares	204,875	3.2 (#7)	4 / 230	▲3	Opposition	
2025	Rui Tavares	257,291	4.1 (#5)	6 / 230	▲2	Opposition	

=== Presidential ===
Election	Candidate	First round		Second round		Result
Election	Candidate	Votes	%	Votes	%	Result
2016	António Sampaio da Nóvoa	1,062,138	22.9 (#2)			Lost ✗
2021	Ana Gomes	540,823	13.0 (#2)			Lost ✗
2026	Jorge Pinto	38,588	0.7 (#9)			Lost ✗

=== European Parliament ===
Election	List leader	Votes	%	Seats	+/–	EP Group
2014	Rui Tavares	71,495	2.2 (#6)	0 / 21		–
2019	Rui Tavares	60,446	1.8 (#8)	0 / 21	0	–
2024	Francisco Paupério	148,572	3.8 (#7)	0 / 21	0	–

=== Local elections ===
The following results include LIVRE led coalitions.

Election	Votes	%	Mayors	+/-	Councillors	+/-	Assemblies	+/-	Parishes	+/-
2017	17,417	0.06	0 / 308	New	0 / 2,074	New	1 / 6,461	New	2 / 27,019	New
2021	24,685	0.05	0 / 308	0	1 / 2,064	▲1	3 / 6,448	▲2	3 / 26,797	▲1
2025	58,440	1.07	0 / 308	0	1 / 2,058	0	26 / 6,463	▲23	41 / 27,973	▲38

=== Regional Assemblies ===
Region	Election	Main candidate	Votes	%	Seats	+/-	Government
Azores	2016	José Manuel Azevedo	227	0.2 (#11)	0 / 57	New	No seats
Azores	2020	José Manuel Azevedo	362	0.4 (#11)	0 / 57	0	No seats
Azores	2024	José Manuel Azevedo	735	0.6 (#8)	0 / 57	0	No seats
Madeira	2023	Tiago Camacho	858	0.6 (#10)	0 / 47	New	No seats
Madeira	2024	Marta Sofia	911	0.7 (#11)	0 / 47	0	No seats
Madeira	2025	Marta Sofia	959	0.7 (#10)	0 / 47	0	No seats
