= João Oliveira (politician) =

Portuguese politician

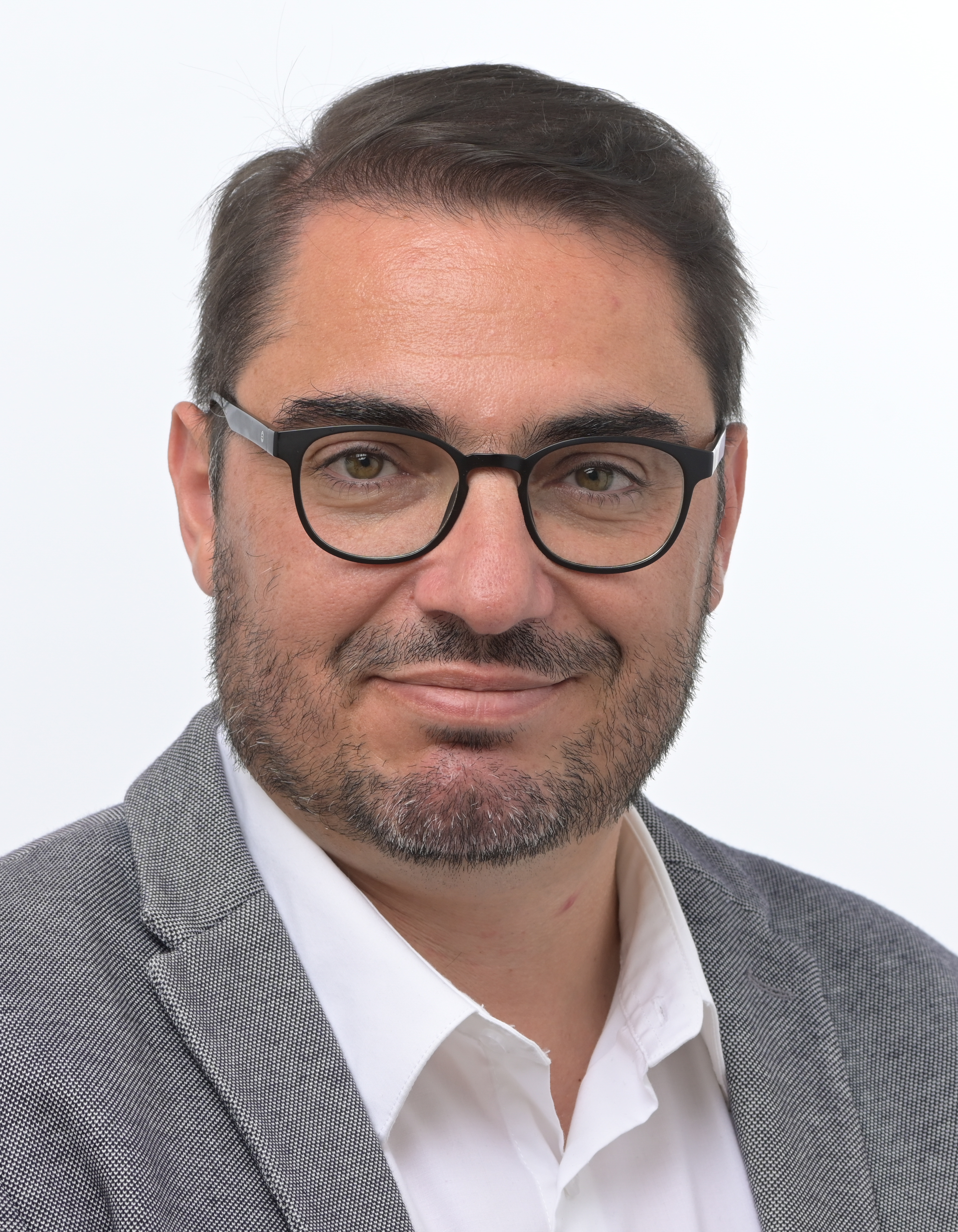
- Official portrait, 2024

Member of the European Parliament for Portugal
- Incumbent
- Assumed office 16 July 2024

Member of the Assembly of the Republic
- In office 29 January 2007 – 28 March 2022
- Constituency: Évora

Personal details
- Born: João Guilherme Ramos Rosa de Oliveira; 9 July 1979 (age 47) Évora, Portugal
- Party: Portuguese Communist Party
- Education: University of Coimbra
- Occupation: Lawyer • Politician

João Guilherme Ramos Rosa de Oliveira (born 9 July 1979) is a Portuguese lawyer and politician. Currently he is a MEP for the Portuguese Communist Party in the far-left political group The Left (GUE/NGL).

== Biography ==
Oliveira was born in Évora, Portugal. He studied law at the Faculty of Law at the University of Coimbra. He has one daughter.

== Career ==
He was a member of the Assembly of the Portuguese Republic for the Portuguese Communist Party, from 2007 to 2022. He was always elected by the constituency of Évora, as a member of the Unitary Democratic Coalition lists for that same constituency. He was not re-elected in the 2022 legislative elections, given that the CDU lost the seat it had in Évora to the Social Democratic Party, for the first time since 1976.

Oliveira was the CDU candidate to the 2024 European elections. He secured election as a Member of the European Parliament for the Tenth European Parliament.

In 2025, he ran for Mayor of Évora, to replace the outgoing Communist mayor Carlos Pinto de Sá. He lost against Socialist candidate Carlos Zorrinho, coming third place with 15.8% of the votes.

=== Political positions ===
During his tenure in the European Parliament, he has frequently voted against resolutions critical of Russia, China, and other governments accused of human rights violations. He has refused to explicitly condemn the Russian invasion of Ukraine and has blamed the conflict on the United States, NATO, and the European Union.

Oliveira opposed multiple resolutions condemning Russia’s war of aggression against Ukraine, including resolutions addressing the human cost of the war, the continued bombing of civilians, the situation of illegally detained civilians and prisoners of war, and the need to maintain EU support for Ukraine. He also voted against rejecting false historical claims used to justify the invasion of Ukraine and condemning Russia’s failure to establish accountability for Soviet crimes.

He voted against resolutions condemning violations of religious freedom in Tibet, and China's continued military provocations around Taiwan. He was one of nine MEPs to vote against condemning the conviction and sentencing of pro-democracy activist Jimmy Lai in Hong Kong, in the context of state security laws being used to eliminate independent media, free speech and political opposition in Hong Kong.

In 2025, Oliveira abstained on the resolution on combating the sexual abuse and sexual exploitation of children and child sexual abuse material. He criticized the resolution for placing an excessive emphasis on increasing criminal penalties.

He was the only MEP in The Left group to vote against a resolution stating that Hungary is violating the values on which the EU is founded, including the rule of law, amid ongoing democratic backsliding.

== Electoral history ==
=== European Parliament election, 2024 ===
Ballot: 9 June 2024
Party	Candidate	Votes	%	Seats	+/−
PS	Marta Temido	1,268,915	32.1	8	–1
AD	Sebastião Bugalho	1,229,895	31.1	7	±0
Chega	António Tânger Corrêa	387,068	9.8	2	+2
IL	João Cotrim de Figueiredo	358,811	9.1	2	+2
BE	Catarina Martins	168,107	4.3	1	–1
CDU	João Oliveira	162,630	4.1	1	–1
Livre	Francisco Paupério	148,572	3.8	0	±0
ADN	Joana Amaral Dias	54,120	1.4	0	±0
PAN	Pedro Fidalgo Marques	48,006	1.2	0	–1
Other parties		48,647	1.2	0	±0
Blank/Invalid ballots		77,208	2.0	–	–
Turnout		3,951,979	36.63	21	±0
Source: Comissão Nacional de Eleições

=== Évora City Council election, 2025 ===
Ballot: 12 October 2025
Party	Candidate	Votes	%	Seats	+/−
PS	Carlos Zorrinho	8,169	29.8	3	+1
PSD/CDS/PPM	Henrique Sim-Sim	8,013	29.3	2	±0
CDU	João Oliveira	4,332	15.8	1	–1
CH	Rúben Miguéis	3,816	13.9	1	+1
MCE	Florbela Fernandes	1,856	6.8	0	–1
BE	Pedro Ferreira	343	1.3	0	±0
IL	Fábio Cabaço	252	0.9	0	new
Blank/Invalid ballots		602	2.2	–	–
Turnout		27,383	59.41	7	±0
Source: Autárquicas 2025
