= Marta Temido =

Portuguese politician (born 1974)

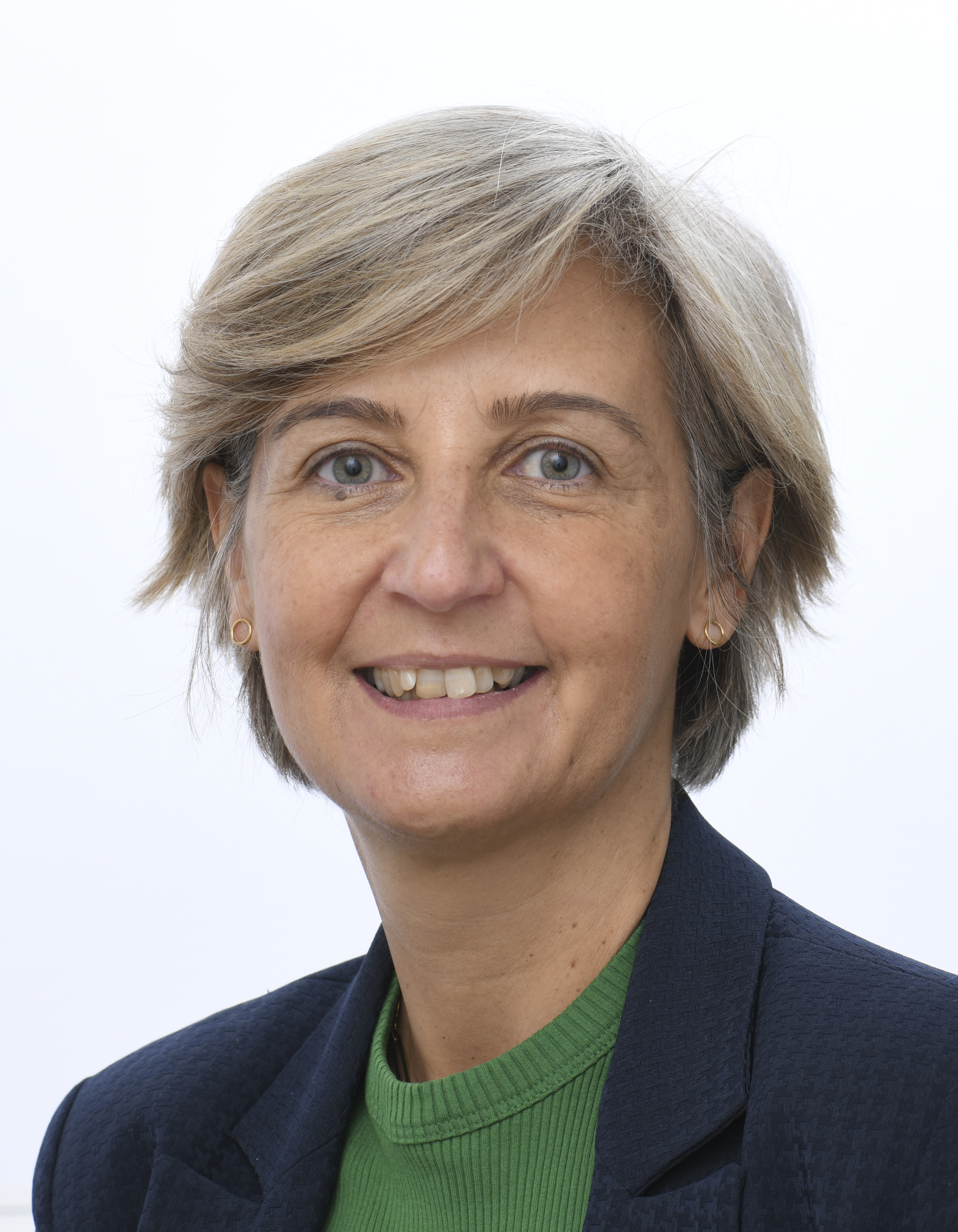
- Official portrait, 2024

Member of the European Parliament for Portugal
- Incumbent
- Assumed office 16 July 2024

Minister of Health
- In office 15 October 2018 – 10 September 2022
- Prime Minister: António Costa
- Preceded by: Adalberto Campos Fernandes
- Succeeded by: Manuel Pizarro

Member of the Assembly of the Republic
- In office 10 September 2022 – 15 July 2024
- Constituency: Coimbra (2022–2024); Lisbon (2024)

President of the Socialist Party of Lisbon
- In office 6 February 2023 – 6 July 2024
- Preceded by: Davide Amado
- Succeeded by: Davide Amado

Personal details
- Born: Marta Alexandra Fartura Braga Temido; 2 March 1974 (age 52) Coimbra, Portugal
- Party: Socialist Party (2021–present)
- Other political affiliations: Independent (until 2021)
- Spouse: Jorge de Almeida Simões (m. 2010)
- Children: 2 stepchildren
- Education: University of Coimbra; NOVA University of Lisbon

Marta Alexandra Fartura Braga Temido de Almeida Simões (born 2 March 1974) is a Portuguese politician who served as Minister of Health under Prime Minister António Costa, between 15 October 2018 and 10 September 2022. She submitted her resignation from the post on 30 August 2022 and ended her functions on 10 September 2022.

Initially she was an independent minister, invited to perform the role without affiliation to the governing parties, but in August 2021 she joined the Socialist Party (PS).

Temido was elected a Member of the European Parliament in the June 2024 European election, and formally took her seat in the Tenth European Parliament on 16 July.

== Early life and education ==
Temido was born in Coimbra. She has a law degree and a master's degree in health economics and management from the University of Coimbra, as well as a PhD in international health from the NOVA University of Lisbon.

== Career ==
Before taking on government duties, Temido was deputy director of the Instituto de Higiene e Medicina Tropical at NOVA University of Lisbon, non-executive chairman of the administration of the Hospital da Cruz Vermelha Portuguesa (Portuguese Red Cross) and a member of the administration of several public hospitals. From 2016 to 2017, Temido served as the president of the board of directors of the Central Administration of the Health System (ACSS).

Temido became well-known in Portugal during the COVID-19 pandemic, appearing almost daily at press conferences. When Portugal held the rotating presidency of the Council of the European Union in 2021, Temido chaired the meetings of its Employment, Social Policy, Health and Consumer Affairs Council, in which she stressed the need for the EU to make joint purchases of vaccines.

After resigning from the position of Minister of Health in September 2022, Temido has been serving as an MP from the district of Coimbra in the Assembly of the Republic. Being speculated as the socialist candidate for the next Lisbon Mayoral Election as well as a possible contender for the next Socialist Leadership Election, Temido was elected in July 2023 as the Chair of the Lisbon Socialist Party and was appointed, alongside the minister Ana Catarina Mendes, as one of the possible candidates of the Socialist List for the 2024 European Parliament election.

== Electoral history ==
=== European Parliament election, 2024 ===
Ballot: 9 June 2024
Party	Candidate	Votes	%	Seats	+/−
PS	Marta Temido	1,268,915	32.1	8	–1
AD	Sebastião Bugalho	1,229,895	31.1	7	±0
Chega	António Tânger Corrêa	387,068	9.8	2	+2
IL	João Cotrim de Figueiredo	358,811	9.1	2	+2
BE	Catarina Martins	168,107	4.3	1	–1
CDU	João Oliveira	162,630	4.1	1	–1
Livre	Francisco Paupério	148,572	3.8	0	±0
ADN	Joana Amaral Dias	54,120	1.4	0	±0
PAN	Pedro Fidalgo Marques	48,006	1.2	0	–1
Other parties		48,647	1.2	0	±0
Blank/Invalid ballots		77,208	2.0	–	–
Turnout		3,951,979	36.63	21	±0
Source: Comissão Nacional de Eleições
