= António Tânger Corrêa =

Portuguese Olympic sailor, politician and diplomat

António Tânger Corrêa MEP
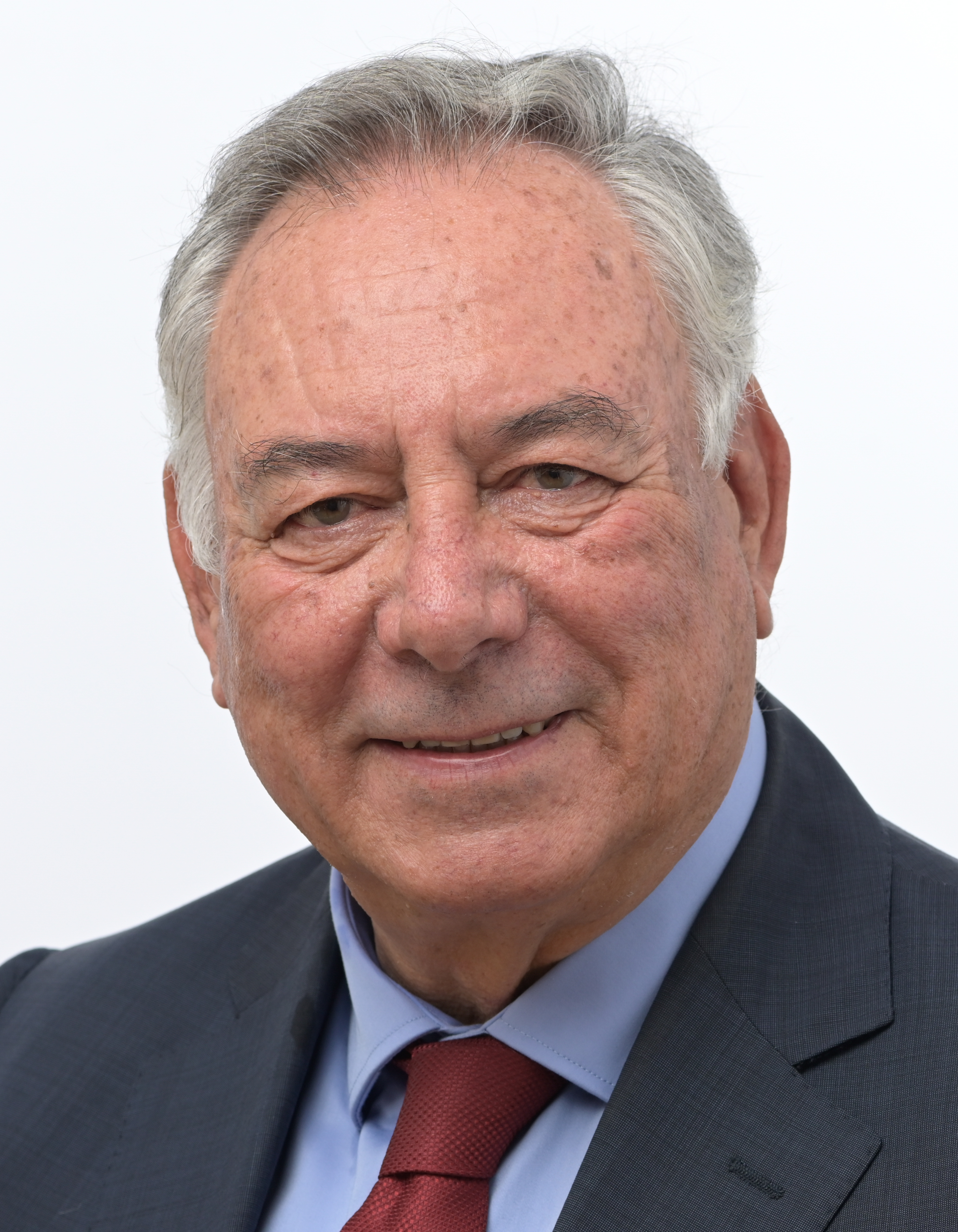
- Official portrait, 2024

Member of the European Parliament
- Incumbent
- Assumed office 16 July 2024
- Constituency: Portugal

Vice President of Chega
- Incumbent
- Assumed office 20 September 2020
- President: André Ventura
Other offices
Ambassador of Portugal to Qatar
In office 18 October 2015 – 24 August 2018
Preceded by	Fernando Araújo
Succeeded by	Ricardo Pracana
Ambassador of Portugal to Egypt
In office 12 May 2012 – 2 July 2015
Preceded by	Duarte Rocha
Succeeded by	Maria Madalena Fischer
Ambassador of Portugal to Lithuania
In office 29 November 2005 – 1 December 2008
Portugal General Consul in Rio de Janeiro
In office April 2003 – November 2005
Ambassador of Portugal to Israel
In office 2 September 2001 – 7 April 2003
Preceded by	José Filipe Moraes Cabral
Succeeded by	Pedro de Abreu Bártolo
Ambassador of Portugal to Serbia and Montenegro
In office 17 March 1999 – 19 June 2001
Preceded by	Rogério Silvestre Lopes
Succeeded by	António Russo Dias
Head of the Portugal Temporary Mission in Bosnia and Herzegovina
In office March 1996 – October 1998
Portugal General Consul in Goa
In office October 1993 – March 1996
Portugal General Consul in Toronto
In office November 1984 – July 1986

Personal details
- Born: António Manuel Moreira Tânger Corrêa; 24 April 1952 (age 74) Lisbon, Portugal
- Party: Chega (2019–present)
- Other political affiliations: CDS – People's Party (formerly)
- Height: 1.65 m (5.4 ft)
- Education: University of Lisbon
- Occupation: Politician • Diplomat

António Manuel Moreira Tânger Corrêa (born 24 April 1952) is a politician, former diplomat and sailor from Portugal. He is the first Vice President of the Portuguese political party Chega, led by André Ventura.

Tânger Corrêa was elected a Member of the European Parliament in the 2024 European election, and he took office in the Tenth European Parliament on 16 July 2024.

== Political career ==
In 1974, after the revolution of 25 April, he was Secretary General of the Centrist Youth (CDS-PP) and in 1980, he was for a year Deputy to the Minister of Foreign Affairs, Diogo Freitas do Amaral, in the government of the Democratic Alliance (AD) by Francisco Sá Carneiro.

António Tânger Corrêa is the current Vice President of the Portuguese political party Chega, by appointment of the party leader André Ventura.

Tânger Corrêa was the Chega main candidate to the 2024 European elections, being elected as a Member of the European Parliament.

== Diplomatic career ==
He was a diplomat for over four decades (1981–2018), he was consul general of Portugal in Goa and Rio de Janeiro, ambassador of Portugal to Bosnia, Serbia, Israel, Egypt, Qatar, Lithuania, and second secretary of the Portuguese embassy in Beijing.

As Portuguese diplomat he was involved in at least two scandals that cost taxpayers thousands of euros. António Tânger Corrêa was suspended in 2009 for 90 days due to various irregularities found in the management of the Portuguese embassy in the Lithuanian capital, Vilnius.

== Sailing career ==
Tânger Corrêa was also a sailor. He represented Portugal at the 1992 Summer Olympics in Barcelona, Spain as helmsman in the Soling. With crew members Ricardo Batista and Luis Miguel Santos where the team reached 21st place.

== Electoral history ==
=== European Parliament election, 2024 ===
Ballot: 9 June 2024
Party	Candidate	Votes	%	Seats	+/−
PS	Marta Temido	1,268,915	32.1	8	–1
AD	Sebastião Bugalho	1,229,895	31.1	7	±0
Chega	António Tânger Corrêa	387,068	9.8	2	+2
IL	João Cotrim de Figueiredo	358,811	9.1	2	+2
BE	Catarina Martins	168,107	4.3	1	–1
CDU	João Oliveira	162,630	4.1	1	–1
Livre	Francisco Paupério	148,572	3.8	0	±0
ADN	Joana Amaral Dias	54,120	1.4	0	±0
PAN	Pedro Fidalgo Marques	48,006	1.2	0	–1
Other parties		48,647	1.2	0	±0
Blank/Invalid ballots		77,208	2.0	–	–
Turnout		3,951,979	36.63	21	±0
Source: Comissão Nacional de Eleições

== Books ==
- Do Transiberiano ao Médio Oriente - Navegações num mundo em mudança, 2024
