= Sebastião Bugalho =

Portuguese journalist and politician (born 1995)

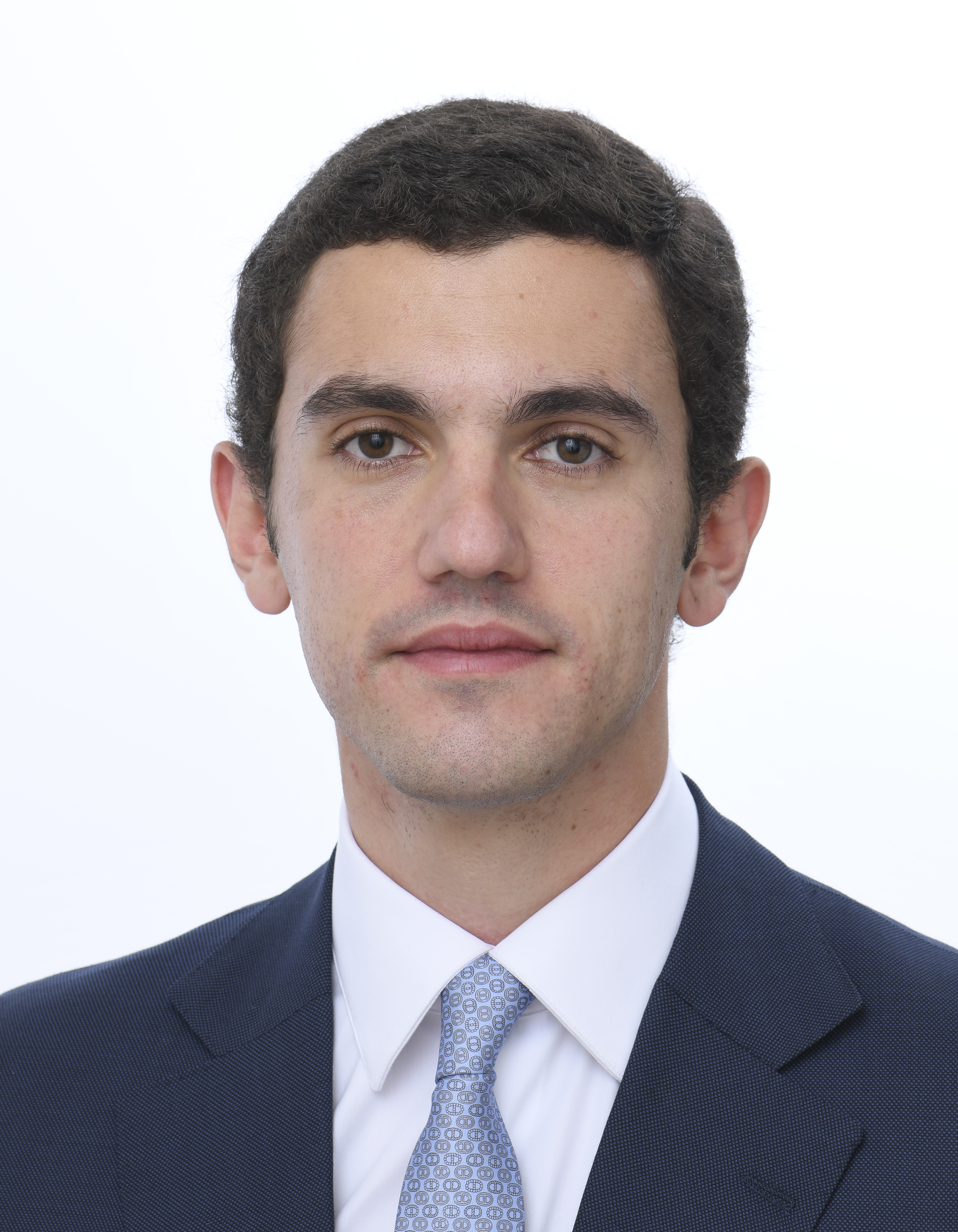
- Official portrait, 2024

Member of the European Parliament for Portugal
- Incumbent
- Assumed office 16 July 2024

Personal details
- Born: Sebastião Maria Reis Bugalho; 15 November 1995 (age 31) Lisbon, Portugal
- Party: PSD (2024–present)
- Other political affiliations: CDS–PP (2019–2021); Independent (2021–2024)
- Parent(s): Patrícia Reis (mother); João Fernandes Bugalho (father)
- Education: Institute for Political Studies – Catholic University of Portugal
- Occupation: Journalist • politician

Sebastião Maria Reis Bugalho (European Portuguese pronunciation: [sɨβɐʃˈtjɐ̃w̃ βuˈɣaʎu]; born 15 November 1995) is a Portuguese politician, journalist and political commentator. Bugalho serves as a Member of the European Parliament since 2024, after being elected as a member of the Democratic Alliance in the 2024 European Parliament election.

== Early life ==
He is the eldest son of journalists João Fernandes Bugalho and Patrícia Reis.

He was a student of Political science at the Institute of Political Studies of the Catholic University and he currently studies at ISCTE – Instituto Universitário de Lisboa.

He was born in Lisbon.

== Journalistic activity ==
He began his journalistic career at the Jornal i, when only 19 years old, after he proposed to write an opinion article there. He was subsequently invited to write a weekly opinion column and to work on the news coverage of the CDS – People's Party.

In his first years of college he combined classes with internships at Jornal i and Sol. He wrote mainly about politics, having interviewed Pedro Nuno Santos, Graça Fonseca, Rui Moreira, Francisco Rodrigues dos Santos and André Ventura. Shortly before abandoning his journalistic career, he published an article about the future list of CDS-PP candidates for the 2019 legislative elections, a list that he would later join.

He was then invited to offer political commentary on TVI, with José Miguel Júdice and Constança Cunha e Sá. He then had a program, with António Rolo Duarte, Novos Fora Nada, on TVI24.

He was a columnist at Diário de Notícias, at Observador and a commentator at CNN Portugal. He is currently a columnist for the weekly Expresso. Between October 2023 and April 2024, he was a commentator on SIC Notícias, which underwent a rebranding that same month.

== Political career ==
He was chosen by Assunção Cristas to join, in sixth place, the CDS-PP list, in the 2019 Legislative Elections, by the Lisbon constituency, as an independent. At that time he was not elected but later, in September 2021, he was able to replace the MP Ana Rita Bessa, in the Assembly of the Republic of Portugal, but at that time he refused to do so.

In 2024, Bugalho was chosen as the main candidate from the Democratic Alliance to the 2024 European Parliament election, after a lot of speculation that the main candidate would be the Mayor of Porto Rui Moreira.

Bugalho considers himself to be right-wing, Catholic and conservative, but also Europeanist and Atlanticist.

== Electoral history ==
=== European Parliament election, 2024 ===
Ballot: 9 June 2024
Party	Candidate	Votes	%	Seats	+/−
PS	Marta Temido	1,268,915	32.1	8	–1
AD	Sebastião Bugalho	1,229,895	31.1	7	±0
Chega	António Tânger Corrêa	387,068	9.8	2	+2
IL	João Cotrim de Figueiredo	358,811	9.1	2	+2
BE	Catarina Martins	168,107	4.3	1	–1
CDU	João Oliveira	162,630	4.1	1	–1
Livre	Francisco Paupério	148,572	3.8	0	±0
ADN	Joana Amaral Dias	54,120	1.4	0	±0
PAN	Pedro Fidalgo Marques	48,006	1.2	0	–1
Other parties		48,647	1.2	0	±0
Blank/Invalid ballots		77,208	2.0	–	–
Turnout		3,951,979	36.63	21	±0
Source: Comissão Nacional de Eleições
