= Évora (Assembly of the Republic constituency) =

Constituency of the Assembly of the Republic, the national legislature of Portugal

- Constituency for the Assembly of the Republic
- Location of Évora within Portugal
- District: Évora
- Population: 153,430 (2024)
- Electorate: 132,625 (2025)
- Area: 7,393 km^{2} (2024)

Current Constituency
- Created: 1976
- Seats: List: 3 (2002–present); 4 (1987–2002); 5 (1979–1987); 6 (1976–1979)
- Deputies: List: Luís Dias (PS); Francisco Figueira (PSD); Jorge Valsassina Galveias (CH)

Évora is one of the 22 multi-member constituencies of the Assembly of the Republic, the national legislature of Portugal. The constituency was established in 1976 when the Assembly of the Republic was established by the constitution following the restoration of democracy. It is conterminous with the district of Évora. The constituency currently elects three of the 230 members of the Assembly of the Republic using the closed party-list proportional representation electoral system. At the 2025 legislative election it had 132,625 registered electors.

== Electoral system ==
Évora currently elects three of the 230 members of the Assembly of the Republic using the closed party-list proportional representation electoral system. Seats are allocated using the D'Hondt method.

== Election results ==
=== Summary ===
| Election | Unitary Democrats CDU / APU / PCP | | | Left Bloc BE / UDP | | | LIVRE L | | | Socialists PS / FRS | | | People Animals Nature PAN | | | Democratic Renewal PRD | | | Social Democrats PSD / PàF / AD / PPD | | | Liberals IL | | | CDS – People's CDS–PP / CDS | | | Chega CH / PPV/CDC / PPV | | |
| Election | Votes | % | Seats | Votes | % | Seats | Votes | % | Seats | Votes | % | Seats | Votes | % | Seats | Votes | % | Seats | Votes | % | Seats | Votes | % | Seats | Votes | % | Seats | Votes | % | Seats |
|---|---|---|---|---|---|---|---|---|---|---|---|---|---|---|---|---|---|---|---|---|---|---|---|---|---|---|---|---|---|---|
| 2025 | 8,636 | 10.42% | 0 | 1,487 | 1.79% | 0 | 2,296 | 2.77% | 0 | 23,617 | 28.48% | 1 | 790 | 0.95% | 0 | | | | 21,071 | 25.41% | 1 | 2,415 | 2.91% | 0 | | | | 21,082 | 25.43% | 1 |
| 2024 | 9,771 | 11.19% | 0 | 3,816 | 4.37% | 0 | 1,774 | 2.03% | 0 | 29,310 | 33.56% | 1 | 1,001 | 1.15% | 0 | | | | 20,051 | 22.96% | 1 | 2,228 | 2.55% | 0 | | | | 17,850 | 20.44% | 1 |
| 2022 | 11,494 | 14.82% | 0 | 2,629 | 3.39% | 0 | 496 | 0.64% | 0 | 34,700 | 44.74% | 2 | 665 | 0.86% | 0 | | | | 16,905 | 21.80% | 1 | 1,947 | 2.51% | 0 | 896 | 1.16% | 0 | 7,221 | 9.31% | 0 |
| 2019 | 13,980 | 19.61% | 1 | 6,624 | 9.29% | 0 | 500 | 0.70% | 0 | 28,372 | 39.80% | 2 | 1,446 | 2.03% | 0 | | | | 12,936 | 18.14% | 0 | 490 | 0.69% | 0 | 2,534 | 3.55% | 0 | 1,646 | 2.31% | 0 |
| 2015 | 18,584 | 22.59% | 1 | 7,319 | 8.90% | 0 | 357 | 0.43% | 0 | 31,894 | 38.77% | 1 | 727 | 0.88% | 0 | | | | 20,180 | 24.53% | 1 | | | | | | | | | |
| 2011 | 18,967 | 22.78% | 1 | 4,225 | 5.07% | 0 | | | | 25,010 | 30.04% | 1 | 649 | 0.78% | 0 | | | | 23,747 | 28.52% | 1 | | | | 7,513 | 9.02% | 0 | 153 | 0.18% | 0 |
| 2009 | 20,411 | 22.93% | 1 | 10,168 | 11.42% | 0 | | | | 32,024 | 35.98% | 1 | | | | | | | 17,362 | 19.51% | 1 | | | | 5,837 | 6.56% | 0 | | | |
| 2005 | 20,246 | 21.39% | 1 | 4,463 | 4.72% | 0 | | | | 48,082 | 50.80% | 2 | | | | | | | 16,141 | 17.05% | 0 | | | | 3,594 | 3.80% | 0 | | | |
| 2002 | 19,824 | 22.15% | 1 | 1,611 | 1.80% | 0 | | | | 38,907 | 43.47% | 1 | | | | | | | 23,032 | 25.73% | 1 | | | | 4,171 | 4.66% | 0 | | | |
| 1999 | 22,839 | 25.09% | 1 | 1,392 | 1.53% | 0 | | | | 42,325 | 46.50% | 2 | | | | | | | 17,307 | 19.01% | 1 | | | | 4,683 | 5.14% | 0 | | | |
| 1995 | 28,106 | 27.35% | 1 | 789 | 0.77% | 0 | | | | 44,488 | 43.29% | 2 | | | | | | | 21,091 | 20.52% | 1 | | | | 5,453 | 5.31% | 0 | | | |
| 1991 | 28,315 | 27.64% | 1 | | | | | | | 27,121 | 26.47% | 1 | | | | 825 | 0.81% | 0 | 36,603 | 35.73% | 2 | | | | 2,953 | 2.88% | 0 | | | |
| 1987 | 39,758 | 37.00% | 2 | 671 | 0.62% | 0 | | | | 16,907 | 15.73% | 0 | | | | 8,485 | 7.90% | 0 | 35,300 | 32.85% | 2 | | | | 2,316 | 2.16% | 0 | | | |
| 1985 | 48,680 | 42.30% | 2 | 1,292 | 1.12% | 0 | | | | 16,895 | 14.68% | 1 | | | | 18,707 | 16.25% | 1 | 22,561 | 19.60% | 1 | | | | 3,890 | 3.38% | 0 | | | |
| 1983 | 56,722 | 48.65% | 3 | 902 | 0.77% | 0 | | | | 28,486 | 24.43% | 1 | | | | | | | 22,184 | 19.03% | 1 | | | | 5,395 | 4.63% | 0 | | | |
| 1980 | 57,521 | 46.58% | 3 | 1,161 | 0.94% | 0 | | | | 23,484 | 19.02% | 1 | | | | | | | 36,767 | 29.77% | 1 | | | | | | | | | |
| 1979 | 61,480 | 50.07% | 3 | 2,071 | 1.69% | 0 | | | | 21,229 | 17.29% | 1 | | | | | | | 33,857 | 27.57% | 1 | | | | | | | | | |
| 1976 | 52,291 | 44.63% | 4 | 3,151 | 2.69% | 0 | | | | 36,679 | 31.30% | 2 | | | | | | | 11,107 | 9.48% | 0 | | | | 9,645 | 8.23% | 0 | | | |

(Figures in italics represent alliances.)

=== Detailed ===
==== 2020s ====
===== 2025 =====
Results of the 2025 legislative election held on 18 May 2025:

| Party | | Votes | % | Seats |
|---|---|---|---|---|
| Socialist Party | PS | 23,617 | 28.48% | 1 |
| Chega | CH | 21,082 | 25.43% | 1 |
| Democratic Alliance | AD | 21,071 | 25.41% | 1 |
| Unitary Democratic Coalition | CDU | 8,636 | 10.42% | 0 |
| Liberal Initiative | IL | 2,415 | 2.91% | 0 |
| LIVRE | L | 2,296 | 2.77% | 0 |
| Left Bloc | BE | 1,487 | 1.79% | 0 |
| National Democratic Alternative | ADN | 983 | 1.19% | 0 |
| People Animals Nature | PAN | 790 | 0.95% | 0 |
| Volt Portugal | Volt | 142 | 0.17% | 0 |
| React, Include, Recycle | RIR | 138 | 0.17% | 0 |
| We, the Citizens! | NC | 106 | 0.13% | 0 |
| Ergue-te | E | 83 | 0.10% | 0 |
| People's Monarchist Party | PPM | 68 | 0.08% | 0 |
| Valid votes | | 82,914 | 100.00% | 3 |
| Blank votes | | 1,263 | 1.49% | |
| Rejected votes – other | | 747 | 0.88% | |
| Total polled | | 84,924 | 64.03% | |
| Registered electors | | 132,625 | | |

The following candidates were elected:: Luís Dias (PS); Francisco Figueira (AD); and Jorge Valsassina Galveias (CH).

===== 2024 =====
Results of the 2024 legislative election held on 10 March 2024:

| Party | | Votes | % | Seats |
|---|---|---|---|---|
| Socialist Party | PS | 29,310 | 33.56% | 1 |
| Democratic Alliance | AD | 20,051 | 22.96% | 1 |
| Chega | CH | 17,850 | 20.44% | 1 |
| Unitary Democratic Coalition | CDU | 9,771 | 11.19% | 0 |
| Left Bloc | BE | 3,816 | 4.37% | 0 |
| Liberal Initiative | IL | 2,228 | 2.55% | 0 |
| LIVRE | L | 1,774 | 2.03% | 0 |
| People Animals Nature | PAN | 1,001 | 1.15% | 0 |
| National Democratic Alternative | ADN | 838 | 0.96% | 0 |
| React, Include, Recycle | RIR | 273 | 0.31% | 0 |
| New Right | ND | 160 | 0.18% | 0 |
| Volt Portugal | Volt | 150 | 0.17% | 0 |
| Ergue-te | E | 81 | 0.09% | 0 |
| Alternative 21 (Earth Party and Alliance) | PT-A | 41 | 0.05% | 0 |
| Valid votes | | 87,344 | 100.00% | 3 |
| Blank votes | | 1,252 | 1.40% | |
| Rejected votes – other | | 791 | 0.88% | |
| Total polled | | 89,387 | 67.01% | |
| Registered electors | | 133,400 | | |

The following candidates were elected: Rui Cristina (CH); Luís Dias (PS); and Sónia Ramos (AD).

===== 2022 =====
Results of the 2022 legislative election held on 30 January 2022:

| Party | | Votes | % | Seats |
|---|---|---|---|---|
| Socialist Party | PS | 34,700 | 44.74% | 2 |
| Social Democratic Party | PSD | 16,905 | 21.80% | 1 |
| Unitary Democratic Coalition | CDU | 11,494 | 14.82% | 0 |
| Chega | CH | 7,221 | 9.31% | 0 |
| Left Bloc | BE | 2,629 | 3.39% | 0 |
| Liberal Initiative | IL | 1,947 | 2.51% | 0 |
| CDS – People's Party | CDS–PP | 896 | 1.16% | 0 |
| People Animals Nature | PAN | 665 | 0.86% | 0 |
| LIVRE | L | 496 | 0.64% | 0 |
| React, Include, Recycle | RIR | 263 | 0.34% | 0 |
| Volt Portugal | Volt | 95 | 0.12% | 0 |
| Socialist Alternative Movement | MAS | 76 | 0.10% | 0 |
| Ergue-te | E | 71 | 0.09% | 0 |
| Earth Party | PT | 63 | 0.08% | 0 |
| Portuguese Labour Party | PTP | 42 | 0.05% | 0 |
| Valid votes | | 77,563 | 100.00% | 3 |
| Blank votes | | 842 | 1.07% | |
| Rejected votes – other | | 552 | 0.70% | |
| Total polled | | 78,957 | 58.56% | |
| Registered electors | | 134,828 | | |

The following candidates were elected: Norberto Patinho (PS); Sónia Ramos (PSD); and Luís Capoulas Santos (PS).

==== 2010s ====
===== 2019 =====
Results of the 2019 legislative election held on 6 October 2019:

| Party | | Votes | % | Seats |
|---|---|---|---|---|
| Socialist Party | PS | 28,372 | 39.80% | 2 |
| Unitary Democratic Coalition | CDU | 13,980 | 19.61% | 1 |
| Social Democratic Party | PSD | 12,936 | 18.14% | 0 |
| Left Bloc | BE | 6,624 | 9.29% | 0 |
| CDS – People's Party | CDS–PP | 2,534 | 3.55% | 0 |
| Chega | CH | 1,646 | 2.31% | 0 |
| People Animals Nature | PAN | 1,446 | 2.03% | 0 |
| Portuguese Workers' Communist Party | PCTP | 922 | 1.29% | 0 |
| LIVRE | L | 500 | 0.70% | 0 |
| Liberal Initiative | IL | 490 | 0.69% | 0 |
| Alliance | A | 464 | 0.65% | 0 |
| React, Include, Recycle | RIR | 334 | 0.47% | 0 |
| We, the Citizens! | NC | 312 | 0.44% | 0 |
| National Renewal Party | PNR | 179 | 0.25% | 0 |
| United Party of Retirees and Pensioners | PURP | 149 | 0.21% | 0 |
| Earth Party | PT | 143 | 0.20% | 0 |
| People's Monarchist Party | PPM | 112 | 0.16% | 0 |
| Portuguese Labour Party | PTP | 82 | 0.12% | 0 |
| Democratic Republican Party | PDR | 70 | 0.10% | 0 |
| Valid votes | | 71,295 | 100.00% | 3 |
| Blank votes | | 1,691 | 2.28% | |
| Rejected votes – other | | 1,032 | 1.39% | |
| Total polled | | 74,018 | 54.15% | |
| Registered electors | | 136,694 | | |

The following candidates were elected: João Oliveira (CDU); Norberto Patinho (PS); and Luís Capoulas Santos (PS).

===== 2015 =====
Results of the 2015 legislative election held on 4 October 2015:

| Party | | Votes | % | Seats |
|---|---|---|---|---|
| Socialist Party | PS | 31,894 | 38.77% | 1 |
| Portugal Ahead | PàF | 20,180 | 24.53% | 1 |
| Unitary Democratic Coalition | CDU | 18,584 | 22.59% | 1 |
| Left Bloc | BE | 7,319 | 8.90% | 0 |
| Portuguese Workers' Communist Party | PCTP | 1,257 | 1.53% | 0 |
| People Animals Nature | PAN | 727 | 0.88% | 0 |
| Democratic Republican Party | PDR | 447 | 0.54% | 0 |
| People's Monarchist Party | PPM | 369 | 0.45% | 0 |
| LIVRE | L | 357 | 0.43% | 0 |
| National Renewal Party | PNR | 280 | 0.34% | 0 |
| The Earth Party Movement | MPT | 243 | 0.30% | 0 |
| ACT! (Portuguese Labour Party and Socialist Alternative Movement) | AGIR | 231 | 0.28% | 0 |
| We, the Citizens! | NC | 219 | 0.27% | 0 |
| United Party of Retirees and Pensioners | PURP | 155 | 0.19% | 0 |
| Valid votes | | 82,262 | 100.00% | 3 |
| Blank votes | | 1,430 | 1.69% | |
| Rejected votes – other | | 1,070 | 1.26% | |
| Total polled | | 84,762 | 59.94% | |
| Registered electors | | 141,422 | | |

The following candidates were elected: João Oliveira (CDU); Luís Capoulas Santos (PS); and António Costa Silva (PàF).

===== 2011 =====
Results of the 2011 legislative election held on 5 June 2011:

| Party | | Votes | % | Seats |
|---|---|---|---|---|
| Socialist Party | PS | 25,010 | 30.04% | 1 |
| Social Democratic Party | PSD | 23,747 | 28.52% | 1 |
| Unitary Democratic Coalition | CDU | 18,967 | 22.78% | 1 |
| CDS – People's Party | CDS–PP | 7,513 | 9.02% | 0 |
| Left Bloc | BE | 4,225 | 5.07% | 0 |
| Portuguese Workers' Communist Party | PCTP | 1,810 | 2.17% | 0 |
| Party for Animals and Nature | PAN | 649 | 0.78% | 0 |
| Hope for Portugal Movement | MEP | 259 | 0.31% | 0 |
| The Earth Party Movement | MPT | 237 | 0.28% | 0 |
| Portuguese Labour Party | PTP | 216 | 0.26% | 0 |
| People's Monarchist Party | PPM | 207 | 0.25% | 0 |
| National Renewal Party | PNR | 168 | 0.20% | 0 |
| Pro-Life Party | PPV | 153 | 0.18% | 0 |
| Humanist Party | PH | 91 | 0.11% | 0 |
| Valid votes | | 83,252 | 100.00% | 3 |
| Blank votes | | 1,866 | 2.17% | |
| Rejected votes – other | | 1,011 | 1.17% | |
| Total polled | | 86,129 | 59.02% | |
| Registered electors | | 145,931 | | |

The following candidates were elected: Pedro Lynce (PSD); João Oliveira (CDU); and Carlos Zorrinho (PS).

==== 2000s ====
===== 2009 =====
Results of the 2009 legislative election held on 27 September 2009:

| Party | | Votes | % | Seats |
|---|---|---|---|---|
| Socialist Party | PS | 32,024 | 35.98% | 1 |
| Unitary Democratic Coalition | CDU | 20,411 | 22.93% | 1 |
| Social Democratic Party | PSD | 17,362 | 19.51% | 1 |
| Left Bloc | BE | 10,168 | 11.42% | 0 |
| CDS – People's Party | CDS–PP | 5,837 | 6.56% | 0 |
| Portuguese Workers' Communist Party | PCTP | 1,908 | 2.14% | 0 |
| Hope for Portugal Movement | MEP | 366 | 0.41% | 0 |
| People's Monarchist Party | PPM | 294 | 0.33% | 0 |
| Merit and Society Movement | MMS | 182 | 0.20% | 0 |
| The Earth Party Movement and Humanist Party | MPT-PH | 156 | 0.18% | 0 |
| National Renewal Party | PNR | 152 | 0.17% | 0 |
| New Democracy Party | ND | 150 | 0.17% | 0 |
| Valid votes | | 89,010 | 100.00% | 3 |
| Blank votes | | 1,424 | 1.56% | |
| Rejected votes – other | | 978 | 1.07% | |
| Total polled | | 91,412 | 61.92% | |
| Registered electors | | 147,639 | | |

The following candidates were elected: Luís Capoulas (PSD); João Oliveira (CDU); and Carlos Zorrinho (PS).

===== 2005 =====
Results of the 2005 legislative election held on 20 February 2005:

| Party | | Votes | % | Seats |
|---|---|---|---|---|
| Socialist Party | PS | 48,082 | 50.80% | 2 |
| Unitary Democratic Coalition | CDU | 20,246 | 21.39% | 1 |
| Social Democratic Party | PSD | 16,141 | 17.05% | 0 |
| Left Bloc | BE | 4,463 | 4.72% | 0 |
| CDS – People's Party | CDS–PP | 3,594 | 3.80% | 0 |
| Portuguese Workers' Communist Party | PCTP | 1,309 | 1.38% | 0 |
| New Democracy Party | ND | 398 | 0.42% | 0 |
| Humanist Party | PH | 191 | 0.20% | 0 |
| National Renewal Party | PNR | 124 | 0.13% | 0 |
| Workers' Party of Socialist Unity | POUS | 104 | 0.11% | 0 |
| Valid votes | | 94,652 | 100.00% | 3 |
| Blank votes | | 1,327 | 1.37% | |
| Rejected votes – other | | 756 | 0.78% | |
| Total polled | | 96,735 | 65.95% | |
| Registered electors | | 146,682 | | |

The following candidates were elected: Abílio Dias Fernandes (CDU); Henrique António Troncho (PS); and Carlos Zorrinho (PS).

===== 2002 =====
Results of the 2002 legislative election held on 17 March 2002:

| Party | | Votes | % | Seats |
|---|---|---|---|---|
| Socialist Party | PS | 38,907 | 43.47% | 1 |
| Social Democratic Party | PSD | 23,032 | 25.73% | 1 |
| Unitary Democratic Coalition | CDU | 19,824 | 22.15% | 1 |
| CDS – People's Party | CDS–PP | 4,171 | 4.66% | 0 |
| Left Bloc | BE | 1,611 | 1.80% | 0 |
| Portuguese Workers' Communist Party | PCTP | 1,200 | 1.34% | 0 |
| The Earth Party Movement | MPT | 257 | 0.29% | 0 |
| People's Monarchist Party | PPM | 188 | 0.21% | 0 |
| Humanist Party | PH | 147 | 0.16% | 0 |
| Workers' Party of Socialist Unity | POUS | 84 | 0.09% | 0 |
| National Renewal Party | PNR | 82 | 0.09% | 0 |
| Valid votes | | 89,503 | 100.00% | 3 |
| Blank votes | | 815 | 0.90% | |
| Rejected votes – other | | 702 | 0.77% | |
| Total polled | | 91,020 | 61.89% | |
| Registered electors | | 147,058 | | |

The following candidates were elected: Luís Capoulas (PSD); Lino de Carvalho (CDU); and Luís Capoulas Santos (PS).

==== 1990s ====
===== 1999 =====
Results of the 1999 legislative election held on 10 October 1999:

| Party | | Votes | % | Seats |
|---|---|---|---|---|
| Socialist Party | PS | 42,325 | 46.50% | 2 |
| Unitary Democratic Coalition | CDU | 22,839 | 25.09% | 1 |
| Social Democratic Party | PSD | 17,307 | 19.01% | 1 |
| CDS – People's Party | CDS–PP | 4,683 | 5.14% | 0 |
| Portuguese Workers' Communist Party | PCTP | 1,588 | 1.74% | 0 |
| Left Bloc | BE | 1,392 | 1.53% | 0 |
| People's Monarchist Party | PPM | 364 | 0.40% | 0 |
| The Earth Party Movement | MPT | 336 | 0.37% | 0 |
| National Solidarity Party | PSN | 193 | 0.21% | 0 |
| Valid votes | | 91,027 | 100.00% | 4 |
| Blank votes | | 894 | 0.96% | |
| Rejected votes – other | | 806 | 0.87% | |
| Total polled | | 92,727 | 62.52% | |
| Registered electors | | 148,311 | | |

The following candidates were elected: Lino de Carvalho (CDU); Maria do Céu Ramos (PSD); Luís Capoulas Santos (PS); and Carlos Zorrinho (PS).

===== 1995 =====
Results of the 1995 legislative election held on 1 October 1995:

| Party | | Votes | % | Seats |
|---|---|---|---|---|
| Socialist Party | PS | 44,488 | 43.29% | 2 |
| Unitary Democratic Coalition | CDU | 28,106 | 27.35% | 1 |
| Social Democratic Party | PSD | 21,091 | 20.52% | 1 |
| CDS – People's Party | CDS–PP | 5,453 | 5.31% | 0 |
| Portuguese Workers' Communist Party | PCTP | 2,000 | 1.95% | 0 |
| Popular Democratic Union | UDP | 789 | 0.77% | 0 |
| Revolutionary Socialist Party | PSR | 470 | 0.46% | 0 |
| People's Monarchist Party and The Earth Party Movement | PPM-MPT | 367 | 0.36% | 0 |
| Valid votes | | 102,764 | 100.00% | 4 |
| Blank votes | | 806 | 0.77% | |
| Rejected votes – other | | 930 | 0.89% | |
| Total polled | | 104,500 | 69.19% | |
| Registered electors | | 151,035 | | |

The following candidates were elected: Lino de Carvalho (CDU); Manuela Ferreira Leite (PSD); Luís Capoulas Santos (PS); and Carlos Zorrinho (PS).

===== 1991 =====
Results of the 1991 legislative election held on 6 October 1991:

| Party | | Votes | % | Seats |
|---|---|---|---|---|
| Social Democratic Party | PSD | 36,603 | 35.73% | 2 |
| Unitary Democratic Coalition | CDU | 28,315 | 27.64% | 1 |
| Socialist Party | PS | 27,121 | 26.47% | 1 |
| Social Democratic Centre Party | CDS | 2,953 | 2.88% | 0 |
| Portuguese Workers' Communist Party | PCTP | 2,029 | 1.98% | 0 |
| Revolutionary Socialist Party | PSR | 2,019 | 1.97% | 0 |
| National Solidarity Party | PSN | 1,415 | 1.38% | 0 |
| Democratic Renewal Party | PRD | 825 | 0.81% | 0 |
| People's Monarchist Party | PPM | 608 | 0.59% | 0 |
| Democratic Party of the Atlantic | PDA | 554 | 0.54% | 0 |
| Valid votes | | 102,442 | 100.00% | 4 |
| Blank votes | | 1,174 | 1.12% | |
| Rejected votes – other | | 1,023 | 0.98% | |
| Total polled | | 104,639 | 69.88% | |
| Registered electors | | 149,751 | | |

The following candidates were elected: Ferreira do Amaral (PSD); Luís Capoulas (PSD); Lino de Carvalho (CDU); and Luís Capoulas Santos (PS).

==== 1980s ====
===== 1987 =====
Results of the 1987 legislative election held on 19 July 1987:

| Party | | Votes | % | Seats |
|---|---|---|---|---|
| Unitary Democratic Coalition | CDU | 39,758 | 37.00% | 2 |
| Social Democratic Party | PSD | 35,300 | 32.85% | 2 |
| Socialist Party | PS | 16,907 | 15.73% | 0 |
| Democratic Renewal Party | PRD | 8,485 | 7.90% | 0 |
| Social Democratic Centre Party | CDS | 2,316 | 2.16% | 0 |
| Revolutionary Socialist Party | PSR | 966 | 0.90% | 0 |
| Portuguese Democratic Movement | MDP | 916 | 0.85% | 0 |
| Christian Democratic Party | PDC | 745 | 0.69% | 0 |
| Popular Democratic Union | UDP | 671 | 0.62% | 0 |
| Communist Party (Reconstructed) | PC(R) | 549 | 0.51% | 0 |
| Portuguese Workers' Communist Party | PCTP | 504 | 0.47% | 0 |
| People's Monarchist Party | PPM | 333 | 0.31% | 0 |
| Valid votes | | 107,450 | 100.00% | 4 |
| Blank votes | | 1,178 | 1.07% | |
| Rejected votes – other | | 1,291 | 1.17% | |
| Total polled | | 109,919 | 75.21% | |
| Registered electors | | 146,150 | | |

The following candidates were elected: Vidigal Amaro (CDU); Luís Capoulas (PSD); Lino de Carvalho (CDU); and Armando Cunha (PSD).

===== 1985 =====
Results of the 1985 legislative election held on 6 October 1985:

| Party | | Votes | % | Seats |
|---|---|---|---|---|
| United People Alliance | APU | 48,680 | 42.30% | 2 |
| Social Democratic Party | PSD | 22,561 | 19.60% | 1 |
| Democratic Renewal Party | PRD | 18,707 | 16.25% | 1 |
| Socialist Party | PS | 16,895 | 14.68% | 1 |
| Social Democratic Centre Party | CDS | 3,890 | 3.38% | 0 |
| Popular Democratic Union | UDP | 1,292 | 1.12% | 0 |
| Revolutionary Socialist Party | PSR | 989 | 0.86% | 0 |
| Portuguese Workers' Communist Party | PCTP | 970 | 0.84% | 0 |
| Christian Democratic Party | PDC | 454 | 0.39% | 0 |
| Communist Party (Reconstructed) | PC(R) | 345 | 0.30% | 0 |
| Workers' Party of Socialist Unity | POUS | 312 | 0.27% | 0 |
| Valid votes | | 115,095 | 100.00% | 5 |
| Blank votes | | 1,117 | 0.95% | |
| Rejected votes – other | | 1,889 | 1.60% | |
| Total polled | | 118,101 | 80.86% | |
| Registered electors | | 146,065 | | |

The following candidates were elected: António Barreto (PS); Luís Capoulas (PSD); Joaquim Carmelo (PRD); António Gervásio (APU); and Custódio Gingão (APU).

===== 1983 =====
Results of the 1983 legislative election held on 25 April 1983:

| Party | | Votes | % | Seats |
|---|---|---|---|---|
| United People Alliance | APU | 56,722 | 48.65% | 3 |
| Socialist Party | PS | 28,486 | 24.43% | 1 |
| Social Democratic Party | PSD | 22,184 | 19.03% | 1 |
| Social Democratic Centre Party | CDS | 5,395 | 4.63% | 0 |
| Popular Democratic Union | UDP | 902 | 0.77% | 0 |
| Portuguese Workers' Communist Party | PCTP | 784 | 0.67% | 0 |
| Revolutionary Socialist Party | PSR | 529 | 0.45% | 0 |
| Workers' Party of Socialist Unity | POUS | 526 | 0.45% | 0 |
| People's Monarchist Party | PPM | 458 | 0.39% | 0 |
| Christian Democratic Party | PDC | 400 | 0.34% | 0 |
| Socialist Workers League | LST | 213 | 0.18% | 0 |
| Valid votes | | 116,599 | 100.00% | 5 |
| Blank votes | | 914 | 0.77% | |
| Rejected votes – other | | 1,734 | 1.45% | |
| Total polled | | 119,247 | 84.20% | |
| Registered electors | | 141,623 | | |

The following candidates were elected: Vidigal Amaro (APU); Paulo Manuel Barral (PS); Custódio Gingão (APU); António Murteira (APU); and Mariana Perdigão (PSD).

===== 1980 =====
Results of the 1980 legislative election held on 5 October 1980:

| Party | | Votes | % | Seats |
|---|---|---|---|---|
| United People Alliance | APU | 57,521 | 46.58% | 3 |
| Democratic Alliance | AD | 36,767 | 29.77% | 1 |
| Republican and Socialist Front | FRS | 23,484 | 19.02% | 1 |
| Workers' Party of Socialist Unity | POUS | 1,427 | 1.16% | 0 |
| Popular Democratic Union | UDP | 1,161 | 0.94% | 0 |
| Labour Party | PT | 1,106 | 0.90% | 0 |
| Revolutionary Socialist Party | PSR | 1,065 | 0.86% | 0 |
| Portuguese Workers' Communist Party | PCTP | 777 | 0.63% | 0 |
| Christian Democratic Party, Independent Movement for the National Reconstruction / Party of the Portuguese Right and National Front | PDC- MIRN/ PDP- FN | 183 | 0.15% | 0 |
| Valid votes | | 123,491 | 100.00% | 5 |
| Blank votes | | 771 | 0.61% | |
| Rejected votes – other | | 1,672 | 1.33% | |
| Total polled | | 125,934 | 89.61% | |
| Registered electors | | 140,538 | | |

The following candidates were elected: Manuel da Costa (FRS); António Gervásio (APU); Custódio Gingão (APU); José Ildefonso Oliveira (APU); and Francisco de Sousa Tavares (AD).

==== 1970s ====
===== 1979 =====
Results of the 1979 legislative election held on 2 December 1979:

| Party | | Votes | % | Seats |
|---|---|---|---|---|
| United People Alliance | APU | 61,480 | 50.07% | 3 |
| Democratic Alliance | AD | 33,857 | 27.57% | 1 |
| Socialist Party | PS | 21,229 | 17.29% | 1 |
| Popular Democratic Union | UDP | 2,071 | 1.69% | 0 |
| Portuguese Workers' Communist Party | PCTP | 1,114 | 0.91% | 0 |
| Christian Democratic Party | PDC | 1,110 | 0.90% | 0 |
| Revolutionary Socialist Party | PSR | 1,095 | 0.89% | 0 |
| Left-wing Union for the Socialist Democracy | UEDS | 841 | 0.68% | 0 |
| Valid votes | | 122,797 | 100.00% | 5 |
| Blank votes | | 1,131 | 0.90% | |
| Rejected votes – other | | 1,913 | 1.52% | |
| Total polled | | 125,841 | 90.83% | |
| Registered electors | | 138,546 | | |

The following candidates were elected: Josefina Andrade (APU); Manuel da Costa (PS); António Gervásio (APU); José Ildefonso Oliveira (APU); and Francisco de Sousa Tavares (AD).

===== 1976 =====
Results of the 1976 legislative election held on 25 April 1976:

| Party | | Votes | % | Seats |
|---|---|---|---|---|
| Portuguese Communist Party | PCP | 52,291 | 44.63% | 4 |
| Socialist Party | PS | 36,679 | 31.30% | 2 |
| Democratic People's Party | PPD | 11,107 | 9.48% | 0 |
| Social Democratic Centre Party | CDS | 9,645 | 8.23% | 0 |
| Popular Democratic Union | UDP | 3,151 | 2.69% | 0 |
| People's Socialist Front | FSP | 1,491 | 1.27% | 0 |
| People's Monarchist Party | PPM | 844 | 0.72% | 0 |
| Movement of Socialist Left | MES | 790 | 0.67% | 0 |
| Worker–Peasant Alliance | AOC | 409 | 0.35% | 0 |
| Re-Organized Movement of the Party of the Proletariat | MRPP | 407 | 0.35% | 0 |
| Internationalist Communist League | LCI | 358 | 0.31% | 0 |
| Valid votes | | 117,172 | 100.00% | 6 |
| Rejected votes | | 4,024 | 3.32% | |
| Total polled | | 121,196 | 88.43% | |
| Registered electors | | 137,049 | | |

The following candidates were elected: Etelvina Almeida (PS); Custódio Gingão (PCP); Manuel Gusmão (PCP); José Paiva Jara (PCP); António Rodrigues (PS); and Raul Rodrigues (PCP).
