= 2024 European Parliament election in Portugal =

- 9 June 2024

All 21 Portuguese seats to the European Parliament
- Turnout: 36.6% ▲5.9 pp
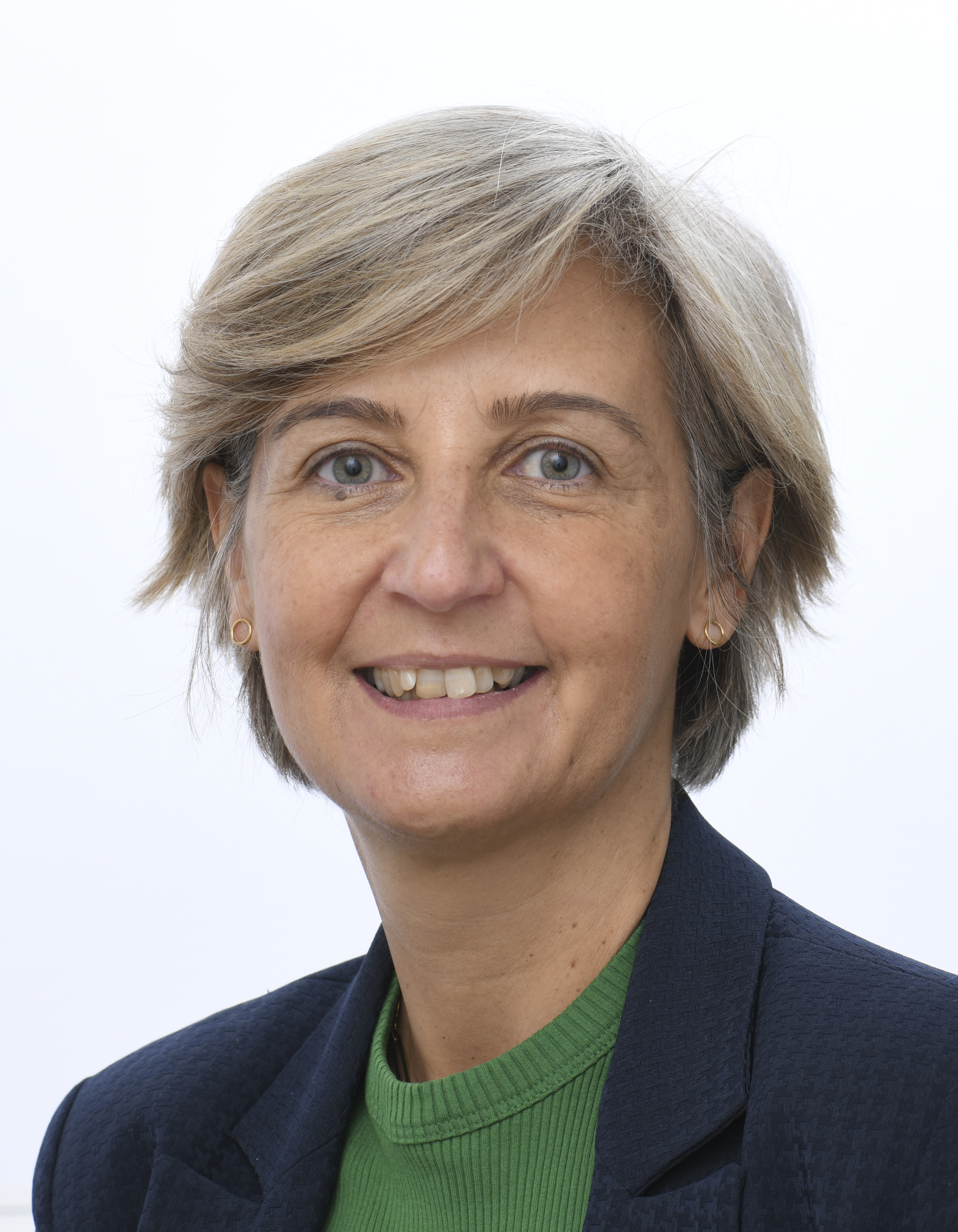

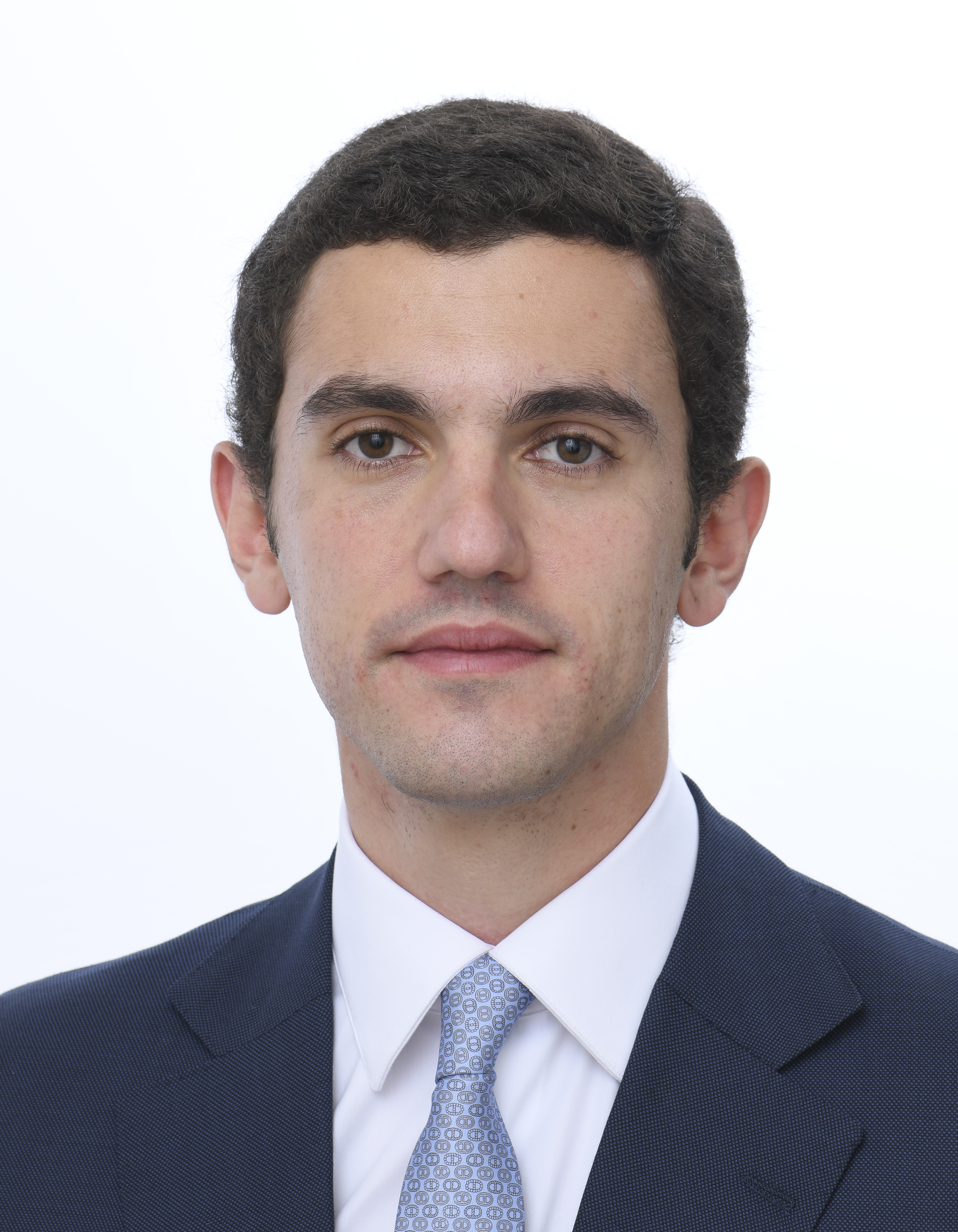

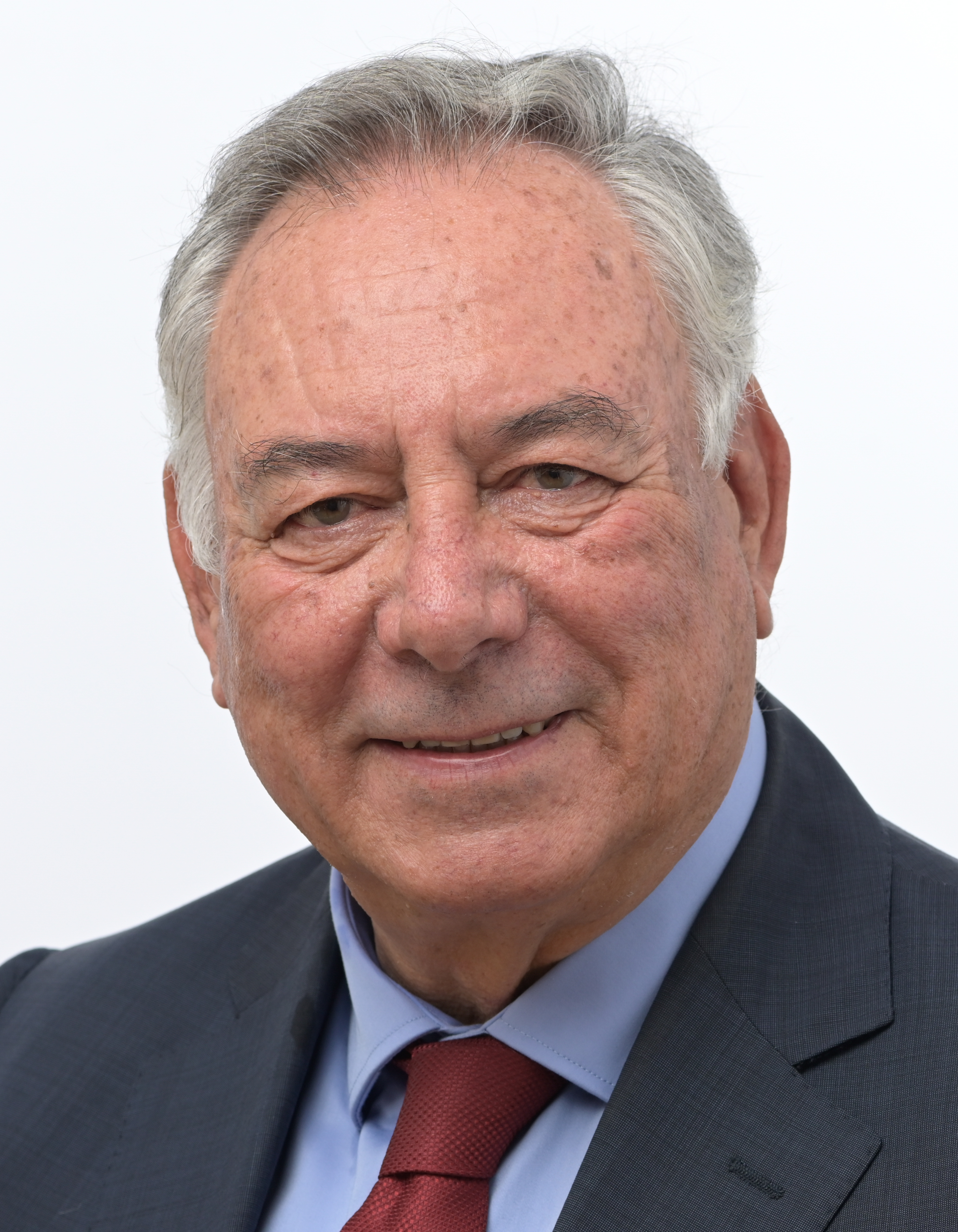

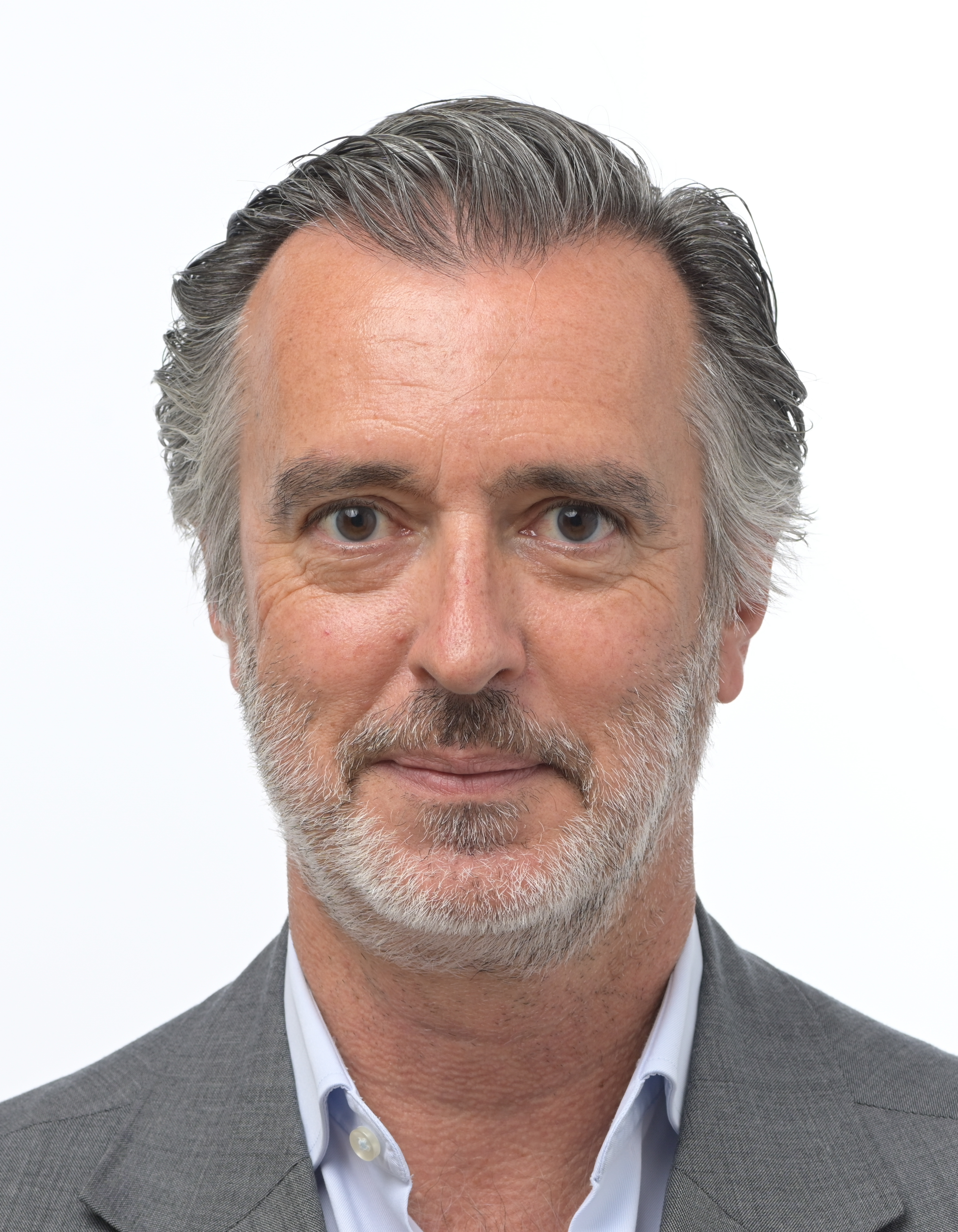

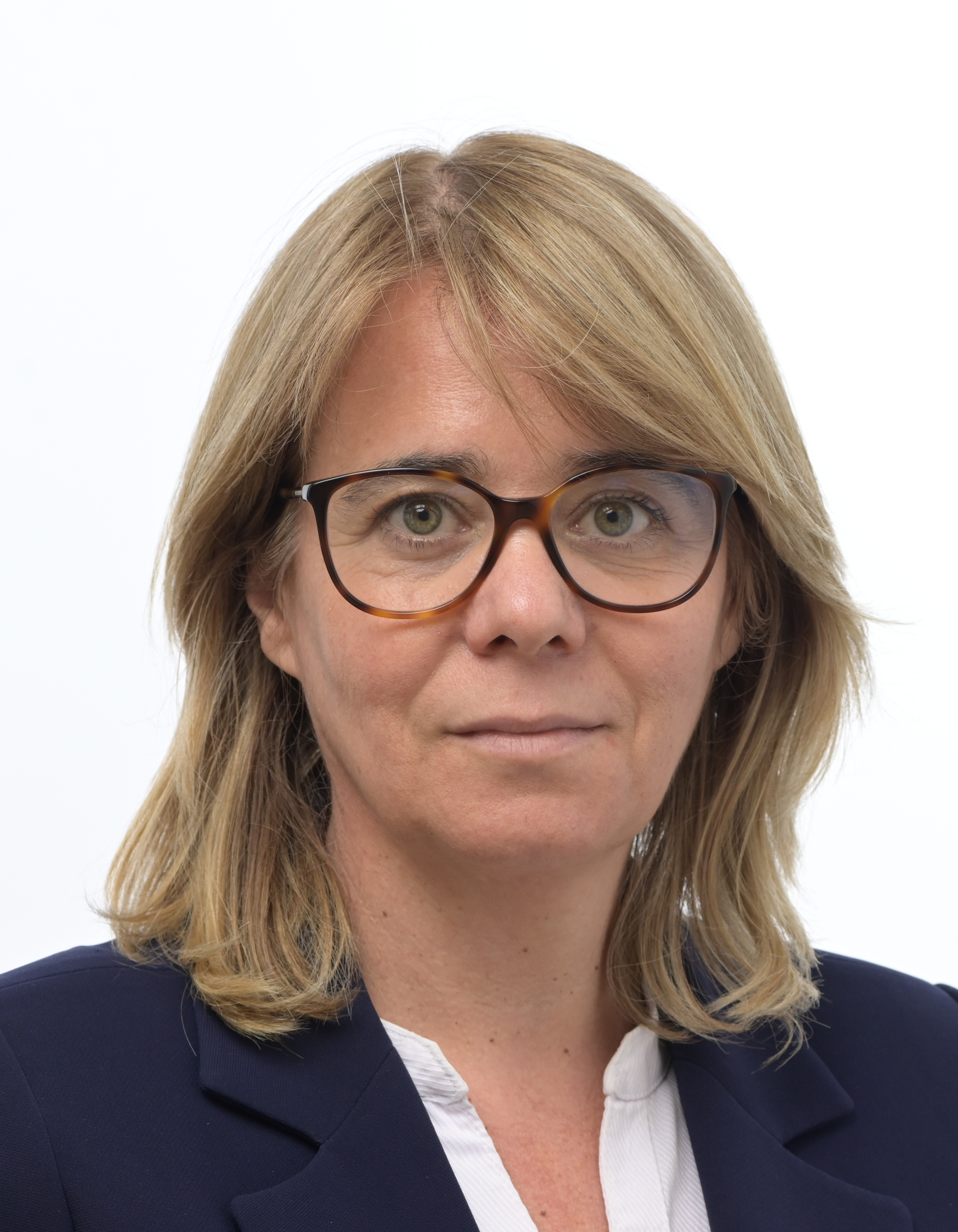

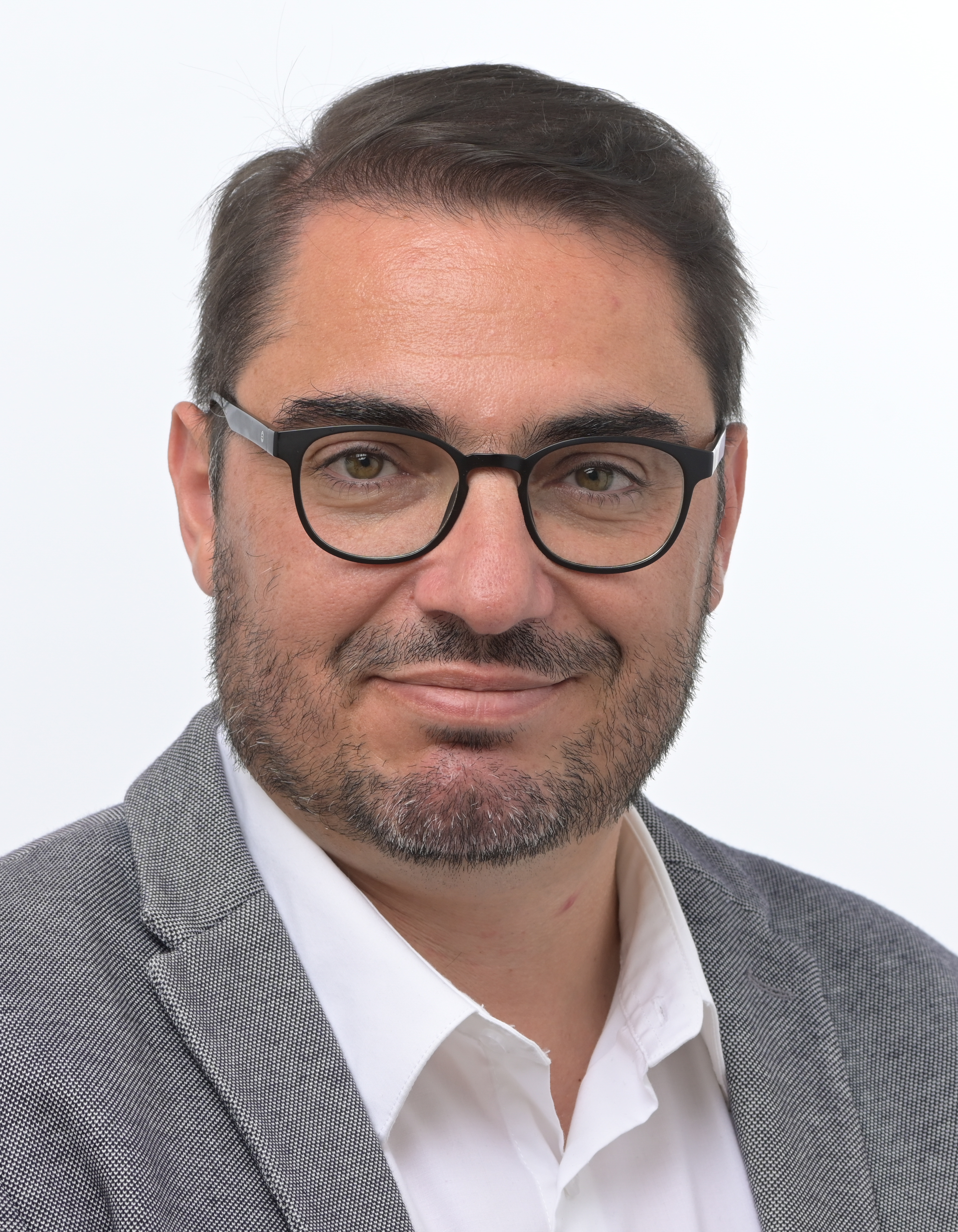
	First party	Second party	Third party
Leader	Marta Temido	Sebastião Bugalho	António Tânger Corrêa
Party	PS	AD	CH
Alliance	S&D	EPP	PfE
Last election	9 seats, 33.4%	7 seats, 28.1% (Note: Social Democratic Party (PPD/PSD) got 21.9% of the vote and elected 6 MEPs while the CDS – People's Party (CDS–PP) got 6.2% and elected 1 in the 2019 elections. The two parties ran together in 2024.)	0 seats (B) (Note: Chega (CH) ran in a coalition with the People's Monarchist Party (PPM) and Citizenship and Christian Democracy Party (PPV/CDC) called Basta!, getting 1.5% of the votes and failing to elect any MEPs in the 2019 election.)
Seats won	8	7	2
Seat change	▼1	0	▲2
Popular vote	1,268,915	1,229,895	387,068
Percentage	32.1%	31.1%	9.8%
Swing	▼1.3 pp	▲3.0 pp (Note: In 2019, the Social Democratic Party (PPD/PSD) and the CDS – People's Party (CDS–PP) had a combined total of 28.12% of the votes. Together, their share increased by 3.00▲.)
	Fourth party	Fifth party	Sixth party
Leader	João Cotrim de Figueiredo	Catarina Martins	João Oliveira
Party	IL	BE	CDU
Alliance	RE	GUE/NGL	GUE/NGL
Last election	0 seats, 0.9%	2 seats, 9.8%	2 seats, 6.9%
Seats won	2	1	1
Seat change	▲2	▼1	▼1
Popular vote	358,811	168,107	162,630
Percentage	9.1%	4.3%	4.1%
Swing	▲8.2 pp	▼5.5 pp	▼2.8 pp
- Map of districts and autonomous regions.

An election was held in Portugal on Sunday, 9 June 2024, to elect the Portuguese delegation to the European Parliament from 2024 to 2029. It took place as part of the wider 2024 European Parliament election. This was the ninth European Parliament election held in Portugal. This election took place just three months after the 10 March 2024 legislative election, which resulted in a very narrow win for the Democratic Alliance, thus was seen as a "second round" of the March elections.

The Socialist Party (PS) narrowly polled ahead of the Democratic Alliance (AD), 32 percent versus 31 percent, although the result nearly mirrored the also very narrow result of the March 2024 legislative election. In terms of seats, the Socialists had a net loss of one, winning 8, while the AD held their 7 seats won in 2019. It was the first national election, in democratic Portugal, where a woman led her party's list to victory.

The major defeated in the election was Chega (CH), gathering less than 10 percent and winning just two seats, a result well below the 18 percent of the votes in the March election. The Liberal Initiative (IL) scored a strong result, 9 percent and 2 seats, in addition to polling very close to Chega. The Left Bloc (BE) and the Unitary Democratic Coalition (CDU) lost considerable ground, gathering just 4.2 and 4.1 percent, respectively, and holding both one seat, while Livre, although increasing its share, failed to win a seat. People–Animals–Nature (PAN) performed badly, losing their sole seat, and polling behind the far-right National Democratic Alternative (ADN).

For the first time in 20 years, voter turnout increased with a total of 36.6 percent of voters casting a ballot. In Portugal alone, turnout stood at 42.3 percent, the highest share since 1989. The final and certified election results were published in the Portuguese official journal, Diário da República, on 28 June 2024.

== Background ==
=== Electoral system ===
The voting method used, for the election of European members of parliament, is by proportional representation using the D'Hondt method. For the 2024 European Parliament elections, Portugal had 21 seats to fill. Members of Parliament are elected in a single constituency, corresponding to the entire national territory.

=== Date ===
The proposed election day, 9 June, conflicted with the Portugal Day holiday on 10 June, as well as with other several local holidays. The government feared that an election close to so many holidays would suppress turnout and attempted to find a compromise with EU countries to find an alternative date, but, no unanimity was reached and the election was then expected to be held on 9 June.

On 4 April 2024, the President of the Republic, Marcelo Rebelo de Sousa, signed the decree that confirmed the date of the elections for the European Parliament on 9 June 2024.

=== Candidates selection ===
After winning the 2024 legislative election within the Democratic Alliance coalition, the Social Democratic Party, the CDS – People's Party and the People's Monarchist Party decided to run again in the following European Parliament election. Incumbent independent Mayor of Porto, Rui Moreira, was widely expected to be the main candidate of the AD, even though it raised some concerns within the PSD, as the party was part of the opposition in Porto City Council. In the end, unexpectedly, Luís Montenegro chose journalist and political commentator Sebastião Bugalho as the main candidate, after inviting Rui Moreira to be the second candidate, to which he refused.

Meanwhile, the Socialist Party had a number of potential candidates, such as former Minister of Parliamentary Affairs Ana Catarina Mendes, former Minister of Health Marta Temido, former Minister of Education Tiago Brandão Rodrigues, former MEP Francisco Assis, former European Commissioner António Vitorino, and even former Prime Minister António Costa, as a launching ramp for a candidacy for President of the European Council. In the end, Pedro Nuno Santos chose Marta Temido as the main candidate.

Following the party's strong performance in the March legislative election, there was some expectation about who would be Chega's main candidate. Ultimately, André Ventura selected former ambassador António Tânger Corrêa as the party's leading candidate for the election. Even so, the candidate lacked name recognition in the electorate, and during the campaign, voters had doubts about who the party's candidate really was.

In LIVRE, the process to select candidates was controversial. A primary was held, in which Francisco Paupério defeated the preferred candidate by party leader Rui Tavares, Filipa Pinto, in the first round. For the primary runoff, the party leadership tried to change voting rules, limiting the vote only to party members, by alleging evidence of external interference. However, this action received strong backlash and was eventually dropped, with Francisco Paupério being confirmed as the party's main candidate in the runoff.

=== Early voting ===
Voters were also able to vote early, which happened on 2 June, one week before election day. Voters had to register between 26 and 30 May 2024 in order to be eligible to cast an early ballot. By the 30 May deadline, 252,208 voters had requested to vote early, a number thirteen times higher than in 2019, and also higher than in the 2024 March legislative election. On 2 June, 225,039 voters (89.2 percent of voters that requested) cast an early ballot.

== Parties and candidates ==
=== Portuguese delegation in the European Parliament before the elections ===
European Parliament group	Mandates	National party	Mandates
S&D; Progressive Alliance of Socialists and Democrats	9 / 21	PS; Socialist Party	9 / 21
EPP; European People's Party Group	7 / 21	PPD/PSD; Social Democratic Party	6 / 21
EPP; European People's Party Group	7 / 21	CDS–PP; CDS – People's Party	1 / 21
The Left; The Left in the European Parliament – GUE/NGL	4 / 21	BE; Left Bloc	2 / 21
The Left; The Left in the European Parliament – GUE/NGL	4 / 21	CDU; Unitary Democratic Coalition	2 / 21
Greens/EFA; Greens–European Free Alliance	1 / 21	PAN; People Animals Nature	0 / 21
Greens/EFA; Greens–European Free Alliance	1 / 21	Francisco Guerreiro (Note: Francisco Guerreiro was elected MEP in 2019 in the PAN list, but he left PAN in June 2020 and since then became an independent seated in the European Green Party.); Independent	1 / 21
Source: European Parliament

=== Parties running in the election ===
This is a list of the parties that were on the ballot and their main candidates.

Party		European Party	Group	2019 result	Top candidate	Ref.
PS	Socialist Party	PES	S&D	33.4	Marta Temido	
AD	Democratic Alliance: Social Democratic Party; CDS – People's Party; People's Monarchist Party	EPP / ECPM	EPP	28.1	Sebastião Bugalho	
BE	Left Bloc	PEL	The Left	9.8	Catarina Martins	
CDU	Unitary Democratic Coalition: Portuguese Communist Party; Ecologist Party "The Greens"	NI / EGP	The Left / Greens/EFA	6.9	João Oliveira	
PAN	People-Animals-Nature	EGP	Greens/EFA	5.1	Pedro Fidalgo Marques	
L	LIVRE	EGP	Greens/EFA	1.8	Francisco Paupério	
CH	Chega	ID	Patriots	1.5	António Tânger Corrêa	
NC	We, the Citizens!	ALDE Party	NI	1.1	Pedro Ladeira	
IL	Liberal Initiative	ALDE Party	Renew	0.9	João Cotrim de Figueiredo	
E	Rise Up	AENM	NI	0.5	Rui Fonseca e Castro	
ADN	National Democratic Alternative	NI	NI	0.5 (Note: As Democratic Republican Party in 2019)	Joana Amaral Dias	
PTP	Portuguese Labour Party	NI	NI	0.3	José Manuel Coelho	
MAS	Socialist Alternative Movement	NI	NI	0.2	Gil Garcia	
RIR	React, Include, Recycle	−	−	−	Márcia Henriques	
MPT	Earth Party	−	EPP	−	Manuel Carreira	
VP	Volt Portugal	Volt	−	−	Duarte Costa	
ND	New Right	−	−	−	Ossanda Liber	

== Campaign ==
=== Issues ===
The campaign was dominated by issues like immigration and defence, with national politics also an issue due to the narrow victory of the Democratic Alliance in the 10 March legislative elections and the unstable situation of Luís Montenegro's minority government, with the prospect of a possible snap election in the short term.

=== Party slogans ===
Party or alliance	Original slogan	English translation	Refs
PS	« O futuro de Portugal na Europa »	"Portugal's future in Europe"	
AD	« Voz na Europa »	"Voice in Europe"	
BE	« Europa por ti, salvar o futuro »	"Europe for you, save the future."	
CDU	« Sempre contigo para o que der e vier »	"Always with you no matter what happens"	
PAN	« Pelo planeta, por ti, pelos animais »	"For the planet, for you, for the animals"	
L	« Por uma Europa Unida e LIVRE »	"For a United and FREE Europe"	
CH	« Uma Europa de nações livres »	"A Europe of free nations"	
IL	« Com Cotrim Sim »	"With Cotrim Yes"	

=== Candidates' debates ===
==== With parties represented in the national Parliament ====
2024 Portuguese European Parliament election debates
Date	Organisers	Moderator(s)	P Present (Note: Denotes a main invitee attending the event.) S Surrogate (Note: Denotes a main invitee not attending the event, sending a surrogate in their place.) NI Not invited I Invited A Absent invitee								
Date	Organisers	Moderator(s)	PS	AD	BE	CDU	PAN	L	CH	IL	Ref.
13 May	SIC	Clara de Sousa	P Temido	P Bugalho	NI	NI	NI	P Paupério	NI	P Cotrim	
15 May	RTP1	Carlos Daniel	NI	NI	P Martins	NI	P Marques	P Paupério	P Corrêa	NI	
17 May	TVI	Sara Pinto	NI	NI	P Martins	P Oliveira	NI	P Paupério	NI	P Cotrim	
20 May	SIC	Clara de Sousa	NI	NI	NI	P Oliveira	P Marques	NI	P Corrêa	P Cotrim	
21 May	RTP1	Carlos Daniel	P Temido	P Bugalho	NI	P Oliveira	NI	NI	P Corrêa	NI	
22 May	Observador	Ricardo Conceição	NI	NI	NI	NI	NI	P Paupério	P Corrêa	NI	
22 May	Observador	Ricardo Conceição	NI	NI	P Martins	NI	P Marques	NI	NI	NI	
23 May	Observador	Sara Antunes de Oliveira	NI	NI	NI	NI	P Marques	NI	P Corrêa	NI	
23 May	Observador	Ricardo Conceição	NI	NI	P Martins	P Oliveira	NI	NI	NI	NI	
23 May	Observador	Ricardo Conceição	NI	P Bugalho	NI	NI	NI	NI	NI	P Cotrim	
24 May	Observador	Ricardo Conceição	NI	NI	NI	P Oliveira	NI	NI	NI	P Cotrim	
24 May	TVI	Sara Pinto	P Temido	P Bugalho	P Martins	NI	P Marques	NI	NI	NI	
28 May	RTP1	Carlos Daniel	P Temido	P Bugalho	P Martins	P Oliveira	P Marques	P Paupério	P Corrêa	P Cotrim	
29 May	Observador	Ricardo Conceição	NI	P Bugalho	NI	NI	NI	P Paupério	NI	NI	
3 Jun	Antena 1 TSF; Renascença; Observador	Natália Carvalho; Ricardo Alexandre; Susana Madureira; Martins; Rui Pedro Antunes	P Temido	P Bugalho	P Martins	P Oliveira	P Marques	P Paupério	P Corrêa	P Cotrim	

==== With parties not represented in the national Parliament ====
2024 Portuguese European Parliament election debates
Date	Organisers	Moderator(s)	P Present (Note: Denotes a main invitee attending the event.) S Surrogate (Note: Denotes a main invitee not attending the event, sending a surrogate in their place.) NI Not invited I Invited A Absent invitee									
Date	Organisers	Moderator(s)	NC	E	ADN	PTP	MAS	RIR	MPT	VP	ND	Ref.
30 May	RTP1	Carlos Daniel	P Ladeira	P Castro	P Dias	P Coelho (Note: Via videotelephony)	P Garcia	P Henriques	P Carreira	P Costa	P Liber	

== Opinion polling ==
Polls that show their results without distributing those respondents who are undecided or said they would abstain from voting, are re-calculated by removing these numbers from the totals through a simple rule of three, in order to obtain results comparable to other polls and the official election results.

Exit poll

Polling firm/Link	Fieldwork date	Sample size	Turnout	PS	Democratic Alliance (Portugal, 2024)			CH	BE	CDU	PAN	L	IL	O	Lead
Polling firm/Link	Fieldwork date	Sample size	Turnout	PS	PSD	CDS–PP	PPM	CH	BE	CDU	PAN	L	IL	O	Lead
Polling firm/Link	Fieldwork date	Sample size	Turnout	S&D	EPP	EPP	NI	PfE	Left	Left	G/EFA	G/EFA	Renew	O	Lead
2024 EP election	9 Jun 2024	—N/a	36.6	32.1; 8	31.1; 7			9.8; 2	4.3; 1	4.1; 1	1.2; 0	3.8; 0	9.1; 2	4.5; 0	1.0
CESOP–UCP	9 Jun 2024	14,185	37–40	28–34; 6/8	28–33; 6/8			8–12; 2/3	3–5; 0/1	3–5; 0/1	1–2; 0	3–5; 0/1	8–12; 2/3	—	0.5
ICS/ISCTE–GfK/Metris	9 Jun 2024	15,839	36.7	29.2–33.6; 7/8	28.4–32.8; 7/8			7.5–10.9; 2/3	2.8–5.8; 0/1	2.8–5.8; 0/1	0.4–2.0; 0	2.9–5.9; 0/1	8.1–11.5; 2/3	3.3–6.3; 0	0.8
Pitagórica	9 Jun 2024	24,619	35.5–41.5	27.7–33.7; 6/8	26.0–32.0; 6/8			6.6–12.6; 2/3	3.0–7.0; 0/1	2.0–6.0; 0/1	0.7–2.7; 0	2.5–6.5; 0/1	8.3–12.3; 2/3	—	1.7
Intercampus	9 Jun 2024	19,502	38–42	27.2–33.2; 6/8	26.9–32.9; 6/8			7.5–11.5; 2/3	3.1–6.1; 0/1	2.3–5.3; 0/1	0.3–2.3; 0	3.0–6.0; 0/1	8.3–12.3; 2/3	2.8–8.8; 0	0.3
Intercampus (Note: Results presented here exclude undecideds (12.5%). With their inclusion results are: AD: 24.8%; PS: 24.1%; CH: 12.0%; IL: 9.1%; BE: 5.8%; Livre: 4.5%; PAN: 3.1%; CDU: 2.5%; Others/Invalid: 1.8%.)	29 May–4 Jun 2024	604	?	27.5; 7	28.3; 7			13.7; 3	6.6; 1	2.9; 0	3.5; 0	5.1; 1	10.4; 2	2.0; 0	0.8
CESOP–UCP	27 May–3 Jun 2024	1,552	?	33; 7/9	31; 6/8			12; 2/4	4; 0/1	4; 0/1	1; 0	4; 0/1	8; 1/2	3; 0	2
Aximage	17–22 May 2024	801	55.3	30.6; 7/8	26.6; 6			15.5; 4	6.3; 1	3.5; 0	1.6; 0	5.2; 1	7.5; 1/2	3.2; 0	4.0
Intercampus (Note: Results presented here exclude undecideds (3.7%). With their inclusion results are: PS: 22.2%; AD: 21.2%; CH: 17.4%; IL: 11.6%; BE: 8.9%; Livre: 6.6%; PAN: 3.9%; CDU: 3.6%; Others/Invalid: 0.9%.)	12–20 May 2024	609	?	23.1; 5	22.0; 5			18.1; 4	9.2; 2	3.7; 0	4.0; 1	6.9; 1	12.0; 3	1.0; 0	1.1
CESOP–UCP	13–18 May 2024	965	?	30; 6/8	31; 6/8			15; 3/4	5; 1	5; 1	1; 0	5; 1	6; 1/2	2; 0	1
Duplimétrica	6–13 May 2024	800	?	34; 9	32; 8			10; 2	3; 0	3; 0	1; 0	3; 0	9; 2	5; 0	2
ICS/ISCTE	27 Apr–8 May 2024	1,001	?	32; 8	26; 6			18; 4	5; 1	4; 1	2; 0	2; 0	4; 1	7; 0	6
Intercampus (Note: Results presented here exclude undecideds (17.5%). With their inclusion results are: PS: 27.5%; AD: 23.2%; CH: 10.7%; BE: 6.1%; Livre: 4.8%; IL: 3.6%; CDU: 2.7%; PAN: 1.1%; Others/Invalid: 2.7%.)	18–23 Apr 2024	605	?	33.4; 8	28.2; 7			13.0; 3	7.4; 1	3.3; 0	1.3; 0	5.8; 1	4.4; 1	3.3; 0	5.2
Aximage	12–16 Apr 2024	805	58.0	31.3; 7/8	24.8; 6			18.4; 4	5.9; 1	4.1; 1	1.8; 0	3.6; 0/1	5.8; 1	4.3; 0	6.5
2024 legislative elections	10 Mar 2024	—N/a	59.8	28.0 (7)	28.8 (7)			18.1 (5)	4.4 (1)	3.2 (0)	1.9 (0)	3.2 (0)	4.9 (1)	7.5 (0)	0.8
Ipsos	23 Feb–5 Mar 2024	2,000	?	29.6; 8	31.0; 8	3.4; 0	–	14.2; 3	4.4; 1	2.3; 0	2.1; 0	3.6; 0	4.5; 1	4.9; 0	1.4
2022 legislative elections	30 Jan 2022	—N/a	51.5	41.4 (10)	29.1 (7)	1.6 (0)	0.0 (0)	7.2 (1)	4.4 (1)	4.3 (1)	1.6 (0)	1.3 (0)	4.9 (1)	4.7 (0)	12.3
2019 legislative elections	6 Oct 2019	—N/a	48.6	36.3 (10)	27.8 (7)	4.2 (1)	0.2 (0)	1.3 (0)	9.5 (2)	6.3 (1)	3.3 (0)	1.1 (0)	1.3 (0)	8.8 (0)	8.5
2019 EP election	26 May 2019	—N/a	30.7	33.4; 9	21.9; 6	6.2; 1	1.5; 0		9.8; 2	6.9; 2	5.1; 1	1.8; 0	0.9; 0	12.5; 0	11.5

== Voter turnout ==
The table below shows voter turnout throughout election day including voters from Overseas.

Turnout	Time								
Turnout	12:00			16:00			19:00		
Turnout	2019	2024	±	2019	2024	±	2019	2024	±
Total	11.56%	14.48%	▲2.92 pp	23.37%	27.89%	▲4.52 pp	30.75%	36.63%	▲5.88 pp

== Results ==
Party and European Parliament group		Votes	%	+/–	Seats	+/–
Socialist Party	S&D	1,268,915	32.11	–1.29	8	–1
Democratic Alliance	EPP	1,229,895	31.12	+3.00	7	0
Chega	PfE	387,068	9.79	+8.30	2	+2
Liberal Initiative	Renew	358,811	9.08	+8.20	2	+2
Left Bloc	GUE/NGL	168,107	4.25	–5.58	1	–1
Unitary Democratic Coalition	GUE/NGL	162,630	4.12	–2.77	1	–1
LIVRE	G/EFA	148,572	3.76	+1.93	0	0
National Democratic Alternative	NI	54,120	1.37	+0.89	0	0
People Animals Nature	G/EFA	48,006	1.21	–3.87	0	–1
Volt Portugal	G/EFA	9,445	0.24	New	0	New
Ergue-te	NI	8,302	0.21	–0.28	0	0
React, Include, Recycle	NI	6,407	0.16	New	0	New
Nova Direita	NI	6,361	0.16	New	0	New
Socialist Alternative Movement	NI	5,016	0.13	–0.07	0	0
Earth Party	EPP	4,558	0.12	New	0	New
Portuguese Labour Party	NI	4,312	0.11	–0.14	0	0
We, the Citizens!	Renew	4,246	0.11	–0.94	0	0
Total		3,874,771	100.00	–	21	0
Valid votes		3,874,771	98.05	+4.97		
Invalid votes		29,731	0.75	–1.91		
Blank votes		47,477	1.20	–3.05		
Total votes		3,951,979	100.00	–		
Registered voters/turnout		10,789,781	36.63	+5.88		
Source: Comissão Nacional de Eleições

Vote share
PS	32.11%
AD	31.12%
CH	9.79%
IL	9.08%
BE	4.25%
CDU	4.12%
L	3.76%
ADN	1.37%
PAN	1.21%
Others	1.24%
Blank/Invalid	1.95%

Seats
PS	38.10%
AD	33.33%
CH	9.52%
IL	9.52%
BE	4.76%
CDU	4.76%

=== Distribution by European group ===
Summary of political group distribution in the 10th European Parliament (2024–2029)
Groups	Parties	Seats	Total	%
Progressive Alliance of Socialists and Democrats (S&D)	Socialist Party (PS)	8	8	38.10
European People's Party (EPP)	Social Democratic Party (PSD); People's Party (CDS–PP)	6; 1	7	33.33
Patriots for Europe (PfE)	Chega (CH)	2	2	9.52
Renew Europe (RE)	Liberal Initiative (IL)	2	2	9.52
European United Left–Nordic Green Left (GUE/NGL)	Left Bloc (BE); Portuguese Communist Party (PCP)	1; 1	2	9.52
Total		21	21	100.00

=== Maps ===
Most voted party/coalition by municipality: AD (orange), PS (pink)

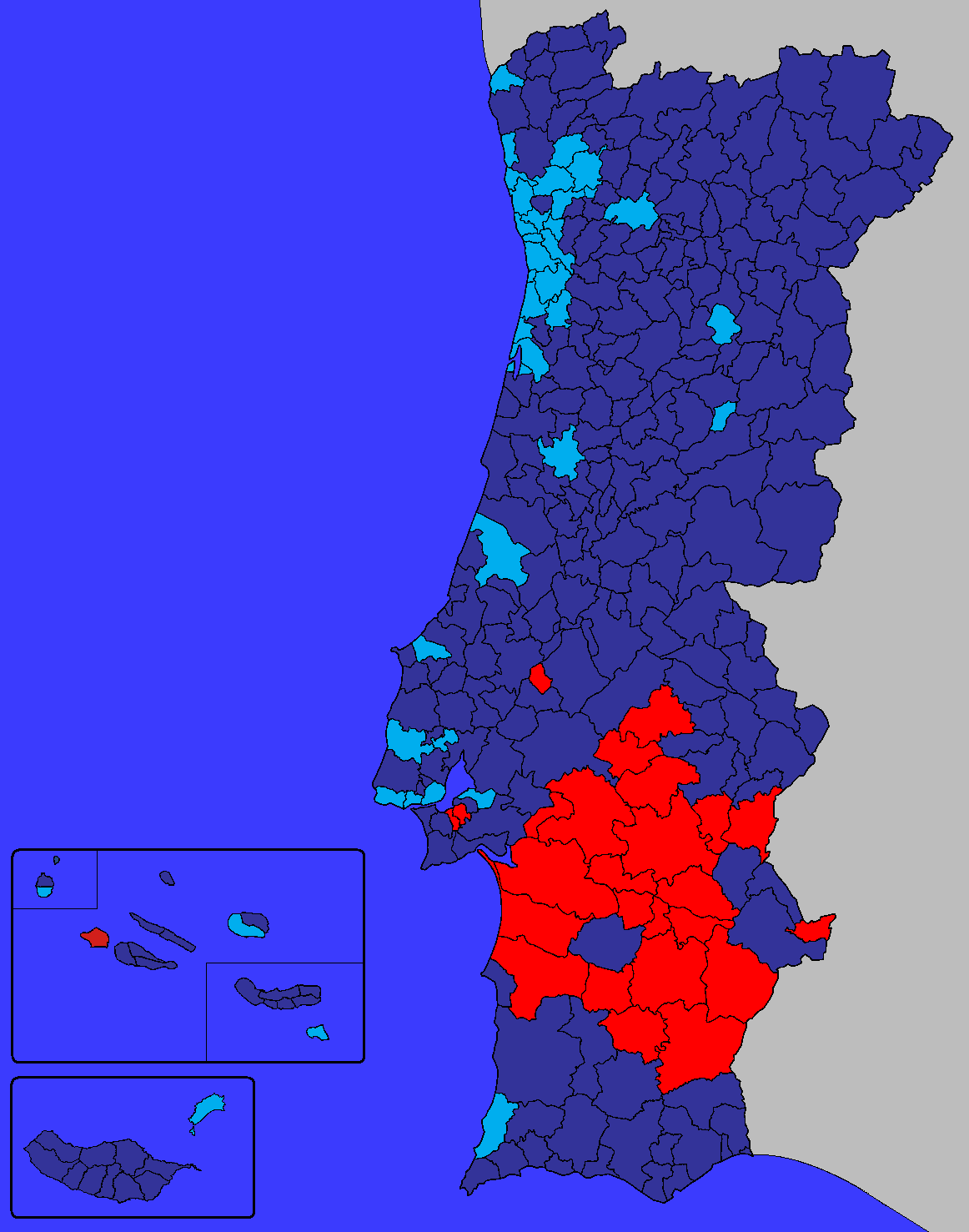
Most voted party/coalition by municipality besides AD and PS: CH (darkblue), IL (lightblue), CDU (red), BE (darkred)

=== Demographics ===
Demographic	Size	PS	AD	CH	IL	BE	CDU	L	Others
Total vote	100%	32.1%	31.1%	9.8%	9.1%	4.3%	4.1%	3.8%	5.7%
Sex
Men	46%	30%	30%	13%	11%	3%	5%	4%	5%
Women	54%	35%	32%	7%	8%	5%	4%	4%	6%
Age
18–34 years old	22%	15%	29%	10%	19%	6%	3%	9%	9%
65 years and older	24%	48%	31%	6%	2%	3%	6%	1%	4%
Education
No/with High-school	53%	39%	28%	12%	5%	3%	4%	2%	6%
College graduate	47%	26%	33%	7%	13%	5%	4%	5%	6%
Source: ICS/ISCTE–GfK/Metris exit poll

== See also ==
- 2024 European Parliament election
- Politics of Portugal
- List of political parties in Portugal
