= Carlos Zorrinho =

Portuguese politician

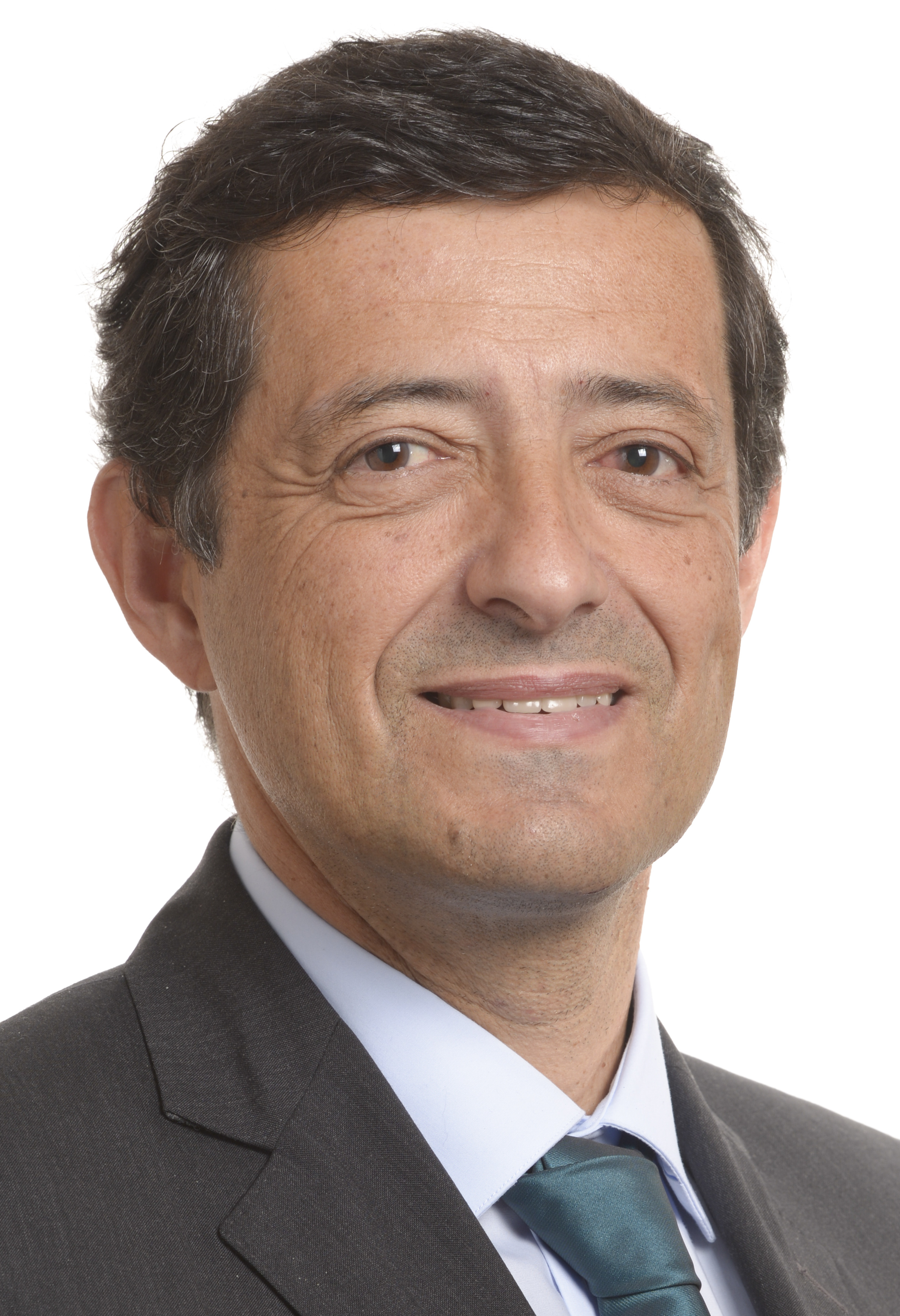
- Official portrait as an MEP, 2019

Mayor of Évora
- Incumbent
- Assumed office 3 November 2025
- Preceded by: Carlos Pinto de Sá

Member of the European Parliament for Portugal
- In office 1 July 2014 – 15 July 2024

Member of the Assembly of the Republic
- In office 1 October 1995 – 30 June 2014
- Constituency: Évora

Personal details
- Born: José Carlos das Dores Zorrinho; 28 May 1959 (age 67) Óbidos, Portugal
- Party: Socialist Party
- Spouse: Rosa Valente de Matos
- Children: 2
- Education: University of Évora
- Occupation: Professor • Politician

José Carlos das Dores Zorrinho (born 28 May 1959) is a Portuguese politician and university professor. He held the positions of Secretary of State, leader of the Socialist Party Parliamentary Group at the Portuguese Parliament, and was a Member of the European Parliament (MEP) for the S&D group.

== Early life and education ==
José Carlos das Dores Zorrinho was born on 28 May 1959 in Óbidos, Portugal. He graduated in Business Management at the University of Évora, where he later pursued a Doctorate Degree in Information Management. His academic career followed as a professor at the University of Évora, becoming Full Professor of its Department of Business Administration.

== Political career ==
=== Career in national politics ===
Member of the National Council of the Socialist Party since 1990, he was elected for the first time for the National Parliament in 1995 for the electoral circle of Évora. He was a member of Parliament until 2000, becoming Vice-President of the Socialist Party’s Parliamentary Group in 1999. From 1997 to 1999, he coordinated the ProAlentejo - Programme for the Integrated Development of Alentejo. In 2000, he was elected Member of the National Council for Education. Later that year, he entered office as Secretary of State Deputy to the Minister for Home Office of the XIV Constitutional Government (2000/2002). In 2002, Carlos Zorrinho resumed his academic career at the University of Évora.

After the Socialist Party won the 2005 general elections in Portugal, Zorrinho was appointed National Coordinator of the Lisbon Strategy and the Technological Plan (Portuguese: 'Plano Tecnológico'), which aimed at improving the country’s competitiveness through technology, innovation and knowledge. Under that capacity, he led the development of the Portuguese Digital Agenda, and he reported directly to the Prime-Minister of the XVI Constitutional Government (2005/2009).

From 2009 to 2011, Zorrinho served as Secretary of State for Energy and Innovation, within the Ministry of Economy, Innovation and Development of the XVII Constitutional Government. Returning to the Parliament in 2011, Carlos Zorrinho was elected Leader of the Socialist Party’s Parliamentary Group in September 2011.

=== Member of the European Parliament, 2014–2024 ===
Following the 2014 European elections, Zorrinho became a Member of the European Parliament, where he was Head of the Portuguese Delegation, Vice-chair of the Delegation for the External Relations of the European Parliament to Brazil, Member of the Committee on Industry, Research and Energy (ITRE), EUROLAT and the ACP–EU Joint Parliamentary Assembly.

Zorrinho is also a substitute member of the Committee on the Environment, Public Health and Food Safety (ENVI) and the Parliament's delegation for relations to the MERCOSUR. In addition to his committee assignments, he is a member of the European Parliament Intergroup on Climate Change, Biodiversity and Sustainable Development, the European Parliament Intergroup on Artificial Intelligence and Digital and the European Internet Forum.

Along with Ana Rita Sithole, he was Co-President of the Parliamentary Assembly of the African, Caribbean and Pacific Organization-European Union Joint Parliamentary Assembly in 2023.
