= Institute for Political Studies – Catholic University of Portugal =

Portuguese research institute

Institute for Political Studies - Catholic University of Portugal
- Type: Private
- Established: 1997
- Director: João Carlos Espada
- Location: Palma de Cima, 1649-023 Lisbon, Portugal, Lisbon, Portugal; 38.7486742°N 9.1680629°W
- Website: www.iep.lisboa.ucp.pt

The Institute for Political Studies (Portuguese: Instituto de Estudos Políticos, IEP) of the Catholic University of Portugal (Portuguese: Universidade Católica Portuguesa, UCP) is a Portuguese research institution focusing on political science and political philosophy.

It was created on 1 September 1997, at the Lisbon campus of the Catholic University of Portugal. The IEP was the only Portuguese think tank to get nominated for the top Think Tanks of World, according to The Global "Go-To Think Tanks": The Leading Public Policy Research Organizations in the World, 2008, published by the Think Tanks and Civil Societies Program of the University of Pennsylvania.
