= National Democratic Alternative (Portugal) =

Political party in Portugal

National Democratic Alternative Alternativa Democrática Nacional
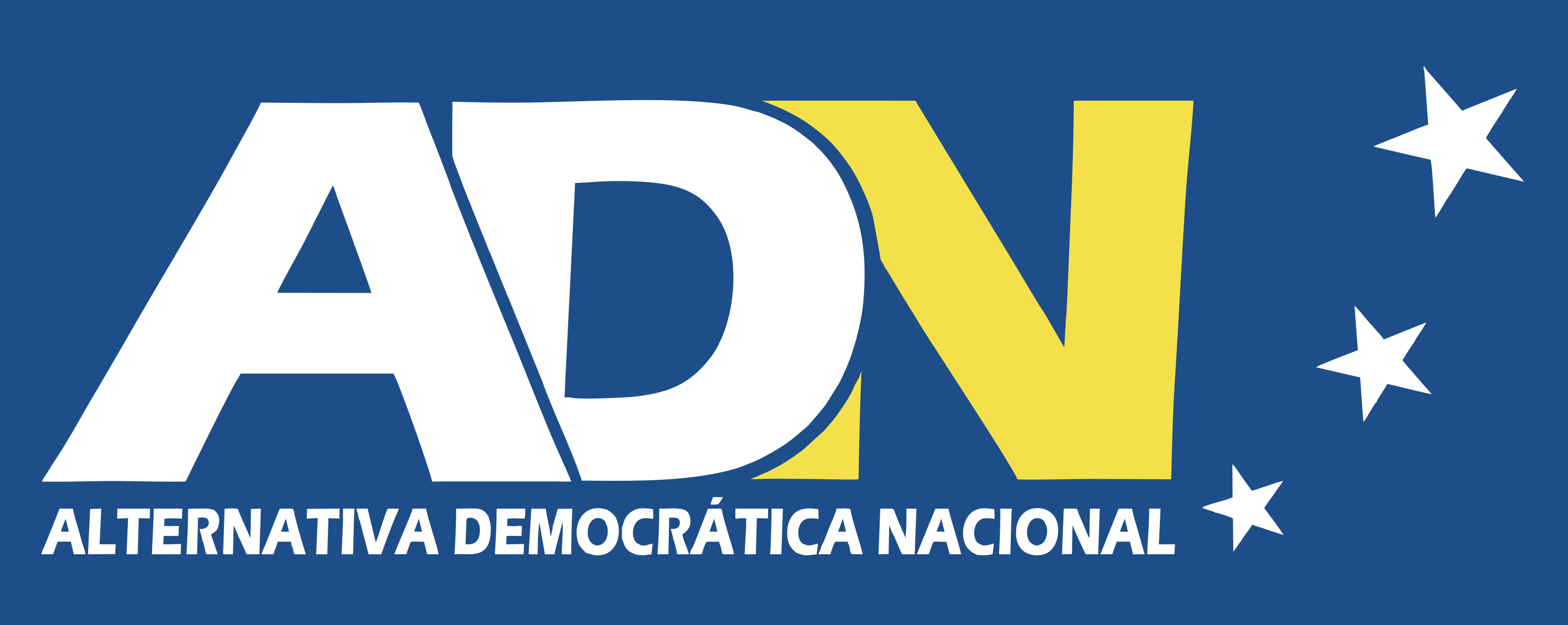
- Abbreviation: ADN
- President: Bruno Fialho
- Founded: 28 September 2021
- Preceded by: Democratic Republican Party
- Headquarters: Estrada da Luz, 71; 1600–165 Lisboa
- Ideology: Social conservatism COVID-19 denialism COVID-19 vaccine hesitancy Climate change denialism Portuguese nationalism
- Political position: Far-right
- European affiliation: European Christian Political Party (candidate)
- Colours: Blue
- Assembly of the Republic: 0 / 230
- European Parliament: 0 / 21
- Regional parliaments: 0 / 104
- Local government: 0 / 2,078

Website
- adn.com.pt

The National Democratic Alternative (Portuguese: Alternativa Democrática Nacional, ADN), originally the Democratic Republican Party (Portuguese: Partido Democrático Republicano, PDR) until October 2021, is a Portuguese political party, founded in 2014.

In 2022, the party attracted some attention for its COVID-19 denialist views after the party president claimed on a televised debate that "there wasn't an excess of mortality in Portugal because of Covid", and that "there is proof that only 152 people died of Covid (in Portugal)".

On 22 September 2022, the party left the European Democratic Party due to ideological divergencies regarding the LGBT community.

The party achieved its best electoral result in the 2024 Portuguese legislative election. During the election it was involved in a controversy with the Democratic Alliance (AD) spearheaded by the Social Democratic Party (PSD). The AD alleged that ADN was taking its votes by having similar initials. Leader Bruno Fialho said that these allegations were evidence that AD leader Luís Montenegro believed that the Portuguese people were stupid; Fialho added that nobody had confused the PSD with its main rival, the Socialist Party (PS).

== Brazilian links ==
The party has a significant support base from Brazilian Evangelical Christians, as Brazilian and Portuguese immigrants have the right to vote in each other's elections. Brazilian congressman and Evangelical pastor Marco Feliciano endorsed the party. Policies that appeal to Evangelicals include opposition to drugs and abortion.

== Election results ==
=== Assembly of the Republic ===
Election	Leader	Votes	%	Seats	+/-	Government
2022	Bruno Fialho	11,451	0.2 (#14)	0 / 230	New	No seats
2024	Bruno Fialho	102,132	1.6 (#9)	0 / 230	0	No seats
2025	Joana Amaral Dias	81,594	1.3 (#9)	0 / 230	0	No seats

=== European Parliament ===
Election	List Leader	Votes	%	Seats	+/–	EP Group
2024	Joana Amaral Dias	81,660	1.4 (#8)	0 / 21	New	–

=== Regional assemblies ===
Region	Election	Leader	Votes	%	Seats	+/-	Government
Azores	2024	Rui Matos	378	0.3 (#10)	0 / 57	New	No seats
Madeira	2024	Miguel Pita	691	0.5 (#12)	0 / 47	0	No seats
