= Joana Amaral Dias =

Portuguese politician and clinical psychologist

Joana Amaral Dias Terrinca
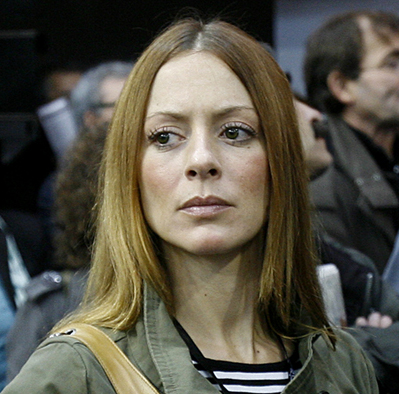
- Amaral Dias in 2009

Member of the Assembly of the Republic
- In office 5 April 2002 – 9 March 2005
- Constituency: Lisbon

Personal details
- Born: Joana Beatriz Nunes Vicente Amaral Dias; 13 May 1975 (age 51) Luanda, Portuguese Angola
- Citizenship: Portugal
- Party: ADN (2024–present)
- Other political affiliations: BE (2002–2014); PTP–MAS (2015); NC (2017)
- Spouse(s): Paulo Monteiro (div.) Pedro Pinto (m. 2022)
- Children: 3
- Parent: Carlos Amaral Dias (father)
- Education: University of Coimbra
- Occupation: Clinical psychologist • Politician

Joana Beatriz Nunes Vicente Amaral Dias (born 13 May 1973) is a Portuguese politician and clinical psychologist. She was a member of the Portuguese Parliament for the Left Bloc (2002–2005). She was the National Democratic Alternative candidate to the 2026 Portuguese presidential election.

Amaral Dias was the National Democratic Alternative head of list for the 2024 European Parliament election.

== Personal life ==
She is the daughter of psychiatrist Carlos Amaral Dias. Besides clinical practice, university teaching and scientific research, she is the author of numerous papers and scholarly articles. In 2010 she published the book Maníacos de Qualidade ("Maniacs of Quality"), a biographical and psychological analysis of historical figures in Portugal.

She attended the pharmacy program at the University of Coimbra as a freshwoman, however, she would graduate in psychology at the same university. She has a brother, Henrique, and a sister, Leonor. She is also half-sister of Carlota, from her father second marriage. Joana Amaral Dias is mother of a boy, Vicente, born in 1997 and girl, Luz born in 2016. Amaral Dias also formally adopted a boy in September 2019, though not many details have been released about the child.

== Political career ==
She was one of the highest ranked party members of the Bloco de Esquerda (Left Bloc), although elected for member of the Portuguese Parliament as an independent (2002–2005). In the Portuguese presidential election, 2006 she was a supporter of Mário Soares with a mandate for the youth.

She is a columnist and political analyst. Joana Amaral Dias collaborated with the Diário de Notícias, TSF, SIC, and SIC Notícias. She authored the political column on RTP N and wrote in the newspaper Correio da Manhã and the blog Frontal Cortex.

Her candidature for the 2026 election was rejected, however, by “Tribunal Consitucional”.

== Controversies ==
Joana is one of the standard bearers of the COVID vaccine skepticism in Portugal. She has propagated a narrative contrary to the medical and scientific consensus in her social media platforms, as well as on her regular TV appearances.

Her position is based on the premise that most of the specialists are regularly lying, as it has been alleged that many of them received, directly or indirectly, payments from big pharmaceutical companies, or exaggerate results, in order to advance their agenda.

Being one of the main covid vaccine critics, she has made several false or decontextualized statements. She has asserted that the COVID-19 vaccine does not reduce contagion. She has stated that for people under 50 years old the vaccine is more dangerous than COVID-19.

The same logic is applied to her skepticism of climate change.

In reaction to the record breaking heat wave in London, Joana wrote in Novo Semanário that in June 1885 and July 1886 temperatures had been higher at 162 °F and 155 °F respectively. It is unclear where she obtained those numbers, as they would be higher than any atmospheric temperature ever recorded.
