= Democratic Alliance (Portugal, 2024) =

Portuguese political alliance

AD – PSD/CDS Coalition AD – Coligação PSD/CDS
- Abbreviation: PPD/PSD.CDS–PP (Note: On ballot papers.); AD (Note: Common use abbreviation.) Previous: PPD/PSD.CDS–PP.PPM (2024–2025)
- Leader: Luís Montenegro
- Founder: Luís Montenegro; Nuno Melo; Gonçalo da Câmara Pereira
- Founded: 7 January 2024; 2 years ago
- Membership: PSD; CDS–PP; MPT (since 2025) Former: PPM (2024–2025)
- Ideology: Liberal conservatism; Christian democracy; Conservatism
- Political position: Centre-right to right-wing
- European affiliation: European People's Party Former: European Christian Political Movement (2024–2025)
- Colours: Blue; Orange

Election symbol
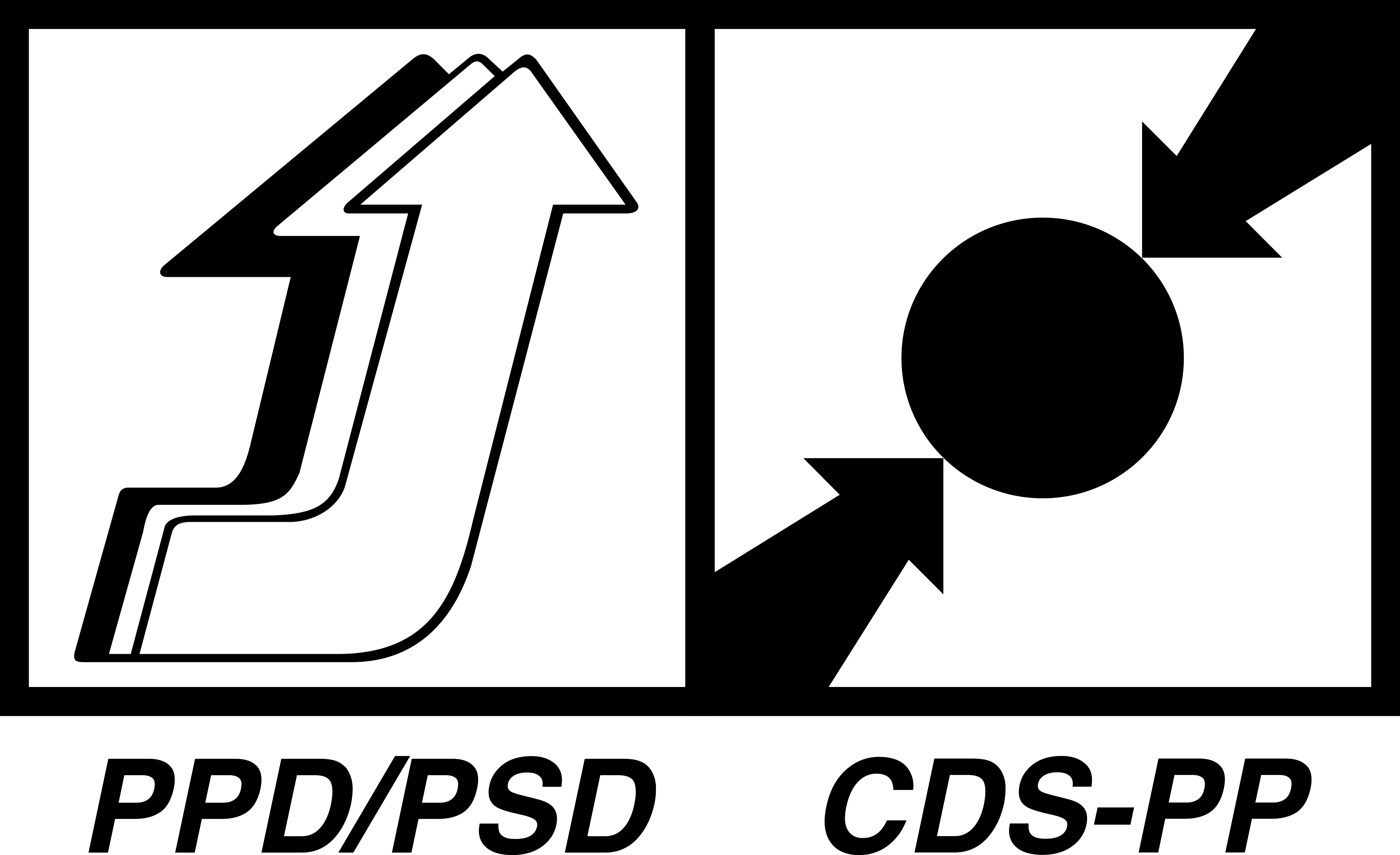
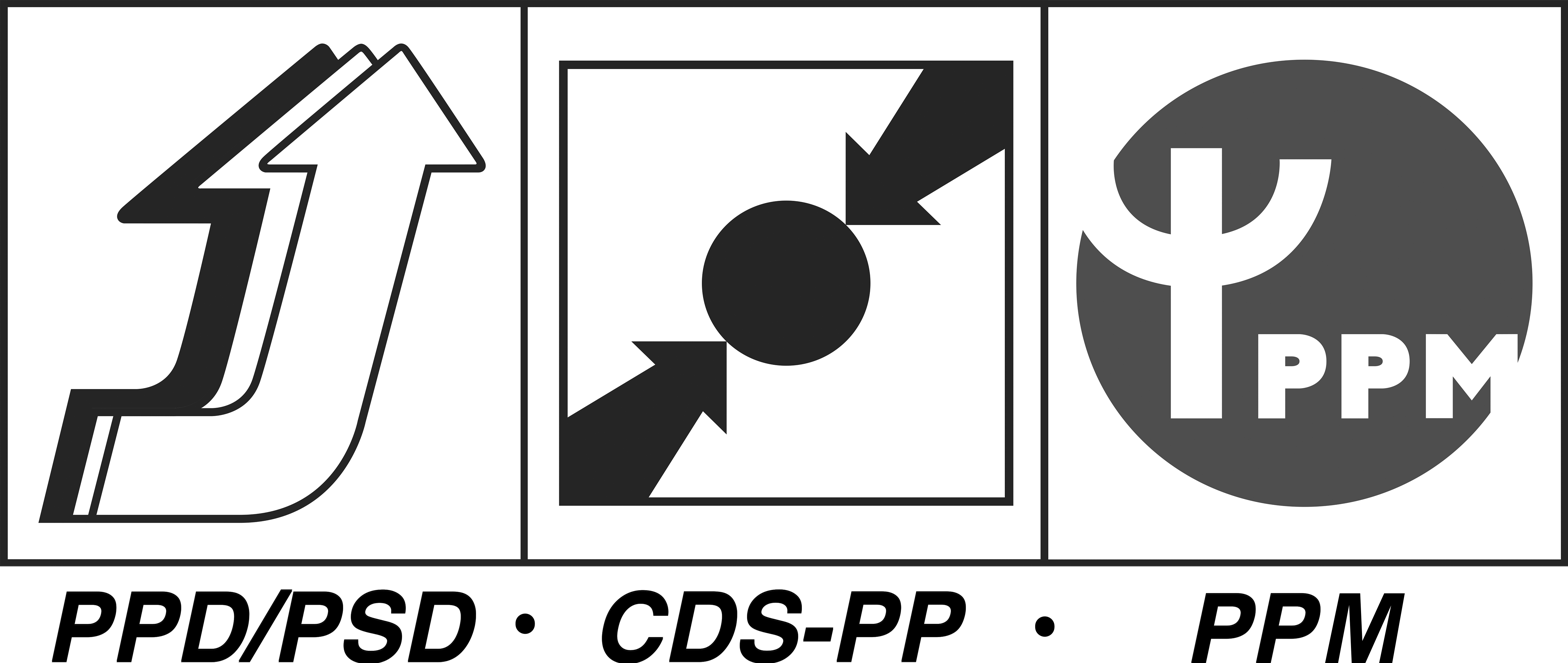
- Previous

Party flag
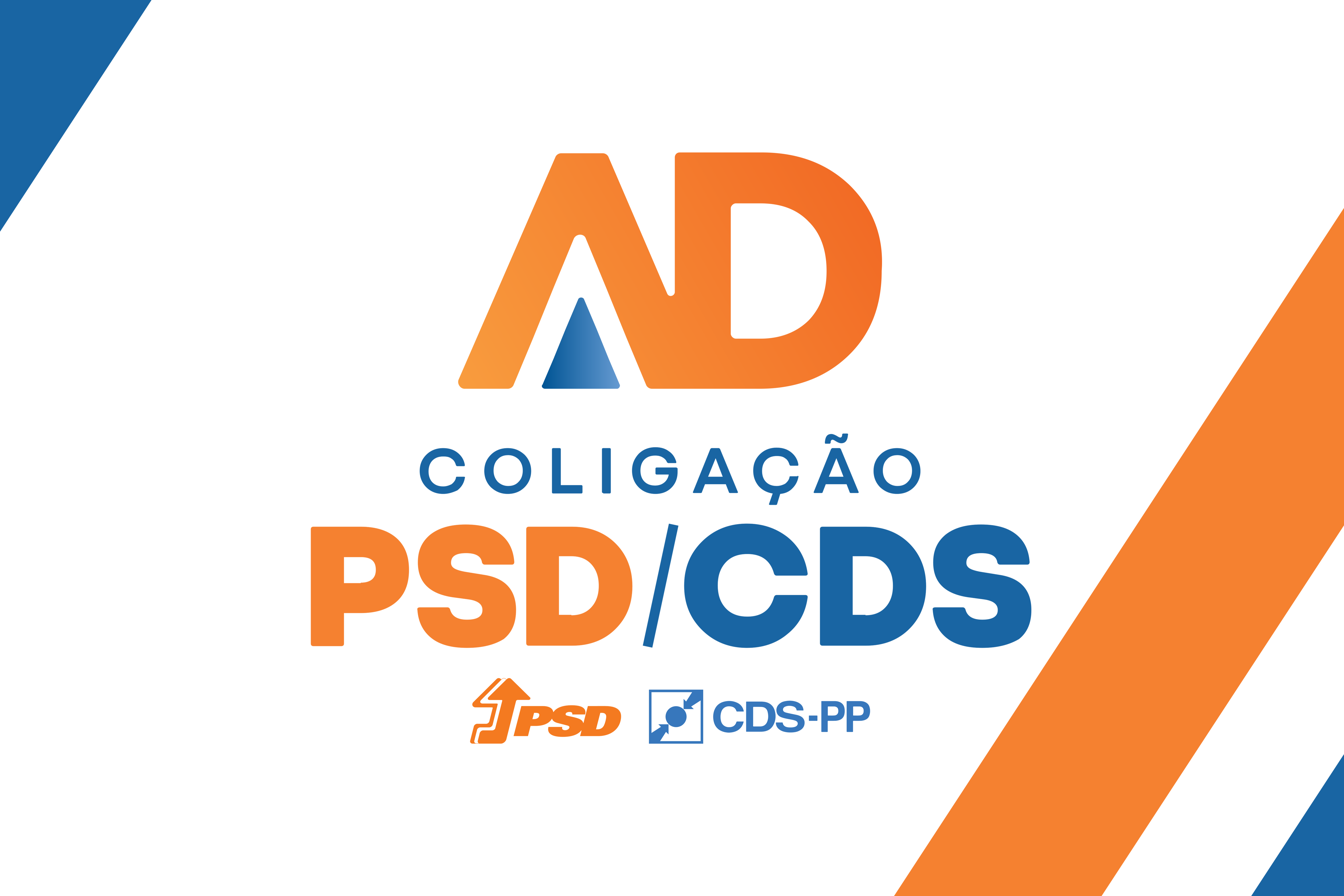

Website
- ad2025.pt

The AD – PSD/CDS Coalition (Portuguese: AD – Coligação PSD/CDS, AD) is a centre-right political alliance in Portugal. Composed of the Social Democratic Party (PSD) and the CDS – People's Party (CDS–PP), the alliance is a relaunch of the homonymous alliance which contested elections between 1979 and 1983. Between 2024 and 2025, it was called AD – Democratic Alliance and also included the People's Monarchist Party (PPM).

== History ==
=== First attempts ===
Marcelo Rebelo de Sousa led a failed attempt to establish a new Democratic Alliance in 1998 (under the name Democratic Alternative) between the PSD and the People's Party (CDS–PP), led by Paulo Portas. A PSD/CDS–PP coalition, called Força Portugal, contested the 2004 European elections, but was defeated and was subsequently dissolved. Ten years later, however, both the PSD and CDS–PP again agreed to contest the 2014 European elections under a joint list called the Portugal Alliance.

In the 2015 legislative election, PSD and CDS-PP ran together in a coalition called Portugal Ahead.

The Democratic Alliance was revived in the Azores only to contest the 2022 elections. The coalition polled second with 34% of the votes and elected two MPs to Parliament.

=== 2024 Democratic Alliance ===
After the 2022 legislative election and for the first time in history, CDS–PP failed to win any seats and was wiped out of parliament. In December 2023, Luís Montenegro and Nuno Melo announced a coalition for the 2024 legislative and European Parliament elections, including the Social Democratic Party (PPD/PSD), the CDS – People's Party (CDS–PP) and some independent politicians under the name Democratic Alliance (AD). At first, the People's Monarchist Party (PPM) refused to join the alliance, citing the "weakness" and "lack of vision" of its leaders, but they later rescinded this position and joined the coalition. The agreement for the coalition was signed on 7 January 2024 between Luís Montenegro, Nuno Melo and Gonçalo da Câmara Pereira, with Miguel Guimarães, former President of the Order of Physicians, representing the independents that are also present in the coalition.

This coalition granted CDS–PP two easily eligible seats and four potentially eligible seats, thus making the return of CDS-PP to the Parliament after the 2024 election certain. The coalition also granted one possibly eligible seat to PPM. The coalition was also revived for the 2024 Azorean regional election.

The coalition won the 2024 Azorean regional election, with 42 percent of the votes. It was the first time in 32 years that a PSD-led coalition polled first in an Azorean regional election. The AD coalition went also to win, albeit by a narrow margin, the 2024 March legislative election, gathering 29 percent of the votes and electing 80 seats to Parliament. PSD leader Luís Montenegro was sworn in as Prime Minister, under a minority government, on 2 April 2024. The Democratic Alliance increased its share of vote in the June 2024 European Parliament election, up to 31 percent, but was narrowly defeated by the Socialist Party (PS) which gathered 32 percent of the votes.

A new election was called for May 2025, after a vote of confidence in the AD minority government was rejected, following the revelations of the Spinumviva case, involving Luís Montenegro's family business. The coalition was again the winner, with a stronger mandate, gathering nearly 32 percent of the votes and 91 seats.

==== Departure of PPM from the coalition ====
On 26 March 2025, it was announced that the People's Monarchist Party (PPM) left the coalition because of disagreements regarding the lists for the May early election. PPM warned PSD and CDS–PP that the name of the coalition couldn't continue the same, and then a new designation was announced: AD – Democratic Alliance – PSD/CDS. The Constitutional Court rejected this new designation and the coalition proposed a new one, AD – PSD/CDS coalition, which was then accepted by the Court. The AD – PSD/CDS coalition also signed a deal with the Earth Party (MPT), in which the party agrees to support the coalition and includes some environmental policies in the AD's electoral program, with MPT leader Pedro Soares Pimenta being a candidate on the 25th place of the list in Lisbon.

== Members of the Democratic Alliance ==
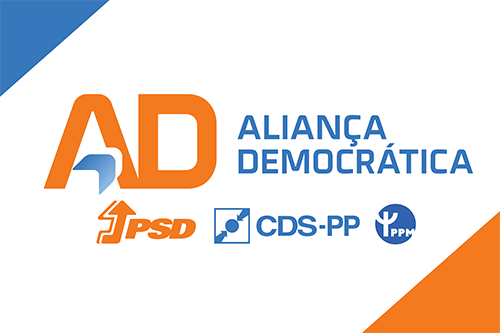
Logo and flag of the Democratic Alliance (2024–2025)
- Social Democratic Party (PPD/PSD)
- CDS – People's Party (CDS–PP)
- Earth Party (MPT) (2025-present)

=== Former members ===
- People's Monarchist Party (PPM) (2024–2025)

== Leaders ==
- Luís Montenegro : 2024–present

== Election results ==
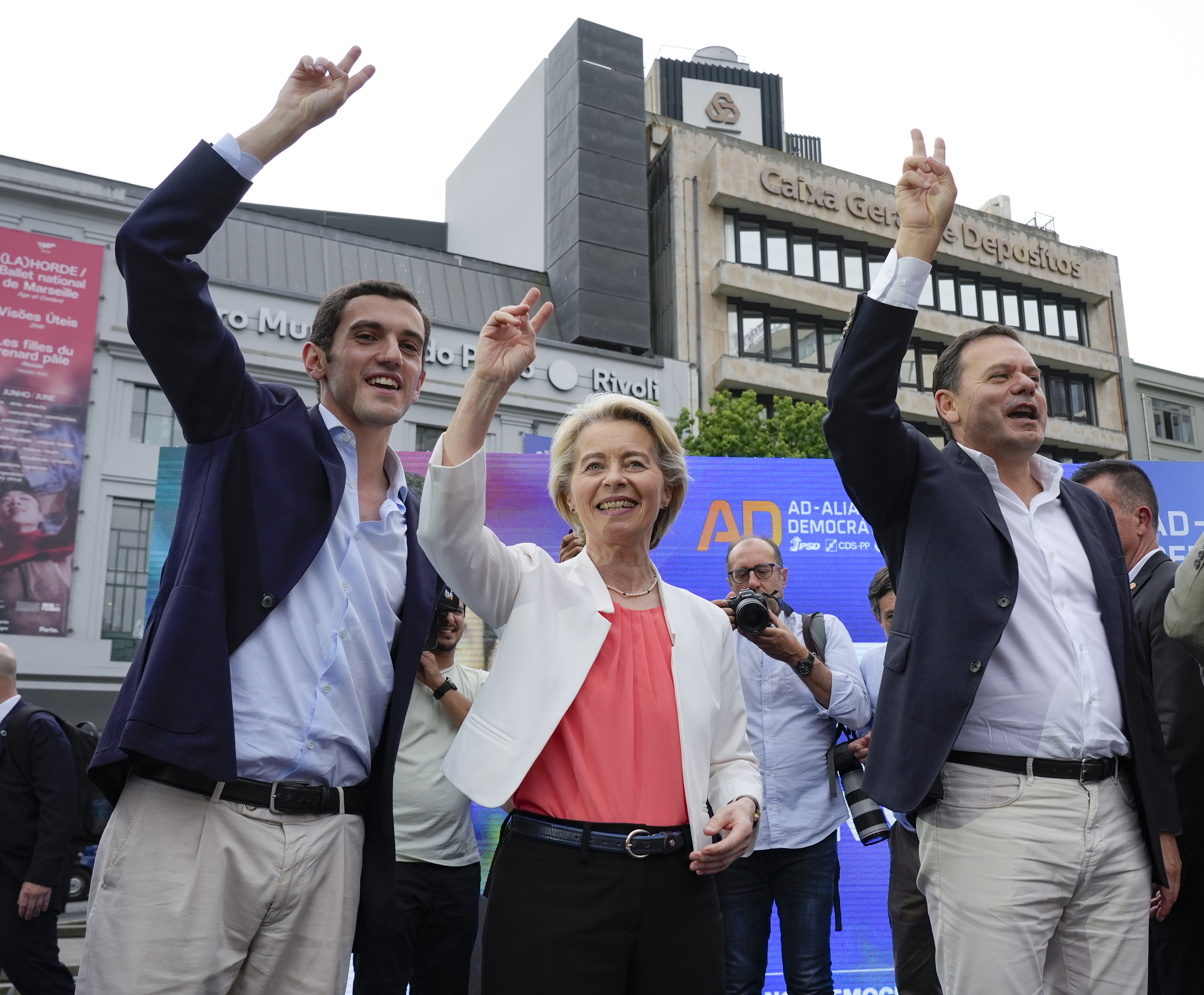
Luís Montenegro, Ursula von der Leyen and Sebastião Bugalho in a Democratic Alliance rally in Porto for the 2024 European Parliament election

=== Assembly of the Republic ===
Election	Leader	Votes	%	Seats	+/-	Government
2024	Luís Montenegro	1,867,442	28.8 (#1)	80 / 230		Coalition (Note: Minority Coalition government (PSD–CDS–PP).)
2025	Luís Montenegro	2,008,488	31.8 (#1)	91 / 230	▲11	Coalition

=== European Parliament ===
Election	Leader	Votes	%	Seats	EP Group
2024	Sebastião Bugalho	1,229,895	31.1 (#2)	7 / 21	EPP

=== Presidential ===
Election	Candidate	First round		Second round		Result
Election	Candidate	Votes	%	Votes	%	Result
2026	Luís Marques Mendes	637,535	11.3 (#5)			Lost ✗

=== Regional Assemblies ===
==== Azores ====
Election	Leader	Votes	%	Seats	Government
2024	José Manuel Bolieiro	48,672	42.1 (#1)	26 / 57	Coalition (Note: Minority Coalition government (PSD–CDS–PP–PPM).)

== See also ==
- Democratic Alliance (Portugal); the coalition of the same name and composition from 1979–1983.
- Coalition PSD/CDS
