= Castelo Branco (Assembly of the Republic constituency) =

Constituency of the Assembly of the Republic, the national legislature of Portugal

- Constituency for the Assembly of the Republic
- Location of Castelo Branco within Portugal
- District: Castelo Branco
- Population: 180,889 (2024)
- Electorate: 162,574 (2025)
- Area: 6,627 km^{2} (2024)

Current Constituency
- Created: 1976
- Seats: List: 4 (2009–present); 5 (1991–2009); 6 (1979–1991); 7 (1976–1979)
- Deputies: List: Ricardo Aires (PSD); Leonor Cipriano (PSD); Nuno Fazenda (PS); João Ribeiro (CH)

Castelo Branco is one of the 22 multi-member constituencies of the Assembly of the Republic, the national legislature of Portugal. The constituency was established in 1976 when the Assembly of the Republic was established by the constitution following the restoration of democracy. It is conterminous with the district of Castelo Branco. The constituency currently elects four of the 230 members of the Assembly of the Republic using the closed party-list proportional representation electoral system. At the 2025 legislative election it had 162,574 registered electors.

== Electoral system ==
Castelo Branco currently elects four of the 230 members of the Assembly of the Republic using the closed party-list proportional representation electoral system. Seats are allocated using the D'Hondt method.

== Election results ==
=== Summary ===
Election	Unitary Democrats CDU / APU / PCP			Left Bloc BE / UDP			LIVRE L			Socialists PS / FRS			People Animals Nature PAN			Democratic Renewal PRD			Social Democrats PSD / PàF / AD / PPD			Liberals IL			CDS – People's CDS–PP / CDS			Chega CH / PPV/CDC / PPV		
Election	Votes	%	Seats	Votes	%	Seats	Votes	%	Seats	Votes	%	Seats	Votes	%	Seats	Votes	%	Seats	Votes	%	Seats	Votes	%	Seats	Votes	%	Seats	Votes	%	Seats
2025	2,228	2.20%	0	1,716	1.69%	0	2,652	2.62%	0	29,764	29.39%	1	946	0.93%	0				33,625	33.20%	2	3,146	3.11%	0				24,322	24.02%	1
2024	2,373	2.25%	0	4,450	4.23%	0	2,172	2.06%	0	37,067	35.21%	2	1,427	1.36%	0				30,812	29.27%	1	2,961	2.81%	0				21,141	20.08%	1
2022	2,784	2.98%	0	4,069	4.35%	0	775	0.83%	0	45,634	48.81%	3	935	1.00%	0				26,240	28.07%	1	2,444	2.61%	0	1,502	1.61%	0	7,959	8.51%	0
2019	4,451	4.99%	0	10,353	11.60%	0	834	0.93%	0	38,313	42.94%	3	2,231	2.50%	0				24,676	27.65%	1	543	0.61%	0	3,480	3.90%	0	1,187	1.33%	0
2015	6,286	6.29%	0	10,450	10.45%	0	507	0.51%	0	40,502	40.52%	2	860	0.86%	0				36,803	36.82%	2									
2011	5,384	5.12%	0	4,609	4.38%	0				38,317	36.41%	2	770	0.73%	0				41,754	39.68%	2				10,571	10.05%	0	219	0.21%	0
2009	5,937	5.25%	0	10,632	9.40%	0				48,105	42.54%	2							34,925	30.88%	2				9,843	8.70%	0	250	0.22%	0
2005	4,678	3.86%	0	4,660	3.85%	0				69,795	57.63%	4							33,240	27.44%	1				6,590	5.44%	0			
2002	3,915	3.34%	0	1,798	1.53%	0				55,140	46.98%	3							45,771	39.00%	2				8,491	7.24%	0			
1999	6,444	5.37%	0	1,522	1.27%	0				63,309	52.77%	3							39,176	32.66%	2				7,660	6.38%	0			
1995	4,771	3.56%	0	792	0.59%	0				72,760	54.32%	3							43,962	32.82%	2				9,863	7.36%	0			
1991	6,150	4.66%	0							43,777	33.16%	2				1,250	0.95%	0	69,867	52.92%	3				5,269	3.99%	0			
1987	9,752	7.34%	0	978	0.74%	0				30,784	23.18%	2				8,177	6.16%	0	71,610	53.93%	4				6,396	4.82%	0			
1985	12,575	9.26%	0	1,457	1.07%	0				26,073	19.21%	1				34,383	25.33%	2	43,874	32.32%	3				13,555	9.99%	0			
1983	15,616	11.70%	0	873	0.65%	0				51,483	38.57%	3							42,461	31.81%	2				18,264	13.68%	1			
1980	15,946	10.83%	0	1,115	0.76%	0				46,182	31.37%	2							77,675	52.76%	4									
1979	19,071	12.89%	0	2,887	1.95%	0				42,659	28.82%	2							76,658	51.80%	4									
1976	9,369	7.16%	0	1,520	1.16%	0				51,822	39.61%	3							32,212	24.62%	2				28,257	21.60%	2			

(Figures in italics represent alliances.)

=== Detailed ===
==== 2020s ====
===== 2025 =====
Results of the 2025 legislative election held on 18 May 2025:

Party		Votes	%	Seats
Democratic Alliance	AD	33,625	33.20%	2
Socialist Party	PS	29,764	29.39%	1
Chega	CH	24,322	24.02%	1
Liberal Initiative	IL	3,146	3.11%	0
LIVRE	L	2,652	2.62%	0
Unitary Democratic Coalition	CDU	2,228	2.20%	0
National Democratic Alternative	ADN	1,874	1.85%	0
Left Bloc	BE	1,716	1.69%	0
People Animals Nature	PAN	946	0.93%	0
Portuguese Workers' Communist Party	PCTP	301	0.30%	0
React, Include, Recycle	RIR	199	0.20%	0
Volt Portugal	Volt	198	0.20%	0
People's Monarchist Party	PPM	154	0.15%	0
Ergue-te	E	145	0.14%	0
Valid votes		101,270	100.00%	4
Blank votes		1,494	1.44%	
Rejected votes – other		1,312	1.26%	
Total polled		104,076	64.02%	
Registered electors		162,574		

The following candidates were elected:: Ricardo Aires (AD); Nuno Fazenda (PS); Pedro Reis (AD); and João Ribeiro (CH).

===== 2024 =====
Results of the 2024 legislative election held on 10 March 2024:

Party		Votes	%	Seats
Socialist Party	PS	37,067	35.21%	2
Democratic Alliance	AD	30,812	29.27%	1
Chega	CH	21,141	20.08%	1
Left Bloc	BE	4,450	4.23%	0
Liberal Initiative	IL	2,961	2.81%	0
Unitary Democratic Coalition	CDU	2,373	2.25%	0
LIVRE	L	2,172	2.06%	0
National Democratic Alternative	ADN	1,492	1.42%	0
People Animals Nature	PAN	1,427	1.36%	0
Portuguese Workers' Communist Party	PCTP	437	0.42%	0
React, Include, Recycle	RIR	367	0.35%	0
New Right	ND	316	0.30%	0
Volt Portugal	Volt	168	0.16%	0
Ergue-te	E	100	0.09%	0
Valid votes		105,283	100.00%	4
Blank votes		1,530	1.41%	
Rejected votes – other		1,447	1.34%	
Total polled		108,260	66.18%	
Registered electors		163,578		

The following candidates were elected: Patrícia Caixinha (PS); Nuno Fazenda (PS); Liliana Reis (AD); and João Ribeiro (CH).

===== 2022 =====
Results of the 2022 legislative election held on 30 January 2022:

Party		Votes	%	Seats
Socialist Party	PS	45,634	48.81%	3
Social Democratic Party	PSD	26,240	28.07%	1
Chega	CH	7,959	8.51%	0
Left Bloc	BE	4,069	4.35%	0
Unitary Democratic Coalition	CDU	2,784	2.98%	0
Liberal Initiative	IL	2,444	2.61%	0
CDS – People's Party	CDS–PP	1,502	1.61%	0
People Animals Nature	PAN	935	1.00%	0
LIVRE	L	775	0.83%	0
Portuguese Workers' Communist Party	PCTP	313	0.33%	0
React, Include, Recycle	RIR	239	0.26%	0
National Democratic Alternative	ADN	176	0.19%	0
Earth Party	PT	154	0.16%	0
Socialist Alternative Movement	MAS	91	0.10%	0
We, the Citizens!	NC	78	0.08%	0
Ergue-te	E	59	0.06%	0
Portuguese Labour Party	PTP	43	0.05%	0
Valid votes		93,495	100.00%	4
Blank votes		1,117	1.17%	
Rejected votes – other		1,126	1.18%	
Total polled		95,738	57.58%	
Registered electors		166,269		

The following candidates were elected: Cláudia André (PSD); Ana Abrunhosa (PS); João Paulo Catarino (PS); and Nuno Fazenda (PS).

==== 2010s ====
===== 2019 =====
Results of the 2019 legislative election held on 6 October 2019:

Party		Votes	%	Seats
Socialist Party	PS	38,313	42.94%	3
Social Democratic Party	PSD	24,676	27.65%	1
Left Bloc	BE	10,353	11.60%	0
Unitary Democratic Coalition	CDU	4,451	4.99%	0
CDS – People's Party	CDS–PP	3,480	3.90%	0
People Animals Nature	PAN	2,231	2.50%	0
Chega	CH	1,187	1.33%	0
LIVRE	L	834	0.93%	0
Alliance	A	715	0.80%	0
Portuguese Workers' Communist Party	PCTP	694	0.78%	0
Liberal Initiative	IL	543	0.61%	0
React, Include, Recycle	RIR	541	0.61%	0
United Party of Retirees and Pensioners	PURP	273	0.31%	0
National Renewal Party	PNR	247	0.28%	0
Earth Party	PT	226	0.25%	0
People's Monarchist Party	PPM	183	0.21%	0
Portuguese Labour Party	PTP	157	0.18%	0
Democratic Republican Party	PDR	125	0.14%	0
Valid votes		89,229	100.00%	4
Blank votes		2,250	2.40%	
Rejected votes – other		2,216	2.37%	
Total polled		93,695	55.09%	
Registered electors		170,075		

The following candidates were elected: Cláudia André (PSD); Eurico Brilhante Dias (PS); Hortense Martins (PS); and Nuno Fazenda (PS).

===== 2015 =====
Results of the 2015 legislative election held on 4 October 2015:

Party		Votes	%	Seats
Socialist Party	PS	40,502	40.52%	2
Portugal Ahead	PàF	36,803	36.82%	2
Left Bloc	BE	10,450	10.45%	0
Unitary Democratic Coalition	CDU	6,286	6.29%	0
Democratic Republican Party	PDR	1,086	1.09%	0
Portuguese Workers' Communist Party	PCTP	1,080	1.08%	0
People Animals Nature	PAN	860	0.86%	0
National Renewal Party	PNR	508	0.51%	0
LIVRE	L	507	0.51%	0
People's Monarchist Party	PPM	496	0.50%	0
The Earth Party Movement	MPT	464	0.46%	0
ACT! (Portuguese Labour Party and Socialist Alternative Movement)	AGIR	374	0.37%	0
United Party of Retirees and Pensioners	PURP	272	0.27%	0
We, the Citizens!	NC	267	0.27%	0
Valid votes		99,955	100.00%	4
Blank votes		2,091	2.01%	
Rejected votes – other		2,166	2.08%	
Total polled		104,212	57.58%	
Registered electors		180,996		

The following candidates were elected: Álvaro Batista (PàF); Eurico Brilhante Dias (PS); Manuel Frexes (PàF); and Hortense Martins (PS).

===== 2011 =====
Results of the 2011 legislative election held on 5 June 2011:

Party		Votes	%	Seats
Social Democratic Party	PSD	41,754	39.68%	2
Socialist Party	PS	38,317	36.41%	2
CDS – People's Party	CDS–PP	10,571	10.05%	0
Unitary Democratic Coalition	CDU	5,384	5.12%	0
Left Bloc	BE	4,609	4.38%	0
Portuguese Workers' Communist Party	PCTP	1,454	1.38%	0
Party for Animals and Nature	PAN	770	0.73%	0
Portuguese Labour Party	PTP	543	0.52%	0
National Renewal Party	PNR	428	0.41%	0
People's Monarchist Party	PPM	425	0.40%	0
The Earth Party Movement	MPT	403	0.38%	0
Hope for Portugal Movement	MEP	355	0.34%	0
Pro-Life Party	PPV	219	0.21%	0
Valid votes		105,232	100.00%	4
Blank votes		2,943	2.67%	
Rejected votes – other		1,928	1.75%	
Total polled		110,103	57.76%	
Registered electors		190,614		

The following candidates were elected: Carlos Costa Neves (PSD); Carlos São Martinho (PSD); Fernando Serrasqueiro (PS); and José Sócrates (PS).

==== 2000s ====
===== 2009 =====
Results of the 2009 legislative election held on 27 September 2009:

Party		Votes	%	Seats
Socialist Party	PS	48,105	42.54%	2
Social Democratic Party	PSD	34,925	30.88%	2
Left Bloc	BE	10,632	9.40%	0
CDS – People's Party	CDS–PP	9,843	8.70%	0
Unitary Democratic Coalition	CDU	5,937	5.25%	0
Portuguese Workers' Communist Party	PCTP	1,130	1.00%	0
Merit and Society Movement	MMS	508	0.45%	0
Portuguese Labour Party	PTP	402	0.36%	0
People's Monarchist Party	PPM	394	0.35%	0
The Earth Party Movement and Humanist Party	MPT-PH	352	0.31%	0
Hope for Portugal Movement	MEP	348	0.31%	0
National Renewal Party	PNR	263	0.23%	0
Pro-Life Party	PPV	250	0.22%	0
Valid votes		113,089	100.00%	4
Blank votes		1,993	1.70%	
Rejected votes – other		2,297	1.96%	
Total polled		117,379	60.57%	
Registered electors		193,786		

The following candidates were elected: Carlos Costa Neves (PSD); Carlos São Martinho (PSD); Fernando Serrasqueiro (PS); and José Sócrates (PS).

===== 2005 =====
Results of the 2005 legislative election held on 20 February 2005:

Party		Votes	%	Seats
Socialist Party	PS	69,795	57.63%	4
Social Democratic Party	PSD	33,240	27.44%	1
CDS – People's Party	CDS–PP	6,590	5.44%	0
Unitary Democratic Coalition	CDU	4,678	3.86%	0
Left Bloc	BE	4,660	3.85%	0
Portuguese Workers' Communist Party	PCTP	947	0.78%	0
New Democracy Party	ND	619	0.51%	0
Humanist Party	PH	326	0.27%	0
National Renewal Party	PNR	263	0.22%	0
Valid votes		121,118	100.00%	5
Blank votes		1,764	1.42%	
Rejected votes – other		1,753	1.41%	
Total polled		124,635	65.96%	
Registered electors		188,963		

The following candidates were elected: Cristina Granada (PS); Valter Lemos (PS); Nuno Morais Sarmento (PSD); Fernando Serrasqueiro (PS); and José Sócrates (PS).

===== 2002 =====
Results of the 2002 legislative election held on 17 March 2002:

Party		Votes	%	Seats
Socialist Party	PS	55,140	46.98%	3
Social Democratic Party	PSD	45,771	39.00%	2
CDS – People's Party	CDS–PP	8,491	7.24%	0
Unitary Democratic Coalition	CDU	3,915	3.34%	0
Left Bloc	BE	1,798	1.53%	0
Portuguese Workers' Communist Party	PCTP	818	0.70%	0
People's Monarchist Party	PPM	402	0.34%	0
Humanist Party	PH	394	0.34%	0
The Earth Party Movement	MPT	370	0.32%	0
National Renewal Party	PNR	258	0.22%	0
Valid votes		117,357	100.00%	5
Blank votes		981	0.82%	
Rejected votes – other		1,334	1.11%	
Total polled		119,672	62.65%	
Registered electors		191,027		

The following candidates were elected: Maria Elisa Domingues (PSD); Valter Lemos (PS); Fernando Penha (PSD); Fernando Serrasqueiro (PS); and José Sócrates (PS).

==== 1990s ====
===== 1999 =====
Results of the 1999 legislative election held on 10 October 1999:

Party		Votes	%	Seats
Socialist Party	PS	63,309	52.77%	3
Social Democratic Party	PSD	39,176	32.66%	2
CDS – People's Party	CDS–PP	7,660	6.38%	0
Unitary Democratic Coalition	CDU	6,444	5.37%	0
Left Bloc	BE	1,522	1.27%	0
Portuguese Workers' Communist Party	PCTP	845	0.70%	0
People's Monarchist Party	PPM	589	0.49%	0
The Earth Party Movement	MPT	424	0.35%	0
Valid votes		119,969	100.00%	5
Blank votes		1,044	0.85%	
Rejected votes – other		1,536	1.25%	
Total polled		122,549	63.82%	
Registered electors		192,029		

The following candidates were elected: Manuel Frexes (PSD); António Guterres (PS); Fernando Penha (PSD); Fernando Serrasqueiro (PS); and José Sócrates (PS).

===== 1995 =====
Results of the 1995 legislative election held on 1 October 1995:

Party		Votes	%	Seats
Socialist Party	PS	72,760	54.32%	3
Social Democratic Party	PSD	43,962	32.82%	2
CDS – People's Party	CDS–PP	9,863	7.36%	0
Unitary Democratic Coalition	CDU	4,771	3.56%	0
Popular Democratic Union	UDP	792	0.59%	0
Portuguese Workers' Communist Party	PCTP	669	0.50%	0
Revolutionary Socialist Party	PSR	622	0.46%	0
People's Monarchist Party and The Earth Party Movement	PPM-MPT	501	0.37%	0
Valid votes		133,940	100.00%	5
Blank votes		849	0.62%	
Rejected votes – other		2,050	1.50%	
Total polled		136,839	67.41%	
Registered electors		202,995		

The following candidates were elected: Álvaro Barreto (PSD); António Guterres (PS); Fernando Serrasqueiro (PS); Antunes da Silva (PSD); and José Sócrates (PS).

===== 1991 =====
Results of the 1991 legislative election held on 6 October 1991:

Party		Votes	%	Seats
Social Democratic Party	PSD	69,867	52.92%	3
Socialist Party	PS	43,777	33.16%	2
Unitary Democratic Coalition	CDU	6,150	4.66%	0
Social Democratic Centre Party	CDS	5,269	3.99%	0
National Solidarity Party	PSN	3,121	2.36%	0
Democratic Renewal Party	PRD	1,250	0.95%	0
Portuguese Workers' Communist Party	PCTP	1,008	0.76%	0
Revolutionary Socialist Party	PSR	903	0.68%	0
People's Monarchist Party	PPM	672	0.51%	0
Valid votes		132,017	100.00%	5
Blank votes		1,132	0.84%	
Rejected votes – other		1,836	1.36%	
Total polled		134,985	67.81%	
Registered electors		199,057		

The following candidates were elected: António Guterres (PS); Nunes Liberato (PSD); Carlos Pinto (PSD); Antunes da Silva (PSD); and José Sócrates (PS).

==== 1980s ====
===== 1987 =====
Results of the 1987 legislative election held on 19 July 1987:

Party		Votes	%	Seats
Social Democratic Party	PSD	71,610	53.93%	4
Socialist Party	PS	30,784	23.18%	2
Unitary Democratic Coalition	CDU	9,752	7.34%	0
Democratic Renewal Party	PRD	8,177	6.16%	0
Social Democratic Centre Party	CDS	6,396	4.82%	0
Christian Democratic Party	PDC	1,357	1.02%	0
Communist Party (Reconstructed)	PC(R)	1,127	0.85%	0
Popular Democratic Union	UDP	978	0.74%	0
Revolutionary Socialist Party	PSR	781	0.59%	0
People's Monarchist Party	PPM	753	0.57%	0
Portuguese Workers' Communist Party	PCTP	566	0.43%	0
Portuguese Democratic Movement	MDP	500	0.38%	0
Valid votes		132,781	100.00%	6
Blank votes		1,489	1.08%	
Rejected votes – other		3,101	2.26%	
Total polled		137,371	71.19%	
Registered electors		192,953		

The following candidates were elected: António Guterres (PS); Pereira Lopes (PSD); Carlos Pinto (PSD); Pedro Roseta (PSD); Antunes da Silva (PSD); and José Sócrates (PS).

===== 1985 =====
Results of the 1985 legislative election held on 6 October 1985:

Party		Votes	%	Seats
Social Democratic Party	PSD	43,874	32.32%	3
Democratic Renewal Party	PRD	34,383	25.33%	2
Socialist Party	PS	26,073	19.21%	1
Social Democratic Centre Party	CDS	13,555	9.99%	0
United People Alliance	APU	12,575	9.26%	0
Popular Democratic Union	UDP	1,457	1.07%	0
Christian Democratic Party	PDC	1,300	0.96%	0
Revolutionary Socialist Party	PSR	766	0.56%	0
Communist Party (Reconstructed)	PC(R)	706	0.52%	0
Portuguese Workers' Communist Party	PCTP	638	0.47%	0
Workers' Party of Socialist Unity	POUS	421	0.31%	0
Valid votes		135,748	100.00%	6
Blank votes		1,237	0.88%	
Rejected votes – other		3,718	2.64%	
Total polled		140,703	73.00%	
Registered electors		192,752		

The following candidates were elected: Fernando Carvalho (PRD); Vítor Crespo (PSD); António Guterres (PS); Pereira Lopes (PSD); António Mendes (PRD); and Antunes da Silva (PSD).

===== 1983 =====
Results of the 1983 legislative election held on 25 April 1983:

Party		Votes	%	Seats
Socialist Party	PS	51,483	38.57%	3
Social Democratic Party	PSD	42,461	31.81%	2
Social Democratic Centre Party	CDS	18,264	13.68%	1
United People Alliance	APU	15,616	11.70%	0
Christian Democratic Party	PDC	1,230	0.92%	0
Workers' Party of Socialist Unity	POUS	975	0.73%	0
Popular Democratic Union	UDP	873	0.65%	0
People's Monarchist Party	PPM	770	0.58%	0
Portuguese Workers' Communist Party	PCTP	602	0.45%	0
Revolutionary Socialist Party	PSR	560	0.42%	0
Socialist Workers League	LST	395	0.30%	0
Portuguese Marxist–Leninist Communist Organization	OCMLP	239	0.18%	0
Valid votes		133,468	100.00%	6
Blank votes		1,263	0.91%	
Rejected votes – other		4,034	2.91%	
Total polled		138,765	73.47%	
Registered electors		188,876		

The following candidates were elected: Fernando Fradinho (PS); César Vila Franca (PSD); João Lencastre (CDS); José Roque Lino (PS); José Martins Pires (PS); and Antunes da Silva (PSD).

===== 1980 =====
Results of the 1980 legislative election held on 5 October 1980:

Party		Votes	%	Seats
Democratic Alliance	AD	77,675	52.76%	4
Republican and Socialist Front	FRS	46,182	31.37%	2
United People Alliance	APU	15,946	10.83%	0
Workers' Party of Socialist Unity	POUS	2,457	1.67%	0
Portuguese Workers' Communist Party	PCTP	1,270	0.86%	0
Popular Democratic Union	UDP	1,115	0.76%	0
Labour Party	PT	1,014	0.69%	0
Revolutionary Socialist Party	PSR	956	0.65%	0
Christian Democratic Party, Independent Movement for the National Reconstruction / Party of the Portuguese Right and National Front	PDC- MIRN/ PDP- FN	609	0.41%	0
Valid votes		147,224	100.00%	6
Blank votes		926	0.61%	
Rejected votes – other		4,134	2.71%	
Total polled		152,284	84.17%	
Registered electors		180,917		

The following candidates were elected: António Guterres (FRS); Mário Lopes (AD); Carlos Robalo (AD); Pedro Roseta (AD); Luis Veloso Sampaio (AD); and Alfredo Pinto Silva (FRS).

==== 1970s ====
===== 1979 =====
Results of the 1979 legislative election held on 2 December 1979:

Party		Votes	%	Seats
Democratic Alliance	AD	76,658	51.80%	4
Socialist Party	PS	42,659	28.82%	2
United People Alliance	APU	19,071	12.89%	0
Popular Democratic Union	UDP	2,887	1.95%	0
Christian Democratic Party	PDC	2,327	1.57%	0
Portuguese Workers' Communist Party	PCTP	1,683	1.14%	0
Left-wing Union for the Socialist Democracy	UEDS	1,469	0.99%	0
Revolutionary Socialist Party	PSR	1,245	0.84%	0
Valid votes		147,999	100.00%	6
Blank votes		1,246	0.81%	
Rejected votes – other		4,397	2.86%	
Total polled		153,642	86.07%	
Registered electors		178,513		

The following candidates were elected: António Guterres (PS); Mário Lopes (AD); Albano Pina (PS); Carlos Robalo (AD); Pedro Roseta (AD); and Luis Veloso Sampaio (AD).

===== 1976 =====
Results of the 1976 legislative election held on 25 April 1976:

Party		Votes	%	Seats
Socialist Party	PS	51,822	39.61%	3
Democratic People's Party	PPD	32,212	24.62%	2
Social Democratic Centre Party	CDS	28,257	21.60%	2
Portuguese Communist Party	PCP	9,369	7.16%	0
People's Socialist Front	FSP	1,708	1.31%	0
Popular Democratic Union	UDP	1,520	1.16%	0
Re-Organized Movement of the Party of the Proletariat	MRPP	1,325	1.01%	0
Christian Democratic Party	PDC	1,163	0.89%	0
People's Monarchist Party	PPM	959	0.73%	0
Movement of Socialist Left	MES	844	0.65%	0
Communist Party of Portugal (Marxist–Leninist)	PCP(ML)	586	0.45%	0
Worker–Peasant Alliance	AOC	577	0.44%	0
Internationalist Communist League	LCI	481	0.37%	0
Valid votes		130,823	100.00%	7
Rejected votes		11,443	8.04%	
Total polled		142,266	80.76%	
Registered electors		176,159		

The following candidates were elected: José Sérvulo Correia (PPD); João Malhó Fonseca (CDS); António Guterres (PS); Albano Pina (PS); Pedro Roseta (PPD); Alfredo Pinto Silva (PS); and Francisco Farromba Vilela (CDS).
