= New Social Order (Portugal) =

Political organization and political party in Portugal

New Social Order Nova Ordem Social
- Leader: Mário Machado
- Founded: April 26, 2014
- Dissolved: November 2019
- Split from: National Renovator Party
- Ideology: Portuguese nationalism Ultranationalism; Anti-immigration; White nationalism Neo-Nazism; Neo-Salazarism; Lusitanian Integralism
- Political position: Far-right
- European affiliation: None

Party flag

Website
- http://nova-ordem-social.blogspot.com/

The New Social Order (Portuguese: Nova Ordem Social, NOS), was a far-right political movement in Portugal. Founded by Mário Machado in 2014 after he distanced himself from the National Renovator Party due to the party's opposition to the more extremist elements of the movement, Machado had also previously been a member of the Portuguese Hammerskins.

== History ==
In February 2019 the movement organised a march through the streets of Lisbon to commemorate former prime minister António de Oliveira Salazar, whose rule has been described as authoritarian and nationalist. The march numbered around fifty and lasted around an hour.

On August 10, 2019 the New Social Order organised an event which it called the "largest nationalist event in Portugal". Sixty-five attendees were present with delegations from numerous far-right parties across Europe, the event was held at a hotel in Lisbon. In response to the event hundreds of demonstrators protested outside the hotel and prime minister Antonio Costa was criticised for allowing the event to take place without intervention on behest of the government.
