= Romani people in Brazil =

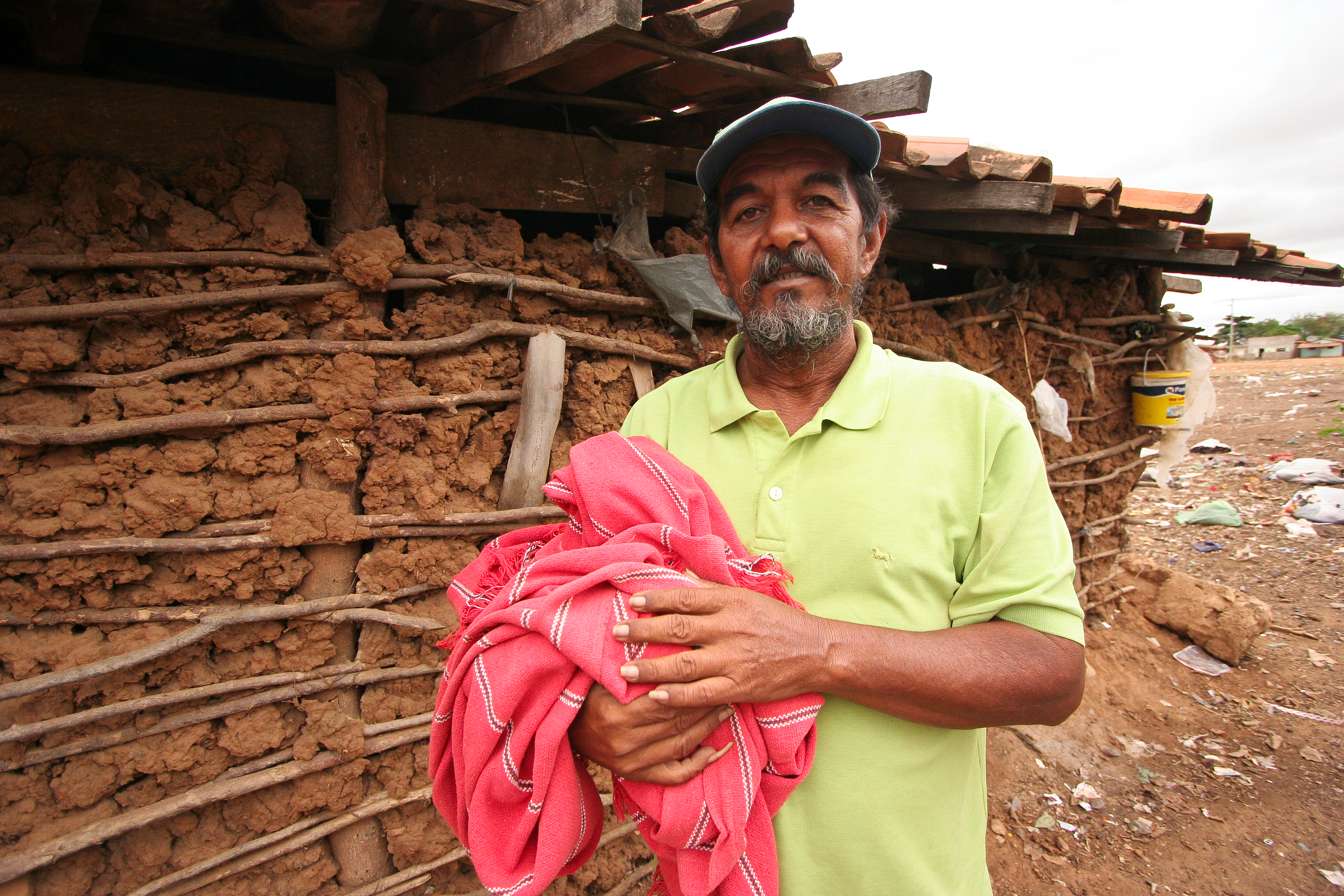
- Cigano man in Sousa, Paraíba

Total population
- ≈ 800,000

Related ethnic groups
- Gitanos, Ciganos

The Romani people in Brazil (Portuguese: Ciganos no Brasil) are known by non-Romani Brazilians as ciganos (Portuguese: [siˈɡɐ̃nus -ˈnuʃ]), or alternatively by terms such as boêmios, judeus (in Minas Gerais) and quicos (in Minas Gerais and São Paulo), in various degrees of accuracy of use and etymology as well as linguistic prestige.

As implied by some of their most common local names, most Brazilian Romani belong to the Iberian Kale group, like their fellow lusophone Portuguese ciganos, and the Spanish Romani people, known as gitanos.

== History ==
A 2012 government report indicates that they arrived in Brazil in the second half of the 16th century, after being expelled from Portugal. They were sentenced to prison in Portugal, requested to be exiled instead, and were ultimately sent to Brazil (some were first sent to Africa). The report also indicates that most Romani men in Brazil today "live from trade and the women engage in palm reading". At one time, they traded horses but now, deal in used cars and other goods.

== Demographics ==
The 2010 census data indicates a population of 800,000 ciganos, or 0.4% of Brazil's population; there are concerns in Brazil about lack of public policy directed at this segment of the population. The Special Secretariat for the Promotion of Racial Equality estimates the number of ciganos in Brazil at 800,000 (2011). Many still speak the Romani language. A 2015 report by the United Nations stated that the Roma (Cigano) community who seemed to be "highly invisible" in Brazil. "They are still largely stereotyped […] as thieves, beggars or fortune tellers."

The 2010 IBGE Brazilian National Census encountered Romani camps in 291 of Brazil's 5,565 municipalities. It is the second largest Romani population in the world, after the United States. The first Brazilian president (1956–1961) of direct non-Portuguese Romani origin was Juscelino Kubitschek, 50% Czech Romani by his mother's bloodline. His term was marked by economic prosperity and political stability, being most known by the construction of Brazil's new capital, Brasília. Nevertheless, Brazil already had a president of Portuguese Kale ancestry before Juscelino's term, Washington Luís who was trained as Lawyer became a career politician, and later focused on historical studies in Brazil.

== Notable Romani Brazilians ==
- Juscelino Kubitschek – 21st President of Brazil
- Washington Luís – 13th President of Brazil
