= José Pinto Coelho =

Portuguese politician

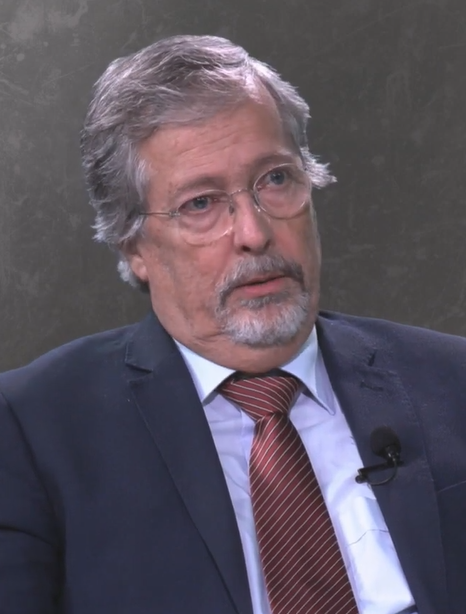
- Coelho in 2024

President of the National Renovator Party
- In office 25 June 2005 – 15 December 2024
- Preceded by: António Cruz Rodrigues
- Succeeded by: Rui Fonseca e Castro

Personal details
- Born: 27 September 1960 (age 66) Lisbon, Portugal
- Party: Rise Up
- Spouse: Ana Mafalda de Aragão Morais de Utra Machado
- Children: 5
- Education: Institute of Visual Arts, Design and Marketing
- Profession: Graphic designer Teacher

José de Almeida e Vasconcelos Pinto Coelho (born 27 September 1960) is a Portuguese far-right and nationalist politician, who was president of the Rise Up (former National Renewal Party) from 2005 to 2024.

== Biography ==
The second son of José Gabriel Braamcamp Freire Pinto Coelho (maternal grandson of the 4th Barons of Almeirim) and first wife Maria Pia Penalva de Almeida e Vasconcelos (grand-niece of the 1st Viscount of Almeida e Vasconcelos, maternal granddaughter of the 2nd Counts of Penalva de Alva and half second cousin of Manuela Ferreira Leite), Pinto-Coelho grew up in Lisbon until the age of 14, but due to the revolutionary period in Portugal, his father, an architect, was forced to look for work abroad, and the family moved to Brazil.

After returning to Portugal he began studying Law at the Catholic University of Portugal in Lisbon, but he quit the university and graduated in Graphic Design from IADE (Institute of Visual Arts, Design and Marketing) in Lisbon.

Since the late 70s he became affiliated with the Nationalist Movement, and collaborated with the magazine Futuro Presente and with the newspaper O Século directed by Jaime Nogueira Pinto. In the 90s he became a member of the National Alliance and in 1999 was one of the founders of the National Renewal Party. On 25 June 2005, at the party's 2nd National Convention, he was elected president.

A graphic designer by profession and a teacher at Colégio Planalto, he is married to Ana Mafalda de Aragão Morais de Utra Machado. Both his wife and mother generally run as candidates on his party's Legislative Elections. He is the father of five children and one of the founders of the Portuguese Association of Large Families.
