= Ergue-te =

Right-wing political party in Portugal

Rise Up Ergue-te
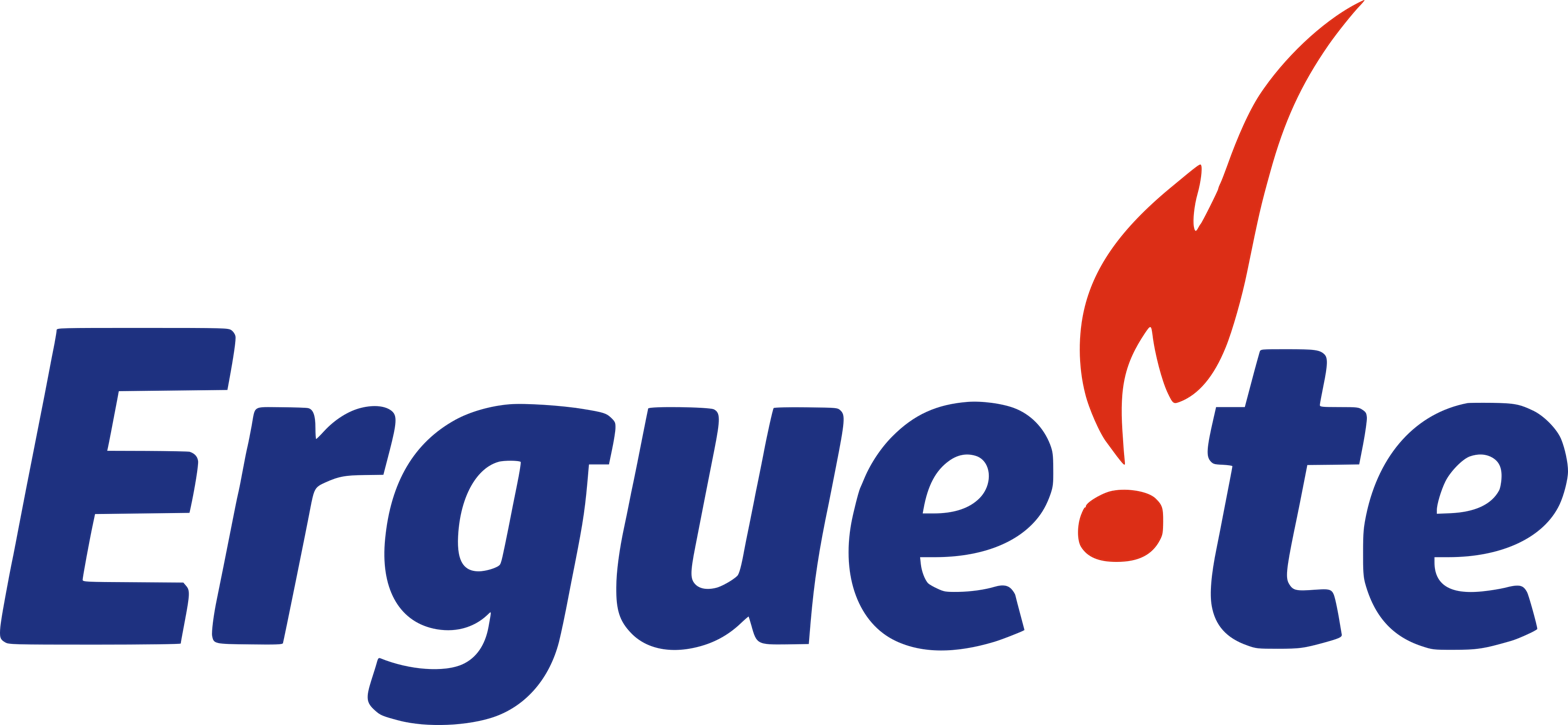
- Abbreviation: E
- President: Rui Fonseca e Castro
- Founded: 12 April 2000
- Dissolved: 12 June 2025
- Merger of: Democratic Renewal Party; National Action Movement
- Headquarters: Lisbon
- Youth wing: Ala dos Namorados
- Ideology: Neo-fascism; Ultranationalism; National conservatism; Social conservatism; Right-wing populism; Nativism; Euroscepticism; Anti-immigration
- Political position: Far-right
- European affiliation: Alliance of European National Movements
- Colours: Black, blue and red

Rise Up (Portuguese: Ergue-te, E), originally the National Renewal Party (Portuguese: Partido Nacional Renovador, PNR) was a Portuguese far-right nationalist political party. Its motto is Nation and Work (Portuguese: Nação e Trabalho) and one of its goals consisted in the appreciation of a Portuguese nationalist spirit.

The party results legally from the alteration of statutes approved in the VII Nacional Convention of the old Democratic Renewal Party (PRD) requested on 17 March 2000 and validated by the Constitutional Court on 12 April 2000. This change implicated in the change of name, acronym and logo. In a report published by the North American NGO GPAHE against hate and extremism, Ergue-te was classified, along with ADN and Chega, as a hate and far-right group.

The party was extinct in June 2025, after not presenting the party's finances to the Constitutional Court in 2019, 2020 and 2021.

== History ==
In the 2005 legislative election, the then PNR obtained just under 0.2% of the vote, failing to elect any deputies to Parliament by a wide margin. In the 2009 European election, the party had about 13,000 votes, having 0.37% of the vote, the party had its higher results in the districts of Lisbon and Setúbal. An increase of just over 50% in comparison to 2011 was seen in 2015, the year the party most increased in votes, having received 27,269 votes in the legislative elections.

On 10 July 2020, wanting to change its public image and undo misconceptions arising from the confusion between the acronyms PNR and PDR —the former Republican Democratic Party (Portuguese: Partido Democrático Republicano), now named National Democratic Alternative—, it changed its name to Ergue-te, with the acronym E, this alteration was accepted and registered by the Constitutional Court following deliberation taken by the National Council of PNR on 23 November 2019.

In December 2024, José Pinto Coelho left the party's leadership, being replaced by Rui Fonseca e Castro, a former judge who was a COVID-19 vaccine conspirationist. The party ended up becoming extinct in June 2025 after not presenting financial documents to the Constitutional Court of 2019, 2020 and 2021.

== Ideology ==
The party has been described as Islamophobic and opposes both Portugal's NATO membership and Europe's Islamization. Its party platform for the 2024 election includes opposition to multiculturalism, restrictions on immigration, changing the nationality law so it's based on Ius sanguinis, opposition to euthanasia and same-sex marriage, and abolishing the right to strike.

== Organization ==
=== Leadership ===
#	Portrait	President	Term start	Term end	Prime minister
1		António Cruz Rodrigues	12 April 2000	25 June 2005	António Guterres (1995–2002)
1		António Cruz Rodrigues	12 April 2000	25 June 2005	José Durão Barroso (2002–2004)
1		António Cruz Rodrigues	12 April 2000	25 June 2005	Pedro Santana Lopes (2004–2005)
1		António Cruz Rodrigues	12 April 2000	25 June 2005	José Sócrates (2005–2011)
2		José Pinto Coelho	25 June 2005	15 December 2024	José Sócrates (2005–2011)
2		José Pinto Coelho	25 June 2005	15 December 2024	Pedro Passos Coelho (2011–2015)
2		José Pinto Coelho	25 June 2005	15 December 2024	António Costa (2015–2024)
2		José Pinto Coelho	25 June 2005	15 December 2024	Luís Montenegro (2024–present)
3		Rui Fonseca e Castro	15 December 2024	12 June 2025	Luís Montenegro (2024–present)

=== Youth wing ===
The "Nationalist Youth" (Juventude Nacionalista) was founded as the PNR's youth wing. Since the beginning of 2006, it has tried recruiting students at secondary schools and in universities. This situation has drawn the authorities' attention, which sent a report to the Ministries of Education and Internal Administration. According to the report, even though the PNR was a legalized party at the time, there was a real risk of transmitting xenophobic ideas to young people, which would allegedly promote violence. The Youth's leader confirmed this recruitment, refuting, however, the transmission of messages with a criminal or violent nature to young people.

After the name change in 2020, the party youth was renamed Ala dos Namorados (translatable as "Boyfriends'/Lovers' Wing"), inspired by the right wing of the Portuguese army in the Battle of Aljubarrota, composed of young unmarried nobles.

== Election results ==
=== Assembly of the Republic ===
Election	Leader	Votes	%	Seats	+/-	Government
2002	António Cruz Rodrigues	4,712	0.1 (#10)	0 / 230		No seats
2005	José Pinto Coelho	9,374	0.2 (#9)	0 / 230	0	No seats
2009	José Pinto Coelho	11,628	0.2 (#12)	0 / 230	0	No seats
2011	José Pinto Coelho	17,742	0.3 (#10)	0 / 230	0	No seats
2015	José Pinto Coelho	27,269	0.5 (#9)	0 / 230	0	No seats
2019	José Pinto Coelho	17,126	0.3 (#13)	0 / 230	0	No seats
2022	José Pinto Coelho	5,236	0.1 (#19)	0 / 230	0	No seats
2024	José Pinto Coelho	6,034	0.1 (#16)	0 / 230	0	No seats
2025	Rui Fonseca e Castro	9,046	0.2 (#15)	0 / 230	0	No seats

=== European Parliament ===
Election	List leader	Votes	%	Seats	+/–	EP Group
2004	Paulo Rodrigues	8,405	0.3 (#11)	0 / 24		–
2009	Humberto Nuno Oliveira	13,214	0.4 (#12)	0 / 22	0	–
2014	Humberto Nuno Oliveira	15,036	0.5 (#12)	0 / 21	0	–
2019	João Patrocínio	16,165	0.5 (#13)	0 / 21	0	–
2024	Rui Fonseca e Castro	8,540	0.2 (#11)	0 / 21	0	–

== Public profile ==
=== Public demonstrations ===
E has been involved in many controversies. In 2006, it got involved in the demonstration by security forces agents against the government. The Diário de Notícias article about the participation of the then PNR reads:

"It was total chaos. It had been almost 120 minutes from the set time for the beginning of the parade by the security force agents against the government policies when the organizers arrived at the Marquis of Pombal Square to warn that, after all, there wasn't going to be a demonstration. With the argument that the PSP, GNR, Maritime Police and Foreigners and Border Services agents refused to "parade next to neonazis" (and PNR representatives) that had gathered there to participate. And with fear that there was going to be conflicts between both sides. The decision by the organizers – the Permanent Coordinating Committee of Unions and Associations of Security Forces and Services – enraged the agents of many task forces. The protests increased in tone, confusion arose and, all of a sudden, when they least expected it, the security forces agents passed over the organizer's decision and started their parade. The Coordinating Committee had lost control over the situation. The parade was, indeed, done, until Terreiro do Paço, where the Ministry of Internal Affairs was. There, the agents demanded changes in the health system, retirement and better work conditions. The far-right militants, after having had a stage to talk to the media started to disperse, seeing groups here and there along the parade. But they didn't follow the demonstration behind the police forces."

=== Criminal controversies ===
Some of its members were convicted of racial discrimination and violent crimes, among others, the murder of a PSR leader (José Carvalho) and the racially motivated murder of Alcindo Monteiro, after being linked to right-wing armed groups such as the National Front and Portuguese Hammerskins. However, the way these groups act had led to a distancing by the then PNR towards said groups. As a result, the former Portuguese Hammerskins leader Mário Machado has decided to try to create a new party, the New Social Order.

== Bibliography ==
- Marchi, Riccardo (2013). "The Extreme right in 21st-Century Portugal: the Partido Nacional Renovador" ( (PDF)). In Ralf Melzer; Sebastian Serafin (eds.). Right-Wing extremism in Europe. Friedrich-Ebert-Stiftung, Forum Berlin. pp. 132–155. ISBN 978-3-86498-522-5. Archived from the originalpdf on 2 February 2017.
