= 2011 Portuguese legislative election =

- 5 June 2011

All 230 seats in the Assembly of the Republic 116 seats needed for a majority
- Opinion polls
- Registered: 9,624,354 ▲1.1%
- Turnout: 5,585,054 (58.0%) ▼1.7 pp
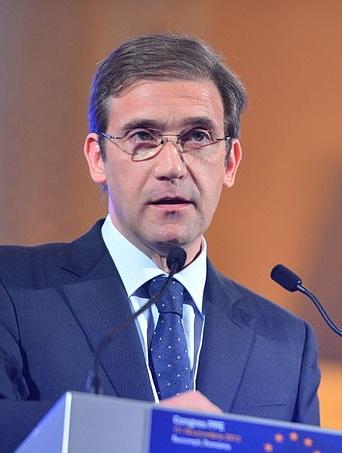

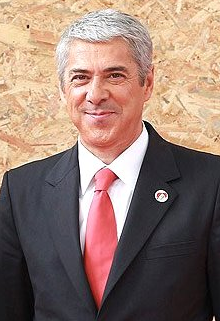

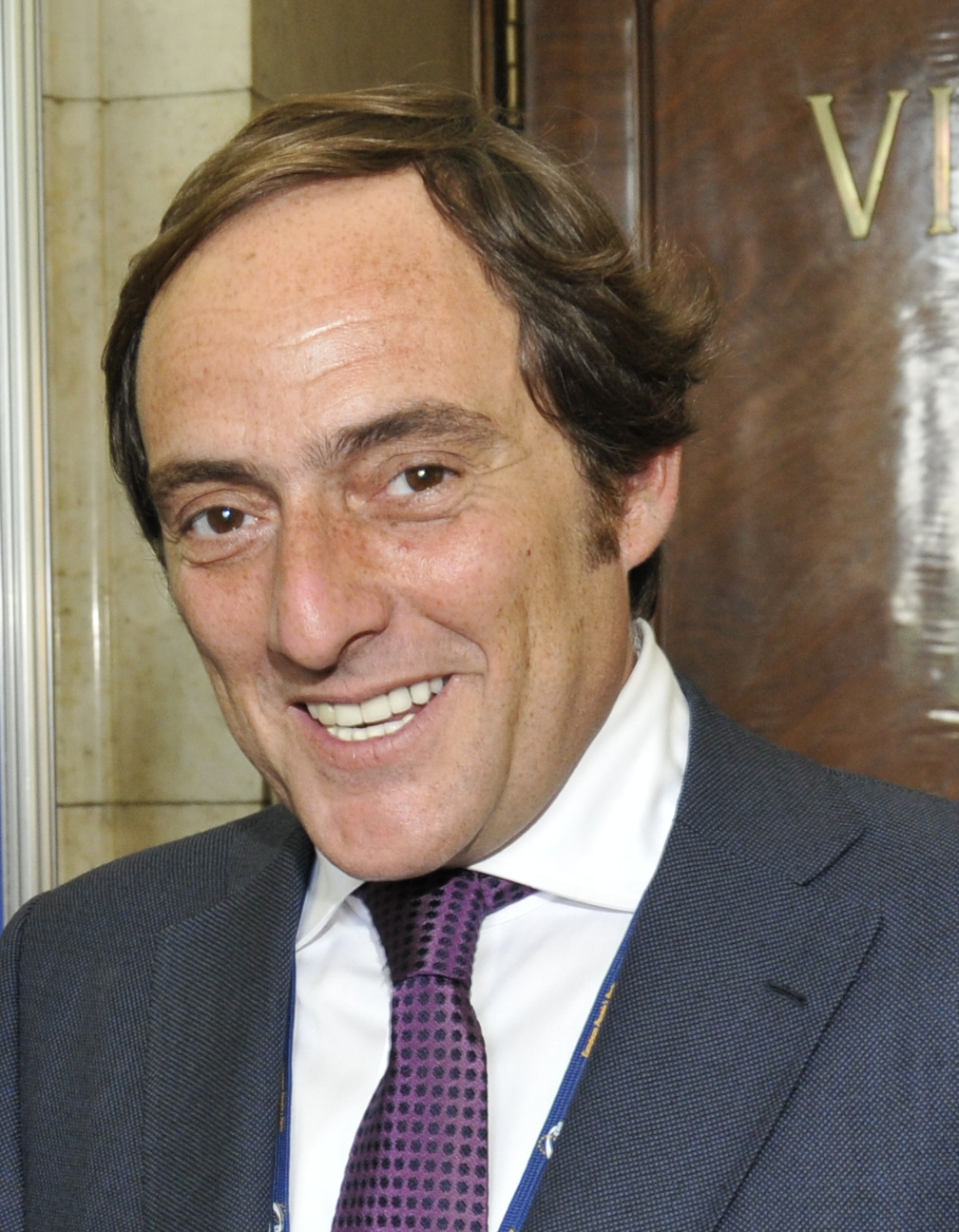

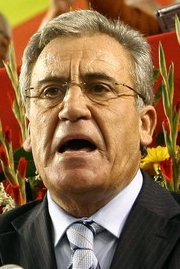

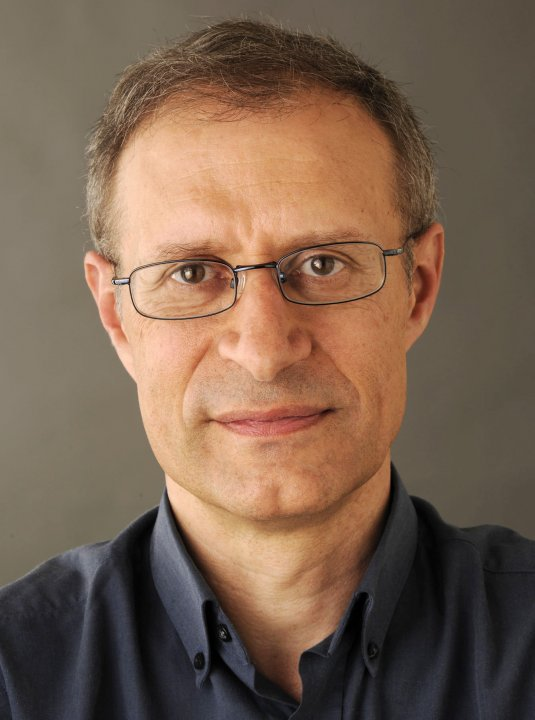
	First party	Second party	Third party
Leader	Pedro Passos Coelho	José Sócrates	Paulo Portas
Party	PSD	PS	CDS–PP
Leader since	26 March 2010	26 September 2004	21 April 2007
Leader's seat	Vila Real	Castelo Branco	Aveiro
Last election	81 seats, 29.1%	97 seats, 36.6%	21 seats, 10.4%
Seats won	108	74	24
Seat change	▲27	▼23	▲3
Popular vote	2,159,181	1,566,347	653,888
Percentage	38.7%	28.0%	11.7%
Swing	▲9.6 pp	▼8.6 pp	▲1.3 pp
	Fourth party	Fifth party
Leader	Jerónimo de Sousa	Francisco Louçã
Party	PCP	BE
Alliance	CDU
Leader since	27 November 2004	24 March 1999
Leader's seat	Lisbon	Lisbon
Last election	15 seats, 7.9%	16 seats, 9.8%
Seats won	16	8
Seat change	▲1	▼8
Popular vote	441,147	288,923
Percentage	7.9%	5.2%
Swing	0.0 pp	▼4.6 pp
Prime Minister before election
José Sócrates
PS
Prime Minister after election
Pedro Passos Coelho
PSD

The 2011 Portuguese legislative election was held on 5 June, to elect all 230 members of the Assembly of the Republic. Pedro Passos Coelho led the centre-right Social Democratic Party to victory over the Socialist Party, led by incumbent Prime Minister José Sócrates. The conservative Social Democrats won with almost 39 percent of the votes, securing 108 seats, with the result exceeding opinion poll forecasts. The right-wing won a clear majority, with the CDS – People's Party also polling strongly, and achieving its best result since 1983. Of the twenty districts of the country, Pedro Passos Coelho's party won seventeen, including the large districts of Lisbon and Porto.

The defeat of the PS was severe, as they lost in eleven districts and fell below 30 percent of the votes cast, a first since the election of 1991. This heavy defeat led José Sócrates to resign as general secretary of the party on election night. However, it was not the Socialists' worst result, which dated back to 1987 when they polled 30 points behind the Social Democrats. The Socialists were also beaten in José Sócrates district, Castelo Branco, that he dominated since 1995.

For the left-wing parties, the result was mixed. On one hand, the Left Bloc faced a huge setback, losing half of its MPs and going back to its 2005 numbers, while the communist Unitary Democratic Coalition remained stable. Overall, the left-wing parties were ten points behind the right-wing parties, the largest difference since the absolute majority of Social Democrat Aníbal Cavaco Silva in the early 1990s. Voter turnout was one of the lowest in Portuguese election history, with just 58 percent of the electorate casting their ballot on election day.

== Background ==
The previous parliamentary election was held in September 2009, and, as such, technically no election was due until September or October 2013. However, the 2009 election resulted in a hung parliament, as the Socialist Party (PS) continued to be the most voted force but lost the majority it previously had in the chamber. A minority government supported by the PS and headed by José Sócrates was formed, relying on negotiations with the opposition parties (namely the major opposition party PSD) to approve the most important and/or controversial bills, such as the State Budgets for 2010 and 2011, at a time of profound fiscal problems and recession. On social issues, same-sex marriages was legalized by Parliament in June 2010. As it was the case in his first term, Sócrates name was involved in a new corruption investigation, Face Oculta, and although he was cleared of any wrongdoing, authorities continued to investigate the then Prime Minister, which ended in the case that would lead to his arrest in 2014.

=== Fall of the government ===
In March 2011, when the government had tried to introduce another Stability and Growth Pact (PEC), but without consultation with the president and parliament, opposition parties called for a resolution vote. The vote came over proposed spending cuts and tax hikes that had been demanded by the EU to offer a bailout over Portugal's debt levels amidst the European sovereign debt crisis. PM José Sócrates had previously said that if the measure failed he would not be able to govern anymore. All five opposition parties combined to vote down the measure. With all other parties voting against the government, the Socialist Party was unable to avoid defeat as it only had 97 MPs in the 230-seat parliament. Following the vote in parliament on the evening of 23 March, Sócrates stepped down, reiterating that he could no longer govern the country: "Today every opposition party rejected the measures proposed by the government to prevent that Portugal resort to external aid. The opposition removed from the government the conditions to govern. As a result, I have tendered my resignation to the president." The main opposition party, the Social Democratic Party (PSD), tipped the scales against the government by voting against the package, despite having abstained when voting previous austerity measures.

Following the vote, European markets read the move as making a possible 50–70 billion euro bailout "inevitable", the day before a European Union summit concerning the debt crisis. German Chancellor Angela Merkel praised Socrates for his "far-reaching" austerity bill in parliament, while Portuguese two-year bond yields increased to the highest rate since 1999 on speculation of possible further credit downgrades.

President Aníbal Cavaco Silva then met with the various political parties to either resolve the crisis, or dissolve the parliament and call an early election, which, according to the Portuguese Constitution, would be held no sooner than 55 days after the announcement. On 1 April, the president set 5 June as the date for an early election, deeming it the only way to create the conditions for a new government.

Following the call for an election, Sócrates finally made a request for a bailout from the EU on 6 April, as the country's sovereign bond yield hit a record high; Portugal became the third EU state after Greece and Ireland, respectively, to request an EU bailout. Sócrates said in a nationwide television address that his caretaker government had formally requested a bailout as it was "inevitable" and that "I tried everything, but in conscience we have reached a moment when not taking this decision would imply risks that the country should not take." The Social Democrats' leader, Pedro Passos Coelho, said that his party would support the aid request; the International Monetary Fund also added that it was ready to support the assistance requested by Portugal. Finance Minister Fernando Teixeira dos Santos also said that Portugal would need the European Union support to avoid defaulting on its debt. In response, the European Commissioner for Economic and Monetary Affairs Olli Rehn said the action was "a responsible move" and that the specific amount of aid money would soon be determined. European Union officials suggested that they hoped a deal would be finalised by the middle of May with an expected bailout of around 80 billion euros.

=== Leadership changes and challenges ===
==== Social Democratic Party ====
The then PSD leader Manuela Ferreira Leite declined to run for another term, and a new election to elect a new party leader was called for 26 March 2010. Pedro Passos Coelho, second place holder in 2008, won the elections by a landslide. The results were the following:

Ballot: 26 March 2010
Candidate	Votes	%
Pedro Passos Coelho	31,671	61.2
Paulo Rangel	17,821	34.4
José Pedro Aguiar Branco	1,769	3.4
Castanheira Barros	138	0.3
Blank/Invalid ballots	349	0.7
Turnout	51,748	66.26
Source: Official Results

==== Socialist Party ====
Then party leader, and Prime Minister, José Sócrates ran for another term as leader, and faced a challenge from three party members: Jacinto Serrão, Fonseca Ferreira and António Brotas. The ballot was held on 25 and 26 March 2011, just two days after Sócrates announced his resignation following a negative vote on his policy measures in Parliament. Sócrates was re-elected with 92% of the votes, while the other candidates all polled below 4%.

Ballot: 25 and 26 March 2011
Candidate	Votes	%
José Sócrates	26,713	91.7
Jacinto Serrão	954	3.3
Fonseca Ferreira	728	2.5
António Brotas	257	0.9
Blank/Invalid ballots	489	1.7
Turnout	29,141	89.95

=== Electoral system ===
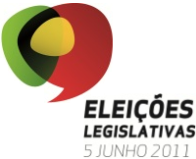
Official logo of the election.

The Assembly of the Republic has 230 members elected to four-year terms. Governments do not require absolute majority support of the Assembly to hold office, as even if the number of opposers of government is larger than that of the supporters, the number of opposers still needs to be equal or greater than 116 (absolute majority) for both the Government's Programme to be rejected or for a motion of no confidence to be approved.

The number of seats assigned to each district depends on the district magnitude. The use of the d'Hondt method makes for a higher effective threshold than certain other allocation methods such as the Hare quota or Sainte-Laguë method, which are more generous to small parties.

For these elections, and compared with the 2009 elections, the MPs distributed by districts were the following:

District	Number of MPs	Map
Lisbon	47	
Porto	39	
Braga	19	
Setúbal	17	
Aveiro	16	
Leiria and Santarém	10	
Viseu, Coimbra^{(–1)} and Faro^{(+1)}	9	
Madeira and Viana do Castelo	6	
Azores and Vila Real	5	
Castelo Branco and Guarda	4	
Beja, Bragança and Évora	3	
Portalegre, Europe and Outside Europe	2	

== Parties ==
As in previous elections, the possibility of a joint PSD/CDS–PP coalition resurfaced, but was again rejected by the Social Democrats (PSD), while CDS–PP showed openness to the idea. The table below lists the parties represented in the Assembly of the Republic during the 11th legislature (2009–2011) and that also partook in the election:

Name		Ideology	Political position	Leader	2009 result	
Name		Ideology	Political position	Leader	%	Seats
PS	Socialist Party; Partido Socialista	Social democracy Third Way	Centre-left to Centre	José Sócrates	36.6%	97 / 230
PPD/PSD	Social Democratic Party; Partido Social Democrata	Conservatism; Classical liberalism	Centre-right	Pedro Passos Coelho	29.1%	81 / 230
CDS–PP	CDS – People's Party; Centro Democrático e Social – Partido Popular	Christian democracy Conservatism	Centre-right to right-wing	Paulo Portas	10.4%	21 / 230
BE	Left Bloc; Bloco de Esquerda	Democratic socialism Anti-capitalism	Left-wing	Francisco Louçã	9.8%	16 / 230
PCP	Portuguese Communist Party; Partido Comunista Português	Communism; Marxism–Leninism	Far-left	Jerónimo de Sousa	7.9% (Note: The Portuguese Communist Party (PCP) and the Ecologist Party "The Greens" (PEV) contested the 2009 election in a coalition called Unitary Democratic Coalition (CDU) and won a combined 7.9% of the vote and elected 15 MPs to parliament.)	13 / 230
PEV	Ecologist Party "The Greens"; Partido Ecologista "Os Verdes"	Eco-socialism; Green politics	Left-wing	Heloísa Apolónia	7.9%	2 / 230

== Concurrent issues ==
Popular anger arose during the electoral process leading to mass protests in multiple cities around the country.

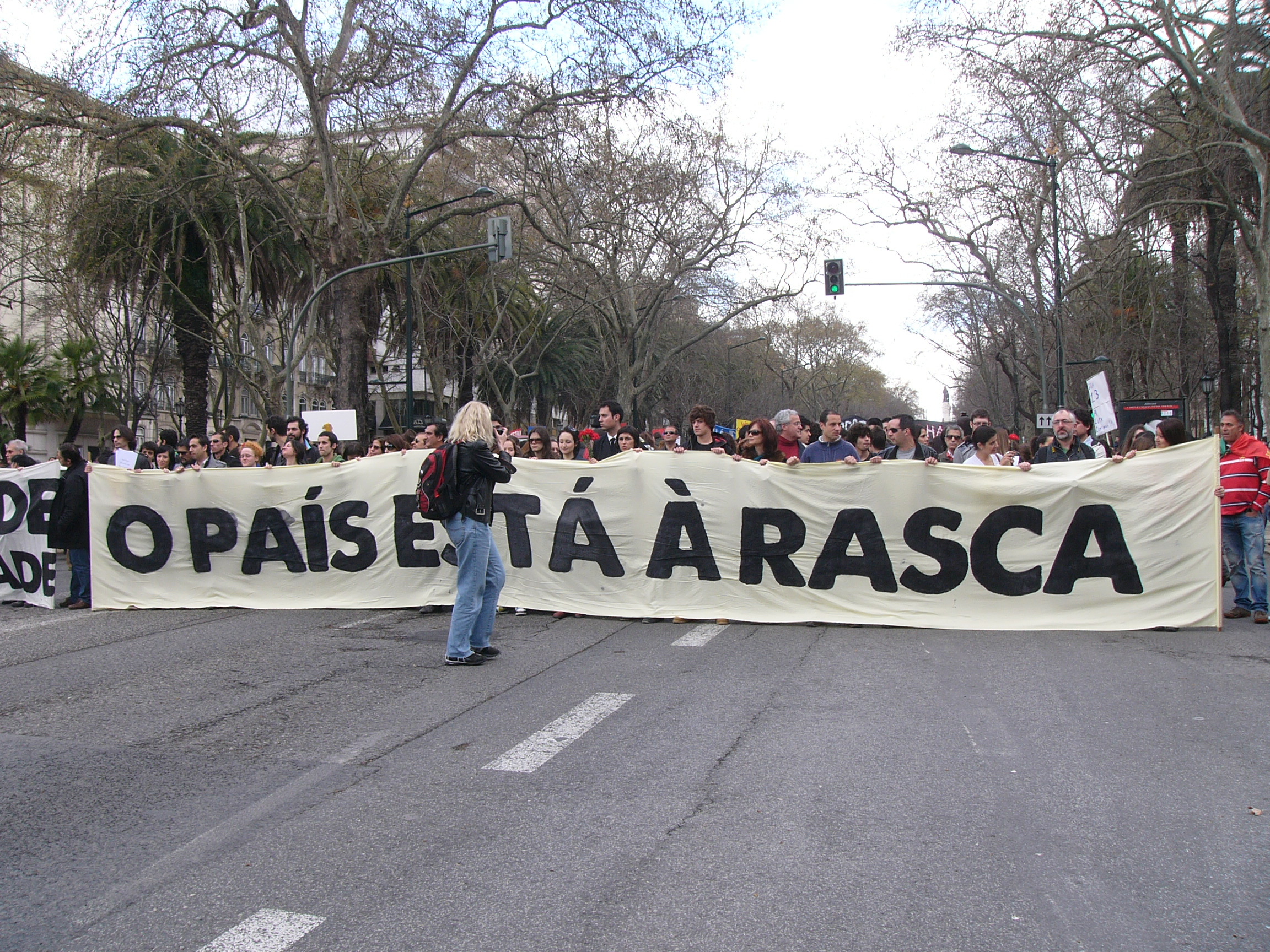
Geração à Rasca banner in the 12 March 2011 demonstration in Lisbon.

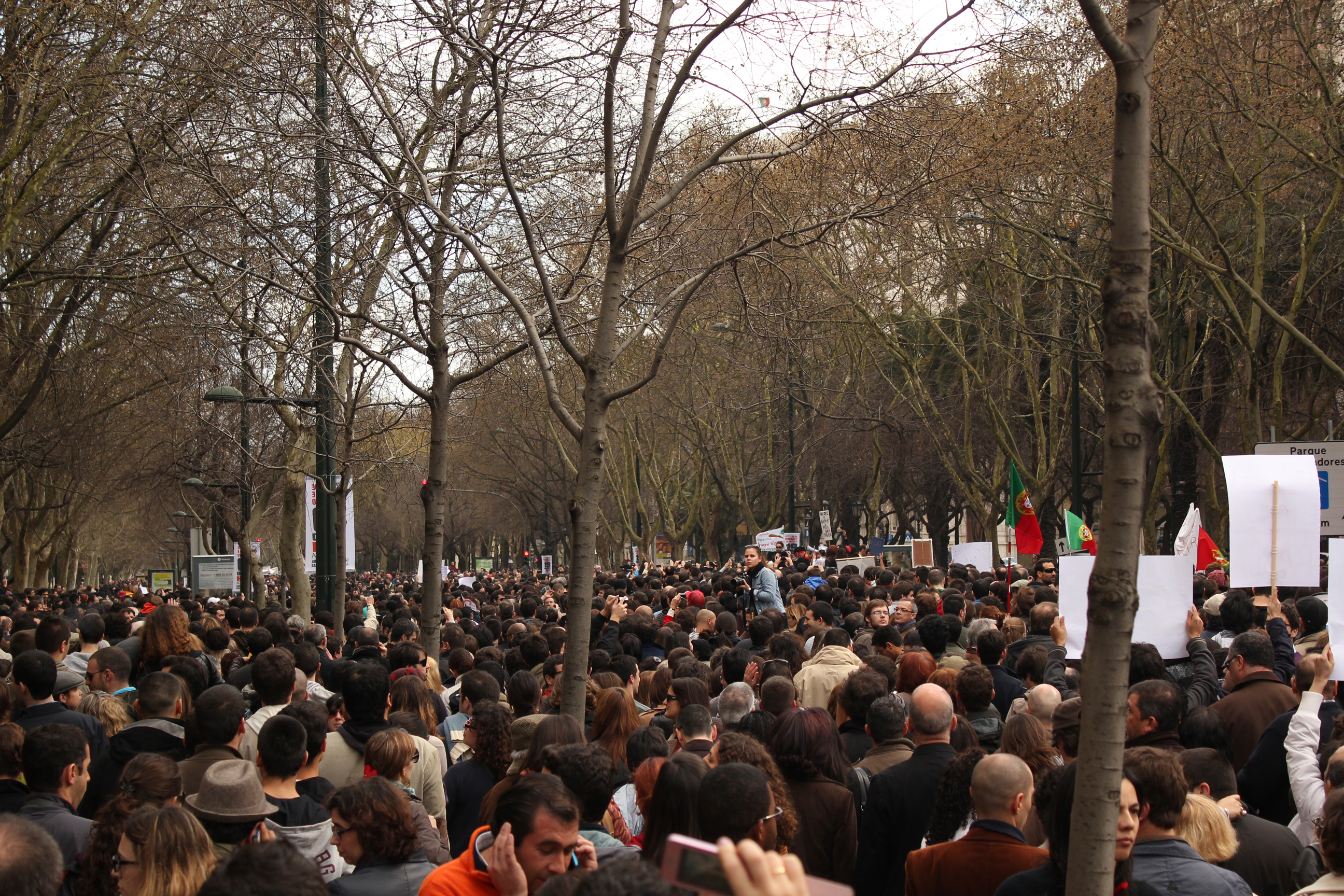
Crowd in the Geração à Rasca demonstration in Lisbon, 12 March 2011.

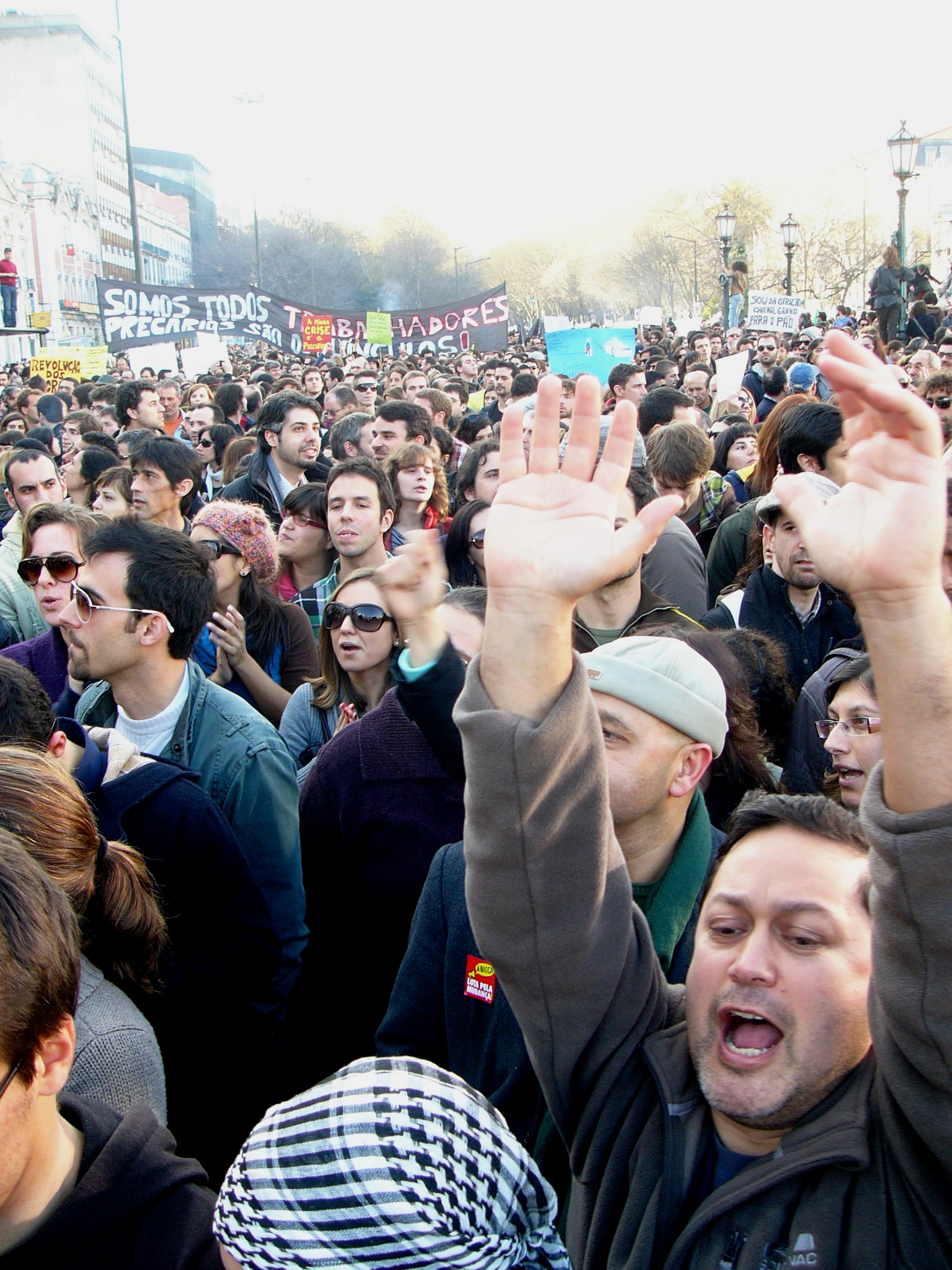
Crowd in the Geração à Rasca demonstration in Lisbon, 12 March 2011.

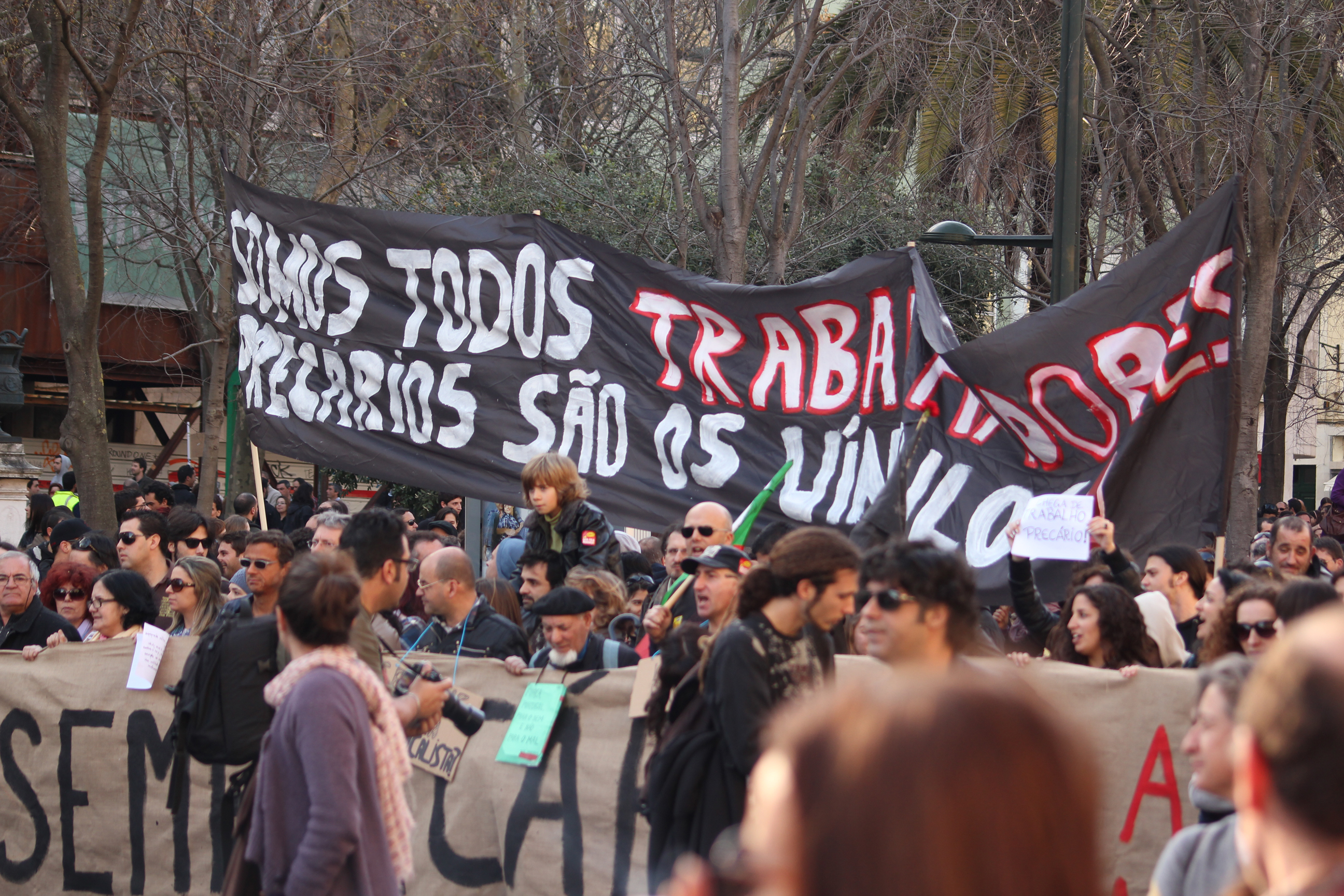
Crowd with banner in the Geração à Rasca demonstration in Lisbon, 12 March 2011.

== External influence ==
=== EU bailout ===
In what was read as external interference during the campaign, EU commissioner Olli Rehn said Portugal must make even stronger budget cuts than the measures that failed in parliament, which led to the fall of the government. EU finance ministers said that about 80 billion euros could be available by mid-May should the austerity measures they demanded pass. Rehn also said that the measures would be "a starting point" and that it was "indeed essential in Portugal to reach a cross-party agreement ensuring that such a programme can be adopted [by] May." On 16 May, the EU endorsed a 78-billion euro joint package with the IMF.

Finnish influence

Facing an election of his own, Finnish finance minister Jyrki Katainen said that Portugal's deficit-reduction steps should be even stronger than what was proposed in parliament prior to the election call. "The package must be really strict because otherwise it doesn't make any sense. The package must be harder and more comprehensive than the one the parliament voted against", he said. The surge in popularity of the True Finns prior to the election as also a threat Portugal's bailout. Finland's support for the bailout was important because it would need unanimous support to pass.

=== Economic outlook ===
On 5 April, Moody's cut Portugal's debt grade for the second time in a week, citing it as "driven primarily by increased political, budgetary and economic uncertainty, which increased the risk that the government will be unable to achieve [its] ambitious deficit reduction targets." The debt rating was decreased from A3 to Baa1, which was three grades above junk bond status.

=== IMF bailout ===
On 20 May, the IMF approved a €26 billion bailout for Portugal as part of joint support mechanisms with the EU. Of the total, €6.1 billion would be made available immediately.

== Campaign period ==
=== Issues ===
The campaign was completely dominated by the severe economic crisis and the IMF–Eurozone financial bailout, in which tax hikes and austerity measures, privatizations, labor market reforms, plus the need for stability to enact this policies, were center stage. Also during the campaign, an already lengthy corruption investigation into the purchase of submarines, during the tenure of CDS–PP leader Paulo Portas as Minister of Defence in 2004, became a topic of discussion and would remain one in the following years.

=== Party slogans ===
Party or alliance	Original slogan	English translation	Refs
PS	"Defender Portugal"	"Defending Portugal"	
PSD	"Está na hora de mudar"	"It's time to change"	
CDS–PP	"Este é o momento"	"This is the moment"	
BE	"Mudar de futuro"	"Changing the future"	
CDU	"Agora CDU"	"CDU Now"	

=== Candidates' debates ===
==== With parties represented in Parliament ====
2011 Portuguese legislative election debates
Date	Organisers	Moderator(s)	P Present A Absent invitee N Non-invitee					
Date	Organisers	Moderator(s)	PS Sócrates	PSD Passos	CDS–PP Portas	BE Louçã	CDU Jerónimo	Refs
6 May	RTP1	Vítor Gonçalves	N	N	P	N	P	
9 May	TVI	Júdite de Sousa	P	N	P	N	N	
10 May	TVI	Júdite de Sousa	N	P	N	N	P	
11 May	SIC	Clara de Sousa	P	N	N	P	N	
12 May	RTP1	Vítor Gonçalves	N	N	N	P	P	
13 May	SIC	Clara de Sousa	N	P	P	N	N	
16 May	SIC	Clara de Sousa	P	N	N	N	P	
17 May	TVI	Júdite de Sousa	N	P	N	P	N	
19 May	SIC	Clara de Sousa	N	N	P	P	N	
20 May	RTP1	Vítor Gonçalves	P	P	N	N	N	
Candidate viewed as "most convincing" in each debate
Date	Organisers	Polling firm/Link						
Date	Organisers	Polling firm/Link	PS	PSD	CDS–PP	BE	CDU	Notes
20 May	RTP1	UCP–CESOP	33.9	46.4	—N/a	—N/a	—N/a	12.7% Tie; 7.0% Undecided

==== With parties not represented in Parliament ====
A debate between parties not represented in Parliament was also broadcast on RTP1. The debate was marked by protests from the Portuguese Labour Party candidate, José Manuel Coelho, who sported banners and made numerous interruptions that disrupted the debate several times.

2011 Portuguese legislative election debates
Date	Organisers	Moderator(s)	P Present A Absent invitee N Non-invitee S Surrogate							
Date	Organisers	Moderator(s)	PCTP Pereira	MEP Marques	PNR Coelho	MPT Graça	PTP M. Coelho	PPM Estevão	PAN Borges	Refs
19 May	RTP1	Sandra Sousa	P	P	P	P	P	P	P	

== Opinion polling ==
View source data.

== Voter turnout ==
The table below shows voter turnout throughout election day including voters from Overseas.

Turnout	Time								
Turnout	12:00			16:00			19:00		
Turnout	2009	2011	±	2009	2011	±	2009	2011	±
Total	21.29%	20.01%	▼1.28 pp	43.30%	41.98%	▼1.32 pp	59.68%	58.03%	▼1.65 pp

== Results ==
Anti-incumbency led to the defeat of the ruling party, even more than polls predicted. Pedro Passos Coelho of the Social Democratic Party was the Prime Minister-designate.

=== National summary ===
Party	Votes	%	+/–	Seats	+/–
Social Democratic Party	2,159,181	38.66	+9.55	108	+27
Socialist Party	1,566,347	28.05	–8.51	74	–23
CDS – People's Party	653,888	11.71	+1.28	24	+3
Unitary Democratic Coalition (Note: Portuguese Communist Party (14 MPs) and "The Greens" (2 MPs).)	441,147	7.90	+0.04	16	+1
Left Bloc	288,923	5.17	–4.64	8	–8
Portuguese Workers' Communist Party	62,610	1.12	+0.19	0	0
Party for Animals and Nature	57,995	1.04	New	0	New
Earth Party	22,705	0.41	+0.19	0	0
Hope for Portugal Movement	21,942	0.39	–0.07	0	0
National Renovator Party	17,548	0.31	+0.11	0	0
Portuguese Labour Party	16,895	0.30	+0.21	0	0
People's Monarchist Party	14,687	0.26	–0.01	0	0
New Democracy Party	11,806	0.21	–0.18	0	0
Portugal Pro-Life Party	8,209	0.15	–0.00	0	0
Workers' Party of Socialist Unity	4,572	0.08	+0.00	0	0
Democratic Party of the Atlantic	4,569	0.08	New	0	New
Humanist Party	3,588	0.06	—	0	—
Total	5,356,612	100.00	–	230	0
Valid votes	5,356,612	95.92	–0.98		
Invalid votes	79,399	1.42	+0.07		
Blank votes	148,618	2.66	+0.92		
Total votes	5,584,629	100.00	–		
Registered voters/turnout	9,624,354	58.03	–1.65		
Source: Comissão Nacional de Eleições

Vote share
PSD	38.66%
PS	28.05%
CDS-PP	11.71%
CDU	7.90%
BE	5.17%
PCTP/MRPP	1.12%
PAN	1.04%
Others	2.27%
Blank/Invalid	4.08%

Parliamentary seats
PSD	46.96%
PS	32.17%
CDS-PP	10.43%
CDU	6.96%
BE	3.48%

=== Distribution by constituency ===
Results of the 2011 election of the Portuguese Assembly of the Republic by constituency
Constituency	%	S	%	S	%	S	%	S	%	S	Total S
Constituency	PSD		PS		CDS–PP		CDU		BE		Total S
Azores	47.2	3	25.7	2	12.1	-	2.5	-	4.4	-	5
Aveiro	44.5	8	25.9	5	12.9	2	4.1	-	5.0	1	16
Beja	23.7	1	29.8	1	7.3	-	25.4	1	5.2	-	3
Braga	40.1	9	32.9	7	10.4	2	4.9	1	4.2	-	19
Bragança	52.1	2	26.1	1	11.1	-	2.6	-	2.3	-	3
Castelo Branco	37.9	2	34.8	2	9.6	-	4.9	-	4.2	-	4
Coimbra	40.1	5	29.2	3	9.9	1	6.2	-	5.8	-	9
Évora	27.6	1	29.0	1	8.7	-	22.0	1	4.9	-	3
Faro	37.0	4	23.0	2	12.7	1	8.6	1	8.2	1	9
Guarda	46.3	3	28.3	1	11.2	-	3.6	-	3.4	-	4
Leiria	47.0	6	20.7	3	12.8	1	5.0	-	5.4	-	10
Lisbon	34.1	18	27.5	14	13.8	7	9.6	5	5.7	3	47
Madeira	49.4	4	14.7	1	13.7	1	3.7	-	4.0	-	6
Portalegre	32.5	1	32.4	1	10.2	-	12.8	-	4.5	-	2
Porto	39.2	17	32.0	14	10.0	4	6.2	2	5.1	2	39
Santarém	37.7	5	25.9	3	12.3	1	9.0	1	5.8	-	10
Setúbal	25.2	5	26.9	5	12.1	2	19.6	4	7.1	1	17
Viana do Castelo	43.6	3	26.2	2	13.4	1	4.9	-	4.4	-	6
Vila Real	51.4	3	29.1	2	8.7	-	3.1	-	2.3	-	5
Viseu	48.4	5	26.7	3	12.4	1	2.9	-	2.9	-	9
Europe	29.2	1	39.6	1	5.5	-	4.4	-	3.3	-	2
Outside Europe	55.1	2	18.0	-	4.1	-	0.8	-	1.1	-	2
Total	38.7	108	28.1	74	11.7	24	7.9	16	5.2	8	230
Source: Comissão Nacional de Eleições

=== Maps ===
Winner and seats by constituency.

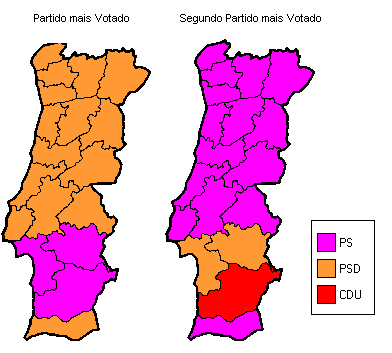
First and second most voted political force by constituency.

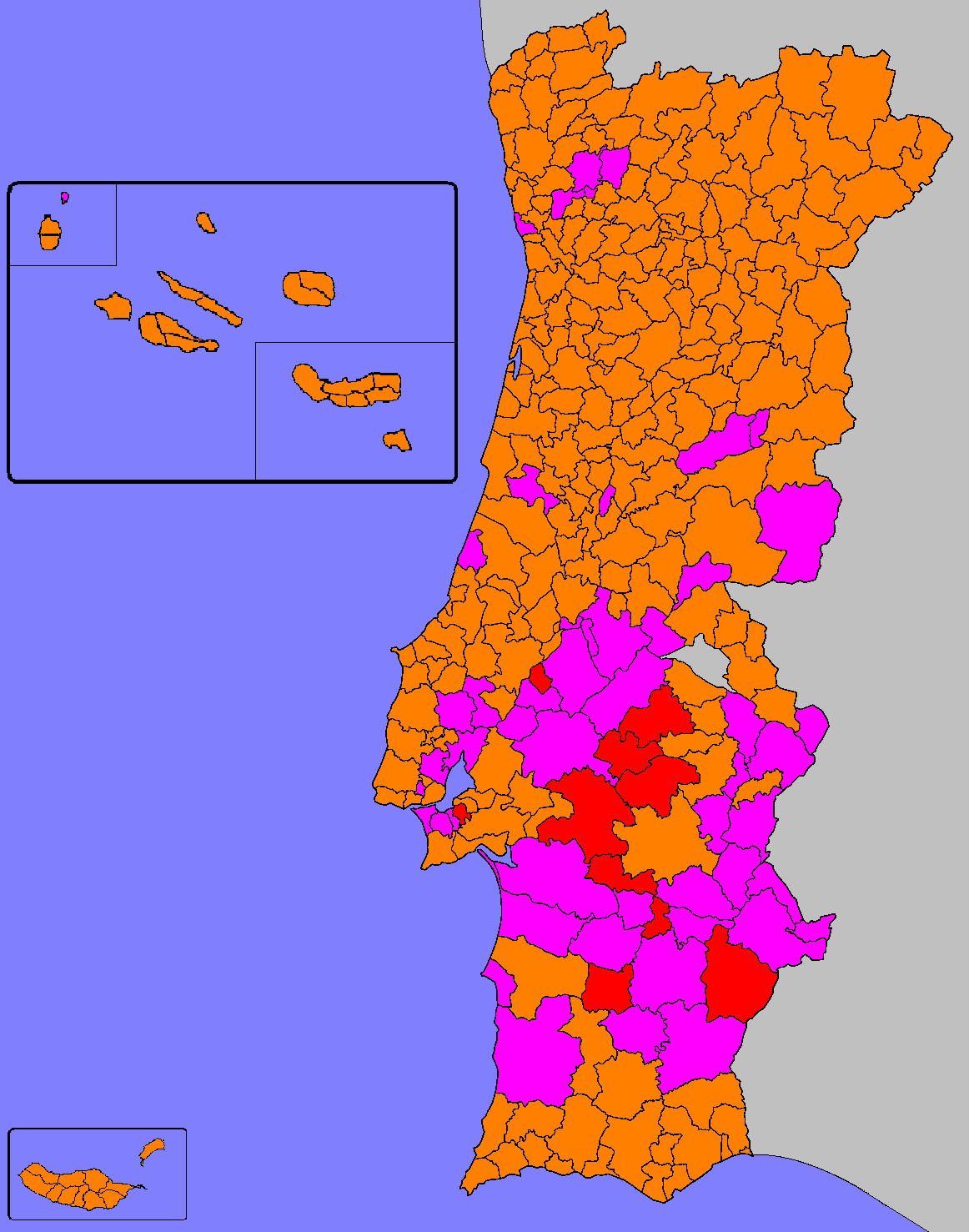
Most voted political force by municipality.

== Aftermath ==
=== Government formation ===
On 6 June 2011, President Aníbal Cavaco Silva called on Pedro Passos Coelho to form a government with "majority support in parliament" and asked for urgency in its formation. Given the election results and the impossibility of forming a majority government with the parliamentary support of a single party, the Social Democratic Party (PSD), led by Pedro Passos Coelho, signed, on 16 June 2011, an agreement to form a coalition government with the CDS – People's Party, led by Paulo Portas. The XIX Constitutional Government took office on 21 June 2011.

=== 2013 political crisis ===
On 3 July 2013, secretary of state for treasury Maria Luís Albuquerque replaced Vítor Gaspar as the finance minister. As a result, CDS–PP leader, and foreign affairs minister, Paulo Portas created a political crisis by tendering his "irrevocable" resignation from the government, citing that the change in the finance ministry would offer "mere continuity", regarding austerity measures for deficit reduction plans. Following this announcement, Passos Coelho refused to accept Portas' resignation or to resign from his position himself, adding: "I will try to clarify and guarantee, together with the CDS, all the conditions for governmental stability and to continue the strategy of overcoming the national crisis." Furthermore, he said that the government had a "tight-knit majority in Parliament to support it" and that the coalition agreement indicated that it was "essential to change the troika's memorandum through renegotiation to find a payment method that does not hinder the country's economic growth." A few days later, both men reached a deal in which Portas would become deputy prime minister, however, this deal was rejected by President Cavaco Silva, who attempted to push for the formation of a national unity government with the Socialists. Nevertheless, talks between the major parties collapsed and Cavaco Silva was forced to accept the original deal between Passos and Portas. In the meantime, a motion of no confidence against the government, called by Green party, was rejected on 18 July 2013.

== See also ==
- Politics of Portugal
- List of political parties in Portugal
- Elections in Portugal
