= Romani people in Portugal =

Portuguese Romanis
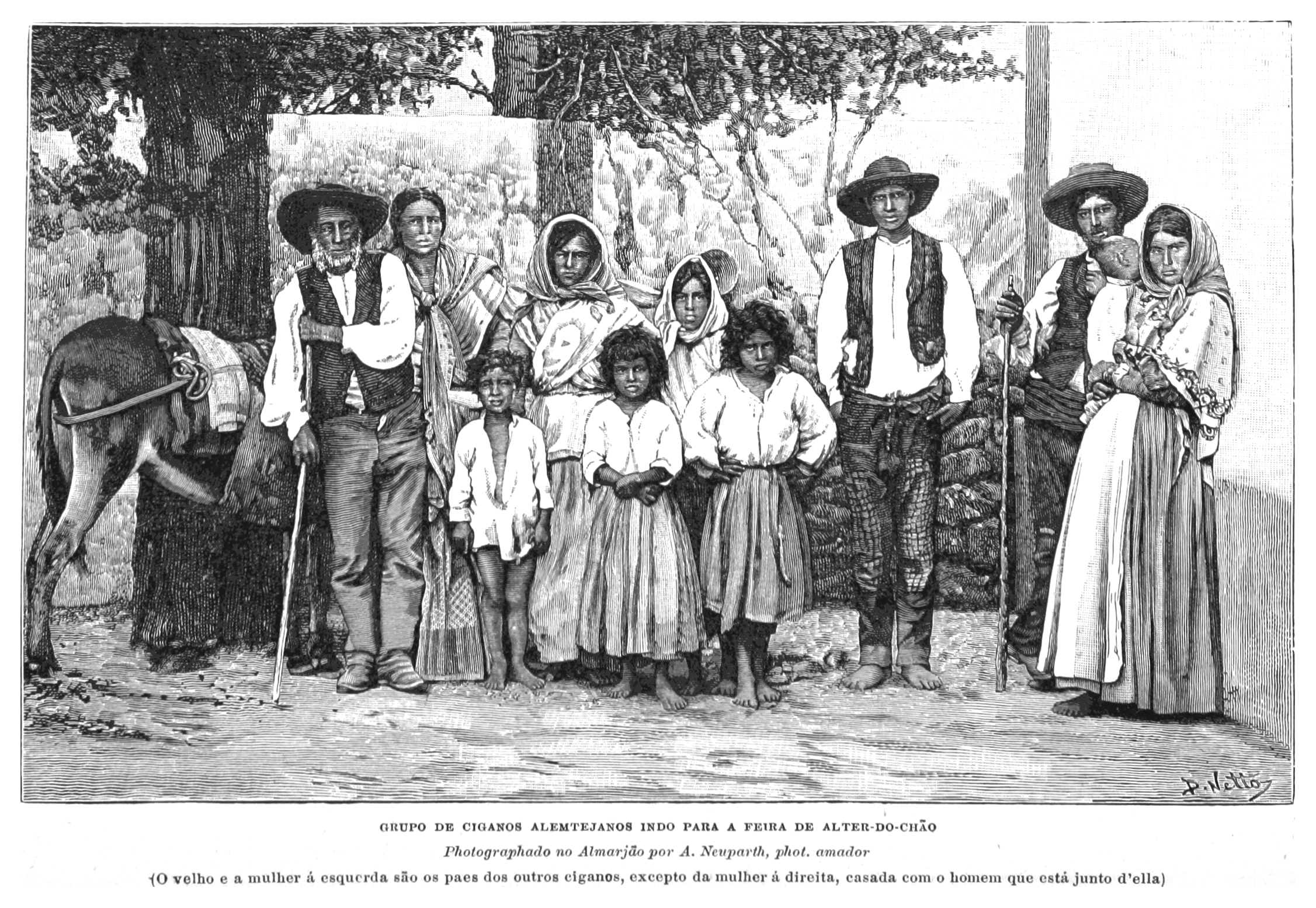
- 1892 description of a group of Romani from the Alentejo

Total population
- est. 30,000 – 50,000

Regions with significant populations
- Lisbon, Setúbal, Alentejo and Algarve

Languages
- Portuguese, Caló

Religion
- Roman Catholicism

The Romani people in Portugal, known in spoken Portuguese as ciganos (Portuguese pronunciation: [siˈɣɐnuʃ]), but also alternatively known as calés, calós, and boémios, are a minority ethnic group. The exact numbers of Romani people in the country are unknown—estimates vary from 40,000 to 60,000.

As implied by some of their most common local names, the Portuguese Romani belong to the Iberian Kale group, like most of the fellow Lusophone Brazilian ciganos, and the Spanish Romani people, known as gitanos, that share their same ethnic group. Their presence in the country in and around Minho has been registered in the second half of the 15th century when they crossed the border from neighbouring Spain. Early on, due to their sociocultural differences and nomadic lifestyle, the ciganos were the object of fierce discrimination and persecution. As a group of people, the Romani have had a disproportionate representation in annual arrests, incarceration numbers and police reports across the country and throughout time.

The number of Romani people in Portugal is difficult to estimate, since it is forbidden to collect statistics about race or ethnic categories in the country. According to data from Council of Europe's European Commission against Racism and Intolerance there are about 40,000 to 60,000 spread all over the country. According to the Portuguese branch of Amnesty International, there are about 30,000 to 50,000 around 2010. The national High Commissioner for Migrations places the number at around 37,000.

== History ==
The first Romani arrived in Portugal in the late 15th century. The presence of Romani in Portugal in the early 16th century is confirmed by the title of a play by Gil Vicente from 1521, Act of the Gypsies (O Auto das Ciganas). Starting with King John III in 1526 and throughout the centuries, numerous discriminatory laws (some listed below) were aimed at the Romani, who were only recognised as citizens in 1822, after the Liberal Revolution of 1820. In this context, Portuguese Romani people unable to embrace a socially-accepted level of cultural assimilation by giving up their language, dress code and customs, and deemed irredeemable, were expelled to the Portuguese colonies of São Tomé and Príncipe, Cape Verde and Brazil.

A latter wave of Romani migration in the late 19th century entered through the northern border.

=== Legal status ===
After the first Romani arrived in Portugal in the turn of the 15th to the 16th century and over the following centuries there were several laws passed marginalizing the ciganos. From the early 16th century until the early 19th century, they were forbidden from entering and expelled from the country, forced into exile in the colonies, used as forced labour in the sailing ships and forbidden from using their language and traditional attire and from performing fortune telling. Such strictures and compulsions were introduced by the following monarchs:

- King John III in 1526 and 1538;
- Queen Catherine, while regent, in 1557;
- King Sebastian in 1573;
- King Henry in 1579;
- King Philip I in 1592 and in his Philippine Ordinations, a legal code put together in the late 16th and the early 17th century;
- King Philip II in 1606, 1613, 1614 and 1618;
- King John IV in 1647, 1650 and 1654;
- King Peter II in 1689;
- King John V in 1707, 1708, 1718 and 1745;
- King Joseph I in 1751 and 1756;
- Queen Mary I in 1800.

Only with the Liberal Constitution of 1822 were the Romani recognised as Portuguese citizens.

From 1920 to 1985, a statute of the Portuguese gendarmerie (Guarda Nacional Republicana) determined that this military force should carry out special monitoring of the Romani communities. The 1920 Regulation on the Rural Services of the Gendarmerie read "[t]he Gendarmerie staff will carry out strict surveillance on the gypsies, constantly monitoring their movements in order to prevent and punish their frequent acts of looting" (Article 182). In 1980, the Council of the Revolution, following an opinion from its Constitutional Commission arguing the same, declared Articles 182 and 183 of that Regulation unconstitutional for violating the principle of equality.

The later 1985 Regulation on the Services of the Gendarmerie, in a section entitled "Surveillance on nomads, beggars, tramps and prostitutes" (Section XVII), prescribed "special surveillance on groups and caravans of people who usually wander from land to land doing commerce, taking part in fairs or carrying out any other activities proper of a peripatetic lifestyle" and the monitoring of "their movements in order to prevent and punish any criminal acts" (Article 81), a veiled reference to Romani as "nomads" in a passage that closely resembled that of the previous regulation. In a judicial review in 1989, the Constitutional Court declared unconstitutional part of the section where it allowed the officers to perform searches without warrants in the caravans, but not the ethnically discriminatory surveillance measures, although Judges Vital Moreira, Magalhães Godinho and Nunes de Almeida co-signed a dissenting opinion, asserting that the norm meant to discriminate Romani communities and was unconstitutional in its entirety for violating the principle of equality.

Only in 2010 did the Government pass a new regulation overriding the 1985 one, removing all explicit or implicit mentions of specific ethnicities.

=== Racism and discrimination ===
In the turn of the 20th century, in addition to discriminatory norms enshrined in regulations of the gendarmerie, there were at least two episodes of municipalities expelling the local Romani communities due to an increase in criminal activities attributed to them: in Ponte de Lima, Viana do Castelo, in 1993, and in Faro, Algarve, in 2003.

In 2017, André Ventura, then a candidate to the Loures City Council for the centre-right Social Democratic Party, the People's Party and the Monarchist Party, attracted attention for his remarks about the Romani communities during the campaign, claiming they were "almost exclusively dependent on state subsidies" and "considered themselves to be above the law". After the backlash that followed, the People's Party removed their support for the candidate. In 2018, Ventura left the Social Democratic Party and a year later formed a far-right party, Chega, being elected as an MP that same year with the same platform. Since 2017, Ventura has always maintained and reiterated his remarks against the Romani and black communities. In 2020, after asking that Katar Moreira, a black MP born in Guinea-Bissau, "be sent back to her homeland", advocating that the Romani be subject to an ethnically-specific lockdown so not to spread COVID-19, and belittling presidential contender Ana Gomes as the "gypsy candidate", he said in an interview during the presidential election campaign that he "wouldn't like a daughter of his to marry a gypsy". Also in 2020, Ventura was charged with two fines by the Commission for Equality and Against Racial Discrimination for comments against Romani people on social media.

On December 22, 2025, a court in Lisbon, Portugal, orders Chega presidential candidate André Ventura to remove campaign posters targeting the Romani people within 24 hours, ruling that the materials are discriminatory and may incite hatred, or face daily fines of €2,500 (US$2,940) per poster.

=== Integration programmes ===
Governmental and municipal programmes to promote Romani integration were launched in order to try the avoidance of a lifestyle built upon underground economy, plain crime and juvenile delinquency. The areas where most Portuguese Romani used to live were seen as supportive of a criminal way of life so welfare and resettling programmes were directed toward the Portuguese Romani community. In 1996, a Working Group for the Equality and Inclusion of Gypsies was created within the High Commission for Migrations and Ethnic Minorities, publishing a report shortly afterwards. In 2013, the XIX Constitutional Government of Portugal, led then by Prime Minister Pedro Passos Coelho, passed the National Strategy for the Integration of the Romani Communities, creating a Consultative Group for the Integration of the Gypsy Communities, renamed Consultative Council in 2018.

== Notable individuals ==
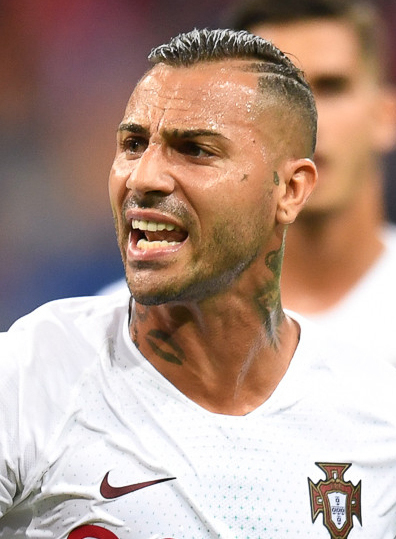
Ricardo Quaresma with Portugal at the 2018 FIFA World Cup

- Carlos Miguel, lawyer and politician who was the first Romani cabinet member in the country and was Mayor of Torres Vedras.
- Maria Severa Onofriana, or simply Severa, the first renowned fado singer.
- Ricardo Quaresma, former football player
- Idália Serrão, musician, media producer and politician, granddaughter to a Romani grandfather.
- Leonor Teles, award-winning filmmaker.
- Nininho Vaz Maia, well-known award-winning musician in Portugal, who has a song "Calon" about being proud of his roots

== See also ==
- Romani people in Brazil
