= Alcindo Monteiro =

Portuguese racial murder victim (1967 - 1995)

- Born: October 1, 1967; Mindelo, Cape Verde
- Died: June 12, 1995 (aged 27); Lisbon, Portugal
- Known for: Victim of a racially motivated murder

Alcindo Bernardo Fortes Monteiro (1 October 1967 – 12 June 1995) was a Portuguese citizen who was murdered at the age of 27 in a racially motivated hate crime.

On 1 October 2020, which would have been his 53rd birthday, the Lisbon City Council unveiled a commemorative plaque in his honor at Rua Garrett, the location where he was attacked. The city described the plaque as a symbol of its commitment to fighting racism and intolerance.

== Biography ==
Alcindo Monteiro was born in Mindelo, Cape Verde, on 1 October 1967, the son of Bernardo and Francisca Monteiro. He was one of seven children. In 1978, at the age of 11, Alcindo emigrated with his family to Portugal, settling in the neighborhood of Casquilhos in Barreiro. He completed his mandatory military service in Beja as a cook. He enjoyed cooking and dancing and dreamed of becoming a hip hop or breakdance dancer.

== Murder ==
On the night of 10 June 1995, Alcindo traveled from Barreiro to Lisbon to go dancing in the Bairro Alto. He was intercepted and brutally beaten by a group of nationalist skinheads in the Chiado area after they had celebrated "Dia da Raça" ("Day of the Race"), a term used during the Portuguese Estado Novo regime to refer to Portugal Day.

Monteiro was found unconscious on Rua Garrett, in front of the Gianni Versace store window, and taken to Hospital de São José along with nine other Black victims. Actor João Lourenço made the emergency call.

Medical reports indicated severe cranial injuries, internal bleeding, cerebral edema, and skull fractures. He fell into a deep coma in the early hours of 11 June and died at 10:30 a.m. on 12 June 1995.

== Trial ==
The trial began on 31 January 1997, at the Monsanto Courthouse in Lisbon, presided over by Judge João Martinho.

Seventeen individuals were charged with murder and assault (the charge of genocide was later dropped). The main defendants included Mário Machado, Nuno Monteiro, Hugo Silva, Ricardo Abreu, José Paiva, and Tiago Palma.

The sentences ranged from 16.5 to 18 years in prison for the primary aggressors.

== See also ==
- Racism in Portugal
