= Liliana Reis =

Portuguese academic and politician

Member of the Assembly of the Republic
- Incumbent
- Assumed office 26 March 2024
- Constituency: Castelo Branco

Member of the Fundão Municipal Assembly
- Incumbent
- Assumed office 29 September 2013

Personal details
- Born: Liliana Domingues Reis; 7 March 1980 (age 46) Fundão, Portugal
- Party: Social Democratic Party
- Spouse: Hugo Ferreira (m. 2020)
- Children: 1
- Education: Catholic University of Portugal; University of Minho
- Occupation: Professor of international relations • politician

Liliana Domingues Reis Ferreira (born 7 March 1980) is a Portuguese professor of political science and international relations at the University of Beira Interior in Covilhã, Portugal. She also directs the international relations undergraduate course at the Universidade Lusófona in Lisbon and is a regular commentator on international events on the Portuguese media. In March 2024 she was elected to the Portuguese parliament as a representative of the Democratic Alliance for the Castelo Branco.

== Education ==
Reis obtained a bachelor's degree in international relations from the University of Minho in 2002. She followed this with postgraduate studies in diplomatic theory and practice at the Catholic University of Portugal, graduating in 2004. In 2006 she received a master's degree in political science and international relations from the same university. Reis obtained a PhD in political science and international relations from the University of Minho in 2015.

== Career ==
Reis teaches in the Department of Sociology at the Faculty of Social and Human Sciences of the University of Beira Interior and in the Faculty of Social Sciences, Education and Administration (FCSEA) of the Universidade Lusófona. In addition to her teaching and research activities, she is a regular commentator on television and radio channels such as SIC Notícias, CNN Portugal, RTP, TSF and Rádio Observador on international events such as the Russian invasion of Ukraine and the Gaza war.

== Political career ==
Reis has served on the municipal assembly of her home town of Fundão since 2013. In 2020 she also became a member of the Assembly of the intermunicipal community of the Beiras e Serra da Estrela. A member of the Social Democratic Party (PSD), she was elected to the Portuguese parliament in March 2024 as the first candidate on the list presented by the Democratic Alliance for the Castelo Branco constituency. In January 2024 allegations were made that she had plagiarised parts of her PhD thesis. She denied this and, noting that the allegations were made two months before the election, attributed them to her political rivals.

== Publications ==
Publications by Reis include:

- Abreu, Joana Rita; Reis, Liliana (eds) 2020. Instituições, Órgãos e Organismos da UE (Institutions, bodies and organs of the European Union). Coimbra: Almedina. ISBN 978-972-40-8645-3
- Reis, Liliana and Muharemi, Robert (eds) (2019). Creation of States and State Building: Perspectives on Kosovo’s Struggle for Statehood ten years after Independence. Phristine: Rochester Institute of Technolology, ISBN 978-9951-8982-3-2
- Sequeira, Tiago e Reis, Liliana (eds) (2019). Climate Change and Global Development. Springer, ISBN 978-3-030-02662-2
- Reis, Liliana (2017). A Construção do Ator Securitário Europeu: a Hora das Escolhas (The Construction of the European Security Body: Time for Choices). Lisbon: Chiado Editora, ISBN 978-989-52-1570-6
