= Opinion polling for the 2011 Portuguese legislative election =

In the run up to the 2011 Portuguese legislative election, various organisations carried out opinion polling to gauge voting intention in Portugal. Results of such polls are displayed in this article.

The date range for these opinion polls are from the previous legislative election, held on 27 September 2009, to the day the next election was held, on 5 June 2011.

== Nationwide polling ==
=== Graphical summary ===
View source data.

=== Polling ===
Poll results are listed in the table below in reverse chronological order, showing the most recent first. The highest percentage figure in each polling survey is displayed in bold, and the background shaded in the leading party's colour. In the instance that there is a tie, then no figure is shaded but both are displayed in bold. The lead column on the right shows the percentage-point difference between the two parties with the highest figures. Poll results use the date the survey's fieldwork was done, as opposed to the date of publication.

Exit poll

Polling firm/Link	Fieldwork date	Sample size	PS	PSD	CDS–PP	BE	CDU	O	Lead
**2011 legislative election**	5 Jun 2011	—N/a	28.1; 74	**38.7**; 108	11.7; 24	5.2; 8	7.9; 16	8.5; 0	**10.6**
CESOP–UCP	5 Jun 2011	28,762	26–30; 67/77	**37–42**; 104/114	11–14; 22/28	5–7; 8/11	7–9; 14/18	5–8; 0/1	11–12
Eurosondagem	5 Jun 2011	42,712	25.5– 29.7; 69/77	**38.3–** **42.5**; 102/109	11.1– 13.9; 22/25	4.5– 6.7; 7/10	6.8– 9.0; 15/16	–	12.8
Intercampus	5 Jun 2011	29,636	24.4– 28.8; 64/78	**37.7–** **42.5**; 107/121	10.1– 13.7; 12/28	3.8– 7.0; 4/12	6.2– 9.4; 11/20	6.6– 9.8; 0/1	13.3– 13.7
Eurosondagem	2 Jun 2011	520	31.0	**35.5**	13.0	6.3	8.2	6.0	4.5
Aximage	31 May–2 Jun 2011	968	29.2	**37.4**	12.5	6.7	8.0	6.2	8.2
Eurosondagem	1 Jun 2011	507	31.1; 80/83	**35.9**; 91/96	13.0; 25/28	5.9; 8/10	7.8; 15/16	6.3; 0	4.8
Aximage	29 May–1 Jun 2011	1,200	30.1	**36.3**	12.4	6.6	8.1	6.5	6.2
Intercampus	28 May–1 Jun 2011	1,026	31.1	**36.5**	11.6	6.0	7.4	7.3	5.4
Eurosondagem	31 May 2011	503	31.3	**35.4**	13.4	6.0	7.9	6.0	4.1
Marktest	28–31 May 2011	1,208	30.1	**38.5**	9.7	4.5	8.5	8.7	8.4
Eurosondagem	30 May 2011	522	32.2	**35.5**	12.6	6.3	7.6	5.8	3.3
CESOP–UCP	28–29 May 2011	3,963	31; 78/88	**36**; 95/106	11; 20/24	7; 10/14	8; 14/16	7; 0	5
Eurosondagem	29 May 2011	505	32.1	**34.7**	12.9	6.3	7.7	6.3	2.6
Intercampus	25–29 May 2011	1,010	32.3	**37.0**	12.7	5.2	7.7	5.2	4.7
Eurosondagem	27 May 2011	521	32.4	**33.7**	13.2	6.4	7.8	6.5	1.3
Eurosondagem	26 May 2011	511	32.3	**33.9**	13.4	6.3	7.9	6.2	1.6
Intercampus	21–26 May 2011	1,015	34.1	**35.8**	11.3	6.5	7.7	4.5	1.7
Eurosondagem	25 May 2011	515	32.5	**33.6**	12.8	6.5	8.1	6.5	1.1
Eurosondagem	24 May 2011	510	32.0	**33.7**	13.2	6.7	8.1	6.7	1.7
Eurosondagem	23 May 2011	525	32.6	**33.1**	13.7	6.6	7.6	6.4	0.5
CESOP–UCP	21–22 May 2011	1,490	**36**	**36**	10	6	9	3	Tie
Intercampus	18–22 May 2011	1,024	33.2	**39.6**	12.1	5.6	6.6	3.0	6.4
Aximage	14–18 May 2011	750	29.5	**31.1**	12.9	5.2	7.3	14.0	1.6
Intercampus	11–15 May 2011	1,025	35.4	**36.1**	12.6	6.2	7.5	2.2	0.7
Intercampus	7–12 May 2011	1,029	**36.8**	33.9	13.4	6.0	7.4	2.4	2.9
Marktest	9–10 May 2011	805	33.4	**39.7**	9.0	4.8	6.5	6.6	6.3
Intercampus	4–8 May 2011	1,020	35.1	**36.2**	10.9	6.5	7.7	3.6	1.1
Intercampus	2–5 May 2011	1,009	34.8	**37.0**	10.5	7.0	7.9	2.8	2.2
Eurosondagem	28 Apr–3 May 2011	2,048	32.5	**35.8**	11.1	6.6	7.7	6.3	3.3
Aximage	29 Apr–2 May 2011	600	28.3	**31.5**	11.2	7.7	9.3	12.0	3.2
CESOP–UCP	30 Apr–1 May 2011	1,370	**36**	34	10	5	9	6	2
Eurosondagem	14–19 Apr 2011	1,025	32.7	**36.3**	11.3	6.9	7.8	5.0	3.6
Marktest	15–17 Apr 2011	805	**36.1**	35.3	7.5	6.0	8.1	7.0	0.8
Intercampus	8–10 Apr 2011	917	33.1	**38.7**	9.4	7.6	8.1	3.1	5.6
CESOP–UCP	2–3 Apr 2011	1,288	33	**39**	7	6	8	7	6
Aximage	28–30 Mar 2011	600	28.4	**34.8**	10.8	6.5	8.5	11.0	6.4
Eurosondagem	27–30 Mar 2011	1,021	30.4	**37.3**	10.7	7.7	8.4	5.5	6.9
Intercampus	24–26 Mar 2011	805	32.8	**42.2**	8.7	7.9	7.1	1.3	9.4
Marktest	18–23 Mar 2011	805	24.5	**46.7**	6.3	8.9	6.7	6.9	22.2
Aximage	3–7 Mar 2011	600	27.9	**37.9**	8.9	6.5	10.7	8.1	10.0
Eurosondagem	23–28 Feb 2011	1,021	30.6	**36.9**	9.9	7.7	8.6	6.3	6.3
Marktest	17–23 Feb 2011	797	29.1	**47.8**	4.2	5.9	6.1	6.9	18.7
Eurosondagem	3–8 Feb 2011	1,025	29.3	**36.3**	10.2	9.5	9.2	5.5	7.0
Aximage	1–3 Feb 2011	600	27.8	**37.8**	9.5	6.5	9.3	9.1	10.0
Eurosondagem	19–21 Jan 2011	1,548	30.3	**37.4**	9.6	9.3	8.4	5.0	7.1
Intercampus	16–19 Jan 2011	1,004	30.8	**36.8**	5.8	7.3	7.1	12.2	6.0
Eurosondagem	5–11 Jan 2011	1,010	29.6	**37.3**	10.1	9.0	8.8	5.2	7.7
Aximage	3–6 Jan 2011	600	25.4	**38.3**	8.8	7.5	9.9	10.1	12.9
Intercampus	10–15 Dec 2010	607	30.1	**41.6**	7.7	10.7	8.8	1.1	11.5
Aximage	5–7 Dec 2010	600	27.2	**39.8**	8.8	7.4	8.4	8.4	12.6
Eurosondagem	2–7 Dec 2010	1,020	30.3	**36.2**	9.6	9.3	8.4	6.2	5.9
Marktest	16–19 Nov 2010	804	26.9	**44.3**	6.9	8.7	6.7	6.5	17.4
Intercampus	12–17 Nov 2010	609	30.5	**39.2**	8.5	11.0	9.7	1.1	8.7
Eurosondagem	4–9 Nov 2010	1,025	30.0	**36.9**	9.3	9.2	8.8	5.8	6.9
Aximage	26–29 Oct 2010	600	26.5	**35.2**	9.1	8.4	9.8	11.0	8.7
CESOP–UCP	23–25 Oct 2010	1,140	26	**40**	7	12	8	7	14
Marktest	19–24 Oct 2010	807	25.1	**42.0**	8.1	9.8	8.3	6.7	16.9
Eurosondagem	6–12 Oct 2010	1,021	**35.3**	**35.3**	8.0	7.8	8.4	5.2	Tie
Intercampus	4–6 Oct 2010	609	32.0	**35.2**	9.1	10.6	11.1	2.0	3.2
Aximage	1–4 Oct 2010	600	**31.7**	30.6	10.2	8.6	7.6	11.3	1.1
Marktest	14–17 Sep 2010	804	35.7	**38.0**	6.7	6.5	6.5	6.6	2.3
Aximage	6–9 Sep 2010	600	**33.8**	32.1	7.9	8.3	8.6	9.3	1.7
Eurosondagem	1–7 Sep 2010	1,035	**36.0**	35.8	8.4	7.1	7.7	5.0	0.2
Eurosondagem	28 Jul–2 Aug 2010	1,031	35.0	**36.0**	9.0	7.2	8.0	4.8	1.0
Marktest	20–26 Jul 2010	802	33.3	**37.3**	7.5	8.5	6.8	6.6	4.0
Intercampus	16–19 Jul 2010	603	34.4	**39.2**	5.9	9.0	9.5	2.0	4.8
Euroexpansão	8–11 Jul 2010	1,504	31.7	**41.0**	3.8	6.5	6.3	10.7	9.3
Eurosondagem	1–6 Jul 2010	1,035	33.7	**36.2**	9.6	7.7	8.0	4.8	2.5
Aximage	1–4 Jul 2010	600	30.6	**34.9**	6.7	8.2	10.4	9.2	4.3
CESOP–UCP	19–21 Jun 2010	1,179	34	**37**	6	6	10	7	3
Marktest	15–20 Jun 2010	804	24.1	**47.7**	6.9	8.9	6.0	6.4	23.6
Eurosondagem	2–8 Jun 2010	1,025	34.8	**34.9**	10.1	7.7	7.5	5.0	0.1
Aximage	1–7 Jun 2010	600	30.5	**31.6**	7.4	9.7	9.9	10.9	1.1
Marktest	18–20 May 2010	804	27.6	**43.9**	7.5	7.7	7.1	6.2	16.3
Eurosondagem	13–18 May 2010	1,024	**36.2**	33.0	11.3	7.1	7.7	4.7	3.2
Aximage	4–7 May 2010	600	30.2	**31.5**	8.2	8.6	10.4	11.1	1.3
Intercampus	27–30 Apr 2010	803	35.8	**41.6**	5.8	7.8	7.8	1.2	5.8
Marktest	20–25 Apr 2010	800	34.0	**39.8**	4.5	8.3	7.2	6.2	5.8
Eurosondagem	8–13 Apr 2010	1,020	**36.0**	28.5	13.1	8.0	8.2	6.2	7.5
Aximage	5–8 Apr 2010	600	**32.2**	30.4	10.8	8.3	8.7	9.6	1.8
Marktest	16–21 Mar 2010	806	**35.6**	30.8	9.9	11.0	6.6	6.1	4.8
CESOP–UCP	6–9 Mar 2010	1,148	**41**	33	10	6	6	4	8
Aximage	5–9 Mar 2010	600	**34.0**	25.1	11.5	8.9	7.4	13.1	8.9
Eurosondagem	4–9 Mar 2010	1,019	**36.9**	26.2	14.8	8.8	8.4	4.9	10.7
Intercampus	23–27 Feb 2010	1,015	**40.4**	34.4	7.8	10.1	6.3	1.0	6.0
Marktest	16–21 Feb 2010	804	**35.9**	30.9	9.5	10.6	6.8	6.3	5.0
Aximage	10–13 Feb 2010	600	**32.4**	26.3	10.7	9.2	8.3	13.1	6.1
Eurosondagem	4–9 Feb 2010	1,025	**38.1**	26.9	13.6	8.4	8.3	4.7	11.2
Aximage	2–5 Feb 2010	600	**33.8**	24.8	12.1	8.6	8.7	12.0	9.0
Marktest	19–23 Jan 2010	803	**40.5**	29.2	10.2	5.5	8.5	6.1	11.3
Eurosondagem	7–12 Jan 2010	1,010	**38.0**	27.4	12.1	9.3	8.4	4.8	10.6
Aximage	6–11 Jan 2010	600	**33.4**	26.5	11.7	10.0	8.2	10.2	6.9
Aximage	7–10 Dec 2009	600	**32.5**	24.4	12.0	10.5	7.7	12.9	8.1
Eurosondagem	25 Nov–1 Dec 2009	1,031	**38.5**	26.9	12.7	9.2	7.7	5.0	11.6
Marktest	17–19 Nov 2009	808	**41.7**	25.6	12.1	8.0	6.5	6.1	16.1
Aximage	3–6 Nov 2009	600	**35.2**	27.3	10.3	8.8	7.8	10.6	7.9
Eurosondagem	29 Oct–3 Nov 2009	1,030	**38.8**	27.5	12.5	8.4	8.0	4.8	11.3
Marktest	20–24 Oct 2009	806	**42.9**	23.7	12.5	8.8	6.0	6.1	19.2
Aximage	12–16 Oct 2009	600	**35.3**	25.4	9.7	10.8	6.0	12.8	9.9
**2009 local elections**	11 Oct 2009	—N/a	37.7 (100)	**38.7** (102)	3.1 (2)	3.0 (4)	9.8 (22)	7.7 (0)	**1.0**
**2009 legislative election**	27 Sep 2009	—N/a	**36.6**; 97	29.1; 81	10.4; 21	9.8; 16	7.9; 15	6.2; 0	**7.5**

== Leadership polls ==
=== Preferred prime minister ===
Poll results showing public opinion on who would make the best prime minister are shown in the table below in reverse chronological order, showing the most recent first.

==== Sócrates vs Passos Coelho ====
Polling firm/Link	Fieldwork date	José Sócrates	Passos Coelho	Neither	Both	No opinion	Lead
Aximage	31 May–2 Jun 2011	24.3	39.6	25.8	—N/a	10.3	15.3
Aximage	29 Apr–2 May 2011	36.2	36.8	27.0			0.6
Aximage	28–30 Mar 2011	35.2	36.3	28.5			1.1
Aximage	3–7 Mar 2011	34.5	35.8	29.7			1.3
Aximage	1–3 Feb 2011	34.3	36.9	28.8			2.6
Aximage	3–6 Jan 2011	29.5	38.4	32.1			8.9
Aximage	5–7 Dec 2010	31.6	38.6	29.8			7.0
Aximage	26–29 Oct 2010	28.4	38.8	27.1	2.3	3.4	10.4
Aximage	1–4 Oct 2010	33.7	37.2	22.0	2.1	5.0	3.5
Aximage	6–9 Sep 2010	31.8	38.5	21.8	1.8	6.1	6.7
Aximage	1–4 Jul 2010	29.8	45.0	16.7	2.4	6.1	15.2
Aximage	1–7 Jun 2010	31.4	44.6	16.1	1.5	6.4	13.2
Aximage	4–7 May 2010	41.6	41.3	12.1	0.0	4.9	0.3
Aximage	5–8 Apr 2010	35.9	34.7	13.7	1.2	14.5	1.2

=== Cabinet approval/disapproval ratings ===
Poll results showing public opinion on the performance of the Government are shown in the table below in reverse chronological order, showing the most recent first.

Polling firm/Link	Fieldwork date	Sample size	José Sócrates' cabinet				
Polling firm/Link	Fieldwork date	Sample size	Approve	Disapprove	Neither	No opinion	Lead
CESOP–UCP	21–22 May 2011	1,490	19	77	—N/a	4	58
CESOP–UCP	30 Apr–1 May 2011	1,370	21	74	—N/a	5	53
Eurosondagem	27–30 Mar 2011	1,021	18.0	43.9	28.2	9.9	15.7
CESOP–UCP	2–3 Apr 2011	1,288	19	74	—N/a	7	55
Eurosondagem	23–28 Feb 2011	1,021	18.8	43.5	26.8	10.9	16.7
Eurosondagem	3–8 Feb 2011	1,025	18.0	44.2	27.0	10.8	17.2
Eurosondagem	5–11 Jan 2011	1,010	19.0	43.8	26.8	10.4	17.0
Eurosondagem	2–7 Dec 2010	1,032	19.4	42.0	29.4	9.2	12.6
Eurosondagem	4–9 Nov 2010	1,025	19.1	41.0	30.0	9.9	11.0
CESOP–UCP	23–25 Oct 2010	1,140	12	80	—N/a	8	68
Eurosondagem	6–12 Oct 2010	1,021	19.6	40.2	29.4	10.8	10.8
Eurosondagem	1–7 Sep 2010	1,035	21.4	39.6	28.3	10.7	11.3
Eurosondagem	28 Jun–2 Aug 2010	1,031	20.4	40.8	28.0	10.8	12.8
Eurosondagem	1–6 Jul 2010	1,035	21.3	40.6	27.5	10.6	13.1
CESOP–UCP	19–21 Jun 2010	1,179	20	72	—N/a	8	52
Eurosondagem	2–8 Jun 2010	1,025	21.5	40.0	28.7	9.8	11.3
Eurosondagem	13–18 May 2010	1,024	21.7	39.1	28.5	10.7	10.6
Eurosondagem	8–13 Apr 2010	1,020	23.1	38.8	26.3	11.8	12.5
CESOP–UCP	6–9 Mar 2010	1,148	28	64	—N/a	8	36
Eurosondagem	4–9 Mar 2010	1,019	24.3	37.7	27.1	10.9	10.8
Eurosondagem	4–9 Feb 2010	1,025	21.7	39.0	26.5	12.8	12.5
Eurosondagem	7–12 Jan 2010	1,010	20.8	39.6	25.0	14.6	14.6
Eurosondagem	25 Nov–1 Dec 2009	1,031	19.4	39.8	27.6	13.2	12.2
