= Nuno Fazenda =

Portuguese politician (born 1976)

Member of the Assembly of the Republic
- Incumbent
- Assumed office 25 October 2019
- Constituency: Castelo Branco

Personal details
- Born: 24 October 1976 (age 49)
- Party: Socialist Party

Nuno Jorge Cardona Fazenda de Almeida (born 24 October 1976) is a Portuguese politician serving as a member of the Assembly of the Republic since 2019. From 2022 to 2024, he served as secretary of state for tourism, commerce and services.
