= Racism in Portugal =

Racism in Portugal has a long history, including the early modern persecution of Muslims and Jews and Portugal's involvement in the trade in enslaved people from West Africa.

Today in Portugal, the number of attacks against Afro-Portuguese people and Romani people from one year to the next is uneven and those attacks are not always promptly reported on the media and investigated by the police. Those two groups of people have also had a disproportionate representation in annual arrests, incarceration numbers and police reports across the country and throughout time.

There are several anti-racism organizations in the country supporting victims of racism and raising awareness about racism and ethnic discrimination issues. Social integration-focused organizations and programs targeting ethnic minorities or groups within some ethnic minorities with a track record of social issues including crime, poverty and youth delinquency, are also pervasive in Portugal. An anti-discrimination law was published on 28 August 1999. It prohibits discriminatory practices based on race, skin colour, nationality and ethnic origin. According to the Portuguese Constitution, further discriminatory practices based on sex, race, language, origin territory, religion, political and ideological convictions, instruction level, economic situation, social condition or sexual orientation are also prohibited.

== History ==
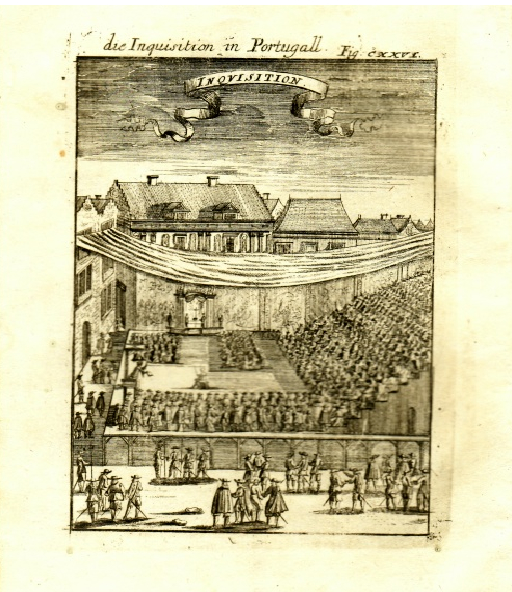
Copper engraving entitled "Die Inquisition in Portugall" (The Inquisition in Portugal), by Jean David Zunner from the work "Description de L'Univers, Contenant les Differents Systemes de Monde, Les Cartes Generales & Particulieres de la Geographie Ancienne & Moderne" by Alain Manesson Mallet, Frankfurt, 1685.

In the 8th century, Muslim armies sailed from North Africa and took control of Iberia. Known in Arabic as al-Andalus, the region joined the expanding Umayyad Empire and prospered under Muslim rule. However, dhimmi status led to continuing discrimination against Christians in those places.

Some Muslim Moors, mainly Arab and Berber people in origin, as well as Jews and Christian Mozarabs, were expelled out of the continent or fled from the reconquered territory, during the Catholic Reconquista and the expansion of the newly founded Kingdom of Portugal in the 12th and 13th centuries, after the conquest of the southern lands, including Lisbon, the Alentejo, and the Algarve. However, many adapted to the new Catholic rulers, often due to the coercive power of the ruling authority, and remained in the country mixing with the general population in every aspect of their lives. In Algarve and Lisbon, large swathes of Muslims of Arabic and Berber origin were assimilated into the general population of the Kingdom of Portugal during the process of Reconquista or in a few decades after its end. In several Portuguese regions such as Cova da Beira and Trás-os-Montes, Jews escaped the Portuguese Inquisition formally established in Portugal in 1536 and prospered as marranos and conversos, but many others across Portugal were persecuted, killed or forced to escape out of the Kingdom of Portugal.

The Atlantic slave trade started in 1444, when 235 people from the newly-discovered coast of West Africa where the Islamic slave trade had been established a long time ago were put up for sale in Lagos, currently a Portuguese beach resort on Europe's southwestern tip in Portugal's Algarve. Slavery would be abolished in Portugal in 1761 by the Marquês de Pombal. However, slavery within the African Portuguese colonies would only be fully abolished in 1869 due to that colonies' deep connections with the Brazilian slave trade.

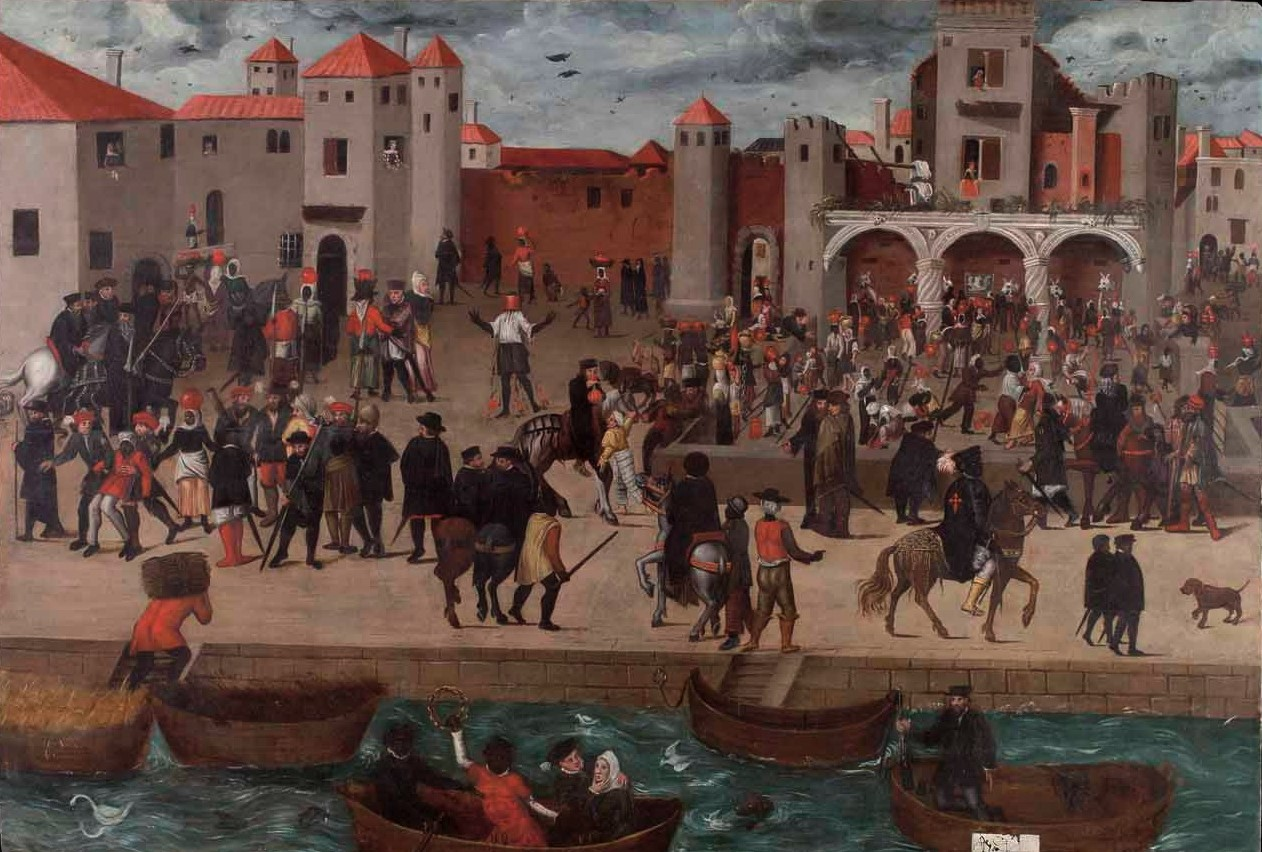
Lisbon in the 1570s had many black Africans among its population.

In the second half of the 16th century, at the end of the Portuguese Age of Discovery and close to the apogee of the transcontinental Portuguese Empire, Lisbon was full of black people of African extraction who lived freely and naturally among the white locals of European ancestry. There were also black servants and black slaves as well as black slave traders established in the Portuguese city.

In the 20th century, the Portuguese authorities would formally develop and promote the concept of Lusotropicalism. In light of this theory and official policy, Portugal's most notable sports star (Eusébio da Silva Ferreira) and the most decorated military officer of the Portuguese Armed Forces (Marcelino da Mata) under the Estado Novo regime (1933-1974) designed and led by António de Oliveira Salazar, were both black Portuguese citizens born and raised in Portugal's African territories. A large number of Portuguese military personnel employed during the Portuguese Colonial War (1961-1974) were also black African people.

Like the other countries of the Mediterranean, Portugal has witnessed a new phenomenon since the 1974 Carnation Revolution and the end of the Portuguese overseas empire: beyond the condition of country of emigration, it became at the same time a country of immigration. There was a very large flow of African immigrants, particularly coming from the former Portuguese colonies in Africa (collectively known as PALOP countries).

Immigration to Portugal before 1980 usually involved different groups (mainly Europeans and South Americans, in particular Brazilian immigrants), and a different socio-economic integration, than later immigrants.

The 1980s also saw racist attacks against certain immigrants by skinheads and the far-right National Action Movement, a fringe movement.

Since the 1990s, along with a boom in construction, several new waves of Brazilians, Romanians, and Moldovans have immigrated to Portugal. A number of British and Spanish people have also immigrated to Portugal, with the British community being mostly composed of retired pensioners and the Spaniards composed of professionals (medical doctors, business managers, businesspersons, nurses, etc.). Racism is usually related with ethnicity rather than nationality, with black people being the most common target, after Ciganos.

== National and ethnic groups ==
=== Romani ===
The Ciganos were the object of fierce discrimination and persecution. The number of Ciganos in Portugal is about 40,000 to 50,000 spread all over the country. The majority of the Ciganos concentrate themselves in urban centers, where from the late 1990s to the 2000s, major public housing (bairros sociais) policies were targeted at them in order to promote social integration. However, this population is still characterised by very low levels of educational qualification, high unemployment, and crime rates. The Ciganos are the ethnic group that the Portuguese most reject and discriminate against, and are also targets for discriminatory practices from the State administration, namely at a local level, finding persistent difficulties in the access to job placement, housing and social services, as well as in the relation to police forces. There are also reports on discrimination of Ciganos by owners of small shops in many parts of the country, including businesses run by other ethnic minorities, such as the Chinese.

Starting in the late 2010s, the agenda of CHEGA party and its founder André Ventura, which is heavily focused on criminality, support for the police forces, and the misuse of public money in terms of corruption at the top, overstaffing in the civil service at the middle or undeserving welfare recipients at the bottom, includes extensive references to the Portuguese Gypsies which are often explicitly targeted by the party and its founder in such a manner that a number of fines and admonitions have been issued to them by the Commission for Equality and Against Racial Discrimination (CICDR). André Ventura has defended himself explaining that he isn't racist but against subsidy dependence and criminality. He said about the topic that "structural racism is a ghost that does not exist in Portugal, a ghost that they want to bring into the discussion of issues or to hide others, as was the case of Novo Banco, as was the case of several cases of corruption that we have learned about in recent weeks".

=== Muslims ===
There has also been incidents of minor discrimination towards Muslims due to the history of modern Islamic terrorism in the Western World and some practices considered illiberal or grotesque by locals such as female genital mutilation.

=== Brazilians ===
The largest number of complaints about discrimination in Portugal come from Brazilians. According to a 2009 survey, 44% of the 64,000 Brazilians who were legally residing in Portugal had experienced some form of discrimination in the previous 12 months.

According to a 2007 survey, 71.9% of Brazilians living in Portugal reported having witnessed prejudice against Brazilians in the country. 45.3% said there was "a lot" of prejudice against Brazilians, and 26.6% said there was "some". Only 19.3% stated that there was "none". 34.5% of the Brazilian respondents said that they themselves were victims of prejudice by the Portuguese, and 65.3% said they never were. Among those who suffered prejudice, there were reports of greater difficulties in buying or renting a property, insults in the workplace, and differential treatment when they begin to speak and have their Brazilian accent noticed. Brazilian women are the ones who complain the most about prejudice in Portugal, as there is an association between Brazilian women and prostitution in the country. According to a study, there has been a process of "racialization" of Brazilian women in Portugal, in which biological (exuberant body, beauty) and behavioral (lack of modesty, sexual availability) stereotypes are attributed to them.

Almost 70% of Portuguese people believe that Brazilians have contributed to prostitution in Portugal, although the majority of Brazilian women living in the country are employed in the commerce, cleaning, and hotel sectors. 52.8% believe that, in general, Brazilians are not well-educated; they are not good professionals (68.7%), they are not competent and responsible (70%), and they are not serious and honest (74.3%). On the other hand, 74.7% of Portuguese people find Brazilians to be cheerful and good-natured; friendly and easy-going (63.2%).

Racism against Brazilians in Portugal is not directly linked to skin color or ethnicity, as stereotypes affect even those who are Portuguese-born. Therefore, there is a process of "racialization" of Brazilians in Portugal, not linked to the idea of skin color or ancestry, but to nationality, in which Brazilian women are seen as prostitutes and Brazilian men as thieves.

== Racism and the media ==
Portugal, as a new country of immigration since after the Carnation Revolution of 1974, has been witnessing the growing importance of all the issues related to the phenomena of racism and xenophobia. A typical feature is the positive complicity expressed and the accepted similarities between Africans and Portuguese as well as the absence of assumed and declared racist attitudes. Existing research has also made visible the role played by the mass media in the reproduction of discourses of antiracism, particularly when the press is dominated by some specific theme, as was the case regarding the European Year Against Racism. In this case, the issue of racism even deserved being commented by specialists in the different analysed newspapers.

== Notable incidents of racism ==
In an incident on February 5, 2015, eighteen police officers (PSP) tortured and beat a group of youths of African descent. The police officers originally lied about what had occurred, but a two-year investigation by the National Counterterrorism Unit (UNCT) and Public Ministry (MP) uncovered what had occurred. The MP concluded that the incident began with an arbitrary and violent arrest of a young man named Bruno Lopes in a suburb of Lisbon, Amadora. Despite not resisting arrest, he was subject to racial slurs, and was beaten violently. As a result, 6 individuals (including mediators of youth associations who act as informal liaisons between members of the community and police) went to inquire about the arrest status of Bruno Lopes. Unprovoked, the MP found that police brutally attacked the 6 individuals, and used a number of racial slurs. The attack included physical beatings as well as the individuals being shot with rubber bullets. One police officer was reported to have said, "They're all going to die, you f*cking blacks." The 6 individuals were then detained for two days, during which beatings and torture continued. Much of the torture was explicitly motivated by racial hatred. One officer was reported to have said "You do not know how I hate your race, I want to exterminate you all from this land, you have to deport yourself, and if I told you, you would all be sterilized." Another said, "You're going to disappear, you, your race and your shitty neighborhood!" The two days of beatings reportedly left blood all over the floor, which investigators reported observing as members of the police station attempted to clean up the floor "stained red". Originally, the internal inspection authority of the police had found no evidence of mistreatment, but the investigation by UNCT and MP demonstrated that this was categorically untrue.

As of September 7, 2017, it does not appear that any of the 18 officers have faced criminal justice for their actions. 4 of the 18 officers continue to work in the same police station. Others have left the station but it does not appear to be as a result of any penalty for their actions.

In March 2020, a Portuguese court found three border force officers guilty of fatally beating a Ukrainian man detained at Lisbon Airport, in a case that has led the government to break up the country’s immigration service (SEF). Ihor Homenyuk, 42, died two days after being held on arrival. He slowly suffocated after being left alone, face down on the floor with several broken ribs, his hands cuffed behind his back and legs taped together, said a doctor who carried out the autopsy.

== Racism in law enforcement ==
There have been suggestions of institutionalised racism within the Portuguese police force, with activists claiming that discrimination is the deep-rooted cause of police brutality in Portugal. In its 2015/2016 annual report on Portugal, Amnesty International condemned the excessive force used by police against migrant and minority communities.

Despite a good record in migrant integration, historical parallels can be drawn between Portugal's colonial past and modern police racism. According to activists, police have killed 14 young black men since 2001; however, no police officer has been held responsible for the deaths.

Racially-influenced police actions are illustrated by the violence in Cova de Moura, a low socio-economic area housing a significant migrant population. Notably, during an incident in February 2015, a young man named Bruno Lopes was aggressively searched and physically abused. When bystanders protested the excessive force, police responded by firing shotguns loaded with rubber bullets at the witnesses.

On the same day, two human rights workers and five youth entered the Alfragide police station requesting information on Lopes' situation. Upon arrival, the group was allegedly attacked by police officers shouting racist slurs. The policemen dragged and kept the young men in the police station, where they detained, mistreated, and mocked them for two days.

17 police officers from the Alfragide police station were eventually sent to trial on a variety of charges, including physical aggression, torture, document forging, and aggravated kidnapping. {{Update}} As of October 2018, the trial is ongoing, with victims being heard in court.

The European Commission against Racism and Intolerance (ECRI) has raised concerns about police mistreatment of minorities in Portugal in all of its reports on the country. In its fifth country report of 2018, ECRI mentions the Alfragide case in connection to the failure of IGAI (Inspeção-Geral da Administração Interna) or officers higher up in the chain of command to stop the abuses. IGAI is currently the body responsible for scrutinizing police activities in the country, but it is part of the Ministry of the Interior like the police forces. In its 2018 report, ECRI recommended that such work should be carried out by the country's Ombudsman, an equality body, or by a new and (entirely) independent body that can be created for that purpose.

Portuguese people of Roma descent have also been victims of police harassment and brutality in the country. There are several examples publicized by the media: one case from 2007 involved a Roma man and his son. The two walked to the Nelas police station in Porto to get some information, but the police allegedly ended up abusing them. Two officers were convicted in 2011 for physically assaulting the father.

An example of police brutality that occurred in 2012 is the night raid of a Roma campsite by the GNR (Guarda Nacional Republicana), in Cabanelas, Vila Verde. Some of the people living in the camp, including children and women, were reportedly attacked by GNR officers. Six Roma that were detained in the operation allege that they were later tortured and humiliated in the GNR station of Amares; the GNR denied the accusations, while SOS Racismo promised to file a complaint against the force. The last remnant of overt institutional racism, in Portugal, is article 81 of GNR's regulation law, which provides for an increased policing of nomadic people, who in general are known to be mostly Roma; the regulation's constitutionality was unsuccessfully challenged in the 1980s.

== Laws against racism ==
Law number 115 of 3 August 1999 introduced the legal recognition of immigrant associations as well as the technical and financial State support for the development of their activities. The High Commissioner gives this recognition for Immigrants and Ethnic Minorities to those associations that wish to be recognised as such, as long as they fulfil the appropriate conditions foreseen in the Law. These recognised associations may have the following rights: to participate in the definition of the immigrants policies; to participate in the legislative processes concerning immigration; to participate in the consultative bodies, in the terms defined by the law; to benefit from the right to public speech on the radio and television. Since the introduction of the law, already 25 immigrant associations have been legally recognised. The associations can be of national, regional or local scope, according to the number of members each association claims to have: that is, the number of associated members will determine if an association can be considered as being of local, regional or national range.

An anti-discrimination Law was published on 28 August 1999. It prohibits discriminatory practices based on 'race', colour, nationality and ethnic origin. Article I states that the objective of this law is to prevent and prohibit racial discrimination in all its forms and sanction all acts that violate a person's basic rights or impede the exercise of economic, social or cultural rights for reasons such as nationality, colour, 'race' or ethnic origin. This Law also provides for an Advisory Committee for Equality and Against Racial Discrimination. Presided by the High Commissioner for Immigrants and Ethnic Minorities, the Committee is responsible for promoting studies on equality and racial discrimination, supervising enforcement of the law, and making legislative proposals considered suitable for the prevention of all forms of discrimination. The law number 20, of 6 July 1996, introduced the possibility for immigrants, anti-racist and human rights associations to assist in a legal action against discrimination, together with the victim and the Prosecution, i.e. to formulate an accusation and to introduce evidence into the penal process.

== See also ==
- Environmental inequality in Europe
- Lusotropicalism
- Portuguese Inquisition
