= National Action Movement (Portugal) =

National Action Movement Movimento de Acção Nacional
- Abbreviation: MAN
- Founded: 1987; 39 years ago
- Dissolved: 1992; 34 years ago
- Succeeded by: National Renewal Party
- Ideology: Neo-fascism; White nationalism Xenophobia; Third Position
- Political position: Far-right

Movimento de Acção Nacional (National Action Movement or MAN) was a short-lived nationalist organisation in Portugal.

Formed in 1984, the group originated in the Lisbon suburb of Amadora and had a largely youthful membership. Ideologically it rejected liberal democracy, party politics, communism and capitalism and took an ethnic nationalist view, calling for the defence of the Portuguese "race" against immigration and miscegenation. It produced two main journals, Accao and Ofensiva, as well as other more sporadic works that were designed to specifically appeal to members of the skinhead movement, which had become an underground fashion in Portugal around 1987.

Although it was avowedly a cultural organisation the MAN soon developed close links with the country's white power skinhead movement and became associated with street violence against immigrants. The violence culminated in the assassination of a Trotskyist activist for which a number of members were brought to trial in 1992 (although those sympathetic to the group claimed that the death had been as a result of a fight between Trotskyists and MAN supporters). Whilst this trial was on-going MAN officially disbanded but nonetheless the leaders of the group were brought to trial at the Portuguese Constitutional Court for forming a group that espoused 'Fascist ideology', which had been banned by the Constitution of Portugal. The trial attracted much mainstream media attention as it was the first case that the Constitutional Court had heard publicly but ultimately it was unable to pass a judgement as the movement had already disbanded.

Pedrito Grilo was ultimately jailed for 12 years for the murder, a stabbing of activist José Carvalho in Rua da Palma, although he escaped from prison after serving four months.

Although the group had officially ceased to exist, several members went on to join the National Alliance, which was formed in 1995. On its own this group made little impact, although in 1999 it was able to take control of the old Democratic Renovator Party and reconstitute it as the National Renewal Party.
