= Carlos Robalo =

Portuguese politician

Carlos Robalo (died April 24, 2008) was a Portuguese politician and a member of the CDS – People's Party. Robalo served as Portugal's Secretary of State in 1980 and 1981 He was also instrumental in the creation of the Entidade Reguladora do Sector Eléctrico (ERSE).

Carlos Robalo died on April 24, 2008, at the age of 76 at a hospital in Tomar, Portugal.
