= Faro (Assembly of the Republic constituency) =

Constituency of the Assembly of the Republic, the national legislature of Portugal

- Constituency for the Assembly of the Republic
- Location of Faro within Portugal
- District: Faro
- Population: 492,747 (2024)
- Electorate: 383,944 (2025)
- Area: 4,997 km^{2} (2024)

Current Constituency
- Created: 1976
- Seats: List: 9 (2011–present); 8 (1991–2011); 9 (1976–1991)
- Deputies: List: Bárbara do Amaral Correia (PSD); João Paulo Graça (CH); Luís Graça (PS); Vítor Guerreiro (PS); Ricardo Moreira (CH); Cristóvão Norte (PSD); Pedro Pinto (CH); Sandra Ribeiro (CH); Miguel Santos (PSD)

Faro is one of the 22 multi-member constituencies of the Assembly of the Republic, the national legislature of Portugal. The constituency was established in 1976 when the Assembly of the Republic was established by the constitution following the restoration of democracy. It is conterminous with the district of Faro. The constituency currently elects nine of the 230 members of the Assembly of the Republic using the closed party-list proportional representation electoral system. At the 2025 legislative election it had 383,944 registered electors.

== Electoral system ==
Faro currently elects nine of the 230 members of the Assembly of the Republic using the closed party-list proportional representation electoral system. Seats are allocated using the D'Hondt method.

== Election results ==
=== Summary ===
Election	Unitary Democrats CDU / APU / PCP			Left Bloc BE / UDP			LIVRE L			Socialists PS / FRS			People Animals Nature PAN			Democratic Renewal PRD			Social Democrats PSD / PàF / AD / PPD			Liberals IL			CDS – People's CDS–PP / CDS			Chega CH / PPV/CDC / PPV		
Election	Votes	%	Seats	Votes	%	Seats	Votes	%	Seats	Votes	%	Seats	Votes	%	Seats	Votes	%	Seats	Votes	%	Seats	Votes	%	Seats	Votes	%	Seats	Votes	%	Seats
2025	6,172	2.74%	0	5,732	2.54%	0	7,735	3.43%	0	47,321	21.00%	2	4,166	1.85%	0				59,380	26.35%	3	10,056	4.46%	0				78,135	34.67%	4
2024	7,488	3.27%	0	13,555	5.91%	0	6,492	2.83%	0	59,856	26.10%	3	6,092	2.66%	0				52,681	22.97%	3	10,736	4.68%	0				64,081	27.95%	3
2022	9,385	4.92%	0	11,209	5.88%	0	2,122	1.11%	0	77,763	40.80%	5	4,214	2.21%	0				47,479	24.91%	3	9,045	4.75%	0	2,111	1.11%	0	24,000	12.59%	1
2019	11,719	7.43%	0	20,241	12.83%	1	1,625	1.03%	0	60,828	38.55%	5	7,856	4.98%	0				37,036	23.47%	3	1,358	0.86%	0	6,307	4.00%	0	3,513	2.23%	0
2015	16,541	9.03%	1	26,926	14.70%	1	1,436	0.78%	0	62,425	34.08%	4	3,783	2.07%	0				59,957	32.73%	3									
2011	17,255	9.00%	1	16,347	8.53%	1				46,082	24.04%	2	3,285	1.71%	0				74,304	38.76%	4				25,441	13.27%	1	640	0.33%	0
2009	15,672	8.07%	0	30,888	15.91%	1				64,205	33.07%	3							52,728	27.16%	3				21,611	11.13%	1	841	0.43%	0
2005	13,835	7.16%	0	15,316	7.93%	0				98,570	51.05%	6							49,101	25.43%	2				11,537	5.97%	0			
2002	11,696	6.43%	0	5,168	2.84%	0				75,468	41.51%	4							70,236	38.63%	4				15,539	8.55%	0			
1999	14,890	8.47%	0	4,129	2.35%	0				87,239	49.62%	5							53,153	30.24%	3				13,091	7.45%	0			
1995	15,487	7.98%	0	1,292	0.67%	0				98,323	50.69%	5							57,929	29.86%	3				16,497	8.50%	0			
1991	13,979	7.35%	0							60,770	31.94%	3				1,911	1.00%	0	98,867	51.97%	5				5,435	2.86%	0			
1987	20,683	11.23%	1	1,962	1.07%	0				47,218	25.65%	3				11,926	6.48%	0	88,442	48.04%	5				5,910	3.21%	0			
1985	30,446	15.85%	2	3,157	1.64%	0				44,180	23.00%	2				40,689	21.18%	2	56,238	29.27%	3				12,146	6.32%	0			
1983	36,141	19.22%	2	2,272	1.21%	0				83,718	44.53%	5							44,758	23.81%	2				14,428	7.67%	0			
1980	34,486	17.26%	1	3,869	1.94%	0				71,588	35.83%	4							76,769	38.43%	4									
1979	41,724	21.00%	2	6,528	3.29%	0				70,069	35.27%	3							71,232	35.86%	4									
1976	27,667	15.37%	1	4,928	2.74%	0				85,313	47.39%	6							36,906	20.50%	2				13,010	7.23%	0			

(Figures in italics represent alliances.)

=== Detailed ===
==== 2020s ====
===== 2025 =====
Results of the 2025 legislative election held on 18 May 2025:

Party		Votes	%	Seats
Chega	CH	78,135	34.67%	4
Democratic Alliance	AD	59,380	26.35%	3
Socialist Party	PS	47,321	21.00%	2
Liberal Initiative	IL	10,056	4.46%	0
LIVRE	L	7,735	3.43%	0
Unitary Democratic Coalition	CDU	6,172	2.74%	0
Left Bloc	BE	5,732	2.54%	0
National Democratic Alternative	ADN	4,190	1.86%	0
People Animals Nature	PAN	4,166	1.85%	0
React, Include, Recycle	RIR	512	0.23%	0
Ergue-te	E	486	0.22%	0
Volt Portugal	Volt	437	0.19%	0
New Right	ND	425	0.19%	0
People's Monarchist Party	PPM	332	0.15%	0
Together for the People	JPP	264	0.12%	0
Valid votes		225,343	100.00%	9
Blank votes		3,252	1.41%	
Rejected votes – other		1,834	0.80%	
Total polled		230,429	60.02%	
Registered electors		383,944		

The following candidates were elected:: Jorge Botelho (PS); Maria da Graça Carvalho (AD); Bárbara do Amaral Correia (AD); João Paulo Graça (CH); Jamila Madeira (PS); Ricardo Moreira (CH); Cristóvão Norte (AD); Pedro Pinto (CH); and Sandra Ribeiro (CH).

===== 2024 =====
Results of the 2024 legislative election held on 10 March 2024:

Party		Votes	%	Seats
Chega	CH	64,081	27.95%	3
Socialist Party	PS	59,856	26.10%	3
Democratic Alliance	AD	52,681	22.97%	3
Left Bloc	BE	13,555	5.91%	0
Liberal Initiative	IL	10,736	4.68%	0
Unitary Democratic Coalition	CDU	7,488	3.27%	0
LIVRE	L	6,492	2.83%	0
People Animals Nature	PAN	6,092	2.66%	0
National Democratic Alternative	ADN	4,924	2.15%	0
React, Include, Recycle	RIR	1,073	0.47%	0
New Right	ND	782	0.34%	0
Together for the People	JPP	623	0.27%	0
Volt Portugal	Volt	587	0.26%	0
Ergue-te	E	330	0.14%	0
Valid votes		229,300	100.00%	9
Blank votes		3,401	1.45%	
Rejected votes – other		2,650	1.13%	
Total polled		235,351	61.75%	
Registered electors		381,108		

The following candidates were elected: Jorge Botelho (PS); João Paulo Graça (CH); Luís Graça (PS); Miguel Pinto Luz (AD); Jamila Madeira (PS); Cristóvão Norte (AD); Pedro Pinto (CH); Ofélia Ramos (AD); and Sandra Ribeiro (CH).

===== 2022 =====
Results of the 2022 legislative election held on 30 January 2022:

Party		Votes	%	Seats
Socialist Party	PS	77,763	40.80%	5
Social Democratic Party	PSD	47,479	24.91%	3
Chega	CH	24,000	12.59%	1
Left Bloc	BE	11,209	5.88%	0
Unitary Democratic Coalition	CDU	9,385	4.92%	0
Liberal Initiative	IL	9,045	4.75%	0
People Animals Nature	PAN	4,214	2.21%	0
LIVRE	L	2,122	1.11%	0
CDS – People's Party	CDS–PP	2,111	1.11%	0
National Democratic Alternative	ADN	1,157	0.61%	0
React, Include, Recycle	RIR	759	0.40%	0
Earth Party	PT	383	0.20%	0
Socialist Alternative Movement	MAS	287	0.15%	0
Portuguese Labour Party	PTP	250	0.13%	0
Ergue-te	E	220	0.12%	0
Volt Portugal	Volt	210	0.11%	0
Valid votes		190,594	100.00%	9
Blank votes		2,598	1.33%	
Rejected votes – other		1,760	0.90%	
Total polled		194,952	51.25%	
Registered electors		380,371		

The following candidates were elected: Jorge Botelho (PS); Rui Cristina (PSD); Luís Gomes (PSD); Luís Graça (PS); Isabel Guerreiro (PS); Jamila Madeira (PS); Francisco Pereira de Oliveira (PS); Pedro Pinto (CH); and Ofélia Ramos (PSD).

==== 2010s ====
===== 2019 =====
Results of the 2019 legislative election held on 6 October 2019:

Party		Votes	%	Seats
Socialist Party	PS	60,828	38.55%	5
Social Democratic Party	PSD	37,036	23.47%	3
Left Bloc	BE	20,241	12.83%	1
Unitary Democratic Coalition	CDU	11,719	7.43%	0
People Animals Nature	PAN	7,856	4.98%	0
CDS – People's Party	CDS–PP	6,307	4.00%	0
Chega	CH	3,513	2.23%	0
LIVRE	L	1,625	1.03%	0
Portuguese Workers' Communist Party	PCTP	1,440	0.91%	0
Liberal Initiative	IL	1,358	0.86%	0
Alliance	A	1,253	0.79%	0
React, Include, Recycle	RIR	998	0.63%	0
Earth Party	PT	698	0.44%	0
We, the Citizens!	NC	698	0.44%	0
National Renewal Party	PNR	690	0.44%	0
United Party of Retirees and Pensioners	PURP	472	0.30%	0
People's Monarchist Party	PPM	387	0.25%	0
Portuguese Labour Party	PTP	345	0.22%	0
Democratic Republican Party	PDR	336	0.21%	0
Valid votes		157,800	100.00%	9
Blank votes		4,717	2.85%	
Rejected votes – other		2,860	1.73%	
Total polled		165,377	45.92%	
Registered electors		360,169		

The following candidates were elected: José Apolinário (PS); Jorge Botelho (PS); Rui Cristina (PSD); Luís Graça (PS); Jamila Madeira (PS); Maria Joaquina Matos (PS); Cristóvão Norte (PSD); Ofélia Ramos (PSD); and João Vasconcelos (BE).

===== 2015 =====
Results of the 2015 legislative election held on 4 October 2015:

Party		Votes	%	Seats
Socialist Party	PS	62,425	34.08%	4
Portugal Ahead	PàF	59,957	32.73%	3
Left Bloc	BE	26,926	14.70%	1
Unitary Democratic Coalition	CDU	16,541	9.03%	1
People Animals Nature	PAN	3,783	2.07%	0
Portuguese Workers' Communist Party	PCTP	3,011	1.64%	0
Democratic Republican Party	PDR	2,323	1.27%	0
LIVRE	L	1,436	0.78%	0
National Renewal Party	PNR	1,343	0.73%	0
We, the Citizens!	NC	1,337	0.73%	0
The Earth Party Movement	MPT	1,222	0.67%	0
ACT! (Portuguese Labour Party and Socialist Alternative Movement)	AGIR	1,220	0.67%	0
United Party of Retirees and Pensioners	PURP	886	0.48%	0
People's Monarchist Party	PPM	755	0.41%	0
Valid votes		183,165	100.00%	9
Blank votes		4,278	2.25%	
Rejected votes – other		3,038	1.59%	
Total polled		190,481	51.46%	
Registered electors		370,189		

The following candidates were elected: José Apolinário (PS); José Carlos Barros (PàF); Teresa Caeiro (PàF); António Eusébio (PS); Luís Graça (PS); Jamila Madeira (PS); Cristóvão Norte (PàF); Paulo Sá (CDU); and João Vasconcelos (BE).

===== 2011 =====
Results of the 2011 legislative election held on 5 June 2011:

Party		Votes	%	Seats
Social Democratic Party	PSD	74,304	38.76%	4
Socialist Party	PS	46,082	24.04%	2
CDS – People's Party	CDS–PP	25,441	13.27%	1
Unitary Democratic Coalition	CDU	17,255	9.00%	1
Left Bloc	BE	16,347	8.53%	1
Party for Animals and Nature	PAN	3,285	1.71%	0
Portuguese Workers' Communist Party	PCTP	3,160	1.65%	0
The Earth Party Movement	MPT	2,076	1.08%	0
Hope for Portugal Movement	MEP	1,083	0.56%	0
National Renewal Party	PNR	1,069	0.56%	0
People's Monarchist Party	PPM	700	0.37%	0
Pro-Life Party	PPV	640	0.33%	0
Workers' Party of Socialist Unity	POUS	263	0.14%	0
Valid votes		191,705	100.00%	9
Blank votes		6,026	3.00%	
Rejected votes – other		2,903	1.45%	
Total polled		200,634	55.81%	
Registered electors		359,505		

The following candidates were elected: Mendes Bota (PSD); Elsa Cordeiro (PSD); Miguel Freitas (PS); Cecília Honório (BE); Cristóvão Norte (PSD); Artur Rêgo (CDS-PP); Pedro Roque (PSD); Paulo Sá (CDU); and João Soares (PS).

==== 2000s ====
===== 2009 =====
Results of the 2009 legislative election held on 27 September 2009:

Party		Votes	%	Seats
Socialist Party	PS	64,205	33.07%	3
Social Democratic Party	PSD	52,728	27.16%	3
Left Bloc	BE	30,888	15.91%	1
CDS – People's Party	CDS–PP	21,611	11.13%	1
Unitary Democratic Coalition	CDU	15,672	8.07%	0
Portuguese Workers' Communist Party	PCTP	2,802	1.44%	0
People's Monarchist Party	PPM	949	0.49%	0
Hope for Portugal Movement	MEP	943	0.49%	0
New Democracy Party	ND	874	0.45%	0
National Renewal Party	PNR	872	0.45%	0
Pro-Life Party	PPV	841	0.43%	0
The Earth Party Movement and Humanist Party	MPT-PH	772	0.40%	0
Merit and Society Movement	MMS	584	0.30%	0
Workers' Party of Socialist Unity	POUS	419	0.22%	0
Valid votes		194,160	100.00%	8
Blank votes		4,662	2.31%	
Rejected votes – other		2,723	1.35%	
Total polled		201,545	57.36%	
Registered electors		351,369		

The following candidates were elected: Mendes Bota (PSD); Miguel Freitas (PS); Isilda Gomes (PS); Jorge Bacelar Gouveia (PSD); Antonieta Guerreiro (PSD); Cecília Honório (BE); Artur Rêgo (CDS-PP); and João Soares (PS).

===== 2005 =====
Results of the 2005 legislative election held on 20 February 2005:

Party		Votes	%	Seats
Socialist Party	PS	98,570	51.05%	6
Social Democratic Party	PSD	49,101	25.43%	2
Left Bloc	BE	15,316	7.93%	0
Unitary Democratic Coalition	CDU	13,835	7.16%	0
CDS – People's Party	CDS–PP	11,537	5.97%	0
Portuguese Workers' Communist Party	PCTP	1,720	0.89%	0
New Democracy Party	ND	1,567	0.81%	0
Humanist Party	PH	947	0.49%	0
National Renewal Party	PNR	503	0.26%	0
Valid votes		193,096	100.00%	8
Blank votes		4,116	2.06%	
Rejected votes – other		2,557	1.28%	
Total polled		199,769	61.62%	
Registered electors		324,193		

The following candidates were elected: José Apolinário (PS); Mendes Bota (PSD); Luís Carito (PS); José Pereira da Costa (PSD); João Cravinho (PS); Miguel Freitas (PS); Jovita Ladeira (PS); and Aldemira Pinho (PS).

===== 2002 =====
Results of the 2002 legislative election held on 17 March 2002:

Party		Votes	%	Seats
Socialist Party	PS	75,468	41.51%	4
Social Democratic Party	PSD	70,236	38.63%	4
CDS – People's Party	CDS–PP	15,539	8.55%	0
Unitary Democratic Coalition	CDU	11,696	6.43%	0
Left Bloc	BE	5,168	2.84%	0
Portuguese Workers' Communist Party	PCTP	1,846	1.02%	0
People's Monarchist Party	PPM	708	0.39%	0
The Earth Party Movement	MPT	703	0.39%	0
Humanist Party	PH	445	0.24%	0
Valid votes		181,809	100.00%	8
Blank votes		2,491	1.34%	
Rejected votes – other		2,114	1.13%	
Total polled		186,414	58.61%	
Registered electors		318,058		

The following candidates were elected: Patinha Antão (PSD); José Apolinário (PS); Luís Carito (PS); Maria do Rosário Carneiro (PS); Natália Carrascalão (PSD); Jamila Madeira (PS); Carlos Martins (PSD); and Fernando Negrão (PSD).

==== 1990s ====
===== 1999 =====
Results of the 1999 legislative election held on 10 October 1999:

Party		Votes	%	Seats
Socialist Party	PS	87,239	49.62%	5
Social Democratic Party	PSD	53,153	30.24%	3
Unitary Democratic Coalition	CDU	14,890	8.47%	0
CDS – People's Party	CDS–PP	13,091	7.45%	0
Left Bloc	BE	4,129	2.35%	0
Portuguese Workers' Communist Party	PCTP	2,062	1.17%	0
The Earth Party Movement	MPT	1,233	0.70%	0
Valid votes		175,797	100.00%	8
Blank votes		2,494	1.38%	
Rejected votes – other		1,908	1.06%	
Total polled		180,199	57.44%	
Registered electors		313,728		

The following candidates were elected: Fialho Anastácio (PS); José Apolinário (PS); Luís Carito (PS); Jamila Madeira (PS); Carlos Martins (PSD); Luís Patrão (PS); David Santos (PSD); and Maria Isabel Silva Soares (PSD).

===== 1995 =====
Results of the 1995 legislative election held on 1 October 1995:

Party		Votes	%	Seats
Socialist Party	PS	98,323	50.69%	5
Social Democratic Party	PSD	57,929	29.86%	3
CDS – People's Party	CDS–PP	16,497	8.50%	0
Unitary Democratic Coalition	CDU	15,487	7.98%	0
Portuguese Workers' Communist Party	PCTP	1,727	0.89%	0
Popular Democratic Union	UDP	1,292	0.67%	0
Revolutionary Socialist Party	PSR	1,130	0.58%	0
The Earth Party Movement	MPT	813	0.42%	0
National Solidarity Party	PSN	786	0.41%	0
Valid votes		193,984	100.00%	8
Blank votes		1,975	1.00%	
Rejected votes – other		2,401	1.21%	
Total polled		198,360	64.19%	
Registered electors		309,018		

The following candidates were elected: Fialho Anastácio (PS); António Capucho (PSD); Martim Gracias (PS); Luís Filipe Madeira (PS); Cabrita Neto (PSD); Paulo Neves (PS); Maria do Carmo Romão (PS); and António Vairinhos (PSD).

===== 1991 =====
Results of the 1991 legislative election held on 6 October 1991:

Party		Votes	%	Seats
Social Democratic Party	PSD	98,867	51.97%	5
Socialist Party	PS	60,770	31.94%	3
Unitary Democratic Coalition	CDU	13,979	7.35%	0
Social Democratic Centre Party	CDS	5,435	2.86%	0
National Solidarity Party	PSN	4,298	2.26%	0
Revolutionary Socialist Party	PSR	2,268	1.19%	0
Democratic Renewal Party	PRD	1,911	1.00%	0
Portuguese Workers' Communist Party	PCTP	1,637	0.86%	0
People's Monarchist Party	PPM	1,079	0.57%	0
Valid votes		190,244	100.00%	8
Blank votes		2,045	1.05%	
Rejected votes – other		2,325	1.19%	
Total polled		194,614	66.36%	
Registered electors		293,280		

The following candidates were elected: Filipe Abreu (PSD); Fialho Anastácio (PS); José Apolinário (PS); Macário Correia (PSD); Luís Filipe Madeira (PS); Cabrita Neto (PSD); Fernando Faria de Oliveira (PSD); and António Vairinhos (PSD).

==== 1980s ====
===== 1987 =====
Results of the 1987 legislative election held on 19 July 1987:

Party		Votes	%	Seats
Social Democratic Party	PSD	88,442	48.04%	5
Socialist Party	PS	47,218	25.65%	3
Unitary Democratic Coalition	CDU	20,683	11.23%	1
Democratic Renewal Party	PRD	11,926	6.48%	0
Social Democratic Centre Party	CDS	5,910	3.21%	0
Portuguese Democratic Movement	MDP	2,148	1.17%	0
Popular Democratic Union	UDP	1,962	1.07%	0
Communist Party (Reconstructed)	PC(R)	1,380	0.75%	0
Revolutionary Socialist Party	PSR	1,347	0.73%	0
People's Monarchist Party	PPM	1,211	0.66%	0
Christian Democratic Party	PDC	1,024	0.56%	0
Portuguese Workers' Communist Party	PCTP	868	0.47%	0
Valid votes		184,119	100.00%	9
Blank votes		2,686	1.42%	
Rejected votes – other		2,718	1.43%	
Total polled		189,523	70.32%	
Registered electors		269,532		

The following candidates were elected: Filipe Abreu (PSD); José Apolinário (PS); Mendes Bota (PSD); Carlos Brito (CDU); António Capucho (PSD); António Esteves (PS); Luís Filipe Madeira (PS); Cristóvão Guerreiro Norte (PSD); and António Vairinhos (PSD).

===== 1985 =====
Results of the 1985 legislative election held on 6 October 1985:

Party		Votes	%	Seats
Social Democratic Party	PSD	56,238	29.27%	3
Socialist Party	PS	44,180	23.00%	2
Democratic Renewal Party	PRD	40,689	21.18%	2
United People Alliance	APU	30,446	15.85%	2
Social Democratic Centre Party	CDS	12,146	6.32%	0
Popular Democratic Union	UDP	3,157	1.64%	0
Revolutionary Socialist Party	PSR	1,407	0.73%	0
Christian Democratic Party	PDC	1,308	0.68%	0
Workers' Party of Socialist Unity	POUS	950	0.49%	0
Portuguese Workers' Communist Party	PCTP	898	0.47%	0
Communist Party (Reconstructed)	PC(R)	696	0.36%	0
Valid votes		192,115	100.00%	9
Blank votes		2,131	1.07%	
Rejected votes – other		4,069	2.05%	
Total polled		198,315	74.42%	
Registered electors		266,496		

The following candidates were elected: João Barros (PRD); Mendes Bota (PSD); Carlos Brito (APU); António Capucho (PSD); António Esteves (PS); António Feu (PRD); Luís Filipe Madeira (PS); Cabrita Neto (PSD); and Margarida Tengarrinha (APU).

===== 1983 =====
Results of the 1983 legislative election held on 25 April 1983:

Party		Votes	%	Seats
Socialist Party	PS	83,718	44.53%	5
Social Democratic Party	PSD	44,758	23.81%	2
United People Alliance	APU	36,141	19.22%	2
Social Democratic Centre Party	CDS	14,428	7.67%	0
Popular Democratic Union	UDP	2,272	1.21%	0
Christian Democratic Party	PDC	1,507	0.80%	0
Revolutionary Socialist Party	PSR	1,455	0.77%	0
Portuguese Workers' Communist Party	PCTP	1,175	0.63%	0
People's Monarchist Party	PPM	950	0.51%	0
Workers' Party of Socialist Unity	POUS	943	0.50%	0
Socialist Workers League	LST	646	0.34%	0
Valid votes		187,993	100.00%	9
Blank votes		1,805	0.93%	
Rejected votes – other		4,178	2.15%	
Total polled		193,976	76.99%	
Registered electors		251,947		

The following candidates were elected: Maria Barroso (PS); Carlos Brito (APU); Eurico Faustino Correia (PS); Carlos Luís Filipe Gracias (PS); Cristóvão Guerreiro Norte (PSD); César de Oliveira (PS); Luís Saias (PS); Margarida Tengarrinha (APU); and José Gago Vitorino (PSD).

===== 1980 =====
Results of the 1980 legislative election held on 5 October 1980:

Party		Votes	%	Seats
Democratic Alliance	AD	76,769	38.43%	4
Republican and Socialist Front	FRS	71,588	35.83%	4
United People Alliance	APU	34,486	17.26%	1
Workers' Party of Socialist Unity	POUS	4,577	2.29%	0
Popular Democratic Union	UDP	3,869	1.94%	0
Revolutionary Socialist Party	PSR	3,440	1.72%	0
Labour Party	PT	2,393	1.20%	0
Portuguese Workers' Communist Party	PCTP	2,043	1.02%	0
Christian Democratic Party, Independent Movement for the National Reconstruction / Party of the Portuguese Right and National Front	PDC- MIRN/ PDP- FN	623	0.31%	0
Valid votes		199,788	100.00%	9
Blank votes		1,594	0.77%	
Rejected votes – other		4,956	2.40%	
Total polled		206,338	83.30%	
Registered electors		247,707		

The following candidates were elected: Carlos Brito (APU); Júlio Carrapato (FRS); Miguel Anacoreta Correia (AD); António Esteves (FRS); Luís Filipe Madeira (FRS); Cabrita Neto (AD); Cristóvão Guerreiro Norte (AD); César de Oliveira (FRS); and José Gago Vitorino (AD).

==== 1970s ====
===== 1979 =====
Results of the 1979 legislative election held on 2 December 1979:

Party		Votes	%	Seats
Democratic Alliance	AD	71,232	35.86%	4
Socialist Party	PS	70,069	35.27%	3
United People Alliance	APU	41,724	21.00%	2
Popular Democratic Union	UDP	6,528	3.29%	0
Christian Democratic Party	PDC	2,761	1.39%	0
Left-wing Union for the Socialist Democracy	UEDS	2,357	1.19%	0
Portuguese Workers' Communist Party	PCTP	2,293	1.15%	0
Revolutionary Socialist Party	PSR	1,677	0.84%	0
Valid votes		198,641	100.00%	9
Blank votes		1,977	0.96%	
Rejected votes – other		5,335	2.59%	
Total polled		205,953	84.84%	
Registered electors		242,757		

The following candidates were elected: Luís Catarino (APU); António Esteves (PS); Artur Fernandes (AD); Luís Filipe Madeira (PS); Cabrita Neto (AD); Cristóvão Guerreiro Norte (AD); Luís Saias (PS); José Vitoriano (APU); and José Gago Vitorino (AD).

===== 1976 =====
Results of the 1976 legislative election held on 25 April 1976:

Party		Votes	%	Seats
Socialist Party	PS	85,313	47.39%	6
Democratic People's Party	PPD	36,906	20.50%	2
Portuguese Communist Party	PCP	27,667	15.37%	1
Social Democratic Centre Party	CDS	13,010	7.23%	0
Popular Democratic Union	UDP	4,928	2.74%	0
People's Socialist Front	FSP	3,839	2.13%	0
Re-Organized Movement of the Party of the Proletariat	MRPP	1,957	1.09%	0
Christian Democratic Party	PDC	1,493	0.83%	0
Movement of Socialist Left	MES	1,387	0.77%	0
Worker–Peasant Alliance	AOC	1,021	0.57%	0
People's Monarchist Party	PPM	966	0.54%	0
Communist Party of Portugal (Marxist–Leninist)	PCP(ML)	797	0.44%	0
Internationalist Communist League	LCI	743	0.41%	0
Valid votes		180,027	100.00%	9
Rejected votes		11,133	5.82%	
Total polled		191,160	80.75%	
Registered electors		236,744		

The following candidates were elected: Francisco Barracosa (PS); Pedro Coelho (PS); António Esteves (PS); Fernando Reis Luís (PS); Luís Filipe Madeira (PS); Eurico Neves Mendes (PS); Cristóvão Guerreiro Norte (PPD); José Vitoriano (PCP); and José Gago Vitorino (PPD).
