= Cecília Honório =

Portuguese politician and academic (born 1962)

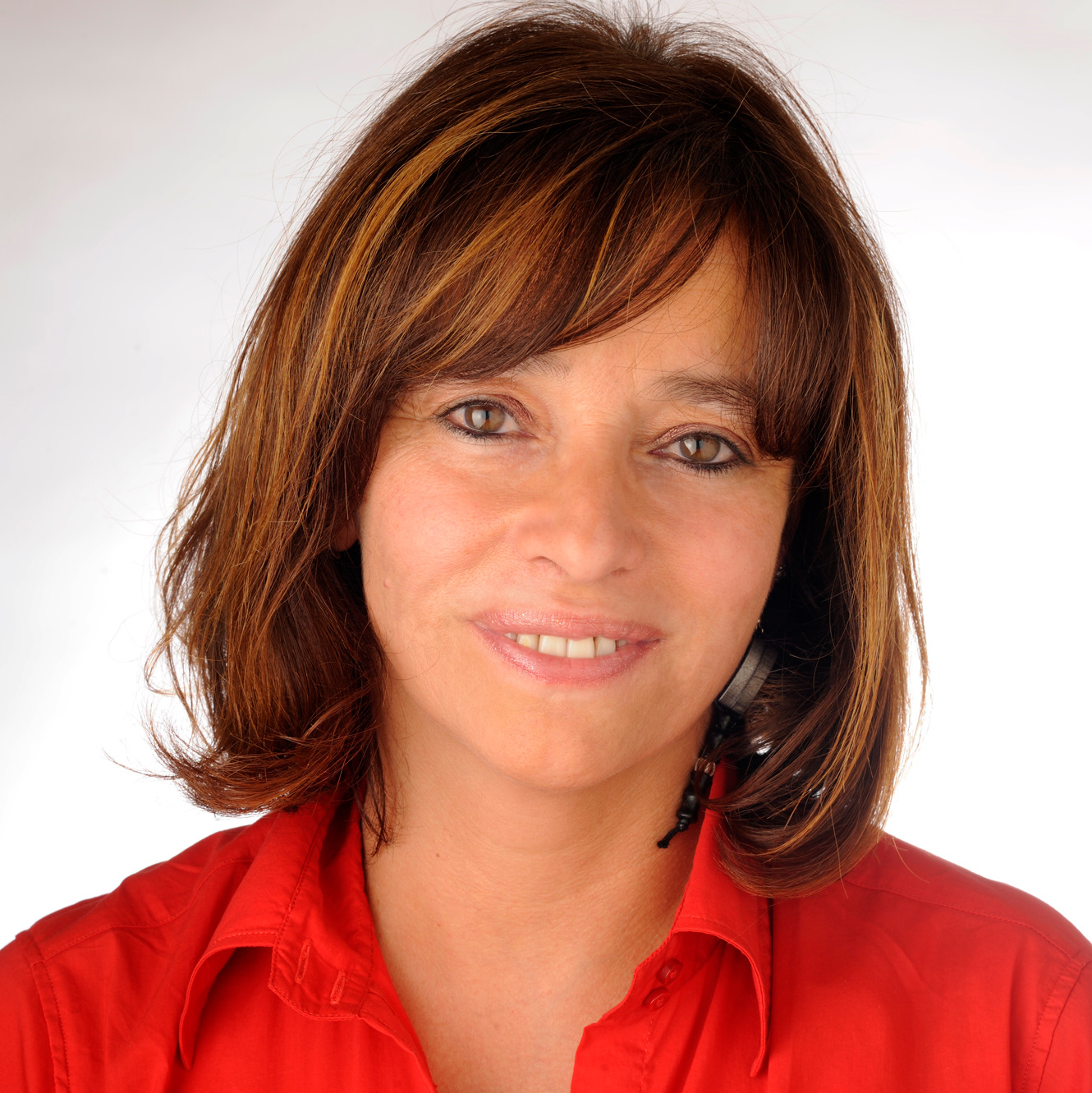
- Cecília Honório in 2009.

Member of the Assembly of the Republic of Portugal
- In office 10 March 2005 – 22 October 2015
- Constituency: Faro (2005–2011); Lisbon (2011–2015)

Personal details
- Born: 1 July 1962 (age 64) Parede, Portugal
- Party: Left Bloc
- Education: University of Lisbon; NOVA University of Lisbon
- Occupation: Historian, writer, politician, educator

Maria Cecília Vicente Duarte Honório (European Portuguese: [mɐˈɾi.ɐ sɨˈsi.ljɐ viˈsẽ.tɨ duˈaɾ.tɨ ɔˈnɔ.ɾju]; born 1 July 1962) is a Portuguese historian, writer, politician, and educator. She was a member Member of the Assembly of the Republic of Portugal from 10 March 2005 to 22 October 2015. Honório represented the constituency of Faro from 2005 to 2011, and Lisbon from 2011 to 2015. She is also a secondary school history teacher, and a historian researcher CHAM – Centre for the Humanities associated with the NOVA University of Lisbon and the University of the Azores. Honório also wrote several non-fiction history books, and co-created the 2022 documentary film Novíssimas Cartas Portuguesas together with Paula Miranda and Irina Pampim.

== Biography ==
Cecília Honório was born on 1 July 1962 in the town of Parede in the Lisbon District, Portugal. She graduated from the University of Lisbon in 1984 with a bachelor's degree in history, and from the NOVA University of Lisbon with a master's degree in cultural and political history in 1993. In 2003, Honório received a doctorate in history and theory of ideas from the NOVA University of Lisbon. In 1984, she begun working as a secondary school history teacher. Honório is also a historian researcher at the CHAM – Centre for the Humanities associated with the NOVA University of Lisbon and the University of the Azores. Her research interests include the history of political thought in the 18th, 19th, and 20th centuries, the rise of populism in the late 20th century, and the history of women in politics. She wrote and co-wrote non-fiction history books, including Manuel Fernandes Tomás (1711–1822) (2009), Donos de Portugal. Cem Anos de Poder Económico (1910–2010) (2010), A Natureza e o Homem nos caminhos do Saber e do Poder – Francisco de Borja Garção Stockler (1759–1829) (2012), Mulheres contra a Ditadura – MUD Juvenil (1946–1957) (2013), and Mulheres, Terra e Revolução: O 25 de Abril visto pelas mulheres rurais (2026).

Together with Paula Miranda and Irina Pampim, Honório co-created the 2022 documentary film Novíssimas Cartas Portuguesas. It covers the 1972 literary work New Portuguese Letters composed of letters, essays, poems, fragments, puzzles and excerpts from legal documents, published jointly by the Maria Isabel Barreno, Maria Teresa Horta and Maria Velho da Costa in 1972. Its publication revealed to the world the existence of acute discriminatory conditions in Portugal under the Estado Novo regime, including dictatorial repression and the status of women regarding marriage, motherhood, and sexuality. The film received the Best Documentary Award, the Women's Struggles and Rights Award, and the Women's Voice Award at the Porto Femme International Film Festival in 2023.

Honório belongs to the Left Bloc party. She was chosen to the Assembly of the Republic of Portugal in the 2005 election, representing the constituency of Faro, consisting of the Faro District. Honório was reelected in 2009 and 2011. During the latter election, she run from the constituency of Lisbon, consisting of the Lisbon District. In the assembly, Honório was a member of the Constitutional Affairs, Rights, Freedoms and Guarantees Committee, and the Ethics, Citizenship and Communication Committee. From 2018 to 2021, she was a policy adviser of the Lisbon Municipal Chamber.

In 2013, Honório unsuccessfully run for a seat in the Cascais Municipal Chamber. She was simultaneously placed first on the Left Bloc electoral list, making her a candidate for the office of the mayor of Cascais.

== Publications ==
=== Books ===
Title	Publication date	Publisher	ISBN	Notes
Manuel Fernandes Tomás (1711–1822)	2009	Assembly of the Republic, Texto Editores	9789724739304	Non-fiction literature
Donos de Portugal. Cem Anos de Poder Económico (1910–2010)	2010	Afrontamento	9789723611168	Non-fiction literature; co-written with Jorge Costa, Luís Fazenda, and Francisco Louçã
A Natureza e o Homem nos caminhos do Saber e do Poder. Francisco de Borja Garção Stockler (1759–1829)	2012	Imprensa Nacional Casa da Moeda	9789722719834	Non-fiction literature
Gaiola de Fantasmas	2012	Bertrand	9789722524322	Non-fiction literature
Representações da República	2013	Húmus	9789897550065	Non-fiction literature; chapter: "Ideação Romântica e República no Liberalismo Português"
Mulheres contra a Ditadura – MUD Juvenil (1946–1957)	2014	Bertrand	9789722528870	Non-fiction literature
As Novas Faces do Fascismo: Populismo e a Extrema-Direita	2017	Edições Combate	9789893370711	Non-fiction literature; preface; written by Enzo Traverso
O Espetro dos Populismos. Ensaios Políticos e Historiográficos	2018	Tinta da China	9789896714482	Non-fiction literature; chapter: "Populismo: Esquerda, Direita, e Demoliberalismo"
Combates Contra a Extrema-Direita. Homenagem a José Carvalho nos 30 anos do seu assassinato	2019	Brochada	9789899605282	Non-fiction literature; co-edited with José Falcão, Luís Leiria, Francisco Louçã, Andrea Peniche, and Fernando Rosas
Novas e Velhas Extremas-Direitas	2021	Parsifal	9789898760876	Non-fiction literature; eo-edited with João Mineiro; written by Andrea Peniche and Bruno Madeira
Mulheres, Terra e Revolução: O 25 de Abril visto pelas mulheres rurais	2026	Tinta da China	9789895950188	Non-fiction literature; co-written by Fernando Oliveira Baptista, and Rita Calvário

=== Journal articles ===
Title	Publication date	Periodical publication	Issue	Notes	Ref.
Stockler e a Instrução das Raparigas - da Escola para a Família	2003	Faces de Eva	10		
Francisco de Borja Garção Stockler, professor de Matemática da Academia Real de Marinha: entre as Práticas e os Projetos de Reforma	2004	Cultura, Revista de História e Teoria das Ideias	18		

=== Newspaper articles ===
Title	Publication date	Periodical publication	Issue	Notes	Ref.
Há mulheres que não viram as costas à extrema-direita. Porquê?	2022	Setenta e Quatro		Essay	
A disputa da memória quando os extremos se tocam e o fascismo nunca existiu	2023	Setenta e Quatro		Essay	

== Filmography ==
Year	Title	Role	Notes	Ref.
2022	Novíssimas Cartas Portuguesas	—N/a	Documentary film; co-creator	

== Accolades and nominations ==
Awards and nominations received by Adam Zdrójkowski
Award	Year	Category	Nominated work	Result	Ref.
Porto Femme International Film Festival	2023	Best Documentary	Novíssimas Cartas Portuguesas (with Paula Miranda and Irina Pampim)	Won	
Porto Femme International Film Festival	2023	Women's Struggles and Rights	Novíssimas Cartas Portuguesas (with Paula Miranda and Irina Pampim)	Won	
Porto Femme International Film Festival	2023	Women's Voice	Novíssimas Cartas Portuguesas (with Paula Miranda and Irina Pampim)	Won	
