= José António Carvalho =

Portuguese politician (born 1979)

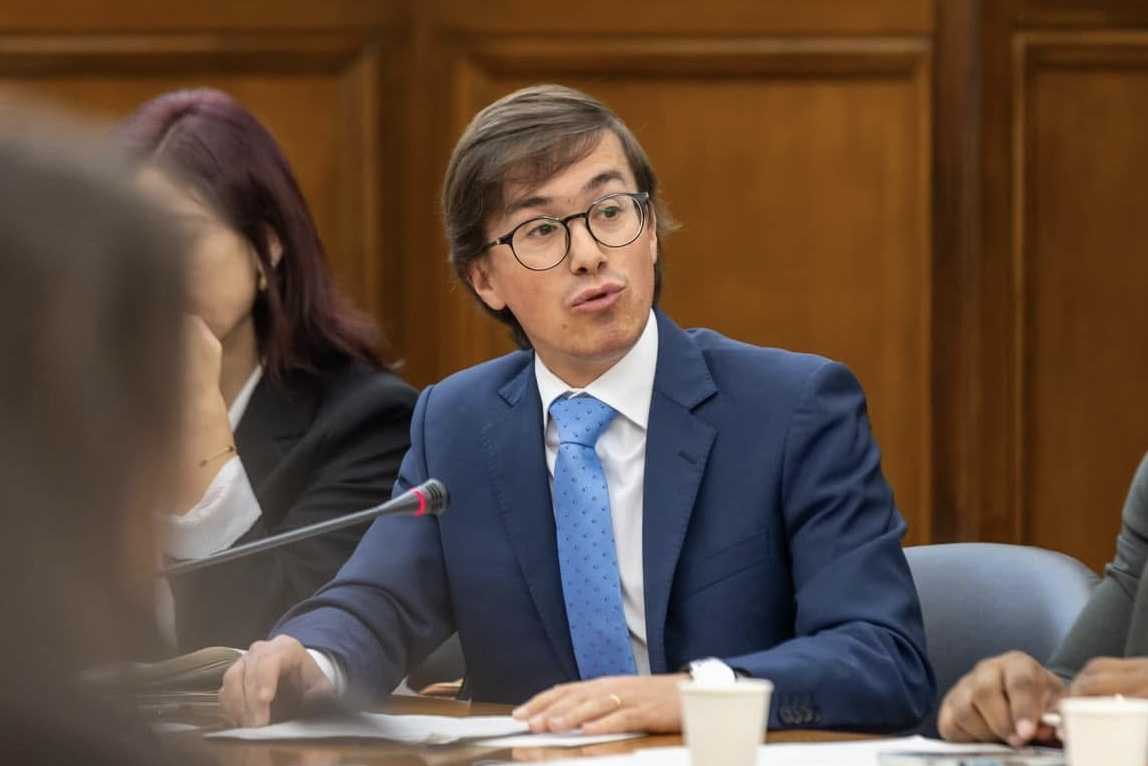

Member of the Assembly of the Republic
- Incumbent
- Assumed office 26 March 2024
- Constituency: Porto

Personal details
- Born: José António Ribeiro de Carvalho; 17 February 1979 (age 47) Fornos, Marco de Canaveses, Portugal
- Citizenship: Portugal
- Party: Chega
- Education: Universidade Portucalense Infante D. Henrique

José António Ribeiro de Carvalho (born 17 February 1979 in Fornos, Marco de Canaveses) is a Portuguese professor, author and politician of the Chega party. He has been a Member of the Assembly of the Republic for the Porto constituency since 2024.

== Biography ==
Carvalho graduated with a master's degree in history and education studies at the Universidade Portucalense Infante D. Henrique. He was then employed as a teacher and researcher at the university.

He joined Chega in 2019 and stood as a candidate for the party during the 2024 Portuguese legislative election. He was elected to represent the Porto constituency.
