= Constança Capdeville =

Portuguese pianist, percussionist, music educator and composer

Constança Capdeville (16 March 1937 – 4 February 1992) was a Portuguese pianist, percussionist, music educator and composer.

== Early years ==
Constança Capdeville was born in Barcelona and lived in the village of Caxias as a child. She came from an artistic family and in her youth was exposed to creative geniuses including Salvador Dalí. She wrote piano compositions at an early age, and studied piano and composition at the Lisbon Conservatorio Nacional, where she received a diploma in Higher Education in Music.

After completing her studies in Barcelona, Capdeville settled in Portugal in 1951. She pursued further studies in piano with Varela Cid and musical composition with Jorge Croner de Vasconcellos. She then specialized her education in music to the study of ancient music (paleography/transcribing, organology, clavichord and performance practice) with Macário Santiago Kastner.

== Biography ==
After completing her musical studies, Capdeville taught music at the National Conservatory and the New University of Lisbon. She was a member of the Portuguese Council of Music and the Catalan Composers Association of Barcelona. She won the Portuguese Medal of Cultural Merit in 1990, and the Insignia of the Order of Santiago da Espada posthumously in 1992.

Capdeville was a prolific composer. By 1969 she had begun to have her works commissioned by the Calouste Gulbenkian Foundation for its orchestra. She produced approximately 100 pieces for orchestra, chamber ensembles and a variety of soloists using different instruments. She also composed music for films and plays, ballet/dance and 'dramatized' staged performances. From early on, her music revealed close ties to the dramatic arts and to the imagery of the human condition evoked though sound and Mise en scène.

Capdeville's compositions were laden with multiple artistic perception. During her life, she was a close artistic and personal friend of music genius Jorge Peixinho who had himself been a towering influence upon the contemporary Portugal of the latter half of the 20th century. Capdeville was also a talented percussionist, but as a musician her main instrument was the piano.

Besides the conservatory, she taught at the Escola Superior de Música de Lisboa and at the Academia de Musica de Santa Cecilia in Lisbon. She also taught in the Musicology department of the 'Universidade Nova de Lisboa' (New University of Lisbon) 's Faculty of Humanities ( UNL- FCSH ). In this position, she taught a number of students who went on to prominence in music and composition and went on to receive prestigious national and international awards. These students include Eurico Carrapatoso, among others.

Capdeville died of cancer February 4, 1992, at the age of 55 in her hometown of Caxias.

== Works ==
Capdeville composed about a hundred works, including orchestral music, theater works and film soundtracks. Selected works include:

- Diferenças Sobre um Intervalo (1967) for orchestra
- Libera me (1979) for ensemble (choir, piano, percussion, tape and lights)
- Cerro Maior (dir. Luís Filipe Rocha, 1980) film music
- Don't Juan (1985), anti-opera, musical theatre
- Di lontan fa specchio il mare – Joly Braga Santos, In memoriam (1989) for ensemble
- Solo de Violino (dir. Monique Rutler, 1990) film music
- Take 91 (1991), musical theatre
- "Que mon chant ne soît plus d'oiseau," (1991) for orchestra

== Groups and ensembles ==
- Convivium Musicum, ensemble
- ColecViva, musical theatre
- Opus Sic, music for films and performances
- Palavras por dentro, theatrical
