= Monique Rutler =

French-Portuguese director, screenwriter and film editor

- Born: 2 February 1941 (age 84); Mulhouse, France
- Occupation: Filmmaker

Monique Rutler (born 2 February 1941) is a French-Portuguese director, screenwriter and film editor.

== Life and career ==
Rutler was born in Mulhouse, in the Haut-Rhin department. After the death of her father she moved to Portugal with her mother. She studied filmmaking at the Instituto das Novas Profissões and at the Lisbon Theatre and Film School. She started her career as a film editor and later as an assistant of prominent directors including José Nascimento and António de Macedo.

After directing some documentaries, Rutler made her feature film debut in 1981, with Velhos São os Trapos. Her films are characterized by strong female main characters, and often deal with machismo. In 2018 she was entered into the Academia Portuguesa das Artes e Ciências Cinematográficas. In 2019 she was awarded a Career Prize at the Porto Femme - International Film Festival.

== Selected filmography ==
- Velhos São os Trapos (1981)
- Jogo de Mão (1983)
- O Carro da Estrela (1989)
- Solo de Violino (1990)
