= Outside Europe (Assembly of the Republic constituency) =

Constituency of the Assembly of the Republic, the national legislature of Portugal

- Fora da Europa
- Constituency for the Assembly of the Republic
- Portuguese constituency of Outside Europe
- Electorate: 636,660 (2025)

Current Constituency
- Created: 1976
- Seats: 2
- Deputies: List: Manuel Magno (CH); José Cesário (PSD)

Outside Europe (Portuguese: Fora da Europa) is one of the 22 multi-member constituencies of the Assembly of the Republic, the national legislature of Portugal. It consists of Portuguese citizens residing abroad, registered in Portuguese diplomatic posts outside European countries. The constituency was established in 1976 when the Assembly of the Republic was established by the constitution following the restoration of democracy. The constituency is fixed at electing two of the 230 members of the Assembly of the Republic using the closed party-list proportional representation electoral system. At the 2025 legislative election it had 636,660 registered voters.

== Definition ==
For elections to the Assembly of the Republic, Portuguese law establishes two constituencies of Portuguese citizens residing abroad: the constituency of Europe, comprising voters registered in Portuguese diplomatic posts in European countries; and the constituency of Outside Europe, comprising voters registered in other posts. For this purpose, European countries include Armenia, Azerbaijan, Cyprus, Georgia, Russia and Turkey, but not Kazakhstan.

Each diplomatic post registers voters residing in its area of jurisdiction, which may include multiple countries and territories in different continents. As a result, as of 2025, the constituency of Europe also includes citizens residing in Lebanon, Syria, Tajikistan, Turkmenistan, Uzbekistan, and in dependent territories of European countries, except British Overseas Territories in the Caribbean and Oceania. Afghanistan was in the jurisdiction of the embassy in Turkey, in the constituency of Europe, for the 2022 election, but changed to the embassy in Pakistan, in the constituency of Outside Europe, for the 2024 election.

== Election results ==
The constituency of Outside Europe elects two of the 230 members of the Assembly of the Republic using the closed party-list proportional representation electoral system. Seats are allocated using the D'Hondt method.

=== Summary ===
Election	Unitary Democrats CDU / APU / PCP			Left Bloc BE / UDP			Socialists PS			People Animals Nature PAN			Democratic Renewal PRD			Social Democrats PSD / PàF / AD / PPD			Liberals IL			CDS – People's CDS–PP / CDS			Chega CH / PPV/CDC / PPV		
Election	Votes	%	Seats	Votes	%	Seats	Votes	%	Seats	Votes	%	Seats	Votes	%	Seats	Votes	%	Seats	Votes	%	Seats	Votes	%	Seats	Votes	%	Seats
2025	585	0.90%	0	1,760	2.71%	0	13,144	20.25%	0	2,019	3.11%	0				19,076	29.39%	1	2,066	3.18%	0				20,234	31.17%	1
2024	742	1.13%	0	1,844	2.80%	0	14,343	21.77%	0	2,328	3.53%	0				22,470	34.10%	1	1,901	2.88%	0				17,862	27.11%	1
2022	903	1.46%	0	1,699	2.74%	0	19,084	30.75%	1	2,912	4.69%	0				23,942	38.58%	1	2,254	3.63%	0	1,379	2.22%	0	6,123	9.87%	0
2019	515	1.26%	0	1,398	3.43%	0	10,060	24.65%	1	2,347	5.75%	0				16,535	40.51%	1	1,248	3.06%	0	2,127	5.21%	0	459	1.12%	0
2015	218	1.66%	0	229	1.75%	0	1,601	12.23%	0	262	2.00%	0				7,156	54.65%	2									
2011	127	1.02%	0	165	1.32%	0	2,714	21.74%	0							8,323	66.66%	2				615	4.93%	0			
2009	90	1.19%	0	177	2.35%	0	1,916	25.41%	0							4,736	62.80%	2				274	3.63%	0	37	0.49%	0
2005	137	1.12%	0	92	0.76%	0	3,552	29.16%	0							7,783	63.89%	2				470	3.86%	0			
2002	149	1.00%	0	60	0.40%	0	3,417	22.97%	0							10,523	70.74%	2				533	3.58%	0			
1999	287	1.74%	0	63	0.38%	0	6,818	41.38%	1							8,470	51.40%	1				593	3.60%	0			
1995	246	1.36%	0	54	0.30%	0	2,608	14.46%	0							14,085	78.09%	2				771	4.27%	0			
1991	308	0.98%	0				1,557	4.98%	0				143	0.46%	0	24,467	78.20%	2				4,613	14.74%	0			
1987	418	1.40%	0	54	0.18%	0	2,221	7.44%	0				513	1.72%	0	19,343	64.79%	2				6,089	20.39%	0			
1985	866	2.62%	0	130	0.39%	0	2,654	8.04%	0				1,131	3.43%	0	13,768	41.71%	1				12,889	39.05%	1			
1983	1,378	2.93%	0				3,384	7.20%	0							23,365	49.68%	1				16,511	35.11%	1			
1980	1,694	2.73%	0	263	0.42%	0	2,596	4.18%	0							54,898	88.35%	2									
1979	1,424	3.19%	0	337	0.75%	0	2,639	5.91%	0							35,689	79.92%	2									
1976	562	1.42%	0	130	0.33%	0	2,517	6.38%	0							21,317	54.01%	1				13,483	34.16%	1			

(Figures in italics represent alliances.)

=== Detailed ===
==== 2025 ====
Results of the 2025 legislative election held on 18 May 2025:

Party		Votes	%	Seats
Chega	CH	20,234	31.17%	1
Democratic Alliance	AD	19,076	29.39%	1
Socialist Party	PS	13,144	20.25%	0
Liberal Initiative	IL	2,066	3.18%	0
People Animals Nature	PAN	2,019	3.11%	0
Left Bloc	BE	1,760	2.71%	0
New Right	ND	1,485	2.29%	0
National Democratic Alternative	ADN	1,483	2.28%	0
LIVRE	L	997	1.54%	0
Unitary Democratic Coalition	CDU	585	0.90%	0
Liberal Social Party	PLS	545	0.84%	0
Volt Portugal	Volt	313	0.48%	0
Portuguese Workers' Communist Party	PCTP	299	0.46%	0
Together for the People	JPP	237	0.37%	0
We, the Citizens!	NC	198	0.31%	0
People's Monarchist Party	PPM	170	0.26%	0
React, Include, Recycle	RIR	164	0.25%	0
Ergue-te	E	131	0.20%	0
Valid votes		64,906	100.00%	2
Blank votes		368	0.37%	
Rejected votes – other		32,960	33.55%	
Total polled		98,234	15.43%	
Registered electors		636,660		

The following candidates were elected: Manuel Magno (CH) and José Cesário (AD).

==== 2024 ====
Results of the 2024 legislative election held on 10 March 2024:

Party		Votes	%	Seats
Democratic Alliance	AD	22,470	34.10%	1
Chega	CH	17,862	27.11%	1
Socialist Party	PS	14,343	21.77%	0
People Animals Nature	PAN	2,328	3.53%	0
Liberal Initiative	IL	1,901	2.88%	0
Left Bloc	BE	1,844	2.80%	0
New Right	ND	1,454	2.21%	0
National Democratic Alternative	ADN	1,115	1.69%	0
Unitary Democratic Coalition	CDU	742	1.13%	0
LIVRE	L	697	1.06%	0
Volt Portugal	Volt	272	0.41%	0
We, the Citizens!	NC	259	0.39%	0
Together for the People	JPP	201	0.31%	0
React, Include, Recycle	RIR	186	0.28%	0
Ergue-te	E	122	0.19%	0
Alternative 21 (Earth Party and Alliance)	PT-A	97	0.15%	0
Valid votes		65,893	100.00%	2
Blank votes		487	0.50%	
Rejected votes – other		31,980	32.51%	
Total polled		98,360	16.14%	
Registered electors		609,436		

The following candidates were elected: José Cesário (AD) and Manuel Magno (CH).

==== 2022 ====
Results of the 2022 legislative election held on 30 January 2022:

Party		Votes	%	Seats
Social Democratic Party	PSD	23,942	38.58%	1
Socialist Party	PS	19,084	30.75%	1
Chega	CH	6,123	9.87%	0
People Animals Nature	PAN	2,912	4.69%	0
Liberal Initiative	IL	2,254	3.63%	0
Left Bloc	BE	1,699	2.74%	0
CDS – People's Party	CDS–PP	1,379	2.22%	0
Unitary Democratic Coalition	CDU	903	1.46%	0
National Democratic Alternative	ADN	648	1.04%	0
LIVRE	L	637	1.03%	0
We, the Citizens!	NC	591	0.95%	0
Earth Party	PT	531	0.86%	0
Alliance	A	479	0.77%	0
Volt Portugal	Volt	319	0.51%	0
React, Include, Recycle	RIR	287	0.46%	0
Ergue-te	E	199	0.32%	0
Socialist Alternative Movement	MAS	72	0.12%	0
Valid votes		62,059	100.00%	2
Blank votes		568	0.88%	
Rejected votes – other		1,907	2.96%	
Total polled		64,534	10.86%	
Registered electors		594,324		

The following candidates were elected: António Maló de Abreu (PSD) and Augusto Santos Silva (PS).

==== 2019 ====
Results of the 2019 legislative election held on 6 October 2019:

Party		Votes	%	Seats
Social Democratic Party	PSD	16,535	40.51%	1
Socialist Party	PS	10,060	24.65%	1
People Animals Nature	PAN	2,347	5.75%	0
CDS – People's Party	CDS–PP	2,127	5.21%	0
Democratic Republican Party	PDR	1,732	4.24%	0
Left Bloc	BE	1,398	3.43%	0
Liberal Initiative	IL	1,248	3.06%	0
National Renewal Party	PNR	1,038	2.54%	0
Alliance	A	605	1.48%	0
Unitary Democratic Coalition	CDU	515	1.26%	0
We, the Citizens!	NC	460	1.13%	0
Chega	CH	459	1.12%	0
United Party of Retirees and Pensioners	PURP	396	0.97%	0
LIVRE	L	342	0.84%	0
Earth Party	PT	318	0.78%	0
People's Monarchist Party	PPM	300	0.74%	0
Portuguese Labour Party	PTP	300	0.74%	0
Portuguese Workers' Communist Party	PCTP	271	0.66%	0
Together for the People	JPP	195	0.48%	0
React, Include, Recycle	RIR	169	0.41%	0
Valid votes		40,815	100.00%	2
Blank votes		429	0.86%	
Rejected votes – other		8,664	17.36%	
Total polled		49,908	8.77%	
Registered electors		569,128		

The following candidates were elected: José Cesário (PSD) and Augusto Santos Silva (PS).

==== 2015 ====
Results of the 2015 legislative election held on 4 October 2015:

Party		Votes	%	Seats
Portugal Ahead	PàF	7,156	54.65%	2
We, the Citizens!	NC	2,632	20.10%	0
Socialist Party	PS	1,601	12.23%	0
Democratic Republican Party	PDR	469	3.58%	0
People Animals Nature	PAN	262	2.00%	0
Left Bloc	BE	229	1.75%	0
Unitary Democratic Coalition	CDU	218	1.66%	0
United Party of Retirees and Pensioners	PURP	121	0.92%	0
The Earth Party Movement	MPT	98	0.75%	0
National Renewal Party	PNR	85	0.65%	0
LIVRE	L	83	0.63%	0
Together for the People	JPP	53	0.40%	0
People's Monarchist Party	PPM	52	0.40%	0
Portuguese Workers' Communist Party	PCTP	19	0.15%	0
ACT! (Portuguese Labour Party and Socialist Alternative Movement)	AGIR	17	0.13%	0
Valid votes		13,095	100.00%	2
Blank votes		80	0.54%	
Rejected votes – other		1,584	10.73%	
Total polled		14,759	8.97%	
Registered electors		164,507		

The following candidates were elected: José Cesário (PàF) and Carlos Páscoa Gonçalves (PàF).

==== 2011 ====
Results of the 2011 legislative election held on 5 June 2011:

Party		Votes	%	Seats
Social Democratic Party	PSD	8,323	66.66%	2
Socialist Party	PS	2,714	21.74%	0
CDS – People's Party	CDS–PP	615	4.93%	0
Left Bloc	BE	165	1.32%	0
Unitary Democratic Coalition	CDU	127	1.02%	0
Hope for Portugal Movement	MEP	125	1.00%	0
New Democracy Party	ND	123	0.99%	0
The Earth Party Movement	MPT	87	0.70%	0
National Renewal Party	PNR	64	0.51%	0
Portuguese Workers' Communist Party	PCTP	52	0.42%	0
People's Monarchist Party	PPM	47	0.38%	0
Humanist Party	PH	43	0.34%	0
Valid votes		12,485	100.00%	2
Blank votes		99	0.65%	
Rejected votes – other		2,536	16.77%	
Total polled		15,120	12.59%	
Registered electors		120,058		

The following candidates were elected: José Cesário (PSD) and Carlos Páscoa Gonçalves (PSD).

==== 2009 ====
Results of the 2009 legislative election held on 27 September 2009:

Party		Votes	%	Seats
Social Democratic Party	PSD	4,736	62.80%	2
Socialist Party	PS	1,916	25.41%	0
CDS – People's Party	CDS–PP	274	3.63%	0
Left Bloc	BE	177	2.35%	0
The Earth Party Movement and Humanist Party	MPT-PH	90	1.19%	0
Unitary Democratic Coalition	CDU	90	1.19%	0
Hope for Portugal Movement	MEP	69	0.91%	0
New Democracy Party	ND	60	0.80%	0
People's Monarchist Party	PPM	43	0.57%	0
Pro-Life Party	PPV	37	0.49%	0
Portuguese Workers' Communist Party	PCTP	23	0.30%	0
National Renewal Party	PNR	14	0.19%	0
Merit and Society Movement	MMS	12	0.16%	0
Valid votes		7,541	100.00%	2
Blank votes		54	0.62%	
Rejected votes – other		1,099	12.64%	
Total polled		8,694	9.20%	
Registered electors		94,471		

The following candidates were elected: José Cesário (PSD) and Carlos Páscoa Gonçalves (PSD).

==== 2005 ====
Results of the 2005 legislative election held on 20 February 2005:

Party		Votes	%	Seats
Social Democratic Party	PSD	7,783	63.89%	2
Socialist Party	PS	3,552	29.16%	0
CDS – People's Party	CDS–PP	470	3.86%	0
Unitary Democratic Coalition	CDU	137	1.12%	0
New Democracy Party	ND	97	0.80%	0
Left Bloc	BE	92	0.76%	0
Portuguese Workers' Communist Party	PCTP	28	0.23%	0
National Renewal Party	PNR	23	0.19%	0
Valid votes		12,182	100.00%	2
Blank votes		35	0.26%	
Rejected votes – other		1,232	9.16%	
Total polled		13,449	18.56%	
Registered electors		72,475		

The following candidates were elected: José Cesário (PSD) and Carlos Páscoa Gonçalves (PSD).

==== 2002 ====
Results of the 2002 legislative election held on 17 March 2002:

Party		Votes	%	Seats
Social Democratic Party	PSD	10,523	70.74%	2
Socialist Party	PS	3,417	22.97%	0
CDS – People's Party	CDS–PP	533	3.58%	0
Unitary Democratic Coalition	CDU	149	1.00%	0
The Earth Party Movement	MPT	88	0.59%	0
Left Bloc	BE	60	0.40%	0
People's Monarchist Party	PPM	47	0.32%	0
Portuguese Workers' Communist Party	PCTP	38	0.26%	0
National Renewal Party	PNR	20	0.13%	0
Valid votes		14,875	100.00%	2
Blank votes		71	0.45%	
Rejected votes – other		936	5.89%	
Total polled		15,882	20.61%	
Registered electors		77,074		

The following candidates were elected: Maria Manuela Aguiar (PSD) and Eduardo Moreira (PSD).

==== 1999 ====
Results of the 1999 legislative election held on 10 October 1999:

Party		Votes	%	Seats
Social Democratic Party	PSD	8,470	51.40%	1
Socialist Party	PS	6,818	41.38%	1
CDS – People's Party	CDS–PP	593	3.60%	0
Unitary Democratic Coalition	CDU	287	1.74%	0
National Solidarity Party	PSN	83	0.50%	0
The Earth Party Movement	MPT	69	0.42%	0
Left Bloc	BE	63	0.38%	0
Portuguese Workers' Communist Party	PCTP	49	0.30%	0
People's Monarchist Party	PPM	45	0.27%	0
Valid votes		16,477	100.00%	2
Blank votes		104	0.61%	
Rejected votes – other		543	3.17%	
Total polled		17,124	19.79%	
Registered electors		86,527		

The following candidates were elected: Maria Manuela Aguiar (PSD) and Caio Roque (PS).

==== 1995 ====
Results of the 1995 legislative election held on 1 October 1995:

Party		Votes	%	Seats
Social Democratic Party	PSD	14,085	78.09%	2
Socialist Party	PS	2,608	14.46%	0
CDS – People's Party	CDS–PP	771	4.27%	0
Unitary Democratic Coalition	CDU	246	1.36%	0
The Earth Party Movement	MPT	92	0.51%	0
Revolutionary Socialist Party	PSR	78	0.43%	0
Democratic Party of the Atlantic	PDA	64	0.35%	0
Popular Democratic Union	UDP	54	0.30%	0
Portuguese Workers' Communist Party	PCTP	40	0.22%	0
Valid votes		18,038	100.00%	2
Blank votes		170	0.84%	
Rejected votes – other		2,119	10.42%	
Total polled		20,327	20.41%	
Registered electors		99,570		

The following candidates were elected: Maria Manuela Aguiar (PSD) and Carlos Pinto (PSD).

==== 1991 ====
Results of the 1991 legislative election held on 6 October 1991:

Party		Votes	%	Seats
Social Democratic Party	PSD	24,467	78.20%	2
Social Democratic Centre Party	CDS	4,613	14.74%	0
Socialist Party	PS	1,557	4.98%	0
Unitary Democratic Coalition	CDU	308	0.98%	0
Democratic Renewal Party	PRD	143	0.46%	0
People's Monarchist Party	PPM	105	0.34%	0
Democratic Party of the Atlantic	PDA	43	0.14%	0
Portuguese Workers' Communist Party	PCTP	28	0.09%	0
Revolutionary Socialist Party	PSR	23	0.07%	0
Valid votes		31,287	100.00%	2
Blank votes		180	0.57%	
Rejected votes – other		177	0.56%	
Total polled		31,644	30.69%	
Registered electors		103,103		

The following candidates were elected: Paulo Pereira Coelho (PSD) and Carlos Miguel Oliveira (PSD).

==== 1987 ====
Results of the 1987 legislative election held on 19 July 1987:

Party		Votes	%	Seats
Social Democratic Party	PSD	19,343	64.79%	2
Social Democratic Centre Party	CDS	6,089	20.39%	0
Socialist Party	PS	2,221	7.44%	0
Christian Democratic Party	PDC	706	2.36%	0
Democratic Renewal Party	PRD	513	1.72%	0
Unitary Democratic Coalition	CDU	418	1.40%	0
Portuguese Democratic Movement	MDP	247	0.83%	0
People's Monarchist Party	PPM	90	0.30%	0
Portuguese Workers' Communist Party	PCTP	82	0.27%	0
Revolutionary Socialist Party	PSR	73	0.24%	0
Popular Democratic Union	UDP	54	0.18%	0
Communist Party (Reconstructed)	PC(R)	20	0.07%	0
Valid votes		29,856	100.00%	2
Blank votes		549	1.79%	
Rejected votes – other		183	0.60%	
Total polled		30,588	26.69%	
Registered electors		114,603		

The following candidates were elected: Luís Amaral (PSD) and Luís Geraldes (PSD).

==== 1985 ====
Results of the 1985 legislative election held on 6 October 1985:

Party		Votes	%	Seats
Social Democratic Party	PSD	13,768	41.71%	1
Social Democratic Centre Party	CDS	12,889	39.05%	1
Socialist Party	PS	2,654	8.04%	0
Christian Democratic Party	PDC	1,396	4.23%	0
Democratic Renewal Party	PRD	1,131	3.43%	0
United People Alliance	APU	866	2.62%	0
Popular Democratic Union	UDP	130	0.39%	0
Portuguese Workers' Communist Party	PCTP	84	0.25%	0
Workers' Party of Socialist Unity	POUS	41	0.12%	0
Revolutionary Socialist Party	PSR	35	0.11%	0
Communist Party (Reconstructed)	PC(R)	33	0.10%	0
Valid votes		33,009	100.05%	2
Blank votes		773	2.28%	
Rejected votes – other		191	0.56%	
Total polled		33,973	29.49%	
Registered electors		115,212		

The following candidates were elected: José Gama (CDS) and Luís Geraldes (PSD).

==== 1983 ====
Results of the 1983 legislative election held on 25 April 1983:

Party		Votes	%	Seats
Social Democratic Party	PSD	23,365	49.68%	1
Social Democratic Centre Party	CDS	16,511	35.11%	1
Socialist Party	PS	3,384	7.20%	0
Christian Democratic Party	PDC	1,766	3.75%	0
United People Alliance	APU	1,378	2.93%	0
Democratic Party of the Atlantic	PDA	352	0.75%	0
Portuguese Workers' Communist Party	PCTP	97	0.21%	0
Socialist Workers League	LST	66	0.14%	0
Workers' Party of Socialist Unity	POUS	52	0.11%	0
Communist Party (Revolutionary)	PC(R)	38	0.08%	0
Popular Democratic Union and Revolutionary Socialist Party	UDP-PSR	23	0.05%	0
Valid votes		47,032	100.00%	2
Blank votes		878	1.81%	
Rejected votes – other		529	1.09%	
Total polled		48,439	43.74%	
Registered electors		110,749		

The following candidates were elected: Maria Manuela Aguiar (PSD) and José Gama (CDS).

==== 1980 ====
Results of the 1980 legislative election held on 5 October 1980:

Party		Votes	%	Seats
Democratic Alliance	AD	54,898	88.35%	2
Socialist Party	PS	2,596	4.18%	0
Christian Democratic Party, Independent Movement for the National Reconstruction / Party of the Portuguese Right and National Front	PDC- MIRN/ PDP- FN	2,127	3.42%	0
United People Alliance	APU	1,694	2.73%	0
Popular Democratic Union	UDP	263	0.42%	0
Labour Party	PT	175	0.28%	0
Democratic Party of the Atlantic	PDA	170	0.27%	0
Portuguese Workers' Communist Party	PCTP	122	0.20%	0
Workers' Party of Socialist Unity	POUS	51	0.08%	0
Revolutionary Socialist Party	PSR	40	0.06%	0
Valid votes		62,136	100.00%	2
Blank votes		904	1.41%	
Rejected votes – other		1,143	1.78%	
Total polled		64,183	61.04%	
Registered electors		105,151		

The following candidates were elected: Maria Manuela Aguiar (AD) and José Gama (AD).

==== 1979 ====
Results of the 1979 legislative election held on 2 December 1979:

Party		Votes	%	Seats
Democratic Alliance	AD	35,689	79.92%	2
Christian Democratic Party	PDC	4,142	9.28%	0
Socialist Party	PS	2,639	5.91%	0
United People Alliance	APU	1,424	3.19%	0
Popular Democratic Union	UDP	337	0.75%	0
Portuguese Workers' Communist Party	PCTP	223	0.50%	0
Left-wing Union for the Socialist Democracy	UEDS	172	0.39%	0
Revolutionary Socialist Party	PSR	28	0.06%	0
Valid votes		44,654	100.00%	2
Blank votes		643	1.39%	
Rejected votes – other		879	1.90%	
Total polled		46,176	63.18%	
Registered electors		73,089		

The following candidates were elected: José Gama (AD) and António Maria Pereira (AD).

==== 1976 ====
Results of the 1976 legislative election held on 25 April 1976:

Party		Votes	%	Seats
Democratic People's Party	PPD	21,317	54.01%	1
Social Democratic Centre Party	CDS	13,483	34.16%	1
Socialist Party	PS	2,517	6.38%	0
Christian Democratic Party	PDC	1,277	3.24%	0
Portuguese Communist Party	PCP	562	1.42%	0
Popular Democratic Union	UDP	130	0.33%	0
People's Monarchist Party	PPM	123	0.31%	0
Movement of Socialist Left	MES	36	0.09%	0
Worker–Peasant Alliance	AOC	21	0.05%	0
Internationalist Communist League	LCI	3	0.01%	0
Valid votes		39,469	100.00%	2
Rejected votes		578	1.44%	
Total polled		40,047	82.80%	
Registered electors		48,368		

The following candidates were elected: António Simões (CDS) and José Theodoro da Silva (PPD).

== Voter statistics ==
The table below lists the number of voters registered in Portuguese diplomatic posts located in each country or region, for each legislative election. Some posts have jurisdiction over multiple countries and territories in different continents, so some numbers in the table include some voters residing in locations other than the named country or region.

The number of voters increased dramatically in 2018 due to the adoption of automatic voter registration.

Registered voters in the constituency of Outside Europe
Country or region	2025	2024	2022	2019	2015	2011	2009	2005	2002
Americas	467,361	438,672	423,557	394,288	142,844	103,412	78,289	51,392	53,840
Asia and Oceania	117,279	107,180	103,007	110,021	12,023	7,883	7,606	13,009	13,127
Africa	52,020	63,584	69,007	66,855	9,640	8,761	8,575	8,174	10,107
Brazil	277,980	256,413	240,140	220,610	101,916	73,370	53,347	26,258	27,530
United States	70,075	65,242	62,313	56,653	9,454	9,353	9,608	9,616	8,904
Canada	57,971	54,161	55,865	55,282	12,197	9,241	7,242	7,795	8,666
Macau	47,760	48,646	63,313	65,293	8,223	4,209	4,047	11,521	11,622
Venezuela	45,456	48,229	52,867	52,405	17,233	9,657	6,398	6,063	6,998
Israel	42,002	31,802	7,002	1,084	38	18	19	7	7
South Africa	25,239	30,630	33,584	32,655	6,470	5,302	5,410	4,437	5,537
India	14,436	13,941	19,211	30,196	1,458	1,651	1,662	176	203
Angola	11,917	16,337	18,007	19,351	362	648	785	1,036	1,274
Mozambique	7,669	8,657	9,803	9,215	1,467	1,412	1,336	1,440	1,825
Argentina	7,623	6,849	6,098	5,396	1,162	1,111	1,041	966	1,027
Australia	6,571	6,355	7,567	7,970	1,737	1,400	1,442	1,109	1,081
Cape Verde	3,623	4,452	4,691	3,243	519	541	425	281	334
United Arab Emirates	2,675	2,810	2,664	2,474	79				
Chile	2,014	1,930	1,314	642	44	18	10	16	16
Colombia	1,646	1,217	829	501	223	51	54	80	93
Panama	1,586	1,534	1,497	785					
Mexico	1,443	1,502	1,053	602	50	28	15	15	18
Timor-Leste	1,097	994	933	916	245	407	287		
Uruguay	968	1,022	1,195	1,163	535	563	558	506	484
São Tomé and Príncipe	591	626	706	630	171	140	113	85	87
Peru	587	557	361	224	30	20	14	7	7
Qatar	551	571	496	524	17				
Saudi Arabia	541	474	326	267	15	20	27	33	12
Namibia	536	547	471	405	159			283	313
Zimbabwe	506	467	405	389	283	351	206	280	299
Singapore	485	473	459	357	44	21			
Morocco	414	416	372	149	11	10	11	19	33
China (mainland)	316	336	387	405	71	67	55	15	10
Japan	285	278	284	252	51	52	41	42	39
Thailand	277	244	175	115	21	9	3	1	1
Senegal	271	271	362	279	26	22	27	16	10
Guinea-Bissau	268	223	162	144	117	180	122	88	118
Democratic Republic of the Congo	217	207	138	103	33	78	87	125	163
Tunisia	194	203	125	59	6	1	1	2	3
Kenya	190	184				41	35	52	63
Indonesia	138	133	105	107	2	5			
Nigeria	110	83	84	98		2	2	6	9
Ivory Coast	91	102						7	9
South Korea	85	75	49	23	11	8	6		
Egypt	83	53	38	39	9	12	13	2	8
Ethiopia	70	95	20	23					
Pakistan	41	27	22	22	11	12	13	56	65
Algeria	21	21	24	43	2	2	2	2	5
Cuba	12	16	25	25			2	6	10
Iran	12	14	7	4		3	3	3	3
Equatorial Guinea	10	10	11	24					
Kazakhstan	7	7	7	12					
Bermuda								64	87
Hong Kong								46	58
Iraq									26
Zambia								13	17
Libya			4	6	5	19			
Philippines						1	1		
Total	636,660	609,436	595,571	571,164	164,507	120,056	94,470	72,575	77,074
