= Luís Graça =

Portuguese politician (born 1972)

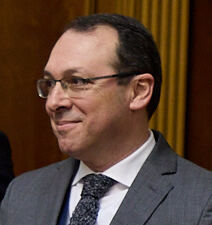
- Graça in 2024

Member of the Assembly of the Republic
- Incumbent
- Assumed office 23 October 2015
- Constituency: Faro

Personal details
- Born: 16 August 1972 (age 53)
- Party: Socialist Party

Luís Miguel da Graça Nunes (born 16 August 1972) is a Portuguese politician serving as a member of the Assembly of the Republic since 2015. From 2017 to 2021, he served as chairman of the municipal council of Faro.
