= Luís Filipe Madeira =

Portuguese politician, lawyer

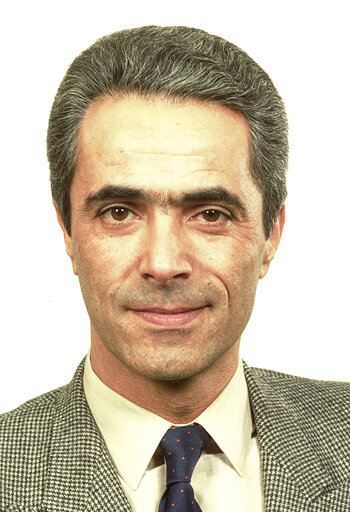
- Official portrait as an MEP, 1987

Member of the Assembly of the Republic
- In office 24 July 1989 – 24 October 1999
- Constituency: Faro
- In office 3 June 1976 – 31 May 1983
- Constituency: Faro

Member of the European Parliament
- In office 1 January 1986 – 24 July 1989
- Constituency: Portugal

Member of the Constituent Assembly
- In office 2 June 1975 – 2 April 1976
- Constituency: Faro

Personal details
- Born: Luís Filipe Nascimento Madeira; September 30, 1940 (age 86) Alte, Portugal
- Party: Portuguese Democratic Movement, Socialist Party
- Education: University of Coimbra
- Profession: Politician, lawyer, civil servant

Luís Filipe Nascimento Madeira (born September 30, 1940, in Alte, Loulé) is a Portuguese politician, lawyer, and civil servant. He served as a member of the national parliament for many years and was a Member of the European Parliament for the II term from 1986 to 1989.

== Biography ==
Madeira graduated in law from the University of Coimbra and worked as a lawyer. In 1969, he ran for parliament as a candidate of the Portuguese Democratic Movement and later joined the Socialist Party. From August 16, 1974, to April 17, 1975, he served as the civil governor of the Faro district. He was a member of the Constituent Assembly from 1975 to 1976 and then, from 1976 to 1999 (with a break from 1983 to 1985), he served in the Assembly of the Republic for multiple terms, representing the Faro district. From 1976 to 1978, he was the undersecretary of state in the Ministry of Tourism, and from 1978 to 1979, he was a member of the Parliamentary Assembly of the Council of Europe. From 1983 to 1987, he headed the tourist region of Algarve.

From January 1, 1986, to September 13, 1987, Madeira served as a Member of the European Parliament as part of the national delegation. In 1987, he was elected in direct elections. He joined the Party of European Socialists group and served as its vice-chairman from 1986 to 1989. He was a member of the Committee on Agriculture, Fisheries and Rural Development.
