= Chega =

Far-right political party in Portugal

- Abbreviation: CH
- President: André Ventura
- Vice Presidents: António Tânger Corrêa; Pedro Frazão; Marta Martins da Silva
- Founder: André Ventura
- Founded: 9 April 2019; 7 years ago
- Split from: Social Democratic Party
- Headquarters: Lisbon
- Youth wing: Juventude Chega
- Membership (2025): c. 70,000
- Ideology: National conservatism; Right-wing populism; Social conservatism; Euroscepticism
- Political position: Far-right
- National affiliation: Basta! (2019)
- European affiliation: Patriots.eu
- European Parliament group: Patriots for Europe (since 2024) (Note: The party was formerly part of Identity and Democracy (2020–2024).)
- Colours: Dark blue
- Slogan: Deus, pátria, família e trabalho ('God, country, family and work')
- Assembly of the Republic: 60 / 230
- European Parliament: 2 / 21
- Regional parliaments: 8 / 104
- Local government (Mayors): 3 / 308
- Local government (Parishes): 137 / 3,216

Election symbol

Website
- partidochega.pt

Chega (Portuguese: [ˈʃeɣɐ]; officially stylised as CHEGA!, lit. 'Enough!'; CH) is a national conservative and right-wing populist political party in Portugal, formed in 2019 by André Ventura. It is on the far-right of the political spectrum.

The party started as a movement within the Social Democratic Party (PSD) led by André Ventura. After failing to unseat the PSD's leader, Rui Rio, Ventura left and registered Chega as its own party.

The party's ideology focuses heavily on issues of criminality and the misuse of tax payer money. They have pledged to support the police services of the country and control the misuse of taxpayer funds by reducing overstaffing in the civil service and reducing welfare.

Chega won one seat in the Assembly of the Republic in the 2019 election. Since this election, the party has rapidly grown in popularity, gaining significant support for its anti-establishment positions. It was the third most voted party in the elections of 2022 taking 12 seats. It saw a surge in support in the 2024 election winning 50 seats, more than quadrupling its previous seat count. It improved its position further in the 2025 election, winning 60 seats and overtaking the Socialist Party's tally to achieve second place.

== History ==
=== Foundation and Basta! coalition ===
André Ventura was the Social Democratic Party (PSD) candidate for mayor of Loures in the Lisbon District in the 2017 local elections. During his campaign, he made comments about Romani people in Portugal that led to a criminal complaint by Left Bloc candidate Fabian Figueiredo, and the withdrawal of the endorsement from the CDS – People's Party.

After Rui Rio's election as leader of the PSD, André Ventura founded a movement within the party called "Chega", with the objective of gathering enough signatures to unseat Rio. After not being able to do so, in October 2018, he left the PSD, turned his movement into a new party with the same name, and resigned his seat on Loures city council.

Chega had been initially prevented from registering as a political party as some of the 8,000 signatures presented to the Constitutional Court included minors and police officers. The court accepted the party's registration on 9 April 2019. Ventura made a coalition with the People's Monarchist Party, Citizenship and Christian Democracy and Democracy 21, for which he would be the lead candidate in the 2019 European Parliament election in Portugal. The coalition was approved by the Constitutional Court at the third request as it was rejected the first two times for having a name that included "Chega"; it was finally named Basta!, a synonym of Chega in Portuguese. Ventura garnered controversy for not attending an electoral debate and instead appearing on CMTV in his role as a sports pundit; coalition representative Sofia Afonso Ferreira said that this was due to a late change of the debate's timing by broadcaster Rádio e Televisão de Portugal. The coalition targeted one or two seats in the European Parliament but won none, taking 1.49% of the vote.

=== 2019 and 2022 elections ===
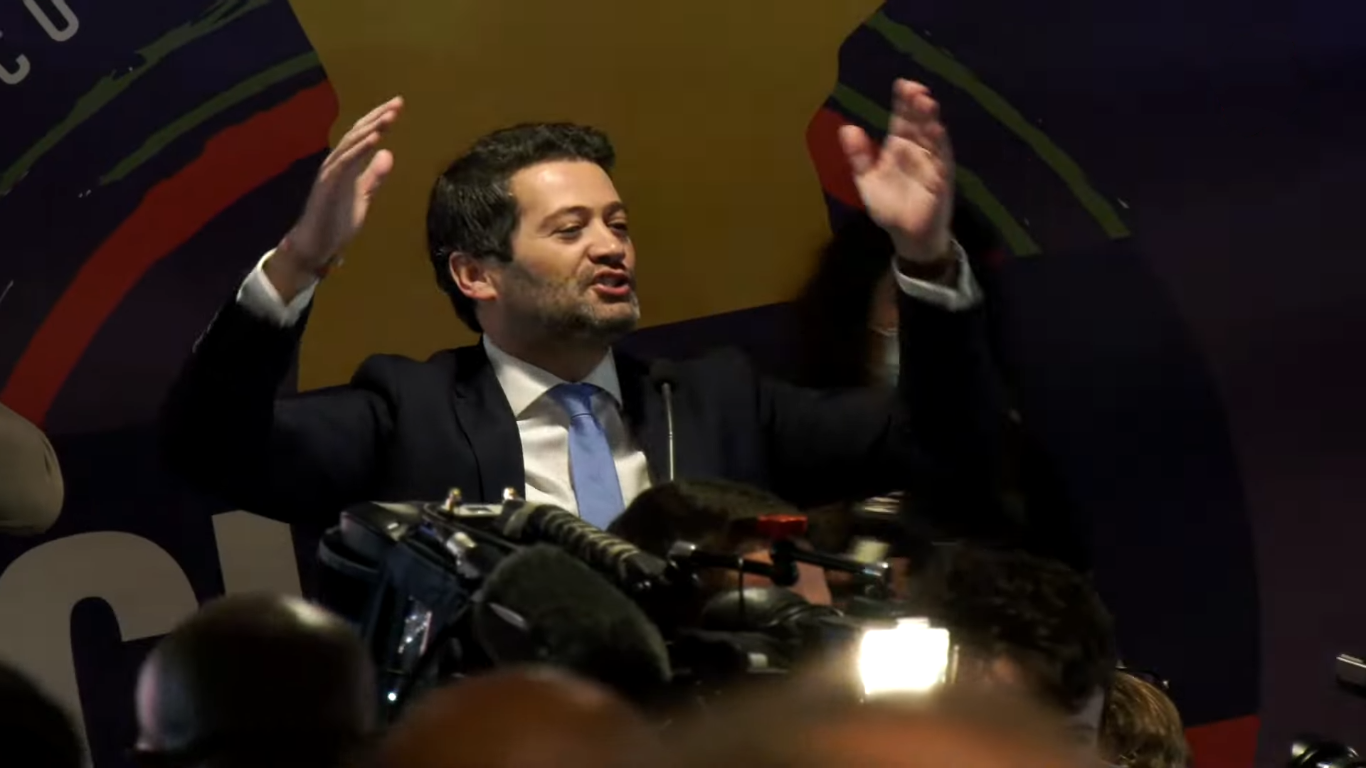
André Ventura on the night of the 2022 legislative election, after Chega became the third largest party

In the 2019 Portuguese legislative election, Chega won one seat in the Assembly of the Republic, taken by Ventura for the Lisbon constituency. Throughout the 2010s, Portugal was widely seen internationally as an exception to the advance of right-wing populism in Europe.

Chega entered the Legislative Assembly of the Azores with two seats in the 2020 regional election. While the Socialist Party (PS) won the most seats, Chega gave support to a right-leaning government led by José Manuel Bolieiro of the PSD, in exchange for a review of the region's constitutional status. Ricardo Cabral Fernandes of Jacobin reflected that "The Azores are a small region — but this was a big step in the normalization of Chega, and a trial run for a similar solution at a national scale".

Ventura ran for the mainly ceremonial role of President of Portugal in the 2021 election, coming third with 12% of the vote, marginally behind runner-up Ana Gomes of the PS. Ventura celebrated his result as the "first time an openly anti-system party has disrupted the traditional right".

In the 2022 general election, receiving 7.2% of the vote, it increased its seat count to 12, coming third behind the PS and PSD.

=== 2024 election ===
In the 2024 general election it received 18.07% of the vote, quadrupling its seat count to a final total of 50.

In the 2024 election, the party was the most voted in the Faro constituency, which corresponds to the Algarve. This was the first time that a third party was the most voted in a district since the Unitary Democratic Coalition (CDU) won the Beja District in 1991. The party was the most voted in ten municipalities, five of which were in the Algarve, though its highest percentage was 36.53% in Elvas in the Portalegre District. Portuguese political scientists credited Chega's advances to a protest vote against the two largest parties, and as the result of the difficulty locals face when finding housing in the tourism-heavy region.

Luís Montenegro, leader of the PSD and the Democratic Alliance (AD) coalition that took the plurality of votes in the election, refused the prospect of forming a coalition with Chega. When invited to form a government by President Marcelo Rebelo de Sousa, he continued with this position and chose to form a minority government. Ventura said that Chega would vote against the state budget proposed by AD if his party were not included in the government.

During the 2024 election, Chega nominated two Evangelical pastors, both of whom were elected as MPs for the party.

=== 2025 election ===
Chega improved its position again in the 2025 general election, winning 60 seats, beating the Socialist Party, and gathering 22.8% of the votes. The party strongly outperformed polls, which had put their vote share under 20%. Retaining its position as the most voted party in the Faro constituency, Chega added three more southern districts from the Socialists: Beja, Portalegre and Setúbal. Alison Roberts of BBC News put forward that Chega had been helped by recent scandals involving prime ministers from the Socialist and Social Democratic parties, respectively; the election had been triggered by a motion of no confidence in Luís Montenegro for alleged conflict of interest.

In the 2025 local elections, Chega gained its first three mayors – Albufeira, Entroncamento and São Vicente, Madeira – though it had set a target of 30. It came third for votes with 11.86%, a halving since the general election, but fifth for mayors and more than doubling the 2021 local election results (4.16%).

=== 2026 election ===
In the 2026 presidential election, party leader André Ventura repeated his presidential run from five years ago, polling this time at second place with 23.5% of the votes and faced the PS supported candidate, António José Seguro, in a runoff. Ventura was defeated, gathering 33% of the votes against the 67% of Seguro.

== Ideology ==
Chega considers itself a party with nationalist, conservative and personalist roots. Third-party sources have defined the party as ultranationalist. It defends the promotion of an effective judicial system and the decrease of the state's intervention in the economy. The party also presents itself as national conservative and social conservative.

The agenda of Chega is heavily focused on criminality issues, support for the police forces of the country, and to control the misuse of taxpayers' money in terms of corruption at the top, overstaffing in the civil service at the middle and underserving welfare recipients at the bottom. Chega's president, André Ventura, has protested with a group of police officers called Movement Zero, who have suspected extremist ties.

The party's slogan, "God, country, family and work" is an appropriation and elaboration of the slogan "God, country, family" used by the Portuguese dictator António de Oliveira Salazar.

=== Constitutional revision ===
Chega supports a rewriting of the Constitution of the Portuguese Republic to be "smaller and less ideological". The current Portuguese constitution was drafted during the Ongoing Revolutionary Process (PREC), a tumultuous period of Portuguese history where a transition to some form of socialist society seemed imminent. Two revisions in 1982 and 1989 removed some of the overtly leftist ideological bent (including allowing for privatizations) as well as more charged language, but crucially, the phrase that the constitution itself "opens the way for a socialist society" remains. This is taken by many as an official declaration that Portugal is, or at the very least, ought to be an ideologically socialist state. Despite being a relatively small section of the constitution, Chega takes this to be a form of ideological favoritism that ignores and alienates large sections of the Portuguese population, resulting in an overall unrepresentative constitution.

Proposed constitutional changes involve getting rid of several government positions and jobs (including but not limited to, the Ministry of Education), reducing the number of members of the Assembly to 100 down from 230, reviewing parliamentary immunity, and requiring that the prime-minister be a Portuguese citizen from birth. More drastically, Ventura has argued for the abolishment of the position of prime minister, thus ushering in a "Fourth Portuguese Republic" under a presidential system, as well as getting rid of the constitution's "material guardrails", which would facilitate further amendments to any and all of its parts.

=== Society ===
Chega supports life imprisonment sentences, the reintroduction of the death penalty and chemical castration for reoffending rapists.

Chega opposes abortion, same-sex marriage, and the rights of transgender people.

Chega has ties to conservative Christian movements and prominent members such as the party's leader, André Ventura and vice president Pedro Frazão are well-known Catholics. In 2024, 67.9% of Chega supporters identified as having a religious identity. Chega also has ties with and enjoys support from many Christian movements, including several Evangelical Churches where the majority of congregants are of Brazilian origin. While this fact may be used to dissuade charges of xenophobia, critics of the party have highlighted the hypocrisy of touting anti-immigrant rhetoric while enjoying broad support from certain immigrant demographics, with some immigration restrictionists both within and outside the party even alleging a conflict of interest.

==== Immigration and minorities ====
Describing itself a "strong proponent of Western civilization", the party positions itself against "Islamist extremism" and proposes stronger border controls and a decrease of "mass and illegal immigration". It has been also described as antiziganist. The party supports integration measures for immigrants and states that all immigrants and foreign residents should be "obliged to respect our rules, rites, customs and traditions." It also supports bilateral agreements and priority for skills-based immigration from the Community of Portuguese Language Countries and former Portuguese colonies such as Brazil, Portuguese-speaking African countries, Macau and East Timor while taking a more critical stance on non-Western immigration and arguing that all work visa applicants must undergo a selection test and demonstrate adaptability to the Portuguese language. It also calls for a zero tolerance policy on illegal immigration and for the deportation of immigrants with criminal records or those who are economically inactive. It is also opposed to multiculturalism. The party claims that it rejects xenophobia on its platform. The party opposes illegal immigration and "open door immigration" policies for both Portugal and the external border of the European Union.

=== Economy ===
The party advocates for a decrease of the tax incidence, considering the current system to be "brutal and aggressive to the ones who work and build wealth, taking away half of their incomes". It additionally defends a reduction of both bureaucracy and the number of bureaucrats, asserting that it is one of the main reasons for the "Portuguese competitive economic backwardness". Some of this reduction includes allowing more private options education and healthcare.

=== Foreign policy ===
==== Europe ====
Chega's stance on the European Union has been described as Eurosceptic. The party states that it supports the original "four freedoms" principle of free movement of goods, capital, services and people among member states, but argues for a "Europe of sovereign nations united by shared Greco-Roman and Judeo-Christian principles" and opposes interference into national political decision-making within member states by the EU. It also calls on Portugal to pursue more independent foreign and economic policies from Brussels and rejects compulsory EU migrant and refugee quotas. Furthermore, the party also argues that Portugal should work to drastically reform the EU and that the country must exit the block if the EU tries to become a federal state.

On the Russo-Ukrainian War, António Tânger Corrêa, the party's vice president and leading candidate for the 2024 European Parliament election, has been critical of Ukraine, advocating a peace deal that would involve "reinforced cooperation" between Ukraine and Russia in a way that the "Russians feel comfortable". On the other hand, Ventura has said that the defeat of Ukraine will be the defeat of the entire West, and Portugal, as a member of NATO and the European Union, should send troops "in case of extreme need". However, Ventura later stated that he was opposed to sending Portuguese troops to Ukraine and advocated greater scrutiny of Ukraine aid, suggesting that "hundreds of millions" of taxpayer funds were being used to "support a political clientele around Zelensky".

==== Brazil ====
Chega supported the presidency of Jair Bolsonaro in Brazil, but party leader Ventura said that the former President of Brazil deserves condemnation if proven to have instigated the 2023 Brazilian Congress attack; Ventura also said that sections of the Brazilian population were right to be frustrated by Luiz Inácio Lula da Silva's victory over Bolsonaro before the attack.

==== Middle East ====
Chega has taken a strongly pro-Israel stance on the Gaza war, criticising other Portuguese political parties for their stances on the conflict. The party has advocated for the recognition of Jerusalem as the capital of Israel and the eventual transfer of the Portuguese embassy to that city. Representatives of Israel's Likud party have already participated in Chega conventions, thanking the Portuguese party for its support for this position.

== Organization ==
=== Leadership elections ===
The 2020 Chega leadership election was held on 6 September 2020. André Ventura was re-elected with more than 99% of the vote, facing no opposition. The party's statutes have been rejected by the Constitutional Court several times for concentrating excessive power in the hands of Ventura.

=== Factions ===
In 2020, it was reported that there was a "guerrilla atmosphere" within the party, the result of tensions between the different factions that make up the party.

=== Elected politicians ===
==== Members of the Assembly of the Republic ====
17th Legislature (2025 – present)
- André Ventura (Lisbon)
- Rui Paulo Sousa (Lisbon)
- Marta Martins da Silva (Lisbon)
- Pedro Pessanha (Lisbon)
- Ricardo Dias Pinto (Lisbon)
- Felicidade Vital (Lisbon)
- Bruno Nunes (Lisbon)
- José Barreira Soares (Lisbon)
- Patrícia de Almeida (Lisbon)
- Madalena Cordeiro (Lisbon)
- Rui Cardoso (Lisbon)
- Rui Afonso (Porto)
- Diogo Pacheco de Amorim (Porto)
- Cristina Rodrigues (Porto)
- José António Carvalho (Porto)
- Marcus Santos (Porto)
- Sónia Monteiro (Porto)
- Patrícia Nascimento (Porto)
- Raul Melo (Porto)
- Idalina Costa (Porto)
- Filipe Melo (Braga)
- Rodrigo Alves Taxa (Braga)
- Vanessa Barata (Braga)
- Carlos Alberto Pinto (Braga)
- Lina Pinheiro (Braga)
- Rita Matias (Setúbal)
- Patrícia de Carvalho (Setúbal)
- Nuno Gabriel (Setúbal)
- Daniel Teixeira (Setúbal)
- Cláudia Estêvão (Setúbal)
- Ricardo Reis (Setúbal)
- Pedro Frazão (Aveiro)
- Maria José Aguiar (Aveiro)
- Armando Grave (Aveiro)
- Pedro Tavares dos Santos (Aveiro)
- Gabriel Mithá Ribeiro (Leiria) – until September 2025
  Rui Fernandes – from September 2025
- Luís Paulo Fernandes (Leiria)
- Cristina Henriques (Leiria)
- Paulo Seco (Coimbra)
- Eliseu Neves (Coimbra)
- Pedro Pinto (Faro)
- João Graça (Faro)
- Sandra Ribeiro (Faro)
- Ricardo Moreira (Faro)
- Pedro Correia (Santarém)
- José Dotti (Santarém)
- Catarina Salgueiro da Costa (Santarém)
- João Tilly (Viseu)
- Bernardo Pessanha (Viseu)
- Francisco Gomes (Madeira)
- Francisco Meneses de Lima (Azores) – until May 2025
  Ana Martins – from May 2025
- Eduardo Teixeira (Viana do Castelo)
- Manuela Tender (Vila Real)
- João Ribeiro (Castelo Branco)
- Rui Cristina (Beja) – until October 2025
  António Carneiro – from October 2025
- Jorge Valsassina Galveias (Évora)
- Nuno Simões de Melo (Guarda)
- João Aleixo (Portalegre)
- José Dias Fernandes (Europe)
- Manuel Magno (Outside Europe)
16th Legislature (2024–2025)
- André Ventura (Lisbon)
- Rui Paulo Sousa (Lisbon)
- Marta Martins da Silva (Lisbon)
- Pedro Pessanha (Lisbon)
- Ricardo Dias Pinto (Lisbon)
- Felicidade Vital (Lisbon)
- Bruno Nunes (Lisbon)
- Madalena Cordeiro (Lisbon)
- José Barreira Soares (Lisbon)
- Rui Afonso (Porto)
- Diogo Pacheco de Amorim (Porto)
- Cristina Rodrigues (Porto)
- José António Carvalho (Porto)
- Marcus Santos (Porto)
- Sónia Monteiro (Porto)
- Raul Melo (Porto)
- Filipe Melo (Braga)
- Rodrigo Alves Taxa (Braga)
- Vanessa Barata (Braga)
- Carlos Alberto Pinto (Braga)
- Rita Matias (Setúbal)
- Patrícia de Carvalho (Setúbal)
- Nuno Gabriel (Setúbal)
- Daniel Teixeira (Setúbal)
- Jorge Valsassina Galveias (Aveiro)
- Maria José Aguiar (Aveiro)
- Armando Grave (Aveiro)
- Gabriel Mithá Ribeiro (Leiria)
- Luís Paulo Fernandes (Leiria)
- António Pinto Pereira (Coimbra)
- Eliseu Neves (Coimbra)
- Pedro Pinto (Faro)
- João Graça (Faro)
- Sandra Ribeiro (Faro)
- Pedro Frazão (Santarém)
- Pedro Correia (Santarém)
- Luísa Costa Macedo (Santarém)
- João Tilly (Viseu)
- Bernardo Pessanha (Viseu)
- Francisco Gomes (Madeira)
- Miguel Arruda (Azores) – became independent in January 2025
- Eduardo Teixeira (Viana do Castelo)
- Manuela Tender (Vila Real)
- João Ribeiro (Castelo Branco)
- Diva Ribeiro (Beja)
- Rui Cristina (Évora)
- Nuno Simões de Melo (Guarda)
- Henrique de Freitas (Portalegre)
- José Dias Fernandes (Europe)
- Manuel Magno (Outside Europe)
15th Legislature (2022–2024)
- André Ventura (Lisbon)
  Sofia Diniz – from November 2023 to November 2023
- Rui Paulo Sousa (Lisbon)
  Luís Pereira – from November 2023 to November 2023
- Rita Matias (Lisbon)
- Pedro Pessanha (Lisbon)
- Rui Afonso (Porto)
- Diogo Pacheco de Amorim (Porto)
- Filipe Melo (Braga)
  Rodrigo Alves Taxa – from November 2023 to November 2023
- Rita Matias (Setúbal)
- Jorge Valsassina Galveias (Aveiro)
- Gabriel Mithá Ribeiro (Leiria)
- Pedro Pinto (Faro)
- Pedro Frazão (Santarém)
14th Legislature (2019–2022)
- André Ventura (Lisbon)
  Diogo Pacheco de Amorim – from September 2021 to October 2021

==== Members of the European Parliament ====
10th Legislature (2024 – present)
- António Tânger Corrêa
- Tiago Moreira de Sá

=== International affiliation and relations ===
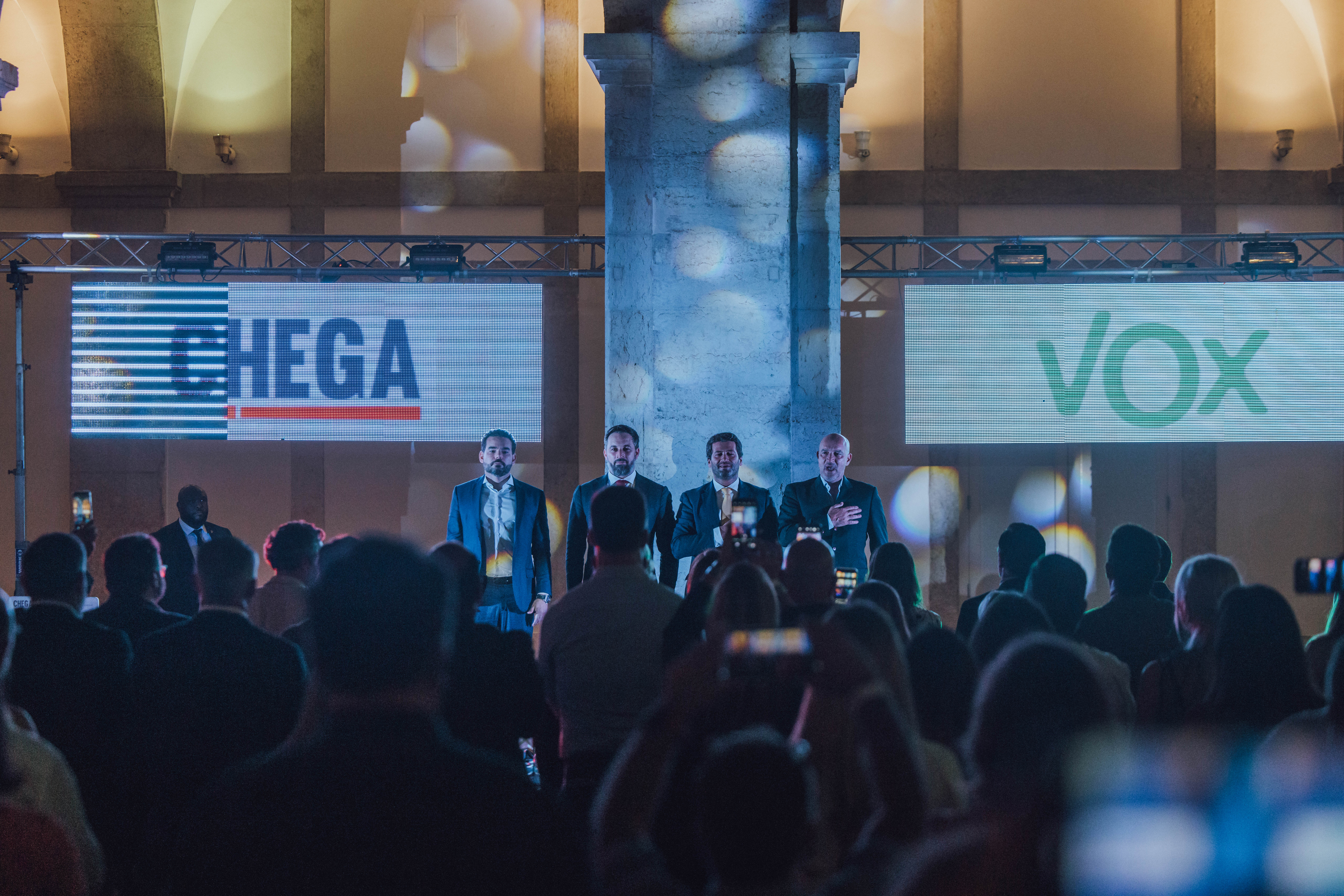
Chega holding a joint event with the Spanish political party Vox in 2021

Chega maintains close links with Vox, a similar party in neighbouring Spain. In July 2020, Chega joined the European far-right Identity and Democracy Party, where its allies included the National Rally (France), Lega (Italy) and the Alternative for Germany. The party has the mutual support of Jair Bolsonaro, the former President of Brazil.

== Election results ==
=== Assembly of the Republic ===
Vote share in the Portuguese legislative elections

Election	Leader	Votes	%	Seats	+/-	Government
2019	André Ventura	67,826	1.3 (#7)	1 / 230	New	Opposition
2022	André Ventura	399,659	7.2 (#3)	12 / 230	▲11	Opposition
2024	André Ventura	1,169,781	18.1 (#3)	50 / 230	▲38	Opposition
2025	André Ventura	1,438,554	22.8 (#2)	60 / 230	▲10	Opposition

=== Presidential ===
Election	Candidate	First round		Second round		Result
Election	Candidate	Votes	%	Votes	%	Result
2021	André Ventura	493,162	11.9 (#3)			Lost ✗
2026	André Ventura	1,327,021	23.5 (#2)	1,737,950	33.2 (#2)	Lost ✗

=== European Parliament ===
Election	Leader	Votes	%	Seats	+/–	EP Group
2019	André Ventura	Basta!		0 / 21	New	–
2024	António Tânger Corrêa	387,068	9.8 (#3)	2 / 21	▲2	PfE

=== Local elections ===
Election	Leader	Votes	%	Mayors	+/-	Councillors	+/-	Assemblies	+/-	Parishes	+/-	Parish Assemblies	+/-
2021	André Ventura	208,232	4.2 (#5)	0 / 308		19 / 2,064		173 / 6,448		0 / 3,066		205 / 26,797	
2025	André Ventura	653,943	11.9 (#3)	3 / 308	▲3	137 / 2,058	▲118	635 / 6,463	▲462	13 / 3,216	▲13	1,175 / 27,973	▲970

=== Regional elections ===
Region	Election	Leader	Votes	%	Seats	+/-	Government
Azores	2024	José Pacheco	10,626	9.2 (#3)	5 / 57	▲3	Opposition
Madeira	2025	Miguel Castro	7,821	5.5 (#4)	3 / 47	▼1	Opposition

Azorean regional elections

Election	Leader	Votes	%	Seats	+/-	Government
2020	Carlos Furtado	5,262	5.1 (#4)	2 / 57	New	Confidence and supply
2024	José Pacheco	10,626	9.2 (#3)	5 / 57	▲3	Opposition

Madeiran regional elections

Election	Leader	Votes	%	Seats	+/-	Government
2019	Miguel Teixeira	619	0.4 (#13)	0 / 47	New	No seats
2023	Miguel Castro	12,029	8.9 (#4)	4 / 47	▲4	Opposition
2024	Miguel Castro	12,562	9.2 (#4)	4 / 47	0	Opposition
2025	Miguel Castro	7,821	5.5 (#4)	3 / 47	▼1	Opposition

== Public profile ==
=== Critical response ===
Due to its anti-immigration, anti-Islam and populist stances, Chega has been the target of its critics who underline the party's extreme views on various subjects, some of which include the negative comments regarding immigration and minorities, namely the Romani, its opposition to certain aspects of the constitution, its criticism of the judicial leniency regarding serious crimes, and governmental over-expenditure with public services.

The party has also been targeted by critics for reusing a slightly modified version of the motto of the Portuguese dictator António de Oliveira Salazar "Deus, Pátria, Família" (God, Fatherland, Family). The party has been criticized for having supporters of Salazar within their ranks.

The Global Project against Hate and Extremism (GPAHE), an American NGO specialising in the study of extremist movements, warned in a 2023 report that Chega is an "anti-immigrant, anti-women, anti-LGBT, anti-Roma, anti-Muslim and conspiratorial party". The organisation also highlights the presence of numerous white supremacists, identitarians and neo-Nazis in the party's ranks. A subsequent investigatory article by GPAHE found evidence of "more extreme" members in the Chega Youth group, including "white supremacists, fans of former dictator Antonio Salazar, and fascist sympathizers" including the President of the Coimbra branch João Antunes, the leader of the Porto branch Francisco Araujo, and Vila Nova de Famalicão leader Joana Pinto Azevedo.

In a TV debate in 2024, Social Democratic Party (PSD) President Luís Montenegro called Chega leader André Ventura "xenophobic, racist and demagogic".

=== Accusations of racism ===
In response to criticism of the mainstream media, party president André Ventura denounced the accusations of racism against his party, claiming that Chega defends equal rights and duties, and that it "doesn't desire a country on which minorities can believe they have more rights than others simply for being minorities". On 27 June 2020, the party organized a protest entitled "Portugal is not racist", where Ventura further mentioned that there is no structural racism in Portugal, and that the political left uses racism as a pretext to foment political agendas.

== See also ==
- Assembly of the Republic
- List of political parties in Portugal
- Politics of Portugal
