= Pedro Pinto (politician) =

Portuguese politician

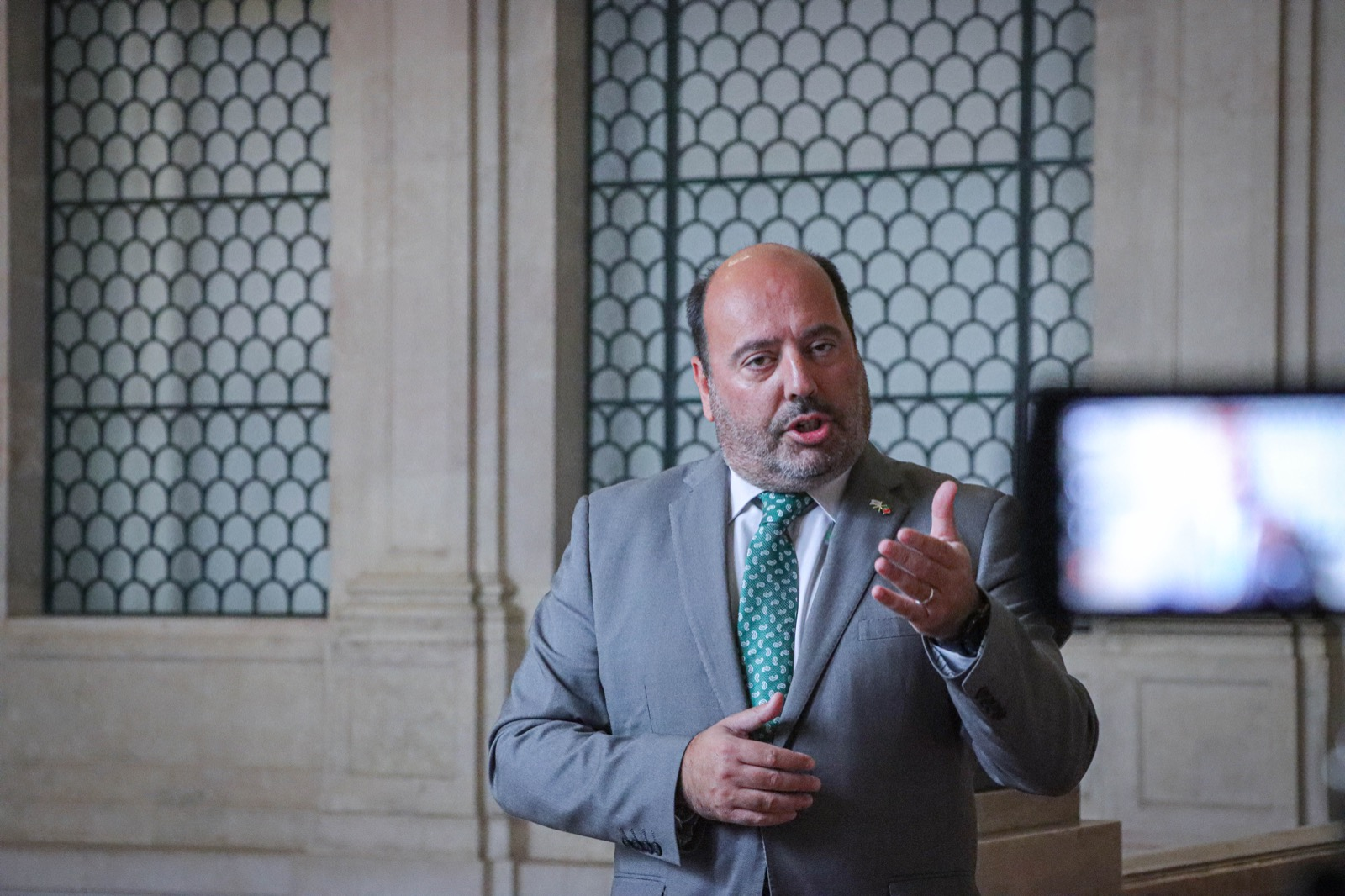

President of the Parliamentary Group of CHEGA
- Incumbent
- Assumed office June 2, 2022
- Preceded by: André Ventura

Member of the Assembly of the Republic
- Incumbent
- Assumed office March 29, 2022
- Constituency: Faro

Personal details
- Born: Pedro Miguel Soares Pinto; 1 July 1977 (age 49) Lisbon, Portugal
- Party: CHEGA (since 2019)
- Other political affiliations: CDS – People's Party (until 2019)
- Education: Universidade Autónoma de Lisboa

Pedro Miguel Soares Pinto (born July 1, 1977) is a Portuguese politician of the Chega party and a member of the Assembly of the Republic for Faro since 2022. He performs the functions of Secretary-General in the party and is part of the inner circle of president André Ventura.

== Biography ==
Pinto was born in Lisbon in 1977. He studied international relations at the Universidade Autónoma de Lisboa, but not completed the studies After graduating, he worked as a journalist and became a director for Ruedo Ibérico magazine. He later founded an events organizing business.

He was initially active in the CDS – People's Party before leaving to join Chega in 2019 and became Chega's district secretary in Beja where he was elected as a municipal councilor in 2020 before transferring to Faro.

For the 2022 Portuguese legislative election, he contested the Faro constituency and was elected to the Assembly of the Republic. In the Assembly he has focused on matters related to immigration and the COVID-19 policy. He is also president of the Chega parliamentary group.

According to the magazine Sábado, Pedro Pinto has made several public references to Estado Novo and praised Salazar.
