= Sandra Ribeiro =

Portuguese politician (born 1973)

Sandra Margarida de Melo Pereira Ribeiro

Member of the Assembly of the Republic
- Incumbent
- Assumed office 26 March 2024
- Constituency: Faro District

Personal details
- Born: 16 March 1973 (age 53) Sacavém, Portugal
- Party: Portuguese: CHEGA
- Occupation: Politician

Sandra Margarida de Melo Pereira Ribeiro (born 1973) is a Portuguese politician. In the 2024 Portuguese national election she was elected to the Assembly of the Republic as a representative of the right-wing CHEGA party.

== Early life and education ==
Ribeiro was born on 16 March 1973 in Sacavém, to the northwest of the Portuguese capital of Lisbon. She obtained a degree in law. Prior to her election she worked for a real estate company.

== Political career ==
Ribeiro joined CHEGA in 2019. Living in Quarteira in the Loulé municipality, she became a member and subsequently mayor of the Loulé municipal council and vice-president of CHEGA in the Faro National Assembly constituency. In the 2024 national election she was third on the CHEGA list of candidates for the constituency, in which the party won three of the nine available seats. Taking her seat in the parliament, she became a member of the Health Committee.

== Controversy ==
In March 2023 the website "Cheganos.com" reported that Ribeiro had advocated violence against the then prime minister, António Costa, in a message to a CHEGA WhatsApp group for the Faro District. On the night of the day of the 2024 election, the online news source SAPO, in its Polígrafo section, said that its fact checking had confirmed the accuracy of that report. It reproduced the message, which appeared to say "hit him on the head with a pebble", and questioned why saying this should not have been an obstacle to her entering the parliament. While not confirming that she had written this message, Ribeiro said that comments on WhatsApp had been the result of frustration with the poor quality of Portuguese medical services.
