= Rita Matias =

Portuguese politician

Rita Maria Cid Matias
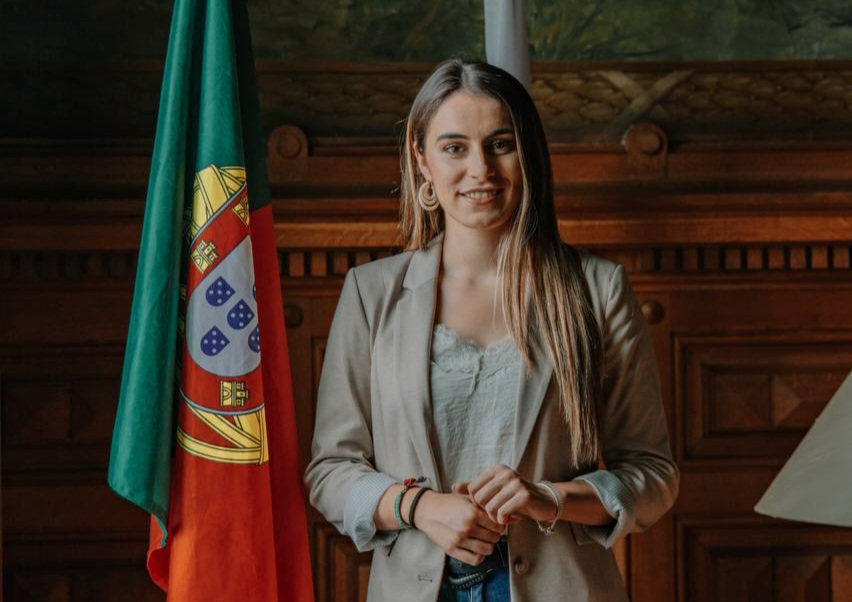
- Rita Matias in 2022

Member of the Assembly of the Republic
- Incumbent
- Assumed office 26 March 2024
- Constituency: Setúbal
- In office 29 March 2022 – 25 March 2024
- Constituency: Lisbon

President of Chega Youth
- Incumbent
- Assumed office 1 January 2021
- Preceded by: Position established

Personal details
- Born: 17 October 1998 (age 27) Setúbal, Portugal
- Party: CH (since 2019)
- Other political affiliations: JP (until 2019)
- Spouse: Hélio Filipe (m. 2025)
- Children: 1
- Education: NOVA University Lisbon; ISCTE – University Institute of Lisbon
- Occupation: Political scientist • Politician

Rita Maria Cid Matias (born 17 October 1998) is a Portuguese political scientist and politician. In the 2022 Portuguese legislative election, she was elected as a deputy in the Assembly of the Republic of Portugal representing the far-right Chega party. She was the only woman out of 12 members of Chega elected in the 2022 Portuguese legislative election, becoming in that year the first female member of the parliament in the history of the party.

== Early life ==
Rita Maria Cid Matias was born on 17 October 1998 in Setúbal and was raised in Seixal. She is the daughter of Manuel Matias, former president of the Citizenship and Christian Democracy Party (PPV), which merged with Chega in 2019. Her mother was born in Mozambique, and her maternal grandmother is a Catholic Goan. Her father has served as a parliamentary advisor to André Ventura, leader of Chega. Rita Matias was awarded an undergraduate degree in political science from ISCTE – University Institute of Lisbon and subsequently enrolled in a master's degree in political science and international relations at NOVA University Lisbon. Her thesis was on Chega's integration into the European right.

== Political views ==
Matias is a practising Catholic who opposes abortion and considers herself a defender of the traditional family. She has called herself an anti-feminist, believing that feminism ignores the "complementarity that can exist between men and women". At the 4th congress of Chega, she said that Portugal is "gagged and imprisoned" by "Marxist webs", crushed by the weight of the State, with a new generation addicted to a "cancel culture" that makes "white males and heterosexuals as oppressors".

== Political career ==
Rita Matias started her political activity as a member of the People's Youth (Juventude Popular), an organ of the CDS – People's Party, a conservative, Christian democratic party. Through her father, she came into contact with Chega, but initially considered it too populist. Changing her views, she joined the party and at its second congress, at the age of 22, was invited to join its seven-person leadership board by the party's leader André Ventura. She took on responsibility for Chega's social networking. In 2021, Matias was a candidate in the municipal elections in Alcochete, to the east of the capital, Lisbon, but was not elected.

Matias has described her political inspiration as coming from the right-wing female politicians, Giorgia Meloni in Italy and Rocío Monasterio in Spain. She leads Chega's youth group, called Juventude Chega. The first attempt to develop this failed as a result of entryism by Neo National Socialism groups. Matias was Chega's spokesperson on youth matters in the 2022 Portuguese legislative election, when she was elected to the National Assembly to represent the Lisbon constituency. She was third on the Chega list of candidates for Lisbon, and the party won four seats in that constituency and 12 overall, making it the third largest party. In her first speech to the Assembly, she focused on issues concerning young people and the cost of student housing in Lisbon. In parliament, she was appointed to the committee on energy and the environment.

== Controversy ==
On 16 June 2024, at a press conference prior to a match in the UEFA Euro 2024 football (soccer) championship, the French footballer Kylian Mbappé, who has Cameroonian and Algerian parents, encouraged young people in France to vote in the 2024 French legislative election in order to combat extremism, saying "I want to be proud to represent France; I don’t want to represent a country that doesn’t correspond to my values, or our values." Playing in France's first match of the tournament, Mbappé broke his nose. Matias responded to this by writing on X (formerly Twitter) "France for the French" and by suggesting that Mbappé had put his nose where it did not belong.
