= Rui Cristina =

Portuguese politician

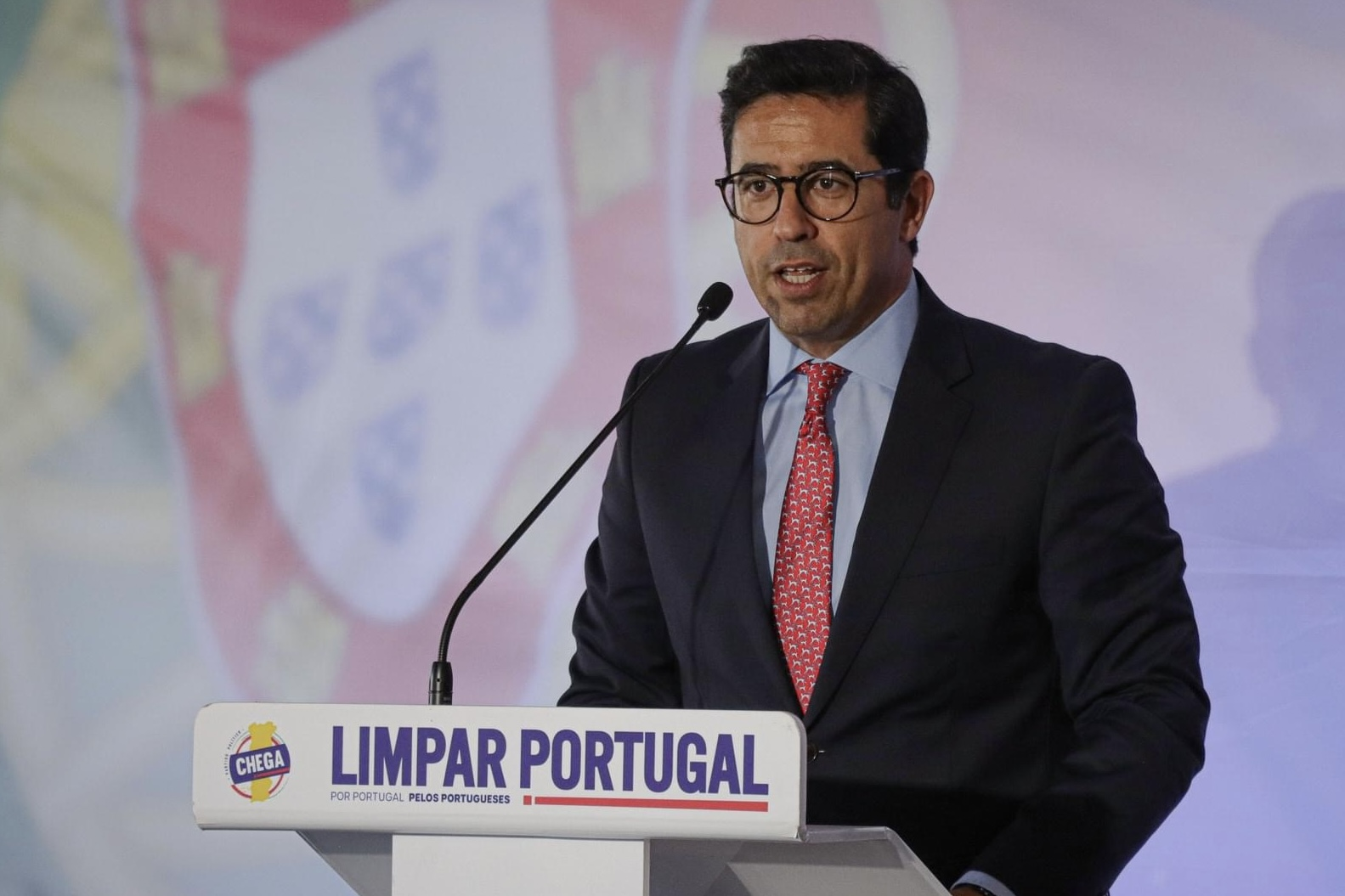
- Rui Cristina in 2024

Mayor of Albufeira
- Incumbent
- Assumed office 3 November 2025
- Preceded by: José Rolo

Member of the Assembly of the Republic
- In office 25 October 2019 – 12 October 2025
- Constituency: Faro (2019–2024); Évora (2024–2025); Beja (2025)

Member of the Loulé City Council
- In office 26 September 2021 – 12 October 2025

Personal details
- Born: Rui Celestino dos Santos Cristina; 19 May 1979 (age 46) Loulé, Portugal
- Party: Chega (2024–present)
- Other political affiliations: Social Democratic Party (2001–2024)
- Children: 1
- Occupation: Civil engineer • Politician

Rui Celestino dos Santos Cristina (born 19 May 1979) is a Portuguese civil engineer and politician.

== Biography ==
He was a member of the Assembly of the Republic in the XIV and XV legislatures for the Social Democratic Party (PSD), elected by Faro. He was elected a member of the Loulé City Council in 2021. In the 2022 PSD leadership election, he supported Jorge Moreira da Silva, who ended up being defeated by Luís Montenegro.

In January 2024, he left the PSD and ended the XV legislature as an independent MP. On 26 January 2024, it was announced by the president of Chega, André Ventura, that he would be head of the list for the Évora constituency in the 2024 legislative elections.

For the 2025 general election, he led the Chega list in the Beja constituency. He was elected as Chega was the most voted party in the district with 27.73%, with the constituency's other two seats going to the Socialist Party and Democratic Alliance leaders.

In the 2025 Portuguese local elections, Cristina was elected mayor of Albufeira after taking 40.51% of the vote and three of seven seats. The result ended PSD and CDS – People's Party governance of the city. He left the Assembly of the Republic, with his seat being given to António Carneiro. Albufeira was one of three municipalities to elect a Chega mayor alongside Entroncamento and São Vicente, Madeira, though the party had aimed for 30.
