= Manuel Magno =

Portuguese-Brazilian lawyer and politician

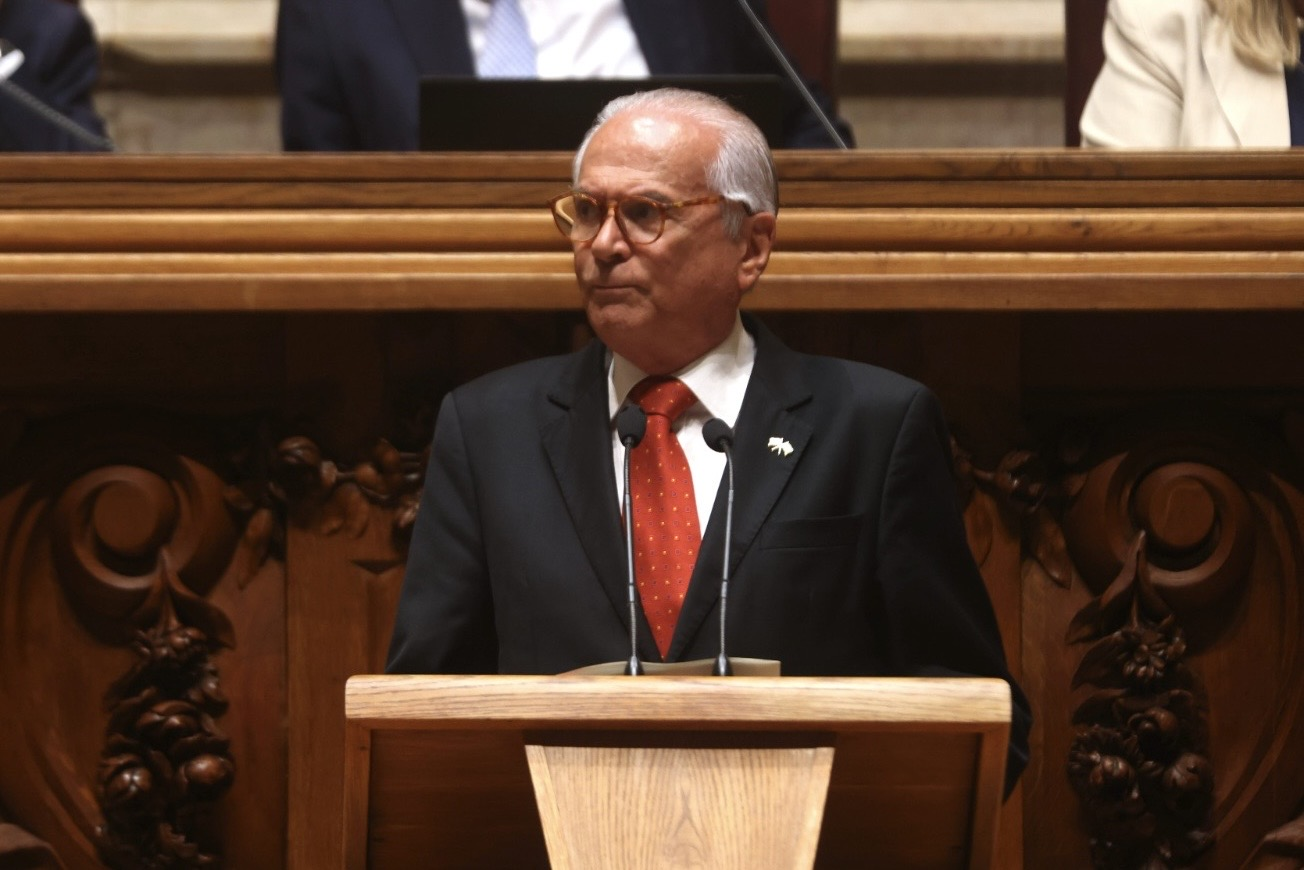
- Magno Alves in 2024

Member of the Assembly of the Republic
- Incumbent
- Assumed office 26 March 2024
- Constituency: Outside Europe

Personal details
- Born: Manuel Magno Alves; 5 March 1948 (age 78) Chaves, Portugal
- Citizenship: Portugal • Brazil
- Party: Chega (2023–present)
- Other political affiliations: Social Democratic Party (until 2023)
- Education: University of São Paulo
- Occupation: Lawyer • Politician

Manuel Magno Alves (born 5 March 1948) is a Portuguese-Brazilian lawyer and politician. Currently, he serves as a member of the Assembly of the Republic, for CHEGA, for the Outside Europe constituency.

== Early life ==
He emigrated to Brazil in 1955, at just 6 years old, and began his studies there, culminating in his degree in Law, in the University of São Paulo.

== Career ==
Magno Alves began his professional career in banking in 1962, in São Paulo. He worked in banking until 1974. From 1974 to 1991, he turned to the real estate area, collaborating in a company that builds popular subdivisions and residences, in some cities in the interior of São Paulo. In 1992, he opened his law office.

Manuel Magno Alves has already held several roles on the Council of the Luso-Brazilian Community of the State of São Paulo and on the Board of Directors of the São Paulo Commercial Association.

== Political career ==
In February 2015, he was elected President of the São Paulo Section of the Portuguese Social Democratic Party. He was the number two candidate for the PSD's Outside Europe circle, in the 2022 legislative elections.

On 20 March 2024, he was elected as a member of the Assembly of the Republic for CHEGA, for the Outside Europe constituency. With his election as MP for this constituency, the CHEGA party ended up avoiding Augusto Santos Silva's re-election, thus making him the first president of the Assembly of the Republic not to be re-elected.
