= Ofélia Ramos =

Portuguese politician

Member of the Assembly of the Republic
- Incumbent
- Assumed office 25 October 2019
- Constituency: Faro

Personal details
- Born: Ofélia Isabel Andrés da Conceição Ramos; 5 July 1970 (age 55) Faro, Portugal
- Party: Social Democratic Party

Ofélia Isabel Andrés da Conceição Ramos (born 5 July 1970) is a Portuguese politician, lawyer and businesswomen. A member of the centre-right Social Democratic Party (PSD), Ramos was elected to the Assembly of the Republic in 2019 as a representative of the Faro constituency and re-elected in 2022 and 2024.

== Early life and education ==
Ofélia Isabel Andrés da Conceição Ramos was born on 5 July 1970. She obtained a master's degree in administrative law.

== Career ==
Before being elected to the Assembly of the Republic, Ramos held a number of positions in Faro and the Algarve region of Portugal. In 2003 and 2004 she represented the Portuguese Youth Institute in Faro. Between 2004 and 2006 she was a member of the board of directors of the Faro district hospital and chairman of the board of directors of the regional conservatory, Algarve Maria Campina, a school specialized in music and dance. Between 2011 and 2016 she was director of the Social Security Institute of the Algarve and from 2016 she was, first, head of the Division of Legal Advice, Supervision and Administrative Offences and then director of the Department of Legal Affairs and Litigation of Faro municipality. Ramos is also the director of two companies.

== Political career ==
Ramos was first elected to the Assembly of the Republic in the 2019 election for the Faro constituency. In her first term she sat on the Committee on Constitutional Affairs, Rights, Freedoms and Guarantees. She was re-elected in the January 2022 election, called after the collapse of the governing coalition under António Costa of the Socialist Party, when the left-wing coalition partners refused to support the budget. As in 2019, she was third on the PSD list for Faro and her party won three of the nine seats available for the constituency. She is also president of the PSD in Faro.
