= Luís Saias =

Portuguese politician (1924–2023)

Minister of Agriculture
- In office 30 January 1978 – 29 August 1978
- Preceded by: Álvaro Barreto
- Succeeded by: Apolinário Vaz Portugal

Member of the Assembly of the Republic of Portugal
- In office 3 January 1980 – 30 May 1983
- Constituency: Porto's Electoral Circle

Personal details
- Born: Luís Silvério Gonçalves Saias; 1924
- Died: 20 June 2023 (aged 98) Lisbon, Portugal
- Party: PS

Luís Silvério Gonçalves Saias (1924 – 20 June 2023) was a Portuguese politician. A member of the Socialist Party, he served as Minister of Agriculture in 1978 and was a member of the Assembly of the Republic from 1980 to 1983.

Saias died in Lisbon on 20 June 2023, at the age of 98.
