= Universidade Portucalense Infante D. Henrique =

Portuguese university

Coordinates: 41°10′48″N 8°36′25″W

Portucalense University Infante D. Henrique (UPT)
- Universidade Portucalense Infante D. Henrique (UPT)
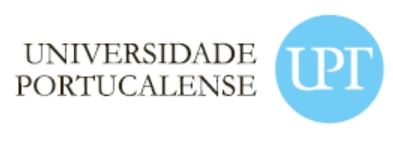
- Type: Private
- Established: 1986
- Rector: Sebastião Feyo de Azevedo
- Address: Rua Dr. António Bernardino de Almeida, 541, 4200-072, Porto, Portugal
- Website: www-en.upt.pt

Portucalense Infante D. Henrique University (UPT) (Portuguese: Universidade Portucalense Infante D. Henrique, UPT) is a private university in Porto, Portugal.
