= Margarida Tengarrinha =

Portuguese teacher, writer and communist activist (1928–2023)

- Born: 7 May 1928; Portimão, Algarve, Portugal
- Died: 26 October 2023 (aged 95); Portimão, Algarve, Portugal
- Known for: Activities in opposition to the Estado Novo regime in Portugal.
- Notable work: Memórias de uma falsificadora (Memories of a counterfeiter)

Margarida Tengarrinha (7 May 1928 – 26 October 2023) was a Portuguese teacher, writer, artist and illustrator. As a member of the Portuguese Communist Party (PCP) she was active as an opponent of the authoritarian Estado Novo regime that governed Portugal between 1926 and 1974, playing a role in document forging and publication of the Party's magazine Avante!. She spent two years in Moscow with the future leader of the PCP, Álvaro Cunhal, and then worked in Bucharest, Romania on a radio station broadcasting to Portugal. After the overthrow of the regime, she became a deputy in the Assembly of the Republic. She later wrote memoirs, taught at a Senior University, illustrated books and exhibited works of art.

== Early life ==
Maria Margarida Carmo Tengarrinha Campos Costa was born in Portimão in the Algarve region of Portugal on 7 May 1928. Her father was a bank manager and a leading member of Portimão's middle class. Her grandfather had been a civil engineer, responsible for constructing the road between Lisbon and the Algarve. An early memory was the 18 January 1934 revolt by workers against the closure of unions by the Estado Novo regime. Previously unionised fish canners, metalworkers and agricultural workers went on strike and, from the window of her house, she saw their demonstration being attacked by government forces. The first demonstration in which she participated was on 8 May 1945, Victory in Europe Day. Although Portugal remained neutral during World War II, many demonstrators saw the Allied victory as a defeat for the Estado Novo, which they considered to be fascist.

== Early activism ==
Tengarrinha joined the youth branch of the Movement of Democratic Unity (Portuguese: Movimento de Unidade Democrática or MUD), a quasi-legal platform of democratic organizations that opposed the Estado Novo. At the time she was attending the Escola Superior de Belas-Artes de Lisboa – ESBAL, (School of Fine Arts), which is now integrated into the University of Lisbon, and became an organizer of that college's participation in MUD. Her activities included campaigning against nuclear weapons and demanding that Portugal leave NATO, with demonstrations in Lisbon in February 1952 during a NATO meeting in the city. This led to her expulsion from ESBAL in mid-1952, together with 81 other students. As one of the leaders she, together with her future husband, the communist artist José Dias Coelho, and António Alfredo Paiva Nunes, was expelled, forbidden to attend all colleges in the country and prevented from teaching at the school where she was working. That year she became a member of the Portuguese Communist Party (PCP).

Without a source of income, Tengarrinha approached the feminist activist Maria Lamas who had recently ceased to be editor of Modas e Bordados (Fashions and embroidery), a weekly magazine published with the O Século daily newspaper. Lamas helped Tengarrinha to join the magazine, where she wrote articles with several pseudonyms and did drawings. She also worked with Lamas on women's issues, on a committee that included Maria Antónia Palla. The World Congress of Women was held in Copenhagen in June 1953 and Tengarrinha was involved in writing a speech for Maria Lamas.

== Going underground ==
Tengarrinha went into hiding with Coelho in early 1955, not to escape the secret police but because the PCP considered that their artistic skills could be useful in producing counterfeit documents. As well as producing fake IDs and passports, the couple provided an important focal point for PCP members trying to escape detection. She also produced a bulletin aimed at female PCP members, called A Voz das Camaradas (Voice of Comrades). Early in 1961 she ceased counterfeiting work and joined the staff of Avante!, the Communist Party magazine. On 19 December 1961, Coelho was murdered by the PIDE or International and State Defence Police, (Portuguese: Polícia Internacional e de Defesa do Estado). They had two daughters, Teresa and Guidinha.

== Moscow and Bucharest ==
Between 1962 and 1964 Tengarrinha was in Moscow, working with the Portuguese communist leader, Álvaro Cunhal, and collaborating on his 300-page book Rumo à Vitória – As tarefas do Partido na Revolução Democrática e Nacional. She then moved to Bucharest in Romania, where she was editor of Rádio Portugal Livre, a PCP radio station broadcasting to Portugal. But, despite the personal dangers, she had a strong desire to return to Portugal, which she did in 1968, again going into hiding and working for the PCP, initially in Lisbon and then in Porto. She also resumed working with Avante! At this time three identical plates for printing the magazine were made. One was for the Lisbon printing press, one for the printing press in the north of Portugal, and one was kept at her house. On moving to Porto she collaborated in the production of A Terra, a publication aimed at farmers. In 1972 she organized a demonstration attended by 40,000 in Porto in opposition to the Portuguese Colonial War.

== After the Carnation Revolution ==
After the Carnation Revolution in April 1974, which overthrew the Estado Novo, Tengarrinha returned to Lisbon in 1975, where she worked with the PCP on agricultural policy issues, such as agrarian reform. She became a member of the Central Committee of the PCP, campaigning for the inclusion of more women, and a PCP deputy for the Algarve in the third and fourth legislatures of the Assembly of the Republic between 1979 and 1983.

== Later life and death ==
Tengarrinha wrote and illustrated several books. She was a keen artist and exhibited at several exhibitions. She also taught art at the Senior University of Portimão. She was the first recipient of the Maria Veleda Award, from the Algarve Regional Directorate for Culture, in 2016. The Award is for contributions to Gender Equality, Citizenship and Non-discrimination in the Algarve, as well as for cultural contributions.

Margarida Tengarrinha died on 26 October 2023, at the age of 95.

== Publications ==
As writer

- 1990 – Samora Barros: Pintor do Algarve (Samora Barros: Painter of the Algarve)
- 1999 – Da Memória do Povo (From the memory of the people: collection of the oral tradition of the municipality of Portimão) [4]
- 2004 – Quadros da Memória (Paintings of Memory)
- 2006 – A Resistência em Portugal (Resistance in Portugal – written with José Dias Coelho) was written after a suggestion by Álvaro Cunhal, who stayed with Tengarrinha and Coelho after escaping from the Estado Novo prison at Peniche Fortress. The book was first published in Brazil under the pseudonym of "Amílcar Gomes Duarte", drawn from the pseudonyms of the three most well-known PCP leaders. Amílcar was the pseudonym of Sérgio Vilarigues, Gomes was Pires Jorge and Duarte was Álvaro Cunhal. Later, the book was published in Moscow under the name of Coelho, who was also credited as the author in the 2006 edition published by the PCP, despite the fact that they shared writing duties.
- 2018 – Memórias de uma falsificadora (Memories of a counterfeiter) describes how, while in hiding, she falsified identification documents. Together with José Dias Coelho, she created a document forgery workshop for the Communist Party's members.

As illustrator

- 1999 – Um Algarve outro, contado de boca em boca: estórias, ditos, mezinhas, adivinhas e o mais (Another Algarve, told by word of mouth: stories, sayings, mezinhas, riddles and more) by Glória Marreiros
- 2015 – Leonor Leonoreta : ensaio de ternura : novela poética (Leonor Leonoreta: essay of tenderness, poetic novel), by Filipe Chinita.
