= Porto Femme International Film Festival =

Film festival in Porto, Portugal for films directed by women

The Porto Femme International Film Festival is an annual international film festival that aims to highlight, showcase, and publicize the work of artists and directors who identify as women. The film festival is held in Porto, Portugal.

== History ==
In 2016, the XX Element Project - Cultural Association was created with the goal to promote artistic works created by women and enrich the development of cultural, civil, and social activities through a gendered lens, while emphasizing women's right and gender equality. The association created "privileged spaces of dissemination of these works, where the main focus will be the cinema."

== 2020 ==
The 3rd edition of the Porto Femme - International Film Festival took place between October 6 through October 10. It took place virtually and in person at the Cinema Trindade, at Maus Hábitos- Espaço de Intervenção Cultural, and at Zero Lodge Box Porto. It screened over 120 films from 39 countries. It also saw the introduction of the thematic competition. That years edition also included tributes to Anna Karina, Fernanda Lapa, Isabel Ruth, and Ana Corderio. Originally, the 3rd edition of the festival was supposed to take place between June 16 through June 20. Due to the COVID-19 pandemic, the festival was postponed and reschedule for the October dates.

== 2019 ==
The 2nd edition of the Porto Femme - International Film Festival took place between June 18 through June 22. The festival took place throughout different spaces in the city including the Auditorium of the Almeida Garrett Library, Cinema Trindade, Selina Porto and Maus Hábitos. Over 110 films from 32 countries were screened. That years addition also saw the addition of the student competition. The jury members for the International Competition included Ana Catrina Pereira, Jaime Neves, Raquel Freire, Çağla Harputlu, Deniz şengenç, and Pedro Neves. The jury for the National and XX Competition included Carla Sequeira, Patrícia Nogueira, and Raquel Felgueiras. The jury for the Student Competition included Anabela Oliveira, Beste Yamalıoğlu, and Luísa Sequeira. The jury for the Women's Struggle and Rights Award included Maria José Magalhães, Patrícia Martins, and Sónia de Sá. A group exhibition by Clara Não and Cara Trancada, a project that arises from the need to deconstruct taboos in relation to sexuality, opened on June 19 and lasted through the 30th. The program also included two workshops. The workshop for film directors focused the various issues associated with the process of making a film, from the writing phase to its completion. It was held by Raquel Freire. Workshop The Camera and the Actor was held by Inês Oliveira.
