= Portuguese Communities Council =

- Conselho das Comunidades Portuguesas
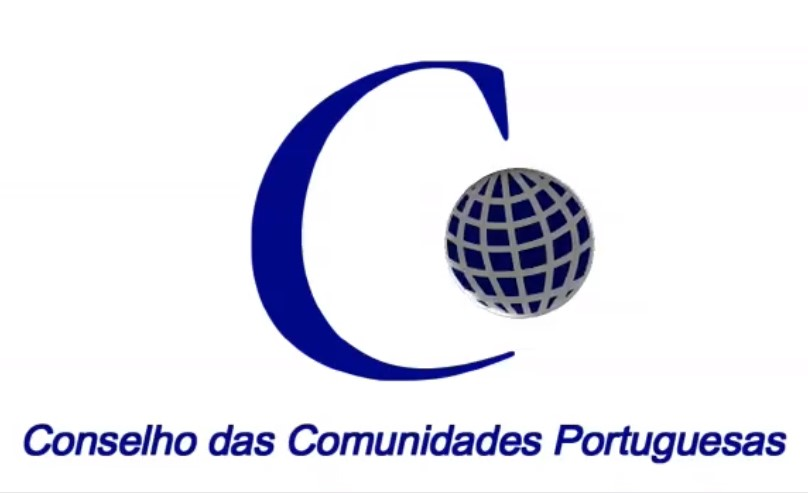

Council overview
- Formed: 12 September 1980
- Jurisdiction: Government of Portugal
- Minister responsible: José Cesário, Secretary of State for the Portuguese Communities
- Website: www.conselhodascomunidades.pt

The Portuguese Communities Council (Portuguese: Conselho das Comunidades Portuguesas) is the Portuguese government's advisory body on policies relating to emigration and the Portuguese communities abroad.

The Council is made up of a maximum of 90 members, elected by Portuguese citizens living abroad. The last election was held on 26 November 2023.

The Regional Council of the Portuguese Communities in Europe, a regional body of the Council, are demanding the Government of Portugal, introduce online voting for the next Portuguese presidential election.

== Election results ==
=== 2023 results ===
On 13 September 2023, Secretary of State for the Portuguese Communities, Paulo Cafôfo, called for elections to take place on 26 November 2023. This election was delayed by the previous Secretary of State, Berta Nunes, due to the COVID-19 pandemic and the Government wanting to reform the Council. The election resulted in 76 conselheiros being elected. 26 of which being female, meeting the 34% quota, now required following changes to the Council by the Secretary of State.

Results per constituency
Constituency (Number of Conselheiros)	Country	Consulate	Consular office	Electors	Votes	Number of Invalid Votes	Elected Conselheiros (List)
África do Sul - Joanesburgo e Pretória (3)	South Africa	Johannesburg	Johannesburg	23,601	49	0	1. Vasco Pinto de Abreu (A); 2. Elizabete Conceição Antunes Gomes Serrão (A); 3. Alexandre dos Santos (A)
África do Sul - Joanesburgo e Pretória (3)	South Africa	Johannesburg	Durban	2,232	49	0	1. Vasco Pinto de Abreu (A); 2. Elizabete Conceição Antunes Gomes Serrão (A); 3. Alexandre dos Santos (A)
África do Sul - Joanesburgo e Pretória (3)	Botswana	Johannesburg	Gaborone	47	49	0	1. Vasco Pinto de Abreu (A); 2. Elizabete Conceição Antunes Gomes Serrão (A); 3. Alexandre dos Santos (A)
África do Sul - Joanesburgo e Pretória (3)	Lesotho	Johannesburg	Maseru	1	49	0	1. Vasco Pinto de Abreu (A); 2. Elizabete Conceição Antunes Gomes Serrão (A); 3. Alexandre dos Santos (A)
África do Sul - Joanesburgo e Pretória (3)	Madagascar	Johannesburg	Antananarivo	2	49	0	1. Vasco Pinto de Abreu (A); 2. Elizabete Conceição Antunes Gomes Serrão (A); 3. Alexandre dos Santos (A)
África do Sul - Joanesburgo e Pretória (3)	South Africa	Pretoria	Pretoria	2,485	49	0	1. Vasco Pinto de Abreu (A); 2. Elizabete Conceição Antunes Gomes Serrão (A); 3. Alexandre dos Santos (A)
África do Sul - Joanesburgo e Pretória (3)	Comoros	Pretoria	Moroni	0	49	0	1. Vasco Pinto de Abreu (A); 2. Elizabete Conceição Antunes Gomes Serrão (A); 3. Alexandre dos Santos (A)
África do Sul - Cabo (1)	South Africa	Cape Town		4,144	20	0	1. Rui Manuel Rodrigues dos Santos (A)
Alemanha - Dusseldorf, Hamburgo e Berlim (2)	Germany	Berlin		5,870	253	2	1. Manuel Machado (C); 2. António Horta (B)
Alemanha - Dusseldorf, Hamburgo e Berlim (2)	Germany	Dusseldorf		27,528	253	2	1. Manuel Machado (C); 2. António Horta (B)
Alemanha - Dusseldorf, Hamburgo e Berlim (2)	Germany	Hamburg	Hamburg	14,450	253	2	1. Manuel Machado (C); 2. António Horta (B)
Alemanha - Dusseldorf, Hamburgo e Berlim (2)	Germany	Hamburg	Osnabruck	98	253	2	1. Manuel Machado (C); 2. António Horta (B)
Alemanha - Estugarda (Varsóvia, Praga, Bratislava) (2)	Germany	Stuttgart	Stuttgart	28,862	47	3	1. Mário Lopes da Silva Botas (C); 2. Maria Cândida Pereira de Melo (B)
Alemanha - Estugarda (Varsóvia, Praga, Bratislava) (2)	Germany	Stuttgart	Munich	12	47	3	1. Mário Lopes da Silva Botas (C); 2. Maria Cândida Pereira de Melo (B)
Alemanha - Estugarda (Varsóvia, Praga, Bratislava) (2)	Germany	Stuttgart	Frankfurt	164	47	3	1. Mário Lopes da Silva Botas (C); 2. Maria Cândida Pereira de Melo (B)
Alemanha - Estugarda (Varsóvia, Praga, Bratislava) (2)	Czechia	Prague		696	47	3	1. Mário Lopes da Silva Botas (C); 2. Maria Cândida Pereira de Melo (B)
Alemanha - Estugarda (Varsóvia, Praga, Bratislava) (2)	Poland	Warsaw		1,125	47	3	1. Mário Lopes da Silva Botas (C); 2. Maria Cândida Pereira de Melo (B)
Alemanha - Estugarda (Varsóvia, Praga, Bratislava) (2)	Slovakia	Bratislava		122	47	3	1. Mário Lopes da Silva Botas (C); 2. Maria Cândida Pereira de Melo (B)
Andorra (1)	Andorra			7,694	70	6	1. Rui Miguel Araújo Fernandes (A)
Angola (Kinshasa, Malabo) (1)	Angola	Luanda		13,635	22	10	1. Diogo José dos Reis Barbosa Marques Leal (A)
Angola (Kinshasa, Malabo) (1)	Angola	Benguela		2,965	22	10	1. Diogo José dos Reis Barbosa Marques Leal (A)
Angola (Kinshasa, Malabo) (1)	DR Congo	Kinshasa	Kinshasa	139	22	10	1. Diogo José dos Reis Barbosa Marques Leal (A)
Angola (Kinshasa, Malabo) (1)	Central African Republic	Kinshasa	Bangui	5	22	10	1. Diogo José dos Reis Barbosa Marques Leal (A)
Angola (Kinshasa, Malabo) (1)	Congo	Kinshasa	Brazzaville	33	22	10	1. Diogo José dos Reis Barbosa Marques Leal (A)
Angola (Kinshasa, Malabo) (1)	Uganda	Kinshasa	Kampala	50	22	10	1. Diogo José dos Reis Barbosa Marques Leal (A)
Angola (Kinshasa, Malabo) (1)	Burundi	Kinshasa	Bujumbura	2	22	10	1. Diogo José dos Reis Barbosa Marques Leal (A)
Angola (Kinshasa, Malabo) (1)	Equatorial Guinea	Malabo		10	22	10	1. Diogo José dos Reis Barbosa Marques Leal (A)
Argentina (Santiago do Chile, Lima) (1)	Argentina	Buenos Aires	Buenos Aires	6,601	119	5	1. Martin Fabian d’Oliveira (A)
Argentina (Santiago do Chile, Lima) (1)	Argentina	Buenos Aires	Comodoro Rivadavia	400	119	5	1. Martin Fabian d’Oliveira (A)
Argentina (Santiago do Chile, Lima) (1)	Argentina	Buenos Aires	Club Português Buenos Aires	42	119	5	1. Martin Fabian d’Oliveira (A)
Argentina (Santiago do Chile, Lima) (1)	Argentina	Buenos Aires	Rosario	73	119	5	1. Martin Fabian d’Oliveira (A)
Argentina (Santiago do Chile, Lima) (1)	Paraguay	Buenos Aires	Asunción	79	119	5	1. Martin Fabian d’Oliveira (A)
Argentina (Santiago do Chile, Lima) (1)	Peru	Lima	Lima	543	119	5	1. Martin Fabian d’Oliveira (A)
Argentina (Santiago do Chile, Lima) (1)	Bolivia	Lima	La Paz	22	119	5	1. Martin Fabian d’Oliveira (A)
Argentina (Santiago do Chile, Lima) (1)	Chile	Santiago de Chile		1,921	119	5	1. Martin Fabian d’Oliveira (A)
Austrália - Sidney e Camberra (Jacarta) (1)	Australia	Canberra	Canberra	160	No candidate stood for election		
Austrália - Sidney e Camberra (Jacarta) (1)	New Zealand	Canberra	Nukunonu	0	No candidate stood for election		
Austrália - Sidney e Camberra (Jacarta) (1)	Tonga	Canberra	Nuku'alofa	0	No candidate stood for election		
Austrália - Sidney e Camberra (Jacarta) (1)	Pitcairn Islands	Canberra	Adamstown	0	No candidate stood for election		
Austrália - Sidney e Camberra (Jacarta) (1)	Niue	Canberra	Alofi	0	No candidate stood for election		
Austrália - Sidney e Camberra (Jacarta) (1)	Cook Islands	Canberra	Avarua	0	No candidate stood for election		
Austrália - Sidney e Camberra (Jacarta) (1)	New Zealand	Canberra	Auckland	251	No candidate stood for election		
Austrália - Sidney e Camberra (Jacarta) (1)	New Zealand	Canberra	Wellington	0	No candidate stood for election		
Austrália - Sidney e Camberra (Jacarta) (1)	Vanuatu	Canberra	Port Vila	8	No candidate stood for election		
Austrália - Sidney e Camberra (Jacarta) (1)	Tuvalu	Canberra	Funafuti	0	No candidate stood for election		
Austrália - Sidney e Camberra (Jacarta) (1)	Samoa	Canberra	Apia	0	No candidate stood for election		
Austrália - Sidney e Camberra (Jacarta) (1)	Papua New Guinea	Canberra	Port Moresby	0	No candidate stood for election		
Austrália - Sidney e Camberra (Jacarta) (1)	Palau	Canberra	Ngerulmud	0	No candidate stood for election		
Austrália - Sidney e Camberra (Jacarta) (1)	Nauru	Canberra	Yaren	0	No candidate stood for election		
Austrália - Sidney e Camberra (Jacarta) (1)	Micronesia	Canberra	Palikir	0	No candidate stood for election		
Austrália - Sidney e Camberra (Jacarta) (1)	Kiribati	Canberra	Tarawa	0	No candidate stood for election		
Austrália - Sidney e Camberra (Jacarta) (1)	Solomon Islands	Canberra	Honiara	0	No candidate stood for election		
Austrália - Sidney e Camberra (Jacarta) (1)	Marshall Islands	Canberra	Majuro	2	No candidate stood for election		
Austrália - Sidney e Camberra (Jacarta) (1)	Fiji	Canberra	Suva	3	No candidate stood for election		
Austrália - Sidney e Camberra (Jacarta) (1)	Australia	Sydney	Sydney	3,214	No candidate stood for election		
Austrália - Sidney e Camberra (Jacarta) (1)	Australia	Sydney	Brisbane	603	No candidate stood for election		
Austrália - Sidney e Camberra (Jacarta) (1)	Indonesia	Jakarta	Jakarta	64	No candidate stood for election		
Austrália - Sidney e Camberra (Jacarta) (1)	Philippines	Jakarta	Manila	64	No candidate stood for election		
Austrália - Sidney e Camberra (Jacarta) (1)	Brunei	Jakarta	Bandar Seri Begawan	8	No candidate stood for election		
Austrália - Melbourne (1)	Australia	Sydney	Melbourne	1,028	141	1	1. Sara Freitas Fernandes (B)
Austrália - Melbourne (1)	Australia	Sydney	Adelaide	203	141	1	1. Sara Freitas Fernandes (B)
Austrália - Melbourne (1)	Australia	Sydney	Fremantle/Perth	864	141	1	1. Sara Freitas Fernandes (B)
Austrália - Melbourne (1)	Australia	Sydney	Darwin	152	141	1	1. Sara Freitas Fernandes (B)
Bélgica (1)	Belgium	Brussels	Brussels	17,760	No candidate stood for election		
Bélgica (1)	Belgium	Brussels	Antwerp	8	No candidate stood for election		
Bélgica (1)	Belgium	Brussels	Liège	1	No candidate stood for election		
Brasil - Brasília (1)	Brazil	Brasilia	Brasilia	5,560	No candidate stood for election		
Brasil - Brasília (1)	Brazil	Brasilia	Goiânia	1,325	No candidate stood for election		
Brasil - Belém (1)	Brazil	Belém of Pará	Belém	5,175	875	3	1. Luis Octávio Rei Monteiro (B)
Brasil - Belém (1)	Brazil	Belém of Pará	Manaus	2,055	875	3	1. Luis Octávio Rei Monteiro (B)
Brasil - Belém (1)	Brazil	Belém of Pará	São Luís do Maranhão	750	875	3	1. Luis Octávio Rei Monteiro (B)
Brasil - Belo Horizonte (1)	Brazil	Belo Horizonte	Belo Horizonte	8,252	No candidate stood for election		
Brasil - Curítiba e Porto Alegre (1)	Brazil	Curitiba	Curitiba	5,784	83	3	1. António Davide Santos da Graça (A)
Brasil - Curítiba e Porto Alegre (1)	Brazil	Curitiba	Londrina	3,063	83	3	1. António Davide Santos da Graça (A)
Brasil - Curítiba e Porto Alegre (1)	Brazil	Porto Alegre		3,299	83	3	1. António Davide Santos da Graça (A)
Brasil - Recife e Salvador (1)	Brazil	Recife	Recife	4,188	107	0	1. José Miranda Reis de Melo (A)
Brasil - Recife e Salvador (1)	Brazil	Recife	Natal	513	107	0	1. José Miranda Reis de Melo (A)
Brasil - Recife e Salvador (1)	Brazil	Salvador (Bahia)	Salvador (Bahia)	2,757	107	0	1. José Miranda Reis de Melo (A)
Brasil - Recife e Salvador (1)	Brazil	Salvador (Bahia)	Porto Seguro	0	107	0	1. José Miranda Reis de Melo (A)
Brasil - Fortaleza (1)	Brazil	Fortaleza		2,511	39	0	1. José Augusto Pinto Wahnom (A)
Brasil - Rio de Janeiro (3)	Brazil	Rio de Janeiro	Rio de Janeiro	87,813	384	1	1. Flávio Alves Martins (A); 2. Roselene Silva Pires de Boaventura (A); 3. Orlando Cerveira Francisco (A)
Brasil - Rio de Janeiro (3)	Brazil	Rio de Janeiro	Vitória	1,823	384	1	1. Flávio Alves Martins (A); 2. Roselene Silva Pires de Boaventura (A); 3. Orlando Cerveira Francisco (A)
Brasil - Rio de Janeiro (3)	Brazil	Rio de Janeiro	Niterói	0	384	1	1. Flávio Alves Martins (A); 2. Roselene Silva Pires de Boaventura (A); 3. Orlando Cerveira Francisco (A)
Brasil - São Paulo (4)	Brazil	São Paulo	São Paulo	107,552	115	1	1. Teresa de Jesus Pires Morgado (A); 2. António Carlos dos Santos Gomes (A); 3. Beatriz Neves Guedes Pereira (A); 4. Armandino Oliveira Guerra Torrão (A)
Brasil - São Paulo (4)	Brazil	São Paulo	Campo Grande	1,336	115	1	1. Teresa de Jesus Pires Morgado (A); 2. António Carlos dos Santos Gomes (A); 3. Beatriz Neves Guedes Pereira (A); 4. Armandino Oliveira Guerra Torrão (A)
Brasil - Santos (1)	Brazil	São Paulo	Santos	12,479	337	1	1. Jose Duarte de Almeida Alves (A)
Cabo Verde (1)	Cape Verde	Praia	Praia	3,188	11	6	1. Jose João Correia Nóbrega Ascenso (A)
Cabo Verde (1)	Cape Verde	Praia	Mindelo	1,824	11	6	1. Jose João Correia Nóbrega Ascenso (A)
Cabo Verde (1)	Cape Verde	Praia	Ilha do Sal	358	11	6	1. Jose João Correia Nóbrega Ascenso (A)
Canadá - Toronto (3)	Canada	Toronto	Toronto	39,079	0	0	1. Laurentino de Sousa Esteves (A); 2. Katia Susana Esteves Caramujo (A); 3. Paulo António da Silva Pereira (A)
Canadá - Toronto (3)	Canada	Toronto	Winnipeg	1,570	0	0	1. Laurentino de Sousa Esteves (A); 2. Katia Susana Esteves Caramujo (A); 3. Paulo António da Silva Pereira (A)
Canadá - Toronto (3)	Canada	Toronto	Chatham-Kent	86	0	0	1. Laurentino de Sousa Esteves (A); 2. Katia Susana Esteves Caramujo (A); 3. Paulo António da Silva Pereira (A)
Canadá - Montreal e Otava (1)	Canada	Montreal		7,355	34	0	1. Daniel Ferreira Loureiro (A)
Canadá - Montreal e Otava (1)	Canada	Ottawa		1,271	34	0	1. Daniel Ferreira Loureiro (A)
Canadá - Vancouver (1)	Canada	Vancouver	Vancouver	4,395	No candidate stood for election		
Canadá - Vancouver (1)	Canada	Vancouver	Edmonton	1,161	No candidate stood for election		
China (Tóquio, Seul, Banguecoque, Singapura) (3)	China	Beijing	Beijing	152	1,972	70	1. Rita Botelho dos Santos (A); 2. Carlos Rui Pires Marcelo (A); 3. Marília Gomes Coelho Coutinho (A)
China (Tóquio, Seul, Banguecoque, Singapura) (3)	Taiwan	Beijing	Taipei	0	1,972	70	1. Rita Botelho dos Santos (A); 2. Carlos Rui Pires Marcelo (A); 3. Marília Gomes Coelho Coutinho (A)
China (Tóquio, Seul, Banguecoque, Singapura) (3)	Mongolia	Beijing	Ulaanbaatar	0	1,972	70	1. Rita Botelho dos Santos (A); 2. Carlos Rui Pires Marcelo (A); 3. Marília Gomes Coelho Coutinho (A)
China (Tóquio, Seul, Banguecoque, Singapura) (3)	China	Macau		54,007	1,972	70	1. Rita Botelho dos Santos (A); 2. Carlos Rui Pires Marcelo (A); 3. Marília Gomes Coelho Coutinho (A)
China (Tóquio, Seul, Banguecoque, Singapura) (3)	China	Shanghai		127	1,972	70	1. Rita Botelho dos Santos (A); 2. Carlos Rui Pires Marcelo (A); 3. Marília Gomes Coelho Coutinho (A)
China (Tóquio, Seul, Banguecoque, Singapura) (3)	China	Canton		73	1,972	70	1. Rita Botelho dos Santos (A); 2. Carlos Rui Pires Marcelo (A); 3. Marília Gomes Coelho Coutinho (A)
China (Tóquio, Seul, Banguecoque, Singapura) (3)	Japan	Tokyo		292	1,972	70	1. Rita Botelho dos Santos (A); 2. Carlos Rui Pires Marcelo (A); 3. Marília Gomes Coelho Coutinho (A)
China (Tóquio, Seul, Banguecoque, Singapura) (3)	Thailand	Bangkok	Bangkok	144	1,972	70	1. Rita Botelho dos Santos (A); 2. Carlos Rui Pires Marcelo (A); 3. Marília Gomes Coelho Coutinho (A)
China (Tóquio, Seul, Banguecoque, Singapura) (3)	Vietnam	Bangkok	Hanoi	30	1,972	70	1. Rita Botelho dos Santos (A); 2. Carlos Rui Pires Marcelo (A); 3. Marília Gomes Coelho Coutinho (A)
China (Tóquio, Seul, Banguecoque, Singapura) (3)	Malaysia	Bangkok	Kuala Lumpur	56	1,972	70	1. Rita Botelho dos Santos (A); 2. Carlos Rui Pires Marcelo (A); 3. Marília Gomes Coelho Coutinho (A)
China (Tóquio, Seul, Banguecoque, Singapura) (3)	Laos	Bangkok	Vientiane	2	1,972	70	1. Rita Botelho dos Santos (A); 2. Carlos Rui Pires Marcelo (A); 3. Marília Gomes Coelho Coutinho (A)
China (Tóquio, Seul, Banguecoque, Singapura) (3)	Cambodia	Bangkok	Pnom Pen	2	1,972	70	1. Rita Botelho dos Santos (A); 2. Carlos Rui Pires Marcelo (A); 3. Marília Gomes Coelho Coutinho (A)
China (Tóquio, Seul, Banguecoque, Singapura) (3)	Myanmar	Bangkok	Yangon	2	1,972	70	1. Rita Botelho dos Santos (A); 2. Carlos Rui Pires Marcelo (A); 3. Marília Gomes Coelho Coutinho (A)
China (Tóquio, Seul, Banguecoque, Singapura) (3)	Singapore			491	1,972	70	1. Rita Botelho dos Santos (A); 2. Carlos Rui Pires Marcelo (A); 3. Marília Gomes Coelho Coutinho (A)
China (Tóquio, Seul, Banguecoque, Singapura) (3)	South Korea	Seoul	Seoul	67	1,972	70	1. Rita Botelho dos Santos (A); 2. Carlos Rui Pires Marcelo (A); 3. Marília Gomes Coelho Coutinho (A)
China (Tóquio, Seul, Banguecoque, Singapura) (3)	North Korea	Seoul	Pyongyang	0	1,972	70	1. Rita Botelho dos Santos (A); 2. Carlos Rui Pires Marcelo (A); 3. Marília Gomes Coelho Coutinho (A)
Espanha (1)	Spain	Barcelona		46,561	38	1	1. Hilário Caixeiro da Cunha (A)
Espanha (1)	Spain	Madrid	Madrid	14,221	38	1	1. Hilário Caixeiro da Cunha (A)
Espanha (1)	Spain	Madrid	Salamanca	16	38	1	1. Hilário Caixeiro da Cunha (A)
Espanha (1)	Spain	Madrid	León	2,007	38	1	1. Hilário Caixeiro da Cunha (A)
Espanha (1)	Spain	Madrid	Bilbao	3,339	38	1	1. Hilário Caixeiro da Cunha (A)
Espanha (1)	Spain	Madrid	San Sebastián	45	38	1	1. Hilário Caixeiro da Cunha (A)
Espanha (1)	Spain	Vigo	Vigo	7,290	38	1	1. Hilário Caixeiro da Cunha (A)
Espanha (1)	Spain	Vigo	Ourense	137	38	1	1. Hilário Caixeiro da Cunha (A)
Espanha (1)	Spain	Seville	Seville	5,126	38	1	1. Hilário Caixeiro da Cunha (A)
Espanha (1)	Spain	Seville	Badajoz	11	38	1	1. Hilário Caixeiro da Cunha (A)
Estados Unidos - Washington (1)	United States	Washington	Washington	6,453	5	5	1. Mário Francisco da Costa Ferreira (A)
Estados Unidos - Washington (1)	United States	Washington	Chicago	0	5	5	1. Mário Francisco da Costa Ferreira (A)
Estados Unidos - Washington (1)	United States	Washington	Houston	0	5	5	1. Mário Francisco da Costa Ferreira (A)
Estados Unidos - Miami e Orlando (Palm Coast) (1)	United States	Washington	Orlando	0	31	0	1. Manuel Pinto Pereira Viegas (A)
Estados Unidos - Miami e Orlando (Palm Coast) (1)	United States	Washington	Palm Coast	8,258	31	0	1. Manuel Pinto Pereira Viegas (A)
Estados Unidos - Miami e Orlando (Palm Coast) (1)	United States	Washington	Miami	0	31	0	1. Manuel Pinto Pereira Viegas (A)
Estados Unidos - Miami e Orlando (Palm Coast) (1)	Bahamas	Washington	Nassau	0	31	0	1. Manuel Pinto Pereira Viegas (A)
Estados Unidos - New Bedford, Boston e Providence (2)	United States	Boston		6,155	202	8	1. Márcia Vitória Furtado Sousa (B); 2. João Jacinto Faria Correa (B)
Estados Unidos - New Bedford, Boston e Providence (2)	United States	New Bedford		7,403	202	8	1. Márcia Vitória Furtado Sousa (B); 2. João Jacinto Faria Correa (B)
Estados Unidos - New Bedford, Boston e Providence (2)	United States	Providence		4,920	202	8	1. Márcia Vitória Furtado Sousa (B); 2. João Jacinto Faria Correa (B)
Estados Unidos - Newark e Nova Iorque (2)	United States	Newark	Newark	15,219	108	1	1. Paulo Alexandre de Almeida Pereira (B); 2. Carla Sofia Cabral Rodrigues da Silva (B)
Estados Unidos - Newark e Nova Iorque (2)	United States	Newark	Philadelphia	56	108	1	1. Paulo Alexandre de Almeida Pereira (B); 2. Carla Sofia Cabral Rodrigues da Silva (B)
Estados Unidos - Newark e Nova Iorque (2)	United States	New York	New York	7,151	108	1	1. Paulo Alexandre de Almeida Pereira (B); 2. Carla Sofia Cabral Rodrigues da Silva (B)
Estados Unidos - Newark e Nova Iorque (2)	United States	New York	Waterbury	4,169	108	1	1. Paulo Alexandre de Almeida Pereira (B); 2. Carla Sofia Cabral Rodrigues da Silva (B)
Estados Unidos - Newark e Nova Iorque (2)	United States	New York	San Juan, Puerto Rico	49	108	1	1. Paulo Alexandre de Almeida Pereira (B); 2. Carla Sofia Cabral Rodrigues da Silva (B)
Estados Unidos - Newark e Nova Iorque (2)	United States	New York	Charlotte Amalie, Virgin Islands	0	108	1	1. Paulo Alexandre de Almeida Pereira (B); 2. Carla Sofia Cabral Rodrigues da Silva (B)
Estados Unidos - Newark e Nova Iorque (2)	United States	New York	George Town, Cayman Islands	17	108	1	1. Paulo Alexandre de Almeida Pereira (B); 2. Carla Sofia Cabral Rodrigues da Silva (B)
Estados Unidos - São Francisco (Cidade do México) (1)	United States	San Francisco	San Francisco	5,612	6	0	1. Manuel da Silva Bettencourt (A)
Estados Unidos - São Francisco (Cidade do México) (1)	United States	San Francisco	Los Angeles	7	6	0	1. Manuel da Silva Bettencourt (A)
Estados Unidos - São Francisco (Cidade do México) (1)	United States	San Francisco	Honolulu	0	6	0	1. Manuel da Silva Bettencourt (A)
Estados Unidos - São Francisco (Cidade do México) (1)	United States	San Francisco	Pago Pago, American Samoa	0	6	0	1. Manuel da Silva Bettencourt (A)
Estados Unidos - São Francisco (Cidade do México) (1)	United States	San Francisco	Saipan, Northern Mariana Islands	0	6	0	1. Manuel da Silva Bettencourt (A)
Estados Unidos - São Francisco (Cidade do México) (1)	Mexico	Mexico	Mexico City	1,342	6	0	1. Manuel da Silva Bettencourt (A)
Estados Unidos - São Francisco (Cidade do México) (1)	El Salvador	Mexico	San Salvador	10	6	0	1. Manuel da Silva Bettencourt (A)
Estados Unidos - São Francisco (Cidade do México) (1)	Guatemala	Mexico	Guatemala City	25	6	0	1. Manuel da Silva Bettencourt (A)
Estados Unidos - São Francisco (Cidade do México) (1)	Honduras	Mexico	Tegucicalpa	4	6	0	1. Manuel da Silva Bettencourt (A)
Estados Unidos - São Francisco (Cidade do México) (1)	Dominican Republic	Mexico	Santo Domingo	81	6	0	1. Manuel da Silva Bettencourt (A)
Estados Unidos - São Francisco (Cidade do México) (1)	Turks and Caicos Islands	Mexico	Cockburn Town	0	6	0	1. Manuel da Silva Bettencourt (A)
Estados Unidos - São Francisco (Cidade do México) (1)	Belize	Mexico	Belmopan	1	6	0	1. Manuel da Silva Bettencourt (A)
França - Paris (7)	France	Paris	Paris	190,105	253	6	1. Antonio Paulo Neves Marques (A); 2. Odete da Silva Fernandes (A); 3. Fernando Julião Rodrigues (A); 4. Cristina de Sá do Vale Alves (A); 5. João do Nascimento Martins Pereira (B); 6. Maria Emília de Almeida Ribeiro (B); 7. Antonio Manuel Pinho dos Santos Oliveira (B)
França - Paris (7)	France	Paris	Rouen	4,190	253	6	1. Antonio Paulo Neves Marques (A); 2. Odete da Silva Fernandes (A); 3. Fernando Julião Rodrigues (A); 4. Cristina de Sá do Vale Alves (A); 5. João do Nascimento Martins Pereira (B); 6. Maria Emília de Almeida Ribeiro (B); 7. Antonio Manuel Pinho dos Santos Oliveira (B)
França - Paris (7)	France	Paris	Le Havre	38	253	6	1. Antonio Paulo Neves Marques (A); 2. Odete da Silva Fernandes (A); 3. Fernando Julião Rodrigues (A); 4. Cristina de Sá do Vale Alves (A); 5. João do Nascimento Martins Pereira (B); 6. Maria Emília de Almeida Ribeiro (B); 7. Antonio Manuel Pinho dos Santos Oliveira (B)
França - Paris (7)	France	Paris	Lille	226	253	6	1. Antonio Paulo Neves Marques (A); 2. Odete da Silva Fernandes (A); 3. Fernando Julião Rodrigues (A); 4. Cristina de Sá do Vale Alves (A); 5. João do Nascimento Martins Pereira (B); 6. Maria Emília de Almeida Ribeiro (B); 7. Antonio Manuel Pinho dos Santos Oliveira (B)
França - Paris (7)	France	Paris	Nogent-Sur-Marne	752	253	6	1. Antonio Paulo Neves Marques (A); 2. Odete da Silva Fernandes (A); 3. Fernando Julião Rodrigues (A); 4. Cristina de Sá do Vale Alves (A); 5. João do Nascimento Martins Pereira (B); 6. Maria Emília de Almeida Ribeiro (B); 7. Antonio Manuel Pinho dos Santos Oliveira (B)
França - Paris (7)	France	Paris	Reims	693	253	6	1. Antonio Paulo Neves Marques (A); 2. Odete da Silva Fernandes (A); 3. Fernando Julião Rodrigues (A); 4. Cristina de Sá do Vale Alves (A); 5. João do Nascimento Martins Pereira (B); 6. Maria Emília de Almeida Ribeiro (B); 7. Antonio Manuel Pinho dos Santos Oliveira (B)
França - Paris (7)	France	Paris	Orléans	12,900	253	6	1. Antonio Paulo Neves Marques (A); 2. Odete da Silva Fernandes (A); 3. Fernando Julião Rodrigues (A); 4. Cristina de Sá do Vale Alves (A); 5. João do Nascimento Martins Pereira (B); 6. Maria Emília de Almeida Ribeiro (B); 7. Antonio Manuel Pinho dos Santos Oliveira (B)
França - Paris (7)	France	Paris	Tours	14,216	253	6	1. Antonio Paulo Neves Marques (A); 2. Odete da Silva Fernandes (A); 3. Fernando Julião Rodrigues (A); 4. Cristina de Sá do Vale Alves (A); 5. João do Nascimento Martins Pereira (B); 6. Maria Emília de Almeida Ribeiro (B); 7. Antonio Manuel Pinho dos Santos Oliveira (B)
França - Paris (7)	France	Paris	Versailles	560	253	6	1. Antonio Paulo Neves Marques (A); 2. Odete da Silva Fernandes (A); 3. Fernando Julião Rodrigues (A); 4. Cristina de Sá do Vale Alves (A); 5. João do Nascimento Martins Pereira (B); 6. Maria Emília de Almeida Ribeiro (B); 7. Antonio Manuel Pinho dos Santos Oliveira (B)
França - Paris (7)	France	Paris	Nantes	111	253	6	1. Antonio Paulo Neves Marques (A); 2. Odete da Silva Fernandes (A); 3. Fernando Julião Rodrigues (A); 4. Cristina de Sá do Vale Alves (A); 5. João do Nascimento Martins Pereira (B); 6. Maria Emília de Almeida Ribeiro (B); 7. Antonio Manuel Pinho dos Santos Oliveira (B)
França - Paris (7)	France	Paris	Mata Utu, Wallis and Futuna	0	253	6	1. Antonio Paulo Neves Marques (A); 2. Odete da Silva Fernandes (A); 3. Fernando Julião Rodrigues (A); 4. Cristina de Sá do Vale Alves (A); 5. João do Nascimento Martins Pereira (B); 6. Maria Emília de Almeida Ribeiro (B); 7. Antonio Manuel Pinho dos Santos Oliveira (B)
França - Paris (7)	France	Paris	Saint-Pierre, Saint Pierre and Miquelon	0	253	6	1. Antonio Paulo Neves Marques (A); 2. Odete da Silva Fernandes (A); 3. Fernando Julião Rodrigues (A); 4. Cristina de Sá do Vale Alves (A); 5. João do Nascimento Martins Pereira (B); 6. Maria Emília de Almeida Ribeiro (B); 7. Antonio Manuel Pinho dos Santos Oliveira (B)
França - Paris (7)	France	Paris	Marigot, Saint Martin	1	253	6	1. Antonio Paulo Neves Marques (A); 2. Odete da Silva Fernandes (A); 3. Fernando Julião Rodrigues (A); 4. Cristina de Sá do Vale Alves (A); 5. João do Nascimento Martins Pereira (B); 6. Maria Emília de Almeida Ribeiro (B); 7. Antonio Manuel Pinho dos Santos Oliveira (B)
França - Paris (7)	France	Paris	Gustavia, Saint Barthélemy	6	253	6	1. Antonio Paulo Neves Marques (A); 2. Odete da Silva Fernandes (A); 3. Fernando Julião Rodrigues (A); 4. Cristina de Sá do Vale Alves (A); 5. João do Nascimento Martins Pereira (B); 6. Maria Emília de Almeida Ribeiro (B); 7. Antonio Manuel Pinho dos Santos Oliveira (B)
França - Paris (7)	France	Paris	Saint-Denis, Réunion	20	253	6	1. Antonio Paulo Neves Marques (A); 2. Odete da Silva Fernandes (A); 3. Fernando Julião Rodrigues (A); 4. Cristina de Sá do Vale Alves (A); 5. João do Nascimento Martins Pereira (B); 6. Maria Emília de Almeida Ribeiro (B); 7. Antonio Manuel Pinho dos Santos Oliveira (B)
França - Paris (7)	France	Paris	Papeete, French Polynesia	1	253	6	1. Antonio Paulo Neves Marques (A); 2. Odete da Silva Fernandes (A); 3. Fernando Julião Rodrigues (A); 4. Cristina de Sá do Vale Alves (A); 5. João do Nascimento Martins Pereira (B); 6. Maria Emília de Almeida Ribeiro (B); 7. Antonio Manuel Pinho dos Santos Oliveira (B)
França - Paris (7)	France	Paris	Nouméa, New Caledonia	0	253	6	1. Antonio Paulo Neves Marques (A); 2. Odete da Silva Fernandes (A); 3. Fernando Julião Rodrigues (A); 4. Cristina de Sá do Vale Alves (A); 5. João do Nascimento Martins Pereira (B); 6. Maria Emília de Almeida Ribeiro (B); 7. Antonio Manuel Pinho dos Santos Oliveira (B)
França - Paris (7)	France	Paris	Fort-de-France, Martinique	3	253	6	1. Antonio Paulo Neves Marques (A); 2. Odete da Silva Fernandes (A); 3. Fernando Julião Rodrigues (A); 4. Cristina de Sá do Vale Alves (A); 5. João do Nascimento Martins Pereira (B); 6. Maria Emília de Almeida Ribeiro (B); 7. Antonio Manuel Pinho dos Santos Oliveira (B)
França - Paris (7)	France	Paris	Mamoudzou, Mayotte	0	253	6	1. Antonio Paulo Neves Marques (A); 2. Odete da Silva Fernandes (A); 3. Fernando Julião Rodrigues (A); 4. Cristina de Sá do Vale Alves (A); 5. João do Nascimento Martins Pereira (B); 6. Maria Emília de Almeida Ribeiro (B); 7. Antonio Manuel Pinho dos Santos Oliveira (B)
França - Paris (7)	France	Paris	Cayenne, French Guiana	0	253	6	1. Antonio Paulo Neves Marques (A); 2. Odete da Silva Fernandes (A); 3. Fernando Julião Rodrigues (A); 4. Cristina de Sá do Vale Alves (A); 5. João do Nascimento Martins Pereira (B); 6. Maria Emília de Almeida Ribeiro (B); 7. Antonio Manuel Pinho dos Santos Oliveira (B)
França - Paris (7)	France	Paris	Basse-Terre, Guadeloupe	5	253	6	1. Antonio Paulo Neves Marques (A); 2. Odete da Silva Fernandes (A); 3. Fernando Julião Rodrigues (A); 4. Cristina de Sá do Vale Alves (A); 5. João do Nascimento Martins Pereira (B); 6. Maria Emília de Almeida Ribeiro (B); 7. Antonio Manuel Pinho dos Santos Oliveira (B)
França - Bordéus e Toulouse (2)	France	Bordeaux	Bordeaux	54,224	288	6	1. Vitor Gabriel Rodrigues Gomes de Oliveira (A); 2. Maria Teresa Gonçalves Fontão (A)
França - Bordéus e Toulouse (2)	France	Bordeaux	Bayonne	244	288	6	1. Vitor Gabriel Rodrigues Gomes de Oliveira (A); 2. Maria Teresa Gonçalves Fontão (A)
França - Bordéus e Toulouse (2)	France	Toulouse		21,408	288	6	1. Vitor Gabriel Rodrigues Gomes de Oliveira (A); 2. Maria Teresa Gonçalves Fontão (A)
França - Lyon e Marselha (3)	France	Lyon	Lyon	95,004	306	9	1. Jorge Manuel Ascensão de Campos (A); 2. Emília Fernanda de Campos Rolo Macedo (A); 3. Manuel Moreira Cardia Lima (B)
França - Lyon e Marselha (3)	France	Lyon	Clermont-Ferrand	10,718	306	9	1. Jorge Manuel Ascensão de Campos (A); 2. Emília Fernanda de Campos Rolo Macedo (A); 3. Manuel Moreira Cardia Lima (B)
França - Lyon e Marselha (3)	France	Marseille	Marseille	11,747	306	9	1. Jorge Manuel Ascensão de Campos (A); 2. Emília Fernanda de Campos Rolo Macedo (A); 3. Manuel Moreira Cardia Lima (B)
França - Lyon e Marselha (3)	France	Marseille	Ajaccio	6,428	306	9	1. Jorge Manuel Ascensão de Campos (A); 2. Emília Fernanda de Campos Rolo Macedo (A); 3. Manuel Moreira Cardia Lima (B)
França - Lyon e Marselha (3)	France	Marseille	Nice	11,890	306	9	1. Jorge Manuel Ascensão de Campos (A); 2. Emília Fernanda de Campos Rolo Macedo (A); 3. Manuel Moreira Cardia Lima (B)
França - Lyon e Marselha (3)	France	Marseille	Montpellier	5,072	306	9	1. Jorge Manuel Ascensão de Campos (A); 2. Emília Fernanda de Campos Rolo Macedo (A); 3. Manuel Moreira Cardia Lima (B)
França - Lyon e Marselha (3)	Monaco	Marseille	Monaco City	206	306	9	1. Jorge Manuel Ascensão de Campos (A); 2. Emília Fernanda de Campos Rolo Macedo (A); 3. Manuel Moreira Cardia Lima (B)
França - Estrasburgo (1)	France	Strasbourg	Strasbourg	19,590	62	6	1. Rui Manuel Ribeiro Barata (A)
França - Estrasburgo (1)	France	Strasbourg	Nancy	135	62	6	1. Rui Manuel Ribeiro Barata (A)
Grã-Bretanha - Londres e Manchester (Dublin) (6)	Ireland	Dublin		6,275	577	3	1. António Manuel Mota da Cunha (B); 2. Sandra Conceição Ferreira (B); 3. João Pedro dos Santos Alves da Cruz (B); 4. Ciana d’Costa (B); 5. Duarte Manuel Sousa Fernandes (B); 6. Pedro Filipe Anes Xavier (C)
Grã-Bretanha - Londres e Manchester (Dublin) (6)	United Kingdom	London	London	125,008	577	3	1. António Manuel Mota da Cunha (B); 2. Sandra Conceição Ferreira (B); 3. João Pedro dos Santos Alves da Cruz (B); 4. Ciana d’Costa (B); 5. Duarte Manuel Sousa Fernandes (B); 6. Pedro Filipe Anes Xavier (C)
Grã-Bretanha - Londres e Manchester (Dublin) (6)	United Kingdom	London	Gibraltar	117	577	3	1. António Manuel Mota da Cunha (B); 2. Sandra Conceição Ferreira (B); 3. João Pedro dos Santos Alves da Cruz (B); 4. Ciana d’Costa (B); 5. Duarte Manuel Sousa Fernandes (B); 6. Pedro Filipe Anes Xavier (C)
Grã-Bretanha - Londres e Manchester (Dublin) (6)	United Kingdom	London	Saint Helier, Jersey	4,173	577	3	1. António Manuel Mota da Cunha (B); 2. Sandra Conceição Ferreira (B); 3. João Pedro dos Santos Alves da Cruz (B); 4. Ciana d’Costa (B); 5. Duarte Manuel Sousa Fernandes (B); 6. Pedro Filipe Anes Xavier (C)
Grã-Bretanha - Londres e Manchester (Dublin) (6)	United Kingdom	London	Saint Peter Port, Guernsey	248	577	3	1. António Manuel Mota da Cunha (B); 2. Sandra Conceição Ferreira (B); 3. João Pedro dos Santos Alves da Cruz (B); 4. Ciana d’Costa (B); 5. Duarte Manuel Sousa Fernandes (B); 6. Pedro Filipe Anes Xavier (C)
Grã-Bretanha - Bermuda (1)	United Kingdom	London	Hamilton, Bermuda	1,070	No candidate stood for election		
Guiné-Bissau (Abidjan, Argel, Cairo, Rabat, Abuja, Dakar, Túnis, Adis Abeba) (1)	Algeria	Algiers	Algiers	12	No candidate stood for election		
Guiné-Bissau (Abidjan, Argel, Cairo, Rabat, Abuja, Dakar, Túnis, Adis Abeba) (1)	Egypt	Cairo	Cairo	37	No candidate stood for election		
Guiné-Bissau (Abidjan, Argel, Cairo, Rabat, Abuja, Dakar, Túnis, Adis Abeba) (1)	Jordan	Cairo	Amman	12	No candidate stood for election		
Guiné-Bissau (Abidjan, Argel, Cairo, Rabat, Abuja, Dakar, Túnis, Adis Abeba) (1)	Sudan	Cairo	Khartoum	3	No candidate stood for election		
Guiné-Bissau (Abidjan, Argel, Cairo, Rabat, Abuja, Dakar, Túnis, Adis Abeba) (1)	Eritrea	Cairo	Asmara	0	No candidate stood for election		
Guiné-Bissau (Abidjan, Argel, Cairo, Rabat, Abuja, Dakar, Túnis, Adis Abeba) (1)	Morocco	Rabat		416	No candidate stood for election		
Guiné-Bissau (Abidjan, Argel, Cairo, Rabat, Abuja, Dakar, Túnis, Adis Abeba) (1)	Nigeria	Abuja	Abuja	22	No candidate stood for election		
Guiné-Bissau (Abidjan, Argel, Cairo, Rabat, Abuja, Dakar, Túnis, Adis Abeba) (1)	Ghana	Abuja	Accra	54	No candidate stood for election		
Guiné-Bissau (Abidjan, Argel, Cairo, Rabat, Abuja, Dakar, Túnis, Adis Abeba) (1)	Togo	Abuja	Lomé	4	No candidate stood for election		
Guiné-Bissau (Abidjan, Argel, Cairo, Rabat, Abuja, Dakar, Túnis, Adis Abeba) (1)	Niger	Abuja	Niamey	2	No candidate stood for election		
Guiné-Bissau (Abidjan, Argel, Cairo, Rabat, Abuja, Dakar, Túnis, Adis Abeba) (1)	Chad	Abuja	N'Djamena	3	No candidate stood for election		
Guiné-Bissau (Abidjan, Argel, Cairo, Rabat, Abuja, Dakar, Túnis, Adis Abeba) (1)	Cameroon	Abuja	Yaoundé	7	No candidate stood for election		
Guiné-Bissau (Abidjan, Argel, Cairo, Rabat, Abuja, Dakar, Túnis, Adis Abeba) (1)	Benin	Abuja	Porto-Novo	4	No candidate stood for election		
Guiné-Bissau (Abidjan, Argel, Cairo, Rabat, Abuja, Dakar, Túnis, Adis Abeba) (1)	Senegal	Dakar	Dakar	242	No candidate stood for election		
Guiné-Bissau (Abidjan, Argel, Cairo, Rabat, Abuja, Dakar, Túnis, Adis Abeba) (1)	Sierra Leone	Dakar	Freetown	3	No candidate stood for election		
Guiné-Bissau (Abidjan, Argel, Cairo, Rabat, Abuja, Dakar, Túnis, Adis Abeba) (1)	Mauritania	Dakar	Nouakchott	4	No candidate stood for election		
Guiné-Bissau (Abidjan, Argel, Cairo, Rabat, Abuja, Dakar, Túnis, Adis Abeba) (1)	Mali	Dakar	Bamako	7	No candidate stood for election		
Guiné-Bissau (Abidjan, Argel, Cairo, Rabat, Abuja, Dakar, Túnis, Adis Abeba) (1)	Liberia	Dakar	Monrovia	2	No candidate stood for election		
Guiné-Bissau (Abidjan, Argel, Cairo, Rabat, Abuja, Dakar, Túnis, Adis Abeba) (1)	Guinea	Dakar	Conakry	39	No candidate stood for election		
Guiné-Bissau (Abidjan, Argel, Cairo, Rabat, Abuja, Dakar, Túnis, Adis Abeba) (1)	Gambia	Dakar	Banjul	5	No candidate stood for election		
Guiné-Bissau (Abidjan, Argel, Cairo, Rabat, Abuja, Dakar, Túnis, Adis Abeba) (1)	Burkina Faso	Dakar	Ouagadougou	2	No candidate stood for election		
Guiné-Bissau (Abidjan, Argel, Cairo, Rabat, Abuja, Dakar, Túnis, Adis Abeba) (1)	Tunisia	Tunis	Tunis	179	No candidate stood for election		
Guiné-Bissau (Abidjan, Argel, Cairo, Rabat, Abuja, Dakar, Túnis, Adis Abeba) (1)	Libya	Tunis	Tripoli	3	No candidate stood for election		
Guiné-Bissau (Abidjan, Argel, Cairo, Rabat, Abuja, Dakar, Túnis, Adis Abeba) (1)	Guinea-Bissau	Bissau		210	No candidate stood for election		
Guiné-Bissau (Abidjan, Argel, Cairo, Rabat, Abuja, Dakar, Túnis, Adis Abeba) (1)	Ivory Coast	Abidjan		97	No candidate stood for election		
Guiné-Bissau (Abidjan, Argel, Cairo, Rabat, Abuja, Dakar, Túnis, Adis Abeba) (1)	Ethiopia	Addis Ababa	Addis Ababa	10	No candidate stood for election		
Guiné-Bissau (Abidjan, Argel, Cairo, Rabat, Abuja, Dakar, Túnis, Adis Abeba) (1)	South Sudan	Addis Ababa	Juba	0	No candidate stood for election		
Guiné-Bissau (Abidjan, Argel, Cairo, Rabat, Abuja, Dakar, Túnis, Adis Abeba) (1)	Somalia	Addis Ababa	Mogadishu	1	No candidate stood for election		
Guiné-Bissau (Abidjan, Argel, Cairo, Rabat, Abuja, Dakar, Túnis, Adis Abeba) (1)	Rwanda	Addis Ababa	Kigali	76	No candidate stood for election		
Guiné-Bissau (Abidjan, Argel, Cairo, Rabat, Abuja, Dakar, Túnis, Adis Abeba) (1)	Djibouti	Addis Ababa	Djibouti City	1	No candidate stood for election		
Índia (Islamabad, Astana, Teerão) (1)	India	New Delhi	New Delhi	326	No candidate stood for election		
Índia (Islamabad, Astana, Teerão) (1)	Sri Lanka	New Delhi	Kotte	4	No candidate stood for election		
Índia (Islamabad, Astana, Teerão) (1)	Nepal	New Delhi	Kathmandu	7	No candidate stood for election		
Índia (Islamabad, Astana, Teerão) (1)	Maldives	New Delhi	Malé	3	No candidate stood for election		
Índia (Islamabad, Astana, Teerão) (1)	Bhutan	New Delhi	Thimphu	0	No candidate stood for election		
Índia (Islamabad, Astana, Teerão) (1)	Bangladesh	New Delhi	Dhaka	2	No candidate stood for election		
Índia (Islamabad, Astana, Teerão) (1)	India	Goa		13,794	No candidate stood for election		
Índia (Islamabad, Astana, Teerão) (1)	Iran	Tehran		16	No candidate stood for election		
Índia (Islamabad, Astana, Teerão) (1)	Pakistan	Islamabad	Islamabad	21	No candidate stood for election		
Índia (Islamabad, Astana, Teerão) (1)	Pakistan	Islamabad	Karachi	4	No candidate stood for election		
Índia (Islamabad, Astana, Teerão) (1)	Kazakhstan	Astana	Astana	8	No candidate stood for election		
Índia (Islamabad, Astana, Teerão) (1)	Kyrgyzstan	Astana	Bishkek	1	No candidate stood for election		
Israel (Riyadh, Abu Dhabi, Doha) (1)	Saudi Arabia	Riyadh	Riyadh	350	No candidate stood for election		
Israel (Riyadh, Abu Dhabi, Doha) (1)	Bahrain	Riyadh	Manama	50	No candidate stood for election		
Israel (Riyadh, Abu Dhabi, Doha) (1)	Oman	Riyadh	Muscat	49	No candidate stood for election		
Israel (Riyadh, Abu Dhabi, Doha) (1)	Yemen	Riyadh	Sanaa	1	No candidate stood for election		
Israel (Riyadh, Abu Dhabi, Doha) (1)	Israel	Tel Aviv		29,854	No candidate stood for election		
Israel (Riyadh, Abu Dhabi, Doha) (1)	United Arab Emirates	Abu Dhabi	Abu Dhabi	2,844	No candidate stood for election		
Israel (Riyadh, Abu Dhabi, Doha) (1)	Kuwait	Abu Dhabi	Kuwait City	141	No candidate stood for election		
Israel (Riyadh, Abu Dhabi, Doha) (1)	Iraq	Abu Dhabi	Baghdad	6	No candidate stood for election		
Israel (Riyadh, Abu Dhabi, Doha) (1)	Qatar	Doha		579	No candidate stood for election		
Luxemburgo (2)	Luxembourg			37,617	164	9	1. Ines Rodrigues Peixoto (B); 2. Custódio Manuel Caseiro Portásio (A)
Moçambique (Nairóbi, Harare) (1)	Mozambique	Maputo	Maputo	7,869	No candidate stood for election		
Moçambique (Nairóbi, Harare) (1)	Eswatini	Maputo	Mbabane	249	No candidate stood for election		
Moçambique (Nairóbi, Harare) (1)	Mauritius	Maputo	Port Louis	6	No candidate stood for election		
Moçambique (Nairóbi, Harare) (1)	Uganda	Maputo	Kampala	0	No candidate stood for election		
Moçambique (Nairóbi, Harare) (1)	Tanzania	Maputo	Dar es Salaam	29	No candidate stood for election		
Moçambique (Nairóbi, Harare) (1)	Seychelles	Maputo	Victoria	3	No candidate stood for election		
Moçambique (Nairóbi, Harare) (1)	Mozambique	Beira	Beira	1,006	No candidate stood for election		
Moçambique (Nairóbi, Harare) (1)	Mozambique	Beira	Quelimane	0	No candidate stood for election		
Moçambique (Nairóbi, Harare) (1)	Mozambique	Beira	Nampula	198	No candidate stood for election		
Moçambique (Nairóbi, Harare) (1)	Zimbabwe	Harare	Harare	361	No candidate stood for election		
Moçambique (Nairóbi, Harare) (1)	Zambia	Harare	Lusaka	12	No candidate stood for election		
Moçambique (Nairóbi, Harare) (1)	Malawi	Harare	Lilongwe	78	No candidate stood for election		
Moçambique (Nairóbi, Harare) (1)	Kenya	Nairobi		184	No candidate stood for election		
Namíbia (1)	Namibia	Windhoek		566	31	1	1. Manuel Cândido de Oliveira Coelho (A)
Países Baixos (1)	Netherlands	The Hague	The Hague	17,247	18	1	1. Tiago Rodrigues Soares (A)
Países Baixos (1)	Netherlands	The Hague	Rotterdam	82	18	1	1. Tiago Rodrigues Soares (A)
Curaçau (1)	Curaçao	The Hague	Curaçao	370	No candidate stood for election		
Curaçau (1)	Aruba	The Hague	Aruba	70	No candidate stood for election		
Curaçau (1)	Netherlands	The Hague	Philipsburg	1	No candidate stood for election		
Curaçau (1)	Netherlands	The Hague	Caribbean Netherlands	3	No candidate stood for election		
São Tomé e Príncipe (1)	São Tomé and Príncipe	São Tomé	São Tomé	640	No candidate stood for election		
São Tomé e Príncipe (1)	Gabon	São Tomé	Libreville	13	No candidate stood for election		
Suécia (Oslo, Copenhaga, Helsínquia) (1)	Denmark	Copenhagen	Copenhagen	2,640	No candidate stood for election		
Suécia (Oslo, Copenhaga, Helsínquia) (1)	Lithuania	Copenhagen	Vilnius	56	No candidate stood for election		
Suécia (Oslo, Copenhaga, Helsínquia) (1)	Faroe Islands	Copenhagen	Tórshavn	0	No candidate stood for election		
Suécia (Oslo, Copenhaga, Helsínquia) (1)	Greenland	Copenhagen	Nuuk	0	No candidate stood for election		
Suécia (Oslo, Copenhaga, Helsínquia) (1)	Finland	Helsinki	Helsinki	710	No candidate stood for election		
Suécia (Oslo, Copenhaga, Helsínquia) (1)	Finland	Helsinki	Mariehamn	0	No candidate stood for election		
Suécia (Oslo, Copenhaga, Helsínquia) (1)	Estonia	Helsinki	Tallinn	92	No candidate stood for election		
Suécia (Oslo, Copenhaga, Helsínquia) (1)	Norway	Oslo	Oslo	3,540	No candidate stood for election		
Suécia (Oslo, Copenhaga, Helsínquia) (1)	Iceland	Oslo	Reykjavik	459	No candidate stood for election		
Suécia (Oslo, Copenhaga, Helsínquia) (1)	Norway	Oslo	Olonkinbyen	0	No candidate stood for election		
Suécia (Oslo, Copenhaga, Helsínquia) (1)	Norway	Oslo	Bouvet Island	0	No candidate stood for election		
Suécia (Oslo, Copenhaga, Helsínquia) (1)	Sweden	Stockholm	Stockholm	1,700	No candidate stood for election		
Suécia (Oslo, Copenhaga, Helsínquia) (1)	Sweden	Stockholm	Gothenburg	881	No candidate stood for election		
Suécia (Oslo, Copenhaga, Helsínquia) (1)	Latvia	Stockholm	Riga	23	No candidate stood for election		
Suíça (Roma, Viena) (5)	Austria	Vienna	Vienna	1,949	305	7	1. António Guerra Iria (B); 2. Ângela Guilhermina Tavares Barbosa dos Reis (B); 3. José Pio Bemposta (B); 4. Helena Veríssimo de Freitas (B); 5. Domingos Augusto Ramalho Pereira (A)
Suíça (Roma, Viena) (5)	Slovenia	Vienna	Ljubljana	51	305	7	1. António Guerra Iria (B); 2. Ângela Guilhermina Tavares Barbosa dos Reis (B); 3. José Pio Bemposta (B); 4. Helena Veríssimo de Freitas (B); 5. Domingos Augusto Ramalho Pereira (A)
Suíça (Roma, Viena) (5)	Italy	Rome	Rome	3,706	305	7	1. António Guerra Iria (B); 2. Ângela Guilhermina Tavares Barbosa dos Reis (B); 3. José Pio Bemposta (B); 4. Helena Veríssimo de Freitas (B); 5. Domingos Augusto Ramalho Pereira (A)
Suíça (Roma, Viena) (5)	Italy	Rome	Milan	44	305	7	1. António Guerra Iria (B); 2. Ângela Guilhermina Tavares Barbosa dos Reis (B); 3. José Pio Bemposta (B); 4. Helena Veríssimo de Freitas (B); 5. Domingos Augusto Ramalho Pereira (A)
Suíça (Roma, Viena) (5)	Malta	Rome	Valletta	279	305	7	1. António Guerra Iria (B); 2. Ângela Guilhermina Tavares Barbosa dos Reis (B); 3. José Pio Bemposta (B); 4. Helena Veríssimo de Freitas (B); 5. Domingos Augusto Ramalho Pereira (A)
Suíça (Roma, Viena) (5)	Holy See	Rome	Vatican City	2	305	7	1. António Guerra Iria (B); 2. Ângela Guilhermina Tavares Barbosa dos Reis (B); 3. José Pio Bemposta (B); 4. Helena Veríssimo de Freitas (B); 5. Domingos Augusto Ramalho Pereira (A)
Suíça (Roma, Viena) (5)	San Marino	Rome	City of San Marino	5	305	7	1. António Guerra Iria (B); 2. Ângela Guilhermina Tavares Barbosa dos Reis (B); 3. José Pio Bemposta (B); 4. Helena Veríssimo de Freitas (B); 5. Domingos Augusto Ramalho Pereira (A)
Suíça (Roma, Viena) (5)	Albania	Rome	Tirana	7	305	7	1. António Guerra Iria (B); 2. Ângela Guilhermina Tavares Barbosa dos Reis (B); 3. José Pio Bemposta (B); 4. Helena Veríssimo de Freitas (B); 5. Domingos Augusto Ramalho Pereira (A)
Suíça (Roma, Viena) (5)	Switzerland	Bern		24,522	305	7	1. António Guerra Iria (B); 2. Ângela Guilhermina Tavares Barbosa dos Reis (B); 3. José Pio Bemposta (B); 4. Helena Veríssimo de Freitas (B); 5. Domingos Augusto Ramalho Pereira (A)
Suíça (Roma, Viena) (5)	Switzerland	Geneva	Geneva	60,278	305	7	1. António Guerra Iria (B); 2. Ângela Guilhermina Tavares Barbosa dos Reis (B); 3. José Pio Bemposta (B); 4. Helena Veríssimo de Freitas (B); 5. Domingos Augusto Ramalho Pereira (A)
Suíça (Roma, Viena) (5)	Switzerland	Geneva	Sion	16,714	305	7	1. António Guerra Iria (B); 2. Ângela Guilhermina Tavares Barbosa dos Reis (B); 3. José Pio Bemposta (B); 4. Helena Veríssimo de Freitas (B); 5. Domingos Augusto Ramalho Pereira (A)
Suíça (Roma, Viena) (5)	Switzerland	Zurich	Zurich	43,035	305	7	1. António Guerra Iria (B); 2. Ângela Guilhermina Tavares Barbosa dos Reis (B); 3. José Pio Bemposta (B); 4. Helena Veríssimo de Freitas (B); 5. Domingos Augusto Ramalho Pereira (A)
Suíça (Roma, Viena) (5)	Switzerland	Zurich	Lugano	5,345	305	7	1. António Guerra Iria (B); 2. Ângela Guilhermina Tavares Barbosa dos Reis (B); 3. José Pio Bemposta (B); 4. Helena Veríssimo de Freitas (B); 5. Domingos Augusto Ramalho Pereira (A)
Suíça (Roma, Viena) (5)	Liechtenstein	Zurich	Vaduz	309	305	7	1. António Guerra Iria (B); 2. Ângela Guilhermina Tavares Barbosa dos Reis (B); 3. José Pio Bemposta (B); 4. Helena Veríssimo de Freitas (B); 5. Domingos Augusto Ramalho Pereira (A)
Timor-Leste (1)	East Timor	Dili		1,270	56	2	1. Filipe Martins da Silva (A)
Turquia (Ankara, Bucareste, Atenas, Sófia, Nicósia, Budapeste, Moscovo, Belgrado, Kiev, Zagrebe) (1)	Bulgaria	Sofia	Sofia	307	No candidate stood for election		
Turquia (Ankara, Bucareste, Atenas, Sófia, Nicósia, Budapeste, Moscovo, Belgrado, Kiev, Zagrebe) (1)	Kosovo	Sofia	Pristina	10	No candidate stood for election		
Turquia (Ankara, Bucareste, Atenas, Sófia, Nicósia, Budapeste, Moscovo, Belgrado, Kiev, Zagrebe) (1)	Greece	Athens		414	No candidate stood for election		
Turquia (Ankara, Bucareste, Atenas, Sófia, Nicósia, Budapeste, Moscovo, Belgrado, Kiev, Zagrebe) (1)	Hungary	Budapest		258	No candidate stood for election		
Turquia (Ankara, Bucareste, Atenas, Sófia, Nicósia, Budapeste, Moscovo, Belgrado, Kiev, Zagrebe) (1)	Serbia	Belgrade	Belgrade	110	No candidate stood for election		
Turquia (Ankara, Bucareste, Atenas, Sófia, Nicósia, Budapeste, Moscovo, Belgrado, Kiev, Zagrebe) (1)	Montenegro	Belgrade	Podgorica	4	No candidate stood for election		
Turquia (Ankara, Bucareste, Atenas, Sófia, Nicósia, Budapeste, Moscovo, Belgrado, Kiev, Zagrebe) (1)	North Macedonia	Belgrade	Skopje	17	No candidate stood for election		
Turquia (Ankara, Bucareste, Atenas, Sófia, Nicósia, Budapeste, Moscovo, Belgrado, Kiev, Zagrebe) (1)	Bosnia and Herzegovina	Belgrade	Sarajevo	4	No candidate stood for election		
Turquia (Ankara, Bucareste, Atenas, Sófia, Nicósia, Budapeste, Moscovo, Belgrado, Kiev, Zagrebe) (1)	Romania	Bucharest	Bucharest	370	No candidate stood for election		
Turquia (Ankara, Bucareste, Atenas, Sófia, Nicósia, Budapeste, Moscovo, Belgrado, Kiev, Zagrebe) (1)	Moldova	Bucharest	Chișinău	524	No candidate stood for election		
Turquia (Ankara, Bucareste, Atenas, Sófia, Nicósia, Budapeste, Moscovo, Belgrado, Kiev, Zagrebe) (1)	Russia	Moscow	Moscow	232	No candidate stood for election		
Turquia (Ankara, Bucareste, Atenas, Sófia, Nicósia, Budapeste, Moscovo, Belgrado, Kiev, Zagrebe) (1)	Uzbekistan	Moscow	Tashkent	0	No candidate stood for election		
Turquia (Ankara, Bucareste, Atenas, Sófia, Nicósia, Budapeste, Moscovo, Belgrado, Kiev, Zagrebe) (1)	Tajikistan	Moscow	Dushanbe	3	No candidate stood for election		
Turquia (Ankara, Bucareste, Atenas, Sófia, Nicósia, Budapeste, Moscovo, Belgrado, Kiev, Zagrebe) (1)	Belarus	Moscow	Minsk	3	No candidate stood for election		
Turquia (Ankara, Bucareste, Atenas, Sófia, Nicósia, Budapeste, Moscovo, Belgrado, Kiev, Zagrebe) (1)	Armenia	Moscow	Yerevan	0	No candidate stood for election		
Turquia (Ankara, Bucareste, Atenas, Sófia, Nicósia, Budapeste, Moscovo, Belgrado, Kiev, Zagrebe) (1)	Ukraine	Kyiv		86	No candidate stood for election		
Turquia (Ankara, Bucareste, Atenas, Sófia, Nicósia, Budapeste, Moscovo, Belgrado, Kiev, Zagrebe) (1)	Croatia	Zagreb		60	No candidate stood for election		
Turquia (Ankara, Bucareste, Atenas, Sófia, Nicósia, Budapeste, Moscovo, Belgrado, Kiev, Zagrebe) (1)	Turkey	Ankara	Ankara	535	No candidate stood for election		
Turquia (Ankara, Bucareste, Atenas, Sófia, Nicósia, Budapeste, Moscovo, Belgrado, Kiev, Zagrebe) (1)	Turkey	Ankara	Istanbul	3,367	No candidate stood for election		
Turquia (Ankara, Bucareste, Atenas, Sófia, Nicósia, Budapeste, Moscovo, Belgrado, Kiev, Zagrebe) (1)	Turkmenistan	Ankara	Ashgabat	0	No candidate stood for election		
Turquia (Ankara, Bucareste, Atenas, Sófia, Nicósia, Budapeste, Moscovo, Belgrado, Kiev, Zagrebe) (1)	Georgia	Ankara	Tbilisi	12	No candidate stood for election		
Turquia (Ankara, Bucareste, Atenas, Sófia, Nicósia, Budapeste, Moscovo, Belgrado, Kiev, Zagrebe) (1)	Azerbaijan	Ankara	Baku	4	No candidate stood for election		
Turquia (Ankara, Bucareste, Atenas, Sófia, Nicósia, Budapeste, Moscovo, Belgrado, Kiev, Zagrebe) (1)	Afghanistan	Ankara	Kabul	2	No candidate stood for election		
Turquia (Ankara, Bucareste, Atenas, Sófia, Nicósia, Budapeste, Moscovo, Belgrado, Kiev, Zagrebe) (1)	Cyprus	Nicosia	Nicosia	317	No candidate stood for election		
Turquia (Ankara, Bucareste, Atenas, Sófia, Nicósia, Budapeste, Moscovo, Belgrado, Kiev, Zagrebe) (1)	Syria	Nicosia	Aleppo	0	No candidate stood for election		
Turquia (Ankara, Bucareste, Atenas, Sófia, Nicósia, Budapeste, Moscovo, Belgrado, Kiev, Zagrebe) (1)	Syria	Nicosia	Damascus	2	No candidate stood for election		
Turquia (Ankara, Bucareste, Atenas, Sófia, Nicósia, Budapeste, Moscovo, Belgrado, Kiev, Zagrebe) (1)	Lebanon	Nicosia	Beirut	54	No candidate stood for election		
Uruguai (1)	Uruguay	Montevideo		1,185	58	0	1. Manuel Fernando Correia Vilar (A)
Venezuela - Caracas (Bogotá, Panamá, Havana) (4)	Colombia	Bogotá	Bogotá	841	443	7	1. José Fernando Campos da Silva Topa (A); 2. Marina Neves Correia Pereira (A); 3. José Alberto de Viveiros Fernandes (A); 4. Maria Fátima Teixeira Leite (A)
Venezuela - Caracas (Bogotá, Panamá, Havana) (4)	Ecuador	Bogotá	Guayaquil	202	443	7	1. José Fernando Campos da Silva Topa (A); 2. Marina Neves Correia Pereira (A); 3. José Alberto de Viveiros Fernandes (A); 4. Maria Fátima Teixeira Leite (A)
Venezuela - Caracas (Bogotá, Panamá, Havana) (4)	Ecuador	Bogotá	Quito	137	443	7	1. José Fernando Campos da Silva Topa (A); 2. Marina Neves Correia Pereira (A); 3. José Alberto de Viveiros Fernandes (A); 4. Maria Fátima Teixeira Leite (A)
Venezuela - Caracas (Bogotá, Panamá, Havana) (4)	Saint Lucia	Bogotá	Castries	0	443	7	1. José Fernando Campos da Silva Topa (A); 2. Marina Neves Correia Pereira (A); 3. José Alberto de Viveiros Fernandes (A); 4. Maria Fátima Teixeira Leite (A)
Venezuela - Caracas (Bogotá, Panamá, Havana) (4)	Dominica	Bogotá	Roseau	1	443	7	1. José Fernando Campos da Silva Topa (A); 2. Marina Neves Correia Pereira (A); 3. José Alberto de Viveiros Fernandes (A); 4. Maria Fátima Teixeira Leite (A)
Venezuela - Caracas (Bogotá, Panamá, Havana) (4)	Cuba	Havana	Havana	16	443	7	1. José Fernando Campos da Silva Topa (A); 2. Marina Neves Correia Pereira (A); 3. José Alberto de Viveiros Fernandes (A); 4. Maria Fátima Teixeira Leite (A)
Venezuela - Caracas (Bogotá, Panamá, Havana) (4)	Haiti	Havana	Port-au-Prince	0	443	7	1. José Fernando Campos da Silva Topa (A); 2. Marina Neves Correia Pereira (A); 3. José Alberto de Viveiros Fernandes (A); 4. Maria Fátima Teixeira Leite (A)
Venezuela - Caracas (Bogotá, Panamá, Havana) (4)	Venezuela	Caracas	Caracas	28,350	443	7	1. José Fernando Campos da Silva Topa (A); 2. Marina Neves Correia Pereira (A); 3. José Alberto de Viveiros Fernandes (A); 4. Maria Fátima Teixeira Leite (A)
Venezuela - Caracas (Bogotá, Panamá, Havana) (4)	Venezuela	Caracas	Ciudad Guayana	16	443	7	1. José Fernando Campos da Silva Topa (A); 2. Marina Neves Correia Pereira (A); 3. José Alberto de Viveiros Fernandes (A); 4. Maria Fátima Teixeira Leite (A)
Venezuela - Caracas (Bogotá, Panamá, Havana) (4)	Venezuela	Caracas	Barcelona	1,286	443	7	1. José Fernando Campos da Silva Topa (A); 2. Marina Neves Correia Pereira (A); 3. José Alberto de Viveiros Fernandes (A); 4. Maria Fátima Teixeira Leite (A)
Venezuela - Caracas (Bogotá, Panamá, Havana) (4)	Venezuela	Caracas	Guatire	8	443	7	1. José Fernando Campos da Silva Topa (A); 2. Marina Neves Correia Pereira (A); 3. José Alberto de Viveiros Fernandes (A); 4. Maria Fátima Teixeira Leite (A)
Venezuela - Caracas (Bogotá, Panamá, Havana) (4)	Venezuela	Caracas	La Guaira	19	443	7	1. José Fernando Campos da Silva Topa (A); 2. Marina Neves Correia Pereira (A); 3. José Alberto de Viveiros Fernandes (A); 4. Maria Fátima Teixeira Leite (A)
Venezuela - Caracas (Bogotá, Panamá, Havana) (4)	Venezuela	Caracas	Porlamar	399	443	7	1. José Fernando Campos da Silva Topa (A); 2. Marina Neves Correia Pereira (A); 3. José Alberto de Viveiros Fernandes (A); 4. Maria Fátima Teixeira Leite (A)
Venezuela - Caracas (Bogotá, Panamá, Havana) (4)	Venezuela	Caracas	Los Teques	2,824	443	7	1. José Fernando Campos da Silva Topa (A); 2. Marina Neves Correia Pereira (A); 3. José Alberto de Viveiros Fernandes (A); 4. Maria Fátima Teixeira Leite (A)
Venezuela - Caracas (Bogotá, Panamá, Havana) (4)	Anguilla	Caracas	The Valley	0	443	7	1. José Fernando Campos da Silva Topa (A); 2. Marina Neves Correia Pereira (A); 3. José Alberto de Viveiros Fernandes (A); 4. Maria Fátima Teixeira Leite (A)
Venezuela - Caracas (Bogotá, Panamá, Havana) (4)	Barbados	Caracas	Bridgetown	4	443	7	1. José Fernando Campos da Silva Topa (A); 2. Marina Neves Correia Pereira (A); 3. José Alberto de Viveiros Fernandes (A); 4. Maria Fátima Teixeira Leite (A)
Venezuela - Caracas (Bogotá, Panamá, Havana) (4)	Grenada	Caracas	St. George	2	443	7	1. José Fernando Campos da Silva Topa (A); 2. Marina Neves Correia Pereira (A); 3. José Alberto de Viveiros Fernandes (A); 4. Maria Fátima Teixeira Leite (A)
Venezuela - Caracas (Bogotá, Panamá, Havana) (4)	British Virgin Islands	Caracas	Road Town	2	443	7	1. José Fernando Campos da Silva Topa (A); 2. Marina Neves Correia Pereira (A); 3. José Alberto de Viveiros Fernandes (A); 4. Maria Fátima Teixeira Leite (A)
Venezuela - Caracas (Bogotá, Panamá, Havana) (4)	Jamaica	Caracas	Kingston	7	443	7	1. José Fernando Campos da Silva Topa (A); 2. Marina Neves Correia Pereira (A); 3. José Alberto de Viveiros Fernandes (A); 4. Maria Fátima Teixeira Leite (A)
Venezuela - Caracas (Bogotá, Panamá, Havana) (4)	Montserrat	Caracas	Brades	0	443	7	1. José Fernando Campos da Silva Topa (A); 2. Marina Neves Correia Pereira (A); 3. José Alberto de Viveiros Fernandes (A); 4. Maria Fátima Teixeira Leite (A)
Venezuela - Caracas (Bogotá, Panamá, Havana) (4)	Saint Kitts and Nevis	Caracas	Basseterre	1	443	7	1. José Fernando Campos da Silva Topa (A); 2. Marina Neves Correia Pereira (A); 3. José Alberto de Viveiros Fernandes (A); 4. Maria Fátima Teixeira Leite (A)
Venezuela - Caracas (Bogotá, Panamá, Havana) (4)	Saint Vincent and the Grenadines	Caracas	Kingstown	0	443	7	1. José Fernando Campos da Silva Topa (A); 2. Marina Neves Correia Pereira (A); 3. José Alberto de Viveiros Fernandes (A); 4. Maria Fátima Teixeira Leite (A)
Venezuela - Caracas (Bogotá, Panamá, Havana) (4)	Suriname	Caracas	Paramaribo	1	443	7	1. José Fernando Campos da Silva Topa (A); 2. Marina Neves Correia Pereira (A); 3. José Alberto de Viveiros Fernandes (A); 4. Maria Fátima Teixeira Leite (A)
Venezuela - Caracas (Bogotá, Panamá, Havana) (4)	Trinidad and Tobago	Caracas	Port of Spain	95	443	7	1. José Fernando Campos da Silva Topa (A); 2. Marina Neves Correia Pereira (A); 3. José Alberto de Viveiros Fernandes (A); 4. Maria Fátima Teixeira Leite (A)
Venezuela - Caracas (Bogotá, Panamá, Havana) (4)	Antigua and Barbuda	Caracas	St. John	0	443	7	1. José Fernando Campos da Silva Topa (A); 2. Marina Neves Correia Pereira (A); 3. José Alberto de Viveiros Fernandes (A); 4. Maria Fátima Teixeira Leite (A)
Venezuela - Caracas (Bogotá, Panamá, Havana) (4)	Guyana	Caracas	Georgetown	16	443	7	1. José Fernando Campos da Silva Topa (A); 2. Marina Neves Correia Pereira (A); 3. José Alberto de Viveiros Fernandes (A); 4. Maria Fátima Teixeira Leite (A)
Venezuela - Caracas (Bogotá, Panamá, Havana) (4)	Panama	Panama	Panama City	1,466	443	7	1. José Fernando Campos da Silva Topa (A); 2. Marina Neves Correia Pereira (A); 3. José Alberto de Viveiros Fernandes (A); 4. Maria Fátima Teixeira Leite (A)
Venezuela - Caracas (Bogotá, Panamá, Havana) (4)	Costa Rica	Panama	San José	250	443	7	1. José Fernando Campos da Silva Topa (A); 2. Marina Neves Correia Pereira (A); 3. José Alberto de Viveiros Fernandes (A); 4. Maria Fátima Teixeira Leite (A)
Venezuela - Caracas (Bogotá, Panamá, Havana) (4)	Nicaragua	Panama	Managua	8	443	7	1. José Fernando Campos da Silva Topa (A); 2. Marina Neves Correia Pereira (A); 3. José Alberto de Viveiros Fernandes (A); 4. Maria Fátima Teixeira Leite (A)
Venezuela - Valência (2)	Venezuela	Valencia	Valencia	11,469	565	4	1. Maria Fátima de Pontes Loreto (B); 2. Leonel Moniz da Silva (A)
Venezuela - Valência (2)	Venezuela	Valencia	Maracay	6,359	565	4	1. Maria Fátima de Pontes Loreto (B); 2. Leonel Moniz da Silva (A)
Venezuela - Valência (2)	Venezuela	Valencia	Barquisimeto	1,457	565	4	1. Maria Fátima de Pontes Loreto (B); 2. Leonel Moniz da Silva (A)
Venezuela - Valência (2)	Venezuela	Valencia	Maracaibo	88	565	4	1. Maria Fátima de Pontes Loreto (B); 2. Leonel Moniz da Silva (A)
Venezuela - Valência (2)	Venezuela	Valencia	Mérida	428	565	4	1. Maria Fátima de Pontes Loreto (B); 2. Leonel Moniz da Silva (A)
Venezuela - Valência (2)	Venezuela	Valencia	San Cristóbal	307	565	4	1. Maria Fátima de Pontes Loreto (B); 2. Leonel Moniz da Silva (A)

=== 2015 ===
On 9 June 2015, Secretary of State for the Portuguese Communities, José Cesário, called for elections to take place on 6 September 2015.
