= Agrobom =

Locality and former civil parish in Portugal

- Civil parish
- Location of the civil parish of Agrobom within the municipality of Alfândega da Fé
- Coordinates: 41°23′36″N 6°54′36″W
- Country: Portugal
- Region: Norte
- Intermunic. comm.: Terras de Trás-os-Montes
- District: Bragança
- Municipality: Alfândega da Fé
- Established: Settlement: fl. 1800; Parish: c. 1832; Civil parish: c. 1916

Area
  - Total: 14.97 km^{2} (5.78 sq mi)
- Elevation: 407 m (1,335 ft)

Population (2001)
  - Total: 150
  - Density: 10/km^{2} (26/sq mi)
- Time zone: UTC+00:00 (WET)
  - Summer (DST): UTC+01:00 (WEST)
- Postal code: 5350-101
- Area code: 279
- Patron: São Miguel Arcanjo

Agrobom is a former civil parish, located in the municipality of Alfândega da Fé, in northern Portugal. In 2013, the parish merged into the new parish Agrobom, Saldonha e Vale Pereiro. It has less than 150 inhabitants in an area of 14.97 km^{2} against the flank of the Serra de Bornes.

== History ==
The name of the parish comes from its situation, in an area that was fertile and able to support agriculture; the Portuguese etymological name for good field (Portuguese: campo bom). Its population has, since its settlement, been tied to agriculture.

Agrobom was the first ecclesiastical parish in the municipality of Alfândega da Fé and its parish seat includes the village of Felgueiras. Although the settlement is quite old, few records exist to mark its age, although a Roman era castro was known to have existed in the area (remnants of its form no longer exist).

Of the ecclesiastical parish, which was located 18 kilometres from the municipal seat, it was known to be a patron of Royal Houses, and provided a wealthy rent for the local abbey.

At one time the parish of Vale Pereiro, today independent, was a locality of Agrobom, when Agrobom was a parish of Castro Vicente (until 1855).

== Geography ==
Located 10 kilometres north west of the municipal seat, surrounded by the parishes of Eira da Cruz (in the west), Gebelim (in the northwest), Saldonha (in the east), Sambade (to the west), Soeima (to the northwest) and Vale Pereiro (to the southwest). In addition, the parish has a corner of its frontier with the municipality of Macedo de Cavaleiros.

The parish, stretches down the southern flank of the Serra de Bornes on an escarpment divided by the Ribeira de Agrobom (on the east) and a river-valley (to the west).

A main roadway (Municipal EM 590) connects the villages of Agrobom and Felgueiras with Vila Preira (to the southeast), running from the north to south, to the village of Vale Pereiro.

== Economy ==
Olive oil, almonds and fruit orchards are the primary sources of income in this region, supported by irrigation from Camba Dam. Within the deep and narrow channel of the Ribeira de Agrobom, the residents still cultivate many basic staples, due to a mild micro-climate.

== Architecture ==
=== Religious ===
- Matriz Church of São Miguel (English: Archangel Michael) – located in the centre of Agrobom, it is constructed in the Baroque-style, consisting of one nave and a main chapel, embossed in gold-leaf, carved in the Joanino-style;
- Chapel of São Sebastião;
- Chapel of São Lourenço – located in the settlement of Felgueiras
- Chapel of Santa Marinha (English: Holy Marines) – in ruins, legend says that the saint of the chapel was disputed between Agrobom and Sambade at one time. During the evening, the saint moved the course of the ravine in order to show its preference for the parish of Argobom.

== Culture ==
The community celebrates several religious holidays throughout the year, the most important being: the Festival of Nossa Senhora da Graça (on the second Sunday of August), the Festival of São Sebastião (on 20 January), and the Festival of São Lourenço (in the village of Felgueiras on 10 August).
