= Zinha Vaz =

Bissau-Guinean activist and politician

Francisca Maria Monteira e Silva Vaz , better known as Zinha Vaz (born 4 October 1952), is a Bissau-Guinean women's rights activist and politician. She has been a member of the National People's Assembly for several terms for the Resistance of Guinea-Bissau-Bafatá Movement, as well as a presidential advisor. In 1999 she served for a brief time as mayor of the capital city Bissau. She was jailed for political reasons for three years during the 1970s and in 2003 again for several days. Recently she was ambassador to Gambia.

== Early life ==
Zinha Vaz was born on 4 October 1952 in the capital city of Bissau and received her education in Portugal. She received a diploma in education from the Instituto Superior de Ciências Educativas and in sociology from the Instituto Superior de Ciências do Trabalho e da Empresa. She worked as a primary school teacher in Portugal and Guinea-Bissau. She later worked for the state gas and petroleum company DICOL as treasurer, chief of personnel and director of administration.

== Political career ==
During the 1970s Zinha Vaz was critical of the one-party system set up by the African Party for the Independence of Guinea and Cape Verde (PAIGC) after independence of Guinea-Bissau from Portugal in 1974. During the reign of President Luís Cabral she was imprisoned between 1977 and 1980. After her release from prison Zinha Vaz continued her political activism. In 1986 the execution of six high political figures, including the first Vice President and Minister of Justice Paulo Correia and former Attorney General Viriato Pã, took place. The six were accused of attempting a coup. Zinha Vaz became a founding figure of the Resistance of Guinea-Bissau-Bafatá Movement (RGB-MB).

=== Resistance of Guinea-Bissau-Bafatá Movement ===
After the first multiparty elections in 1994, she became a member of the National People's Assembly for the RGB-MB. The RGB-MB became the largest opposition party in parliament, conquering 19 out of 100 seats. Zinha Vaz was one of ten women legislators. Two of her family members also conquered seats for the RGB-MB, her brother Fernando Vaz and cousin Hélder Vaz Lopes. As a member of parliament Zinha Vaz focused on fighting corruption and abuse of power by government officials. She also tried to further the role of women in Guinea-Bissau society. As a member of the Permanent Commission of the National People's Assembly Zinha Vaz tried to mediate between President João Bernardo Vieira and Brigadier-General and coup-leader Ansumane Mané in the Guinea-Bissau Civil War of 1998–1999.

In April 1999 Zinha Vaz was named as mayor of the capital city Bissau. Her appointment as mayor led to tension in the city of Bissau as it was expected the PAIGC secretary general Paulo Medina would be appointed. Soldiers blocked off a street and set up roadblocks. Medina had earlier been mayor of the city. After Zinha Vaz was made mayor he tried to enter the buildings to retrieve documents. When Zinha Vaz tried to enter the city hall she was stopped by 24 soldiers armed with Uzi's. She found the city hall to be in state of chaos, with the airconditioners taken by her predecessor, wages not paid for a year and all out of funds. As the municipality did not have any computers, nor the funds to buy them Zinha Vaz asked with UNICEF if she could get old computers from them. During her time in office she also tried to upgrade the system of garbage collection in the city as to lessen the chance of a cholera outbreak.

Zinha Vaz was reelected to the National People's Assembly on 28 November 1999 and gave up her position as mayor. During the same general elections Kumba Ialá of the Party for Social Renewal won the Presidency. A coalition government under Prime Minister Caetano N'Tchama was set up in 2000 with help from RGB-MB and Zinha Vaz was made presidential advisor for political and diplomatic affairs. However, the coalition government fell one year later as RGB-MB politicians in the National People's Assembly managed to pass a motion of no-confidence. The five RGB-MB members of the cabinet then withdrew, including her cousin Hélder Vaz Lopes (Minister of Economy and Regional Development) and brother Fernando Vaz (Secretary of State for Transport).

On 12 February 2003 Zinha Vaz was arrested and detained in the Segunda Esquadra police station, as she was still a member of the National People's Assembly she had immunity and the arrest was therefore illegal. She had responded to President Kumba Ialá's defamation of her father, João Vaz. Ialá had called Vaz a traitor of Bissau-Guinean nationalist movement leader, Amílcar Cabral, to the Portuguese PIDE. Zinha Vaz had responded by saying that when Kumba Ialá was still a member of PAIGC in 1986 he had denounced the victims of the executions that led to the founding of the RGB-MB. Zinha Vaz was released from jail two days after her arrest, a travel ban was in place for her until July. For Ialá the incident had no further consequences as he wished to appoint Zinha Vaz Minister of Foreign Affairs on 31 June 2003. She however refused.

=== Guinean Patriotic Union ===
In 2003 the RGB-MB fell apart and Zinha Vaz left the party together with her family members. Together they founded the Plataforma Unida, which disbanded five years later. After the 2004 National People's Assembly election she founded the Guinean Patriotic Union which did not participate in the Presidential elections of 2005, but supported PAIGC-candidate Malam Bacai Sanhá. He however lost to former President João Bernardo Vieira who had been deposed in the Civil War of 1999–2000. The Guinean Patriotic Union was the first party in Guinea-Bissau founded by a woman. The Guinean Patriotic Union competed in the 2008 parliamentary elections but did not manage to capture any seats, winning 0,61% of the total vote. Zinha Vaz was the party candidate for the Presidential elections of 2009, finishing ninth of eleven.

Zinha Vaz was later made ambassador to Gambia; she served in that capacity until 6 November 2012.

== Women's rights ==
Between 1992 and 2002 Zinha Vaz was the founder and president of the Women's Association of Economic Activity of Guinea-Bissau, as well as the Popular Creditbank Bambaram. The Bank provided funds for women working in the informal section of the economy. Between 1994 and 1999 Zinha Vaz was also president of the ad hoc Commission of Women and Child of the National People's Assembly.

== Additional sources ==
- Karibe Mendy, Peter & Lobban Jr. (2013). Historical Dictionary of the Republic of Guinea-Bissau. Scarecrow Press. ISBN 9780810880276.
