= José Cesário =

Portuguese politician

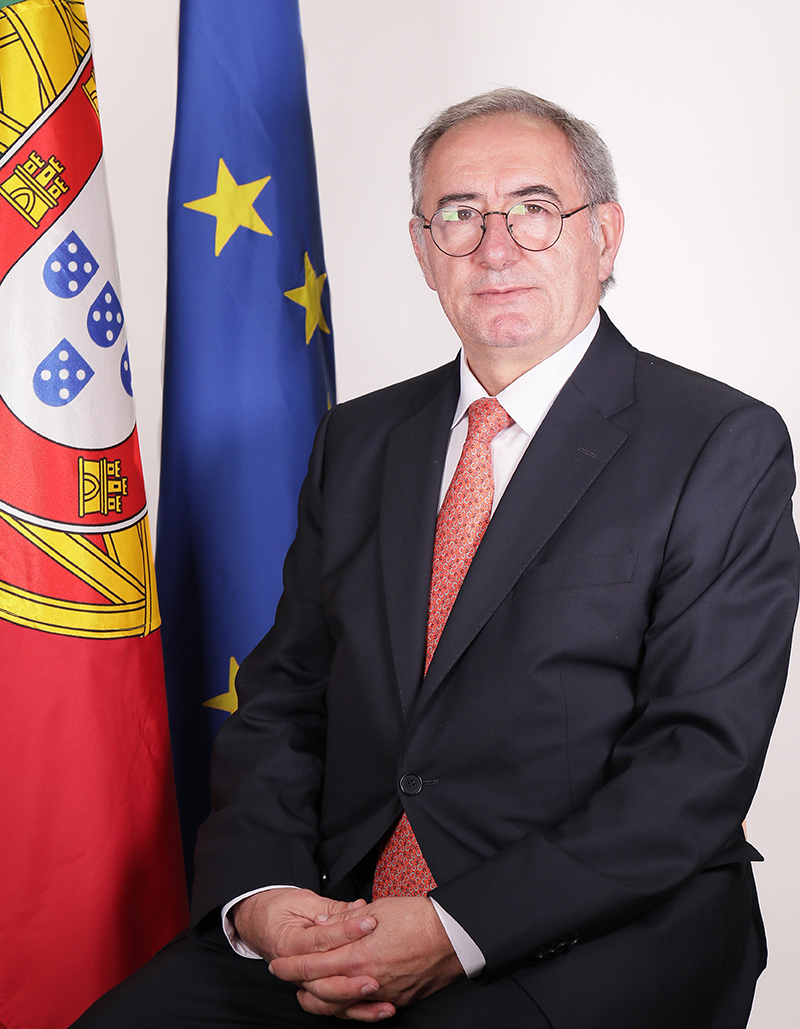
- Official portrait, 2024

Member of the Assembly of the Republic
- Incumbent
- Assumed office 26 March 2024
- Constituency: Outside Europe
- In office 31 May 1983 – 29 March 2022
- Constituency: Viseu (1983–2005); Outside Europe (2005–2022)

Secretary of State for the Portuguese Communities
- In office 5 April 2024 – 6 June 2025
- Prime Minister: Luís Montenegro
- Minister: Paulo Rangel
- In office 21 June 2011 – 26 November 2015
- Prime Minister: Pedro Passos Coelho
- Minister: Paulo Portas; Rui Machete
- In office 6 April 2002 – 17 July 2004
- Prime Minister: José Manuel Barroso
- Minister: António Martins da Cruz; Teresa Patrício de Gouveia

Secretary of State of Local Administration
- In office 17 July 2004 – 12 March 2005
- Prime Minister: Pedro Santana Lopes
- Minister: Luís Nobre Guedes

Personal details
- Born: José de Almeida Cesário; 20 July 1958 (age 68) Viseu, Portugal
- Party: Social Democratic Party
- Other political affiliations: Social Democratic Youth
- Spouse: Maria de Lurdes Cesário
- Education: Instituto Superior de Lisboa e Vale do Tejo
- Occupation: Teacher • politician

José de Almeida Cesário (born 20 July 1958) is a Portuguese teacher and politician. He was a member of the Assembly of the Republic for the Social Democratic Party from 1983 until 2022. He has a degree in School Administration and Management and he is a basic education teacher.

He was Secretary of State for Portuguese Communities in the XV, XIX and XX Constitutional Governments and Secretary of State of Local Administration in the XVI Constitutional Government.

In January 2024, he was announced as candidate number one, on Democratic Alliance's list for the Outside Europe constituency for the 2024 legislative elections.
