= Berta Nunes =

Portuguese doctor and politician

Berta Nunes ComM
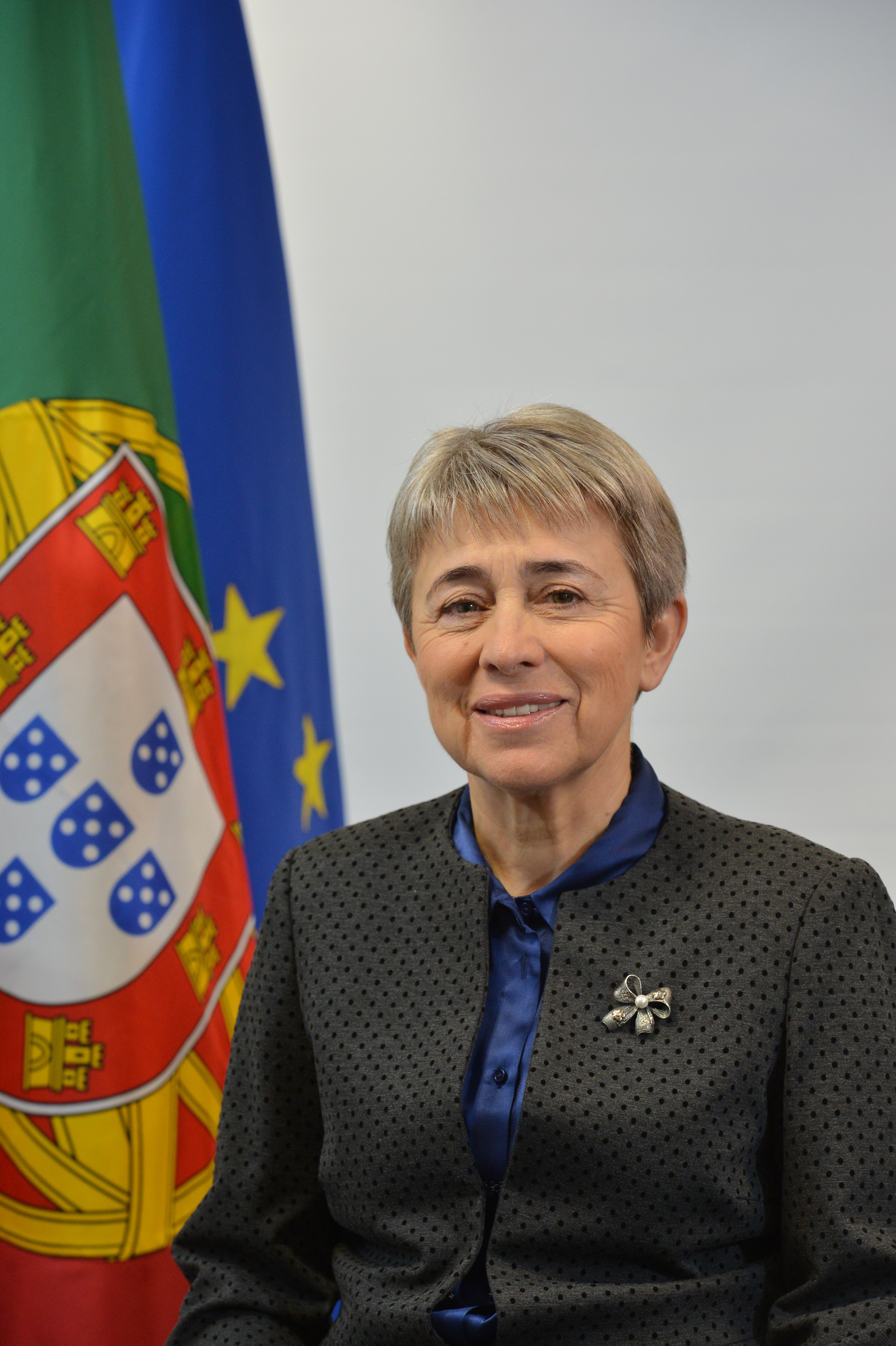

Secretary of State for the Portuguese Communities
- In office 26 October 2019 – 30 March 2022
- Prime Minister: António Costa
- Preceded by: José Luís Carneiro
- Succeeded by: Paulo Cafôfo

Mayor of Alfândega da Fé
- In office 2 November 2009 – 7 October 2019
- Preceded by: João Sarmento
- Succeeded by: Eduardo Tavares

Member of the Assembly of the Republic
- In office 29 March 2022 – 25 March 2024
- Constituency: Bragança

Personal details
- Born: Berta Ferreira Milheiro Nunes; 25 October 1955 (age 70) Santa Maria da Feira, Portugal
- Party: Socialist Party
- Spouse: Diamantino Soeiro Lopes
- Education: University of Porto; Abel Salazar Biomedical Sciences Institute

Berta Ferreira Milheiro Nunes (born 25 October 1955) is a Portuguese doctor and politician. She was mayor of the city of Alfândega da Fé in the northeast of Portugal and in 2019 was appointed Secretary of State for the Portuguese Communities, with responsibility for the Portuguese diaspora.

== Education ==
Berta Ferreira Milheiro Nunes was born in Santa Maria da Feira in the Aveiro District of Portugal on 25 October 1955. She completed primary education in her home town and then went to secondary school in Vila Nova de Gaia. She studied at the Faculty of Medicine of the University of Porto, graduating in 1980 and receiving the Engenheiro António de Almeida award for obtaining the highest marks of any medicine student in Portugal in that year. Moving to the small town of Alfândega da Fé, she worked at the city's Health Centre from 1985. She was a member of the Advisory Council and the Commission of the Federação Nacional dos Médicos (National Federation of Medical Unions - FNAM) from 1992 to 1995. In 1996 she received a PhD in Community Medicine from the Abel Salazar Biomedical Sciences Institute, with a thesis entitled "Ideas and Practices of the Laity in relation to the Body and Health".

== Career ==
In 1996, after obtaining her PhD, Nunes was appointed Director of the Alfândega da Fé Health Centre, a position she held until 2002. She has indicated that she moved to this small town because she does not like cities. She worked at the UTAD Health Centre in Miranda do Douro from 2003 to 2005, teaching medical anthropology. In 2005, she became Coordinator of the Health Sub-Region of Bragança. Nunes joined the World Organization of Family Doctors (WONCA) and became a member of WONCA's Rural Practice Working Group, a group of rural doctors worldwide that studies and investigates the specifics of health problems in rural areas. She was also a member of the Board of EURIPA, the European Rural and Isolated Practitioners Association. Among her other activities, Nunes was the founder and President of the Association for the Promotion of Welfare (APBE), a youth association that works in the area of health promotion. She was co-founder of the League of Friends of the Alfândega da Fé Health Centre, which has carried out innovative projects in health and social areas. She worked with the University of Porto Faculty of Medicine on an internship programme for medical students in rural Health Centres. Nunes is also an ethnobotanist, rescuing knowledge about plants that have fallen into disuse.

== Politics ==
In 2009, as a member of the Portuguese Socialist Party (PS), she was elected as President of the Alfândega da Fé City Council. She was re-elected in 2013 and 2017. She was an active member of the National Association of Municipalities. In 2019 Nunes ran as a candidate for the national Assembly of the Republic to represent Bragança. She was second on her party's list but the party only received sufficient votes to send one deputy to Lisbon. After the elections, when António Costa, the leader of the PS, retained the role of Prime Minister, Nunes was appointed Secretary of State for Portuguese Communities.

== Awards and honours ==
- In 2003, Nunes was made a Commander of the Portuguese Order of Merit, for services provided in the area of health.
- She was awarded the Medal of Merit of the Portuguese Medical Association in 2014.

== Publications ==
- O saber médico do povo (The people's medical knowledge).
