= Agrobom, Saldonha e Vale Pereiro =

- Civil parish
- Location in Portugal
- Coordinates: 41.396°N 6.916°W
- Country: Portugal
- Region: Norte
- Intermunic. comm.: Terras de Trás-os-Montes
- District: Bragança
- Municipality: Alfândega da Fé

Area
  - Total: 32.60 km^{2} (12.59 sq mi)

Population (2011)
  - Total: 265
  - Density: 8.13/km^{2} (21.1/sq mi)
- Time zone: UTC+00:00 (WET)
  - Summer (DST): UTC+01:00 (WEST)

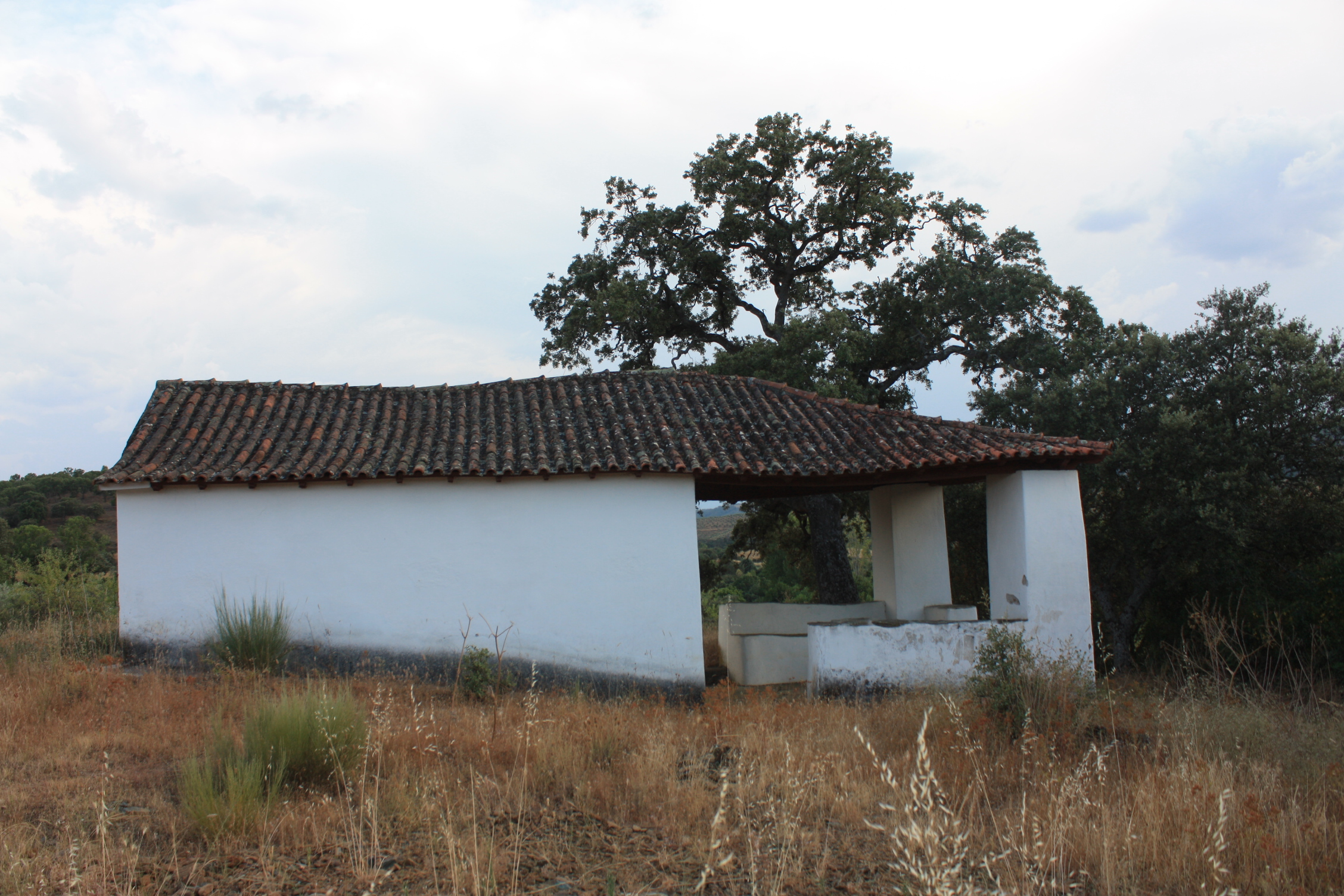
Chapel of Saint Gerald - Alfândega da Fé - Portugal.

Agrobom, Saldonha e Vale Pereiro is a civil parish in the municipality of Alfândega da Fé, Portugal. It was formed in 2013 by the merger of the former parishes Agrobom, Saldonha and Vale Pereiro. The population in 2011 was 265, in an area of 32.60 km^{2} (12.59 sq mi).
