= Cerejais (Alfândega da Fé) =

- Civil parish
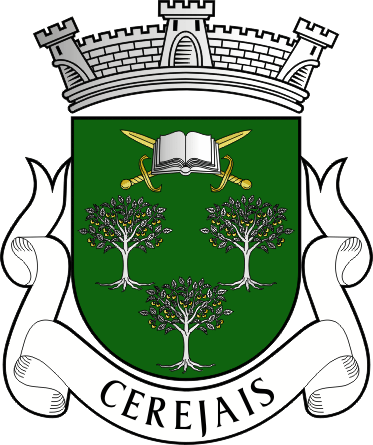
- Coat of arms

- Coordinates: 41.294°N 6.922°W
- Country: Portugal
- Region: Norte
- Intermunic. comm.: Terras de Trás-os-Montes
- District: Bragança
- Municipality: Alfândega da Fé

Area
  - Total: 17.00 km^{2} (6.56 sq mi)

Population (2011)
  - Total: 202
  - Density: 11.9/km^{2} (30.8/sq mi)
- Time zone: UTC+00:00 (WET)
  - Summer (DST): UTC+01:00 (WEST)
- Postal code: 5350
- Area code: 279
- Patron: São Paulo
- Website: https://web.archive.org/web/20110912030532/http://www.cerejais.com/

Cerejais is a freguesia ("civil parish") in the municipality of Alfândega da Fé, in continental Portugal. The population in 2011 was 202, in an area of 17.00 km^{2}.

== History ==
A settlement in the area of Cerejais dates back to the 9th century. The origin of its name is also remotely associated with the Ceresales, Cersares and Cersales, a zone historically known for the cultivation of cherries and cherry orchards.

In 1706, from the writings of Father Carvalho da Costa, the settlement had about 70 homes. Later (1758), in the Memórias Paroquiais, the clergy in the settlement are represented by the rector of Alfândega da Fé, receiving annual 8$000 reis stipend. By 1759, the lands of Cerejais were owned by the estate of the Marquis of Távora; that year, the Marquess' lands and property were confiscated by the state, stemming from the events of the Távora affair.

In 1855, until that year, the parish pertained to the municipality of Chacim, passing to Torre de Moncorvo and shortly later to Alfândega da Fé.

Even with these changes, by 1926, the settlement had no less than 79 homes and 311 inhabitants.

== Geography ==
The parish of Cerejais is situated on a plateau, near the Sabor River. As from 2013, the construction of the Sabor dam ("Barragem do Baixo Sabor") terminated, resulting in a radical change in the landscape around the village, which can best be observed from the top of the Inculcas rocks ("Fragas das Inculcas"). The dam has left two historical hamlets ("quintas") that used to belong to Cerejais: Quinta Branca ("White Hamlet") and Quinta de Sao Goncalo ("St Goncalo's Hamlet"). The latter is often referred to as the "Quinta do Abreu" by the local's, in memory of one of its last inhabitants, who lived there until the late nineties. A statue of Sao Goncalo, originally from the Quinta de Sao Goncalo chapel, is kept in Cerejais. In the past, a number of families lives in these two locations by the river and a teacher taught there too at some point, reflecting the large number of children that existed.

Cerejais is located 8 kilometres from the municipal seat, south of the parish of Alfândega da Fé between the neighbouring parishes of Ferredosa and Sendim da Serra, to the west, and Sendim da Ribeira and Parada, in the east.

Two important buildings in the parish included the pre-school and the primary school (Portuguese: Escola Primária do 1º Ciclo do Ensino Básico), and the seniors centre (Portuguese: Lar da Terceira Idade). The pre-school first functioned as a chapel, and later as a youth club, but it no longer exists in its original form. It is now a much smaller building (Capela de Santa Ana).

== Economy ==
Traditionally, agriculture has been the main economic activity, with the production of cherries, wheat, rye, almonds and olives (used mostly to make olive oil). Nowadays, it is mostly the production of almonds and olives that remains. Olive oil from this region is considered to be one of the best in the country and even in the world. There are two 'lagares' no longer in use, which were the press houses where the olive oil used to be made. Throughout the year, but especially during the almond harvest (August/September) and the olive harvest (around December) labourers from other villages nearby often come to work in Cerejais.

There are a few vineyards and a small wine production, usually for personal consumption. Other agricultural products that can at times be produced and sold in small scale include dried figs, walnuts, oranges and cork.

Hunted animals (e.g., hare) are sometimes also sold by hunters, as there is a considerably large association of hunters, many of whom come to hunt in Cerejais from other parts of the country during the hunting seasons. Fish can also be sold; previously fish were caught in the Sabor river (mostly 'bogas' and 'barbos'), known as one of the last wild rivers in Europe, but a dam has now been built in the area and the water volume of the river has increased massively, creating one the largest artificial lakes in the region.

'Fumeiro' (smoked sausages) such as 'alheiras', 'chouricos' and 'salpicoes', which are generally made by women, are also sold in small amounts.

In the past, the village has had shoemakers ("Sapateiros"), a bellows maker ("Foleiro"), a blacksmith ("Ferrador"), carpenter, and shepherds.

Currently, there are two construction teams and an electrician. There is a bakery that sells bread to Cerejais and to other villages nearby. Apiculture also exists; honey is often available for sale.

The care home which is part of the Santuario is the largest employer in the village. In addition to looking after elderly residents, services are provided to people from neighboring villages, including the delivery of prepared meals and housework.

'Tabernas' (taverns) were an important feature of the village in the old days, a place where people, mostly men, would gather to drink, socialise and play card games. In more recent years, the 'cafe' (cafe) became more common, with a number of them opening and closing throughout the years in Cerejais largely due to the small and volatile population. Some of those cafes included a small 'mercearia' (grocery store) for food and other essentials. More recently, the old primary school has been used as the 'associacao', which is run by the hunting association, as a kind of cafe and venue for occasional social events.

== Architecture ==
=== Religious ===
- Matriz Church of São Paulo (English: Church of Saint Paul)
- Chapel of São Sebastião (English: Chapel of Saint Sebastian)
- Chapel of the Calvário (or simply "the Calvario") (English: Chapel of the Calvary including three view points, a relatively large cross and a statue, a cave with other statues, and other small structures with 'azulejos' (tiles), all depicting biblical events)
- Chapel of the Loca (or simply "the Loca") (English: Chapel of the Loca (from the Latin "the place") including a viewpoint, a cave with statues and small marble stones with inscriptions, all with biblical references)
- Sanctuary of the Imaculado Coração de Maria ("Santuario") (English: Sanctuary of the Immaculate Heart of Mary including surrounding gardens, a statue of the King Christ (Cristo Rei), a bell tower, statues of angels at the entrance, and a number of buildings which include a care home, hostel bedrooms for visitors, and residency for priest, nuns and other religious people who often live there.)
- Chapel of Santa Ana (English: Chapel of Saint Ana)

Both the Calvário and the Loca are inspired on the chapels with the same names in the Sanctuary of Fatima. Both are accessible by car, located at less than 2 km from the village, in different directions departing from the 'Santuario'. Along the road to the Loca there are panels of azulejos (Portuguese tiles) representing the Mysteries of the Rosary; along the way to Calvario are the crosses of the 'Via Sacra' (Way of the Cross).

Other local architectonic landmarks are small miniatures of chapels or altars known as "alminhas" (literally 'little souls'). Usually white with a cross on top, they contain religious statues or images, often in azulejo representing saints, the Virgin Mary, God or an allusion to Purgatory souls. In the past, alminhas were built on the side of footpaths to remind walkers to pray for the soul of the dead. There are also two small stone crosses, one just outside the village (near the Capela de Sao Sebastiao) and one near the Rua do Lombo.

A few ruined 'pombais' (plural of 'pombal') exist around Cerejais, old buildings used to facilitate the procreation of pigeons in the old days, for human consumption.

Two 'pinocros' mark two different points which stand out for their relative altitude, in different areas. These conic structures are usually white, about 1m high and half-meter in diameter.

In different areas in and around Cerejais there are many old stone walls built to delimitate land, many in considerable state of degradation. Many of these walls are said to have been built by men from Galicia (Spain) who had come to the region the flee the Spanish civil war.

== Culture ==
In Cerejais, a number of celebrations take place throughout the year: - 'Festa de Sao Paulo' Saint Paul (in Cerejais) on 25 January, the patron saint of the village. Though not an official bank holiday, some people chose not to work on this day. The day is marked with a mass and religious procession, followed by the 'arrematacao das prendas', which refers to the live bidding of items donated by each household, mostly food or local produce. - Easter ('Pascoa'), mostly a religious celebration with mass and procession with the carrying of a statue of the dead Jesus. It is also a time for many who live away to come visit their families. Traditionally this was a day where anyone was free to ring the church's bell for as long as they please, as way of celebrating Jesus' resurrection, to many children's delight. - 'Festa do Imaculado Coração de Maria' (Festival of the Immaculate Heart of Mary) on the last Sunday of May. This celebration is solely religious and includes a procession with living statues along the way depicting biblical passages, starting at the village's church and ending at the Santuario (less than 1 km), followed by mass. Thousands of people from different parts of the country attend this celebration every year, travelling mostly by bus on day tours. - Festa de São Sebastião on the last weekend of July. This celebration includes both religious (mass and procession) and non-religious activities. Like many summer festivals in the region, the highlight is on Saturday night with the stage performance of musical bands, whilst people socialise and dance. - 'Festa dos Rosaristas', a small religious celebration on the first Sunday of October. - 'Natal' (Christmas) - like many other places across the country, Christmas is a time for family reunion in Cerejais. Beside the religious festivities, most notably the Christmas Eve mass on 24 December which usually is at or around midnight (in Portuguese, Missa do Galo), there are bonfires in many places across the country, in some parts known as 'madeiro de Natal' but not in the region of Tras-os-Montes where they are simply called 'Fogueira do Natal' (Christmas bonfire). Cerejais has the biggest Christmas bonfires in the municipality of Alfandega da Fe. Traditionally, single men would spend the afternoon of 24 December, and sometimes longer, picking up wooden branches and tree trunks from the lands. In modern times, the task became easier with the help of tractors and vans, and with the extra hands of married or older men. People gather around the fire after the Missa do Galo and spend the night socialising and singing. A number of people from Cerejais play musical instruments including guitar, Portuguese guitar and concertina, providing entertainment that night. The bonfire happens in the main square in the village- "o Olmo" ("The Elm") - named after a tree (an elm) that used to lie at its heart in the past.

Other celebrations take place, although less formally and with less frequency: - 'Entrudo' (locally, pronounced 'Antrudo'), or Carnaval (in English, Carnival), marking the beginning of Lent. Many traditions used to be associated to this day, mostly funny rituals such as pranks, music and dressing up (similar to Halloween nowadays). A human-like doll would be made of hay stuffed in clothes - the 'Entrudo' - and people, mostly young people, would walk the streets with funny costumes and carrying this figure - 'escorricar o entrudo' - followed by music and dance, and finally the burning of the entrudo. In the old days, Carnaval was known to be a day of good food amongst poorest families. - 'Sao Joao' (Saint John) on 24 June, usually for 'sardinhadas' (eating sardines), social gatherings, and entertainment. In the past, this would include the 'cascata de Sao Joao', a set of decorations such as small figures, flowers and plans, and other adornments. - 'Sao Martinho' on 11 November and the traditional 'magustos', a Portuguese word that refers to a particular celebration during this time of the year involving eating roasted chestnuts around the fire, with social gatherings, drinking and entertainment. - 'Matanca do porco' (killing of the pig) now less common in small villages due to stricter sanitary rules. Traditionally, every family would kill their pig at the start of winter, making this a day of social gathering, abundance of food (including 'rojoes') and celebration.

Gastronomically, there are a number of culinary specialties characteristic of this region, including Cerejais: - Folar da Páscoa - a sort of bread, mainly made out of flour, eggs and pork meat, baked for Easter; "Folar doce" - similar to the above but sweet and without meat. Traditionally, godchildren would keep their blessed olive or rosemary bouquet from Palm Sunday ("Domingo de Ramos") to offer it to their godmother on Easter Day, one week later. In exchange, the godmother would offer them a "Folar Doce"; Note: the "folar da Pascoa" is an Easter dish of different regions across the country however wide variations exist in the way they are prepared. - "Fumeiro" (smoked sausages) - namely "alheiras" (bread, chicken and pork), "chouriço" (pork), salpicão (pork) and "chouriço doce" (pork's blood, bread, almond and honey). Once stuffed, the spicy sausages are hung on long bars above the fireplace to be smoked over the next days. Fumeiro from this region is recognised as being of very high quality in the country. - "Doces de leite" (milk sweets) or "económicos" (economic ones) - stone baked sweets made out of flour, yeast, milk, eggs, sugar, some brandy and some orange juice; - 'Rojoes' (locally pronounced 'rijoes') - pork meat prepared when the pork is killed - "Salada de azeda" (sour salad) - are a type of wild herbs that grow in the region, particularly during the months of Spring. They are recognised for they nutritional value and are best appreciated mixed with mashed potato. - "Niscaros" (technically, "miscaros") which are wild mushrooms (Latin name: Boletus edulis) that tend to grow around local wild bushes called 'estevas'. ('Estevas' are such a common feature of the landscape that a local joke is to tell someone who has spent a long time away that they "don't even recognise the estevas anymore". - "Casulas", a kind of runner beans usually eaten in stews with potatoes and some type of fumeiro. - "Polvo" (octopus) with potatoes and cabbage (as well as bacalhau) are the traditional meal on Christmas Eve in this region
