= Segunda Esquadra =

Coordinates: 11.864°N 15.5919°W

The Segunda Esquadra is the main police station of Bissau, the capital city of Guinea-Bissau.

== Conditions ==
On 7 October 2008 several human rights violations were verified by the United Nations Peacebuilding Support Office in Guinea-Bissau. They consisted of inadequate facilities and lack of minimum living standards; lack of water and food. Several recommendations were made, which included the adoption of mechanisms for the provision of water and food and the closure of underground detention cells.

== Notable detainees ==
- Marcelino Lopes Cabral, former Defence Minister.
- Zinha Vaz, member of the National People's Assembly.
