= Secretary of State for the Portuguese Communities =

Secretary of State of the Portuguese Communities
- Arms of the Portuguese Republic

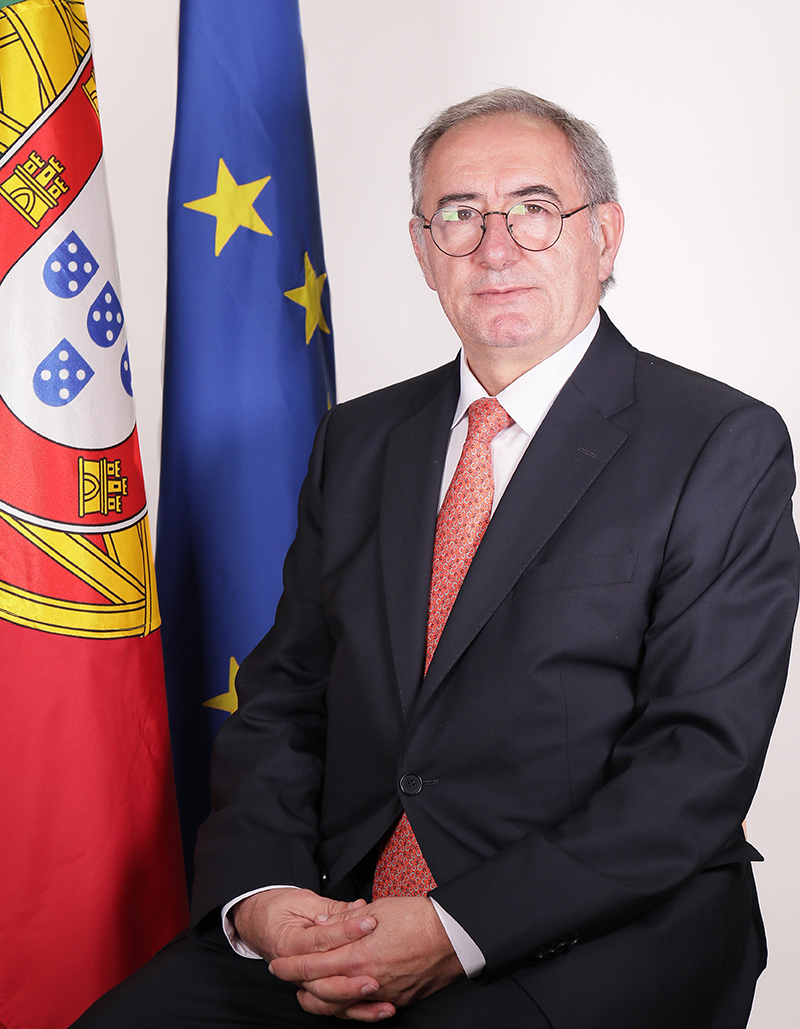
- Incumbent; José Cesário since 5 April 2024
- Reports to: Minister of Foreign Affairs
- Seat: Necessidades Palace, Estrela, Lisbon
- Appointer: President of the Republic on advice of the Prime Minister
- Formation: 23 July 1976 as Secretary of State for Emigration
- First holder: João Vieira de Lima
- Website: www.portaldascomunidades.mne.gov.pt

The Secretary of State for the Portuguese Communities (Portuguese: Secretário de Estado das Comunidades Portuguesas) is a Portuguese government role under the Ministry of Foreign Affairs, overseeing policies for emigrants and the diaspora. It manages consular services, cultural and economic ties, and citizen support abroad, working with embassies, consulates, and diaspora organisations. The position also oversees the Portuguese Communities Council, a consultative body that represents Portuguese citizens abroad and advises the government on emigration and diaspora affairs.

As of 5 April 2024, the current Secretary of State for Portuguese Communities is José Cesário, having previously held the position in the past.

== Former names ==
- 1976–1978: Secretary of State for Emigration
- 1978–1979: Secretary of State for Foreign Affairs and Emigration
- 1979–1980: Secretary of State for Emigration
- 1980–1983: Secretary of State for Emigration and the Portuguese Communities
- 1983–1985: Secretary of State for Emigration
- 1985–present: Secretary of State for the Portuguese Communities

== Holders ==
- 1976–1978: João Vieira de Lima
- 1978–1979: Paulo Ennes
- 1979–1980: Mário Neves
- 1980–1981: Manuela Aguiar (first time)
- 1981–1983: José Vitoriano
- 1983–1987: Manuela Aguiar (second time)
- 1987–1991: Manuel Correia de Jesus
- 1991–1995: Luís Sousa de Macedo
- 1995–1999: José Lello
- 1999–2002: João Rui Gaspar de Almeida
- 2002–2004: José Cesário (first time)
- 2004–2005: Carlos Gonçalves
- 2005–2011: António Braga
- 2011–2015: José Cesário (second time)
- 2015–2019: José Luís Carneiro
- 2019–2022: Berta Nunes
- 2022–2024: Paulo Cafôfo
- 2024–present: José Cesário (third time)
