= AIEJI – International Association of Social Educators =

AIEJI – International Association of Social Educators is an organisation of individual social educators, their national organisations, related workplaces and educational institutions that work with developing the profession of social educators and the underlying principles of practice.

== History ==
AIEJI was founded in the aftermath of World War II as a collective, international response to the many children and youth left orphaned, homeless or parentless after the war as it was clear that something had to be done to take care of their educational needs. Several meetings were held between representatives from various European countries until, in 1951, Association International des Éducateurs de Jeunes Inadapté (AIEJI), was created.

One of the headmasters behind the creation of AIEJI, was Henri Joubrel, who was also one of the main forces behind ANEJI - Association nationale des éducateurs des jeunes inadapté - the national French organisation for social educators.

Another important character in the history of AIEJI is Serge Ginger, the general secretary of AIEJI for many years (1966–1991), and a clinical psychologist who. during several years 1974–1980) worked as international chief expert for UNESCO, in the field of Special Education and Psychology.

AIEJI has since developed to becoming an international organisation with members from all over the world who work with socially exposed children and youth, persons with developmental disabilities and excluded and marginalised adults such as persons with mental disorders, homeless people and substance abusers.

== Objectives and means ==
The objectives of AIEJI are to:

1. Unite social educators from all countries and promote quality practice that seeks to ensure the best for the people served by the profession.
2. Encourage the richness of diversity by promoting collaboration between people of different backgrounds and cultures through the international membership of AIEJI.
3. Contribute to the development of professional education and training to increase the competence of all social educators.
4. Promote the organization of the profession of social educators and encourage networking among AIEJI members to increase international collaboration.
5. Emphasize professional practice and educational methods based on the United Nations' declarations of human and children's rights as well as the convention on persons with disabilities.

AIEJI will seek to carry out its stated objectives by means of:

1. Encouraging the creation of social educator associations in countries in which there are no such organizations.
2. Organizing international congresses, colloquia, seminars of a general, inter-regional or regional nature.
3. Promoting international exchange of persons, ideas and contribute to the study of protection of persons nationally and internationally and to facilitate contacts for its members with educational experiences carried out around the world.
4. Promoting the development and utilization of knowledge through research, publication, exchange of documentation concerning social education, human welfare, and collaboration on practical and scientific publication in the field.
5. By working together with the United Nations and its specialized institutions as well as with other international or national organizations, whether inter-governmental, governmental or not.
6. Any other means appropriate to the purposes and goals of this international association.

== AIEJI World Congress ==
Every 4th year, AIEJI holds an international congress for all its members and affiliated professionals, scholars, practitioners et al.

The world congress is the main event of the association which constitutes the direction and purpose of the association and where knowledge is produced, gathered and exchanged.

In 2021, the Congress takes place in Lausanne in Switzerland and in 2025 in Copenhagen, Denmark.
