= Instituto Superior de Lisboa e Vale do Tejo =

Coordinates: 41.2008022°N 8.2891822°W

ISCE – Instituto Superior de Lisboa e Vale do Tejo – is a Portuguese private polytechnic higher education institution, located in Odivelas that offers courses in the education area, including child education, cultural animation, gym teacher, primary school teacher, digital and multimedia education and tourism. It was founded in 1984 and was allowed by the Portuguese Ministry of Education to provide higher education in 1988 (decree law: Decreto-Lei nº 415/88). ISCE also has an institute in Penafiel called ISCE Douro.

ISCE is a member of:

- UNESCO Associated Schools Project Network
- Founding member of AEDESP
- AIEJI – International Association of Social Educators
- EUROHDIR
- SOCRATES/ERASMUS partner
- LEONARDO DA VINCI partner

It is associated with Picapau and ICE, schools that offers primary to secondary education.

== See also ==
- list of colleges and universities in Portugal
