= Alfândega da Fé =

- Municipality
- Town of Alfândega da Fé
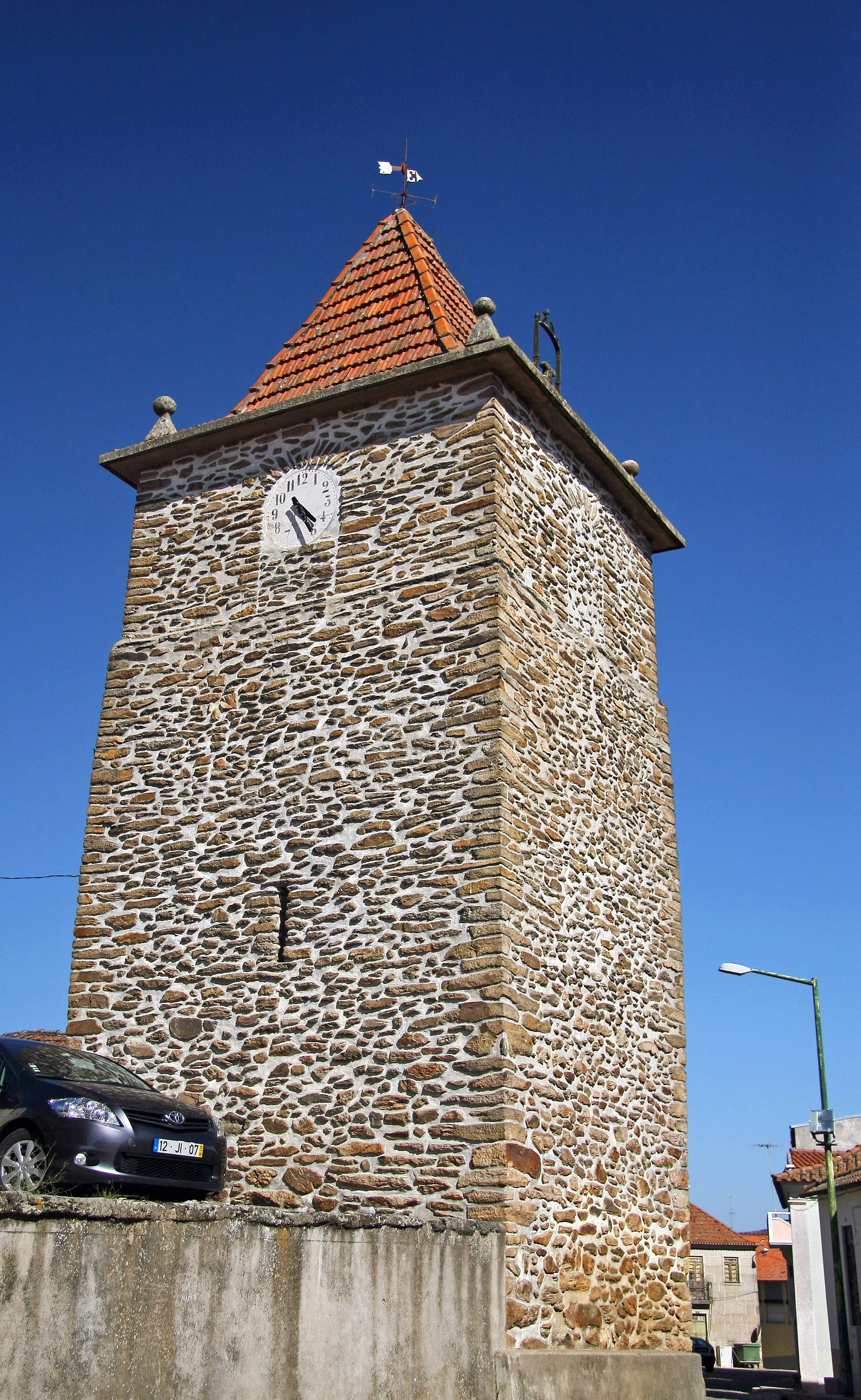
- View of Alfândega da Fé

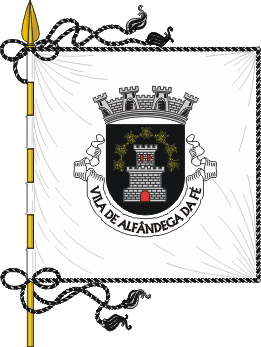
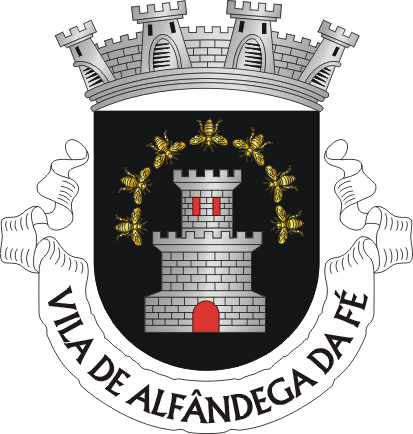
- Flag Coat of arms
- Interactive map of Alfândega da Fé
- Location in Portugal
- Coordinates: 41°21′20″N 6°56′42″W
- Country: Portugal
- Region: Norte
- Intermunic. comm.: Terras de Trás-os-Montes
- District: Bragança
- Parishes: 12

Government
  - President: Berta Ferreira Milheiro Nunes (PS)
- Elevation: 555 m (1,821 ft)

Population (2025)
  - Total: 4,210
- Time zone: UTC+00:00 (WET)
  - Summer (DST): UTC+01:00 (WEST)
- Postal code: 5350
- Patron: São Pedro
- Website: www.cm-alfandegadafe.pt

Alfândega da Fé (European Portuguese pronunciation: [alˈfɐ̃dɨɣɐ ðɐ ˈfɛ]), officially the Town of Alfândega da Fé (Portuguese: Vila de Alfândega da Fé), is a municipality in northeast Portugal. As of 2025, municipality hosted a population of 4,210, in an area of 321.95 square kilometres (124.31 mi^{2}). The town itself had 1,937 inhabitants as of 2021.

== History ==
Early archaeological sites, such as Castro hill fort-settlements, can be found scattered throughout the municipality.

The municipality has an origin that comes from mixed Moorish influences and Christian faith. Alfandagh, the Arabic term for this region, which means hospice, castle or frontier, or literally "a place of calm hospitality populated by peaceful or hard-working peoples". In a published work of João Manuel d’Almeida Moraes Pessanha:

"Alfândega, public hospice, market likely, like the Kahn's Orient...It is a village of Arab foundation, in likely the 8th century; The Arabs maintained their nomadic lifestyle. Charmed by the conquest of Spain, they immediately molded the country according to their use and customs: a soil that many liked, a land that, many said was similar to Syria in its climate and purity of its atmosphere, or Yemen in its fertility, in India its flowers and aromas, Hedjaz in its products, and in Aden in its ports and coasts."

There are historical convictions that Alfândega, during Moorish occupation, was an administrative seat of some importance to a region referred to as Valiato de Aldandica. The conquest by Asturian Christians was to have likely resulted in the expulsion of the Moors, and the extension of its name with Fé (English: faith).

Some suggest that the settlement was the seat of an ancient order that pre-dated the Templars, that was referred to as the Ordem dos Cavaleiros das Esporas Douradas (Portuguese: Order of the Knights of the Golden Spurs). Legend suggests that these Templar Knights were responsible for liberating the lands, known as the Tributo das Donzelas.

The first foral was attributed on 8 May 1294, by King Dinis of Portugal, in a document that first defined the geographic limits of the municipality. On 17 September 1295, the monarch conceded a market charter, similar to one established for Covilhã (a new market charter was later passed by King John of Portugal on 13 January 1410). King Dinis then ordered the re-construction of the Moorish castle (yet, over time, the structure fell into ruins and its remains eventually disappeared). A 1530 census found the structure in ruins. The town's landmarks are considered the remains of the Moorish influences in the town, for example the clock tower Torre do Relógio. Tombo dos Bens do Concelho (1766) makes references to Moorish influences.

In 1385, King John forced the residents of Alfândega da Fé to rebuild the Torre de Moncorvo, probably an effort to gain the community's support of the Kingdom of Castelo during the Interregnum (1383–1385). The king visited Alfândega in order to evaluate the Torre de Moncorvo, while travelling to Bragança.

In 1510, Manuel I of Portugal established a new foral that redefined and expanded the limits of the municipality. The 1530 census noted that the castle was already "derrubado e malbaratado" (in ruins and of little value), and the 1766 assessments of the municipality identified that "the ancient walls" near the Clock Tower were located in a zone identified as "the castle", referring to the medieval castle. Historical records from this period until the 18th century are rare, and it is known that there were few inhabitants during these eras (less than 100 houses by one source). Yet in the second half of the 18th century, the population had grown considerably, in part due to the export of 1.72 tons of silk (by the 19th century).

On 24 October 1855, the municipality was abolished, and its parishes were incorporated into the municipalities of Moncorvo, Vila Flor, Macedo de Cavaleiros and Mogadouro. The municipality was subsequently restored by January 1898.

== Geography ==
=== Physical geography ===
Although there have been changes throughout its history, Alfândega da Fé has always maintained a few geographic landmarks: the Serra de Bornes in the north, the valley of the Sabor River to the south, the Plateau of Castro Vicente in the east, and the valley of Vilariça in the west. Covering an area of approximately 320 square kilometres, the extent is a synthesis of the Trás-os-Montes region which covers Serras, small plateaus, plains, as well as shallow and deep valleys. The flora is a mixture of natural and introduced species ranging from chestnut, cork, oak, olive, almond, cherry, orange trees, vineyards to intensely cultivated cereal species (namely rye, which is still cultivated in the area, on lands ~1000 meters above sea level).

=== Climate ===
The region has a climate that varies between extremes: in the winter, the mountains are covered in snow and temperatures are cold; in the spring, the region is covered by wild flowering plants of enormous diversity with almond, cherry and apple orchards covered in blooms; in the summer, the dry heat is responsible for an arid environment; and in the fall, the temperate climate transforms the green of tree leaves into several hues.

=== Demography ===
Population of Alfândega da Fé (1801 - 2025)
Year	Pop.	±%
1801	4,737	—
1849	5,736	+21.1%
1900	9,069	+58.1%
1930	8,789	−3.1%
1960	9,672	+10.0%
1981	7,925	−18.1%
1991	6,734	−15.0%
2001	5,963	−11.4%
2011	5,104	−14.4%
2021	4,324	−15.3%
2025	4,210	−2.6%
Source: INE

The population declined through the late 20th century. Much like other regions of the interior, there is a pull of emigrants towards more urbanized centres in the south, and slow human depopulatation in areas such as Alfândega da Fé. The slow aging of the population and the difficulty in attracting a young resident base has depopulated many of the parishes.

The municipality retains its 1898 limits, from the Serra de Bornes to the Sabor River, and from the plateau of Castro Vicente to the Vale da Vilariça. Administratively, the municipality is divided into 12 civil parishes (freguesias):

- Agrobom, Saldonha e Vale Pereiro
- Alfândega da Fé
- Cerejais
- Eucisia, Gouveia e Valverde
- Ferradosa e Sendim da Serra
- Gebelim e Soeima
- Parada e Sendim da Ribeira
- Pombal e Vales
- Sambade
- Vilar Chão
- Vilarelhos
- Vilares de Vilariça

== Services ==
Electricity, indoor plumbing, basic sanitation and asphalted roads are present and available throughout the municipality, and it is one of the first municipalities to close its public dump. Although the community is not free from problems, it does have many services that are uncommon in the region, primarily due to its distance from the district capital. Its Centros de Saúde (health centres), along with private initiatives, have made it one of the more dynamic municipalities in the country, providing local service without unnecessary trips to distant hospitals. The local Bombeiros Voluntários (volunteer fire brigade) has been active in this role, responsible for both protection from civil and forest fires and transporting the sick and injured. The Lar da Terceira Idade da Santa Casa da Misericórdia, the Santuário de Cerejais (Mariano) and other smaller institutions in the parishes provide local assistance to seniors, in addition to home-care. The largest schools, both primary and secondary level, are located within the city of Alfândega da Fé. While the establishment of a municipal library and Casa da Cultura have assisted education within these communities, the area has also experienced a decrease in local enrollment, resulting in the closure of several smaller schools. Sports facilities, such as the Pavilhões Desportivos (sports pavilions) and Piscinas (pools), improved community activity, as well as providing a source of water instruction (in this landlocked region).

== Economy ==
With about 7000 residents, the municipality still finds agriculture its main economic stimulus. Although growth has been difficult (due to changes caused by market competition, the introduction of industrialization and lack of a national agriculture policy), most of its citizens still identify themselves as farmers. The lack of a serious quality certification for local biological products, such as olive oil, almonds, chestnuts, fruits, cheeses, local smoked meats/sausages, sweets, compotes and traditional liqueurs, has generally been a complaint of local farmers trying to expand their businesses.

A number of handicrafts from the traditional culture of the region are locally produced: embroidery and quilt-making, basket-weaving, metal-smithing, shoe-making and sewing, which had been abandoned in the modernization of Portugal. One of these, the creation of fine cloths from silkworms, was common in the region. These traditions have been slowly explored for their economic and tourist-friendly benefits. This reemergence of traditional handicrafts has, over the past decades, added to the tertiary sector of the economy, along with the expansion of commerce, hotels and small industries associated with tourism. The construction of a new municipal market has improved local commerce, in addition to the expansion of the medieval fair which has been a lure for tourists, the Recinto da Feira and Feira da Cereja.

Industrial activities are concentrated in an industrial zone within the main city of Alfândega. Agriculture, the base of the economy, still requires many improvements, including the expansion of dams in order to cover larger areas (another two projects have been planned). Tourism, although gaining importance recently in the region, has been aided by the construction of a modern hotel in the Serra de Bornes (Estalagem Senhora das Neves), new restaurants and the expansion of hunting lodges (for clubs, associations and huntsmen). The opening of the Parque de Usos Múltiplos (Multi-Use Park) offers locals and visitors a variety of nature activities (e.g. camping).
