= XXIII Constitutional Government of Portugal =

Government of Portugal between 2022 and 2024, led by António Costa

XXIII Constitutional Government of Portugal XXIII Governo Constitucional de Portugal
- Cabinet of Portugal

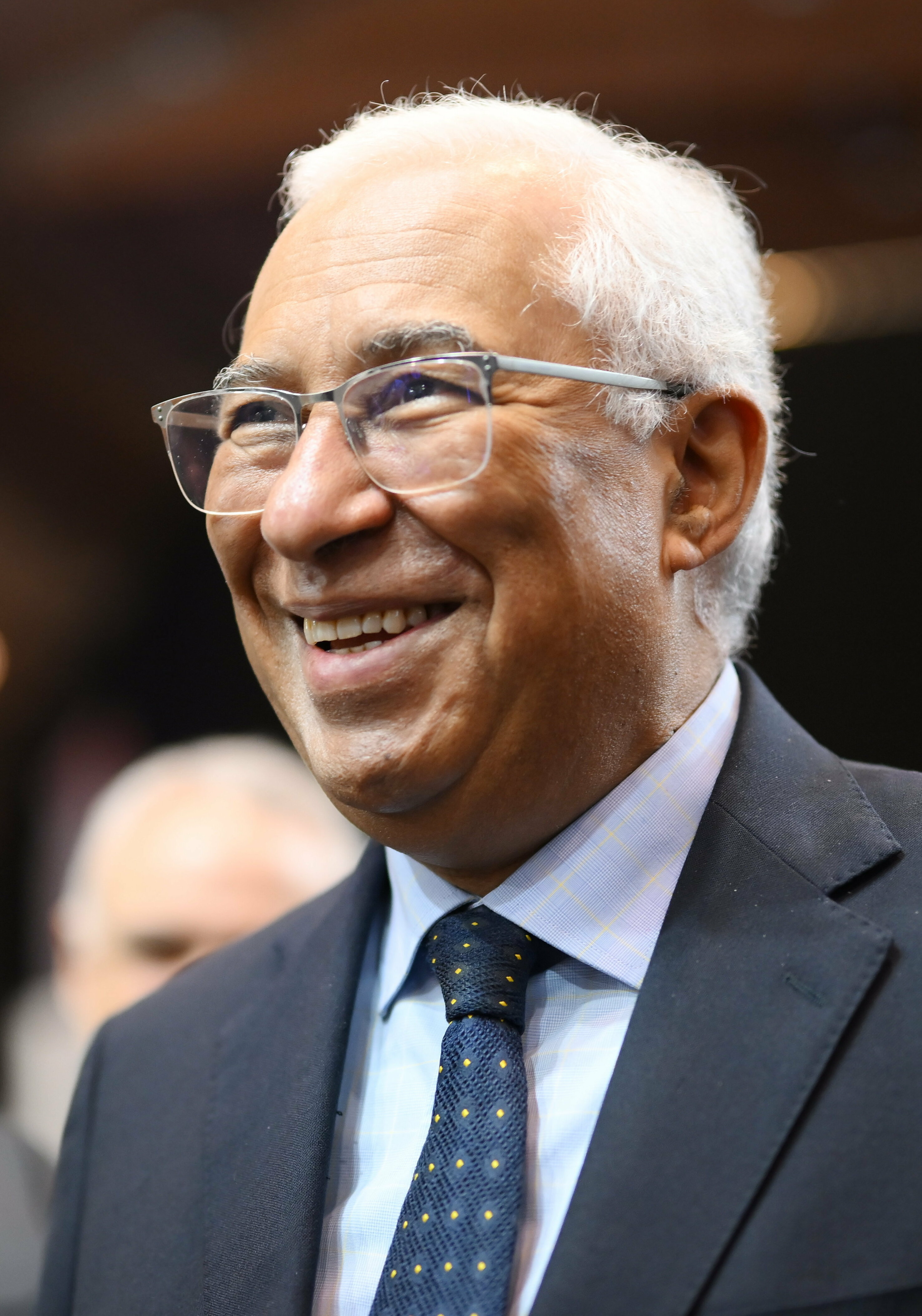
- Prime Minister António Costa
- Date formed: 30 March 2022
- Date dissolved: 2 April 2024

People and organisations
- President of the Republic: Marcelo Rebelo de Sousa
- Prime Minister: António Costa
- No. of ministers: 17 (Note: Not including the Prime Minister.)
- Ministers removed: 3 resigned (Note: Not including the resignation of the Prime Minister.)
- Member party: Socialist Party (PS)
- Status in legislature: Majority
- Opposition parties: Social Democratic Party (PSD); Chega (CH); Liberal Initiative (IL); Portuguese Communist Party (PCP); Left Bloc (BE); People–Animals–Nature (PAN); LIVRE (L)

History
- Elections: 2022 Portuguese legislative election (30 January 2022)
- Legislature term: 15th Legislature
- Predecessor: XXII Constitutional Government
- Successor: XXIV Constitutional Government

The XXIII Constitutional Government of Portugal (Portuguese: XXIII Governo Constitucional de Portugal) was the 23rd government of the Third Portuguese Republic under the current Constitution, and had António Costa as the Prime Minister, in his third consecutive term. It was in office from 30 March 2022 to 2 April 2024 and was formed by members of the Socialist Party (PS).

It was the second PS government to have absolute majority of seats in the Legislature, after the first government of José Sócrates, between 2005 and 2009. It was composed of 17 ministers and 40 secretaries of state

== Party breakdown ==
Party breakdown of cabinet ministers by the end of the government's time in office: (Prime Minister not included)

- Socialist Party
- Independents
10
7

== Composition ==
The government was initially composed of the Prime Minister and 17 ministries comprising ministers, secretaries, and sub-secretaries of state. On 3 January 2023, the Ministry of Infrastructure and Housing was split into the Ministry of Infrastructure and the Ministry of Housing, increasing the number of ministries to 18.

Office	Minister	Party	Start of term	End of term
Prime Minister	António Costa	PS	30 March 2022	2 April 2024
Minister of the Presidency	Mariana Vieira da Silva	PS	30 March 2022	2 April 2024
Minister of Foreign Affairs	João Gomes Cravinho	Independent	30 March 2022	2 April 2024
Minister of National Defence	Helena Carreiras	Independent	30 March 2022	2 April 2024
Minister of Home Affairs	José Luís Carneiro	PS	30 March 2022	2 April 2024
Minister of Justice	Catarina Sarmento e Castro	Independent	30 March 2022	2 April 2024
Minister of Finance	Fernando Medina	PS	30 March 2022	2 April 2024
Minister in the Cabinet of the Prime Minister and for Parliamentary Affairs	Ana Catarina Mendes	PS	30 March 2022	2 April 2024
Minister of the Economy and Maritime Affairs	António Costa Silva	Independent	30 March 2022	2 April 2024
Minister of Culture	Pedro Adão e Silva	Independent	30 March 2022	2 April 2024
Minister of Science, Technology and Higher Education	Elvira Fortunato	Independent	30 March 2022	2 April 2024
Minister of Education	João Costa	PS	30 March 2022	2 April 2024
Minister of Labour, Solidarity and Social Security	Ana Mendes Godinho	PS	30 March 2022	2 April 2024
Minister of Health	Marta Temido	PS	30 March 2022	10 September 2022
Minister of Health	Manuel Pizarro	PS	10 September 2022	2 April 2024
Minister of Environment and Climate Action	Duarte Cordeiro	PS	30 March 2022	2 April 2024
Minister of Infrastructure and Housing (Note: Position replaced by the Minister of Infrastructure and the Minister of Housing on 4 January 2023.)	Pedro Nuno Santos	PS	30 March 2022	4 January 2023
Minister of Infrastructure (Note: Position created on 4 January 2023.)	João Galamba	PS	4 January 2023	13 November 2023
Minister of Infrastructure	Prime Minister António Costa served as interim minister between 15 November 2023 and 2 April 2024.			
Minister of Housing	Marina Gonçalves	PS	4 January 2023	2 April 2024
Minister of Territorial Cohesion	Ana Abrunhosa	Independent	30 March 2022	2 April 2024
Minister of Agriculture and Food	Maria do Céu Antunes	PS	30 March 2022	2 April 2024

== Events ==
=== Resignation of António Costa ===
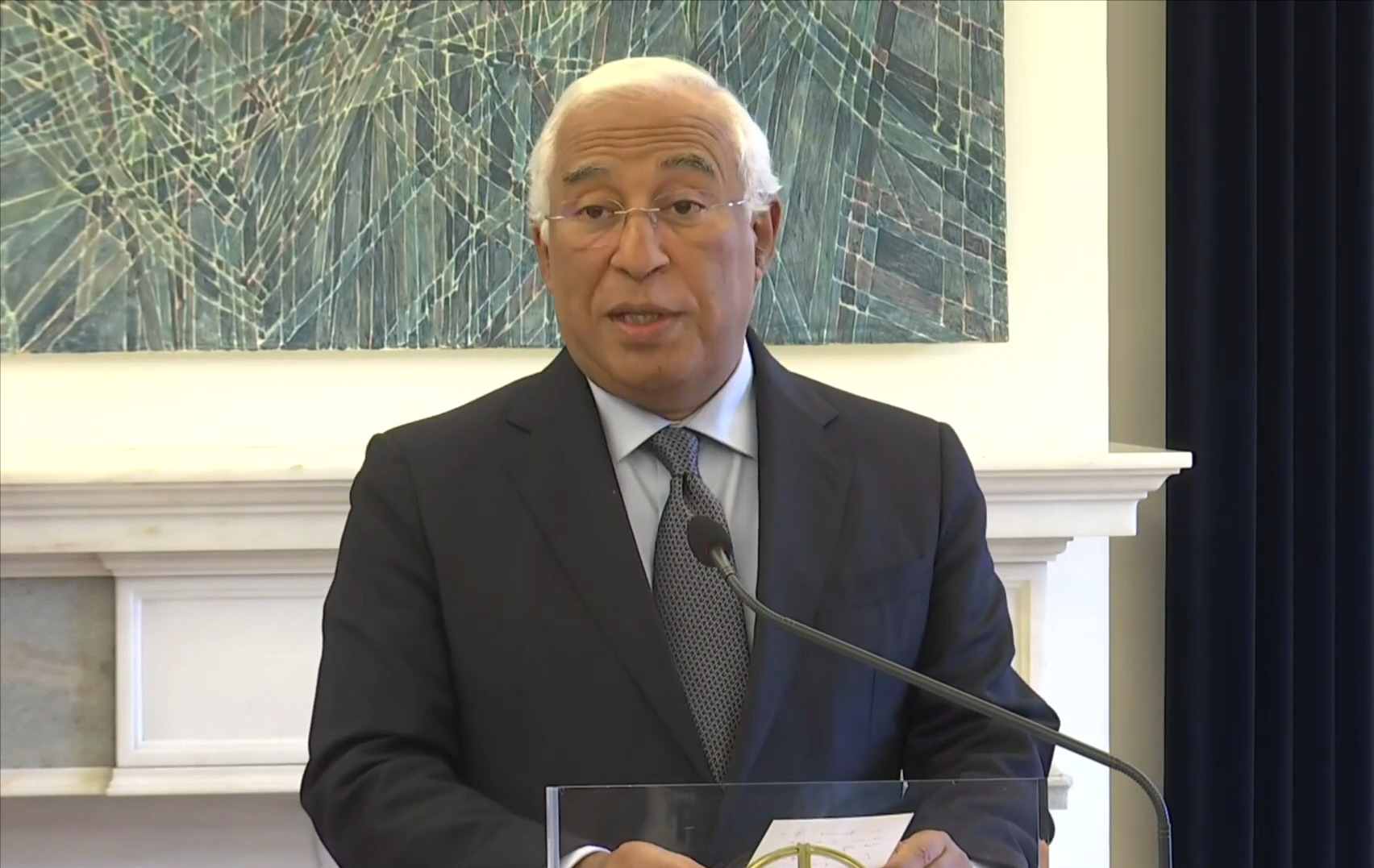
Costa announcing his resignation, on 7 November 2023

On 7 November 2023, Portuguese prosecutors detained António Costa's chief of staff Vítor Escária and named the minister of Infrastructure João Galamba a formal suspect in an investigation into alleged corruption in lithium mining, green hydrogen and a data centre deals. Over 40 searches were carried out in several buildings, including Escária's office, the Ministry of Infrastructure and the Ministry of the Environment and Climate Action.

Costa met with the President of Portugal Marcelo Rebelo de Sousa and announced his resignation in a televised statement in the afternoon, saying that "the dignity of the functions of prime minister is not compatible with any suspicion about his integrity, his good conduct and even less with the suspicion of the practice of any criminal act".

On 9 November 2023, after meeting with the Council of State and talking with the political parties represented in the parliament, president Rebelo de Sousa announced snap legislative elections to be held on 10 March 2024. Because the 2024 government budget debate was still underway in the parliament and, by law, elections need to be held within 60 days of the dissolution of the parliament, president Rebelo de Sousa officially dissolved the parliament more than two months later, on 15 January 2024. On 2 April 2024, the new center-right minority government, led by Prime Minister Luís Montenegro, took office to succeed António Costa, resulting from the slim victory of the Democratic Alliance in the snap election.
