= XXII Constitutional Government of Portugal =

Cabinet of Portugal between 2019 and 2022, led by António Costa

XXII Constitutional Government of Portugal XXII Governo Constitucional de Portugal
- Cabinet of Portugal

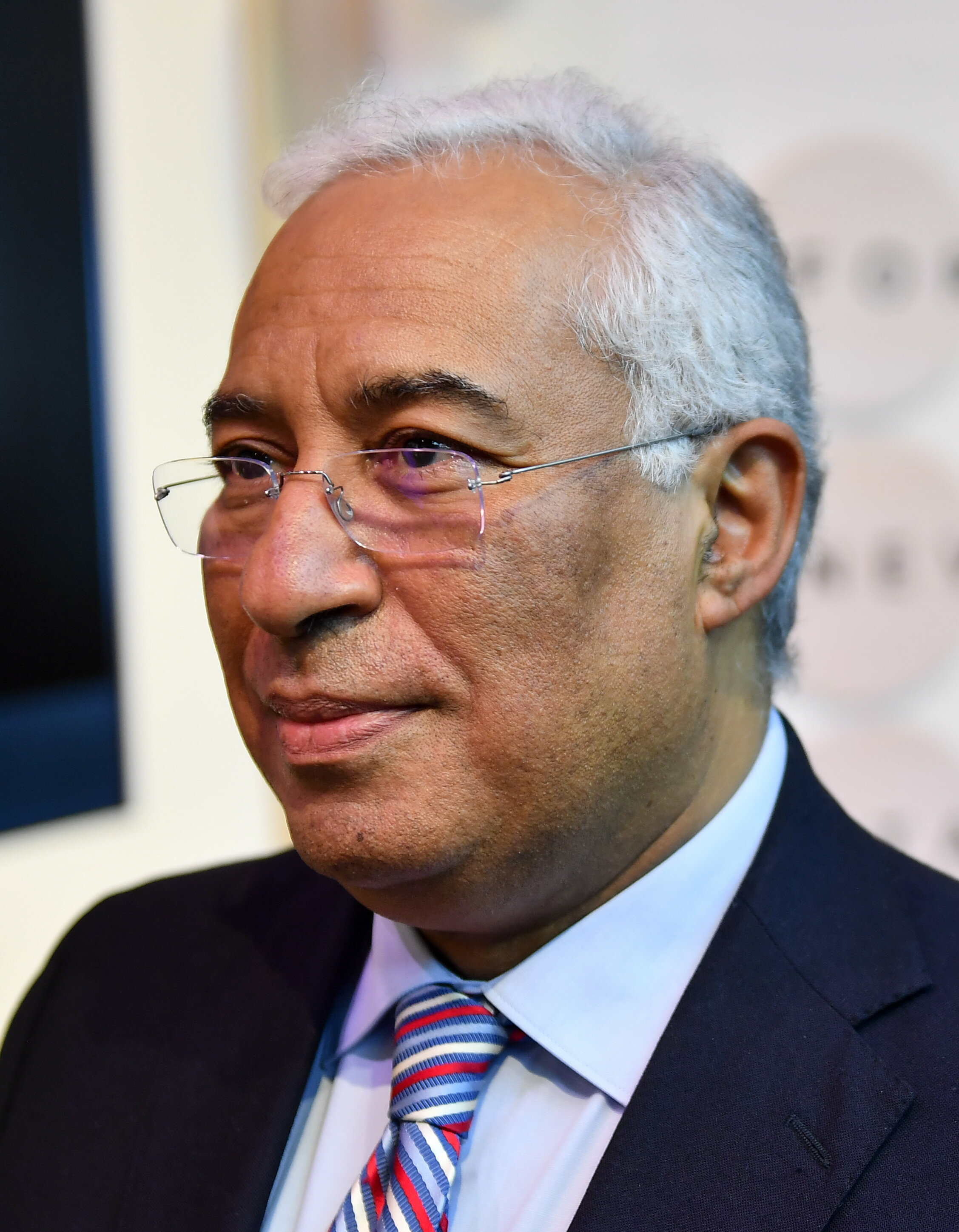
- Prime Minister António Costa
- Date formed: 26 October 2019
- Date dissolved: 30 March 2022 (2 years, 5 months and 4 days)

People and organisations
- President of the Republic: Marcelo Rebelo de Sousa
- Prime Minister: António Costa
- No. of ministers: 19 (Note: Not including the Prime Minister.)
- Member party: Socialist Party (PS)
- Status in legislature: Minority
- Opposition parties: Social Democratic Party (PSD); Left Bloc (BE); Portuguese Communist Party (PCP); CDS – People's Party (CDS–PP); People–Animals–Nature (PAN); Ecologist Party "The Greens" (PEV); Chega (CH); Liberal Initiative (IL); LIVRE (L)

History
- Elections: 2019 Portuguese legislative election (6 October 2019)
- Legislature term: 14th Legislature
- Predecessor: XXI Constitutional Government
- Successor: XXIII Constitutional Government

The XXII Constitutional Government of Portugal (Portuguese: XXII Governo Constitucional de Portugal) was the 22nd government of the Third Portuguese Republic, under the current Constitution. It was established on 26 October 2019 as a Socialist Party (PS) minority government, led by Prime Minister António Costa, and ended on 30 March 2022.

== Party breakdown ==
Party breakdown of cabinet ministers by the end of the government's time in office: (Prime Minister not included)

- Socialist Party
- Independents
10
9

== Composition ==
The government was composed of the Prime Minister and 19 ministries comprising ministers, secretaries and under-secretaries of state.

Ministry	Name	Party	Start of term	End of term
Prime Minister	António Costa	PS	26 October 2019	30 March 2022
Minister of State for the Economy and the Digital Transition	Pedro Siza Vieira	PS	26 October 2019	30 March 2022
Minister of State and Foreign Affairs	Augusto Santos Silva	PS	26 October 2019	28 March 2022
Minister of State and Foreign Affairs	Prime Minister António Costa served as interim minister between 28 and 30 March 2022.			
Minister of State for the Presidency	Mariana Vieira da Silva	PS	26 October 2019	30 March 2022
Minister of State for Finance	Mário Centeno	Independent	26 October 2019	15 June 2020
Minister of State for Finance	João Leão	Independent	15 June 2020	30 March 2022
Minister of National Defence	João Gomes Cravinho	Independent	26 October 2019	30 March 2022
Minister of Internal Administration	Eduardo Cabrita	PS	26 October 2019	4 December 2021
Minister of Internal Administration	Minister of Justice Francisca Van Dunem served as interim minister between 4 December 2021 and 30 March 2022.			
Minister of Justice	Francisca Van Dunem	Independent	26 October 2019	30 March 2022
Minister for Modernization of the State and Public Administration	Alexandra Leitão	PS	26 October 2019	30 March 2022
Minister for Planning	Nelson de Souza	PS	26 October 2019	30 March 2022
Minister of Culture	Graça Fonseca	PS	26 October 2019	30 March 2022
Minister for Science, Technology and Higher Education	Manuel Heitor	Independent	26 October 2019	30 March 2022
Minister of Education	Tiago Brandão Rodrigues	Independent	26 October 2019	30 March 2022
Minister of Labour, Solidarity and Social Security	Ana Mendes Godinho	PS	26 October 2019	30 March 2022
Minister for Health	Marta Temido	Independent	26 October 2019	30 March 2022
Minister for the Environment and Climate Action	João Pedro Matos Fernandes	Independent	26 October 2019	30 March 2022
Minister for Infrastructure and Housing	Pedro Nuno Santos	PS	26 October 2019	30 March 2022
Minister for Territorial Cohesion	Ana Abrunhosa	Independent	26 October 2019	30 March 2022
Minister of Agriculture	Maria do Céu Antunes	PS	26 October 2019	30 March 2022
Minister of Maritime Affairs	Ricardo Serrão Santos	PS	26 October 2019	30 March 2022
