= XXIV Constitutional Government of Portugal =

Government of Portugal between 2024 and 2025, led by Luís Montenegro

24th Constitutional Government of Portugal XXIV Governo Constitucional de Portugal
- Cabinet of Portugal

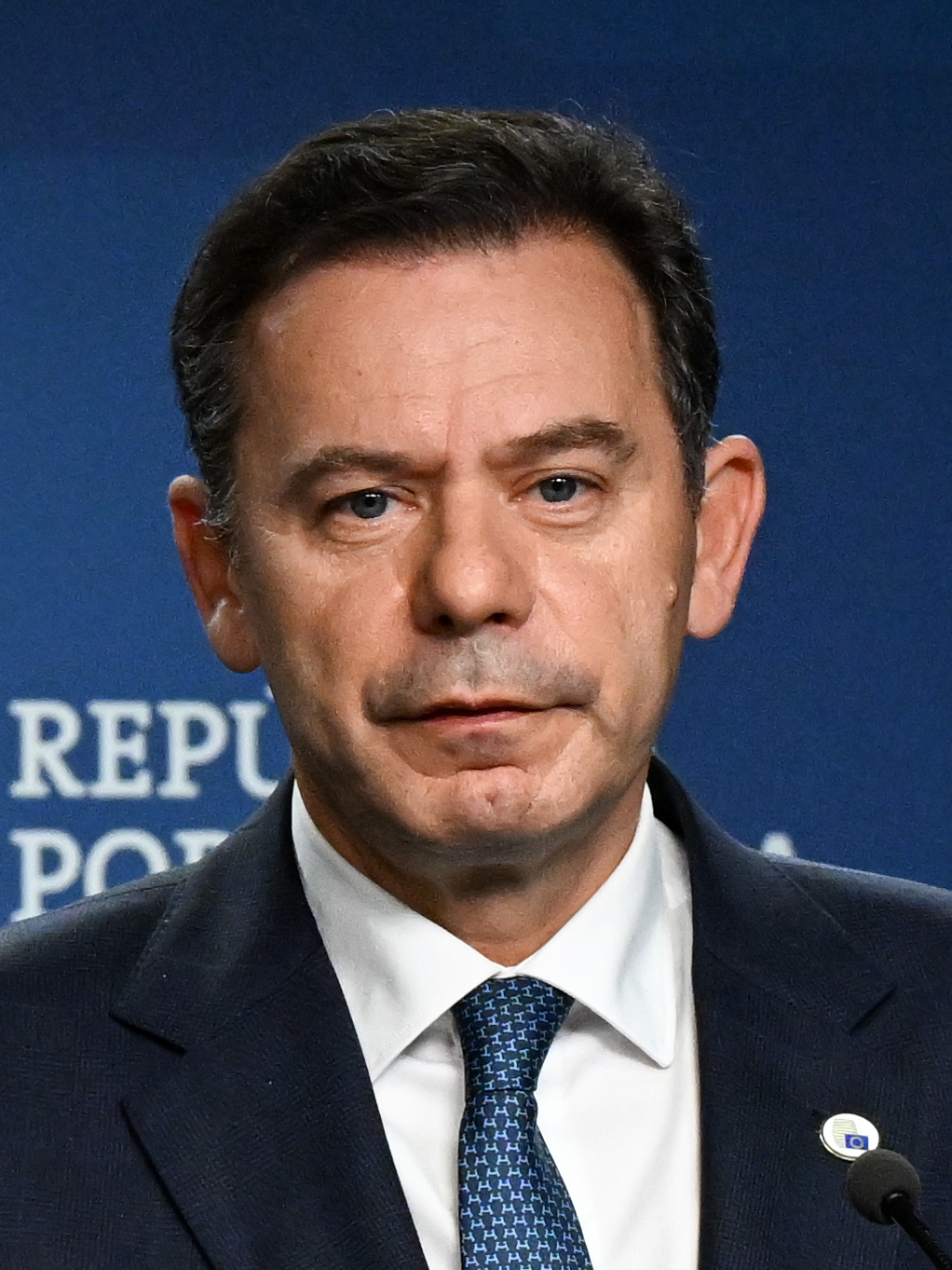
- Prime Minister Luís Montenegro
- Date formed: 2 April 2024
- Date dissolved: 5 June 2025

People and organisations
- President: Marcelo Rebelo de Sousa
- Prime Minister: Luís Montenegro
- No. of ministers: 17 (Note: Not including the Prime Minister.)
- Member parties: Social Democratic Party (PSD); CDS – People's Party (CDS–PP)
- Status in legislature: Minority coalition government
- Opposition parties: Socialist Party (PS); Chega (CH); Liberal Initiative (IL); Left Bloc (BE); Portuguese Communist Party (PCP); LIVRE (L); People Animals Nature (PAN)
- Opposition leader: Pedro Nuno Santos

History
- Election: 2024 Portuguese legislative election
- Legislature term: 16th Legislature
- Predecessor: 23rd Constitutional Government
- Successor: 25th Constitutional Government

The 24th Constitutional Government of Portugal (Portuguese: XXIV Governo Constitucional de Portugal) was the 24th cabinet of the Portuguese government, led by Prime Minister Luís Montenegro. It was sworn in on 2 April 2024 and it was formed by a centre-right coalition between the Social Democratic Party (PSD) and the CDS – People's Party (CDS–PP), which ran together in the 2024 legislative election as part of the Democratic Alliance (AD).

== Party breakdown ==
Party breakdown of cabinet ministers by the end of the government's time in office: (Prime Minister not included)

- Social Democratic Party
11
- CDS – People's Party
1
- Independents
5

== Composition ==
The government was composed of 17 ministries, including ministers and secretaries of state.

Office	Minister	Party	Start of term	End of term
Prime Minister	Luís Montenegro	PSD	2 April 2024	5 June 2025
Minister of State and of Foreign Affairs	Paulo Rangel	PSD	2 April 2024	5 June 2025
Minister of State and of Finance	Joaquim Miranda Sarmento	PSD	2 April 2024	5 June 2025
Minister of the Presidency	António Leitão Amaro	PSD	2 April 2024	5 June 2025
Minister Adjunct and for Territorial Cohesion	Manuel Castro Almeida	PSD	2 April 2024	5 June 2025
Minister of Parliamentary Affairs	Pedro Duarte	PSD	2 April 2024	5 June 2025
Minister of National Defence	Nuno Melo	CDS-PP	2 April 2024	5 June 2025
Minister of Justice	Rita Júdice	Independent	2 April 2024	5 June 2025
Minister of Internal Administration	Margarida Blasco	Independent	2 April 2024	5 June 2025
Minister of Education, Science and Innovation	Fernando Alexandre	Independent	2 April 2024	5 June 2025
Minister of Health	Ana Paula Martins	PSD	2 April 2024	5 June 2025
Minister of Infrastructure and Housing	Miguel Pinto Luz	PSD	2 April 2024	5 June 2025
Minister of Economy	Pedro Reis	PSD	2 April 2024	5 June 2025
Minister of Labour, Solidarity and Social Security	Maria do Rosário Palma Ramalho	Independent	2 April 2024	5 June 2025
Minister of the Environment and Energy	Graça Carvalho	PSD	2 April 2024	5 June 2025
Minister of Youth and Modernisation	Margarida Balseiro Lopes	PSD	2 April 2024	5 June 2025
Minister of Agriculture and Fisheries	José Manuel Fernandes	PSD	2 April 2024	5 June 2025
Minister of Culture	Dalila Rodrigues	Independent	2 April 2024	5 June 2025
