= XXI Constitutional Government of Portugal =

Cabinet of Portugal between 2015 and 2019, led by António Costa

XXI Constitutional Government of Portugal XXI Governo Constitucional de Portugal
- Cabinet of Portugal

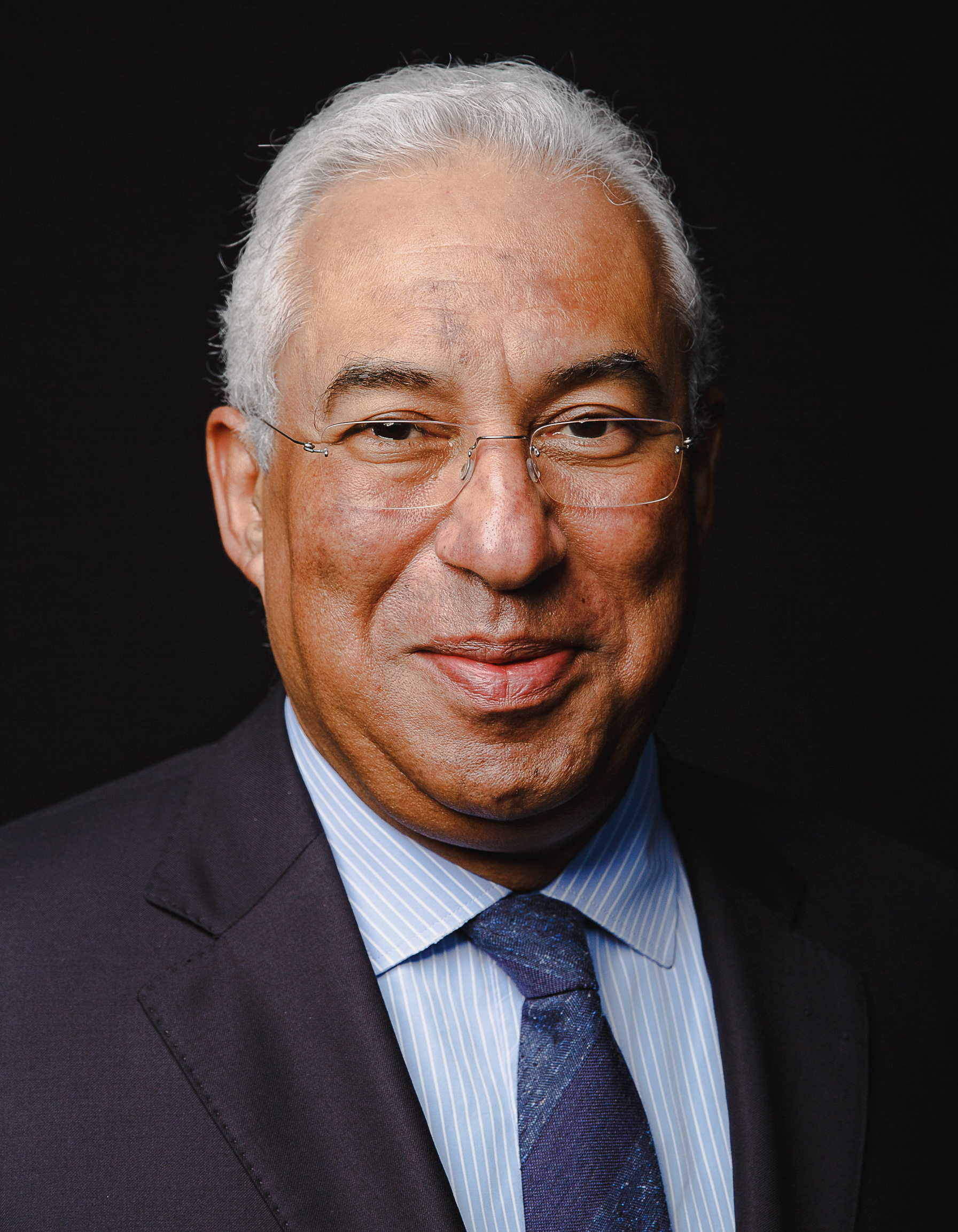
- Prime Minister António Costa
- Date formed: 26 November 2015
- Date dissolved: 26 October 2019 (3 years and 11 months)

People and organisations
- President of the Republic: Aníbal Cavaco Silva; Marcelo Rebelo de Sousa
- Prime Minister: António Costa
- No. of ministers: 17 (Note: Not including the Prime Minister.)
- Member party: Socialist Party (PS)
- Status in legislature: Minority with confidence and supply from: Left Bloc (BE), Portuguese Communist Party (PCP), Ecologist Party "The Greens" (PEV)
- Opposition parties: Social Democratic Party (PPD/PSD); CDS – People's Party (CDS–PP); People–Animals–Nature (PAN)

History
- Elections: 2015 Portuguese legislative election (4 October 2015)
- Predecessor: XX Constitutional Government
- Successor: XXII Constitutional Government

The XXI Constitutional Government of Portugal (Portuguese: XXI Governo Constitucional de Portugal) was the 21st government of the Third Portuguese Republic, under the current Constitution. It was in office from 26 November 2015 to 26 October 2019, and was formed by the members of the Socialist Party (PS). António Costa, leader of the PS, served as Prime Minister.

== Background ==
After the 2015 legislative election had resulted in a hung parliament, the leader of the Portugal Ahead alliance (PPD/PSD.CDS–PP), then Prime Minister Pedro Passos Coelho was given the task of forming a new government. However, as his minority government failed to secure support by any other party, notably the Socialist, the Government Programme was rejected by a vote of 123 to 107 deputies, leading to the government's disbandment within less than a month.

In the meantime, Socialist Party secretary-general António Costa had succeeded in securing support for a Socialist minority government by the Left Bloc (BE), the Portuguese Communist Party (PCP) and the Ecologist Party "The Greens" (PEV), in a confidence and supply agreement. Subsequently, he was appointed as the new Prime Minister on 24 November 2015. The cabinet members took their oath of office on 26 November 2015.

== Party breakdown ==
Party breakdown of cabinet ministers by the end of the government's time in office: (Prime Minister not included)

- Socialist Party
- Independents
11
8

== Composition ==
The government was composed of the Prime Minister and 17 ministries comprising ministers, secretaries and under-secretaries of state.

Office	Minister	Party	Start of term	End of term
Prime Minister	António Costa	PS	26 November 2015	26 October 2019
Minister of Foreign Affairs	Augusto Santos Silva	PS	26 November 2015	26 October 2019
Minister of Premiership and Administrative Modernization	Maria Manuel Leitão Marques	PS	26 November 2015	18 February 2019
Minister of Premiership and Administrative Modernization	Mariana Vieira da Silva	PS	18 February 2019	26 October 2019
Minister of Finance	Mário Centeno	Independent	26 November 2015	26 October 2019
Minister of National Defence	José Alberto Azeredo Lopes	Independent	26 November 2015	12 October 2018
Minister of National Defence	João Gomes Cravinho	Independent	12 October 2018	26 October 2019
Minister of Internal Administration	Constança Urbano de Sousa	Independent	26 November 2015	18 October 2017
Minister of Internal Administration	Eduardo Cabrita	PS	21 October 2017	26 October 2019
Minister of Justice	Francisca Van Dunem	Independent	26 November 2015	26 October 2019
Minister of Economy (Note: Replaced by the position of Deputy Minister and of Economy on 15 October 2018.)	Manuel Caldeira Cabral	Independent	26 November 2015	15 October 2018
Assistant Minister to the Prime Minister (Ministro-Adjunto do Primeiro-Ministro)	Eduardo Cabrita	PS	26 November 2015	21 October 2017
Assistant Minister to the Prime Minister (Ministro-Adjunto do Primeiro-Ministro)	Pedro Siza Vieira	PS	21 October 2017	15 October 2018
Assistant Minister to the Prime Minister and of Economy (Note: Position created on 15 October 2018.)	Pedro Siza Vieira	PS	15 October 2018	26 October 2019
Minister of Culture	João Soares	PS	26 November 2015	8 April 2016
Minister of Culture	Luís Filipe Castro Mendes	Independent	14 April 2016	15 October 2018
Minister of Culture	Graça Fonseca	PS	15 October 2018	26 October 2019
MInister of Science, Technology and Higher Education	Manuel Heitor	Independent	26 November 2015	26 October 2019
Minister of Education	Tiago Brandão Rodrigues	Independent	26 November 2015	26 October 2019
Minister of Labour, Solidarity and Social Security	José Vieira da Silva	PS	26 November 2015	26 October 2019
Minister of Health	Adalberto Campos Fernandes	Independent	26 November 2015	15 October 2018
Minister of Health	Marta Temido	Independent	15 October 2018	26 October 2019
Minister of Planning and Infrastructure (Note: Replaced by the positions of Minister of Planning and Minister of Infrastructure and Housing on 18 February 2019.)	Pedro Marques	PS	26 November 2015	18 February 2019
Minister of Planning (Note: Position created on 18 February 2019.)	Nelson de Souza	PS	18 February 2019	26 October 2019
Minister of Infrastructure and Housing	Pedro Nuno Santos	PS	18 February 2019	26 October 2019
Minister of Environment (Note: Replaced by the position of Minister of Environment and Energy Transition on 15 October 2018.)	João Pedro Matos Fernandes	Independent	26 November 2015	15 October 2018
Minister of Environment and Energy Transition	João Pedro Matos Fernandes	Independent	15 October 2018	26 October 2019
Minister of Agriculture	Luís Capoulas Santos	PS	26 November 2015	26 October 2019
Minister of Sea	Ana Paula Vitorino	PS	26 November 2015	26 October 2019
