= Maria do Céu Antunes =

Portuguese politician (born 1970)

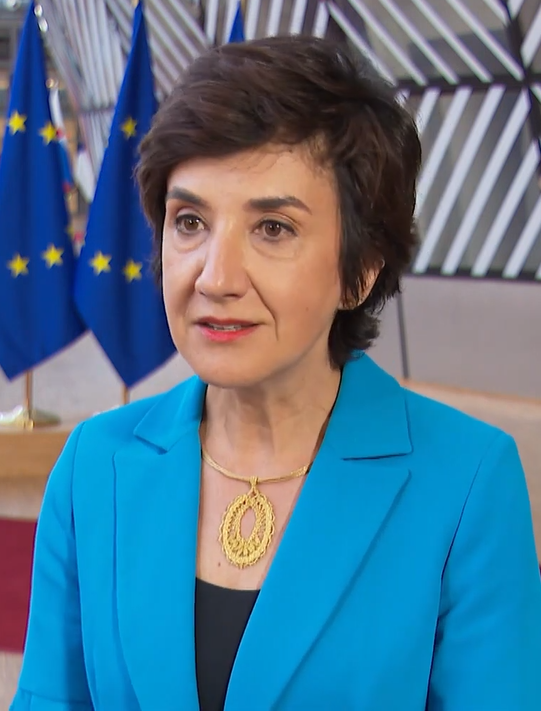
- Antunes in 2023

Minister of Agriculture and Food
- In office 26 October 2019 – 2 April 2024
- Prime Minister: António Costa
- Preceded by: Luís Capoulas Santos
- Succeeded by: José Manuel Fernandes

Secretary of State for Regional Development
- In office 18 February 2019 – 26 October 2019
- Prime Minister: António Costa
- Preceded by: Position established
- Succeeded by: Carlos Miguel

Mayor of Abrantes
- In office 11 October 2009 – 17 February 2019
- Preceded by: Nelson de Carvalho
- Succeeded by: Manuel Jorge Valamatos

Personal details
- Born: Maria do Céu de Oliveira Antunes; July 10, 1970 (age 56) Abrantes, Portugal
- Party: Socialist Party
- Children: 2
- Education: University of Coimbra

Maria do Céu de Oliveira Antunes (born 10 July 1970), previously known as Maria do Céu Albuquerque, is a Portuguese politician who served as the Minister of Agriculture from 2019 to 2024.

She has a degree in biochemistry from the Faculty of Sciences and Technologies of the University of Coimbra and has a postgraduate degree in Quality Management and Food Safety from the Instituto Superior de Ciências da Saúde Egas Moniz. In January 2022, she was elected to the Assembly of the Republic on the list of the victorious Socialist Party (PS), as a representative of Santarém, and was reappointed as Minister of Agriculture and Food.

Before that, she had been Secretary of State for Regional Development in the XXI Constitutional Government of February 18 to October 26, 2019, and President of the Municipality of Abrantes for 9 years.

== Controversies ==
=== Jorge Ferreira Dias case ===
During her 9-year term as Mayor of Abrantes, Maria do Céu Albuquerque got involved in controversies with construction entrepreneur Jorge Ferreira Dias, over land disputes. This case became more visible through the reporting of Ana Leal on TVI.

== Personal life ==
Antunes was married and has 2 daughters. During her marriage she adopted her husband's surname, Albuquerque. After divorcing in 2020, she returned to using her maiden name.
