= António Costa Silva =

Portuguese businessman (born 1952)

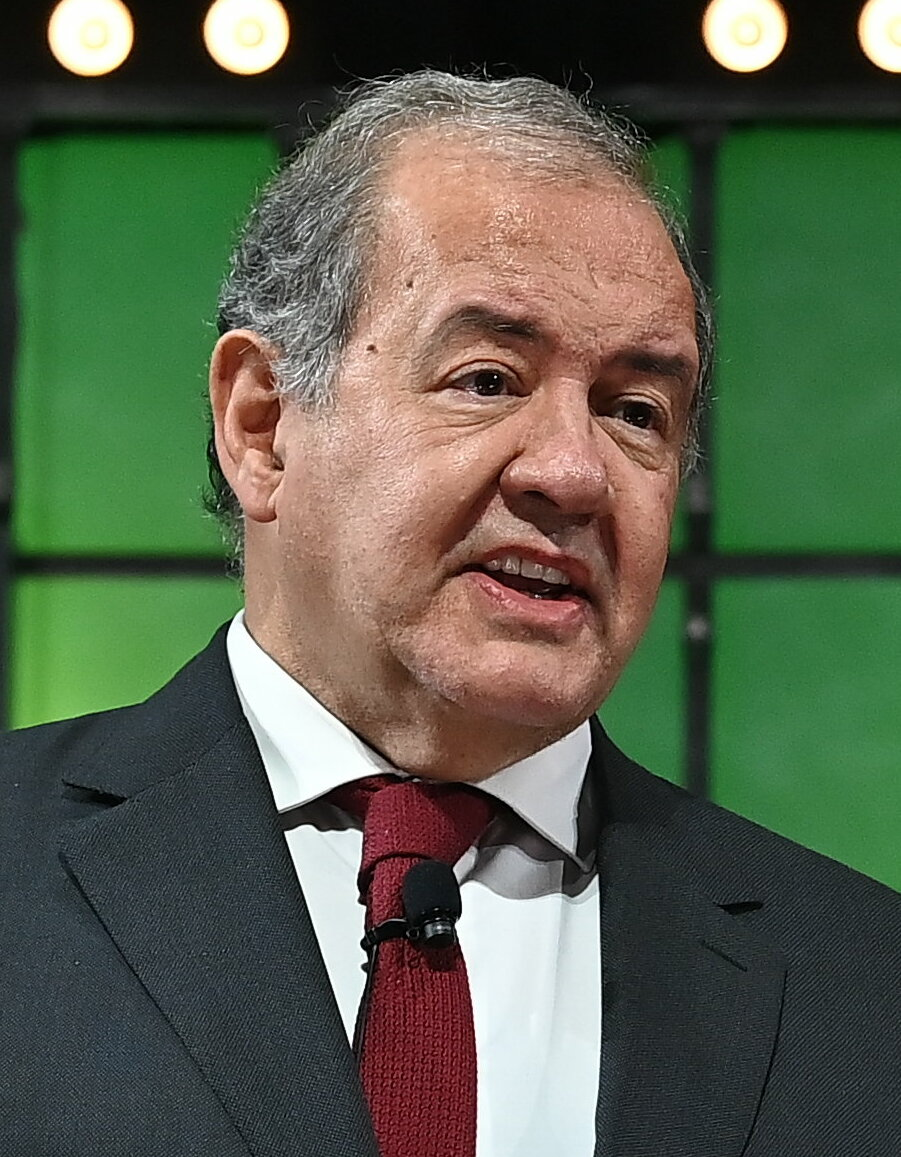
- Costa Silva in 2022

Minister of Economy and Maritime Affairs
- In office 30 March 2022 – 2 April 2024
- Prime Minister: António Costa
- Preceded by: Pedro Siza Vieira (Economy); Ricardo Serrão Santos (Maritime Affairs)
- Succeeded by: Pedro Reis (Minister of Economy); José Manuel Fernandes (Minister of Agriculture and Fisheries)

Personal details
- Born: António José da Costa Silva; 23 November 1952 (age 73) Nova Sintra, Portuguese Angola
- Party: Independent
- Education: Technical University of Lisbon; Imperial College

António José da Costa Silva (European Portuguese pronunciation: [ɐ̃ˈtɔni.u ˈkɔʃtɐ ˈsilvɐ, ɐ̃ˈtɔnju -]; born 23 November 1952) is a Portuguese professor, businessman and politician who served as Minister of the Economy and Maritime Affairs in the third cabinet of Prime Minister António Costa from 2022 to 2024.

== Early life and education ==
Costa Silva studied Mining Engineering at Technical University of Lisbon's Higher Technical Institute, going on to earn a master’s in Petroleum Engineering from Imperial College and a PhD in Petroleum Reserve Engineering from both his previous colleges.

== Career ==
Costa Silva started working in Angola at Sonangol in 1980, and from 1984 to 1997, he worked at Companhia Portuguesa de Serviços.

He was Director of Reservoir Engineering and Production at Beicip-Franlab, the corporate branch of the French Petroleum Institute, in Paris from 2001 to 2003, Executive Director of the Compagnie Géneral de Géophysique in Portugal from 1998 to 2001 and CEO of Partex from 2004 to 2021.

Costa Silva is professor emeritus at the Higher Technical Institute, where he taught Planning and Integrated Management of Energy Resources.

In 2020 he was tasked by Prime Minister António Costa to draw up Portugal's COVID-19 pandemic economic recovery programme for the use of the European Union funds.

Political offices
Preceded by Pedro Siza Vieira	Minister of Economy; 2022–present	Incumbent
Preceded by Ricardo Serrão Santos	Minister of Maritime Affairs; 2022–present	Incumbent
