= Ana Paula Vitorino =

Portuguese politician (born 1962)

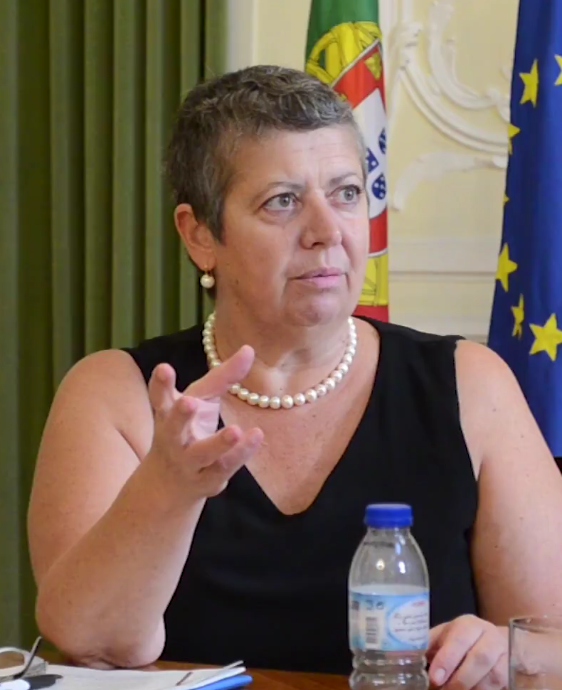

Minister of Maritime Affairs
- In office 26 November 2015 – 26 October 2019
- Prime Minister: António Costa
- Preceded by: Assunção Cristas (as Minister of Agriculture)
- Succeeded by: Ricardo Serrão Santos

Personal details
- Born: 1962 (age 63–64) Maputo, Mozambique
- Party: Socialist Party

Ana Paula Mendes Vitorino (born 25 April 1962) is a Portuguese politician who most recently served as Minister of Maritime Affairs from 2015 to 2019, in the XXI Constitutional Government.

== Biography ==
Daughter to parents from Vila do Cano, in Sousel, she was born in Lourenço Marques (known as Maputo from 1976), having lived in Beira, a Mozambican city, until she was 12 years old. Her father was in the military and she has a brother and sister who both studied medicine.

She has a degree in Civil Engineering, specializing in Urbanization and Transport, from the Instituto Superior Técnico (IST) of the Technical University of Lisbon in 1986 and a master's degree in Transport from the same institution in 1992, where she is an Assistant Professor of the Department of Civil Engineering, Architecture and Georesources, since 1989.

Since 1989 she has been a researcher at CESUR - Centre for Urban and Regional Systems at IST. She is married to Eduardo Cabrita, a colleague in the Government as Minister of Internal Affairs and has no children by choice. They live in Almoster, in the district of Santarém.

From 2005 to 2009, Vitorino served as the Secretary of State for Transport. Elected as a deputy in the Assembly of the Republic in the 2019 Portuguese legislative election she resigned in mid-2021 to be replaced by Sofia Andrade. In August 201 she took up the position of Chair of the Management Board of the Portuguese Mobility and Transport Authority, Autoridade da Mobilidade e dos Transportes.

She was diagnosed with cancer in 2007, when she was Secretary of State for Transport, and in January 2016, two months after she was sworn in as Minister of the Sea.

== Positions held ==
- Chief of Staff of the Secretary of State for Transport of the XIII Constitutional Government (1995–1999)
- Chairman of the Group, the Monitoring Committee and the International Public Tender Committee for the design, construction, supply of equipment, financing, operation and maintenance of the Metro do Sul do Tejo (1999–2002)
- Member of the Institute of Financial and Asset Management of Justice (2000–2001)
- President of the Institute of Financial and Asset Management of Justice (2001–2002)
- National Secretary of the PS (2004–2011)
- Secretary of State for Transport of the XVII Constitutional Government (2005–2009)
- Member of the Assembly of the Republic for the PS in the XI and XII legislatures (2009–2015)
- Director of the Cahora Bassa Hydroelectric Power Plant (2010–2012)
- Managing Partner of TransNetWork (2011–2015)
- Director and Editor-in-Chief of Cluster do Mar Magazine (2012–2015)
- 1st Secretary of the Board of the Porto Municipal Assembly (2013–2017)
- Minister of the Sea of the XXI Constitutional Government (2015–2019)
- Member of the Assembly of the Republic for the PS in the XIV legislature (2019–2021)
- Chair of the Management Board of the Mobility and Transport Authority (2021–present)
