= Manuel Castro Almeida =

Portuguese lawyer and politician (born 1957)

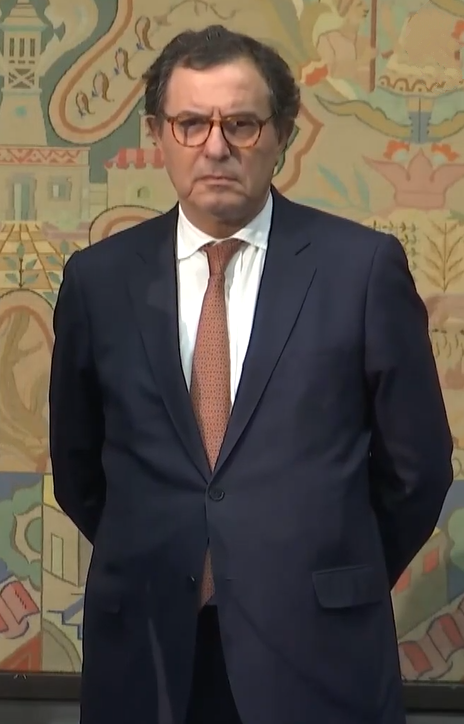
- Castro Almeida in 2024

Minister of Economy and of Territorial Cohesion
- Incumbent
- Assumed office 5 June 2025
- Prime Minister: Luís Montenegro
- Preceded by: Pedro Reis (as Minister of Economy); Himself (as Minister Adjunct and for Territorial Cohesion)

Minister Adjunct and for Territorial Cohesion
- In office 2 April 2024 – 5 June 2025
- Prime Minister: Luís Montenegro
- Preceded by: Ana Catarina Mendes (as Minister Adjunct); Ana Abrunhosa (as Minister for Territorial Cohesion)
- Succeeded by: Gonçalo Saraiva Matias (as Minister Adjunct and for State Reform); Himself (as Minister of Economy and for Territorial Cohesion)

Secretary of State for Regional Development
- In office 13 April 2013 – 30 October 2015
- Prime Minister: Pedro Passos Coelho
- Minister: Miguel Poiares Maduro

Mayor of São João da Madeira
- In office 16 December 2001 – 12 April 2013
- Preceded by: Manuel Cambra
- Succeeded by: Ricardo Figueiredo

Secretary of State for Education and Sports
- In office 7 December 1993 – 28 October 1995
- Prime Minister: Aníbal Cavaco Silva
- Minister: Manuela Ferreira Leite

Member of the Assembly of the Republic
- In office 6 October 1991 – 15 December 2001
- Constituency: Aveiro

Personal details
- Born: Manuel Castro Almeida; 28 October 1957 (age 68) São João da Madeira, Portugal
- Party: Social Democratic Party
- Education: University of Coimbra
- Occupation: Lawyer • Politician

Manuel Castro Almeida (born 28 October 1957) is a Portuguese lawyer and politician who has been serving as Minister in Adjunct and for Territorial Cohesion in the government of Prime Minister Luís Montenegro since 2024.

== Political career ==
Castro Almeida was Secretary of State for Regional Development in the government of Pedro Passos Coelho. Previously, he was a member of the Assembly of the Republic for the Social Democratic Party, Secretary of State for Education and Sports and Mayor of São João da Madeira.

With the arrival of Rui Rio as president of the Social Democratic Party in 2018, Castro Almeida was chosen to be one of the party's vice-presidents. He resigned in July 2019.
