= Carlos Miguel (politician) =

Portuguese politician

Deputy Minister for Regional Development
- Incumbent
- Assumed office 26 October 2019
- Prime Minister: António Costa

Secretary of State for Local Administration
- In office 26 November 2015 – 26 October 2019
- Prime Minister: António Costa

Mayor of Torres Vedras
- In office 2004–2015

Personal details
- Born: 1957 (age 68–69) Torres Vedras, Portugal
- Party: Socialist Party
- Education: University of Lisbon
- Profession: Lawyer
- Cabinet: Costa's first and second

Carlos Manuel Soares Miguel (born in 1957) is a Portuguese lawyer and politician serving as Deputy Minister for Regional Development in Prime Minister António Costa's second cabinet. Previously he was Secretary of State for Local Administration in Costa's first cabinet and Mayor of Torres Vedras. He is the first person of Romani ethnicity to become a cabinet member in Portugal.

== Education and career ==
Miguel was born in Torres Vedras in 1957 to an ethnically Romani father and a non-Romani mother.

He graduated in law at the University of Lisbon in 1982, having specialised in Legal-Economic Sciences. He worked as a lawyer for seventeen years, until 2001. In his hometown of Torres Vedras, he was alderman, president of the Municipal Assembly, deputy mayor and, finally, mayor, having held this position from 2004 to 2015.

Miguel was chairman of the Board of Administration of the Water and Sanitation Municipal Services company, member of the Board of Administration of Águas do Oeste SA, chairman of the general assembly of Valorsul SA, president of the Oeste Region Intermunicipal Community and member of the Advisory Body for the Integration of Romani Communities of the Portuguese High Commission for Migrations (Grupo Consultivo para a Integração das Comunidades Ciganas do Alto Comissariado para as Migrações).
