= XIX Constitutional Government of Portugal =

Cabinet of Portugal between 2011 and 2015, led by Pedro Passos Coelho

XIX Constitutional Government of Portugal XIX Governo Constitucional de Portugal
- Cabinet of Portugal

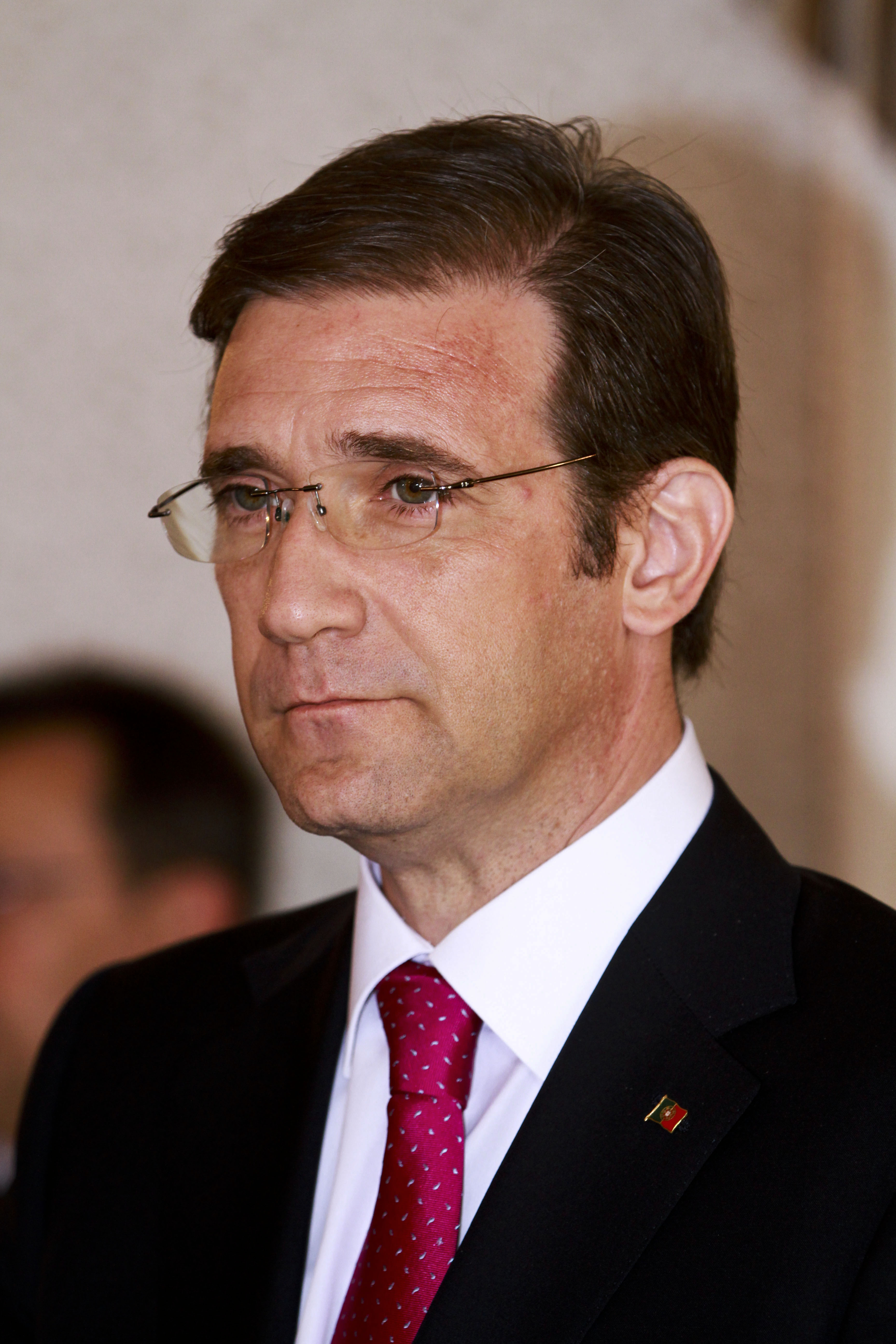
- Prime Minister Pedro Passos Coelho
- Date formed: 21 June 2011
- Date dissolved: 30 October 2015 (4 years, 4 months and 9 days)

People and organisations
- President of the Republic: Aníbal Cavaco Silva
- Prime Minister: Pedro Passos Coelho
- Vice Prime Minister: Paulo Portas (2013–2015)
- No. of ministers: Until 24 July 2013: 11 ministers (Note: Not including the Prime Minister.); After 24 July 2013: 13 ministers (Note: Not including the Prime Minister and his deputy.)
- Member parties: Social Democratic Party (PSD); CDS – People's Party (CDS–PP)
- Status in legislature: Majority coalition government
- Opposition parties: Socialist Party (PS); Portuguese Communist Party (PCP); Left Bloc (BE); Ecologist Party "The Greens" (PEV)

History
- Elections: 2011 Portuguese legislative election (5 June 2011)
- Predecessor: XVIII Constitutional Government of Portugal
- Successor: XX Constitutional Government of Portugal

The XIX Constitutional Government of Portugal (Portuguese: XIX Governo Constitucional de Portugal) was the 19th government of the Third Portuguese Republic, under the current Constitution. It was in office from 21 June 2011 to 30 October 2015, and was formed by a centre-right coalition between the Social Democratic Party (PSD) and the CDS – People's Party (CDS–PP). Pedro Passos Coelho, leader of the PSD, served as Prime Minister.

== Party breakdown ==
Party breakdown of cabinet ministers by the end of the government's time in office: (Prime Minister not included)

- Social Democratic Party
7
- CDS – People's Party
4
- Independents
3

== Composition ==
The government was initially composed of the Prime Minister and 11 ministries comprising ministers, secretaries and under-secretaries of state. On 24 July 2013 a reorganization took effect, creating the position of Deputy Prime Minister and increasing the number of ministries to 13.

Office	Minister	Party	Start of term	End of term
Prime Minister	Pedro Passos Coelho	PSD	21 June 2011	30 October 2015
Deputy Prime Minister (Note: Position created on 24 July 2013.)	Paulo Portas	CDS–PP	24 July 2013	30 October 2015
Minister of State and Finance	Vítor Gaspar	Independent	21 June 2011	1 July 2013
Minister of State and Finance	Maria Luís Albuquerque	PSD	1 July 2013	30 October 2015
Minister of State and Foreign Affairs	Paulo Portas	CDS–PP	21 June 2011	24 July 2013
Minister of State and Foreign Affairs	Rui Machete	PSD	24 July 2013	30 October 2015
Minister of National Defence	José Pedro Aguiar-Branco	PSD	21 June 2011	30 October 2015
Minister of Internal Administration	Miguel Macedo	PSD	21 June 2011	19 November 2014
Minister of Internal Administration	Anabela Miranda Rodrigues	Independent	19 November 2014	30 October 2015
Minister of Justice	Paula Teixeira da Cruz	PSD	21 June 2011	30 October 2015
Minister of Economy	Álvaro Santos Pereira	Independent	21 June 2011	24 July 2013
Minister of Economy	António Pires de Lima	CDS–PP	24 July 2013	30 October 2015
Minister of Agriculture and Sea	Assunção Cristas	CDS–PP	21 June 2011	30 October 2015
Minister of Environment, Spatial Planning and Energy	Jorge Moreira da Silva	PSD	24 July 2013	30 October 2015
Minister of Health	Paulo Macedo	Independent	21 June 2011	30 October 2015
Minister of Education and Science	Nuno Crato	Independent	21 June 2011	30 October 2015
Ministry of Solidarity, Employment and Social Security	Pedro Mota Soares	CDS–PP	21 June 2011	30 October 2015
Ministry of Parliamentary Affairs	Miguel Relvas	PSD	21 June 2011	13 April 2013
Ministry of Parliamentary Affairs	Luís Marques Guedes	PSD	13 April 2013	30 October 2015
Assistant Minister to the Prime Minister and of Regional Development (Note: Position created on 13 April 2013.)	Miguel Poiares Maduro	PSD	13 April 2013	30 October 2015
