= João Costa (politician) =

Portuguese politician (born 1972)

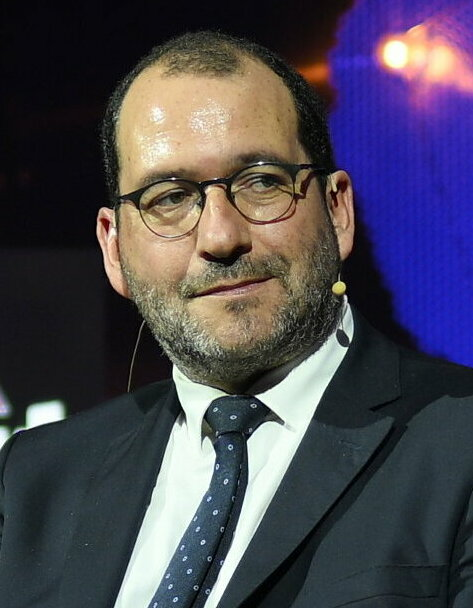
- Costa in 2022

Minister of Education
- In office 30 March 2022 – 2 April 2024
- Prime Minister: António Costa
- Preceded by: Tiago Brandão Rodrigues
- Succeeded by: Fernando Alexandre (as Minister of Education, Science and Innovation)

Secretary of State for Education
- In office 26 November 2015 – 30 March 2022
- Prime Minister: António Costa
- Preceded by: Amélia Loureiro
- Succeeded by: António Leite

Personal details
- Born: João Miguel Marques da Costa; 4 November 1972 (age 53) Lisbon, Portugal
- Party: Socialist Party

João Miguel Marques da Costa (born 4 November 1972) is a Portuguese politician from the Socialist Party. He was the Minister of Education in the XXIII Constitutional Government of Portugal.
