= Ministério da Educação =

Ministério da Educação (Ministry of Education) may refer to:

- Ministério da Educação (Brazil), the Brazilian education ministry.
- Ministério da Educação (Portugal), the Portuguese education ministry.
