= Fernando Alexandre =

Fernando Alexandre may refer to:

- Fernando Alexandre (footballer)
- Fernando Alexandre (politician)
