= Ricardo Serrão Santos =

Portuguese politician (born 1954)

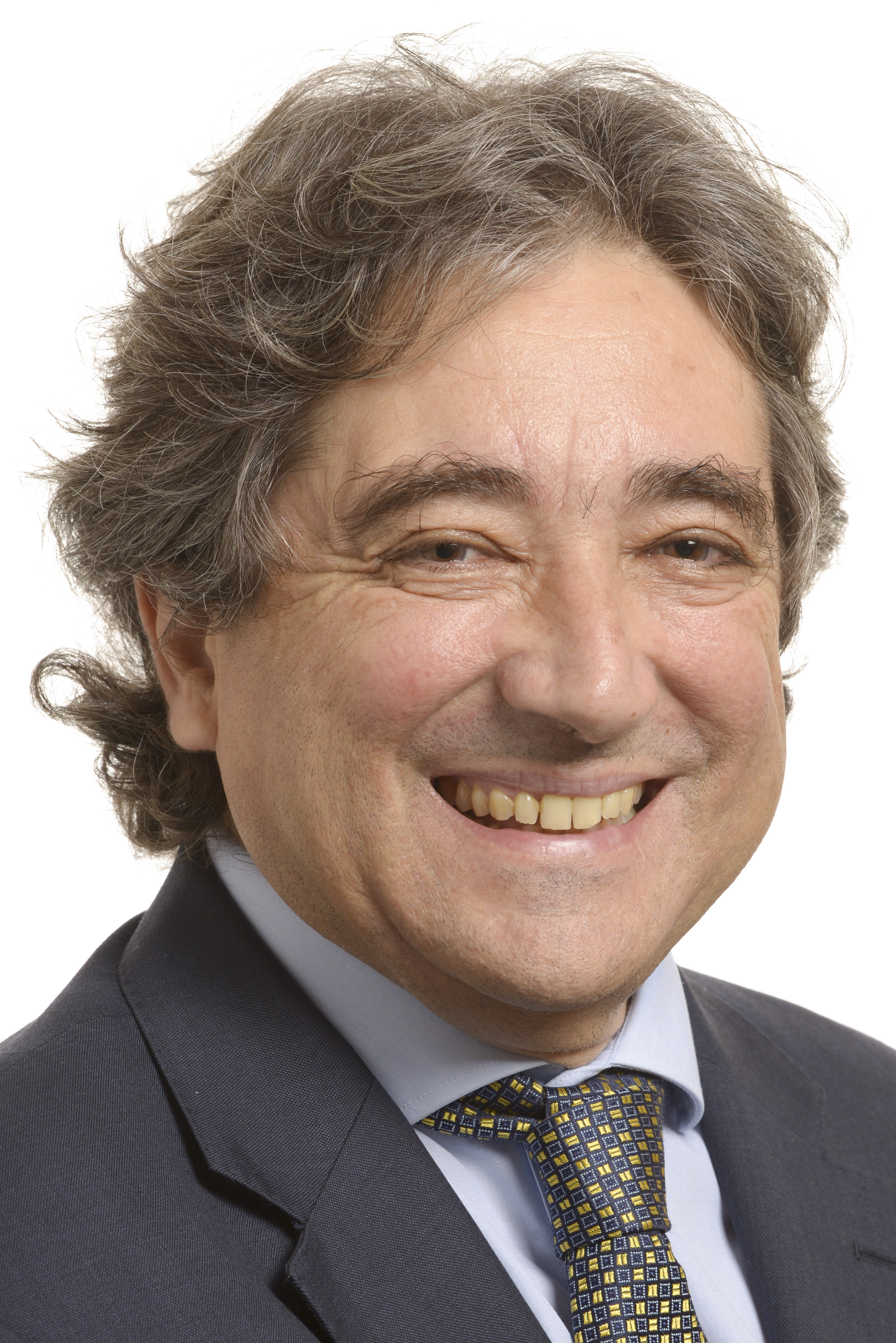
- Official portrait as an MEP, 2014

Minister of Maritime Affairs
- In office 26 October 2019 – 30 March 2022
- Preceded by: Ana Paula Vitorino
- Succeeded by: António Costa Silva

Personal details
- Born: 11 October 1954 (age 71) Portalegre, Portugal
- Party: Socialist Party

Ricardo da Piedade Abreu Serrão Santos (born 11 October 1954 in Portalegre) is a Portuguese biologist and university lecturer, Vice Chancellor of the University of the Azores, a deputy to the European Parliament eighth term, and from 2019 to 2022 he was the Minister of Maritime Affairs.

== Curriculum vitae ==
In 1979, he obtained a bachelor's degree from the ISPA psychology institute in Lisbon, and in 1984 a master's degree from the University of the Azores. He then studied at the University of Liverpool, and in 1993 he obtained a doctorate in biology at the University of the Azores. Professionally associated with this university. In the years 1989–1991 he was one of the directors of the oceanography and fisheries department, and from 1997 to 2001 he headed this department. In 1993 he joined the board of the IMAR marine research institute, in 1997 he became vice president, and in 2006 he became the president of this institution. In 2003 he also became vice-chancellor of the University of the Azores.

He specializes in issues combining etiology and ecology. Appointed to the bodies and advisory boards of various national and international scientific institutions, he also served as an expert in Portuguese ministries and regional government.

He was a candidate of the Socialist Party at the 2014 European Parliament election, gaining the mandate of the MEP of the 8th term, which he performed until 2019. In October that year, he took the office of the minister for maritime affairs in the second government of António Costa, the incumbent prime minister.

He was the campaign chair for the Azores of António José Seguro's 2026 presidential campaign.
