= Fernando Alexandre (politician) =

Portuguese economist and politician (born 1972)

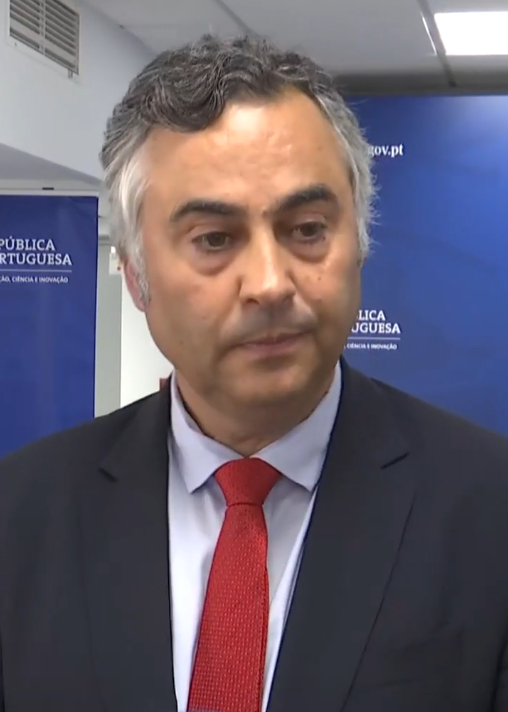
- Alexandre in 2025

Minister of Education, Science and Innovation
- Incumbent
- Assumed office 2 April 2024
- Prime Minister: Luís Montenegro
- Preceded by: Elvira Fortunato (Minister of Science, Technology and Higher Education); João Costa (Minister of Education)

Secretary of State of Internal Administration
- In office 22 April 2013 – 22 April 2015
- Prime Minister: Pedro Passos Coelho
- Minister: Miguel Macedo; Anabela Miranda Rodrigues

Personal details
- Born: Fernando Manuel de Almeida Alexandre; 1972 (age 53–54) Gafanha da Nazaré, Portugal
- Party: Independent
- Spouse: Anabela Filipe Alexandre
- Children: 3
- Education: University of Coimbra; University of London
- Occupation: Economist • Politician

Fernando Manuel de Almeida Alexandre (born 1972) is a Portuguese professor and politician. He has been Minister of Education, Science and Innovation since 2024, in the XXIV Constitutional Government, led by Luís Montenegro. He was also Secretary of State of Internal Administration in the XIX Constitutional Government, led by Pedro Passos Coelho.

He has been an Associate Professor at the Department of Economics at the University of Minho since 2009, having completed his degree and master's degree in Economics at the University of Coimbra and completed his PhD in Economics at the University of London - Birkbeck College with a dissertation on monetary policy and financial markets, in 2003. In 2026, he got heavily criticised by parents and students due to the postponement of the results of the National Exams, and the way the situation was being handled. This caused the students and parents to create a petition to nullify the exam without prejudicing the students.
