= Ministry (government department) =

Type of top-level division of public administration

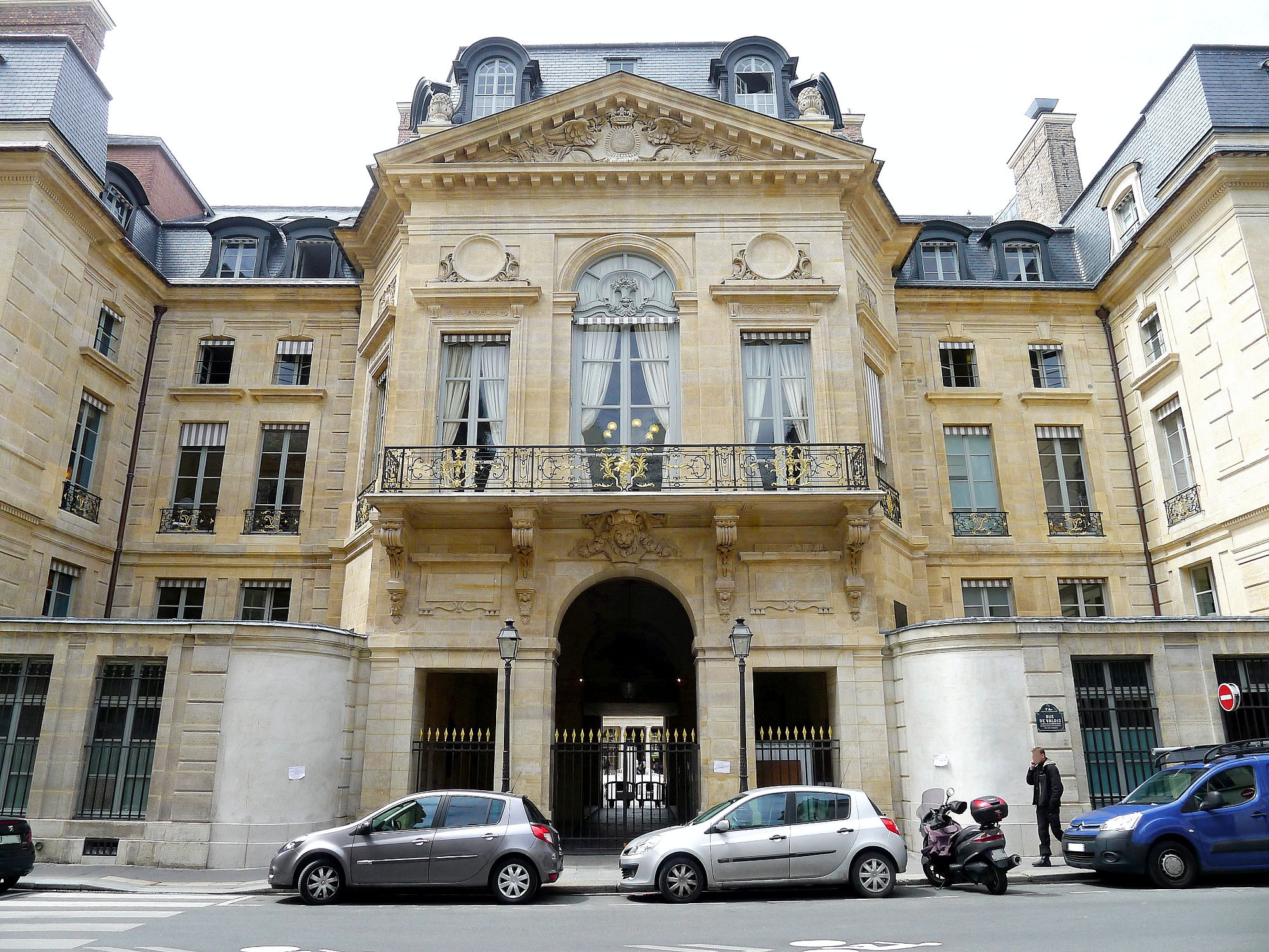
The seat of the French Ministry of Culture on the Rue de Valois in Paris

Ministry or department (also less commonly used secretariat, office, or directorate) are designations used by first-level executive bodies in the machinery of governments that manage a specific sector of public administration.

These types of organizations are usually led by a politician who is a member of a cabinet—a body of high-ranking government officials—who may use a title such as minister, secretary, or commissioner, and are typically staffed with members of a non-political civil service, who manage its operations; they may also oversee other government agencies and organizations as part of a political portfolio. Policies of ministries can be evaluated relative to the median voter.

Governments may have differing numbers and types of ministries and departments. In some countries, these terms may be used with specific meanings: for example, an office may be a subdivision of a department or ministry.

== By country ==
=== Canada ===
The federal Government of Canada uses the term department in English and ministère (ministry) in French to refer to its first-level executive bodies.

==== Subdivisions ====
In Canada, first-level subdivisions are known as provinces and territories. Five of the ten provincial governments use the term ministry to describe their departments (Ontario, Quebec, Saskatchewan, British Columbia, and Alberta) but the other five, as well as the three territorial governments, use the term department. Despite the difference in nomenclature, both the provincial and federal governments use the term "minister" to describe the head of a ministry or department. The specific task assigned to a minister is referred to as his or her "portfolio".

=== France ===
The Government of France is made up of different ministries.

=== Germany ===
Since May 6, 2025, there have been 17 ministries in the Merz cabinet.

=== United Kingdom ===
In the United Kingdom, all government organisations that consist of civil servants, and which may or may not be headed by a government minister or secretary of state, are considered to be departments. Until 2018, the term "ministry" had been retained only for the Ministry of Defence and the Ministry of Justice. On 8 January 2018, Prime Minister Theresa May announced that the Department of Communities and Local Government would be renamed to the Ministry of Housing, Communities and Local Government to emphasise her government's prioritising of housing policy. In September 2021, Prime Minister Boris Johnson reverted the ministry to a department, renaming it the Department for Levelling Up, Housing and Communities and giving it the responsibility of overseeing his government's levelling up policy. It was then subsequently reverted to the Ministry of Housing, Communities and Local Government under the Starmer government in 2024.

=== Other countries ===
Some countries, such as Switzerland, the Philippines and the United States, do not use or no longer use the term "ministry" and instead call their main government bodies "departments". However, in other countries such as Luxembourg a department is a subdivision of a ministry, usually led by a government member called a secretary of state who is subordinate to the minister.

In Australia at the federal level, and also at the state level, the term ministry refers to the ministerial office held by a member of Cabinet, the executive, which is then responsible for one or more departments, the top division of the public service. The collection of departments responsible to a ministerial office and hence the minister, is referred to as the minister's "portfolio".

New Zealand's state agencies include many ministries and a smaller number of departments. Increasingly, state agencies are styled neither as ministries nor as departments. All New Zealand agencies are under the direction of one or more ministers or associate ministers, whether they are styled ministries or not. Each body also has an apolitical chief executive, and in ministries and departments these chief executives often have the title of Secretary.

In Indonesia, the term ministry (Indonesian: Kementerian) is used. From the New Order to 2009, the office was known as department (Indonesian: Departemen).

In Malaysia, the term ministry is used for all but one government cabinet portfolio. The Prime Minister Department is the only portfolio that uses department instead. All government portfolios in the Peninsular Malaysia states use committee, while Sabah and Sarawak state governments following the federal government's style in naming certain portfolios.

In Hong Kong, the term bureau is used, except the Department of Justice. Otherwise, departments are subordinate to bureaus.

In Mexico, ministries are referred to as secretariats.

In 1999, the ministries of the federal government of Belgium became known as federal public service, the exception being the Ministry of Defense which kept the original designation.

In the Republic of China, ministry is used.

In the People's Republic of China, ministry is used. Ministerial agencies that has collective leadership are called commissions, such as the National Health Commission and National Development and Reform Commission

In Portugal, the organization adopted by the XXI (2015–2019) and the XXII (2019-2024) governments ceased to expressly foresee the existence of ministries, with the portfolios of the ministers being instead referred as "government areas" and having, in theory, a more flexible organization. Although the term "ministry" has been eliminated from the Government communication and from most of the new published laws, it continues to be used in some legislation, especially those referring to some government areas that existed for a long time as ministries (Finance, National Defense, Foreign Affairs, Health, etc.). The term "ministry" also continues to be used as the vernacular to refer to a government area.

In Nigeria, each ministry is led by a minister who is not a member of the Nigerian legislature (due to the separation of powers) and is responsible to the popularly elected president.

In Lebanon, there are 21 ministries. Each ministry is led by a minister, and the prime minister is the 23rd minister of the Lebanese government.

In the European Union, the equivalent organisation to a national government department is termed directorate-general with the civil servant in charge called a director-general (in the European Commission, the political head of the department is one of the European Commissioners).

The government departments of the Soviet Union were termed people's commissariats between 1917 and 1946. Ministry was used, thereafter. In Russia, ministry is used.

== In popular culture ==
The term ministry has also been widely used in fiction, notably in satires and parodies.

=== Books and films ===
Portrayals of various fictional government ministries include:

- The Ministry of Magic is the governing body of the wizarding world of the United Kingdom and Ireland in the Harry Potter series (not a department of the British Government responsible for magical affairs). It is led by a Minister for Magic.
- In the novel Nineteen Eighty-Four there are four Ministries in charge of Oceania: the Ministry of Truth (education, culture and propaganda), the Ministry of Love (the interior, security and policing), the Ministry of Plenty (economic affairs) and the Ministry of Peace (war and foreign affairs).
- The Ministry of Information Retrieval features in the film Brazil.
- The Ministry of Social Coherence appears in an Estonian comedy series Riigimehed (Statesmen).

=== Television ===
- In Yes Minister the Department of Administrative Affairs (DAA) is responsible for the administration of other government departments and the British Civil Service. This ministry had a number of other responsibilities, including National Health Service administration, local government, organising state visits by foreign leaders, enforcing European regulations, the arts and telecommunications.
- The Thick of It is set at the fictional Department of Social Affairs, later called the Department of Social Affairs and Citizenship, or "DoSAC" for short.
- The Ministry of Silly Walks is the subject of a sketch in Monty Python's Flying Circus.
- The Spanish television show El ministerio del tiempo follows the exploits of an investigative team in the fictional Ministry of Time, which deals with incidents caused by time travel that can cause changes to the present day

== See also ==
- Cabinet (government)
- Ministry (collective executive)
- Individual ministerial responsibility
- Housing authority
- Ministry of Social Security
