= National Council for Education in Portugal =

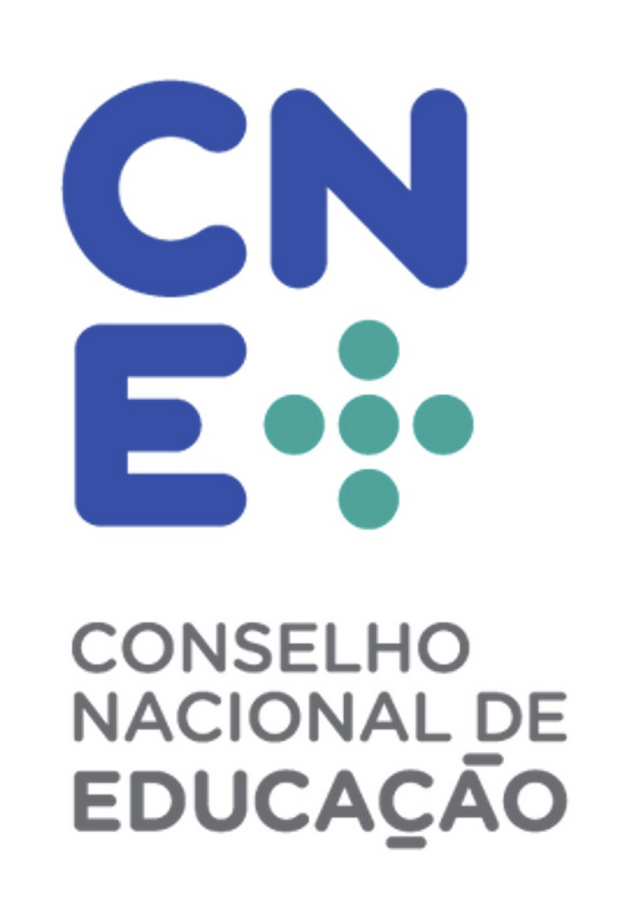
- Formation: 1982
- Purpose: Education
- Origins: Portugal
- Official language: Portuguese
- President: Domingos Fernandes
- Secretary-General: Nilza de Sena
- Website: https://www.cnedu.pt/pt/

The National Council for Education, (Conselho Nacional de Educação - CNEdu) was established in 1982 by Decree-Law No. 125/82 of April 22 as a senior advisory body to the then Minister of Education of Portugal. Its purpose is to propose measures to ensure the continuous adaptation of the education system to the needs of Portuguese citizens.

== Mission ==
The National Council for Education is an independent advisory body, and its president is elected by the Assembly of the Republic.

CNEdu is responsible for issuing opinions, statements, and recommendations on all matters related to education, either on its own initiative or in response to requests from the Assembly of the Republic or the Government.

Its mission is to encourage the participation of scientific, social, cultural, and economic sectors to build broad consensus on educational policy (Organic Law – Decree-Law No. 21/2015).

== Responsibilities ==
1 — CNEdu is responsible, either on its own initiative or when requested by the Assembly of the Republic or the Government, for the following:

a) Supporting the formulation and monitoring of educational policy under the Government's responsibility, through cooperation between public administration, experts, and representatives of academic, social, and economic sectors;

b) Reviewing and issuing opinions and recommendations on the implementation of national policies regarding the educational, scientific, and technological systems, including educational objectives and measures, particularly in terms of policy definition, coordination, promotion, implementation, and evaluation;

c) Promoting reflection and debate to develop proposals aligned with its mission and the goals of the educational system.

2 — CNEdu is also responsible for monitoring the implementation and development of the Basic Law of the Educational System, approved by Law No. 46/86 of October 14, and for providing a mandatory prior opinion within 30 days on draft laws or legislative proposals aimed at amending it.

3 — Additionally, CNEdu is responsible for:

a) Establishing permanent specialized committees;

b) Publishing reports, opinions, or other works produced within the scope of its responsibilities;

c) Approving the annual activity plan and its corresponding report;

d) Approving the draft budget;

e) Approving its internal regulations.

== Publications ==
The National Council for Education (CNEdu) of Portugal produces various publications, organized into collections such as:

- Reports on the State of Education in Portugal;
- Opinions and Recommendations;
- Seminars and Colloquia;
- Studies and Reports;
- Other Publications;
- Dica – a project aimed at providing a clearer and deeper understanding of the activities carried out in schools, showcasing concrete examples of innovative educational practices.

== Presidents ==
- 2022 – present — Domingos Fernandes.
- 2017 – 2022 — Maria Emília Brederode Santos.
- 2013 – 2017 — José David Justino.
- 2009 – 2013 — Ana Maria Bettencourt.
- 2005 – 2009 — Júlio Pedrosa.
- 2002 – 2005 — Manuel Porto.
- 1996 – 2002 — Teresa Ambrósio.
- 1992 – 1995 — Marçal Grilo.
- 1991 – 1992 — Barbosa de Melo.
- 1988 – 1991 — Mário Pinto.
- The position of Secretary-General has been held by Nilza de Sena since 2024.
