= Eduardo Cabrita =

Portuguese legal professional and politician

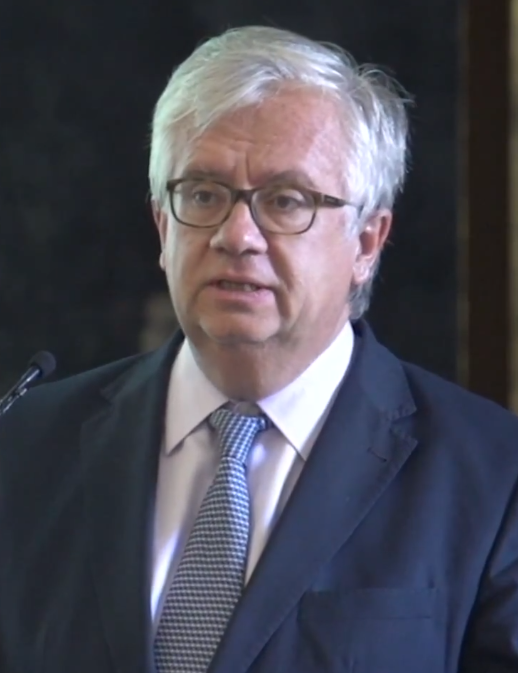

Minister of Internal Administration
- In office 21 October 2017 – 4 December 2021
- Prime Minister: António Costa
- Preceded by: Constança Urbano de Sousa
- Succeeded by: Francisca Van Dunem

Assistant Minister
- In office 26 November 2015 – 21 October 2017
- Prime Minister: António Costa
- Preceded by: Miguel Poiares Maduro
- Succeeded by: Pedro Siza Vieira

Personal details
- Born: Eduardo Arménio do Nascimento Cabrita; 26 September 1961 (age 64) Barreiro, Setúbal district
- Party: Socialist Party
- Spouse: Ana Paula Vitorino
- Education: University of Lisbon
- Website: www.portugal.gov.pt

Eduardo Arménio do Nascimento Cabrita (born 26 September 1961, in Barreiro) is a Portuguese legal professional and politician who served as Minister Assistant and Minister of Internal Administration in the cabinet of Prime Minister António Costa from 2015 until 2021. He was a member of parliament from 2002 to 2015, before taking office as minister in the Government.

During his time in government, Cabrita faced criticism over a range of incidents, including the death of a Ukrainian immigrant in custody at Lisbon airport; authorization for celebrations of the national football championship that were blamed for spreading COVID-19; and his handling of a coronavirus outbreak among migrant farm hands. On 3 December 2021, he resigned after his driver was accused of “negligent homicide” over the death of a highway worker, while driving Cabrita's car at 40 km/h above the speed limit, being substituted on the day after by the Minister of Justice Francisca Van Dunem.

After the resignation, he resumed his duties as a member of the Assembly of the Republic representing Setúbal, from December 2021 until March 2022.

== Personal life ==
Cabrita is graduated in law from the University of Lisbon School of Law. He is married to Ana Paula Vitorino, who was also a member of António Costa's cabinet as Minister of Maritime Affairs.
