= Miguel Morais Leitão =

Portuguese politician

Minister of Economy
- In office 30 October 2015 – 26 November 2015
- Prime Minister: Pedro Passos Coelho
- Preceded by: António Pires de Lima
- Succeeded by: Manuel Caldeira Cabral

Personal details
- Born: 6 February 1964 (age 62)
- Party: CDS – People's Party

Miguel Morais Leitão (born 6 February 1964) is a Portuguese politician who served as Minister of Economy in 2015. He is a member of the CDS – People's Party. Leitão served as Secretary of State for European Affairs from 2011 to 2013, and as Deputy Secretary of State for the Deputy Prime Minister from 2013 to 2015. He headed the Ministry of Economy under Prime Minister Pedro Passos Coelho from 30 October to 26 November 2015.
