= Pedro Reis (economist) =

Portuguese economist and politician (born 1967)

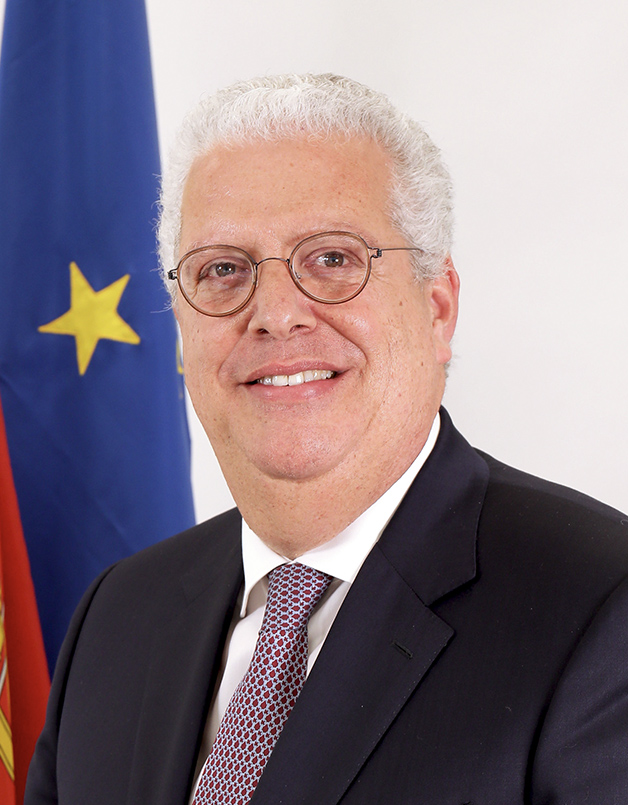
- Official portrait, 2024

Minister of Economy
- In office 2 April 2024 – 5 June 2025
- Prime Minister: Luís Montenegro
- Preceded by: António Costa Silva
- Succeeded by: Manuel Castro Almeida (as Minister of Economy and for Territorial Cohesion)

Personal details
- Born: Pedro Trigo de Morais de Albuquerque Reis; 30 September 1967 (age 59) Lisbon, Portugal
- Party: Social Democratic Party
- Spouse: Rita Reis
- Children: 3
- Education: Catholic University of Portugal; Harvard Business School
- Occupation: Economist • Politician

Pedro Trigo de Morais de Albuquerque Reis (born 30 September 1967) is a Portuguese economist and politician of the Social Democratic Party who has been serving Minister of Economy in the XXIV Constitutional Government, led by Prime Minister Luís Montenegro, since 2024.

Since 3 July 2022, he has been coordinator of the "Movimento Acreditar", a think tank of the Social Democratic Party.

== Early life and education ==
Reis holds a degree in Management and Business Administration from the Portuguese Catholic University (UCP), having completed his academic education with executive courses at Harvard Business School (USA) in Strategic Finance (2005), at Insead (France) in AMP – Advanced Management Program (1995), and also at the UCP in PAGE (Advanced Management Program for Executives in 1994–1995).

== Career ==
From December 2011 to April 2014, Reis was President of AICEP – Agency for Investment and Foreign Trade of Portugal, and held the Executive Secretariat of the Strategic Council for the Internationalization of the Economy (CEIE). He was a member of the National Council for Entrepreneurship and Innovation, was part of the Industry Council within the Ministry of Economy and was a member of the Economic Affairs and Investment Coordination Meeting (RCAEI), coordinating the Permanent Investor Support Committee (CPAI). He was a member of the General and supervisory board of Portugal Ventures and chaired the jury of the “More Economic Diplomacy” Award organized by the Ministry of Foreign Affairs.

In 2014, Reis became Senior Advisor to the executive committee of Banco Millennium bcp, in 2015, executive administrator of BCP Capital, in 2017, he assumed the Strategic Marketing and Business Development Department and, from 2019 to 2021, the Institutional Banking Department at Millennium bcp. He is President of the advisory board of the Portuguese Diaspora Council.
