= Nelson de Souza =

Portuguese economist and politician (born 1954)

Nelson de Souza ComMAIC

Minister of Planning
- In office 18 February 2018 – 26 October 2019
- Prime Minister: António Costa

Secretary of State for Development and Cohesion
- In office 26 November 2015 – 18 November 2019
- Prime Minister: António Costa

Secretary of State for Small and Medium-sized Enterprises, Trade and Services
- In office 18 September 2000 – 3 July 2001

Personal details
- Born: Angelo Nelson do Rosário de Souza; 11 December 1954 (age 71) Portuguese India
- Profession: Economist

Angelo Nelson do Rosário de Souza ComMAIC (born 11 December 1954) is a Portuguese economist and politician who served as Minister of Planning in the XXII Constitutional Government (2019-2022) of Prime Minister António Costa.

== Early life and education ==
Angelo Nelson do Rosário de Souza was born in Portuguese India in 1954. He holds a degree in Finance from the Higher Institute of Economics.

== Career ==
De Souza started his career in the business sector. He was Secretary of State for Small and Medium Enterprises, Trade and Services of the XIV Constitutional Government, and Chief of Staff of the Minister of Economy of the XIII Constitutional Government.

He served as Director General at the Portuguese Industrial Association until the end of 2013, where he had already served on the Executive Committee between 2002 and 2005.

Before taking up functions in the XXI Constitutional Government, he was Municipal Director of Finance in the Lisbon City Council since February 2014, having also served as an advisory of the President.

He was Secretary of State for Development and Cohesion until 18 February 2019.
