= António Pires de Lima =

Portuguese economist, business administrator and politician

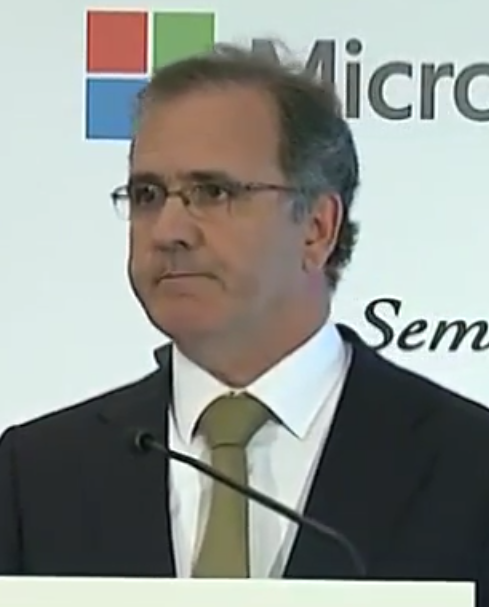

Minister of Economy
- In office 24 July 2013 – 30 October 2015
- Preceded by: Álvaro Santos Pereira
- Succeeded by: Miguel Morais Leitão

Personal details
- Born: 7 April 1962 (age 64) Lisbon, Portugal
- Party: CDS – People's Party (before 2021); Independent (since 2021)
- Education: Catholic University of Portugal
- Profession: economist

António de Magalhães Pires de Lima, usually known as António Pires de Lima (Lisbon, April 7, 1962), is a Portuguese economist, business administrator and politician. He served as Minister of Economy of Portugal between 2013 and 2015 in the Pedro Passos Coelho cabinet. He was CEO of Sumol + Compal and Unicer. He is a founding partner of Horizon Equity Partners, a Portuguese investment management and private equity firm. In 2021, Pires de Lima left the CDS-PP party after decades of prominent membership which included positions as party vice president under the leadership of Paulo Portas, member of parliament (MP) and head of the Portuguese Ministry of Economy. He currently is the CEO of Brisa - Autoestradas de Portugal.

== See also ==
- XIX Constitutional Government of Portugal
