= Manuel Caldeira Cabral =

Portuguese politician

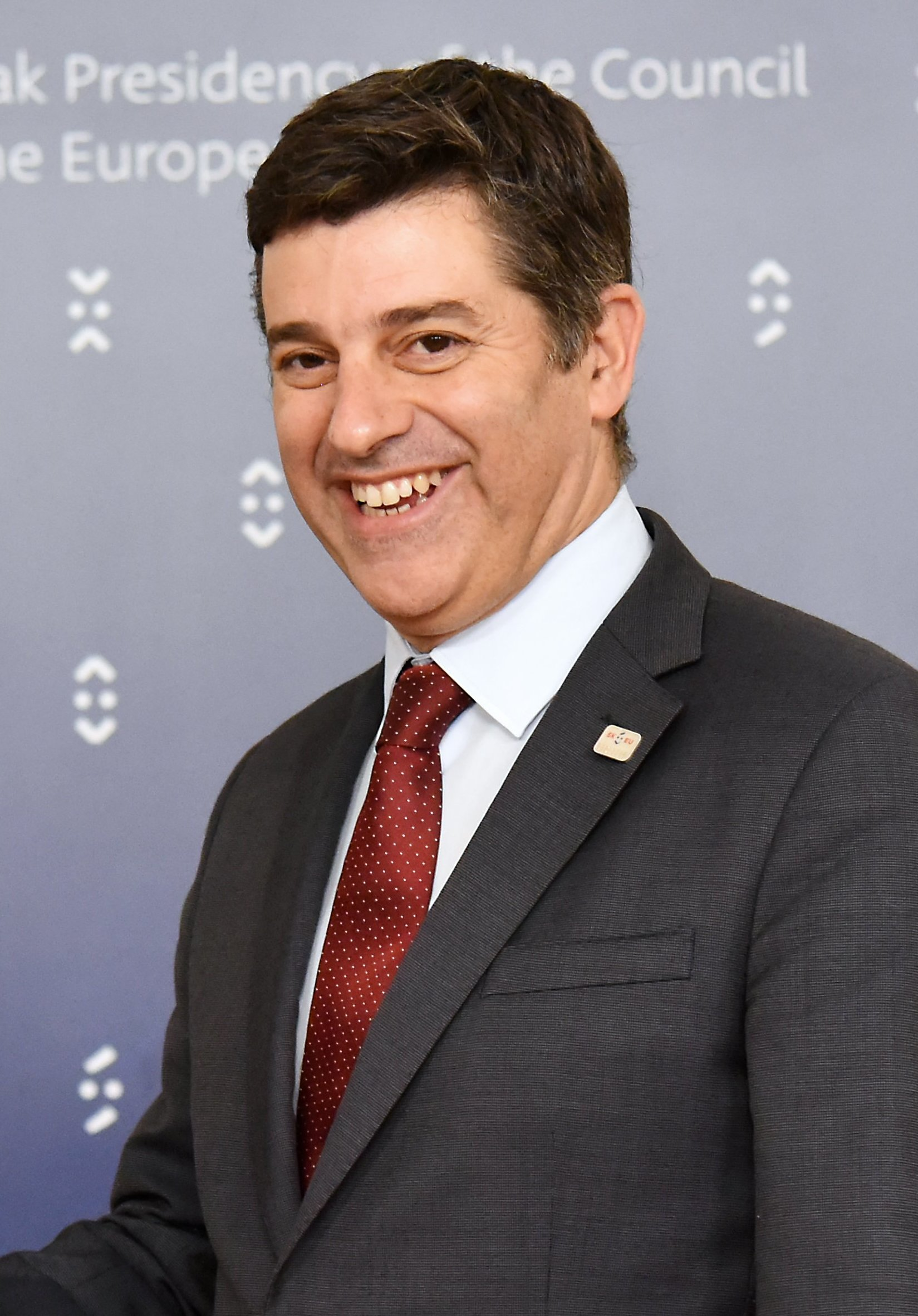

Minister of Economy
- In office 26 November 2015 – 15 October 2018
- Prime Minister: António Costa
- Preceded by: Miguel Morais Leitão
- Succeeded by: Pedro Siza Vieira

Personal details
- Born: 1968 (age 57–58) Lisbon, Portugal

Manuel de Herédia Caldeira Cabral (born 1968) is a Portuguese politician who served as Minister of Economy from 26 November 2015 to 15 October 2018. He served as an economic advisor in the Ministry Finance from 2009 to 2011. Cabral was elected to the Assembly of the Republic by the Braga constituency in 2015. He is first cousin of Isabel, Duchess of Braganza.
