= José Manuel Fernandes =

Portuguese politician (born 1967)

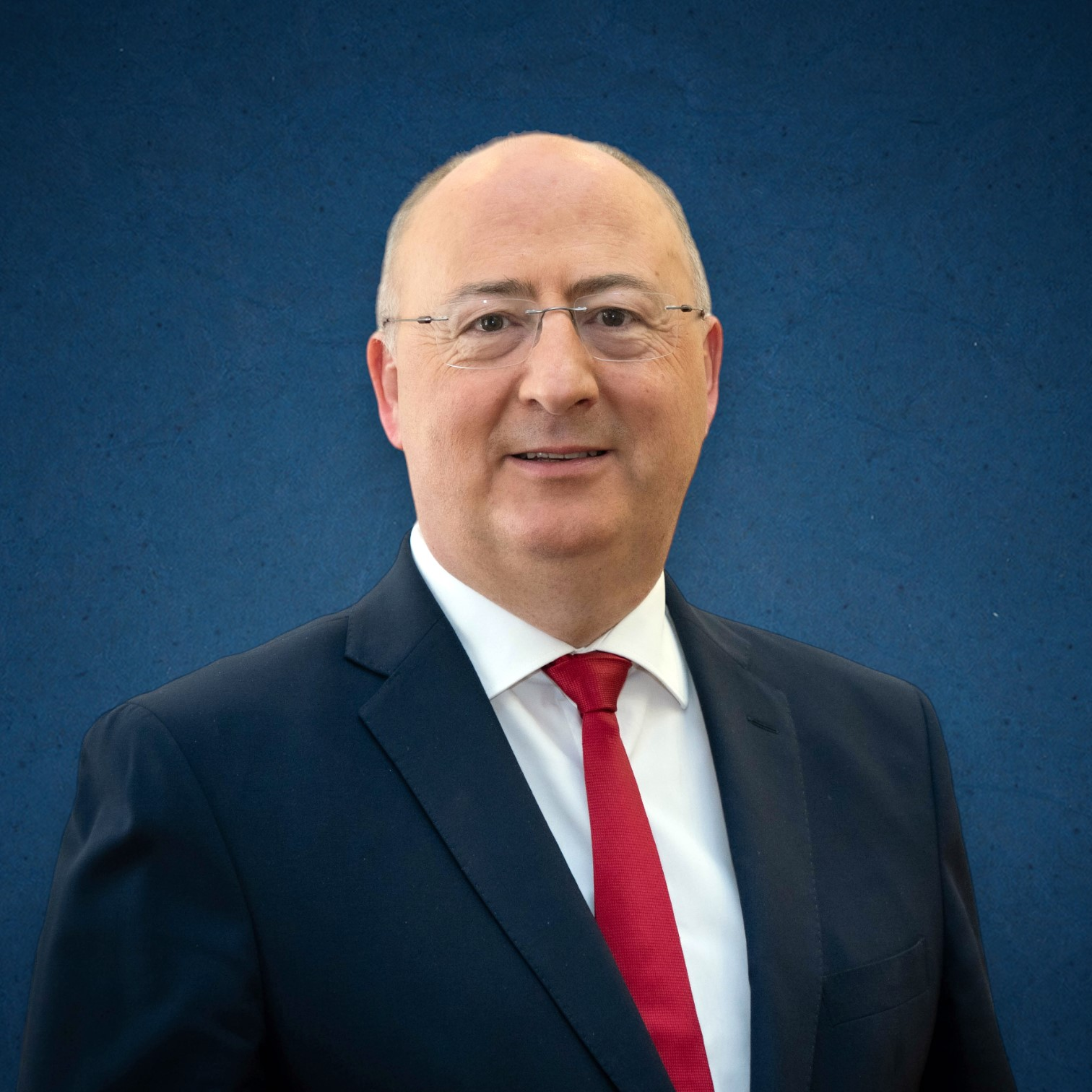
- Fernandes in 2024

Minister of Agriculture
- Incumbent
- Assumed office 2 April 2024
- Prime Minister: Luís Montenegro
- Preceded by: Maria do Céu Antunes

Minister of the Sea
- Incumbent
- Assumed office 5 June 2025
- Prime Minister: Luís Montenegro
- Preceded by: Lídia Bulcão (as Secretary of State for Maritime Affairs)

Member of the European Parliament for Portugal
- In office 14 July 2009 – 1 April 2024
- Succeeded by: Teófilo Santos

Mayor of Vila Verde
- In office 14 December 1997 – 27 April 2009
- Preceded by: António Cerqueira
- Succeeded by: António Vilela

Personal details
- Born: José Manuel Ferreira Fernandes; 26 July 1967 (age 59) Vila Verde, Portugal
- Party: Social Democratic Party
- Education: University of Minho
- Occupation: Information engineer • Politician
- Awards: Order of Rio Branco (2022)

José Manuel Ferreira Fernandes (born 26 July 1967) is a Portuguese politician of the Social Democratic Party. He has been Minister of Agriculture since 2024 and Minister of the Sea since 2025, in the government led by Luís Montenegro.

Previously, Fernandes was a Member of the European Parliament between 2009 and 2024. Earlier in his career, he was Mayor of Vila Verde in northern Portugal (1997–2009).

== Political career ==
=== Early beginnings ===
Fernandes served as president of JSD - Social Democratic Youth of Vila Verde (1992-1993) and as leader of the Braga district political committee of JSD (1994-1996).

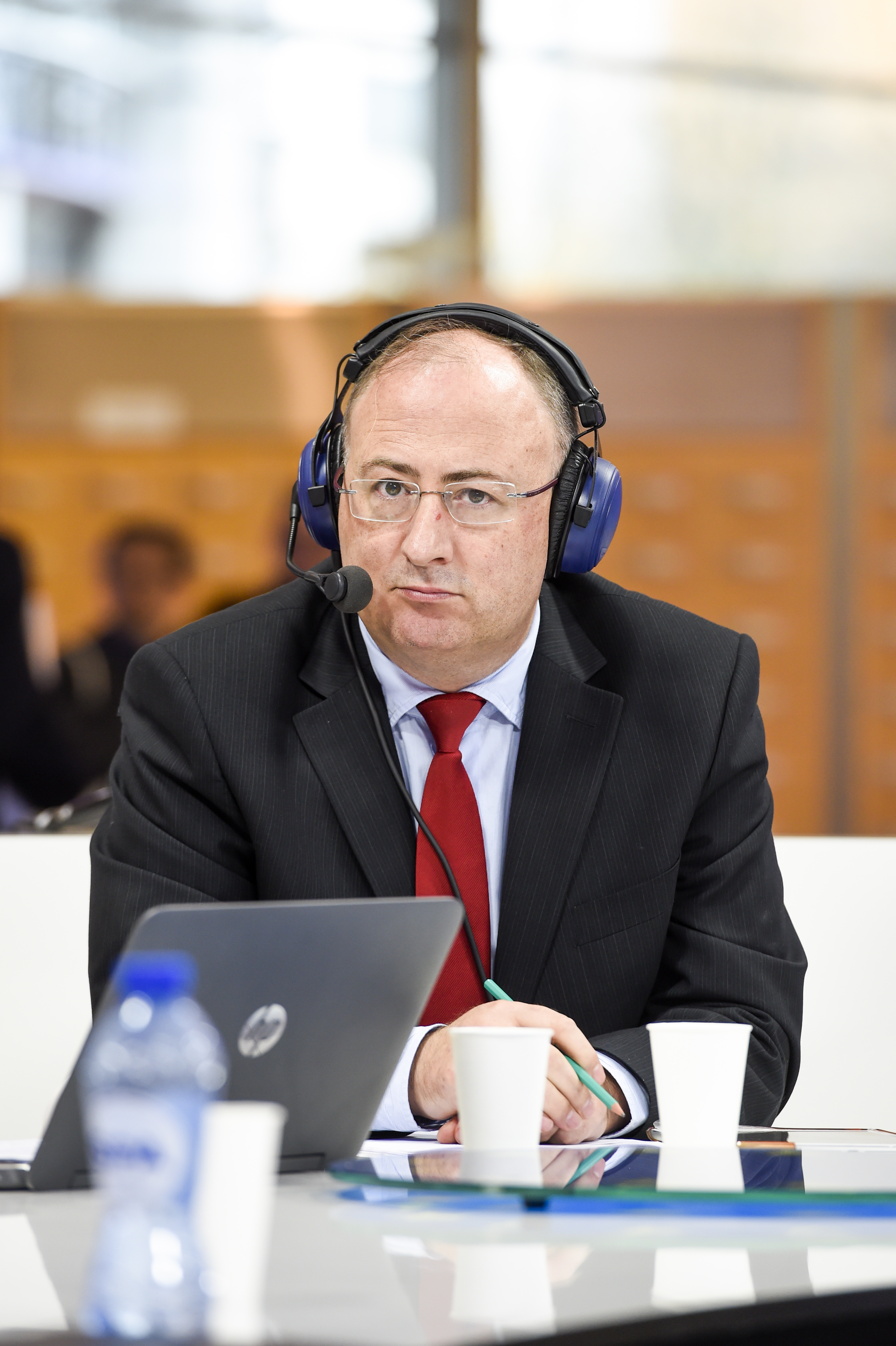
José Manuel Fernandes

=== Member of the European Parliament, 2009–2024 ===
In parliament, Fernandes was a member of the Committee on Budgets. He was also his parliamentary group's coordinator on the committee. In this capacity, he was the parliament's rapporteur on the 2012 and 2016 annual budgets as well as the European Fund for Strategic Investments. In 2020, he served as the Parliament's co-rapporteur (alongside Valérie Hayer) on a successful motion to assign new tax revenues to the budget of the European Union to repay its joint borrowing of 750 billion euros ($888 billion) for economic recovery after the COVID-19 pandemic.

In addition to his committee assignments, Fernandes was part of the parliament's delegations to Brazil, for relations with Mercosur and to the Euro-Latin American Parliamentary Assembly. He had previously been a member of the delegations to China (2009–2014), to the Parliamentary Assembly of the Union for the Mediterranean (2014–2019) and for relations with the Maghreb countries and the Arab Maghreb Union (2014–2019). He was also a member of the European Parliament Intergroup on Seas, Rivers, Islands and Coastal Areas, the European Parliament Intergroup on Disability and the MEPs Against Cancer group.

Following the 2019 elections, Fernandes was part of a cross-party working group in charge of drafting the European Parliament's five-year work program on economic and fiscal policies as well as trade.

== Recognition ==
In 2020, Fernandes was voted the most influential Portuguese MEP of 2020.
