= Pedro Siza Vieira =

Portuguese lawyer and politician

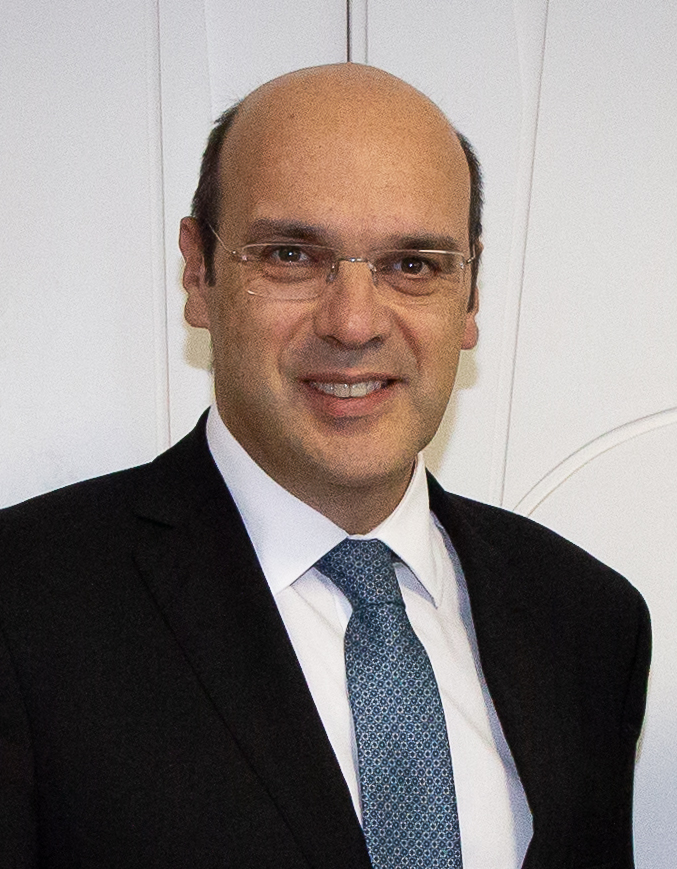
- Pedro Siza Vieira in June 2018

Minister of Economy and Digital Transition
- In office 15 October 2018 – 30 March 2022
- Prime Minister: António Costa
- Preceded by: Manuel Caldeira Cabral
- Succeeded by: António Costa Silva

Deputy Prime Minister
- In office 21 October 2017 – 30 March 2022
- Prime Minister: António Costa
- Preceded by: Eduardo Cabrita

Personal details
- Born: 14 July 1964 (age 62)
- Education: University of Lisbon

Pedro Siza Vieira (born 14 July 1964) is a Portuguese lawyer and politician who served as Deputy Prime Minister since 21 October 2017 and Minister of Economy since 15 October 2018 in the government of Prime Minister António Costa.

== Early life and education ==
Siza Vieira was born in Lisbon, where is father Antonio Carlos, a chemical engineer from Matosinhos, in the outskirts of Porto, was working at the time at CUF, a large industrial conglomerate. Siza's family returned to the north and lived in Matosinhos and Santo Tirso, where he completed his secondary education. Siza enrolled in the Law School of Coimbra University and completed his law degree from the Law School of the University of Lisbon.

== Career ==
Siza Vieira joined the government in 2017 from the law firm Linklaters. As a lawyer, he was a partner at Morais Leitão, J. Galvão Teles e Associados and a partner at Linklaters between 2002 and 2017, and as served as the Managing Partner of the firm's Lisbon office between 2006 and 2016.

As minister, Siza Vieira notably launched a 1.3 billion-euro ($1.5 billion) fund in 2021 to strengthen the capital of small and medium-sized companies hard hit by the COVID-19 pandemic in Portugal, mainly in the tourism and retail sectors.
