= Ana Abrunhosa =

Portuguese politician (born 1970)

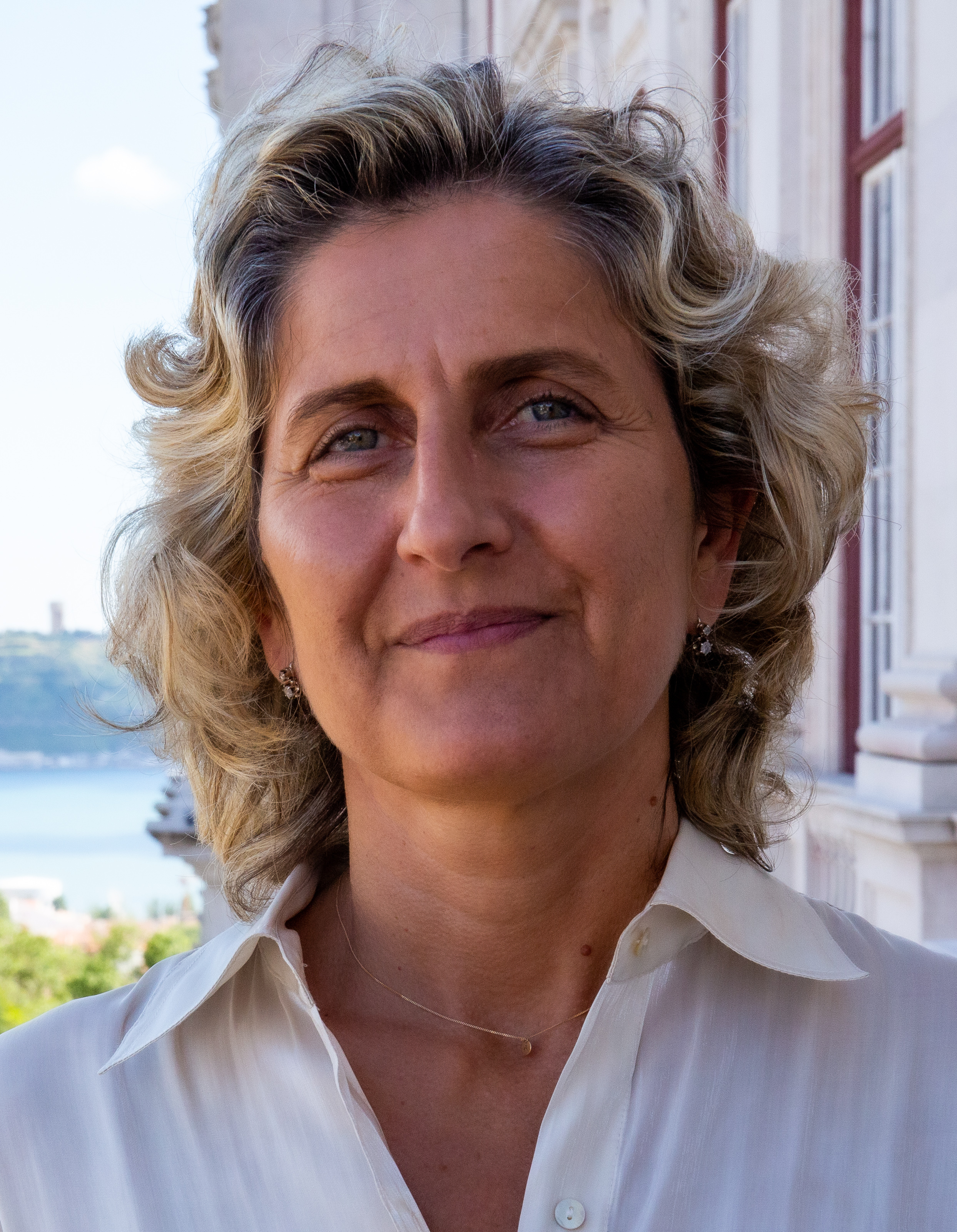
- Abrunhosa in 2020

Minister for Territorial Cohesion
- In office 26 October 2019 – 2 April 2024
- Prime Minister: António Costa
- Preceded by: Luís Marques Guedes (as Minister of the Presidency and Regional Development)
- Succeeded by: Manuel Castro Almeida (as Minister Adjunct and for Territorial Cohesion)

Member of the Assembly of the Republic
- In office 26 March 2024 – 18 May 2025
- Constituency: Coimbra

Member of the Mêda Municipal Assembly
- In office 29 September 2013 – May 2014

Personal details
- Born: Ana Maria Pereira Abrunhosa; 4 July 1970 (age 56) Portuguese Angola
- Citizenship: Portugal
- Party: Socialist Party (2019–present)
- Other political affiliations: Social Democratic Party (until 2019)
- Children: 2
- Education: University of Coimbra

Ana Maria Pereira Abrunhosa (born 4 July 1970) is a Portuguese economist and politician who served as minister for Territorial Cohesion from October 2019 to March 2024, when she was elected to the Assembly of the Republic of Portugal as a member of the Socialist Party (PS), representing the Coimbra constituency.

== Early life and career ==
Abrunhosa has a doctorate in economics from the Faculty of Economics of the University of Coimbra, and has taught several subjects there since 1995, such as microeconomics, regional economics, and European economics. She was also a researcher at the university's Centre for Social Studies.

== Political career ==
Politically unaffiliated, Abrunhosa had held public offices dealing with regional development and innovation management under both António Costa's centre-left government (Socialist Party) and the preceding Pedro Passos Coelho centre-right government (PSD).

Before becoming minister, among other positions, she was president of the Centro Regional Coordination and Development Commission (2014–2019), which, notably, coincided with the devastating June 2017 Portugal wildfires. She was also president of the management board of the Centro Regional Operational Programme (2014–2019), president of the Investment Committee of the Urban Instrument for Rehabilitation and Revitalisation (2016–2019), president of the General Council of the Debt & Guarantees Fund of the Financial Development Institution (2017–2018) and of the General Council of the Capital & Quasi-Capital Fund (2019), and president of the EuroACE Working Community and Euroregion (2018–2019).

Abrunhosa was a candidate for mayor of Coimbra as an independent supported by PS, PAN and Livre, in the 2025 local elections. On October 12, 2025, Abrunhosa won the elections, and she currently serves as the mayor of Coimbra.
