= Ministry of Economy and Territorial Cohesion =

Government ministry of Portugal responsible for economical and territorial matters

- Ministério da Economia e da Coesão Territorial
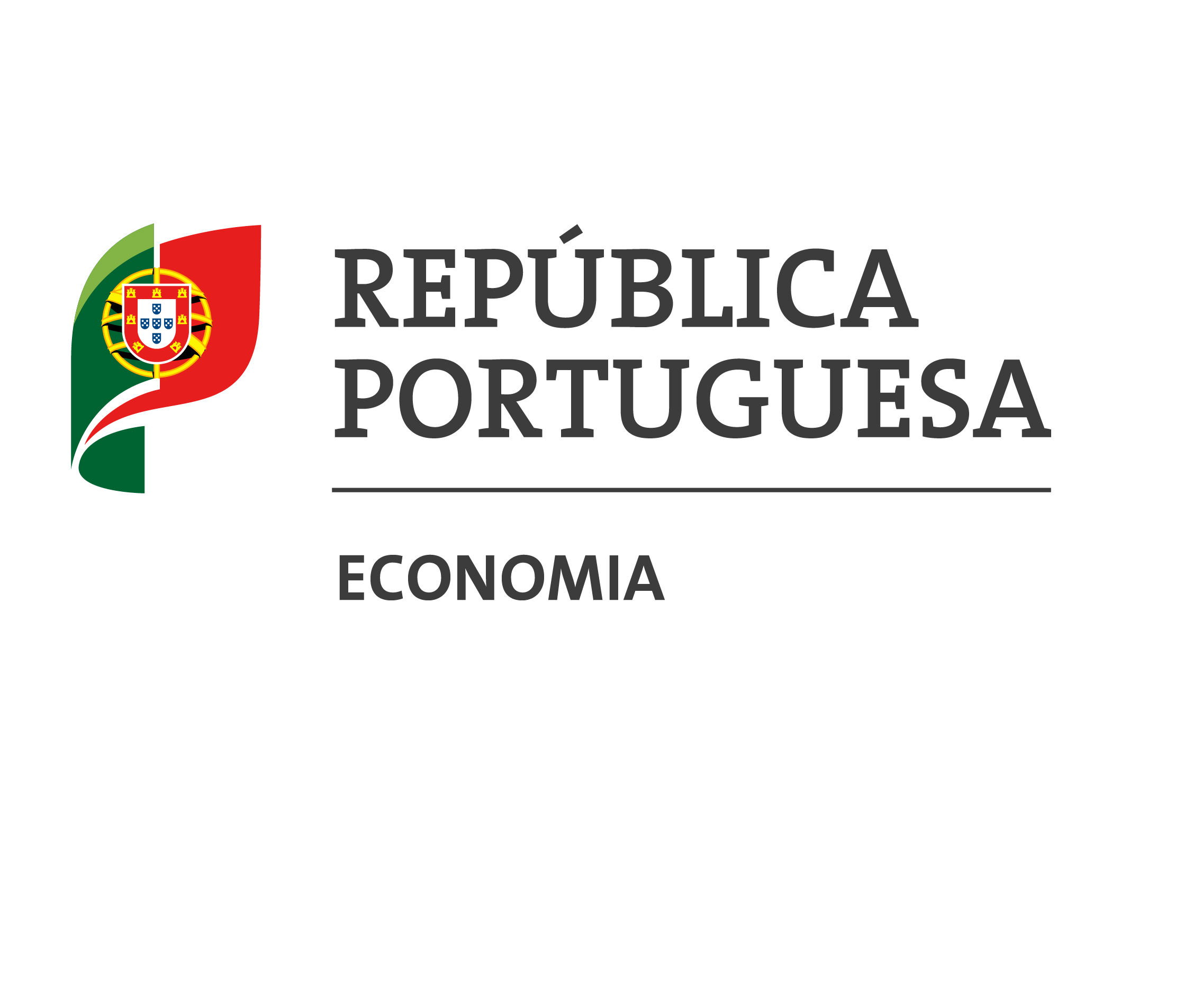

Ministry overview
- Formed: 2025
- Preceding agencies: Ministry of Economy; Ministry of Territorial Cohesion
- Jurisdiction: Government of Portugal
- Headquarters: Lisbon
- Minister responsible: Manuel Castro Almeida, Minister of Economy and Territorial Cohesion
- Website: portugal.gov.pt

The Ministry of Economy and Territorial Cohesion (Portuguese: Ministério da Economia e da Coesão Territorial) is a Portuguese government ministry. It was created in 2025 by the XXV Constitutional Government as a merger of the Ministry of Economy and Ministry of Territorial Cohesion.

It is responsible for overseeing and executing public policies related to economic activities (namely commerce, tourism, services and industry) and spatial planning.

== History ==
In Portugal, the first ministry specifically dedicated to managing economic affairs was the Ministry of Public Works, Commerce and Industry, created in 1852 by decree of Queen Maria II. From the 1910s onwards, matters relating to the various sectors of the economy were successively separated and brought together in different ministries.

Throughout the years, the Ministry has changed names and functions various times.

=== Timeline ===
- 1852 - Creation of the Ministry of Public Works, Commerce and Industry (MoPWCI), responsible for the trade, industry and agriculture sectors, as well as public works, transport and communications.
- 1910 - Following the 5 October Revolution, the MoPWCI is renamed to "Ministry of Development", retaining the same powers.
- 1917 - The MoD was renamed to "Ministry of Commerce", with the agricultural sector passing to the Ministry of Labour and Social Welfare.
- 1918 - The MoC was renamed to "Ministry of Commerce and Communications".
- 1932 - The Ministry of Commerce, Industry and Agriculture is created, as a result of the merger of the Ministries of Commerce and Communications and Agriculture.
- 1933 - The MoCIA is divided into the Ministry of Commerce and Industry and the Ministry of Agriculture.
- 1940 - The Ministries of Commerce and Industry and Agriculture are again merged into the Ministry of Economy, marking the first appearance of the designation.
- 1958 - The Secretariats of State for Trade, Industry and Agriculture are created and integrated into the ministry.
- May 1974 - Following the Carnation Revolution, the Ministry of Economy and the Ministry of Finance are merged into the Ministry of Economic Coordination.
- June 1974 - The merger is undone and the MoEC stops existing. The Ministry of the Navy is also dissolved, with the fisheries sector coming under the Ministry of Economy.
- 1975 - The MoE is divided into the Ministries of Foreign Trade, Domestic Trade, Agriculture and Fisheries and Industry and Technology.
- 1976 - The Ministries of Domestic Trade and Foreign Trade are merged into the Ministry of Trade and Tourism.
- 1979 - The Ministry of Industry and Technology is transformed into the Ministry of Industry.
- 1980 - The MoI is renamed to the "Ministry of Industry and Energy".
- 1981 - The Ministries of Trade and Tourism and Agriculture and Fisheries are merged into the Ministry of Agriculture, Trade and Fisheries.
- 1983 - The MoATF is split into the Ministries of Trade and Tourism and Agriculture, Forestry and Food, with the fisheries sector being transferred to the Ministry of the Sea.
- 1995 - The Ministries of Trade and Tourism and Industry and Energy are merged into the Ministry of Economy.
- 2004 - The Ministry of Economic Activities and Labour is created from the merger of the MoE and the labour section of the Ministry of Social Security and Labour. The tourism sector is transferred to the new Ministry of Tourism.
- 2005 - The MoEAL and MoT are merged into the Ministry of Economy and Innovation.
- 2009 - The MEI is renamed to "Ministry of Economy, Innovation and Development".
- 2011 - The MEID is integrated into the Ministry of Economy and Employment.
- 2013 - The Ministry of Economy is re-established, with the employment portfolio being transferred to the Ministry of Solidarity, Employment and Social Security.
- 2019 - The MoE is integrated into the Ministry of Economy and Digital Transition.
- 2022 - The structure of the MoE is integrated into the new Ministry of Economy and the Sea.
- 2024 - The MoES is once again renamed to "Ministry of Economy".
- 2025 - The MoE is merged with the Ministry of Territorial Cohesion, creating the Ministry of Economy and Territorial Cohesion.

== List of Ministers (since 1974) ==
Colour key
(for political parties)
Socialist Party (PS)
Social Democratic Party (PSD)
Democratic and Social Center (CDS)
Independent (Ind.)

#	Portrait	Name	Took office	Left office	Party	Prime Minister
1		Vasco Vieira de Almeida (b. 1932)	16 May 1974	17 July 1974	Ind.	Adelino da Palma Carlos
2		Emílio Rui Vilar (b. 1939)	17 July 1974	26 March 1975	Ind.	Vasco Gonçalves
3		Mário Murteira (1933–2013)	26 March 1975	19 September 1975	Ind.	Vasco Gonçalves
4		Joaquim Magalhães Mota (1935–2007)	19 September 1975	23 July 1976	PPD	José Pinheiro de Azevedo
4		Jorge Campinos (1937–1993)	19 September 1975	23 July 1976	PS	José Pinheiro de Azevedo
5		António Barreto (b. 1942)	23 July 1976	25 March 1977	PS	Mário Soares
6		Carlos Mota Pinto (1936–1985)	25 March 1977	30 January 1978	Ind.	Mário Soares
7		Basílio Horta (b. 1943)	30 January 1978	29 August 1978	CDS	Mário Soares
8		Pedro Pires de Miranda (1928–2015)	29 August 1978	22 November 1978	Ind.	Alfredo Nobre da Costa
9		Abel Repolho Correia (1926–1994)	22 November 1978	1 August 1979	Ind.	Carlos Mota Pinto
10		Acácio Pereira Magro (1932–2018)	1 August 1979	3 January 1980	Ind.	Maria Lourdes Pintasilgo
11		Basílio Horta (b. 1943)	3 January 1980	9 January 1981	CDS	Francisco Sá Carneiro
11		Basílio Horta (b. 1943)	3 January 1980	9 January 1981	CDS	Diogo Freitas do Amaral
12		Alexandre Vaz Pinto (b. 1939)	9 January 1981	4 September 1981	PSD	Francisco Pinto Balsemão
13		Basílio Horta (b. 1943)	4 September 1981	9 June 1983	CDS	Francisco Pinto Balsemão
14		Álvaro Barreto (1936–2020)	9 June 1983	17 October 1984	PSD	Mário Soares
15		Joaquim Ferreira do Amaral (b. 1945)	17 October 1984	6 November 1985	PSD	Mário Soares
16		Fernando Santos Martins (1930–2006)	6 November 1985	17 August 1987	PSD	Aníbal Cavaco Silva
17		Joaquim Ferreira do Amaral (b. 1945)	17 August 1987	24 April 1990	PSD	Aníbal Cavaco Silva
18		Fernando Faria de Oliveira (b. 1941)	24 April 1990	28 October 1995	PSD	Aníbal Cavaco Silva
19		Daniel Bessa (b. 1948)	28 October 1995	27 March 1996	PS	António Guterres
20		Augusto Mateus (b. 1950)	27 March 1996	25 November 1997	Ind.	António Guterres
21		Joaquim Pina Moura (1952–2020)	25 November 1997	14 September 2000	PS	António Guterres
22		Mário Cristina de Sousa (b. 1946)	14 September 2000	3 July 2001	Ind.	António Guterres
23		Luís Braga da Cruz (b. 1942)	3 July 2001	6 April 2002	PS	António Guterres
24		Carlos Tavares (b. 1953)	6 April 2002	17 July 2004	PSD	José Manuel Durão Barroso
25		Álvaro Barreto (1936–2020)	17 July 2004	12 March 2005	PSD	Pedro Santana Lopes
26		Manuel Pinho (b. 1954)	12 March 2005	6 July 2009	Ind.	José Sócrates
27		Fernando Teixeira dos Santos (b. 1951)	6 July 2009	26 October 2009	Ind.	José Sócrates
28		José António Vieira da Silva (b. 1953)	26 October 2009	21 June 2011	PS	José Sócrates
29		Álvaro Santos Pereira (b. 1972)	21 June 2011	24 July 2013	Ind.	Pedro Passos Coelho
30		António Pires de Lima (b. 1962)	24 July 2013	30 October 2015	CDS	Pedro Passos Coelho
31		Miguel Morais Leitão (b. 1964)	30 October 2015	26 November 2015	CDS	Pedro Passos Coelho
32		Manuel Caldeira Cabral (b. 1968)	26 November 2015	15 October 2018	Ind.	António Costa
33		Pedro Siza Vieira (b. 1964)	15 October 2018	30 March 2022	Ind.	António Costa
34		António Costa e Silva (b. 1952)	30 March 2022	2 April 2024	Ind.	António Costa
35		Pedro Reis (b. 1967)	2 April 2024	5 June 2025	PSD	Luís Montenegro
36		Manuel Castro Almeida (b. 1957)	5 June 2025	Incumbent	PSD	Luís Montenegro
