= Ministry of Territorial Cohesion =

Government ministry of Portugal

- Ministério da Coesão Territorial
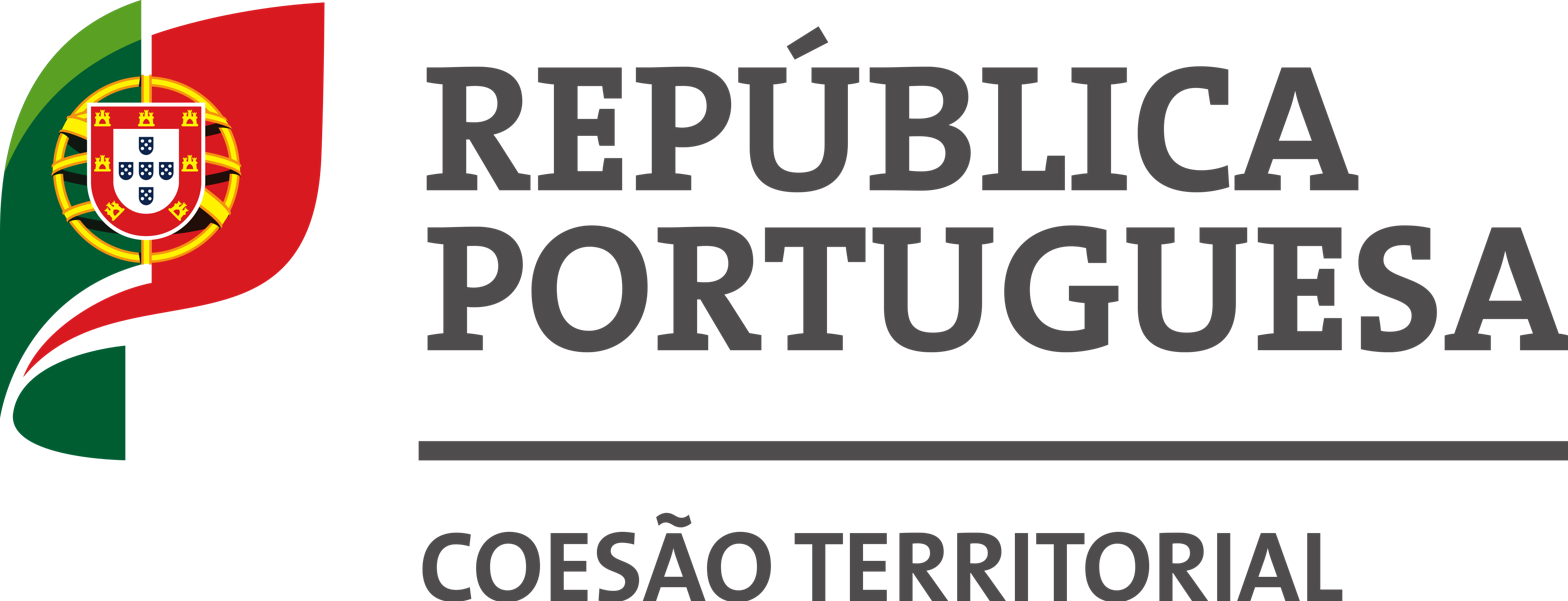

Ministry overview
- Formed: 2019
- Dissolved: 2025
- Superseding Ministry: Ministry of Economy and Territorial Cohesion
- Jurisdiction: Government of Portugal
- Minister responsible: Minister of Territorial Cohesion

The Ministry of Territorial Cohesion (Portuguese: Ministério da Coesão Territorial) was a Portuguese government ministry responsible for a balanced regional development and for the reduction of regional economic disparities, as well as cooperating with the regional policy of the European Union.

The Ministry was created in 2019, in António Costa's XXII Constitutional Government. In previous cabinets, the regional development sector was usually the responsibility of the Minister of the Presidency, of the Minister of Economy, or of the Minister of Environment.

In June 2025, the Ministry was merged with the Ministry of Economy by the XXV Constitutional Government, creating the Ministry of Economy and Territorial Cohesion.

== List of Ministers ==
Colour key
(for political parties)
Socialist Party (PS)
Social Democratic Party (PSD)

#	Portrait	Name	Took office	Left office	Party	Prime Minister
1		José Luís Arnaut (b. 1963)	17 July 2004	12 March 2005	PSD	Pedro Santana Lopes
2		Francisco Nunes Correia (b. 1951)	12 March 2005	26 October 2009	PS	José Sócrates
3		José Vieira da Silva (b. 1953)	26 October 2009	21 June 2011	PS	José Sócrates
–	Vacant office		21 June 2011	13 April 2013		Pedro Passos Coelho
4		Miguel Poiares Maduro (b. 1967)	13 April 2013	30 October 2015	PSD	Pedro Passos Coelho
5		Luís Marques Guedes (b. 1957)	30 October 2015	26 November 2015	PSD	Pedro Passos Coelho
–	Vacant office		26 November 2015	26 October 2019		António Costa
6		Ana Abrunhosa (b. 1970)	26 October 2019	2 April 2024	PS	António Costa
7		Manuel Castro Almeida (b. 1957)	2 April 2024	present	PSD	Luís Montenegro
