= Ministry of Agriculture (Portugal) =

Government ministry of Portugal

Ministry of Agriculture and Fisheries
- Ministério da Agricultura e Pesca
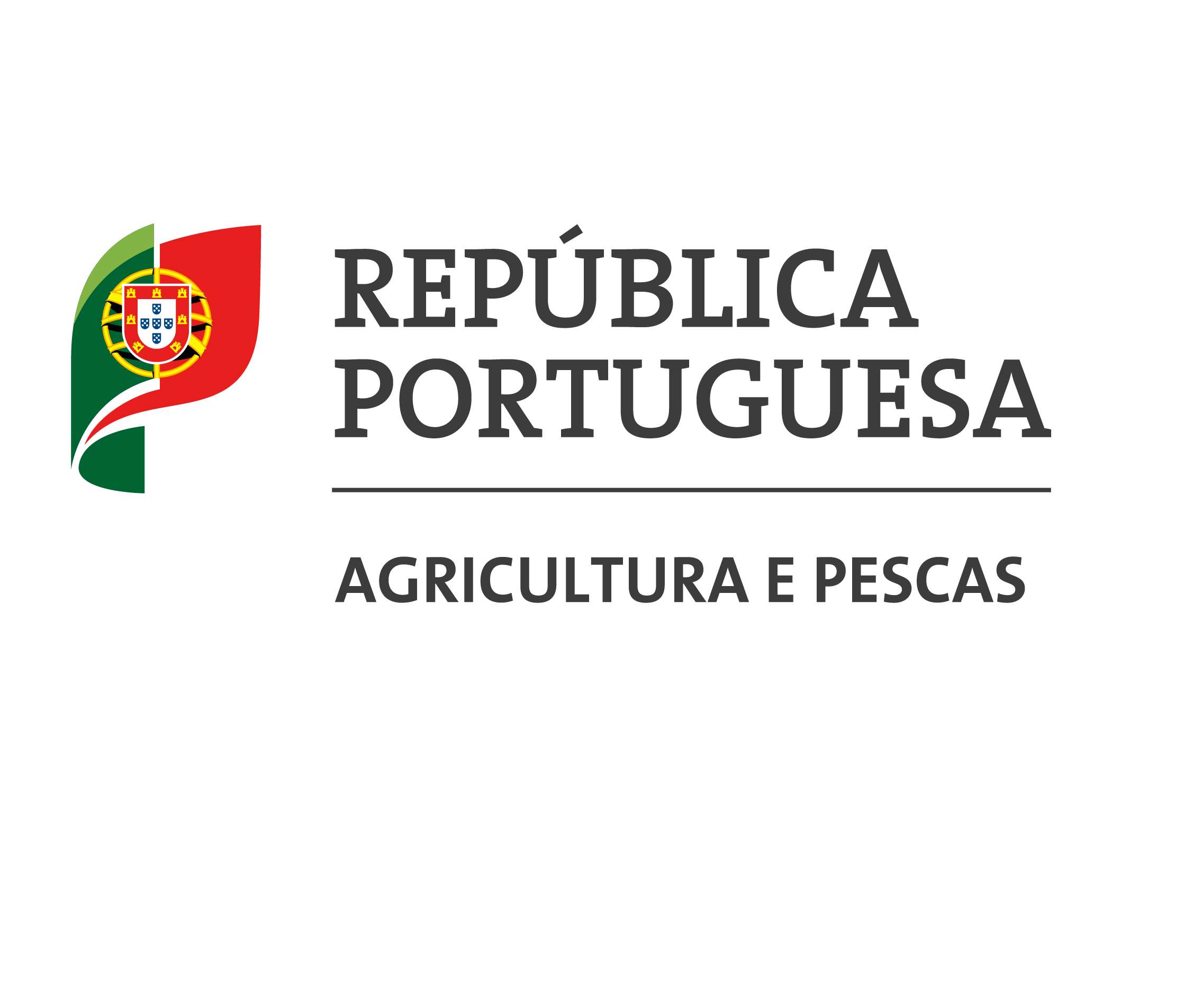

Ministry overview
- Formed: 1918
- Jurisdiction: Government of Portugal
- Minister responsible: José Manuel Fernandes, Minister of Agriculture and Fisheries
- Website: www.min-agricultura.pt

The Ministry of Agriculture and Fisheries (Portuguese: Ministério da Agricultura e Pesca) is a Portuguese government ministry.

== History ==
The Ministry of Agriculture was first created in 1918. Since then, it has been restructured, extinguished and reestablished several times, under various designations:

- 1918 – Ministry of Agriculture (Ministério da Agricultura)
- 1932 – Ministry of Commerce, Industry and Agriculture (Ministério do Comércio, Indústria e Agricultura)
- 1933 – Ministry of Agriculture (Ministério da Agricultura)
- 1940 – Undersecretariat of State for Agriculture (Subsecretariado de Estado da Agricultura), a division of the Ministry of Economy
- 1958 – Secretariat of State for Agriculture (Secretaria de Estado da Agricultura), a division of the Ministry of Economy
- 1974 – Ministry of Agriculture and Commerce (Ministério da Agricultura e Comércio)
- 1974 – Secretariat of State for Agriculture (Secretaria de Estado da Agricultura), a division of the Ministry of Economic Coordination
- 1974 – Secretariat of State for Agriculture (Secretaria de Estado da Agricultura), a division of the Ministry of Economy
- 1975 – Ministry of Agriculture and Fisheries (Ministério da Agricultura e Pescas)
- 1981 – Ministry of Agriculture, Commerce and Fisheries (Ministério da Agricultura, Comércio e Pescas)
- 1986 – Ministry of Agriculture, Fisheries and Food (Ministério da Agricultura, Pescas e Alimentação)
- 1991 – Ministry of Agriculture (Ministério da Agricultura); the fisheries sector transfers to the Ministry of Maritime Affairs
- 1993 – Ministry of Agriculture, Forestry and Food (Ministério da Agricultura, Florestas e Alimentação); the fisheries sector transfers to the Ministry of the Sea
- 1995 – Ministry of Agriculture, Rural Development and Fisheries (Ministério da Agricultura, do Desenvolvimento Rural e das Pescas)
- 2004 – Ministry of Agriculture, Fisheries and Forestry (Ministério da Agricultura, Pescas e Florestas)
- 2005 – Ministry of Agriculture, Rural Development and Fisheries (Ministério da Agricultura, do Desenvolvimento Rural e das Pescas)
- 2011 – Ministry of Agriculture, the Sea, the Environment, and Spatial Planning (Ministério da Agricultura, do Mar, do Ambiente e do Ordenamento do Território)
- 2013 – Ministry of Agriculture and the Sea (Ministério da Agricultura e do Mar)
- 2015 – Ministry of Agriculture, Forestry and Rural Development (Ministério da Agricultura, Florestas e Desenvolvimento Rural; the fisheries sector transfers to the Ministry of Maritime Affairs
- 2019 – Ministry of Agriculture (Ministério da Agricultura)
- 2022 – Ministry of Agriculture and Food (Ministério da Agricultura e Alimentação)
- 2024 – Ministry of Agriculture and Fisheries (Ministério da Agricultura e Pesca)
