= Ministry of Education (Portugal) =

- Ministério da Educação
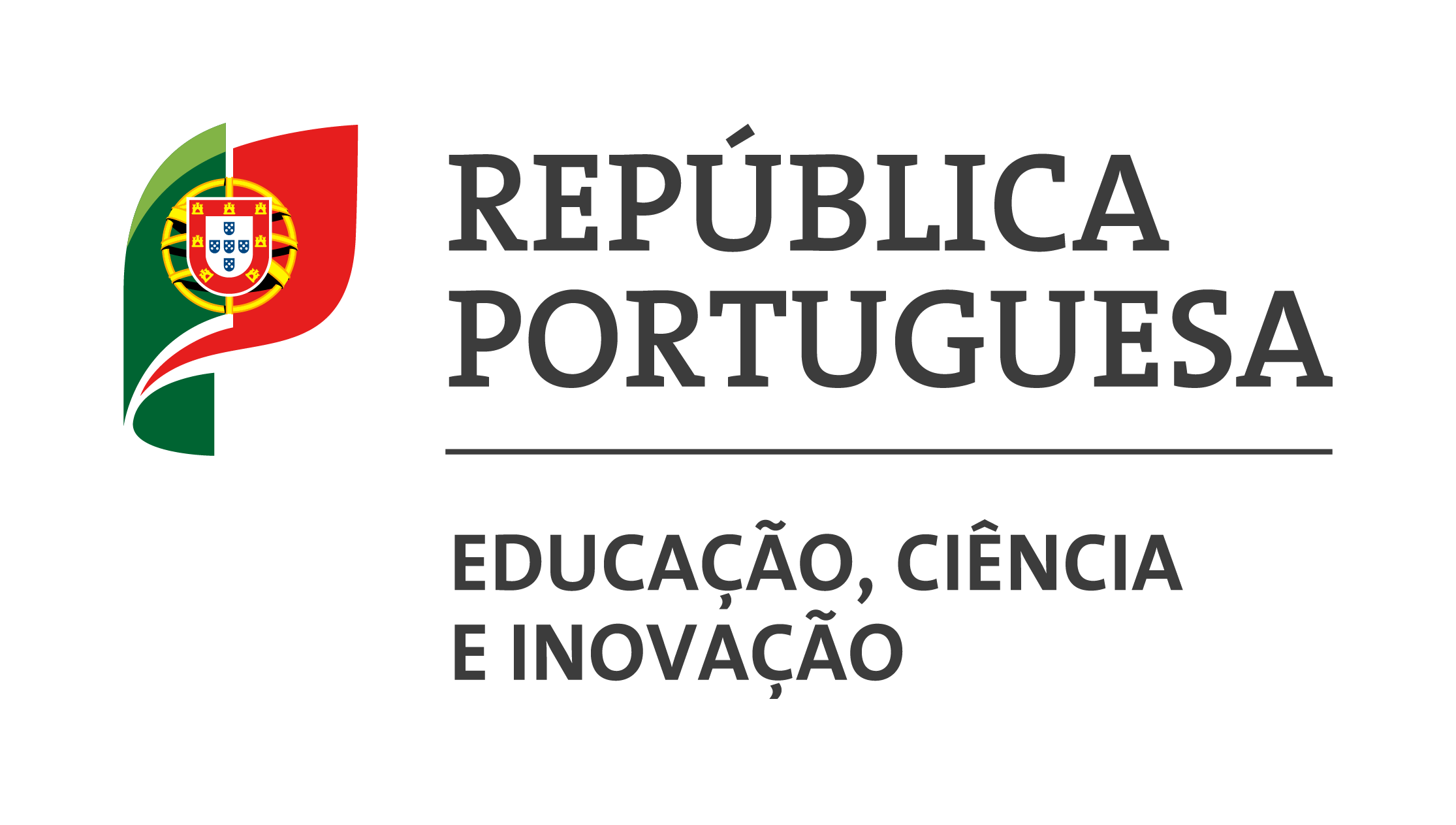
- logo

Ministry overview
- Formed: 1913 (113 years ago)
- Jurisdiction: Government of Portugal
- Headquarters: Lisbon, Portugal
- Minister responsible: Fernando Alexandre, Minister of Education, Science and Innovation
- Website: www.min-edu.pt

The Ministry of Education (Portuguese: Ministério da Educação or ME), is a Portuguese government ministry,.

== History and operations ==
The ministry was established on 1913, and is headquartered in Liabon.

== See also ==
- Education in Portugal
- National Council for Education in Portugal
- List of education ministries
