= Ministry of the Sea (Portugal) =

Government ministry of Portugal

- Ministério do Mar

Ministry overview
- Formed: 1983
- Jurisdiction: Government of Portugal
- Minister responsible: José Manuel Fernandes, Minister of Agriculture and Sea

The Ministry of the Sea (Portuguese: Ministério do Mar) is a Portuguese government ministry. The Ministry of the Sea is responsible for the coordination of maritime policy, and deals with such aspects as fisheries, the merchant navy, exploitation of marine resources, regulation of marine conservation, planning, scientific research and technological development related to the oceans, promotion of an effective presence in territorial waters, as well as national participation in European and international bodies responsible for the design and monitoring of maritime policies.
