= Portugal's list of tax havens =

Ministral Order n. 150/2004

Ministry of Finance
- Long title: Ministral Order n. 150/2004 - Approves a list of countries, territories and regions with privileged tax regimes which are clearly more favorable
- Territorial extent: Portugal
- Enacted by: Portugal's Ministry of Finance
- Signed by: Vasco Jorge Valdez Ferreira Matias
- Commenced: February 13, 2004
- Administered by: Portuguese Tax and Customs Authority

Amends
- Ministerial Order n.150/2004 Ministerial Order n. 292/2011; Ministerial Order n. 345-A/2016; Ministerial Order n. 309-A/2020

Related legislation
- Personal Income Tax Code; Corporate Income Tax Code; Municipal Property Tax Code; Municipal Property Transfer Tax Code; Stamp Duty Tax Code; Tax Benefits Statutes

Summary
- Approves the official list for legal and tax purposes of jurisdictions deemed as tax havens.

Keywords
- Tax Havens, Offshore Financial Centre
- Status: In force

Under Ministerial Order n. 150/2004 of 13 February, issued by the Portuguese Ministry of Finance and consequently updated, Portugal defines an official blacklist of countries and jurisdictions considered for legal and tax purposes as tax havens.

== Blacklisted Jurisdictions ==
=== Current Blacklisted Jurisdictions ===
Blacklisted Jurisdiction	Type	Notes
Anguilla	British Overseas Territory	-
Antigua and Barbuda	Country	-
Netherlands Antilles	Constituent Country	The Netherlands Antilles were dissolved in 2010.
Aruba	Constituent Country	-
Saint Helena, Ascension and Tristan da Cunha	British Overseas Territory	-
Bahamas	Country	
Bahrain	Country	Portugal has signed an Agreement to Avoid Double Taxation with the country.
Barbados	Country	Portugal has signed an Agreement to Avoid Double Taxation with the country.
Belize	Country	-
Bolivia	Country	-
Brunei	Country	-
Costa Rica	Country	-
Fiji	Country	-
Maldives	Country	-
Northern Mariana Islands	Commonwealth	-
Marshall Islands	Country	-
Mauritius	Country	-
Monaco	Country	-
Christmas Island	Australian external territory	-
Palau	Country	-
Solomon Islands	Country	-
Svalbard and Jan Mayen	Unincorporated internal area of Norway	Portugal has signed an Agreement to Avoid Double Taxation with the country but the agreement does not include these territories.
Turks and Caicos Islands	British Overseas Territory	-
British Virgin Islands	British Overseas Territory	-
United States Virgin Islands	Unincorporated and organized U.S. territory	-
Jamaica	Country	-
Jordan	Country	-
Kuwait	Country	Portugal has signed an Agreement to Avoid Double Taxation with the country.
Djibouti	Country	-
Dominica	Country	-
United Arab Emirates	Country	Portugal has signed an Agreement to Avoid Double Taxation with the country.
Gambia	Country	-
Gibraltar	British Overseas Territory	Portugal has signed an agreement of exchange of tax information with the territory.
Grenada	Country	-
Guyana	Country	-
Honduras	Country	-
Guam	Unincorporated and organized U.S. territory	Portugal has signed an Agreement to Avoid Double Taxation with the country.
Kiribati	Country	-
Isle of Man	Crown dependency	Portugal has signed an agreement of exchange of tax information with the territory. The Isle of Man was briefly whitelisted between January 1, 2017 and December 31, 2018.
Niue	Country	-
Pitcairn Islands	British Overseas Territory	-
Iran (Qeshm Island)	County	Only the county of Qeshm, more specifically the island of Qeshm has been blacklisted by the Portuguese government.
Saint Pierre and Miquelon	Overseas collectivity of France	Portugal has signed an Agreement to Avoid Double Taxation with the country but the agreement does not include this territory.
Tokelau	Dependent territory of New Zealand	-
Norfolk Island	Australian external territory	-
Labuan	Malaysian Federal Territory	-
Lebanon	Country	-
Liberia	Country	-
Mauritius	Country	-
Monaco	Country	-
Montserrat	British Overseas Territory	-
Nauru	Country	-
Panama	Country	-
French Polynesia	Overseas country and collectivity of France	Portugal has signed an Agreement to Avoid Double Taxation with the country but the agreement does not include this territory.
Puerto Rico	U.S. Commonwealth and Unincorporated and organized U.S. territory	Portugal has signed an Agreement to Avoid Double Taxation with the country.
Qatar	Country	Portugal has signed an Agreement to Avoid Double Taxation with the country.
Yemen	Country	-
Vanuatu	Country	-
American Samoa	Unincorporated and unorganized U.S. territory	Portugal has signed an Agreement to Avoid Double Taxation with the country.
Samoa	Country	-
Saint Lucia	Country	-
Saint Kitts and Nevis	Country	-
San Marino	Country	Portugal has signed an Agreement to Avoid Double Taxation with the country.
Tuvalu	Country	-
Bermuda	British Overseas Territory	Portugal has signed an agreement of exchange of tax information with the territory.
Cayman Islands	British Overseas Territory	Portugal has signed an agreement of exchange of tax information with the territory.
Cocos (Keeling) Islands	Australian external territory	-
Cook Islands	Country	-
Guernsey	Bailiwick	Portugal has signed an agreement of exchange of tax information with the territory.
Jersey	Bailiwick	Portugal has signed an agreement of exchange of tax information with the territory.
Other Pacific Islands	Non-specified	The Portuguese Government considered "other Pacific Islands" all the islands in the Pacific Ocean not mentioned in the list.
Falkland Islands	British Overseas Territory	-
Saint Vincent and the Grenadines	Country	-
Seychelles	Country	-
Eswatini	Country	-
Oman	Country	Portugal has signed an Agreement to Avoid Double Taxation with the country.
Tonga	Country	-
Trinidad and Tobago	Country	-

=== Former Blacklisted Jurisdictions ===
Jurisdiction	Type	Date of Whitelisting	Notes
Andorra	Country	January 1, 2021	Portugal has signed an agreement of exchange of tax information and an Agreement to Avoid Double Taxation, in force since April 23, 2017, with Andorra. The Government of the Principality of Andorra sent a formal request under Article 63d(3) of the Portuguese General Taxation Law to review the country's place on the Portuguese blacklist, which was then subject of a positive opinion issued by the Portuguese Tax and Customs Authority, and the conditions for excluding the Principality of Andorra from the blacklisted were approved by the Ministry of Finance.
Cyprus	EU Member State	November 9, 2011	Portugal has signed an agreement of exchange of tax information and an Agreement to Avoid Double Taxation, in force since August 16, 2013, with Cyprus. Under EU Law Portugal could not discriminate fellow Member-States nor prevent the free movement of capital.
Luxembourg	EU Member State	November 9, 2011	Portugal has signed an agreement of exchange of tax information and an Agreement to Avoid Double Taxation, in force since August 16, 2013, with Cyprus. Under EU Law Portugal could not discriminate fellow Member-States nor prevent the free movement of capital.
Hong Kong, China	Special Administrative Region	January 1, 2026	Removed from the list because it is not on the European Union list of non-cooperative jurisdictions for tax purposes adopted by the Council of the European Union, which was last updated on February 18, 2025.
Uruguay	Country	January 1, 2026	Removed from the list because it is not on the European Union list of non-cooperative jurisdictions for tax purposes adopted by the Council of the European Union, which was last updated on February 18, 2025.
Liechtenstein	EFTA Member	January 1, 2026	Removed from the list because it is not on the European Union list of non-cooperative jurisdictions for tax purposes adopted by the Council of the European Union, which was last updated on February 18, 2025.

== Sanctions ==
=== National sanctions ===
The Portuguese Tax Code foresees aggravated withholding tax, 35% tax rate, on capital income (interests and dividends) deriving from black listed jurisdictions and an aggravated municipal property tax of 7% on property owned by entities located in said jurisdiction. Portugal's "blacklist" is defined by decree issued by the Minister of Finance and taking into account confidential reports issued by the Portuguese Tax and Customs Authority.

In addition, non-habitual residents (NHRs) status holders do not benefit from personal income tax exemption on interests, dividends, capital gains, income from immovable property (rents), royalties, intellectual property income and business income) if: these are sourced from black-listed jurisdictions. Therefore, taxation of such income will be subject to the normal rates or to the 35% rate depending on the type of income earned by the NHR status holder.

=== European Union Sanctions ===
On December 16, 2019, the EU Code of Conduct Group (Business Taxation) (CCG), under the Economic and Financial Affairs Council, published a new guidance on sanctions to be applied by EU Member States against blacklisted 'non-cooperative' jurisdictions by the end of 2020. These sanctions were immediately backed by the Finish Presidency of the Council of the European Union who labelled them as "defensive-measures" that are recommended to EU Member States to take against blacklisted jurisdictions. Implementation of such sanctions by Portugal are expected to occur on January 1, 2021.

== Jurisprudence ==
=== Arbitration Court ===
A recent ruling from the Portuguese Arbitration Court (CAAD) in case 494/2024-T has challenged Portugal’s approach to taxing capital gains for non-residents from jurisdictions listed on the country's tax "blacklist." The case involved taxpayers residing in the United Arab Emirates (UAE) who were subjected to a higher 35% tax rate on real estate capital gains, in contrast to the lower rate applicable to other non-residents.

The court ruled that this differential tax treatment violates the principle of free movement of capital as established in Article 63 of the Treaty on the Functioning of the European Union. The decision highlighted several key points:

- Residency in a blacklisted jurisdiction does not automatically justify increased taxation.
- Blanket tax measures aimed at preventing tax avoidance can be excessive and restrict the free movement of capital.
- Portugal has a tax treaty with the UAE, including an exchange of information clause, which weakens the justification for imposing a higher tax rate.

As a result, the Arbitration Court annulled the 35% tax rate and ruled that the affected taxpayers were entitled to a refund, including interest on the excess tax paid.

== Criticism ==
The list has been said to have violated EU Law by discriminating against a former EU-Member State's territory such as Gibraltar, therefore violating the principle of free movement of capital. Furthermore, the list does not take into account whether Portugal has in place a double taxation agreement with the blacklisted territory.

Critics also point out that the list is not clear given the fact that it makes no provisions regarding the dissolution of the Netherlands Antilles nor if countries such as Japan, Australia or New Zealand fall under the category of "other Pacific Islands." In addition, the Portuguese list does not mirror the list adopted by the European Union regarding tax aggressive and non-cooperative jurisdictions.
