= Maria Luís Albuquerque =

Portuguese politician (born 1967)

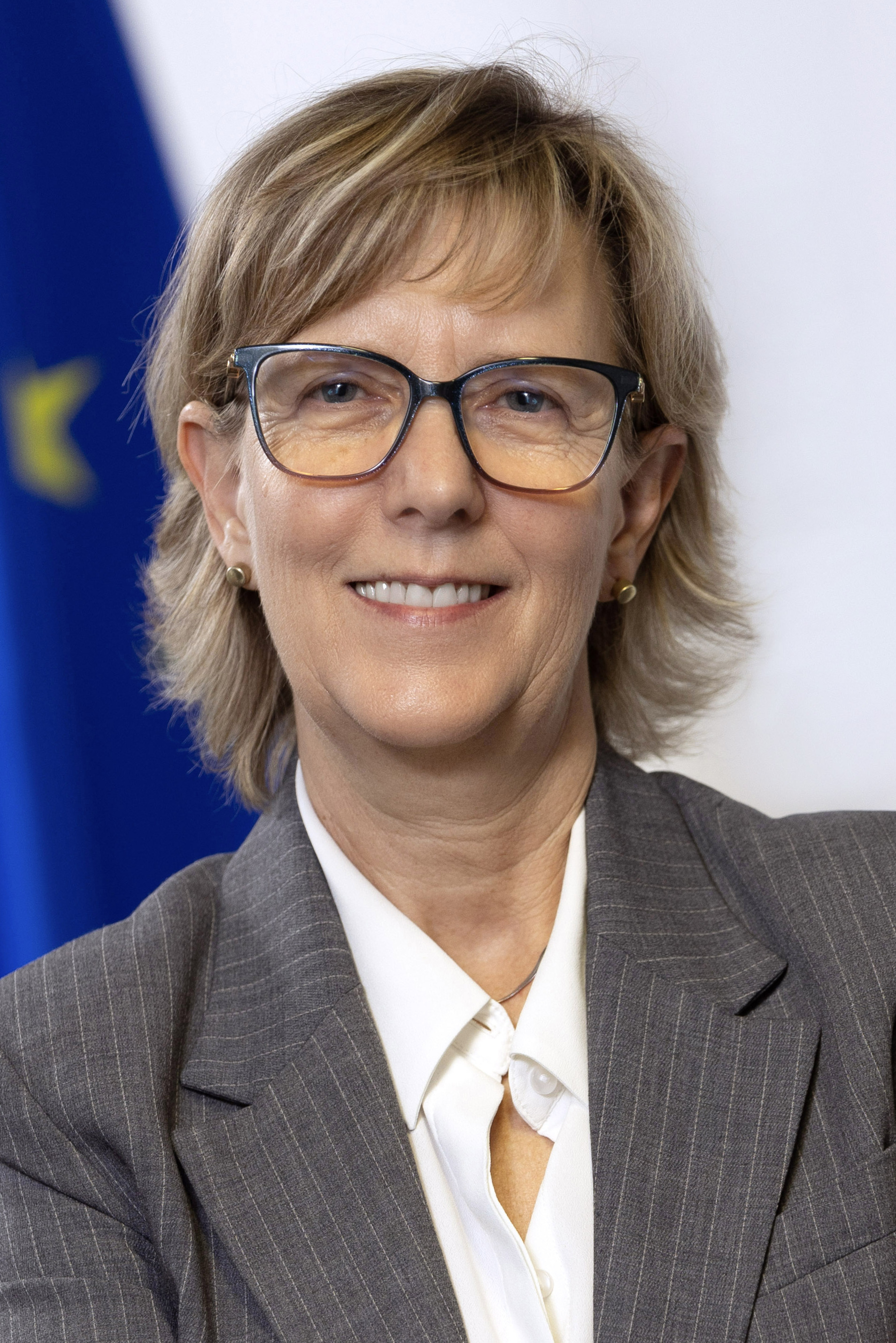
- Official portrait, 2024

European Commissioner for Financial Services and the Savings and Investments Union
- Incumbent
- Assumed office 1 December 2024
- Commission: Von der Leyen II
- Preceded by: Mairead McGuinness

Minister of Finance
- In office 2 July 2013 – 26 November 2015
- Prime Minister: Pedro Passos Coelho
- Preceded by: Vítor Gaspar
- Succeeded by: Mário Centeno
Junior ministerial offices
Secretary of State for the Treasury
In office 26 October 2012 – 2 July 2013
Prime Minister	Pedro Passos Coelho
Preceded by	Herself as Secretary of State for the Treasury and Finance
Succeeded by	Joaquim Pais Jorge
Secretary of State for the Treasury and Finance
In office 28 June 2011 – 27 February 2012
Prime Minister	Pedro Passos Coelho
Preceded by	Carlos Pina
Succeeded by	Herself as Secretary of State for the Treasury; Manuel Rodrigues as Secretary of State for Finance
Parliamentary offices
Member of the Assembly of the Republic
In office 2 July 2013 – 24 October 2019
Constituency	Setúbal
In office 27 February 2012 – 26 October 2012
Constituency	Setúbal
In office 20 June 2011 – 28 June 2011
Constituency	Setúbal
Member of the Almada Municipal Assembly
In office 1 October 2017 – 26 September 2021

Personal details
- Born: Maria Luís Casanova Morgado Dias; 16 September 1967 (age 58) Braga, Portugal
- Party: Social Democratic Party
- Spouse: António Albuquerque
- Children: 3
- Education: Lusíada University; Technical University of Lisbon
- Occupation: Economist; politician; professor

Maria Luís Casanova Morgado Dias de Albuquerque (European Portuguese pronunciation: [mɐˈɾi.ɐ luˈiz alβuˈkɛɾkɨ]; born 16 September 1967) is a Portuguese politician who is the European Commissioner for Financial Services and the Savings and Investments Union under the Second Von der Leyen Commission. She served as Minister of State and Finance between 2013 and 2015.

== Early life and education ==
Albuquerque is married and has three children. She graduated in economics in 1991 from Universidade Lusíada, in Lisbon, and holds a Master's degree (1997) in Monetary and Financial Economics from ISEG, Technical University of Lisbon.

== Early career ==
Albuquerque worked at the Directorate General of Treasury from 1996 to 1999; at the office of Higher Technical Studies and Economic Forecasts of the Ministry of Economy from 1999 to 2001 and as an advisor to the Secretary of State for the Treasury and Finance in 2001. Between 2001 and 2007 she was director of the Department of Financial Management of REFER, the railway infrastructure public company. From 2007 to 2011 she was head of Issuing and Markets Department at the Portuguese Debt Management Agency. She was a lecturer at Universidade Lusíada between 1991 and 2006.

== Political career ==
At the XIX Constitutional Government, Maria Luís Albuquerque became Secretary of State for the Treasury and Finance between June 2011 and October 2012 and Secretary of State for the Treasury between October 2012 and June 2013. In such capacity, she followed Eurogroup and Ecofin matters as alternate to the then Minister of State and Finance.

=== Minister of Finance (2013–2015) ===
Albuquerque's appointment was followed by the resignation of the former Minister of Foreign Affairs, Paulo Portas, who had openly criticized her nomination. Questions were raised after she denied that the Government had been informed about "swap" operations performed under the Government of Prime Minister José Sócrates, while the former minister of finance, Vitor Gaspar, admitted that he had been informed. She is only the second woman to hold the office of finance minister in Portugal, after Manuela Ferreira Leite.

As finance minister, Albuquerque supported the reform program advocated by Portugal's creditors and put in place by Gaspar. In January 2015, she announced that Portugal would follow Ireland with an early repayment of bailout loans from the International Monetary Fund after borrowing costs fell and the country was able to sell 30-year bonds. At the time, Portugal's economy was growing again after a three-year recession caused by a debt crisis and austerity.

Also, Albuquerque bolstered Portugal's bank resolution fund (Fundo de Resolução) in 2014 by earmarking 5.4 billion euros in Treasury loans. In early August 2014, she spent 4.9 billion euros to rescue Banco Espírito Santo, the country's second-largest lender, mostly from public funds. The bank was split into a regular bank called Novo Banco and a "bad bank" that inherited unserviced debt.

Following the 2014 European elections, it was believed that Passos Coelho was going to nominate Luís Albuquerque as Portugal's member of the European Commission, a job that eventually went to Carlos Moedas. At the time, there was speculation in the Portuguese press that Luís Albuquerque was not nominated because Jean-Claude Juncker would not guarantee her a weighty portfolio in the commission.

== Life after politics ==
Following her party's defeat after the 2015 national elections where it won the single largest vote with 38.6% securing almost 47% of the seats in the Assembly before a left-wing coalition has risen to power, Luís Albuquerque left her office as finance minister but stayed on as a member of parliament until 2019

In June 2016, Luís Albuquerque made headlines when she wrote in an article published in business daily Jornal de Negócios that "it is public knowledge that Caixa Geral de Depósitos (CGD) granted large loans in the past, without sufficient guarantees and using practices that are difficult to justify to the public interest." Shortly after, Portugal's government ordered an independent audit of the country's largest bank, state-owned CGD.

In 2021, Luís Albuquerque was the Portuguese government's candidate to become the chair of the European Securities and Markets Authority; however, she lost out in a distant third place to Verena Ross.

== Other activities ==
=== International organizations ===
- African Development Bank, ex-officio member of the board of governors (2013–2015)
- European Stability Mechanism, ex-officio member of the board of governors (2013–2015)
- European Investment Bank, ex-officio member of the board of governors (2013–2015)

=== Corporate boards ===
- Morgan Stanley Europe, independent non-executive member of the board of directors (since 2022)
- Arrow Global, independent non-executive member of the board of directors (2016–2021)

Political offices
Preceded by Vítor Gaspar	Minister of Finance; 2013–2015	Succeeded by Mário Centeno
