= Non-Habitual Resident =

Status in Portuguese tax law

Decree-Law n. 249/2009

Government of Portugal
- Long title: Tax Code for Investment
- Territorial extent: Portugal
- Enacted: 16 July 2009
- Assented to: 11 September 2009
- Signed by: Aníbal Cavaco Silva
- Commenced: 1 January 2009
- Administered by: Ministry of Finance; Portuguese Tax and Customs Authority

Amends
- 2020 Portuguese State Budget Law

Related legislation
- Corporate Income Tax Code; Personal Income Tax Code

Summary
- Creates the Investment Promotion Tax Code

Keywords
- Income Tax
- Status: In force

The tax regime for non-habitual residents (commonly known as NHRs or NHR Tax Regime), formally known as non-regular residents, was created with the approval of the Investment Tax Code, approved by Decree-Law n. 249/2009, of 23 September. It changed the rules of the Portuguese Personal Income Tax, by granting a set of tax exemptions and flat rate taxation for a period of 10 years, in order to attract to Portugal, expat professionals qualified in activities with high added value or intellectual, industrial or know-how, as well as pensioners and other passive income earners.

== Tax benefits ==
Under the initial rules set in the NHR regime the following tax rates applied, in Portugal, to the income of those duly enrolled in it:

| Types of Income | Taxation in Portugal on Income of national Source | Taxation in Portugal on Income from Foreign Source until 2020 | Taxation in Portugal on Income from Foreign Source after 2020 | Taxation In Portugal on Income from Blacklisted Jurisdictions |
|---|---|---|---|---|
| Pensions | Up to 48% | 0% | 10% | 10% |
| Employment Income from High-Added Value Activities | 20% | 0% | 0% | 20% |
| Employment Income | Up to 48% | 0% | 0% | 0% |
| Business or Professional Income from High-Added Value Activities | 20% | 20% | 20% | 20% |
| Business of Professional Income | Up to 48% | 0% | 0% | Up to 48% |
| Intellectual or Industrial Property Income | 16,5% or 28% | 0% | 0% | 16,5% or 28% |
| Capital Income | 28% | 0% | 0% | 35% |
| Rental Income | 25% | 0% | 0% | 25% |
| Capital Gains (Shares) | 28% | 0% | 0% | 28% |
| Capital Gains (Real Estate) | 14,5% - 28% | 0% | 0% | 14,5% - 28% |
| Trusts | 28% | 0% | 0% | 35% |

=== Critics and reform ===
The above rules allowed for the double non-taxation on pensions, specially for those sourced in Scandinavian countries, such as Finland and Sweden, and in France. This situation lead to Finland and Sweden to revoke their taxation agreements with Portugal.

With the approval of the 2020 State Budget Law, by the Assembly of the Republic, the Portuguese Government addressed the vocal critics of other EU-Member States by implementing changes to the regime, namely regarding pension income.

=== High Added Value-Activities ===
| High-Added Values Activities until 2019 | High-Added Values Activities after 2019 |
|---|---|
| Architects | Directors-General or Executive Directors |
| Engineers | Administrative Services or Commercial Directors |
| Geologists | Specialized Services or Production Directors |
Theater, dance, cinema, radio and TV artists
Singers
Sculptors
Musicians
Paintors
| Auditors | Intermediate science and engineering technicians and professions |
| Tax consultants | Market-oriented farmers and skilled agricultural and livestock workers |
Dentists
Medical Doctors
University Professors
| Psychologists | Skilled workers in industry, construction and craftsmen, including in particular skilled workers in metallurgy, metalworking, food processing, wood, clothing, crafts, printing, manufacturing precision instruments, jewelers, artisans, electricity workers and in electronics. |
| Archeologists | Plant and machine operators and assembly workers, namely fixed plant and machine operators. Workers in the professional activities referred to above must have at least level 4 of qualification in the European Qualifications Framework or level 35 of the International Standard Classification of Education or have five years of duly proven professional experience. |
| Biologists and Life Sciences experts | N/A |
IT Programmers and consultants
| Managers and operators of computer equipment | Administrators and managers of companies promoting productive investment, provided they are assigned to eligible projects and with contracts for the granting of tax benefits entered into under the Investment Tax Code, approved by Decree-Law n. 162/2014, of October 31. |
| Information service activities | Linguists |
| Data processing activities, domiciliation of information and related activities and web pages | Journalists |
| News agency activities | Authors |
| Other information service activities | Hotel Directors |
| Scientific R&D activities | Specialists in the fields of physics, mathematics, engineering and other related fields |
| Research in physics and natural sciences | Restaurant Directors |
| Research in biotechnology | Commerce related Directors |
| Designers | Other Services Directors |
| Company Directors (non-shareholders) | Skilled market-oriented forestry, fishing and hunting workers |
| Investors and company directors as defined in Decree-Law n. 249/2009 of September 23. | N/A |

== Replacement by IFICI ==
The NHR regime was closed to new applicants from 1 January 2024 and replaced by the Tax Incentive for Scientific Research and Innovation (Incentivo Fiscal à Investigação Científica e Inovação, IFICI), often referred to as "NHR 2.0". The new regime is set out in Article 58-A of the Tax Benefits Statute and regulated by Ordinance (Portaria) no. 352/2024/1, of 23 December.

Under IFICI, employment and self-employment income from qualifying activities is taxed at a flat rate of 20% for ten consecutive years, and most foreign-source income is exempt from Portuguese personal income tax. Unlike the NHR regime, foreign pensions are not covered. Applicants must not have been tax resident in Portugal in the previous five years, and former NHR beneficiaries are excluded.

== Requirements ==
Under the Investment Tax Code rules, the regime is available to anyone who fulfilling the following conditions:

- Be deemed resident on Portuguese territory for tax purposes, according to any of the following criteria in the year to be taxed as a non-habitual resident:
  - Living more than 183, consecutive or not, days in Portugal in any period of 12 months starting or ending in the relevant year;
  - When living in Portugal for an inferior period, having, in any day of the 12 months threshold, a house in such conditions that allow to presume the intention to hold and occupy it as his habitual place of residence;
  - Is a crew member of a ship or aircraft on December 31, provided he is in the service of entities with residence, headquarters or effective direction in Portugal;
  - Performs abroad functions or commissions of a public nature, at the service of the Portuguese State.
- To have not been deemed resident on Portuguese territory during the five years prior to the year pretended to be taxed as a non-regular resident.

Upon application, the Portuguese Tax and Customs Authority might request proof of tax residency abroad, such as tax residency certificates, tax returns and tax settlement notices.

== Statistics ==
Among the 27.367 beneficiaries, according to 2019 numbers, just over two thousand (8%) develop professions with high-added value, while the remaining were expat pensioners. The most common nationalities among pensioners were French, Italian, and Swedish.

== What are the limitations of the NHR status? ==
The NHR status, while offering significant tax benefits, does have its limitations, such as:

- Exclusion of many occupations from the regime
- Can only apply to the individual
- It’s non-extendable past the 10-year period
