= 1986 enlargement of the European Communities =

Accession of Portugal and Spain to the European Community

EC members in 1986 New EC members admitted in 1986

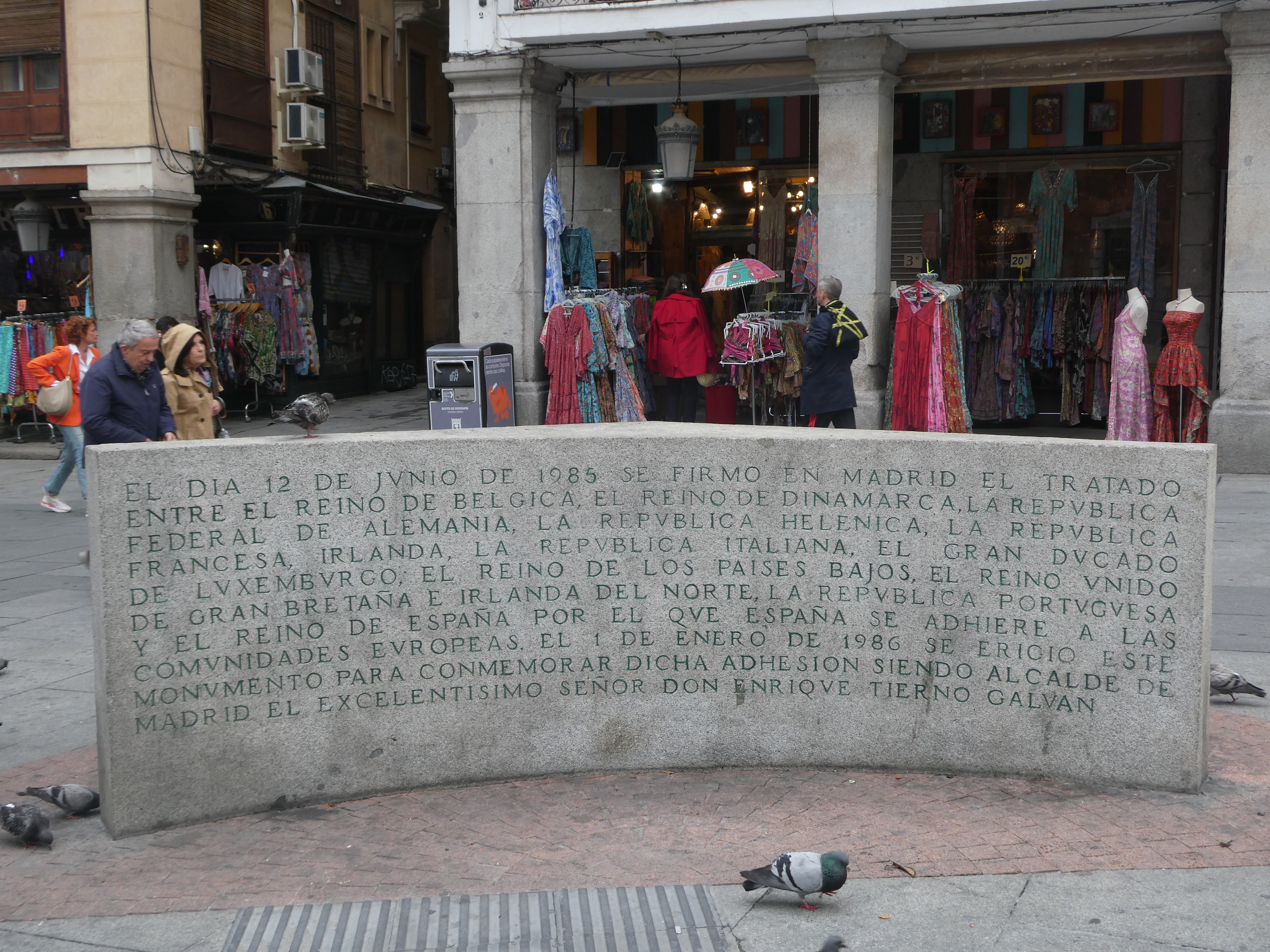
Monument in Madrid marking Spain's accession to the EC

Spain and Portugal acceded to the European Community, now the European Union, in 1986. This was the third enlargement of the Communities, following on from the 1973 and 1981 enlargements. Their accessions are considered to be a part of the broader Mediterranean enlargement of the European Union.

Spain and Portugal did not have a Referendum related to European Union accession.

Both countries had been under dictatorships until just over a decade prior to the accession, with Spain under the military dictatorship of Francisco Franco, and Portugal under the corporatist dictatorship of the Estado Novo. This had meant that, whilst both countries had previously had relationships with the Communities in some form or another, they were ineligible to become members. The mid-1970s brought the death of Franco in Spain, and the Carnation Revolution in Portugal, which rapidly pushed both countries towards democracy. Membership talks began with both countries a few years later.

Spain and Portugal acceded to the Communities on 1 January 1986. The accession took place without any official ceremony other than the raising of the Spanish and Portuguese flags in Brussels, after a period of more than six years of negotiations between the Communities and the two countries. The accession talks were particularly prolonged by concerns over the Spanish fishing fleet, which was larger than the entire Community fleet put together, as well as severe governmental turbulence in Portugal, where several governments collapsed and one prime minister died in an aeroplane crash during the negotiations.

Some scholars at the time predicted that increased competition from Europe would lead to economic problems for Spain and Portugal; however, in the years since, both countries' economies have benefited overall from the accession. The enlargement is also credited by some with helping to stabilise the fledgling democracies of both countries, as well as speeding up the decolonisation of the Portuguese Empire; whilst there is broadly consensus that membership played some role in these processes, there remains debate as to whether membership was the deciding factor in these changes, or whether it merely contributed.

== History ==
=== Spain ===
==== Relations under Franco ====
Spain first applied for association with the European Economic Community (EEC), the general economic arm of the three European Communities, on 10 February 1962. The country was ineligible for full membership as a direct consequence of its dictatorship; whilst there was no specific provision in the treaty establishing the EEC requiring that Member States be democracies, the European Parliament made clear just months after the application that an undemocratic Spain would never have any relationship negotiated "closer than a commercial treaty", with further European integration in mind.

The Committee of Ministers of the Council of Europe passed a resolution by 70 votes to 31 in its 14th ordinary session in May 1962 calling for members of the EEC to "examine the possibility of some form of economic agreement between Spain and the Community, bearing in mind the constitutional changes that will be necessary before any form of political association can be contemplated". However, the application caused some controversy; a number of members of the European Parliament questioned whether the application was acceptable, given Spain's dictatorship.

With the question of association still unresolved by 1964, the head of the Spanish mission to the EEC sent another letter on 14 February renewing the request for association status. Talks were subsequently scheduled to begin in the autumn of that year. Eventually, in 1967, the Council of the EEC approved a mandate for the commission to negotiate with Spain, and a trade agreement was signed in June 1970. However, this was a trade preference agreement, as opposed to an association agreement; this meant only reciprocity in trade concessions, as opposed to the economic development assistance and the possibility of eventual full membership that was granted through association status to, for instance, Greece and Turkey. Discussions remained in the 1970s about what the future relationship between the EEC and Spain might look like, after the formation of an EEC–Spain joint committee.

==== The Spanish transition and applying for Community membership ====
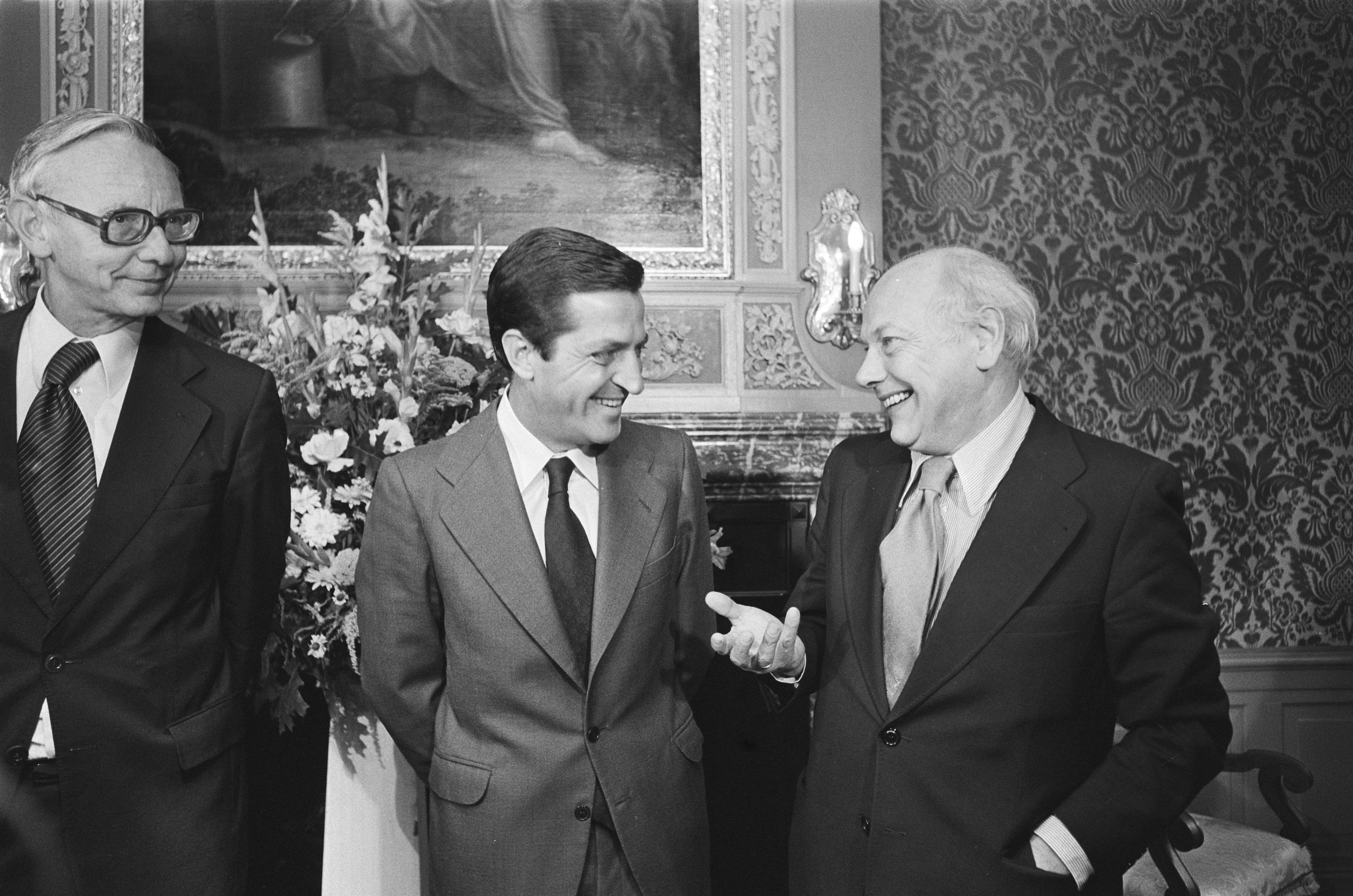
Oreja and Suárez with Joop den Uyl, the Prime Minister of the Netherlands, in August 1977, following Spain's application

Following the death of Spanish dictator Francisco Franco, who had ruled over the country for 36 years, and the beginnings of the Spanish transition to democracy, rumours had been circulating for some time in 1977 about the possibility of a Spanish request for membership of the EEC. On 26 July, the new democratic government of Spain led by Adolfo Suárez wrote three letters to the President of the Council of Ministers of the European Communities, Henri Simonet, each requesting the admission of Spain to each different European Community. These letters were hand-delivered by the Foreign Minister of Spain, Marcelino Oreja, to the President of the European Commission, Roy Jenkins, in Brussels on 28 July 1977.

At the time, significant concerns were raised with regards to whether or not Spain would be accepted into the EEC. Spanish press talked of a potential veto from France and Italy against its accession, on the basis of the potential threat it would pose to their agricultural sectors. However, more than a year after the application was made, after extensive consultation and negotiation with existing Member States, the European Commission published in November 1978 an official opinion on Spain's application for membership. The opinion recommended that membership negotiations begin, but noted that the process to becoming a member of the EEC was likely to be a slow one, citing both financial and bureaucratic barriers.

==== Membership negotiations ====
On 5 February 1979, negotiations were opened between Spain and the European Council – the committee of leaders of the Member States of the European Communities. Roy Jenkins declared during a speech at the opening of the negotiations that "Spain is a part of Europe, and Europe is incomplete without Spain".

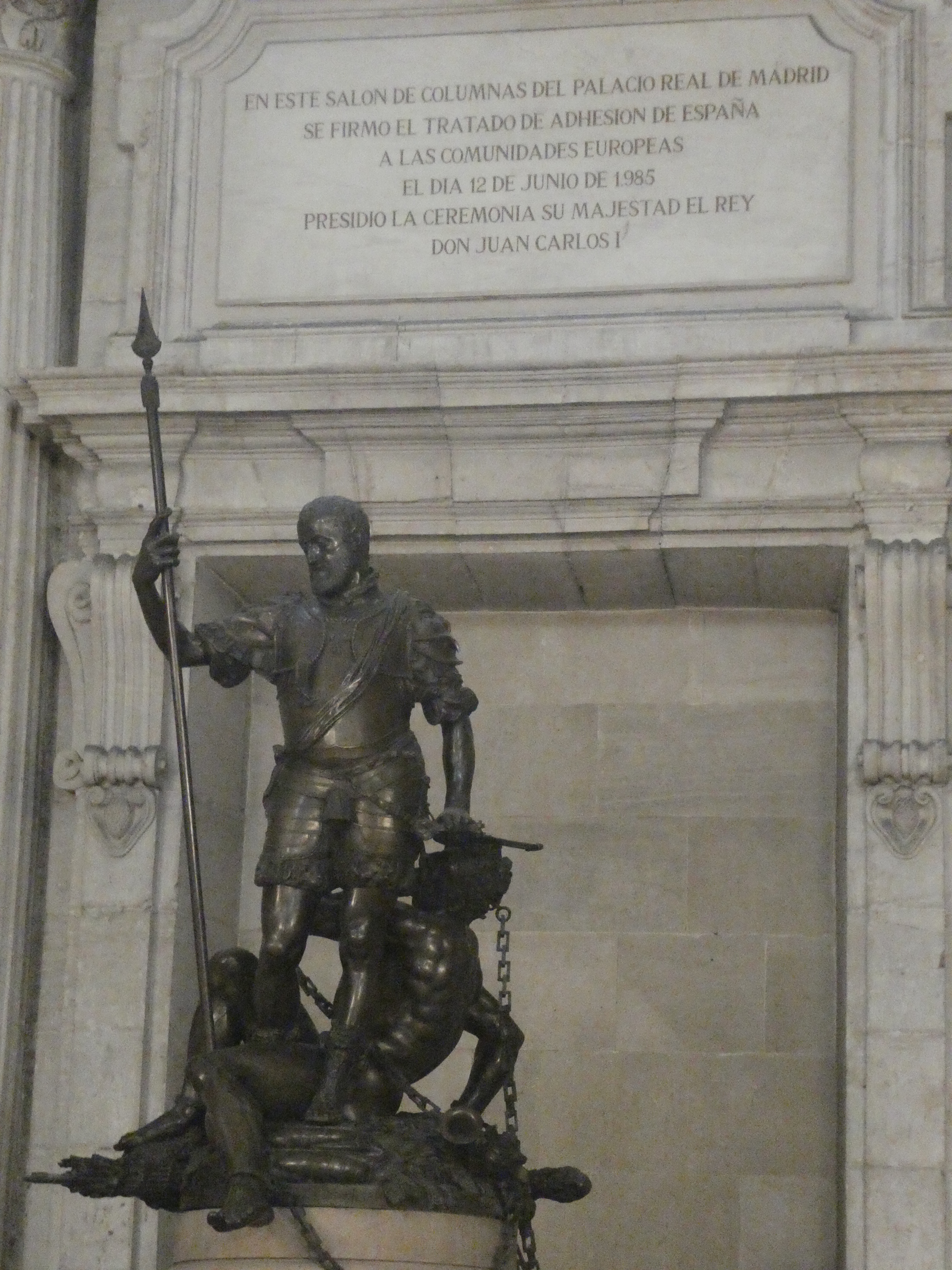
Plaque in the Royal Palace of Madrid marking the 12 June 1985 signing of the agreement that brought Spain into the EC.

An attempted coup d'état in Spain in February 1981, in which elements of the Spanish Civil Guard attempted to remove the democratically elected government from office, represented a significant point of international attention during the membership negotiations. The EEC was no exception to this, expressing its concern about the unfolding events. The attempt was unsuccessful, and following its failure, the European Council met on 23–24 March 1981. It subsequently released a statement expressing its "great satisfaction at the reaction of the King, the government, and the Spanish people, faced by recent attacks against the democratic system of their country". Felipe González, the leader of the opposition Spanish Socialist Workers' Party, went on a tour of Western Europe in March of the same year to "urge" nations to admit Spain to the EEC "as quickly as possible"; the EEC was, according to a Spanish diplomat speaking in 1982, seen as "a synonym for democracy" among the population. In spite of this, the speed of the negotiations was not significantly increased by the events.

A year later, the Spanish Socialist Workers' Party were elected into government following the 1982 Spanish general election, making González the Prime Minister. Prior to the election, Spanish negotiations with the Communities had reportedly stalled; this was not only due to the coup attempt, but also thanks to opposition from the French government over concerns related to the Common Agricultural Policy leading to greater competition from Spain. González once again put emphasis on the EEC during his election campaign, and at the same time downplayed the issue of Spanish membership of NATO, which had been a controversial issue within the debate about opening Spain up to the world for a number of years.

Concerns were also raised over the potential impact of Spain's accession in particular on the operation of the Common Fisheries Policy. The Spanish fishing fleet was larger than the entire fleet of the existing Community members put together, which had presented an issue in a similar manner during the negotiation of an interim agreement on fishing between Spain and the Community. It was evident during the Spanish negotiations for admission that Spain had become more responsive to the fishing sector, as a consequence of the high propensity of illegal fishing leading to fishermen "mobilising as a socio-occupational group". The Spanish Act of Accession eventually devoted fifty of its pages to fisheries-related matters, around 10% of the entire treaty.

Beginning to tire of the long negotiations by December 1983, the French government requested a deadline be imposed on the accession talks, proposing 30 September 1984 as the date. The French government continued applying pressure in favour of this deadline into 1984, and it was agreed to by the Member States at the March 1984 Brussels Summit of the European Council. However, the agreed deadline was not met, with questions over fishing, agriculture and steel still remaining by the end of September, and more negotiations scheduled beyond the deadline. At the end of October 1984, a commitment was made that Spain and Portugal would join the Communities on 1 January 1986, although there remained "difficulties" still in a number of areas of the negotiations. This commitment was confirmed by a vote at the European Council summit on 3 December 1984, so long as "final negotiations [were] successful".

=== Portugal ===
==== Relations under the Estado Novo ====
In July 1959, just over a year after the EEC was established, the government of Portugal began the process of establishing a diplomatic mission to it, and to Euratom the same month. However, Portugal considered its "multi-continental structure" (in reference to its many overseas colonies) to be incompatible with EEC membership; even had it wished to join, its contemporary dictatorship would have made an accession difficult to impossible.

In spite of these factors, Portugal was a founding member of the European Free Trade Association (EFTA), which was initially aimed to compete with the EEC as a European common economic zone. EFTA, constituting something closer to a pure free trade zone than the EEC, was a more palatable prospect at the time for Portugal than taking on the full rules and regulations of the EEC. At the time of the organisation's foundation in 1960, Portugal was still under the Estado Novo corporatist dictatorship, led by António de Oliveira Salazar; a year later, the government of Portugal published a report decrying the decision taken by members of the Organisation for European Economic Cooperation to establish the EEC "without consulting their partners in the Organisation", and saying that "The Portuguese Government is once again convinced that the spirit of understanding and solidarity that underpinned the establishment and operation of the European Free Trade Association will prevail".

A Portuguese government report completed at the start of 1962 acknowledged that seeking entry as a member of the EEC would have been unlikely to end in success, and suggested that an application for associate status might have been a better option. A few months later, in April 1962, the Portuguese Ambassador to Brussels was instructed to open negotiations with the EEC to move towards this goal, in spite of potential hostilities due to "disapproval of the basic principles" of contemporary Portuguese government policy. However, the Portuguese government did not clarify what type of negotiations were being asked for, or what the future relationship they envisaged looked like. There was also significant international opposition to any meaningful agreement being made with Portugal, as a consequence of the country's authoritarian regime, with the General Secretary of the International Confederation of Free Trade Unions intervening in June saying "We remain convinced that the Members of the Council of Ministers will not permit countries subjected to a regime like the Portuguese government of today to enter a community whose primary reason to exist is to strengthen the free world". The 1962 negotiations were later postponed indefinitely.

Portugal once again looked to open negotiations with the EEC in 1969. These negotiations were more fruitful, and eventually culminated in a trade agreement between the EEC and Portugal, albeit one that came at the same time as the EEC were negotiating free trade agreements with all Member States of EFTA.

Diplomatic efforts towards Portuguese membership of the EEC were restarted in the early 1970s, still during the time of the Estado Novo dictatorship, but with Marcelo Caetano having assumed the office of prime minister after Salazar's death. Exploratory talks began in confidence on 7 January 1971, with Caetano's attitude to Portuguese-EEC relations being described as "pragmatic", seeing that Europe would continue to be incredibly important for the country as their main trading partner.

On 19 December 1972, the EEC and the Portuguese government concluded an agreement significantly reducing tariffs on imports in trade between the two. This was the last move towards Europe on the part of Portugal before the fall of the Estado Novo regime.

==== EC loans and application under democracy ====
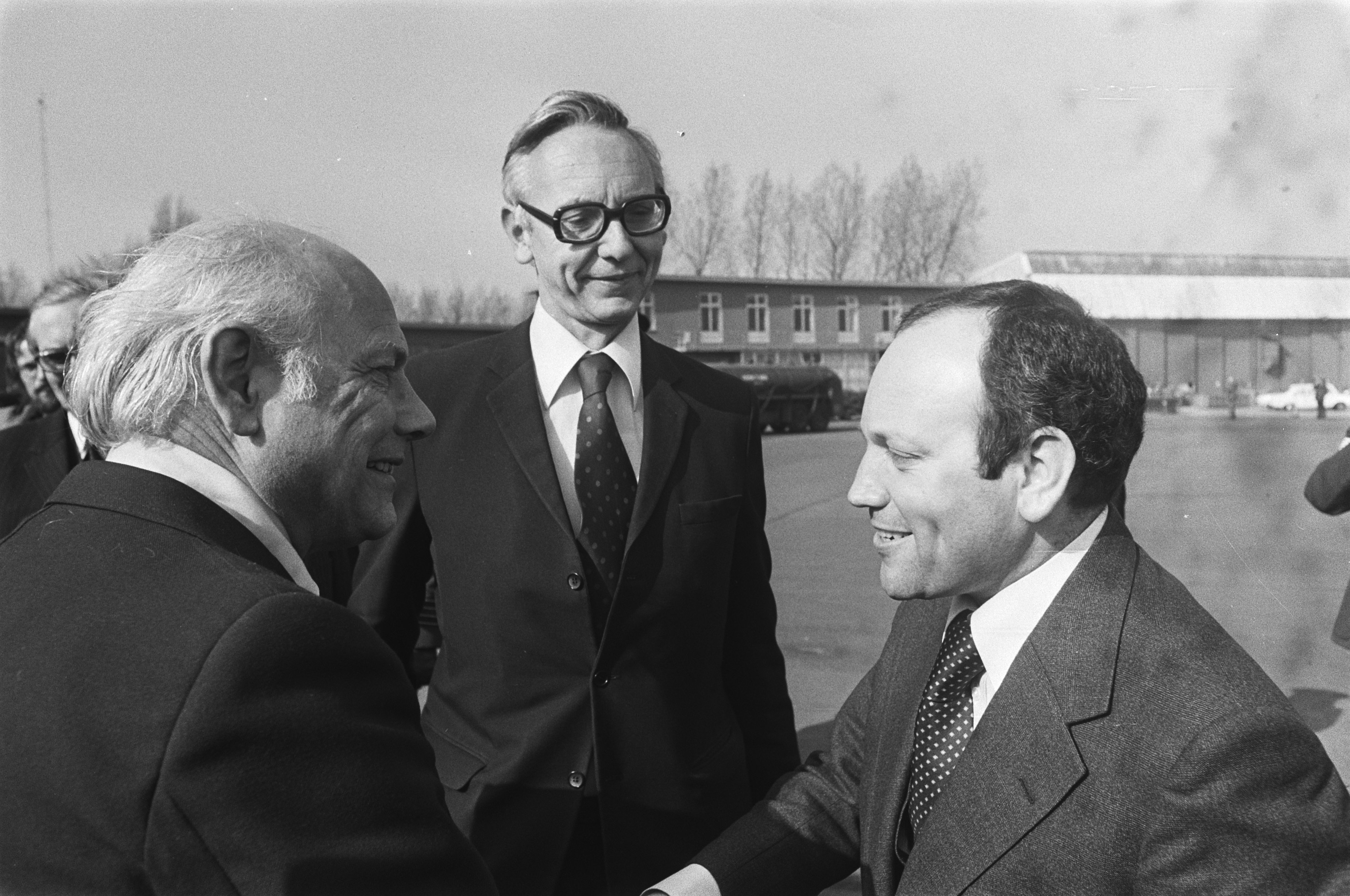
José Manuel de Medeiros Ferreira (right) in the Netherlands on 9 March 1977, just weeks before the Portuguese application

Following the Carnation Revolution of 1974 and the first democratic elections in 1975, the new Portuguese government started to take greater steps towards European integration. Over the course of the early 1970s, the European Investment Bank loaned millions of units of account – a pre-Euro European system of monetary exchange without preference to a single currency – to Portugal, with the objective of "giving its fullest support to Portugal's efforts to strengthen democracy and promote social and economic progress". In June 1976, the exchange rate for units of account to US dollars meant the amount loaned at the time, UA 70 million, was worth $79.1 million, equivalent to $348,000,000 in 2025.

The first democratically elected government of Portugal spoke of its programme as one that "intends that Portugal be present in the common effort of democratic European countries in the political, economic, social and cultural transformation of the old continent". These efforts bore their first fruits in September 1976, with the entrance of Portugal into the Council of Europe.

In 1977, just before Portugal made its formal application to join the Communities, Mário Soares, the prime minister of Portugal, and his foreign minister both went on a tour of European capitals, attempting to gather preliminary support for his country's accession. Shortly afterwards, on 28 March, Portugal made their formal application to join the European Communities, with a series of three letters written by Soares to David Owen, the President of the council. The Portuguese government at the time claimed that the application was not "the decision of a government" but rather "the decision of a people".

Just over a year after the application was made, on 19 May 1978, the Commission issued a positive opinion on the Portuguese application for membership, following which membership negotiations were opened. Although the opinion recommended that the Portuguese application be considered, it also highlighted significant dangers inherent to a Portuguese accession in the country's state at the time, noting that "profound social and economic reforms" would be required before admission could be successful.

==== Governmental turbulence ====
In the immediate months following the opening of negotiations, there was some concern expressed over the level of support within the Portuguese populace for membership of the Communities, with the French newspaper Le Monde reporting that half of the population of Lisbon were unaware of what the Common Market was, rising to 72% in Porto. Furthermore, at the end of 1979, after the government collapsed several times, Parliament was dissolved and fresh elections were called, leading to the election of a new prime minister, Francisco de Sá Carneiro. However, after having been in office for only a year, Carneiro died in the 1980 Camarate air crash. He was replaced as prime minister by Francisco Pinto Balsemão, whose government highlighted in their program concerns over "negative economic and social consequences" resulting from Community regulations that "suppose a different stage of structural evolution" in a Member State. During Balsemão's government, a new Transitional Protocol was agreed between the EEC and Portugal, adjusting some of the tariffs applicable to trade between the two, with "a view to the accession of the Portuguese Republic to the Communities".

In 1983, amid a storm of resignations, Balsemão's government too collapsed, and the 1983 Portuguese legislative election was called. The elections led to the return of the Socialist Party, and consequently the return of Mário Soares as prime minister. However, with insufficient support in the Portuguese Assembly, Soares was forced to form a coalition with Carneiro's party, the Social Democratic Party. The new coalition's program stated that "accession to the EEC in good time and under the right conditions [...] is the top priority of Portuguese economic and foreign policy".

==== Internal political reactions ====
After 23 meetings of negotiations between ministers in Portugal and the Communities, on 24 October 1984, a joint statement was signed in Dublin between Soares, Garret FitzGerald, the president of the European Council, and Lorenzo Natali, the Vice-President of the commission, "reaffirming the objective" of Portugal joining the Community on 1 January 1986. In debates in the Portuguese Assembly, the Socialist Party, the Social Democratic Party and the Independent Social Democratic Association all expressed their agreement with the accession arrangements.

The planned entrance was not entirely without opposition; some members of the Portuguese Democratic Movement, which had been an important force in Portuguese politics at the time, claimed the accession was a "myth" that "served as an alibi" for the Portuguese government to "avoid being confronted with the disastrous economic and social consequences of its policy", whilst the Portuguese Communist Party (PCP) member Carlos Carvalhas claimed the EEC were "ready to sacrifice [...] the interests of other countries". The Communist-led union Intersindical stood with the PCP, who still exist today, in opposing EEC membership, on the grounds of what they considered to be loss of economic control that it would cause. However, the Communist Party was the only Portuguese political party at the time consistently opposed to EEC membership, and they began to receive fewer and fewer votes starting in the mid-1980s, around the time of accession.

== International reaction ==
=== United Kingdom and Gibraltar ===
The status of the British Overseas Territory of Gibraltar was a significant sticking point in the negotiations for Spain's accession. The Spanish Socialist Workers' Party were elected into government in 1982 on a manifesto including both EEC membership and a return of the territory to Spain. Following the election, the Spanish government re-opened the border with Gibraltar to pedestrians on "humanitarian" grounds, which laid the foundation for further negotiations with the United Kingdom, although no other types of traffic were permitted through. These negotiations continued for some time, with one suggestion being that the territory could be turned into a NATO military base with shared sovereignty as a consequence. The negotiations surrounding the status of Gibraltar were described at the time by Fernando Morán, the Spanish foreign minister, as "the most decisive and delicate moment" of Spain's accession negotiations.

The government of the United Kingdom at the time declared themselves publicly to be in favour of Portugal and Spain joining the Communities, with the Minister of State for the Foreign and Commonwealth Office saying that the country had been a "staunch supporter of the accession". However, Margaret Thatcher, the British prime minister, stated in 1983 that Spain could not accede to the Communities "until the restrictions on the border between Spain and Gibraltar are lifted"; Lord Trefgarne, an undersecretary of state at the time, even went so far as to say that the restrictions were "incompatible with the obligations" of Spain as a member of the EEC. Thatcher's government's insistence on a complete re-opening of the border prior to EEC entry "angered" the Spanish government of the time; however, they also said that they would be prepared to allow vehicular and other crossings, rather than just those on foot. After even further protracted negotiations, the border was fully reopened on 5 February 1985.

=== Greek veto ===
From 1982 onwards, Greece had been trying to secure approval by the European Council for the Integrated Mediterranean Programmes (IMPs), a series of financial aid measures for disadvantaged regions of the Communities. Having had little success, and with the idea still under "consideration" by the Council several years later, Greece threatened to veto the accessions of Spain and Portugal. The veto was based on Greece's claims that its economy would not be able to cope with more economically weak Member States joining, without receiving agricultural subsidies for its poorest regions that had not yet been approved.

In late 1984, Andreas Papandreou, the prime minister of Greece, formally confirmed that the only blocker for Greek approval of the accessions was the availability of financial subsidy through the IMPs. This drew criticism from other Member States, who argued that Greek financial demands to the Communities should not affect the accession of new members, and led to doubts from Gaston Thorn, the President of the commission, that completing the agreements would be possible for an accession date of 1 January 1986.

Negotiations continued on into 1985, and on 29 May, the Italian Minister for Foreign Affairs Giulio Andreotti, in conjunction with Spain's Fernando Morán and the Portuguese Finance Minister Ernâni Lopes, announced that an agreement had been reached. Some parts of the IMPs would be implemented, thereby increasing EEC funding to Greece; consequentially, Greece dropped its reservations, and Portugal and Spain would enter the "Europe of Twelve" on 1 January 1986. In total, Greece received US$2,000,000,000 in additional aid as a consequence of the negotiations, equivalent to $6.0×10^{9} in 2025.

== Impact ==
Data in the table is as of 1986, unless otherwise stated.
Member countries	Capital	Population	Area (km^{2})	Population per km^{2}	GDP (billion US$)	GDP per capita (US$)	Languages (Note: Includes only national languages; several Member States have various co-official languages, including Spain)
Portugal	Lisbon	10,030,621	92,389	108.57	38.746	3,863	Portuguese
Spain	Madrid	38,531,195	504,782	76.33	251.321	6,523	Spanish
Accession countries		48,561,816	597,171	81.32	290.067	5,973.15	2
Existing members		273,271,000 (Note: Calculated by summing the 1986 mid-year estimates for the existing members of the Communities as of 1986 from the UN report)	1,664,740	164.15	2,187 (Note: World Bank data is insufficient for this purpose, as it appears to make no distinction between West Germany and East Germany in its historical data. The data here is an approximate estimate based on the latest available GNP data presented in the CIA World Factbook 1986 edition.)	8,003.04	7
EU12 after accessions		321,832,816	2,261,911	142.28	2,477.067	7,696.75	9

=== Democratic transition ===
Membership of the Communities is widely seen as having assisted the transitions to democracy of Spain and Portugal; however, there is some debate as to what extent Community membership is responsible for this. The prerequisite that a state should be a democracy before joining the Communities has been described as a motivating factor for democratisation, and such a requirement has been suggested for agreements such as the North American Free Trade Agreement as a result. Eurobarometer surveys between 1985 and 1997 found a significant majority of Portuguese citizens felt that EU membership had benefited their country; this peaked at 82% of the population in 1991, before falling to a low of 67% in 1997.

=== Acquis communautaire ===
Special arrangements agreed for Spain and Portugal as new EEC members meant that, whilst in principle they were subject to the acquis communautaire of the Common Fisheries Policy, they were not fully integrated into it for many years. It has also been argued that the acquis on environmental policy "imposed significant costs" on accession countries; compliance pressure and capacity building assistance from the Communities, later the EU, has been described as "necessary but not sufficient" alone to foster successful environmental governance in the accession countries. However, other scholars have argued that the eventual benefit from the acquis has outweighed this, and pointed out that Spain has come to ardently insist on new EU members taking up the entire acquis.

=== International relations ===
Shortly after formally joining in 1986, both Spain and Portugal agreed to proposed changes to the Treaty of Rome which limited individual countries' abilities to veto proposed legislation affecting tariffs and trade, and committed to a common foreign policy for Community Member States. They also expressed themselves to be in favour of a doubling of the research budget of the EEC over a period of 5 years.

The accession of Portugal to the European Communities also had an impact on the decolonisation of Portuguese colonies in Africa and on Europe-Africa relations consequently. Whilst the acquis communautaire itself had been weak, dominated only by the European Political Cooperation, the acquis politique was very much in favour of decolonisation, a process which Portugal was pushed to adopt in order to join the Communities - although there is debate as to whether the planned accession was the primary cause.

=== Economic impact ===
The accession led to significant benefits for both in terms of economic stability and strength, and the average per-capita income of Portuguese and Spanish citizens grew significantly, reaching 74% and 83% respectively of the EU average by 2003. Structural funds offered by European Community membership were of particular importance in easing pressure on the countries' economies, especially following the Single European Act reforms that doubled the amount of structural funds available between 1988 and 1993. In Portugal, these funds were invested primarily in road infrastructure, public buildings and urban renewal, indirectly creating many new jobs in the construction industry, which led to a significant (if small in absolute terms) increase in "unskilled or low-skilled" migration to the country.

The dismantling of tariff barriers subsequent to both countries' accessions led some scholars to predict the collapse of industry in the two countries; a columnist of the Harvard International Review, Anne Robinson, predicted "both Spain's and Portugal's generally under-productive and inefficient industries will collapse, creating profitable new markets for exporters in Europe's modernised north". "Restrictive administrative practices" in Spain, however, are noted as having "penalised" products from abroad, placing a preference on locally produced ones. Concerns were also expressed over potential impacts of the Common Agricultural Policy on the Portuguese farming industry, especially with regard to pushes for afforestation and extensification - although these were additionally noted to have benefits for some industries, including in logging and paper production.

== See also ==
- 1973 enlargement of the European Communities
- 1981 enlargement of the European Communities
- 1995 enlargement of the European Union
- 2004 enlargement of the European Union
- 2007 enlargement of the European Union
- 2013 enlargement of the European Union
