= João Maurício Fernandes Salgueiro =

Portuguese economist and politician (1934–2023)

Minister of Finance
- In office 4 September 1981 – 9 June 1983
- Preceded by: João Morais Leitão
- Succeeded by: Ernâni Lopes

Personal details
- Born: 4 September 1934 Braga, Portugal
- Died: 17 February 2023 (aged 88)
- Party: PSD
- Education: Technical University of Lisbon
- Occupation: Economist

João Maurício Fernandes Salgueiro (4 September 1934 – 17 February 2023) was a Portuguese economist and politician. A member of the Social Democratic Party, he served as Minister of Finance from 1981 to 1983.

Salgueiro died on 17 February 2023, at the age of 88.
