= João de Fontes Pereira de Melo =

Portuguese politician and general

Colonial governor of Cape Verde
- In office 1839–1842
- Preceded by: Joaquim Pereira Marinho
- Succeeded by: Francisco de Paula Bastos
- In office 1847–1851
- Preceded by: José Miguel de Noronha
- Succeeded by: Fortunato José Barreiros

Martitime and Overseas Minister of Portugal
- Incumbent
- Assumed office 1849
- Preceded by: Count of Tojal
- Succeeded by: Agostinho Albano

Personal details
- Born: 25 January 1780 Elvas, Caia e São Pedro
- Died: 28 October 1856 (aged 76) Lisbon

João de Fontes Pereira de Melo (25 January 1780 – 28 October 1856) was a Portuguese politician and a general in the 19th century. He was colonial governor of Cape Verde and Minister of the Maritime and Overseas.

He served two terms as colonial governor of Cape Verde: from 1839 to 1842, and from 28 June 1848 to 23 August 1851. From 22 August to 18 December 1847, he was the Maritime and Overseas minister under the Duke of Saldanha. He succeeded João Gualberto de Oliveira (the Count of Tojal) and was succeeded by Agostinho Albano. He was the father of the Portuguese prime minister António Maria de Fontes Pereira de Melo.

== See also ==
- List of colonial governors of Cape Verde
- History of Cape Verde

Preceded by Joaquim Pereira Marinho	Colonial governor of Cape Verde; 1839-1842	Succeeded by Francisco de Paula Bastos
Preceded by José Miguel de Noronha	Colonial governor of Cape Verde; 1847-1851	Succeeded by Fortunato José Barreiros
Preceded by Count of Tojal	Maritime and Overseas Minister of Portugal; 1847	Succeeded by Agostinho Albano
