= Meroni doctrine =

In European Union (EU) law, the Meroni doctrine, which arose from cases C-9/56 and C-10/56 (Meroni v High Authority [1957/1958] ECR 133), relates to the extent to which EU institutions may delegate their tasks to regulatory agencies. The doctrine is controversial, notably because it would be anachronistic in view of the growing complexity of EU competences.

In the view of some, the Meroni doctrine no longer holds since the 2014 European Court of Justice judgement in the UK v Parliament and Council case on the Short Selling Regulation, where the Court upheld most of the provisions that were delegated to the European Securities and Markets Authority by the co-legislators.
