= Fortunato José Barreiros =

Portuguese colonial administrator and military architect

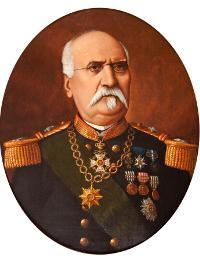

Colonial governor of Cape Verde
- In office 23 August 1851 – 3 December 1854
- Preceded by: João de Fontes Pereira de Melo
- Succeeded by: António Maria Barreiros Arrobas

Personal details
- Born: 26 March 1797 Elvas
- Died: 16 August 1885 (aged 88) Lisbon

Fortunato José Barreiros (26 March 1797 – 16 August 1885) was a Portuguese colonial administrator and a military architect.

== Biography ==
Barreiros was born in Elvas in southern Portugal.

=== Military career ===
Fortunato Barreiros started his career at age 9 on 25 April 1805 at the 3rd Artillery Regiment. On 23 January 1821, he was promoted captain of the General Staff of the Army. In 1824, he took part in the April Revolt, he had been arrested at Castelo de S. Jorge. In 1876, he took over as commander of the Military School and in the following year, he became President of the Commission on reform of the same school.

He finished his career on his post as General of the Division in 1870.

Throughout his life as a soldier, Fortunato Barreiros received different titles and medals including Knight of the Tower and Sword (1833), Knight of Aviz (1834), Commander of Aviz (1847), Commander of Leopold I of Belgium (1956), a medal of D. Pedro and D. Maria number 5 and the Grand Cross of the Military Order of S. Bento de Aviz in 1869.

=== Civil and political career ===
He was governor general of the Province of Cape Verde between 23 August 1851 and 3 December 1854. He succeeded João de Fontes Pereira de Melo and was succeeded by António Maria Barreiros Arrobas. He was taught at the Royal Military Academy and the Royal Fortification, Artillery and Designing Academy, he was member of the commission of revisions at the Escola Politécnica (Polytechnic School). In 1838, he effectively elected to the class of Exact Sciences at the Royal Academy of Sciences in 1849 and 1851, he was later elected President of the General Assembly.

In 1868, he was nominated by the consultive commission of the Minister of War.

== Works ==
- Considerações sobre a defesa do porto de Lisboa (Consideration on the Defense of the Port of Lisbon)
- Nota acerca do emprego dos odres nas pontes militares
- Memória descritiva da praça de Elvas e seus fortes adjacentes (Descriptive Memoir of Elvas Beach and its Nearby Forts)
- Nacionalidade Portuguesa (Portuguese Nationality)
- Milícia Romana (Roman Army)
- Ensaio sobre os princípios gerais de estratégia e de grande táctica, (1837)
- Princípios gerais de castrametação, aplicados ao acampamento das tropas portuguesas, (1838)
- Memória sobre os pesos e medidas em Portugal, Espanha, Inglaterra e França (Memoir on Weights and Measures in Portugal, Spain, England and France)
- Instrução teórico-prática de artilharia (Practical Theory Instruction on Artillery)
- Compêndio de Artilharia (Memoir on the Main)
- Memória sobre os principais melhoramentos que têm recebido a espingarda de infantaria desde 1815

== See also ==
- List of colonial governors of Cape Verde
- History of Cape Verde

== Notes ==
Preceded by João de Fontes Pereira de Melo	Colonial governor of Cape Verde; 1851-1854	Succeeded by António Maria Barreiros Arrobas
