= António Maria Barreiros Arrobas =

Portuguese colonial administrator

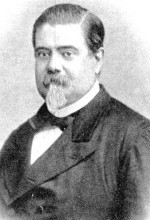
- Arrobas in 1874

Colonial governor of Cape Verde
- In office 3 Dec 1854 – 28 Mar 1858
- Preceded by: Fortunato José Barreiros
- Succeeded by: Sebastião Lopes de Calheiros e Meneses

Personal details
- Born: 18 July 1824 Lisbon
- Died: 20 May 1888 (aged 63) Lisbon

António Maria Barreiros Arrobas ComA (18 July 1824 – 20 May 1888) was a Portuguese colonial administrator.

== Biography ==
Barreiros Arrobas was born in the Portuguese capital of Lisbon, to Joaquim Paulo Xavier de Mira de Magalhães Corvo Carneiro Arrobas and Dona Maria José Barreiros, he was baptized in the parish (now neighborhood) of São Sebastião da Pedreira. Barreiros Arrobas married Cecília Amélia Nunes Cardoso on 21 August 1858 (some sources stated in 1859), she was the daughter of Isidoro Nunes Cardoso and Sofia Maria.

=== Military career ===
He volunteered on 2 May 1840 with the Second Cavalry Regiment and passed the ensign of the Grenadiers of Mary II on 16 February 1844. In 1846, came the orders of tenant of the Count of Bonfim, Commander of the Division. He became tenant on 26 June 1848, captain on 29 April 1851, major on 11 April 1854. and later he was colonel for some time.

=== Governor-General of Cape Verde ===
From 3 December 1854 to 28 Mar 1858, he was the governor general of the Colonial Province of Cape Verde. He succeeded Colonel Fortunato José Barreiros, and was succeeded by Sebastião Lopes de Calheiros e Meneses. He aimed to develop the Cape Verdean capital of Praia, notably by moving the Escola Principal from the island of Brava to Praia.

=== Civil career ===
Barreiros Arrobas returned to Lisbon and functioned the direction in banks and companies. He was member of the General Council of Alfândegas and much later president of the general board of the district of Lisbon, where he was knighted in the Military Order of Aviz for his work. During the start of the civil war, the time when the government of Cabral and the Duke of Saldanha in the battle in Torres Vedras which made a large valor.

=== In politics ===
He started receiving for normalizing the political instability in Portugal, he was a candidate for deputy for the 80th circle in the elections of 18 September 1870 where he raced against Agarão Mascarenhas and Dr. Jacinto Nunes, a Renewal Party candidate. He had won with the support of the rich in the 740th circle with 1,775 votes over 908 of the opponent. In 1871, the Deputy Chamber was dissolved, he later received 2,202 votes.

In that time, he took various actions in 1875 and presented to the deputy council for representing in the city council. In 1878, he made for the new circle in Setúbal, in opposition, he got 2,093 votes with the support of Dr. Rodrigues Manitto. He was elected for Setúbal on 4 August 1870 as attorney general for the district board. Later, he became member of the Renewal Party. He remained as councillor, a peer and deputy of the courts in different legislations, he was once civil governor of the District of Lisbon.

The councillor's verified the results in Mesas de Santa Maria, S. Julião, Azeitão and Palmela. In Alcácer do Sal, it won 352 votes over 645 by the Progressist, António de Camps Valdez. The results from S. Sebastião e Anunciada were not indicated, parishes that one of them did not vote, but were the most populous, (4,830 and 5,085 inhabitants respectively)

When the Regenerator Party came to power in 1881, the Setubalean Progressist Dr. =Aníbal Álvares da Silva Júnior was out from the chamber of the municipal administrator of Cascais, in fact considered like revenge to Councillor Arrobas "for having been warred during the last elections by Dr. Aníbal, when he was mayor of Setúbal, and that opposition candidate".

=== Later life ===
He retired from politics. He died in Lisbon in his house on 5 Rua de Tesouro Velho (then as Thezouro Velho).

== See also ==
- List of colonial governors of Cape Verde
- History of Cape Verde

== Notes ==
Preceded by Fortunato José Barreiros	Colonial governor of Cape Verde; 1854-1858	Succeeded by Sebastião Lopes de Calheiros e Meneses
