= Francisco de Paula Bastos, 1st Viscount of Bastos =

Portuguese noble and military and political figure

Francisco de Paula Bastos
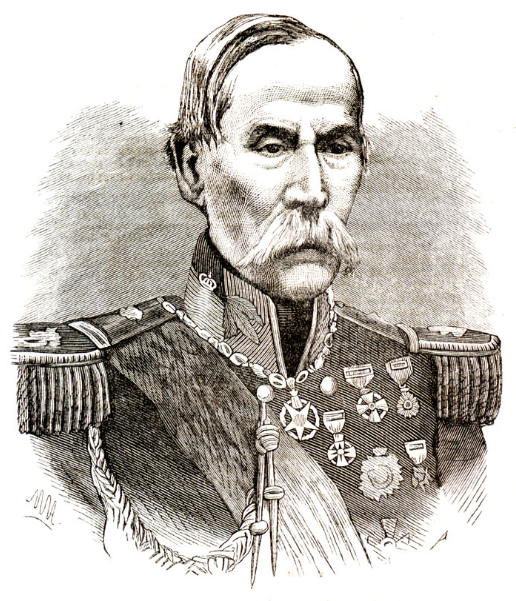
- Francisco de Paula Bastos, Viscount of Bastos

Colonial governor of Cape Verde
- In office 1836–1837
- Preceded by: João de Fontes Pereira de Melo
- Succeeded by: José Miguel de Noronha

Personal details
- Born: 11 June 1793 Portuguese Empire
- Died: 2 September 1881 (aged 88) Angra do Heroísmo, Velas, Azores Islands, Portugal

Francisco de Paula Bastos, 1st Viscount of Bastos (11 June 1793 – 2 September 1881) was a Portuguese noble, military and political figure.

== Biography ==
Bastos was born to Pedro Joaquim de Bastos, Fidalgo Cavaleiro da Casa Real (a Portuguese knighthood and title of nobility received on 30 April 1794), and his wife, Ludovina Gertrudes de São José e Melo.

He fought in the Peninsular War, where he was decorated for bravery and was injured at the Battle of Nivelle.

He emigrated to Plymouth through Galicia and later moved to Terceira Island in the Azores, where he arrived on 7 March 1828.

He again saw action during the Liberal Wars, under the command of Count of Vila Flor, joining the liberal army against the forces of Miguel I on 11 August 1829. He was again decorated with medals for his bravery during the struggle.

He was the 76th colonial governor of Cape Verde between 1842 and 1845. He received a title by King Louis I of Portugal under a decree of May 18, 1863 and was made Visconde (Viscount) de Bastos. He was one of the figures who fought for the protection of Portugal's Liberal constitution against absolutism.

He died in Angra do Heroísmo in Terceira Island on 2 September 1881, which was then the main city of the Azores.

== See also ==
- List of colonial governors of Cape Verde

== Notes ==
Preceded by João de Fontes Pereira de Melo	Colonial Governor of Cape Verde; 1836-37	Succeeded by José Miguel de Noronha
