= Januário Correia de Almeida, Count of São Januário =

Portuguese colonial administrator, military engineer and diplomat

His Excellency The Count of São Januário
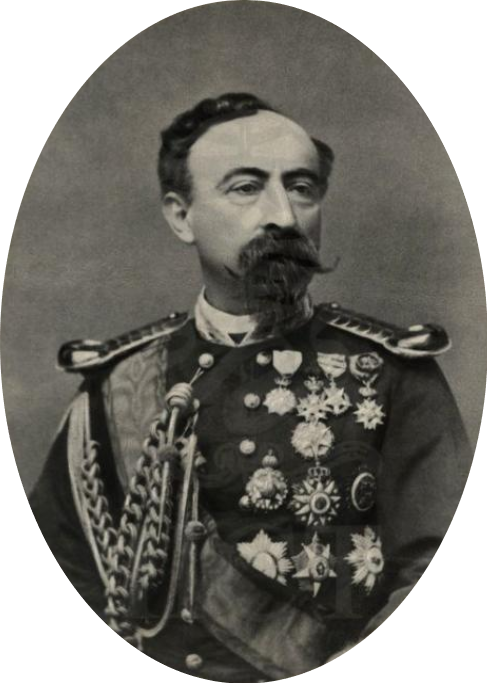
- Portrait, c. 1870

Colonial governor of Cape Verde
- In office June 1860 – 23 March 1861
- Preceded by: Sebastião Lopes de Calheiros e Meneses
- Succeeded by: Carlos Joaquim Franco

Colonial governor of Portuguese India
- In office 7 May 1870 – 12 December 1871
- Preceded by: José Ferreira Pestana
- Succeeded by: Joaquim José de Macedo e Couto

Colonial governor of Macau
- In office 23 March 1872 – 7 December 1874
- Preceded by: António Sérgio de Sousa
- Succeeded by: José Maria Lobo de Ávila

Personal details
- Born: 31 March 1829 Paço de Arcos, Oeiras, Portugal
- Died: 27 May 1901 (aged 72) Paço de Arcos, Oeiras, Portugal

Chinese name
- Traditional Chinese: 歐美德
- Simplified Chinese: 欧美德
Transcriptions
Standard Mandarin
- Hanyu Pinyin: Ōu Měidé
Yue: Cantonese
- Jyutping: au1 mei5 dak1

Januário Correia de Almeida, Count of São Januário (31 March 1829 – 27 May 1901) was a Portuguese colonial administrator, military engineer and a diplomat. He was created Baron of São Januário by King Luís I in 1866, Viscount of São Januário in 1867 and Count of São Januário in 1889. He was born in Paço de Arcos (then part of Oeiras) on 31 March 1829, a son of Januário Correia de Almeida and Bárbara Luísa dos Santos Pinto.

He studied at the faculty of mathematics of the University of Coimbra between 1849 and 1853, and after a year at the Army School, he started working as military engineer. He became director of public works in the archipelago of Cape Verde in 1854. He oversaw the construction of many public buildings and structures, including the customs house in Mindelo and the quay of the Port of Praia. In June 1860, he was appointed governor general of Cape Verde, succeeding Sebastião Lopes de Calheiros e Meneses. He was succeeded by Carlos Joaquim Franco on 23 March 1861.

He returned to Portugal and became governor of Braga District, high commissioner of Vila Real District and then governor of Porto District. On 7 May 1870, he was appointed governor general of Portuguese India, succeeding José Ferreira Pestana. He was succeeded by Joaquim José de Macedo e Couto on 12 December 1871. On 23 March 1872, he was appointed governor of Macau and Timor, succeeding António Sérgio de Sousa. He was succeeded by José Maria Lobo de Ávila in 1874, and became minister plenipotentiary to China, Japan and Siam. Besides his diplomatic work, he was an active member of the Associação dos Arqueólogos Portugueses (Association of Portuguese Archaeologists). He was one of the first European visitors of many monuments in Southeast Asia.

He returned to Lisbon in 1875 and was one of the founders of the Lisbon Geographic Society and its honorary president. In 1878 he was appointed minister plenipotentiary to the republics of South America, where he also studied the ancient cultures. From 3 June 1880 to 25 March 1881 he was Minister of Navy and the Overseas in the government of Braamcamp. He married Maria Clementina de Lancastre Vasconcelos e Sousa Leme Corte Real on 25 November 1885. They had two daughters. He died in Paço de Arcos on 27 May 1901.

== Decorations ==
He received decorations including:

- Commander of the Order of the Tower and Sword of Portugal
- Grand Cross of the Military Order of Christ of Portugal
- Grand Cross of the Order of the Immaculate Conception of Vila Viçosa of Portugal
- Grand Cross of the Military Order of São Bento de Aviz of Portugal
- Gold Medal of Good Services of Portugal
- Gold Medal of the Exemplary Behaviour of Portugal
- Grand Cross of the Order of Isabella the Catholic of Spain
- Grand Cross of Military Merit of Spain
- Grand Cross of the Order of Saints Maurice and Lazarus of Italy
- Grand Cross of the Royal Order of Cambodia
- Grand Cross of the Order of the Crown of Siam
- Grand Cross of the Order of the Rising Sun of Japan
- Grand-Official of the Legion of Honour of France
- Grand-Official of Public Instructions of France
- Grand Cross of the Order of Leopold of Belgium
- Grand Cross of the Order of the Sword of Sweden
- Dignitary of the Order of the Rose of Brazil

== See also ==
- List of colonial governors of Cape Verde
- List of governors of Portuguese India
- Governor of Macau

Preceded by Sebastião Lopes de Calheiros e Meneses	Colonial governor of Cape Verde; 1860-1861	Succeeded by Carlos Joaquim Franco
Preceded by José Ferreira Pestana	Colonial governor of Portuguese India; 1870-1871	Succeeded by Joaquim José de Macedo e Couto
Preceded by António Sérgio de Sousa	Colonial governor of Macau; 1872-1874	Succeeded by José Maria Lobo de Ávila
