= Vítor Gaspar =

Portuguese economist and former politician (born 1960)

Vítor Gaspar GCIH
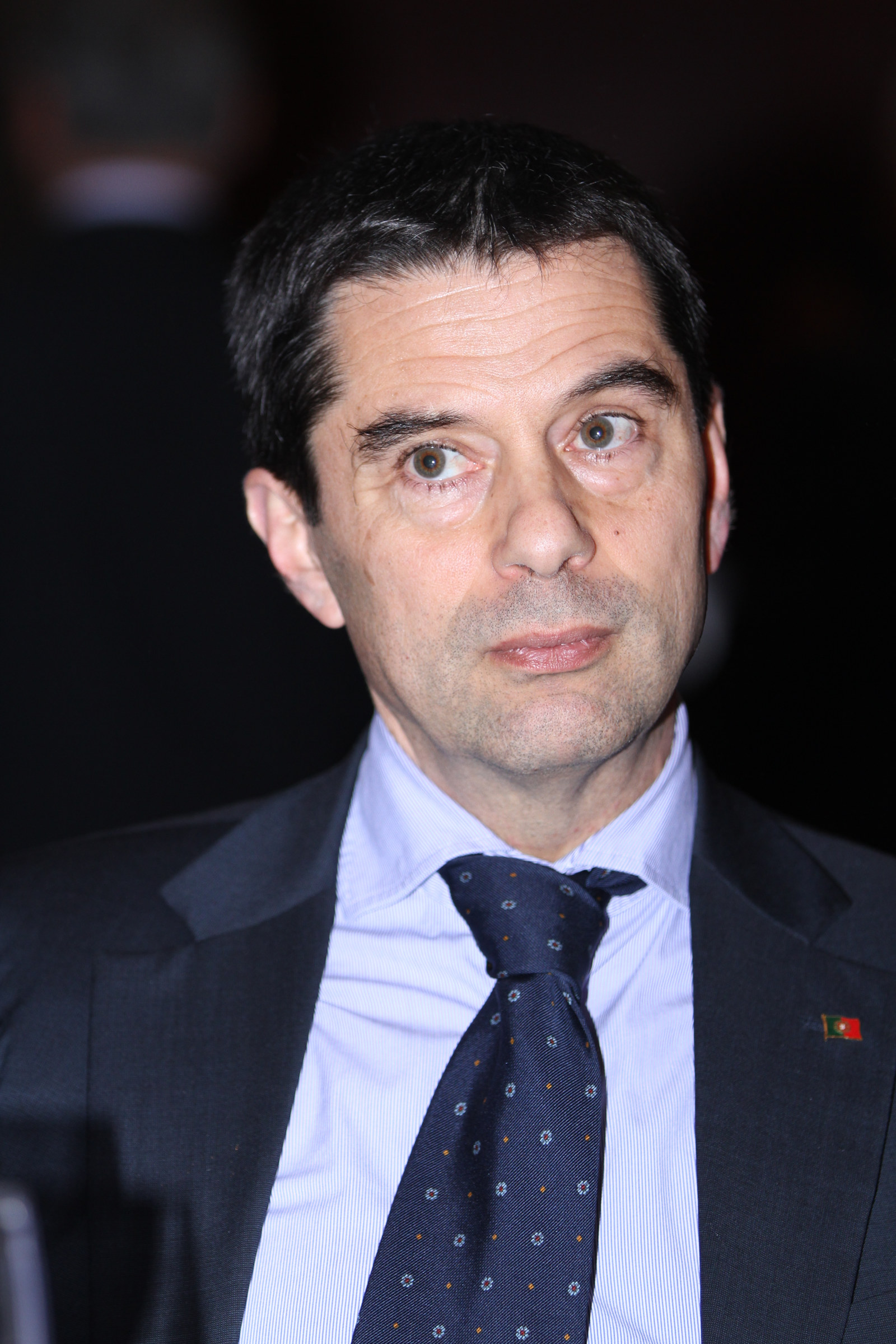
- Gaspar in 2012

Director of the Fiscal Affairs Department of the International Monetary Fund
- In office June 2014 – 27 October 2025
- Managing Director: Christine Lagarde; Kristalina Georgieva
- Preceded by: Carlo Cottarelli
- Succeeded by: Rodrigo Valdés

Minister of State and of Finance
- In office 21 June 2011 – 2 July 2013
- Prime Minister: Pedro Passos Coelho
- Preceded by: Fernando Teixeira dos Santos
- Succeeded by: Maria Luís Albuquerque

Personal details
- Born: Vítor Louçã Rabaça Gaspar; 9 November 1960 (age 65) Manteigas, Portugal
- Party: Independent
- Spouse: Sílvia Luz (m. 1985)
- Children: 3
- Relatives: Francisco Louçã (cousin)
- Education: Catholic University of Portugal; New University of Lisbon
- Profession: Economist

Vítor Louçã Rabaça Gaspar (born 9 November 1960), GCIH is a Portuguese economist and former politician, who served as Minister of Finance and Minister of State in the XIX Constitutional Government of Portugal from 21 June 2011 until his resignation on 2 July 2013.

== Education ==
Gaspar holds a degree in economics from the Universidade Católica Portuguesa (UCP) in 1982. He received a PhD in economics from the Universidade Nova de Lisboa in 1988.

== Financial career ==
Gaspar was the director-general for research at the European Central Bank for six years. Then he became an adviser to the Bank of Portugal, having been from 2007 director-general at the Bureau of European Policy Advisers (ERI) with the President of the European Commission.

== Political career ==
Without any previous political activity, he was appointed Minister of Finance in Pedro Passos Coelho's cabinet on 21 June 2011. In this capacity, Gaspar's policies included a firm intention to accomplish the European Union/IMF-led rescue plan for Portugal's sovereign debt crisis. The rescue plan consisted of widespread tax increases and reforms aimed at better efficiency and rationalized resource allocation in the public sector, in order to reduce the number of unnecessary civil servants and the public sector's chronic overcapacity.

As time went on it became increasingly clear that a series of supplementary measures would be taken during the course of the year as a means to restrain an out-of-control budget deficit. These included sharp cuts in spending on state-run healthcare, education and social security systems, along with widespread tax hikes.

On 18 October 2011 Gaspar told Portugal's main TV channel RTP1 that the wage cuts imposed on civil servants the previous week in the presentation of the State Budget for 2012 were the only way to avoid a much more painful and complex policy of mass firing of civil servants. He said that if wage cuts were not enforced, it would be necessary to sack of about 100,000 civil servants immediately (under Portuguese law, civil servants can't be sacked, so a number of special derogations would be needed to achieve this).

On 1 July 2013, he resigned and was replaced by Maria Luís Albuquerque, who had been Secretary of State of Treasury under him. Allegedly he had tried to leave office eight months earlier due to pressure of public opinion, but several newspapers reported the pivotal moment came when he was insulted and spat in a supermarket by other customers when he was shopping with his wife without personal security. He called Pedro Passos Coelho the same day, stressing he wanted to leave the government on the earliest convenience. Nevertheless, in his resignation letter, Gaspar stated that his departure was due to the growing erosion of public support for austerity measures, although these policies were largely continued by Albuquerque.

== Later career ==
Since 2014 he is the director of the Fiscal Affairs Department of the International Monetary Fund.

More recently Gaspar has come under fire as a result of a number of allegations that he prohibited studies relating to excessive rents being received from the State by EDP - Electricidade de Portugal - from being made public so as not to affect the valuation of EDP ahead of its last privatisation phase.

In a parliamentary hearing, the former Minister of Economy, Alvaro Santos Pereira, at present head of research at OECD, and the former secretary State of Economy, Henrique Gomes, confirmed that studies relating to excessive rents, charged by EDP, which for the period 2007-2020 may have amounted to €4 billion, were presented to Gaspar but he decided not to disclose this information rather than mandating the Ministry of Economy to seek compensation and financial remedies for the State.

Incidentally, the terms and conditions of the contracts signed in 2007 by the Portuguese Ministry of Economy, led by Manuel Pinho, and EDP, led by António Mexia and Manso Neto, are now being investigated for possible collusion and corruption.

The parliamentary hearing is still ongoing and it would appear that the Ministry of Finance, led by Gaspar, may have opted for a short term gain (€2.7 billion) in the last phase of privatisation, which in turn has caused significant long term pain (excessive rents €4 billion) to Portuguese tax payers, consumers and small and medium enterprises as energy costs in Portugal are amongst the highest in the EU.

== Other activities ==
- European Bank for Reconstruction and Development (EBRD), Ex-Officio Member of the Board of Governors (2011-2013)

== Recognition ==
On 12 February 2016 Gaspar was awarded the Grand Cross of the Order of Prince Henry by the then President Aníbal Cavaco Silva.

== Personal life ==
Vítor Gaspar is married with Sílvia Luz and has three daughters. He is first cousin of Francisco Louçã, former leader of Left Bloc.

In May 2013 he revealed he is a supporter of S.L. Benfica.
