= João Gualberto de Oliveira =

Portuguese politician (1788–1852)

João Gualberto de Oliveira, Count of Tojal
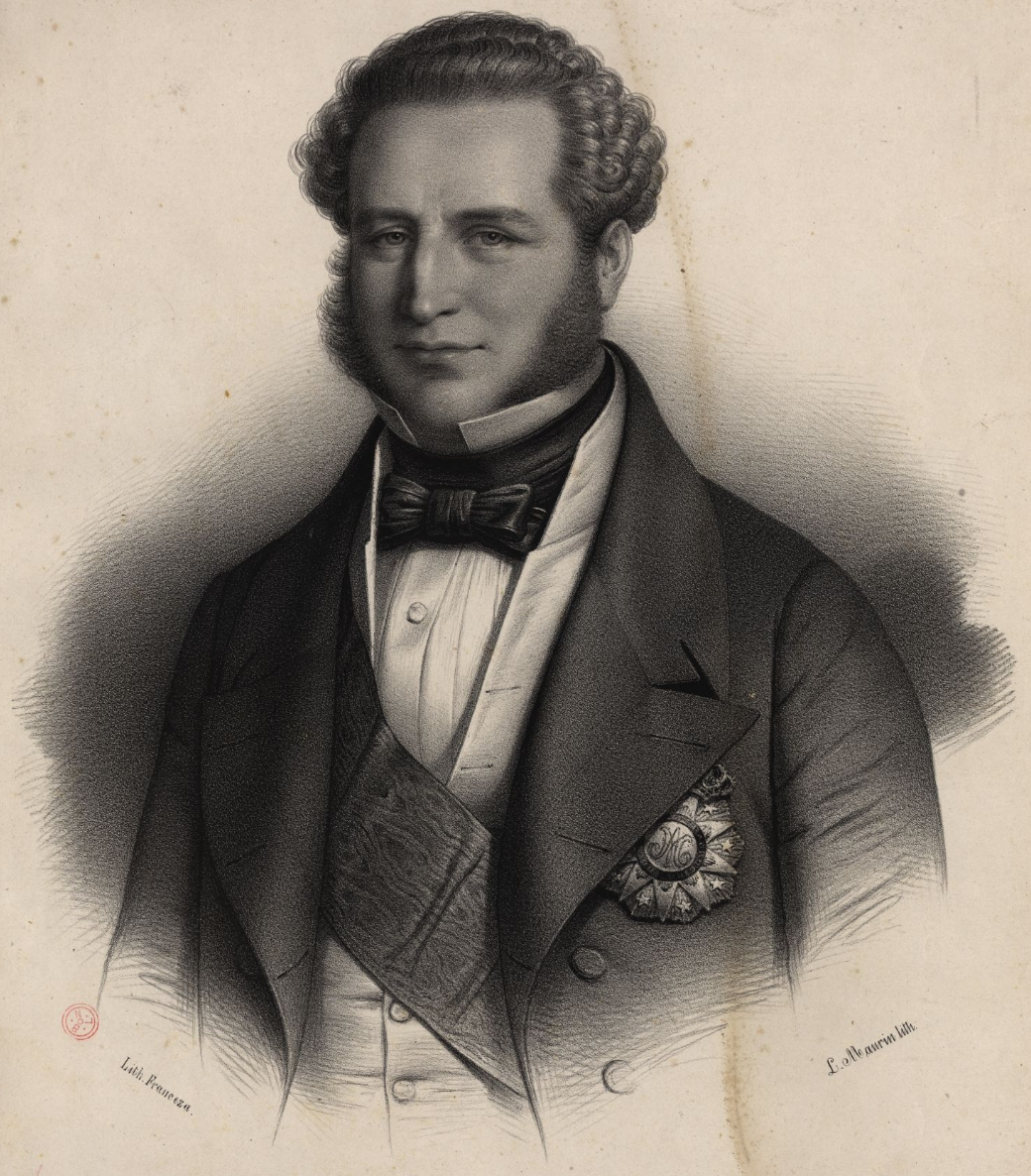
- João Gualberto de Oliveira, Count of Tojal
- Born: 12 June 1788; Funchal, Madeira, Portugal
- Died: 10 February 1862 (aged 73); Lapa, Lisbon, Portugal
- Occupation: Architect

João Gualberto de Oliveira (12 June 1788 – 10 February 1852) was a Portuguese politician. He was also the 1st Baron and later the 1st Count of Tojal.

== Biography ==
His parents were Dr. João Francisco de Oliveira, a medic from Real Câmara and Deputy of the Courts in 1822, and Maria Joaquina Farto.

He briefly visited London, he later returned to Portugal after the reestablishment of the Constitutional Regime.

He entered politics without a political militancy manifest, but as being a rich man with financial and technical knowledge. A second comment by Oliveira Martins, it was written as "um homem novo, rico, sem política, banqueiro, inglesado" ("a new man, rich, without politics, banker".

In 1837, he was Deputy of the nation's constitutional courts and later in June, entered the composition of the ministry, headed by António Dias de Oliveira as Minister of Finance. He kept that folded in the next ministry, the presidency of Bernardo de Sá da Bandeira, 1st Baron and Viscount Sá da Bandeira up to 17 April 1838. He had for that time as Internal Minister of Seas and Overseas from 25 October to 9 November 1837, and Minister to the King from 9 to 21 March 1838. He was the new Minister of Finance in 1841. During the Maria da Fonte Revolt, he was again Minister of Finance in 1847 and Minister of Foreign Affairs in the last ministry of António Bernardo da Costa Cabral, 1st Count of Tomar from 18 June 1849 to 1851, the latter, the year that overthrew the Regeneration Movement by the state.

He was president of the Lisbon Commercial Association.

== Personal life ==
He never married but left two daughters from a relationship.
