= European Union tax haven blacklist =

European Commission tool against tax avoidance

countries included on the list non-cooperative tax jurisdictions

The European Union tax haven blacklist, officially the EU list of non-cooperative tax jurisdictions, is a tool of the European Union (EU) that lists tax havens. It is used by the Member States to tackle external risks of tax abuse and unfair tax competition. It was adopted for the first time in 2017 as a response to tax avoidance in the EU, screening 92 countries. It is managed by the Code of Conduct Group for Business Taxation and monitored by the European Commission (EC). The most recent revision was released on 17 February 2026. The list is updated twice a year.

== Criteria for listing and history ==
=== Criteria ===
Jurisdictions that do not comply with all three of these EC criteria are flagged as tax havens by the EU:

- Transparency
- Fair Tax Competition
- BEPS implementation (the OECD's Base Erosion and Profit Shifting minimum standards)

=== History ===
The original list in 2017 contained additional countries. Of these, 25 countries have been cleared and removed from the list by March 2019: Andorra, Bahrain, Faroe Islands, Greenland, Grenada, Guernsey, Hong Kong, Isle of Man, Jamaica, Jersey, Korea, Liechtenstein, Macao SAR, Malaysia, Montserrat, New Caledonia, Panama, Peru, Qatar, San Marino, Saint Vincent and the Grenadines, Taiwan, Tunisia, Turks and Caicos, and Uruguay. An additional 34 countries that have committed to compliance by the end of 2019, and form a "grey list": Albania, Anguilla, Antigua and Barbuda, Armenia, Australia, Bahamas, Bosnia and Herzegovina, Botswana, British Virgin Islands, Cabo Verde, Costa Rica, Curaçao, Cayman Islands, Cook Islands, Eswatini, Jordan, Maldives, Mauritius, Morocco, Mongolia, Montenegro, Namibia, North Macedonia, Nauru, Niue, Palau, Saint Kitts and Nevis, Saint Lucia, Serbia, Seychelles, Switzerland, Thailand, Turkey, and Vietnam.

A number of countries have not yet been screened: In 2019 Russia, Mexico and Argentina are scheduled to be screened. Other countries are planned to be brought into the scope from 2020 onwards.

On 27 March 2019, the European Parliament voted by 505 in favour to 63 against of accepting a new report that likened Luxembourg, Malta, Ireland and the Netherlands, and Cyprus to "display[ing] traits of a tax haven and facilitate aggressive tax planning". However, despite this vote, the EU Commission is not obliged to include these EU jurisdictions on the blacklist.

On 17 October 2023, the European Union added Antigua and Barbuda, Belize and the Seychelles to its blacklist of tax havens. At the same time, they removed the British Virgin Islands, Costa Rica and the Marshall Islands from the list of non-cooperative tax jurisdictions.

On 9 October 2026, Vietnam and Panama are moved from the blacklist to the grey list.

== List ==
=== Current listed jurisdictions ===
Following the latest revision in February 2026, the EU blacklist includes the following ten jurisdictions: American Samoa, Anguilla, Guam, Palau, Panama, Russia, Turks and Caicos Islands, US Virgin Islands, Vanuatu and Vietnam. In the February 2023 update, British Virgin Islands, Costa Rica, Marshall Islands and Russia were added and North Macedonia, Barbados, Jamaica and Uruguay were removed. In the 2021 update, Dominica was added to the blacklist and Barbados was moved to the grey list, pending a supplementary review by the Global Forum.

Non-cooperative jurisdictions	Type of jurisdiction	Reasons for blacklisting
American Samoa	Unincorporated and unorganized U.S. territory	American Samoa does not apply any automatic exchange of financial information, has not signed and ratified, including through the jurisdiction they are dependent on, the OECD Multilateral Convention on Mutual Administrative Assistance as amended, did not commit to apply the BEPS minimum standards and did not commit to addressing these issues.
Anguilla	British Overseas Territory	This is due to the Global Forum on Transparency and Exchange of Information for Tax Purposes (the international standards for the exchange of information on request) downgrading the ratings of this jurisdiction to “non-compliant”
Guam	Unincorporated and organized U.S. territory	Guam does not apply any automatic exchange of financial information, has not signed and ratified, including through the jurisdiction they are dependent on, the OECD Multilateral Convention on Mutual Administrative Assistance as amended, did not commit to apply the BEPS minimum standards and did not commit to addressing these issues.
Palau	Country	Palau does not apply any automatic exchange of financial information, has not signed and ratified the OECD Multilateral Convention on Mutual Administrative Assistance as amended, and has not resolved these issues yet.
Russia	Country	Code of conduct group screened Russia’s new legislation adopted in 2022 against the good tax governance criteria of the code and found that Russia had not fulfilled its commitment to address the harmful aspects of a special regime for international holding companies (criterion 2.1). In addition, dialogue with Russia on matters related to taxation came to a standstill following the Russian aggression against Ukraine.
Turks and Caicos Islands	British Overseas Territory	The OECD forum on harmful tax practices raised concerns regarding the enforcement of economic substance requirements in the Turks and Caicos Islands.
U.S. Virgin Islands	Unincorporated and organized U.S. territory	US Virgin Islands does not apply any automatic exchange of financial information, has not signed and ratified, including through the jurisdiction they are dependent on, the OECD Multilateral Convention on Mutual Administrative Assistance as amended, has harmful preferential tax regimes, did not commit to apply the BEPS minimum standards and did not commit to addressing these issues.
Vanuatu	Country	Vanuatu does not have a rating of at least “Largely Compliant” by the Global Forum on Transparency and Exchange of Information for Tax Purposes for Exchange of Information on Request, facilitates offshore structures and arrangements aimed at attracting profits without real economic substance and has not resolved these issues yet.

== Sanctions ==
On 16 December 2019, the EU Code of Conduct Group (Business Taxation) (CCG), under the Economic and Financial Affairs Council, published a new guidance on sanctions to be applied by EU Member States against blacklisted 'non-cooperative' jurisdictions by the end of 2020. These sanctions were immediately backed by the Finnish Presidency of the Council of the European Union called such sanctions as "defensive-measures" that are recommended to EU Member States to take against blacklisted jurisdictions.

These defensive-measures entail:

- denying deduction of costs and payments that otherwise would be deductible, when these costs and payments are treated as directed to entities or persons in blacklisted jurisdictions;
- including in the taxpayer company's tax base the income of an entity resident or a permanent establishment situated in a blacklisted jurisdiction, in accordance with the Anti-Tax Avoidance Directive rules for controlled foreign companies;
- applying a withholding tax at a higher rate on payments such as interest, royalties, service fee or remuneration, when these payments are treated as received in blacklisted jurisdictions; and
- for those Member States with rules that permit excluding or deducting dividends or other profits received from foreign subsidiaries, denying or limiting these 'participation exemptions' if the dividends or other profits are treated as received from a blacklisted jurisdiction.

Member States are requested to apply at least one of these measures from 1 January 2021 at the latest. Furthermore, Member States are entitled to apply their own additional measures or to maintain their own lists of non-cooperative jurisdictions at the national level.

By the end of 2021, an overview of sanctions applied by Member States will take place, and as of 2022, the CCG will assess the need for further coordination of defensive measures.

== See also ==
- European company law
- Common Consolidated Corporate Tax Base
- Corporate haven
