= Sebastião Lopes de Calheiros e Meneses =

Portuguese colonial administrator

Colonial governor of Cape Verde
- In office 28 March 1858 – June 1860
- Preceded by: António Maria Barreiros Arrobas
- Succeeded by: Januário Correia de Almeidà

Colonial governor of Angola
- In office February 1861 – September 1862
- Preceded by: Carlos Augusto Franco
- Succeeded by: José Baptista de Andrade

Personal details
- Born: 24 January 1816 Geraz do Lima, Viana do Castelo
- Died: 20 November 1899 (aged 83)

Sebastião Lopes de Calheiros e Meneses (24 January 1816 – 20 November 1899) was a Portuguese colonial administrator. He was the governor of Cape Verde and of Angola. He was born on 24 January 1816 in Geraz do Lima, northern Portugal. His father was Pedro Lopes de Calheiros e Meneses. He succeeded António Maria Barreiros Arrobas as governor of Cape Verde on 28 March 1858, and was succeeded by Januário Correia de Almeida in June 1860. He succeeded Carlos Augusto Franco as governor of Angola in February 1861, and was succeeded by José Baptista de Andrade in September 1862. He was Minister of Public Works in the government of Sá da Bandeira (1868-1869). He died in Viana do Castelo on 20 November 1899.

== See also ==
- List of colonial governors of Cape Verde
- List of colonial governors of Angola

Preceded by António Maria Barreiros Arrobas	Colonial governor of Cape Verde; 1857-1860	Succeeded by Januário Correia de Almeida
Preceded by Carlos Augusto Franco	Colonial governor of Angola; 1861-1862	Succeeded by José Baptista de Andrade
