= Verena Ross =

German economist

Verena Bettina Ross
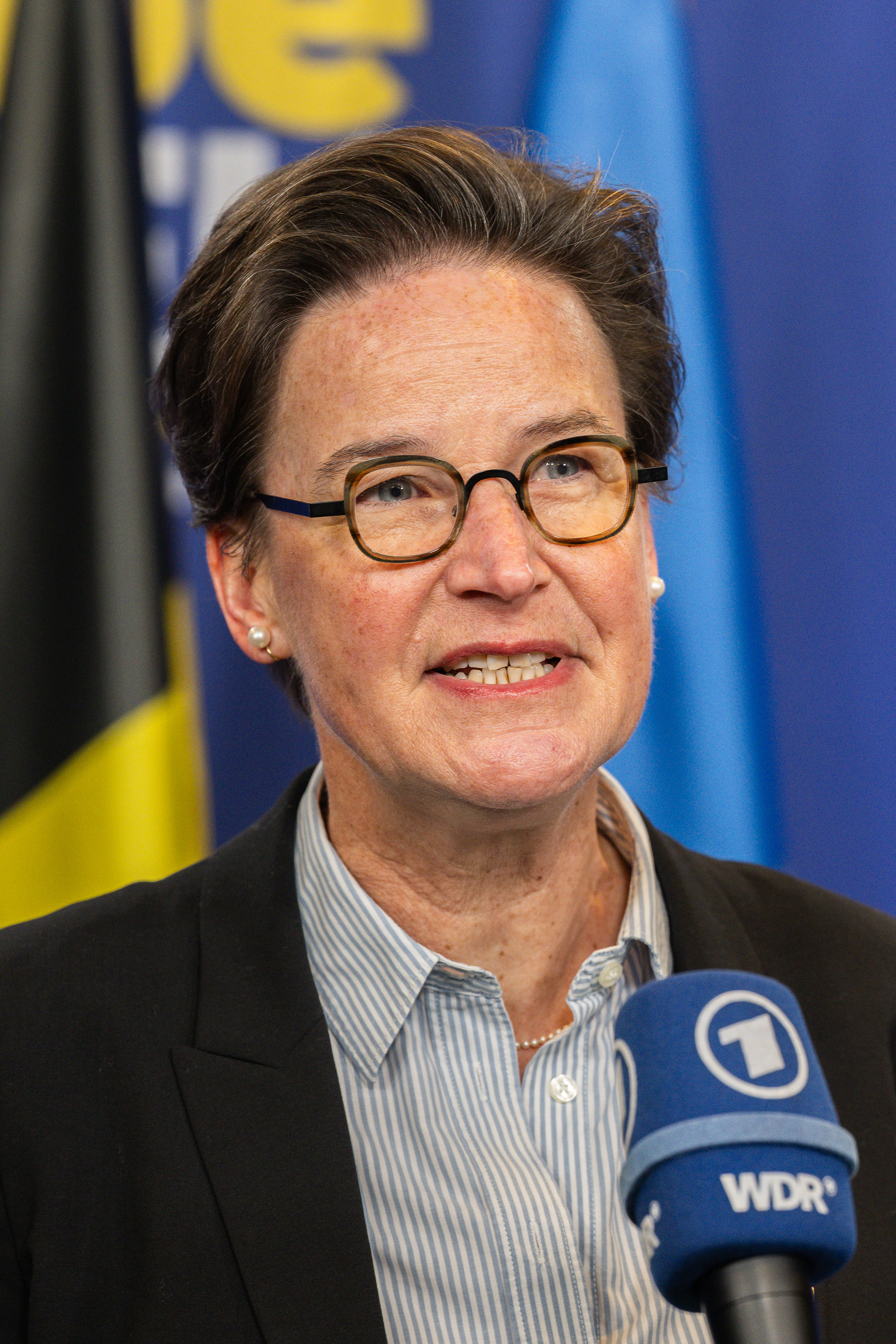
- Born: 4 March 1968 (age 58)
- Education: School of Oriental and African Studies, University of London
- Occupation: Economist
- Known for: Chair of the European Securities and Markets Authority (ESMA)

Verena Bettina Ross (born 4 March 1968) is a German economist. She is President of the European Securities and Markets Authority (ESMA) until Nov 1, 2026, when Carlo Comporti will take the lead.

== Biography ==
Verena Ross studied economics at the School of Oriental and African Studies, University of London.

She began her career at the Bank of England. She then served as chief of staff to Howard Davies, the first chairman of the Financial Services Authority (FSA), upon its establishment in 2000. She became an executive director in June 2011, and then president of the European Securities and Markets Authority in 2021. In 2011, she was the preferred candidate of the City of London.

In 2023, she warned about the risks associated with collateral and highlighted ESMA's lack of resources to regulate cryptocurrencies and their impact on financial markets.

In December 2025, Verena Ross announced that she will not seek a second mandate as chair of ESMA and will therefore step down at end of her term, in October 2026. Carlo Comporti was announced on October 9th, 2026.
