= Ministry of Finance (Portugal) =

Government ministry of Portugal

Ministry of State and Finance
- Ministério de Estado e das Finanças
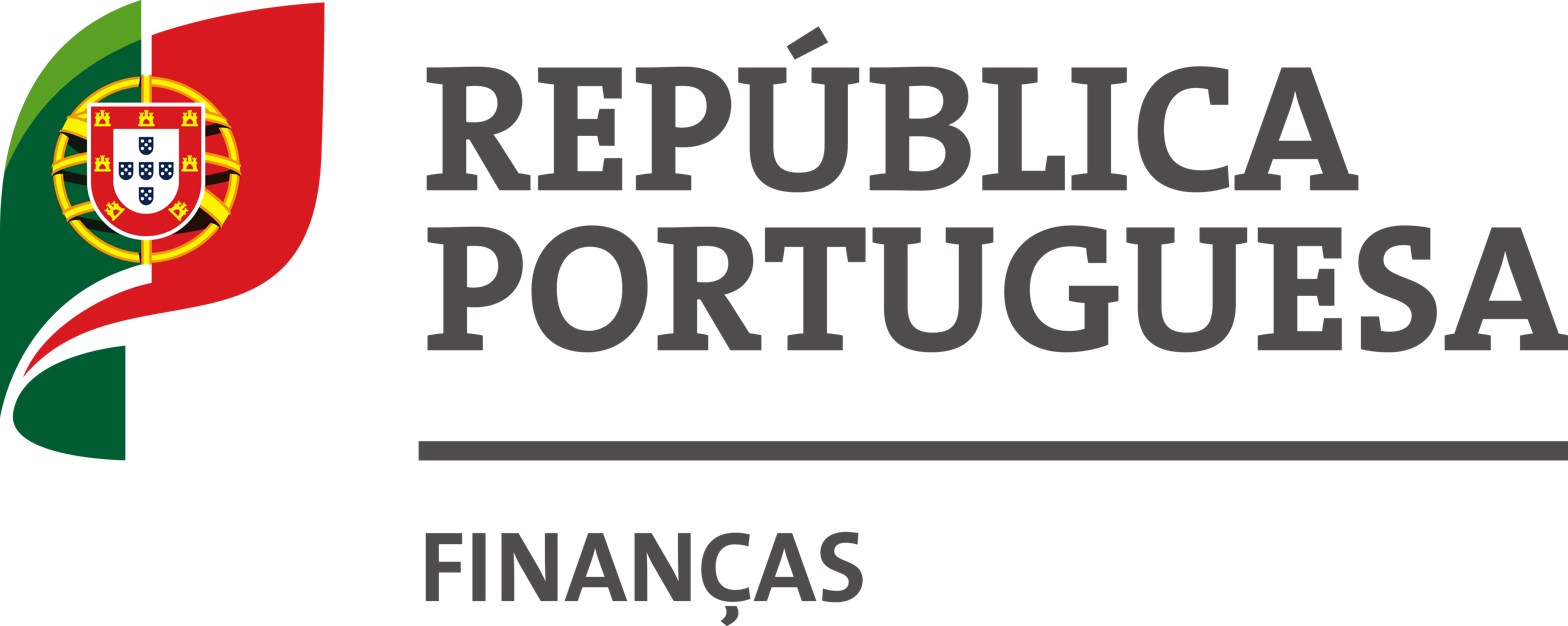
- Logo of the Ministry of Finance

- Flag of the minister of finance

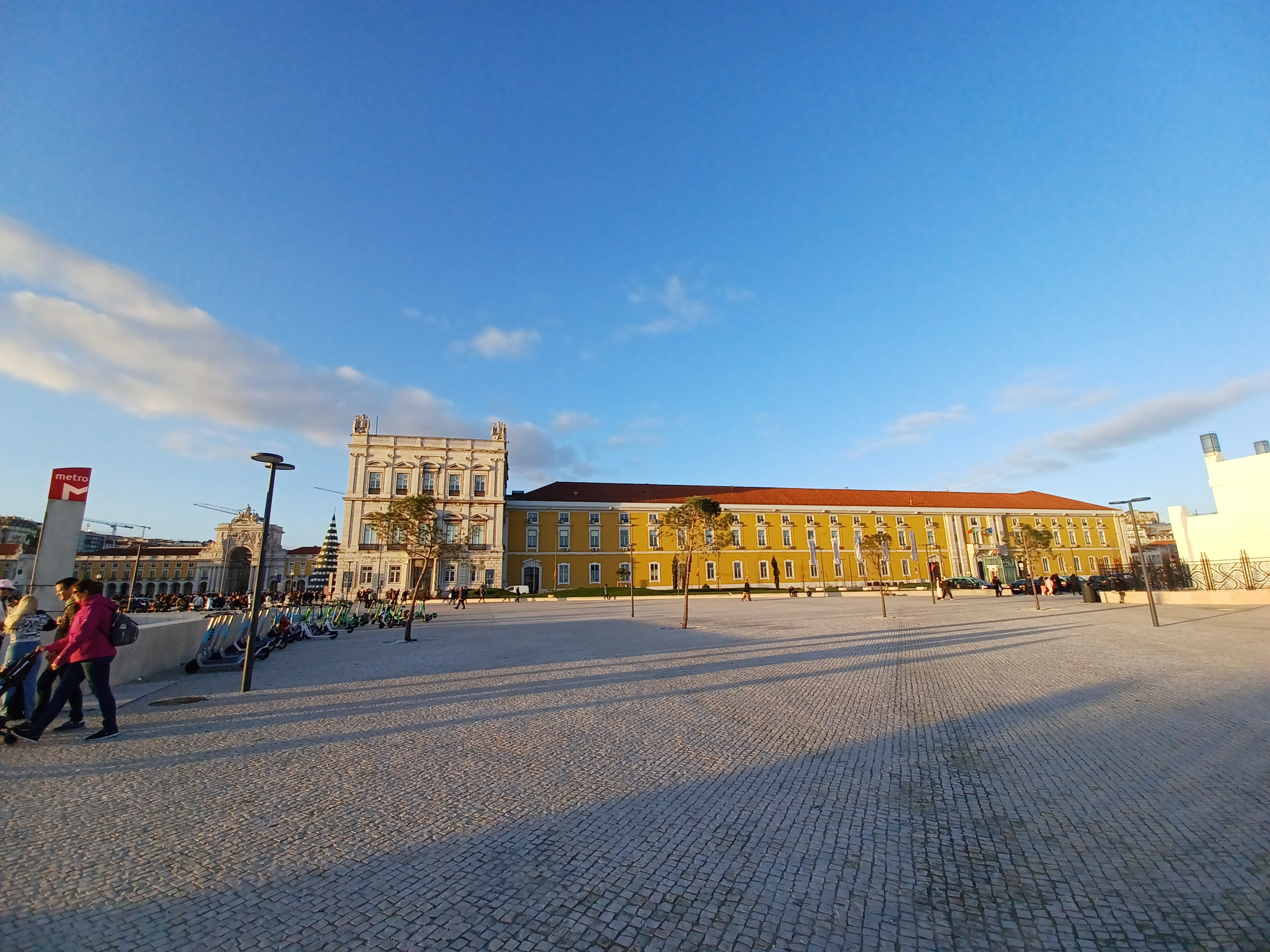
- Headquarters of the Ministry of Finance in Lisbon

Ministry overview
- Formed: 15 December 1788; 237 years ago
- Preceding Ministry: Royal Treasury
- Type: Ministry of finance
- Jurisdiction: Government of Portugal
- Headquarters: Avenida Infante D. Henrique 1, Lisbon, Portugal; 38°42′27.5904″N 9°8′1.9932″W
- Ministry executives: Joaquim Miranda Sarmento, Minister of State and Finance; José Maria Brandão de Brito, Deputy Minister and for the Budget; Cláudia Reis Duarte, Secretary of State for Tax Affairs; João Silva Lopes, Secretary of State for Tresaury and for Finance; Marisa Garrido, Secretary of State for Public Administration
- Child agencies: Tax and Customs Authority; Imprensa Nacional-Casa da Moeda; Parpública; Portuguese Securities Market Commission; Insurance and Pension Funds Supervisory Authority
- Website: Portal das Finanças

The Ministry of Finance, (Note: Portuguese: Ministério das Finanças) officially the Ministry of State and Finance, is a Portuguese government ministry.

== History ==
The Ministry of Finance has its origins on the Comptrollerships of the Exchequer (vedorias da Fazenda) created in the 14th century to run the State's financial affairs. After 1584, the comptrollerships are replaced by the Council of the Court of the Exchequer (Conselho do Tribunal da Fazenda). In 1761, the Royal Treasury (Erário Régio) is created, and it becomes the central department of State Finance.

The modern Ministry of Finance is created in 1788, then under the designation of Secretary of State for the Affairs of the Exchequer (Secretaria de Estado dos Negócios da Fazenda). In 1849, it turns into the Ministry of the Exchequer Affairs (Ministério dos Negócios da Fazenda), or simply Ministry of the Exchequer (Ministério da Fazenda).

In 1910, following the republican coup d'état, the department is renamed Ministry of Finance (Ministério das Finanças). Since then, the ministry has almost always kept that name, except for some brief periods in which it was called Ministry of Finance and Economic Coordination (Ministério das Finanças e da Coordenação Económica) in March–May 1974, Ministry of Economic Coordination (Ministério da Coordenação Económica) in May–June 1974, Ministry of Finance and Planning (Ministério das Finanças e do Plano) in 1980–1983, or Ministry of Finance and Public Administration (Ministério das Finanças e Administração Pública) in 2002–2005.

== List of Ministers ==
Colour key
(for political parties)
National Union (UN)
People's National Action (ANP)
Socialist Party (PS)
Independent Social Democratic Action (ASDI)
Social Democratic Party (PSD)
Democratic and Social Center (CDS)
Independent (Ind.)

=== Regency of Pedro IV (1830–1834) ===
#	Portrait	Minister	Start of Term	End of term
1		Luís da Silva Mouzinho de Albuquerque (1792–1846)	15 March 1830	14 January 1831
–		António César de Vasconcelos Correia (interim) (1797–1865)	14 January 1831	2 July 1831
2		José António Ferreira Brak-Lamy (1780–1847)	2 July 1831	10 October 1831
3		José Dionísio da Serra (1772–1836)	10 October 1831	3 March 1832
4		Mouzinho da Silveira (1780–1849)	3 March 1832	3 December 1832
5		José da Silva Carvalho (interim until 12 January 1833) (1782–1856)	3 December 1832	24 September 1834

=== Constitutional Monarchy (1834–1910) ===
#	Portrait	Minister	Start of Term	End of term
–		José da Silva Carvalho (continuance) (1782–1856)	24 September 1834	27 May 1835
6		Francisco António de Campos Henriques (1780–1873)	27 May 1835	15 July 1835
7		José da Silva Carvalho (1782–1856)	15 July 1835	18 November 1835
8		Francisco António de Campos Henriques (1780–1873)	18 November 1835	6 April 1836
9		José Jorge Loureiro (interim) (1791–1860)	6 April 1836	20 April 1836
10		José da Silva Carvalho (1782–1856)	20 April 1836	10 September 1836
11		Bernardo de Sá Nogueira de Figueiredo, 1st Marquis of Sá da Bandeira (1795–1876)	10 September 1836	4 November 1836
–		Joaquim da Costa Bandeira, Viscount Porto Covo (not installed) (1796–1856)	4 November 1836	6 November 1836
12		Manuel da Silva Passos "Manuel" (interim) (1801–1862)	6 November 1836	1 June 1837
13		João Gualberto de Oliveira (1788–1852)	1 June 1837	17 April 1838
14		Manuel António de Carvalho (interim) (1785–1858)	17 April 1838	26 November 1839
15		Flórido Rodrigues Pereira Ferraz (1790–1862)	26 November 1839	28 January 1841
16		Manuel Gonçalves de Miranda (1780–1841)	28 January 1841	12 March 1841
17		João Gualberto de Oliveira, Barão do Tojal (1788–1852)	12 March 1841	9 June 1841
18		António José de Ávila (interim from 7 February 1842) (1807–1881)	9 June 1841	8 February 1842
–		Junta Provisória de Governo; António Bernardo da Costa Cabral; António Vicente de Queirós, Barão da Ponte de Santa Maria; Marcelino Máximo de Azevedo e Melo; António Pereira dos Reis	8 February 1842	9 February 1842
19		José Jorge Loureiro (1791–1860)	9 February 1842	24 February 1842
20		João Gualberto de Oliveira, Barão do Tojal (1788–1852)	24 February 1842	20 May 1846
21		Pedro de Sousa Holstein, 1st Duke of Palmela (interim until 26 May) (1781–1850)	20 May 1846	19 July 1846
22		Júlio Gomes da Silva Sanches (1803–1866)	19 July 1846	6 October 1846
23		Marcelino Máximo de Azevedo e Melo, Viscount Oliveira do Douro (interim) (1794–1853)	6 October 1846	13 October 1846
24		José António de Sousa Azevedo, Viscount Algés (interim) (1796–1865)	13 October 1846	20 February 1847
25		João Gualberto de Oliveira, Count Tojal (1788–1852)	20 February 1847	22 August 1847
26		Marino Miguel Franzini (1779–1861)	22 August 1847	18 December 1847
27		Joaquim José Falcão (1796–1863)	18 December 1847	29 January 1849
28		António Roberto de Oliveira Lopes Branco (1808–1889)	29 January 1849	18 June 1849
29		António José de Ávila (1807–1881)	18 June 1849	1 May 1851
30		Marino Miguel Franzini (interim until 22 May) (1779–1861)	1 May 1851	5 August 1851
31		Francisco António Fernandes da Silva Ferrão (1798–1874)	5 August 1851	21 August 1851
32		António Maria de Fontes Pereira de Melo (interim until 4 March 1852) (1819–1887)	21 August 1851	8 November 1855
–		Frederico Guilherme da Silva Pereira (interim) (1806–1871)	8 November 1855	3 January 1856
–		António Maria de Fontes Pereira de Melo (continuance) (1819–1887)	3 January 1856	6 June 1856
33		José Jorge Loureiro (interim) (1791–1860)	6 June 1856	23 January 1857
34		Júlio Gomes da Silva Sanches (1803–1866)	23 January 1857	14 March 1857
35		António José de Ávila (1807–1881)	14 March 1857	16 March 1859
36		José Maria Caldeira do Casal Ribeiro (1825–1896)	16 March 1859	4 July 1860
37		António José de Ávila (1807–1881)	4 July 1860	21 February 1862
38		Joaquim Tomás Lobo de Ávila (1822–1901)	21 February 1862	5 March 1865
39		Matias de Carvalho e Vasconcelos (1832–1910)	5 March 1865	17 April 1865
40		António José de Ávila, Count Ávila (1807–1881)	17 April 1865	4 September 1865
41		António Maria de Fontes Pereira de Melo (1819–1887)	4 September 1865	4 January 1868
42		José Dias Ferreira (1837–1909)	4 January 1868	22 July 1868
43		Carlos Bento da Silva (1812–1891)	22 July 1868	18 November 1868
–		Sebastião Lopes de Calheiros e Meneses (interim) (1816–1899)	18 November 1868	9 December 1868
–		Carlos Bento da Silva (continuance) (1812–1891)	9 December 1868	17 December 1868
44		Sebastião Lopes de Calheiros e Meneses (interim) (1816–1899)	17 December 1868	27 December 1868
45		Francisco de Azeredo Teixeira de Aguilar, Count Samodães (1828–1918)	27 December 1868	2 August 1869
46		Augusto Saraiva de Carvalho (1839–1882)	2 August 1869	11 August 1869
47		Anselmo José Braamcamp de Almeida Castelo Branco (1817–1885)	11 August 1869	20 May 1870
48		João Carlos de Saldanha Oliveira e Daun, 1st Duke of Saldanha (interim) (1790–1876)	20 May 1870	26 May 1870
49		José Dias Ferreira (1837–1909)	26 May 1870	4 July 1870
50		António Joaquim Vieira de Magalhães, Count Magalhães (1822–1903)	4 July 1870	29 August 1870
51		António José de Ávila, Marquês de Ávila e Bolama (1807–1881)	29 August 1870	12 September 1870
52		Carlos Bento da Silva (interim until 29 October 1870) (1812–1891)	12 September 1870	13 September 1871
53		António Maria de Fontes Pereira de Melo (1819–1887)	13 September 1871	15 January 1872
–		António Cardoso Avelino (interim) (1822–1889)	15 January 1872	28 January 1872
–		António Maria de Fontes Pereira de Melo (1819–1887)	28 January 1872	11 October 1872
54		António de Serpa Pimentel (1825–1900)	11 October 1872	5 March 1877
55		Carlos Bento da Silva (1812–1891)	5 March 1877	10 September 1877
56		José Eduardo de Melo Gouveia (interim) (1815–1893)	10 September 1877	29 January 1878
57		António de Serpa Pimentel (1825–1900)	29 January 1878	1 June 1879
58		Henrique de Barros Gomes (1843–1898)	1 June 1879	25 March 1881
59		Lopo Vaz de Sampaio e Melo (1848–1892)	25 March 1881	31 August 1881
–		António José de Barros e Sá (interim) (1821–1903)	1 September 1881	3 October 1881
–		Lopo Vaz de Sampaio e Melo (continuance) (1848–1892)	3 October 1881	14 November 1881
60		António Maria de Fontes Pereira de Melo (1819–1887)	14 November 1881	21 May 1883
–		Júlio Marques de Vilhena (interim) (1845–1928)	21 May 1883	31 May 1883
–		António Maria de Fontes Pereira de Melo (1819–1887)	31 May 1883	24 October 1883
61		Ernesto Rodolfo Hintze Ribeiro (1849–1907)	24 October 1883	20 February 1886
62		Mariano Cirilo de Carvalho (1836–1905)	20 February 1886	23 February 1889
63		Henrique de Barros Gomes (1843–1898)	23 February 1889	9 November 1889
64		Augusto José da Cunha (1834–1919)	9 November 1889	14 January 1890
65		João Ferreira Franco Pinto Castelo Branco (1855–1929)	14 January 1890	13 October 1890
66		José Eduardo de Melo Gouveia (1815–1893)	13 October 1890	24 November 1890
67		Augusto José da Cunha (1834–1919)	24 November 1890	21 May 1891
68		Mariano Cirilo de Carvalho (1836–1905)	21 May 1891	23 May 1891
–		Alberto António de Morais Carvalho, filho (interim) (1853–1932)	23 May 1891	9 June 1891
–		Mariano Cirilo de Carvalho (1836–1905)	9 June 1891	17 January 1892
69		Joaquim Pedro de Oliveira Martins (1845–1894)	17 January 1892	27 May 1892
70		José Dias Ferreira (1837–1909)	27 May 1892	9 November 1892
–		Pedro Vítor da Costa Sequeira (interim) (1846–1905)	9 November 1892	18 November 1892
–		José Dias Ferreira (1837–1909)	18 November 1892	22 February 1893
71		Augusto Maria Fuschini (1843–1911)	22 February 1893	20 December 1893
72		Ernesto Rodolfo Hintze Ribeiro (1849–1907)	20 December 1893	7 February 1897
73		Frederico Ressano Garcia (1847–1911)	7 February 1897	18 August 1898
–		António Eduardo Vilaça (interino) (1852–1914)	18 August 1898	4 September 1898
74		Manuel Afonso de Espregueira (1835–1917)	4 September 1898	25 June 1900
75		Anselmo José Franco de Assis de Andrade (1844–1928)	25 June 1900	30 November 1900
76		Fernando Matoso dos Santos (1849–1921)	30 November 1900	28 February 1903
77		António Teixeira de Sousa (1857–1917)	28 February 1903	26 March 1904
78		Rodrigo Afonso Pequito (1849–1931)	26 March 1904	20 October 1904
79		Manuel Afonso de Espregueira (1835–1917)	20 October 1904	27 December 1905
80		José Capelo Franco Frazão, Count Penha Garcia (1872–1940)	27 December 1905	20 March 1906
81		António Teixeira de Sousa (1857–1917)	20 March 1906	19 May 1906
82		Ernesto Driesel Schröeter (1850–1942)	19 May 1906	2 May 1907
83		Fernando Augusto de Miranda Martins de Carvalho (1872–1947)	2 May 1907	4 February 1908
84		Manuel Afonso de Espregueira (1835–1917)	4 February 1908	11 April 1909
85		João Soares Branco (1863–1927)	11 April 1909	14 de May 1909
86		Francisco de Paula de Azeredo Teixeira de Aguilar (1859–1940)	14 May 1909	22 December 1909
87		João Soares Branco (1863–1927)	22 December 1909	26 June 1910
88		Anselmo José Franco de Assis de Andrade (1844–1928)	26 June 1910	5 October 1910

=== First Republic (1910–1926) ===
#	Portrait	Minister	Start of Term	End of term
–		Basílio Teles (not installed) (1856–1923)	5 October 1910	12 October 1910
89		José Carlos de Azevedo Mascarenhas Relvas (1858–1929)	12 October 1910	3 September 1911
90		Duarte Leite Pereira da Silva (1864–1950)	4 September 1911	12 November 1911
91		Sidónio Bernardino Cardoso da Silva Pais (1872–1918)	12 November 1911	16 June 1912
92		António Vicente Ferreira (1874–1953)	16 June 1912	31 August 1912
–		Francisco José de Meneses Fernandes Costa (interim) (1857–1925)	31 August 1912	26 September 1912
–		António Vicente Ferreira (continuance) (1874–1953)	26 September 1912	9 January 1913
93		Afonso Augusto da Costa (1871–1937)	9 January 1913	9 February 1914
94		Tomás António da Guarda Cabreira (1865–1918)	9 February 1914	23 June 1914
95		António dos Santos Lucas (1866–1939)	23 June 1914	12 December 1914
96		Álvaro Xavier de Castro (1878–1928)	12 December 1914	25 January 1915
97		José Joaquim Pereira Pimenta de Castro (interim) (1846–1918)	25 January 1915	28 January 1915
98		Herculano Jorge Galhardo (1868–1944)	28 January 1915	6 March 1915
99		José Jerónimo Rodrigues Monteiro (interim between March 6 and 10) (1855–1931)	6 March 1915	29 April 1915
–		José Maria Teixeira Guimarães (interim) (1845–1915)	29 April 1915	14 May 1915
–		Junta Constitucional José Maria Mendes Ribeiro Norton de Matos; António Maria da Silva; José de Freitas Ribeiro; Alfredo Ernesto de Sá Cardoso; Álvaro Xavier de Castro	14 May 1915	15 May 1915
100		Tomé José de Barros Queirós (1872–1925)	15 May 1915	19 June 1915
101		Vitorino Máximo de Carvalho Guimarães (1876–1957)	19 June 1915	29 November 1915
102		Afonso Augusto da Costa (1871–1937)	29 November 1915	12 June 1916
–		António José de Almeida (interim) (1866–1929)	12 June 1916	8 August 1916
–		Afonso Augusto da Costa (1871–1937)	8 August 1916	31 March 1917
–		António José de Almeida (interim) (1866–1929)	31 March 1917	31 March 1917
–		Afonso Augusto da Costa (1871–1937)	unknown	7 October 1917
–		Artur Rodrigues de Almeida Ribeiro (interim) (1865–1943)	7 October 1917	25 October 1917
–		Afonso Augusto da Costa (1871–1937)	25 October 1917	19 November 1917
–		Artur Rodrigues de Almeida Ribeiro (interim) (1865–1943)	19 November 1917	8 December 1917
–		Junta Revolucionária Sidónio Bernardino Cardoso da Silva Pais (Presidente); António Maria de Azevedo Machado Santos (Vogal); José Feliciano da Costa Júnior (Vogal)	8 December 1917	11 December 1917
103		António dos Santos Viegas (1870–1949)	11 December 1917	7 March 1918
104		Francisco Xavier Esteves (1864–1944)	7 March 1918	15 May 1918
–		Francisco Xavier Esteves (continuance) (1864–1944)	15 May 1918	1 June 1918
105		Joaquim Mendes da Costa do Amaral (interim) (1889–1961)	1 June 1918	8 October 1918
106		João Tamagnini de Sousa Barbosa (1883–1948)	8 October 1918	16 December 1918
–		João Tamagnini de Sousa Barbosa (continuance) (1883–1948)	16 December 1918	23 December 1918
107		Ventura Malheiro Reimão (1886–1965)	23 December 1918	27 January 1919
108		António de Paiva Gomes (1878–1939)	27 January 1919	15 February 1919
–		Augusto Dias da Silva (interim) (1887–1928)	15 February 1919	unknown (before 24 February 1919)
–		António de Paiva Gomes (continuance) (1878–1939)	unknown (before 24 February 1919)	30 March 1919
109		Amílcar da Silva Ramada Curto (1886–1961)	30 March 1919	29 June 1919
110		Francisco da Cunha Rego Chaves (1881–1941)	29 June 1919	3 January 1920
111		António Maria da Silva (1872–1950)	3 January 1920	15 January 1920
–		Francisco José de Meneses Fernandes Costa (not installed) (1857–1925)	15 January 1920	15 January 1920
–		António Maria da Silva (reconduzido) (1872–1950)	15 January 1920	21 January 1920
112		António Joaquim Ferreira da Fonseca (1887–1937)	21 January 1920	8 March 1920
113		Francisco de Pina Esteves Lopes (1874–1962)	8 March 1920	26 June 1920
114		António Maria da Silva (1872–1950)	26 June 1920	19 July 1920
115		Inocêncio Joaquim Camacho Rodrigues (1867–1943)	19 July 1920	14 September 1920
–		António Joaquim Granjo (interim) (1881–1921)	14 September 1920	18 October 1920
–		Inocêncio Joaquim Camacho Rodrigues (continuance) (1867–1943)	18 October 1920	20 November 1920
116		Francisco Pinto da Cunha Leal (1888–1970)	20 November 1920	22 February 1921
117		Liberato Damião Ribeiro Pinto (interim) (1880–1949)	22 February 1921	2 March 1921
118		António Maria da Silva (1872–1950)	2 March 1921	23 May 1921
119		Tomé José de Barros Queirós (1872–1925)	23 May 1921	30 August 1921
120		António Vicente Ferreira (1874–1953)	30 August 1921	19 October 1921
121		Francisco António Correia (1877–1938)	19 October 1921	5 November 1921
122		Francisco Xavier Peres Trancoso (1876–1953)	5 November 1921	16 December 1921
123		Vitorino Máximo de Carvalho Guimarães (1876–1957)	16 December 1921	6 February 1922
124		Albano Augusto de Portugal Durão (1871–1925)	6 February 1922	26 August 1922
125		Eduardo Alberto Lima Basto (interim) (1875–1942)	26 August 1922	14 September 1922
126		Vitorino Máximo de Carvalho Guimarães (1876–1957)	14 September 1922	13 August 1923
127		Francisco Gonçalves Velhinho Correia (1882–1943)	13 August 1923	17 August 1923
–		António de Abranches Ferrão (interim) (1883–1932)	17 August 1923	20 August 1923
–		Francisco Gonçalves Velhinho Correia (continuance) (1882–1943)	20 August 1923	24 October 1923
128		João Teixeira de Queirós Vaz Guedes (interim) (1871–1926)	24 October 1923	15 November 1923
129		Francisco Pinto da Cunha Leal (1888–1970)	15 November 1923	18 December 1923
130		Álvaro Xavier de Castro (interim from 18 to 28 December) (1878–1928)	18 December 1923	6 July 1924
131		Daniel José Rodrigues (1877–1951)	6 July 1924	22 November 1924
132		Manuel Gregório Pestana Júnior (1886–1969)	22 November 1924	15 February 1925
133		Vitorino Máximo de Carvalho Guimarães (1876–1957)	15 February 1925	1 July 1925
134		Eduardo Alberto Lima Basto (1875–1942)	1 July 1925	1 August 1925
135		António Alberto Torres Garcia (1889–1937)	1 August 1925	17 December 1925
136		Armando Manuel Marques Guedes (1886–1958)	17 December 1925	29 May 1926

=== Second Republic (1926–1974) ===
#	Portrait	Name	Took office	Left office	Party	Prime Minister
137		José Mendes Cabeçadas (1883–1965)	29 May 1926	3 June 1926	Ind.	José Mendes Cabeçadas
138		António de Oliveira Salazar (1889–1970)	3 June 1926	19 June 1926	Ind.	José Mendes Cabeçadas
139		Filomeno da Câmara (1873–1934)	19 June 1926	9 July 1926	Ind.	Manuel Gomes da Costa
140		João José Sinel de Cordes (1867–1930)	9 July 1926	18 April 1928	Ind.	Óscar Carmona
141		José Vicente de Freitas (1869–1952)	18 April 1928	27 April 1928	Ind.	José Vicente de Freitas
142		António de Oliveira Salazar (1889–1970)	27 April 1928	28 August 1940	Ind.	José Vicente de Freitas
142		António de Oliveira Salazar (1889–1970)	27 April 1928	28 August 1940	Ind.	Artur Ivens Ferraz
142		António de Oliveira Salazar (1889–1970)	27 April 1928	28 August 1940	UN	Domingos Oliveira
142		António de Oliveira Salazar (1889–1970)	27 April 1928	28 August 1940	UN	António de Oliveira Salazar
143		João Lumbrales (1905–1975)	28 August 1940	2 August 1950	UN	António de Oliveira Salazar
144		Artur Águedo de Oliveira (1894–1978)	2 August 1950	7 July 1955	UN	António de Oliveira Salazar
145		António Pinto Barbosa (1917–2006)	7 July 1955	14 June 1965	UN	António de Oliveira Salazar
146		Ulisses Cortês (1901–1975)	14 June 1965	19 August 1968	UN	António de Oliveira Salazar
147		João Dias Rosas (1921–2014)	19 August 1968	11 August 1972	UN	Marcelo Caetano
147		João Dias Rosas (1921–2014)	19 August 1968	11 August 1972	ANP	Marcelo Caetano
148		Manuel Cota Dias (1929–2002)	11 August 1972	25 April 1974	ANP	Marcelo Caetano

=== Third Republic (1974–present) ===
#	Portrait	Name	Took office	Left office	Party	Prime Minister
149		Vasco Vieira de Almeida (b. 1932)	16 May 1974	17 July 1974	Ind.	Adelino da Palma Carlos
150		José da Silva Lopes (1932–2015)	17 July 1974	26 March 1975	Ind.	Vasco Gonçalves
151		José Joaquim Fragoso (b. 1928)	26 March 1975	19 September 1975	Ind.	Vasco Gonçalves
152		Francisco Salgado Zenha (1923–1993)	19 September 1975	23 July 1976	PS	José Pinheiro de Azevedo
153		Henrique Medina Carreira (1931–2017)	23 July 1976	30 January 1978	PS	Mário Soares
154		Vítor Constâncio (b. 1943)	30 January 1978	29 August 1978	PS	Mário Soares
155		José da Silva Lopes (1932–2015)	29 August 1978	22 November 1978	Ind.	Alfredo Nobre da Costa
156		Manuel Jacinto Nunes (1926–2014)	22 November 1978	1 August 1979	Ind.	Carlos Mota Pinto
157		António de Sousa Franco (1942–2004)	1 August 1979	3 January 1980	ASDI	Maria de Lourdes Pintasilgo
158		Aníbal Cavaco Silva (b. 1939)	3 January 1980	9 January 1981	PSD	Francisco Sá Carneiro
158		Aníbal Cavaco Silva (b. 1939)	3 January 1980	9 January 1981	PSD	Diogo Freitas do Amaral
159		João Morais Leitão (1938–2006)	9 January 1981	4 September 1981	CDS	Francisco Pinto Balsemão
160		João Salgueiro (1934–2023)	4 September 1981	9 June 1983	PSD	Francisco Pinto Balsemão
161		Ernâni Lopes (1942–2010)	9 June 1983	6 November 1985	Ind.	Mário Soares
162		Miguel Cadilhe (b. 1944)	6 November 1985	5 January 1990	PSD	Aníbal Cavaco Silva
163		Miguel Beleza (1950–2017)	5 January 1990	31 October 1991	PSD	Aníbal Cavaco Silva
164		Jorge Braga de Macedo (b. 1946)	31 October 1991	7 December 1993	PSD	Aníbal Cavaco Silva
165		Eduardo Catroga (b. 1942)	7 December 1993	28 October 1995	Ind.	Aníbal Cavaco Silva
166		António de Sousa Franco (1942–2004)	28 October 1995	25 October 1999	Ind.	António Guterres
167		Joaquim Pina Moura (1952–2020)	25 October 1999	3 July 2001	PS	António Guterres
168		Guilherme d'Oliveira Martins (b. 1952)	3 July 2001	6 April 2002	Ind.	António Guterres
169		Manuela Ferreira Leite (b. 1940)	6 April 2002	17 July 2004	PSD	José Manuel Durão Barroso
170		António Bagão Félix (b. 1948)	17 July 2004	12 March 2005	Ind.	Pedro Santana Lopes
171		Luís Campos e Cunha (b. 1954)	12 March 2005	21 July 2005	Ind.	José Sócrates
172		Fernando Teixeira dos Santos (b. 1951)	21 July 2005	21 June 2011	Ind.	José Sócrates
173		Vítor Gaspar (b. 1960)	21 June 2011	2 July 2013	Ind.	Pedro Passos Coelho
174		Maria Luís Albuquerque (b. 1967)	2 July 2013	26 November 2015	PSD	Pedro Passos Coelho
175		Mário Centeno (b. 1966)	26 November 2015	15 June 2020	Ind.	António Costa
176		João Leão (b. 1974)	15 June 2020	30 March 2022	Ind.	António Costa
177		Fernando Medina (b. 1973)	30 March 2022	2 April 2024	PS	António Costa
178		Joaquim Miranda Sarmento (b. 1978)	2 April 2024	Incumbent	PSD	Luís Montenegro
