= Ernâni Lopes =

Portuguese economist and politician (1942 - 2010)

Ernâni Rodrigues Lopes (20 February 1942 Lisbon – 2 December 2010) was a Portuguese economist and politician. He served as Portugal's Minister of Finance from 1983 until 1985 in the government of former Prime Minister Mário Soares.

Ernâni Lopes died of lymphoma in Lisbon, Portugal, on 2 December 2010, at the age of 68.
