= XIV Constitutional Government of Portugal =

Cabinet of Portugal between 1999 and 2002, led by António Guterres

- Cabinet of Portugal

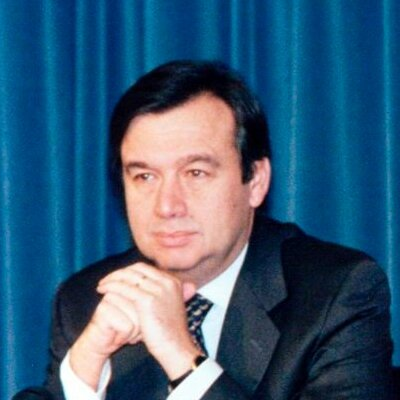
- Prime Minister António Guterres
- Date formed: 25 October 1999
- Date dissolved: 6 April 2002

People and organisations
- President of the Republic: Jorge Sampaio
- Prime Minister: António Guterres
- Member party: Socialist Party (PS)
- Status in legislature: Minority
- Opposition parties: Social Democratic Party (PSD); CDS – People's Party (CDS–PP); Portuguese Communist Party (PCP); Left Bloc (BE); Ecologist Party "The Greens" (PEV)

History
- Elections: 1999 Portuguese legislative election (10 October 1999)
- Predecessor: XIII Constitutional Government of Portugal
- Successor: XV Constitutional Government of Portugal

The XIV Constitutional Government of Portugal (Portuguese: XIV Governo Constitucional de Portugal) was the 14th government of the Third Portuguese Republic, under the Portuguese Constitution of 1976. The government was in office from 25 October 1999 to 6 April 2002 and was formed by members of the Socialist Party (PS), the party with the most votes and elected members for the Assembly of the Republic following the 1999 legislative election. António Guterres, leader of the PS, served as Prime Minister.

== Party breakdown ==
Party breakdown of cabinet ministers by the end of the government's time in office: (Prime Minister not included)

- Socialist Party
- Independents
12
6

== Composition ==
The government was initially composed of the Prime Minister and 21 ministries comprising ministers, secretaries and under-secretaries of state. At the end of the term, the number of ministries was 20.

Ministers of the XIV Constitutional Government of Portugal
Office	Minister	Party	Start of term	End of term
Prime Minister	António Guterres	PS	25 October 1999	6 April 2002
Minister of State and Foreign Affairs	Jaime Gama	PS	25 October 1999	6 April 2002
Minister of State	Jorge Coelho	PS	10 September 2000	10 March 2001
Minister of Presidency	Jorge Coelho	PS	25 October 1999	14 September 2000
Minister of Presidency	Guilherme d'Oliveira Martins	Independent	14 September 2000	6 April 2002
Minister of Social Infrastructure	Jorge Coelho	PS	25 October 1999	10 March 2001
Minister of Social Infrastructure	Eduardo Ferro Rodrigues	PS	10 March 2001	23 January 2002
Minister of Social Infrastructure	José Sócrates	PS	23 January 2002	6 April 2002
Minister of National Defense	Júlio Castro Caldas	Independent	25 October 1999	3 July 2001
Minister of National Defense	Rui Pena	Independent	3 July 2001	6 April 2002
Minister Adjunct	Fernando Gomes	PS	25 October 1999	14 September 2000
Minister of Internal Administration	Fernando Gomes	PS	25 October 1999	14 September 2000
Minister of Internal Administration	Nuno Severiano Teixeira	Independent	14 September 2000	6 April 2002
Minister of Finance	Joaquim Pina Moura	Independent	25 October 1999	3 July 2001
Minister of Finance	Guilherme d'Oliveira Martins	Independent	3 July 2001	6 April 2002
Minister of Economy	Joaquim Pina Moura	Independent	25 October 1999	14 September 2000
Minister of Economy	Mário Cristina de Sousa	Independent	14 September 2000	3 July 2001
Minister of Economy	Luís Braga da Cruz	PS	3 July 2001	6 April 2002
Minister of Labour and Solidarity	Eduardo Ferro Rodrigues	PS	25 October 1999	10 March 2001
Minister of Labour and Solidarity	Paulo Pedroso	PS	10 March 2001	6 April 2002
Minister of Justice	António Costa	PS	25 October 1999	6 April 2002
Minister of Planning	Elisa Ferreira	Independent	25 October 1999	6 April 2002
Minister of Agriculture, Rural Development and Fisheries	Luís Capoulas Santos	PS	25 October 1999	6 April 2002
Minister of Education	Guilherme d'Oliveira Martins	Independent	25 October 1999	14 September 2000
Minister of Education	Augusto Santos Silva	PS	14 September 2000	3 July 2001
Minister of Education	Júlio Pedrosa	Independent	3 July 2001	6 April 2002
Minister of Health	Manuela Arcanjo	PS	25 October 1999	3 July 2001
Minister of Health	António Correia de Campos	PS	3 July 2001	6 April 2002
Minister of the Environment and Territorial Planning	José Sócrates	PS	25 October 1999	6 April 2002
Minister of Culture	Manuel Maria Carrilho	PS	25 October 1999	12 July 2000
Minister of Culture	José Sasportes	Independent	12 July 2000	3 July 2001
Minister of Culture	Augusto Santos Silva	PS	3 July 2001	6 April 2002
Minister of Science and Technology	Mariano Gago	Independent	25 October 1999	6 April 2002
Minister of State Reform and Public Administration	Alberto Martins	PS	25 October 1999	6 April 2002
Minister for Equality	Maria de Belém Roseira	PS	25 October 1999	14 September 2000
Minister of Youth and Sports	Armando Vara	PS	14 September 2000	18 December 2000
Minister of Youth and Sports	José Lello	PS	18 December 2000	6 April 2002
Assistant Minister to the Prime Minister (Ministro Adjunto do Primeiro-Ministro)	Armando Vara	PS	25 October 1999	14 September 2000
Assistant Minister to the Prime Minister (Ministro Adjunto do Primeiro-Ministro)	António José Seguro	PS	3 July 2001	6 April 2002
