= XIII Constitutional Government of Portugal =

Cabinet of Portugal between 1995 and 1999, led by António Guterres

- Cabinet of Portugal

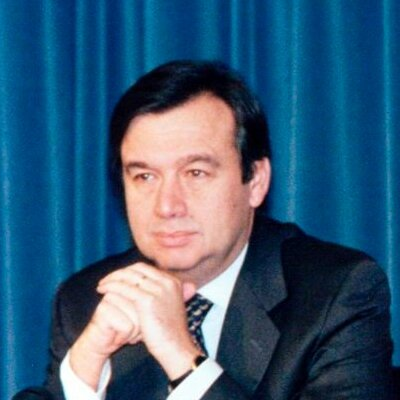
- Prime Minister António Guterres
- Date formed: 28 October 1995
- Date dissolved: 25 October 1999

People and organisations
- President of the Republic: Mário Soares; Jorge Sampaio
- Prime Minister: António Guterres
- Member party: Socialist Party (PS)
- Status in legislature: Minority
- Opposition parties: Social Democratic Party (PSD); CDS – People's Party (CDS–PP); Portuguese Communist Party (PCP); Ecologist Party "The Greens" (PEV)

History
- Elections: 1995 Portuguese legislative election (1 October 1995)
- Predecessor: XII Constitutional Government of Portugal
- Successor: XIV Constitutional Government of Portugal

The XIII Constitutional Government of Portugal (Portuguese: XIII Governo Constitucional de Portugal) was the 13th government of the Third Portuguese Republic, under the Portuguese Constitution of 1976. The government was in office from 28 October 1995 to 25 October 1999 and was formed by members of the Socialist Party (PS), the party with the most votes and elected members for the Assembly of the Republic following the 1995 legislative election. António Guterres, leader of the PS, served as Prime Minister.

== Party breakdown ==
Party breakdown of cabinet ministers by the end of the government's time in office: (Prime Minister not included)

- Socialist Party
- Independents
11
4

== Composition ==
The government was initially composed of the Prime Minister and 18 ministries comprising ministers, secretaries and under-secretaries of state. At the end of term, after some reorganizations, the number of ministries was 17.

The government included the Ministers of the Republic for the Autonomous Regions of Azores and Madeira until 5 October 1997, after which the fourth revision of the Constitution came into effect and these positions were removed from the Council of Ministers.

Ministers of the XIII Constitutional Government of Portugal
Office	Minister	Party	Start of term	End of term
Prime Minister	António Guterres	PS	28 October 1995	25 October 1999
Minister of Presidency	António Vitorino	PS	28 October 1995	25 November 1997
Assistant Minister to the Prime Minister (Ministro-Adjunto do Primeiro-Ministro)	José Sócrates	PS	25 November 1997	25 October 1999
Minister of Parliamentary Affairs	António Costa	PS	27 November 1997	25 October 1999
Minister of National Defense	António Vitorino	PS	28 October 1995	25 November 1997
Minister of National Defense	José da Veiga Simão	PS	25 November 1997	29 May 1999
Minister of National Defense	Jaime Gama	PS	29 May 1999	25 October 1999
Minister of Foreign Affairs	Jaime Gama	PS	28 October 1995	25 October 1999
Minister of Finance	António Sousa Franco	Independent	28 October 1995	25 October 1999
Minister of Internal Administration	Alberto Costa	PS	28 October 1995	25 November 1997
Minister of Internal Administration	Jorge Coelho	PS	25 November 1997	25 October 1999
Minister of Territorial Planning and Administration	João Cravinho	PS	28 October 1995	15 January 1996
Minister of Justice	José Vera Jardim	PS	28 October 1995	25 October 1999
Minister of Economy	Daniel Bessa	Independent	28 October 1995	27 March 1996
Minister of Economy	Augusto Mateus	Independent	27 March 1996	25 November 1997
Minister of Economy	Joaquim Pina Moura	PS	25 November 1997	25 October 1999
Minister of Social Infrastructure	Henrique Constantino	PS	28 October 1995	27 December 1997
Minister of Social Infrastructure	Francisco Murteira Nabo	PS	27 December 1997	15 January 1996
Minister of Territorial Infrastructure, Planning and Administration	João Cravinho	PS	15 January 1996	25 October 1999
Minister of Agriculture, Rural Development and Fisheries	Fernando Gomes da Silva	Independent	28 October 1995	3 October 1998
Minister of Agriculture, Rural Development and Fisheries	Luís Capoulas Santos	PS	3 October 1998	25 October 1999
Minister of Education	Eduardo Marçal Grilo	Independent	28 October 1995	25 October 1999
Minister of Health	Maria de Belém Roseira	PS	28 October 1995	25 October 1999
Minister for Qualification and Employment	Maria João Rodrigues	PS	28 October 1995	25 November 1997
Minister of Solidarity and Social Security	Eduardo Ferro Rodrigues	PS	28 October 1995	25 November 1997
Minister of Labour and Solidarity	Eduardo Ferro Rodrigues	PS	25 November 1997	25 October 1999
Minister of the Environment	Elisa Ferreira	Independent	28 October 1995	25 October 1999
Minister of Culture	Manuel Maria Carrilho	PS	28 October 1995	25 October 1999
Minister of Science and Technology	Mariano Gago	Independent	28 October 1995	25 October 1999
Deputy Minister	Jorge Coelho	PS	28 October 1995	25 November 1997
Minister of the Republic for the Autonomous Region of Azores	Mário Pinto	PSD	28 October 1995	5 October 1997
Minister of the Republic for the Autonomous Region of Madeira	Artur Rodrigues Consolado	Independent	28 October 1995	5 October 1997
