= Jorge Coelho (politician) =

Portuguese politician (1954–2021)

Jorge Coelho GCIH

Member of Council of State
- In office 2005–2009
- President: Jorge Sampaio; Aníbal Cavaco Silva
- Succeeded by: José Gomes Canotilho

Minister of State
- In office 14 April 2000 – 10 March 2001
- Prime Minister: António Guterres
- Preceded by: Jaime Gama
- Succeeded by: Manuela Ferreira Leite

Minister of the Social Infrastructure
- In office 25 October 1999 – 10 March 2001
- Prime Minister: António Guterres
- Preceded by: João Cravinho
- Succeeded by: Eduardo Ferro Rodrigues

Minister of the Presidency
- In office 25 October 1999 – 14 September 2000
- Prime Minister: António Guterres
- Preceded by: Office re-created
- Succeeded by: Guilherme d'Oliveira Martins

Minister of Internal Administration
- In office 25 November 1997 – 25 October 1999
- Prime Minister: António Guterres
- Preceded by: Alberto Costa
- Succeeded by: Fernando Gomes

Minister in the Cabinet of the Prime Minister
- In office 28 October 1995 – 25 November 1997
- Preceded by: Luís Marques Mendes
- Succeeded by: José Sócrates

Member of the Assembly of the Republic
- In office 13 August 1987 – 3 November 1991
- Constituency: Lisbon
- In office 4 November 1991 – 26 October 1995
- Constituency: Setúbal
- In office 27 October 1995 – 24 October 1999
- Constituency: Lisbon
- In office 25 October 1999 – 4 April 2002
- Constituency: Setúbal
- In office 5 April 2002 – 9 March 2005
- Constituency: Lisbon
- In office 10 March 2005 – November 2006
- Constituency: Lisbon

Personal details
- Born: Jorge Paulo Sacadura Almeida Coelho; 17 July 1954 Viseu, Portugal
- Died: 7 April 2021 (aged 66) Figueira da Foz, Portugal
- Party: Popular Democratic Union (from 1974); Socialist Party (since 1982)
- Spouse: Fortunata Cecília Fernandes da Silva Seixas (m. 1975)
- Parents: Jorge Francisco Almeida Coelho (father); Rosa Sacadura de Almeida (mother)

Jorge Coelho GCIH (17 July 1954 – 7 April 2021) was a Portuguese politician.

== Early life and education ==
He was born at 9.30pm in the maternity ward of Viseu Hospital, to Jorge Francisco Almeida Coelho, 30 and his wife Rosa Sacadura de Almeida, 26, both from Mangualde and who live in Contenças, Mangualde. Paternal grandson of Raul de Abrantes Coelho and his wife Isaura de Almeida and maternal grandson of José Domingos de Almeida and his wife Maria Elisa Sacadura.

Raised in Contenças, in the municipality of Mangualde, he studied at the Colégio de Santa Maria e São José in that town. His paternal grandfather, Raul de Abrantes Coelho, a supporter of the Estado Novo, was even on the National Union list.

An engineering student at the Faculty of Science and Technology of the University of Coimbra, he was a member of the extreme left before and after the Carnation Revolution. After the Revolution he was one of the founding members of the Popular Democratic Union. He then became active in the Socialist Party, led by Mário Soares.

He was civilly married at the 10th Civil Registry Office in Lisbon on 22 August 1975 to Fortunata Cecília Fernandes da Silva Seixas.

He was a member of the Electoral Process Support Secretariat (STAPE, Secretariado de Apoio ao Processo Eleitoral), which he combined with his academic studies in Lisbon, studying for a degree in Business Organisation and Management at the Higher Institute of Economic and Financial Sciences of the Technical University of Lisbon.

== Political career ==
He joined the Socialist Party in 1982.

That same year, he was appointed chief of staff to the Secretary of State for Transport in the 9th Constitutional Government of Portugal, Francisco Murteira Nabo (1983–1985).

His next executive experience was in Macau, where he was head of the office of the Macao Deputy Secretary of State for Social Affairs, Education and Youth (1988–1989) and, now in government in the same region, as Deputy Secretary for Education and Public Administration (1989–1991).

After returning to Portugal, he was the Socialist "machine man". Very close to António Guterres, he played an active role in Guterres' election as secretary-general of the Socialist Party, in elections won over Jorge Sampaio. He then managed the entire structure that mounted the Socialist Party's successful electoral campaign in the legislative elections of 1995.

In the first government led by António Guterres, the 13th Constitutional Government of Portugal, which took office on 28 October 1995, he became deputy minister.

In the reshuffle of 25 November 1997, he became Minister of Internal Administration. One of the initiatives he took as deputy minister was the creation of the Citizen's Shop. Together with his Secretary of State for Public Administration, Fausto Correia, he launched the concept of the Citizen's Shop in Portugal, a service centre for various public entities, bringing together and connecting services in a single space.

In the legislative elections that followed, on 10 October 1999, the Socialist Party (PS) won again (with António Guterres as leader of the PS and Durão Barroso as leader of the PSD) with the unusual situation of reaching 115 deputies, exactly half the number of deputies in the Assembly of the Republic, just one off from an absolute majority. Also in these elections, Jorge Coelho took on the role of leading the organisation of the electoral campaign.

In the 14th Constitutional Government of Portugal, after the 1999 legislative elections, he took up the posts of Minister of the Presidency and Minister of Social Infrastructure (Public Works).

In the reshuffle of 14 September 2000, he retained the post of Minister of Social Infrastructure and left the post of Minister of the Presidency to become Minister of State.

Following the collapse of the Hintze Ribeiro Bridge in Entre-os-Rios, Castelo de Paiva, on 4 March 2001, in which 59 people died, he resigned from the government, "taking political responsibility" for the accident and that "it wouldn't sit well with my conscience if I didn't". His last decision in office was to call for an enquiry because "guilt cannot die alone".

On 10 March 2001, he was replaced by Eduardo Ferro Rodrigues as Minister of Social Infrastructure. After leaving the government, he continued to play a central role in the PS and also coordinated the electoral campaign for the legislative elections on 20 February 2005, in which the PS won its first absolute majority, and also for the local elections in October 2005.

In November 2006, he resigned as a member of parliament and gave up all party posts to devote himself to his professional activity.

== Post-political career ==
He was a director of CONGETMARK, a guest lecturer in Public and Political Communication at the Instituto Superior de Comunicação Empresarial (ISCEM) and a consultant. During this period, he held only one public office, that of Counsellor of State, elected by the Assembly of the Republic in 2005. On 15 June 2009, following a request made in 2008, he was replaced on the Council of State by José Gomes Canotilho.

He resigned as a member of the Council of State in 2008 when he was invited to become CEO of the Mota-Engil Group. Previously, he carried out the group's strategic plan between 2009 and 2013 for the Group, called "Ambição 2013" (Ambition 2013).

In 2016, he founded Queijaria Vale da Estrela, located in Mangualde, very close to Contenças, where he grew up. The company produces Serra da Estrela cheese and, according to the press, has formalised agreements with the SONAE, Jerónimo Martins and El Corte Inglés groups, once the Protected Designation of Origin certification process has been completed.

When he took up this post, he also stopped being a commentator on the Quadratura do Círculo programme on SIC Notícias. Later, in March 2013, he returned to being a commentator on the same programme on the same channel. When the programme changed its name to Circulatura do Quadrado and its channel to TVI24 in February 2019, he remained a commentator until July 2020, having been replaced by Ana Catarina Mendes from September 2020.

Before joining António Guterres' government in 1995, according to the tax return submitted to the Constitutional Court, he had a gross income of €41,233 and in 2009, three years after resigning from all political and party positions, he had an annual income of €702,758.

According to the Expresso newspaper, he was a member of the Freemasons, particularly the Lusitanian Grand Orient, from which he had withdrawn in the last years of his life.

== Death ==
He died on 7 April 2021, following sudden cardiac arrest while visiting a house in the tourist area of Figueira da Foz.

== Honours ==
=== National honours ===
- Grand Cross of the Order of Prince Henry (13 May 2021, posthumously)

=== Foreign honours ===
- Brazil: Grand Cross of the Order of Rio Branco (21 May 1999)
- Spain: Grand Cross of the Order of Civil Merit (26 September 2000)
