= António Serrano =

Portuguese politician (born 1965)

- In office 26 October 2009 – 21 June 2011
- Minister: Minister of Agriculture, Rural Development and Fisheries
- Preceded by: Jaime Silva
- Succeeded by: Ministry extinct (succeeded by Assunção Cristas as Minister of Agriculture, the Sea, the Environment, and Spatial Planning)

Personal details
- Born: 16 January 1965 (age 61) Beja, Portugal
- Party: PS
- Education: University of Évora
- Occupation: Politician and professor

António Manuel Soares Serrano (born 16 January 1965) is a Portuguese professor and politician who was Minister of Agriculture, Rural Development and Fisheries in the 18th Constitutional Government of Portugal.

== Biography ==
António Manuel Soares Serrano was born in Beja on 16 January 1965.

Serrano is a professor at the University of Évora and holds a doctorate in Business Management. He is chairman of the Board of Directors of the Espírito Santo Hospital in Évora. He was director of the Agri-Food Policy Planning Office of the Ministry of Agriculture, and a member of the Steering Committee of the Alentejo Operational Programme - INALENTEJO, of the Quadro de Referência Estratégico Nacional (QREN).

Serrano was appointed Minister of Agriculture, Rural Development and Fisheries in the XVIII Constitutional Government of Portugal in October 2009.

During his term Serrano actively campaigned for wildfire preventive measures.

== See also ==
- XVIII Constitutional Government of Portugal
