= Assunção Cristas =

Portuguese lawyer, professor and politician

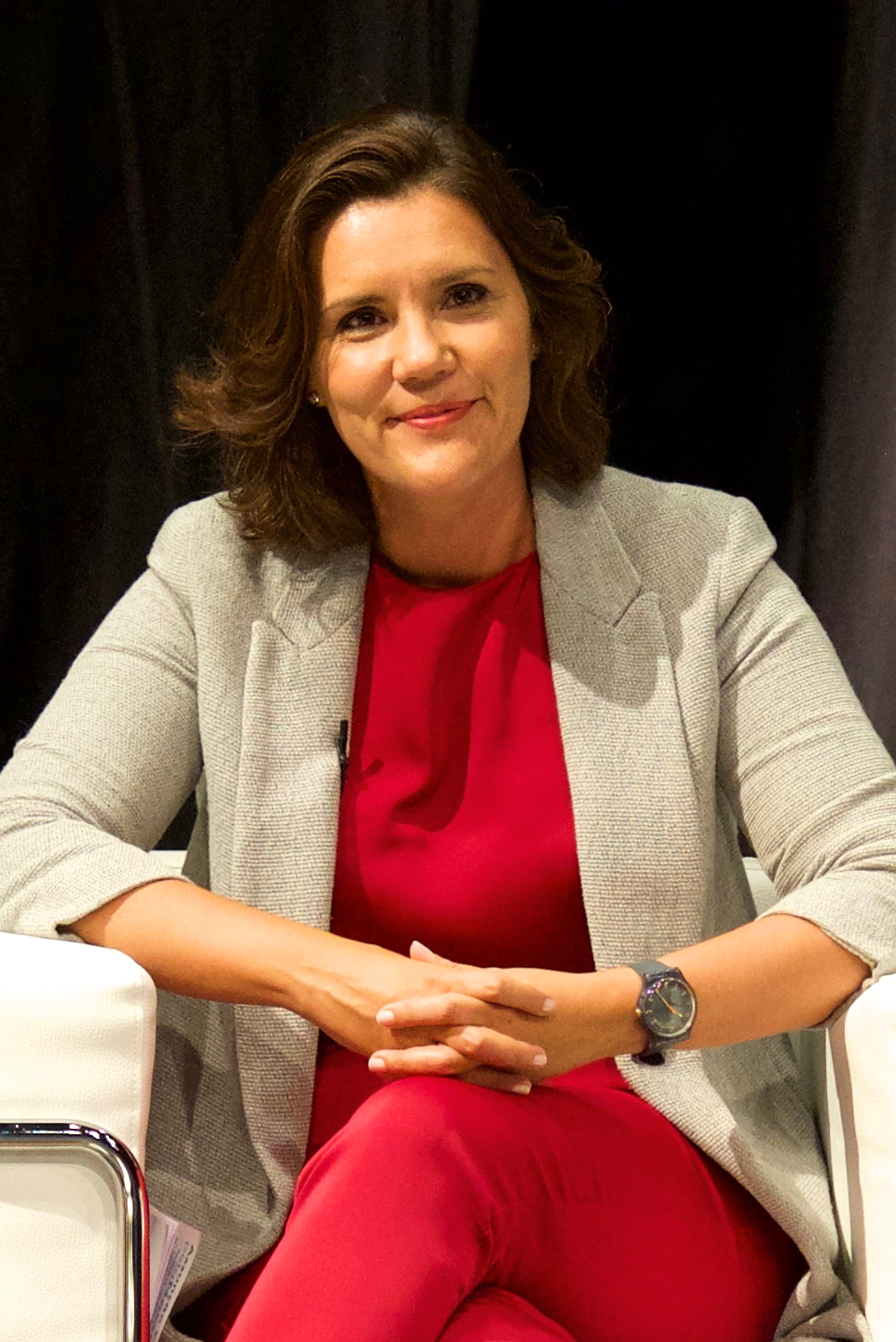
- Assunção Cristas in 2017

President of the CDS – People's Party
- In office 13 March 2016 – 26 January 2020
- Preceded by: Paulo Portas
- Succeeded by: Francisco Rodrigues dos Santos

Minister of Agriculture and Sea
- In office 21 June 2011 – 26 November 2015
- Prime Minister: Pedro Passos Coelho
- Preceded by: António Serrano
- Succeeded by: Luís Capoulas Santos

Minister of the Environment and Territorial Planning
- In office 21 June 2011 – 24 July 2013
- Prime Minister: Pedro Passos Coelho
- Preceded by: Dulce Pássaro
- Succeeded by: Jorge Moreira da Silva

Member of the Assembly of the Republic
- In office 15 October 2009 – 27 January 2020
- Constituency: Leiria (2009–2019); Lisbon (2019–2020)

Member of the Lisbon City Council
- In office 1 October 2017 – 17 October 2021

Personal details
- Born: Maria de Assunção de Oliveira Cristas; 28 September 1974 (age 52) Luanda, Portuguese Angola
- Party: CDS – People's Party (2007–present)
- Spouse: Tiago Machado da Graça (m. 1998)
- Children: 4
- Education: University of Lisbon
- Occupation: Lawyer • Professor • Politician

Maria de Assunção de Oliveira Cristas Machado da Graça (born 28 September 1974) is a Portuguese lawyer, professor and politician. She was the President of the CDS – People's Party from 2016 to 2020.

Since 2017 she's also opposition leader councilwoman in the Lisbon City Council, elected with 21% of the popular vote.

From 2011 to 2015, she served as Minister of Agriculture, Sea, Environment and Territorial Planning in the government led by Pedro Passos Coelho.

== Life before politics ==
She is a lawyer by training and a professor at the New University of Lisbon. She graduated in law in 1997 by the University of Lisbon, was admitted in the Portuguese Bar Association in 1999 and completed her doctorate in Private Law in 2004.

== Political career ==
Assunção Cristas has been a member of Democratic and Social Centre - People's Party since 2007. She was first elected to the Assembly of the Republic in 2009 elections, representing Leiria. She was re-elected in 2011 elections, participating in the negotiations between her party and the winning Social Democratic Party to form a coalition government.

Cristas led the CDS-PP into the 2019 elections. Her party was defeated, with the CDS-PP losing 13 seats and retaining only 5. She announced her resignation as leader of CDS-PP that evening.

== Electoral history ==
=== CDS–PP leadership election, 2016 ===
Ballot: 13 March 2016
Candidate	Votes	%
Assunção Cristas	877	98.8
Miguel Mattos Chaves	11	1.2
Turnout	888	
Source: Results

=== Lisbon City Council election, 2017 ===
Ballot: 1 October 2017
Party	Candidate	Votes	%	Seats	+/−
PS	Fernando Medina	106,036	42.0	8	–3
CDS–PP/MPT/PPM	Assunção Cristas	51,984	20.6	4	+3
PSD	Teresa Leal Coelho	28,336	11.2	2	–1
CDU	João Ferreira	24,110	9.6	2	±0
BE	Ricardo Robles	18,025	7.1	1	+1
PAN	Inês Sousa Real	7,658	3.0	0	±0
Other parties		5,833	2.3	0	±0
Blank/Invalid ballots		10,498	4.2	–	–
Turnout		252,481	51.16	17	±0
Source: Autárquicas 2017

=== Legislative election, 2019 ===
Ballot: 6 October 2019
Party	Candidate	Votes	%	Seats	+/−
PS	António Costa	1,903,687	36.3	108	+22
PSD	Rui Rio	1,454,283	27.8	79	–10
BE	Catarina Martins	498,549	9.5	19	±0
CDU	Jerónimo de Sousa	332,018	6.3	12	–5
CDS–PP	Assunção Cristas	221,094	4.2	5	–13
PAN	André Silva	173,931	3.3	4	+3
Chega	André Ventura	67,502	1.3	1	new
IL	Carlos Guimarães Pinto	67,443	1.3	1	new
Livre	Joacine Katar Moreira	56,940	1.1	1	+1
Other parties		207,162	4.0	0	±0
Blank/Invalid ballots		254,875	4.9	–	–
Turnout		5,237,484	48.60	230	±0
Source: Comissão Nacional de Eleições

== See also ==
- Ministry of Agriculture, Sea, Environment and Spatial Planning
