= XVIII Constitutional Government of Portugal =

Cabinet of Portugal between 2009 and 2011, led by José Sócrates

- Cabinet of Portugal

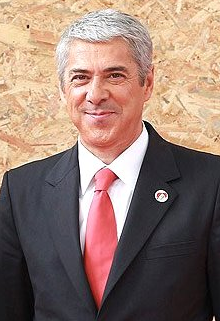
- Prime Minister José Socrates
- Date formed: 26 October 2009
- Date dissolved: 21 June 2011 (1 year, 7 months and 26 days)

People and organisations
- President of the Republic: Aníbal Cavaco Silva
- Prime Minister: José Sócrates
- No. of ministers: 16 ministers
- Member party: Socialist Party (PS)
- Status in legislature: Minority
- Opposition parties: Social Democratic Party (PSD); CDS – People's Party (CDS-PP); Left Bloc (BE); Portuguese Communist Party (PCP); Ecologist Party "The Greens" (PEV)

History
- Elections: 2009 Portuguese legislative election (27 September 2009)
- Predecessor: XVII Constitutional Government of Portugal
- Successor: XIX Constitutional Government of Portugal

The XVIII Constitutional Government of Portugal (Portuguese: XVIII Governo Constitucional de Portugal) was the 18th government of the Third Portuguese Republic, under the Portuguese Constitution of 1976. It was in office from 26 October 2009 to 21 June 2011, and was formed by the members of the Socialist Party (PS). José Sócrates, leader of the PS, served as Prime Minister.

== Party breakdown ==
Party breakdown of cabinet ministers by the end of the government's time in office: (Prime Minister not included)

- Socialist Party
- Independents
8
8

== Composition ==
The government was composed of the Prime Minister and 16 ministries comprising ministers, secretaries and under-secretaries of state.

Office	Minister	Party	Start of term	End of term
Prime Minister	José Sócrates	PS	26 October 2009	21 June 2011
Minister of State and Foreign Affairs	Luís Amado	PS	26 October 2009	21 June 2011
Minister of State and Finance	Fernando Teixeira dos Santos	Independent	26 October 2009	21 June 2011
Minister of Presidency	Pedro Silva Pereira	PS	26 October 2009	21 June 2011
Minister of National Defense	Augusto Santos Silva	PS	26 October 2009	21 June 2011
Minister of Internal Administration	Rui Pereira	Independent	26 October 2009	21 June 2011
Minister of Justice	Alberto Martins	PS	26 October 2009	21 June 2011
Minister of the Economy, Innovation and Development	José António Vieira da Silva	PS	26 October 2009	21 June 2011
Minister of Agriculture, Rural Development and Fisheries	António Serrano	Independent	26 October 2009	21 June 2011
Minister of Public Works, Transport and Communications	António Mendonça	Independent	26 October 2009	21 June 2011
Minister of the Environment and Spatial Planning	Dulce Pássaro	Independent	26 October 2009	21 June 2011
Minister of Labour and Social Solidarity	Helena André	PS	26 October 2009	21 June 2011
Minister of Health	Ana Jorge	Independent	26 October 2009	21 June 2011
Minister of Education	Isabel Alçada	Independent	26 October 2009	21 June 2011
Minister of Science, Technology and Higher Education	Mariano Gago	Independent	26 October 2009	21 June 2011
Minister of Culture	Gabriela Canavilhas	PS	26 October 2009	21 June 2011
Minister of Parliamentary Affairs	Jorge Lacão	PS	26 October 2009	21 June 2011

== Events ==
In 2008–09, with the Great Recession starting to hit Portugal and facing recession and high unemployment, austerity was waned as part of the European economic stimulus plan. Nevertheless, support for Sócrates and the Socialists eroded and the ruling party lost its majority in the 2009 election. The second government of José Sócrates faced a deterioration of the economic and financial state of the country, with skyrocketing deficit and growing debt. Austerity was resumed in 2010 while the country entered a hard financial crisis in the context of the European debt crisis.

On 23 March 2011, Sócrates submitted his resignation to President Aníbal Cavaco Silva after the Parliament rejected a new austerity package (the fourth in a year), leading to the 2011 snap election. Financial status of the country deteriorated and on 6 April Sócrates caretaker government requested a bail-out program which was conceded. The €78 billion IMF/European Union bailout to Portugal thus started and would last until May 2014. Sócrates lost the snap election held on 5 June 2011 and resigned as Secretary-General of the Socialist Party. For most of his political career, Sócrates was associated to several corruption cases, notably Independente University and Freeport cases.
