= Ministry of Social Infrastructure (Portugal) =

Government ministry of Portugal

- Ministério do Equipamento Social

Ministry overview
- Formed: 9 June 1983
- Preceding Ministry: Ministry of Housing, Public Works and Transport
- Dissolved: 6 April 2002
- Superseding Ministry: Ministry of Public Works, Transport Transport and Housing
- Jurisdiction: Government of Portugal
- Status: Abolished
- Headquarters: Lisbon

The Ministry of Social Infrastructure was the name of a government department of the 9th, 13th and 14th Constitutional Governments of Portugal.

== List of position holders ==
The holders of the post of Minister of Social Infrastructure were:

Period	Minister	Government
9 June 1983	Ministry created from Ministry of Housing, Public Works and Transport	IX Constitutional Government
9 June 1983 – 15 February 1985	João Rosado Correia	IX Constitutional Government
15 February 1985 – 6 November 1985	Carlos Melancia	IX Constitutional Government
6 November 1985 – 28 October 1995	Ministry of Social Equipment became Ministry of Public Works, Transport and Communications	X, XI, XII Constitutional Government
28 October 1995 – 27 December 1995	Henrique Constantino	XIII Constitutional Government
27 December 1995 – 15 January 1996	Francisco Murteira Nabo	XIII Constitutional Government
15 January 1996 – 25 October 1999	Ministry of Social Infrastructure became Ministry of Infrastructure, Planning and Territorial Administration	XIII Constitutional Government
25 October 1999 – 10 March 2001	Jorge Coelho	XIV Constitutional Government
10 March 2001 – 23 January 2002	Eduardo Ferro Rodrigues	XIV Constitutional Government
23 January 2002 – 6 April 2002	José Sócrates (por delegação de funções)	XIV Constitutional Government
6 April 2002	Ministry abolished	XV Constitutional Government
