= Ministry of Agriculture, Rural Development and Fisheries =

Extinct Portuguese government agency

- Ministério da Agricultura, do Desenvolvimento Rural e das Pescas

Agency overview
- Formed: 28 October 1995
- Preceding agencies: Ministry of Agriculture (1991-1995); Ministry of Agriculture, Fisheries and Forestry (2004-2005)
- Dissolved: 2004, 2011
- Superseding agencies: Ministry of Agriculture, Fisheries and Forestry; Ministry of Agriculture, the Sea, the Environment, and Spatial Planning (2011-)
- Type: Ministry
- Jurisdiction: Government of Portugal
- Minister responsible: Minister of Agriculture, Rural Development and Fisheries
- Agency executive: Extinct

The Ministry of Agriculture, Rural Development and Fisheries was the name of a department of the XIII, XIV, XV, XVII and XVIII Constitutional Governments of Portugal.

== Ministers ==
The heads of this ministry were:

Time Period	Minister	Government
1995 – 1998	Fernando Gomes da Silva	XIII Constitutional Government
1998 – 1999	Luís Capoulas Santos	XIII Constitutional Government
1999 – 2002	Luís Capoulas Santos	XIV Constitutional Government
2002 – 2004	Armando Sevinate Pinto	XV Constitutional Government
2004-2005	Extinct	XVI Constitutional Government of Portugal
2005 – 2009	(De-extinct) Jaime Silva	XVII Constitutional Government
2009 – 2011	António Serrano	XVIII Constitutional Government
2011 –	Extinct	
