= Aqui há talento =

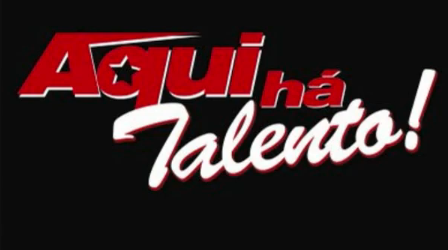
- Logo of Aqui há talento
- Genre: Reality show, talent show, entertainment
- Presented by: Sílvia Alberto
- Judges: Paulo Dias; Silvia Rizzo; Joaquim Monchique
- Country of origin: Portugal

Production
- Producer: Sérgio Graciano
- Running time: 90 minutes

Original release
- Network: RTP1
- Release: January 28, 2007 – May 2007

Related
- Got Talent; Portugal Tem Talento

Aqui há talento is the first Portuguese version of the Got Talent series. It was launched on RTP1 on February 1, 2007. Singers, dancers, comedians, variety acts, and other performers competed against each other for a €10,000 money prize.

It was hosted by Sílvia Alberto and the judges were Paulo Dias, Sílvia Rizzo and Joaquim Monchique.
