= Nuno Crato =

Portuguese mathematician and economist (born 1952)

Nuno Crato GCIH, GCPI
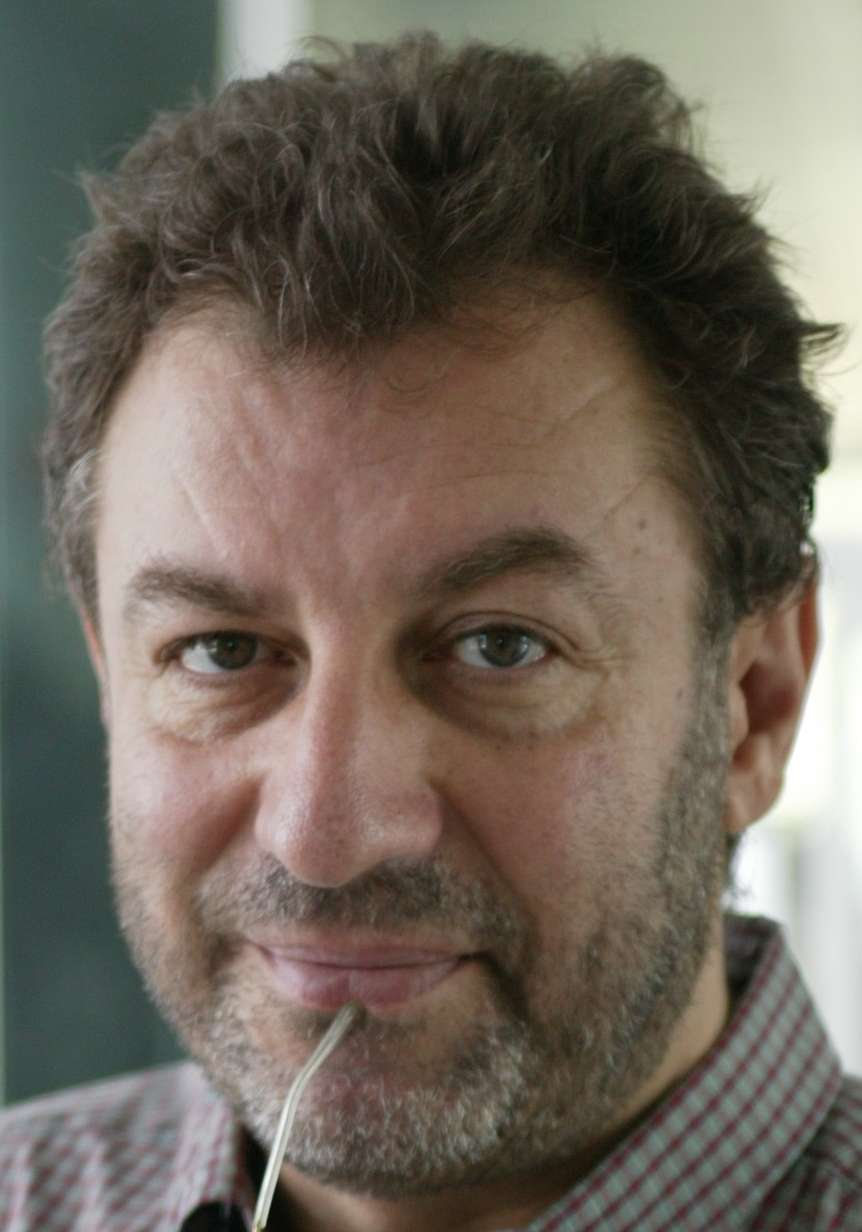

Minister of Education and Science
- In office 21 June 2011 – 30 October 2015
- President: Aníbal Cavaco Silva
- Prime Minister: Pedro Passos Coelho
- Preceded by: Isabel Alçada (Education); Mariano Gago (Higher Education and Science)
- Succeeded by: Margarida Mano

Personal details
- Born: 9 March 1952 (age 74) Lisbon, Portugal
- Party: Independent
- Children: 2
- Education: Technical University of Lisbon; University of Delaware
- Occupation: University professor • Mathematician
- Website: http://nunocrato.org

Nuno Paulo de Sousa Arrobas Crato, GCIH, GCPI (born 9 March 1952) is a Portuguese university professor, researcher, applied mathematician, economist, and writer. For many years, Crato was a researcher and professor in the United States. Back in Portugal, he taught mathematics and statistics at the ISEG/Technical University of Lisbon, now University of Lisbon, while pursuing his research in stochastic models and time series. He also published many articles and participated in events of science popularization and for the history of science. In June 2011, he was appointed Minister of Education, Higher Education and Science, in the cabinet of the Portuguese Government led by Pedro Passos Coelho, serving through the end of Coelho's government in 2015. He was three times awarded a national medal from the President of the Republic, as commander (2008) and with the grand cross (2016) of the Order of Prince Henry the Navigator, which is the highest grade given to a national figure. Lastly, as grand cross of Order of Public Instruction (Portugal) (2022), which is the highest grade of this order. He has lived and worked in Lisbon, Azores, the United States and Italy.

== Early years ==
Nuno Crato was born in Lisbon on 9 March 1952. Crato studied for a while at the Faculdade de Ciências/University of Lisbon before changing his mind and graduating in economics at the Instituto Superior de Economia e Gestão/Technical University of Lisbon (ISEG/UTL). In addition, he received a master's degree in mathematical methods from ISEG/UTL. He completed his doctorate in applied mathematics at the University of Delaware.

== Academic career ==
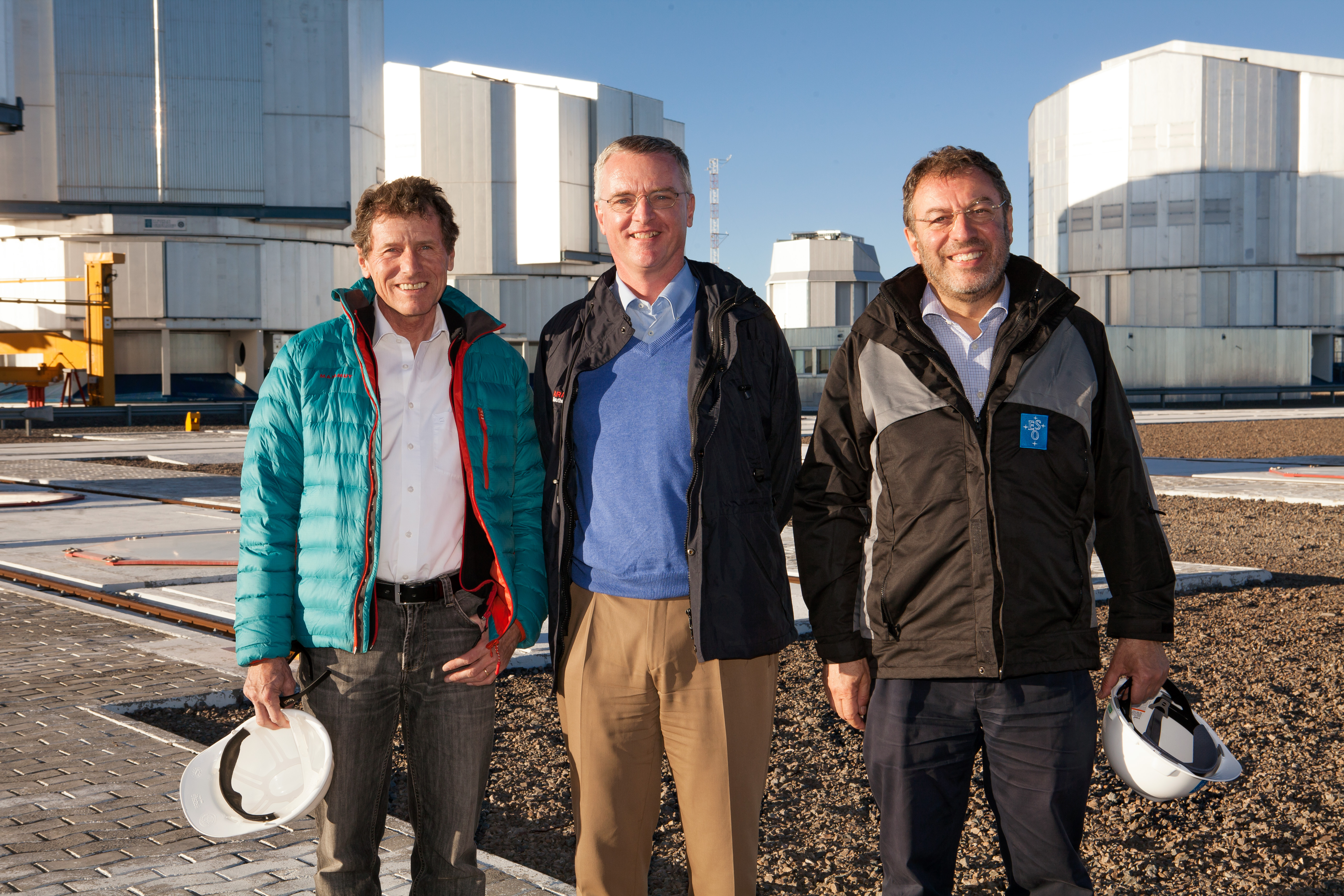
Austrian and Portuguese Ministers for Science visit the European Southern Observatory

Crato taught at the University of the Azores, Stevens Institute of Technology and the New Jersey Institute of Technology. Since 2000 Crato has been professor of mathematics and statistics at ISEG. He was also appointed pro-Rector of the Technical University of Lisbon.

He has several general works published in the fields of science popularization and history of science, and myriad academic works and papers in mathematics-related subfields. He has been elected three times president of the Portuguese Mathematical Society (2004-2010) and appointed president of the Taguspark science park in Oeiras Municipality, Lisbon Region. He has been a regular presence in several television programs including 4 vezes ciência for RTP and Mário Crespo's Plano Inclinado for SIC Notícias.

Crato has won some scientific prizes, namely the European Mathematical Society Public Awareness of Mathematics prize in 2003, and a European Science Award in 2008.

Currently a full professor of mathematics and statistics at the Lisbon School of Economics and Management, Crato has published on the fields of time series analysis and probabilistic models, with applications in econometrics, computer algorithms, human behavior, and other topics.

== Political career ==
In June 2011, he was appointed Minister of Education, Higher Education and Science, in the cabinet of the Portuguese Government led by Pedro Passos Coelho. During his tenure, mandatory schooling was increased from 9th to 12th grade, dropout rates were substantially reduced (from 23-27% to 13.7%), English was introduced as a mandatory subject, retention decreased to historical low levels, and academic results improved. International evaluations TIMSS and PISA showed a significant improvement: from 2011/2012 to 2015, Portuguese students results raised to above OECD and IEA averages, attaining the best results ever for Portugal.

A few analysts explain these advances by some of the educational measures put in place during his tenure: the development of more demanding curricula, the external evaluation of students, teachers and schools, and the creation of vocational paths. He also stressed the need for improvement of teacher's initial training.

He has no party affiliation.

After his tenure in government he returned to the University of Lisbon.

== Publications ==
In addition to his scientific research contributions , he has published extensively in the fields of science popularization and education. Some of his books have been published in a few languages and countries, such as Portugal, Brazil, the U.S., the U.K., and Italy. His recent books include:

Developing Curriculum for Deep Thinking - The Knowledge Revival, T. Surma, et al., Springer 2025

O Manual Escolar, N. Crato, Almedina 2025

Aprender, N. Crato, FFMS 2025

Improving National Education Systems After COVID-19, N. Crato, H. A. Patrinos (ed.), Springer, 2025

Apología del Libro de Texto, N. Crato, Madrid, Narcea 2024

Improving a Country's Education: Pisa 2018 Results in 10 Countries, N. Crato, (ed.), Springer 2021

Data-Driven Policy Impact Evaluation: How Access to Microdata is Transforming Policy Design, N. Crato and P. Paruolo (eds.) Springer 2019

Einstein's Eclipse, N. Crato and L. Tirapicos, CTT 2019

Raising Public Awareness of Mathematics, E. Behrends, N. Crato, and J.F. Rodrigues (Eds.), Springer 2012

Figuring It Out: Entertaining Encounters with Everyday Math, N. Crato, Springer 2010
