= 9th Constitutional Government of Portugal =

Cabinet of Portugal between 1983 and 1985, led by Mário Soares

IX Constitutional Government of Portugal
- Cabinet of Portugal

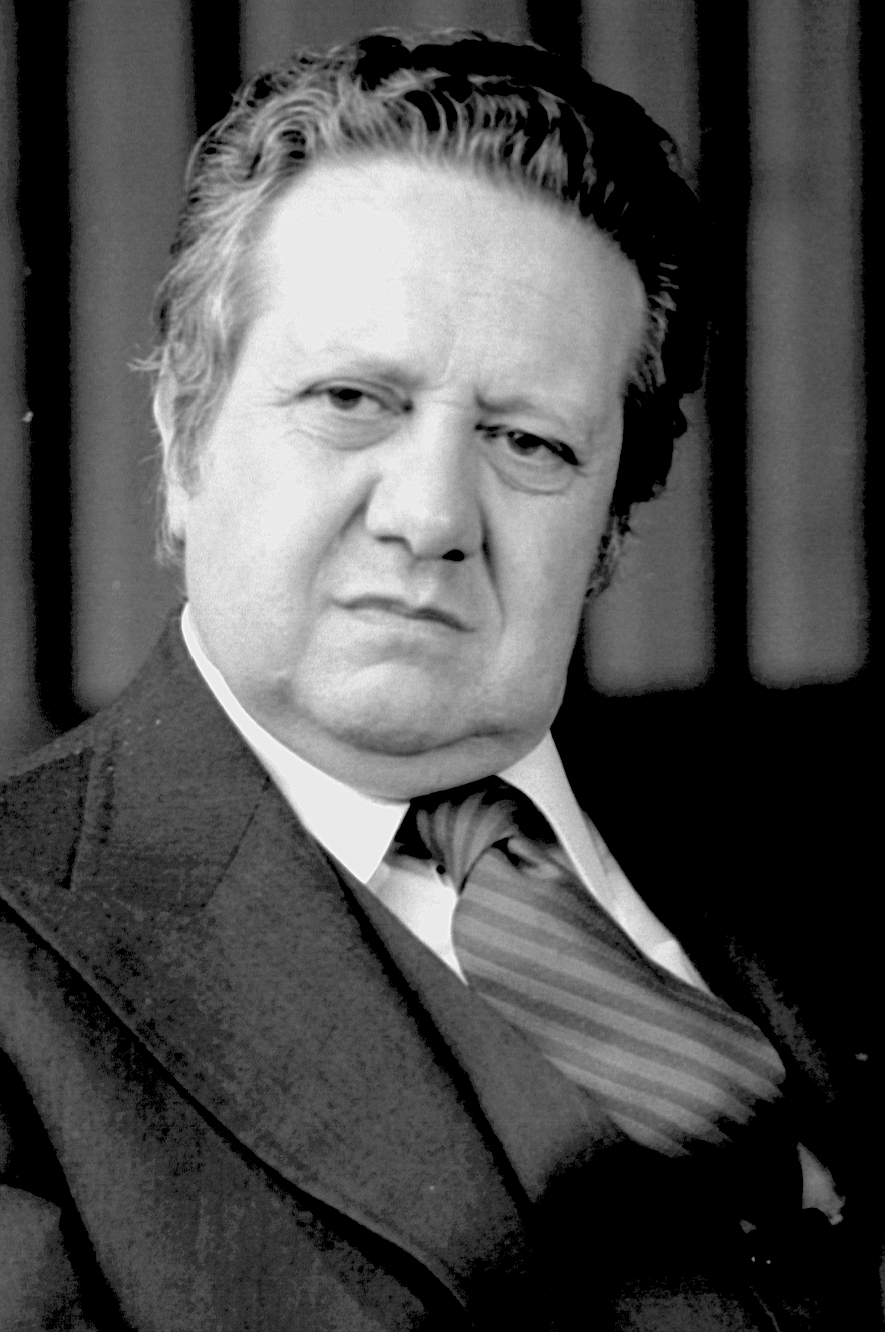
- Prime Minister Mário Soares
- Date formed: 9 June 1983
- Date dissolved: 6 November 1985

People and organisations
- President of the Republic: António Ramalho Eanes
- Prime Minister: Mário Soares
- Vice Prime Minister: Carlos Mota Pinto (1983–1985); Rui Machete (1985)
- Member parties: Socialist Party (PS); Social Democratic Party (PSD)
- Status in legislature: Majority coalition government
- Opposition parties: Portuguese Communist Party (PCP); Democratic and Social Center (CDS); Portuguese Democratic Movement (MDP/CDE)

History
- Election: 1983 Portuguese legislative election (25 April 1983)
- Predecessor: VIII Constitutional Government of Portugal
- Successor: X Constitutional Government of Portugal

The IX Constitutional Government of Portugal (Portuguese: IX Governo Constitucional de Portugal) was the ninth government of the Third Portuguese Republic, in office from 9 June 1983 to 6 November 1985. It was formed by a coalition between the Socialist Party (PS) and the Social Democratic Party (PSD), which became known as the Central Bloc (Bloco Central) due to both parties centrist political positioning. It was the third term of Mário Soares, leader of the PS, as Prime Minister.

== Party breakdown ==
Party breakdown of cabinet ministers by the end of the government's time in office: (Prime Minister not included)

- Socialist Party
8
- Social Democratic Party
8
- Independents
3

== Composition ==
The government was composed of the Prime Minister, one Deputy Prime Minister, and 17 ministries comprising ministers, secretaries and sub-secretaries of state. The government also included the Ministers of the Republic for the Autonomous Regions of Azores and Madeira.

Ministers of the IX Constitutional Government of Portugal
Office	Minister	Party	Start of term	End of term
Prime Minister	Mário Soares	PS	9 June 1983	6 November 1985
Deputy Prime Minister (also Minister of National Defence)	Carlos Mota Pinto	PSD	9 June 1983	15 February 1985
Deputy Prime Minister (also Minister of National Defence)	Rui Machete	PSD	15 February 1985	6 November 1985
Minister of State	António de Almeida Santos	PS	9 June 1983	6 November 1985
Minister of Internal Administration	Eduardo Pereira	PS	9 June 1983	6 November 1985
Minister of Foreign Affairs	Jaime Gama	PS	9 June 1983	6 November 1985
Minister of Justice	Rui Machete	PSD	9 June 1983	15 February 1985
Minister of Justice	Mário Raposo	PSD	15 February 1985	6 November 1985
Minister of Finance and Planning	Ernâni Lopes	Independent	9 June 1983	6 November 1985
Minister of Education	José Augusto Seabra	PSD	9 June 1983	15 February 1985
Minister of Education	João de Deus Pinheiro	PSD	15 February 1985	6 November 1985
Minister of Labour and Social Security	Amândio de Azevedo	PSD	9 June 1983	6 November 1985
Minister of Health	António Maldonado Gonelha	PS	9 June 1983	6 November 1985
Minister of Agriculture, Forests and Food	Manuel Soares Costa	PSD	9 June 1983	17 October 1984
Minister of Agriculture	Álvaro Barreto	PSD	17 October 1984	6 November 1985
Minister of Industry and Energy	José Veiga Simão	PS	9 June 1983	6 November 1985
Minister of Commerce and Tourism	Álvaro Barreto	PSD	9 June 1983	17 October 1984
Minister of Commerce and Tourism	Joaquim Ferreira do Amaral	PSD	17 October 1984	6 November 1985
Minister of Culture	António Coimbra Martins	PS	9 June 1983	6 November 1985
Minister of Social Infrastructure	João Rosado Correia	PS	9 June 1983	15 February 1985
Minister of Social Infrastructure	Carlos Melancia	PS	15 February 1985	6 November 1985
Minister of Sea	Carlos Melancia	PS	9 June 1983	15 February 1985
Minister of Sea	José de Almeida Serra	PS	15 February 1985	6 November 1985
Minister of Quality of Life	António Capucho	PSD	9 June 1983	23 June 1984
Minister of Quality of Life	Francisco Sousa Tavares	PSD	23 June 1984	11 July 1985
Minister of the Republic for the Autonomous Region of Azores	Tomás Conceição Silva	Independent	9 June 1983	11 July 1985
Minister of the Republic for the Autonomous Region of Madeira	Lino Miguel	Independent	9 June 1983	11 July 1985
