= Mariano Gago =

Portuguese physicist and politician (1948–2015)

Mariano Gago ComSE
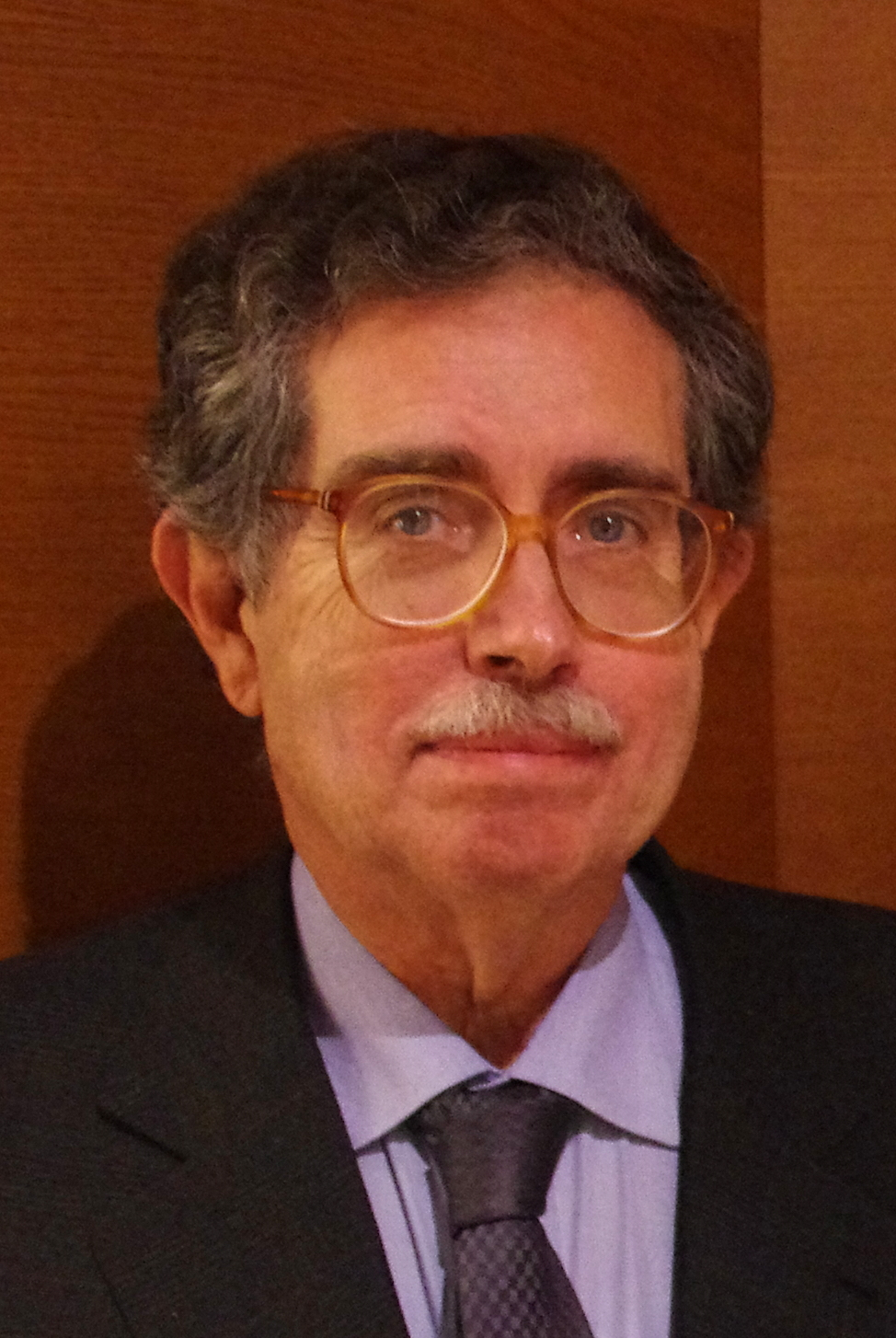
- Gago in 2014

Minister of Science, Technology and Higher Education
- In office 12 March 2005 – 21 June 2011
- Prime Minister: José Sócrates
- Preceded by: Maria da Graça Carvalho (as Minister of Science and Higher Education)
- Succeeded by: Nuno Crato (as Minister of Education and Science)

Minister of Science and Technology
- In office 28 October 1995 – 6 April 2002
- Prime Minister: António Guterres
- Preceded by: Manuela Ferreira Leite (as Minister of Education)
- Succeeded by: Pedro Lynce (as Minister of Science and Higher Education)

Personal details
- Born: 16 May 1948 Lisbon, Portugal
- Died: 17 April 2015 (aged 66) Lisbon, Portugal
- Spouse: Karin Wall
- Children: 1
- Profession: Particle physicist Professor

José Mariano Rebelo Pires Gago ComSE (16 May 1948 – 17 April 2015) was a Portuguese physicist, professor and politician, mostly known for his tenures as Minister for Science and Higher Education. He held government offices for a total of 13 years, more than any other person since 1976.

He graduated as an electrical engineer by the University of Lisbon's Instituto Superior Técnico in Lisbon, and did advanced research work in Paris at the École Polytechnique as a high-energy physicist. Professor of Physics at Instituto Superior Técnico in Lisbon, he worked at CERN (European Organization for Nuclear Research) in Geneva for several years. He was a member of the CERN Council (1985–1990), the EC Joint Research Centre Board of Governors (1986–1989), President of the Portuguese National Board for Science and Technology (1986–1989), and was chair of the European EUREKA initiative from July 1997 to June 1998. Prof. Gago was the Minister for Science and Technology of Portugal since 1995, and represented Portugal at the Council of Ministers for Research and Development of the European Union. He was also responsible for the coordination of the Portuguese policy on Information Society, and for the promotion of science education and scientific culture.

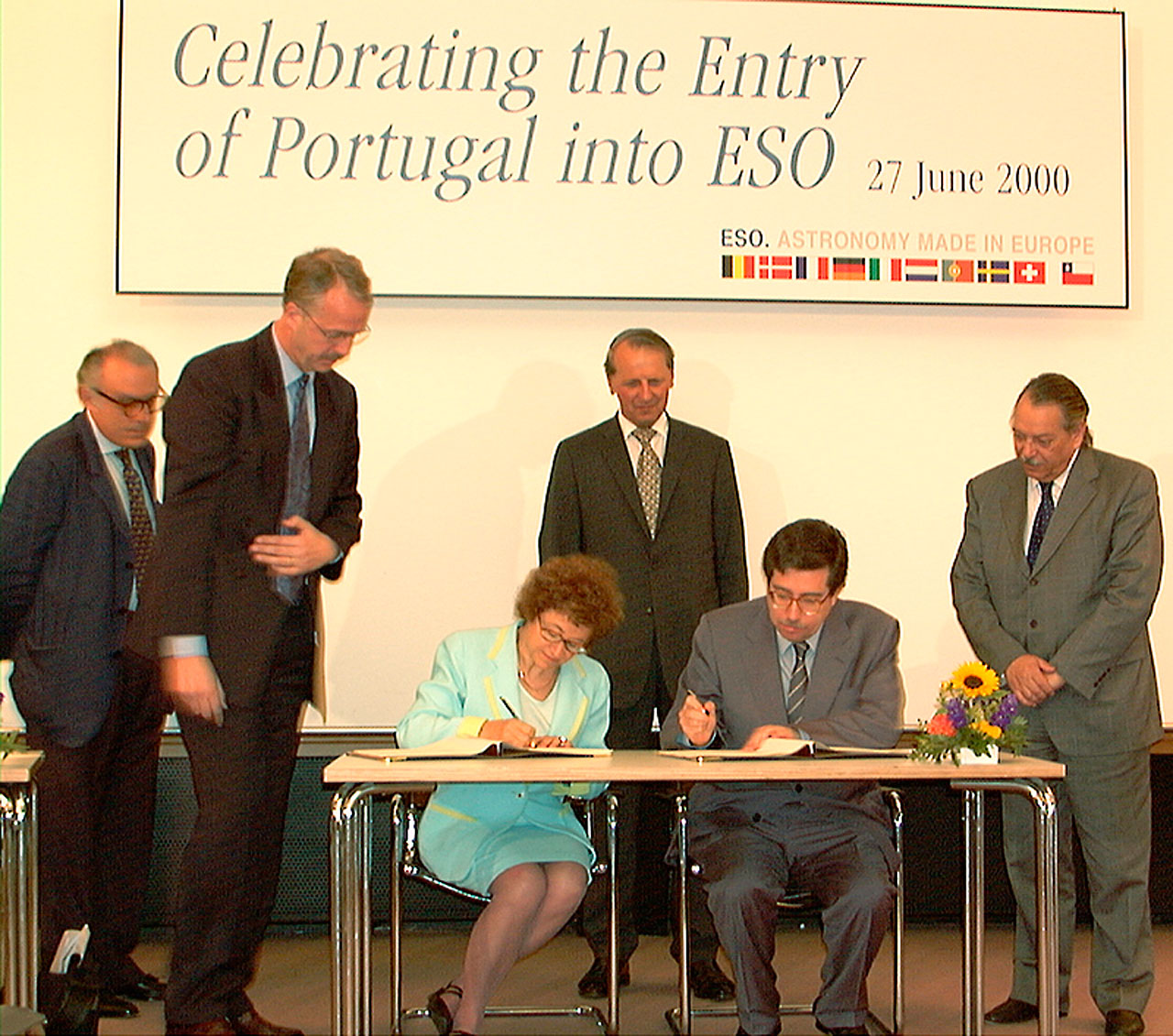
Gago signing the Portugal-ESO treaty

Throughout his career, Prof. Gago emphasised the link between teaching and research, and addressed issues such as whether universities should specialise more in teaching or in research and whether there were possible divergences between teaching and research priorities, although never managing to reach acceptable educational levels within some Portuguese higher education institutions. Prof. Gago was the founder of the Ciência Viva programme (since 1996), which on behalf of the Ministry of Science and Technology, aims to promote scientific and technological culture among the Portuguese population. "My generation's legacy will be that research and technology made great progress in being more accessible and understandable to the public. The present development of technical advancement would have been unthinkable if we were unable to rely on the basic technical knowledge of the average citizen," stated Prof. Gago.

He also fostered research that is increasingly carried out in a framework of international cooperation, as a chance for Portugal to develop new products and provide new types of knowledge-intensive services.

During his tenure as Minister for Science, Technology and Higher Education of the XVII Constitutional Government, Mariano Gago's Ministry was responsible for the compulsory closing of problematic and unreliable private higher education institutions (Independente University and Moderna University).

Mariano Gago was diagnosed with cancer in 2013. He died on 17 April 2015 of a sudden and unrelated illness.

== Career as minister in the Government of Portugal ==
- From 26 October 2009 to 20 June 2011: Minister of Science, Technology and Higher Education of the XVII Constitutional Government (Prime Minister José Sócrates)
- From 12 March 2005 to 26 October 2009: Minister of Science, Technology and Higher Education of the XVII Constitutional Government (Prime Minister José Sócrates)
- From 25 October 1999 to 6 April 2002: Minister of Science and Technology of the XIV Constitutional Government (Prime Minister António Guterres)
- From 28 October 1995 to 25 October 1999: Minister of Science and Technology of the XIII Constitutional Government (Prime Minister António Guterres)
