= Bárbara Guimarães =

Portuguese TV presenter and journalist

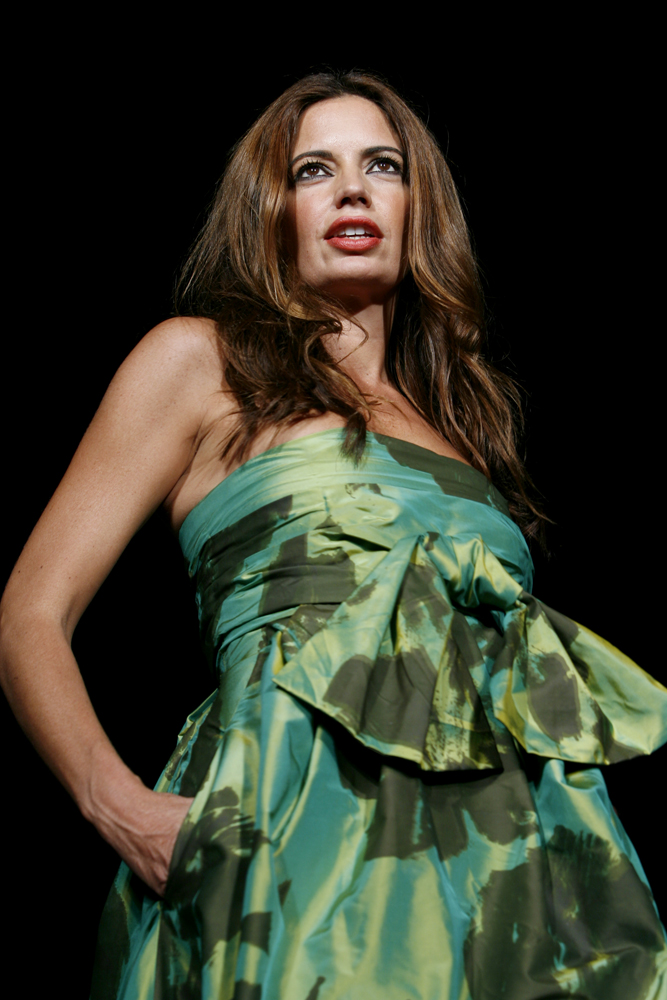
- Born: Bárbara dos Santos Guimarães; 21 April 1973 (age 53); Sá da Bandeira, Portuguese Angola (now Lubango, Angola)
- Occupations: TV presenter, journalist
- Spouse(s): Pedro Miguel Ramos (m. 1997; div. 2001) Manuel Maria Carrilho (m. 2003; div. 2013)
- Children: 2

Bárbara dos Santos Guimarães (born 21 April 1973) is a Portuguese TV presenter and journalist.

== Biography and career ==
Guimarães was born on 21 April 1973 in Sá da Bandeira, Portuguese Angola (now Lubango, Angola), the daughter of a sculptor and a primary school professor. She was delivered by the father of journalist Rodrigo Guedes de Carvalho, who shares the same name.

Starting at four months old, she lived in São João da Madeira, her mother's home town, until they moved to Lisbon when Bárbara was eight. She studied but later dropped her studies in international relations at Universidade Lusíada to become a journalist.

After going through CENJOR, Guimarães had her start as a reporter with TVI and soon would move on to the information desk, sharing the post with Artur Albarran and Sofia Carvalho in presenting the magazine of this station. On the same channel, she would go on to star in presenting shows for cultural magazines: the first being Primeira Fila e, and afterwards, 7 ponto 15.

As she began to build up her career as a journalist, she was hired by SIC, not to the information desk at the station in Carnaxide, but as an entertainment presenter. She would begin to garner great popularity in this role, with her presenting contests to a large audience in Portugal, such as Chuva de Estrelas and Furor, which would be followed by the social magazine Mundo Vip.

Guimarães would not leave behind, however, being a presenter in formats linked to the arts or the releasing of specials, with her conceiving with maestro António Victorino de Almeida, while still at SIC, the talk show Duetos Imprevistos. As SIC Notícias began to return to television with Sociedade das Belas-Artes, she would later move on to interview programs such as Oriente and Páginas Soltas, where she would interview some of the most important personalities of the artes, music, cinema, and literature. Guimarães would also begin to work on radio shows, specifically for Antena 1, where she presented Culto.

While part of SIC, she continued to be the main presenter of their broadcasts of the Golden Globes and the Campeonato da Língua Portuguesa. Upon leaving SIC Notícias, she would return to being a presenter on shows geared towards entertainment, such as the reality show Peso Pesado and talent shows such as Portugal Tem Talento and Família Superstar. Guimarães was also a jury member on Ídolos.

== Personal life ==
Guimarães married Pedro Miguel Ramos in 1997 in Punta Cana, Dominican Republic. She would later marry Manuel Maria Carrilho, with whom she had two children: Dinis Maria and Carlota Maria. They separated in 2013. In 2012, she was covered by GQ in a bold production.

In 2014, Guimarães began to date Ernesto Neves, better known as Kiki Neves, a son of Nené Neves, a notable figure in Portuguese autosport. The relationship ended in summer of 2015. From March 2017 to 2022, Guimarães had a relationship with businessman Carlos Pegado. In August 2018, she announced that she was diagnosed with breast cancer and had undergone surgery.

=== Domestic violence and neglect allegations ===
In October 2013, Guimarães presented a criminal complaint to the PSP for domestic violence. She formalized the complaint hours later after the police had been called to the residence where she lived with Carrilho during the time they had been married. The presenter afterwards said that she had suffered continuous physical attacks. Along with the complaint made on 17 October with the DIAP of Lisbon, she hired private security to prevent any additional attacks. Carrilho denied the accusation of domestic violence and said he had also brought forth a complaint against Guimarães for preventing him from entering their house. He also claimed that Guimarães had issues with alcoholism. Carrilho accused her of being a threat to their children due to her alcohol dependency.

At the time of Carrilho's much-publicised separation from Guimarães, magazine director Joana Morais Varela, who was married to Carrilho until their divorce in 1972, announced that she had suffered physical abuse from her first husband.

In October 2020, Carrilho was absolved of domestic violence charges against Guimarães. The Local Criminal Court of Lisbon confirmed the decision had already been prior and having the case be reopened by the decision of the Lisbon Court of Appeal.

Carrilho also pointed to her turbulent upbringing, as she had run away from home at 18 because her step-father "tried to violate her". He claimed that Guimarães would step back from friends to drink alcohol while also neglecting Carlota. On 27 April 2015, Carrilho was found guilty of defamation.

Guimarães sued Carrilho for "injuries, slander, and defamation". She also asked for a restraining order against Carrilho for her and their children. In January 2014, the Criminal Investigation Court of Lisbon prohibited Carrilho from contacting his ex-wife, or from being in close proximity or entering her residence. This decision was based on "practical suspicion", on Carrilho's part, for domestic violence.

An instructive decision made by the Criminal Investigation Court confirmed that there were indications that Guimarães had committed domestic violence against Carrilho. In May 2015, the judges of the Appeals Court decided to not bring Guimarães to trial and harshly criticise one of the judges at the Criminal Investigations Court who accused her of domestic violence against Carrilho.

In March 2016, she lost custody of her son, Dinis, who would go on to reside with Carrilho. On 19 February 2021, the police was called to Guimarães' house to take her daughter, Carlota, out of the residence, to send to her father, Carrilho, with Guimarães having also lost custody of her. In September 2021, after submitting to psychological tests and alcohol tests, she regained partial custody of Carlota for 2/3rds of the month, with the remaining third of the month being with Carrilho.

== Filmography ==
=== SIC ===
| Year(s) | Channel | Program | Notes |
|---|---|---|---|
| 1997 | SIC | Chuva de Estrelas 4 | Presenter |
| 1997–1998 | SIC | Chuva de Estrelas 5 | Presenter |
| 1998 | SIC | Furor | Presenter |
| 1998–1999 | SIC | Chuva de Estrelas 6 | Presenter |
| 1999–2000 | SIC | Chuva de Estrelas 7 | Presenter |
| 1999 | SIC | Duetos Improvistos | Presenter, with António Victorino de Almeida |
| 2001 | SIC Notícias | Terceiro Elemento | Presenter |
| 2001–2003 | SIC Notícias | Sociedade das Belas-Artes | Presenter |
| 2002 | SIC | Mentes Brilhantes | Presenter |
| 2002–2004 | SIC Notícias | Oriente | Presenter |
| 2006–2016 | SIC | Globos de Ouro | Presenter |
| 2006 | SIC | Exclusivo SIC | Presenter, with Ricardo Pereira |
| 2006 | SIC Notícias | Páginas Soltas | Presenter |
| 2006–2008 | SIC | Campeonato da Língua Portuguesa | Presenter |
| 2007 | SIC | Família Superstar | Presenter |
| 2008 | SIC | Natal de Esperança | Presenter |
| 2009 | SIC | Atreve-te a Cantar | Presenter |
| 2009 | SIC | MF - Sarilhos em Casa | Presenter, with Eduardo Madeira |
| 2010 | SIC | Verdade ou Talvez Não | Presenter |
| 2010 | SIC | Gala de Natal Arredonda | Presenter |
| 2011 | SIC | Portugal Tem Talento | Presenter |
| 2011 | SIC | Peso Pesado 2 | Presenter |
| 2012 | SIC | Ídolos 5 | Jury member |
| 2012 | SIC | Toca a Mexer | Presenter |
| 2013 | SIC | Olé | Presenter, with José Figueiras |
| 2013–2014 | SIC | Factor X 1 | Presenter, with João Manzarra |
| 2014 | SIC | O Poder do Amor | Presenter |
| 2015 | SIC | Peso Pesado: Teen | Presenter |
| 2017 | SIC | E agora o que é que eu faço? | Presenter |
| 2018 | SIC | Queridas Manhãs - Regresso às Aulas | Presenter |
| 2020 | SIC | 24 Horas de Vida | Presenter |
| 2020 | SIC | Central de Natal | Participant |
| 2021 / 2022 | SIC | Estamos em Casa | Presenter |
| 2021 / 2022 | SIC | Júlia | Presenter, in the absence of Júlia Pinheiro |
| 2021–2022 | SIC | Alô Marco Paulo | Presenter, alongside Marco Paulo, in the absence of Ana Marques |
| 2021 | SIC | Alô Portugal | Presenter, alongside José Figueiras, in the absence of Ana Marques |
| 2021 | SIC | A Máscara 3 | Competitor |
| 2022 | SIC | Cantor ou Impostor?') | Competitor |
| 2022–2024 | SIC Mulher | Irresistível | Presenter |
| 2023 | SIC | SIC 30 Anos - É Bom Vivermos Juntos | Participation |
| 2023 | SIC | Sangue Oculto | Special participation |
| 2024 | SIC Mulher | Temos de Falar | Presenter, with Ana Galvão and Ana Garcia Martins |
| 2024 | SIC | Hell's Kitchen - Famosos (2nd season) | Competitor |

=== TVI ===
- Passaporte
- Primeira Fila
- Novo Jornal

=== Theatre ===
Guimarães debuted in theatre on 21 November 2016, playing the role of Ava Gardner at A Barraca theatre in Lisbon.
