= Peso Pesado 2 =

- Genre: Reality television
- Created by: Dave Broom (original U.S. series)
- Developed by: FremantleMedia Portugal
- Presented by: Bárbara Guimarães
- Starring: Rui Barros; Conceição Gonçalves; Teresa Branco; Nuno Queiroz Ribeiro "O Comando"
- Country of origin: Portugal
- Original language: Portuguese
- No. of episodes: 72 + finale

Production
- Executive producer: Ana Torres
- Producer: Nuno Martins
- Production locations: Alcácer do Sal, Portugal
- Running time: 60 minutes (approx.)

Original release
- Network: SIC
- Release: 2 October – 31 December 2011

Related
- Peso Pesado 1 (2011); The Biggest Loser (U.S.)

Peso Pesado 2 is the second season of the SIC entertainment show Peso Pesado (English: Heavy Weight), the Portuguese version of the original American reality television series The Biggest Loser. It premiered on 2 October 2011 and concluded after 13 weeks of emission (72 daily episodes) with the grand finale, on 31 December 2011. Unlike the debut season, the contestants entered the show as individual participants, not as couples. The winner was Marco, with a total weight loss percentage of 40.65%, equivalent to 58.6 kg (129 lb); he received a prize of €50,000. The eliminated contestant that achieved the biggest weight loss percentage – and won a prize of €25,000 – was José, with 38.08%, equivalent to 65.3 kg (144 lb).

This season's host was television presenter Bárbara Guimarães, who replaced Júlia Pinheiro. Returning from the first season were personal trainer Rui Barros, nutritionist Teresa Branco, and the Commando. Season one trainer Sara Freitas was replaced by fitness instructor Conceição Gonçalves, while Nuno Queiroz Ribeiro was introduced as the show's healthy cuisine chef.

== Contestants ==
Name (age, location)	Red vs. Blue	Pairs Teams	Individuals	Status	Votes (%)	Notes
Vera (Returned Week 2)				Not selected (Week 1)		(Note: Marco, Marta, and Vera were not admitted to the ranch by the personal trainers, after the first day selection training. However, after the second weigh-in, it was revealed that they had always been training secretly with the Commando, outside of the ranch.)
Marta (Returned Week 2)				Not selected (Week 1)		
Marco (Returned Week 2)				Not selected (Week 1)		
Carolina (31, Lisbon)	Red Team			Eliminated (Week 1)	4 in 6 (66.67%)	
Bruno (Returned Week 5)	Blue Team			Eliminated (Week 2)	4 in 6 (66.67%)	
Vera (20, Valongo)				Eliminated (Week 2)		(Note: Vera was eliminated as she had the lowest weight loss percentage among the three contestants secretly training outside of the ranch.)
Helena (43, Matosinhos)	Blue Team			Eliminated (Week 3)	4 in 6 (66.67%)	(Note: Helena and João were originally assigned to the Red Team, while José and Carlos were originally allocated to the Blue Team. However, during Week 2, Andreia's immunity gave her the power to switch these contestants from one team to the other.)
José (38, Amadora)	Red Team			Withdrew (Week 4) (Note: José had to withdraw from the competition due to a serious ankle injury, which had to undergo surgical intervention.)		
Alexandre (Returned Week 5)	Red Team			Eliminated (Week 4)		(Note: Alexandre was picked by Margarida to leave the show as a result of her immunity-granted power to eliminate a Red Team male member.)
Alfredo (34, Camarate)	Red Team			Eliminated (Week 4)	3 in 4 (75%)	
Ana (Returned Week 10)	Blue Team	Aqua Team		Eliminated (Week 5)	3 in 4 (75%)	
Andreia (19, Felgueiras)	Red Team	Aqua Team		Eliminated (Week 5)	3 in 4 (75%)	
Carlos (32, Barreiro)	Red Team	Brown Team		Eliminated (Week 7)	Direct vote	
João (24, Ferreira do Alentejo)	Blue Team	Brown Team		Eliminated (Week 7)	Direct vote	
Alexandre (Returned Week 10)	Red Team	Green Team		Eliminated (Week 8)	3 in 3 (100%)	
Bruno (33, Aveiro)	Blue Team	Green Team	Black	Eliminated (Week 9)	5 in 5 (100%)	
Margarida (21, Laranjeiro)	Blue Team	Yellow Team	Black	Eliminated (Week 10)	4 in 6 (66.67%)	
Ana (24, Alcobaça)	Blue Team	Aqua Team	Black	Eliminated (Week 11)		(Note: Ana was eliminated directly as a result of finishing last in the Week 11 challenge.)
Marta (31, Lisbon)	Red Team	Orange Team	Black	Eliminated (Week 11)	2 in 4 (50%)	(Note: Marta tied with Sara in the elimination voting, but was eliminated as a result of a lower weekly weight loss percentage.)
Alexandre (Returned for Finale)	Red Team	Green Team	Black	Eliminated (Week 12)	2 in 3 (66.67%)	
Ivo (22, Vila Nova de Gaia)	Red Team	Purple Team	Black	Disqualified		(Note: Ivo was disqualified in the week before the finale for breaking a competition rule regarding the consumption of weight loss-promoting substances.)
Diogo (34, Setúbal)	Blue Team	Orange Team	Black	Lost Portugal's vote for third finalist		
Alexandre (35, Almada)	Red Team	Green Team	Black	Third place		(Note: Alexandre was brought back to the competition for a third time, replacing Ivo in Portugal's vote to select the third finalist, following his disqualification.)
Sara (25, Braga)	Blue Team	Purple Team	Black	Runner-up		
Marco (22, Lavradio)	Blue Team	Yellow Team	Black	Peso Pesado		

== Weigh-Ins ==
Key

PP	Peso Pesado of the Week
Im	Immunity (challenge or weigh-in)
§	Withdrew before weigh-in
†	Eliminated or training outside of the ranch
1st	Peso Pesado winner (€50,000)
2nd	Peso Pesado runner-up
3rd	Peso Pesado third-place
HW	Peso Pesado at-home winner (€25,000)

=== Results ===
The contestants are listed in reverse chronological order of elimination:

Contestant	Starting Weight	Week												Finale	Weight Lost	Percentage Lost
Contestant	Starting Weight	1	2	3	4	5	6	7	8	9	10	11	12	Finale	Weight Lost	Percentage Lost
Marco	143.8	†	130.2	128.6	124	120.9^{Im}	116.7^{PP}	113.2	108.5	108.6^{Im}	103.3	100.7^{PP}	97.9^{Im}	85.2	58.6	40.65%^{1st}
Sara	109.3	104.8	102.1	100.2	96.6	93.5^{PP}	90.9	89.9	85.9^{PP}	84.0	82.7	81.3	77.4^{PP}	68.2	41.1	37.60%^{2nd}
Alexandre	144.1	139.4	135.5	132.2	†	127.4^{Im}	123.2	121.5	118.7	121.3^{†}	113.1^{PP}	110.6	107.2	105.7	38.4	26.65%^{3rd}
Diogo	157.5	148.2	145.2	142.8	138.2	135.2	134	130	127.2^{Im}	123.9	120.5	117.5	114.4	107.4^{†}	50.1	31.81%
Ivo	146	138.6	134.8	133.1	128.2^{PP}	125.6	121.8	120.6	118.7	114.3	111.6	111.2^{Im}	107.4	Disqualified (no weigh-in)		
Marta	115.4	†	105.5	103.4	100.6	98.3	96.2	96.3	92.4^{Im}	89.9^{PP}	86.9	85.9	†	78.7^{†}	36.7	31.80%
Ana	129.1	122.4	119.2	117.6	114	111.6	107.9^{†}				101.1	†		94.8^{†}	34.3	26.57%
Margarida	135.6	128.9	126.2	124.8^{Im}	121.5^{Im}	118.6^{Im}	116.5	113.9	112.6	110.6	108.8	†		95.9^{†}	39.7	29.28%
Bruno	198.6	191.9	189.6	†		181.5^{Im}	177.7	176.6	173.3	171.8	†			158.7^{†}	39.9	20.09%
Carlos	148.7	140.8	137.2	133.7	129.7	125.9	122.7^{Im}	118.9^{PP}	108.9^{†}		106.5	†		92.6^{†}	56.1	37.73%
João	125	118.3	114.2^{PP}	112.5	109.3	106.1	104.1^{Im}	100.9	93.0^{†}		87.8	†		82^{†}	43.0	34.40%
Andreia	123.4	120.5^{Im}	118^{Im}	116.2	113.6	110.3	107.9^{†}				†			101.1^{†}	22.3	18.07%
Alfredo	214.7	208.3	203.1	197.3	192.9	181.6^{†}					†			176.2^{†}	38.5	17.93%
José	171.5	159.7^{PP}	155.7	150.7^{PP}	§	128.4^{†}					†			106.2^{†}	65.3	38.08%^{HW}
Helena	116.7	116.5	114.1	113.3	104^{†}						†			98.5^{†}	18.2	15.60%
Vera	100	†	94.1	88.6^{†}							†			82.3^{†}	17.7	17.70%
Carolina	109	105.7	98.8^{†}								†			88.9^{†}	20.1	18.44%

=== Weigh-In Difference History ===
Name	Week												
Name	1	2	3	4	5	6	7	8	9	10	11	12	Finale
Marco	−13.6^{†}		−1.6	–4.6	–3.1	–4.2	−3.5	–4.7	+0.1	–5.3	–2.6	–2.8	–12.7
Sara	–4.5	–2.7	–1.9	–3.6	–3.1	–2.6	–1.0	–4.0	–1.9	–1.3	–1.4	–3.9	–9.2
Alexandre	–4.7	–3.9	–3.3	–3.8^{†}		–4.2	–1.7	–2.8	+2.6^{†}	–8.2	–2.5	–3.4	−1.5
Diogo	–9.3	–3.0	–2.4	–4.6	–3.0	–1.2	–4.0	–2.8	–3.3	–3.4	–3.0	–3.1	–7.0^{†}
Ivo	–7.4	–3.8	–1.7	–4.9	–2.6	–3.8	–1.2	–1.9	–4.4	–2.7	–0.4	–3.8	?
Marta	−9.9^{†}		−2.1	−2.8	−2.3	−2.1	+0.1	−3.9	−2.5	−3.0	−1.0	−7.2^{†}	
Ana	−6.7	−3.2	−1.6	−3.6	−2.4	−3.7^{†}				−6.8	−6.3^{†}		
Margarida	−6.7	−2.7	−1.4	−3.3	−2.9	−2.1	−2.6	−1.3	−2.0	−1.8	−12.9^{†}		
Bruno	−6.7	−2.3	−8.1^{†}			−3.8	−1.1	−3.3	−1.5	−13.1^{†}			
Carlos	−7.9	−3.6	−3.5	−4.0	−3.8	−3.2	−3.8	–10.0^{†}		−2.4^{†}	−13.9^{†}		
João	–6.7	–4.1	–1.7	–3.2	–3.2	–2.0	–3.2	–7.9^{†}		−5.2^{†}	−5.8^{†}		
Andreia	−2.9	−2.5	−1.8	−2.6	−3.3	–2.4^{†}				−6.8^{†}			
Alfredo	−6.4	−5.2	−5.8	−4.4	−11.3^{†}					−5.4^{†}			
José	−11.8	−4.0	−5.0	−22.3^{†}						−22.2^{†}			
Helena	−0.2	−2.4	−0.8	−9.3^{†}						−5.5^{†}			
Vera	−5.9^{†}		−5.5^{†}							−6.3^{†}			
Carolina	−3.3	−6.9^{†}								−9.9^{†}			

=== Weigh-In Percentage History ===
Name	Week												
Name	1	2	3	4	5	6	7	8	9	10	11	12	Finale
Marco	−9.46%^{†}		−1.23%	–3.58%	–2.50%	–3.47%	−3.00%	–4.06%	+0.09%	–4.79%	–2.52%	–2.78%	−12.97%
Sara	–4.12%	–2.58%	–1.86%	–3.59%	–3.21%	–2.78%	–1.10%	–4.45%	–2.21%	–1.55%	–1.69%	–4.80%	−11.89%
Alexandre	–3.26%	–2.80%	–2.44%	–3.63%^{†}		–3.30%	–1.38%	–2.30%	+2.19%	−6.76%	–2.21%	–3.07%	−1.40%
Diogo	–5.90%	–2.02%	–1.65%	–3.22%	–2.17%	–0.89%	–2.99%	–2.15%	–2.59%	–2.74%	–2.49%	–2.64%	−6.12%^{†}
Ivo	–5.07%	–2.74%	–1.26%	–3.68%	–2.03%	–3.03%	–1.07%	–1.58%	–3.71%	–2.36%	–0.36%	–3.42%	?
Marta	−8.58%^{†}		−1.99%	−2.71%	−2.29%	−2.14%	+0.10%	−4.05%	−2.71%	−3.34%	−1.15%	−8.38%^{†}	
Ana	−5.19%	−2.61%	−1.34%	−3.06%	−2.11%	−3.32%^{†}				−6.30%	−6.23%^{†}		
Margarida	−4.94%	−2.09%	−1.11%	−2.64%	−2.39%	−1.77%	−2.23%	−1.14%	−1.78%	−1.63%	−11.86%^{†}		
Bruno	−3.37%	−1.20%	−4.27%^{§}			−2.09%	−0.62%	−1.87%	−0.87%	−7.62%^{†}			
Carlos	−5.31%	−2.56%	−2.55%	−2.99%	−2.93%	−2.54%	−3.10%	−8.41%^{†}		−2.20%^{†}	−13.05%^{†}		
João	–5.36%	–3.47%	–1.49%	–2.84%	–2.93%	–1.89%	–3.07%	–7.83%^{†}		−5.59%^{†}	−6.61%^{†}		
Andreia	−2.35%	−2.07%	−1.53%	−2.24%	−2.90%	−2.18%^{†}				−6.30%^{†}			
Alfredo	−2.98%	−2.50%	−2.86%	−2.23%	−5.86%^{†}					−2.97%^{†}			
José	−6.88%	−2.50%	−3.21%	−14.8%^{†}						−17.29%^{†}			
Helena	−0.17%	−2.06%	−0.70%	−8.21%^{†}						−5.29%^{†}			
Vera	−5.9%^{‡}		−5.84%^{†}							−7.11%^{†}			
Carolina	−3.03%	−6.53%^{†}								−10.02%^{†}			

== Elimination Voting History ==
Key

—	Unable to vote (secretly training outside of the ranch)
TS	Unable to vote (team safe from elimination)
§	Withdrew
↓Y	Unable to vote (below yellow line)
?	Vote not revealed
X	Direct elimination (challenge, immunity power, or national vote)

Name	Week												
Name	1	2	3	4	5	6	7	8	9	10	11	12	Finale
Name	Carolina	Vera, Bruno	Helena	Alexandre, José, Alfredo	Ana, Andreia	None (Note: Marco and Margarida (Yellow Team) were unanimously voted to leave the contest. However, they were handed a lifeline: on the following weigh-in, if their weight loss percentage was above the average weight loss percentage of all the other teams, they would be given the power to eliminate one opponent team; otherwise, they would be immediately eliminated.)	Carlos, João	Alexandre	Bruno	Margarida	Ana, Marta	Alexandre	Diogo
Marco	—	—	?	TS	Ana, Andreia	↓Y	Carlos, João	Alexandre	Bruno	Sara	Sara	Diogo	Peso Pesado
Sara	TS	Bruno	Helena	TS	Ana, Andreia	Marco, Margarida	↓Y	Alexandre	↓Y	↓Y	↓Y	Alexandre	Runner-up
Alexandre	Carolina	TS	TS	X	Carlos, João	Marco, Margarida	↓Y	↓Y	Eliminated (Week 8); Returned (Week 10)	Sara	Sara	↓Y	Third-place
Diogo	TS	Bruno	Helena	TS	Ana, Andreia	↓Y	↓Y	Alexandre	Bruno	Margarida	Marta	↓Y	X
Ivo	?	TS	TS	Alfredo	Ana, Andreia	Marco, Margarida	↓Y	Alexandre	?	Margarida	Marta	Alexandre	Disqualified
Marta	—	—	TS	Alfredo	Ana, Andreia	↓Y	↓Y	Alexandre	Bruno	Margarida	↓Y	Eliminated (Week 11)	
Ana	TS	?	Helena	TS	↓Y	Eliminated (Week 5), Returned (Week 10)				Margarida	X	Re-eliminated (Week 11)	
Margarida	TS	Bruno	Helena	TS	Ana, Andreia	↓Y	Carlos, João	Alexandre	?	↓Y	Eliminated (Week 10)		
Bruno	TS	Margarida	Eliminated (Week 2); Returned (Week 5)		Carlos, João	Marco, Margarida	↓Y	↓Y	↓Y	Re-eliminated (Week 9)			
Carlos	TS	TS	TS	Alfredo	↓Y	Marco, Margarida	↓Y	Eliminated (Week 7)					
João	?	?	Ana	TS	↓Y	Marco, Margarida	↓Y	Eliminated (Week 7)					
Andreia	Carolina	TS	TS	Carlos	↓Y	Eliminated (Week 5)							
Alfredo	Carolina	TS	TS	Marta	Eliminated (Week 4)								
José	TS	TS	TS	§	Withdrew (Week 4)								
Helena	Carolina	Bruno	Diogo	Eliminated (Week 3)									
Vera	—	—	Eliminated (Week 2)										
Carolina	João	Eliminated (Week 1)											
