= Joana Morais Varela =

Portuguese editor and translator (born 1952)

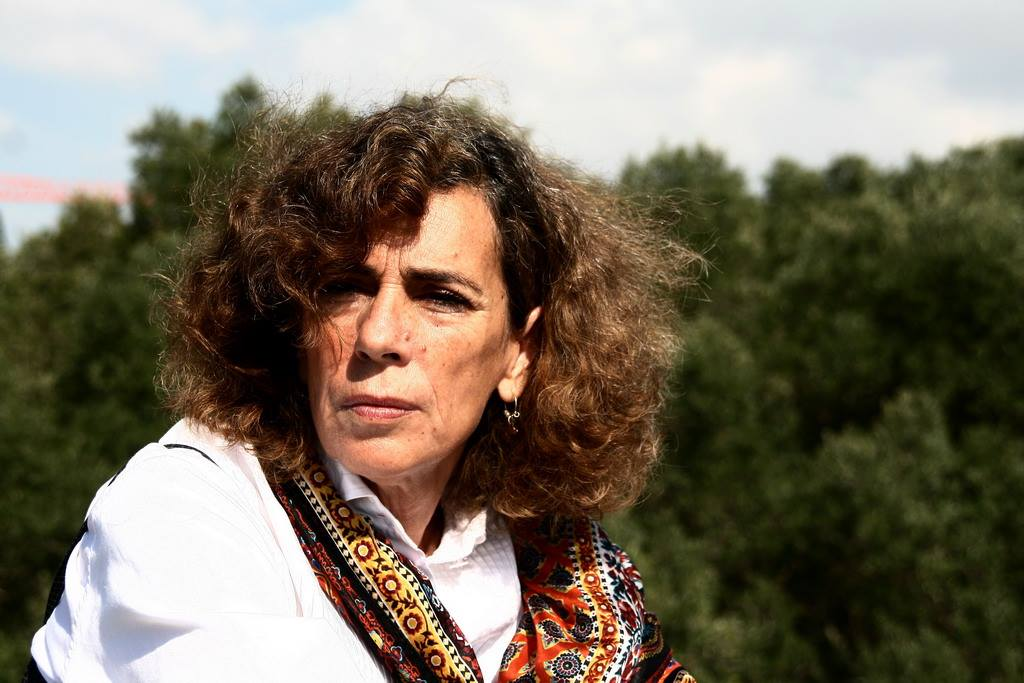
- Joana Morais Varela, 2017
- Born: 29 January 1952 (age 74); Marinha Grande, Portugal
- Occupations: Translator and director of literary magazine
- Years active: 40
- Known for: Director of Colóquio Letras magazine 1996-2008

Maria Joana Custódio de Morais Varela, known as Joana Morais Varela (born 1952), is a Portuguese magazine director, editor and translator. She is best known for her role as director of the literary magazine, Colóquio Letras, from 1996 to 2008.

== Early life ==
Varela was born in Marinha Grande in the Leiria District of Portugal on 29 January 1952, the daughter of Carlos José Pestana de Abreu Varela and Maria da Ascensão Ferreira Custódio de Morais. She is the sister of the economist and banker, António Morais Varela, a former administrator of the Bank of Portugal. Morais graduated in philosophy from the Faculty of Arts of the University of Lisbon, where she was a student of David Mourão-Ferreira, who she subsequently succeeded as director of Colóquio Letras.

== Career ==
Varela was a secondary school teacher from 1975 to 1978, and also taught at the Instituto Superior de Línguas e Administração (Superior Institute of Languages and Administration) at Santarém. Between 1980 and 1985 she worked at the Instituto Português do Livro (Portuguese Book Institute). She was appointed director of Colóquio Letras, published by the Calouste Gulbenkian Foundation, in 1996, leaving in controversial circumstances in early 2009.

Varela published a book of poetry, Os Amores Perfeitos (Perfect Loves), in 1983. However, she is mainly known as a translator, translating Milan Kundera, James Joyce, Michel Tournier, Antoine de Saint-Exupéry, Albert Cohen and Leopoldo Alas, among others, sometimes for children's books. She organized the first Portuguese book fairs in Cape Verde and Mozambique in 1981 and 1983, respectively, and coordinated Portuguese participation in the Frankfurt Book Fair between 1983 and 1985. Additionally, she collaborated with the Portuguese Association of Editors and Booksellers in producing the first Portuguese Catalogue of Available Books, and organised exhibitions of Portuguese literature in Brazil and Spain. From the catalogue of those exhibitions, she developed a Chronological Dictionary of Portuguese Authors. Active in promoting the translation of Portuguese authors into other languages, she also presented a literary programme on the Portuguese state broadcaster, RTP, in 1983–84.

== Colóquio Letras ==
In 1984, Varela began working at Colóquio Letras and, following the death of Mourão-Ferreira, she would become its director in 1996. She continued the practice she had already started of publishing issues on specific topics, such as one on medieval Portuguese literature (142), one devoted to Mourão-Ferreira (145/6), and others on José Saramago (151/2) and Almeida Garrett (153/4). In 2008, she was suspended from her role as director of the magazine for allegedly using "injurious statements and expressions, directed at different members of the administration". Prior to this she had been invited to join the magazine's new editorial board, which she declined as she regarded it as a demotion from her existing post. Her suspension, which led to dismissal from the post, originated from a memo she sent to all staff of the Gulbenkian Foundation concerning the editorial board proposal. She received considerable support from people in the Portuguese literary world, who signed an open letter online stressing that the magazine under her directorship had been "a model of imaginative, free and rigorous publication".

== Private life ==
Varela married Manuel Maria Carrilho, an academic, politician and former minister of culture in Portugal, in 1972. The marriage ended in divorce. She later remarried. At the time of Carrilho's much-publicised separation from his second wife, television personality Bárbara Guimarães, Varela announced that she had suffered physical abuse from her first husband.
