= Nuno Júdice =

Portuguese writer (1949–2024)

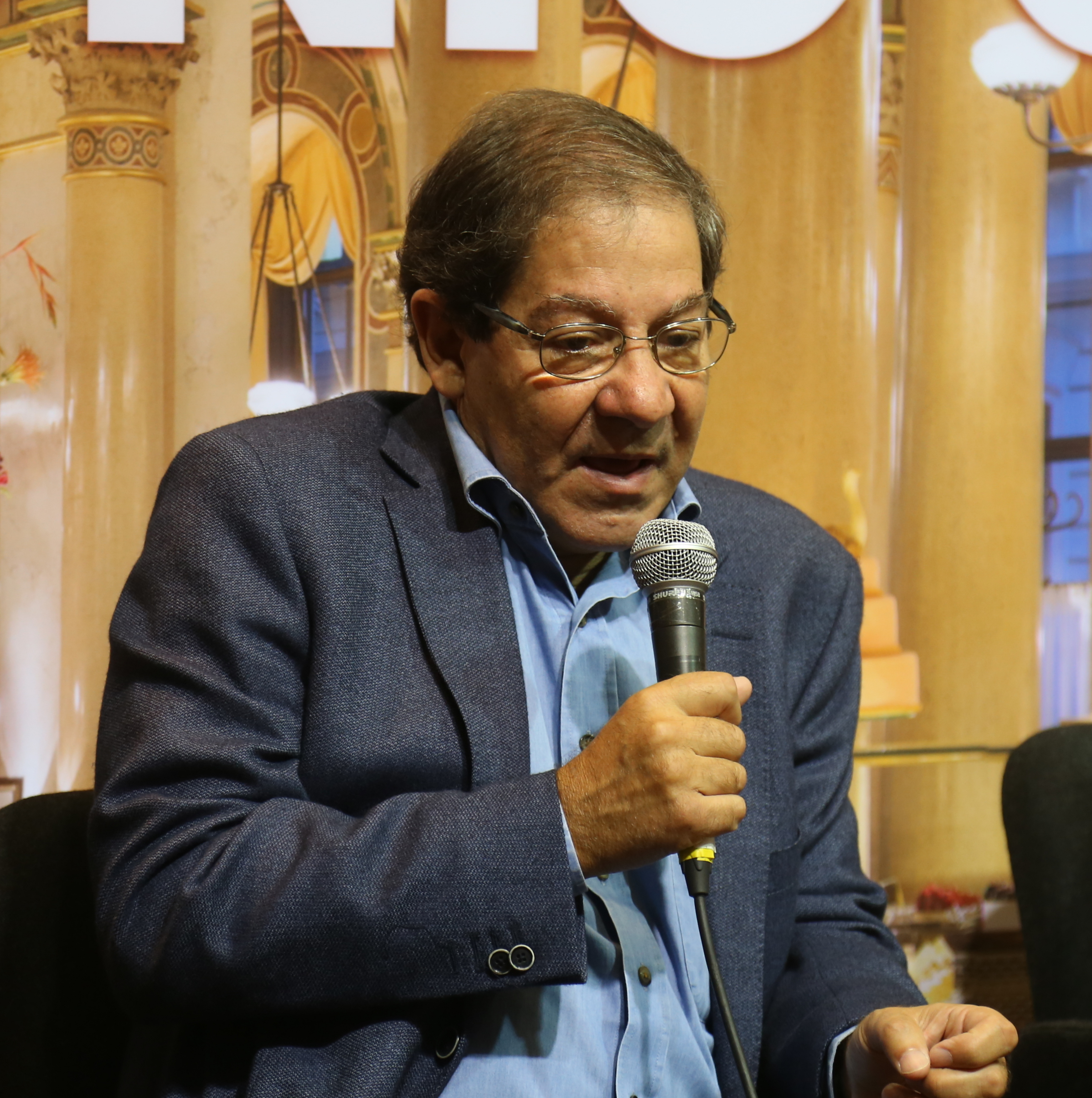
Júdice at Gothenburg book fair 2014

Nuno Júdice OSE (29 April 1949 – 17 March 2024) was a Portuguese essayist, poet, writer, novelist and academic.

== Biography ==
Júdice was a poet and fiction writer. He was born in Mexilhoeira Grande, Algarve. His literary debut was with the Concept of Poem in 1972. He graduated in Romance Philology from the University of Lisbon and obtained the degree of Doctor from the New University of Lisbon (Universidade Nova), where he was a full professor, presenting in 1989 a thesis on Medieval Literature. He published anthologies, critical editions of literary studies and maintained as a regular contributor in the press. He received Spain's Queen Sofia Ibero-American Poetry Prize in 2013, awarded by the Spanish National Heritage and the University of Salamanca, in the amount of 42,100 euros. He was a member of the editorial board of the magazine Time and Mode between 1969 and 1974. He was the commissioner for the area of Literature "Portugal as a country-theme" at the 49th Frankfurt Book Fair. As a popularizer of Portuguese literature of the twentieth century, he launched in 1993, "Voyage dans un siècle de la Littérature Portugaise". He also organized the European Week of Poetry, under the "Lisbon'94 - European Capital of Culture". In 1996, he released the literary magazine Tobacconist, edited by "Casa Fernando Pessoa". In 1997, he was appointed Cultural Counselor of the Embassy of Portugal and Director of the Camões Institute in Paris. In 2009, he assumed the direction of Colóquio Letras published by the Calouste Gulbenkian Foundation. He had works translated in Spain, Italy, Venezuela, England and France, where he published Un chant dans l’épaisseur du temps in the Collection Poésie chez Éditions Gallimard. He also continued to work for theater and translated authors such as Molière, Shakespeare and Emily Dickinson in his later years. His name was assigned to the Poetry Prize of the City Council Aveiro, Portugal. He was curator for the cultural area José Saramago Foundation, created in 2008. He received the degree of "Oficial da Ordem de Santiago e Espada" (Officer of the Order of Santiago and Sword), in Portugal, and in France, the Officier degree of Ordre des Arts et des Lettres (Officer of Arts and Letters).

Nuno Júdice died on 17 March 2024, at the age of 74.

== Published works ==
=== Poetry ===
- The Concept of Poem A Noção de Poema (1972)
- The Audible Peacock O Pavão Sonoro (1972)
- Critique of Domestic parallelepiped Crítica Doméstica dos Paralelepípedos (1973)
- The Countless Waters As Inumeráveis Águas (1974)
- The Mechanism of Fragmentation Romantic O Mecanismo Romântico da Fragmentação (1975)
- In the Arms of a tiny Light Nos Braços da Exígua Luz (1976)
- The Cutting in Emphasis O Corte na Ênfase (1978)
- The Flight of Igitur in glass data O Voo de Igitur num Copo de Dados (1981)
- The Sharing of Myths A Partilha Dos Mitos (1982)
- Lyre of Lichen Lira de Líquen (1985 Prize Pen Club Portuguese)
- The Condescension of Being A Condescendência do Ser (1988)
- Enumeration of Shadows Enumeração de Sombras (1989)
- The Rules of Perspective As Regras da Perspectiva (1990) D. Dinis Prize (1990)
- A Straight from October Uma Sequência de Outubro - Commissioner for Europália (1991)
- Poetical Works 1972-1985 Obra Poética 1972-1985 (1991)
- A Corner in the thickness of Time Um Canto na Espessura do Tempo (1992)
- Meditation on Ruins Meditação sobre Ruínas (1994), Grand Prix of Poetry of the Portuguese Association of Writers, 1995, finalist of the European Prize for Literature Aristeion)
- The Movement of the World O Movimento do Mundo (1996)
- Poems Aloud Poemas em Voz Alta- with CD of poems spoken by Natalia Luiza (1996)
- The Fountain of life A Fonte da Vida (1997)
- Kidnappings / Enlévements (1998, selected poems, with illustrations by Jorge Martins)
- General Theory of Feeling Teoria Geral do Sentimento (1999)
- Collected Poems 1967-2000 Poesia Reunida 1967–2000
- Water Lines (2000)
- Peter Remembering Agnes Pedro lembrando Inês (2001)
- Rhymes and Accounts (2001), recognized with the Award Review 2000, by the Portuguese Center of the International Association of Literary Critics (AICL)
- Mapping Emotions Cartografia de Emoções (2002)
- The State of the Field O Estado dos Campos (2003)
- Variable Geometry Geometria variável (2005)
- Geography of Chaos (photo Duarte Belo) (2005)
- The Simplest Things As coisas mais simples (2006)
- The Matter of the Poem A Matéria do Poema (2008)
- The Brief of Everlasting Feeling O Breve Sentimento do Eterno (2008)
- Basic Concepts Guide Guia de Conceitos Básicos (2010)
- Random browsing Navegação de Acaso (2013)

=== Essays ===
- The Age's «Orpheus» A Era de «Orpheu» (1986)
- The Space in Text Medieval Tale O Espaço do Conto no Texto Medieval (1991)
- The Poetic Process O Processo Poético (1992)
- Portugal, Language and Culture Portugal, Língua e Cultura - Commissioner for Seville Exhibition (1992)
- Voyage dans un Siècle de Littérature Portugaise (1993)
- Journey through a century of Portuguese literature Viagem por um século de literatura portuguesa (1997)
- The Masks of the Poem As Máscaras do Poema (1998)
- B.I. Little Red Riding Hood B.I. do Capuchinho Vermelho (2003)
- The journey of words: Study of Poetry A viagem das palavras: estudo sobre poesia (2005)
- The Phenomenon Narrative: from the Popular Tale to Contemporary Fiction O fenómeno narrativo: do conto popular à ficção contemporânea (2005)
- The Certificate of Stories A certidão das histórias (2006)
- the abecedarian of critical O ABC da Crítica (2010)

=== Fiction ===
- Last word: "Yes Última Palavra: «Sim» (1977)
- Plankton Plâncton (1981)
- Religious Shroud Manta Religiosa (1982)
- The Treasure of the Queen of Sheba Postmodern Tale, O Tesouro da Rainha de Sabá (1984)
- Adage Adágio (1984)
- The Rosebush of Thorn A Roseira de Espinho (1994)
- The Scarlet Woman, briefer A Mulher Escarlate, Brevíssima (1997)
- Eve of Shadows Vésperas de Sombra (1998)
- For All Ages Por Todos os Séculos (1999)
- The Tree of Miracles A Árvore dos Milagres(2000)
- The Idea of Love and Other Tales A Ideia do Amor e Outros contos(2003)
- The Angel of the Storm O anjo da tempestade (2004)
- The Enigma of Salome O Enigma de Salomé (2007)
- The Stations of the Cross Os Passos da Cruz (2009)
- Two Dialogues between a priest and a dying Dois Diálogos entre um padre e um moribundo (2010)
- The Complex of Sagittarius, O Complexo de Sagitário (2011)

== Awards ==
- Pablo Neruda Poetry Prize, (1975), O Mecanismo Romântico da Fragmentação (The Mechanism of Fragmentation Romantic);
- Pen Club, (1985), Lira de Líquen (Lyre of Lichen);
- D. Dinis Prize from Mateus Foundation (1990), As Regras da Perspectiva (The Rules of Perspective);
- Portuguese Association of Writers, (1994), Meditação sobre Ruínas (Meditation on Ruins);
- Prize of the Portuguese Association of Writers, (1995),
- Eça de Queiroz Prize for Literature of the Municipality of Lisbon, (1995), Meditação sobre Ruínas (Meditation on Ruins);
- Award Bordalo of the House of Press, (1999), Por Todos os Séculos (For All Ages)
- Award Review 2000 by the Portuguese Center of the International Association of Literary Critics AICL (2000), Rimas e Contas (Rhymes and Accounts)
- Ana Hatherly Prize from Chamber of Funchal, (2003), O Estado dos Campos (The State of the Field);
- Fernando Namora Prize (2004), O Anjo da Tempestade (The Angel of the Storm);
- Spain's Queen Sofia Ibero-American Poetry Prize (2013).
