= Fernando Gomes da Silva =

Portuguese agronomist and politician

Minister of Agriculture, Rural Development and Fisheries
- In office 28 October 1995 – 3 October 1998
- Preceded by: António Duarte Silva
- Succeeded by: Luís Capoulas Santos

Personal details
- Born: 20 July 1938 (age 88) Lisbon, Portugal
- Party: Socialist Party
- Occupation: Politician and agronomist

Fernando Manuel Van-Zeller Gomes da Silva (born 20 July 1938) (GCMAIC) is a agronomist and politician from Portugal.

== Biography ==
Fernando Gomes da Silva was born in São Jorge de Arroios, Lisbon, on 20 July 1938, son of Virgílio Ramos Gomes da Silva and Laura van Zeller Pereira Palha, of Dutch and German descent.

He was responsible for the Ministry of Agriculture, Rural Development and Fisheries from 28 October 1995 to 3 October 1998, part of the XIII Constitutional Government of Portugal.

In 1996, when he was a minister in the midst of the mad cow disease crisis, he ate beef millet in a restaurant in Luxembourg, arguing, in his view, that in places where the disease did not proliferate, there was no risk in eating beef. He was criticised in particular by António Campos, who, as a PS member of the European Parliament, was trying to put the mad cow disease crisis on the agenda against the interests of livestock farmers and butchers. European legislation against the mad cow disease crisis was not passed until 1998.

In 2010 and 2015, Gomes da Silva pledged that he would repeat the act of eating beef millet in the event of a health crisis in relation to beef, arguing that the gesture was educational and, in his view, misunderstood due to "hysteria" and the public's lack of understanding of the issue. In 1996, he joined a farmers' demonstration in front of the Ministry of Agriculture in Lisbon against the approval of a measure in the European Union's Common Agricultural Policy which, as minister, he had failed to prevent at a meeting of the Council of the European Union.

Also in 1996, the newspaper O Independente published news about alleged favors for Fernando Gomes da Silva as minister, namely the victory, in April 1996, of a company owned by Gomes da Silva's son in a Ministry of Agriculture tender to evaluate the use of EU funds in the agriculture sector in Portugal. In 1999, he was accused by the Public Prosecutor's Office of fraud in obtaining a subsidy, with the newspaper O Independente reporting the existence of a report by Companhia das Lezírias that Fernando Gomes da Silva was involved in falsifying invoices worth 9630 escudos (around 48,150 euros). This accusation was not followed up.

On 17 January 2006 he was awarded the Order of Entrepreneurial Merit.

His son, Francisco Gomes da Silva, was Secretary of State for Forestry and Rural Development in the XIX Constitutional Government of Portugal (PSD/CDS-PP) between 2013 and 2014.

== See also ==
- Ministry of Agriculture, Rural Development and Fisheries
- Order of Entrepreneurial Merit
