= Marcelino Vespeira =

Portuguese painter and graphic artist

Marcelino Macedo Vespeira (Samouco, Alcochete, 9 September 1925- Lisbon, 22 February 2002) was a Portuguese painter and graphic artist. A leading figure in the surrealist movement in Portugal, Vespeira built a long and diversified work. It emerged in the mid-1940s in the context of Portuguese neo-realism, it reached a high point in the surrealist and intensely personal works made between 1948 and 1952; after that he went through abstractionism to return, in more recent decades, to the themes and forms from his surrealist period.

== Life and career ==
He took the course at the Escola de Artes Decorativas António Arroio, in Lisbon, and attended the 1st year of Architecture at the School of Fine Arts in Lisbon. After that he started working in graphic arts; he was invited by painter Bernardo Marques to collaborate in the magazine Colóquio/Artes, of which he became graphic director in 1962.

An oppositionist to the far-right New State regime, in the early period of his work he was linked to neo-realism, creating works such as Apertado pela Fome (Tightened by Hunger) (1945), with which he participated in the 1st General Exhibition of Plastic Arts of the SNBA, in 1946. Although neo-realistic in the theme, in works like this "Vespeira already shows a formal language that indicates surrealizing atmospheres". In the following year he was one of the founders of the Surrealist Group of Lisbon, together with António Pedro, Cândido Costa Pinto, Fernando de Azevedo, Mário Cesariny and José-Augusto França, among others. His work then quickly evolved into a coherent and personal language. In 1949 he participated in the group's first and only exhibition, where two collaborative works (Cadavre Exquis) were presented: in one, he worked with Fernando de Azevedo; in the other, with large dimensions, with fellow painters António Pedro, Moniz Pereira, António Domingues and Fernando de Azevedo.

Marked by an accentuated erotic character, endowed with great formal and chromatic sensuality, Vespeira's painting uses a lexicon of contrasting, round, pointed shapes, which allow him to cross metamorphoses of the female body or explicit sexual allusions with evocations of the animal world and vegetable. According to Emília Ferreira: "In a game of themes evoking ritualizing situations, we will see the emergence of the bodies of women with large round breasts, vulvas, erect phalluses, birds, flowers, horns ...", like in his famous paintings Parque dos Insultos (Park of the Insults) (1949) or Simumis (1949).

From the mid-1950s, his work changed once again. Vespeira strives for abstraction, first in a geometric style that he quickly left, then into a lyrical option closer to gestural informalism. He also started to name the tables with a simple sequential numbering. Often dominated by reds, its palette thickens; later, in the 1960s, the composition became more fluid, formally and chromatically. At the invitation of the painter Lino António, his former teacher, Vespeira taught at the António Arroio School but had to leave due to pressure from the Ministry of Education. In the following decade Vespeira re-approaches the original surrealist universe (in the 1980s he also uses collage), in works where he relapses on ancient themes and recovers "the sensual view of the world, in its familiar hybridism", crossing the contours of the landscape and the music with the lines of the female body. For a period he was the designer of the arts and letters magazine Colóquio, Revista de Artes e Letras, published by the Calouste Gulbenkian Foundation.

His long history of work in graphic arts and resistance to the Estado Novo continued after the overthrow of the dictatorship on April 25, 1974, leading him to actively collaborate with the Armed Forces Movement. Vespeira was the author of the well-known symbol of the MFA.
