= Colóquio =

Group of magazines published by the Calouste Gulbenkian Foundation (1971–)

Issue 214 of Colóquio Letras

Colóquio is the umbrella title for a series of magazines, published by the Calouste Gulbenkian Foundation in Lisbon, capital of Portugal, from January 1959. These have been dedicated to different areas of knowledge: arts, letters, sciences, education, and society. Only one of those, Colóquio Letras, is still published.

The first magazine in the series was entitled Colóquio, Revista de Artes e Letras (Magazine of Arts and Letters) and was published between January 1959 and December 1970, which was the 61st edition. The Arts part of the magazine was edited by the physician and art historian, Reynaldo dos Santos until his death in 1970, while the literary part was edited by Hernâni Cidade. The first issues were designed by the artist, Bernardo Marques with this responsibility later being passed on to Marcelino Vespeira and Fernando de Azevedo.

In February 1971, Colóquio Artes e Letras was divided into two separate publications, Colóquio Artes and Colóquio Letras. Colóquio Artes was edited by José-Augusto França, assisted by Carlos de Pontes Leça for the areas of music, ballet, theatre, and cinema, with Fernando Azevedo as artistic consultant. It was published bimonthly until August 1977, and quarterly from 1978 onwards, with 111 issues being published until December 1996, when it ceased to be published. Initially, 3500 copies of each issue were printed, with one thousand being distributed free of charge to museums, libraries, schools, etc., including those overseas. Unlike Colóquio Letras, space was given to artists from non-Portuguese speaking countries, with a particular emphasis on French contributors.

Colóquio Letras was initially directed by Hernâni Cidade (1971-75), followed by Jacinto do Prado Coelho (1971-84); David Mourão-Ferreira (1984-92); Joana Morais Varela (1996-2008); and Nuno Júdice (from 2009). Initially bimonthly, it became quarterly in 1992 and from 2009 has been published once every four months. It publishes unpublished poetry and fiction by present-day authors and writings by authors from the past with the aim of bringing about a revaluation of forgotten and little-studied authors. It is dedicated almost exclusively to Portuguese-language literature, including that from Brazil and Portuguese-speaking Africa. Two issues in 1996 were devoted to writings in the Galician language.

Other magazines in the series, which are no longer published, were Colóquio Educação e Sociedade (Education and Society), edited by João José Fraústo da Silva and Colóquio Ciências, edited by João Andrade e Silva and, later, by José Moreira Araújo. Both were first published in 1988.
