= Portugal Tem Talento =

- Logo of Portugal Tem Talento
- Genre: Reality show, talent show, entertainment
- Created by: Simon Cowell
- Presented by: Bárbara Guimarães
- Judges: José Diogo Quintela; Conceição Lino; Ricardo Pais
- Country of origin: Portugal
- No. of series: 1
- No. of episodes: 2

Production
- Producer: Sérgio Graciano
- Running time: 90 minutes

Original release
- Network: SIC
- Release: January 30, 2011

Related
- Got Talent; Aqui Há Talento

Portugal Tem Talento is the second Portuguese version of the Got Talent series, following "Aqui Há Talento", which aired on RTP1 in 2007. It debuted on SIC on January 30, 2011. Singers, dancers, comedians, variety acts, and other performers are competing for the prize of €100,000. It is hosted by Bárbara Guimarães. The judges are Diogo Quintela, Conceição Lino and Ricardo Pais.
