= Manuel Maria Carrilho =

Portuguese academic and politician (born 1951)

Ambassador of Portugal to UNESCO
- In office 12 February 2009 – 31 December 2010
- Preceded by: Duarte Ortigão
- Succeeded by: Luís Filipe Castro Mendes

Minister of Culture
- In office 28 October 1995 – 12 July 2000
- Prime Minister: António Guterres
- Preceded by: Manuel Frexes
- Succeeded by: José Sasportes

Member of the Assembly of the Republic
- In office 12 July 2000 – 12 February 2009
- Constituency: Porto (2000–2005); Viseu (2005–2009)

Member of the Lisbon City Council
- In office 9 October 2005 – 12 February 2009

Personal details
- Born: Manuel Maria Ferreira Carrilho; 9 July 1951 (age 75) Coimbra, Portugal
- Party: Socialist Party (since 1986)
- Spouse(s): Joana Morais Varela (m. 1972; div. 1984) Bárbara Guimarães (m. 2003; div. 2013)
- Children: 4
- Education: University of Lisbon; Faculty of Social and Human Sciences
- Occupation: Professor • Politician

Manuel Maria Ferreira Carrilho (born 9 July 1951) is a Portuguese university professor and politician from the Socialist Party, who has also held various political roles, such as Minister of Culture and member of the Assembly of the Republic.

== Biography ==
Manuel Maria Carrilho was born in Coimbra and lived in Viseu until the age of 18. He is the son of Manuel Augusto Engrácia Carrilho, who served as Civil Governor and Mayor of Viseu, and Maria do Céu Girão Ferreira. Carrilho has been married twice—first to Joana Morais Varela (1972-1984) and later to Bárbara Guimarães (2003-2013). He is divorced and has four children: José Maria, born in 1974 from his first marriage; Maria, born in 1985 from his relationship with Ana Cristina Alves; and Dinis Maria and Carlota Maria, born in 2004 and 2010 respectively, from his second marriage.

Carrilho's relationship with Bárbara Guimarães was tumultuous, beginning with a "false" marriage in August 2001 due to the discovery that she was still legally married. The marriage ended in a series of mutual accusations, including domestic violence, for which both were initially indicted. While Bárbara Guimarães was later cleared of charges, Carrilho was prosecuted and stood trial in Lisbon's Criminal Court from January 2016 to December 2017, where he was acquitted. Guimarães appealed the acquittal twice, but Carrilho was re-acquitted in both instances, in rulings dated March 15, 2019, and October 21, 2020. However, in March 2022, he was convicted by the Court of Appeal. Carrilho detailed the events of this legal process in his 2024 book Acuso, in which he argues that he was wrongly convicted.

== Academic career ==
Carrilho completed his secondary education in Viseu and graduated with a degree in Philosophy from the Faculty of Letters of the University of Lisbon in 1975. He earned a Ph.D. in Contemporary Philosophy from the Faculty of Social and Human Sciences of the NOVA University Lisbon in 1985, where he later became a Regent-Professor in 1994.

His research has focused primarily on the philosophy of knowledge and science, argumentation theory and rhetoric, communication, and political theory. Alongside his research and teaching, particularly in epistemology and contemporary philosophy, Carrilho has been involved with various national and international institutions and publications. He founded and directed the journals Filosofia e Epistemologia (1979-1984) and Crítica (1987-1993). He has also contributed to or directed several collective works, including História e Prática das Ciências (1979), Epistemologia – Posições e Críticas (1991), Dicionário do Pensamento Contemporâneo (1991), Retórica e Comunicação (1994), La philosophie anglo-saxonne (1994), Histoire de la rhétorique (1997), and La rhétorique (2012). Additionally, he has written prefaces for works by William James, Marcel Gauchet and Gilles Lipovetsky.

For decades, Carrilho has been a columnist for several newspapers, including Público, Expresso, and Diário de Notícias, and has served as an analyst/commentator on various television channels, including SIC, SIC Notícias, TVI, and TVI24.

== Political career ==
A member of the Socialist Party since 1986, Carrilho was appointed Minister of Culture in October 1995, a position he held until July 2000 under the 13th and 14th Constitutional Government led by António Guterres. In 2000, Carrilho resigned from the government and took his seat in the Assembly of the Republic as a deputy elected from the Porto district. Later, in 2005, he was elected as a deputy from the Viseu district. He participated in the Parliamentary Committees on Foreign Affairs and European Affairs and served as Vice-President of the Socialist Party's Parliamentary Group from 2002 to 2008. In 2005, he was the Socialist Party's candidate for the presidency of the Lisbon City Council, a race won by the Social Democratic Party (PSD). In late 2008, Carrilho was appointed Portugal's Ambassador to UNESCO, a role he held until December 31, 2010. His tenure ended after a disagreement with Prime Minister José Sócrates over the candidate to support in the UNESCO leadership race. Carrilho backed Irina Bokova, who was ultimately elected, while Sócrates favored Farouk Hosny, a candidate with a controversial record on freedom of expression under Egyptian dictator Hosni Mubarak.

== Publications ==
1. Acuso - a Parcialidade da Justiça e a Impunidade de que Goza, Edições 70, 2024
2. Razões e Paixões, Grácio Editor, 2023
3. A Democracia no Seu Momento Apocalíptico, Grácio Editor, 2022
4. Sem Retorno, Grácio Editor, 2021
5. Ser Contemporâneo do seu Tempo, Guerra e Paz, 2017
6. Pensar o que lá vem, Planeta, 2015, reprinted by Grácio Editor, 2021
7. Virtudes do perspetivismo, Grácio Editor, 2013
8. La Rhétorique (ed.), CNRS Éditions, 2012
9. Pensar o Mundo (2 vols.), Grácio Editor, 2012
10. De Olhos Bem Abertos, Sextante, 2011
11. E Agora? Por uma Nova República, Sextante, 2010
12. Sob o Signo da Verdade, Dom Quixote, 2006
13. O Impasse Português, Notícias, 2005
14. Crónicas Intempestivas, Temas e Debates, 2004
15. A Política à Conversa, Notícias, 2003
16. A Cultura no Coração da Política, Notícias, 2001
17. O Estado da Nação, Notícias, 2001 (2nd ed. 2002)
18. Hipóteses de Cultura, Lisboa, Presença, 1999
19. Histoire de la Rhétorique (co-author), Le Livre de Poche, 1998 (Portuguese translation: História da Retórica, Temas e Debates, 2002)
20. Major Trends in Argumentation Theory (ed.), Revue Int. de Philosophie, No. 2, 1966
21. Aventuras da Interpretação, Presença, 1995
22. Argumentation, Aesthetics and Rationality (ed.), Argumentation (Kluwer), No. 3/1995
23. Metamorfoses da Cultura (ed.), Fundação Gulbenkian, 1995
24. Filosofia, Difusão Cultural, 1994 (3rd ed. Quimera, 2001) (French translation: Rationalités, Hatier, 1997)
25. La Philosophie Anglo-Saxonne (co-author), PUF, 1994 (Portuguese translation: A filosofia das ciências, Presença, 1994)
26. Retórica e Comunicação (ed.), ASA, 1994
27. Rhétoriques de la Modernité, PUF, 1992 (Portuguese version: Jogos de Racionalidade, ASA, 1994)
28. Epistemologia: posições e críticas (ed.), Fundação Gulbenkian, 1991
29. Dicionário do Pensamento Contemporâneo (ed.), Dom Quixote, 1991
30. Verdade, Suspeita e Argumentação, Presença, 1990
31. Itinerários da Racionalidade, Dom Quixote, 1989
32. Elogio da Modernidade, Presença, 1989
33. Razão e Transmissão da Filosofia, IN-CM, 1987
34. O Saber e o Método, IN-CM, 1982
35. Dissidência e Nova Filosofia (ed.), Assírio e Alvim, 1979
36. História e Prática das Ciências (ed.), A Regra do Jogo, 1979

== Honors and awards ==
Throughout his career, Manuel Maria Carrilho has received numerous honors:

1. Picasso-Miró Medal, UNESCO (1998)
2. European Archaeological Heritage Prize, European Association of Archaeologists (1999)
3. Grand Cross of the Order of Civil Merit, awarded by King Juan Carlos of Spain (1996)
4. Grand Cross of the Order of Rio Branco, awarded by the President of the Federative Republic of Brazil Fernando Henrique Cardoso (1999)
5. Légion d’Honneur, awarded by President Jacques Chirac, at the level of “Grand Officier,” the highest level typically awarded to foreign citizens who are not heads of state.

== Political Positions ==
1. Minister of Culture in the 13th and 14th Constitutional Governments (1995-2000)
2. Member of the Assembly of the Republic (2000-2008)
3. Ambassador of Portugal to UNESCO (2008-2010)
