= Alberto Costa (Portuguese politician) =

Portuguese politician (born 1947)

Minister of Justice
- In office 12 March 2005 – 26 October 2009
- Prime Minister: José Sócrates
- Preceded by: José Pedro Aguiar-Branco
- Succeeded by: Alberto Martins

Minister of Internal Administration
- In office 28 October 1995 – 25 November 1997
- Preceded by: Manuel Dias Loureiro
- Succeeded by: Jorge Coelho

Personal details
- Born: 1947 (age 78–79) Alcobaça, Portugal
- Party: Socialist

Alberto Bernardes Costa (born in Alcobaça, 1947) was the Portuguese Minister of Justice (Ministro da Justiça) from 12 March 2005 to 26 October 2009.

Preceded by Manuel Dias Loureiro	Minister of Internal Administration; 28 October 1995 – 25 November 1997	Succeeded by Jorge Coelho
Preceded by José Pedro Aguiar-Branco	Minister of Justice; 12 March 2005;end 26-10-2009–present	Incumbent
