= Manuel Soares Costa =

Portuguese politician (1933–2021)

Manuel José Dias Soares Costa (19 March 1933 – 2 September 2021) was a Portuguese politician who served as Minister of Agriculture from 1983 to 1984. He was born in Lisbon.
