= Jaime Silva (Portugal) =

Portuguese politician (born 1954)

Jaime Silva (born Almeida, Almeida, Guarda, 21 February 1954) was a Minister of Agriculture, Rural Development and Fisheries of Portugal in the XVII Governo Constitucional administration team headed by Prime Minister José Sócrates. He was first appointed to the ministry in March 2005 and continued in this position until 2009 legislative elections.
