= Joaquim Pina Moura =

Portuguese politician (1952–2020)

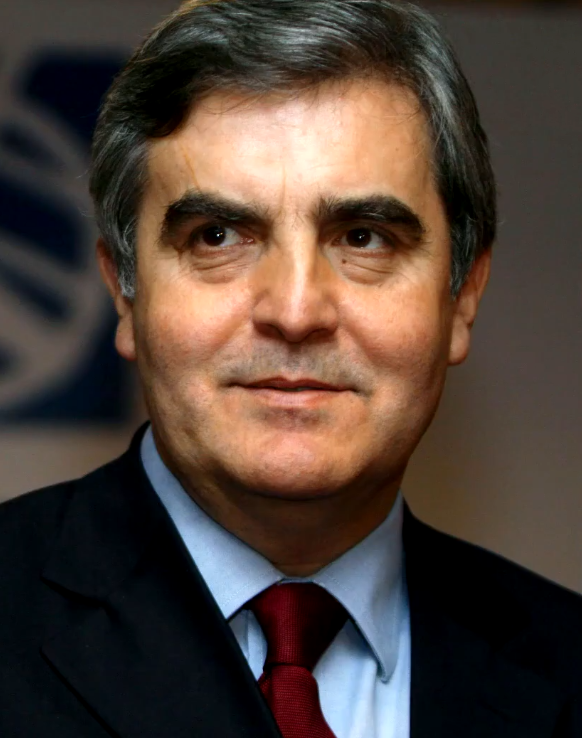
- Born: 22 February 1952; Loriga, Portugal
- Died: 20 February 2020 (aged 67); Lisbon, Portugal
- Occupations: Economist; Politician

Joaquim Pina Moura (22 February 1952 – 20 February 2020) was a Portuguese politician and economist. He was a member of the Socialist Party.

== Biography ==
Moura attended the University of Porto, where he took courses in mechanical engineering. He held a bachelor's degree in economics and a doctorate in monetary and financial economics. He was a member of the European Bank for Reconstruction and Development.

Moura joined the Portuguese Communist Party in 1972, and joined the Opposition Congress the following year, as part of the Portuguese Democratic Movement against the Estado Novo regime. In 1995, Moura joined the Socialist Party. He was appointed Deputy Secretary of State to Prime Minister António Guterres that same year. He was promoted to Minister of Economy in 1997. He served as a Deputy on the Assembly of the Republic from 1995 until his resignation in 2007.

Joaquim Pina Moura died on 20 February 2020 at the age of 67.
