= Luís Capoulas Santos =

Portuguese politician (born 1951)

His Excellency Luís Capoulas Santos GCMA
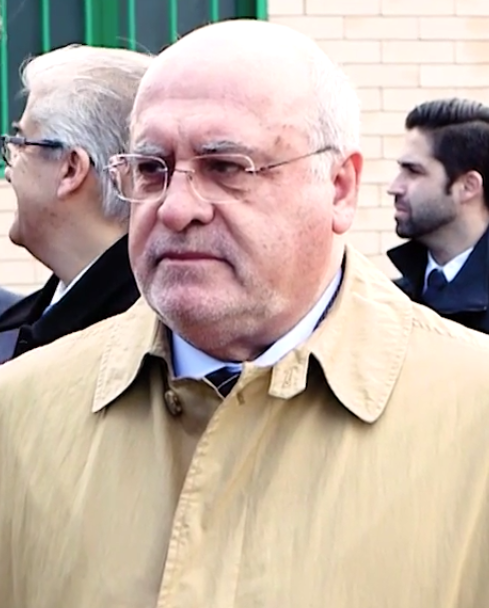

Minister of Agriculture, Forests and Rural Development
- In office 26 November 2015 – 26 October 2019
- Prime Minister: António Costa
- Preceded by: Assunção Cristas
- Succeeded by: Maria do Céu Antunes
- In office 3 October 1998 – 6 April 2002
- Prime Minister: António Guterres
- Preceded by: Fernando Gomes da Silva
- Succeeded by: Armando Sevinate Pinto

Member of the European Parliament
- In office 20 July 2004 – 30 June 2014
- Constituency: Portugal

Member of the Assembly of the Republic
- In office 23 October 2015 – 25 March 2024
- Constituency: Évora
- In office 10 April 2002 – 19 July 2004
- Constituency: Évora
- In office 6 October 1991 – 24 October 1999
- Constituency: Évora

Member of the Montemor-o-Novo City Council
- In office 12 December 1976 – 16 December 1979

Personal details
- Born: Luís Manuel Capoulas Santos; 22 August 1951 (age 75) Montemor-o-Novo, Portugal
- Party: Socialist Party (1976–present)
- Children: 2
- Education: University of Évora

Luís Manuel Capoulas Santos (born 22 August 1951) is a Portuguese politician, who served as Minister of Agriculture, Forests and Rural Development.

== Life before politics ==
Capoulas Santos was born in Montemor-o-Novo. He is a licenciate in Sociology from the University of Évora. He worked as a secondary education teacher before taking a position as a technician in the Ministry of Agriculture.

== Political activity ==
His political career started in 1976, after being elected as a member of the City Council in his home city of Montemor-o-Novo.

He was first elected to the Assembly of the Republic in 1991, and took office as Minister of Agriculture, Rural Development and Fisheries in 1998, replacing Fernando Gomes da Silva, under whom he was Secretary of State. He kept the office until 2002, when the government led by António Guterres resigned after a landslide defeat in local elections.

Capoulas Santos was elected Member of the European Parliament for the Socialist Party; part of the Party of European Socialists, between 2004 and 2014.

He returned to the Ministry of Agriculture in 2015, after the nomination of António Costa as Prime Minister.

== Honours ==
- Grand Cross of the Order of Entrepreneurial Merit, Category of Agricultural Merit (17/01/2006).
