= Dulce Pássaro =

Portuguese environmental specialist and politician

Minister of Environment and Spatial Planning
- In office October 2009 – June 2011
- Parliamentary group: Independent

President of the Oliveira do Hospital municipal council
- Incumbent
- Assumed office October 2017

Personal details
- Born: 23 November 1953 (age 72) Oliveira do Hospital, Portugal
- Party: Portuguese: Socialist Party (PS)
- Education: Instituto Superior Técnico
- Occupation: Waste-management specialist

Dulce Pássaro (born 1953) is a Portuguese engineer and politician. She was Minister of Environment and Spatial Planning in Portugal between October 2009 and June 2011.

== Education ==
Dulce dos Prazeres Fidalgo Álvaro Pássaro was born in the municipality of Oliveira do Hospital in Coimbra district on 23 November 1953. She graduated in chemical engineering at the Instituto Superior Técnico, and then studied sanitary engineering at NOVA University Lisbon.

== Career ==
Pássaro began her career as an assistant professor at a Polytechnic college. In 1977 she was admitted as a senior officer of the Portuguese civil service, being appointed as head of the waste division of the General Directorate for Environmental Quality, and subsequently as the director of the waste and recycling service. Later she was the director of the planning and international affairs department of the Waste Institute, before being appointed as the president of the same Institute. She worked on legislation to combat maritime pollution, and participated in the drafting of the first national water quality law, the national waste plan, and strategic plans for industrial and hospital waste management. She also prepared the waste legislation for Macau, at the time a Portuguese territory. Pássaro was also a member of several Commission of the European Union committees.

From March 2003 to October 2009, Pássaro was a member of the board of directors of the Instituto Regulador de Aguas e Residuos (Regulatory Institute of Water and Waste). A supporter of the Portuguese Socialist Party (PS), she was appointed Minister of Environment and Spatial Planning of the XVIII Constitutional Government in October 2009. This was considered a surprise by the press. She held the position until June 2011 when the PS needed to form a coalition after the elections and her position was given to a coalition partner. In October 2017 she headed the Socialist Party list for the municipal assembly of Oliveira do Hospital, with her party winning 15 of the 21 seats, resulting in her becoming president of the council.
