= 2026 Portuguese general strike =

One-day labor strike in Portugal

- Date: 3 June 2026
- Location: Nationwide
- Caused by: Proposed labour reform package
- Goals: Demonstrate worker and societal opposition
- Methods: Strike action, protesting
- Result: 5.1% total economic contraction; 38–45% of schools close; 44.7–49% flight cancellation; 75% of surgeries and 28% of medical appointments cancelled; Long-distance train travel suspended

Parties
| General Confederation of Portuguese Workers (Note: Included in the striking labor unions were the Union of Aviation and Airport Workers (SITAVA), Union of Civil Aviation Flight Personnel (SNPVAC), Federação Nacional dos Professores (FENPROF), National Higher Education Union (SNESup), National Federation of Unions of Workers in Public and Social Functions (FNSTFPS), National Union of Local and Regional Administration Workers (STAL), Federation of Transport and Communications Unions (FECTRANS), Portuguese Nurses' Union (SEP), National Federation of Doctors (FNAM), Federation of Agriculture, Food, Beverages, Hospitality and Tourism Unions of Portugal (FESAHT), Intersindical Federation of Metallurgical, Chemical, Electrical, Pharmaceutical, Pulp, Paper, Graphic, Press, Energy and Mining Industries (FIEQUIMETAL), Union of Commerce, Office and Services Workers of Portugal (CESP), and National Union of Insurance and Related Professionals (SINAPSA).) | XXV Constitutional Government of Portugal |

Lead figures
| Tiago Oliveira | Luís Montenegro |

Casualties
- Arrested: 6

The 2026 Portuguese general strike (Portuguese: Greve geral de 3 de junho) occurred on 3 June against proposed labour reforms by the Democratic Alliance government. Organized by the General Confederation of the Portuguese Workers (CGTP), it followed the 11 December 2025 Portuguese general strike. Unlike the previous one, the General Union of Workers (UGT) refrained from joining. Major disruption was seen in public sector air flight, metros, schools, and hospitals. Private sector participation is disputed by the CGTP and government. The reform package protested was rejected by the Portuguese parliament on 19 June 2026.

== Background ==
In September 2025, the Democratic Alliance (AD) government proposed the "Trabalho XXI" labour reform package that would have affected 100 articles of the labour code. Outlined were the deregulation of working hours, easier dismissal, reduction in strike rights, lower parental protections, and permission to outsource a year after layoffs. The measures were promoted by the AD in the name of productivity and growth. Labour Minister Maria do Rosário Palma Ramalho asserted Portugal had the second-most rigid labour laws within the OECD, crediting this for economic shortfalls.

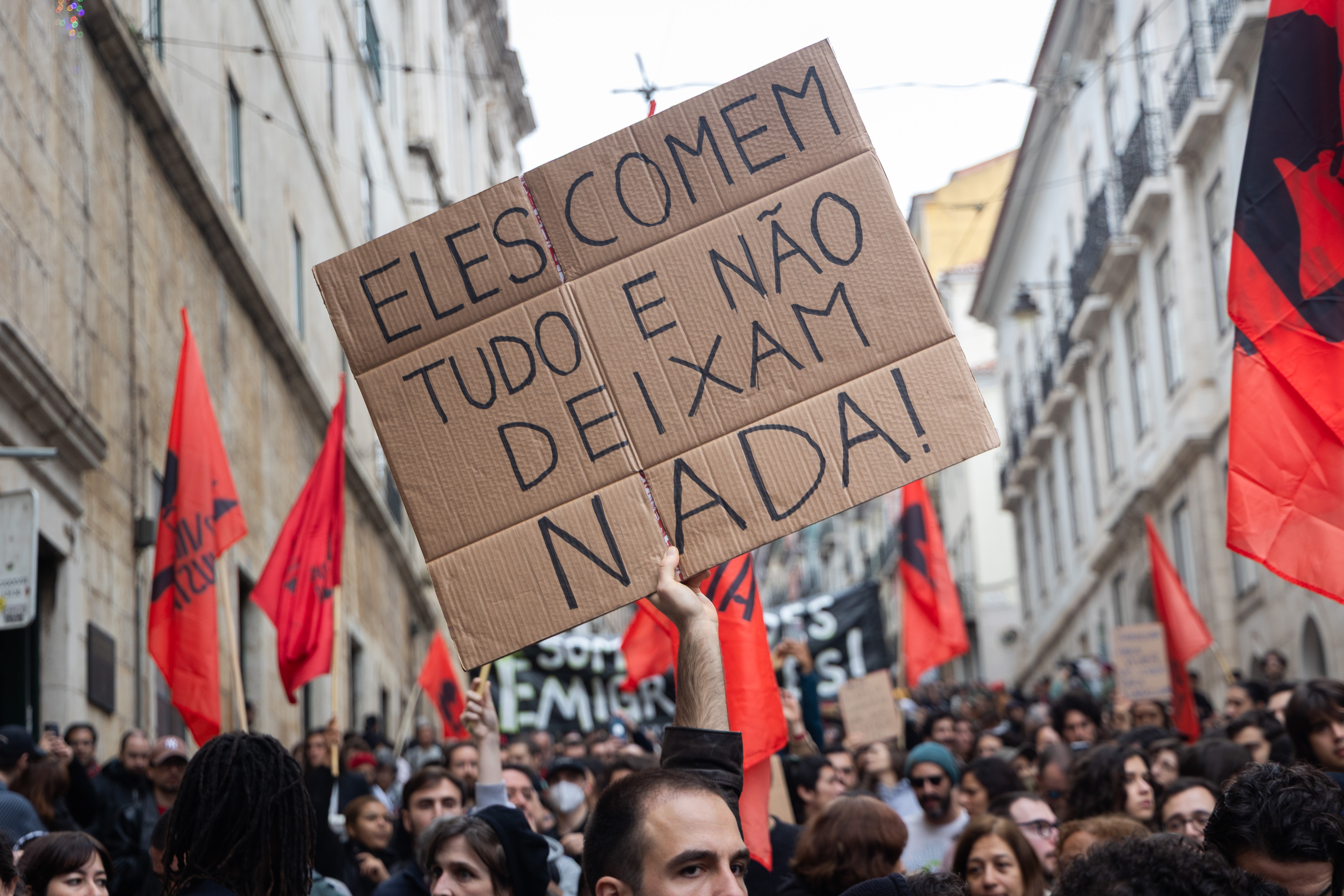
Sign held during the 11 December 2025 general strike reads: "They eat everything and leave nothing!"

The General Confederation of the Portuguese Workers (CGTP) and General Union of Workers (UGT) condemned the measures, stating they would severely worsen working conditions. CGTP general secretary Tiago Oliveira claimed young workers faced "precarious contracts for life" and a 50-hour work week instead of 40. Accordingly, they organized the 11 December 2025 Portuguese general strike. It was the first general strike and collaborative action by the unions since 2013, affecting the public sector and transportation.

On 1 May 2026, the CGTP called for another 24-hour general strike set for 3 June. However, the UGT opted to continue negotiations that had begun in November. After mandatory social dialogue broke down the week before, the government proceeded with the proposal on 18 May 2026. Both unions accused the government of privileging corporations. Prime Minister Luís Montenegro defended the package by expressing the need for workers' rights and laws that permitted annual economic growth to rise from 1.5–2% to 3.5–4%. Leader of the Opposition and far-right party Chega President André Ventura stated his willingness to negotiate but demanded lowering the retirement age from 66 years and 9 months to 65 years as well as 3 days of annual leave. The Socialist Party unequivocally opposed the reforms. Over 50 amendments to the bill originally presented on 24 July 2025 were considered, 12 of which were forwarded by the UGT. Among those approved were the removal of the outsourcing provision and higher minimum compensation for illegal dismissals.

== Impact ==
Unlike the first general strike, the UGT did not join. According to data published by the Bank of Portugal, the day experienced a 5.1% national economic contraction, comparable to the 6.3% of the first strike. Within the past year they were topped only by an international blackout suffered in Iberia on 28 April 2025, which resulted in a 14.5% contraction. Observador further noted electrical consumption dropped 2% compared to the previous day. Although the government claims the general strike was confined to the public sector (which it estimated to have 23% participation), the CGTP claims significant participation by workers of certain construction, ceramics, cement, and glass industrial companies. The Confederation of Portuguese Business (CIP) estimated 2–3% participation at electrical, electronic, and agro-industrial facilities with the most strikers, claiming a majority of industries (Note: Specifically mentioned were chemicals, metalworking, textiles, footwear, wood and furniture, printing and paper processing, automotive, cement, large-scale retail, pharmacies, pharmaceuticals, private healthcare, and insurance.) bypassed the strike.

The CGTP claimed 100% participation by union workers at Lisbon Metro, Transdev Viseu, Urban Transport Company of Guarda, and the transport company in Covilhã. Carris stood at 98% and Transtejo & Soflusa 85%. Comboios de Portugal suspended long-distance train travel and most regional railroads. It operated 266 of 1,069 trips, only two more than what is considered minimum services. Lisbon Metro completely shut down. There was a 44.7% to 49% reduction in air flights due to cancellations. The most affected mainland location was Lisbon Airport, which had 62% of flights cancelled. Porto and Faro individually experienced 33% reductions. Travel between the mainland and Portuguese autonomous regions was severely incapacitated. The majority of flights in the Azores were cancelled: Flores Airport (100%), Horta (67%), Ponta Delgada (62%), and Santa Maria (50%). Business associations attributed work absences to transportation issues, with the Tourism Confederation of Portugal claiming normal operations and the hotel and restaurant association claiming 6% establishment closure.

According to Education Minister Fernando Alexandre, 38–45% of schools were closed; 76% of teachers and 59% of non-teacher staff participated in the strike. 52% of students were unable to take the standardized ModA exam. Oliveira and Euronews reported public hospitals were operating with minimal services. National Health Service night shift workers brought a "near total shutdown". Emergency services operated at minimum requirements. 1,054 (66%) of scheduled surgeries, 28,776 (34%) of planned appointments, and 21,079 (50%) of medical tests/clinical analyses were not performed. The São João Hospital main operating suite completely shut down. Only 3 social security offices were reported closed, with 11.5% of workers participating.

In Lisbon, the day culminated in a march on São Bento Palace, where the Assembly of the Republic was convened to discuss revisions and prepare the bill for 18 June voting. Six people were arrested by the Polícia de Segurança Pública (PSP) as it broke up the crowd blocking traffic. According to the PSP, orders to vacate the area were ignored and some physically reacted to police. Montenegro condemned the unrest as exceeding the right to strike and Oliveira attributed it to non-union "infiltrators". Nonetheless, Paulo Raimundo, general secretary of the Portuguese Communist Party, praised the strike and protest as "a clear rejection of the social regression and increased exploitation they [AD] seek to impose on workers".

Chega's negotiations with the Social Democratic Party failed, and the Assembly voted 130-100 against the bill on 19 June. Chega and the Socialist Party overtook the Democratic Alliance in subsequent popularity polling. Montenegro claimed the nation's "extremes of the political spectrum" blocked the bill and vowed to continue pursuing labour reforms. Whilst the CGTP credits both general strikes and asserts itself as center to the struggle against Trabalho XXI, the UGT references the 2025 strike and amendments as factors in the "victory for the labour movement".

== See also ==
- 2023 Portuguese public sector strikes
- Anti-austerity movement in Portugal
- Portuguese general strike of 1934
