= Council of Ministers (Portugal) =

Executive body of the Government of Portugal

Portuguese Ministerial Standard.

The Council of Ministers (Portuguese: Conselho de Ministros, pronounced [kõˈseʎu ðɨ miˈniʃtɾuʃ]) is a collegial executive body within the Government of Portugal. It is presided over by the Prime Minister, but the President of Portugal can take on this role at the Prime Minister's request. All senior ministers are members of the Council of Ministers, and when the prime minister finds it applicable, state secretaries can also attend its meetings.

== Functions ==
The Council of Ministers discusses and approves bills to be submitted to the Assembly of the Republic and decrees and resolutions.

== Current Council of Ministers ==
As of 5 June 2025, the Council of Ministers consisted of the following:

Party key	Social Democratic Party
Party key	CDS – People's Party
Party key	Independent

Ministry	Incumbent	Term
Prime Minister	Luís Montenegro	5 June 2025 – Incumbent
Foreign Affairs	Paulo Rangel	5 June 2025 – Incumbent
Finance	Joaquim Miranda Sarmento	5 June 2025 – Incumbent
Presidency	António Leitão Amaro	5 June 2025 – Incumbent
Economy and Territorial Cohesion	Manuel Castro Almeida	5 June 2025 – Incumbent
State Reform	Gonçalo Saraiva Matias	5 June 2025 – Incumbent
Parliamentary Affairs	Carlos Abreu Amorim	5 June 2025 – Incumbent
National Defence	Nuno Melo	5 June 2025 – Incumbent
Infrastructure and Housing	Miguel Pinto Luz	5 June 2025 – Incumbent
Justice	Rita Júdice	5 June 2025 – Incumbent
Internal Administration	Luís Neves	23 February 2026 – Incumbent
Education, Science and Innovation	Fernando Alexandre	5 June 2025 – Incumbent
Health	Ana Paula Martins	5 June 2025 – Incumbent
Labour, Solidarity, and Social Security	Maria do Rosário Palma Ramalho	5 June 2025 – Incumbent
Environment and Energy	Graça Carvalho	2 April 2024 – Incumbent
Culture, Youth and Sports	Margarida Balseiro Lopes	5 June 2025 – Incumbent
Agriculture and Sea	José Manuel Fernandes	5 June 2025 – Incumbent

The Secretary of State for the Presidency of the Council of Ministers (Tiago Meneses Moutinho Macierinha) also attends the meetings of the Council of Ministers, but without voting rights.

== Presidency of the Council of Ministers ==
The Presidency of the Council of Ministers is the central department of the Government of Portugal whose mission is to provide support to the Council of Ministers, the Prime Minister and the other members of the Government organically integrated there and promote inter-ministerial coordination of the various government departments.

In accordance with the Organic Law of the XXV Constitutional Government, the Presidency of the Council of Ministers comprises the following members of the Government:

- Minister of the Presidency
  - Secretary of State Adjunct for the Presidency and Immigration
  - Secretary of State for the Presidency of the Council of Ministers
  - Secretary of State for the Presidency
- Minister Adjunct and for State Reform
  - Secretary of State for Digitalization
  - Secretary of State for Government Simplification
- Minister of Parliamentary Affairs
- Minister of Infrastructure and Housing
  - Secretary of State for Infrastructure
  - Secretary of State for Mobility
  - Secretary of State for Housing

The Presidency of the Council of Ministers also provides support to the dependent services of the Prime Minister, as well as those of the Minister of the Presidency, Minister Adjunct and for State Reform, Minister of Parliamentary Affairs, Minister of Infrastructure and Housing, and the Minister of Culture, Youth and Sports.

== See also ==
- Cabinet (government)
- Politics of Portugal
