= Timeline of strikes in 2026 =

Strikes in 2026

In 2026, a number of labour strikes, labour disputes, and other industrial actions have occurred.

== Background ==
A labour strike is a work stoppage caused by the mass refusal of employees to work. This can include wildcat strikes, which are done without union authorisation, and slowdown strikes, where workers reduce their productivity while still carrying out minimal working duties. It is usually a response to employee grievances, such as low pay or poor working conditions. Strikes can also occur to demonstrate solidarity with workers in other workplaces or pressure governments to change policies.

== Timeline ==
=== Continuing strikes from 2025 ===
- 2025–2026 Birmingham bin strike, strike by refuse workers in Birmingham, England, over proposed pay cuts and elimination of Waste Recycling and Collection Officer roles.
- 2025–2026 Gabon teachers strike, weeks-long strike by teachers in Gabon, represented by the Syndicat de l’éducation nationale, sparked by a 10-year freeze on wages and complaints over working conditions.
- 2025–2026 Iranian protests, protests against the Iranian regime sparked by the Iranian economic crisis, including strikes.

=== January ===
- 2026 Minnesota general strike, one-day general strike in protest over the American government's Operation Metro Surge.
- 2026 Moroccan lawyers strike, five-week strike by lawyers in Morocco over a proposed law that they believed threatened the independence of the legal profession.
- 2026 New York City nurses strike

=== February ===
- 2026 San Francisco teachers strike, the first strike by teachers in San Francisco, United States, in almost 50 years.
- 2026 Writers Guild Staff Union Strike.

=== April ===
- Little Lake City School District teachers' strike. 2-week strike by teachers of the Little Lake City School District, United States, over healthcare benefits, classroom sizes, and special education support.
- 2026 Norwegian hotel and restaurant strike, ongoing strike by hotel and restaurant workers (Fellesforbundet) against NHO Reiseliv over pay and sick pay, started 19 April 2026.

=== May ===
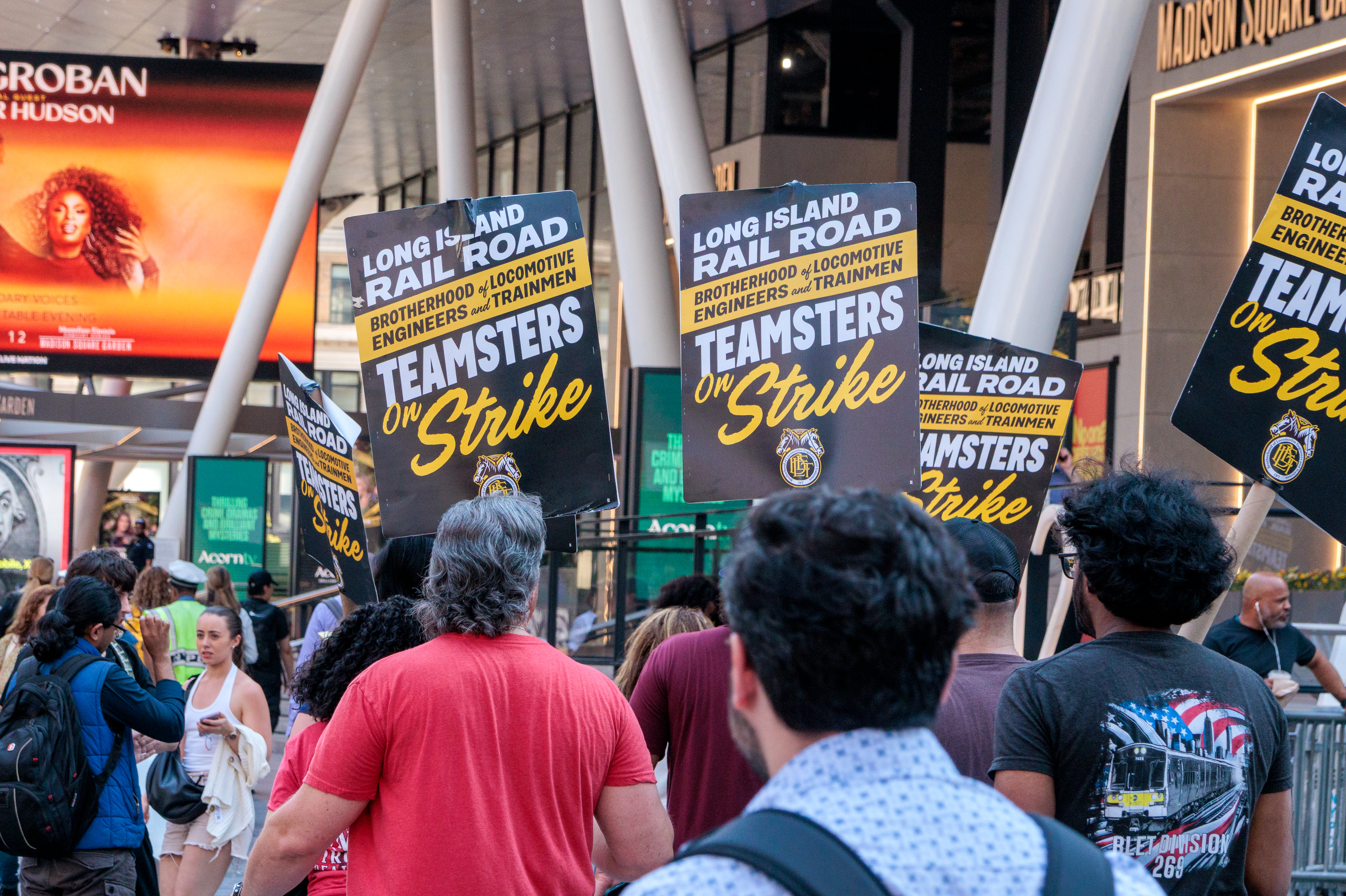
Union picket line members at Penn Station in May 2026

- 2026 Long Island Rail Road strike, on May 16, 2026, LIRR workers went on strike for the first time in three decades, shutting down the entire system. The strike followed several years of discussions with the MTA and a vote to strike on September 15, 2025 that required a 6-month negotiation period and 60-day cooldown period beforehand. Workers were asking for a 5% pay increase in 2026. The strike completely suspended service across the LIRR, with over 300,000 daily commuters being affected. With the absence of service, the MTA added shuttle buses from Howard Beach–JFK Airport station and Jamaica–179th Street station to 6 stations on Long Island, including Bay Shore, Lakeview, Hicksville, Huntington, Mineola, and Ronkonkoma. Shuttle buses were not enough to accommodate for the shutdown. A contingency transportation plan to take essential workers to and from LIRR stations via bus routes was implemented, though services were limited during the weekend as only the Nassau Inter-County Express services were operating. Commutes and transportation to and from New York City from Long Island took over an hour longer than expected due to the strike. The strike ended after three days, with the MTA giving workers a 4.5% raise and extending their contract by 6 weeks.
- 2026 Kenya transport strikes.

=== June ===
- 2026 Portuguese general strike: On June 3, the General Confederation of the Portuguese Workers (CGTP) organized against proposed labour reforms by the Democratic Alliance government. It followed the 11 December 2025 Portuguese general strike. Unlike the previous one, the General Union of Workers (UGT) refrained from joining. Major disruption was seen in public sector air flight, metros, schools, and hospitals. Private sector participation is disputed by the CGPT and government. The reform package protested was rejected by the Portuguese parliament on June 19, 2026.

=== September ===
- 2026 Victoria and Albert Museum strikes: On 4 and 5 September, workers at the V&A East Museum and Storehouse and the Young V&A go on strike over pay and working conditions, causing both sites to close. Around 700 members of Prospect and the PCS, more than half of the V&A's workforce, were involved in the strike.
- 2026 Estonian education workers' strike: On September 22, 2026, around 15,000 education workers (including teachers) in Estonia held a one-hour strike over salary negotiations.
- 2026 Victoria and Albert Museum strikes: On 25 and 26 September, workers at the V&A's main South Kensington site go on strike over pay and working conditions. The V&A said that most of the museum would be closed, with only "a limited number of galleries" remaining open.

=== October ===
- 2026 Irish public sector strikes: On 14 October, public sector trade unions in Ireland conducted a 24 hour strike, alongside other industrial actions during the month of October, in response to failed negotiations with the Government of Ireland to renew the public sector pay agreement.

=== November ===
- On 20 November, TSSA members at Transport for London went out on a 24 hour strike after the alleged unfair dismissal of a colleague and improper conduct by TfL's Fraud Unit. The Piccadilly line and some services on the District line were suspended for the duration of the strike.
