= XXV Constitutional Government of Portugal =

Current government of Portugal

25th Constitutional Government of Portugal XXV Governo Constitucional de Portugal
- Cabinet of Portugal

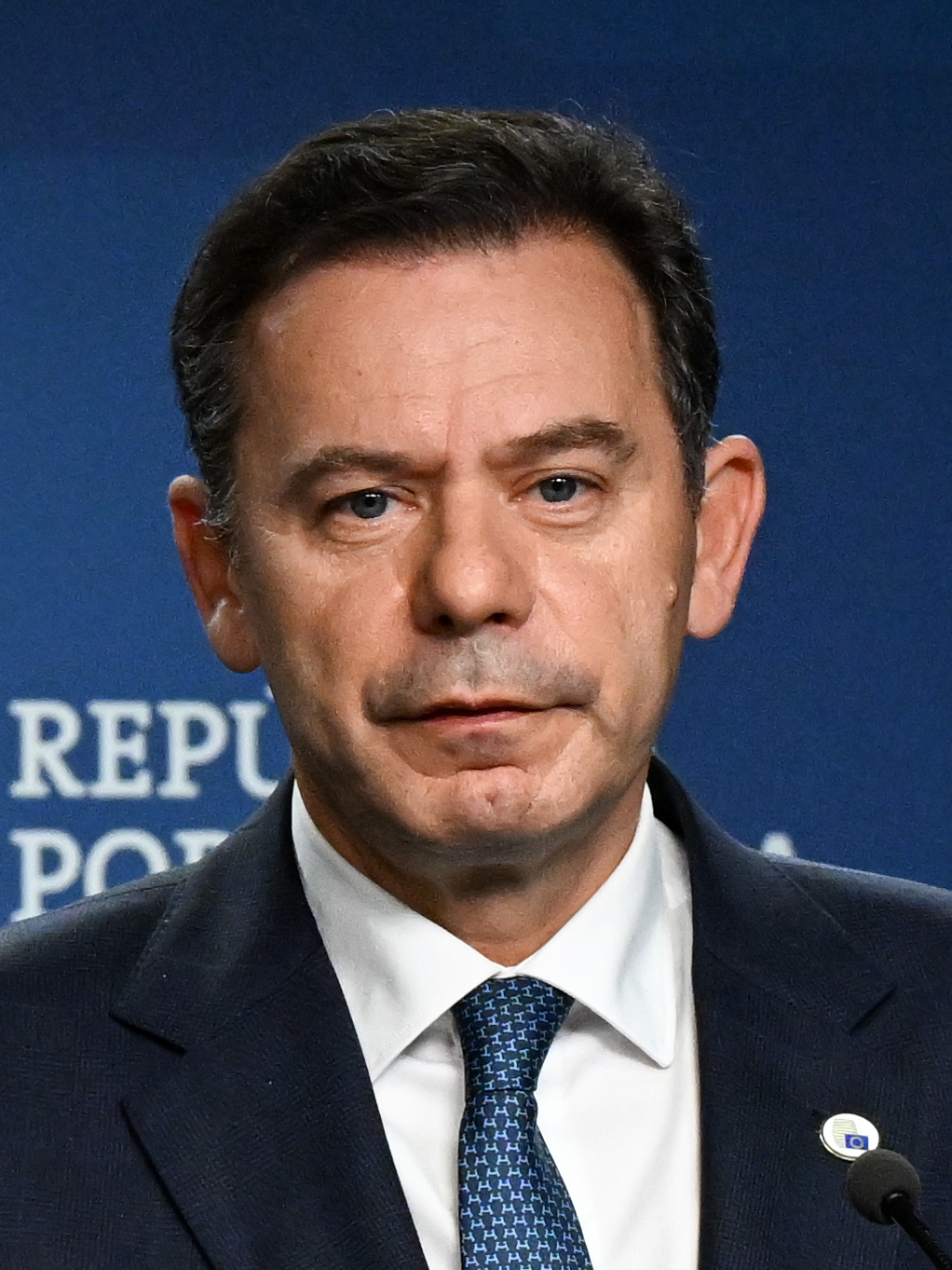
- Prime Minister Luís Montenegro
- Date formed: 5 June 2025

People and organisations
- President: Marcelo Rebelo de Sousa; António José Seguro
- Prime Minister: Luís Montenegro
- No. of ministers: 16 (Note: Not including the Prime Minister.)
- Member parties: Social Democratic Party (PSD); CDS – People's Party (CDS–PP)
- Status in legislature: Minority coalition government
- Opposition cabinet: Shadow Cabinet of André Ventura
- Opposition parties: Chega (CH); Socialist Party (PS); Liberal Initiative (IL); LIVRE (L); Portuguese Communist Party (PCP); Left Bloc (BE); People Animals Nature (PAN); Together for the People (JPP)
- Opposition leader: André Ventura (CH)

History
- Election: 2025 Portuguese legislative election
- Legislature term: 17th Legislature
- Predecessor: 24th Constitutional Government

The 25th Constitutional Government of Portugal (Portuguese: XXV Governo Constitucional de Portugal) is the current cabinet of the Portuguese government, led by Prime Minister Luís Montenegro. It was sworn in on 5 June 2025.

== Party breakdown ==
Party breakdown of cabinet ministers: (Prime Minister not included)

- Social Democratic Party
11
- CDS – People's Party
1
- Independents
4

== Composition ==
The government is composed of 16 ministries.

Office	Minister	Party	Start of term	End of term
Prime Minister	Luís Montenegro	PSD	5 June 2025	Incumbent
Minister of State and of Foreign Affairs	Paulo Rangel	PSD	5 June 2025	Incumbent
Minister of State and of Finance	Joaquim Miranda Sarmento	PSD	5 June 2025	Incumbent
Minister of the Presidency	António Leitão Amaro	PSD	5 June 2025	Incumbent
Minister of Economy and Territorial Cohesion	Manuel Castro Almeida	PSD	5 June 2025	Incumbent
Minister Adjunct and for State Reform	Gonçalo Saraiva Matias	PSD	5 June 2025	Incumbent
Minister of Parliamentary Affairs	Carlos Abreu Amorim	PSD	5 June 2025	Incumbent
Minister of National Defence	Nuno Melo	CDS–PP	5 June 2025	Incumbent
Minister of Infrastructure and Housing	Miguel Pinto Luz	PSD	5 June 2025	Incumbent
Minister of Justice	Rita Júdice	Independent	5 June 2025	Incumbent
Minister of Internal Administration	Maria Lúcia Amaral	Independent	5 June 2025	10 February 2026
Minister of Internal Administration	Prime Minister Luís Montenegro served as interim minister between 10 and 23 February 2026.			
Minister of Internal Administration	Luís Neves	Independent	23 February 2026	Incumbent
Minister of Education, Science and Innovation	Fernando Alexandre	Independent	5 June 2025	Incumbent
Minister of Health	Ana Paula Martins	PSD	5 June 2025	Incumbent
Minister of Labour, Solidarity and Social Security	Maria do Rosário Palma Ramalho	Independent	5 June 2025	Incumbent
Minister of the Environment and Energy	Maria da Graça Carvalho	PSD	5 June 2025	Incumbent
Minister of Culture, Youth and Sports	Margarida Balseiro Lopes	PSD	5 June 2025	Incumbent
Minister of Agriculture and Sea	José Manuel Fernandes	PSD	5 June 2025	Incumbent

== Opposition ==
The Portuguese Communist Party (PCP) introduced a motion to reject the new government’s program, but it was defeated in Parliament. Only PCP, BE, and Livre supported the communist motion, while all major parties, including PSD, PS, Chega, IL, and CDS, voted against.

Prime Minister Luís Montenegro stated the government is now “legitimized” and ready to focus on solving people’s problems and boosting the economy.

=== Shadow Cabinet of André Ventura ===
Two days after the 2025 legislative elections, André Ventura, leader of Chega, now the second largest party in Parliament, announced his intention to form a shadow cabinet. On 19 September 2025, Ventura finally announced the names of the Shadow Cabinet, which met for the first time on 15 October 2025.

Office	Shadow Minister	Appointment
Leader of the Opposition	André Ventura	3 June 2025
Foreign Affairs	Tiago Moreira de Sá	19 September 2025
Finance and Economy	Rui Teixeira Santos	19 September 2025
State Reform	Miguel Corte-Real	19 September 2025
National Defence	Nuno Simões de Melo	19 September 2025
Infrastructure and Housing	Margarida Bentes Penedo	19 September 2025
Justice	Rui Gomes da Silva	19 September 2025
Home Affairs	Fernando José Silva	19 September 2025
Education	Alexandre Franco de Sá	19 September 2025
Health	Horácio Costa	19 September 2025
Culture	Teresa Nogueira Pinto	19 September 2025
Agriculture	Jorge Cid	19 September 2025
