= XX Constitutional Government of Portugal =

Cabinet of Portugal in 2015, led by Pedro Passos Coelho

XX Constitutional Government of Portugal XX Governo Constitucional de Portugal
- Cabinet of Portugal

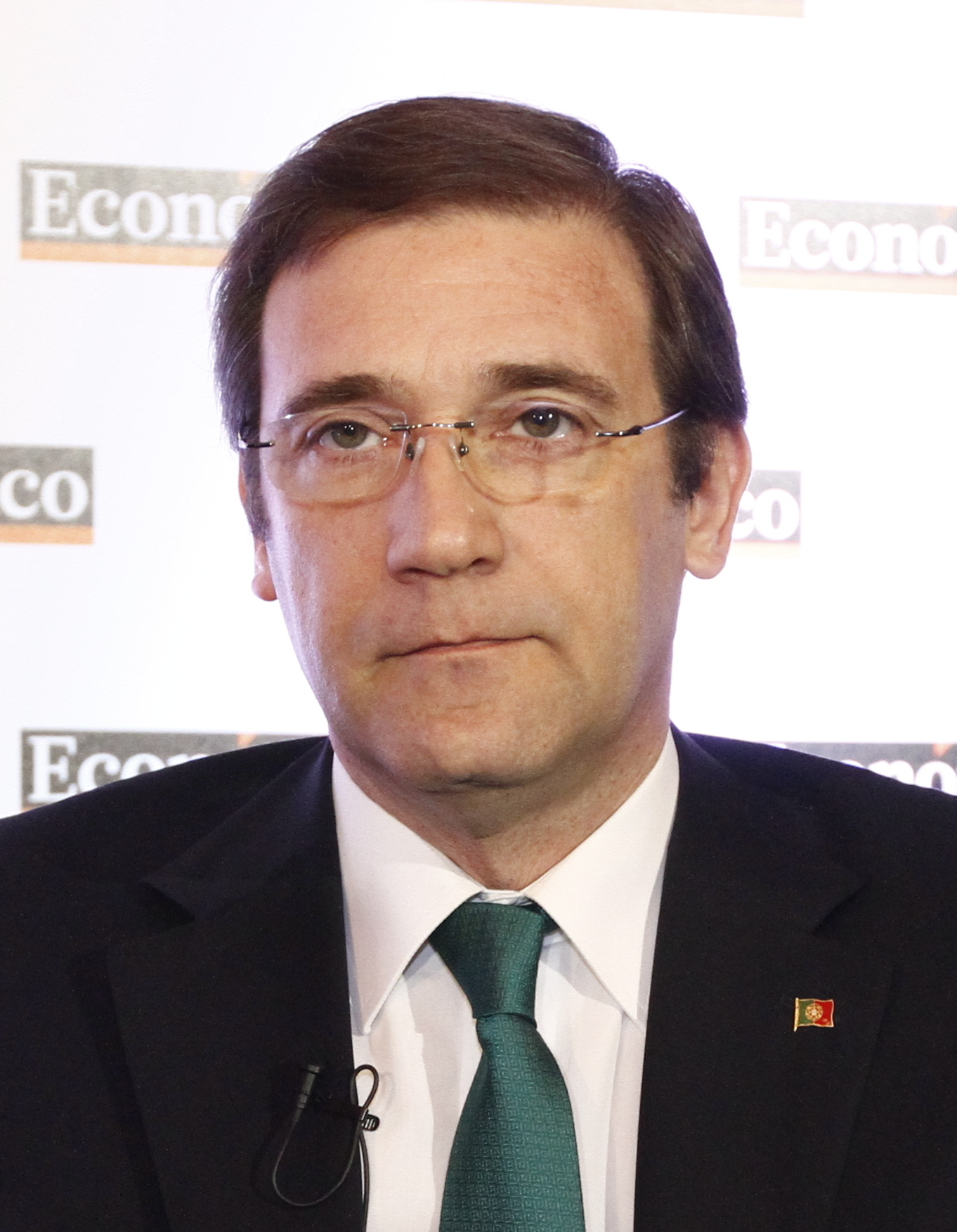
- Prime Minister Pedro Passos Coelho
- Date formed: 30 October 2015
- Date dissolved: 26 November 2015 (27 days)

People and organisations
- President: Aníbal Cavaco Silva
- Prime Minister: Pedro Passos Coelho (PSD)
- Deputy Prime Minister: Paulo Portas (CDS–PP)
- No. of ministers: 15 (Note: Not including the Prime Minister and his deputy.)
- Member parties: Social Democratic Party; CDS – People's Party
- Status in legislature: Minority coalition government
- Opposition parties: Socialist Party (PS); Left Bloc (BE); Portuguese Communist Party (PCP); Ecologist Party "The Greens" (PEV); People–Animals–Nature (PAN)

History
- Elections: 2015 Portuguese legislative election (4 October 2015)
- Predecessor: XIX Constitutional Government of Portugal
- Successor: XXI Constitutional Government of Portugal

The XX Constitutional Government of Portugal (Portuguese: XX Governo Constitucional de Portugal) was the 20th government of the Third Portuguese Republic, under the current Constitution. It was in office between 30 October 2015 and 26 November 2015, and was formed by a centre-right coalition between the Social Democratic Party (PSD) and the CDS – People's Party (CDS–PP), which ran together in the 2015 legislative election under the name Portugal Ahead. Pedro Passos Coelho, leader of the PSD, served as Prime Minister.

Lasting only 27 days, it was the shortest-lived Portuguese national government since the Carnation Revolution.

== Party breakdown ==
Party breakdown of cabinet ministers by the end of the government's time in office: (Prime Minister not included)

- Social Democratic Party
9
- CDS – People's Party
4
- Independents
3

== Composition ==
The government was composed of the Prime Minister, the Deputy Prime Minister, and 15 ministries comprising ministers, secretaries and sub-secretaries of state.

| Office | Minister | Party | Start of term | End of term |
|---|---|---|---|---|
| Prime Minister | Pedro Passos Coelho | PSD | 30 October 2015 | 26 November 2015 |
| Deputy Prime Minister | Paulo Portas | CDS–PP | 30 October 2015 | 26 November 2015 |
| Minister of State and Finance | Maria Luís Albuquerque | PSD | 30 October 2015 | 26 November 2015 |
| Minister of State and Foreign Affairs | Rui Machete | PSD | 30 October 2015 | 26 November 2015 |
| Minister of National Defence | José Pedro Aguiar-Branco | PSD | 30 October 2015 | 26 November 2015 |
| Minister of Internal Administration | João Calvão da Silva | PSD | 30 October 2015 | 26 November 2015 |
| Minister of Justice | Fernando Negrão | PSD | 30 October 2015 | 26 November 2015 |
| Minister of Parliamentary Affairs | Carlos Costa Neves | PSD | 30 October 2015 | 26 November 2015 |
| Minister of Presidency and Regional Development | Luís Marques Guedes | PSD | 30 October 2015 | 26 November 2015 |
| Minister of Economy | Miguel Morais Leitão | CDS–PP | 30 October 2015 | 26 November 2015 |
| Minister of Agriculture and Sea | Assunção Cristas | CDS–PP | 30 October 2015 | 26 November 2015 |
| Minister of Environment, Spatial Planning and Energy | Jorge Moreira da Silva | PSD | 30 October 2015 | 26 November 2015 |
| Minister of Health | Fernando Leal da Costa | Independent | 30 October 2015 | 26 November 2015 |
| MInister of Education and Science | Margarida Mano | Independent | 30 October 2015 | 26 November 2015 |
| MInister of Solidarity, Employment and Social Security | Pedro Mota Soares | CDS–PP | 30 October 2015 | 26 November 2015 |
| Minister of Administrative Modernization | Rui Medeiros | Independent | 30 October 2015 | 26 November 2015 |
| Minister of Culture, Equality and Citizenship | Teresa Morais | PSD | 30 October 2015 | 26 November 2015 |
