= 2025 Portuguese general strike =

Labour strike in Portugal

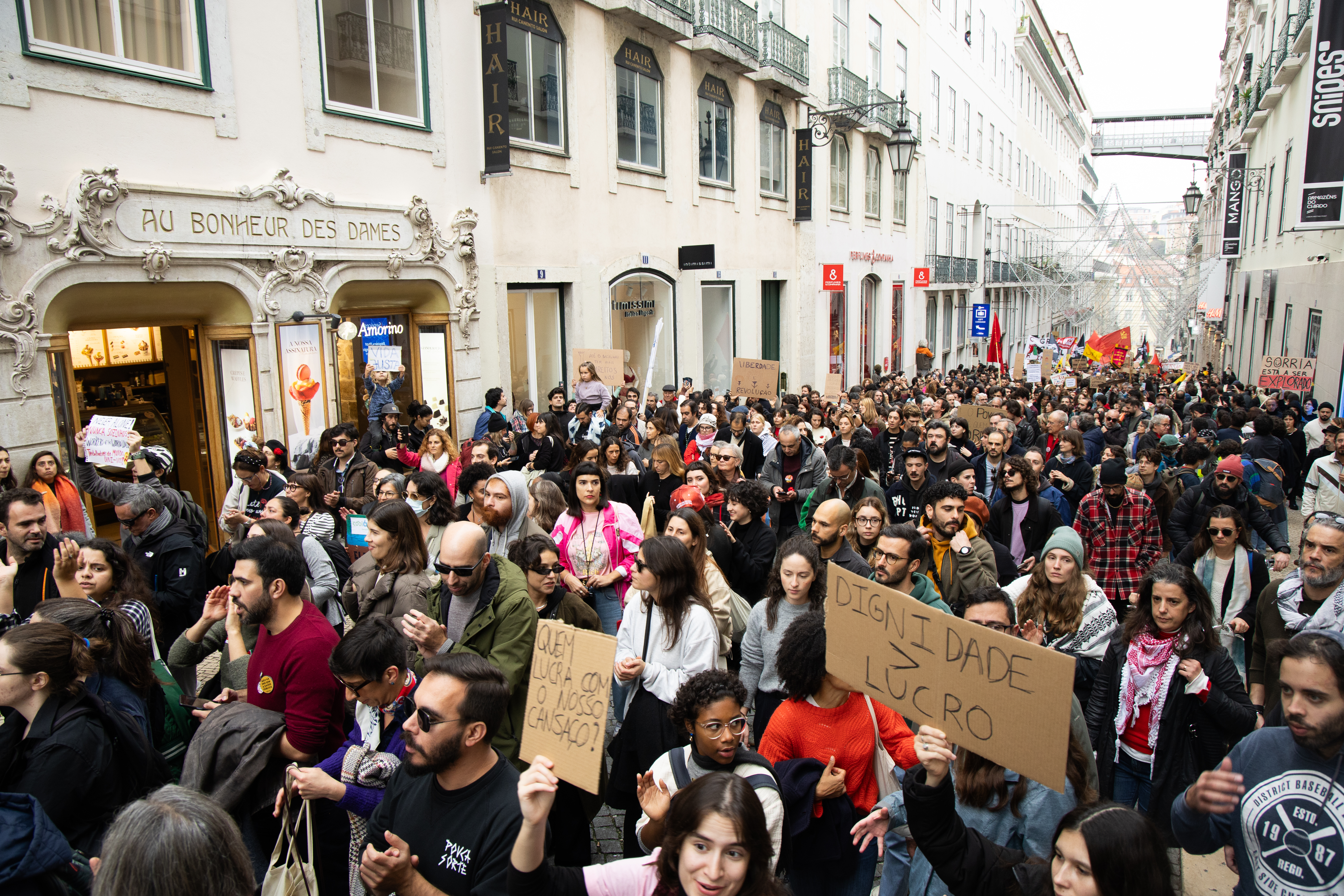
- Demonstrators in Lisbon
- Date: 11 December 2025
- Location: Portugal
- Caused by: Proposed labor package
- Methods: Strike action, rioting
- Status: Concluded

Parties
General Confederation of Portuguese Workers; General Union of Workers	XXV Constitutional Government of Portugal; Riot police

Lead figures
Tiago Oliveira; Mário Mourão	Luís Montenegro

Casualties
- Arrested: 6

The 2025 Portuguese general strike took place on 11 December against the policies of the Democratic Alliance government regarding the labor package. The demonstrations took place throughout the country, organized by the two main trade union federations, CGTP and UGT. This was the largest general strike since 2013, when Portugal went through its biggest financial austerity crisis. At the end of the demonstration in front of the Assembly of the Republic in Lisbon, clashes were recorded between riot police and demonstrators. Police dispersed the crowd with rubber bullets, resulting in the arrest of 6 people.
