= Gonçalo Saraiva Matias =

Portuguese politician (born 1979)

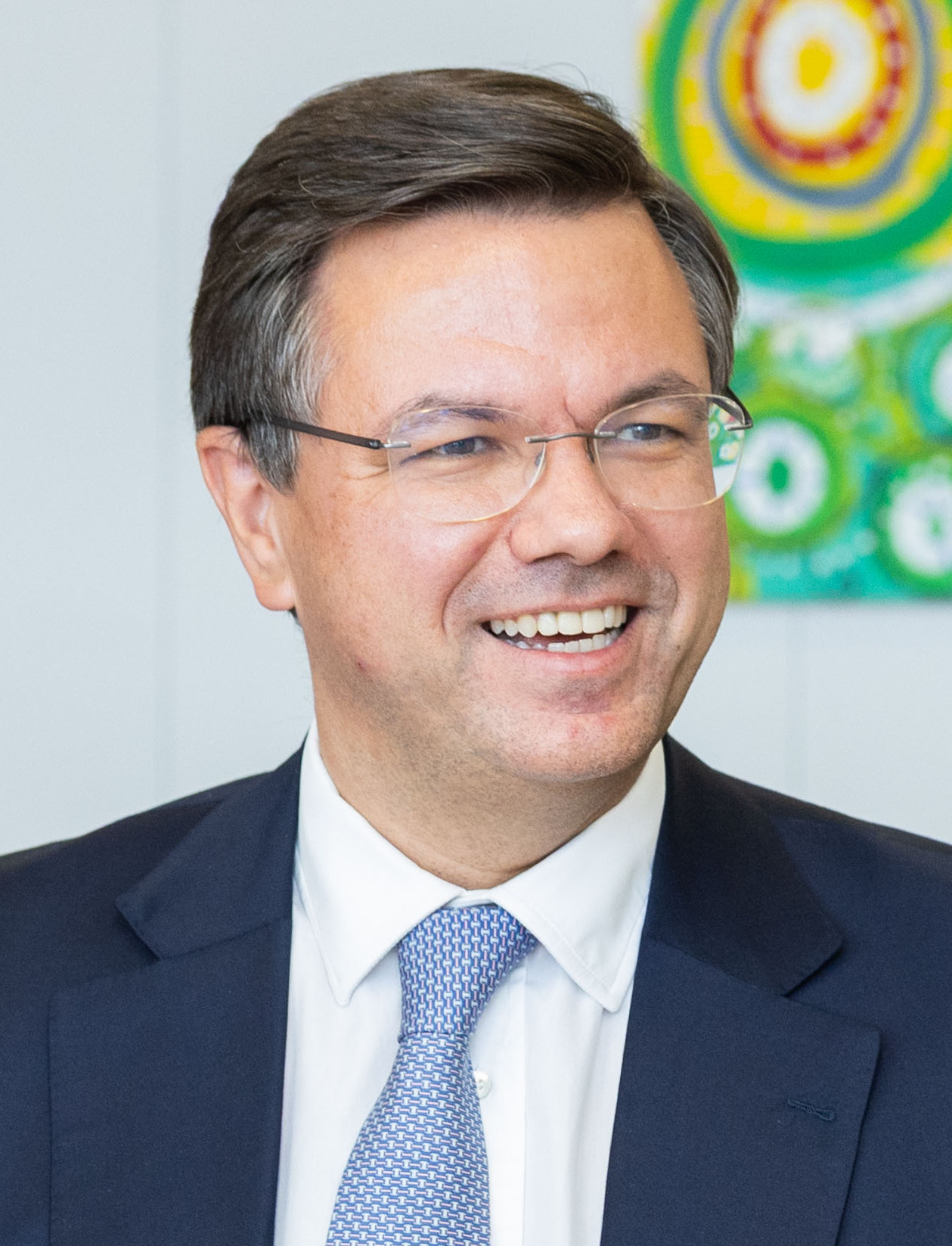
- Saraiva Matias in 2025

Minister in the Cabinet of the Prime Minister and of State Reform
- Incumbent
- Assumed office 5 June 2025
- Prime Minister: Luís Montenegro
- Preceded by: Manuel Castro Almeida (as Minister Adjunct and for Territorial Cohesion); Margarida Balseiro Lopes (as Minister of Youth and Modernization)

Secretary of State for Administrative Modernisation
- In office 30 October 2015 – 26 November 2015
- Prime Minister: Pedro Passos Coelho
- Minister: Rui Medeiros

Vice Director of the Faculty of Law of the Catholic University of Portugal
- In office December 2014 – January 2017

Personal details
- Born: Gonçalo Nuno da Cruz Saraiva Matias; 1 July 1979 (age 47) Lisbon, Portugal
- Party: Social Democratic Party
- Education: Catholic University of Portugal
- Occupation: Jurist • Professor

Gonçalo Nuno da Cruz Saraiva Matias GOIH (born 1 July 1979) is a Portuguese politician who has been nominated to serve as Minister Adjunct and for State Reform in the XXV Constitutional Government of Portugal. He is the president of the Fundação Francisco Manuel dos Santos.

He is a member of the Social Democratic Party since he was 18.
