= Temporary Committee on the alleged use of European countries by the CIA for the transport and illegal detention of prisoners =

The Temporary Committee on the alleged use of European countries by the CIA for the transport and illegal detention of prisoners, widely referred to as the CIA committee, was a Committee of the European Parliament that was set up in 2006 to investigate the alleged role of the U.S. Central Intelligence Agency in the extraordinary rendition of terrorists. The chairman of the committee was Carlos Coelho.

== Final report ==
An interim report was released in 2006, which stated that "the CIA or other US services have been directly responsible for the illegal seizure, removal, abduction and detention of terrorist suspects on the territory of member states".

The Chairman of the committee, Carlos Coelho, claimed that the CIA's extraordinary renditions in Europe was carried out "with the knowledge and support of European national governments".

In 2007, the final report of the committee was released, which revealed the existence of secret detention facilities in Europe. According to the report, over one thousand CIA-operated flights used European airspace from 2001 to 2005.

The report also included the following details:

- Officials of the Italian military security services (SISMI) played an "active role" in the abduction of Abu Omar in the Italian capital Milan. In addition, the director of the SISMI had "concealed the truth" when he denied the SISMI's involvement.
- The Republic of Macedonia failed to thoroughly investigate the abduction of Khalid El-Masri.
- The Polish government failed to cooperate with the committee in its investigations.
- The German Government refused to allow the United States to release rendition victim Murat Kurnaz, who was interrogated twice by German officials, from the Guantanamo Bay detention camp.

== Reception ==
The committee's final report was approved by the European Parliament with 382 votes in favour, 256 against, and 74 abstentions.

== See also ==
- Temporary Committee on the ECHELON Interception System
