= José António Vieira da Silva =

Portuguese politician

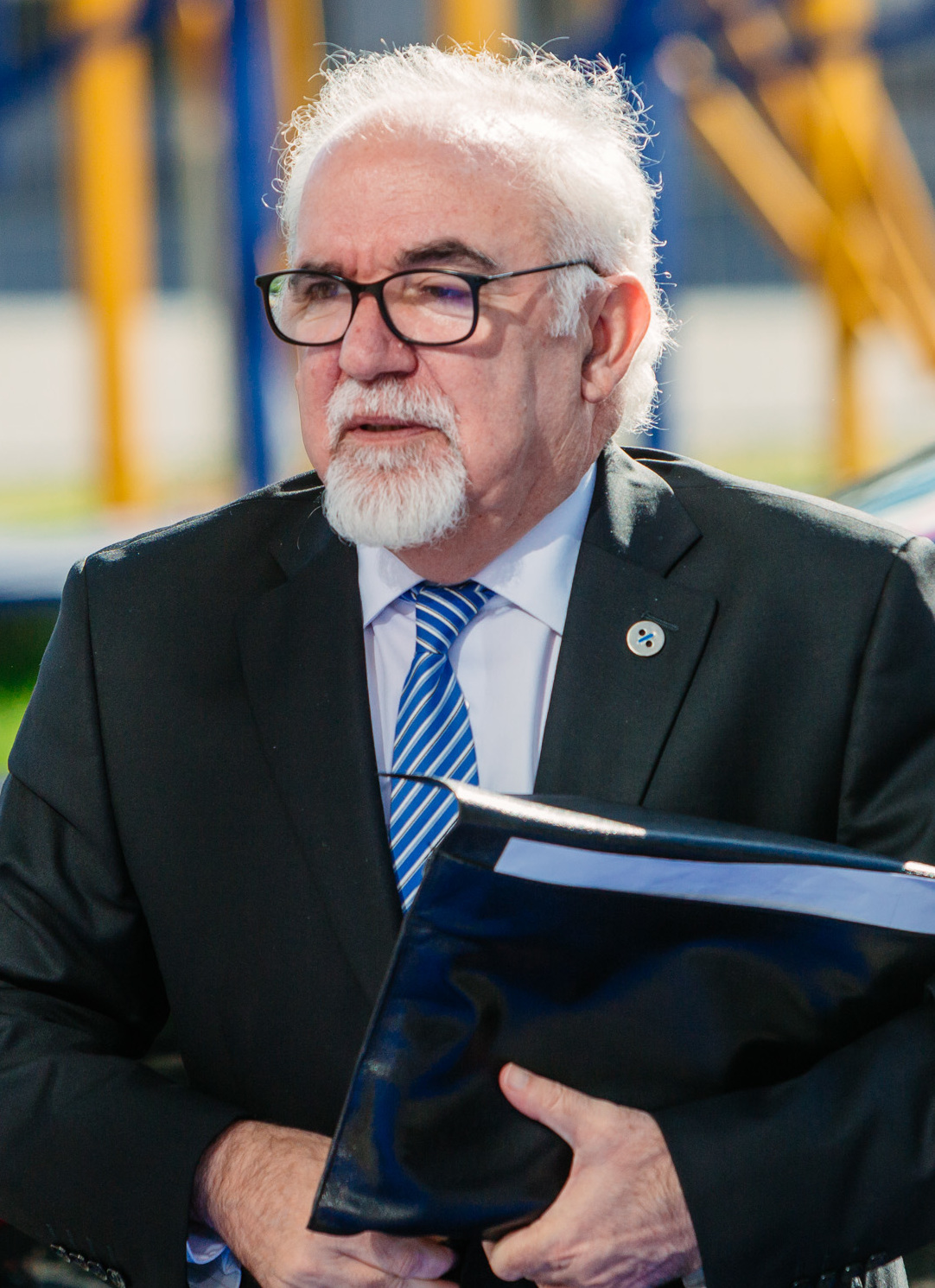
- Vieira da Silva in July 2017

Minister of Labour, Solidarity and Social Security
- In office 26 November 2015 – 26 October 2019
- Prime Minister: António Costa
- Preceded by: Pedro Mota Soares
- Succeeded by: Ana Mendes Godinho
- In office 12 March 2005 – 26 October 2009
- Prime Minister: José Sócrates
- Preceded by: Álvaro Barreto
- Succeeded by: Helena André

Minister of Economy, Innovation and Development
- In office 26 October 2009 – 21 June 2011
- Prime Minister: José Sócrates
- Preceded by: Fernando Teixeira dos Santos
- Succeeded by: Álvaro Santos Pereira

Personal details
- Born: José António da Fonseca Vieira da Silva; 14 February 1953 (age 73) Marinha Grande, Leiria, Portugal
- Party: Socialist Party
- Relatives: Mariana Vieira da Silva (daughter)

José António da Fonseca Vieira da Silva (born 14 February 1953) is a Portuguese politician and a member of the Socialist Party. He served as Minister of Solidarity, Employment and Social Security from 2015 to 2019 under Prime Minister António Costa.
