= 2023 Portuguese public sector strikes =

2023 Labour strikes in Portugal

In early 2023 Portugal saw widespread protests by public school teachers and education staff demanding higher wages and improved working conditions amid a growing cost of living crisis.

== Service disruption ==
In January tens of thousands of teachers and school staff took to the streets of Lisbon to protest for higher wages and better working conditions, marking one of the largest demonstrations in recent years. This was part of an ongoing wave of discontent among public sector employees, including doctors, nurses, and civil servants, who staged walk-outs to demand wage increases.

The strike actions led to significant service disruptions nationwide. Many schools and courts were shut down, hospital appointments and surgeries were canceled, and garbage-collection services were halted.

== Reaction ==
The Portuguese government responded to the strikes with a combination of public appeals and legislative measures. Prime Minister António Costa, facing increasing pressure, resigned in November 2023 amid a corruption investigation involving several government officials. Subsequently, the Socialist Party held a leadership election in December 2023, resulting in Pedro Nuno Santos becoming the new Secretary-General.

Despite the political shifts, the government's direct approach to the strikes remained largely unchanged. Public-sector unions, particularly the General Confederation of the Portuguese Workers (CGTP), continued to demand substantial wage increases to match inflation rates. The government's offers, such as the proposed 3.6% pay rise, fell short of union expectations and were perceived as insufficient given the high inflation rates.

== Strikes in 2025 ==
A nationwide strike – Portugal's largest after June 2013 – caused major disruption in various services like transport, hospitals and schools as various unions protested against government labour reforms. The draft law simplified firing, lengthened fixed-term contracts and expanded minimum service requirements. Lisbon’s train station was largely shut, TAP Air Portugal cancelled most of it flights, and many hospital appointments were postponed. According to Prime Minister Luís Montenegro about 100-plus measures aimed to boost growth and wages, but major unions, including the CGTP and General Union of Workers UGT, condemn the proposed changes. The CGTP staged about 20 demonstrations, calling the reforms a major attack on workers’ rights.
