= Ana Mendes Godinho =

Portuguese Minister of Labour, Solidarity and Social Security since 2022

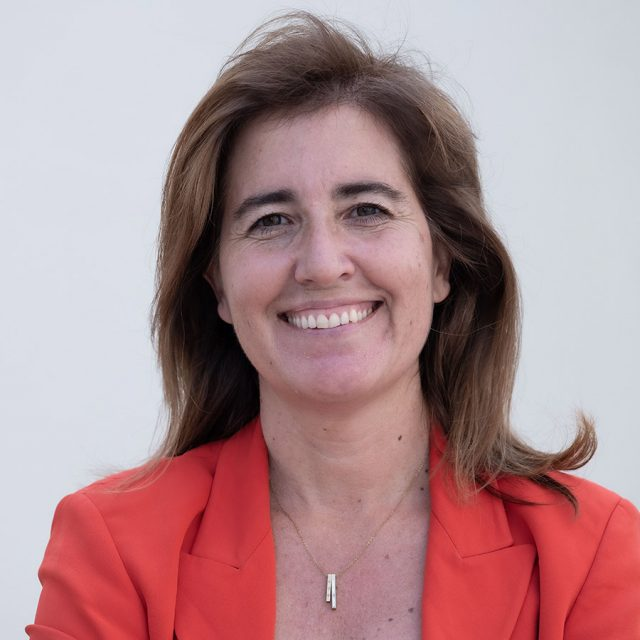
- Official portrait, 2021

Minister of Labour, Solidarity and Social Security
- In office 26 October 2019 – 2 April 2024
- Prime Minister: António Costa
- Preceded by: José António Vieira da Silva
- Succeeded by: Maria do Rosário Palma Ramalho

Secretary of State for Tourism
- In office 26 November 2015 – 26 October 2019
- Prime Minister: António Costa
- Preceded by: Adolfo Mesquita Nunes
- Succeeded by: Rita Marques

Member of the Assembly of the Republic
- In office 26 March 2024 – 18 May 2025
- Constituency: Guarda

Personal details
- Born: Ana Manuel Jerónimo Lopes Correia Mendes Godinho; 29 June 1972 (age 54) Lisbon, Portugal
- Party: Socialist Party
- Children: 3
- Education: University of Lisbon
- Occupation: jurist public servant politician
- Ana Godinho's voice Ana Mendes Godinho speaks in Portuguese Parliament; Recorded December 12, 2024

Ana Manuel Jerónimo Lopes Correia Mendes Godinho (born 29 June 1972) is a jurist, public servant, and politician from Portugal who currently serves as a councilor in Sintra City Council. She was the Minister of Labour, Solidarity, and Social Security in the XXII and XXIII Constitutional Governments, having previously served as Secretary of State for Tourism.

In January 2025, she was announced as the Socialist Party (PS) candidate for the presidency of the Sintra City Council in the 2025 local elections, the second most populous municipality in Portugal, finishing second with almost 32% of the votes in a close election.

== Early life and career ==
Ana Manuel Jerónimo Lopes Correia Mendes Godinho was born in the Portuguese capital, Lisbon on 29 June 1972, to a family from Vila Nova de Foz Côa. She has a younger brother. She went to high school at Colégio Mira Rio in Lisbon, a private institution linked to Opus Dei. She graduated in law from the Faculty of Law of the University of Lisbon and followed post-graduate studies in Labour Law. After a legal internship, she became a legal consultant to the Portuguese Ministry of National Defence and, later, the Directorate-General for Tourism, between 1997 and 2001. She is a qualified Labour Inspector and from 2001 directed the department for the Support of Inspection Activity at the Portuguese Authority for Working Conditions (ACT). She was vice-president of the Portuguese National Tourism Authority (Turismo de Portugal), and a member of the Board of two tourism companies. She also coordinated the post-graduate degree on Tourism Law at the Lisbon University.

== Political career ==
Mendes Godinho was deputy and chief of staff to the Secretary of State for Tourism, Bernardo Trindade, in the first government led by Prime Minister José Sócrates from 2005. She represented Portugal on the Technical Committee on Tourism and Related Services of the International Organization for Standardization. In 2015, she became Secretary of State for Tourism in the first government of António Costa.

In 2019, Mendes Godinho became Minister of Labour, Solidarity and Social Security in Costa's second government. She was reappointed to that position following the 2022 Portuguese legislative election. As minister, she introduced legislation to ban companies in Portugal from contacting employees outside working hours and to make them meet their extra energy and communications costs under what the Financial Times described as "one of Europe's most employee-friendly laws for regulating homeworking."

== Personal life ==
Mendes Godinho is married and has three children.
