= Dulcineia Moura =

Portuguese academic and politician

Member of the Assembly of the Republic
- Incumbent
- Assumed office 26 March 2024
- Constituency: Guarda

Member of the Guarda Municipal Assembly
- Incumbent
- Assumed office 26 September 2021

Personal details
- Born: 20 September 1980 (age 46) Guarda, Portugal
- Party: Social Democratic Party
- Children: 2
- Education: University of Beira Interior
- Occupation: Professor of business • economist • politician

Dulcineia Catarina Moura de Sousa Coito (born 20 September 1980) is a Portuguese professor teaching at the Higher Institute of Business and Tourism (ISCET) in Porto. She has a PhD in economics from the University of Beira Interior, where she is a researcher at the Research Centre in Business Sciences (NECE). In March 2024 she was elected to the Portuguese parliament as a representative of the Democratic Alliance for Guarda.

== Education ==
Moura was born on 20 September 1980. She obtained a post-graduate degree in territorial marketing and a PhD in economics from the University of Beira Interior. Her doctorate thesis was titled "Determining factors of innovative performance in Portuguese companies: cooperation, absorptive capacity and public policies" and aimed to better understand whether firm cooperation and absorptive capacity foster success in seeking public financial support for innovation activities and, by doing so, how they contribute to innovation output. She concluded that as the level of absorptive capacity in Portuguese firms increases, so the demand for public financial support from the European Union to stimulate innovation also increases.

== Career ==
Moura is a researcher as a member of the Scientific Council of the NECE – Research Centre in Business Sciences (at the University of Beira Interior). Her professional career has concentrated on regional development, tourism promotion and cross-border cooperation projects. She is the executive coordinator of Território do Côa - Associação de Desenvolvimento Regional, which promotes tourism to the Côa River valley of Portugal. Moura is also a higher education teacher at ISCET in Porto, and also works as a business consultant and as a guest speaker to regional and tourist promotion initiatives, with the aim of promoting innovation and fostering entrepreneurial skills. She is the author or co-author of several books and regularly contributes articles to local and regional newspapers in the Guarda area.

== Political career ==
Moura is a member of the Social Democratic Party of Portugal (PSD), in which capacity she became a deputy in the municipal assembly of Guarda and represented Guarda in the Assembly of the intermunicipal community of the Beiras e Serra da Estrela. In January 2024 she was chosen as head of the Democratic Alliance (AD) list of candidates for the three seats in the Assembly of the Republic allocated to Guarda. Despite the AD winning over one-third of the votes in the constituency, she was the only representative of the Alliance to be elected. Her campaign had focused on a mix of national and local issues. She was re-elected in the 2025 election called after the prime minister, Luís Montenegro, lost a confidence vote.
