= Guarda (Assembly of the Republic constituency) =

Constituency of the Assembly of the Republic, the national legislature of Portugal

- Constituency for the Assembly of the Republic
- Location of Guarda within Portugal
- District: Guarda
- Population: 142,210 (2024)
- Electorate: 139,506 (2025)
- Area: 5,535 km^{2} (2024)

Current Constituency
- Created: 1976
- Seats: List: 3 (2019–present); 4 (1991–2019); 5 (1979–1991); 6 (1976–1979)
- Deputies: List: Aida Carvalho (PS); Nuno Simões de Melo (CH); Dulcineia Catarina Moura (PSD)

Guarda is one of the 22 multi-member constituencies of the Assembly of the Republic, the national legislature of Portugal. The constituency was established in 1976 when the Assembly of the Republic was established by the constitution following the restoration of democracy. It is conterminous with the district of Guarda. The constituency currently elects three of the 230 members of the Assembly of the Republic using the closed party-list proportional representation electoral system. At the 2025 legislative election it had 139,506 registered electors.

== Electoral system ==
Guarda currently elects three of the 230 members of the Assembly of the Republic using the closed party-list proportional representation electoral system. Seats are allocated using the D'Hondt method.

== Election results ==
=== Summary ===
Election	Unitary Democrats CDU / APU / PCP			Left Bloc BE / UDP			LIVRE L			Socialists PS / FRS			People Animals Nature PAN			Democratic Renewal PRD			Social Democrats PSD / PàF / AD / PPD			Liberals IL			CDS – People's CDS–PP / CDS			Chega CH / PPV/CDC / PPV		
Election	Votes	%	Seats	Votes	%	Seats	Votes	%	Seats	Votes	%	Seats	Votes	%	Seats	Votes	%	Seats	Votes	%	Seats	Votes	%	Seats	Votes	%	Seats	Votes	%	Seats
2025	1,037	1.31%	0	1,010	1.27%	0	1,229	1.55%	0	21,554	27.20%	1	607	0.77%	0				32,295	40.75%	1	1,995	2.52%	0				17,249	21.76%	1
2024	1,331	1.61%	0	2,299	2.78%	0	1,153	1.40%	0	27,094	32.81%	1	822	1.00%	0				29,013	35.13%	1	1,910	2.31%	0				15,837	19.18%	1
2022	1,364	1.81%	0	2,368	3.14%	0	419	0.55%	0	34,867	46.16%	2	506	0.67%	0				25,882	34.27%	1	1,492	1.98%	0	1,716	2.27%	0	6,134	8.12%	0
2019	2,295	3.16%	0	5,990	8.25%	0	373	0.51%	0	28,789	39.67%	2	1,223	1.69%	0				26,349	36.30%	1	461	0.64%	0	3,823	5.27%	0	1,135	1.56%	0
2015	3,380	4.13%	0	6,348	7.75%	0	289	0.35%	0	28,867	35.26%	2	734	0.90%	0				39,018	47.66%	2									
2011	3,299	3.71%	0	3,114	3.50%	0				26,263	29.53%	1	520	0.58%	0				43,024	48.38%	3				10,426	11.72%	0	286	0.32%	0
2009	3,344	3.37%	0	7,730	7.80%	0				36,839	37.16%	2							36,428	36.74%	2				11,426	11.52%	0	299	0.30%	0
2005	2,969	3.03%	0	3,452	3.53%	0				47,290	48.31%	2							35,092	35.85%	2				7,035	7.19%	0			
2002	2,234	2.26%	0	1,231	1.25%	0				34,991	35.42%	2							48,972	49.58%	2				9,657	9.78%	0			
1999	3,228	3.24%	0	1,088	1.09%	0				44,271	44.41%	2							40,004	40.13%	2				10,014	10.05%	0			
1995	2,602	2.35%	0	582	0.53%	0				49,498	44.70%	2							45,285	40.90%	2				11,265	10.17%	0			
1991	2,545	2.30%	0							30,288	27.37%	1				886	0.80%	0	66,306	59.92%	3				6,676	6.03%	0			
1987	3,934	3.42%	0	325	0.28%	0				25,783	22.42%	1				2,369	2.06%	0	71,133	61.86%	4				7,827	6.81%	0			
1985	6,234	5.42%	0	961	0.84%	0				27,652	24.04%	2				12,970	11.27%	0	39,984	34.76%	2				23,139	20.11%	1			
1983	5,806	5.10%	0	410	0.36%	0				39,618	34.79%	2							37,233	32.69%	2				28,135	24.71%	1			
1980	6,517	5.15%	0	971	0.77%	0				34,428	27.18%	1							79,196	62.53%	4									
1979	7,202	5.57%	0	1,250	0.97%	0				35,112	27.15%	1							81,115	62.73%	4									
1976	3,583	3.16%	0	1,368	1.21%	0				30,746	27.14%	2							31,307	27.63%	2				39,120	34.53%	2			

(Figures in italics represent alliances.)

=== Detailed ===
==== 2020s ====
===== 2025 =====
Results of the 2025 legislative election held on 18 May 2025:

Party		Votes	%	Seats
Democratic Alliance	AD	32,295	40.75%	1
Socialist Party	PS	21,554	27.20%	1
Chega	CH	17,249	21.76%	1
Liberal Initiative	IL	1,995	2.52%	0
National Democratic Alternative	ADN	1,662	2.10%	0
LIVRE	L	1,229	1.55%	0
Unitary Democratic Coalition	CDU	1,037	1.31%	0
Left Bloc	BE	1,010	1.27%	0
People Animals Nature	PAN	607	0.77%	0
People's Monarchist Party	PPM	170	0.21%	0
React, Include, Recycle	RIR	134	0.17%	0
Volt Portugal	Volt	118	0.15%	0
We, the Citizens!	NC	117	0.15%	0
Ergue-te	E	80	0.10%	0
Valid votes		79,257	100.00%	3
Blank votes		1,179	1.44%	
Rejected votes – other		1,185	1.45%	
Total polled		81,621	58.51%	
Registered electors		139,506		

The following candidates were elected:: Aida Carvalho (PS); Nuno Simões de Melo (CH); and Dulcineia Catarina Moura (AD).

===== 2024 =====
Results of the 2024 legislative election held on 10 March 2024:

Party		Votes	%	Seats
Democratic Alliance	AD	29,013	35.13%	1
Socialist Party	PS	27,094	32.81%	1
Chega	CH	15,837	19.18%	1
Left Bloc	BE	2,299	2.78%	0
National Democratic Alternative	ADN	2,181	2.64%	0
Liberal Initiative	IL	1,910	2.31%	0
Unitary Democratic Coalition	CDU	1,331	1.61%	0
LIVRE	L	1,153	1.40%	0
People Animals Nature	PAN	822	1.00%	0
New Right	ND	292	0.35%	0
React, Include, Recycle	RIR	289	0.35%	0
Ergue-te	E	184	0.22%	0
Volt Portugal	Volt	96	0.12%	0
Alternative 21 (Earth Party and Alliance)	PT-A	80	0.10%	0
Valid votes		82,581	100.00%	3
Blank votes		1,163	1.37%	
Rejected votes – other		1,290	1.52%	
Total polled		85,034	60.28%	
Registered electors		141,065		

The following candidates were elected: Ana Mendes Godinho (PS); Nuno Simões de Melo (CH); and Dulcineia Catarina Moura (AD).

===== 2022 =====
Results of the 2022 legislative election held on 30 January 2022:

Party		Votes	%	Seats
Socialist Party	PS	34,867	46.16%	2
Social Democratic Party	PSD	25,882	34.27%	1
Chega	CH	6,134	8.12%	0
Left Bloc	BE	2,368	3.14%	0
CDS – People's Party	CDS–PP	1,716	2.27%	0
Liberal Initiative	IL	1,492	1.98%	0
Unitary Democratic Coalition	CDU	1,364	1.81%	0
People Animals Nature	PAN	506	0.67%	0
LIVRE	L	419	0.55%	0
React, Include, Recycle	RIR	341	0.45%	0
Ergue-te	E	120	0.16%	0
Volt Portugal	Volt	117	0.15%	0
Earth Party	PT	69	0.09%	0
Socialist Alternative Movement	MAS	67	0.09%	0
Portuguese Labour Party	PTP	66	0.09%	0
Valid votes		75,528	100.00%	3
Blank votes		782	1.01%	
Rejected votes – other		936	1.21%	
Total polled		77,246	52.89%	
Registered electors		146,041		

The following candidates were elected: Gustavo Duarte (PSD); Ana Mendes Godinho (PS); and António Monteirinho (PS).

==== 2010s ====
===== 2019 =====
Results of the 2019 legislative election held on 6 October 2019:

Party		Votes	%	Seats
Socialist Party	PS	28,789	39.67%	2
Social Democratic Party	PSD	26,349	36.30%	1
Left Bloc	BE	5,990	8.25%	0
CDS – People's Party	CDS–PP	3,823	5.27%	0
Unitary Democratic Coalition	CDU	2,295	3.16%	0
People Animals Nature	PAN	1,223	1.69%	0
Chega	CH	1,135	1.56%	0
Liberal Initiative	IL	461	0.64%	0
React, Include, Recycle	RIR	458	0.63%	0
Alliance	A	406	0.56%	0
LIVRE	L	373	0.51%	0
Portuguese Workers' Communist Party	PCTP	363	0.50%	0
Portuguese Labour Party	PTP	171	0.24%	0
National Renewal Party	PNR	165	0.23%	0
United Party of Retirees and Pensioners	PURP	154	0.21%	0
Earth Party	PT	122	0.17%	0
We, the Citizens!	NC	118	0.16%	0
Democratic Republican Party	PDR	103	0.14%	0
People's Monarchist Party	PPM	80	0.11%	0
Valid votes		72,578	100.00%	3
Blank votes		2,030	2.65%	
Rejected votes – other		2,041	2.66%	
Total polled		76,649	50.58%	
Registered electors		151,535		

The following candidates were elected: Ana Mendes Godinho (PS); Santinho Pacheco (PS); and Carlos Peixoto (PSD).

===== 2015 =====
Results of the 2015 legislative election held on 4 October 2015:

Party		Votes	%	Seats
Portugal Ahead	PàF	39,018	47.66%	2
Socialist Party	PS	28,867	35.26%	2
Left Bloc	BE	6,348	7.75%	0
Unitary Democratic Coalition	CDU	3,380	4.13%	0
Democratic Republican Party	PDR	957	1.17%	0
People Animals Nature	PAN	734	0.90%	0
Portuguese Workers' Communist Party	PCTP	690	0.84%	0
National Renewal Party	PNR	391	0.48%	0
The Earth Party Movement	MPT	299	0.37%	0
LIVRE	L	289	0.35%	0
ACT! (Portuguese Labour Party and Socialist Alternative Movement)	AGIR	278	0.34%	0
People's Monarchist Party	PPM	214	0.26%	0
We, the Citizens!	NC	182	0.22%	0
United Party of Retirees and Pensioners	PURP	143	0.17%	0
Together for the People	JPP	82	0.10%	0
Valid votes		81,872	100.00%	4
Blank votes		1,737	2.03%	
Rejected votes – other		2,000	2.34%	
Total polled		85,609	52.37%	
Registered electors		163,456		

The following candidates were elected: Ângela Guerra (PàF); Santinho Pacheco (PS); Carlos Peixoto (PàF); and Maria Antónia Almeida Santos (PS).

===== 2011 =====
Results of the 2011 legislative election held on 5 June 2011:

Party		Votes	%	Seats
Social Democratic Party	PSD	43,024	48.38%	3
Socialist Party	PS	26,263	29.53%	1
CDS – People's Party	CDS–PP	10,426	11.72%	0
Unitary Democratic Coalition	CDU	3,299	3.71%	0
Left Bloc	BE	3,114	3.50%	0
Portuguese Workers' Communist Party	PCTP	755	0.85%	0
Party for Animals and Nature	PAN	520	0.58%	0
Pro-Life Party	PPV	286	0.32%	0
The Earth Party Movement	MPT	251	0.28%	0
Hope for Portugal Movement	MEP	225	0.25%	0
Democratic Party of the Atlantic	PDA	200	0.22%	0
Portuguese Labour Party	PTP	199	0.22%	0
People's Monarchist Party	PPM	191	0.21%	0
National Renewal Party	PNR	178	0.20%	0
Valid votes		88,931	100.00%	4
Blank votes		2,241	2.41%	
Rejected votes – other		1,700	1.83%	
Total polled		92,872	53.87%	
Registered electors		172,393		

The following candidates were elected: Paulo Ribeiro de Campos (PS); Ângela Guerra (PSD); Manuel Meirinho Martins (PSD); and Carlos Peixoto (PSD).

==== 2000s ====
===== 2009 =====
Results of the 2009 legislative election held on 27 September 2009:

Party		Votes	%	Seats
Socialist Party	PS	36,839	37.16%	2
Social Democratic Party	PSD	36,428	36.74%	2
CDS – People's Party	CDS–PP	11,426	11.52%	0
Left Bloc	BE	7,730	7.80%	0
Unitary Democratic Coalition	CDU	3,344	3.37%	0
Portuguese Workers' Communist Party	PCTP	1,114	1.12%	0
New Democracy Party	ND	518	0.52%	0
People's Monarchist Party	PPM	339	0.34%	0
Portuguese Labour Party	PTP	330	0.33%	0
Pro-Life Party	PPV	299	0.30%	0
Hope for Portugal Movement	MEP	291	0.29%	0
The Earth Party Movement and Humanist Party	MPT-PH	287	0.29%	0
Merit and Society Movement	MMS	197	0.20%	0
Valid votes		99,142	100.00%	4
Blank votes		1,473	1.44%	
Rejected votes – other		1,751	1.71%	
Total polled		102,366	64.76%	
Registered electors		158,060		

The following candidates were elected: Francisco de Assis (PS); José Pereira Marques (PS); Carlos Peixoto (PSD); and João Prata (PSD).

===== 2005 =====
Results of the 2005 legislative election held on 20 February 2005:

Party		Votes	%	Seats
Socialist Party	PS	47,290	48.31%	2
Social Democratic Party	PSD	35,092	35.85%	2
CDS – People's Party	CDS–PP	7,035	7.19%	0
Left Bloc	BE	3,452	3.53%	0
Unitary Democratic Coalition	CDU	2,969	3.03%	0
Portuguese Workers' Communist Party	PCTP	673	0.69%	0
New Democracy Party	ND	661	0.68%	0
Humanist Party	PH	372	0.38%	0
National Renewal Party	PNR	337	0.34%	0
Valid votes		97,881	100.00%	4
Blank votes		1,635	1.62%	
Rejected votes – other		1,540	1.52%	
Total polled		101,056	59.96%	
Registered electors		168,539		

The following candidates were elected: Fernando Cabral (PS); Miguel Frasquilho (PSD); Ana Manso (PSD); and Joaquim Pina Moura (PS).

===== 2002 =====
Results of the 2002 legislative election held on 17 March 2002:

Party		Votes	%	Seats
Social Democratic Party	PSD	48,972	49.58%	2
Socialist Party	PS	34,991	35.42%	2
CDS – People's Party	CDS–PP	9,657	9.78%	0
Unitary Democratic Coalition	CDU	2,234	2.26%	0
Left Bloc	BE	1,231	1.25%	0
Portuguese Workers' Communist Party	PCTP	543	0.55%	0
The Earth Party Movement	MPT	458	0.46%	0
Humanist Party	PH	384	0.39%	0
People's Monarchist Party	PPM	305	0.31%	0
Valid votes		98,775	100.00%	4
Blank votes		839	0.83%	
Rejected votes – other		1,295	1.28%	
Total polled		100,909	61.01%	
Registered electors		165,405		

The following candidates were elected: Fernando Cabral (PS); Ana Manso (PSD); Joaquim Pina Moura (PS); and Vasco Valdez (PSD).

==== 1990s ====
===== 1999 =====
Results of the 1999 legislative election held on 10 October 1999:

Party		Votes	%	Seats
Socialist Party	PS	44,271	44.41%	2
Social Democratic Party	PSD	40,004	40.13%	2
CDS – People's Party	CDS–PP	10,014	10.05%	0
Unitary Democratic Coalition	CDU	3,228	3.24%	0
Left Bloc	BE	1,088	1.09%	0
Portuguese Workers' Communist Party	PCTP	667	0.67%	0
The Earth Party Movement	MPT	413	0.41%	0
Valid votes		99,685	100.00%	4
Blank votes		897	0.88%	
Rejected votes – other		1,513	1.48%	
Total polled		102,095	59.49%	
Registered electors		171,619		

The following candidates were elected: Álvaro Amaro (PSD); Maria do Carmo Borges (PS); Ana Manso (PSD); and Santinho Pacheco (PS).

===== 1995 =====
Results of the 1995 legislative election held on 1 October 1995:

Party		Votes	%	Seats
Socialist Party	PS	49,498	44.70%	2
Social Democratic Party	PSD	45,285	40.90%	2
CDS – People's Party	CDS–PP	11,265	10.17%	0
Unitary Democratic Coalition	CDU	2,602	2.35%	0
Popular Democratic Union	UDP	582	0.53%	0
Revolutionary Socialist Party	PSR	534	0.48%	0
National Solidarity Party	PSN	485	0.44%	0
Portuguese Workers' Communist Party	PCTP	479	0.43%	0
Valid votes		110,730	100.00%	4
Blank votes		802	0.71%	
Rejected votes – other		1,874	1.65%	
Total polled		113,406	64.14%	
Registered electors		176,818		

The following candidates were elected: Álvaro Amaro (PSD); António Gouveia (PSD); Carlos Alberto Santos (PS); and António José Seguro (PS).

===== 1991 =====
Results of the 1991 legislative election held on 6 October 1991:

Party		Votes	%	Seats
Social Democratic Party	PSD	66,306	59.92%	3
Socialist Party	PS	30,288	27.37%	1
Social Democratic Centre Party	CDS	6,676	6.03%	0
Unitary Democratic Coalition	CDU	2,545	2.30%	0
National Solidarity Party	PSN	1,487	1.34%	0
Revolutionary Socialist Party	PSR	1,091	0.99%	0
Democratic Renewal Party	PRD	886	0.80%	0
Portuguese Workers' Communist Party	PCTP	662	0.60%	0
People's Monarchist Party	PPM	387	0.35%	0
Democratic Party of the Atlantic	PDA	322	0.29%	0
Valid votes		110,650	100.00%	4
Blank votes		885	0.78%	
Rejected votes – other		1,608	1.42%	
Total polled		113,143	65.35%	
Registered electors		173,132		

The following candidates were elected: Luís Carrilho da Cunha (PSD); Abílio Curto (PS); Manuel Dias Loureiro (PSD); and Marília Raimundo (PSD).

==== 1980s ====
===== 1987 =====
Results of the 1987 legislative election held on 19 July 1987:

Party		Votes	%	Seats
Social Democratic Party	PSD	71,133	61.86%	4
Socialist Party	PS	25,783	22.42%	1
Social Democratic Centre Party	CDS	7,827	6.81%	0
Unitary Democratic Coalition	CDU	3,934	3.42%	0
Democratic Renewal Party	PRD	2,369	2.06%	0
Christian Democratic Party	PDC	1,143	0.99%	0
People's Monarchist Party	PPM	667	0.58%	0
Portuguese Workers' Communist Party	PCTP	574	0.50%	0
Communist Party (Reconstructed)	PC(R)	532	0.46%	0
Portuguese Democratic Movement	MDP	379	0.33%	0
Revolutionary Socialist Party	PSR	331	0.29%	0
Popular Democratic Union	UDP	325	0.28%	0
Valid votes		114,997	100.00%	5
Blank votes		1,014	0.86%	
Rejected votes – other		2,529	2.13%	
Total polled		118,540	70.29%	
Registered electors		168,651		

The following candidates were elected: Álvaro de Carvalho (PSD); Abílio Curto (PS); Manuel Dias Loureiro (PSD); Assunção Marques (PSD); and Marília Raimundo (PSD).

===== 1985 =====
Results of the 1985 legislative election held on 6 October 1985:

Party		Votes	%	Seats
Social Democratic Party	PSD	39,984	34.76%	2
Socialist Party	PS	27,652	24.04%	2
Social Democratic Centre Party	CDS	23,139	20.11%	1
Democratic Renewal Party	PRD	12,970	11.27%	0
United People Alliance	APU	6,234	5.42%	0
Christian Democratic Party	PDC	1,830	1.59%	0
Popular Democratic Union	UDP	961	0.84%	0
Revolutionary Socialist Party	PSR	711	0.62%	0
Workers' Party of Socialist Unity	POUS	669	0.58%	0
Communist Party (Reconstructed)	PC(R)	459	0.40%	0
Portuguese Workers' Communist Party	PCTP	433	0.38%	0
Valid votes		115,042	100.00%	5
Blank votes		1,102	0.93%	
Rejected votes – other		2,803	2.36%	
Total polled		118,947	71.72%	
Registered electors		165,849		

The following candidates were elected: Abílio Curto (PS); Arménio Matias (PSD); Andrade Pereira (CDS); Marília Raimundo (PSD); and Veiga Simão (PS).

===== 1983 =====
Results of the 1983 legislative election held on 25 April 1983:

Party		Votes	%	Seats
Socialist Party	PS	39,618	34.79%	2
Social Democratic Party	PSD	37,233	32.69%	2
Social Democratic Centre Party	CDS	28,135	24.71%	1
United People Alliance	APU	5,806	5.10%	0
Christian Democratic Party	PDC	810	0.71%	0
Workers' Party of Socialist Unity	POUS	522	0.46%	0
People's Monarchist Party	PPM	502	0.44%	0
Popular Democratic Union	UDP	410	0.36%	0
Revolutionary Socialist Party	PSR	349	0.31%	0
Socialist Workers League	LST	253	0.22%	0
Portuguese Workers' Communist Party	PCTP	242	0.21%	0
Valid votes		113,880	100.00%	5
Blank votes		895	0.76%	
Rejected votes – other		3,518	2.97%	
Total polled		118,293	75.13%	
Registered electors		157,442		

The following candidates were elected: Luís Barbosa (CDS); Abílio Curto (PS); Marília Raimundo (PSD); Veiga Simão (PS); and José Valério (PSD).

===== 1980 =====
Results of the 1980 legislative election held on 5 October 1980:

Party		Votes	%	Seats
Democratic Alliance	AD	79,196	62.53%	4
Republican and Socialist Front	FRS	34,428	27.18%	1
United People Alliance	APU	6,517	5.15%	0
Workers' Party of Socialist Unity	POUS	2,280	1.80%	0
Revolutionary Socialist Party	PSR	1,010	0.80%	0
Popular Democratic Union	UDP	971	0.77%	0
Portuguese Workers' Communist Party	PCTP	899	0.71%	0
Labour Party	PT	840	0.66%	0
Christian Democratic Party, Independent Movement for the National Reconstruction / Party of the Portuguese Right and National Front	PDC- MIRN/ PDP- FN	519	0.41%	0
Valid votes		126,660	100.00%	5
Blank votes		1,033	0.79%	
Rejected votes – other		3,047	2.33%	
Total polled		130,740	83.58%	
Registered electors		156,432		

The following candidates were elected: Alberto Antunes (FRS); Luís Barbosa (AD); Emílio Leitão (AD); Fernando Cardote Mesquita (AD); and Marília Raimundo (AD).

==== 1970s ====
===== 1979 =====
Results of the 1979 legislative election held on 2 December 1979:

Party		Votes	%	Seats
Democratic Alliance	AD	81,115	62.73%	4
Socialist Party	PS	35,112	27.15%	1
United People Alliance	APU	7,202	5.57%	0
Christian Democratic Party	PDC	1,617	1.25%	0
Revolutionary Socialist Party	PSR	1,331	1.03%	0
Popular Democratic Union	UDP	1,250	0.97%	0
Portuguese Workers' Communist Party	PCTP	886	0.69%	0
Left-wing Union for the Socialist Democracy	UEDS	805	0.62%	0
Valid votes		129,318	100.00%	5
Blank votes		795	0.59%	
Rejected votes – other		3,658	2.73%	
Total polled		133,771	86.59%	
Registered electors		154,485		

The following candidates were elected: Carlos Faria Almeida (AD); Luís Barbosa (AD); Assunção Marques (AD); Marília Raimundo (AD); and António de Almeida Santos (PS).

===== 1976 =====
Results of the 1976 legislative election held on 25 April 1976:

Party		Votes	%	Seats
Social Democratic Centre Party	CDS	39,120	34.53%	2
Democratic People's Party	PPD	31,307	27.63%	2
Socialist Party	PS	30,746	27.14%	2
Portuguese Communist Party	PCP	3,583	3.16%	0
People's Socialist Front	FSP	1,717	1.52%	0
Christian Democratic Party	PDC	1,668	1.47%	0
Popular Democratic Union	UDP	1,368	1.21%	0
Movement of Socialist Left	MES	1,200	1.06%	0
People's Monarchist Party	PPM	1,125	0.99%	0
Re-Organized Movement of the Party of the Proletariat	MRPP	1,009	0.89%	0
Internationalist Communist League	LCI	452	0.40%	0
Valid votes		113,295	100.00%	6
Rejected votes		8,781	7.19%	
Total polled		122,076	82.17%	
Registered electors		148,574		

The following candidates were elected: António Júlio Aguiar (PPD); Carlos Faria Almeida (CDS); Vilhena de Carvalho (PPD); Emílio Leitão (CDS); Eduardo Pereira (PS); and Barros dos Santos (PS).
