= Álvaro Amaro =

Portuguese politician (born 1953)

Member of the European Parliament for Portugal
- In office 2 July 2019 – 6 July 2023
- Succeeded by: Carlos Coelho

Mayor of Guarda
- In office 29 September 2013 – 16 April 2019
- Preceded by: Joaquim Valente
- Succeeded by: Carlos Alberto Monteiro

Mayor of Gouveia
- In office 16 December 2001 – 29 September 2013
- Preceded by: António Pacheco
- Succeeded by: Luís Tadeu

Member of the Assembly of the Republic
- In office 1 October 1995 – 16 December 2001
- Constituency: Guarda

Secretary of State for Agriculture
- In office 17 August 1987 – 28 October 1995
- Prime Minister: Aníbal Cavaco Silva
- Minister: Álvaro Barreto; Arlindo Cunha; António Duarte Silva

Personal details
- Born: Álvaro dos Santos Amaro; 25 May 1953 (age 72) Coimbra, Portugal
- Party: Social Democratic Party

Álvaro dos Santos Amaro (born 25 May 1953) is a Portuguese politician of the Social Democratic Party (PSD) who served as a Member of the European Parliament from 2019 to 2023.

Amaro was elected as Member of the European Parliament following the 2019 European elections. In parliament, he served on the Committee on Agriculture and Rural Development. In addition to his committee assignments, he was part of the parliament's delegation to the ACP–EU Joint Parliamentary Assembly.

In June 2019, Amaro was named a formal suspect in the Rota Final investigation case, due to his alleged involvement in a fraudulent scheme of rigging public contracting procedures while mayor of Guarda. He made a 40,000€ bail deposit and took office as MEP the following month.

Amaro's parliamentary immunity was lifted in February 2021 following an indictment for malfeasance and fraud in obtaining EU funds for the GuardaFolia carnaval event in 2014. These charges were dropped in July the same year, for lack of concrete evidence.

In April 2023, Álvaro Amaro was charged for malfeasance in public-private partnerships established while mayor of Gouveia, between 2007 and 2011. He was sentenced to 3.5 years in prison (suspended by a fine of 25,000€ within a year) and stepped down as MEP shortly after.
