= Carlos Coelho (politician) =

Portuguese politician

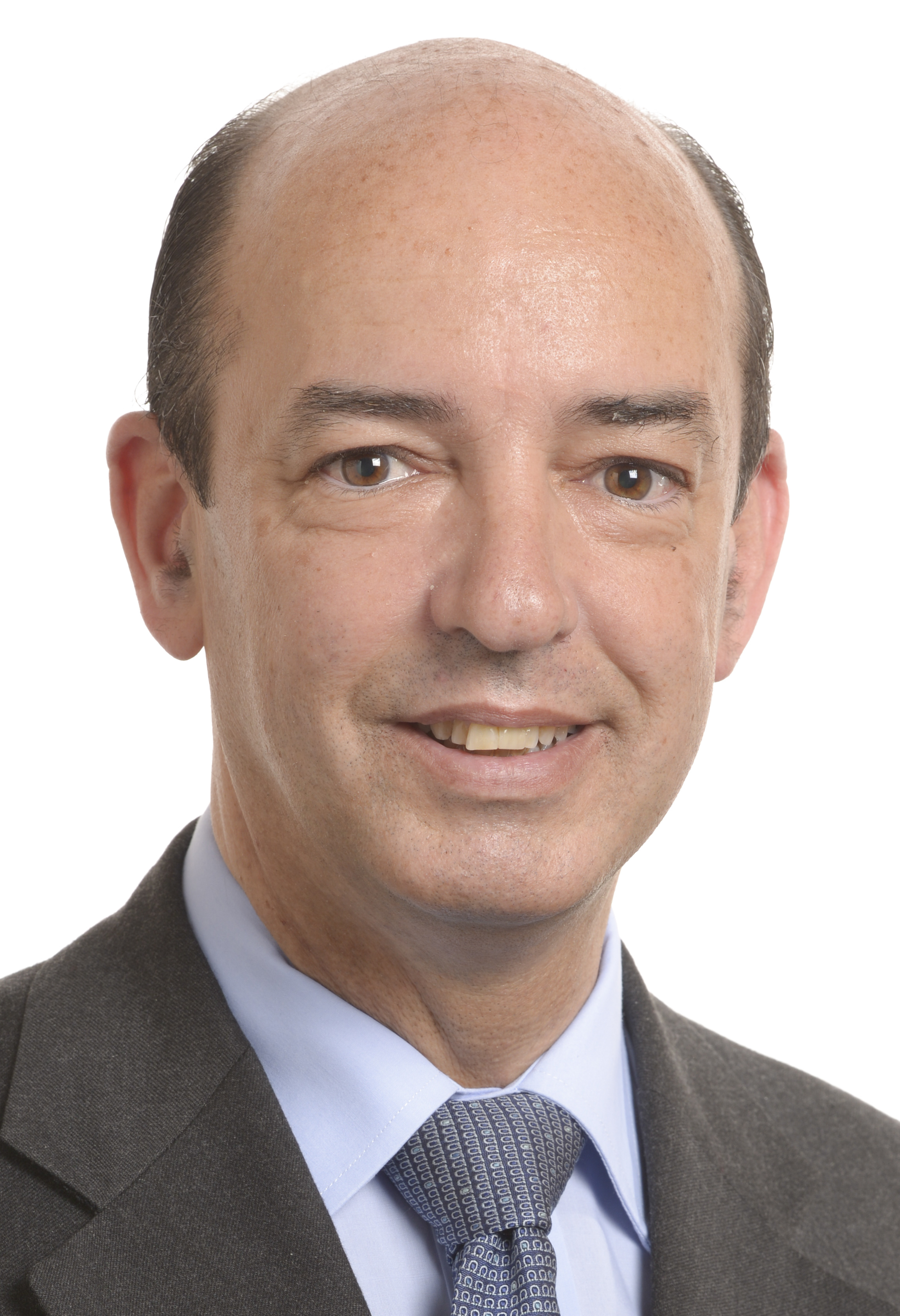
- Official portrait as an MEP, 2014

Member of the European Parliament for Portugal
- In office 7 July 2023 – 15 July 2024
- Preceded by: Álvaro Amaro
- In office 14 September 1998 – 1 July 2019
- In office 19 July 1994 – 25 July 1994

Member of the Assembly of the Republic
- In office 1 October 1995 – 13 September 1998
- Constituency: Santarém
- In office 25 April 1983 – 18 July 1994
- Constituency: Lisbon (1983–1991); Santarém (1991–1994)
- In office May 1980 – June 1980
- Constituency: Lisbon

Undersecretary of State Adjunct to the Minister of Education
- In office 25 July 1994 – 28 October 1995
- Prime Minister: Aníbal Cavaco Silva
- Minister: Manuela Ferreira Leite

President of the Social Democratic Youth
- In office October 1986 – March 1990
- Preceded by: Pedro Augusto Pinto
- Succeeded by: Pedro Passos Coelho

Personal details
- Born: Carlos Miguel Maximiano de Almeida Coelho; 20 May 1960 (age 66) Lisbon, Portugal
- Party: Social Democratic Party (1978–present)
- Other political affiliations: Social Democratic Youth
- Education: University of Lisbon

Carlos Miguel Maximiano de Almeida Coelho (born 20 May 1960) is a Portuguese politician who served as a Member of the European Parliament from 1998 until 2019, and again between 2023 and 2024. He is a member of the Social Democratic Party, part of the EPP Group.

== Member of the European Parliament ==
From 11 July 2000 to 6 September 2001, Coelho served as the chairman of the Temporary Committee on the ECHELON Interception System.

From 26 January 2006 to 14 February 2007, Coelho was chairman of the Temporary Committee on the alleged use of European countries by the CIA for the transport and illegal detention of prisoners. In addition to his committee assignments, he is a member of the European Parliament Intergroup on Children's Rights and of the European Parliament Intergroup on Disability.

He returned to the European Parliament in July 2023, following the conviction of Álvaro Amaro.
