= Temporary Committee on the ECHELON Interception System =

The Temporary Committee on the ECHELON Interception System was a Committee of the European Parliament that was set up in 2000 to investigate the global surveillance network ECHELON. The committee issued its final report in 2001.

== Background ==
On 15 June 2000, the Conference of Presidents of the European Parliament proposed setting up a temporary committee on the ECHELON interception system. The goal of the committee was to confirm the existence of ECHELON and to assess the compatibility of such a system with European law.

The committee was chaired by the Portuguese politician Carlos Coelho. It began investigating the ECHELON system in late 2000.

== Final report ==
In 2001, the committee concluded that the ECHELON surveillance system "almost certainly" existed, but it also acknowledged that beyond stepping up diplomatic pressure on the Five Eyes to abide by privacy laws, there is not much that the European Union could do to evade their surveillance.

In its final report, the committee noted the following two features of the ECHELON surveillance network that is described as "unusual":

The first such feature attributed to it is the capacity to carry out quasi-total surveillance. Satellite receiver stations and spy satellites in particular are alleged to give it the ability to intercept any telephone, fax, Internet or e-mail message sent by any individual and thus to inspect its contents. The second unusual feature of ECHELON is said to be that the system operates worldwide on the basis of cooperation proportionate to their capabilities among several states (the UK, the United States, Canada, Australia and New Zealand), giving it an added value in comparison to national systems: the states participating in ECHELON (UKUSA states) can place their interception systems at each other’s disposal, share the cost and make joint use of the resulting information.

However, due to opposition from major political parties, the report failed to attract much public attention. Carlos Coelho, a Portuguese politician who served as the committee's chairman, remarked that "everyone has chosen to forget this report and its conclusions".

== Controversy ==
The committee was first proposed by the European Green Party. However, the original plan was scrapped due to opposition from major political groups in the European Parliament. According to critics, the committee has been unable to fully investigate the ECHELON system.

=== Premature cancellation of delegation trip ===
In May 2001, as the committee was finalizing its report on ECHELON, a delegation was sent to Washington, D.C. to investigate the surveillance network, with planned trips to meet U.S. officials from various government bodies including the following agencies and departments:

- U.S. Central Intelligence Agency (CIA)
- U.S. Department of Commerce (DOC)
- U.S. National Security Agency (NSA)

All meetings were cancelled by the U.S. government and the committee was forced to end its trip prematurely. According to a BBC correspondent, "the Americans deny the very existence of the network and, not surprisingly, cold-shouldered the EU delegation".

Several EU member states such as Britain and the Netherlands declined to contribute to the report and refused to co-operate with their parliaments to investigate the ECHELON system.

== See also ==
- Temporary Committee on the alleged use of European countries by the CIA for the transport and illegal detention of prisoners
