= Margarida Bentes Penedo =

Portuguese architect and politician (born 1966)

Member of the Lisbon Municipal Assembly
- In office 1 October 2017 – 12 October 2025

Personal details
- Born: Margarida Isabel Paulino Bentes Penedo; 6 February 1966 (age 60)
- Party: CH (since 2025)
- Other political affiliations: CDS–PP (until 2024); Independent (2024–2025)
- Children: 1
- Education: University of Lisbon
- Occupation: Architect • Politician

Margarida Isabel Paulino Bentes Penedo (born 6 February 1966) is a Portuguese architect and politician. In 2017 she was elected as a member of the Lisbon Municipal Assembly, as a member of the CDS – People's Party. She left the party in 2024 and joined Chega in 2025.
