= Ministry of State Reform =

Government ministry of Portugal

- Ministério da Reforma do Estado
- Logo of the Portuguese Government (Note: There is no official ministry logo yet)

Ministry overview
- Formed: 1978
- Jurisdiction: Government of Portugal
- Headquarters: Lisbon
- Minister responsible: Gonçalo Saraiva Matias, Minister of State Reform
- Website: portugal.gov.pt

The Ministry of State Reform is s a Portuguese government ministry, firstly created in 1978 by the II Constitutional Government, having had several designations ever since.

It is responsible for coordinating public administration reform policies with a view to modernising and reducing bureaucracy.

Currently, it is led by Gonçalo Saraiva Matias.

== Name ==
The ministry has been created with different names throughout history:

- Ministry of Administrative Reform – 30 January 1978 to 9 June 1983
- Ministry of State Reform and Public Administration– 25 October 1999 to 6 April 2002
- Ministry of Administrative Modernization – 30 October 2015 to 26 October 2019
- Ministry of State Modernization and Public Administration – 26 October 2019 to 30 March 2022
- Ministry of Modernization – 2 April 2024 to 5 June 2025
- Ministry of State Reform – 5 June 2025 to present

== List of ministers ==
Colour key
(for political parties)
Socialist Party (PS)
Social Democratic Party (PSD)
Democratic and Social Center (CDS)
Independent (Ind.)

#	Portrait	Name	Took office	Left office	Party	Prime Minister
		Rui Pena (1939–2018)	30 January 1978	29 August 1978	CDS	Mário Soares
–	Vacant office As Secretary of State: Carlos Robalo (1980–1981)		29 August 1978	9 January 1981		Alfredo Nobre da Costa
–	Vacant office As Secretary of State: Carlos Robalo (1980–1981)		29 August 1978	9 January 1981		Carlos Mota Pinto
–	Vacant office As Secretary of State: Carlos Robalo (1980–1981)		29 August 1978	9 January 1981		Maria de Lourdes Pintasilgo
–	Vacant office As Secretary of State: Carlos Robalo (1980–1981)		29 August 1978	9 January 1981		Francisco Sá Carneiro
–	Vacant office As Secretary of State: Carlos Robalo (1980–1981)		29 August 1978	9 January 1981		Diogo Freitas do Amaral
2		Eusébio Marques de Carvalho (b. 1945)	9 January 1981	4 June 1981	Ind.	Francisco Pinto Balsemão
	Vacant office As Secretary of State: José Robin de Andrade (1981)		4 June 1981	4 September 1981		Francisco Pinto Balsemão
3		José Menéres Pimentel (1928–2014)	4 September 1981	9 June 1983	PSD	Francisco Pinto Balsemão
–	Vacant office As Secretary of State: Isabel Corte Real (1987–1995)		9 June 1983	25 October 1999		Mário Soares
–	Vacant office As Secretary of State: Isabel Corte Real (1987–1995)		9 June 1983	25 October 1999		Aníbal Cavaco Silva
–	Vacant office As Secretary of State: Isabel Corte Real (1987–1995)		9 June 1983	25 October 1999		António Guterres
4		Alberto Martins (b. 1945)	25 October 1999	6 April 2002	PS	António Guterres
–	Vacant office As Secretary of State: Maria Manuel Leitão Marques (2005–2011); Joaquim Cardoso da Costa (2013–2015)		6 April 2002	30 October 2015		José Durão Barroso
–	Vacant office As Secretary of State: Maria Manuel Leitão Marques (2005–2011); Joaquim Cardoso da Costa (2013–2015)		6 April 2002	30 October 2015		Pedro Santana Lopes
–	Vacant office As Secretary of State: Maria Manuel Leitão Marques (2005–2011); Joaquim Cardoso da Costa (2013–2015)		6 April 2002	30 October 2015		José Sócrates
–	Vacant office As Secretary of State: Maria Manuel Leitão Marques (2005–2011); Joaquim Cardoso da Costa (2013–2015)		6 April 2002	30 October 2015		Pedro Passos Coelho
5		Rui Medeiros (b. 1963)	30 October 2015	26 November 2015	Ind.	Pedro Passos Coelho
6		Maria Manuel Leitão Marques (b. 1952)	26 November 2015	18 February 2019	PS	António Costa
7		Mariana Vieira da Silva (b. 1978)	18 February 2019	26 October 2019	PS	António Costa
8		Alexandra Leitão (b. 1973)	26 October 2019	30 March 2022	PS	António Costa
–	Vacant office As Secretary of State: Mário Campolargo (2022–2024)		30 March 2022	2 April 2024		António Costa
9		Margarida Balseiro Lopes (b. 1989)	2 April 2024	5 June 2025	PSD	Luís Montenegro
10		Gonçalo Saraiva Matias (b. 1979)	5 June 2025	present	PSD	Luís Montenegro
