= Nuno Simões de Melo =

Portuguese politician (born 1964)

Shadow Minister of National Defence
- Incumbent
- Assumed office 19 September 2025
- Leader: André Ventura
- Preceded by: Office established

Member of the Assembly of the Republic
- Incumbent
- Assumed office 26 March 2024
- Constituency: Guarda

Personal details
- Born: Carlos Nuno Gomes e Simões de Melo; 2 October 1964 (age 62) Lourenço Marques, Portuguese Mozambique, Portugal
- Party: CH (since 2023)
- Other political affiliations: IL (until 2023)
- Children: 5
- Education: Military Academy of Portugal; Instituto Superior Técnico
- Occupation: Colonel • Politician
- Awards: Medalha de Mérito Militar

Carlos Nuno Gomes e Simões de Melo (born 2 October 1964) is a Portuguese politician serving as a member of the Assembly of the Republic since 2024. He has served as shadow minister of national defence in the shadow cabinet of André Ventura since 2025.
