= Pedro Mota Soares =

Portuguese politician

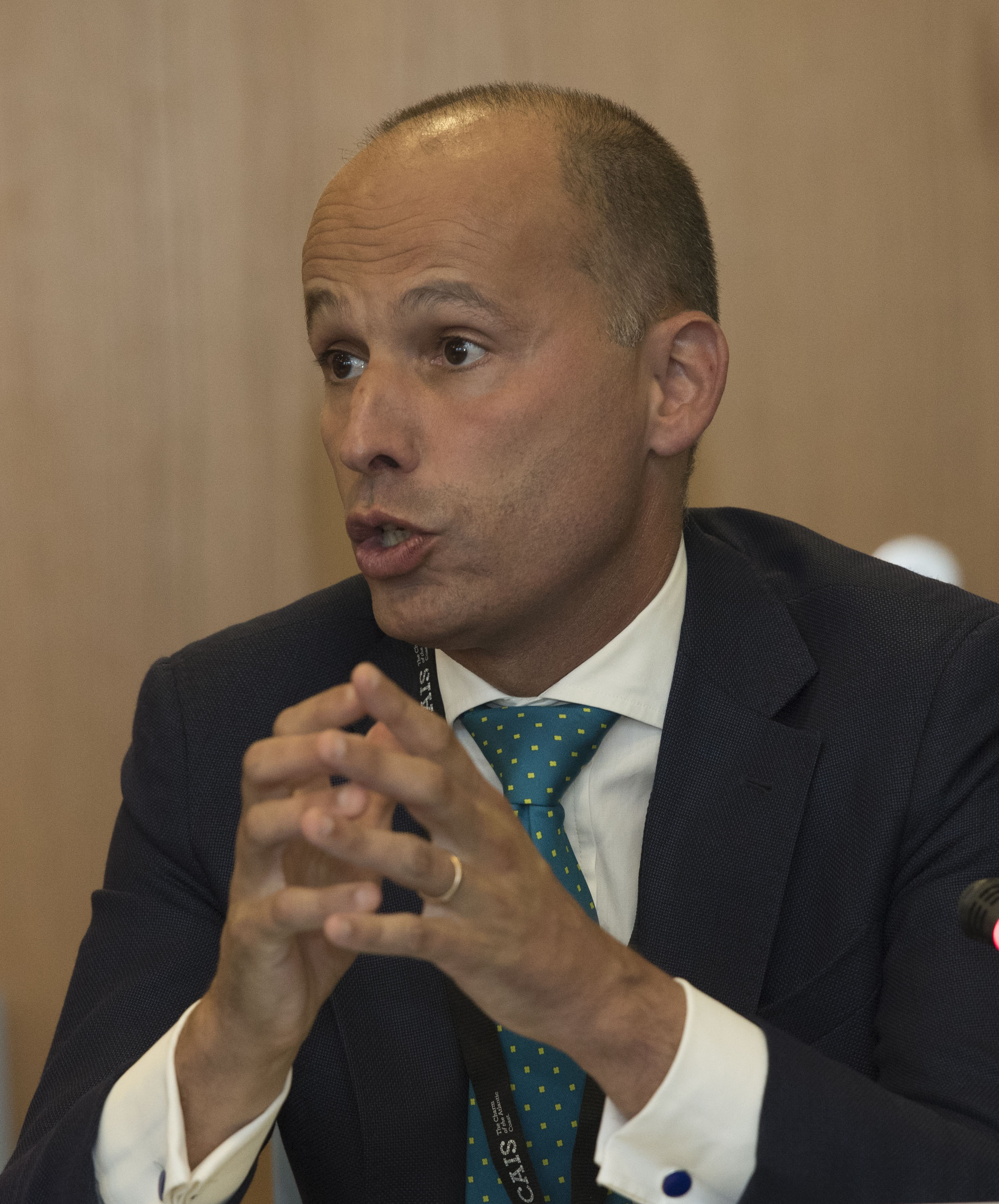

Member of the Assembly of the Republic
- In office 25 October 1999 – 25 October 2019
- Constituency: Lisbon (1999–2015); Porto (2015–2019)

Minister of Solidarity, Employment and Social Security
- In office 21 June 2011 – 26 November 2015
- Prime Minister: Pedro Passos Coelho
- Preceded by: Helena André
- Succeeded by: José António Vieira da Silva

Personal details
- Born: Luís Pedro Russo da Mota Soares; 29 May 1974 (age 52) Lisbon, Portugal
- Party: CDS-PP
- Children: 2
- Education: Universidade Lusófona

Luís Pedro Russo da Mota Soares (born 29 May 1974) is a Portuguese politician. He was the Portuguese Solidarity, Employment and Social Security Minister from 2011 to 2015 under Prime Minister Pedro Passos Coelho.

He is the President of the Municipal Assembly of Cascais.
