= Ministry of the Presidency =

Ministry of the Presidency may refer to:

- Ministry of the Presidency (Bolivia)
- Ministry General Secretariat of the Presidency (Chile)
- Ministry of the Presidency (Costa Rica)
- Ministry of the Presidency (Peru)
- Ministry of the Presidency (Spain)

- Superseded by the Ministry of the Presidency, Justice and Relations with the Cortes in 2023

- Ministry of the Presidency of the Council of Ministers (Timor-Leste)
