= Rui Medeiros =

Portuguese lawyer and politician (born 1963)

Minister of Administrative Modernisation
- In office 30 October 2015 – 26 November 2015
- Prime Minister: Pedro Passos Coelho
- Preceded by: Alberto Martins (as Minister of State Reform and Public Administration)
- Succeeded by: Maria Manuel Leitão Marques

Personal details
- Born: August 17, 1963 (age 62) Lisbon, Portugal
- Party: Independent
- Profession: Lawyer, Professor

Rui Pedro Costa Melo Medeiros (born 17 August 1963) is a Portuguese lawyer, university professor, and politician. He briefly served as Minister of Administrative Modernisation in 2015, in the XX Constitutional Government of Portugal.

== Early life and education ==
Medeiros was born in Lisbon on 17 August 1963. He earned a bachelor's degree (1987), master's degree (1991), and doctorate (1999) in Law from the Faculty of Law of the Catholic University of Portugal. His doctoral thesis focused on Constitutional Law and was titled A decisão de inconstitucionalidade (The decision of unconstitutionality).

== Academic career ==
Medeiros is a professor at the Faculty of Law of the Catholic University of Portugal. He previously served there as assistant and associate professor. He was the director of the Faculty of Law between 2002 and 2005.

He teaches courses in Introduction to Law and Constitutional law.

== Legal career ==
Medeiros specializes in Constitutional Law and Administrative Law and practices as a lawyer in these areas. He is an associate of the law firm Sérvulo & Associados, where he was managing partner between 2006 and 2011.

== Political career ==
In 2015, Medeiros briefly served as Minister of Administrative Modernisation in the XX Constitutional Government of Portugal, led by Pedro Passos Coelho.
