= General Union of Workers (Portugal) =

National trade union center in Portugal

UGT
- General Union of Workers
- União Geral de Trabalhadores
- Founded: October 1978
- Headquarters: Lisbon, Portugal
- Location: Portugal
- Members: 458,000
- Key people: Lucinda Dâmaso, president Carlos Silva, general secretary
- Affiliations: ITUC, ETUC
- Website: www.ugt.pt

The General Union of Workers (Portuguese: União Geral de Trabalhadores, UGT) is a national trade union center in Portugal. It was formed in 1978 and has a membership of 400,000. It is traditionally influenced by the Socialist Party.

The UGT is affiliated with the International Trade Union Confederation, and the European Trade Union Confederation.
