= Ministry of Labour, Solidarity and Social Security =

Government ministry of Portugal

- Ministério do Trabalho, Solidariedade e Segurança Social
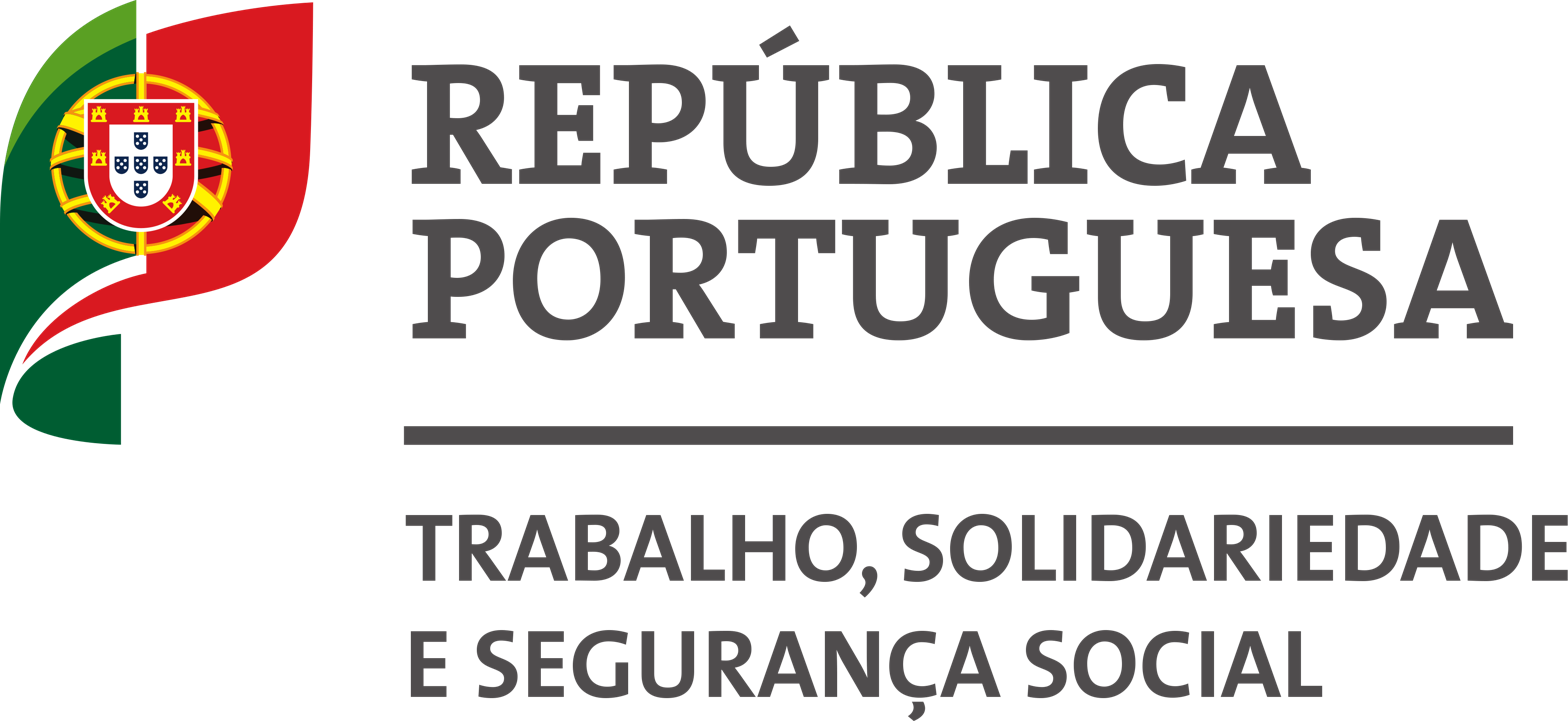
- Logo of the ministry

- Flag of the minister

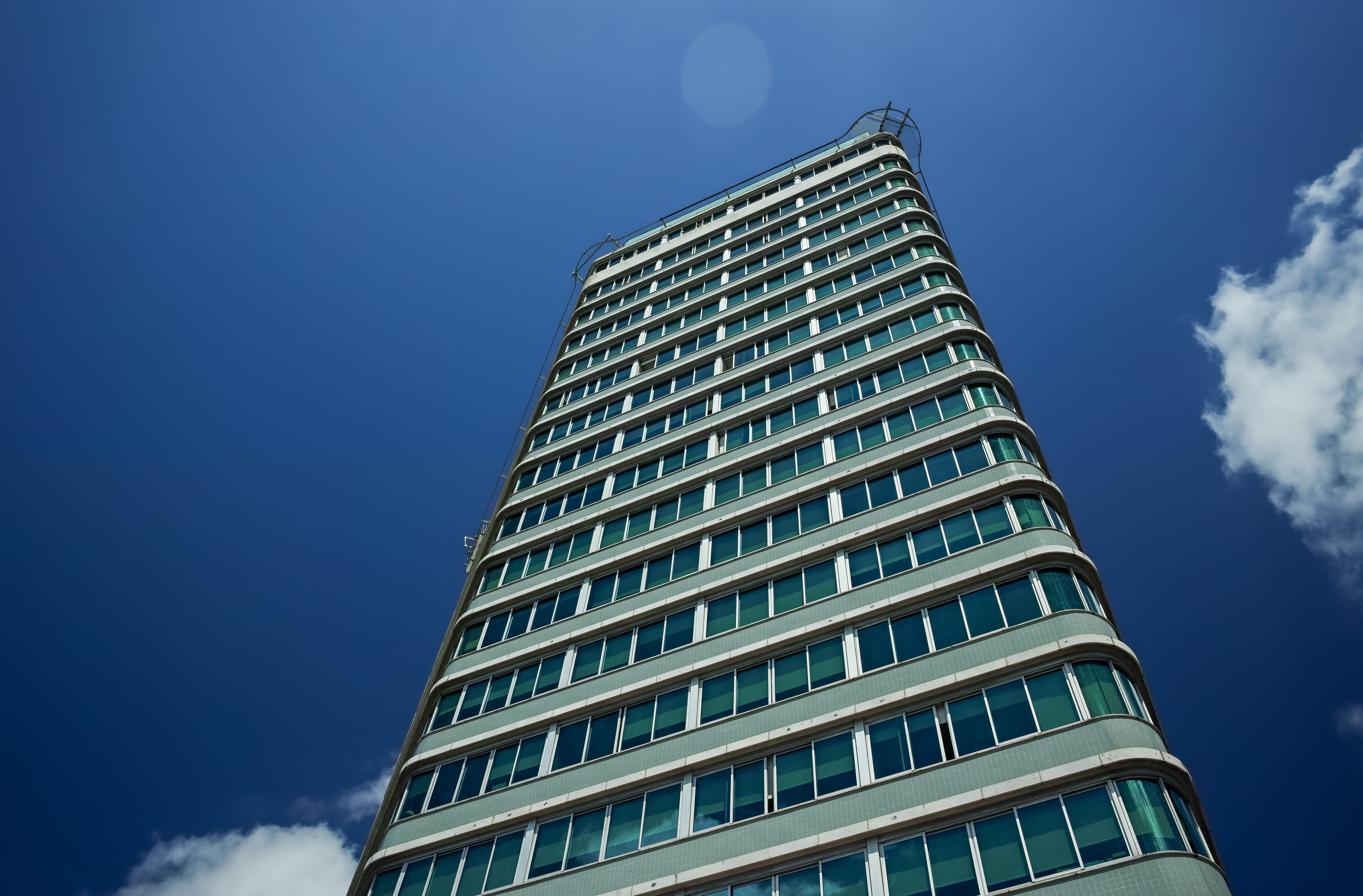
- Headquarters of the ministry in Lisbon

Ministry overview
- Formed: 2015
- Preceding Ministry: Ministry of Solidarity, Labour and Social Security
- Type: Ministry of labour
- Jurisdiction: Government of Portugal
- Headquarters: Praça de Londres, Lisbon, Portugal; 38°44′29.634″N 9°8′17.016″W
- Minister responsible: Maria do Rosário Palma Ramalho, Minister of Labour, Solidarity and Social Security
- Child Ministry: Social Security
- Website: portugal.gov.pt

Footnotes
- Created for the first time in 1916 as Ministry of Labour and Social Security

The Ministry of Labour, Solidarity and Social Security (Portuguese: Ministério do Trabalho, Solidariedade e Segurança Social or MTSS) is a Portuguese government ministry. The ministry has changed the scope of its responsibilities under various governments – for the purposes of this article, the focus is the core responsibility for "Labour", which has been termed "Employment" under some mandates, as responsibility for "Social Security" has been separated out in some mandates. The Portuguese term Solidariedade is roughly equivalent to "Technical or Vocational Training", ensuring that citizens have the "Qualification"s (a term also used) for employment in the trades. (see Solidarity (Polish trade union), Solidarity (South African trade union), Solidarity (British trade union))

The current Minister of Labour, Solidarity and Social Security in the XXIV Constitutional Government is Maria do Rosário Palma Ramalho, since 2 April 2024.

== List of ministers ==
- Francisco Marcelo Curto (1976–1977), Minister of Labour
- António Maldonado Gonelha (1977–1978), Minister of Labour
- António da Costa Leal (1978), Minister of Labour
- Eusébio Marques de Carvalho (1978–1979), Minister of Labour
- Jorge Sá Borges (1979–1980), Minister of Labour
- Eusébio Marques de Carvalho (1980–1981), Minister of Labour
- Henrique Nascimento Rodrigues (1981), Minister of Labour
- António Queirós Martins (1981–1982), Minister of Labour
- Luís Morales (1982–1983), Minister of Labour
- Amândio de Azevedo (1983–1985), Minister of Labour and Social Security
- Luís Mira Amaral (1985–1987), Minister of Labour and Social Security
- José Albino Silva Peneda (1987–1993), Minister for Employment and Social Security
- José Falcão e Cunha (1993–1995), Minister for Employment and Social Security
- Maria João Rodrigues (1995–1997), Minister for Qualification and Employment
- Eduardo Ferro Rodrigues (1997–2001), Minister of Labour and Solidarity
- Paulo Pedroso (2001–2002), Minister of Labour and Solidarity
- António Bagão Félix (2002–2004), Minister of Social Security and Labour
- Álvaro Barreto (2004–2005), Minister of State, Economic Activities and Labour
- José António Vieira da Silva (2005–2009), Minister of Labour and Social Security
- Helena André (2009–2011), Minister of Labour and Social Security
- Pedro Mota Soares (2011–2015)
  - 2011–2013, Minister of Solidarity and Social Security
  - 2013–2015, Minister of Solidarity, Employment and Social Security
- José António Vieira da Silva (2015–2019), Minister of Labour, Solidarity and Social Security
- Ana Mendes Godinho (2019–2024), Minister of Labour, Solidarity and Social Security
- Maria do Rosário Palma Ramalho (2024–), Minister of Labour, Solidarity and Social Security
