= Maria do Rosário Palma Ramalho =

Portuguese jurist and academic (born 1960)

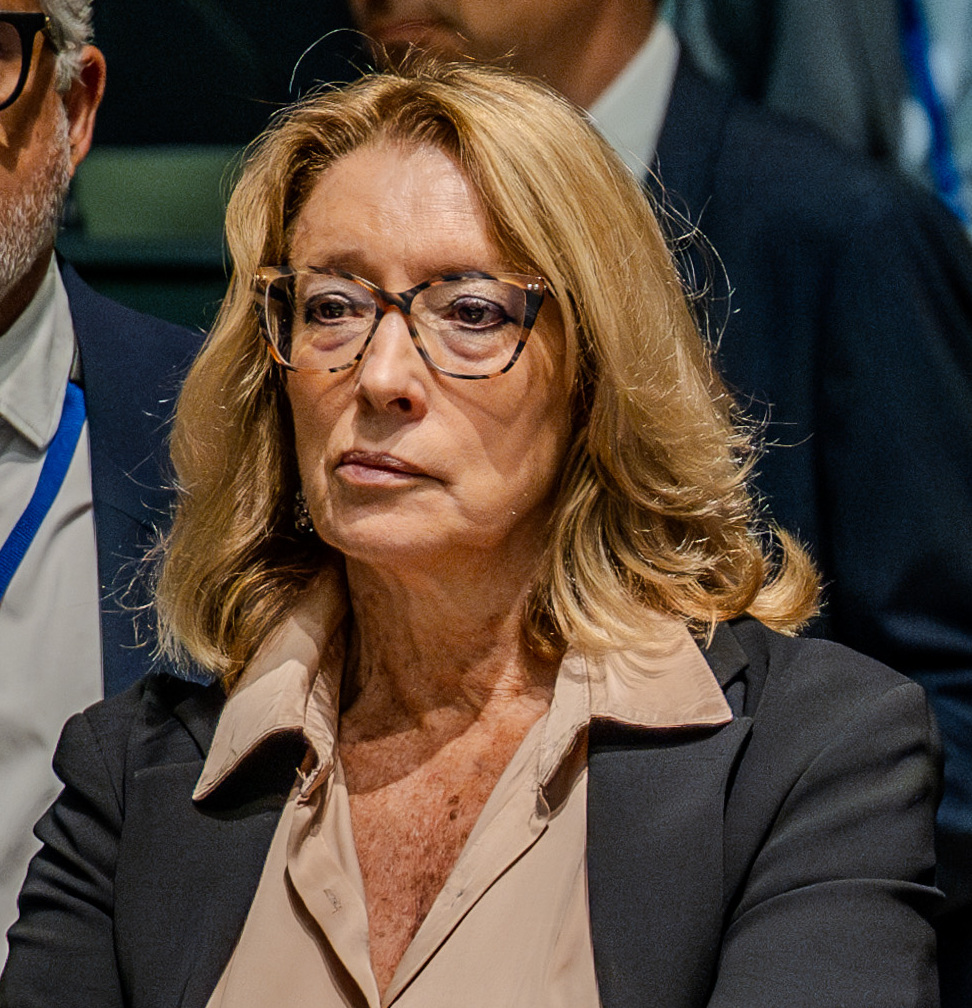
- Palma Ramalho in 2024

Minister of Labour, Solidarity and Social Security
- Incumbent
- Assumed office 2 April 2024
- Prime Minister: Luís Montenegro
- Preceded by: Ana Mendes Godinho

Personal details
- Born: Maria do Rosário Valente Rebelo Pinto; 18 September 1960 (age 66) Lisbon, Portugal
- Party: Independent
- Spouse: António Manuel Palma Ramalho (m. 1983)
- Children: 2
- Relatives: Margarida Rebelo Pinto (sister); Catarina Wallenstein (cousin); Pedro Granger (cousin)
- Education: Catholic University of Portugal; University of Lisbon
- Occupation: Jurist • Politician

Maria do Rosário Valente Rebelo Pinto Palma Ramalho (born 18 September 1960) is a Portuguese professor of law, and politician. She has been Minister of Labour, Solidarity and Social Security since 2024, in the XXIV Constitutional Government, led by Luís Montenegro.

== Biography ==
Rosário Palma Ramalho holds a degree in Law from the Faculty of Law of the Universidade Católica Portuguesa and received her master's and doctorate from the Faculty of Law of the University of Lisbon.

She is a professor at the Faculty of Law of the University of Lisbon, a position she was appointed to in 2010. She was also scientific coordinator of several international projects, in the areas of Labour Law and Equality Law, and, in this context, consultant for the European Commission, the European Parliament and the International Labour Organization. She has been a visiting professor at a number of universities nationally and internationally, including in Brazil, Spain, Netherlands, Czech Republic, Italy and Angola.

Rosário Palma Ramalho was President of the Portuguese Association of Labour Law (APODIT) from 2013 to 2024.

Rosário Palma Ramalho has been Minister of Labour, Solidarity and Social Security since 2024, in the XXIV Constitutional Government, led by Luís Montenegro. She has responded to a challenge by Portuguese President Marcelo Rebelo de Sousa to produce a strategy to deal with Portugal’s increasing numbers of homeless people.

== Personal life ==
Rosário Palma Ramalho’s husband is António Ramalho, formerly the executive president of Novo Banco.
