= General Confederation of the Portuguese Workers =

Portuguese trade union

CGTP–IN
- General Confederation of the Portuguese Workers
- Confederação Geral dos Trabalhadores Portugueses
- Founded: 1970
- Headquarters: Lisbon, Portugal
- Location: Portugal
- Members: 550,000
- Key people: Tiago Oliveira, General Secretary
- Affiliations: ETUC
- Website: www.cgtp.pt

The General Confederation of the Portuguese Workers (Portuguese: Confederação Geral dos Trabalhadores Portugueses, CGTP) is the largest trade union federation in Portugal. It was founded informally in 1970, emerged publicly after the Carnation Revolution in 1974 and was legalised the following year by the National Salvation Junta.

== Affiliates ==
- National Union of Local Administration Workers - STAL Lisbon
- Telecommunications and Audiovisual Communication Workers Union - STT Lisbon
- Union of Customs Workers in Brokers and Companies Lisbon
- Union of Agricultural Workers and the Food, Beverage and Tobacco Industries of Portugal - SINTAB Lisbon
- Union of Technical Agents of Architecture and Engineering - SATAE Lisbon
- Union of Financial Activity Workers - SINTAF Lisbon
- Union of Aviation and Airport Workers - SIAVA Lisbon
- Union of Workers of Caixa Geral de Depósitos Group Companies - STEC Lisbon
- Union of Captains, Officers, Pilots, Commissioners and Engineers of the Merchant Marine - OFFICIALMAR Lisbon
- Southern Meat Industry Workers Union Lisbon
- Union of Workers in the Ceramic, Cement and Similar Industries of the South and Autonomous Regions Lisbon
- Union of Commerce Workers, Offices and Services of Portugal - CESP Lisbon
- Union of Construction, Timber, Marble and Cork Workers of the South Lisbon
- National Union of Postal and Telecommunications Workers - SNTCT Lisbon
- National Union of Electrical Industries of the South and Islands - SIESI Lisbon
- Portuguese Nurses Union - SEP Lisbon
- Show Workers Union - STE Lisbon
- Union of Civil Workers of the Armed Forces, Manufacturing Establishments and Defense Companies - STEFFA'S Lisbon
- National Union of Railway Sector Workers - SNTSF Lisbon
- Union of Public Service Workers of the South and Azores - STFPSA Lisbon
- Union of Judicial Employees - SFJ Lisbon
- Union of Workers in the Industry of Hospitality, Tourism, Restaurants and Similar in the South Lisbon
- Professional Football Players Union Lisbon
- Union of Merchant Marine Workers, Travel Agencies, Freight Forwarders and Fisheries - SIMAMEVIP Lisbon
- South Zone Physicians Union Lisbon
- National Union of Veterinarians Lisbon
- Union of Workers in Manufacturing Industries, Energy and Environmental Activities in the Centre, South and Autonomous Regions - SITE CSRA Lisbon
- Mining Industry Workers Union Lisbon
- Lisbon Municipality Workers Union - STML Lisbon
- Musicians Union Lisbon
- Free Trade Union of Fishermen and Related Professions Lisbon
- Union of Concierge, Surveillance, Cleaning, Household and Miscellaneous Activities Workers Lisbon
- Greater Lisbon Teachers Union - SPGL Lisbon
- National Psychologists Union Lisbon
- Union of Drawing Staff and Technicians - SQTD Lisbon
- National Union of Telecommunications and Audiovisual Workers - SINTTAV Lisbon
- Textile, Wool, Clothing, Footwear and Leatherworkers Union of the South Lisbon
- Union of River, Coastal and Merchant Marine Transport Lisbon
- Union of Road and Urban Transport Workers of Portugal - STRUP Lisbon
- Union of Electrical Industries of the South and Islands - SIESI Lisbon
- Union of Workers in the Footwear, Bags and Related Industries of the Districts of Aveiro and Coimbra
- Union of Northern Cork Workers
- Union of Dairy Professionals
- Union of Workers of the Transforming Industries, Energy and Environmental Activities of the Center North - SITE CN
- Aveiro Textile Sector Workers Union
- Union of Footwear, Bags and Related Products, Components, Shapes and Tanneries of Minho and Trás-os-Montes
- Trade Workers Union, Offices and Services of Minho
- Union of Construction, Timber, Marble, Quarry, Ceramic and Related Workers, North Region of the Douro River
- Baga District Tanning Industry Workers Union
- Union of Workers in the Industry and Trade of Bakery, Milling, Confectionery, Pastry and Similar in Minho
- Textile Union of Minho and Trás-os-Montes
- Northern Clothing, Apparel and Textile Workers Union
- Beira Baixa Textile Sector Workers Union
- Union of Workers in the Ceramic, Cement, Construction, Wood, Marble and Similar Industries of the Central Region
- Union of Workers in Public and Social Functions of the Centre
- Union of Workers in the Hospitality, Tourism, Restaurants and Similar Industry of the Centre
- Zona Centro Doctors Union - SMZC
- Fishermen's Union of the District of Coimbra
- Union of Teachers of the Center Region - SPRC
- Union of Textile, Wool and Clothing Workers of the Centre
- South Zone Teachers Union - SPZS
- Union of Workers in the Canning Industry and Related Crafts of the District of FARO
- Union of Workers in the Algarve Hotel, Tourism, Restaurant and Similar Industry
- Southern Fisheries Workers Union
- Union of Textile Sector Workers of Beira Alta
- Center Fisheries Workers Union
- Glass Industry Workers Union
- Union of Cork Workers of the District of Portalegre
- Northern Food Industry Workers Union - STIANOR
- National Union of Workers in the Beverage Industry and Commerce
- Northern Meat Workers Union
- Union of Workers in the Ceramics, Cement and Similar Industries of the North Region
- Union of Health Sciences and Technologies
- Union of Construction Workers, Timber, Marble, Quarry, Ceramics and Construction Materials of Portugal
- Trade Union of Tannery Industry Workers
- Union of Stoves, Energy and Manufacturing Industries - SIFOMATE
- Northern Civil Service Workers Union - STFPN
- Northern Hospitality, Tourism, Restaurants and Similar Industry Workers Union
- Northern Doctors Union
- Northern Manufacturing, Energy and Environmental Activities Workers Union - SITE NORTE
- Northern Fisheries Workers Union
- Northern Teachers Union - SPN
- Union of Health, Solidarity and Social Security Workers
- Union of Workers in the Textile, Clothing, Footwear and Tannery Sectors of the District of Porto - SINTEVECC
- Union of Transport Workers of the Metropolitan Area of Porto
- Northern Road and Urban Transport Workers Union - STRUN
- National Union of Professionals in the Industry and Trade of Clothing and Textiles - SINPICVAT
- Union of Food Industry Workers of the Centre, South and Islands
- National Union of Workers in the Tanning Industry and Related Trades of the District of Santarém
- Portuguese Physiotherapists Union
- Union of Workers of Manufacturing Industries, Energy and Environmental Activities of the South - SITE SUL
- Union of Civil Construction, Timber, Marble and Quarry Workers of the District of Viana do Castelo
- Union of Workers of the Metallurgical and Metalworking Industries of the District of Viana do Castelo
- National Union of Funchal Warehouse Professionals
- Free Union of Workers in the Embroidery, Tapestry, Textile and Handicraft Industry of the Autonomous Region of Madeira
- Union of CONSTRUCTION, Timber, Pottery and Related Workers of the Autonomous Region of Madeira - SICOMA
- Union of Workers in the Electric Energy Production, Transport and Distribution Sector of the Autonomous Region of Madeira - STEEM
- Union of Nurses of the Autonomous Region of Madeira - SERAM
- Union of Office, Commerce and Services Workers of the Autonomous Region of Madeira - SITAM
- Union of Civil Service Workers of the Autonomous Region of Madeira - STFP-RAM
- Union of workers in the HOSPITALITY, Tourism, Food, Services and Similar of the Autonomous Region of Madeira
- Madeira Teachers Union - SPM
- Union of Road Workers and Metallurgical Activities of the Autonomous Region of Madeira
- Azores Region Teachers Union - SPRA
- Azores Food, Beverage and Similar, Commerce, Office and Services Workers Union - SABCES
- Horta Civil Construction Union
- Union of Office, Commerce and Services Employees of Horta
- Union of Transport, Tourism and other Horta Professionals
- Free Trade Union of Maritime Fishermen and Related Professionals of the Azores
- Union of Professionals from the Manufacturing Industries of the Islands of São Miguel and Santa Maria
- Transport, Tourism and Other Services Professionals Union of São Miguel and Santa Maria
- Teachers Abroad Union

== General Secretaries ==
1974: Francisco Canais Rocha
1974: Post vacant
1977: Armando Artur Teixeira da Silva
1986: Manuel Carvalho da Silva
2012: Arménio Carlos
2020: Isabel Camarinha
2024: Tiago Oliveira
