= Cavaco Silva's Cabinets (1985–1995) =

Former Prime Minister of Portugal

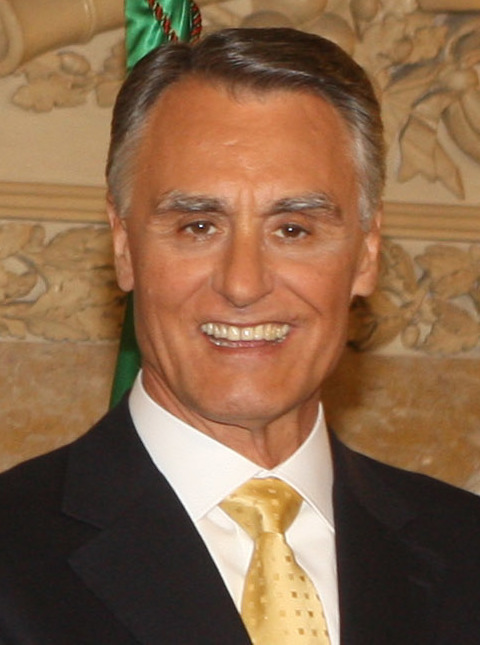
Cavaco Silva in 2007. He was Prime Minister of Portugal from 1985 to 1995 and President from 2006 to 2016.

Aníbal Cavaco Silva served as Prime Minister of Portugal from November 1985 to October 1995. He became prime minister after serving as president of the Conservative Social Democratic Party (PSD) since May 1985. For almost all of his 10 years as prime minister, Cavaco Silva ruled in cohabitation with President Mário Soares (which came from the centre-left Socialist Party). The 10-year period during which Cavaco Silva led the government is often dubbed Cavaquismo in Portuguese, which could be translated as Cavacoism .

The decade in power of Cavaco Silva was mostly marked by robust economic growth and socio-economic development which allowed for the modernization of the economy and an unprecedented convergence of the Portuguese GDP per capita and standards of living with the average of Western Europe. Led by Cavaco Silva, PSD achieved its first absolute majority in the 1987 election and a second one in 1991. Cavaco Silva's third term in office (1991–95) was not as successful: from 1992 to 1995 Portugal endured an economic crisis (owing to the effects of the cambial crisis of the European Exchange Rate Mechanism). The third government of Cavaco Silva was also marked by highly controversial measures such as a significant hike in university tuition fees (which led to major student protests), the 50% increase in the toll fees of 25 de Abril Bridge (which led to one of the biggest demonstrations since 25 de Abril revolution, the blockade of the Bridge on 24 June 1994) and the continuation of construction of the controversial Foz Côa Dam. Economic growth resumed in 1995, but the relationship of Portuguese people with Cavaco Silva was not the same that had given him an absolute majority four years before.

In February 1995, Cavaco Silva stepped down as leader of PSD and chose not to run for a fourth term as prime minister in the October 1995 parliamentary election, remaining silent about a candidacy for President of Portugal in the January 1996 presidential election. Cavaco Silva's Minister of Defense Fernando Nogueira was chosen to succeed him as leader of PSD and to lead the party in the parliamentary election. Nogueira-led PSD lost the parliamentary election to the Socialist Party and António Guterres became prime minister. In October 1995, Cavaco Silva announced he would be candidate in the 1996 presidential election. He eventually lost the election to Socialist Jorge Sampaio. Cavaco Silva retired from politics for a decade: he contested and won the 2006 presidential election becoming President of Portugal. He was re-elected in 2011, serving as President of Portugal from 2006 to 2016.

== X - XI - XII Constitutional Governments ==
The first Cabinet was sworn in on 6 November 1985, with parliamentary minority; the second on 17 August 1987, and the last on 31 October 1991, both with absolute majority. The former would last until 28 October 1995.

Ministry	Incumbent	Term
State and Internal Administration (Internal Administration 17 August 1987 – 28 October 1995)	Eurico de Melo	6 November 1985 – 17 August 1987
State and Internal Administration (Internal Administration 17 August 1987 – 28 October 1995)	José Silveira Godinho	17 August 1987 – 5 January 1990
State and Internal Administration (Internal Administration 17 August 1987 – 28 October 1995)	Manuel Pereira	5 January 1990 – 31 October 1991
State and Internal Administration (Internal Administration 17 August 1987 – 28 October 1995)	Manuel Dias Loureiro	31 October 1991 – 28 October 1995
Deputy and Parliamentary Affairs (Parliamentary Affairs 17 August 1987 – 31 October 1991) (Deputy 19 March 1992 – 28 October 1995)	Fernando Nogueira	6 November 1985 – 17 August 1987
Deputy and Parliamentary Affairs (Parliamentary Affairs 17 August 1987 – 31 October 1991) (Deputy 19 March 1992 – 28 October 1995)	António Capucho	17 August 1987 – 24 July 1989
Deputy and Parliamentary Affairs (Parliamentary Affairs 17 August 1987 – 31 October 1991) (Deputy 19 March 1992 – 28 October 1995)	Manuel Dias Loureiro	24 July 1989 – 31 October 1991
Deputy and Parliamentary Affairs (Parliamentary Affairs 17 August 1987 – 31 October 1991) (Deputy 19 March 1992 – 28 October 1995)	António Couto dos Santos	31 October 1991 – 19 March 1992
Deputy and Parliamentary Affairs (Parliamentary Affairs 17 August 1987 – 31 October 1991) (Deputy 19 March 1992 – 28 October 1995)	Luís Marques Mendes	19 March 1992 – 28 October 1995
Defense (Vice Prime-Minister and Defense 17 August 1987 – 5 January 1990) (Presidency and Defense 5 March 1990 – 16 March 1995)	Leonardo Ribeiro de Almeida	6 November 1985 – 17 August 1987
Defense (Vice Prime-Minister and Defense 17 August 1987 – 5 January 1990) (Presidency and Defense 5 March 1990 – 16 March 1995)	Eurico de Melo	17 August 1987 – 5 January 1990
Defense (Vice Prime-Minister and Defense 17 August 1987 – 5 January 1990) (Presidency and Defense 5 March 1990 – 16 March 1995)	Carlos Brito	5 January 1990 – 5 March 1990
Defense (Vice Prime-Minister and Defense 17 August 1987 – 5 January 1990) (Presidency and Defense 5 March 1990 – 16 March 1995)	Fernando Nogueira	5 March 1990 – 16 March 1995
Defense (Vice Prime-Minister and Defense 17 August 1987 – 5 January 1990) (Presidency and Defense 5 March 1990 – 16 March 1995)	António Figueiredo Lopes	16 March 1995 – 28 October 1995
Foreign Affairs	Pedro Pires de Miranda	6 November 1985 – 17 August 1987
Foreign Affairs	João de Deus Pinheiro	17 August 1987 – 12 November 1992
Foreign Affairs	José Manuel Durão Barroso	12 November 1992 – 28 October 1995
Finances	Miguel José Ribeiro Cadilhe	6 November 1985 – 5 January 1990
Finances	Miguel Beleza	5 January 1990 – 31 October 1991
Finances	Jorge Braga de Macedo	31 October 1991 – 7 December 1993
Finances	Eduardo Catroga	7 December 1993 – 28 October 1995
Justice (Presidency and Justice 17 August 1987 – 5 March 1990)	Mário Raposo	6 November 1985 – 17 August 1987
Justice (Presidency and Justice 17 August 1987 – 5 March 1990)	Fernando Nogueira	17 August 1987 – 5 March 1990
Justice (Presidency and Justice 17 August 1987 – 5 March 1990)	Laborinho Lúcio	5 March 1990 – 28 October 1995
Planning and Territorial Administration	Luís Valente de Oliveira	6 November 1985 – 28 October 1995
Agriculture, Fishings and Food (Agriculture 31 October 1991 – 16 March 1995) (Agriculture and Sea 16 March 1995 – 28 October 1995)	Álvaro Barreto	6 November 1985 – 5 January 1990
Agriculture, Fishings and Food (Agriculture 31 October 1991 – 16 March 1995) (Agriculture and Sea 16 March 1995 – 28 October 1995)	Arlindo Cunha	5 January 1990 – 21 May 1994
Agriculture, Fishings and Food (Agriculture 31 October 1991 – 16 March 1995) (Agriculture and Sea 16 March 1995 – 28 October 1995)	António Duarte Silva	21 May 1994 – 28 October 1995
Industry and Trade (Industry and Energy 17 August 1987 – 28 October 1995)	Fernando Santos Martins	6 November 1985 – 17 August 1987
Industry and Trade (Industry and Energy 17 August 1987 – 28 October 1995)	Luís Mira Amaral	17 August 1987 – 28 October 1995
Education and Culture (Education 17 August 1987 – 28 October 1995)	João de Deus Pinheiro	6 November 1985 – 17 August 1987
Education and Culture (Education 17 August 1987 – 28 October 1995)	Roberto Carneiro	17 August 1987 – 31 October 1991
Education and Culture (Education 17 August 1987 – 28 October 1995)	Diamantino Durão	31 October 1991 – 19 March 1992
Education and Culture (Education 17 August 1987 – 28 October 1995)	António Couto dos Santos	19 March 1992 – 7 December 1993
Education and Culture (Education 17 August 1987 – 28 October 1995)	Manuela Ferreira Leite	7 December 1993 – 28 October 1995
Public Works, Transports and Communications	João Maria Oliveira Martins	6 November 1985 – 24 April 1990
Public Works, Transports and Communications	Joaquim Ferreira do Amaral	24 April 1990 – 28 October 1995
Health	Leonor Beleza	6 November 1985 – 5 January 1990
Health	Arlindo de Carvalho	5 January 1990 – 7 December 1993
Health	Paulo Mendo	7 December 1993 – 28 October 1995
Labour and Social Security (Employment and Social Security 17 August 1987 – 28 October 1995)	Luís Mira Amaral	6 November 1985 – 17 August 1987
Labour and Social Security (Employment and Social Security 17 August 1987 – 28 October 1995)	José Silva Peneda	17 August 1987 – 7 December 1993
Labour and Social Security (Employment and Social Security 17 August 1987 – 28 October 1995)	José Falcão e Cunha	7 December 1993 – 28 October 1995
Trade and Tourism	Joaquim Ferreira do Amaral	17 August 1987 – 24 April 1990
Trade and Tourism	Fernando Faria de Oliveira	24 April 1990 – 28 October 1995
Deputy for Youth	António Couto dos Santos	17 August 1987 – 31 October 1991
Environment and Natural Resources	Fernando Real	5 January 1990 – 24 April 1991
Environment and Natural Resources	Carlos Borrego	24 April 1991 – 11 June 1993
Environment and Natural Resources	Teresa Gouveia	11 June 1993 – 28 October 1995
Sea	Eduardo Azevedo Soares	31 October 1991 – 16 March 1995
