= XII Constitutional Government of Portugal =

Cabinet of Portugal between 1991 and 1995, led by Aníbal Cavaco Silva

- Cabinet of Portugal

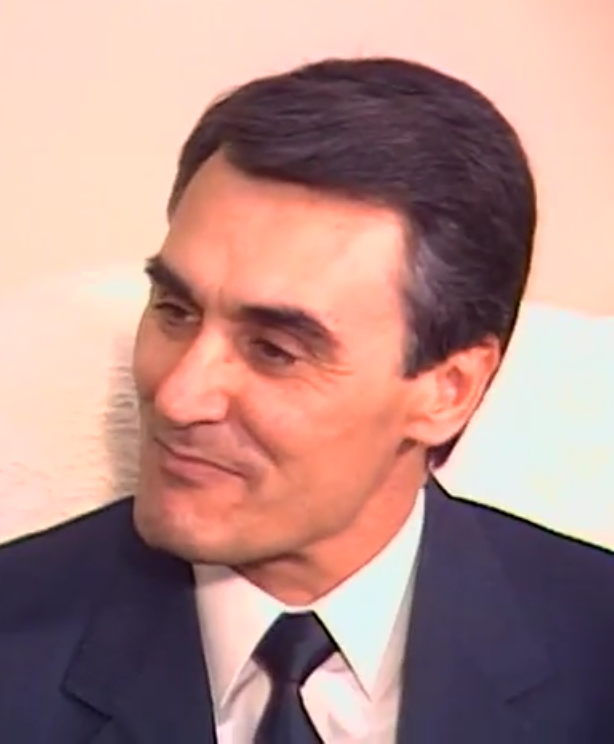
- Prime Minister Aníbal Cavaco Silva
- Date formed: 31 October 1991
- Date dissolved: 28 October 1995

People and organisations
- President of the Republic: Mário Soares
- Prime Minister: Aníbal Cavaco Silva
- Member party: Social Democratic Party (PSD)
- Status in legislature: Majority
- Opposition parties: Socialist Party (PS); Portuguese Communist Party (PCP); Democratic and Social Center (CDS); Ecologist Party "The Greens" (PEV); National Solidarity Party (PSN)

History
- Elections: 1991 Portuguese legislative election (6 October 1991)
- Predecessor: XI Constitutional Government of Portugal
- Successor: XIII Constitutional Government of Portugal

The XII Constitutional Government of Portugal (Portuguese: XII Governo Constitucional de Portugal) was the 12th government of the Third Portuguese Republic, in office from 31 October 1991 to 28 October 1995. It was formed by members of the Social Democratic Party (PSD) and had Aníbal Cavaco Silva, leader of the PSD, as Prime Minister.

== Party breakdown ==
Party breakdown of cabinet ministers by the end of the government's time in office: (Prime Minister not included)

- Social Democratic Party
- Independents
17
2

== Composition ==
The government was composed of the Prime Minister and 17 ministries comprising ministers, secretaries and under-secretaries of state. The government also included the Ministers of the Republic for the Autonomous Regions of Azores and Madeira.

Ministers of the XII Constitutional Government of Portugal
Office	Minister	Party	Start of term	End of term
Prime Minister	Aníbal Cavaco Silva	PSD	31 October 1991	28 October 1995
Minister of Presidency	Fernando Nogueira	PSD	31 October 1991	28 October 1995
Minister of National Defense	Fernando Nogueira	PSD	31 October 1991	16 March 1995
Minister of National Defense	António Figueiredo Lopes	PSD	16 March 1995	28 October 1995
Assistant Minister to the Prime Minister and of Parliamentary Affairs	António Couto dos Santos	PSD	31 October 1991	19 March 1992
Assistant Minister to the Prime Minister	Luís Marques Mendes	PSD	19 March 1992	28 October 1995
Minister of Internal Administration	Manuel Dias Loureiro	PSD	31 October 1991	28 October 1995
Minister of Finance	Jorge Braga de Macedo	PSD	31 October 1991	7 December 1993
Minister of Finance	Eduardo Catroga	PSD	7 December 1993	28 October 1995
Minister of Plan and Territorial Administration	Luís Valente de Oliveira	PSD	31 October 1991	28 October 1995
Minister of Justice	Álvaro Laborinho Lúcio	PSD	31 October 1991	28 October 1995
Minister of Foreign Affairs	João de Deus Pinheiro	PSD	31 October 1991	12 November 1992
Minister of Foreign Affairs	José Manuel Durão Barroso	PSD	12 November 1992	28 October 1995
Minister of Agriculture	Arlindo Cunha	PSD	31 October 1991	21 May 1994
Minister of Agriculture	António Duarte Silva	PSD	21 May 1994	28 October 1995
Minister of Industry and Energy	Luís Mira Amaral	Independent	31 October 1991	28 October 1995
Minister of Education	Diamantino Durão	Independent	31 October 1991	19 March 1992
Minister of Education	António Couto dos Santos	PSD	19 March 1992	7 December 1993
Minister of Education	Manuela Ferreira Leite	PSD	7 December 1993	28 October 1995
Minister of Public Works, Transports and Communications	Joaquim Ferreira do Amaral	PSD	31 October 1991	28 October 1995
Minister of Health	Arlindo de Carvalho	PSD	31 October 1991	7 December 1993
Minister of Health	Paulo Mendo	PSD	7 December 1993	28 October 1995
Minister of Labour and Social Security	José Silva Peneda	PSD	31 October 1991	7 December 1993
Minister of Labour and Social Security	José Falcão e Cunha	PSD	7 December 1993	28 October 1995
Minister of Commerce and Tourism	Fernando Faria de Oliveira	PSD	31 October 1991	28 October 1995
Minister of the Environment and Natural Resources	Carlos Borrego	Independent	31 October 1991	11 June 1993
Minister of the Environment and Natural Resources	Teresa Gouveia	PSD	11 June 1993	28 October 1995
Minister of the Sea	Eduardo Azevedo Soares	PSD	31 October 1991	16 March 1995
Minister of the Sea	António Duarte Silva	PSD	16 March 1995	28 October 1995
Minister of the Republic for the Autonomous Region of Azores	Mário Pinto	PSD	31 October 1991	28 October 1995
Minister of the Republic for the Autonomous Region of Madeira	Artur Rodrigues Consolado	Independent	31 October 1991	28 October 1995
