= XI Constitutional Government of Portugal =

Cabinet of Portugal between 1987 and 1991, led by Aníbal Cavaco Silva

- Cabinet of Portugal

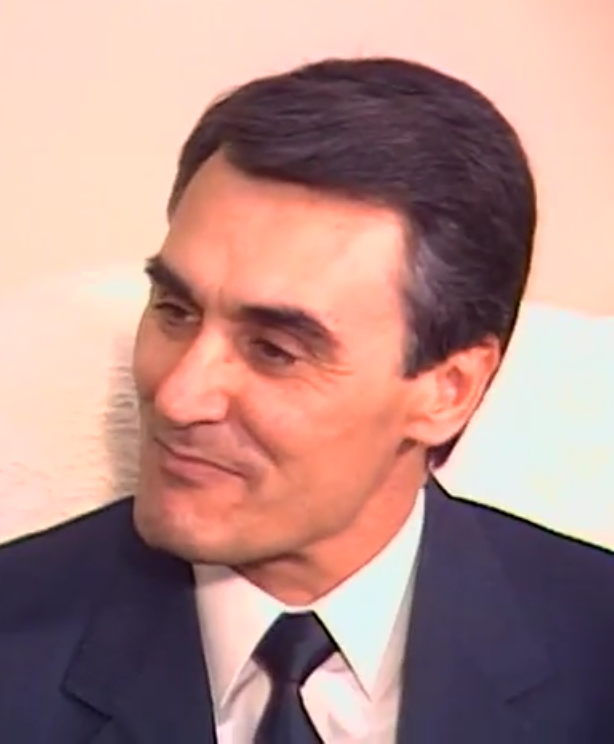
- Prime Minister Aníbal Cavaco Silva
- Date formed: 17 August 1987
- Date dissolved: 31 October 1991

People and organisations
- President of the Republic: Mário Soares
- Prime Minister: Aníbal Cavaco Silva
- Deputy Prime Minister: Eurico de Melo
- Member party: Social Democratic Party (PSD)
- Status in legislature: Majority
- Opposition parties: Socialist Party (PS); Portuguese Communist Party (PCP); Democratic Renewal Party (PNR); Democratic and Social Center (CDS); Ecologist Party "The Greens" (PEV)

History
- Elections: 1987 Portuguese legislative election (19 July 1987)
- Predecessor: X Constitutional Government of Portugal
- Successor: XII Constitutional Government of Portugal

The XI Constitutional Government of Portugal (Portuguese: XI Governo Constitucional de Portugal) was the 11th government of the Third Portuguese Republic, in office from 17 August 1987 to 31 October 1991. It was formed by members of the Social Democratic Party (PSD) and had Aníbal Cavaco Silva, leader of the PSD, as Prime Minister. It was the first single-party government with an absolute majority in the Assembly of the Republic since the Carnation Revolution.

== Party breakdown ==
Party breakdown of cabinet ministers by the end of the government's time in office: (Prime Minister not included)

- Social Democratic Party
- Independents
16
2

== Composition ==
The government was initially composed of the Prime Minister, one Deputry Prime Minister, and 16 ministries comprising ministers, secretaries and under-secretaries of state. On 5 January 1990, the position of Vice Prime Minister was extinguished and the Ministry of Environment and Natural Resources was created, making a total of 17 ministries. The government also included the Ministers of the Republic for the Autonomous Regions of Azores and Madeira.

Ministers of the XI Constitutional Government of Portugal
Office	Minister	Party	Start of term	End of term
Prime Minister	Aníbal Cavaco Silva	PSD	17 August 1987	31 October 1991
Deputy Prime Minister	Eurico de Melo	PSD	17 August 1987	5 January 1990
Minister of Presidency	Fernando Nogueira	PSD	17 August 1987	31 October 1991
Minister of National Defense	Eurico de Melo	PSD	17 August 1987	5 January 1990
Minister of National Defense	Carlos Brito	PSD	5 January 1990	5 March 1990
Minister of National Defense	Fernando Nogueira	PSD	5 March 1990	31 October 1991
Minister of Parliamentary Affairs	António Capucho	PSD	17 August 1987	24 July 1989
Minister of Parliamentary Affairs	Manuel Dias Loureiro	PSD	24 July 1989	31 October 1991
Minister of Finance	Miguel Cadilhe	PSD	17 August 1987	5 January 1990
Minister of Finance	Miguel Beleza	PSD	5 January 1990	31 October 1991
Minister of Plan and Territorial Administration	Luís Valente de Oliveira	PSD	17 August 1987	31 October 1991
Minister of Internal Administration	José Silveira Godinho	PSD	17 August 1987	5 January 1990
Minister of Internal Administration	Manuel Pereira	PSD	5 January 1990	31 October 1991
Minister of Justice	Fernando Nogueira	PSD	5 March 1990	5 March 1990
Minister of Justice	Álvaro Laborinho Lúcio	PSD	5 March 1990	31 October 1991
Minister of Foreign Affairs	João de Deus Pinheiro	PSD	17 August 1987	31 October 1991
Minister of Agriculture, Fisheries and Food	Álvaro Barreto	PSD	17 August 1987	5 January 1990
Minister of Agriculture, Fisheries and Food	Arlindo Cunha	PSD	5 January 1990	31 October 1991
Minister of Industry and Energy	Luís Mira Amaral	PSD	17 August 1987	31 October 1991
Minister of Education	Roberto Carneiro	Independent	17 August 1987	31 October 1991
Minister of Public Works, Transports and Communications	João Maria Oliveira Martins	PSD	17 August 1987	24 April 1990
Minister of Public Works, Transports and Communications	Joaquim Ferreira do Amaral	PSD	24 April 1990	31 October 1991
Minister of Health	Leonor Beleza	PSD	17 August 1987	5 January 1990
Minister of Health	Arlindo de Carvalho	PSD	5 January 1990	31 October 1991
Minister of Labour and Social Security	José Silva Peneda	PSD	17 August 1987	31 October 1991
Minister of Commerce and Tourism	Joaquim Ferreira do Amaral	PSD	17 August 1987	24 April 1990
Minister of Commerce and Tourism	Fernando Faria de Oliveira	PSD	24 April 1990	31 October 1991
Assistant Minister to the Prime Minister and of Youth	António Couto dos Santos	PSD	17 August 1987	31 October 1991
Minister of the Environment and Natural Resources	Fernando Real	PSD	5 January 1990	24 April 1991
Minister of the Environment and Natural Resources	Carlos Borrego	PSD	24 April 1991	31 October 1991
Minister of the Republic for the Autonomous Region of Azores	Vasco Rocha Vieira	Independent	17 August 1987	18 April 1991
Minister of the Republic for the Autonomous Region of Azores	Mário Pinto	PSD	18 April 1991	31 October 1991
Minister of the Republic for the Autonomous Region of Madeira	Lino Miguel	Independent	17 August 1987	31 October 1991
