= 1996 Portuguese presidential election =

- 14 January 1996
- Turnout: 66.29% (▲4.13pp)
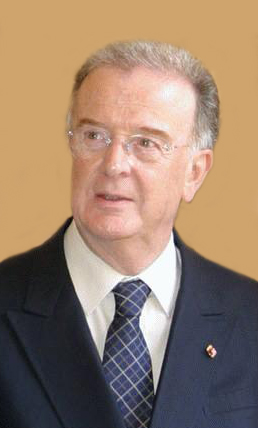

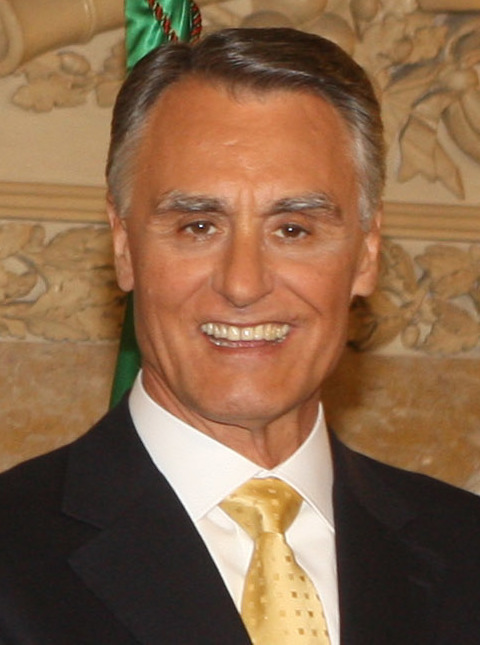
Candidate	Jorge Sampaio	Aníbal Cavaco Silva
Party	PS Supported by: PCP; PEV; UDP; PCTP/MRPP	PSD
Popular vote	3,035,056	2,595,131
Percentage	53.91%	46.09%

Sampaio
50-60%
60-70%
70-80%
80-90%
Cavaco Silva
50-60%
60-70%
70-80%
80-90%
President before election
Mário Soares
PS
Elected President
Jorge Sampaio
PS

A presidential election was held in Portugal on 14 January 1996.

Incumbent president Mário Soares was constitutionally barred from a third consecutive term. The Social Democrats were coming from a clear defeat in the 1995 Portuguese legislative election, and their former leader, Aníbal Cavaco Silva, who had left the office of Prime Minister after 10 years at the helm, ran against the Mayor of Lisbon, Jorge Sampaio. This was a rematch of the 1991 legislative election, where Cavaco Silva defeated Jorge Sampaio by a 51 to 29 percent margin.

The other left-wing candidates, Jerónimo de Sousa and Alberto Matos, presented by the Portuguese Communist Party and the People's Democratic Union respectively, both withdrew from the race one week before the elections, announcing their support for Jorge Sampaio, in order to concentrate the left-wing vote and avoid a runoff. These parties had already supported Sampaio in a coalition that won the local elections in Lisbon. It would be the last time that People's Democratic Union presented a candidate, as two years later it merged with other small left-wing parties and formed the Left Bloc.

Cavaco Silva was supported by the Social Democratic Party, failing to get the support of the People's Party, led by Manuel Monteiro. On election day, Sampaio won with nearly 54 percent of the votes and by a more than 400,000 vote margin over Cavaco Silva, which gathered just over 46 percent of the votes and, once more, the right-wing parties did not win the presidential election.

Sampaio gained the majority of the votes in all the districts in the South of Portugal, including the Communist strongholds in Alentejo and Setúbal district. Cavaco won in the more conservative districts of the North (excluding Porto district, where Sampaio edged out Cavaco by a narrow 52 to 48 percent margin) and also in Leiria district, traditional strongholds of the right-wing parties.

Voter turnout increased to 66% of registered voters compared to the previous presidential election, although it stood basically at the same level as the 1995 legislative election, held just three months earlier. Sampaio was sworn in as President on 9 March 1996. Aníbal Cavaco Silva would have to wait ten more years to be elected president in 2006.

== Background ==
Mário Soares was re-elected by a landslide with 70% of the votes in January 1991. In contrast to his first term, Soares' second term revealed a very tense relationship with prime minister Aníbal Cavaco Silva of the PSD. Soares' "open presidencies", where he would visit areas across the country to listen to citizens concerns and learn about their problems, were used by the President to criticize Cavaco's government, adding to this press leaks, in which the presidency appeared to be undermining the government.

=== Pre-campaign ===
In the follow-up for the presidential election, Lisbon mayor and former PS leader Jorge Sampaio launched his campaign early on, in February 1995, an announcement that surprised and constrained then party leader António Guterres, with President Soares also having reservations about Sampaio, although both would later strongly support him. Former president António Ramalho Eanes was rumored to be considering a run, which he ultimately dismissed, while in the PSD, although some considered the possibility of running, such as former prime minister Francisco Pinto Balsemão, being even "sounded out" by the Socialist Party in view of Guterres' initial reluctance to support Sampaio, the candidacy of prime minister Cavaco Silva was always strongly speculated upon, with himself entertaining the idea, and being made official a few days after the 1995 legislative election.

== Electoral system ==
Any Portuguese citizen over 35 years old has the opportunity to run for president. In order to do so it is necessary to gather between 7,500 and 15,000 signatures and submit them to the Portuguese Constitutional Court.

According to the Portuguese Constitution, to be elected, a candidate needs a majority of votes. If no candidate gets this majority there will take place a second round between the two most voted candidates.

== Candidates ==
=== Official candidates ===
Candidate	Party support	Political office(s)	Details
Jorge Sampaio (56)	Socialist Party Portuguese Communist Party Ecologist Party "The Greens" Popular Democratic Union Portuguese Workers' Communist Party	Mayor of Lisbon (1989–1995); Secretary-general of the Socialist Party (1989–1992); Member of the Assembly of the Republic (1976–1983; 1985–1995)	Socialist Party (PS) member; lawyer.
Aníbal Cavaco Silva (56)	Social Democratic Party	Prime Minister (1985–1995); President of the Social Democratic Party (1985–1995); Minister of Finance (1980–1981)	Social Democratic Party (PSD) member; economist.

=== Withdrew candidacy ===
Candidate	Party support	Political office(s)	Details
Jerónimo de Sousa (48)	Portuguese Communist Party Ecologist Party "The Greens"	Member of the Assembly of the Republic (1976–2022)	Portuguese Communist Party (PCP) member; withrew in favour of Jorge Sampaio.
Alberto Matos (44)	Popular Democratic Union	Member of the Almada Municipal Assembly (1993–1997); Member of the Beja Municipal Assembly (1980–1982)	Popular Democratic Union (UDP) member; withrew in favour of Jorge Sampaio.

=== Did not run ===
- António Ramalho Eanes – former President of the Republic (1976–1986)
- Francisco Pinto Balsemão – former Prime Minister (1981–1983) and PSD leader (1980–1983)
- Fernando Gomes – incumbent Mayor of Porto (1989–1998)
- Mário Sottomayor Cardia – former Minister of Education (1976–1978)

== Campaign period ==
=== Issues ===
The campaign was heavily marked by the personality clash between Cavaco Silva and Jorge Sampaio. Cavaco Silva warned of the dangers of a concentration of power under the same party, the Socialists, while Jorge Sampaio campaigned on the principle of dialogue and stability. The personal attacks were quite intense, with Cavaco's supporters criticizing Sampaio's left-wing past, and his marital history also came to light, although the former prime minister's campaign denied any involvement in this matter. Religion was also a central theme of the campaign, with Cavaco and his campaign emphasizing the importance of Catholicism and family in Portugal, while Sampaio accused his opponent of trying to divide the Portuguese people.

=== Party slogans ===
Candidate	Original slogan	English translation	Refs
Jorge Sampaio	« Um por todos »	"One for all"	
Aníbal Cavaco Silva	« Em nome de Portugal »	"In the name of Portugal"	
~~Jerónimo de Sousa~~ (Note: Withdrew in favour of Jorge Sampaio)	~~« Contigo isto muda »~~	~~"With you this changes"~~	
~~Alberto Matos~~ (Note: Withdrew in favour of Jorge Sampaio)	~~« A escolha de um lado »~~	~~"Choosing a side"~~	

=== Candidates' debates ===
1996 Portuguese presidential election debates
Date	Organisers	Moderator(s)	P Present A Absent invitee N Non-invitee			
Date	Organisers	Moderator(s)	Sampaio	Cavaco	Jerónimo	Refs
14 Dec 1995	RTP1	Maria Elisa Domingues; José Eduardo Moniz	P	P	P	
21 Dec 1995	SIC	Margarida Marante; Miguel Sousa Tavares	P	P	N	

== Opinion polls ==
Note, until 2000, the publication of opinion polls in the last week of the campaign was forbidden.

Exit poll

Polling firm	Date released	Sample size	Sampaio	Cavaco	Oth/ Und	Lead
Polling firm	Date released	Sample size	PS	PSD	Oth/ Und	Lead
Election results	14 Jan 1996	—N/a	53.9	46.1	—N/a	7.8
Euroteste	14 Jan 1996	—N/a	56–60	40–44	—N/a	16
Metris	14 Jan 1996	—N/a	56.8–61.2	38.8–43.2	—N/a	18.0
UCP	14 Jan 1996	—N/a	54.6–58.2	41.8–45.6	—N/a	12.8
UCP	6 Jan 1996	—N/a	52.1	47.9	—N/a	4.2
Metris	6 Jan 1996	—N/a	57.1	42.9	—N/a	14.2
Euroteste	6 Jan 1996	—N/a	57.5	42.5	—N/a	15.0
Euroexpansão	6 Jan 1996	—N/a	57.7	42.3	—N/a	15.4
Independente	5 Jan 1996	—N/a	56.7	43.3	—N/a	13.4
Visão	4 Jan 1996	—N/a	51.2	38.1	10.7	13.1
Euroteste	1 Jan 1996	—N/a	58.7	41.3	—N/a	17.4
Jornal de Notícias	1 Jan 1996	—N/a	50.7	42.6	6.7	8.1
Metris	30 Dec 1995	—N/a	56.4	41.7	1.9	14.7
Euroexpansão	30 Dec 1995	—N/a	58.8	40.0	1.2	18.8
Independente	29 Dec 1995	—N/a	58.3	41.7	—N/a	16.6
Euroexpansão	23 Dec 1995	—N/a	60.0	36.5	3.5	23.5
Independente	22 Dec 1995	—N/a	56.8	43.2	—N/a	13.6
UCP	21 Dec 1995	—N/a	54.1	43.7	2.2	10.4
Metris	15 Dec 1995	—N/a	53.8	42.6	3.6	11.2
Euroexpansão	25 Nov 1995	—N/a	47	39	14	8
Euroexpansão	11 Nov 1995	548	46	38	16	8
Euroexpansão	28 Oct 1995	—N/a	48	38	14	10
Euroexpansão	7 Oct 1995	—N/a	47	39	14	8
TVI/Público/Renascença	20 Jun 1995	—N/a	51.3	46.6	2.1	4.7

Hypothetical polling

Other candidates

First round

Polling firm	Date released	Jorge Sampaio	Cavaco Silva	Freitas do Amaral	Ramalho Eanes	Oth/ Und	Lead
Polling firm	Date released	PS	PSD	CDS	Ind.	Oth/ Und	Lead
TVI/Público/Renascença	20 Jun 1995	25.6	25.3	5.5	8.0	35.6	0.3

Second round

Polling firm	Date released	Jorge Sampaio	Cavaco Silva	Pinto Balsemão	Durão Barroso	Ramalho Eanes	Oth/ Und	Lead
Polling firm	Date released	PS	PSD	PSD	PSD	Ind.	Oth/ Und	Lead
Euroexpansão	7 Oct 1995	57	—N/a	26	—N/a	—N/a	17	31
Euroexpansão	7 Oct 1995	52	—N/a	—N/a	33	—N/a	15	19
Euroexpansão	7 Oct 1995	57	—N/a	—N/a	—N/a	24	19	33
TVI/Público/Renascença	20 Jun 1995	66.4	—N/a	—N/a	—N/a	28.9	4.7	37.5
TVI/Público/Renascença	20 Jun 1995	—N/a	56.2	—N/a	—N/a	38.9	4.9	37.5

Center-right preferred candidate

Polling firm	Date released	Cavaco Silva	Ramalho Eanes	Pinto Balsemão	Durão Barroso	João Deus Pinheiro	Fernando Nogueira	Eurico de Melo	Alberto J. Jardim	Mota Amaral	Rocha Vieira	Oth/ Und	Lead
Polling firm	Date released	PSD	Ind.	PSD	PSD	PSD	PSD	PSD	PSD	PSD	PSD	Oth/ Und	Lead
Euroexpansão	7 Oct 1995	51.0	14.0	6.4	5.6	3.3	2.8	2.1	0.7	0.4	0.0	13.7	37.0

== Results ==
=== National summary ===
Candidate	Party	Votes	%
Jorge Sampaio	Socialist Party (Note: Also supported by the Portuguese Communist Party, the Ecologist Party "The Greens", the Popular Democratic Union and the Portuguese Workers' Communist Party.)	3,035,056	53.91
Aníbal Cavaco Silva	Social Democratic Party	2,595,131	46.09
Total		5,630,187	100.00
Valid votes		5,630,187	97.70
Invalid votes		63,463	1.10
Blank votes		69,328	1.20
Total votes		5,762,978	100.00
Registered voters/turnout		8,693,636	66.29
Source: Comissão Nacional de Eleições

=== Results by district ===
District	Sampaio		Cavaco		Turnout
District	Votes	%	Votes	%	Turnout
Aveiro	162,495	43.04%	215,046	56.96%	69.01%
Azores	40,746	43.60%	52,715	56.40%	50.81%
Beja	71,833	79.15%	18,926	20.85%	61.31%
Braga	204,069	45.79%	241,580	54.21%	71.55%
Bragança	34,358	40.17%	51,173	59.83%	57.42%
Castelo Branco	69,136	55.50%	55,428	44.50%	63.13%
Coimbra	133,644	54.37%	112,181	45.63%	65.90%
Évora	72,369	73.32%	26,398	26.68%	67.16%
Faro	110,748	58.45%	78,736	41.55%	63.09%
Guarda	45,820	44.00%	58,306	56.00%	60.75%
Leiria	98,577	40.41%	145,352	59.59%	66.95%
Lisbon	740,987	60.98%	474,060	39.02%	66.75%
Madeira	49,243	39.58%	75,160	60.42%	62.99%
Portalegre	52,647	69.38%	23,231	30.62%	66.84%
Porto	500,903	51.82%	465,803	48.18%	70.28%
Santarém	149,119	57.50%	110,202	42.50%	67.25%
Setúbal	313,083	74.51%	107,080	25.49%	67.36%
Viana do Castelo	58,621	41.57%	82,411	58.43%	64.34%
Vila Real	51,087	39.64%	77,779	60.36%	59.10%
Viseu	78,996	36.97%	134,669	63.03%	61.63%
Source: SGMAI Presidential Election Results

=== Maps ===
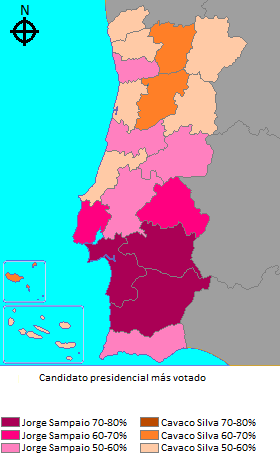
Strongest candidate by electoral district.

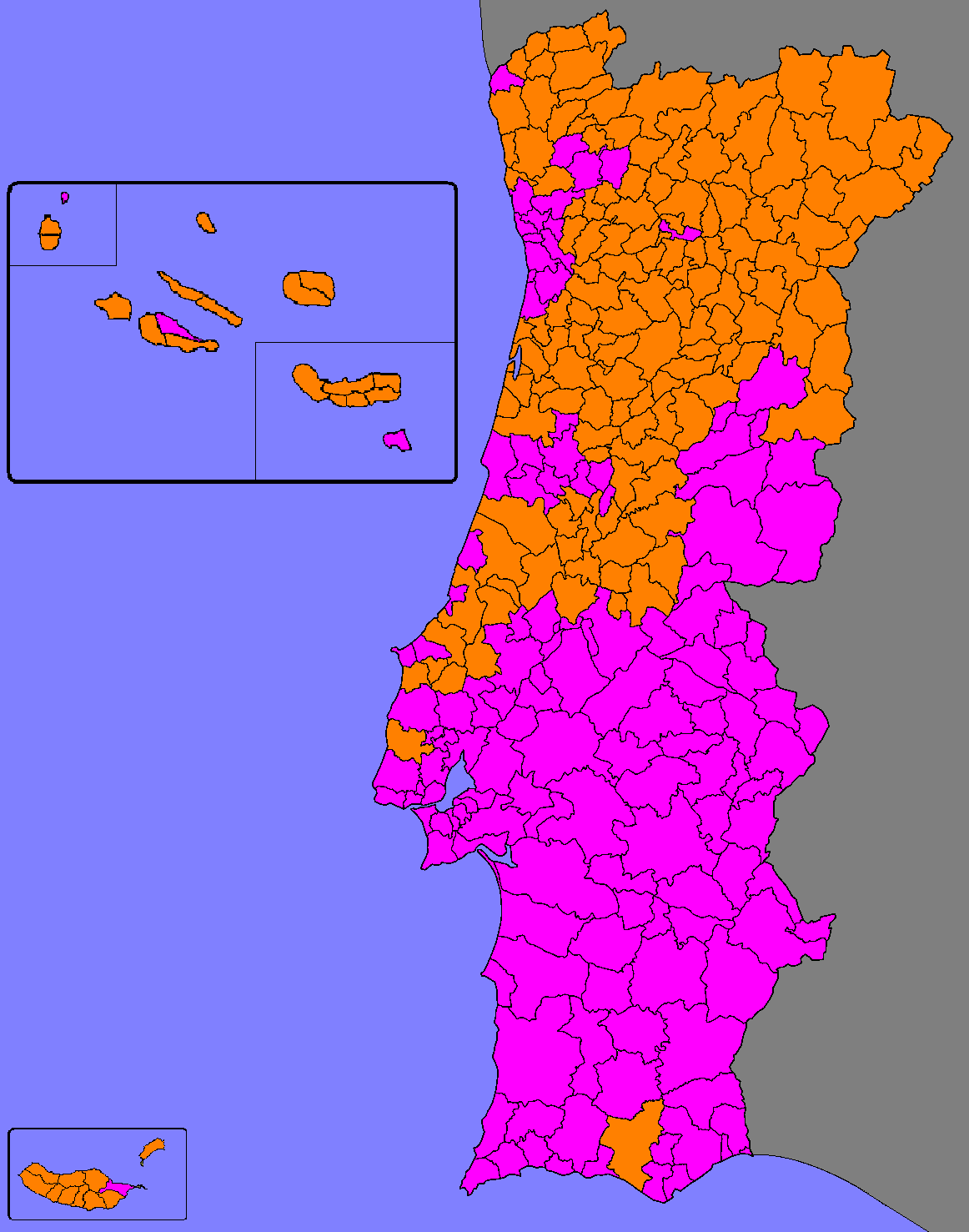
Strongest candidate by municipality.
