= XV Constitutional Government of Portugal =

Cabinet of Portugal between 2002 and 2004, led by Durão Barroso

- Cabinet of Portugal

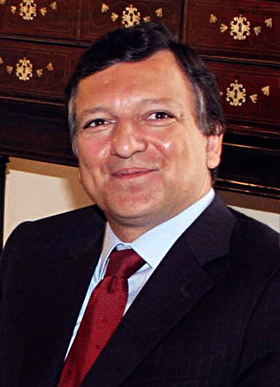
- Prime Minister José Manuel Durão Barroso
- Date formed: 6 April 2002
- Date dissolved: 17 July 2004

People and organisations
- President of the Republic: Jorge Sampaio
- Prime Minister: José Manuel Durão Barroso
- Member parties: Social Democratic Party (PSD); CDS – People's Party (CDS–PP)
- Status in legislature: Majority coalition government
- Opposition parties: Socialist Party (PS); Portuguese Communist Party (PCP); Left Bloc (BE); Ecologist Party "The Greens" (PEV)

History
- Elections: 2002 Portuguese legislative election (17 March 2002)
- Predecessor: XIV Constitutional Government of Portugal
- Successor: XVI Constitutional Government of Portugal

The XV Constitutional Government of Portugal (Portuguese: XV Governo Constitucional de Portugal) was the 15th government of the Third Portuguese Republic, under the Portuguese Constitution of 1976. The government was in office from 6 April 2002 to 17 July 2004 and was formed by a centre-right coalition between the Social Democratic Party (PSD) and the CDS – People's Party (CDS–PP). José Manuel Durão Barroso, leader of the PSD, served as Prime Minister.

== Party breakdown ==
Party breakdown of cabinet ministers by the end of the government's time in office: (Prime Minister not included)

- Social Democratic Party
12
- CDS – People's Party
2
- Independents
3

== Composition ==
The government was composed of the Prime Minister and 17 ministries comprising ministers, secretaries and under-secretaries of state.

Ministers of the XV Constitutional Government of Portugal
Office	Minister	Party	Start of term	End of term
Prime Minister	José Manuel Durão Barroso	PSD	6 April 2002	17 July 2004
Minister of State and Finances	Manuela Ferreira Leite	PSD	6 April 2002	17 July 2004
Minister of State and National Defense	Paulo Portas	CDS–PP	6 April 2002	17 July 2004
Minister of Foreign Affairs and Portuguese Communities	António Martins da Cruz	PSD	6 April 2002	9 October 2003
Minister of Foreign Affairs and Portuguese Communities	Teresa Patrício de Gouveia	PSD	9 October 2003	17 July 2004
Minister of Internal Administration	António Figueiredo Lopes	PSD	6 April 2002	17 July 2004
Minister of Justice	Celeste Cardona	CDS–PP	6 April 2002	17 July 2004
Minister of Presidency	Nuno Morais Sarmento	PSD	6 April 2002	17 July 2004
Minister of Parliamentary Affairs	Luís Marques Mendes	PSD	6 April 2002	17 July 2004
Assistant Minister to the Prime Minister (Ministro Adjunto do Primeiro-Ministro)	José Luís Arnaut	PSD	6 April 2002	17 July 2004
Minister of Economy	Carlos Tavares	PSD	6 April 2002	17 July 2004
Minister of Agriculture, Rural Development and Fisheries	Armando Sevinate Pinto	Independent	6 April 2002	17 July 2004
Minister of Education	David Justino	PSD	6 April 2002	17 July 2004
Minister of Science and Higher Education	Pedro Lynce	PSD	6 April 2002	6 October 2003
Minister of Science and Higher Education	Graça Carvalho	PSD	6 October 2003	17 July 2004
Minister of Culture	Pedro Roseta	PSD	6 April 2002	17 July 2004
Minister of Health	Luís Filipe Pereira	PSD	6 April 2002	17 July 2004
Minister of Social Security and Labour	António Bagão Félix	Independent	6 April 2002	17 July 2004
Minister of Public Works, Transportation and Housing	Luís Valente de Oliveira	PSD	6 April 2002	5 April 2003
Minister of Public Works, Transportation and Housing	António Carmona Rodrigues	Independent	5 April 2003	17 July 2004
Minister of Cities, Territorial Planning and Environment	Isaltino Morais	PSD	6 April 2002	5 April 2003
Minister of Cities, Territorial Planning and Environment	Amílcar Theias	PSD	5 April 2003	12 July 2004
Minister of Cities, Territorial Planning and Environment	Arlindo Cunha	PSD	12 July 2004	17 July 2004
