= X Constitutional Government of Portugal =

Cabinet of Portugal between 1985 and 1987, led by Aníbal Cavaco Silva

- Cabinet of Portugal

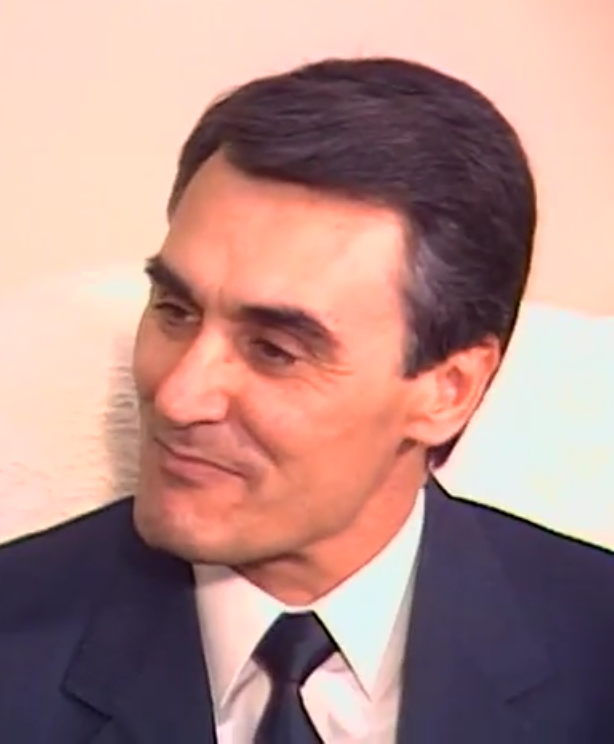
- Prime Minister Aníbal Cavaco Silva
- Date formed: 6 November 1985
- Date dissolved: 17 August 1987

People and organisations
- President of the Republic: António Ramalho Eanes; Mário Soares
- Prime Minister: Aníbal Cavaco Silva
- Member party: Social Democratic Party (PSD)
- Status in legislature: Minority
- Opposition parties: Socialist Party (PS); Democratic Renewal Party (PNR); Portuguese Communist Party (PCP); Democratic and Social Center (CDS); Portuguese Democratic Movement (MDP/CDE)

History
- Elections: 1985 Portuguese legislative election (6 October 1985)
- Predecessor: IX Constitutional Government of Portugal
- Successor: XI Constitutional Government of Portugal

The X Constitutional Government of Portugal (Portuguese: X Governo Constitucional de Portugal) was the tenth government of the Third Portuguese Republic, in office from 6 November 1985 to 17 August 1987. It was formed by members of the Social Democratic Party (PSD) and had Aníbal Cavaco Silva, leader of the PSD, as prime minister.

== Party breakdown ==
Party breakdown of cabinet ministers by the end of the government's time in office: (Prime Minister not included)

- Social Democratic Party
- Independents
11
4

== Composition ==
The government was composed of the Prime Minister, one Minister of State, and 14 ministries comprising ministers, secretaries and under-secretaries of state. The government also included the Ministers of the Republic for the Autonomous Regions of Azores and Madeira.

Ministers of the X Constitutional Government of Portugal
Office	Minister	Party	Start of term	End of term
Prime Minister	Aníbal Cavaco Silva	PSD	6 November 1985	17 August 1987
Minister of State and Internal Administration	Eurico de Melo	PSD	6 November 1985	17 August 1987
Assistant Minister to the Prime Minister and of Parliamentary Affairs (Ministro Adjunto e dos Assuntos Parlamentares)	Fernando Nogueira	PSD	6 November 1985	17 August 1987
Minister of National Defense	Leonardo Ribeiro de Almeida	PSD	6 November 1985	17 August 1987
Minister of Foreign Affairs	Pedro Pires de Miranda	Independent	6 November 1985	17 August 1987
Minister of Finance	Miguel Cadilhe	PSD	6 November 1985	17 August 1987
Minister of Justice	Mário Raposo	PSD	6 November 1985	17 August 1987
Minister of Plan and Territorial Administration	Luís Valente de Oliveira	PSD	6 November 1985	17 August 1987
Minister of Agriculture, Fisheries and Food	Álvaro Barreto	PSD	6 November 1985	17 August 1987
Minister of Industry and Commerce	Fernando Santos Martins	PSD	6 November 1985	17 August 1987
Minister of Education and Culture	João de Deus Pinheiro	PSD	6 November 1985	17 August 1987
Minister of Public Works, Transports and Communications	João Maria Oliveira Martins	PSD	6 November 1985	17 August 1987
Minister of Health	Leonor Beleza	PSD	6 November 1985	17 August 1987
Minister of Labour and Social Security	Luís Mira Amaral	Independent	6 November 1985	17 August 1987
Minister of the Republic for the Autonomous Region of Azores	Tomás Conceição Silva	Independent	6 November 1985	10 July 1986
Minister of the Republic for the Autonomous Region of Azores	Vasco Rocha Vieira	Independent	10 July 1986	17 August 1987
Minister of the Republic for the Autonomous Region of Madeira	Lino Miguel	Independent	6 November 1985	17 August 1987
