= Manuel Monteiro =

Portuguese jurist, professor and former politician

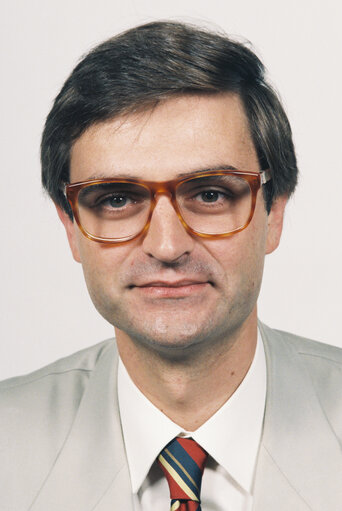
- Official portrait as an MEP, 1994

Member of the Assembly of the Republic Elections: 1985, 1995
- In office 27 October 1995 – 24 October 1999
- Constituency: Braga District
- In office 4 November 1985 – 12 August 1987
- Constituency: Porto District

President of People's Party
- In office 22 March 1992 – 22 March 1998
- Preceded by: Diogo Freitas do Amaral
- Succeeded by: Paulo Portas

President of New Democracy Party
- In office 2003–2008
- Preceded by: Office created
- Succeeded by: Joel Viana

Personal details
- Born: Manuel Fernando da Silva Monteiro; 1 April 1962 (age 64) Anissó, Vieira do Minho, Portugal
- Party: CDS - People's Party (1978-2003, 2020-present)
- Other political affiliations: New Democracy Party (2003-2008); Independent (2008-2020)
- Education: Catholic University of Portugal; Lusíada University
- Profession: Jurist; Professor

Manuel Fernando da Silva Monteiro (Anissó, Vieira do Minho, 1 April 1962) is a Portuguese jurist, professor and former politician.

== Early years ==
Manuel Monteiro started his political life during his youth. He was elected president of the People's Youth (then called Centrist Youth) in 1986.

== Political career ==
He was the winning candidate of the internal elections of March 1992 in the Democratic and Social Centre, moving the party from the traditional centrist base to the right. His political platform was against a Federal Europe, the Maastricht Treaty and the Economic and Monetary Union of the European Union.

In 1995 he changed the party's name to People's Party. The renamed party won 9% of the popular vote and 15 deputies, at the legislative elections held on 1 October 1995. This represented a partial comeback for the party that had been comprehensively defeated in the elections of 1987 and 1991. Heavy losses in the local elections of 1997, however, led Monteiro to resign., being succeeded by Paulo Portas, his former friend and protégé.

Manuel Monteiro left People's Party in 2002, following a disagreement with Paulo Portas. In June 2003 he founded the New Democracy Party (PND; Partido da Nova Democracia in Portuguese). This new political force never achieved major electoral successes, and Monteiro left the party leadership in November 2008, resigning from its membership two years later. Since then he has been politically inactive.

== Professional and academic career ==
Manuel Monteiro is a licenciate in Law from the Catholic University of Portugal. He worked at the Portuguese Industry Confederation and Banco Comercial Português. He also taught at Tomar Polytechnical Institute and Lusíada University. In 2012 he received a doctorate degree from Lusíada University.

== Electoral history ==
=== CDS leadership election, 1992 ===
Ballot: 21 March 1992
Candidate	Votes	%
Manuel Monteiro	WIN	
Basílio Horta		
António Lobo Xavier		
Turnout		
Source: CDS Congress

=== European Parliament election, 1994 ===
Ballot: 12 June 1994
Party	Candidate	Votes	%	Seats	+/−
PS	António Vitorino	1,061,560	34.9	10	+3
PSD	Eurico de Melo	1,046,918	34.4	9	±0
CDS–PP	Manuel Monteiro	379,044	12.5	3	±0
CDU	Luis Manuel de Sá	340,725	11.2	3	–1
Other parties		121,498	4.0	0	–1
Blank/Invalid ballots		94,236	3.1	–	–
Turnout		3,044,001	35.54	25	+1
Source: Comissão Nacional de Eleições

=== Legislative election, 1995 ===
Ballot: 1 October 1995
Party	Candidate	Votes	%	Seats	+/−
PS	António Guterres	2,583,755	43.8	112	+40
PSD	Fernando Nogueira	2,014,589	34.1	88	–47
CDS–PP	Manuel Monteiro	534,470	9.1	15	+10
CDU	Carlos Carvalhas	506,157	8.6	15	–2
Other parties		152,790	2.6	0	–1
Blank/Invalid ballots		113,093	1.9	–	–
Turnout		5,904,854	66.30	230	±0
Source: Comissão Nacional de Eleições

=== European Parliament election, 2004 ===
Ballot: 13 June 2004
Party	Candidate	Votes	%	Seats	+/−
PS	António Costa (Note: Second in the list, became the top candidate after the sudden death of António de Sousa Franco, the original top candidate, during the campaign.)	1,516,001	44.5	12	±0
FP	João de Deus Pinheiro	1,132,769	33.3	9	–2
CDU	Ilda Figueiredo	309,401	9.1	2	±0
BE	Miguel Portas	167,313	4.9	1	+1
PCTP/MRPP	Garcia Pereira	36,294	1.1	0	±0
PND	Manuel Monteiro	33,833	1.0	0	new
Other parties		74,505	2.2	0	±0
Blank/Invalid ballots		134,166	4.0	–	–
Turnout		3,404,782	38.60	24	–1
Source: Comissão Nacional de Eleições

=== Legislative election, 2005 ===
Ballot: 20 February 2005
Party	Candidate	Votes	%	Seats	+/−
PS	José Sócrates	2,588,312	45.0	121	+25
PSD	Pedro Santana Lopes	1,653,425	28.8	75	–30
CDU	Jerónimo de Sousa	433,369	7.5	14	+2
CDS–PP	Paulo Portas	416,415	7.3	12	–2
BE	Francisco Louçã	364,971	6.4	8	+5
PCTP/MRPP	Garcia Pereira	48,186	0.8	0	±0
PND	Manuel Monteiro	40,358	0.7	0	new
Other parties		33,583	0.6	0	±0
Blank/Invalid ballots		169,052	2.9	–	–
Turnout		5,747,834	64.26	230	±0
Source: Comissão Nacional de Eleições
