= Manuel Pereira =

Manuel Pereira may refer to:

- Manuel Pereira (baroque sculptor) (1588–1683), Portuguese sculptor, Our Lady of Montserrat Church, Madrid
- Manuel Pereira de Sampaio (1692–1750), Portuguese nobleman and diplomat
- Manuel Pereira Irarrázaval (1907–1942), Chilean diplomat and politician
- Manuel Pereira da Silva (1920–2003), Portuguese sculptor
- Manuel Pereira (Portuguese politician) (born 1928), served in Cavaco Silva's Cabinets (1985–1995)
- Manuel Pereira (fencer) (born 1961), Spanish Olympic fencer

== See also ==
- Manoel Pereira (1625–1688), Roman Catholic prelate
- Manuel Pereiras García (born 1950), Cuban author and translator
