= 1995 Portuguese legislative election =

- 1 October 1995

All 230 seats in the Assembly of the Republic 116 seats needed for a majority
- Registered: 8,906,608 ▲5.3%
- Turnout: 5,904,854 (66.3%) ▼1.5 pp
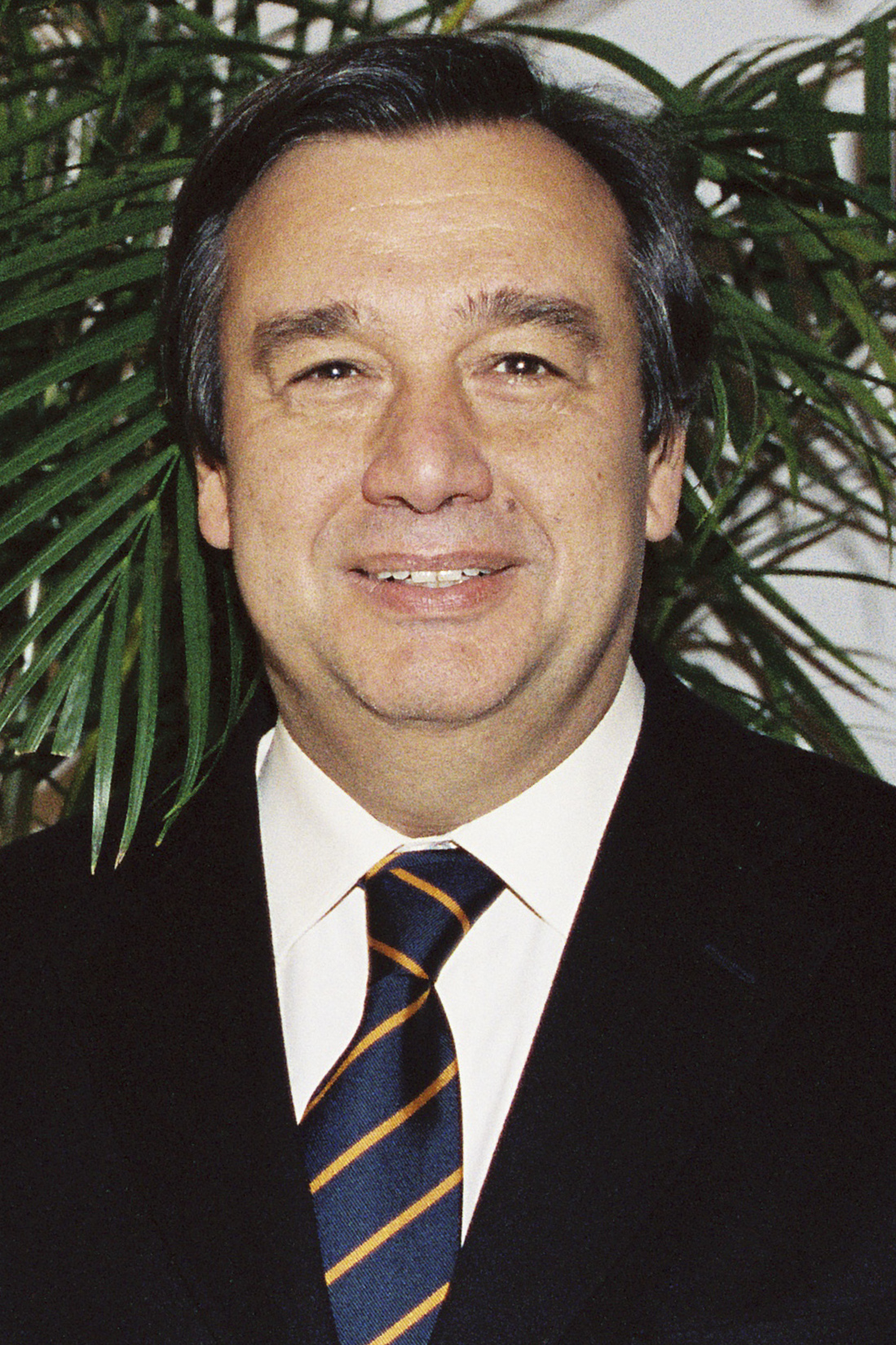

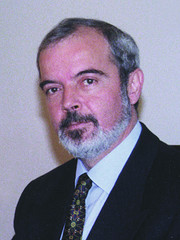

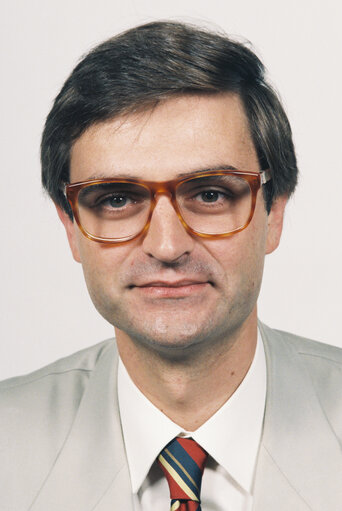

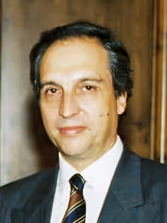
| | First party | Second party |
|---|---|---|
| Leader | António Guterres | Fernando Nogueira |
| Party | PS | PSD |
| Leader since | 23 February 1992 | 19 February 1995 |
| Leader's seat | Castelo Branco | Porto |
| Last election | 72 seats, 29.1% | 135 seats, 50.6% |
| Seats won | 112 | 88 |
| Seat change | ▲40 | ▼47 |
| Popular vote | 2,583,755 | 2,014,589 |
| Percentage | 43.8% | 34.1% |
| Swing | ▲14.7 pp | ▼16.5 pp |
| | Third party | Fourth party |
| Leader | Manuel Monteiro | Carlos Carvalhas |
| Party | CDS–PP | PCP |
| Alliance | | CDU |
| Leader since | 22 March 1992 | 5 December 1992 |
| Leader's seat | Braga | Lisbon |
| Last election | 5 seats, 4.4% | 17 seats, 8.8% |
| Seats won | 15 | 15 |
| Seat change | ▲10 | ▼2 |
| Popular vote | 534,470 | 506,157 |
| Percentage | 9.1% | 8.6% |
| Swing | ▲4.7 pp | ▼0.2 pp |
Prime Minister before election
Aníbal Cavaco Silva
PSD
Prime Minister after election
António Guterres
PS

The 1995 Portuguese legislative election took place on 1 October. The election renewed all 230 members of the Assembly of the Republic.

The incumbent prime minister, Aníbal Cavaco Silva, decided not to run for a fourth consecutive term, and the Social Democratic Party chose Fernando Nogueira, one of Cavaco Silva's deputies, as leader and candidate for prime minister at a highly contested and bitter party congress in February 1995. But the PSD was weakened by the end of the 10-year cycle of governments led by Cavaco Silva, although during the campaign there was strong speculation that Cavaco Silva would run for the 1996 presidential election, which he ultimately did and lost.

The PS easily won the election with 44 percent of the votes, against the 34 percent of the PSD, achieving their first general election victory since 1983 and after a decade in opposition, but missed the absolute majority by just 4 MPs. António Guterres, elected as PS leader three years before, became prime minister. The Social Democratic Party suffered a heavy defeat, losing almost 50 seats and 17 percentage points. This election cemented the growing bipolarization between the PS and PSD on the Portuguese political map, which would last until 2024. The two minor parties, the People's Party (CDS–PP) and the Democratic Unity Coalition (CDU) achieved only 15 MPs each, and for the first time ever the CDU failed to win a single district, and saw CDS–PP surpassing them in votes for the first time since 1976.

Although turnout, in percentage points, was lower than the previous election in 1991, almost 6 million voters cast a ballot on election day, the highest figure since 1980. Voter turnout stood at 66.3 percent, the lowest until then.

== Background ==
During his third term, Cavaco Silva's government continued the political and economic reforms, as well as infrastructure modernization, that characterized his previous two terms. However, during 1993, the economy entered a recession, with a sharp increase in unemployment, forcing the government to implement financial restraint measures to control inflation and spending, as well as to prepare the country for the European Single Currency, although growth resumed by early 1995. Recurring scandals involving government members, from accusations of nepotism and gaffes to corruption, as well as news implicating the Prime Minister himself, (mostly printed by O Independente newspaper, led by Paulo Portas, future CDS–PP leader) further eroded the government's position. The relationship between Cavaco Silva and President Mário Soares also suffered a significant deterioration. During this period, and despite having recovered some ground, the PSD was defeated in both the 1993 local elections and the 1994 European elections. Furthermore, just a few days after the 1994 European elections, the government's image was tarnished by the violent clashes and repression of protests against the increase in tolls on the 25th of April Bridge.

=== Leadership changes and challenges ===
The four main parties all changed their leaders during the 1991–1995 legislature.

==== Socialist Party ====
The 1991 general election Socialist defeat, and the scale of it, surprised the party, with António Guterres actually saying "he was in shock". Then PS leader, Jorge Sampaio, faced a lot of criticisms regarding his strategy, but announced he was running for reelection as party leader. He would face António Guterres and Álvaro Beleza. A party leadership congress was called for February 1992, however, during the days prior to the start of the congress, Sampaio withdrew from the race and Guterres was easily elected as party leader: The results were the following:

Ballot: 21 February 1992
| Candidate | Votes | % |
|---|---|---|
| António Guterres | 1,122 | 67.3 |
| Álvaro Beleza | 190 | 11.4 |
| Jorge Sampaio | withdrew | |
| Blank/Invalid ballots | 354 | 21.2 |
| Turnout | 1,666 | |
Source: Acção Socialista

==== CDS – People's Party ====
Then CDS leader, Diogo Freitas do Amaral, resigned from the leadership following the party's poor results in the 1991 general election. A party congress to elect a new leader was called for late March 1992 and 3 candidates were on the ballot: Manuel Monteiro, Basílio Horta, the party's candidate for the 1991 Presidential election and António Lobo Xavier. Manuel Monteiro was easily elected as leader:

Ballot: 21 March 1992
| Candidate | Votes | % |
|---|---|---|
| Manuel Monteiro | WIN | |
| Basílio Horta | | |
| António Lobo Xavier | | |
| Turnout | | |

Following Monteiro's election as leader, the name "People's Party (PP)" was added to the party's name in 1993, and officially approved by party delegates in a party congress two years later, in February 1995. Manuel Monteiro's more right-wing and eurosceptic positions, led party founder and former leader Freitas do Amaral to announce his departure from the party in 1992.

==== Portuguese Communist Party ====
The historic Portuguese Communist Party leader, Álvaro Cunhal, announced he would step down from the leadership of the party in late 1992. Carlos Carvalhas, the party's deputy leader was chosen as Cunhal's successor and was unanimously elected, but Cunhal remained a powerful figure within the party as a new body, the National Council, was created so that Cunhal could lead it.

Ballot: 5 December 1992
| Candidate | Votes | % |
|---|---|---|
| Carlos Carvalhas | | 100.0 |
| Turnout | | |

==== Social Democratic Party ====
After serving nearly 10 years as prime minister, there were doubts if Cavaco Silva would run for another term, thus creating a big "taboo" in Portuguese politics. Cavaco promised a decision during the spring of 1995, but in January 1995, he announced he would not run for another term as prime minister and PSD leader. This led the PSD to call a congress to elect a new leader. The congress become iconic for how tense and stormy it was, with strong accusations between several party members. Three candidates announced a run for the leadership: Former defense minister Fernando Nogueira, foreign affairs minister José Manuel Durão Barroso, and former culture secretary Pedro Santana Lopes. Santana Lopes withdrew before the ballot, and Fernando Nogueira narrowly defeated Durão Barroso by just 33 votes. The results were the following:

Ballot: 19 February 1995
| Candidate | Votes | % |
|---|---|---|
| Fernando Nogueira | 532 | 51.6 |
| José Manuel Durão Barroso | 499 | 48.4 |
| Pedro Santana Lopes | withdrew | |
| Turnout | 1,031 | |

== Electoral system ==
The Assembly of the Republic has 230 members elected to four-year terms. Governments do not require absolute majority support of the Assembly to hold office, as even if the number of opposers of government is larger than that of the supporters, the number of opposers still needs to be equal or greater than 116 (absolute majority) for both the Government's Programme to be rejected or for a motion of no confidence to be approved.

The number of seats assigned to each district depends on the district magnitude. The use of the d'Hondt method makes for a higher effective threshold than certain other allocation methods such as the Hare quota or Sainte-Laguë method, which are more generous to small parties.

For these elections, and compared with the 1991 elections, the MPs distributed by districts were the following:

| District | Number of MPs | Map |
|---|---|---|
| Lisbon | 50 | |
| Porto | 37 | |
| Setúbal^{(+1)} | 17 | |
| Braga | 16 | |
| Aveiro | 14 | |
| Leiria, Santarém and Coimbra | 10 | |
| Viseu | 9 | |
| Faro | 8 | |
| Viana do Castelo | 6 | |
| Azores, Castelo Branco, Madeira and Vila Real^{(–1)} | 5 | |
| Beja, Bragança, Évora and Guarda | 4 | |
| Portalegre | 3 | |
| Europe and Outside Europe | 2 | |

== Parties ==
The table below lists the parties represented in the Assembly of the Republic during the 6th legislature (1991–1995) and that also partook in the election:

| Name | | Ideology | Political position | Leader | 1991 result | | Seats at dissolution |
| Name | | Ideology | Political position | Leader | % | Seats | Seats at dissolution |
|---|---|---|---|---|---|---|---|
| PPD/PSD | Social Democratic Party; Partido Social Democrata | Liberal conservatism Classical liberalism | Centre-right | Fernando Nogueira | 50.6% | 135 / 230 | 135 / 230 |
| PS | Socialist Party; Partido Socialista | Social democracy Third Way | Centre-left | António Guterres | 29.1% | 72 / 230 | 72 / 230 |
| PCP | Portuguese Communist Party; Partido Comunista Português | Communism; Marxism–Leninism | Far-left | Carlos Carvalhas | 8.8% (Note: The Portuguese Communist Party (PCP) and the Ecologist Party "The Greens" (PEV) contested the 1999 election in a coalition called Unitary Democratic Coalition (CDU) and won a combined 8.8% of the vote and elected 17 MPs to parliament.) | 15 / 230 | 15 / 230 |
| PEV | Ecologist Party "The Greens"; Partido Ecologista "Os Verdes" | Eco-socialism; Green politics | Left-wing | Isabel Castro | 8.8% | 2 / 230 | 2 / 230 |
| CDS–PP | CDS – People's Party; Centro Democrático e Social – Partido Popular | Christian democracy National conservatism | Centre-right to right-wing | Manuel Monteiro | 4.4% | 5 / 230 | 4 / 230 |
| PSN | National Solidarity Party; Partido da Solidariedade Nacional | Humanism; Pensioners' rights | Centre | Carlos Bastos | 1.7% | 1 / 230 | 1 / 230 |
| Ind. | Independent; Independente | Diogo Freitas do Amaral (left the CDS – People's Party caucus) | | | | | 1 / 230 |

=== Seat changes ===
- On 9 December 1992, former party leader, founder and MP Diogo Freitas do Amaral, elected in the CDS list for Lisbon, left the party and became an Independent member following deep disagreements regarding the ideological and political direction of the party led by Manuel Monteiro, elected just a few months earlier.

== Campaign period ==
=== Issues ===
By the start of the campaign, the Social Democratic Party (PSD), under the leadership of Fernando Nogueira, was behind the PS in the polls but slowly catching up. The almost certainty of Cavaco Silva running for the presidency of the republic, in January 1996, generated hopes of electoral success for the Social Democrats in the legislative election, and Nogueira publicly campaigned on this. However, Cavaco Silva himself thwarted this strategy by stating that he had not yet decided whether to run for president, and the PSD campaign never fully recovered from this blow by Cavaco Silva. (Note: Cavaco Silva would announce his presidential run a few days after the legislative election.)

On the other hand, the Socialist Party (PS) had strong hopes of returning to power after a decade in opposition. For the campaign, the party presented itself with moderate policies (following their Estados Gerais, where the party called independents and civil society members to help draft the party's manifesto), aligning with Third Way positions, showing a new and modern image, adding a rose to its logo, and slogans pointing to a more dialogical way of governing under Guterres, in contrast to the more authoritarian style that was associated with Cavaco Silva. The PS campaign was also marked by the use of the song 1492: Conquest of Paradise by Vangelis. The communist CDU alliance contested the first election without its historic leader, Álvaro Cunhal, on the lists, while the People's Party (CDS–PP) ran under a conservative platform, with strong opposition to the PSD and Cavaco Silva, and trying to win over their discontented supporters.

=== Party slogans ===
| Party or alliance | Original slogan | English translation | Refs |
|---|---|---|---|
| PSD | « Mais e melhor para Portugal » | "More and better for Portugal" | |
| PS | « A nova maioria » | "The new majority." | |
| CDU | « Vamos dar a volta a isto » | "Let's turn this around" | |
| CDS–PP | « Vamos dar lugar a Portugal » | "Let's make way for Portugal" | |

=== Candidates' debates ===
The 1995 debates, between PSD and PS leaders, Fernando Nogueira and António Guterres, respectively, were the first election debates between party leaders since the 1985 election. This was also the first legislative election covered by private broadcasters SIC and TVI, following the opening of television to private initiative and the end of RTP's state monopoly.

1995 Portuguese legislative election debates
| Date | Organisers | Moderator(s) | P Present A Absent invitee N Non-invitee | | |
| Date | Organisers | Moderator(s) | PSD Nogueira | PS Guterres | Refs |
|---|---|---|---|---|---|
| 6 Sep | RTP1 | José Eduardo Moniz; Maria Elisa Domingues | P | P | |
| 13 Sep | SIC | Miguel Sousa Tavares; Margarida Marante | P | P | |

== Opinion polling ==
The following table shows the opinion polls of voting intention of the Portuguese voters before the election. Included is also the result of the Portuguese general elections in 1991 and 1995 for reference.

Note, until 2000, the publication of opinion polls in the last week of the campaign was forbidden.

Poll conducted after legal ban on opinion polls
Exit poll

| Polling firm/Link | Date Released | PSD | PS | CDU | CDS–PP | O | Lead |
|---|---|---|---|---|---|---|---|
| 1995 legislative election | 1 Oct 1995 | 34.1; 88 | 43.8; 112 | 8.6; 15 | 9.1; 15 | 4.4; 0 | 9.7 |
| Euroteste | 1 Oct 1995 | 35–39; 93 | 40–45; 107 | 7–9; 16 | 7–9; 14 | — | 5–6 |
| Metris | 1 Oct 1995 | 34.5; 89/95 | 42.2; 105/111 | 9.0; 14/18 | 9.2; 12/16 | 5.1; 0 | 7.7 |
| UCP | 1 Oct 1995 | 35.5 | 41 | 8 | 10 | 5.5 | 5.5 |
| Norma | 29 Sep 1995 | 40.3 | 35.2 | 9.7 | 9.3 | 5.5 | 5.1 |
| Metris | 23 Sep 1995 | 32 | 42 | 10 | 8 | 8 | 10 |
| Euroteste | 23 Sep 1995 | 35 | 39 | 9 | 10 | 7 | 4 |
| Euroexpansão | 23 Sep 1995 | 32.7; 85/89 | 44.5; 110/115 | 11.5; 20/23 | 6.9; 9 | 4.4 | 11.8 |
| UCP | 23 Sep 1995 | 35 | 40 | 9 | 10 | 6 | 5 |
| DN/TSF | 23 Sep 1995 | 33.6 | 49.7 | —N/a | —N/a | 16.7 | 16.1 |
| IPSOS | 22 Sep 1995 | 35 | 41 | 9 | 9 | 6 | 6 |
| Marktest | 21 Sep 1995 | 33 | 42 | 10 | 9 | 6 | 9 |
| DN/TSF | 18 Sep 1995 | 35 | 38 | —N/a | —N/a | 27 | 3 |
| Compta | 16 Sep 1995 | 39 | 40 | 12 | 8 | 1 | 1 |
| Euroexpansão | 16 Sep 1995 | 33.7; 90/93 | 41.8; 106/110 | 8.8; 15/16 | 9.1; 15 | 6.6 | 8.1 |
| UCP | 14 Sep 1995 | 34 | 42 | —N/a | —N/a | 24 | 8 |
| Semanário | 14 Sep 1995 | 38.5 | 40 | —N/a | —N/a | 21.5 | 1.5 |
| DN/TSF | 11 Sep 1995 | 42 | 42 | —N/a | —N/a | 17 | Tie |
| Euroexpansão | 9 Sep 1995 | 31.8; 85/89 | 41.5; 104/109 | 11.5; 22/23 | 8.7; 13/15 | 6.5 | 9.7 |
| Euroexpansão | 26 Aug 1995 | 31.5 | 36.6 | 6.6 | 10.8 | 14.5 | 5.1 |
| Euroexpansão | 29 Jul 1995 | 35.0 | 35.9 | 5.6 | 9.4 | 14.1 | 0.9 |
| Compta RH | 28 Jul 1995 | 35.8 | 43.6 | 11.7 | 7.0 | 1.8 | 7.8 |
| Compta RH | 14 Jul 1995 | 36.8 | 44.4 | 9.9 | 6.5 | 2.4 | 7.6 |
| Euroexpansão | 1 Jul 1995 | 30.4 | 37.6 | 8.6 | 10.2 | 13.2 | 7.2 |
| Compta RH | 30 Jun 1995 | 34.8 | 45.4 | 8.6 | 8.1 | 3.1 | 10.6 |
| TVI/Público/Renascença | 20 Jun 1995 | 35.6 | 40.9 | 7.4 | 7.0 | 9.1 | 5.3 |
| Compta RH | 9 Jun 1995 | 31.2 | 45.6 | 9.7 | 8.6 | 4.9 | 14.4 |
| Euroexpansão | 3 Jun 1995 | 29.6 | 39.2 | 5.9 | 8.3 | 17.0 | 9.6 |
| Euroteste | 1 May 1995 | 40.5 | 42.5 | —N/a | —N/a | 17 | 2 |
| TVI/Público/Renascença | May 1995 | 32.8 | 44.1 | —N/a | —N/a | 23.1 | 11.3 |
| 1994 EP elections | 12 Jun 1994 | 34.4 | 34.9 | 11.2 | 12.5 | 7.0 | 0.5 |
| 1993 local elections | 12 Dec 1993 | 33.7 | 40.2 | 12.8 | 8.4 | 4.9 | 6.5 |
| Euroteste | 24 Sep 1993 | 44.5 | 34.8 | 10.0 | 8.7 | 2.0 | 9.7 |
| Euroexpansão | 29 May 1993 | 33.8 | 34.6 | —N/a | —N/a | 31.6 | 0.8 |
| Euroteste | 29 May 1993 | 45.5 | 34.3 | —N/a | —N/a | 20.2 | 11.2 |
| Euroexpansão | May 1993 | 32.8 | 37.0 | 5.8 | 5.2 | 19.2 | 4.2 |
| 1991 legislative election | 6 Oct 1991 | 50.6; 135 | 29.1; 72 | 8.8; 17 | 4.4; 5 | 7.1; 1 | 21.5 |

== Results ==
=== National summary ===
| Party | Votes | % | +/– | Seats | +/– |
|---|---|---|---|---|---|
| Socialist Party | 2,583,755 | 43.76 | +14.63 | 112 | +40 |
| Social Democratic Party | 2,014,589 | 34.12 | –16.48 | 88 | –47 |
| CDS – People's Party (Note: In 1993, the Democratic Social Center added "People's Party (PP)" to the party's name, being officially approved in early 1995.) | 534,470 | 9.05 | +4.62 | 15 | +10 |
| Unitary Democratic Coalition (Note: Portuguese Communist Party (13 MPs) and "The Greens" (2 MPs) ran in coalition.) | 506,157 | 8.57 | –0.23 | 15 | –2 |
| Portuguese Workers' Communist Party | 41,137 | 0.70 | –0.15 | 0 | 0 |
| Revolutionary Socialist Party | 37,638 | 0.64 | –0.48 | 0 | 0 |
| Popular Democratic Union | 33,876 | 0.57 | +0.46 | 0 | 0 |
| National Solidarity Party | 12,613 | 0.21 | –1.47 | 0 | –1 |
| Party of the Folk | 8,279 | 0.14 | New | 0 | New |
| Earth Party | 8,235 | 0.14 | New | 0 | New |
| Ecology and Future Coalition (PPM–MPT) | 5,932 | 0.10 | –0.34 | 0 | 0 |
| Unity Movement for Workers | 2,544 | 0.04 | New | 0 | New |
| Democratic Party of the Atlantic | 2,536 | 0.04 | –0.15 | 0 | 0 |
| Total | 5,791,761 | 100.00 | – | 230 | 0 |
| Valid votes | 5,791,761 | 98.08 | +0.01 | | |
| Invalid votes | 67,300 | 1.14 | +0.04 | | |
| Blank votes | 45,793 | 0.78 | –0.05 | | |
| Total votes | 5,904,854 | 100.00 | – | | |
| Registered voters/turnout | 8,906,608 | 66.30 | –1.48 | | |
Source: Comissão Nacional de Eleições

Vote share
| PS | 43.76% |
| PSD | 34.12% |
| CDS-PP | 9.05% |
| CDU | 8.57% |
| PCTP/MRPP | 0.70% |
| PSR | 0.64% |
| UDP | 0.57% |
| Others | 0.67% |
| Blank/Invalid | 1.92% |

Parliamentary seats
| PS | 48.70% |
| PSD | 38.26% |
| CDS-PP | 6.52% |
| CDU | 6.52% |

=== Distribution by constituency ===
Results of the 1995 election of the Portuguese Assembly of the Republic by constituency
| Constituency | % | S | % | S | % | S | % | S | Total S |
| Constituency | PS | | PSD | | CDS–PP | | CDU | | Total S |
|---|---|---|---|---|---|---|---|---|---|
| Azores | 37.6 | 2 | 47.8 | 3 | 9.4 | - | 1.8 | - | 5 |
| Aveiro | 40.2 | 6 | 41.2 | 6 | 12.6 | 2 | 2.7 | - | 14 |
| Beja | 45.8 | 2 | 15.7 | 1 | 3.6 | - | 29.2 | 1 | 4 |
| Braga | 42.9 | 8 | 38.2 | 7 | 10.7 | 1 | 4.5 | - | 16 |
| Bragança | 40.3 | 2 | 44.8 | 2 | 9.4 | - | 1.9 | - | 4 |
| Castelo Branco | 53.2 | 3 | 32.1 | 2 | 7.2 | - | 5.3 | - | 5 |
| Coimbra | 49.1 | 6 | 34.5 | 4 | 7.1 | - | 5.1 | - | 10 |
| Évora | 42.6 | 2 | 20.2 | 1 | 5.2 | - | 26.9 | 1 | 4 |
| Faro | 49.6 | 5 | 29.2 | 3 | 8.3 | - | 7.8 | - | 8 |
| Guarda | 43.7 | 2 | 39.9 | 2 | 9.9 | - | 2.3 | - | 4 |
| Leiria | 36.7 | 4 | 43.3 | 5 | 11.4 | 1 | 4.5 | - | 10 |
| Lisbon | 44.3 | 24 | 29.0 | 15 | 9.4 | 5 | 12.0 | 6 | 50 |
| Madeira | 32.0 | 2 | 46.1 | 3 | 12.9 | - | 1.3 | - | 5 |
| Portalegre | 50.5 | 2 | 23.4 | 1 | 6.3 | - | 14.0 | - | 3 |
| Porto | 46.7 | 18 | 36.4 | 14 | 7.8 | 3 | 6.0 | 2 | 37 |
| Santarém | 45.8 | 5 | 31.0 | 3 | 8.7 | 1 | 9.5 | 1 | 10 |
| Setúbal | 44.9 | 9 | 18.4 | 3 | 7.2 | 1 | 23.8 | 4 | 17 |
| Viana do Castelo | 38.8 | 3 | 42.1 | 3 | 11.3 | - | 4.6 | - | 6 |
| Vila Real | 40.0 | 2 | 46.0 | 3 | 7.8 | - | 1.9 | - | 5 |
| Viseu | 38.4 | 4 | 44.3 | 4 | 11.5 | 1 | 1.8 | - | 9 |
| Europe | 35.1 | 1 | 33.8 | 1 | 4.4 | - | 6.4 | - | 2 |
| Outside Europe | 12.8 | - | 69.3 | 2 | 3.8 | - | 1.2 | - | 2 |
| Total | 43.8 | 112 | 34.1 | 88 | 9.1 | 15 | 8.6 | 15 | 230 |
Source: Comissão Nacional de Eleições

=== Maps ===
Winner and seats by constituency.

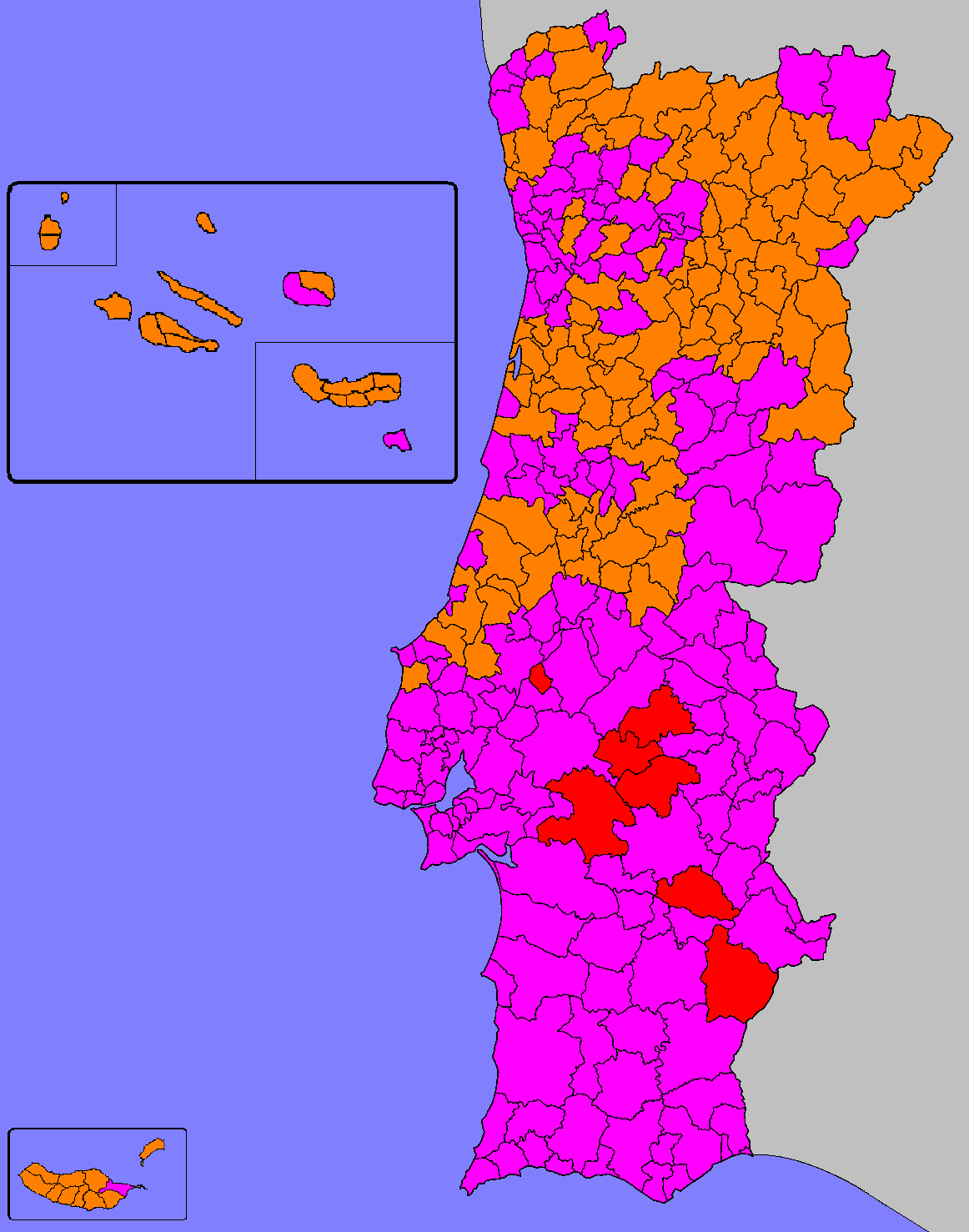
Most voted political force by municipality.

== See also ==
- Politics of Portugal
- List of political parties in Portugal
- Elections in Portugal
