= Isaltino Morais =

Portuguese jurist and politician (born 1949)

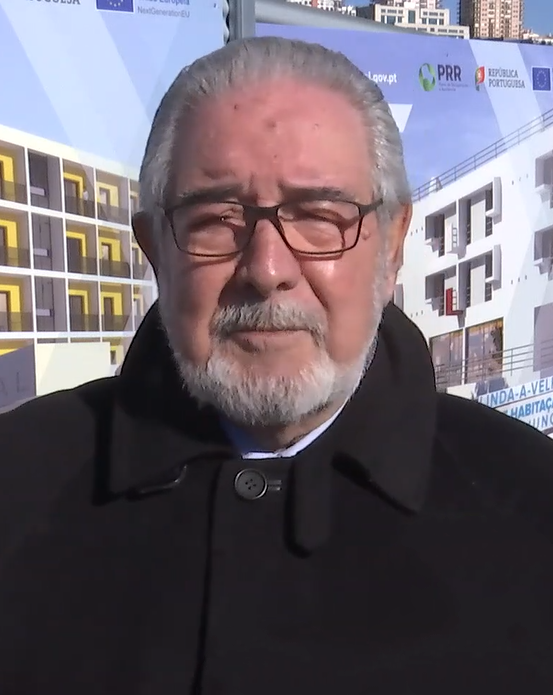
- Isaltino Morais in 2023

Mayor of Oeiras
- Incumbent
- Assumed office 21 October 2017
- Preceded by: Paulo Vistas
- In office 26 October 2005 – 8 May 2013
- Preceded by: Teresa Zambujo
- Succeeded by: Paulo Vistas
- In office 13 January 1986 – 6 April 2002
- Preceded by: João Ramos
- Succeeded by: Teresa Zambujo

Minister of Cities, Territorial Planning and Environment
- In office 6 April 2002 – 5 April 2003
- Prime Minister: José Manuel Barroso
- Preceded by: José Sócrates
- Succeeded by: Amílcar Theias

Personal details
- Born: Isaltino Afonso Morais; 29 December 1949 (age 76) Mirandela, Portugal
- Party: Independent (2005–)
- Other political affiliations: Social Democratic Party (1978–2005)
- Spouse: Patrícia Camarinho
- Children: 3
- Education: University of Lisbon
- Occupation: Jurist • Politician

Isaltino Afonso Morais (born 29 December 1949) is a Portuguese jurist and politician. He is the current mayor of Oeiras and former Minister of Cities, Territorial Planning and Environment, between 2002 and 2003.

From April 24, 2013, to June 24, 2014, he was detained, serving a sentence for crimes of qualified tax fraud and money laundering.

In 2026, Morais, along with 22 other arguidos, was accused by Portugal's public persecution service of embezzlement and abuse of power after spending €150,000 of municipal funds on meals over the period of 2017 to 2025.
