= 2006 Portuguese presidential election =

- 22 January 2006
- Opinion polls
- Turnout: 61.53% (▲11.82pp)
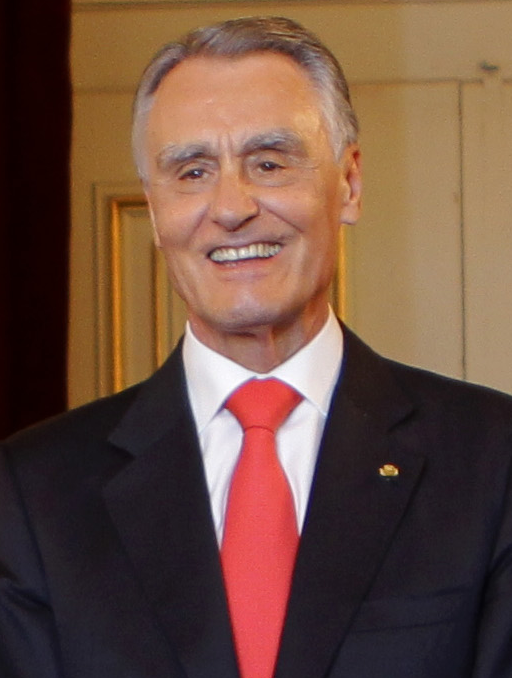

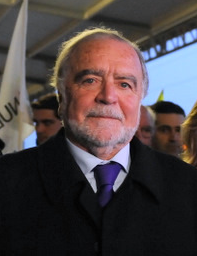

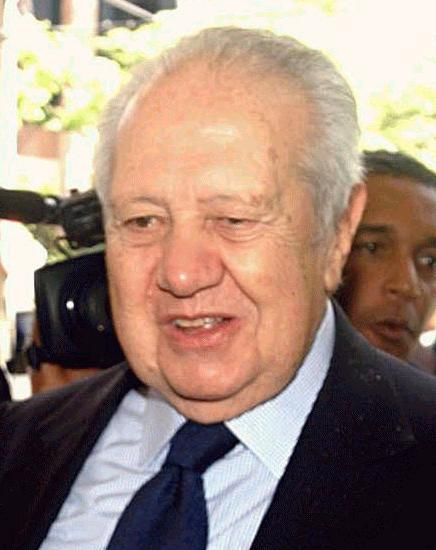

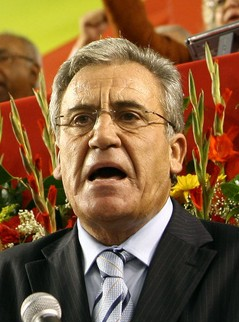

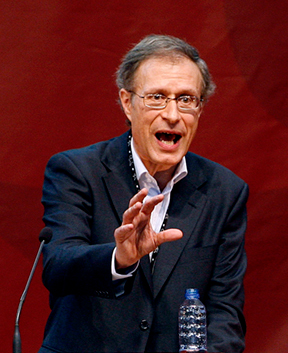
Candidate	Aníbal Cavaco Silva	Manuel Alegre	Mário Soares
Party	PSD Supported by: CDS–PP	Independent Supported by: PDA	PS
Popular vote	2,773,431	1,138,297	785,355
Percentage	50.54%	20.74%	14.31%
Candidate	Jerónimo de Sousa	Francisco Louçã
Party	PCP Supported by: PEV	BE
Popular vote	474,083	292,198
Percentage	8.64%	5.32%

Cavaco Silva
20-30%
30-40%
40-50%
50-60%
60-70%
70-80%
80-90%
Alegre
20-30%
30-40%
Soares
20-30%
Sousa
20-30%
30-40%
40-50%
President before election
Jorge Sampaio
PS
Elected President
Aníbal Cavaco Silva
PSD

A presidential election was held in Portugal on 22 January 2006 to elect a successor to the incumbent President Jorge Sampaio, who was constitutionally barred from running for a third consecutive term. The result was a narrow first-round victory for former prime minister and candidate supported by the Social Democratic Party (PSD), Aníbal Cavaco Silva, who obtained 50.54 percent of the votes, just over the majority required to avoid a runoff election.

It was the first time in which a right-wing candidate was elected President of the Republic since the 1974 Carnation Revolution, and this election would also mark the beginning of a 20-year period in which the PSD held the presidency. Former president, prime minister and PS leader, Mário Soares, suffered a massive defeat, polling third with just 14 percent of the votes, while being surpassed by his party colleague, Manuel Alegre, who came in second with almost 21 percent of the votes.

Voter turnout was 62 percent. Cavaco Silva was sworn in as President on 9 March 2006.

== Background ==
In the presidential election of 14 January 2001, the outgoing Socialist Jorge Sampaio was re-elected in the first round with 55 percent of votes. Since it was his second consecutive term, he was forbidden by the Constitution to run for another term. Sampaio's second term began with the continuation of the institutional relationship with Socialist prime minister António Guterres, which ended after the early election of March 2002, when a new cohabitation started, now with a PSD Prime Minister, José Manuel Durão Barroso. Portugal's role in the Iraq War, in which Barroso's government sided with the USA, created some discomfort between the government and the president. In the summer of 2004, Barroso resigned in order to become President of the European Commission, and Sampaio nominated the Social Democrats' new leader, Pedro Santana Lopes, as prime minister, against the objection of the PS. A few months later, a series of controversies within Santana's government, led to a split between president and prime minister, with Sampaio dismissing the government and calling a snap election. In the parliamentary election of 20 February 2005, the Socialist Party (PS), led by José Sócrates, won for the first time in its history an absolute majority of seats, while the Social Democratic Party (PSD), led by Pedro Santana Lopes, fell below 30 percent, one of their worst result since 1983. The last year of Sampaio's second term was, once again, of coexistence with a prime minister from his own party.

=== Pre-campaign ===
In the follow-up for the presidential election, the candidacy of former PSD prime minister Aníbal Cavaco Silva (1985–1995) was seen as likely for months, until its confirmation in October 2005. On the Socialist side, the vacuum left by Sampaio's departure and Cavaco's candidacy split the party, resulting in two candidacies from the same political camp, former secretary-general and President of the Republic between 1986 and 1996, Mário Soares, and party member Manuel Alegre. The then leaders of the Communist Party and the Left Bloc, Jerónimo de Sousa and Francisco Louçã, respectively, also announced their candidacies.

== Electoral system ==
Any Portuguese citizen over 35 years old has the opportunity to run for president. In order to do so it is necessary to gather between 7,500 and 15,000 signatures and submit them to the Portuguese Constitutional Court.

According to the Portuguese Constitution, to be elected, a candidate needs a majority of votes. If no candidate gets this majority there will take place a second round between the two most voted candidates.

== Candidates ==
Thirteen citizens sought election officially, but only six gathered the 7,500 signatures required under the constitution to be a candidate on the ballot. All the candidates except for Cavaco Silva were considered to be from the Portuguese political left.

=== Official candidates ===
Candidate	Party support	Political office(s)	Details
Aníbal Cavaco Silva (66)	Social Democratic Party CDS – People's Party	Prime Minister (1985–1995); President of the Social Democratic Party (1985–1995); Minister of Finance (1980–1981)	Social Democratic Party (PSD) member; candidate in the 1996 presidential election, finishing second with 46.1% of the votes.
Manuel Alegre (69)	Democratic Party of the Atlantic	Vice President of the Assembly of the Republic (1995–2009); Member of the Assembly of the Republic (1975–2009); Member of the Council of State (1996–2002; 2005–2015); Secretary of State Adjunct of the Prime Minister (1977–1978); Secretary of State for Social Communication (1976–1977)	Socialist Party (PS) member, failed to receive the support of the party; writer and poet.
Mário Soares (81)	Socialist Party	Member of the European Parliament (1999–2004); President of the Republic (1986–1996); Prime Minister (1976–1978; 1983–1985); Secretary-general of the Socialist Party (1973–1985); Minister without portfolio (1975); Minister of Foreign Affairs (1974–1975); Member of the Assembly of the Republic (1975–1986)	Former President after winning the 1986 presidential election in the second round with 51.2% of the votes, and after being reelected in the 1991 presidential election with 70.4% of the votes; eligible for a third non-consecutive term.
Jerónimo de Sousa (58)	Portuguese Communist Party Ecologist Party "The Greens"	Secretary-general of the Portuguese Communist Party (2004–2022); Member of the Assembly of the Republic (1976–2022)	Portuguese Communist Party (PCP) member; candidate in the 1996 presidential election, withrew before the ballot.
Francisco Louçã (49)	Left Bloc	Coordinator of the Left Bloc (1999–2012); Member of the Assembly of the Republic (1999–2012)	Left Bloc (BE) founding member; former Socialist Revolutionary Party leader.
António Garcia Pereira (53)	Portuguese Workers' Communist Party	Secretary-general of the Portuguese Workers' Communist Party (1982–2015)	Portuguese Workers' Communist Party (PCTP/MRPP) member; lawyer; candidate in the 2001 presidential election; finished fifth with 1.6% of the votes.

=== Unsuccessful candidacies ===
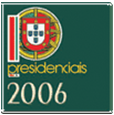
Official logo of the election.

The other potential candidates who, according to the Constitutional Court, did not gather enough signatures, were:

- Josué Rodrigues Gonçalo Pedro;
- Luís Filipe Guerra – leader of the Humanist Party;
- Teresa Lameiro;
- Manuela Magno – nuclear physicist;
- Carmelinda Pereira – leader of the Workers Party of Socialist Unity (POUS);
- Luís Botelho Ribeiro;
- Diamantino da Silva;

== Campaign period ==
=== Issues ===
The country's economic situation was one of the main themes of the campaign, as were each of the candidates personalities, with the strong clash between Cavaco Silva, Mário Soares and Manuel Alegre. Soares candidacy divided the Socialist Party, with his age and constant gaffes during the campaign raising questions, and PS MP Manuel Alegre broke party unity by announcing his candidacy, citing the need to "mobilize civil society". Cavaco Silva had the support of the two main right-wing parties, unlike 1996, and led all polls throughout the whole campaign. During the campaign, Cavaco was the target of most of his opponents' attacks, with Soares suggesting "illegitimate interests" behind Cavaco's campaign and Jerónimo de Sousa warning of a "cold and insensitive" presidency under Cavaco, while Alegre concentrated his campaign on the fight against "vested interests". Cavaco Silva, on the other hand, ran on defending a "strategic cooperation" with the government, and dramatized the election by saying that it would "shape the country's future" for the coming years.

=== Party slogans ===
Candidate	Original slogan	English translation	Refs
Aníbal Cavaco Silva	« Portugal Maior »	"Greater Portugal"	
Mário Soares	« Sempre presente nos momentos difíceis »	"Always present in difficult times"	
Manuel Alegre	« O poder dos cidadãos »	"The power of citizens"	
Jerónimo de Sousa	« Com toda a confiança »	"With all confidence"	
Francisco Louçã	« Rigor, Solidariedade »	"Rigor, Solidarity"	
António Garcia Pereira	« A coragem de mudar de rumo »	"The courage to change course"	

=== Candidates' debates ===
2006 Portuguese presidential election debates
Date	Organisers	Moderator(s)	P Present A Absent invitee N Non-invitee					
Date	Organisers	Moderator(s)	Cavaco	Soares	Alegre	Jerónimo	Louçã	Refs
5 Dec 2005	SIC	Rodrigo Guedes de Carvalho, Ricardo Costa	P	N	P	N	N	
8 Dec 2005	RTP1		N	P	N	P	N	
9 Dec 2005	TVI	Constança Cunha e Sá, Miguel Sousa Tavares	P	N	N	N	P	
12 Dec 2005	RTP1		N	N	P	N	P	
13 Dec 2005	TVI	Constança Cunha e Sá, Miguel Sousa Tavares	N	P	P	N	N	
14 Dec 2005	SIC	Rodrigo Guedes de Carvalho, Ricardo Costa	P	N	N	P	N	
15 Dec 2005	RTP1	Judite de Sousa, José Alberto Carvalho	N	N	N	P	P	
16 Dec 2005	SIC		N	P	N	N	P	
19 Dec 2005	TVI		N	N	P	P	N	
20 Dec 2005	RTP1	Judite de Sousa, José Alberto Carvalho	P	P	N	N	N	
Candidate viewed as "most convincing" in each debate
Date	Organisers	Polling firm/Link						
Date	Organisers	Polling firm/Link	Cavaco	Soares	Alegre	Jerónimo	Louçã	Refs
5 Dec 2005	SIC	Eurosondagem	27.3	—N/a	15.7	—N/a	—N/a	57.0% Neither/Tie
12 Dec 2005	TVI	Eurosondagem	—N/a	19.3	20.7	—N/a	—N/a	60.0% Neither/Tie

== Opinion polling ==
View source data.

== Voter turnout ==
The table below shows voter turnout throughout election day including voters from Overseas. Due to lack of data from the 2001 election, it's not possible to compare the turnout throughout election day between the two elections.

Turnout	Time						
Turnout	12:00		16:00		19:00		
Turnout	2001	2006	2001	2006	2001	2006	±
Total	—N/a	19.32%	—N/a	45.56%	49.71%	61.53%	▲11.82 pp

== Results ==
=== National summary ===
Candidate	Party	Votes	%
Aníbal Cavaco Silva	Social Democratic Party (Note: Also supported by CDS – People's Party.)	2,773,431	50.54
Manuel Alegre	Independent (Note: Supported by Democratic Party of the Atlantic.)	1,138,297	20.74
Mário Soares	Socialist Party	785,355	14.31
Jerónimo de Sousa	Portuguese Communist Party (Note: Also supported by the Ecologist Party "The Greens".)	474,083	8.64
Francisco Louçã	Left Bloc	292,198	5.32
António Garcia Pereira	Portuguese Workers' Communist Party	23,983	0.44
Total		5,487,347	100.00
Valid votes		5,487,347	98.16
Invalid votes		43,149	0.77
Blank votes		59,636	1.07
Total votes		5,590,132	100.00
Registered voters/turnout		9,085,339	61.53
Source: Comissão Nacional de Eleições

=== Results by district ===
District	Cavaco		Alegre		Soares		Jerónimo		Louçã		Garcia Pereira		Turnout
District	Votes	%	Votes	%	Votes	%	Votes	%	Votes	%	Votes	%	Turnout
Aveiro	228,343	59.74%	68,101	17.82%	51,696	13.52%	16,209	4.24%	16,668	4.36%	1,222	0.32%	65.06%
Azores	45,065	55.57%	13,424	16.55%	16,001	19.73%	2,250	2.77%	4,018	4.95%	345	0.43%	43.04%
Beja	21,708	27.33%	21,235	26.74%	10,633	13.39%	21,685	27.53%	3,649	4.59%	336	0.42%	58.41%
Braga	266,000	56.98%	76,836	16.46%	73,257	15.69%	26,618	5.70%	22,661	4.85%	1,464	0.31%	67.61%
Bragança	53,747	67.30%	12,714	15.92%	8,554	10.71%	2,183	2.73%	2,410	3.02%	253	0.32%	53.91%
Castelo Branco	56,618	49.70%	26,401	23.17%	18,130	15.91%	6,799	5.97%	5,513	4.84%	466	0.41%	61.37%
Coimbra	113,320	49.22%	62,908	27.32%	30,199	13.12%	13,157	5.71%	9,836	4.27%	830	0.36%	62.02%
Évora	28,166	31.48%	24,334	27.19%	12,857	14.37%	19,836	22.17%	3,982	4.45%	305	0.34%	61.97%
Faro	93,021	48.72%	44,268	23.18%	24,946	13.06%	14,540	7.61%	13,107	6.86%	1,064	0.56%	59.92%
Guarda	58,568	60.33%	18,984	19.55%	11,557	11.90%	3,964	4.08%	3,608	3.72%	400	0.41%	58.26%
Leiria	151,956	62.30%	42,424	17.39%	25,022	10.26%	12,324	5.05%	11,238	4.61%	955	0.39%	64.14%
Lisbon	498,470	44.62%	266,680	23.87%	161,411	14.45%	119,116	10.66%	64,877	5.81%	6,497	0.58%	63.84%
Madeira	76,598	58.47%	20,601	15.72%	15,595	11.90%	6,757	5.16%	10,206	7.79%	1,252	0.96%	58.19%
Portalegre	24,544	37.80%	17,184	26.46%	10,609	16.34%	9,355	14.41%	2,988	4.60%	254	0.39%	60.96%
Porto	487,852	51.29%	169,741	17.84%	168,772	17.74%	65,668	6.90%	55,959	5.88%	3,262	0.34%	66.16%
Santarém	115,032	47.75%	56,585	23.49%	31,244	12.97%	23,408	9.72%	13,513	5.61%	1,119	0.46%	63.19%
Setúbal	129,053	32.14%	109,052	27.16%	49,228	12.26%	85,117	21.20%	27,063	6.74%	1,984	0.49%	61.92%
Viana do Castelo	83,542	60.64%	22,108	16.05%	18,816	13.66%	6,616	4.80%	6,145	4.46%	530	0.38%	59.47%
Vila Real	78,465	64.61%	17,656	14.54%	17,131	14.11%	4,065	3.35%	3,738	3.08%	392	0.32%	55.17%
Viseu	136,621	65.68%	33,841	16.27%	23,123	11.22%	6,660	3.20%	7,082	3.40%	692	0.33%	58.87%
Overseas	12,048	64.63%	2,395	12.85%	2,732	14.66%	853	4.58%	495	2.66%	118	0.63%	10.07%
Source: 2006 Presidential election results

=== Maps ===
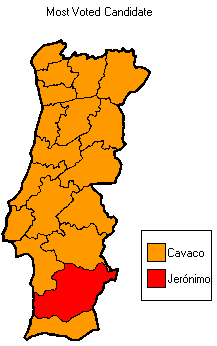
Strongest candidate by electoral district. (Azores and Madeira not shown)

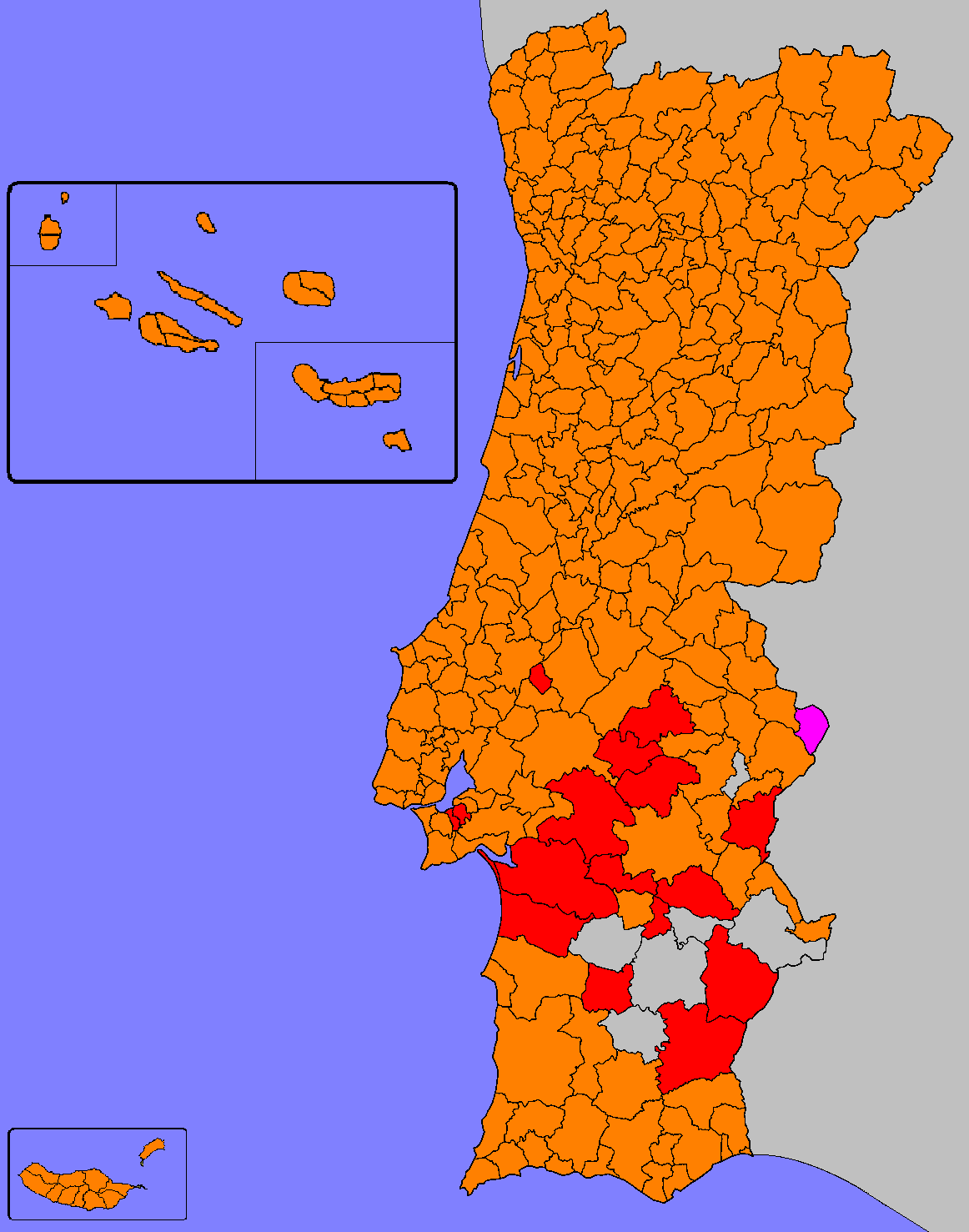
Strongest candidate by municipality.
