= Carlos Carvalhas =

Portuguese economist and politician

Carlos Carvalhas GCC
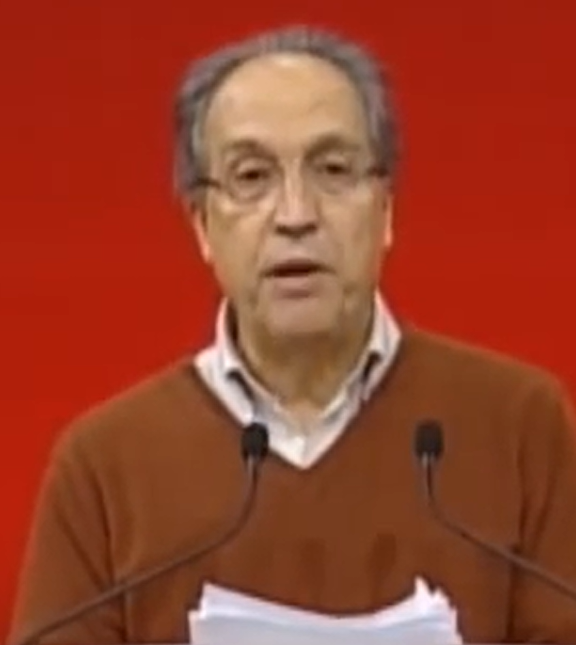
- Carvalhas in the 19th Congress of the Portuguese Communist Party, 2012

General Secretary of the Portuguese Communist Party
- In office 5 December 1992 – 27 November 2004
- Preceded by: Álvaro Cunhal
- Succeeded by: Jerónimo de Sousa

Member of the Assembly of the Republic
- In office 31 May 1983 – 9 March 2005
- Constituency: Lisbon
- In office 3 June 1976 – 12 November 1980
- Constituency: Lisbon

Personal details
- Born: Carlos Alberto do Vale Gomes Carvalhas; 9 November 1941 (age 84) São Pedro do Sul, Portugal
- Party: Portuguese Communist Party
- Spouse: Maria Manuel Lopes Marques Leal
- Children: Two children
- Parent(s): António José Bandeira Carvalhas (father); Esmeraldina do Céu Gomes Quaresma (mother)
- Education: Technical University of Lisbon

Carlos Alberto do Vale Gomes Carvalhas (born in São Pedro do Sul, 9 November 1941) is a Portuguese politician and former Secretary-General of the Portuguese Communist Party (1993–2004), succeeding Álvaro Cunhal.

He was born to António José Bandeira Carvalhas (Baiões, São Pedro do Sul, 22 April 1915 – 4 February 1999) and Esmeraldina do Céu Gomes Quaresma (b. Moldes, Arouca, 9 July 1917). His father was a businessman and owner of the warehouse Discomer that served as a food retailer for the local shops.

He was a deputy of the Assembly of the Republic for two time periods and was a candidate for the Portuguese presidency in 1991, where he received 635,373 votes (12.92%).

On 5 October 2004, he announced his intention to resign. He was replaced by Jerónimo de Sousa on 27 November 2004, at the 17th Congress of the PCP.

His late second cousin was married to the 3rd Viscount of São Pedro do Sul.

== Electoral history ==
=== Lisbon City Council election, 1985 ===
Ballot: 15 December 1985
| Party | Candidate | Votes | % | Seats | +/− |
|---|---|---|---|---|---|
| PSD | Nuno Krus Abecasis | 177,439 | 44.8 | 8 | +1 |
| APU | Carlos Carvalhas | 109,013 | 27.5 | 5 | ±0 |
| PS | Helena Torres Marques | 71,275 | 18.0 | 3 | –2 |
| PPM | Gonçalo Ribeiro Telles | 20,113 | 5.1 | 1 | +1 |
| UDP | – | 5,839 | 1.5 | 0 | ±0 |
| Other parties | | 2,812 | 0.7 | 0 | ±0 |
| Blank/Invalid ballots | | 9,850 | 2.5 | – | – |
| Turnout | | 396,341 | 58.71 | 17 | ±0 |
Source: Autárquicas 1989

=== European Parliament election, 1989 ===
Ballot: 18 June 1989
| Party | Candidate | Votes | % | Seats | +/− |
|---|---|---|---|---|---|
| PSD | António Capucho | 1,358,958 | 32.8 | 9 | –1 |
| PS | João Cravinho | 1,184,380 | 28.5 | 8 | +2 |
| CDU | Carlos Carvalhas | 597,759 | 14.4 | 4 | +1 |
| CDS–PP | Francisco Lucas Pires | 587,497 | 14.2 | 3 | –1 |
| PPM | Miguel Esteves Cardoso | 84,272 | 2.0 | 0 | ±0 |
| MDP/CDE | António Victorino de Almeida | 56,900 | 1.4 | 0 | ±0 |
| UDP | Luís Fazenda | 45,017 | 1.1 | 0 | ±0 |
| Other parties | | 107,217 | 2.6 | 0 | –1 |
| Blank/Invalid ballots | | 127,756 | 3.1 | – | – |
| Turnout | | 4,149,756 | 51.10 | 24 | ±0 |
Source: Comissão Nacional de Eleições

=== Presidential election, 1991 ===
Ballot: 13 January 1991
| Candidate | Votes | % |
|---|---|---|
| Mário Soares | 3,459,521 | 70.4 |
| Basílio Horta | 696,379 | 14.2 |
| Carlos Carvalhas | 635,373 | 12.9 |
| Carlos Manuel Marques | 126,581 | 2.6 |
| Blank/Invalid ballots | 180,214 | – |
| Turnout | 5,098,768 | 62.16 |
Source: Comissão Nacional de Eleições

=== Legislative election, 1995 ===
Ballot: 1 October 1995
| Party | Candidate | Votes | % | Seats | +/− |
|---|---|---|---|---|---|
| PS | António Guterres | 2,583,755 | 43.8 | 112 | +40 |
| PSD | Fernando Nogueira | 2,014,589 | 34.1 | 88 | –47 |
| CDS–PP | Manuel Monteiro | 534,470 | 9.1 | 15 | +10 |
| CDU | Carlos Carvalhas | 506,157 | 8.6 | 15 | –2 |
| Other parties | | 152,790 | 2.6 | 0 | –1 |
| Blank/Invalid ballots | | 113,093 | 1.9 | – | – |
| Turnout | | 5,904,854 | 66.30 | 230 | ±0 |
Source: Comissão Nacional de Eleições

=== Legislative election, 1999 ===
Ballot: 10 October 1999
| Party | Candidate | Votes | % | Seats | +/− |
|---|---|---|---|---|---|
| PS | António Guterres | 2,385,922 | 44.1 | 115 | +3 |
| PSD | José Manuel Durão Barroso | 1,750,158 | 32.3 | 81 | –7 |
| CDU | Carlos Carvalhas | 487,058 | 9.0 | 17 | +2 |
| CDS–PP | Paulo Portas | 451,643 | 8.3 | 15 | ±0 |
| BE | Francisco Louçã | 132,333 | 2.4 | 2 | new |
| Other parties | | 99,842 | 1.8 | 0 | ±0 |
| Blank/Invalid ballots | | 108,194 | 2.0 | – | – |
| Turnout | | 5,415,102 | 61.02 | 230 | ±0 |
Source: Comissão Nacional de Eleições

=== Legislative election, 2002 ===
Ballot: 17 March 2002
| Party | Candidate | Votes | % | Seats | +/− |
|---|---|---|---|---|---|
| PSD | José Manuel Durão Barroso | 2,200,765 | 40.2 | 105 | +24 |
| PS | Eduardo Ferro Rodrigues | 2,068,584 | 37.8 | 96 | –19 |
| CDS–PP | Paulo Portas | 477,350 | 8.7 | 14 | –1 |
| CDU | Carlos Carvalhas | 379,870 | 6.9 | 12 | –5 |
| BE | Francisco Louçã | 153,877 | 2.8 | 3 | +1 |
| Other parties | | 88,542 | 1.6 | 0 | ±0 |
| Blank/Invalid ballots | | 107,774 | 2.0 | – | – |
| Turnout | | 5,473,655 | 61.48 | 230 | ±0 |
Source: Comissão Nacional de Eleições
