= José Albino Silva =

Portuguese politician (born 1950)

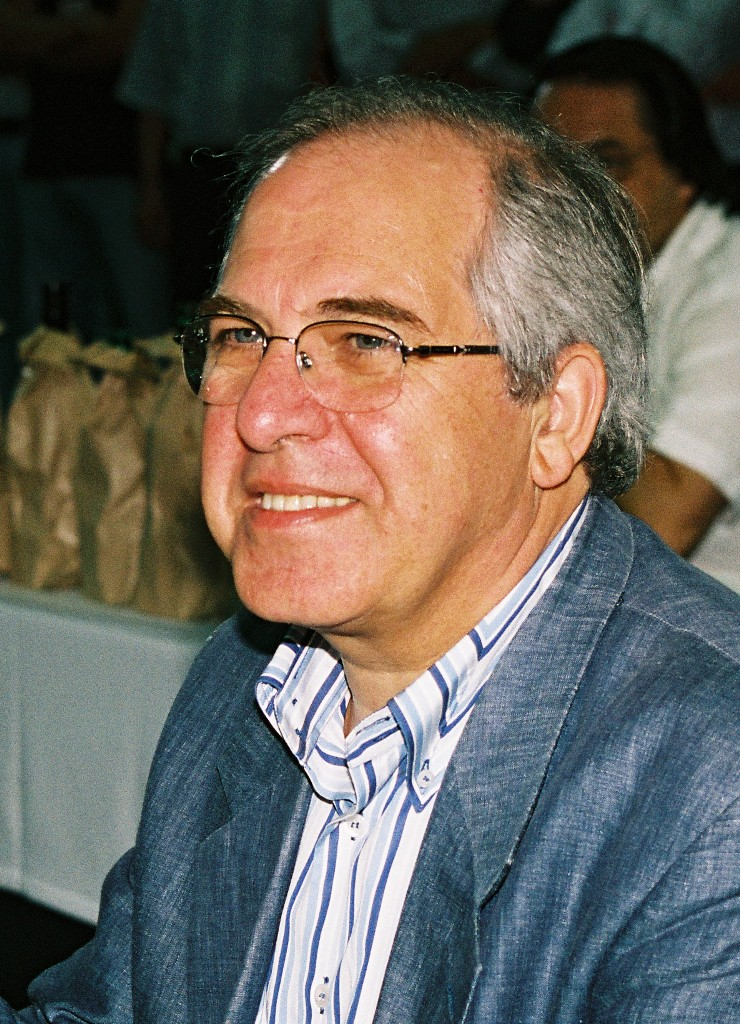
José Albino Silva Peneda

José Albino da Silva Peneda (born 6 June 1950) is a Portuguese politician and Member of the European Parliament for the Social Democratic Party–People's Party coalition; part of the European People's Party–European Democrats group.

== Career ==
Silva Peneda held various positions in the Government of Portugal, including Minister for Employment and Social Security (1987–93) during the XI and XII Constitutional Governments of Portugal. On 8 June 2010 he was made a knight of the Order of Prince Henry, awarded the senior class of Grand Cross. He was President of the Economic and Social Council (ETUC) from 22 December 2009 to 1 May 2015, the day he resigned to take over as advisor to the President of the European Commission, Jean-Claude Juncker. Silva Peneda was the president of the 2010 Organizing Committee of Portugal Day.

Silva Peneda is one of the signatories of the Petition in Defense of the Portuguese Language (Manifesto em Defesa da Língua Portuguesa), standing against the Portuguese Language Orthographic Agreement of 1990.

== Personal life ==
Silva Peneda is the brother of Juvenal da Silva Peneda, who served as the Assistant Secretary of State for Internal Affairs; Juvenal died in Porto on 6 January 2015.[4][5]

He was made a Member of the Council of National Orders on 9 June 2016.
