= Jerónimo de Sousa =

Portuguese politician (born 1947)

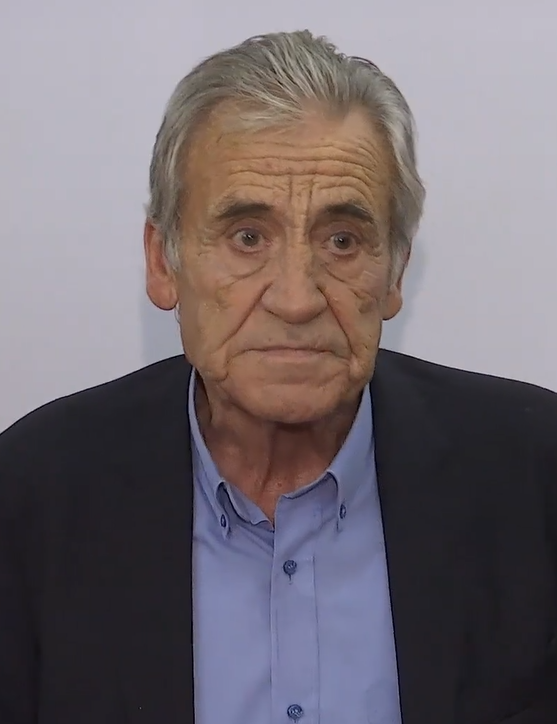
- Jerónimo de Sousa in July 2022

General Secretary of the Portuguese Communist Party
- In office 27 November 2004 – 12 November 2022
- Preceded by: Carlos Carvalhas
- Succeeded by: Paulo Raimundo

Member of the Assembly of the Republic
- In office 10 March 2005 – 21 November 2022
- Constituency: Lisbon
- In office 5 April 2002 – 9 March 2005
- Constituency: Setúbal
- In office 3 June 1976 – 26 October 1995
- Constituency: Lisbon

Personal details
- Born: Jerónimo Carvalho de Sousa; 13 April 1947 (age 78) Loures, Portugal
- Party: Portuguese Communist Party (1974–present)
- Children: 2
- Profession: Metallurgic worker

Jerónimo Carvalho de Sousa (European Portuguese pronunciation: [ʒɨˈɾɔnimu ðɨ ˈsozɐ]; born 13 April 1947) is a Portuguese politician who served as General Secretary of the Portuguese Communist Party from the 17th Congress of the Party in November 2004 to the party's National Conference in November 2022.

He is a member of the Assembly of the Republic and was also a candidate in the 2006 presidential election.

== Electoral results ==
=== 1996 Portuguese presidential election ===
Jerónimo de Sousa left the race in favour of Jorge Sampaio.

=== 2006 Portuguese presidential election ===
Jerónimo de Sousa finished fourth with 474,083 votes (8.64%).
