= Paulo Mendo =

Portuguese politician (1932–2025)

Minister of Health
- In office 7 December 1993 – 28 October 1995
- Preceded by: Arlindo de Carvalho
- Succeeded by: Maria de Belém Roseira

Member of the Assembly of the Republic of Portugal for Porto
- In office 28 October 1995 – 18 January 1999

Personal details
- Born: Adalberto Paulo da Fonseca Mendo; 3 October 1932; Lisbon, Portugal
- Died: 3 April 2025 (aged 92); Porto, Portugal
- Political party: PSD
- Education: Liceu Alexandre Herculano
- Occupation: Doctor

Adalberto Paulo da Fonseca Mendo (3 October 1932 – 3 April 2025) was a Portuguese politician. A member of the Social Democratic Party, he served as Minister of Health from 1993 to 1995 and served in the Assembly of the Republic from 1995 to 1999.

Mendo died in Porto on 3 April 2025, at the age of 92.
