= Álvaro Laborinho Lúcio =

Portuguese politician (1941–2025)

Álvaro José Brilhante Laborinho Lúcio (1 December 1941 – 23 October 2025) was a Portuguese judge and politician.

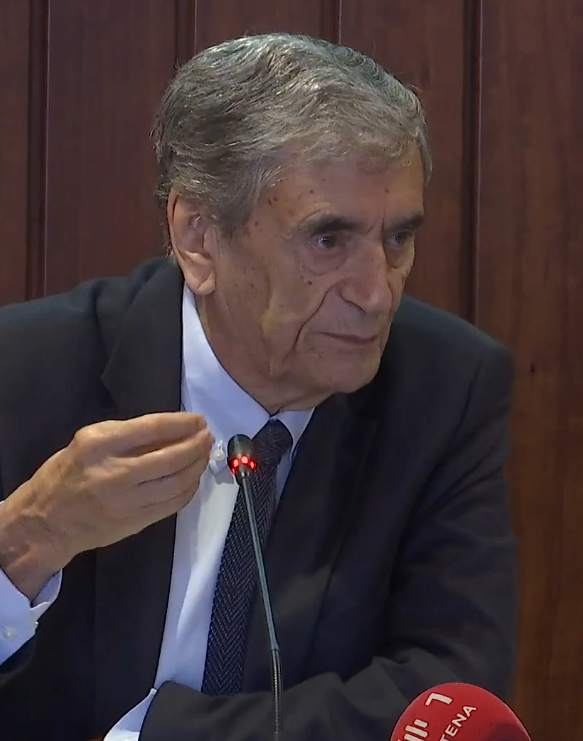
Laborinho Lúcio in 2022

== Life and career ==
Lúcio was born 1 December 1941 in Nazaré. He was minister of justice (1990–1995) and deputy (1995–1996). He also served as judge of the Supreme Court of Justice.

Laborinho Lúcio died 23 October 2025, at the age of 83.
