= António Couto dos Santos =

Portuguese politician (1949–2025)

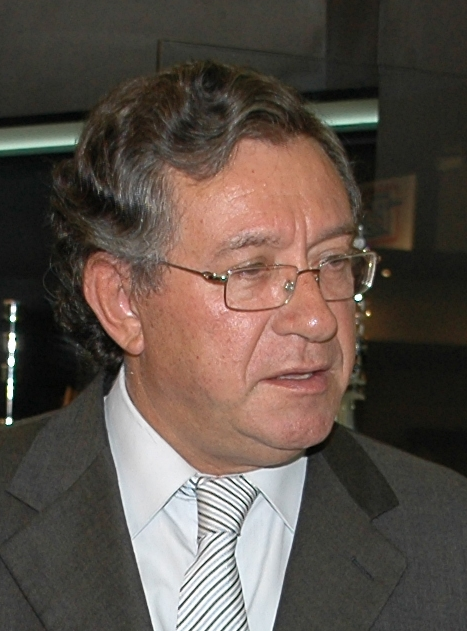
- Dos Santos in 2006

Minister of Education
- In office 19 March 1992 – 7 December 1993
- Preceded by: Diamantino Durão
- Succeeded by: Manuela Ferreira Leite

Member of the Assembly of the Republic of Portugal for Setúbal
- In office 4 November 1991 – 26 October 1995

Personal details
- Born: António Fernando Couto dos Santos; 18 May 1949 Esposende, Portugal
- Died: 6 January 2025 (aged 75) Matosinhos, Portugal
- Party: PSD
- Education: Instituto Superior Técnico
- Occupation: Chemical engineer

António Fernando Couto dos Santos (18 May 1949 – 6 January 2025) was a Portuguese politician. A member of the Social Democratic Party, he served in the Assembly of the Republic from 1991 to 1995 and was Minister of Education from 1992 to 1993.

Dos Santos died in Matosinhos on 6 January 2025, at the age of 75.
