= Arlindo Cunha =

Portuguese economist and politician

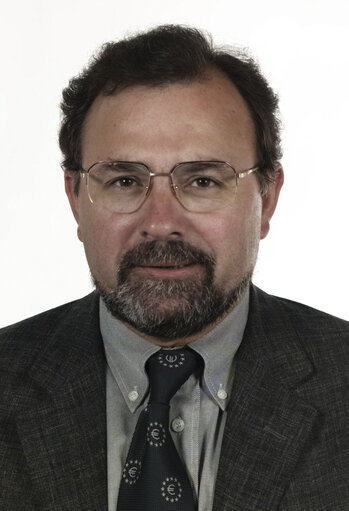
- Official portrait as an MEP, 1999

Minister of Agriculture of Portugal
- In office 1990–1994
- Preceded by: Álvaro Barreto
- Succeeded by: António Duarte Silva

Member of the European Parliament
- In office 1994–1999

Personal details
- Born: November 15, 1950 (age 75) Tábua
- Party: Social Democratic Party

Arlindo Marques da Cunha (born November 15, 1950, in Tábua) is a Portuguese economist and politician (PSD), former minister, national parliamentarian, and Member of the European Parliament (from 1994 to 2003).

== Biography ==
He graduated in economics from the University of Porto. He later studied agricultural economics and philosophy at the University of Reading.

He served as Secretary of State (1986–1990), and later as Minister of Agriculture (1990–1994) in the governments of Aníbal Cavaco Silva. In 1987 and 1991, he was elected to the Assembly of the Republic in the V and VI legislatures.

In the 1994 and 1999 elections, he was elected as a Member of the European Parliament for the IV and V legislatures, which he served until 2003. He belonged to the Christian democratic group and worked in the Committee on Agriculture and Rural Development (from 1997 to 1999 as its vice-chairman). He resigned in 2003, briefly serving as Minister of Environment in the government led by José Manuel Barroso in 2004. Later, he was associated with social organizations and advisory institutions, becoming, among other roles, the president of the King Alfonso Henry Foundation, and in 2010, the president of the regional wine commission.
