= António Figueiredo Lopes =

Portuguese politician and lawyer

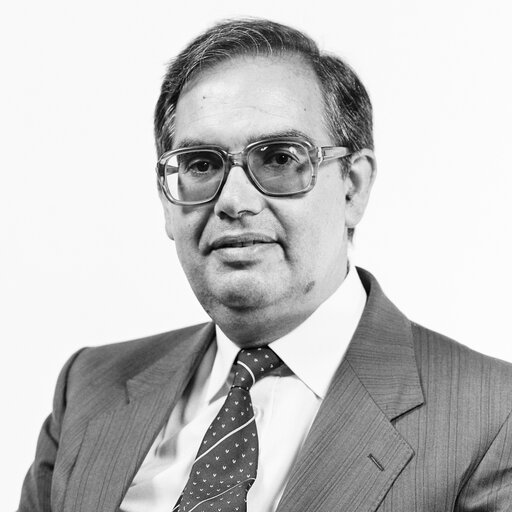
- Official portrait as an MEP, 1987

Minister of Administration and Internal Affairs
- In office 2002–2004

Personal details
- Born: 21 November 1936 (age 89) Viseu, Portugal
- Party: Social Democratic Party
- Education: University of Lisbon
- Occupation: Politician, Lawyer

António Jorge de Figueiredo Lopes (born 21 November 1936 in Viseu) is a Portuguese politician and lawyer, member of the Social Democratic Party. He served as Minister of National Defense (1995) and Minister of Administration and Internal Affairs (2002–2004).

== Biography ==
António Figueiredo Lopes graduated in law from the University of Lisbon. He initially worked in the banking sector and later in pension funds. In the early 1970s, he began to hold higher positions in government administration. Since 1974, he has been the Director General responsible for administration. In 1978, he became Secretary of State for Public Administration, and then held the same position for budget (from 1980), administrative reform (from 1981), and national defense (from 1983). In 1981, he joined the Social Democratic Party.

He was a member of the Assembly of the Republic of Portugal in the IV and VII legislatures, and from 1987 to 1988, he was a Member of the European Parliament for the II legislature.

He later worked in the structures of the European Commission as an advisor and was also a member of the scientific council of the European Institute of Public Administration. In 1991, he became Secretary of State for National Defense. In 1995, Prime Minister Aníbal Cavaco Silva appointed him Minister of National Defense, a position he held for several months, leaving office with the entire cabinet. From 1996 to 2002, he collaborated with the institute founded by Jacques Delors. From 2002 to 2004, he served as Minister of Administration and Internal Affairs in the government of José Manuel Durão Barroso.

== Honours ==
- Grand Cross of the Order of Prince Henry (Portugal, 2006)
