= Álvaro Barreto =

Portuguese politician (1936–2020)

Minister of Science, Technology and Higher Education
- In office 22 November 1978 – 1 August 1979
- Preceded by: Fernando Santos Martins
- Succeeded by: Fernando Videira

Minister of Industry and Energy
- In office 3 January 1980 – 9 January 1981
- Preceded by: Fernando Videira
- Succeeded by: Ricardo Bayão Horta

Minister of European Integration
- In office 9 January 1981 – 4 September 1981
- Preceded by: Diogo Freitas do Amaral
- Succeeded by: André Gonçalves Pereira

Minister of Commerce and Tourism
- In office 9 June 1983 – 17 October 1984
- Preceded by: Bayão Horta
- Succeeded by: Fernando Santos Martins

Minister of Agriculture
- In office 17 October 1984 – 6 November 1985
- Preceded by: Manuel Soares Costa
- Succeeded by: Office abolished

Minister of Agriculture, Fisheries, and Food
- In office 6 November 1985 – 5 January 1990
- Preceded by: Almeida Serra
- Succeeded by: Arlindo Cunha

Minister of the Economy
- In office 17 July 2004 – 12 March 2005

Personal details
- Born: 1 January 1936 Lisbon, Portugal
- Died: 10 February 2020 (aged 84) Lisbon, Portugal
- Party: PSD
- Occupation: Politician; Engineer

Álvaro Barreto (1 January 1936 – 10 February 2020) was a Portuguese politician and engineer, and a member of the Social Democratic Party. From 1978 to 2005, he occupied various government ministry offices.

== Biography ==
Barreto obtained his license in civil engineering from Instituto Superior Técnico in 1959. He then served as a project manager for Profabril until 1969, when he became an administrative director for the Lisbon shipyards.

On 22 November 1978, Barreto was appointed as Minister of Industry and Technology by Carlos Mota Pinto. However, once the Pinto government fell in 1979, Barreto left politics and joined the board of directors of TAP Air Portugal. However, he returned to government in 1980 when Francisco de Sá Carneiro formed a coalition cabinet and Barreto became Minister of Industry and Energy. The following year, after Carneiro's death, Barreto became Minister of European Integration. However, this position was abolished on 4 September 1981.

Barreto became Minister of Commerce and Tourism on 9 June 1983 after having been appointed by his ruling Social Democratic Party (PSD). After a cabinet reshuffle, he became Minister of Agriculture on 17 October 1983. He was the only member of the PSD to be elected in the Beja in the 1985 elections, and became Minister of Agriculture, Fisheries, and Food on 6 November of that same year. He was re-elected to the Assembly of the Republic in 1987, again the only member of the PSD in Beja.

After a cabinet reshuffle on 5 January 1990, Barreto was relieved of his duties as Minister of Agriculture, Fisheries, and Food. He was elected in the Lisbon in 1991 in the seventh position. He led the district's Committee on Foreign Affairs, Portuguese Communities and Cooperation. In 1995, he ran in the Castelo Branco, earning the second position. In 1999, he moved back to Lisbon, winning the second position only behind PSD leader José Manuel Barroso.

In his last election in 2002, Barreto was elected to the third position in Lisbon. In this office, he chaired the Committee on Agriculture, Rural Development and Fisheries. On 17 July 2004, he was appointed Minister of Economic Activities and Labor. Barreto retired from politics following the 2005 elections, in which he did not run.

Álvaro Barreto died on 10 February 2020 at the age of 84.
