= Fernando Nogueira =

Portuguese lawyer and politician (born 1950)

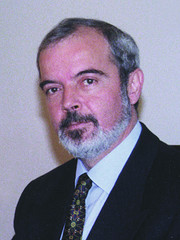

President of the Social Democratic Party
- In office 19 February 1995 – 31 March 1996
- Secretary-General: Eduardo Azevedo Soares
- Preceded by: Aníbal Cavaco Silva
- Succeeded by: Marcelo Rebelo de Sousa

Minister of National Defence
- In office 5 March 1990 – 16 March 1995
- Prime Minister: Aníbal Cavaco Silva
- Preceded by: Carlos Brito
- Succeeded by: António Figueiredo Lopes

Minister of the Presidency
- In office 17 August 1987 – 16 March 1995
- Prime Minister: Aníbal Cavaco Silva
- Preceded by: Pedro Teotónio Pereira (1961)
- Succeeded by: António Vitorino

Minister of Justice
- In office 17 August 1987 – 5 March 1990
- Prime Minister: Aníbal Cavaco Silva
- Preceded by: Mário Raposo
- Succeeded by: Álvaro Laborinho Lúcio

Minister of Parliamentary Affairs
- In office 6 November 1985 – 17 August 1987
- Prime Minister: Aníbal Cavaco Silva
- Preceded by: António de Almeida Santos
- Succeeded by: António Capucho

Secretary of State for Regional Development
- In office 18 June 1983 – 6 November 1985
- Prime Minister: Mário Soares
- Preceded by: Roberto Carneiro (Regional and Local Administration)
- Succeeded by: José Silva Peneda (Planning and Regional Development)

Member of the Assembly of the Republic Elections: 1985, 1987, 1991, 1995 (Note: Term as Member of the Assembly of the Republic suspended while a member of government, as per Portuguese law.)
- In office 4 November 1991 – 24 October 1999
- Constituency: Porto
- In office 4 November 1985 – 3 November 1991
- Constituency: Coimbra

Personal details
- Born: 26 March 1950 (age 76) Matosinhos, Portugal
- Party: Social Democratic Party
- Education: University of Coimbra

Joaquim Fernando Nogueira (born 26 March 1950), commonly known just as Fernando Nogueira, is a Portuguese lawyer and former politician.

== Life before politics ==
Fernando Nogueira was born in Matosinhos on 26 March 1950. He graduated in Law from the University of Coimbra in 1974, becoming a lawyer shortly after. He also taught at the same university.

== Political career ==
Fernando Nogueira was first elected for the Assembly of the Republic in 1985. Before that he was Secretary of State for Regional Development in the Central Bloc government led by Mário Soares. After the Social Democratic Party victory in 1985, Aníbal Cavaco Silva became Prime Minister, and Nogueira was nominated Minister of Parliamentary Affairs, initiating a career as top government minister that would span for a decade.

After the 1987 legislative election, in which his party won a majority (the first majority of a single party after the Carnation Revolution), Fernando Nogueira became Minister of Justice and Minister of Presidency, a position frequently created in many Portuguese cabinets which is responsible for the political coordination of the government. After a cabinet reshuffle in 1990, Nogueira moved to the Ministry of National Defense, continuing as Minister of Presidency. He retained both posts after the 1991 legislative election, in which the Social Democratic Party renewed its majority.

Fernando Nogueira was elected President of the Social Democratic Party on 17 February 1995, after Aníbal Cavaco Silva decided to step down after ten years as party leader (and Prime Minister) in order to run for the 1996 presidential election. By then he had been widely regarded for a long time as Cavaco's political heir, and won the party congress by 33 votes against Durão Barroso. Nogueira resigned all government posts in March 1995 and led the party into the 1995 legislative election, performing well in the television debates against the Socialist Party leader António Guterres. However, the electorate was tired of the Social Democrats and the Socialist Party won the election, with Guterres becoming prime minister. Fernando Nogueira became Leader of the Opposition, which in Portugal is an informal position which doesn't carry the same privileges and responsibilities as in other countries such as the United Kingdom.

Only months after this defeat, the party suffered another electoral loss, with Aníbal Cavaco Silva being defeated by Jorge Sampaio in the presidential election. These defeats prompted Nogueira to resign party leadership, being succeeded by Marcelo Rebelo de Sousa at the subsequent party congress. This resignation de facto ended his political career, although he retained his parliamentary seat until the 1999 legislative election.

== Current position and activities after leaving politics ==
After stepping down from parliament, Fernando Nogueira withdrew from active party politics and generally kept a very low profile ever since, although he continues to be a member of the Social Democratic Party.

Since 2012 he is President of Fundação Millennium BCP, a part of the bank responsible for supporting and financing cultural and artistic projects.

In June 2015 his name briefly returned to media spotlight after the leader of the Social Democratic Party and then prime minister, Pedro Passos Coelho, said Nogueira was his preferred candidate for the 2016 presidential election. Nogueira rapidly issued a statement stressing he was "absolutely unavailable" to return to active politics. Shortly before the 2015 legislative election he briefly reappeared again, making a video which was exhibited in a campaign rally and in which he voiced support for Pedro Passos Coelho and the alliance Portugal Ahead. The alliance won a plurality in the election and was invited to form a new government, which ended toppled by a motion of no confidence supported by a left-wing coalition.

== Electoral history ==
=== PSD leadership election, 1995 ===
Ballot: 19 February 1995
Candidate	Votes	%
Fernando Nogueira	532	51.6
José Manuel Durão Barroso	499	48.4
Pedro Santana Lopes	withdrew	
Turnout	1,031	
Source: Resultados

=== Legislative election, 1995 ===
Ballot: 1 October 1995
Party	Candidate	Votes	%	Seats	+/−
PS	António Guterres	2,583,755	43.8	112	+40
PSD	Fernando Nogueira	2,014,589	34.1	88	–47
CDS–PP	Manuel Monteiro	534,470	9.1	15	+10
CDU	Carlos Carvalhas	506,157	8.6	15	–2
Other parties		152,790	2.6	0	–1
Blank/Invalid ballots		113,093	1.9	–	–
Turnout		5,904,854	66.30	230	±0
Source: Comissão Nacional de Eleições

== Civil awards and decorations ==
- Grand-Cross of the Order of Francisco de Miranda, Venezuela (18 November 1987)
- Grand Officer of the National Order of Merit, France (5 May 1990)
- Grand-Cross of the Order of Honour, Greece (15 November 1990)
- Grand-Cross of the Order of Orange-Nassau, Netherlands (23 March 1992)
- Grand-Cross of the Order of the Republic, Tunisia (26 October 1993)
- Grand-Cross and Grand-Collar of the Order of Ouissam Alaouite, Morocco (20 February 1995)
- Grand-Cross of the Order of Merit of the Federal Republic of Germany, Germany (6 March 1995)
