= João de Deus Pinheiro =

Portuguese politician (born 1945)

João de Deus Pinheiro GCC GCIH
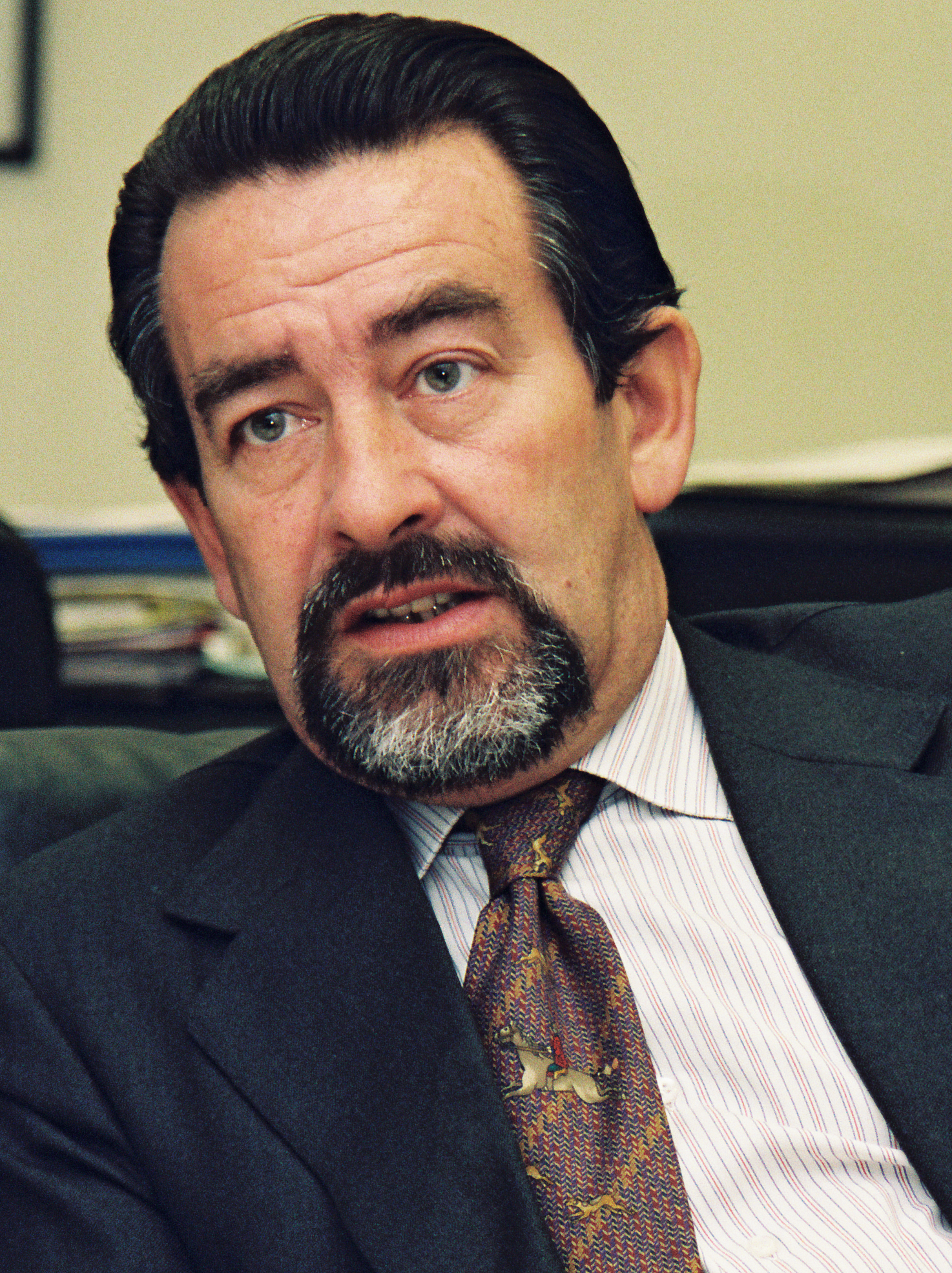
- Pinheiro in 1997

European Commissioner for Relations with African, Caribbean, Pacific Countries, South Africa and the Lomé Convention
- In office 23 January 1995 – 16 September 1999
- President: Jacques Santer; Manuel Marín
- Preceded by: Manuel Marín
- Succeeded by: Poul Nielson

European Commissioner for Relations with Parliament, Culture and Audiovisual
- In office 5 January 1993 – 23 January 1995
- President: Jacques Delors
- Preceded by: Jean Dondelinger
- Succeeded by: Marcelino Oreja

Minister of Foreign Affairs
- In office 17 August 1987 – 12 November 1992
- Prime Minister: Aníbal Cavaco Silva
- Preceded by: Pedro Pires de Miranda
- Succeeded by: José Manuel Barroso

Minister of Education and Culture
- In office 16 February 1985 – 17 August 1987
- Prime Minister: Mário Soares; Aníbal Cavaco Silva
- Preceded by: José Augusto Seabra
- Succeeded by: Roberto Carneiro

Personal details
- Born: João de Deus Rogado Salvador Pinheiro; 11 July 1945 (age 81) Lisbon, Portugal
- Party: Social Democratic Party
- Other political affiliations: European People's Party
- Spouse: Maria Manuela Vieira Paisana
- Children: 4
- Education: Instituto Superior Técnico - University of Lisbon; University of Birmingham

João de Deus Rogado Salvador Pinheiro, GCC GCIH (born 11 July 1945), is a Portuguese politician and former Member of the European Parliament for the Social Democratic Party–People's Party coalition; part of the European People's Party–European Democrats group.

== Academic career ==
João de Deus Pinheiro has a licentiate degree in chemical-industrial engineering by the Instituto Superior Técnico (1970) and a doctorate degree in the same field by the University of Birmingham (1976). Professor at the University of Lourenço Marques (Mozambique) from 1970 to 1974, and in the University of Minho after the Carnation Revolution and his return to Portugal.

== Political career ==
He was Minister for Education 1985–1987, Minister for Foreign Affairs 1987–1992; in that role he was one of the EU negotiators in Brioni Agreement that ended ten-day war in Slovenia in 1991; Member of the European Parliament and European Commissioner.

== Life after politics ==
João de Deus Pinheiro was elected member of the Assembly of the Republic in 2009 elections for Braga, but resigned shortly after for health reasons.

After leaving the European Parliament, he has been member of the board of several companies.

He is also known as a writer and amateur golfer.
