= 2010 Portuguese Social Democratic Party leadership election =

2010 Social Democratic Party leadership election
- 26 March 2010
- Turnout: 66.3% ▲7.2 pp
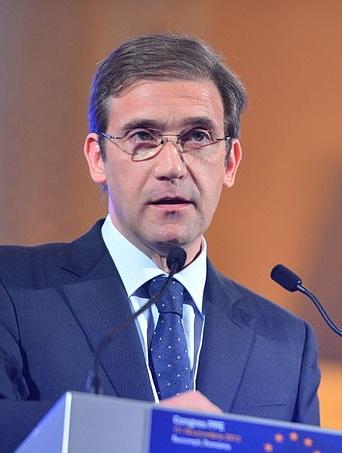

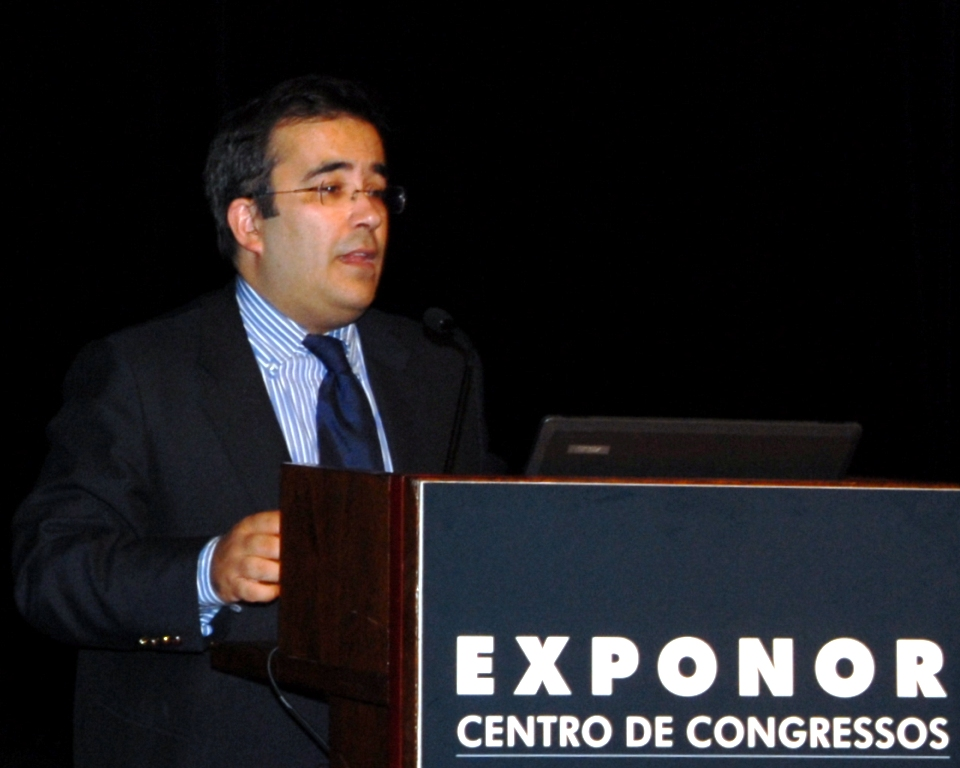

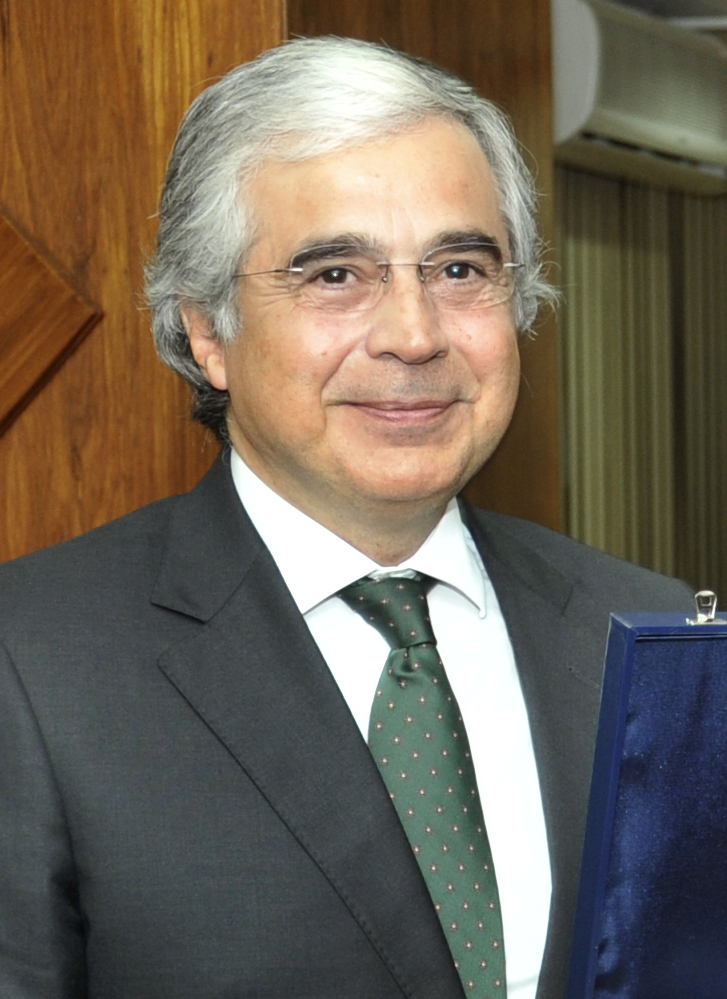
Candidate	Pedro Passos Coelho	Paulo Rangel	José Pedro Aguiar-Branco
Popular vote	31,671	17,821	1,769
Percentage	61.2%	34.4%	3.4%
Leader before election
Manuela Ferreira Leite
Elected Leader
Pedro Passos Coelho

The 2010 Portuguese Social Democratic Party leadership election was held on 26 March 2010. The leadership election was held after the defeat of the PSD in the 2009 general elections. The then PSD leader, Manuela Ferreira Leite, decided to not contest this leadership election and four candidates entered in the race: Pedro Passos Coelho, candidate also in 2008; Paulo Rangel; José Pedro Aguiar-Branco and Jorge Castanheira Barros. On election day, Passos Coelho won the leadership by a landslide, capturing more than 61% of the votes, while Rangel only polled 34%. The other two candidates had results below 4%. Passos Coelho won all districts with the only exception being Madeira.

Pedro Passos Coelho would lead the PSD to victory in the 2011 snap general elections and become Prime Minister.

== Candidates ==
Name	Born	Experience	Announcement date	Ref.
Pedro Passos Coelho	24 August 1964 (age 45); Coimbra	Social Democratic Youth leader (1990–1995); Member of Parliament for Lisbon (1991–1999)	21 January 2010	
Paulo Rangel	18 February 1968 (age 42); Vila Nova de Gaia	Member of the European Parliament (2009–2024); Leader of the Social Democratic Parliamentary Caucus (2008–2009); Member of Parliament for Porto (2005–2009)	10 February 2010	
José Pedro Aguiar-Branco	18 July 1957 (age 52); Porto	Minister of Justice (2004–2005); Member of Parliament for Porto (2005–2015)	12 February 2010	
Jorge Castanheira Barros	1952 (age 52); Coimbra	Lawyer; PSD member	4 March 2010	

=== Declined ===
- Marcelo Rebelo de Sousa – former President of the Social Democratic Party (1996–1999)

== Opinion polls ==
=== All voters ===
Polling firm/Commissioner	Fieldwork date	Sample size					Others /Undecided	Lead
Polling firm/Commissioner	Fieldwork date	Sample size	Passos Coelho	Paulo Rangel	Aguiar-Branco	Castanheira Barros	Others /Undecided	Lead
Intercampus	23–24 Mar 2010	605	36.9	25.1	9.8	1.0	27.3	11.8
Marktest	16–21 Mar 2010	808	34.7	22.9	6.3	—N/a	36.1	11.8
Euroexpansão	16–21 Mar 2010	928	33.0	22.0	5.1	0.6	39.3	11.0
CESOP–UCP	6–9 Mar 2010	1,148	27	22	7	1	43	5
Eurosondagem	4–9 Mar 2010	1,019	47.1	22.1	15.9	1.9	13.0	25.0
Aximage	17–19 Feb 2010	600	41.9	37.1	12.2	—N/a	8.8	4.8

=== PSD voters/PSD members ===
Polling firm/Commissioner	Fieldwork date	Sample size					Others /Undecided	Lead
Polling firm/Commissioner	Fieldwork date	Sample size	Passos Coelho	Paulo Rangel	Aguiar-Branco	Castanheira Barros	Others /Undecided	Lead
Intercampus (PSD voters)	23–24 Mar 2010	180	43.3	36.7	9.2	1.4	8.9	6.6
Marktest (PSD voters)	16–21 Mar 2010	140	42.2	28.9	6.7	—N/a	22.2	13.3
Euroexpansão (PSD voters)	16–21 Mar 2010	293	43.0	33.8	5.1	0.3	17.8	9.2
Pitagórica (PSD members)	15–21 Mar 2010	612	48.8	38.8	4.8	0.3	7.2	10.0
Pitagórica (PSD members)	10–14 Mar 2010	541	52.3	31.3	7.8	1.0	7.6	21.0
CESOP–UCP (PSD voters)	6–9 Mar 2010	?	35	32	8	0	25	5

Hypothetical polling

Polling firm/Commissioner	Fieldwork date	Sample size	Ferreira Leite	Marques Mendes	Marcelo Rebelo de Sousa	Paulo Rangel	Pedro Passos Coelho	Aguiar-Branco	Nuno Morais Sarmento	Rui Rio	Others /Undecided	Lead
Intercampus	23–27 Feb 2010	1,015	0.4	—N/a	27.7	20.0	25.5	7.3	—N/a	0.9	18.2	2.2
Aximage	17–19 Feb 2010	600	—N/a	—N/a	46.7	7.5	16.1	1.9	—N/a	25.0	2.8	21.7
Eurosondagem	4–9 Feb 2010	1,025	3.2	6.7	30.9	4.7	24.4	15.8	2.0	—N/a	12.3	6.5

== Results ==
Summary of the March 2010 PSD leadership election results
Candidate	26 March 2010	
Candidate	Votes	%
Pedro Passos Coelho	31,671	61.20
Paulo Rangel	17,821	34.44
José Pedro Aguiar-Branco	1,769	3.42
Castanheira Barros	138	0.27
Total	51,399	
Valid votes	51,399	99.33
Invalid and blank ballots	349	0.67
Votes cast / turnout	51,748	66.26
Registered voters	78,094	
Sources: Official results

Vote share
Pedro Passos Coelho	61.20%
Paulo Rangel	34.44%
Aguiar Branco	3.42%
Castanheira Barros	0.27%
Blank/Invalid	0.67%

== See also ==
- Social Democratic Party (Portugal)
- List of political parties in Portugal
- Elections in Portugal
