= 2008 Portuguese Social Democratic Party leadership election =

2008 Social Democratic Party leadership election
- 31 May 2008
- Turnout: 59.1% ▼3.3 pp
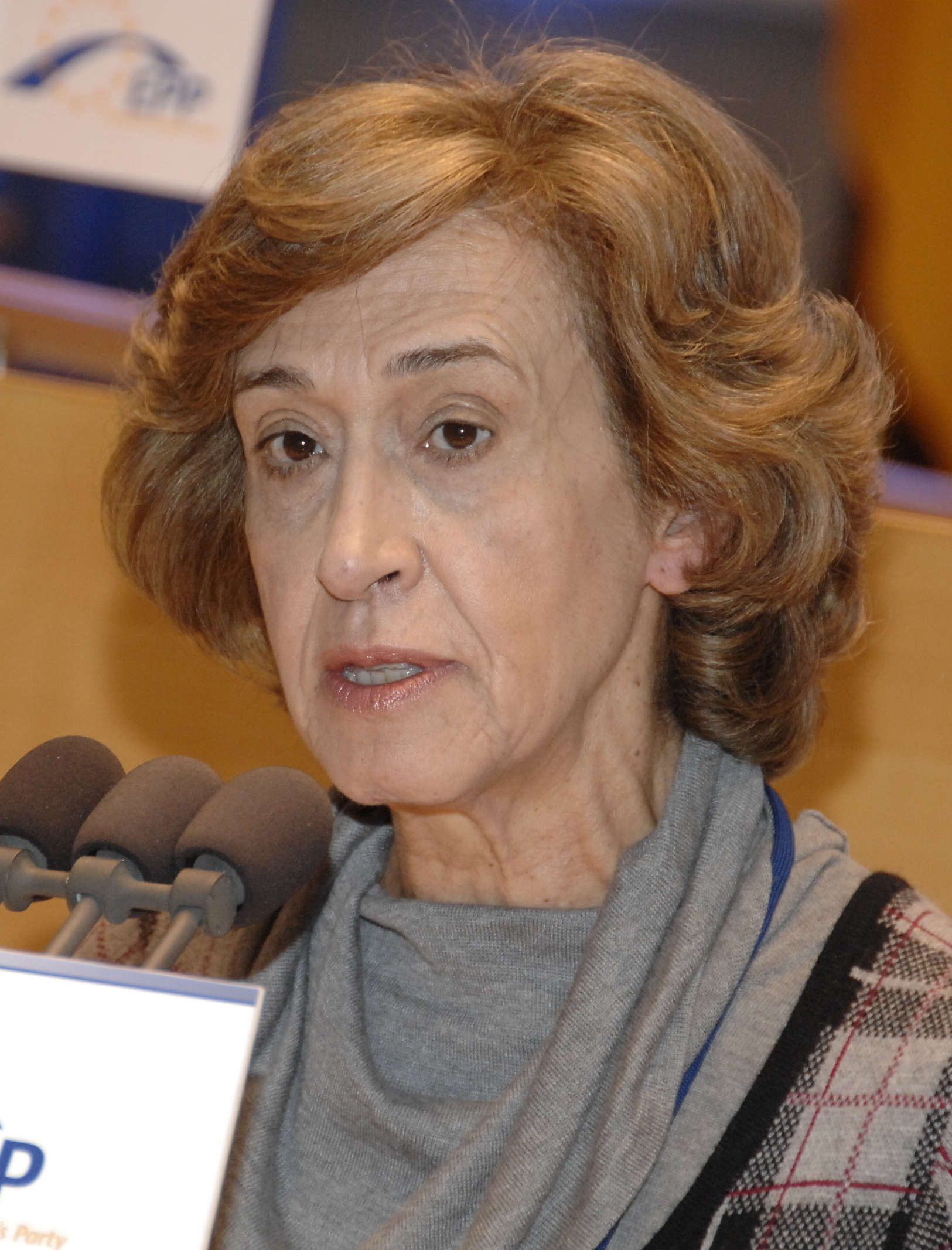

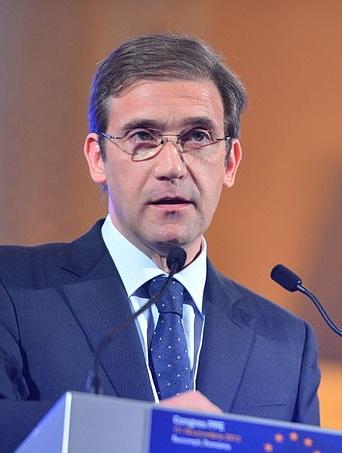

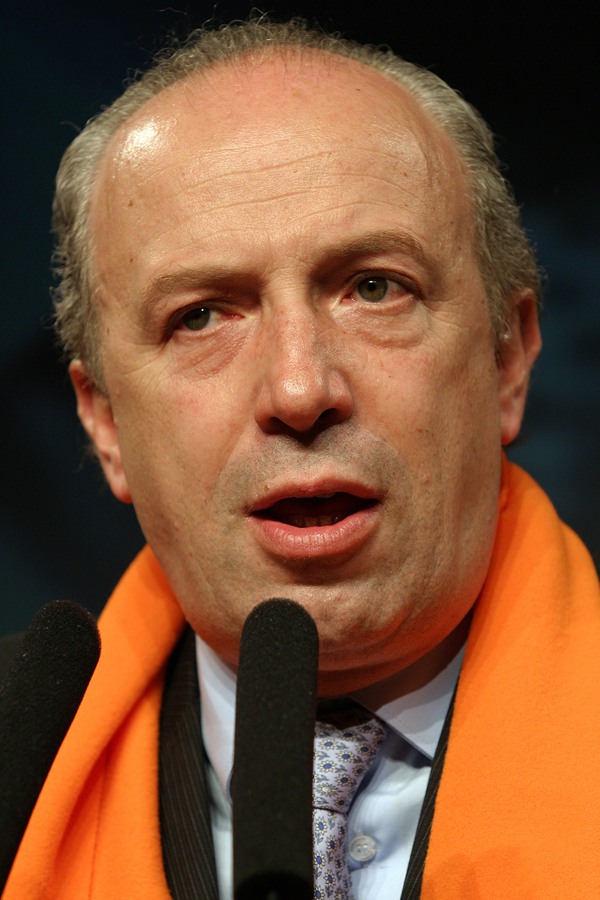
Candidate	Manuela Ferreira Leite	Pedro Passos Coelho	Pedro Santana Lopes
Popular vote	17,278	14,160	13,495
Percentage	37.9%	31.1%	29.6%
Leader before election
Luís Filipe Menezes
Elected Leader
Manuela Ferreira Leite

The 2008 Portuguese Social Democratic Party leadership election was held on 31 May 2008. This was a snap leadership election following the surprise resignation of then party leader Luís Filipe Menezes, elected just seven months before in September 2007, from the party's leadership.

Menezes was facing heavy internal criticism for his leadership and opposition strategy but, nonetheless, his resignation surprised party members and structures. Four candidates entered in this snap race: Manuela Ferreira Leite, Pedro Passos Coelho, Pedro Santana Lopes and Mário Patinha Antão.

On election day, Ferreira Leite won the leadership by capturing almost 38% of the votes, while Passos Coelho got 31% of the votes and Santana Lopes polled just below 30%. Patinha Antão polled well below 1%, just 0.7% of the party members votes.

Manuela Ferreira Leite became the first woman to lead a major political party in Portuguese history.

Ferreira Leite would lead the PSD to victory in the 2009 European Parliament election in Portugal, but was defeated in the 2009 general elections held in the fall of the same year.

== Candidates ==
Name	Born	Experience	Announcement date	Ref.
Pedro Passos Coelho	24 August 1964 (age 43); Coimbra	Social Democratic Youth leader (1990–1995); Member of Parliament for Lisbon (1991–1999)	18 April 2008	
Mário Patinha Antão	26 June 1945 (age 62); Loulé	Member of Parliament for Braga (1999–2002); Member of Parliament for Faro (2002–2009)	21 April 2008	
Pedro Santana Lopes	29 June 1956 (age 52); Lisbon	Prime Minister (2004-2005); President of the Social Democratic Party (2004–2005); Mayor of Lisbon (2002-2004); (2005); Mayor of Figueira da Foz (1997-2001); Secretary of State of Culture (1990-1994); Member of Parliament for Lisbon (1980–1991); (1999–2002); (2005–2009); Member of the European Parliament (1987–1989)	24 April 2008	
Manuela Ferreira Leite	3 December 1940 (age 67); Lisbon	Minister of Finance (2002–2004); Minister of Education (1993–1995); Member of Parliament for Lisbon (1999–2005); (2009–2011); Member of Parliament for Lisbon (1995–1999)	28 April 2008	

=== Withrew ===
- António Neto da Silva – former Secretary of State of Foreign Trade (1990–1991)

== Opinion polls ==
=== All voters ===
Polling firm/Commissioner	Fieldwork date	Sample size					Others /Undecided	Lead
Polling firm/Commissioner	Fieldwork date	Sample size	Ferreira Leite	Passos Coelho	Santana Lopes	Patinha Antão	Others /Undecided	Lead
Marktest	17–20 May 2008	800	27.3	12.2	9.6	—N/a	50.9	15.1
Intercampus	16–20 May 2008	—N/a	43.3	19.2	20.2	1.0	16.3	23.1
Eurosondagem	23–29 Apr 2008	—N/a	29	15.5	25	3	27.5	4

=== PSD voters ===
Polling firm/Commissioner	Fieldwork date	Sample size					Others /Undecided	Lead
Polling firm/Commissioner	Fieldwork date	Sample size	Ferreira Leite	Passos Coelho	Santana Lopes	Patinha Antão	Others /Undecided	Lead
Marktest	17–20 May 2008	800	43.2	9.1	17.4	—N/a	30.3	25.8
Aximage	5–9 May 2008	—N/a	40.8	3.0	13.2	—N/a	43.0	27.6

== Results ==
Summary of the May 2008 PSD leadership election results
Candidate	31 May 2008	
Candidate	Votes	%
Manuela Ferreira Leite	17,278	37.90
Pedro Passos Coelho	14,160	31.06
Pedro Santana Lopes	13,495	29.60
Patinha Antão	308	0.68
Total	45,241	
Valid votes	45,241	99.23
Invalid and blank ballots	351	0.77
Votes cast / turnout	45,592	59.14
Registered voters	77,090	
Sources: Official results

Vote share
Manuela Ferreira Leite	37.90%
Pedro Passos Coelho	31.06%
Pedro Santana Lopes	29.60%
Patinha Antão	0.68%
Blank/Invalid	0.77%

== See also ==
- Social Democratic Party (Portugal)
- List of political parties in Portugal
- Elections in Portugal
