= 2014 Portuguese Social Democratic Party leadership election =

2014 Social Democratic Party leadership election
- 25 January 2014
- Turnout: 42.5% ▲2.3 pp
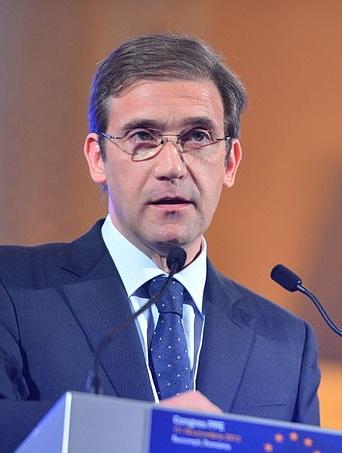
| Candidate | Pedro Passos Coelho |
| Popular vote | 17,521 |
| Percentage | 88.9% |
Leader before election
Pedro Passos Coelho
Elected Leader
Pedro Passos Coelho

The 2014 Portuguese Social Democratic Party leadership election was held on 25 January 2014. Then PSD leader and Prime Minister Pedro Passos Coelho ran for a 3rd term as party leader and was the sole candidate in the race, thus winning with almost 90% of the votes.

== Candidates ==
| Name | Born | Experience | Announcement date | Ref. |
|---|---|---|---|---|
| Pedro Passos Coelho | 24 August 1964 (age 49); Coimbra | Social Democratic Youth leader (1990–1995); President of the Social Democratic Party (2010–2018); Prime Minister (2011–2015); Member of Parliament for Lisbon (1991–1999); Member of Parliament for Vila Real (2011–2015) | 17 January 2014 | |

== Opinion polling ==
Hypothetical polling

| Polling firm | Fieldwork date | Sample size | Pedro Passos Coelho | Rui Rio | Manuela Ferreira Leite | Paulo Rangel | José Pedro Aguiar-Branco | Jorge Moreira da Silva | Others/ Undecided | Lead |
|---|---|---|---|---|---|---|---|---|---|---|
| Pitagórica | 20–24 Jan 2014 | 506 | 12.6 | 45.8 | 13.8 | 5.2 | —N/a | —N/a | 18.7 | 32.0 |
| Pitagórica | 10–15 Dec 2013 | 503 | 18.5 | 47.5 | 14.6 | 4.0 | —N/a | —N/a | 10.8 | 29.0 |
| Pitagórica | 14–19 Oct 2013 | 506 | 8.7 | 45.5 | 15.2 | 5.6 | —N/a | —N/a | 19.8 | 30.3 |
| Pitagórica | 24–28 Jul 2013 | 503 | 11.3 | 39.4 | 17.9 | 9.1 | —N/a | —N/a | 16.0 | 12.4 |
| Pitagórica | 28 Jun–2 Jul 2013 | 503 | 14.3 | 30.7 | 18.7 | 11.4 | —N/a | —N/a | 17.3 | 12.0 |
| Pitagórica | 23–28 May 2013 | 503 | 15.5 | 35.2 | 13.7 | 6.0 | —N/a | —N/a | 25.0 | 19.7 |
| Pitagórica | 17–20 Apr 2013 | 503 | 13.0 | 37.9 | 15.9 | 6.1 | —N/a | —N/a | 22.0 | 22.0 |
| Pitagórica | 19–24 Mar 2013 | 503 | 7.6 | 38.4 | 17.6 | 9.0 | 4.1 | 1.9 | 21.3 | 20.8 |
| Pitagórica | 20–24 Feb 2013 | 503 | 12.5 | 29.8 | 15.8 | 7.5 | 5.6 | —N/a | 28.7 | 14.0 |
| Pitagórica | 22–25 Jan 2013 | 504 | 10.6 | 30.2 | 13.3 | 13.6 | 3.1 | 0.8 | 28.5 | 16.6 |
| Pitagórica | 9–12 Nov 2012 | 505 | 12.4 | 36.2 | 17.6 | 6.7 | —N/a | —N/a | 23.3 | 18.6 |
| Pitagórica | 8–13 Oct 2012 | 503 | 11.0 | 30.0 | 15.4 | 6.4 | 5.9 | 1.3 | 30.1 | 14.6 |

== Results ==
Summary of the January 2014 PSD leadership election results
| Candidate | 25 January 2014 | |
| Candidate | Votes | % |
|---|---|---|
| Pedro Passos Coelho | 17,521 | 88.89 |
| Total | 17,521 | |
| Valid votes | 17,521 | 88.89 |
| Invalid and blank ballots | 2,190 | 11.11 |
| Votes cast / turnout | 19,711 | 42.45 |
| Registered voters | 46,430 | |
Sources: Official results

Vote share
| Pedro Passos Coelho | 88.89% |
| Blank/Invalid | 11.11% |

== See also ==
- Social Democratic Party (Portugal)
- List of political parties in Portugal
- Elections in Portugal
