= 2016 Portuguese Social Democratic Party leadership election =

2016 Social Democratic Party leadership election
- 5 March 2016
- Turnout: 46.4% ▲3.9 pp
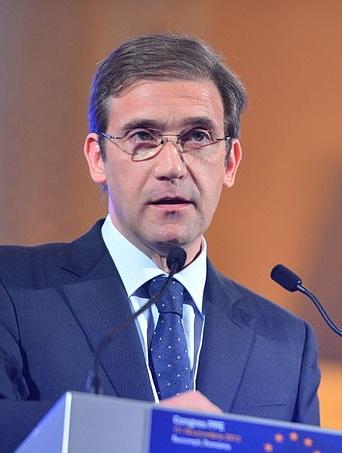
Candidate	Pedro Passos Coelho
Popular vote	22,276
Percentage	95.1%
Leader before election
Pedro Passos Coelho
Elected Leader
Pedro Passos Coelho

The 2016 Portuguese Social Democratic Party leadership election was held on 5 March 2016. Then PSD leader and former Prime Minister Pedro Passos Coelho ran for a 4th term as party leader and was the sole candidate in the race, thus winning with more than 90% of the votes.

== Candidates ==
=== Declared ===
Name	Born	Experience	Announcement date	Ref.
Pedro Passos Coelho	24 August 1964 (age 51); Coimbra	Social Democratic Youth leader (1990–1995); President of the Social Democratic Party (2010–2018); Prime Minister (2011–2015); Member of Parliament for Lisbon (1991–1999); (2015–2019); Member of Parliament for Vila Real (2011–2015)	4 February 2016	

=== Declined ===
- André Ventura – sports commentator.

== Opinion polling ==
Hypothetical polling

Polling firm	Fieldwork date	Sample size	Pedro Passos Coelho	Rui Rio	Manuela Ferreira Leite	Paulo Rangel	Others/ Undecided	Lead
Pitagórica	25–31 Jul 2014	504	14.1	44.6	13.3	5.8	17.5	30.5
Pitagórica	30 May–1 Jun 2014	504	15.4	42.7	13.4	4.3	20.9	27.3
Pitagórica	25–29 Mar 2014	506	11.8	50.6	10.6	4.9	18.9	38.8
Pitagórica	24 Feb–1 Mar 2014	506	16.2	45.8	13.1	6.2	16.2	29.6

== Results ==
Summary of the March 2016 PSD leadership election results
Candidate	5 March 2016	
Candidate	Votes	%
Pedro Passos Coelho	22,276	95.11
Total	22,276	
Valid votes	22,276	95.11
Invalid and blank ballots	1,146	4.89
Votes cast / turnout	23,422	46.36
Registered voters	50,518	
Sources: Official results

Vote share
Pedro Passos Coelho	95.11%
Blank/Invalid	4.89%

== See also ==
- Social Democratic Party (Portugal)
- List of political parties in Portugal
- Elections in Portugal
