= 2006 Portuguese Social Democratic Party leadership election =

2006 Social Democratic Party leadership election
- 5 May 2006
- Turnout: 37.3%
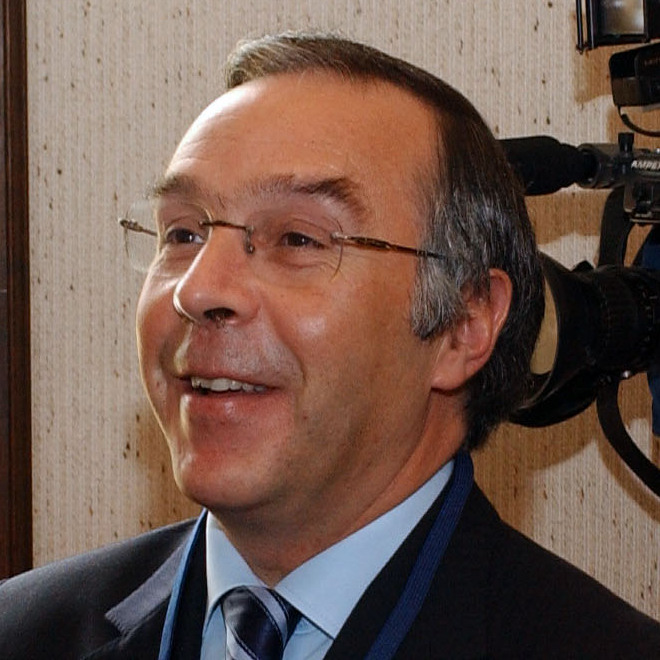
Candidate	Luís Marques Mendes
Popular vote	18,832
Percentage	90.9%
Leader before election
Luís Marques Mendes
Elected Leader
Luís Marques Mendes

The 2006 Portuguese Social Democratic Party leadership election was held on 5 May 2006. This was the first leadership election open to all party members, due to a change in the party's rules proposed by then party leader Luís Marques Mendes, elected in April 2005. Marques Mendes was the sole candidate, thus winning with more than 90% of the votes.

== Candidates ==
Name	Born	Experience	Announcement date	Ref.
Luís Marques Mendes	5 November 1957 (age 48); Guimarães	Minister in the Cabinet of the Prime Minister (1992–1995); Minister of Parliamentary Affairs (2002–2004); Member of Parliament for Braga (1987–1991); (1995–1999); Member of Parliament for Viana do Castelo (1991–1995); Member of Parliament for Aveiro (1999–2009); President of the Social Democratic Party (2005–2007)	April 2006	

== Results ==
Summary of the May 2006 PSD leadership election results
Candidate	5 May 2006	
Candidate	Votes	%
Luís Marques Mendes	18,832	90.92
Total	18,832	
Valid votes	18,832	90.92
Invalid and blank ballots	1,881	9.08
Votes cast / turnout	20,713	37.33
Registered voters	55,486	
Sources: Official results

Vote share
Luís Marques Mendes	90.92%
Blank/Invalid	9.08%

== See also ==
- Social Democratic Party (Portugal)
- List of political parties in Portugal
- Elections in Portugal
