= President of the Social Democratic Party (Portugal) =

Leader of a political party

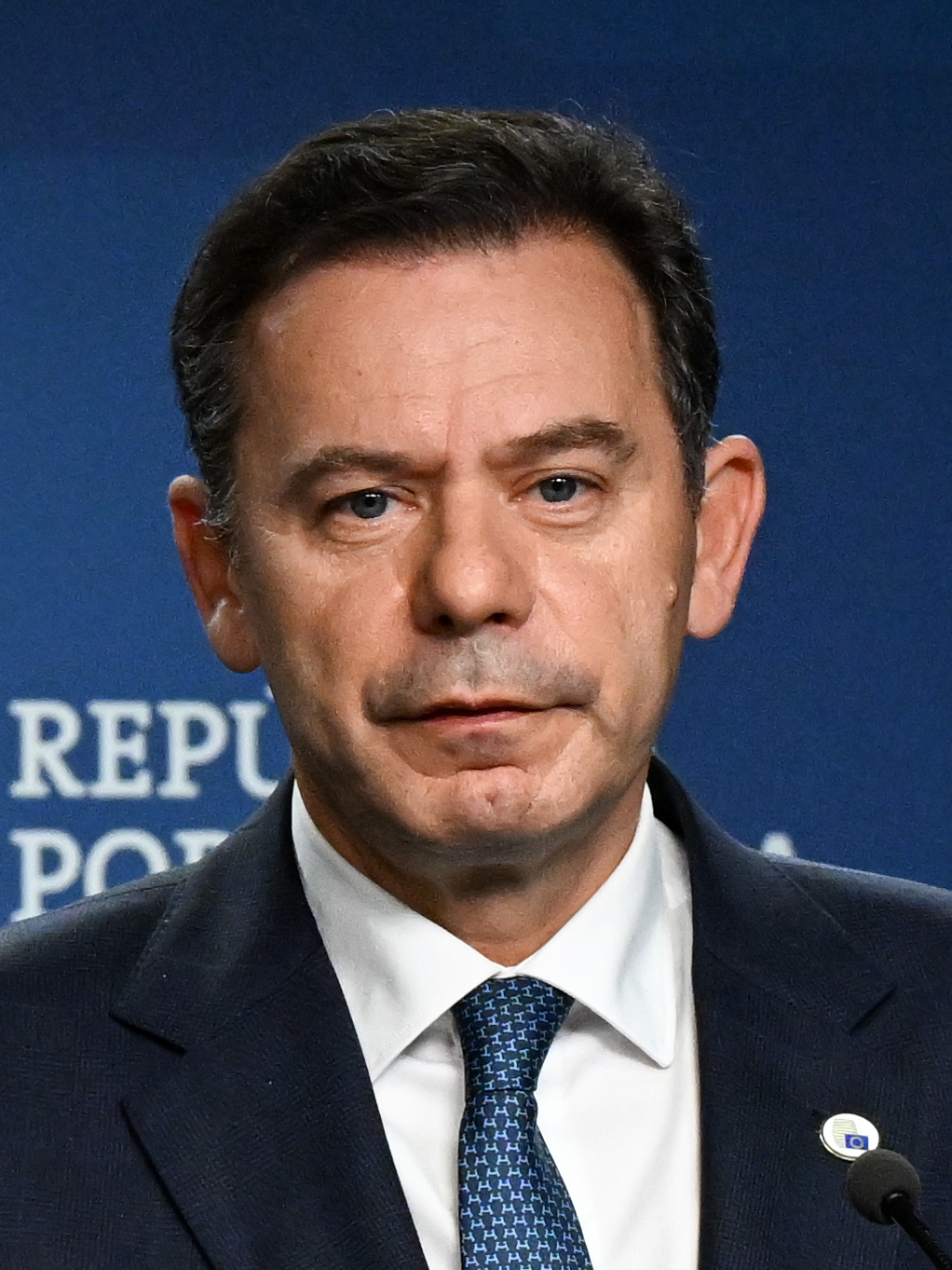
- Incumbent; Luís Montenegro since 1 July 2022
- Status: Party leader
- Precursor: Secretary-General of the Social Democratic Party (as party leader)
- Inaugural holder: Francisco Sá Carneiro
- Formation: 31 October 1976

The president of the Social Democratic Party is highest position within the Portuguese Social Democratic Party (PSD). The current holder is Luís Montenegro, who was elected to the position on 1 July 2022 after his victory in the 28 May 2022 leadership election, being also the current prime minister.

From the party's foundation to the 3rd Congress in October 1976, the most important position in the party was that of secretary-general, but after the 3rd Congress the post of president was created and the secretary-general became the second most important position within the party.

Between 1976 and 2005, party presidents were elected by delegate votes in a party congress, but in 2006, party rules were changed and registered party members, with membership fees updated, gained the right to elect the president instead of delegates in a congress. In 2012, another change to the rules introduced the possibility of a second round if no candidate obtains more than 50% of the votes in the first round of voting.

To this day, seven presidents of the Social Democratic Party have become prime ministers while being the leader of the PSD: Francisco Sá Carneiro in 1979, Francisco Pinto Balsemão in 1981, Aníbal Cavaco Silva in 1985, Durão Barroso in 2002, Pedro Santana Lopes in 2004, Pedro Passos Coelho in 2011 and Luís Montenegro in 2024. In addition, Aníbal Cavaco Silva held the presidency of the Republic from 2006 to 2016, and Marcelo Rebelo de Sousa, also former party president, is the current president of the Republic since 2016.

== List of presidents of the Social Democratic Party ==
Colour key
(for political parties)
Social Democratic Party (PSD)
Socialist Party (PS)
CDS – People's Party (CDS)
Independent
Interim holder

#	Portrait	Name	Constituency	Term in office		Election	Prime Minister	Ref.
#	Portrait	Name	Constituency	Start	End	Election	Prime Minister	Ref.
1		Francisco Sá Carneiro (1934–1980)	Porto (1975–1980); Lisbon (1980)	31 October 1976	11 November 1977	1976	Mário Soares (1976–1978)	
2		António de Sousa Franco (1942–2004)	Lisbon	11 November 1977	15 April 1978	Jan. 1978	Mário Soares (1976–1978)	
3		José Menéres Pimentel (1928–2014)	Lisbon	15 April 1978	2 July 1978	–	Mário Soares (1976–1978)	
3		José Menéres Pimentel (1928–2014)	Lisbon	15 April 1978	2 July 1978	–	Alfredo Nobre da Costa (1978)	
3		José Menéres Pimentel (1928–2014)	Lisbon	15 April 1978	2 July 1978	–	Carlos Mota Pinto (1978–1979)	
4		Francisco Sá Carneiro (1934–1980)	Porto (1975–1980); Lisbon (1980)	2 July 1978	4 December 1980	Jul. 1978	Carlos Mota Pinto (1978–1979)	
4		Francisco Sá Carneiro (1934–1980)	Porto (1975–1980); Lisbon (1980)	2 July 1978	4 December 1980	1979	Maria de Lourdes Pintasilgo (1979–1980)	
4		Francisco Sá Carneiro (1934–1980)	Porto (1975–1980); Lisbon (1980)	2 July 1978	4 December 1980	1979	himself (1980)	
–		Leonardo Ribeiro de Almeida (interim) (1936–1985)	Santarém (1975–1985); Lisbon (1987–1991); Santarém (1991–1995)	4 December 1980	13 December 1980	–	Diogo Freitas do Amaral (1980–1981)	
5		Francisco Pinto Balsemão (1937–2025)	Lisbon (1975–1976); Porto (1976–1983); Lisbon (1983–1985)	13 December 1980	27 February 1983	1980	Diogo Freitas do Amaral (1980–1981)	
5		Francisco Pinto Balsemão (1937–2025)	Lisbon (1975–1976); Porto (1976–1983); Lisbon (1983–1985)	13 December 1980	27 February 1983	1980	himself (1981–1983)	
5		Francisco Pinto Balsemão (1937–2025)	Lisbon (1975–1976); Porto (1976–1983); Lisbon (1983–1985)	13 December 1980	27 February 1983	1981	himself (1981–1983)	
6		Nuno Rodrigues dos Santos (1910–1984)	Lisbon	27 February 1983	25 March 1984	1983	Francisco Pinto Balsemão (1983)	
6		Nuno Rodrigues dos Santos (1910–1984)	Lisbon	27 February 1983	25 March 1984	1983	Mário Soares (1983–1985)	
7		Carlos Mota Pinto (1936–1985)	Coimbra	25 March 1984	10 February 1985	1984	Mário Soares (1983–1985)	
8		Rui Machete (b. 1940)	Setúbal (1976–1979); Lisbon (1985–1995)	10 February 1985	19 May 1985	–	Mário Soares (1983–1985)	
9		Aníbal Cavaco Silva (b. 1939)	Lisbon	19 May 1985	19 February 1995	1985	Mário Soares (1983–1985)	
9		Aníbal Cavaco Silva (b. 1939)	Lisbon	19 May 1985	19 February 1995	1985	himself (1985–1995)	
9		Aníbal Cavaco Silva (b. 1939)	Lisbon	19 May 1985	19 February 1995	1986	himself (1985–1995)	
9		Aníbal Cavaco Silva (b. 1939)	Lisbon	19 May 1985	19 February 1995	1988	himself (1985–1995)	
9		Aníbal Cavaco Silva (b. 1939)	Lisbon	19 May 1985	19 February 1995	1990	himself (1985–1995)	
9		Aníbal Cavaco Silva (b. 1939)	Lisbon	19 May 1985	19 February 1995	1992	himself (1985–1995)	
10		Fernando Nogueira (b. 1950)	Porto	19 February 1995	31 March 1996	1995	Aníbal Cavaco Silva (1995)	
10		Fernando Nogueira (b. 1950)	Porto	19 February 1995	31 March 1996	1995	António Guterres (1995–2002)	
11		Marcelo Rebelo de Sousa (b. 1948)	Lisbon	31 March 1996	2 May 1999	1996	António Guterres (1995–2002)	
11		Marcelo Rebelo de Sousa (b. 1948)	Lisbon	31 March 1996	2 May 1999	1998	António Guterres (1995–2002)	
12		José Manuel Durão Barroso (b. 1956)	Lisbon (1985–1987); Viseu (1987–1995); Lisbon (1995–2004)	2 May 1999	30 June 2004	1999	António Guterres (1995–2002)	
12		José Manuel Durão Barroso (b. 1956)	Lisbon (1985–1987); Viseu (1987–1995); Lisbon (1995–2004)	2 May 1999	30 June 2004	2000	António Guterres (1995–2002)	
12		José Manuel Durão Barroso (b. 1956)	Lisbon (1985–1987); Viseu (1987–1995); Lisbon (1995–2004)	2 May 1999	30 June 2004	2002	himself (2002–2004)	
12		José Manuel Durão Barroso (b. 1956)	Lisbon (1985–1987); Viseu (1987–1995); Lisbon (1995–2004)	2 May 1999	30 June 2004	May 2004	himself (2002–2004)	
13		Pedro Santana Lopes (b. 1956)	Lisbon (1980–1995); Coimbra (1999–2002); Lisbon (2005–2009)	30 June 2004	8 April 2005	Jul. 2004	himself (2004–2005)	
13		Pedro Santana Lopes (b. 1956)	Lisbon (1980–1995); Coimbra (1999–2002); Lisbon (2005–2009)	30 June 2004	8 April 2005	Jul. 2004	José Sócrates (2005–2011)	
14		Luís Marques Mendes (b. 1957)	Braga (1987–1991); Viana do Castelo (1991–1995); Braga (1995–1999); Aveiro (1999–2009)	8 April 2005	12 October 2007	2005	José Sócrates (2005–2011)	
14		Luís Marques Mendes (b. 1957)	Braga (1987–1991); Viana do Castelo (1991–1995); Braga (1995–1999); Aveiro (1999–2009)	8 April 2005	12 October 2007	2006	José Sócrates (2005–2011)	
15		Luís Filipe Menezes (b. 1953)	Porto	12 October 2007	20 July 2008	2007	José Sócrates (2005–2011)	
16		Manuela Ferreira Leite (b. 1940)	Évora (1995–1999); Lisbon (1999–2011)	20 July 2008	9 April 2010	2008	José Sócrates (2005–2011)	
17		Pedro Passos Coelho (b. 1964)	Lisbon (1991–1999); Vila Real (2011–2015); Lisbon (2015–2018)	9 April 2010	16 February 2018	2010	José Sócrates (2005–2011)	
17		Pedro Passos Coelho (b. 1964)	Lisbon (1991–1999); Vila Real (2011–2015); Lisbon (2015–2018)	9 April 2010	16 February 2018	2012	himself (2011–2015)	
17		Pedro Passos Coelho (b. 1964)	Lisbon (1991–1999); Vila Real (2011–2015); Lisbon (2015–2018)	9 April 2010	16 February 2018	2014	himself (2011–2015)	
17		Pedro Passos Coelho (b. 1964)	Lisbon (1991–1999); Vila Real (2011–2015); Lisbon (2015–2018)	9 April 2010	16 February 2018	2016	António Costa (2015–2024)	
18		Rui Rio (b. 1957)	Porto	16 February 2018	1 July 2022	2018	António Costa (2015–2024)	
18		Rui Rio (b. 1957)	Porto	16 February 2018	1 July 2022	2020	António Costa (2015–2024)	
18		Rui Rio (b. 1957)	Porto	16 February 2018	1 July 2022	2021	António Costa (2015–2024)	
19		Luís Montenegro (b. 1973)	Aveiro (2005–2018); Lisbon (2024–2025); Aveiro (since 2025)	1 July 2022	Incumbent	2022	António Costa (2015–2024)	
19		Luís Montenegro (b. 1973)	Aveiro (2005–2018); Lisbon (2024–2025); Aveiro (since 2025)	1 July 2022	Incumbent	2024	himself (since 2024)	
19		Luís Montenegro (b. 1973)	Aveiro (2005–2018); Lisbon (2024–2025); Aveiro (since 2025)	1 July 2022	Incumbent	2026	himself (since 2024)	

=== By time in office ===
#	Name	Time in office	Duration
1	Aníbal Cavaco Silva	1985–1995	9 years, 276 days
2	Pedro Passos Coelho	2010–2018	7 years, 313 days
3	José Manuel Durão Barroso	1999–2004	5 years, 59 days
4	Rui Rio	2018–2022	4 years, 135 days
5	Luís Montenegro	2022–present	4 years, 68 days (Incumbent)
6	Francisco Sá Carneiro	1976–1977; 1978–1980	3 years, 166 days
7	Marcelo Rebelo de Sousa	1996–1999	3 years, 32 days
8	Luís Marques Mendes	2005–2007	2 years, 187 days
9	Francisco Pinto Balsemão	1980–1983	2 years, 86 days
10	Manuela Ferreira Leite	2008–2010	1 year, 263 days
11	Fernando Nogueira	1995–1996	1 year, 41 days
12	Nuno Rodrigues dos Santos	1983–1984	1 year, 27 days
13	Carlos Mota Pinto	1984–1985	322 days
14	Luís Filipe Menezes	2007–2008	282 days
15	Pedro Santana Lopes	2004–2005	282 days
16	António de Sousa Franco	1977–1978	155 days
17	Rui Machete	1985	98 days
18	José Menéres Pimentel	1978	78 days
19	Leonardo Ribeiro de Almeida (interim)	1980	9 days

== List of secretaries-general of the Social Democratic Party ==
=== As leaders of the party (1974–1976) ===
#	Portrait	Name	Constituency	Term in office		Prime Minister	Ref.
#	Portrait	Name	Constituency	Start	End	Prime Minister	Ref.
1		Francisco Sá Carneiro (1934–1980)	Porto (1975–1980); Lisbon (1980)	24 November 1974	25 May 1975	Vasco Gonçalves (1974–1975)	
2		Emídio Guerreiro (1899–2005)	Porto	25 May 1975	28 September 1975	Vasco Gonçalves (1974–1975)	
2		Emídio Guerreiro (1899–2005)	Porto	25 May 1975	28 September 1975	José Pinheiro de Azevedo (1975–1976)	
3		Francisco Sá Carneiro (1934–1980)	Porto (1975–1980); Lisbon (1980)	28 September 1975	31 October 1976	José Pinheiro de Azevedo (1975–1976)	
3		Francisco Sá Carneiro (1934–1980)	Porto (1975–1980); Lisbon (1980)	28 September 1975	31 October 1976	Mário Soares (1976–1978)	

=== As second in command (1976–present) ===
#	Name	Took office	Left office	Party President	Ref.
4	Joaquim Magalhães Mota	31 October 1976	29 January 1978	Francisco Sá Carneiro	
4	Joaquim Magalhães Mota	31 October 1976	29 January 1978	António Sousa Franco	
5	José Sérvulo Correia	29 January 1978	2 July 1978	António Sousa Franco	
5	José Sérvulo Correia	29 January 1978	2 July 1978	José Menéres Pimentel	
6	Amândio de Azevedo	2 July 1978	17 July 1979	Francisco Sá Carneiro	
7	António Capucho	17 July 1979	25 March 1984	Francisco Sá Carneiro	
7	António Capucho	17 July 1979	25 March 1984	Francisco Pinto Balsemão	
7	António Capucho	17 July 1979	25 March 1984	Nuno Rodrigues dos Santos	
8	Francisco Antunes da Silva	25 March 1984	19 May 1985	Carlos Mota Pinto	
8	Francisco Antunes da Silva	25 March 1984	19 May 1985	Rui Machete	
9	Manuel Dias Loureiro	19 May 1985	8 April 1990	Aníbal Cavaco Silva	
10	José Falcão e Cunha	8 April 1990	15 November 1992	Aníbal Cavaco Silva	
11	José Nunes Liberato	15 November 1992	19 February 1995	Aníbal Cavaco Silva	
12	Eduardo Azevedo Soares	19 February 1995	31 March 1996	Fernando Nogueira	
13	Rui Rio	31 March 1996	20 June 1997	Marcelo Rebelo de Sousa	
14	Carlos Horta e Costa	20 June 1997	19 April 1998	Marcelo Rebelo de Sousa	
15	António Capucho	19 April 1998	17 January 1999	Marcelo Rebelo de Sousa	
16	Artur Torres Pereira	17 January 1999	2 May 1999	Marcelo Rebelo de Sousa	
16	Artur Torres Pereira	17 January 1999	2 May 1999	José Manuel Durão Barroso	
17	José Luís Arnaut	2 May 1999	23 May 2004	José Manuel Durão Barroso	
18	Miguel Relvas	23 May 2004	10 April 2005	José Manuel Durão Barroso	
18	Miguel Relvas	23 May 2004	10 April 2005	Pedro Santana Lopes	
19	Miguel Macedo	10 April 2005	14 October 2007	Pedro Santana Lopes	
19	Miguel Macedo	10 April 2005	14 October 2007	Luís Marques Mendes	
20	José Ribau Esteves	14 October 2007	22 June 2008	Luís Filipe Menezes	
21	Luís Marques Guedes	22 June 2008	11 April 2010	Manuela Ferreira Leite	
22	Miguel Relvas	11 April 2010	12 July 2011	Pedro Passos Coelho	
23	José Matos Rosa	12 July 2011	18 February 2018	Pedro Passos Coelho	
24	Feliciano Barreiras Duarte	18 February 2018	19 March 2018	Rui Rio	
25	José Silvano	19 March 2018	3 July 2022	Rui Rio	
26	Hugo Soares	3 July 2022	present	Luís Montenegro	
