= 2026 Portuguese Social Democratic Party leadership election =

Party election in Portugal

2026 Social Democratic Party leadership election
- 30 May 2026
- Turnout: 26.8% ▼12.9 pp
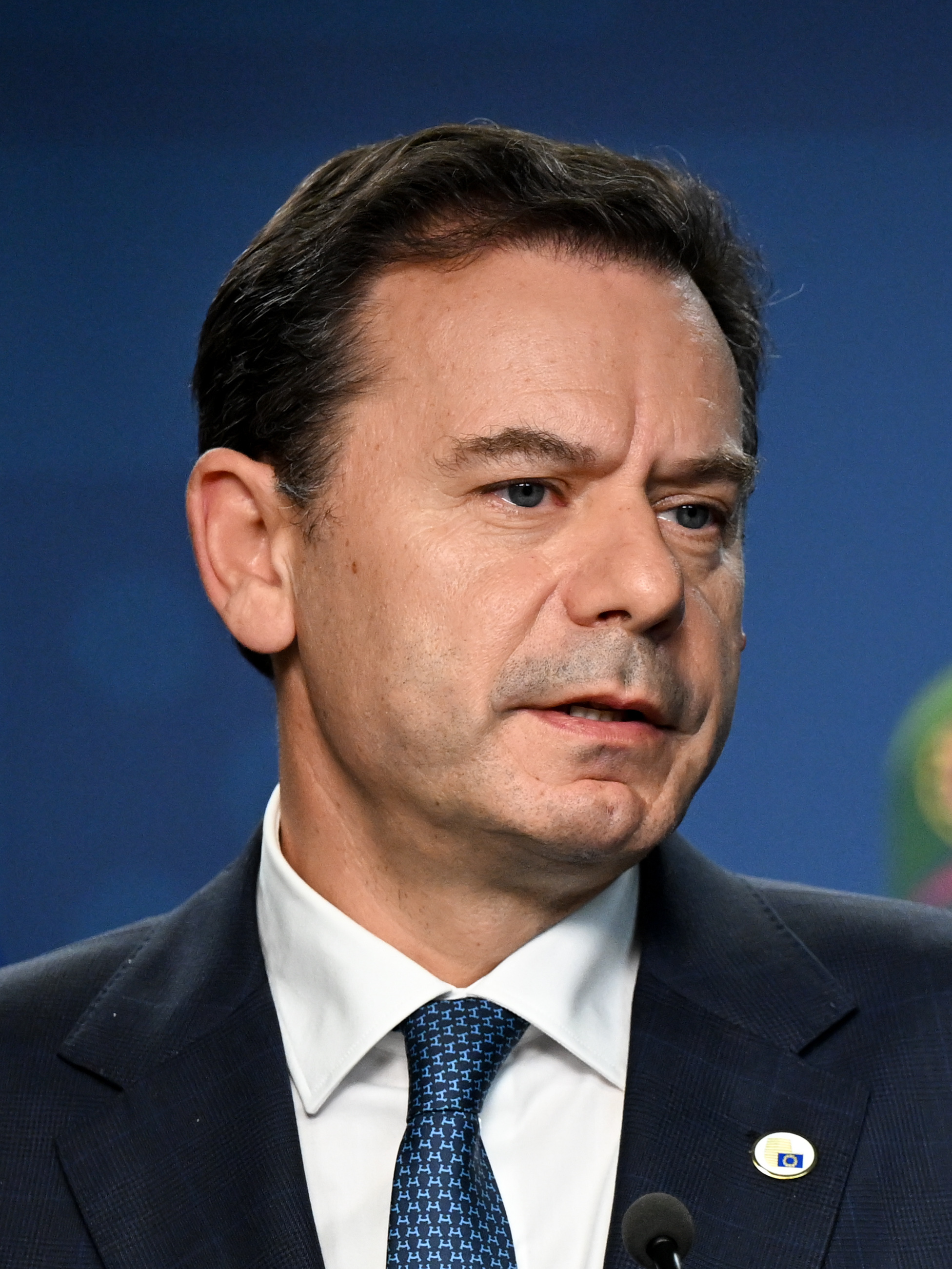
Candidate	Luís Montenegro
Popular vote	14,467
Percentage	94.8%
Leader before election
Luís Montenegro
Elected Leader
Luís Montenegro

The 2026 Portuguese Social Democratic Party leadership election was held on 30 May 2026. A national party congress will be held on 20 and 21 June in Anadia. In this election, all active party members (those who have paid at least one membership fee in the last 2 years) were eligible to cast a ballot, as previously only members with all fees paid were eligible.

Incumbent party leader, and Prime Minister Luís Montenegro had confirmed his intention to run for another term, while former leader and Prime Minister Pedro Passos Coelho, who has been quite critical of Montenegro's leadership and premiership, was the subject of media speculation about a possible candidacy for the leadership. Despite that, he announced that he wasn't going to be a candidate in this election, however leaving the door open for a future candidacy in another election.

Montenegro was the sole candidate to this election, and was re-elected with nearly 95% of the votes, albeit with a very low turnout rate of less than 27% of party members, the lowest share till date in a PSD leadership election.

== Candidates ==
Name	Born	Experience	Announcement date	Ref.
Luís Montenegro	16 February 1973 (age 53); Porto	Prime Minister (since 2024); President of the Social Democratic Party (since 2022); Member of Parliament for Aveiro (since 2025; also 2005–2017); Leader of the Social Democratic Parliamentary Caucus (2011–2017); Member of Parliament for Lisbon (2024–2025)	4 March 2026	

=== Declined ===
- Pedro Passos Coelho – former Prime Minister (2011–2015); former Social Democratic Party leader (2010–2018).

== Opinion polling ==
Hypothetical polling

Replacement prime ministerial candidate in the 2025 legislative election

Polling firm	Fieldwork date	Sample size	Pedro Passos Coelho	Paulo Rangel	Carlos Moedas	Leonor Beleza	Paulo Macedo	Others/ Undecided	Lead
Intercampus	11–13 Mar 2025	600	22.9	13.3	13.1	11.2	10.7	28.8	9.6

== Results ==
Summary of the May 2026 PSD leadership election results
Candidate	30 May 2026	
Candidate	Votes	%
Luís Montenegro	14,468	94.80
Total	14,468	
Valid votes	14,467	94.80
Invalid and blank ballots	794	5.20
Votes cast / turnout	15,261	26.84
Registered voters	56,868	

Vote share
Luís Montenegro	94.80%
Blank/Invalid	5.20%

== See also ==
- Elections in Portugal
- List of political parties in Portugal
