= 2024 Portuguese Social Democratic Party leadership election =

2024 Social Democratic Party leadership election
- 6 September 2024
- Turnout: 39.7% ▼20.8 pp
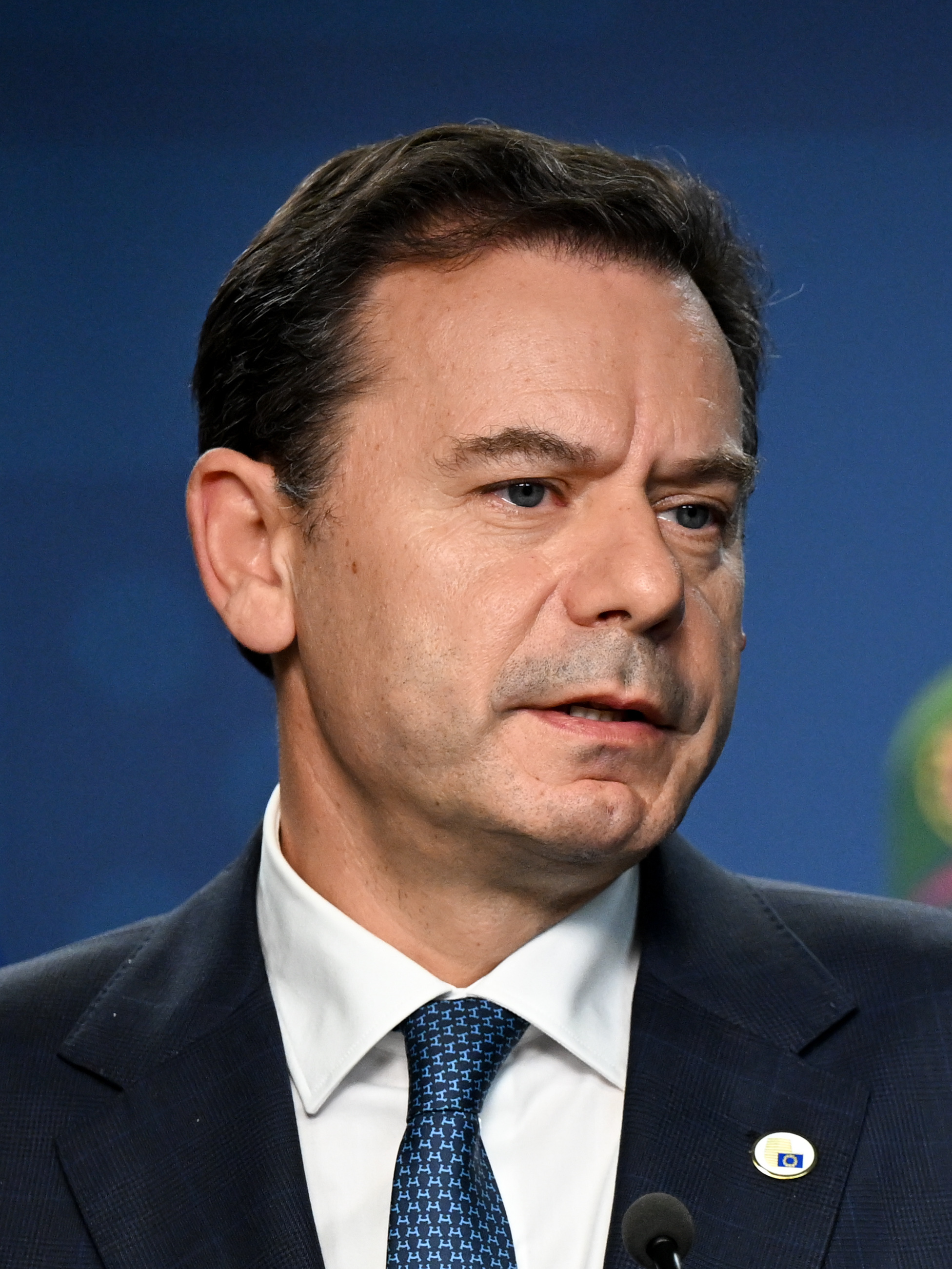
Candidate	Luís Montenegro
Popular vote	16,198
Percentage	97.5%
Leader before election
Luís Montenegro
Elected Leader
Luís Montenegro

The 2024 Portuguese Social Democratic Party leadership election was held on 6 September 2024, with a party national congress that was expected to be held in Braga on 21 and 22 September 2024, but it was postponed to 19 and 20 October 2024 due to the September 2024 wildfire crisis. This leadership election was held with Luís Montenegro holding the office of Prime Minister, following his win in the 2024 March early legislative election.

Luís Montenegro, who faced some speculation about potential leadership challenges before his election as Prime Minister, was the sole candidate on the ballot, with around 42,000 party members registered to vote, just 47 percent of the more than 90,000 active party members. Luís Montenegro was re-elected as party leader with 97.5 percent of all votes cast, including blank and invalid ballots, with a low turnout of just under 40 percent.

== Candidates ==
Name	Born	Experience	Announcement date	Ref.
Luís Montenegro	16 February 1973 (age 51); Porto	Prime Minister (since 2024); President of the Social Democratic Party (since 2022); Member of Parliament for Lisbon (2024–2025); Leader of the Social Democratic Parliamentary Caucus (2011–2017); Member of Parliament for Aveiro (2002–2017)	9 October 2023	

=== Declined ===
- Carlos Moedas – Mayor of Lisbon (since 2021); former European Commissioner for Research, Science and Innovation (2014–2019)
- Pedro Passos Coelho – former Prime Minister (2011–2015); former Social Democratic Party leader (2010–2018)

== Opinion polls ==
Hypothetical polling

All voters

Polling firm	Fieldwork date	Sample size	Luís Montenegro	Carlos Moedas	Pedro Passos Coelho	Others/ Undecided	Lead
CESOP–UCP	15–24 Nov 2023	1,102	18.0	24.0	37.0	21.0	13.0
Aximage	8–9 Nov 2023	516	25.0	18.0	24.8	32.2	0.2
Intercampus	7–11 Aug 2023	607	23.9	35.7	—N/a	40.4	11.8
Intercampus	7–11 Aug 2023	607	13.8	26.2	32.8	27.2	6.6

PSD voters

Polling firm	Fieldwork date	Sample size	Luís Montenegro	Carlos Moedas	Pedro Passos Coelho	Others/ Undecided	Lead
CESOP–UCP	15–24 Nov 2023	1,102	15.0	19.0	57.0	9.0	38.0

== Results ==
Summary of the September 2024 PSD leadership election results
Candidate	6 September 2024	
Candidate	Votes	%
Luís Montenegro	16,198	97.46
Total	16,198	
Valid votes	16,198	97.46
Invalid and blank ballots	423	2.54
Votes cast / turnout	16,621	39.70
Registered voters	41,863	

Vote share
Luís Montenegro	97.46%
Blank/Invalid	2.54%

== See also ==
- Elections in Portugal
- List of political parties in Portugal
