= 2007 Portuguese Social Democratic Party leadership election =

2007 Social Democratic Party leadership election
- 28 September 2007
- Turnout: 62.4% ▲25.1 pp
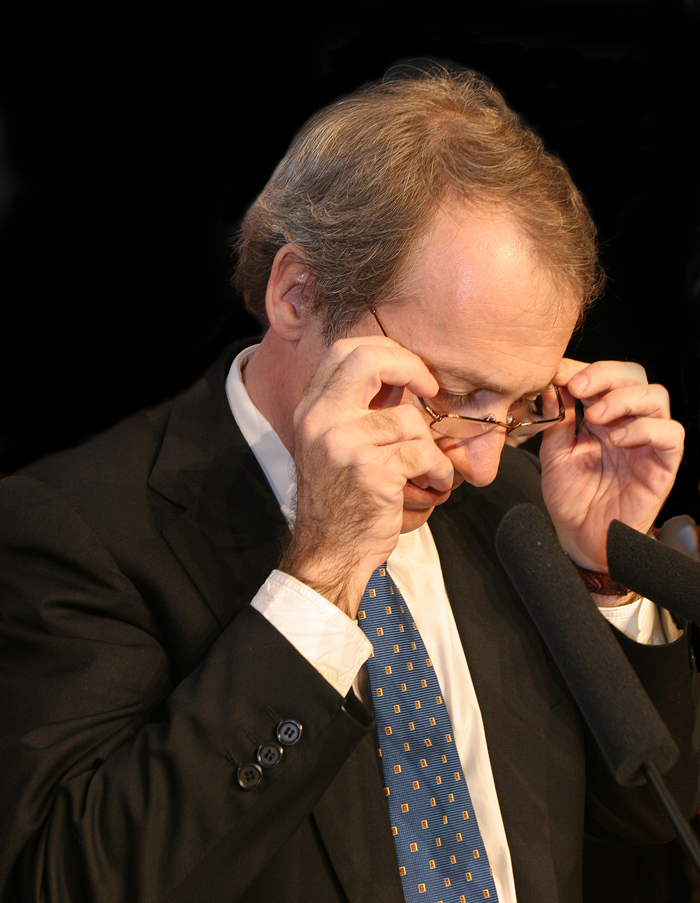

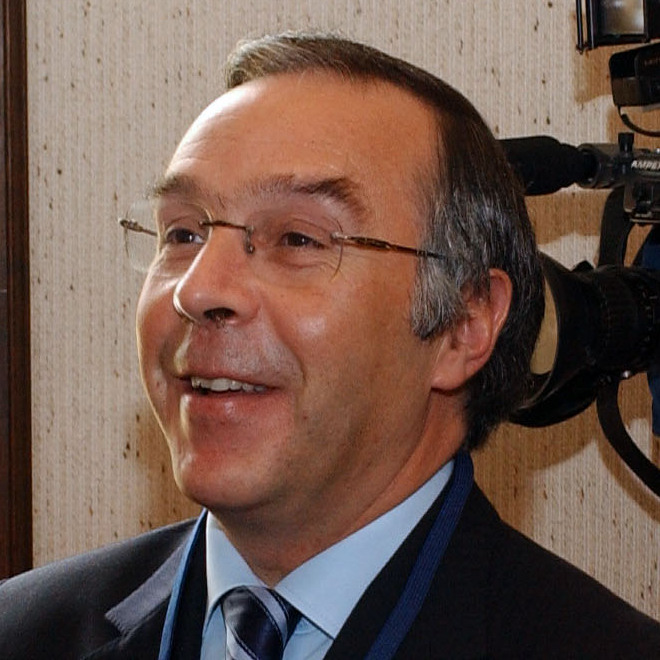
Candidate	Luís Filipe Menezes	Luís Marques Mendes
Popular vote	21,101	16,973
Percentage	53.6%	43.1%
Leader before election
Luís Marques Mendes
Elected Leader
Luís Filipe Menezes

The 2007 Portuguese Social Democratic Party leadership election was held on 28 September 2007. This was a snap leadership election called by then party leader Luís Marques Mendes, elected in April 2005. Marques Mendes triggered the snap leadership ballot after the PSD bad result in the July 2007 Lisbon mayoral by-election, in which the PSD candidate, Fernando Negrão, polled 3rd place with just 16% of the votes. Marques Mendes decided to run for reelection and faced Luís Filipe Menezes in the leadership ballot. On election day, Menezes defeated Marques Mendes by a 54% to 43% margin and was elected as the new leader of the PSD.

Menezes leadership was, however, very short and in April 2008 he announced his resignation and exit from the leadership.

== Candidates ==
Name	Born	Experience	Announcement date	Ref.
Luís Marques Mendes	5 November 1957 (age 49); Guimarães	Deputy Prime Minister (1992–1995); Minister of Parliamentary Affairs (2002–2004); Member of Parliament for Braga (1987–1991); (1995–1999); Member of Parliament for Viana do Castelo (1991–1995); Member of Parliament for Aveiro (1999–2009); President of the Social Democratic Party (2005–2007)	16 July 2007	
Luís Filipe Menezes	2 November 1953 (age 53); Ovar	Member of Parliament for Porto (1987–1995); Mayor of Vila Nova de Gaia (1997–2013)	24 July 2007	

== Results ==
Summary of the September 2007 PSD leadership election results
Candidate	28 September 2007	
Candidate	Votes	%
Luís Filipe Menezes	21,101	53.62
Luís Marques Mendes	16,973	43.14
Total	38,074	
Valid votes	38,074	96.75
Invalid and blank ballots	1,279	3.25
Votes cast / turnout	39,353	62.42
Registered voters	63,042	
Sources: Official results

Vote share
Luís Filipe Menezes	53.62%
Luís Marques Mendes	43.13%
Blank/Invalid	3.25%

== See also ==
- Social Democratic Party (Portugal)
- List of political parties in Portugal
- Elections in Portugal
