= 2012 Portuguese Social Democratic Party leadership election =

2012 Social Democratic Party leadership election
- 3 March 2012
- Turnout: 40.2% ▼26.1 pp
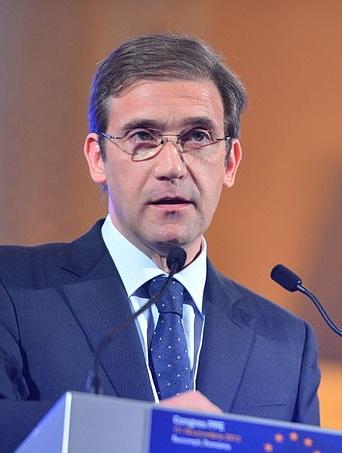
Candidate	Pedro Passos Coelho
Popular vote	20,266
Percentage	94.7%
Leader before election
Pedro Passos Coelho
Elected Leader
Pedro Passos Coelho

The 2012 Portuguese Social Democratic Party leadership election was held on 3 March 2012. Then PSD leader and Prime Minister Pedro Passos Coelho ran for a 2nd term as party leader and was the sole candidate in the race, thus winning with almost 95% of the votes.

== Candidates ==
Name	Born	Experience	Announcement date	Ref.
Pedro Passos Coelho	24 August 1964 (age 47); Coimbra	Social Democratic Youth leader (1990–1995); President of the Social Democratic Party (2010–2018); Prime Minister (2011–2015); Member of Parliament for Lisbon (1991–1999); Member of Parliament for Vila Real (2011–2015)	22 February 2012	

=== Withdrew ===
- Nuno Miguel Henriques;

== Results ==
Summary of the March 2012 PSD leadership election results
Candidate	3 March 2012	
Candidate	Votes	%
Pedro Passos Coelho	20,266	94.65
Total	20,266	
Valid votes	20,266	94.65
Invalid and blank ballots	1,146	5.35
Votes cast / turnout	21,412	40.20
Registered voters	53,270	
Sources: Official results

Vote share
Pedro Passos Coelho	94.65%
Blank/Invalid	5.35%

== See also ==
- Social Democratic Party (Portugal)
- List of political parties in Portugal
- Elections in Portugal
