= Eduardo Catroga =

Portuguese economist (born 1942)

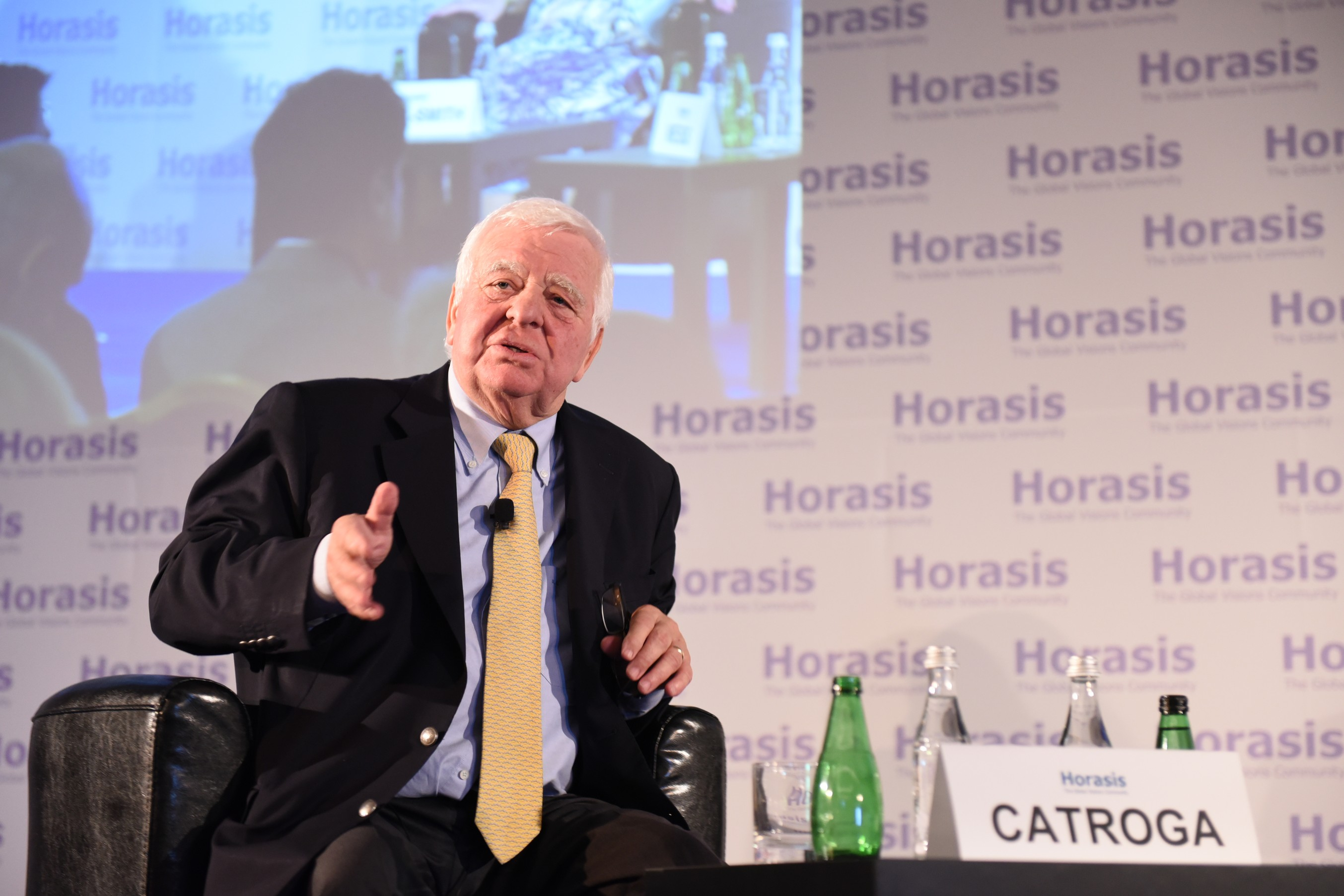
Eduardo Catroga in 2017.

Eduardo Catroga, is a Portuguese economist and former Minister of Finance for two years during the Aníbal Cavaco Silva's PSD government between 1993 and 1995. After had been an employee of Companhia União Fabril (CUF) before the Carnation Revolution of 1974, he co-founded in Lisbon with José Bento dos Santos, the metal brokerage and trading company Quimibro. Pedro Passos Coelho, that would become Prime Minister of Portugal in 2011, was invited to work there during the late 1980s.
