= José Manuel Bento dos Santos =

Portuguese gastronomer, businessman, chemical engineer (born 1947)

José Manuel Bento dos Santos (born 1947) is a Portuguese cook, gastronomer, businessman, trader, metals broker, writer and chemical engineer. Bento dos Santos studied chemical-industrial engineering at the Instituto Superior Técnico (IST), Technical University of Lisbon. During his early university years he played rugby union and was also the manager of the Portugal national rugby team in 1967/1968. He started his professional career as an employee of Companhia União Fabril (CUF), the largest Portuguese business conglomerate before the Carnation Revolution in 1974. During the turmoil of the revolution, indeed a left-wing military coup, CUF was forcibly nationalized by the revolutionary government and collapsed. Bento dos Santos, together with other partners such as Eduardo Catroga, founded the metals brokerage and trading company Quimibro. In the late 1980s, Pedro Passos Coelho, future Prime Minister of Portugal, was invited by a cousin to work there as a collaborator. Bento dos Santos studied also economics at the Instituto Superior de Economia e Gestão of the Technical University of Lisbon, but he did not graduate. Beyond Quimibro, Bento dos Santos founded other ventures like Quinta do Monte d'Oiro, a winery. In the 2000s, Bento dos Santos became popular due to his cuisine progames O Sentido do Gosto (2007) on the Portuguese television RTP and Segredos do Vinho (SIC, 2004). He also published a book of cuisine with the title O Sentido do Gosto as well as Subtilezas Gastronómicas – receitas à volta de um vinho (Assírio & Alvim, 2005). He is affiliated with the International Gastronomy Academy, the Confrérie de la Chaîne des Rôtisseurs, the Confraria do Vinho do Porto, the Académie des Psycologues du Goût, and is a chevalier of both des Entonneurs Rabelaisiens and du Tastevin.
