= António Bagão Félix =

Portuguese economist and politician (born 1948)

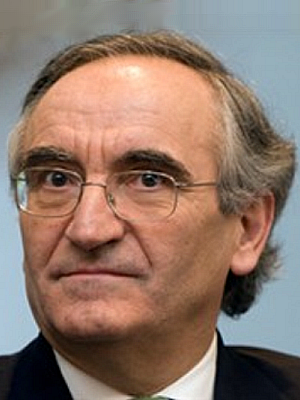

Minister of Finance
- In office 17 July 2004 – 12 March 2005
- Prime Minister: Pedro Santana Lopes
- Preceded by: Manuela Ferreira Leite
- Succeeded by: Luís Campos e Cunha

Minister of Social Security and Labour
- In office 6 April 2002 – 17 July 2004
- Prime Minister: José Manuel Barroso
- Preceded by: Paulo Pedroso
- Succeeded by: Álvaro Barreto

Personal details
- Born: 9 April 1948 (age 78) Ílhavo, Portugal
- Profession: Politician

Military service
- Allegiance: Portugal
- Branch/service: Portuguese Navy
- Years of service: 1970–1973

António José de Castro Bagão Félix (born 9 April 1948) is a Portuguese economist and politician.

== Education ==
Bagão Félix received his university degree in Finance from the Technical University of Lisbon's ISEG, formerly known as ISCEF (1970), and a diploma in management by INSEAD (Fontainebleau, 1995).

== Political life ==
Bagão Félix received administrative powers more than once. He took part in many governments formed in Portugal in his career.

Bagão Félix was the Deputy in the Assembleia da República, elected by the Association of London (1983–1985); he was the Deputy to the Parliamentary Assembly of the Council of Europe; and he was a member of its Committee on Social Affairs and Health in the same years. He has been active also in the anti-abortion movement.

== Publications ==
Félix is the author of several books and has joined the editorial boards of journals such as Citizenship, New Labor, Company, Hyphen Magazine, and Public Health. He is a columnist in several newspapers such as Público, Jornal de Negócios, Correio do Vouga, Voz da Verdade, Revista Cais and Boletim Salesiano, among others, and he participates in the radio program Board on Antena1.

=== Career highlights ===
- (1973–1976) financial director of Companhia de Seguros Mundial
- (1976–1979) member of the Management Board of Insurance Credit
- (1979–1980) member of the Council Board of the National Insurance Institute
- (1985–1987) director of the Bank of Commerce and Industry
- (1992–1993) director of the Bank of Portugal
- (1993–1994) Vice-Governor
- (1994–2002) Director-General of the Portuguese Commercial Bank

Additionally he served in various public institutions and social organizations.

- (1997–2002) Chairman of the supervisory board of the Bank Against Hunger
- (since 2001) Consultant to the Portuguese Episcopal Conference for Social Affairs and Ethical and board member of the SEATS (Association for Economic and Social Development).

Teaching in higher education:

- (1972–1973) teaching assistant in the Institute of Economic and Financial Sciences
- (1975–1976) teaching assistant Institute of Labor and Company
- (1986–1994) Assistant Professor in the International University (Lisbon)
- (since 1991) a member of the General Council of the University of Aveiro

== Government posts ==
- XV Constitutional Government
  - Minister of Social Security and Labor
- XVI Constitutional Government
  - Minister of Finance

== Personal life ==
Bagão Félix is a known member (sócio) and supporter of S.L. Benfica.
