= Luís Filipe Menezes =

Portuguese politician

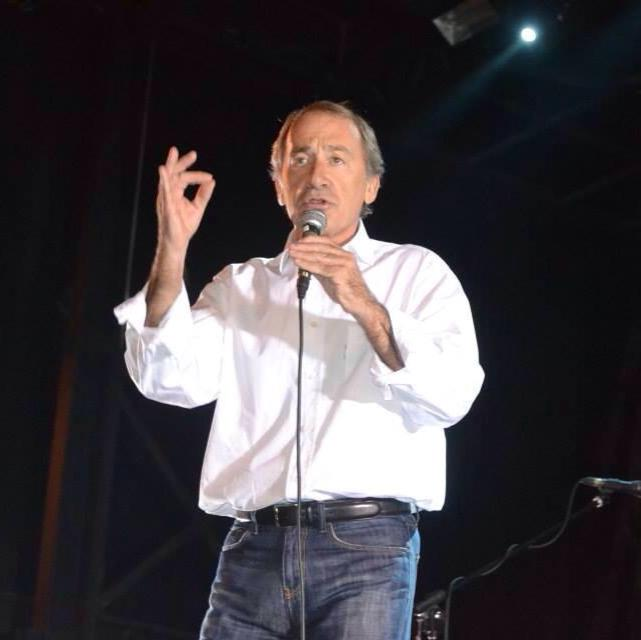

Mayor of Vila Nova de Gaia
- Incumbent
- Assumed office 12 October 2025
- Preceded by: Marina Mendes
- In office 14 January 1997 – 21 October 2013
- Preceded by: José Heitor Carvalheiras
- Succeeded by: Eduardo de Almeida Rodrigues

President of the Social Democratic Party
- In office 12 October 2007 – 20 June 2008
- Secretary-General: José Ribau Esteves
- Preceded by: Luís Marques Mendes
- Succeeded by: Manuela Ferreira Leite

Secretary of State for Parliamentary Affairs
- In office 5 November 1991 – 28 October 1995
- Prime Minister: Aníbal Cavaco Silva
- Preceded by: Carlos Encarnação
- Succeeded by: António Costa

President of the Social Democratic Party of the Porto District
- In office 1990–2002
- Preceded by: Mário Montalvão Machado
- Succeeded by: Marco António Costa

Member of the Assembly of the Republic
- In office 19 July 1987 – 13 January 1997
- Constituency: Porto

Member of the Porto City Council
- In office 22 October 2013 – 1 October 2017

Personal details
- Born: Luís Filipe de Menezes Lopes; 2 November 1953 (age 72) Ovar, Portugal
- Party: Social Democratic Party
- Spouse: Ana Luísa Caetano (m. 2015)
- Children: 4
- Education: University of Porto
- Occupation: Surgeon • Politician

Luís Filipe de Menezes Lopes (born 2 November 1953) is a Portuguese politician.

== Background ==
Luís Filipe Menezes is the son of José António Lopes, an industrialist, and Maria Helena de Menezes Borges, a high school teacher with a degree in Philosophy from the University of Porto.

== Career ==
He is a Licentiate in Medicine specialized in pediatrics from the Faculty of Medicine of the University of Porto.

He started his career as a medical doctor.

Affiliated with the Social Democratic Party (PSD), he was a Secretary of State for Parliamentary Affairs and from 1997 to 2013 he was Mayor of the Municipal Chamber of Vila Nova de Gaia (in Greater Porto subregion), one of the most populated Portuguese municipalities.

He was leader of the Social Democratic Party between 12 October 2007 and 20 June 2008. He was elected after Luís Marques Mendes and was succeeded by Manuela Ferreira Leite.

Meneses is considered a populist, his policies as mayor were equally populist and his victory over Marques Mendes is considered a victory of populism in the PSD, as there was a clear difference between the positions of both, having Meneses a more politically correct and pro-people position in most matters, although with a sightly neoliberal stance on the health care system, and a liberal conservative position towards gay rights.

Luis Filipe Menezes is considered as a modern politician. He had the best score in the Municipality elections of October 2009.

== Family ==
Luís Filipe Menezes is the son of José António Lopes and Maria Helena de Menezes Borges.

He has four children.

In 2015, he married lawyer Ana Luísa Caetano, with whom he has one son.

== Electoral history ==
=== Vila Nova de Gaia City Council election, 1997 ===
Ballot: 14 December 1997
Party	Candidate	Votes	%	Seats	+/−
PSD	Luís Filipe Menezes	64,044	46.7	6	+2
PS	José Carvalheiras	56,757	41.4	5	–1
CDU	–	10,151	7.4	0	–1
Other parties		1,878	1.4	0	±0
Blank/Invalid ballots		4,245	3.1	–	–
Turnout		137,075	61.78	11	±0
Source: Autárquicas 1997

=== Vila Nova de Gaia City Council election, 2001 ===
Ballot: 16 December 2001
Party	Candidate	Votes	%	Seats	+/−
PSD/CDS–PP	Luís Filipe Menezes	78,549	59.9	8	+2
PS	Jorge Strecht Ribeiro	37,078	28.3	3	–2
CDU	–	8,192	6.3	0	±0
BE	–	1,570	4.9	0	new
PH	–	601	4.9	0	new
Blank/Invalid ballots		4,460	3.4	–	–
Turnout		131,109	57.69	11	±0
Source: Autárquicas 2001

=== PSD leadership election, 2005 ===
Ballot: 9 April 2005
Candidate	Votes	%
Luís Marques Mendes	497	56.6
Luís Filipe Menezes	381	43.4
Turnout	878	
Source: PSD Congress

=== Vila Nova de Gaia City Council election, 2005 ===
Ballot: 9 October 2005
Party	Candidate	Votes	%	Seats	+/−
PSD/CDS–PP	Luís Filipe Menezes	77,971	55.0	7	–1
PS	Manuel Barbosa Ribeiro	39,657	28.0	3	±0
CDU	Ilda Figueiredo	11,781	8.3	1	+1
BE	Alda Sousa	5,327	3.8	0	±0
Other parties		1,486	1.1	0	±0
Blank/Invalid ballots		5,616	4.0	–	–
Turnout		141,838	60.73	11	±0
Source: Autárquicas 2005Autárquicas 2005

=== PSD leadership election, 2007 ===
Ballot: 28 September 2007
Candidate	Votes	%
Luís Filipe Menezes	21,101	53.6
Luís Marques Mendes	16,973	43.1
Blank/Invalid ballots	1,279	3.3
Turnout	39,353	62.42
Source: Diretas 2007

=== Vila Nova de Gaia City Council election, 2009 ===
Ballot: 11 October 2009
Party	Candidate	Votes	%	Seats	+/−
PSD/CDS–PP	Luís Filipe Menezes	92,486	62.0	8	+1
PS	Joaquim Couto	37,790	25.3	3	±0
CDU	Ilda Figueiredo	9,398	6.3	0	–1
BE	João Semedo	4,828	3.2	0	±0
MPT	Nuno Aldeia	993	0.7	0	±0
Blank/Invalid ballots		3,733	2.5	–	–
Turnout		149,228	59.71	11	±0
Source: Autárquicas 2009

=== Porto City Council election, 2013 ===
Ballot: 29 September 2013
Party	Candidate	Votes	%	Seats	+/−
Ind.	Rui Moreira	45,411	39.3	6	+6
PS	Manuel Pizarro	26,237	22.7	3	–2
PSD/PPM/MPT	Luís Filipe Menezes	24,366	21.1	3	–2
CDU	Pedro Carvalho	8,539	7.4	1	±0
BE	José Soeiro	4,166	3.6	0	±0
Other parties		1,877	1.6	0	±0
Blank/Invalid ballots		5,102	4.4	–	–
Turnout		115,698	52.60	13	±0
Source: Autárquicas 2013

=== Vila Nova de Gaia City Council election, 2025 ===
Ballot: 12 October 2025
Party	Candidate	Votes	%	Seats	+/−
PSD/CDS-PP/IL	Luís Filipe Menezes	61,966	40.7	5	+3
PS	João Paulo Correia	54,526	35.9	5	–4
Chega	António Barbosa	16,686	11.0	1	+1
CDU	André Araújo	5,811	3.8	1	±0
BE/L	João Martins	4,815	3.1	0	±0
Other parties		3,019	2.0	0	±0
Blank/Invalid ballots		5,278	3.5	–	–
Turnout		115,698	52.60	13	±0
Source: Autárquicas 2025
