= Luís Marques Mendes =

Portuguese lawyer and politician (born 1957)

Luís Marques Mendes GCIH
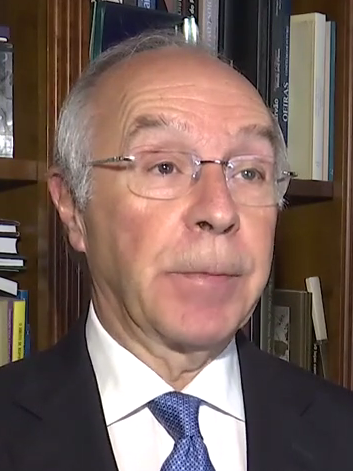
- Marques Mendes in 2025

President of the Social Democratic Party
- In office 8 April 2005 – 12 October 2007
- Secretary-General: Miguel Macedo
- Preceded by: Pedro Santana Lopes
- Succeeded by: Luís Filipe Menezes

Minister of Parliamentary Affairs
- In office 6 April 2002 – 17 July 2004
- Prime Minister: José Manuel Barroso
- Preceded by: António Costa
- Succeeded by: Rui Gomes da Silva

Minister in the Cabinet of the Prime Minister
- In office 19 March 1992 – 28 October 1995
- Prime Minister: Aníbal Cavaco Silva
- Preceded by: António Couto dos Santos
- Succeeded by: Jorge Coelho
Other offices
Member of the Council of State
In office 7 April 2016 – 9 March 2026
President	Marcelo Rebelo de Sousa
In office 20 June 2011 – 22 October 2015
President	Aníbal Cavaco Silva
In office 15 July 2005 – 17 October 2007
President	Jorge Sampaio; Aníbal Cavaco Silva
Secretary of State for the Presidency of the Council of Ministers
In office 17 August 1987 – 19 March 1992
Prime Minister	Aníbal Cavaco Silva
Preceded by	Pedro Santana Lopes
Succeeded by	Paulo Teixeira Pinto
Under Secretary of State to the Minister of Parliamentary Affairs
In office 8 November 1985 – 17 August 1987
Prime Minister	Aníbal Cavaco Silva
Preceded by	António Vitorino
Succeeded by	Carlos Encarnação
Member of the Assembly of the Republic
In office 31 October 1995 – 18 October 2007
Constituency	Braga (1995–1999); Aveiro (1999–2007)
Deputy Mayor of Fafe
In office 1977–1979
Mayor	António Guimarães

Personal details
- Born: Luís Manuel Gonçalves Marques Mendes; 5 September 1957 (age 68) Guimarães, Portugal
- Party: Social Democratic Party
- Height: 1.62 m (5 ft 4 in)
- Spouse: Rosa Pinto Salazar (m. 1982)
- Children: 3
- Parent(s): António Marques Mendes (father); Maria Isabel Gonçalves (mother)
- Relatives: Clara Marques Mendes (sister)
- Education: University of Coimbra
- Occupation: Lawyer • Politician • Political commentator
- Awards: Order of Prince Henry (2008)

Luís Manuel Gonçalves Marques Mendes GCIH (born 5 September 1957) is a Portuguese lawyer and politician. He was the President of the Social Democratic Party from 2005 until 2007. He ran and lost the 2026 presidential election, being defeated after obtaining 11.3% of the votes.

== Biography ==
Luís Marques Mendes is the son of António Marques Mendes and wife Maria Isabel Gonçalves. He studied Law in the Faculty of Law of the University of Coimbra.

A member of the Social Democratic Party (PSD) since its founding, when he was 16, Marques Mendes first began his political career in 1976, after being elected as Deputy Mayor of Fafe.

In 1985, he was invited by Aníbal Cavaco Silva to become the Secretary of State to the Minister of Parliamentary Affairs, being responsible with Mass Communication, being responsible for the creation of the Lusa News Agency In 1987, he became the Secretary of State to the Presidency of the Council of Ministers and, in 1992, he became Assistant Minister to the Prime Minister.

He became a member of the Assembly of the Republic in 1995, during Fernando Nogueira's leadership and, after Marcelo Rebelo de Sousa was elected as the leader of the PSD, Marques Mendes became the party's parliamentary leader.

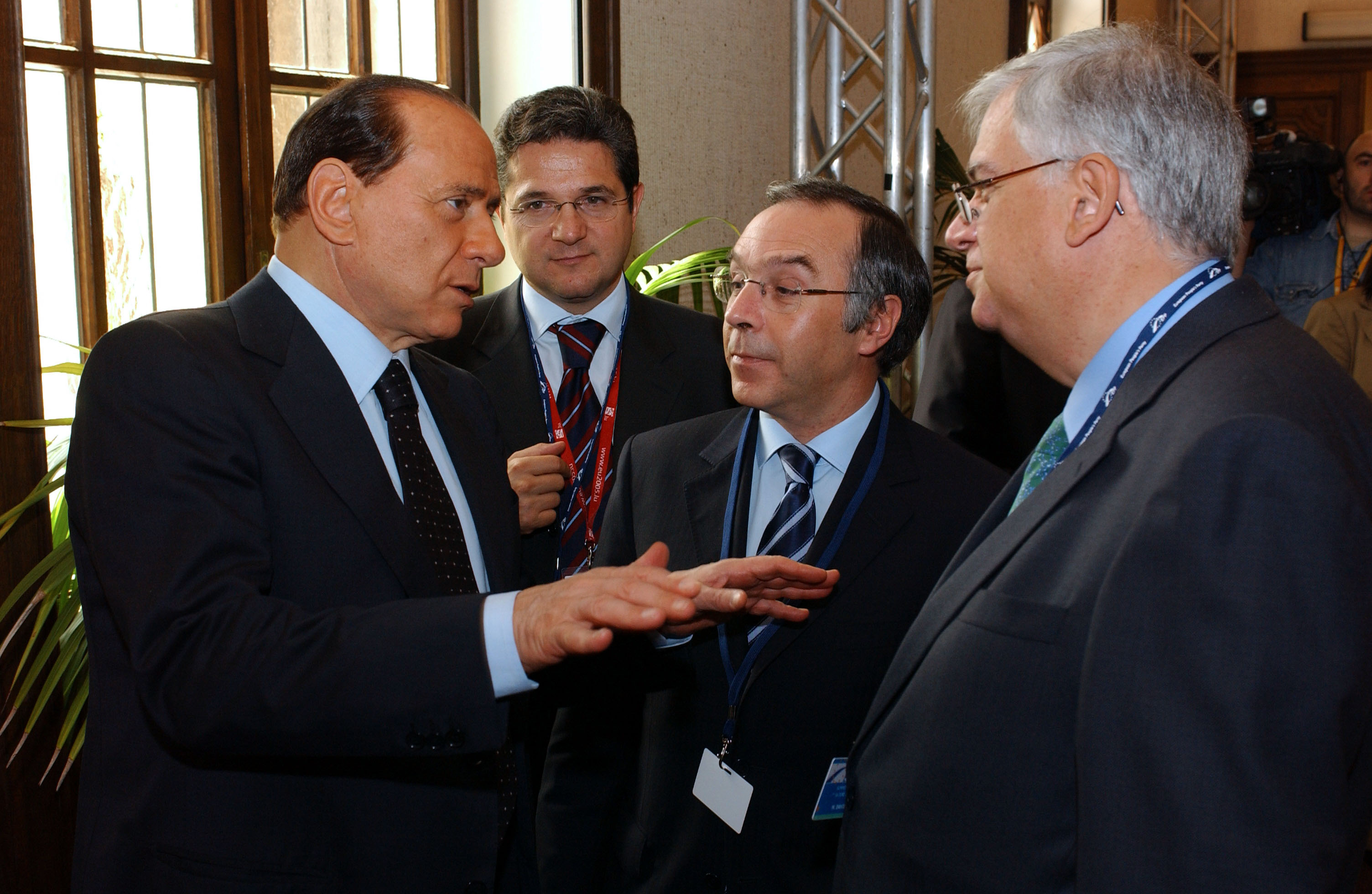
Luís Marques Mendes with Silvio Berlusconi in an EPP summit in 2005

He ran for the party's leadership for the first time in 2000, coming third place with 16% behind Pedro Santana Lopes and the incumbent leader José Manuel Durão Barroso.

In 2002, he was invited by Durão Barroso to be the Minister of Parliamentary Affairs from 2002 until 2004.

Following the PSD's defeat in the 2005 legislative election, Marques Mendes succeeded Santana Lopes as the President of the PSD, after defeating Vila Nova de Gaia Mayor Luís Filipe Menezes.

During his time in the leadership, he chose not to appoint any candidate in the 2005 local elections who was under investigation, among which were Isaltino Morais, who ran as an independent and won in Oeiras. After the 2007 Lisbon local by-election, when PSD finished in third place with 15.8%, Marques Mendes called for a snap leadership election, being defeated by Luís Filipe Menezes.

In 2011, he was elected by the Assembly of the Republic as a member of the Council of State, being later nominated by President Marcelo Rebelo de Sousa to the same council.

In 2013, he became a political commentator in SIC, later replacing Marcelo Rebelo de Sousa as the main commentator in the TV station.

=== 2026 presidential election ===
2026 Luís Marques Mendes presidential campaign
- Campaign: President of Portugal in the 2026 Portuguese presidential election
- Candidate: Luís Marques Mendes, former President of the Social Democratic Party (2005–2007)
- Affiliation: Social Democratic Party; CDS – People's Party
- Status: Announcement: 2 February 2025; Campaign launch: 6 February 2025; Formalized candidacy: 17 December 2025; Defeat: 18 January 2026
- Headquarters: Avenida da República, Lisbon
- Key people: Rui Moreira (campaign chair); Duarte Marques (campaign director)
- Slogan: O valor da experiência (The value of experience)

Website
- luismarquesmendes.pt

Marques Mendes was speculated as a potential presidential candidate since Marcelo Rebelo de Sousa won the 2016 election. On 6 February 2025, he announced his candidacy in the 2026 presidential election in Fafe.

He lost the 2026 election, coming in fifth place after winning just 11.3% of the votes, the worst result ever for a PSD backed candidate in history. He supported António José Seguro in the second round of the election.

== Family ==
He married in Guimarães, Vermil, on 24 April 1982, to Rosa Sofia Pinto Martins Salazar, born in Guimarães, Vermil, on 8 May 1957, a Licentiate in Modern Literatures and Languages (English and German), daughter of António Martins Fernandes Salazar (b. Guimarães, Vermil, Calçada, 19 May 1931), an Industrialist, one of the pioneers of the Ave, Subregion industrialization, and wife (m. Vila do Conde, São Miguel de Arcos, 21 April 1955) Berta da Silva Pinto (Penafiel, Penafiel, 23 May 1934 – Guimarães, Creixomil, 13 February 1995), and paternal granddaughter of José Fernandes Salazar (Guimarães, Vermil, 3 March 1890 – Porto, Miragaia, 1 December 1975), an Industrialist, one of the pioneers of the Ave, Subregion industrialization, and wife (m. Guimarães, Ronfe, 19 February 1925) Rosa Correia da Silva Martins (Guimarães, Ronfe, 2 January 1897 – Porto, Cedofeita, 31 August 1972). The couple has three children:

- João Pedro Pinto Salazar Marques Mendes
- Ana Sofia Pinto Salazar Marques Mendes
- João Miguel Pinto Salazar Marques Mendes

== Honours ==
- Grand-Cross of the Order of Prince Henry, Portugal (6 June 2008)

== Electoral history ==
=== PSD leadership election, 2000 ===
Ballot: 27 February 2000
Candidate	Votes	%
José Manuel Durão Barroso	469	50.3
Pedro Santana Lopes	313	33.6
Luís Marques Mendes	150	16.1
Turnout	932	
Source: Results

=== PSD leadership election, 2005 ===
Ballot: 9 April 2005
Candidate	Votes	%
Luís Marques Mendes	497	56.6
Luís Filipe Menezes	381	43.4
Turnout	878	
Source: PSD Congress

=== PSD leadership election, 2006 ===
Ballot: 5 May 2006
Candidate	Votes	%
Luís Marques Mendes	18,832	90.9
Blank/Invalid ballots	1,881	9.1
Turnout	20,713	37.33
Source: Diretas 2006

=== PSD leadership election, 2007 ===
Ballot: 28 September 2007
Candidate	Votes	%
Luís Filipe Menezes	21,101	53.6
Luís Marques Mendes	16,973	43.1
Blank/Invalid ballots	1,279	3.3
Turnout	39,353	62.42
Source: Diretas 2007

=== Presidential election, 2026 ===
Ballot: 18 January and 8 February 2026
Candidate	First round		Second round	
Candidate	Votes	%	Votes	%
António José Seguro	1,755,563	31.1	3,502,613	66.8
André Ventura	1,327,021	23.5	1,737,950	33.2
João Cotrim de Figueiredo	903,057	16.0		
Henrique Gouveia e Melo	695,377	12.3		
Luís Marques Mendes	637,442	11.3		
Catarina Martins	116,407	2.1		
António Filipe	92,644	1.6		
Manuel João Vieira	60,927	1.1		
Jorge Pinto	38,588	0.7		
André Pestana	10,897	0.2		
Humberto Correia	4,773	0.1		
Blank/Invalid ballots	125,840	–	275,414	–
Turnout	5,768,536	52.39	5,515,977	50.03
Source: Comissão Nacional de Eleições
