= Manuela Ferreira Leite =

Portuguese economist, pundit and retired politician (born 1940)

Her Excellency Manuela Ferreira Leite GCC GCIH
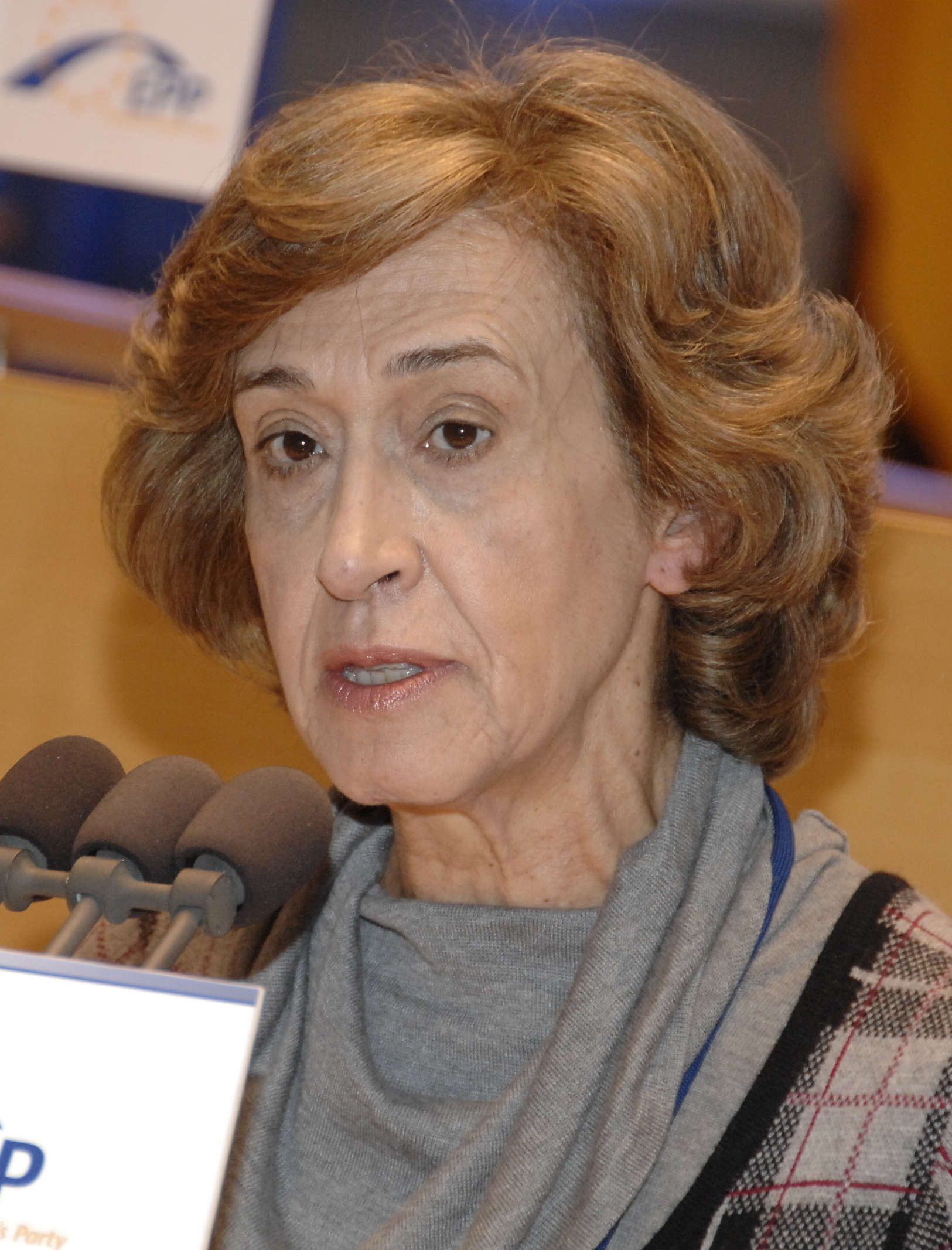
- Ferreira Leite in 2009

Chancellor of the National Orders
- In office 20 July 2011 – 20 July 2026
- President: Aníbal Cavaco Silva; Marcelo Rebelo de Sousa
- Preceded by: João Bosco Mota Amaral
- Succeeded by: José Nunes Liberato

President of the Social Democratic Party
- In office 20 June 2008 – 9 April 2010
- Secretary-General: Luís Marques Guedes
- Preceded by: Luís Filipe Menezes
- Succeeded by: Pedro Passos Coelho

Minister of Finance
- In office 6 April 2002 – 17 July 2004
- Prime Minister: José Manuel Barroso
- Preceded by: Guilherme d'Oliveira Martins
- Succeeded by: Bagão Félix

Minister of Education
- In office 7 December 1993 – 28 October 1995
- Prime Minister: Aníbal Cavaco Silva
- Preceded by: António Couto dos Santos
- Succeeded by: Eduardo Marçal Grilo

Secretary of State for the Budget
- In office 5 January 1990 – 7 December 1993
- Prime Minister: Aníbal Cavaco Silva
- Preceded by: Rui Carp
- Succeeded by: Norberto Rosa

Member of the Assembly of the Republic
- In office 15 October 2009 – 19 June 2011
- Constituency: Lisbon
- In office 1 October 1995 – 17 July 2004
- Constituency: Évora (1995–1999); Lisbon (1999–2004)

Personal details
- Born: Maria Manuela Dias Ferreira; 3 December 1940 (age 85) Lisbon, Portugal
- Party: Social Democratic Party
- Spouse: Rui Leite (div.)
- Children: 3
- Relatives: José Dias Ferreira (great-grandfather); Pedro Santana Lopes (cousin)
- Education: Lisbon School of Economics and Management
- Profession: Economist
- Awards: Order of Christ Order of Prince Henry

Maria Manuela Dias Ferreira Leite GCC GCIH (Portuguese pronunciation: [mɐnuˈɛlɐ fɨˈʁɐjɾɐ ˈlɐjtɨ]; born 3 December 1940) is a Portuguese economist, pundit and retired politician. Ferreira Leite served as Minister of Education in Aníbal Cavaco Silva's third government, from 1993 to 1995, and as Minister of State and Finance in José Durão Barroso's government, from 2002 to 2004.

She was leader of the Social Democratic Party between June 2008 and April 2010. Since 2011, she is the Chancellor of the National Orders of Portugal.

== Background ==
Manuela Ferreira Leite was born in Lisbon, Portugal, to a family with many generations of famous lawyers. Her brother José Dias Ferreira is a lawyer and a political commentator and sports commentator. She is a daughter of Carlos Eugénio Dias Ferreira (born 18 May 1908), a Licentiate in Law from the Faculty of Law of the University of Lisbon and a lawyer, and wife Julieta Teixeira de Carvalho, a Licentiate in Engineering from the Instituto Superior Técnico of the Technical University of Lisbon and an engineer. Her great-grandfather was Minister and Counselor José Dias Ferreira.

== Career ==
She is a Licentiate in Finances from the ISEG - Instituto Superior de Economia e Gestão (formerly known as ISCEF - Instituto Superior de Ciências Económicas e Financeiras), a noted economics and finance school of the University of Lisbon (Formerly Technical University of Lisbon).

Manuela Ferreira Leite has in the past held several positions within the Portuguese government, including Minister of Education during Aníbal Cavaco Silva's cabinet between 1993 and 1995, and 112th Minister of State and Finances during Durão Barroso's cabinets between 6 April 2002 and 2004. In both cases her politics of contention were targeted for its alleged excessiveness. In Education, as so many of her predecessors and successors but with worse opposition and manifestations, she had to deal with the issue of tuitions, which even though of low value remains hard to afford by many college students. In 2006, she was non-executive administrator of the Portuguese Banco Santander Totta.

She was also, between 2006 and 2008, member of the Council of State, designated by the President of Portugal.

She was elected leader of the Social Democratic Party (PSD) on 31 May 2008, leading the party during the 2009 legislative elections. She was unable to defeat the Socialist Party led by José Sócrates, although achieving a slight increase in number of votes and seats. As leader of the major party outside the government, she was the Leader of the Opposition. She was succeeded as party leader by Pedro Passos Coelho on 9 April 2010.

After leaving PSD leadership she retired from active party politics (although she is still a member of the party). She currently has a weekly programme where she comments about politics and current affairs at the cable news channel TVI 24.

== Personal life ==
She was married to Rui Leite, a Licentiate in Economics from the Instituto Superior de Ciências Económicas e Financeiras of the Technical University of Lisbon and an Economist, from whom she is now divorced and has three children:

- Nuno Dias Ferreira Leite, who married at the Church of Campo Grande in Campo Grande, Lisbon, on 6 July 2006 to Mónica da Cruz Rocha Campos and had two daughters:
  - Marta Bessa Campos Ferreira Leite
  - Catarina Bessa Campos Ferreira Leite
- João Dias Ferreira Leite
- Ana Dias Ferreira Leite, married at the Church of Santos in Santos-o-Velho, Lisbon, on 3 December 2005 to João Maria de Gouveia Durão de Quintanilha e Mendonça, born in Lisbon, Alvalade, on 3 November 1978, only son of three children of João Maria de Azevedo de Quintanilha e Mendonça (b. 17 May 1952) and wife Maria Joana Guizado de Gouveia Durão, and had issue:
  - Maria Ferreira Leite de Quintanilha e Mendonça (b. London, Middlesex, 24 April 2006)
  - João Maria Ferreira Leite de Quintanilha e Mendonça (b. London, Middlesex, 30 May 2008)
  - Vasco Ferreira Leite de Quintanilha e Mendonça (b. London, Middlesex, 17 September 2012)

== Honours ==
- Grand Cross of the Order of Prince Henry, Portugal (6 March 1998)
- Grand-Cross of the Order of Christ, Portugal (10 June 2011)

== Electoral history ==
=== PSD leadership election, 2008 ===
Ballot: 31 May 2008
Candidate	Votes	%
Manuela Ferreira Leite	17,278	37.9
Pedro Passos Coelho	14,160	31.1
Pedro Santana Lopes	13,495	29.6
Patinha Antão	308	0.7
Blank/Invalid ballots	351	0.8
Turnout	45,592	59.13
Source: Resultados

=== Legislative election, 2009 ===
Ballot: 27 September 2009
Party	Candidate	Votes	%	Seats	+/−
PS	José Sócrates	2,077,238	36.6	97	–24
PSD	Manuela Ferreira Leite	1,653,665	29.1	81	+6
CDS–PP	Paulo Portas	592,778	10.4	21	+9
BE	Francisco Louçã	557,306	9.8	16	+8
CDU	Jerónimo de Sousa	446,279	7.9	15	+1
Other parties		178,012	3.1	0	±0
Blank/Invalid ballots		175,980	3.1	–	–
Turnout		5,681,258	59.68	230	±0
Source: Comissão Nacional de Eleições

Party political offices
Preceded by Luís Filipe Menezes	President of the Social Democratic Party; 2008–2010	Succeeded by Pedro Passos Coelho
Political offices
Preceded by Rui Carp	Secretary of State for the Budget; 1990–1993	Succeeded by Norberto Rosa
Preceded by António Couto dos Santos	Minister of Education; 1993–1995	Succeeded by Eduardo Marçal Grilo
Preceded by Guilherme d'Oliveira Martins	Minister of Finance; 2002–2004	Succeeded by Bagão Félix
Honorary titles
Preceded by João Bosco Mota Amaral	Chancellor of the National Orders; 2011–present	Incumbent
