= Pedro Passos Coelho =

Prime Minister of Portugal from 2011 to 2015

His Excellency Pedro Passos Coelho
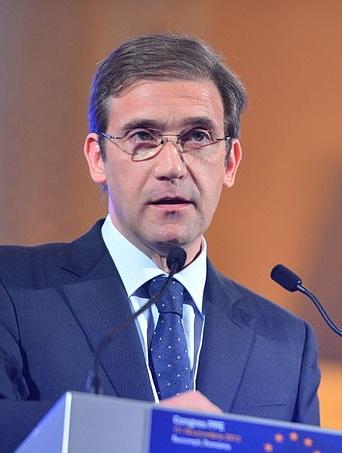
- Coelho in 2012

Prime Minister of Portugal
- In office 21 June 2011 – 26 November 2015
- President: Aníbal Cavaco Silva
- Deputy: Paulo Portas
- Preceded by: José Sócrates
- Succeeded by: António Costa

President of the Social Democratic Party
- In office 9 April 2010 – 16 February 2018
- Secretary-General: Luís Marques Guedes; Miguel Relvas; José Matos Rosa
- Preceded by: Manuela Ferreira Leite
- Succeeded by: Rui Rio

Leader of the Opposition
- In office 26 November 2015 – 16 February 2018
- Prime Minister: António Costa
- Preceded by: António Costa
- Succeeded by: Rui Rio
- In office 9 April 2010 – 21 June 2011
- Prime Minister: José Sócrates
- Preceded by: Manuela Ferreira Leite
- Succeeded by: José Sócrates

President of the Social Democratic Youth
- In office 11 March 1990 – 17 December 1995
- Preceded by: Carlos Coelho
- Succeeded by: Jorge Moreira da Silva

Member of the Assembly of the Republic
- In office 23 October 2015 – 28 February 2018
- Constituency: Lisbon
- In office 20 June 2011 – 22 October 2015
- Constituency: Vila Real
- In office 4 November 1991 – 24 October 1999
- Constituency: Lisbon

Personal details
- Born: Pedro Manuel Mamede Passos Coelho; 24 July 1964 (age 62) Coimbra, Portugal
- Party: Social Democratic Party
- Spouses: Fátima Padinha (m. 1985; div. 2003) Laura Ferreira (m. 2004; died 2020)
- Children: 3
- Education: Escola Secundária Camilo Castelo Branco
- Alma mater: Lusíada University of Lisbon
- Awards: Order of Merit of the Republic of Poland Order of the Sun of Peru Order of the Aztec Eagle of Mexico

Pedro Manuel Mamede Passos Coelho (European Portuguese pronunciation: [ˈpeðɾu mɐˈnwɛl mɐˈmɛðɨ ˈpasuʃ ˈkwɐʎu]; born 24 July 1964) is a Portuguese politician and university guest lecturer who was the 117th prime minister of Portugal, in office from 2011 to 2015. He was the leader of the Social Democratic Party (PSD) between 2010 and 2018.

Passos Coelho started very early in politics and was the national leader of the youth branch of PSD. He led the XIX Governo Constitucional (19th Constitutional Government of Portugal) and the XX Governo Constitucional (20th Constitutional Government of Portugal) as head of government from 21 June 2011 to 26 November 2015. His term in office oversaw the application of the European troika bailout to Portugal (requested by the previous prime minister, José Sócrates of the Socialist Party) and was marked by a wave of widespread austerity in both Portugal and abroad.

== Early years ==
Pedro Passos Coelho was born in the parish of Sé Nova in Coimbra, Portugal, on 24 July 1964. He is the youngest son of a medical doctor, António Passos Coelho (born in Vale de Nogueiras, Vila Real, 31 May 1926 – 4 February 2019) and Maria Rodrigues Santos Mamede (born in Santana da Serra, Ourique, c. 1930), a nurse whom António married in 1955. He has an older sister, Maria Teresa Mamede Passos Coelho, a medical doctor, and an older brother, Miguel Mamede Passos Coelho, who was born with cerebral palsy.

He spent his childhood in Angola — then an overseas territory of Portugal after it had been colonised by the Portuguese since the 16th century — where his father practised medicine. After the Carnation Revolution in 1974 and the independence of the territory as the People's Republic of Angola, he returned with his family to Europe and settled in Vila Real, in northern Portugal.

He started very early in politics, as a 14-year-old boy, and had a long and prominent career in the youth branch of the Social Democratic Party (PSD), the JSD, where he was a member of the National Council (1980–1982). As a young student, his academic interests, vocations and ambitions were directed towards a future career in medicine, to follow his father and older sister's steps, or instead mathematics. However, his largest ambition and vocation revolved around politics.

== Education ==
Passos Coelho moved to Africa at five years of age, and studied in basic schools of the cities of Silva Porto and later Luanda, in the former Portuguese territory of Angola, until the age of 10. His parents went to the Portuguese African territory of Angola to work there among the native rural populations who were plagued by tropical diseases such as tuberculosis. Firstly, Coelho studied in a nun-run Catholic school, then in the public school, and again in another Catholic school run by the Marist Brothers. Then, after the Carnation Revolution in 1974, and the dismantling of the Portuguese Overseas Empire in Africa, he returned to Europe, settling in his grandparents estate, in Vale de Nogueiras, near the city of Vila Real, Norte Region, Portugal. His father only rejoined the family in 1975, the year that Angola became an independent territory known as the People's Republic of Angola. To attend a secondary education institution in Vila Real, the Liceu Nacional Camilo Castelo-Branco (Camilo Castelo-Branco National High School), he moved to the city.

He worked for the youth branch of the PSD party, preparing motions and documents, and these time-consuming tasks impacted his final high school grades. As his desire had been to pursue Medicine – as had his father and his sister – he reduced his political activities for a year to focus on studying (a school year which he had to repeat), aiming to improve his grades in order to reach the high marks needed to enroll at a medical school in Lisbon; during this time, when he was 18 years old, he also started working as a math teacher in Vila Pouca de Aguiar. His final high school average mark was 16.8 (out of 20), which was 0.2 values short of what was necessary to be admitted into Medicine; therefore, he chose to study Mathematics at Faculdade de Ciências de Lisboa. He did not, however, finish his degree, having instead elected to work full-time in his party's youth branch – his new life in the capital city of Portugal having probably been a driving factor in this decision. In 1987, he was elected vice-president of JSD, and president in 1991. The following year, aged 24 years old, his first child was born to Fátima Padinha, a former member of the girl band Doce who he would later marry.

After dropping out of the University of Lisbon, he would enrol in 1999 in the Lusíada University, where he would obtain a degree in economics in 2001, when he was 37 years old. By then he had already been member of the parliament between 1991 and 1999, among other attributions (he worked in a public relations capacity during the late 1980s at Qimibro, a metals broker and trading firm founded by José Manuel Bento dos Santos and Eduardo Catroga, after invitation of a cousin who worked there).

== Political career ==
=== Early career ===
Starting very early in politics, he had a long career in the youth branch of the Social Democratic Party (PSD), the JSD, where he was a member of the National Council (1980–1982) and chairman of the Political Committee (1990–1995). He was a Lisbon deputy to the Assembly of the Republic in the VI and VII Legislatures (1991–1999); he also joined the Parliamentary Assembly of NATO (1991–1995) and was vice chairman of the Parliamentary Group of PSD (1996–1999). In 1997, he ran for mayor of Amadora without success, but was elected municipal councillor (1997–2001). After he had been a member of the parliament from 1991 to 1999, Passos Coelho became eligible by law to a life pension; however, he declined the offer.

He was awarded a degree in economics by Lusíada University (Lisbon) when he was 37 (2001). He became a consultant with Tecnoformas (2000–2004), collaborator of LDN Consultants (2001–2004), Director of the Training Department and coordinator of the Program of Seminars URBE – Núcleos Urbanos de Pesquisa e Intervenção (2003–2004). He joined the company Fomentinvest as a CFO (2004–2006) working with Ângelo Correia, chairman of Fomentinvest and also a noted member of PSD. Correia, an experienced member of PSD, is a close friend of Passos Coelho, both inside their party and corporate governance careers, and is considered Passos Coelho's political mentor. Passos Coelho became a member of the Executive (in 2007), accumulating the functions of chairman of the Board of the HLCTejo (2007–2009).

He was vice-president of PSD during the leadership of Luís Marques Mendes (2005–2006) and has also been president of the Municipal Assembly of Vila Real Municipality since 2005; he was a presidential candidate for PSD in May 2008, where he proposed for the first time a programmatic review of the party's orientation. Defeated by Manuela Ferreira Leite, he founded, with a group of his supporters, the think-tank Construir Ideias (Building Ideas). On 21 January 2010, his book Mudar ("To Change") was published, and he was again a candidate for the leadership of PSD for the direct elections in March 2010; he was elected president of PSD on 26 March 2010.

By 2010, in a context of sovereign default, he helped defeat the Socialist government under the leadership of José Sócrates when it tried to adopt a package of austerity measures to maintain economic stability, leading to the resignation of the prime minister on 23 March 2011, and the general election of 5 June 2011.

=== Prime minister of Portugal ===
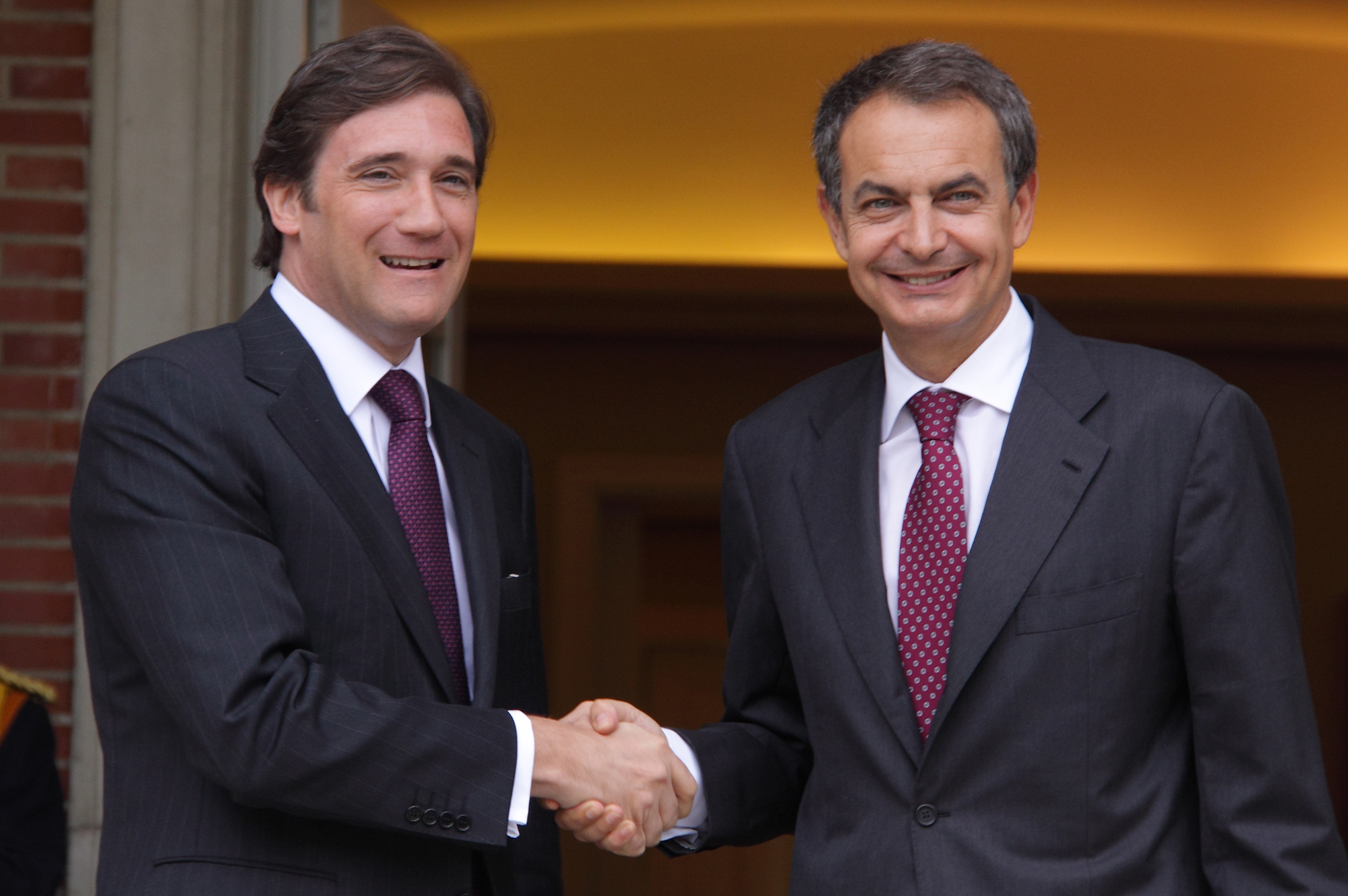
Passos Coelho with then Spanish Prime-Minister Rodriguez Zapatero, in October 2011

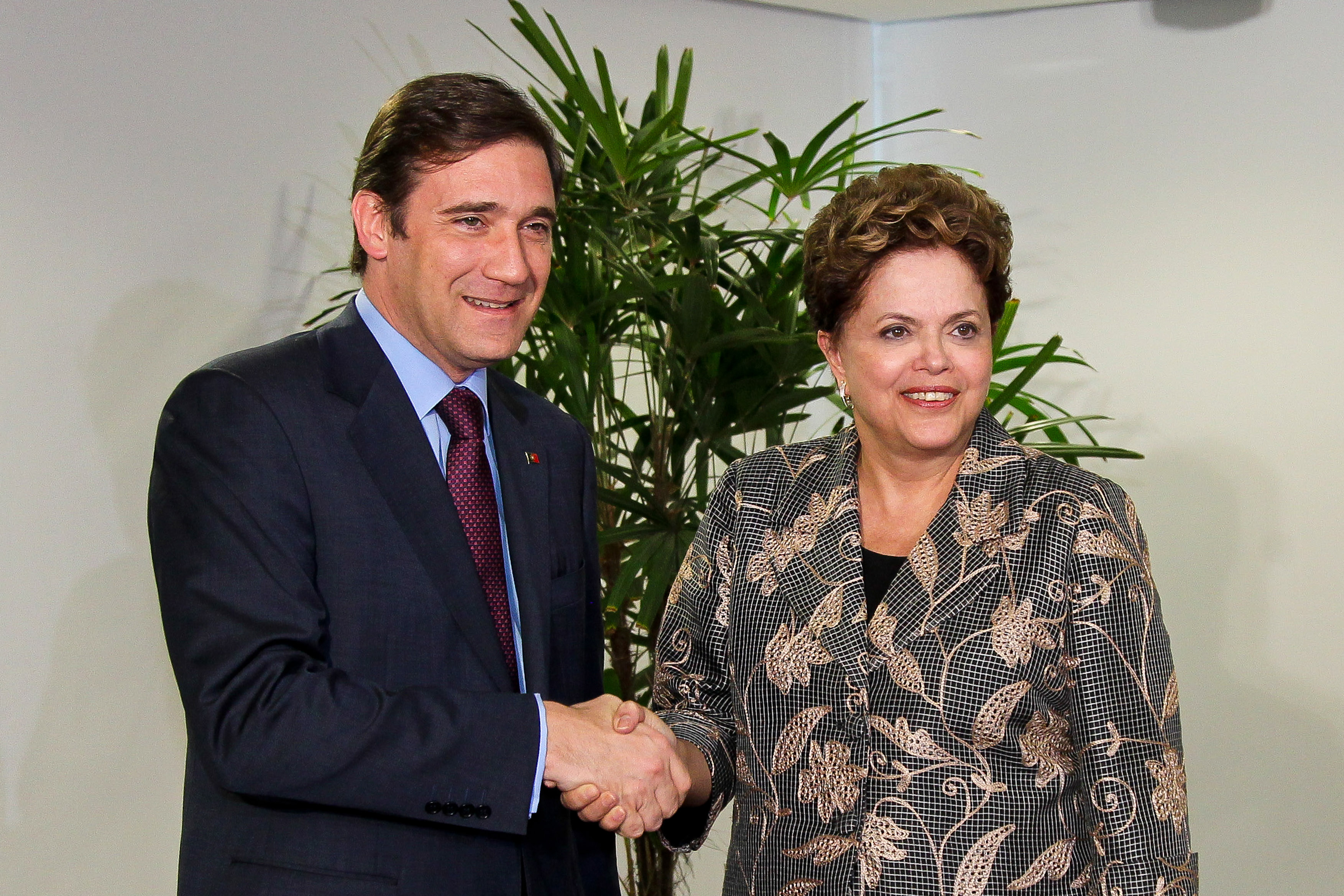
Passos Coelho with then-Brazilian President Dilma Rousseff, in October 2011

On 5 June 2011, following the 2011 Portuguese legislative election, Passos Coelho was elected Prime Minister of Portugal. He achieved a historical win for his political party PSD, defeating José Sócrates from the Socialist Party (PS). Through a coalition with CDS-PP, Passos Coelho and PSD were in a position to form a right-wing majority in the Portuguese Parliament. Immediately after the election, he started conversations with Christian Democratic president Paulo Portas to form the coalition.

==== Overview ====
Passos Coelho's political program was considered by the Portuguese left (Socialist Party (PS) and its communist political allies), which had governed the country during most of the time until the financial collapse of 2010, as strictly aligned with economic liberalism, and included a firm intention to accomplish the European Union/IMF-led rescue plan for Portugal's sovereign debt crisis. The rescue plan included widespread tax increases and reforms aimed at better efficiency and rationalised resource allocation in the public sector, to reduce the number of unnecessary civil servants and chronic public sector's overcapacity. It also included the privatization of at least one channel of the public radio and television RTP network, the Caixa Geral de Depósitos' insurance operations (including Fidelidade), and some parts of the National Service of Health.

His coalition partner Paulo Portas of CDS-PP, publicly expressed his disapproval of some of Passos Coelho's proposals. Passos Coelho entered office as a moderate social conservative, with a mixed record on abortion (he voted no in the 1998 referendum and yes in the following in 2007), while opposing euthanasia and same-sex marriage, supporting same-sex civil unions instead. It was not certain if he would try to overrule the previous José Sócrates-led Socialist government laws that allowed abortion until 10 weeks and same-sex marriage in Portugal. During his campaign, he admitted the re-evaluation of the current abortion law approved in 2007, after a referendum, that allowed it under any circumstance until 10 weeks of pregnancy. The law was deemed unconstitutional by 6 of the 13 judges of the Portuguese Constitutional Court.

Other creations of the previous cabinets led by former prime minister José Sócrates were criticised by Passos Coelho, including the state-sponsored Novas Oportunidades educational qualification program for unschooled adults, which was dubbed a fraud due to alleged low standards of intellectual rigour and academic integrity. Pedro Passos Coelho and his government cabinet launched the foundations of the Banco Português de Fomento group and established Portugal's state-owned venture capital and private equity investing arm Portugal Ventures.

==== XIX Constitutional Government ====
The legislative elections of 2011, held on 5 June, would give Passos Coelho the biggest share of seats in the Assembly of the Republic, with 108 out of 230 seats. In Portugal, tradition and most interpretations of the Constitution, as it is, state that he who leads the party with the most seats is invited, by the president of the republic, Aníbal Cavaco Silva, to form the XIX constitutional government, so Passos Coelho had guaranteed the prime minister's position for himself, and the government to his party. But without an absolute majority in parliament, he couldn't guarantee stability. He needed to negotiate a coalition with another party, the closest party to PSD, ideologically, at the time, and still today, was CDS-PP, and as luck would have it, CDS-PP had 24 seats; when put together, the two parties had 132 out of 230. But Passos Coelho would only form a government when he had the coalition signed, and so negotiations began in earnest. It only took 10 days, from being invited to form a government on 6 June to having a deal signed with CDS-PP on June 16, and another 5 days for all the ministers and the prime minister to be sworn in, on June 21.

Passos Coelho's first government can be divided into two phases: 2011-2013; 2013-2015. From 2011 to 2013, he had a cabinet, almost completely different from the one he had from 2013 to 2015.

1st Cabinet Membership

Ministry	Incumbent	Party affiliation	Term
State	Paulo Portas	CDS-PP	21 June 2011 - 24 July 2013
State	Vítor Gaspar	PSD	21 June 2011 - 1 July 2013
Foreign Affairs	Paulo Portas	CDS-PP	21 June 2011 - 24 July 2013
Finances	Vítor Gaspar	PSD	21 June 2011 - 1 July 2013
National Defence	José Pedro Aguiar Branco	PSD	21 June 2011 - 30 October 2015
Internal Administration	Miguel Macedo	PSD	21 June 2011 - 19 November 2014
Justice	Paula Teixeira da Cruz	PSD	21 June 2011 - 30 October 2015
Minister in the Cabinet	Miguel Relvas	PSD	21 June 2011 - 13 April 2013
Parliament Affairs	Miguel Relvas	PSD	21 June 2011 - 13 April 2013
Presidency of the Council of Ministers	Luís Marques Guedes	PSD	21 June 2011 - 30 October 2015
Economy	Álvaro Santos Pereira	Independent	21 June 2011 - 24 July 2013
Labour	Álvaro Santos Pereira	Independent	21 June 2011 - 24 July 2013
Agriculture	Assunção Cristas	CDS-PP	21 June 2011 - 24 July 2013
Sea	Assunção Cristas	CDS-PP	21 June 2011 - 24 July 2013
Environment	Assunção Cristas	CDS-PP	21 June 2011 - 24 July 2013
Territorial Planning	Assunção Cristas	CDS-PP	21 June 2011 - 24 July 2013
Health	Paulo Macedo	Independent	21 June 2011 - 30 October 2015
Education	Nuno Crato	Independent	21 June 2011 - 30 October 2015
Science	Nuno Crato	Independent	21 June 2011 - 30 October 2015
Solidarity	Pedro Mota Soares	CDS-PP	21 June 2011 - 24 July 2013
Social Security	Pedro Mota Soares	CDS-PP	21 June 2011 - 24 July 2013

2nd Cabinet Membership

Ministry	Incumbent	Party affiliation	Term
Deputy Prime Minister	Paulo Portas	CDS-PP	24 July 2013 - 30 October 2015
State	Rui Machete	PSD	24 July 2013 - 30 October 2015
State	Maria Luís Albuquerque	PSD	2 July 2013 - 30 October 2015
Foreign Affairs	Rui Machete	PSD	24 July 2013 - 30 October 2015
Finances	Maria Luís Albuquerque	PSD	2 July 2013 - 30 October 2015
National Defence	José Pedro Aguiar Branco	PSD	21 June 21, 2011 - 30 October 2015
Internal Administration	Miguel Macedo	PSD	21 June 2011 - 19 November 2014
Internal Administration	Anabela Rodrigues	Independent	19 November 2014 - 30 October 2015
Justice	Paula Teixeira da Cruz	PSD	21 June 2011 - 30 October 2015
Minister in the Cabinet	Miguel Poiares Maduro	PSD	13 April 2013 - 30 October 2015
Regional Development	Miguel Poiares Maduro	PSD	13 April 2013 - 30 October 2015
Parliament Affairs	Luís Marques Guedes	PSD	13 April 2013 - 30 October 2015
Presidency of the Council of Ministers	Luís Marques Guedes	PSD	13 April 2013 - 30 October 2015
Economy	António Pires de Lima	CDS-PP	24 July 2013 - 30 October 2015
Agriculture	Assunção Cristas	CDS-PP	21 June 2011 - 30 October 2015
Sea	Assunção Cristas	CDS-PP	21 June 2011 - 30 October 2015
Environment	Jorge Moreira da Silva	PSD	24 July 2013 - 30 October 2015
Territorial Planning	Jorge Moreira da Silva	PSD	24 July 2013 - 30 October 2015
Energy	Jorge Moreira da Silva	PSD	24 July 2013 - 30 October 2015
Health	Paulo Macedo	Independent	21 June 2011 - 30 October 2015
Education	Nuno Crato	Independent	21 June 2011 - 30 October 2015
Science	Nuno Crato	Independent	21 June 2011 - 30 October 2015
Solidarity	Pedro Mota Soares	CDS-PP	21 June 2011 - 30 October 2015
Social Security	Pedro Mota Soares	CDS-PP	21 June 2011 - 30 October 2015
Labour	Pedro Mota Soares	CDS-PP	24 July 2013 - 30 October 2015

XX Constitutional Government

The legislative elections of 2015 were held on 4 October; the two government parties (PSD and CDS-PP) ran together under the name "Portugal à Frente" (PàF) or "Portugal Ahead". The Coalition, as it was called in the media, won the elections, without an absolute majority of seats in the Assembly of the Republic, with 107 out of 230. As mentioned before, tradition and most interpretations of the Constitution state that he who leads the party with the most seats is invited by the president of the republic to form a government, and so it was. On 22 October, Passos Coelho was appointed Prime Minister by President Aníbal Cavaco Silva.

The remaining parties in parliament were the Socialists (PS), with 86 seats, the Leftists (BE) with 19 seats, the Communists, with 16 seats, the Greens, with a single seat (elected in coalition CDU with the Communists) and the environmentalists (PAN) with a single seat as well.

After the election, Socialist Party leader António Costa entered negotiations with the other two major left-wing parties to form a confidence and supply agreement, and on 4 October the involved parties agreed to vote in favour of a no-confidence vote proposed by the Socialists, held on 10 November. By then, all the negotiations were completed, and Passos Coelho's Government's fate had been sealed.

António Costa's deal with the far-Left became known as the "Geringonça" meaning "contraption" - in this case, also meaning an improvised construction job, as from 2015 to 2019, the parties included in the ruling government coalition did not have a majority by themselves, and indeed had to rely on the confidence and supply agreement to remain in power.

The XX Constitutional government took office on 30 October 2015, leaving office 27 days later, on 26 November 2015.

Membership

Ministry	Incumbent	Party affiliation	Term
Deputy Prime Minister	Paulo Portas	CDS-PP	30 October 2015 - 26 November 2015
State	Rui Machete	PSD	30 October 2015 - 26 November 2015
State	Maria Luís Albuquerque	PSD	30 October 2015 - 26 November 2015
Finances	Maria Luís Albuquerque	PSD	30 October 2015 - 26 November 2015
Foreign Affairs	Rui Machete	PSD	30 October 2015 - 26 November 2015
National Defence	José Pedro Aguiar Branco	PSD	30 October 2015 - 26 November 2015
Internal Administration	João Calvão da Silva	PSD	30 October 2015 - 26 November 2015
Justice	Fernando Negrão	PSD	30 October 2015 - 26 November 2015
Parliament Affairs	Carlos Costa Neves	PSD	30 October 2015 - 26 November 2015
Presidency of the Council of Ministers	Luís Marques Guedes	PSD	30 October 2015 - 26 November 2015
Regional Development	Luís Marques Guedes	PSD	30 October 2015 - 26 November 2015
Economy	Miguel Morais Leitão	CDS-PP	30 October 2015 - 26 November 2015
Agriculture	Assunção Cristas	CDS-PP	30 October 2015 - 26 November 2015
Sea	Assunção Cristas	CDS-PP	30 October 2015 - 26 November 2015
Environment	Jorge Moreira da Silva	PSD	30 October 2015 - 26 November 2015
Territorial Planning	Jorge Moreira da Silva	PSD	30 October 2015 - 26 November 2015
Energy	Jorge Moreira da Silva	PSD	30 October 2015 - 26 November 2015
Health	Fernado Leal da Costa	Independent	30 October 2015 - 26 November 2015
Education	Margarida Mano	Independent	30 October 2015 - 26 November 2015
Science	Margarida Mano	Independent	30 October 2015 - 26 November 2015
Solidarity	Pedro Mota Soares	CDS-PP	30 October 2015 - 26 November 2015
Labour	Pedro Mota Soares	CDS-PP	30 October 2015 - 26 November 2015
Social Security	Pedro Mota Soares	CDS-PP	30 October 2015 - 26 November 2015
Administrative Modernisation	Rui Medeiros	Independent	30 October 2015 - 26 November 2015
Culture	Teresa Morais	PSD	30 October 2015 - 26 November 2015
Equality	Teresa Morais	PSD	30 October 2015 - 26 November 2015
Citizenship	Teresa Morais	PSD	30 October 2015 - 26 November 2015

Following a poor performance in the October 2017 local elections, Passos Coelho announced his resignation from the party leadership, calling early elections for January 2018, where Rui Rio, former mayor of Porto, was elected to the leadership.

==== Major policies ====
To accomplish the European Union/IMF-led rescue plan for Portugal's sovereign debt crisis, in July and August 2011, his government announced it was going to cut on state spending and increase austerity measures, including additional tax increases, but it will also have a social emergency package to help the poorest citizens. As time went on, it became increasingly clear that a series of supplementary measures would be taken during the course of the year as a means to restrain an out-of-control budget deficit. These included sharp cuts in spending on state-run healthcare, education and social security systems. His cabinet enforced reforms of the local administration to save money by avoiding unnecessary resource allocation and redundancy. This included extinguishing the 18 Civil Governments (Governo Civil) located across the country and a large number of parishes. According to the Instituto Nacional de Estatística, there were 4,261 parishes in Portugal in 2006. The reform implemented according to Law 11-A/2013 of 28 January 2013, which defined the reorganisation of the civil parishes, reduced the number of parishes to 3,091. Nevertheless, due to Portugal's legal constraints avoiding planned job cuts like those made across several developed countries at the time to fight overspending and overstaffing at municipality level, the 2013 mergers eventually increased the spending with the parishes.

- Public servants: the government wanted to sharply reduce the number of public servants and to achieve this, it created a special mechanism to cut jobs by mutual agreement. Due to the unsustainable and growing expenses with public servant salaries and privileges, the ruling party PSD said it would only hire one worker for each five that leave, a rule which revealed the extremely large number of unnecessary, redundant public servants that had been signed in across the decades. Hiring procedures for the public service were changed to guarantee an independent process, and public servants' wages were taken into account to limit extra payments. On 18 October 2011, the Portuguese minister of finance, Vítor Gaspar, said to the Portuguese television RTP 1 that the wage cuts imposed on public servants the previous week in the presentation of the State Budget for 2012 were the only way to avoid a much more painful and complex policy of public servant mass firing. He said that if wage cuts were not enforced, it would be necessary to get rid of about 100,000 public servants immediately (under the terms of the law, Portuguese public servants were shielded from unemployment, so a number of special derogations would be needed to achieve this). In November 2015, the Socialist Party announced it would terminate with Passos Coelho-era reassignment program for public sector employees which included planned job cuts, called Mobilidade Especial, later Requalificação.
- Public administration: since the beginning, the government promised to disclose within 90 days the list of public entities which were to be eliminated, reintegrated into other public institutions or privatised due to their uselessness. These included dozens of financially strapped public institutions, foundations and public companies at a local, regional and national level, which were considered ineffective and futile and prone to overspending and overstaffing.
- Taxes: tax rise. Higher indirect taxes, like VAT (IVA), for almost all goods and services.
- Labour: Labour laws were also altered, but most of the changes could not affect current workers due to the leftist, labor movement-inspired Portuguese Constitution of 1976 and its court (the Tribunal Constitucional), only those starting a new job from there on, while some public holidays were moved from mid-week to Mondays or Fridays to avoid typical extra-long bank holiday weekends. Faced with growing unemployment and hoping to avoid greater public unrest, the government cut the time needed to qualify for unemployment benefits from 15 to 12 months, but reduced the benefit period from 30 to 18 months and created new rules which reduced the monthly unemployment benefit granted to each unemployed citizen.
- Privatisations: release of state ownership on the utility Energias de Portugal (EDP), the grid management company REN – Redes Energéticas Nacionais, the financial institution Banco Português de Negócios and the flag carrier TAP Air Portugal by the end of 2011. The insurance company of the public bank Caixa Geral de Depósitos (CGD) was also for sale. Revenue from the sale of other parts of CGD was to be used to beef up the bank's capital ratios and its ability to lend to companies. Besides this, the government kept the promise to withdraw its special rights (golden shares) in companies such as Portugal Telecom.
- Finance: The creation of a development bank was defined as a priority by Prime Minister Pedro Passos Coelho in the parliamentary debate that began the activities of the remodeled XIX Constitutional Government of Portugal's cabinet on July 24, 2013, an installation commission was soon created that allowed the Council of Ministers, in October 2014, to formalize the creation of the Financial Development Institution (IFD - Instituição Financeira de Desenvolvimento) which was the percursor of the Banco Português de Fomento. Portugal Ventures, a state-run venture capital and private equity organisation which would later become part of the Banco Português de Fomento group, was also founded in 2012 by Passos Coelho's cabinet.
- Transports: the Lisbon-Madrid high-speed rail line was put on hold. The decision was taken bearing in mind the cost-cutting measures and the contracts that had already been signed. Transport providers like the Lisbon (Carris) and Porto bus companies and subway systems were also assessed to see if and when they could be sold off. The government programme also added that the road and rail transport companies, like Comboios de Portugal, "urgently need" to solve their chronic operating deficits and growing debts. On 8 December 2011, tolls were introduced on four shadow toll highways and in 2012, more than 300 km of railways were closed (to all traffic or to passenger only).
- Regulators: the regulatory bodies were turned into independent authorities with their officials being chosen through a process which comprises the government, the parliament and the presidency.
- Media: the media company owned by public broadcasting corporation RTP was to be restructured as early as 2012 to halt costs, and the privatisation of one of the two TV channels it owns (RTP1 and RTP2) was also on the table. Lusa news agency was also to be reorganised, following the state's goal of rethinking its position in regard to the national media.
- Monitoring measures: the government created a special unit to monitor the measures agreed with the so-called international troika composed by the International Monetary Fund, European Commission and European Central Bank. This special unit was subordinated to Carlos Moedas, the deputy secretary of state of Prime Minister Passos Coelho.
- Health: Public hospitals were turned over to private management "whenever this is more efficient, maintaining the essentially free health care services". The fees and taxes a citizen had to pay to use the national health service were substantially increased.
- Foreign affairs: Passos Coelho's cabinet enforced international relations policies directed towards increased economic relations with Portuguese-speaking countries like Angola and Brazil, as well as openly supporting the creation of an economic and fiscal government for the European Union. The government also supported a State-backed emigration policy to help unemployed and underemployed citizens who wish to flee rampant poverty and social regression, to find a job in foreign countries. On the other hand, the government created programs that issued residence permits to wealthy foreign investors, entrepreneurs and skilled workers in high demand.
- Social integration: In 2013, the XIX Constitutional Government of Portugal, led then by Prime Minister Pedro Passos Coelho, passed the National Strategy for the Integration of the Romani Communities, creating a Consultative Group for the Integration of the Portuguese Gypsy Communities.

The Portuguese Constitutional Court, with the praise of most unions and opposition party leaders, eventually rejected the equivalent to 20% of the government's austerity policies proposed by Passos Coelho and his cabinet. Most of the rejected proposals were related with labor market flexibility, public pensions' sustainability, civil servants' privileges and job cuts in the civil service.

=== Criticism ===
During his first year in cabinet, it became clear that the deep economic and financial crisis of Portugal would prompt several policy changes and increasing dissent over the cabinet's judgement. After an inaugural speech in which he promised, in the long run, to stabilise the economy, promote financial growth, employment, and protect those who needed the most, he moved on to adopt deep austerity measures that, in the view of his detractors, within the first year of government, led to the exact opposite. High-paying jobs and pensions were slashed while the lower ones were less affected. In addition, his government had earlier adopted a promoting stance on emigration, often advising the growing number of young unemployed people to leave the country. On 15 September 2012, Passos Coelho and his coalition government faced one of the biggest civil protests in the history of Portuguese democracy, where demands were made for solutions to be put in place. On 21 September 2012, while the prime minister and members of the cabinet were meeting with President Aníbal Cavaco Silva, a large number of citizens protested in front of the presidential house, the Belém Palace, some throwing bottles at security forces.

== Honours ==
- Grand-Cross of the Order of Merit, Poland (6 June 2012)
- Grand-Cross with diamonds of the Order of the Sun, Peru (6 June 2012)
- Sash of Special Category of the Order of the Aztec Eagle, Mexico (28 October 2014)

== Electoral history ==
=== Amadora City Council election, 1997 ===
Ballot: 14 December 1997
Party	Candidate	Votes	%	Seats	+/−
PS	Joaquim Raposo	28,127	33.9	4	±0
CDU	Orlando de Almeida	24,065	29.0	4	±0
PSD	Pedro Passos Coelho	22,223	26.8	3	±0
CDS–PP	–	2,864	3.5	0	±0
UDP	–	1,094	1.3	0	±0
PCTP/MRPP	–	972	1.2	0	±0
PSR	–	604	0.7	0	±0
Blank/Invalid ballots		3,082	3.7	–	–
Turnout		83,031	51.37	11	±0
Source: Autárquicas 1997

=== PSD leadership election, 2008 ===
Ballot: 31 May 2008
Candidate	Votes	%
Manuela Ferreira Leite	17,278	37.9
Pedro Passos Coelho	14,160	31.1
Pedro Santana Lopes	13,495	29.6
Patinha Antão	308	0.7
Blank/Invalid ballots	351	0.8
Turnout	45,592	59.13
Source: Resultados

=== PSD leadership election, 2010 ===
Ballot: 26 March 2010
Candidate	Votes	%
Pedro Passos Coelho	31,671	61.2
Paulo Rangel	17,821	34.4
José Pedro Aguiar Branco	1,769	3.4
Castanheira Barros	138	0.3
Blank/Invalid ballots	349	0.7
Turnout	51,748	66.26
Source: Resultados

=== Legislative election, 2011 ===
Ballot: 5 June 2011
Party	Candidate	Votes	%	Seats	+/−
PSD	Pedro Passos Coelho	2,159,181	38.7	108	+27
PS	José Sócrates	1,566,347	28.0	74	–23
CDS–PP	Paulo Portas	653,888	11.7	24	+3
CDU	Jerónimo de Sousa	441,147	7.9	16	+1
BE	Francisco Louçã	288,923	5.2	8	–8
PCTP/MRPP	Garcia Pereira	62,610	1.1	0	±0
PAN	Paulo Borges	57,995	1.0	0	new
Other parties		126,521	2.3	0	±0
Blank/Invalid ballots		228,017	4.1	–	–
Turnout		5,585,054	58.03	230	±0
Source: Comissão Nacional de Eleições

=== Legislative election, 2015 ===
Ballot: 4 October 2015
Party	Candidate	Votes	%	Seats	+/−
PàF	Pedro Passos Coelho	2,085,465	38.6	107	–25
PS	António Costa	1,747,730	32.3	86	+12
BE	Catarina Martins	550,945	10.2	19	+11
CDU	Jerónimo de Sousa	445,901	8.3	17	+1
PAN	André Silva	75,170	1.4	1	+1
PDR	Marinho e Pinto	61,920	1.1	0	new
PCTP/MRPP	Garcia Pereira	60,045	1.1	0	±0
Other parties		178,937	3.3	0	±0
Blank/Invalid ballots		201,979	3.7	–	–
Turnout		5,408,092	55.84	230	±0
Source: Diário da República

== Personal life ==
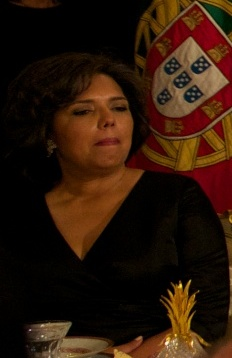
Laura Ferreira was the second spouse of Pedro Passos Coelho until her death.

Passos Coelho lives in Massamá, Greater Lisbon. He was married to Fátima Padinha, a former singer in the girl band Doce, with whom he has two daughters, Joana Padinha Passos Coelho (born 1988) and Catarina Padinha Passos Coelho (born 1993). His second marriage was to Laura Ferreira, a physiotherapy technician, born in Bissau, Portuguese Guinea (now Guinea-Bissau, West Africa), with whom he has one daughter, Júlia Ferreira Passos Coelho (born 2007). Laura Ferreira had been fighting cancer and died on 25 February 2020.

Apart from his native Portuguese, he can also speak some French and English. After his tenure as Prime Minister of Portugal, he became a teacher at both the Instituto Superior de Ciências Sociais e Políticas (University of Lisbon) and the Lusíada University.

Pedro Passos Coelho studied opera singing, is a baritone and even signed up for a Filipe La Féria casting.

== See also ==
- Liberalism in Portugal

Party political offices
Preceded by Carlos Coelho	President of the Social Democratic Youth; 1990–1995	Succeeded by Jorge Moreira da Silva
Preceded by Manuela Ferreira Leite	President of the Social Democratic Party; 2010–2018	Succeeded by Rui Rio
Political offices
Preceded by Manuela Ferreira Leite	Leader of the Opposition; 2010–2011	Succeeded by António José Seguro
Preceded by José Sócrates	Prime Minister of Portugal; 2011–2015	Succeeded by António Costa
Preceded by António Costa	Leader of the Opposition; 2015–2018	Succeeded by Rui Rio
