= Council of State (Portugal) =

Advisory council to the head of state

The Council of State (Portuguese: Conselho de Estado, IPA: [kõˈsɐʎu ðɨ ɨʃˈtaðu]) is a body established by the Portuguese Constitution to advise the President in the exercise of many of their discretionary powers.

== History ==
Although there are notices about the existence of a Council of State in Portugal before 1385, the first permanent regiment for its functioning was established by King Sebastian through his charter of 8 September 1569.

The Council of State continued to exist after the establishment of the Constitutional Monarchy in 1821. It was foreseen in the Portuguese Constitutions of 1822, 1826 and 1838.

After the 5 October 1910 revolution that established the Republic in Portugal, the Council of State was abolished, not being foreseen in the Constitution of 1911.

The Council of State was reestablished by the Constitution of 1933. It was again not foreseen by the Constitution of 1976. However, it was reestablished following the revision of the Constitution of 1982.

== Role ==
Besides summoning and advising the President whenever asked to do so by him/her, according to the Constitution the Council must be summoned by the President before:

- dissolving the Assembly of the Republic and the Legislative Assemblies of the autonomous regions;
- declaring war and making peace, and
- removing the Government.

It must also be summoned by the acting President before:

- setting the date for any election;
- calling an extraordinary sitting of the Parliament;
- appointing the Prime Minister;
- appointing and discharging, upon a proposal from the Govt., the President of the Court of Auditors, the Attorney General and the Chief of the General Staff of the Armed Forces (CGSAF);
- appointing and discharging, upon a proposal from the Govt. and after consulting the CGSAF, an eventual Deputy Chief of the General Staff of the Armed Forces and the Chiefs of Staff of the three armed services;
- exercising the functions of Commander-in-Chief of the Armed Forces;
- appointing ambassadors and extraordinary envoys (upon a proposal from the Govt.), and
- accrediting foreign diplomatic representatives.

== Counsellor of State ==
=== Membership ===
According to article 142 of the Constitution, the Council is composed of the following members, known as Councillors of State:

- Ex officio members, who remain in office for as long as they hold office:
  - President of the Portuguese Republic (chair the Council)
  - President of the Assembly of the Republic
  - Prime Minister
  - President of the Constitutional Court
  - Ombudsman
  - President of the Azores Regional Government
  - President of the Madeira Regional Government
  - Former elected Presidents of the Republic
- Five members designated by the President of the Republic, whose office ends with the term of office of the President of the Republic that appointed them. The term of the President is 5 years.
- Five members elected by the Assembly of the Republic, whose membership expires at the end of the legislature. The term of the legislature is 4 years, unless an early election is called.

=== Taking Office and Term Limits ===
The members of the Council of State are sworn in by the President of the Republic.

Members of the Council of State designated by the President and the Assembly of the Republic remain in office until the members who replace them in their respective positions take office.

=== Immunity ===
Councillors of State enjoy immunity as a sign of the highest honour of the office they hold. Thus, a Councillor of State may only be brought before a court with the prior authorisation of the Council, which waives his immunity. Unlike the immunity of the Members of the Assembly of the Republic, which must be waived when the crime in question is punishable by a sentence of more than 3 years imprisonment, the decision of the Council of State regarding the waiver of immunity of one of its members is free. In case of refusal the suspected member only answers in Court when he ceases to be a Councillor of State.

=== Current Councillors of State ===
Office	Member	Affiliation
President of the Republic and chair of the Council	António José Seguro since 9 March 2026	PS
President of the Assembly of the Republic	José Pedro Aguiar-Branco since 27 March 2024	PSD
Prime Minister	Luís Montenegro since 2 April 2024	PSD
President of the Constitutional Court	João Carlos Loureiro since 24 June 2026	PSD
Ombudsman	Luísa Neto since 3 July 2026	Ind.
President of the Regional Government of Madeira	Miguel Albuquerque since 20 April 2015	PSD
President of the Regional Government of Azores	José Manuel Bolieiro since 24 November 2020	PSD
Former elected Presidents of the Republic	António Ramalho Eanes since 9 March 1986	Ind.
Former elected Presidents of the Republic	Aníbal Cavaco Silva since 9 March 2016	PSD
Former elected Presidents of the Republic	Marcelo Rebelo de Sousa since 9 March 2026	PSD
Designated by the President of the Republic	Alberto Martins since 17 April 2026	PS
Designated by the President of the Republic	Isabel Capeloa Gil since 17 April 2026	Ind.
Designated by the President of the Republic	Maria do Carmo Fonseca since 17 April 2026	Ind.
Designated by the President of the Republic	Miguel Bastos Araújo since 17 April 2026	Ind.
Designated by the President of the Republic	Nuno Severiano Teixeira since 17 April 2026	PS
Elected by the Assembly of the Republic	Leonor Beleza since 17 April 2026	PSD
Elected by the Assembly of the Republic	André Ventura since 15 July 2024	CH
Elected by the Assembly of the Republic	Carlos César since 12 January 2016	PS
Elected by the Assembly of the Republic	Carlos Moedas since 15 July 2024	PSD
Elected by the Assembly of the Republic	Pedro Duarte since 17 April 2026	PSD

=== Former Councillors of State ===
Office	Member	Affiliation
Former elected President	Mário Soares (1996–2017)	PS
Former elected President	Jorge Sampaio (2006–2021)	PS
Inherent as President of the Assembly of the Republic	Leonardo Ribeiro de Almeida (1982–1983)	PSD
Inherent as President of the Assembly of the Republic	Manuel Tito de Morais (1983–1984)	PS
Inherent as President of the Assembly of the Republic	Fernando Amaral (1984–1987)	PSD
Inherent as President of the Assembly of the Republic	Vítor Crespo (1987–1991)	PSD
Inherent as President of the Assembly of the Republic	António Barbosa de Melo (1991–1995)	PSD
Inherent as President of the Assembly of the Republic	António de Almeida Santos (1995–2002)	PS
Inherent as President of the Assembly of the Republic	João Bosco Mota Amaral (2002–2005)	PSD
Inherent as President of the Assembly of the Republic	Jaime Gama (2005–2011)	PS
Inherent as President of the Assembly of the Republic	Assunção Esteves (2011–2015)	PSD
Inherent as President of the Assembly of the Republic	Eduardo Ferro Rodrigues (2015–2022)	PS
Inherent as President of the Assembly of the Republic	Augusto Santos Silva (2022–2024)	PS
Inherent as Prime Ministers	Francisco Pinto Balsemão (1982–1983)	PSD
Inherent as Prime Ministers	Mário Soares (1983–1985)	PS
Inherent as Prime Ministers	Aníbal Cavaco Silva (1985–1995)	PSD
Inherent as Prime Ministers	António Guterres (1995–2002)	PS
Inherent as Prime Ministers	José Manuel Durão Barroso (2002–2004)	PSD
Inherent as Prime Ministers	Pedro Santana Lopes (2004–2005)	PSD
Inherent as Prime Ministers	José Sócrates (2005–2011)	PS
Inherent as Prime Ministers	Pedro Passos Coelho (2011–2015)	PSD
Inherent as Prime Ministers	António Costa (2015–2024)	PS
Inherent as President of the Constitutional Court	Armando Manuel Marques Guedes (1983–1989)	PSD
Inherent as President of the Constitutional Court	José Cardoso da Costa (1989–2003)	CDS–PP
Inherent as President of the Constitutional Court	Luís Nunes de Almeida (2003–2004)	PS
Inherent as President of the Constitutional Court	Artur Maurício (2004–2007)	PS
Inherent as President of the Constitutional Court	Rui Moura Ramos (2007–2012)	PSD
Inherent as President of the Constitutional Court	Joaquim Sousa Ribeiro (2012–2016)	PS
Inherent as President of the Constitutional Court	Manuel da Costa Andrade (2016–2021)	PSD
Inherent as President of the Constitutional Court	João Caupers (2021–2023)	PS
Inherent as President of the Constitutional Court	José João Abrantes (2023–2026)	PS
Inherent as Ombudsman	Eudoro Pamplona Corte-Real (1982–1985)	Ind.
Inherent as Ombudsman	Ângelo d'Almeida Ribeiro (1985–1990)	Ind.
Inherent as Ombudsman	Mário Raposo (1990–1991)	PSD
Inherent as Ombudsman	José Menéres Pimentel (1992–2000)	PSD
Inherent as Ombudsman	Henrique do Nascimento Rodrigues (2000–2009)	PSD
Inherent as Ombudsman	Alfredo José de Sousa (2009–2013)	Ind.
Inherent as Ombudsman	José de Faria Costa (2013–2017)	Ind.
Inherent as Ombudsman	Maria Lúcia Amaral (2017–2025)	Ind.
Inherent as President of the Regional Government of Madeira	Alberto João Jardim (1982–2015)	PSD
Inherent as President of the Regional Government of the Azores	João Bosco Mota Amaral (1982–1995)	PSD
Inherent as President of the Regional Government of the Azores	Alberto Madruga da Costa (1995–1996)	PSD
Inherent as President of the Regional Government of the Azores	Carlos César (1996–2012)	PS
Inherent as President of the Regional Government of the Azores	Vasco Cordeiro (2012–2020)	PS
Designated by President Ramalho Eanes (1982–1986)	Alfredo Nobre da Costa	Ind.
Designated by President Ramalho Eanes (1982–1986)	Ernesto Melo Antunes	Ind.
Designated by President Ramalho Eanes (1982–1986)	Henrique de Barros	Ind./PRD
Designated by President Ramalho Eanes (1982–1986)	Jorge de Figueiredo Dias	Ind.
Designated by President Ramalho Eanes (1982–1986)	Miguel Galvão Teles	Ind./PRD
Designated by President Mário Soares (1986–1996)	Alfredo Nobre da Costa	Ind.
Designated by President Mário Soares (1986–1996)	António de Almeida Santos (resigned Nov. 1995)	PS
Designated by President Mário Soares (1986–1996)	António Dias da Cunha (replaced Almeida Santos)	Ind.
Designated by President Mário Soares (1986–1996)	Joaquim Pinto Correia (resigned Sep. 1987)	PSD
Designated by President Mário Soares (1986–1996)	João Fraústo da Silva (replaced Pinto Correia)	Ind.
Designated by President Mário Soares (1986–1996)	José Gomes Mota	Ind.
Designated by President Mário Soares (1986–1996)	Rui de Alarcão	Ind.
Designated by President Jorge Sampaio (1996–2006)	Carlos Carvalhas	PCP
Designated by President Jorge Sampaio (1996–2006)	Ernesto Melo Antunes (died Aug. 1999)	PS
Designated by President Jorge Sampaio (1996–2006)	João Cravinho (replaced Melo Antunes)	PS
Designated by President Jorge Sampaio (1996–2006)	José Galvão Teles	PS
Designated by President Jorge Sampaio (1996–2006)	Maria de Jesus Serra Lopes	Ind.
Designated by President Jorge Sampaio (1996–2006)	Vítor Constâncio	PS
Designated by President Aníbal Cavaco Silva (2006–2016)	João Lobo Antunes	Ind.
Designated by President Aníbal Cavaco Silva (2006–2016)	Marcelo Rebelo de Sousa	PSD
Designated by President Aníbal Cavaco Silva (2006–2016)	Manuela Ferreira Leite (resigned Jun. 2008)	PSD
Designated by President Aníbal Cavaco Silva (2006–2016)	Leonor Beleza (replaced Ferreira Leite)	PSD
Designated by President Aníbal Cavaco Silva (2006–2016)	Manuel Dias Loureiro (resigned May 2009)	PSD
Designated by President Aníbal Cavaco Silva (2006–2016)	Vítor Bento (replaced Dias Loureiro)	Ind.
Designated by President Aníbal Cavaco Silva (2006–2016)	Miguel Anacoreta Correia (2006–2011)	CDS–PP
Designated by President Aníbal Cavaco Silva (2006–2016)	António Bagão Félix (2011–2016)	PSD
Designated by President Marcelo Rebelo de Sousa (2016–2026)	António Lobo Xavier	CDS–PP
Designated by President Marcelo Rebelo de Sousa (2016–2026)	António Guterres (resigned Nov. 2016)	PS
Designated by President Marcelo Rebelo de Sousa (2016–2026)	António Damásio (replaced Guterres; resigned Feb. 2024)	Ind.
Designated by President Marcelo Rebelo de Sousa (2016–2026)	Joana Carneiro (replaced Damásio)	Ind.
Designated by President Marcelo Rebelo de Sousa (2016–2026)	Eduardo Lourenço (died 1 Dec. 2020)	Ind.
Designated by President Marcelo Rebelo de Sousa (2016–2026)	Lídia Jorge (replaced Lourenço)	Ind.
Designated by President Marcelo Rebelo de Sousa (2016–2026)	Luís Marques Mendes	PSD
Designated by President Marcelo Rebelo de Sousa (2016–2026)	Leonor Beleza	PSD
Elected by Parliament in 1982 (2nd Legislature)	Carlos Mota Pinto	PSD
Elected by Parliament in 1982 (2nd Legislature)	Mário Soares	PS
Elected by Parliament in 1982 (2nd Legislature)	Álvaro Cunhal	PCP
Elected by Parliament in 1982 (2nd Legislature)	Nuno Rodrigues dos Santos	PSD
Elected by Parliament in 1982 (2nd Legislature)	Diogo Freitas do Amaral	CDS
Elected by Parliament in 1983 (3rd Legislature)	António Macedo	PS
Elected by Parliament in 1983 (3rd Legislature)	Carlos Mota Pinto (died May 1985)	PSD
Elected by Parliament in 1983 (3rd Legislature)	Leonardo Ribeiro de Almeida (replaced Mota Pinto)	PSD
Elected by Parliament in 1983 (3rd Legislature)	Álvaro Cunhal	PCP
Elected by Parliament in 1983 (3rd Legislature)	Raul Rego	PS
Elected by Parliament in 1983 (3rd Legislature)	Francisco Lucas Pires	CDS
Elected by Parliament in 1986 (4th Legislature)	Amândio de Azevedo	PSD
Elected by Parliament in 1986 (4th Legislature)	António Macedo	PS
Elected by Parliament in 1986 (4th Legislature)	Hermínio Martinho	PRD
Elected by Parliament in 1986 (4th Legislature)	Álvaro Cunhal	PCP
Elected by Parliament in 1986 (4th Legislature)	António Barbosa de Melo	PSD
Elected by Parliament in 1987 (5th Legislature)	António Barbosa de Melo	PSD
Elected by Parliament in 1987 (5th Legislature)	Eurico de Melo	PSD
Elected by Parliament in 1987 (5th Legislature)	Vítor Constâncio	PS
Elected by Parliament in 1987 (5th Legislature)	Leonardo Ribeiro de Almeida	PSD
Elected by Parliament in 1987 (5th Legislature)	Álvaro Cunhal	PCP
Elected by Parliament in 1992 (6th Legislature)	Eurico de Melo	PSD
Elected by Parliament in 1992 (6th Legislature)	Jorge Sampaio	PS
Elected by Parliament in 1992 (6th Legislature)	Vítor Crespo	PSD
Elected by Parliament in 1992 (6th Legislature)	António Guterres	PS
Elected by Parliament in 1992 (6th Legislature)	Mário Montalvão Machado	PSD
Elected by Parliament in 1996 (7th Legislature)	Manuel Alegre	PS
Elected by Parliament in 1996 (7th Legislature)	Eurico de Melo	PSD
Elected by Parliament in 1996 (7th Legislature)	Fernando Gomes	PS
Elected by Parliament in 1996 (7th Legislature)	António Barbosa de Melo	PSD
Elected by Parliament in 1996 (7th Legislature)	José Gomes Canotilho	PS
Elected by Parliament in 2000 (8th Legislature)	Manuel Alegre	PS
Elected by Parliament in 2000 (8th Legislature)	António Barbosa de Melo	PSD
Elected by Parliament in 2000 (8th Legislature)	João Soares	PS
Elected by Parliament in 2000 (8th Legislature)	Marcelo Rebelo de Sousa (resigned Dec. 2001)	PSD
Elected by Parliament in 2000 (8th Legislature)	João Bosco Mota Amaral (replaced Rebelo de Sousa)	PSD
Elected by Parliament in 2000 (8th Legislature)	José Gomes Canotilho	PS
Elected by Parliament in 2002 (9th Legislature)	António Barbosa de Melo	PSD
Elected by Parliament in 2002 (9th Legislature)	Eduardo Ferro Rodrigues (resigned Jul. 2004)	PS
Elected by Parliament in 2002 (9th Legislature)	Manuel Alegre (replaced Ferro Rodrigues)	PS
Elected by Parliament in 2002 (9th Legislature)	António Capucho	PSD
Elected by Parliament in 2002 (9th Legislature)	António de Almeida Santos	PS
Elected by Parliament in 2002 (9th Legislature)	Paulo Portas	CDS–PP
Elected by Parliament in 2005 (10th Legislature)	António de Almeida Santos	PS
Elected by Parliament in 2005 (10th Legislature)	Luís Marques Mendes (resigned Oct. 2007)	PSD
Elected by Parliament in 2005 (10th Legislature)	António Capucho (replaced Marques Mendes)	PSD
Elected by Parliament in 2005 (10th Legislature)	Manuel Alegre	PS
Elected by Parliament in 2005 (10th Legislature)	Jorge Coelho (resigned Apr. 2008)	PS
Elected by Parliament in 2005 (10th Legislature)	José Gomes Canotilho (replaced Coelho)	PS
Elected by Parliament in 2005 (10th Legislature)	Francisco Pinto Balsemão	PSD
Elected by Parliament in 2010 (11th Legislature)	António de Almeida Santos	PS
Elected by Parliament in 2010 (11th Legislature)	Francisco Pinto Balsemão	PSD
Elected by Parliament in 2010 (11th Legislature)	Manuel Alegre	PS
Elected by Parliament in 2010 (11th Legislature)	António Capucho	PSD
Elected by Parliament in 2010 (11th Legislature)	José Gomes Canotilho	PS
Elected by Parliament in 2011 (12th Legislature)	Francisco Pinto Balsemão	PSD
Elected by Parliament in 2011 (12th Legislature)	António José Seguro (resigned Sep. 2014)	PS
Elected by Parliament in 2011 (12th Legislature)	Alfredo Bruto da Costa (replaced Seguro)	PS
Elected by Parliament in 2011 (12th Legislature)	Luís Marques Mendes	PSD
Elected by Parliament in 2011 (12th Legislature)	Manuel Alegre	PS
Elected by Parliament in 2011 (12th Legislature)	Luís Filipe Menezes	PSD
Elected by Parliament in 2016 (13th Legislature)	Carlos César	PS
Elected by Parliament in 2016 (13th Legislature)	Francisco Pinto Balsemão	PSD
Elected by Parliament in 2016 (13th Legislature)	Francisco Louçã	BE
Elected by Parliament in 2016 (13th Legislature)	Adriano Moreira	CDS–PP
Elected by Parliament in 2016 (13th Legislature)	Domingos Abrantes	PCP
Elected by Parliament in 2020 (14th Legislature)	Carlos César	PS
Elected by Parliament in 2020 (14th Legislature)	Francisco Pinto Balsemão	PSD
Elected by Parliament in 2020 (14th Legislature)	Francisco Louçã	BE
Elected by Parliament in 2020 (14th Legislature)	Rui Rio	PSD
Elected by Parliament in 2020 (14th Legislature)	Domingos Abrantes	PCP
Elected by Parliament in 2022 (15th Legislature)	Carlos César	PS
Elected by Parliament in 2022 (15th Legislature)	Francisco Pinto Balsemão	PSD
Elected by Parliament in 2022 (15th Legislature)	Manuel Alegre	PS
Elected by Parliament in 2022 (15th Legislature)	António Sampaio da Nóvoa	PS
Elected by Parliament in 2022 (15th Legislature)	Miguel Cadilhe	PSD
Elected by Parliament in 2024 (16th Legislature)	Francisco Pinto Balsemão (died Oct. 2025)	PSD
Elected by Parliament in 2024 (16th Legislature)	Carlos Moedas	PSD
Elected by Parliament in 2024 (16th Legislature)	Pedro Nuno Santos	PS
Elected by Parliament in 2024 (16th Legislature)	Carlos César	PS
Elected by Parliament in 2024 (16th Legislature)	André Ventura	CH
