= 8th Legislature of the Third Portuguese Republic =

←	7th Legislature	9th Legislature	→

Overview
- Legislative body: Assembly of the Republic
- Meeting place: Palace of Saint Benedict
- Term: 25 October 1999 – 4 April 2002
- Election: 10 October 1999
- Government: XIV Constitutional Government
- Website: parlamento.pt

Deputies
- Members: 230
- President: António de Almeida Santos (PS)
- First Vice-President: Manuel Alegre (PS)
- Second Vice-President: João Bosco Mota Amaral (PPD/PSD)
- Third Vice-President: João Amaral (PCP)
- Fourth Vice-President: Narana Coissoró (CDS–PP)

The 8th Legislature of the Third Portuguese Republic (Portuguese: VIII Legislatura da Terceira República Portuguesa) ran from 25 October 1999 to 4 April 2002. The composition of the Assembly of the Republic, the legislative body of Portugal, was determined by the results of the 1999 legislative election, held on 10 October 1999.

In the aftermath of a worse than expected result for the Socialist Party in the 2001 local elections, Prime Minister António Guterres resigned in order to, in his words, "avoid a political swamp". President Jorge Sampaio dissolved Parliament and called an election for 17 March 2002.

== Election ==
The 9th Portuguese legislative election was held on 10 October 1999. In the election, the Socialist Party (PS) won, being one seat short of a majority.

Party	Assembly of the Republic			
Party	Votes	%	Seats	+/−
PS	2,385,922	44.06	115	+3
PPD/PSD	1,750,158	32.32	81	–7
CDU	487,058	8.99	17	+2
CDS–PP	451,643	8.34	15	±0
BE	132,333	2.44	2	+2
Other/blank/invalid	208,036	3.86	0	±0
Total	5,415,102	100.00	230	±0

== Composition (1999–2002) ==
Party	Parliamentary group leader	Elected		Dissolution	
Party	Parliamentary group leader	Seats	%	Seats	%
PS	Francisco Assis (Porto)	115	50.0	115	50.0
PPD/PSD	António d'Orey Capucho (Setúbal) (1999–2001); Manuela Ferreira Leite (Lisboa) (2001–2002)	81	35.2	81	35.2
PCP	Octávio Teixeira (Setúbal) (1999–2001); Bernardino Soares (Lisbon) (2001–2002)	15	6.5	15	6.5
CDS–PP	Paulo Portas (Aveiro) (1999–2001); Basílio Horta (Viseu) (2001–2002)	15	6.5	14	6.1
PEV	Isabel Castro (Lisbon)	2	0.9	2	0.9
BE	Luís Fazenda (Lisbon)	2	0.9	2	0.9
Independent	Daniel Campelo (Viana do Castelo)	0	0.0	1	0.4
Total		230	100.0	230	100.0

=== Changes ===
- Daniel Campelo, CDS – People's Party (CDS–PP) → Independent: Left the CDS–PP parliamentary group in the aftermath of his support to António Guterres government's State budgets, which created a rift between him and the party.

== Election for President of the Assembly of the Republic ==
To be elected, a candidate needs to reach a minimum of 116 votes. Incumbent President António de Almeida Santos, from the Socialist Party, was easily re-elected:

Election of the President of the Assembly of the Republic
Ballot →	27 October 1999	
Required majority →	116 out of 230	
António de Almeida Santos (PS)	187 / 230	check
Blank ballots	34 / 230	
Invalid ballots	0 / 230	
Absentees	9 / 230	
