= João Barreiras Duarte =

Portuguese politician (1964–2025)

Member of the Assembly of the Republic for Leiria district
- In office 2024–2025
- In office 2002–2005
- In office 1991–1999

Personal details
- Born: 22 October 1964 Bombarral, Portugal
- Died: 15 August 2025 (aged 60)
- Party: PSD

João Carlos Barreiras Duarte (22 October 1964 – 15 August 2025) was a Portuguese politician from the Social Democratic Party who served as a deputy in the Assembly of the Republic for Leiria for four legislatures. Duarte died on 15 August 2025, at the age of 60.

== See also ==
- 6th Legislature of the Third Portuguese Republic
- 7th Legislature of the Third Portuguese Republic
- 9th Legislature of the Third Portuguese Republic
- 16th Legislature of the Third Portuguese Republic
