= 2025 Sintra local election =

Election in Portugal

2025 Sintra local elections
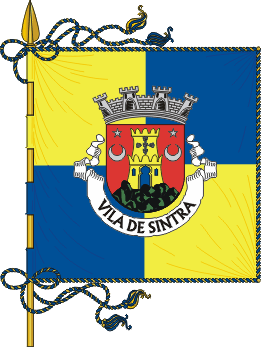
- 12 October 2025

All 11 Councillors in the Sintra City Council 6 seats needed for a majority
- Opinion polls
- Turnout: 50.0% ▲9.9 pp
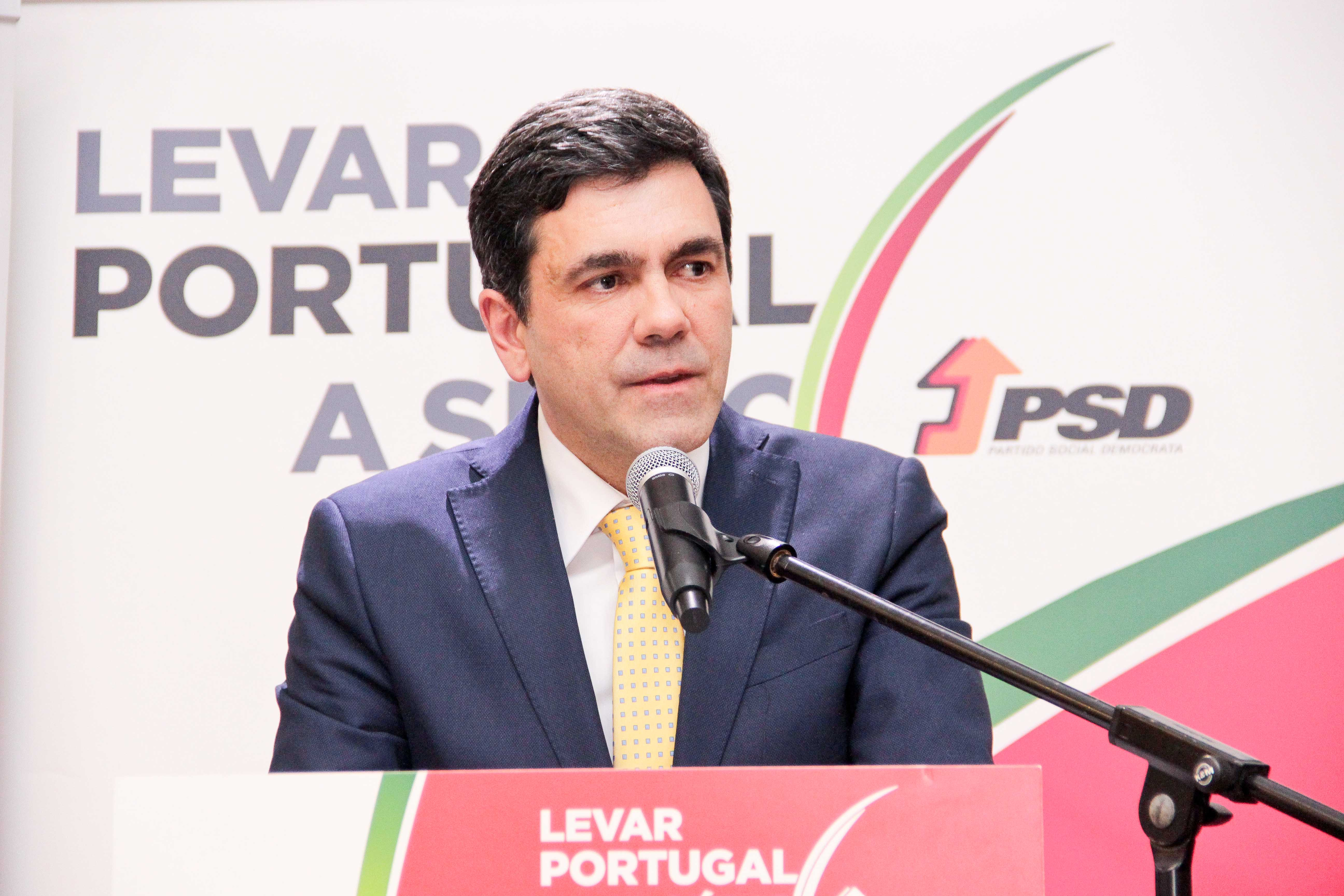

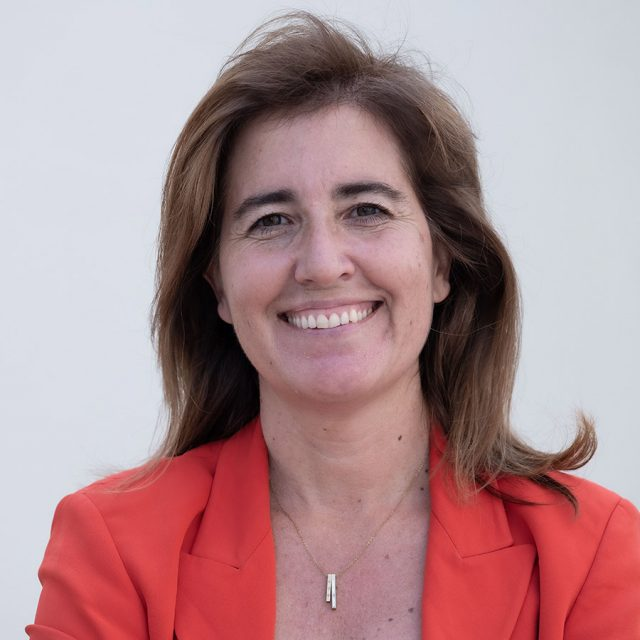

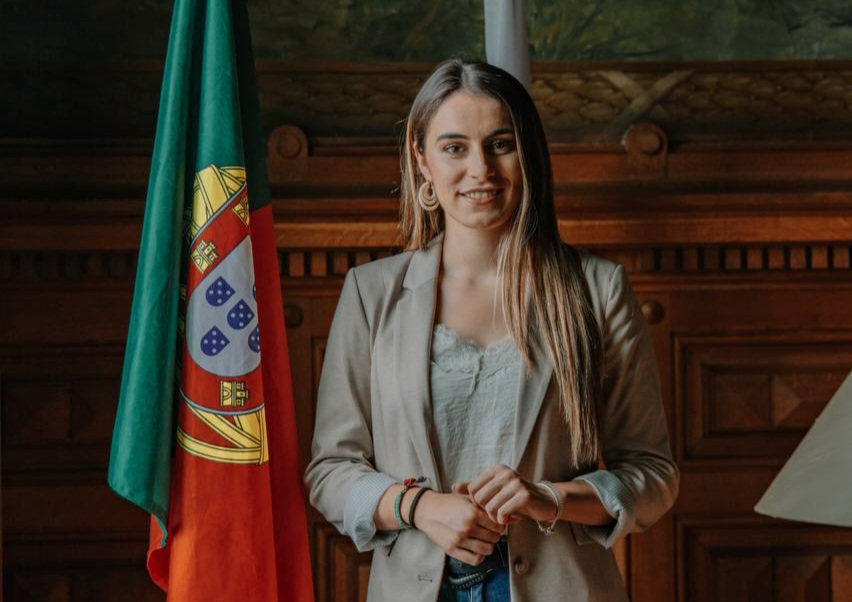
	First party	Second party	Third party
Leader	Marco Almeida	Ana Mendes Godinho	Rita Matias
Party	PSD	PS	CH
Alliance	Always with the People of Sintra (Note: Coalition with PSD, IL and PAN.)	The People, Always (Note: Coalition with PS and LIVRE, also supported by Volt Portugal.)
Last election	3 seats (VCS) (Note: In the 2021 election, PSD/CDS/A/MPT/PDR/PPM/RIR had 4 seats and 27.5% of the votes, PAN had 3.3% and failed to elect any seats, while IL had 2.7% and also failed to elect any seats.)	5 seats, 35.3%	1 seat, 9.1%
Seats won	4	4	3
Seat change	0	▼1	▲2
Popular vote	55,088	51,528	38,048
Percentage	33.9%	31.7%	23.4%
Swing	▲0.4 pp	▼3.6 pp	▲14.3 pp
Mayor before election
Basílio Horta
PS
Elected mayor
Marco Almeida
PSD

The 2025 Sintra local election was held on 12 October 2025 to elect the members for Sintra City Council, Sintra Municipal Assembly and the city's 15 parish assemblies.

Incumbent Mayor Basílio Horta, from the Socialist Party (PS), was ineligible for a fourth term. Former Minister of Labour Ana Mendes Godinho was chosen as the candidate of the PS, in a coalition with LIVRE (L) and supported by Volt Portugal (VP), while former Deputy Mayor Marco Almeida ran for the third time, this time with the support of the Social Democratic Party (PSD), the Liberal Initiative (IL) and People Animals Nature (PAN). Meanwhile, Chega (CH) presented the leader of Chega Youth, Rita Matias, as its candidate.

CDS – People's Party (CDS–PP) broke away with the PSD, after disagreements regarding the lists and the inclusion of the Liberal Initiative, and will contest the election in a coalition with the People's Monarchist Party (PPM) and the National Democratic Alternative (ADN), with local party councillor Maurício Rodrigues as mayoral candidate. The Unitary Democratic Coalition (CDU) repeated their 2021 mayoral candidate and local party councillor Pedro Ventura.

In his 3rd try to reach the office of mayor of Sintra, Marco Almeida (PSD/IL/CDS) was successful, winning nearly 34% of the votes and electing 4 councillors. The PS/LIVRE coalition was close behind, gathering 32% of the voted and also electing the same number of councillors as the PSD led-coalition, four. Chega increased to 23% of the voted and elected 3 councillors. CDU lost its representation in Sintra municipal council for the first time in democracy. Turnout increased with 50% of all registered voters casting a ballot.

== Background ==
Incumbent Mayor Basílio Horta, from the Socialist Party (PS), won a third and final term, with 35.3% of the votes and electing five seats, losing its absolute majority. The coalition between PSD, CDS–PP and their allies, led by Ricardo Baptista Leite, got 27.5% of the votes and elected 4 seats.

Meanwhile, the Unitary Democratic Coalition (CDU), led by Pedro Ventura, managed to hold onto its single councillor, despite a small decrease to 9.0%, while Chega (CH) elected Nuno Afonso as city councillor and got 9.1% of the votes. Nuno Afonso would go on to leave Chega in January 2023 and remained as an Independent councillor.

=== Candidate selection ===
The Social Democratic Party regarded 2025 as the perfect opportunity to retake Sintra, due to Basílio Horta being term limited. Several potential candidates were considered, including former Deputy Mayor and two times candidate Marco Almeida, Figueira da Foz Mayor and former Prime Minister Pedro Santana Lopes, and even television presenter Manuel Luís Goucha. Marco Almeida announced his candidacy in December 2024, stating that he would be a candidate with or without the support of the PSD.

Meanwhile the Socialist Party also had several potential candidates, at a time when some internal polls had the party in third place behind PSD and Chega, such as Deputy Mayor Bruno Parreirão, parliamentary leader Alexandra Leitão, and MP António Mendonça Mendes. Ultimately, the choice fell on former Minister of Labour Ana Mendes Godinho. She ended up negotiating a coalition with LIVRE.

Chega, who lost his own City Councillor after he left the party, also discussed some potential candidates, such as MP Pedro Frazão and the leader of Chega Youth Rita Matias, which was eventually chosen as the party's candidate for Mayor of Sintra.

During the coalition negotiations, PSD decided to make a coalition with the Liberal Initiative and People Animals Nature, while dumping CDS–PP who was seeking to keep their seat in the city council, which caused incumbent City Councillor Maurício Rodrigues to run in a coalition between the CDS–PP, the People's Monarchist Party and the National Democratic Alternative.

== Electoral system ==
Each party or coalition must present a list of candidates. The winner of the most voted list for the municipal council is automatically elected mayor, similar to first-past-the-post (FPTP). The lists are closed and the seats in each municipality are apportioned according to the D'Hondt method. Unlike in national legislative elections, independent lists are allowed to run.

== Parties and candidates ==
Party/Coalition			Political position	Candidate	2021 result		Ref.
Party/Coalition			Political position	Candidate	Votes (%)	Seats	Ref.
APS; The People, Always (As Pessoas, Sempre)	PS	Socialist Party; Partido Socialista	Centre-left	Ana Mendes Godinho	35.3%	5 / 11	
APS; The People, Always (As Pessoas, Sempre)	L	FREE; LIVRE	Center-left to left-wing	Ana Mendes Godinho	—N/a	—N/a	
SCS; Always with the People of Sintra (Sempre com os Sintrenses)	PAN	People Animals Nature; Pessoas-Animais-Natureza	Syncretic	Marco Almeida	3.3%	0 / 11	
SCS; Always with the People of Sintra (Sempre com os Sintrenses)	IL	Liberal Initiative; Iniciativa Liberal	Centre-right to right-wing	Marco Almeida	2.7%	0 / 11	
SCS; Always with the People of Sintra (Sempre com os Sintrenses)	PPD/PSD	Social Democratic Party; Partido Social Democrata	Center-right	Marco Almeida	27.5%	3 / 11	
PSANC (Note: Coalition with CDS–PP, PPM and ADN.); For Sintra, Our Home (Por Sintra, A Nossa Casa)	CDS–PP	CDS – People's Party; CDS – Partido Popular	Center-right to right-wing	Maurício Rodrigues	27.5%	1 / 11	
PSANC; For Sintra, Our Home (Por Sintra, A Nossa Casa)	PPM	People's Monarchist Party; Partido Popular Monárquico	Right-wing	Maurício Rodrigues	27.5%	0 / 11	
PSANC; For Sintra, Our Home (Por Sintra, A Nossa Casa)	ADN	National Democratic Alternative (Note: The National Democratic Alternative (ADN) was in 2021 called the Democratic Republican Party (PDR).); Alternativa Democrática Nacional	Far-right	Maurício Rodrigues	27.5%	0 / 11	
CH	Enough! Chega!		Far-right	Rita Matias	9.1%	1 / 11	
CDU	Unitary Democratic Coalition; Coligação Democrática Unitária PCP, PEV		Left-wing to far-left	Pedro Ventura	9.0%	1 / 11	
BE	Left Bloc; Bloco de Esquerda		Left-wing to far-left	Tânia Russo	5.8%	0 / 11	
ND	New Right; Nova Direita		Right-wing	Júlio Gourgel Ferreira	—N/a	—N/a	

== Campaign period ==
=== Party slogans ===
Party or alliance	Original slogan	English translation	Refs
APS	« As Pessoas, Sempre »	"The People, Always"	
SCS	« Sempre com os Sintrenses »	"Always with the People of Sintra"	
CH	« Sintra na Linha »	"Sintra in Line"	
CDU	« Presta Contas »	"Accountability"	
PSANC	« Por Sintra, A Nossa Casa »	"For Sintra, Our Home"	
BE	« Sintra + Solidária e Sustentável »	"Sintra + Solidarity and Sustainable"	

=== Candidates' debates ===
2025 Sintra local election debates
Date	Organisers	Moderator(s)	P Present (Note: Denotes a main invitee attending the event.) NI Not invited I Invited A Absent invitee						
Date	Organisers	Moderator(s)	APS Godinho	SCS Almeida	CH Matias	CDU Ventura	PSANC Rodrigues	BE Russo	Refs
16 Sep 2025	SIC Notícias	Nelma Serpa Pinto	P	P	P	P	P	P	
22 Sep 2025	RTP3	Luísa Bastos	P	P	P	P	P	P	

== Opinion polling ==
Exit poll

Polling firm/Link	Fieldwork date	Sample size	APS		SCS			PSANC			CH	CDU	BE	ND	O	Lead
Polling firm/Link	Fieldwork date	Sample size	PS	L	PAN	IL	PSD	CDS	PPM	ADN	CH	CDU	BE	ND	O	Lead
2025 local election	12 Oct 2025	—N/a	31.7; 4		33.9; 4			2.1; 0			23.4; 3	4.6; 0	1.6; 0	0.5; 0	2.2	2.2
CESOP–UCP	12 Oct 2025	4,134	32–36; 4/5		33–37; 4/5			1–2; 0			19–22; 2/3	4–6; 0	1–2; 0	0–1; 0	2–4	1
ICS/ISCTE/ Pitagórica	12 Oct 2025	5,679	30.4–35.4; 3/5		32.1–37.3; 3/5			1.1–3.1; 0/1			19.4–23.6; 2/4	3.6–6.6; 0/1	1.0–3.0; 0			1.7
Intercampus	12 Oct 2025	5,653	30.4–34.4; 3/5		33.8–37.8; 4/6			0.0–3.7; 0/1			19.3–23.3; 1/3	3.2–7.2; 0/1	0.0–4.0; 0/1		0.0–3.6	3.4
Aximage	17–23 Sep 2025	508	35.0; 4		31.9; 4			1.1; 0			21.9; 3	6.8; 0	1.1; 0	—N/a	2.2; 0	3.1
Pitagórica	13–18 Sep 2025	500	30.3; 4		32.1; 4			1.6; 0			24.5; 3	5.5; 0	2.1; 0	0.3; 0	3.6	1.8
ICS/ISCTE	3–14 Sep 2025	803	32; 4		30; 4			2; 0			28; 3	3; 0	1; 0	1; 0	3	2
Aximage	11–22 Jul 2025	502	39.5; 5		2.2; 0	38.2; 5		0.3; 0			11.3; 1	2.3; 0	2.9; 0	—N/a	3.3; 0	1.3
2025 Legislative election	18 May 2025	—N/a	23.8 (3)	6.0 (0)	2.1 (0)	6.5 (1)	24.8 (3)		0.1 (0)	1.3 (0)	26.1 (4)	3.1 (0)	2.5 (0)	0.2 (0)	3.7 (0)	1.3
2024 EP election	9 Jun 2024	—N/a	32.9 (5)	4.6 (0)	1.8 (0)	9.6 (1)	24.2 (3)			1.8 (0)	13.1 (2)	4.5 (0)	5.1 (0)	0.2 (0)	2.4 (0)	8.7
2024 Legislative election	10 Mar 2024	—N/a	28.8 (4)	4.6 (0)	2.9 (0)	5.9 (1)	22.5 (3)			1.5 (0)	21.2 (3)	3.3 (0)	5.4 (0)	0.2 (0)	3.9 (0)	6.3
2022 Legislative election	30 Jan 2022	—N/a	44.0 (7)	1.9 (0)	2.3 (0)	6.3 (0)	20.7 (3)	1.3 (0)	—N/a	0.3 (0)	9.7 (1)	4.7 (0)	5.3 (0)	—N/a	3.5 (0)	23.3
2021 local election	26 Sep 2021	—N/a	35.3; 5	—N/a	3.3; 0	2.7; 0	27.5; 4				9.1; 1	9.0; 1	5.8; 0	—N/a	7.3; 0	7.8

== Results ==
=== Municipal Council ===
Summary of the 12 October 2025 Sintra City Council elections results
Graph of the party split among 11 seats.
Parties	Votes	%	±pp swing	Councillors	
Parties	Votes	%	±pp swing	Total	±
PSD / IL / PAN	55,088	33.88	▲0.4	4	0
Socialist / LIVRE	51,528	31.69	▼3.6	4	▼1
Chega	38,048	23.40	▲14.3	3	▲2
Unitary Democratic Coalition	7,531	4.63	▼4.4	0	▼1
CDS–PP / PPM / ADN	3,438	2.11	—N/a	0	—N/a
Left Bloc	2,647	1.63	▼4.2	0	0
New Right	739	0.45	—N/a	0	—N/a
Total valid	159,019	97.79	▲2.2	11	0
Blank ballots	2,085	1.28	▼1.4		
Invalid ballots	1,517	0.93	▲0.8		
Total	162,621	100.00			
Registered voters/turnout	324,885	50.05	▲9.9		

=== Municipal Assembly ===
Summary of the 12 October 2025 Sintra Municipal Assembly elections results
Graph of the party split among 33 seats.
Parties	Votes	%	±pp swing	Seats	
Parties	Votes	%	±pp swing	Total	±
PSD / IL / PAN	52,347	31.97	▼0.6	11	0
Socialist / LIVRE	50,688	30.96	▼2.8	11	▼2
Chega	39,521	24.14	▲14.3	9	▲6
Unitary Democratic Coalition	8,908	5.44	▼4.2	2	▼1
CDS–PP / PPM / ADN	3,760	2.30	—N/a	0	—N/a
Left Bloc	3,504	2.14	▼4.5	0	▼2
New Right	905	0.55	—N/a	0	—N/a
Total valid	159,633	97.49	▲2.1	33	0
Blank ballots	2,478	1.51	▼1.3		
Invalid ballots	1,634	1.00	▲0.8		
Total	163,745	100.00			
Registered voters/turnout	324,885	50.40	▲10.2		

=== Parish Assemblies ===
Results of the 12 October 2025 Sintra Parish Assembly elections
Parish	%	S	%	S	%	S	%	S	Total S
Parish	SCS		APS		CH		CDU		Total S
Agualva e Mira-Sintra	28.0	6	35.3	7	25.1	5	5.4	1	19
Algueirão–Mem Martins	31.3	7	30.6	7	25.4	6	5.5	1	21
Almargem do Bispo	35.5	5	28.4	4	26.6	4	4.3	-	13
Belas	34.2	7	28.3	6	24.9	5	5.6	1	19
Cacém e São Marcos	28.7	6	30.0	6	27.3	6	5.6	1	19
Casal de Cambra	15.5	2	53.9	8	21.4	3	3.3	-	13
Colares	42.1	6	27.5	4	14.3	2	7.6	1	13
Massamá e Monte Abraão	32.2	8	34.9	8	19.4	4	6.2	1	21
Montelavar	38.7	4	37.4	4	14.1	1	4.8	-	9
Pêro Pinheiro	49.5	5	18.9	2	21.1	2	3.7	-	9
Queluz	23.5	5	33.0	7	27.1	6	7.9	1	19
Rio de Mouro	29.2	7	31.8	7	25.8	6	6.3	1	21
Santa Maria e São Miguel, São Martinho e São Pedro de Penaferrim	42.5	9	26.1	5	18.4	4	5.5	1	19
São João das Lampas	46.2	7	25.1	3	19.6	3	3.9	-	13
Terrugem	39.2	4	33.9	3	19.7	2	3.0	-	9
Total	32.4	88	31.6	81	23.4	59	5.6	9	237

== Aftermath ==
Marco Almeida was sworn in as mayor on 1 November 2025, under a minority. A few days later, Almeida forged a coalition deal with Chega, giving him an absoute majority, however, the Liberal Initiative removed their political confidence in its sole councillor for being against the deal with Chega.
