= Vítor Pereira Crespo =

Portuguese politician (1932–2014)

Minister of Education and Science
- In office 1980–1981
- Preceded by: Luís Veiga da Cunha
- Succeeded by: Himself

Minister of Education and Universities
- In office 1981–1983
- Preceded by: Himself
- Succeeded by: João José Fraústo da Silva

President of the Assembly of the Republic
- In office 25 August 1987 – 3 November 1991
- Preceded by: Fernando Monteiro do Amaral
- Succeeded by: António Barbosa de Melo

Personal details
- Born: December 2, 1932 Milagres, Leiria, Portugal
- Died: September 30, 2014 (aged 81)
- Party: Partido Social Democrata
- Occupation: Professor, politician

Vítor Pereira Crespo (2 December 1932 – 30 September 2014) was a Portuguese politician.

== Career ==
Crespo was born in Milagres, Leiria. He graduated as a Licentiate in Physical chemistry from the Faculty of Sciences of the University of Coimbra, where he became a Cathedratic Professor at the Faculty of Sciences and Technology.

He was elected Deputy to the Assembly of the Republic for the Social Democratic Party (PSD) from 1979. Until the 14th Congress of his Party in 1988, he was also the Vice-President of its National Political Commission, as well as the President of its Parliamentary Group from 1982 to 1983.

He was Minister of Education and Science in the 7th and 8th Constitutional Governments and of Education and Universities in the 8th (1980–1983).

Between 1984 and 1985 he was an Ambassador and a Permanent Representative of Portugal at the UNESCO, in Paris.

He was elected the 8th President of the Assembly of the Republic during the 5th Legislature (25 August 1987 - 3 November 1991). He was also a Member of the Portuguese Council of State as the President of the Assembly of the Republic during the same period.

== Family ==
He married Maria Eugénia Nunes Beja, born in Covilhã, 2 July 1930, and had one daughter:

- Maria Raquel Nunes Pereira Crespo (born Lisbon, São Sebastião da Pedreira, 7 November 1962), married in Lisbon, São Vicente de Fora, at the Monastery of São Vicente de Fora on 3 August 1985 to José Luís Lopes Fiadeiro (born Lisbon, São Sebastião da Pedreira, 9 October 1961), the son of José Manuel Monteiro Fiadeiro (born Lisbon, São Sebastião da Pedreira, 11 December 1935, whose maternal grandfather's maternal grandfather was French and whose maternal grandmother's paternal grandfather was English) and wife (m. Lisbon, Nossa Senhora de Fátima, Church of Our Lady of Fátima, 21 September 1960) Maria Luísa Seixas Lopes (born Lisbon, São Jorge de Arroios, 31 October 1939), and had two daughters:
  - Rebeca Pereira Crespo Fiadeiro (born Lisbon, São Sebastião da Pedreira, 9 February 1993)
  - Rute Pereira Crespo Fiadeiro (born Lisbon, Benfica, 7 August 1997)
