= Francisco Sá Carneiro =

Portuguese politician (1934–1980)

His Excellency Francisco Sá Carneiro GCTE GCC GCL
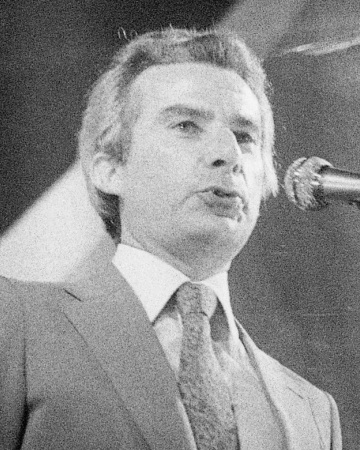

Prime Minister of Portugal
- In office 3 January 1980 – 4 December 1980
- President: António Ramalho Eanes
- Deputy: Diogo Freitas do Amaral
- Preceded by: Maria de Lurdes Pintasilgo
- Succeeded by: Francisco Pinto Balsemão

President of the Social Democratic Party
- In office 2 July 1978 – 4 December 1980
- Secretary-General: Amândio de Azevedo; António Capucho
- Preceded by: José Menéres Pimentel
- Succeeded by: Francisco Pinto Balsemão
- In office 31 October 1976 – 11 November 1977
- Secretary-General: Joaquim Magalhães Mota
- Preceded by: Office established
- Succeeded by: António de Sousa Franco

Secretary-General of the Social Democratic Party
- In office 28 September 1975 – 31 October 1976
- Preceded by: Emídio Guerreiro
- Succeeded by: Joaquim Magalhães Mota
- In office 24 November 1974 – 25 May 1975
- Preceded by: Office established
- Succeeded by: Emídio Guerreiro

Minister in the Cabinet of the Prime Minister
- In office 17 May 1974 – 17 July 1974
- Prime Minister: Adelino da Palma Carlos
- Preceded by: Mário Morais de Oliveira
- Succeeded by: António de Almeida Santos

Minister without Portfolio
- In office 16 May 1974 – 17 July 1974
- Prime Minister: Adelino da Palma Carlos
- Preceded by: Office established
- Succeeded by: Ernesto Melo Antunes; Joaquim Magalhães Mota; Vítor Alves

Member of the Assembly of the Republic
- In office 13 November 1980 – 4 December 1980
- Constituency: Lisbon
- In office 2 June 1975 – 12 November 1980
- Constituency: Porto

Member of the National Assembly
- In office 25 November 1969 – 25 January 1973
- Constituency: Porto

Personal details
- Born: 19 July 1934 Vitória, Porto, Portugal
- Died: 4 December 1980 (aged 46) Camarate, Loures, Portugal
- Party: Social Democratic (1974–1980)
- Other political affiliations: Democratic Alliance (1979–1980); Liberal Wing (1968–1973)
- Spouse: Isabel Nunes de Matos (m. 1957)
- Domestic partner: Snu Abecassis (1976–1980)
- Children: 5
- Education: University of Lisbon

Francisco Manuel Lumbrales de Sá Carneiro GCTE GCC GCL (Portuguese: [fɾɐ̃ˈsiʃku ˈsa kɐɾˈnɐjɾu]; 19 July 1934 – 4 December 1980) was a Portuguese politician, who was one of the founders and the first leader of the Social Democratic Party (then known as the Popular Democratic Party). He served as Prime Minister of Portugal for eleven months during 1980, until his death in a plane crash in Camarate on 4 December 1980.

== Background ==
Sá Carneiro was born in Vitória, Porto, the fifth of the eight children of lawyer José Gualberto Chaves Marques de Sá Carneiro (1897–1978) and Maria Francisca Judite Pinto da Costa Leite (1908–1989) of the Counts of Lumbrales in Spain.

== Career ==
A lawyer by training, Sá Carneiro became a member of the National Assembly in 1969 and, in turn, one of the leaders of the "Liberal Wing" (Ala Liberal) which attempted to work for the gradual transformation of Marcelo Caetano's dictatorship into a Western European liberal democracy.

In May 1974, a month after the Carnation Revolution, Sá Carneiro founded the Popular Democratic Party (PPD), together with Francisco Pinto Balsemão, Joaquim Magalhães Mota, Carlos Mota Pinto, João Bosco Mota Amaral, Alberto João Jardim, António Barbosa de Melo and António Marques Mendes, and became its secretary-general. The PPD was soon renamed the Social Democratic Party (PSD); despite Sá Carneiro's original claims to be leading a left-of-centre party, he and the party soon drifted to the right, becoming the country's main centre-right force. He was minister without portfolio in a number of provisional governments, and was elected as a deputy to the Constitutional Assembly the next year.

In 1976, he was elected to the Assembly of the Republic. In November 1977, he resigned his office as president of the party, only to be reelected to that office the next year.

In the general election of late 1979, he led the Democratic Alliance, a coalition of his Social Democratic Party, the right-wing Democratic and Social Centre Party, and two smaller parties, to victory. The Alliance polled 45.2 percent of the popular vote and gained 128 of the 250 seats in the Assembly of the Republic; 75 of these were from the PSD. President António Ramalho Eanes subsequently called on him to form a government on 3 January 1980, and formed Portugal's first majority government since the Carnation Revolution of 1974. In a second general election held in October that year, the Democratic Alliance increased its majority. The Alliance received 47.2 percent of the popular vote and 134 seats, 82 of them from the PSD. Sá Carneiro's triumph appeared to augur well for the presidential election two months later, in which Sá Carneiro was supporting António Soares Carneiro (no relation).

== Death ==
Francisco de Sá Carneiro, by Patrick Swift, 1980; Following his election Sá Carneiro commissioned Swift to paint his portrait

His victory was short-lived, however. On 4 December 1980, while on his way to a presidential election rally in Porto, the Cessna 421 he was on crashed into a building in Camarate, Loures, soon after takeoff from Lisbon Airport. Eyewitnesses claimed they saw pieces falling from the plane just moments after it took off. Rumours have continued to fuel conspiracy theories that the crash was in fact an assassination, but no firm evidence has come to light. There were even different theories as to who might have been the target of such an assassination, as Francisco de Sá Carneiro was travelling with the Defence Minister, Adelino Amaro da Costa, who had said he had documents relating to the October surprise conspiracy theory and was planning on taking them to the United Nations General Assembly. A parliamentary inquiry said in 2004 that there was evidence of a bomb in the aircraft, after a 1995 inquiry had concluded there was evidence of sabotage.

Dependent to a considerable extent on Sá Carneiro's personal popularity, the Democratic Alliance was unable to maintain its momentum in the wake of his death. Faced with a national crisis, the public rallied behind the incumbent president, António Ramalho Eanes, who easily defeated the Alliance candidate in the presidential election a few days later.

The Pedra Rubras airport where Sá Carneiro was heading has been named after him as Francisco de Sá Carneiro Airport, in 1990, despite objections that it would be in bad taste to name an airport after someone who died in a plane crash.

== Family ==
He was married on 13 May 1957, in Miragaia, Porto, to Isabel Maria Ferreira Nunes de Matos (1 October 1936, Miragaia, Porto), and had five children:

- Francisco Nunes de Matos de Sá Carneiro (12 March 1958, Cedofeita, Porto), unmarried and without issue
- Isabel Maria Nunes de Matos de Sá Carneiro (7 July 1959, Cedofeita, Porto), unmarried and without issue
- Maria Teresa Nunes de Matos de Sá Carneiro (11 August 1961, Cedofeita, Porto), had two sons:
  - Francisco de Sá Carneiro e Nogueira (1986, Santo Ildefonso, Porto)
  - Lourenço de Sá Carneiro e Nogueira (1988, Santo Ildefonso, Porto)
- José Nunes de Matos de Sá Carneiro (1 April 1963, Cedofeita, Porto), married on 8 September 1991, in Luso, Mealhada, Isabel Maria Guedes de Macedo Girão (25 January 1965, Ramalde, Porto), and had an only daughter:
  - Inês de Macedo Girão de Sá Carneiro (21 March 1992, Santo Ildefonso, Porto)
- Pedro Nunes de Matos de Sá Carneiro (12 September 1964, Cedofeita, Porto), married to Maria Benedita de Matos Chaves Pinheiro Torres (28 May 1967), of the Barons of Torre de Pero Palha, and had an only daughter:
  - Maria Teresa Pinheiro Torres de Sá Carneiro (17 August 2000, Porto)

Later in life he lived together with Snu Abecassis, who died in the same accident as Sá Carneiro.

== Ideological assessment and legacy ==
Sá Carneiro started his political life in the youth of the Acção Católica (the Portuguese Catholic Action), being his first activity in civic life to write a letter to Marcelo Caetano requesting the return of the António Ferreira Gomes, the exiled pro-democracy bishop of Oporto. He probably had links with the Catholic syndicalist organizations and Christian socialism in general. He was very influenced by Catholic personalism and humanism (especially its Christian version).

Sá Carneiro tried to adapt the social-democratic ideas of the likes of Eduard Bernstein and the post-1945 SPD to the cultural context of Portugal and its traditionally Catholic society. The Godesberg Program had a very important influence in his social democratic thought as it became the model for his party and its cut with Marxist socialism.

Despite having an anti-collectivist and anti-statist party with an emphasis on personal rights and duties that was responsible for privatizing the industrial sectors nationalized during the revolutionary period, he increased social spending during his term, supported land reform and its redistribution in Alentejo and he was proud that his party had been adopted by the working, middle-class blue-collar worker and middle-low class workers and that his party defended "the construction of a socialist society in liberty". Due to all these specificities, he called his party's ideology "Portuguese Social Democracy".

He was recognized as populist by supporters and opponents, as well as neutral analysts.

== Works ==
Sá Carneiro was the author of various works, among them:

- Uma Tentativa de Participação Política (An Attempt of Political Participation) (1973)
- Por uma Social-Democracia Portuguesa (For a Portuguese Social Democracy) (1975)
- Poder Civil; Autoridade Democrática e Social-Democracia (Civilian Power; Democratic Authority and Social Democracy (1975)
- Uma Constituição para os Anos 80: Contributo para um Projecto de Revisão (A Constitution for the 1980s: Contribution for a Project of Revision) (1979).

== Electoral history ==
=== Constituent Assembly, 1975 ===
Ballot: 25 April 1975
Party	Candidate	Votes	%	Seats
PS	Mário Soares	2,162,972	37.9	116
PPD	Francisco Sá Carneiro	1,507,282	26.4	81
PCP	Álvaro Cunhal	711,935	12.5	30
CDS	Diogo Freitas do Amaral	434,879	7.6	16
MDP/CDE	Francisco Pereira de Moura	236,318	4.1	5
FSP	Manuel Serra	66,307	1.2	0
MES	Afonso de Barros	58,248	1.0	0
Other parties		137,213	2.4	2
Blank/Invalid ballots		396,675	7.0	–
Turnout		5,711,829	91.66	250
Source: Comissão Nacional de Eleições

=== Legislative election, 1976 ===
Ballot: 25 April 1976
Party	Candidate	Votes	%	Seats	+/−
PS	Mário Soares	1,912,921	34.9	107	–9
PPD	Francisco Sá Carneiro	1,335,381	24.4	73	–8
CDS	Diogo Freitas do Amaral	876,007	16.0	42	+26
PCP	Álvaro Cunhal	788,830	14.4	40	+10
UDP	Mário Tomé	91,690	1.7	1	±0
Other parties		220,936	4.0	0	±0
Blank/Invalid ballots		257,696	2.7	–	–
Turnout		5,483,461	83.53	263	+13
Source: Comissão Nacional de Eleições

=== PSD leadership election, 1978 ===
Ballot: 2 July 1978
Candidate	Votes	%
Francisco Sá Carneiro	603	91.9
Blank/Invalid ballots	53	8.1
Turnout	656	
Source: Diário de Lisboa

=== Legislative election, 1979 ===
Ballot: 2 December 1979
Party	Candidate	Votes	%	Seats	+/−
AD	Francisco Sá Carneiro	2,719,208	45.3	128	+13
PS	Mário Soares	1,642,136	27.3	74	–33
APU	Álvaro Cunhal	1,129,322	18.8	47	+7
UDP	Mário Tomé	130,842	2.2	1	±0
PDC	José Sanches Osório	72,514	1.2	0	±0
Other parties		149,717	2.5	0	±0
Blank/Invalid ballots		163,714	2.7	–	–
Turnout		6,007,453	82.86	250	–13
Source: Comissão Nacional de Eleições

=== Legislative election, 1980 ===
Ballot: 5 October 1980
Party	Candidate	Votes	%	Seats	+/−
AD	Francisco Sá Carneiro	2,868,076	47.6	134	+6
PS	Mário Soares	1,673,279	27.8	74	±0
APU	Álvaro Cunhal	1,009,505	16.8	41	–6
UDP	Mário Tomé	83,204	1.4	1	±0
POUS	Carmelinda Pereira	83,095	1.4	0	±0
PSR	–	60,496	1.0	0	±0
Other parties		111,078	1.8	0	±0
Blank/Invalid ballots		137,692	2.3	–	–
Turnout		6,026,395	83.94	250	±0
Source: Comissão Nacional de Eleições

== Honours ==
- Grand-Cross of the Order of Christ, Portugal (29 May 1981)
- Grand-Cross of the Order of the Tower and of the Sword, of Valour, Loyalty and Merit, Portugal (7 March 1986)
- Grand Cross of the Order of Liberty, Portugal (29 November 1990)

== See also ==
- Liberalism in Portugal

Political offices
New office	Minister without Portfolio; 1974; Served alongside: Álvaro Cunhal, Francisco Pereira de Moura	Succeeded by Ernesto Melo Antunes; Joaquim Magalhães Mota; Vítor Alves
Preceded by Mário Morais de Oliveira	Deputy Minister of the Prime Minister; 1974	Succeeded by António de Almeida Santos
Preceded by Maria de Lourdes Pintasilgo	Prime Minister of Portugal; 1980	Succeeded by Francisco Pinto Balsemão
Party political offices
New political party	Secretary-General of the Social Democratic Party; 1974–1975	Succeeded by Emídio Guerreiro
New office	President of the Social Democratic Party; 1975–1978; 1979–1980	Succeeded by Francisco Pinto Balsemão
Preceded by José Menéres Pimentel	President of the Social Democratic Party; 1975–1978; 1979–1980	Succeeded by António de Sousa Franco
