= António Barbosa de Melo =

Portuguese lawyer, politician, and parliamentarian

9th President of the Assembly of the Republic
- In office 7 November 1991 – 26 November 1995
- Preceded by: Victor Crespo
- Succeeded by: António de Almeida Santos

Personal details
- Born: November 2, 1932 Lagares, Penafiel, Portugal
- Died: September 7, 2016 (aged 83) Coimbra, Portugal
- Party: Social Democratic Party (PSD)
- Profession: Jurist, politician

António Moreira Barbosa de Melo, GColL (2 November 1932 – 7 September 2016) was a Portuguese lawyer, politician, and parliamentarian on several occasions.

== Career ==
de Melo was born in Lagares, Penafiel, in 1932. He graduated with a Licentiate and a Doctorate in Law from the Faculty of Law of the University of Coimbra, where he became an investigator and a Cathedratic Professor.

He was one of the founders of the Popular Democratic Party together with Francisco Sá Carneiro, Francisco Pinto Balsemão, Joaquim Magalhães Mota, Carlos Mota Pinto, João Bosco Mota Amaral, Alberto João Jardim and António Marques Mendes, in which he held many offices at its national organization.

He was a member of the commission to the Elaboration of the Electoral Law for the Constituent Assembly in 1974, in which he was also a Deputy, as he was also a member of the Assembly of the Republic from 1976 to 1977 and from 1991 to 1999.

He was elected the 9th President of the Assembly of the Republic during the 6th legislature and served from 7 November 1991 to 26 October 1995. He was also a member of the Portuguese Council of State as the President of the Assembly of the Republic during the same period. de Melo died on 7 September 2016 in Coimbra.
