= 5th Legislature of the Third Portuguese Republic =

←	4th Legislature	6th Legislature	→

Overview
- Legislative body: Assembly of the Republic
- Meeting place: Palace of Saint Benedict
- Term: 13 August 1987 – 3 November 1991
- Election: 19 July 1987
- Government: XI Constitutional Government
- Website: parlamento.pt

Deputies
- Members: 250
- President: Vítor Pereira Crespo (PPD/PSD)
- First Vice-President: Maria Manuela Aguiar (PPD/PSD)
- Second Vice-President: Ferraz de Abreu (PS)
- Third Vice-President: José Manuel Maia (PCP)
- Fourth Vice-President: António Marques Júnior (PRD) (1987–1989); Vacant (1989–1990); Hermínio Martinho (1990–1991)

The 5th Legislature of the Third Portuguese Republic (Portuguese: V Legislatura da Terceira República Portuguesa) ran from 13 August 1987 to 3 November 1991. The composition of the Assembly of the Republic, the legislative body of Portugal, was determined by the results of the 1987 legislative election, held on 19 July 1987.

== Election ==
The 6th Portuguese legislative election was held on 19 July 1987. In the election, the Social Democratic Party (PPD/PSD) won by a landslide with an absolute majority, the first for a single party in democracy.

Party	Assembly of the Republic			
Party	Votes	%	Seats	+/−
PPD/PSD	2,850,784	50.22	148	+60
PS	1,262,506	22.24	60	+3
CDU	689,137	12.14	31	–7
PRD	278,561	4.91	7	–38
CDS	251,987	4.44	5	–18
Other/blank/invalid	343,383	6.05	0	±0
Total	5,676,358	100.00	250	±0

== Composition (1987–1991) ==
Party	Parliamentary group leader	Elected		Dissolution	
Party	Parliamentary group leader	Seats	%	Seats	%
PPD/PSD	António Capucho (Faro) (1987); Fernando Correia Afonso (Lisbon) (1987–1988); Montalvão Machado (Porto) (1988–1991)	148	59.2	148	59.2
PS	Jorge Sampaio (Lisbon) (1987–1988); António Guterres (Castelo Branco) (1988–1991)	60	24.0	67	26.8
PCP	Carlos Brito (Faro)	29	11.6	29	11.6
PRD	Hermínio Martinho (Santarém) (1987–1990)	7	2.8	0	0.0
CDS	Narana Coissoró (Lisbon)	4	1.6	4	1.6
PEV	Maria Amélia Santos (Setúbal) (1987–1989); Herculano Pombo (Lisbon) (1989–1990)	2	0.8	0	0.0
Independent	Herculano Pombo (Lisbon); Valente Fernandes (Setúbal)	0	0.0	2	0.8
Total		250	100.0	250	100.0

=== Changes ===
- On December 1990, the 7 MPs of the Democratic Renewal Party left the party and decided to join the Socialist Party caucus, after a split with the then party leader, Pedro Canavarro.
- Also on December 1990, the two MPs from the Ecologist Party "The Greens", Herculano Pombo and Valente Fernandes, decided to dissolve the party's caucus and sit as Independents, following a rift with the Portuguese Communist Party and defending an ecological party not aligned with the Communists.

== Election for President of the Assembly of the Republic ==
To be elected, a candidate needs to reach a minimum of 126 votes. Vítor Pereira Crespo, from the Social Democratic Party, was the sole candidate and was easily elected:

Election of the President of the Assembly of the Republic
1st Ballot →	25 August 1987	
Required majority →	126 out of 250	
Vítor Pereira Crespo (PPD/PSD)	145 / 250	check
Against	31 / 250	
Blank ballots	1 / 250	
Invalid ballots	0 / 250	
Abstentions	57 / 250	
Absentees	16 / 250	

One year later, on October 1988, a ballot was called to elect, again, the President of the Assembly. Two candidates were on the ballot: Incumbent President Vítor Pereira Crespo, from the Social Democratic Party, and MP António Lopes Cardoso, from the Socialist Party. Vítor Crespo was easily reelected.

Election of the President of the Assembly of the Republic
1st Ballot →	20 October 1988	
Required majority →	126 out of 250	
Vítor Pereira Crespo (PPD/PSD)	132 / 250	check
António Lopes Cardoso (PS)	78 / 250	☒
Blank ballots	19 / 250	
Invalid ballots	1 / 250	
Absentees	20 / 250	
