= Basílio Horta =

Portuguese politician (born 1943)

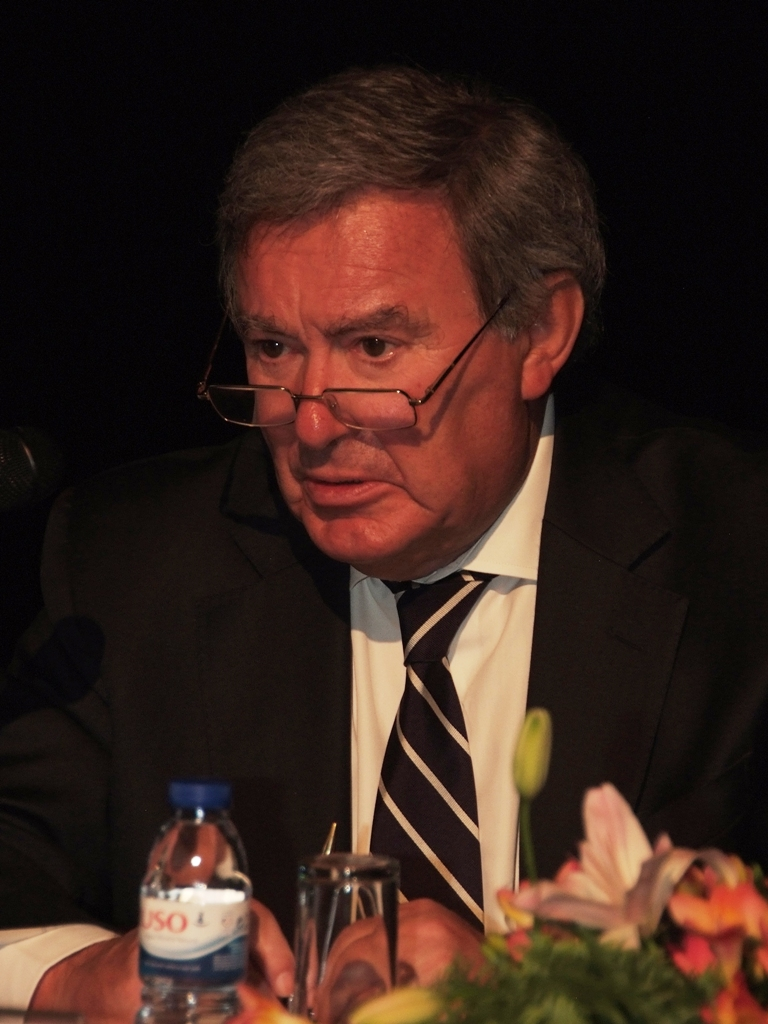
- Basílio Horta in 2010

Mayor of Sintra
- In office 23 October 2013 – 1 November 2025
- Preceded by: Fernando Seara
- Succeeded by: Marco Almeida

Minister of Agriculture, Commerce and Fisheries
- In office 4 September 1981 – 9 June 1983
- Prime Minister: Francisco Pinto Balsemão
- Preceded by: António Cardoso e Cunha
- Succeeded by: Manuel Soares Costa

Minister in the Cabinet of the Prime Minister
- In office 9 January 1981 – 4 September 1981
- Prime Minister: Francisco Pinto Balsemão
- Preceded by: Francisco Pinto Balsemão
- Succeeded by: Fernando Amaral

Minister of Commerce and Tourism
- In office 3 January 1980 – 9 January 1981
- Prime Minister: Francisco Sá Carneiro; Diogo Freitas do Amaral
- Preceded by: Acácio Pereira Magro
- Succeeded by: Alexandre Vaz Pinto
- In office 30 January 1978 – 29 August 1978
- Prime Minister: Mário Soares
- Preceded by: Carlos Mota Pinto
- Succeeded by: Pedro Pires de Miranda

Member of the Assembly of the Republic
- In office 20 June 2011 – 23 October 2013
- Constituency: Leiria
- In office 5 April 2002 – 9 March 2005
- Constituency: Porto
- In office 25 October 1999 – 4 April 2002
- Constituency: Viseu
- In office 1987–1991
- Constituency: Porto
- In office 1976–1983
- Constituency: Braga

Personal details
- Born: Basílio Adolfo de Mendonça Horta da França; 16 November 1943 (age 82) Tábua, Portugal
- Party: PS (since 2009)
- Other political affiliations: UN (1969–1974); CDS–PP (1974–2009)

Basílio Adolfo de Mendonça Horta da França (born 16 November 1943) is a Portuguese jurist and politician and a founder of CDS – People's Party. Currently, he serves as Mayor of Sintra, as a member of the Socialist Party. He was also a candidate in the 1991 presidential election, finishing in second place and losing to Mário Soares.

He held the positions of member of the Assembly of the Republic, Minister of Commerce and Tourism, Minister of Agriculture, Commerce and Fisheries, Member of the Council of State, and Ambassador to the OECD.
