= 6th Legislature of the Third Portuguese Republic =

←	5th Legislature	7th Legislature	→

Overview
- Legislative body: Assembly of the Republic
- Meeting place: Palace of Saint Benedict
- Term: 4 November 1991 – 26 October 1995
- Election: 6 October 1991
- Government: XII Constitutional Government
- Website: parlamento.pt

Deputies
- Members: 230
- President: António Barbosa de Melo (PPD/PSD)
- First Vice-President: Leonor Beleza (PPD/PSD) (1991–1994); Fernando Correia Afonso (PPD/PSD) (1994–1995)
- Second Vice-President: Ferraz de Abreu (PS)
- Third Vice-President: José Manuel Maia (PCP)
- Fourth Vice-President: Adriano Moreira (CDS)

The 6th Legislature of the Third Portuguese Republic (Portuguese: VI Legislatura da Terceira República Portuguesa) ran from 4 November 1991 to 26 October 1995. This legislature saw a reduction in the total number of elected MPs, from 250 to 230, following a constitutional review in 1989. The composition of the Assembly of the Republic, the legislative body of Portugal, was determined by the results of the 1991 legislative election, held on 6 October 1991.

== Election ==
The 7th Portuguese legislative election was held on 6 October 1991. In the election, the Social Democratic Party (PPD/PSD) won for the third consecutive time and renewed the absolute majority achieved four years earlier.

Party	Assembly of the Republic			
Party	Votes	%	Seats	+/−
PPD/PSD	2,902,351	50.60	135	–13
PS	1,670,758	29.13	72	+12
CDU	504,583	8.80	17	–14
CDS	254,317	4.43	5	+1
PSN	96,096	1.68	1	+1
Other/blank/invalid	307,326	5.36	0	–1
Total	5,735,431	100.00	230	–20

== Composition (1991–1995) ==
Party	Parliamentary group leader	Elected		Dissolution	
Party	Parliamentary group leader	Seats	%	Seats	%
PPD/PSD	Montalvão Machado (Lisbon) (1991–1992); Duarte Lima (Bragança) (1992–1995); José Pacheco Pereira (Porto) (1995)	135	58.7	135	58.7
PS	Jaime Gama (Lisbon) (1991–1992); António de Almeida Santos (Porto) (1992–1993); Jaime Gama (Lisbon) (1993–1995)	72	31.3	72	31.3
PCP	Carlos Carvalhas (Lisbon) (1991–1992); Octávio Teixeira (Setúbal) (1992–1995)	15	6.5	14	6.1
CDS	António Lobo Xavier (Porto)	5	2.2	4	1.7
PEV	Isabel Castro (Lisbon)	2	0.9	2	0.9
PSN	Manuel Sérgio (Lisbon)	1	0.4	1	0.4
Independent	Mário Tomé (Lisbon); Diogo Freitas do Amaral (Lisbon)	0	0.0	2	0.8
Total		230	100.0	230	100.0

=== Changes ===
- Mário Tomé, Portuguese Communist Party (PCP) → Independent: A member of the Popular Democratic Union (UDP), he left the PCP caucus at the beginning of the legislature.
- Diogo Freitas do Amaral, Democratic Social Center (CDS) → Independent: Left the CDS parliamentary group, and the party itself, following deep disagreements with the new leader, Manuel Monteiro, elected in 1992.

== Election for President of the Assembly of the Republic ==
To be elected, a candidate needs to reach a minimum of 116 votes. Two ballots were needed to elected a new President. António Barbosa de Melo, from the Social Democratic Party, faced MP Alberto Oliveira e Silva, from the Socialist Party, in both rounds. On the second round, Barbosa de Melo was elected by a narrow majority:

Election of the President of the Assembly of the Republic
1st Ballot →	7 November 1991	
Required majority →	116 out of 230	
António Barbosa de Melo (PPD/PSD)	109 / 230	☒
Alberto Oliveira e Silva (PS)	71 / 230	☒
Blank ballots	25 / 230	
Invalid ballots	14 / 230	
Absentees	11 / 230	

Election of the President of the Assembly of the Republic
2nd Ballot →	7 November 1991	
Required majority →	116 out of 230	
António Barbosa de Melo (PPD/PSD)	117 / 230	check
Alberto Oliveira e Silva (PS)	62 / 230	☒
Blank ballots	31 / 230	
Invalid ballots	0 / 230	
Absentees	20 / 230	
