= Joaquim Magalhães Mota =

Portuguese lawyer and politician

Joaquim Jorge de Magalhães Saraiva da Mota (November 17, 1935 in Santarém, São Salvador – September 26, 2007 in Lisbon) was a Portuguese lawyer and politician.

== Background ==
He was a son of Elói do Nascimento Saraiva da Mota (July 2, 1907 in Lisbon, São Vicente de Fora – February 11, 2000 in Lisbon) and wife (January 19, 1935) Miquelina Augusta Flor de Magalhães (b. Guarda, Sé, March 14, 1914).

== Career ==
He was a licentiate in Law from the Faculty of Law of the University of Lisbon.

He started his career as a lawyer.

He was a Member of the Liberal Wing (Ala Liberal), at the dictatorial National Assembly, during Marcelo Caetano's government, that came to an end in 1974. After the 25 April 1974, he was one of the four Co-Founders of the Popular Democratic Party (Partido Popular Democrático), with Francisco de Sá Carneiro, Francisco Pinto Balsemão, Carlos Mota Pinto, João Bosco Mota Amaral, Alberto João Jardim, António Barbosa de Melo and António Marques Mendes. The party later changed its name to Social Democratic Party. He was Minister of Internal Affairs, in the I Provisional Government, led by Adelino da Palma Carlos, from May 15 to July 17, 1974. He also became a Deputy at the Portuguese Assembly of the Republic. From 1976 to 1978 was the Secretary-General of PSD. He later left the party and was a member of the Independent Social Democratic Action and the Democratic Renovator Party.

== Family ==
He married at the Church of Santa Maria at Santa Maria, Sintra, on February 26, 1962 to Maria Manuela de Almeida Martins da Silva, born in Lisbon, São Sebastião da Pedreira, October 18, 1936, representative of the titles of Viscountess of Monção and Lady of São João de Rei, and had four children:

- Helena da Silva de Magalhães Mota (b. Lisbon, São João de Deus, March 30, 1963), married at the Church of São Tomás de Aquino, at Encarnação, Lisbon, on October 8, 1988 to João Manuel Oliveira Barreto, and had two children:
  - Gonçalo de Magalhães Mota Oliveira Barreto (b. Lisbon, July 2, 1990)
  - Tomás de Magalhães Mota Oliveira Barreto (b. Lisbon, March 1, 1993)
- Inês da Silva de Magalhães Mota (b. Lisbon, São João de Deus, February 20, 1965), unmarried and without issue
- Pedro da Silva de Magalhães Mota (b. Lisbon, Alvalade, December 28, 1969), a lawyer, married at the Church of Nossa Senhora do Rosário at São Domingos de Benfica, Lisbon, on May 28, 1995 to Luísa Maria Marques de Freitas de Aguiar (b. Lisbon, São Sebastião da Pedreira, December 18, 1966), and has three children:
  - André de Aguiar de Magalhães Mota (b. Lisbon, Santa Maria dos Olivais, December 5, 1996)
  - Diogo de Aguiar de Magalhães Mota (b. Lisbon, Santa Maria dos Olivais, May 29, 1998)
  - Tiago de Aguiar de Magalhães Mota (b. Lisbon, São Domingos de Benfica, February 3, 2000)
- João da Silva de Magalhães Mota (b. Lisbon, São Domingos de Benfica, October 25, 1976), unmarried and without issue

== See also ==
- Politics of Portugal
