= Brazilian Civil Service =

Public administration workforce of Brazil

The Brazilian Penal Code defines an official or civil servant as follows: "Article 327 - ... those who, although temporarily or without pay, hold a position, employment or public usefulness. § 1 - Equivalent to a public official who holds a position, job or function in parastatal entity, and who works for the company providing the service or the private contractor for the execution of activity typical of public administration."

== Legal Regime of Civil Servants ==
Originally, the Constitution of Brazil had established a single legal regime that would apply to Federal entities for all hires. Subsequently, Constitutional Amendment number 19 relaxed this requirement by establishing the possibility of adopting the statutory regime or Hired Under Employment Laws, but was reinstated after the foregoing assessment of ADIn 2135. The regulation of the legal regime of civil servants federal government, local and federal public foundations is carried out in Brazil under Federal Law no. 8.112/1990. Are not included in the legal regime established by this Act that federal employees are governed by the dictates of the Consolidation of Labor Laws and Federal Law no. 9.962/2000. It should be understood that under the Federal Constitution of 1988, both regimes must respect constitutionally established rules, for example, all accepted by the public employer shall be subject to a tender or selection process.

Thus, in Brazil so-called statutory servants (connected to the system of Federal Law no. 8112) and servants called celetistas, which obey the Consolidation of Labor Laws. However, in order to grant interim with ex nunc effect on the date of August 2, 2007 ADIn in 2135, which suspended the effectiveness of EC 19 in that it modifies the chapeau of Article 39 for violation of the CF/1988 Article 60, II, of CF/1988 (vice-initiative), the Legal One has been restored.

== Tenure ==
The term civil servant and tenured servant appear in the Constitution of Brazil. Article 41 of the Federal Constitution states that "Servants who, by virtue of public entrance examinations, are appointed to effective posts, acquire tenure after three years of actual service."

Civil servants are listed as a category of public servants: they are permanent staff, professionals in the service of public administration. The Brazilian Penal Code, however, refers to a public official, which has a broader scope than the public servant. A board member, for example, who exercises a public function (help in the electoral process), is a civilian employee (in respect of acts performed as a board member), despite a transient and unpaid public role.

== Entrance ==
Filling is the administrative act of filling public office in Brazil regulated by Law No. 8112 of November 11, 1990 [1]. Under the legislation, the provision may be given by appointment, promotion, rehabilitation, recovery, reintegration and renewal. Each of these forms of provision has a special significance in public administration and specify the legal form of access to public office in Brazil.

== Compensation ==
The fee payment for services rendered to the state civil servant is given as follows:

- I Maturity: the cash consideration for the exercise of public office, with the rate fixed by law;
- II Remuneration: Salary is the effective position, plus the permanent pecuniary advantages determined by law;
- III Grant: is the exclusive and fixed fee payment in a lump sum, sealed the addition of any bonus, extra, bonus, award, grant or other type of representation remuneration. This type of pay is not the general rule and applies to cases that the law specify;

Earning.

- IV: the return of money paid to exercente of public office when going from activity to inactivity, or when he retires;
- V board: cash is retribution paid to the persons to whom the law attributes the condition of receiving the public servant who died.

CF/88 Article 39 § 4: The State of Power, the holder of an elective office, Ministers of State and Municipal and State Secretaries shall be paid exclusively by fixed allowance in a lump sum, sealed the addition of any bonus, additional allowance, award, grant or other type of representation remuneration, obeyed in any case the provisions of art. 37, X and X Any salary within the public service may exceed the value of allowances paid to Justices of the Supreme Court (STF) and the salaries of the offices of the Legislative and the Judiciary can not be higher than those paid by the executive. Despite these rules exist, many people are wondering if they are indeed obeyed.

== See also ==
- Academic ranks in Brazil
- Concurso público
- Public servant § Brazil
