= Emídio Guerreiro =

Portuguese politician (1899–2005)

Secretary-General of the People's Democratic Party
- In office 25 May 1975 – 28 September 1975
- Preceded by: Francisco Sá Carneiro
- Succeeded by: Francisco Sá Carneiro

Member of the Constituent Assembly
- In office 2 June 1975 – 2 April 1976
- Constituency: Porto

Personal details
- Born: Emídio Guerreiro; 6 September 1899 Guimarães, Portugal
- Died: 29 June 2005 (aged 105) Guimarães, Portugal
- Party: People's Democratic (1974–1976); Democratic Renewal (1985–1987)
- Occupation: Politician
- Profession: Mathematician

Emídio Guerreiro (6 September 1899 – 29 June 2005) was a Portuguese mathematician and politician, who was the Secretary-general of the People's Democratic Party (future Social Democratic Party) from May until September 1975, replacing Francisco Sá Carneiro due to health reasons.

== Biography ==
Guerreiro was born in Guimarães, in a Republican family. He fought in World War I, after which he studied Math in the University of Porto.

Following the 28 May 1926 coup, he fought against the dictatorship, being part of an attempted coup. He ended up going into exile in Spain in 1932, where he ended up fighting in the Civil War on the side of the Republicans. After Francisco Franco's victory, he went to France, where, after the German Invasion, he joined the French Resistance.

He was a supporter of General Humberto Delgado's 1958 presidential bid. After Delgado's assassination he proposed himself to be the new leader of the Portuguese democratic opposition, but that was refused by Mário Soares. Afterwards he was a founding member of the Unity and Revolutionary Action League (LUAR), along with Hermínio Palma Inácio, Camilo Mortágua and Fernando Pereira Marques.

After the Carnation Revolution, he returned to Portugal, joining the People's Democratic Party. Guerreiro was elected in 1975 as a Member of the Constituent Assembly. He left the PPD in 1976 after ideological disagreements.

Guerreiro later joined the Democratic Renewal Party in 1985 and, after the party lost their relevance, became close to the Socialist Party. Despite that, he endorsed Pedro Santana Lopes in the 2001 Lisbon local election.

He died in 2005, at 105 years old.
