= 7th Legislature of the Third Portuguese Republic =

←	6th Legislature	8th Legislature	→

Overview
- Legislative body: Assembly of the Republic
- Meeting place: Palace of Saint Benedict
- Term: 27 October 1995 – 24 October 1999
- Election: 1 October 1995
- Government: XIII Constitutional Government
- Website: parlamento.pt

Deputies
- Members: 230
- President: António de Almeida Santos (PS)
- First Vice-President: Manuel Alegre (PS)
- Second Vice-President: João Bosco Mota Amaral (PPD/PSD)
- Third Vice-President: Vacant (1995–1998); Nuno Krus Abecasis (CDS–PP) (1998–1999); Pedro Feist (CDS–PP) (1999)
- Fourth Vice-President: João Amaral (PCP)

The 7th Legislature of the Third Portuguese Republic (Portuguese: VII Legislatura da Terceira República Portuguesa) ran from 27 October 1995 to 24 October 1999. The composition of the Assembly of the Republic, the legislative body of Portugal, was determined by the results of the 1995 legislative election, held on 1 October 1995.

== Election ==
The 8th Portuguese legislative election was held on 1 October 1995. In the election, the Socialist Party (PS) won the election, despite not winning a majority.

Party	Assembly of the Republic			
Party	Votes	%	Seats	+/−
PS	2,583,755	43.76	112	+40
PPD/PSD	2,014,589	34.12	88	–47
CDS–PP	534,470	9.05	15	+10
CDU	506,157	8.57	15	–2
Other/blank/invalid	265,883	4.50	0	–1
Total	5,904,854	100.00	230	±0

== Composition (1995–1999) ==
Party	Parliamentary group leader	Elected	
Party	Parliamentary group leader	Seats	%
PS	Jorge Lacão (Santarém) (1995–1997); Francisco Assis (Porto) (1997–1999)	112	48.7
PPD/PSD	Fernando Nogueira (Porto) (1995–1996); Luís Marques Mendes (Braga) (1996–1999)	88	38.3
CDS–PP	Maria José Nogueira Pinto (Lisbon) (1995–1996); Jorge Ferreira (Lisbon) (1996–1998); Luís Queiró (Lisbon) (1998–1999)	15	6.5
PCP	Octávio Teixeira (Setúbal) (1999–2001)	13	5.6
PEV	Isabel Castro (Lisbon)	2	0.9
Total		230	100.0

== Election for President of the Assembly of the Republic ==
To be elected, a candidate needs to reach a minimum of 116 votes. António de Almeida Santos, from the Socialist Party, was easily elected:

Election of the President of the Assembly of the Republic
Ballot →	31 October 1995	
Required majority →	116 out of 230	
António de Almeida Santos (PS)	164 / 230	check
Blank ballots	53 / 230	
Invalid ballots	3 / 230	
Absentees	10 / 230	
