= 9th Legislature of the Third Portuguese Republic =

←	8th Legislature	10th Legislature	→

Overview
- Legislative body: Assembly of the Republic
- Meeting place: Palace of Saint Benedict
- Term: 5 April 2002 – 9 March 2005
- Election: 17 March 2002
- Government: XV Constitutional Government; XVI Constitutional Government
- Website: parlamento.pt

Deputies
- Members: 230
- President: João Bosco Mota Amaral (PPD/PSD)
- First Vice-President: Leonor Beleza (PPD/PSD)
- Second Vice-President: Manuel Alegre (PS)
- Third Vice-President: Narana Coissoró (CDS–PP)
- Fourth Vice-President: António Filipe (PCP)

The 9th Legislature of the Third Portuguese Republic (Portuguese: IX Legislatura da Terceira República Portuguesa) ran from 5 April 2002 to 9 March 2005. The composition of the Assembly of the Republic, the legislative body of Portugal, was determined by the results of the 2002 legislative election, held on 17 March 2002.

President Jorge Sampaio dissolved Parliament and dismissed the government, then led by Pedro Santana Lopes, following a lack of trust in the government's capacity to govern. The Assembly was officially dissolved on 22 December 2004 and an election called for 20 February 2005.

== Election ==
The 10th Portuguese legislative election was held on 17 March 2002. In the election, the Social Democratic Party (PPD/PSD) won without a majority, governing with the CDS – People's Party (CDS–PP).

Party	Assembly of the Republic			
Party	Votes	%	Seats	+/−
PPD/PSD	2,200,765	40.21	105	+24
PS	2,068,584	37.79	96	–19
CDS–PP	477,350	8.72	14	–1
CDU	379,870	6.94	12	–5
BE	153,877	2.81	3	+1
Other/blank/invalid	192,405	3.52	0	±0
Total	5,473,655	100.00	230	±0

== Composition (2002–2005) ==
Party	Parliamentary group leader	Elected	
Party	Parliamentary group leader	Seats	%
PPD/PSD	Guilherme Silva (Madeira)	105	45.7
PS	António Costa (Leiria) (2002–2004); António José Seguro (Lisbon) (2004–2005)	96	41.7
CDS–PP	Telmo Correia (Lisbon) (2002–2004); Nuno Melo (Braga) (2004–2005)	14	6.1
PCP	Bernardino Soares (Lisbon)	10	4.3
BE	Luís Fazenda (Lisbon)	3	1.3
PEV	Isabel Castro (Lisbon) (2002–2004); Heloísa Apolónia (Setúbal) (2004–2005)	2	0.9
Total		230	100.0

== Election for President of the Assembly of the Republic ==
To be elected, a candidate needs to reach a minimum of 116 votes. João Bosco Mota Amaral, from the Social Democratic Party, was easily elected:

Election of the President of the Assembly of the Republic
Ballot →	9 April 2002	
Required majority →	116 out of 230	
João Bosco Mota Amaral (PPD/PSD)	163 / 230	check
Blank ballots	55 / 230	
Invalid ballots	9 / 230	
Absentees	3 / 230	
