= Francisco Pinto Balsemão =

Prime Minister of Portugal from 1981 to 1983

His Excellency Francisco Pinto Balsemão GCC GCIH GCL GO
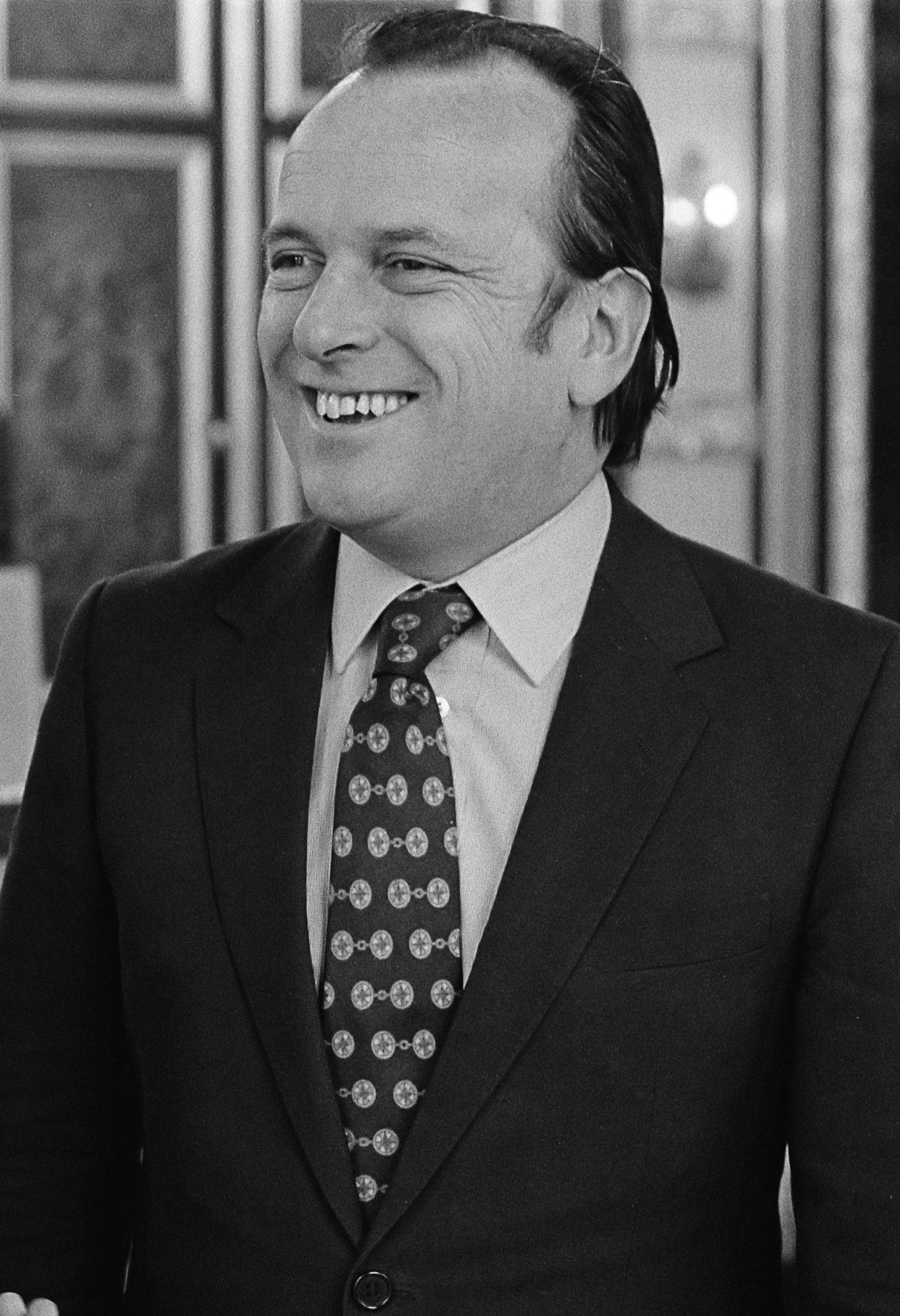
- Balsemão in 1982

Prime Minister of Portugal
- In office 9 January 1981 – 9 June 1983
- President: António Ramalho Eanes
- Deputy: Diogo Freitas do Amaral
- Preceded by: Francisco Sá Carneiro
- Succeeded by: Mário Soares

President of the Social Democratic Party
- In office 13 December 1980 – 27 February 1983
- Secretary‑General: António Capucho
- Preceded by: Francisco Sá Carneiro
- Succeeded by: Nuno Rodrigues dos Santos

Minister in the Cabinet of the Prime Minister
- In office 3 January 1980 – 9 January 1981
- Prime Minister: Francisco Sá Carneiro
- Preceded by: Manuel da Costa Brás
- Succeeded by: Basílio Horta

Member of the Assembly of the Republic
- In office 4 November 1985 – 12 August 1987
- Constituency: Lisbon
- In office 3 June 1976 – 12 November 1980
- Constituency: Porto
- In office 2 June 1975 – 2 April 1976
- Constituency: Lisbon

Personal details
- Born: 1 September 1937 Lisbon, Lisbon District, Portugal
- Died: 21 October 2025 (aged 88) Cascais, Lisbon District, Portugal
- Party: Social Democratic Party
- Spouses: Maria Isabel de Lacerda Rebelo Pinto da Costa Lobo (m. 1964, divorced) Maria Mercedes Aliu Presas (m. 1975)
- Children: 5
- Relatives: Pedro IV of Portugal (great-great-grandfather)
- Education: University of Lisbon
- Occupation: Politician; journalist; newspaper administrator
- Known for: Founder of Impresa

Francisco José Pereira Pinto Balsemão (Portuguese pronunciation: [fɾɐ̃ˈsiʃku ˈpĩtu βalsɨˈmɐ̃w]; 1 September 1937 – 21 October 2025) was a Portuguese businessman, journalist, and politician, who served as Prime Minister of Portugal from 1981 to 1983.

Under the Estado Novo regime, Pinto Balsemão served in the National Assembly as part of the pro-democracy "Liberal Wing". In 1974, shortly after the Carnation Revolution, Pinto Balsemão co-founded the Social Democratic Party along with like-minded politicians Francisco Sá Carneiro and Joaquim Magalhães Mota.

During the Portuguese transition to democracy, Pinto Balsemão served in the Constituent Assembly, which was tasked with drafting a new constitution. Under prime minister Sá Carneiro, Pinto Balsemão served as a cabinet minister. After Sá Carneiro died in 1980, Pinto Balsemão succeeded him as prime minister in 1981, although political tension led him to leave office in 1983.

In addition to holding political office, Pinto Balsemão led the Impresa media group, founding the Expresso newspaper in 1973 and the SIC television network in 1992.

== Background ==
Francisco Pinto Balsemão was born in Lisbon on 1 September 1937, the son of Henrique Patrício Pinto Balsemão and wife Maria Adelaide van Zeller de Castro Pereira, great-granddaughter of Pedro IV of Portugal.

== Career ==
Having earned a law degree from the University of Lisbon in 1960, Pinto Balsemão's pre-political career was in newspaper publishing. After working as a journalist and then as an administrator of Diário Popular (the People's Daily in English) from 1963 to 1971, he founded the Expresso magazine in 1973. He was also the founder of Impresa media group.

Pinto Balsemão was a member of the National Assembly from 1969 to 1973, under the Estado Novo regime. Along with Francisco Sá Carneiro, Joaquim Magalhães Mota, João Bosco Mota Amaral and others, he was a member of the "Liberal Wing", an unorganized group of politicians in favor of democratization. During his tenure in the National Assembly, he advocated against censorship and visited political prisoners. Pinto Balsemão resigned from the National Assembly in 1973 following the departure of Francisco Sá Carneiro.

In 1974, shortly after the Carnation Revolution, Pinto Balsemão, together with Sá Carneiro and Magalhães Mota, helped to found the Social Democratic Party (PSD), of which he was member number 1. In 1975 he was elected to the Constituent Assembly, which was charged with drafting a new constitution and served as an interim legislature. Pinto Balsemão was chosen as a vice-president of this body.

Following the victory of the Democratic Alliance (a coalition led by the PSD) in the 1979 and 1980 parliamentary elections, Pinto Balsemão was a cabinet minister under Prime Minister Francisco Sá Carneiro.

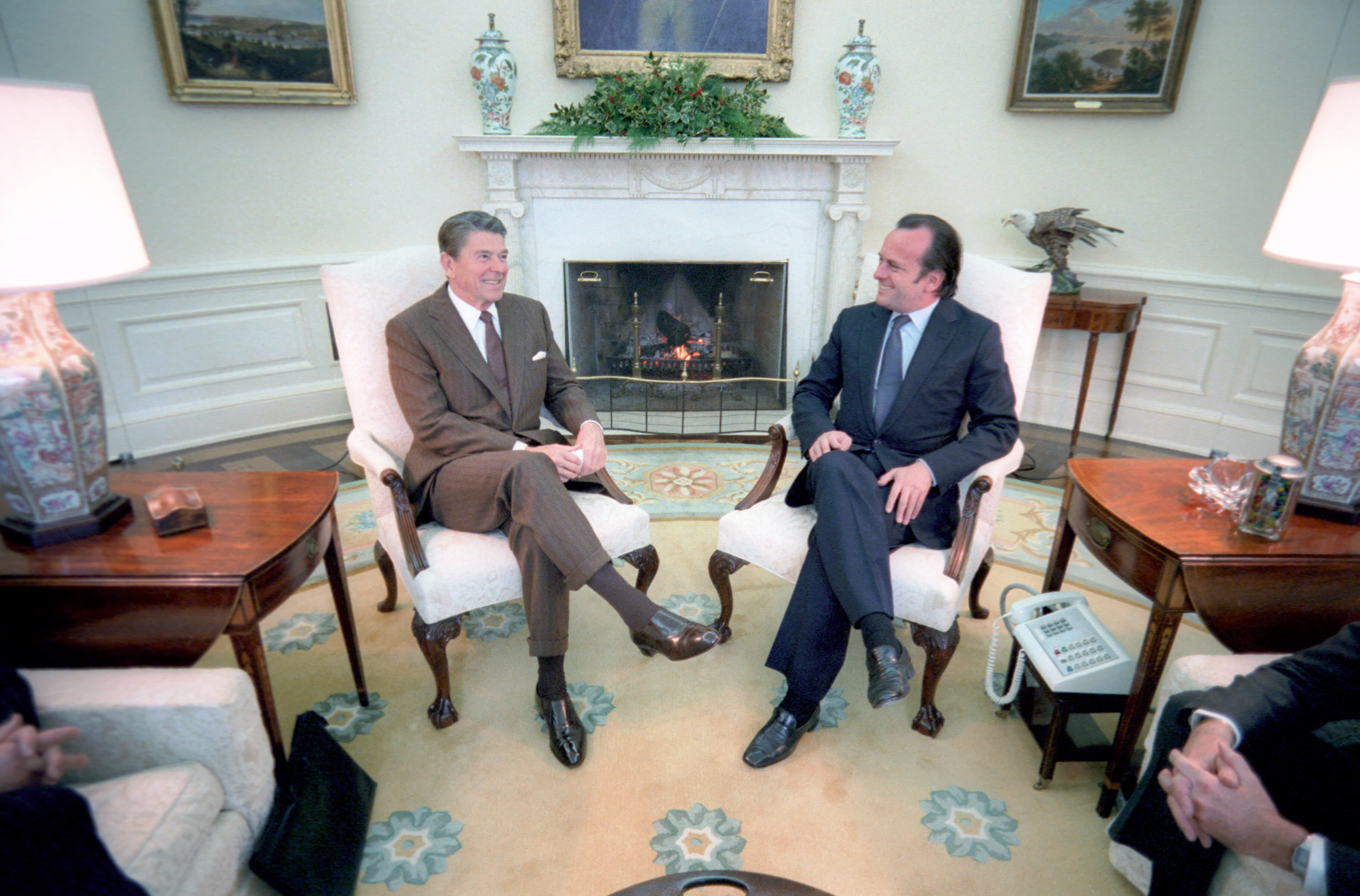
Pinto Balsemão with Ronald Reagan in an Oval Office meeting, 1982

After Sá Carneiro was killed in an air accident on 4 December 1980, the Social Democratic Party chose Pinto Balsemão to succeed him as prime minister. He took office on 9 January 1981.

He had to cope with criticism within his own party, tension within the ruling coalition, and attacks from opposition parties. These factors contributed to his resignation in December 1982, though he remained the head of a caretaker government, leaving office on 9 June 1983. He had served as president of the Social Democratic Party from 13 December 1980 to 27 February 1983.

After his political career, Pinto Balsemão returned to the Impresa group. In 1992, he founded Sociedade Independente de Comunicação (SIC), the first Portuguese private television network. He served as chairman of the European Publishers Council and led the European Institute for the Media.

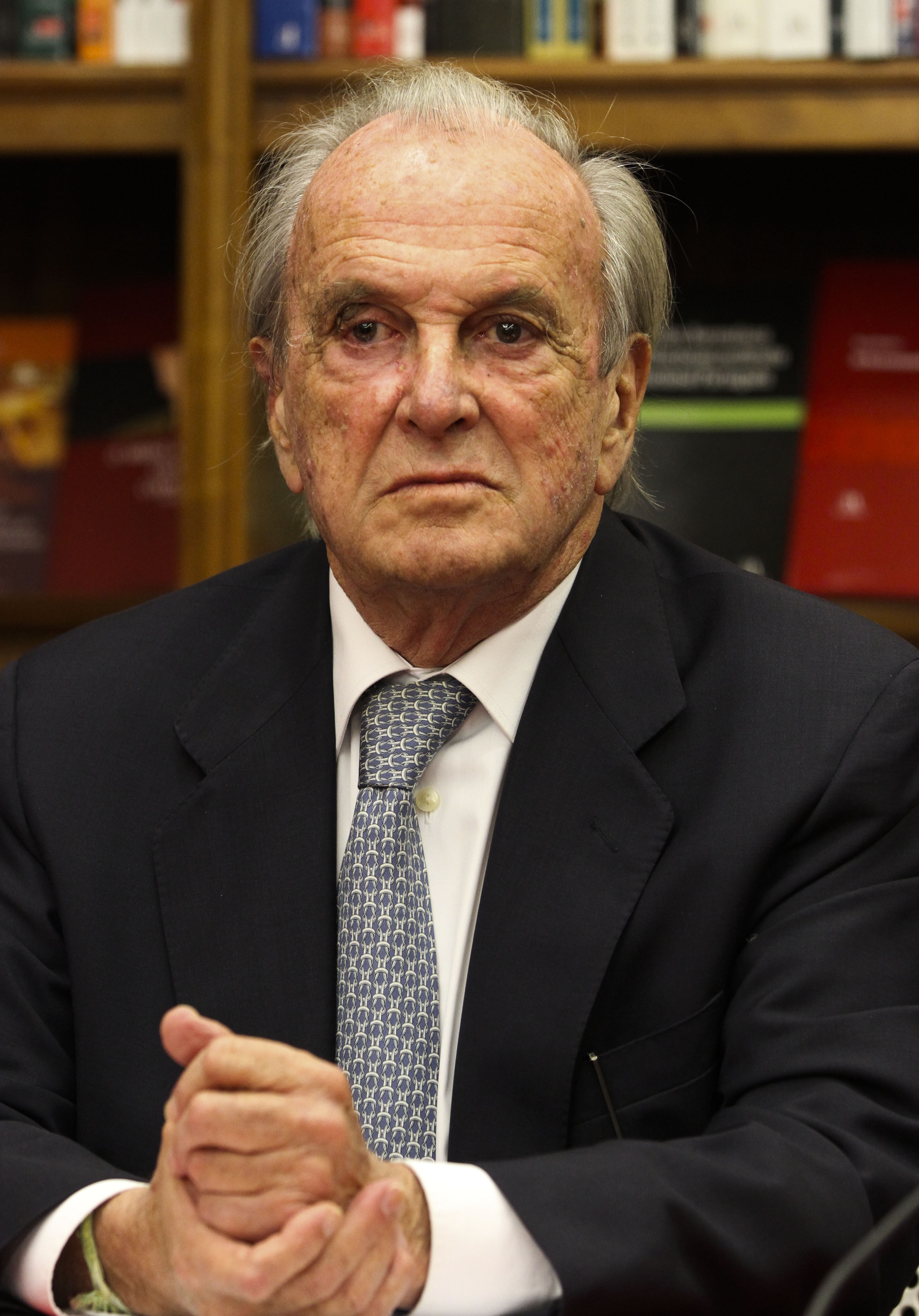
Pinto Balsemão in 2012

Pinto Balsemão was a member of Steering Committee of the Bilderberg Group for over thirty years. From 2005, he was also a member of the Portuguese Council of State.

== Personal life ==
In 1964, Pinto Balsemão married Maria Isabel de Lacerda Rebelo Pinto da Costa Lobo, also known as "Belicha". The couple had two children, Mónica and Henrique.

His third child, Francisco Maria, was born in 1970, the product of an extramarital relationship with Isabel Maria Supico Pinto. Pinto Balsemão initially refused to recognize paternity of his illegitimate child and the two did not meet until the late 1980s. His wife, Belicha, also allegedly had an extramarital affair with television presenter Carlos Cruz, which was later confirmed in Cruz's autobiography.

Pinto Balsemão's second marriage was to Maria Mercedes Aliu Presas, also known as "Tita", of Spanish descent. They were married in 1975, after Pinto Balsemão's divorce with his first wife was finalized. The couple had two children, Joana and Francisco Pedro. Pinto Balsemão referred to his second wife as the "queen mother" due to her personal influence. She welcomed and integrated Francisco Maria into the family.

Pinto Balsemão died at his home in Cascais on 21 October 2025, at the age of 88.

== Honours ==
=== National ===
- Grand Cross of the Order of Christ (GCC, 8 June 1983)
- Grand Cross of the Order of Prince Henry (GCIH, 5 January 2006)
- Grand Cross of the Order of Liberty (GCL, 25 April 2011)
- Grand Cross of the Order of Camões (GCCa, 10 March 2025)
- Grand Officer of the Order Merit (GOM, 17 October 1983)

=== Foreign ===
- Belgium: Grand Cross of the Order of the Crown (23 November 1981)
- Brazil: Grand Cross of the National Order of the Southern Cross (25 November 1981)
- Greece: Grand Cross of the Order of Merit (8 September 1982)
- Hungary: Grand Cross Order of the Flag of the Republic of Hungary (26 November 1982)
- Italy: Knight Grand Cross of the Order of Merit of the Italian Republic (2 December 1982)
- Holy See: Knight Grand Cross of the Order of Pope Pius IX (15 March 1983)
- Spain: Grand Cross of the Order of Isabella the Catholic (20 March 1989)
- Yugoslavia: Grand Cross of the Order of the Yugoslav Flag (8 June 1983)

Political offices
Preceded by Manuel da Costa Brás	Minister in the Cabinet of the Prime Minister; 1980–1981	Succeeded by Basílio Horta
Preceded by João Morais Leitão	Minister of Social Affairs; 1981	Succeeded by Carlos Macedo
Preceded by Francisco Sá Carneiro	Prime Minister of Portugal; 1981–1983	Succeeded by Mário Soares
Party political offices
Preceded by Francisco Sá Carneiro	President of the Social Democratic Party; 1980–1983	Succeeded by Nuno Rodrigues dos Santos
