= Narana Coissoró =

Portuguese lawyer and politician (1931–2026)

Narana Coissoró GCIP GOC GCIH
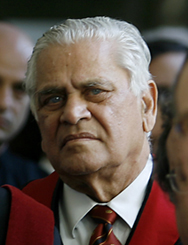
- Coissoró in 2009

Vice President of the Assembly of the Republic
- In office 25 October 1999 – 9 March 2005
- President: António de Almeida Santos; João Bosco Mota Amaral

Member of the Assembly of the Republic
- In office 5 April 2002 – 9 March 2005
- Constituency: Setúbal
- In office 25 October 1999 – 4 April 2002
- Constituency: Lisbon
- In office 3 June 1976 – 26 October 1995
- Constituency: Lisbon

Personal details
- Born: Narana Sinai Coissoró; 3 October 1931 Goa, Portuguese India
- Died: 29 August 2026 (aged 94) Lisbon, Portugal
- Party: CDS – People's Party
- Spouse: Teresa da Costa Brandão
- Children: 1
- Education: University of Coimbra; University of London
- Occupation: Politician
- Profession: Lawyer; academic

Narana Sinai Coissoró GCIP GOC GCIH (3 October 1931 – 29 August 2026) was a Portuguese lawyer, academic and politician of the CDS – People's Party.

Born in Goa in Portuguese India, he moved to Portugal at the age of 18 to study law at the University of Coimbra. He sat in the Assembly of the Republic for eight legislatures, led his party's parliamentary group for thirteen years between 1978 and 1991, and served as Vice-President of the Assembly from 1999 to 2005. A retired professor of the Instituto Superior de Ciências Sociais e Políticas (ISCSP), he presided over its Institute of the Orient from its foundation in 1989 until 2018.

== Early life and education ==
Coissoró was born in Goa, then part of Portuguese India, on 3 October 1931. He came to Portugal at 18, intending to study law and practise as a lawyer. He took a law degree at the Faculty of Law of the University of Coimbra and a doctorate from the University of London.

== Academic career ==
Coissoró practised law and was a retired professor of the Instituto Superior de Ciências Sociais e Políticas (ISCSP – Higher Institute of Social and Political Sciences), at the time part of the Technical University of Lisbon. He presided over the school's Institute of the Orient (Instituto do Oriente), a research unit devoted to Asian studies, from it’s creation in 1989 until 2018. He also taught at the Universidade Internacional, the Lusófona University and the Catholic University of Portugal.

In April 2018 the ISCSP and the Institute of the Orient held a ceremony in his honour, granting him the title of honorary president of the institute and the school's Medal of Merit, and naming its documentation centre after him.

Coissoró wrote several books, mostly on overseas and customary law, and was a member of the International Academy of Portuguese Culture.

== Political career ==
A long-standing member of the Democratic and Social Centre, Coissoró was first elected to the Assembly of the Republic in June 1976. He sat in the 1st, 2nd, 3rd, 4th, 5th and 6th legislatures and later in the 8th and 9th, missing only the legislature that followed the 1995 election. He was returned for the Lisbon constituency throughout, except in the 9th legislature, when he was elected for Setúbal.

Coissoró led the |CDS parliamentary group for thirteen years, from 1978 to 1991, and was Vice-President of the Assembly of the Republic from 1999 to 2005.

== Other activities ==
Coissoró headed the Casa de Goa, the association of the Goan community in Lisbon, until 2014, when he was succeeded by Edgar Valles.

== Personal life and death ==
Coissoró was married to Teresa da Costa Brandão, born at Caldas da Rainha, with whom he had a daughter. He lived for many years at Nadadouro, in the municipality of Caldas da Rainha. A Hindu, he described himself as a Hindu Christian Democrat.

Coissoró died on 29 August 2026, aged 94, in Lisbon, Portugal. His death was announced by the CDS – People's Party, which issued a statement recalling his service to public life, to university teaching, to the law and to the party, and offering condolences to his family. The party praised the rigour of his thinking and the firmness of his convictions, and linked his career to the establishment of Christian democracy in Portugal.

== Honours ==
=== National honours ===
- Grand Officer of the Military Order of Christ (9 June 1995)
- Grand Cross of the Order of Prince Henry (30 January 2006)
- Grand Cross of the Order of Public Instruction (3 October 2021)
- Grand Officer of the Order of Public Instruction (9 June 1993)

The 2021 Grand Cross was presented at a lunch held for his 90th birthday at the Casa de Goa in Lisbon, by the former CDS leader José Ribeiro e Castro, acting on a warrant signed by President Marcelo Rebelo de Sousa.

== Selected works ==
- Alguns aspectos da paisagem goesa (1955)
- O regime das terras em Moçambique (1964)
- As instituições de direito costumeiro negro-africano (1964)
- Os princípios fundamentais do direito ultramarino português (1966)
- História de um escândalo político (2008)
