= Artur Maurício =

Artur Maurício (died 12 April 2008) was the Portuguese judge who served as the President of the Portuguese Constitutional Court from 2004 until April 2007. He died on 12 April 2008 of a long illness at the age of 63. His funeral was held at the Basílica da Estrela in Lisbon.
