= Fernando Amaral =

Portuguese politician

Fernando Monteiro do Amaral, GCC (Cambres, Lamego, 13 January 1925 – Lamego, 26 January 2009), was a Portuguese politician and parliamentary.

== Career ==
He graduated as a Licentiate in Law from the Faculty of Law of the University of Lisbon.

He was a Vereador of the Municipal Chamber and President of the City Council of Lamego and Purveyor of the Santa Casa da Misericórdia of Lisbon.

He was a Deputy to the Constituent Assembly and to the Assembly of the Republic at the 1st, 3rd, 4th, 5th and 6th Legislatures for the Social Democratic Party, held the office of Minister of Internal Administration in the 7th Constitutional Government and later became Adjoint Minister to the Prime Minister of Portugal Francisco Pinto Balsemão in the 8th.

He was elected the Vice-President of the Assembly of the Republic from 8 June 1983 to 24 October 1984, and the 7th President of the Assembly of the Republic from 25 October 1984 to 12 August 1987. He was also designated a Member of the Portuguese Council of State as the President of the Assembly of the Republic during the same period.

From 1987 to 1989 he was a Deputy to the Parliamentary Assembly of the Council of Europe, of which he also became Vice-President.

== Decorations ==
He was decorated with the Grand Cross of the Order of Christ.
