= Academic ranks (Portugal and Brazil) =

Academic ranks in Portugal and Brazil are the titles, relative importance and power of professors, researchers, and administrative personnel held in academia.

As subtypes of professors the following are distinguished:

- Professor catedrático (Portugal) or Professor titular (Brazil): full professor; it is the highest faculty position
- Professor associado, professor adjunto, professor auxiliar: various intermediary professorship levels, roughly equivalent to associate professor or assistant professor – not to be confounded with adjunct professors –, depending on country and if it's a state or federal university; see country-specific sections below for details
- Professor substituto: a short-term contract for replacement of professors on maternity leave, sabbatical years or other temporary situations (e.g., postdoctoral license)
- Professor visitante: same as visiting professor; usually conducts research as an obligation from his/her contract and so is required to hold a PhD.

== Etymology ==
In Romance languages (spoken in Portugal, France, Italy, Romania and Spanish- and Portuguese-speaking Latin America – Ibero-America), the term "professor" and "teacher" translate the same ("professor" / "professeur" / "professore" / "profesor") thus it is used for anyone teaching at a school (grade/elementary, middle, and high school), institute, technical school, vocational school, college or university, regardless of the level of the subject matter taught or the level or ages of students. However, one who teaches at a university is specifically called "professor universitário" ("university professor"), although it is also common to call university professors just "professor".

== Portugal ==
The Portuguese academic career can be taken by two ways: Teaching Career or Scientific Research Career.

Teaching Career:

- Professor catedrático: equivalent to full professor
- Professor associado: equivalent to associate professor
- Professor auxiliar: equivalent to assistant professor

Both professor associado and professor auxiliar may have Agregação, an extra degree mandatory to all applicants to the rank of professor catedrático which one can apply to usually years after the PhD (similar to the French Habilitation à Diriger des Recherches). Agregação is a two-day exam based on curriculum vitae evaluation and a public lecture, where the candidate is evaluated by secret vote by a large number of other full professors, in which the professors insert a white or a black sphere into a bag according to his or her decision.

The three ranks of professors may also be held by invited professors, according to the rank, this does not mean that they are from outside the university but rather they re not employed by the university full time.

Portuguese universities still have a few other teaching staff in two ranks not holding a PhD. These two ranks were extinguished in 2009 and will vanish after all the ongoing contracts terminate in the next few years.

- Assistente: equivalent to assistant lecturer (without a PhD), normally someone who is simultaneously earning a PhD and holding a master's degree; only teaches practical (or lab) classes.
- Assistente estagiário: equivalent to a junior teaching assistant. It used to be the start of the teaching career until 2009 and already extremely rare to find since the Bologna agreement. They are typically graduate students and only teach practical (lab) classes.

== Brazil ==
=== Federal level ===
Academic ranks in the federal universities have been updated slightly over the years via new legislation. Making direct equivalences between academic ranks in different contexts can be challenging due to variations in educational systems, requirements, and responsibilities. In Brazil, since 2013, ranks are organized in five classes, containing up to four levels each.

- Class E, Professor titular (single level): equivalent to full professor
- Class D, Professor associado (levels 1, 2, 3, 4): must hold a PhD, equivalent to associate professor
- Class C, Professor adjunto (levels 1, 2, 3, 4): must hold a PhD, it might be equivalent to assistant professor. But in practical terms it is closer to associate professor, especially because it requires higher academic levels and is not a temporary position (e.g., unlike adjunct professor in the North American system)
- Class B, Professor assistente (levels 1 and 2): must hold a master's degree
- Class A (levels 1 and 2): pre-tenure faculty
  - Professor adjunto A: must hold a PhD
  - Professor assistente A: must hold a master's degree
  - Professor auxiliar: must hold an undergraduate degree or specialization title

Federal university professors are public servants and as such acquire tenure automatically after an initial three-year probationary period (Portuguese: estágio probatório; see also Brazilian Civil Service#Tenure). Salary is pre-determined for each class/level combination, increasing with rank advancement, and includes a thirteenth salary. Federal university professors are also entitled to 45-day annual leave, compensated one-third higher than the normal salary. Hiring is done through a civil service entrance examination open to anyone eligible – though normally in Portuguese, which represents a challenge for internationals– and normally leads to the bottom rank (class A, level 1).

Career advancement is achieved through progression across levels of a given class and promotion across different classes, with each step normally requiring two years of service plus approval in a performance evaluation (internal to the university). Faculty may expedite promotion upon tenuring (3-year probation) thus advancing to the first level of class B or class C if they are holders of the required degrees (master's or PhD, respectively). Advancement to the top rank (class E) requires additionally either a type of Habilitation (defense of an original thesis) or approval of a written document (Portuguese: memorial) describing the applicant's professional achievements (in teaching, research, outreach, and academic administration); the evaluation process in this case is carried out by a special commission made of at least 75% of members external to the applicant's own university.

=== State level ===
At São Paulo state universities, particularly at the University of São Paulo, the academic rank system is as follows:

- Professor titular (MS-6): equivalent to full professor, the position normally requires years of academic experience and meaningful publications in international academic journals
- Professor associado (MS-5): must hold the title of livre docente (similar to a German Habilitation), equivalent to associate professor
- Professor doutor (MS-3): must hold a PhD, equivalent to assistant professor
- Professor assistente (MS-2): must hold a master's degree and a pedagogical preparation (PAE)
- Auxiliar de ensino (MS-1): only a bachelor's degree is required

== Research-only ==
The Portuguese scientific research career is defined by the Decree-Law 124/99 of 20 April.

Research Career:

1. Investigador-coordenador (Coordinator Researcher, equivalent to full professor status)
2. Investigador principal (Principal Researcher, equivalent to associate professor status)
3. Investigador auxiliar (Auxiliary Researcher, equivalent to assistant professor status)

This career statute also provides for the possibility of specially hired staff:

- Invited Researcher
- Assistant Researcher (minimum requirement: Master's degree)
- Research Intern (minimum requirement: Bachelor's degree)

== See also ==
- List of academic ranks
