= Marco Almeida (politician) =

Portuguese politician (born 1969)

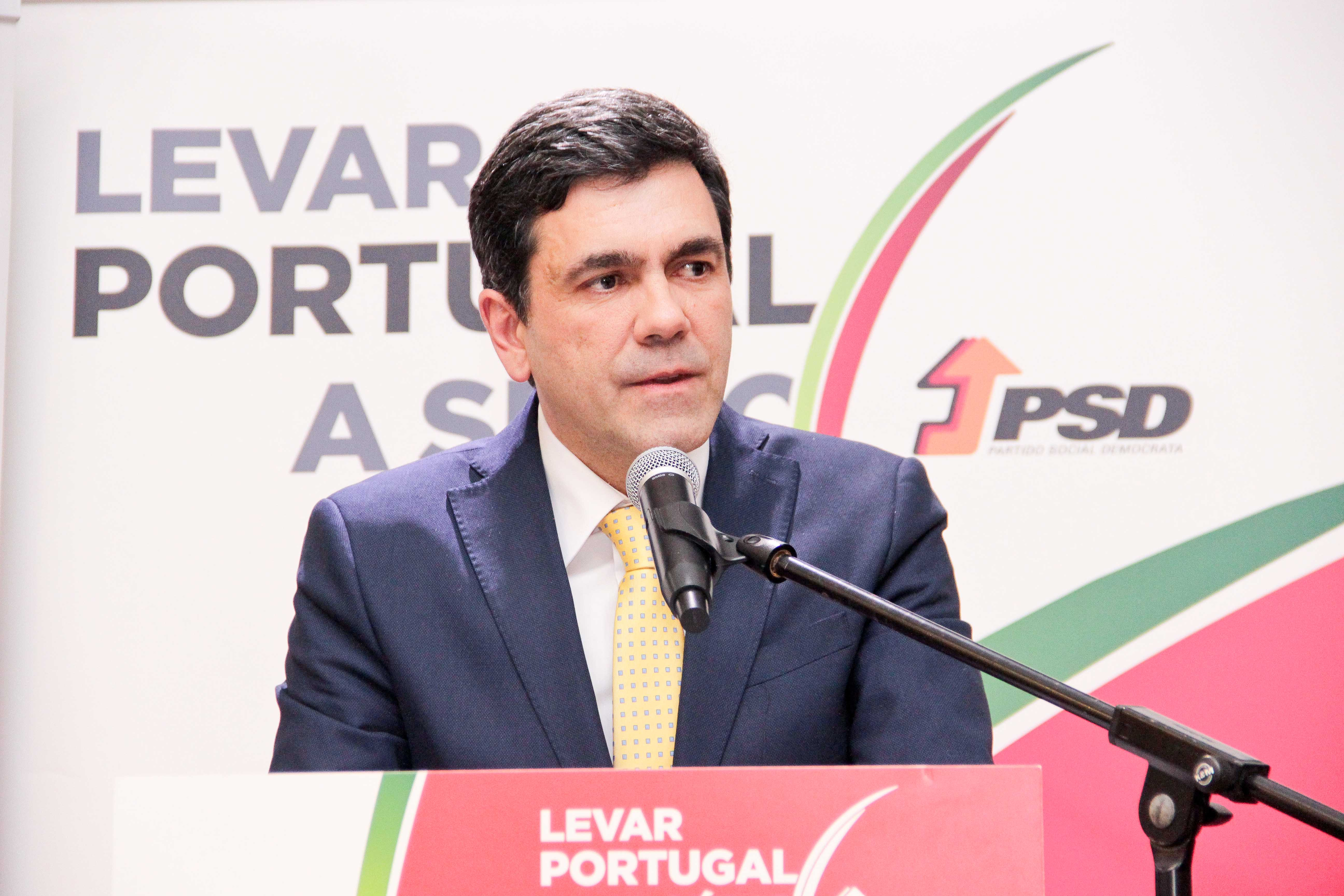
- Almeida in 2017

Mayor of Sintra
- Incumbent
- Assumed office 1 November 2025
- Preceded by: Basílio Horta

Deputy Mayor of Sintra
- In office 16 December 2001 – 21 October 2013
- Mayor: Fernando Seara

Member of the Sintra City Council
- In office 16 December 2001 – 26 September 2021

Personal details
- Born: 21 August 1969 (age 57) Lobito, Portuguese Angola, Portugal
- Citizenship: Portugal
- Party: Social Democratic Party (1992–2013; since 2018)
- Other political affiliations: Independent (2013–2018)
- Children: 2
- Education: Faculty of Social and Human Sciences
- Occupation: Teacher • Politician

Marco Almeida (born 21 August 1969) is a Portuguese politician and teacher. He is the Mayor of Sintra, one of Portugal's largest cities, as a member of the Social Democratic Party.

== Political career ==
His political activity began in 1991, during Cavaco Silva's presidential campaign. He joined the PSD in 1992 and held various local, district, and national party positions until 2010, including the presidency of the PSD Cacém Section (2001–2006) and participation in the PSD National Political Committee under the leadership of Manuela Ferreira Leite (2008–2010).

In the municipal sphere, he was elected to the executive of the Agualva-Cacém Parish Council in 1993, led the PSD caucus in the Agualva-Cacém Parish Assembly in 1997, and, in 2001, became a councilor on the Sintra City Council, serving as vice-president and holding various positions, including Education, Health, Social Action, Sports, Housing, and Civil Protection.

In the 2013 local elections, he ran against the PSD ticket for mayor of Sintra, with the independent movement "Sintrenses com Marco Almeida," finishing second with 31,246 votes. Between 2013 and 2017, he served as a non-permanent opposition councilor.

In the 2017 local elections, he ran again for mayor of Sintra, this time in a coalition between the PSD, CDS-PP, PPM, and MPT, finishing second.

In 2018, he rejoined the PSD. In 2025, he ran again for Mayor of Sintra, and was elected on 12 October.
