= António Capucho =

Portuguese politician (born 1945)

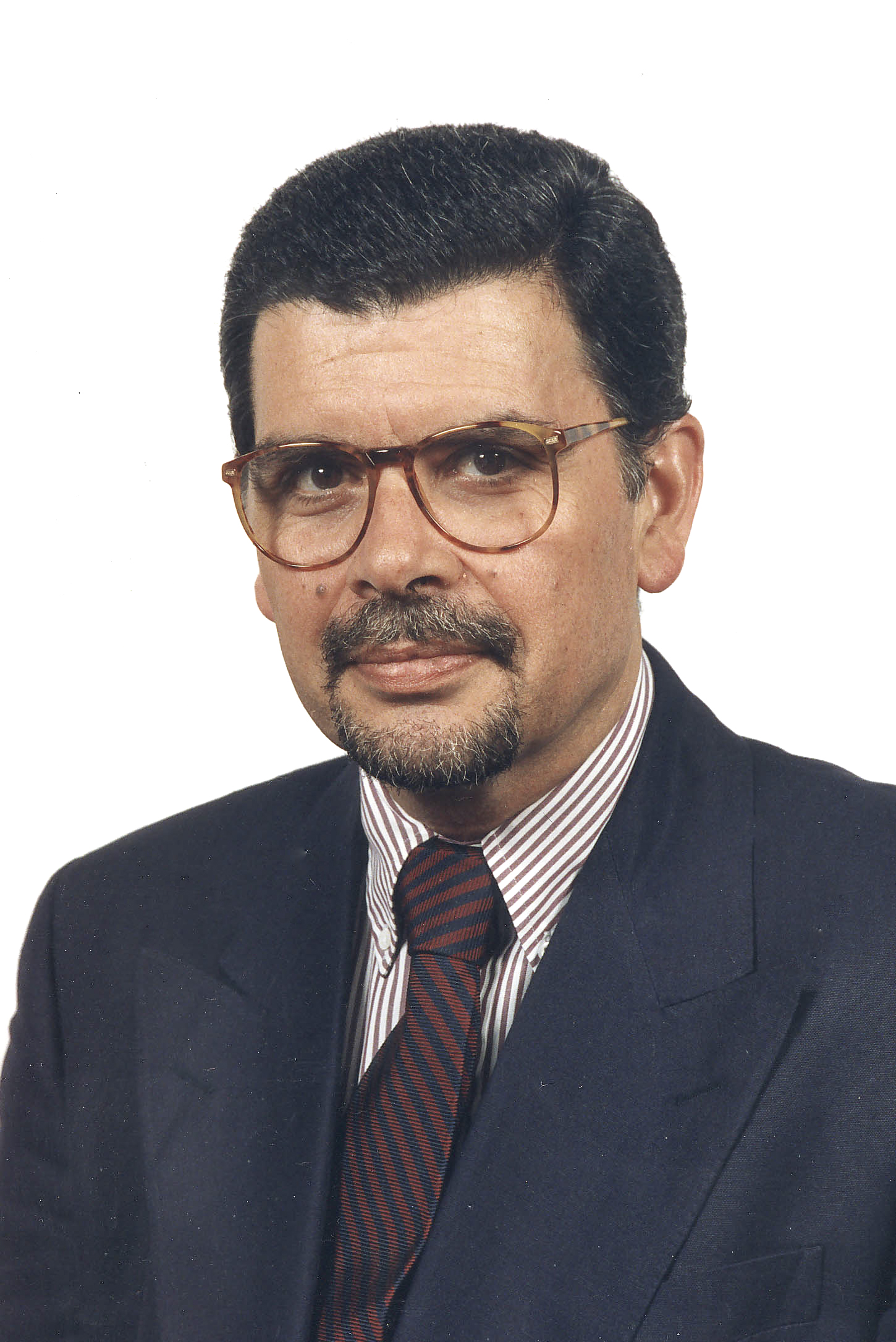
Official portrait of António Capucho as an MEP in 1994

António d'Orey Capucho (born 3 January 1945) is a Portuguese politician who has served as Mayor of Cascais from 2001 until 2011. He was also Minister of Parliamentary Affairs from 1987 until 1989 and Minister of the Quality of Life from 1983 until 1984.

A member of the Social Democratic Party, he held several offices inside the PSD, such as Secretary-general of the party and Vice President. He was expelled from the party in 2014 after being a candidate for the Municipal Assembly of Sintra under the independent list of Marco Almeida, having returned in 2018 under the leadership of Rui Rio.

In the 2025 local election in Cascais he supported Independent candidate João Maria Jonet, and he was a supporter of Henrique Gouveia e Melo in the 2026 presidential election.
