= João Bosco Mota Amaral =

Portuguese politician

João Bosco Mota Amaral GCC GCIH
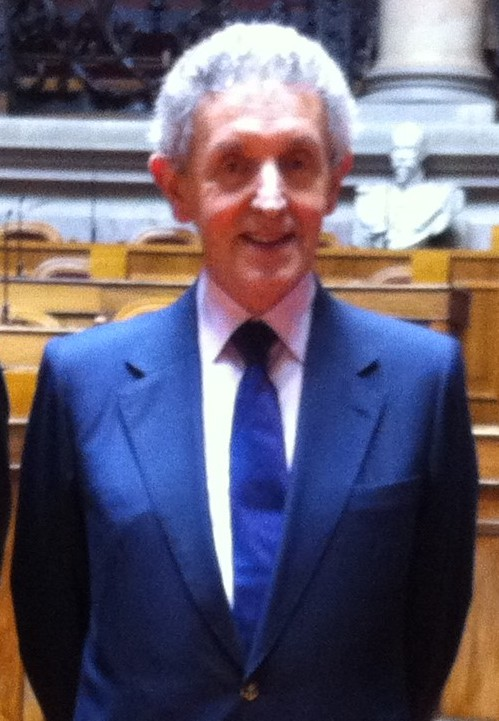
- Mota Amaral in 2011

President of the Assembly of the Republic
- In office 10 April 2002 – 16 March 2005
- Preceded by: Almeida Santos
- Succeeded by: Jaime Gama

President of the Regional Government of the Azores
- In office 8 September 1976 – 20 October 1995
- Preceded by: Altino Pinto de Magalhães (as President of the Regional Junta of the Azores)
- Succeeded by: Alberto Madruga da Costa

Member of the Assembly of the Republic
- In office 27 October 1995 – 22 October 2015
- Constituency: Azores
- In office 3 June 1976 – 12 November 1980
- Constituency: Ponta Delgada

Personal details
- Born: João Bosco Soares Mota Amaral; 15 April 1943 (age 83) Ponta Delgada, São Miguel Island, Azores
- Party: Social Democratic Party (since 1974)
- Education: University of Lisbon

João Bosco Soares Mota Amaral (born 15 April 1943) is a Portuguese politician. He served as President of the Assembly of the Republic of Portugal from 2002 to 2005 and President of the Autonomous Regional Government of the Azores from 1976 to 1995.

== Career ==
He earned a Master's degree in Law from the Faculty of Law of the University of Lisbon and has a Doctorate honoris causa in Economic Sciences from the University of the Azores.

He integrated the Liberal Wing, led by Francisco Sá Carneiro, and was elected a Deputy to the National Assembly in 1969.

He was one of the Founders of the then Popular Democratic Party (PPD) in May 1974, a month after the Carnation Revolution, together with Francisco Sá Carneiro, Francisco Pinto Balsemão, Joaquim Magalhães Mota, Carlos Mota Pinto, Alberto João Jardim, António Barbosa de Melo and António Marques Mendes, being responsible for the Foundation of the branch of Azores, becoming a Deputy to the Constituent Assembly and to the Assembly of the Republic in all legislatures.

He was the first President of the Azores from 1976 to 1995.

He was the Vice-President of the Assembly of the Portuguese Republic in the 7th and the 8th Legislatures (27 October 1995 - 4 April 2002) and a Member of the Delegation of the Assembly of the Republic to the Parliamentary Assembly of the European Council and the Western European Union in the same Legislatures, reintegrating them into the 10th.

He was President of the Assembly of the Republic of Portugal from 10 April 2002 to 16 March 2005.

He was also a Member of the Portuguese Council of State from 1982 to 1995 and again from 2001 to 2005.

== Family ==
He has never married and has no children.

== Honours ==
=== National ===
- Grand Cross of the Military Order of Christ (12 December 1995)
- Grand Cross of the Order of Prince Henry (19 April 1986)

=== Foreign ===
- Austria: Grand Decoration of Honour in Gold with Sash of the Decoration of Honour for Services to the Republic of Austria (31 January 2005)
- Brazil: Grand Cross of the Order of the Southern Cross (16 September 2003)
- Chile: Grand Cross of the Order of Bernardo O'Higgins (12 December 2005)
- France: Grand Officer of the National Order of Merit (28 January 1991)
- Germany: Knight Commander's Cross of the Order of Merit, Germany (18 May 1999)
- Hungary: Grand Cross of the Hungarian Order of Merit (16 October 2002)
- Poland: Grand Cross of the Order of Merit of the Republic of Poland (8 July 2004)
