= António de Almeida Santos =

Portuguese lawyer, politician and government minister

António de Almeida Santos GCC, GCIH, GCL
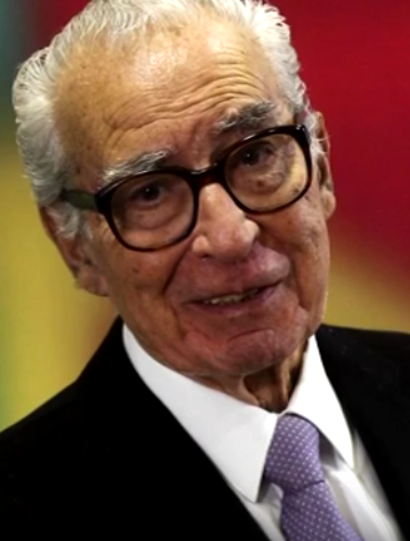

President of the Socialist Party
- In office 21 February 1992 – 9 September 2011
- Secretary-General: António Guterres; Eduardo Ferro Rodrigues; José Sócrates; António José Seguro
- Preceded by: João Ferraz de Abreu
- Succeeded by: Maria de Belém Roseira

President of the Assembly of the Republic
- In office 31 October 1995 – 4 April 2002
- Preceded by: António Barbosa de Melo
- Succeeded by: João Bosco Mota Amaral

Ministerial offices
- 1983–1985: Minister of State
- 1978–1978: Minister in the Cabinet of the Prime Minister
- 1976–1978: Minister of Justice
- 1975–1976: Minister of Social Communication
- 1974–1975: Minister of Interterritorial Coordination

Personal details
- Born: 15 February 1926 Seia, Portugal
- Died: 18 January 2016 (aged 89) Oeiras, Portugal
- Party: Socialist Party
- Education: University of Coimbra

António de Almeida Santos GCC, GCIH, GCL (15 February 1926 – 18 January 2016) was a Portuguese lawyer, politician and government minister.

== Career ==
Born in Seia, Portugal, António de Almeida Santos was a jurist who graduated as a licentiate in Law from the Faculty of Law of the University of Coimbra in 1950. In 1952 he went to the city of Lourenço Marques, Overseas Province of Mozambique (now Maputo, Mozambique) where he was a lawyer from 1953 to 1974 and a Member of the Group of Democrats of Mozambique. Following the Carnation Revolution in Portugal, he returned to Lisbon.

As an Independent he was Minister of the Interterritorial Coordination in the first four Provisional Governments, of the Social Communication in the 6th, and Minister of Justice in the 1st Constitutional Government of Mário Soares. In those functions he entered the Socialist Party (PS) in its 2nd Congress. In the 2nd Constitutional Government he was the Adjoint Minister to the Prime Minister of Portugal Mário Soares and in the 6th Constitutional Government he was Minister of State and of Parliamentary Affairs. He was also the President of the Parliamentary Group of PS between 16 October 1992 and 10 November 1993, and the President of PS in 1992, reelected in 1994.

He was elected the 10th President of the Assembly of the Republic in the 7th and 8th Legislatures (31 October 1995 – 4 April 2002).

António de Almeida Santos was also a Member of the Portuguese Council of State from 1985 until his death, as the President of the Assembly of the Republic from 31 October 1995 to 4 April 2002, and from then on as a Member elected by the Assembly of the Republic. In January 2016, aged 89, he died at his home in Oeiras after a brief illness.

== Awards and honours ==
=== Awards ===
In 2003 was awarded the North-South Prize.

=== Honours ===
- Grand-Cross of the Order of Liberty, Portugal (25 April 2004)
- Grand-Cross of the Order of Christ, Portugal (6 June 2008)
- Grand-Cross of the Order of Prince Henry, Portugal (8 March 2017)

== Family ==
He was married. One of his daughters died of a drug overdose, which led him to become a supporter of the fight against the criminalization of drug consumption. He defended drug legalization.
