= José Pacheco Pereira =

Portuguese politician

José Pacheco Pereira GCL
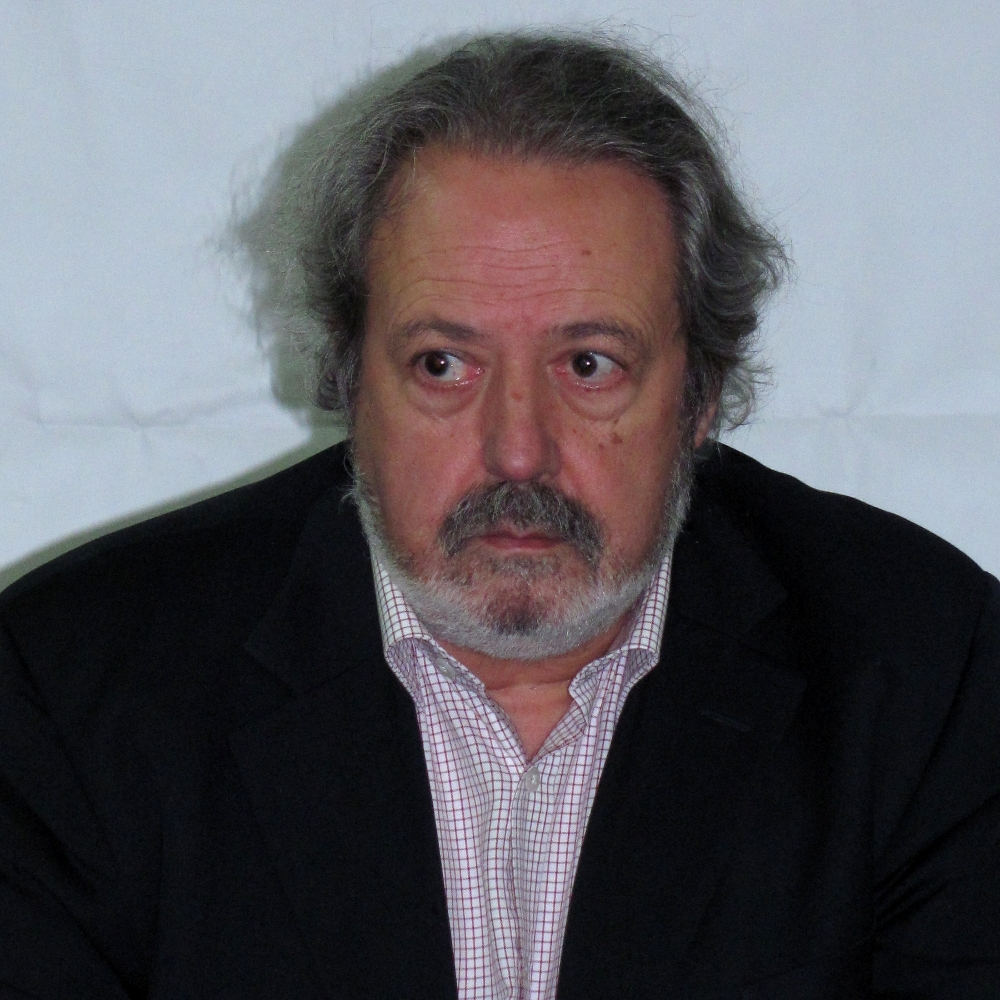

Member and Vice-President of the European Parliament
- In office 20 July 1999 – 19 July 2004
- Constituency: Portugal

Member of the Assembly of the Republic Elections: 1987, 1991, 1995, 2009
- In office 15 October 2009 – 19 June 2011
- Constituency: Santarém
- In office 27 October 1995 – 24 October 1999
- Constituency: Aveiro
- In office 4 November 1991 – 26 October 1995
- Constituency: Porto
- In office 13 August 1987 – 3 November 1991
- Constituency: Lisbon

Personal details
- Born: José Álvaro Machado Pacheco Pereira; 6 January 1949 (age 77) Porto, Portugal
- Party: Social Democratic Party (1988-present)
- Other political affiliations: Communist Party of Portugal (Marxist–Leninist) (1972-1976)
- Spouse: Isabel Maria de Seabra Correia Soares (m. 1975)
- Children: 1
- Education: Porto University
- Profession: Historian

José Álvaro Machado Pacheco Pereira, GCL (born 6 January 1949 in Porto) is a Portuguese political commentator, historian and politician. He is a member of the center-right Social Democratic Party.

== Biography ==
He was born in Porto and graduated in Philosophy from Porto University, after having studied law at Lisbon University. He was born to parents Álvaro Gonçalo de Lima Pacheco Pereira (born 4 August 1921 in Porto, Bonfim), related to the Lords of Aveloso by bastard line and Maria Celina Machado (5 July 1921 in Porto – 1997).

He was a member of the Communist Party of Portugal (Marxist-Leninist) prior to the 25 April 1974 Carnation Revolution. He left the far-left in 1976. He later became a member of the center-right Social Democratic Party, and was a Deputy (i.e. Member) of the Portuguese Parliament for three mandates and Member and Vice-President of the European Parliament from 1999 to 2004.

He is a regular columnist in the written press (Público newspaper and Sábado magazine) and television pundit (SIC Notícias news channel). He also contributes to the weekly debate program O Princípio da Incerteza on TSF radio, where he comments on Portuguese and international political affairs. He also teaches at Instituto Superior de Ciências do Trabalho e da Empresa (ISCTE).

Pacheco Pereira has mixed conservative and liberal political and social views. He supported Iraq War in 2003, like most of his party. He supports abortion but opposes same-sex marriage, which he believes promotes homophobia. He is against adoption by same-sex couples. He has stated several times that the Constitution of Portugal should drop the prohibition of fascist parties.

== Personal life ==
He married in Porto on 7 November 1975 Isabel Maria de Seabra Correia Soares, born at São Vicente de Pereira Jusã, Ovar, on 11 September 1949, daughter of Manuel Correia Soares and wife Maria Ludovina Correia de Seabra, and has one son, José Gonçalo Soares Pacheco Pereira, born in Porto in 1985.

He lives in Marmeleira, Rio Maior.

== Works ==
- As lutas operárias contra a carestia de vida em Portugal: a greve geral de Novembro de 1918 (1971);
- Questões sobre o movimento operário português e a revolução russa de 1917 (1971);
- Elementos para o estudo da origem do movimento operário no Porto: as associações mutualistas (1982);
- Notícias históricas do concelho e vila de Boticas, de L. de Figueiredo da Guerra - recolha, organização e notas (1982);
- Conflitos sociais nos campos do sul de Portugal (1983);
- Estudos sobre o comunismo: boletim de estudos interdisciplinares sobre o comunismo e os movimentos comunistas (1983-) (dir.);
- 1984: a esquerda face ao totalitarismo, com João Carlos Espada (1984);
- A Federação Nacional dos Trabalhadores Rurais (1912-1926): síntese da comunicação (1985);
- A sombra: estudo sobre a clandestinidade comunista (1993);
- O nome e a coisa: textos dos anos 80 e 90 (1997);
- Desesperada Esperança e outros textos (1999);
- Álvaro Cunhal, Uma Biografia Política. I Vol.: Daniel, O Jovem Revolucionário (1913-1941) (1999);
- Bíblia. Lamentações: Senhor, terá acabado a história? (2001);
- Álvaro Cunhal, Uma Biografia Política. II Vol.: Duarte, O Dirigente Clandestino (1941-1949), II vol. (2001);
- Vai pensamento: ensaios e outros textos (2002);
- O Mundo depois da guerra do Iraque: [textos e entrevistas] (2003), em colaboração;
- Álvaro Cunhal, Uma Biografia Política. III Vol.: O Prisioneiro (1949-1960) (2005);
- Quod Erat Demonstrandum - Diário das Presidenciais (Julho 2005 - Janeiro 2006) (2006).

== Translations ==
He has translated the works:

- Da prática de onde vêm as ideias justas, de Mao Tsé-Tung, com Maria Helena (1971);
- Cartas sobre o materialismo histórico, de F. Engels (1971).
