= Povo Livre =

Portuguese weekly newspaper

Povo Livre (English: Free People) is a Portuguese language weekly newspaper published in Portugal.

== History and profile ==
Povo Livre was established shortly after the Portuguese press was freed from censorship on 25 March 1974. The paper is the official organ of the Social Democratic Party and is based in Lisbon.

In the 1970s Rui Machete served as the editor of the weekly.
