= Social Democratic Party (Portugal) =

Centre-right political party in Portugal

Social Democratic Party Partido Social Democrata
- Abbreviation: PPD/PSD
- President: Luís Montenegro
- Secretary-General: Hugo Soares
- Founder: Francisco Sá Carneiro
- Founded: 6 May 1974; 52 years ago
- Legalized: 17 January 1975; 51 years ago
- Headquarters: Rua de S. Caetano à Lapa, 9, 1249-087 Lisboa
- Newspaper: Povo Livre
- Youth wing: Social Democratic Youth
- Women's wing: Social Democratic Women
- Workers wing: Social Democratic Workers
- Membership (2025): ▲91,500
- Ideology: Liberal conservatism; Christian democracy
- Political position: Centre-right
- National affiliation: AD (since 2024); AP/PàF (2014–2015); AD (1979–1983)
- European affiliation: European People's Party
- European Parliament group: European People's Party Group
- International affiliation: Centrist Democrat International; International Democrat Union (formerly)
- Colours: Orange
- Anthem: "Paz, Pão, Povo e Liberdade" "Peace, Bread, People and Freedom"
- Assembly of the Republic: 89 / 230
- European Parliament: 6 / 21
- Regional parliaments: 46 / 104
- Local government (Mayors): 136 / 308
- Local government (Parishes): 1,445 / 3,216

Election symbol
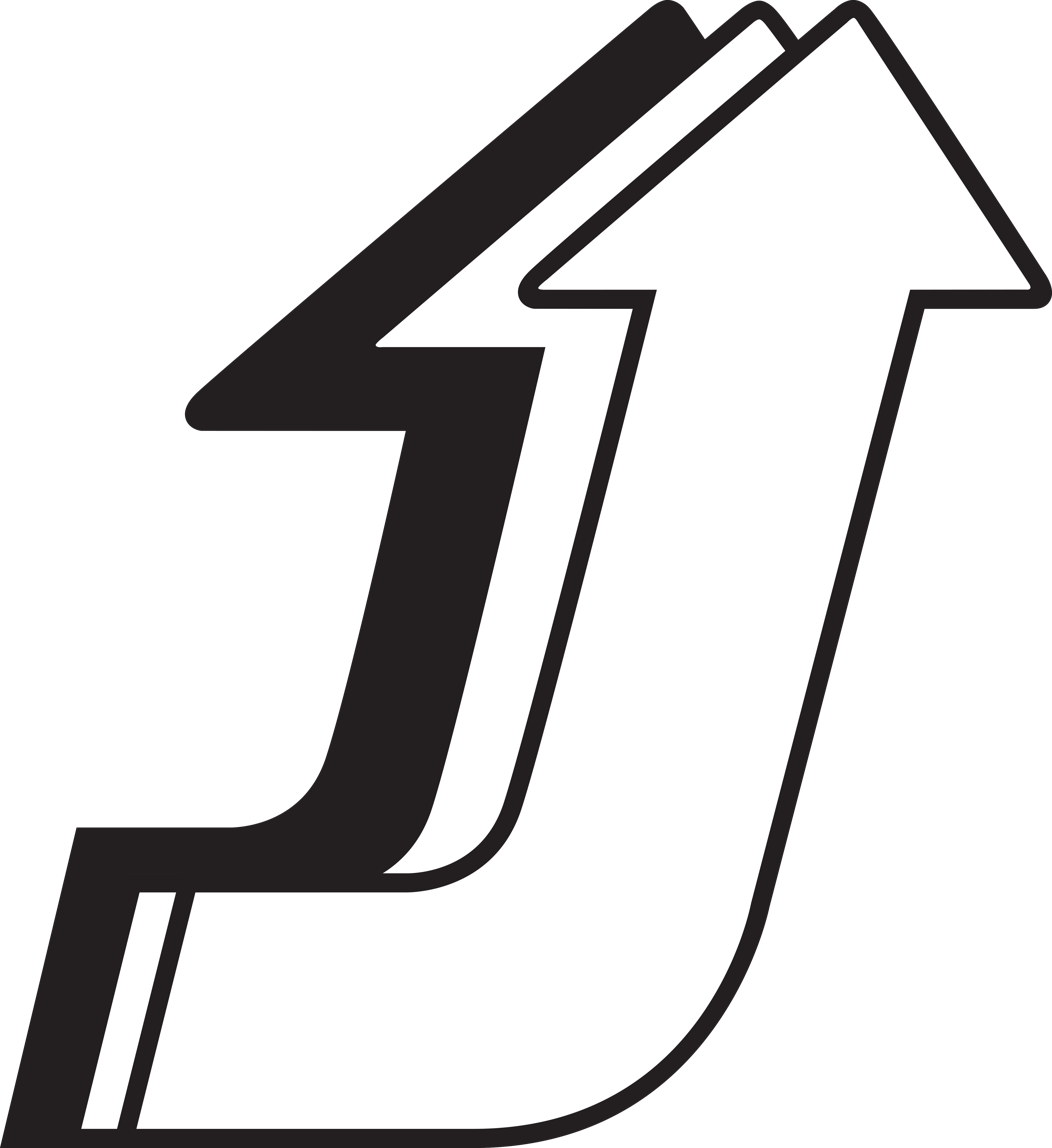

Party flag

Website
- psd.pt

The Social Democratic Party (Portuguese: Partido Social Democrata [pɐɾˈtiðu susiˈal dɨmuˈkɾatɐ], PSD) is a liberal-conservative political party in Portugal. Commonly known by its colloquial initials PSD, on ballot papers its initials appear as its official form PPD/PSD, with the first three letters coming from the party's original name, the Democratic People's Party (Partido Popular Democrático, PPD). A party of the centre-right, the PSD is one of the three major parties in Portuguese politics, its rivals being the Socialist Party (PS) on the centre-left and the far-right Chega (CH) party.

The PSD was founded in 1974, two weeks after the Carnation Revolution. In 1976, the party adopted its current name. In 1979, the PSD allied with centre-right parties to form the Democratic Alliance and won that year's election. One year later, the party's founder and then Prime Minister, Francisco Sá Carneiro died in a plane crash. After the 1983 general election, the party formed a grand coalition with the Socialist Party, known as the Central Bloc, before winning the 1985 general election under new leader Aníbal Cavaco Silva, who shifted the party to the right. Cavaco Silva served as prime minister for ten years, instituting major economic liberalisation and winning two landslide victories. After he stepped down, the PSD lost the 1995 election. The party was returned to power under José Manuel Durão Barroso in 2002, but was defeated in the 2005 election. The party was able to return to power after the 2011 elections and four years later was able to win a plurality in the 2015 legislative election, winning 107 seats in the Assembly of the Republic in alliance with the CDS – People's Party, but being unable to form a minority government and went back to the opposition. Nine years later, in 2024, the party returned to power as a minority government, under a rebranded Democratic Alliance coalition, alongside CDS–PP and the People's Monarchist Party (PPM), a mandate that was renewed in May 2025. The party elected its current leader, Luís Montenegro, on 28 May 2022. Since the 2024 election, Montenegro has been the incumbent prime minister of Portugal.

Originally a social democratic party, the PSD became the main centre-right, conservative party in Portugal. The PSD is a member of the European People's Party and the Centrist Democrat International. Until 1996, the PSD belonged to the European Liberal Democrat and Reform Party and Liberal International. The party publishes the weekly Povo Livre (Free People) newspaper.

== History ==
=== Foundation ===
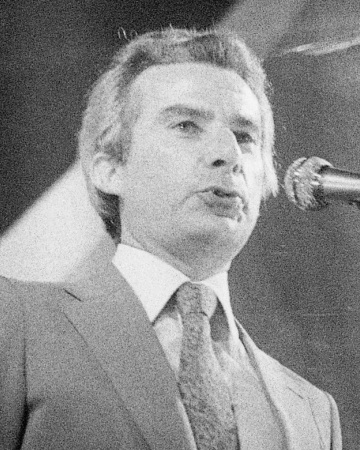
Francisco Sá Carneiro (1934–1980), PSD founder and Prime Minister (1980).

The Social Democratic Party was born on 6 May 1974, when Francisco Sá Carneiro, Francisco Pinto Balsemão and Joaquim Magalhães Mota publicly announced the formation of what was then called the PPD, the Democratic People's Party (Portuguese: Partido Popular Democrático). On 15 May, the party's first headquarters were inaugurated in Largo do Rato, Lisbon. This was followed, on 24 June, by the formation of the first Political Committee, consisting of Francisco Sá Carneiro, Francisco Pinto Balsemão, Joaquim Magalhães Mota, Barbosa de Melo, Mota Pinto, Montalvão Machado, Miguel Veiga, Ferreira Júnior, António Carlos Lima, António Salazar Silva, Jorge Correia da Cunha, Jorge Figueiredo Dias and Jorge Sá Borges.

The Povo Livre publication was founded, its first issue being published on 13 July 1974, led by its first two directors, Manuel Alegria and Rui Machete. The PPD's first major meeting was held in the Pavilhão dos Desportos, Lisbon, on 25 October, and a month later the party's first official congress took place.

On 17 January 1975, 6300 signatures were sent to the Supreme Court so that the party could be approved as a legitimate political entity, which happened a mere eight days later.

In 1975, the PPD applied unsuccessfully to join the Socialist International, with its membership attempt vetoed by the Socialist Party.

Alberto João Jardim was the co-founder of the Madeiran branch of the PSD, and governed the autonomous archipelago for decades, running as a member of the party.

=== Democratic Alliance governments ===
The Democratic People's Party participated in a number of coalition governments in Portugal between 1974 and 1976, following the Carnation Revolution. This is seen as a transitional period in Portuguese politics, in which political institutions were built and took time to stabilize. In 1976, the party adopted its current name. In 1979, the PSD formed an electoral alliance, known as the Democratic Alliance (AD), with the Democratic and Social Centre (now called the People's Party, CDS-PP) and a couple of smaller right-wing parties. The AD won the parliamentary elections towards the end of 1979, and the PSD leader, Francisco Sá Carneiro, became Prime Minister. The PSD would be part of all governments until 1995. The AD increased its parliamentary majority in new elections called for 1980, but was devastated by the death of Sá Caneiro in an air crash on 4 December 1980. Francisco Pinto Balsemão took over the leadership of both the Social Democratic Party and the Democratic Alliance, as well as the Prime Ministership, but lacking Sá Carneiro's charisma, he was unable to rally popular support.

The Democratic Alliance was dissolved in 1983, and in parliamentary elections that year, the PSD lost to the Socialist Party (PS). Falling short of a majority, the Socialists formed a grand coalition, known as the Central Bloc, with the PSD. Many right-wingers in the PSD, including Aníbal Cavaco Silva, opposed participation in the PS-led government, and so, when Cavaco Silva was elected leader of the party on 2 June 1985, the coalition was doomed.

=== Cavaco Silva governments (1985–1995) ===
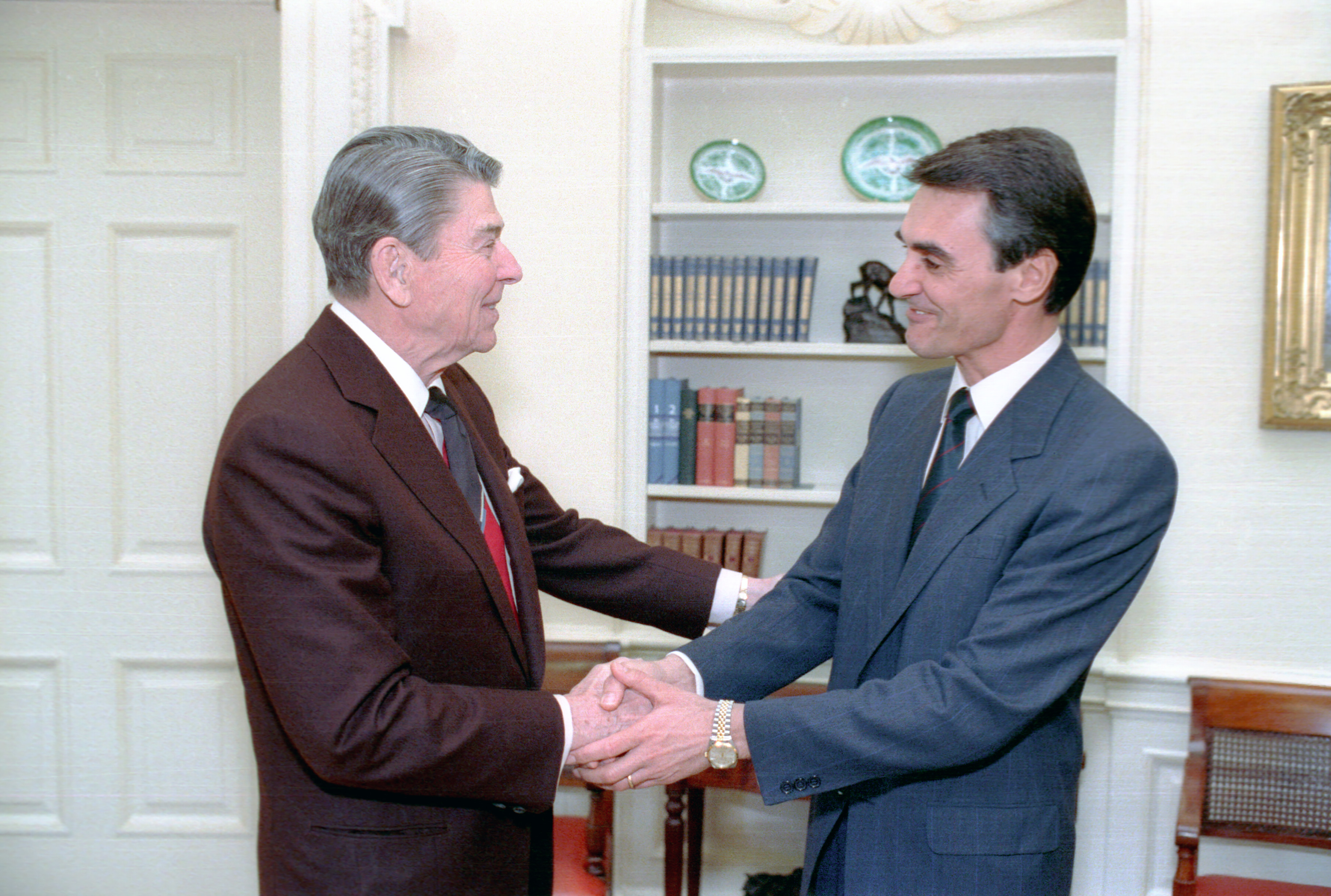
Aníbal Cavaco Silva, Prime Minister 1985–1995, meeting US President Ronald Reagan in 1988.

The PSD won a plurality (but not a majority) in the general election of 1985, and Cavaco Silva became Prime Minister. Economic liberalization and tax cuts ushered in several years of economic growth. After a motion of no confidence was approved, early elections were called for July 1987, which resulted in a landslide victory for the PSD, who captured 50.2 percent of the popular vote and 148 of the 250 parliamentary seats – the first time that any political party in Portugal had mustered an absolute majority in a free election. While the PSD had been very popular going into the election, the size of its victory far exceeded the party's most optimistic projections. A strong economy, growing above 7 percent in 1988, ushered a big convergence between Portugal and other EU countries.

The PSD won a historic third term in the 1991 election, with a slightly higher vote share than four years earlier, 50.6 percent. The early 1990s recession hit Portugal in 1993 and high levels of unemployment adding to this fiscal adjustments, eroded the popularity of the Cavaco Silva's government. The anti-tolls riots in 25 de Abril Bridge in June 1994 and the violent response from security forces, further undermined Cavaco Silva's position. In early 1995, Cavaco Silva announced he would not run for a fourth term as Prime Minister.

=== Post-Cavaco Silva ===
After Cavaco Silva stepped down as leader in January 1995, in the following month, in the PSD congress, the party elected Fernando Nogueira as leader. The PSD lost the 1995 election to the PS. In 1996, Cavaco Silva ran for the presidency of the republic, but he failed to defeat former Lisbon Mayor Jorge Sampaio. Sampaio won 53.9 percent to Cavaco's 46.1 percent. The party, for the first time in 16 years, was out of government. In 1996, Marcelo Rebelo de Sousa was elected party leader, and held that post until 1999. At the time, the party reviewed its membership database, resulting in a correction from 183,000 in 1996 to 77,000 in 1999. Rebelo de Sousa resigned in April 1999 and shortly after, José Manuel Durão Barroso was elected party leader. The party was again defeated in the 1999 elections. The party made a big comeback in the 2001 local elections by winning several cities, like Lisbon, Porto and Sintra, from the PS and, some, against all odds and predictions. This PSD result led the then Prime Minister António Guterres (PS) to resign and the country was led to snap general elections in March 2002.

=== First PSD/CDS coalition government (2002–2005) ===
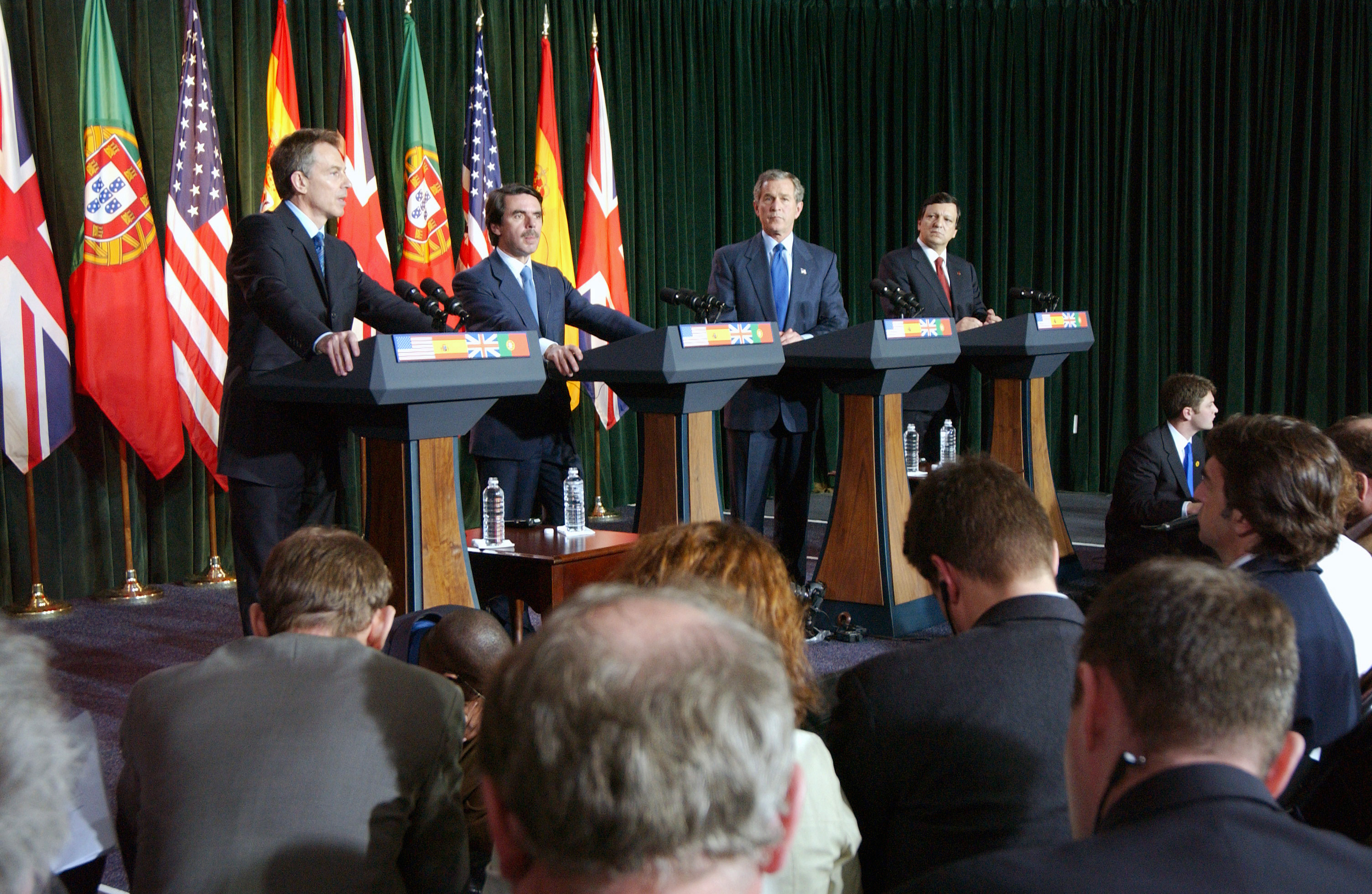
Durão Barroso, Prime Minister 2002–2004, in a press briefing with Tony Blair, George W. Bush and José Maria Aznar in 2003.

The PSD made a comeback in 2002, defeating the PS by a 40 to 38 percent margin. Despite falling short of a majority, it won enough seats to form a coalition with the CDS-PP and its leader, José Manuel Durão Barroso, became Prime Minister. During his term, Barroso aligned Portugal with the United Kingdom, the United States and Spain in the support for the 2003 American-led invasion of Iraq, hosting a summit in Lajes Field, which divided public opinion.

In the 2004 European Parliament election, the PSD formed an electoral coalition with CDS-PP, the first since 1980, but was soundly defeated by the PS by 45 to 33 percent margin. A few days after the election, Durão Barroso announced his resignation from the office of Prime Minister in order to become President of the European Commission, leaving the way for Pedro Santana Lopes, by then Mayor of Lisbon and a man with whom he was frequently at odds, to become leader of the party and Prime Minister.

=== Back in opposition (2005–2011) ===
In the parliamentary election held on 20 February 2005, Santana Lopes led the PSD to its worst defeat since 1983. With a negative swing of more than 12 percent, the party won only 75 seats, a loss of 30. The rival Socialist Party had won an absolute majority, and remained in government after the 2009 parliamentary election, albeit without an absolute majority, leaving the PSD in opposition.

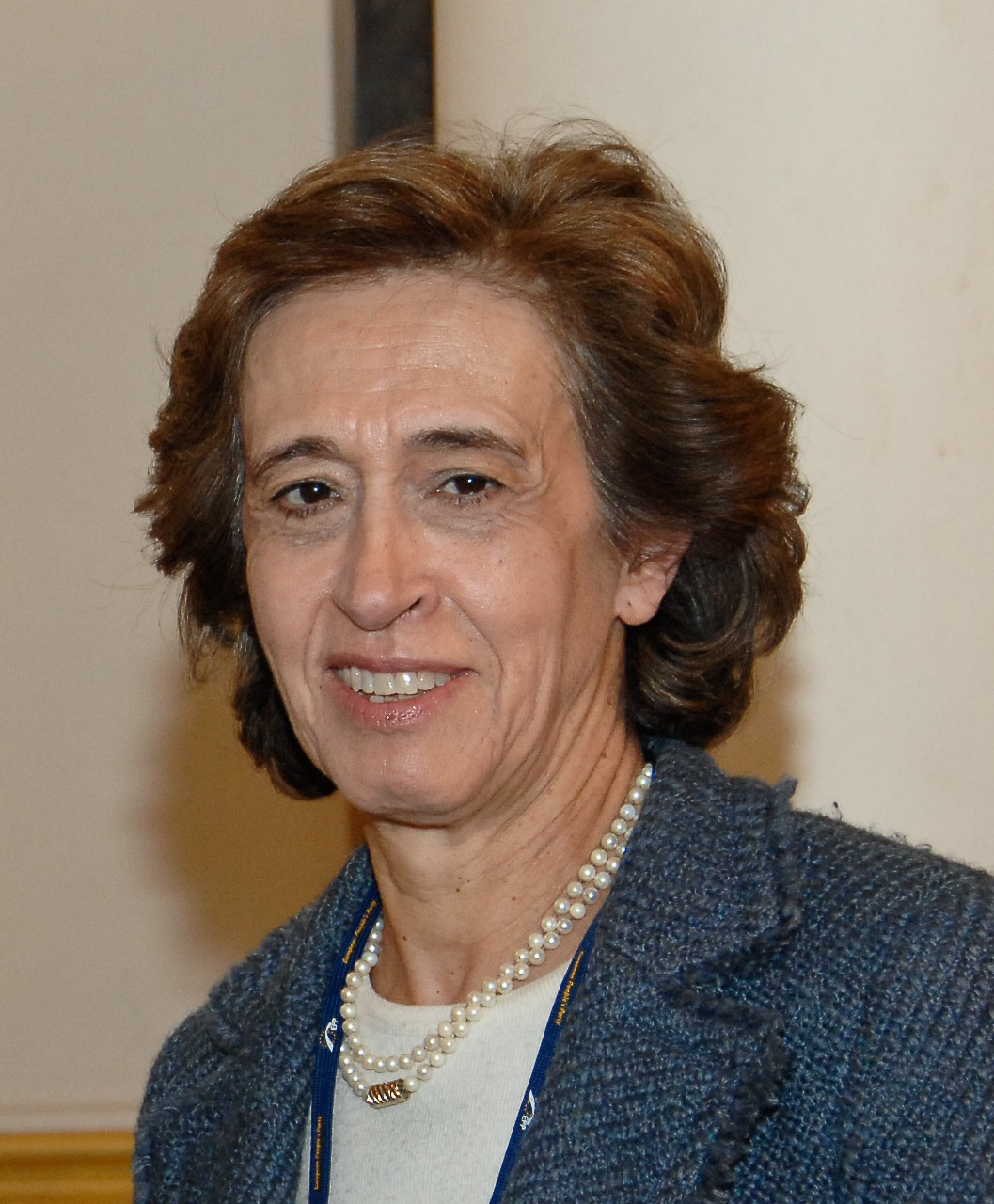
Manuela Ferreira Leite, the first woman to lead a major party in Portuguese democracy and the still only woman to ever lead the PSD.

The PSD-supported candidate Aníbal Cavaco Silva won the Portuguese presidential elections in 2006 and again in 2011. After the 2005 elections, Luís Marques Mendes was elected leader of the party. Internal infighting weakened Marques Mendes and, in September 2007, Marques Mendes was defeated by Luís Filipe Menezes by a 54% to 42% margin. Menezes was also incapable of dealing with his internal opposition and, after just six months in the job, Menezes resigned. On 31 May 2008, Manuela Ferreira Leite became the first female leader of a major Portuguese party. She won 38 percent of the votes, against the 31% of Pedro Passos Coelho and the 30% of Pedro Santana Lopes.

In the European Parliament election held on 7 June 2009, the PSD defeated the governing socialists, capturing 31.7 percent of the popular vote and electing eight MEPs, while the Socialist Party only won 26.5 percent and elected seven MEPs.

Although this was expected to be a "redrawing of the electoral map", the PSD has still defeated later that year, though the PS lost its majority. Pedro Passos Coelho was elected leader in March 2010, with 61 percent of the votes.

=== Second PSD/CDS coalition government (2011–2015) ===
Growing popular disenchantment with the government's handling of the economic crisis coupled with the government's inability to secure the support of other parties to implement the necessary reforms to address the crisis, forced the Socialist Party Prime Minister José Sócrates to resign, leading to a fresh election on 5 June 2011. This resulted in a non-absolute majority for the PSD, leading to a coalition government with the CDS-PP, which served a full term until the 2015 general election. During this term, many austerity policies were put into practice to reduce the budget deficit but, ultimately, created unemployment and a recession that lasted until mid 2013. In September 2013, the party was defeated in the local elections by the PS, losing its status as the largest party in local government. Since then, the economy began to recover, with growth between 1 and 2 percent per trimester.

In the 2015 general election, the PSD and CDS-PP ran in a joint coalition, called Portugal Ahead, led by Pedro Passos Coelho and Paulo Portas. The coalition won the elections by a wide margin over the Socialists, capturing 38.6 percent of the votes while the Socialists captured only 32 percent, although the coalition lost 25 MPs and a more than 11 percent of the votes, thus falling well short of an absolute majority. The PSD/CDS-PP coalition was asked by the then President of the Republic, Aníbal Cavaco Silva, to form a government with Passos Coelho as Prime Minister.

=== Back in opposition (2015–2024) ===
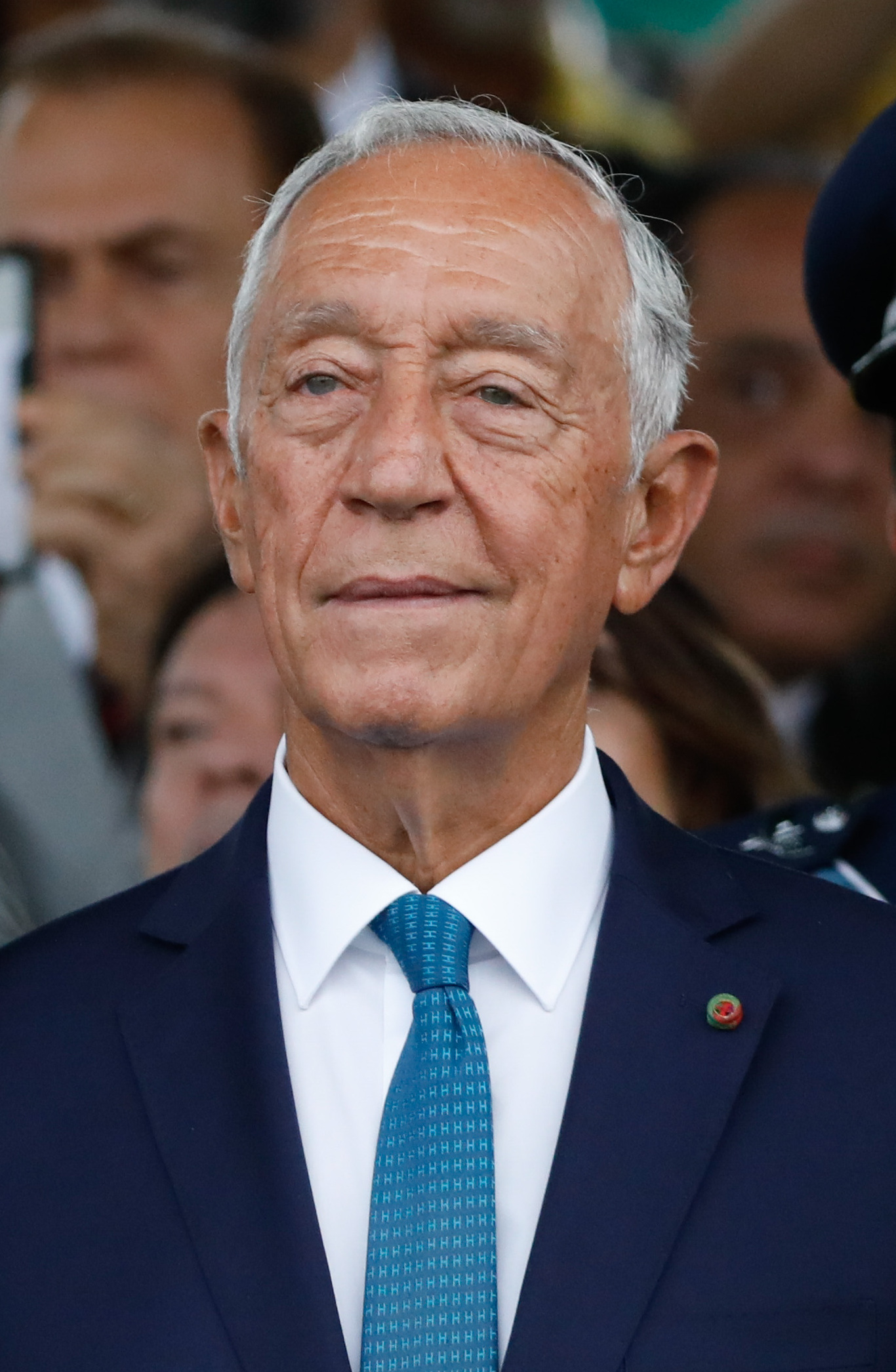
Marcelo Rebelo de Sousa, party leader between 1996–1999 and President of the Republic between 2016–2026.

The second PSD/CDS government was duly formed and took the oath of office on 30 October 2015, but fell after a no-confidence motion was approved two weeks later. Its 11 days of rule make it the shortest-lived government since Portugal has been a democracy holding free elections. After that, the PSD returned to the opposition benches, and the Socialist Party was able to form an agreement with BE and CDU to support a PS minority government led by António Costa. Pedro Passos Coelho continued as party leader, but a weak opposition strategy led to bad polling numbers for the PSD. All of this culminated with the results of the 2017 local elections. In these elections, the PSD achieved their worst results ever, winning just 98 mayors and 30 percent of the votes. Passos Coelho announced he would not run for another term as PSD leader. On 13 January 2018, Rui Rio defeated Pedro Santana Lopes by a 54 to 46 percent margin and became the new party leader. After 10 years of Cavaco Silva as President of the Republic, the PSD-supported candidate, Marcelo Rebelo de Sousa, was elected President in 2016, and reelected in 2021.

In order to avoid bankruptcy due to mounting debt, in 2017, the party, alongside the Portuguese Socialist Party, the Portuguese Communist Party, BE and the ecologist party PEV, voted in favour of abolishing party fundraising limits, thereby opening all Portuguese parties to private political donorship, that they are not obligated to disclose. The new proposal was reluctantly approved by the Portuguese president Marcelo Rebelo de Sousa.

During his first year in the leadership, Rio faced big internal opposition and, in January 2019, Rio won a motion of confidence presented by Luís Montenegro. In the EP 2019 elections, the PSD achieved their worst result ever in a national election, winning just 22 percent of the votes. The party recovered a lot of ground in the October 2019 general elections, achieving 28 percent of the votes, against the 36 percent of the PS. Nonetheless, Rio's leadership was, once again, challenged and he faced, in a two round leadership contest in January 2020, Luís Montenegro and Miguel Pinto Luz. Rio won the 1st round with 49% of the votes and defeated Luís Montenegro in the 2nd round by 53 to 47 percent margin, thus being reelected as party leader.

In the Azores 2020 regional elections, the PSD was able to return to power, after 24 years in opposition, by forging a controversial deal with CHEGA, plus CDS, PPM and IL. The PSD won almost 34 percent of the votes, while the PS fell more than 7 pp, compared with 2016, to 39 percent, an unexpected result, and overall the right wing parties had a 1-seat majority over all the left. After 2020, the PSD controls the governments of Portugal's only two autonomous regions.

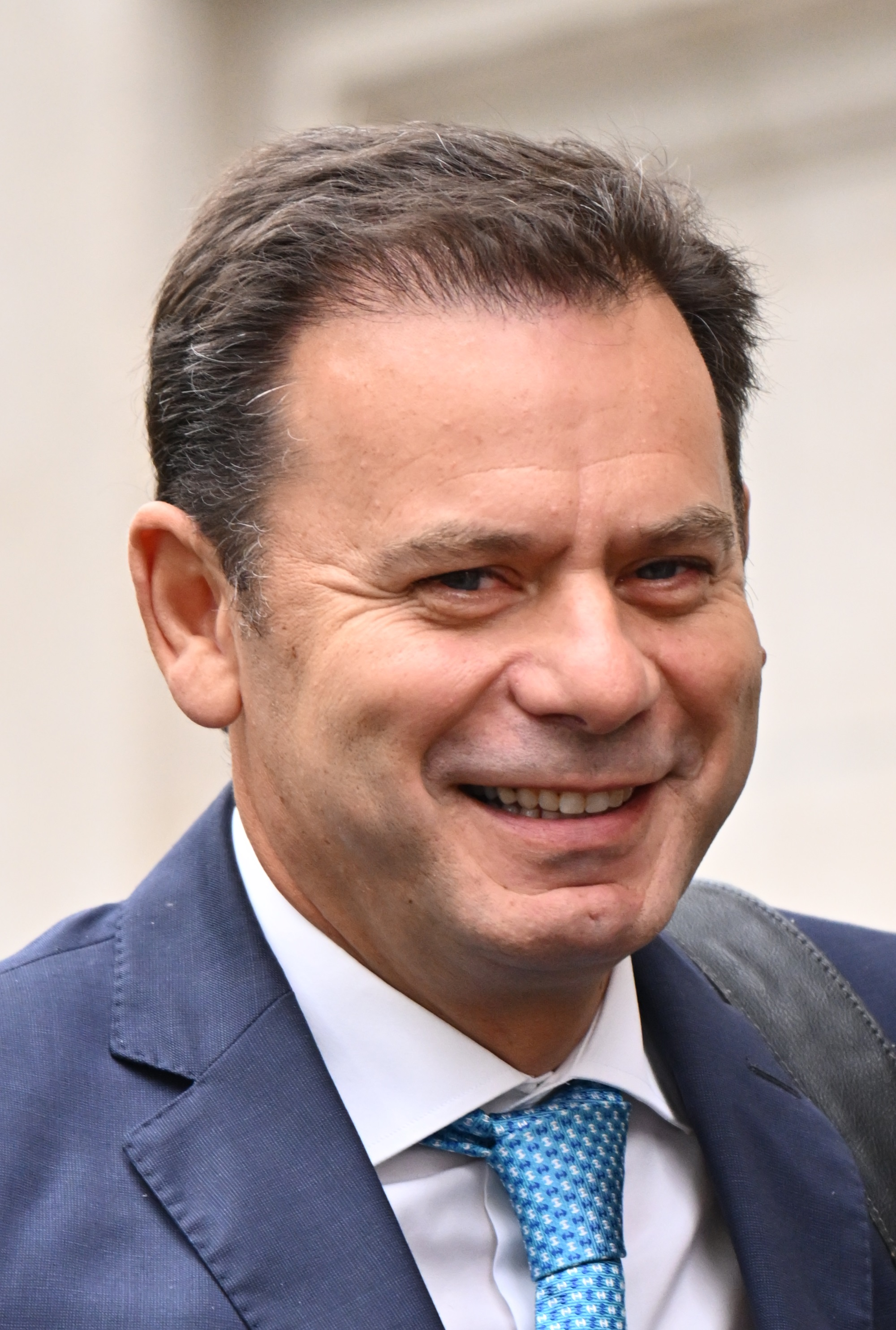
Luís Montenegro, leader since 2022 and Prime Minister since 2024.

The 2021 local elections were quite positive for the PSD, despite not winning the most mayors in the country as a whole. The party, and its led-coalitions, won a combined 32 percent of the votes and were able to win, from the PS, several cities like Coimbra, Funchal and Barcelos. The main gain of the PSD was the victory in Lisbon, where Carlos Moedas defeated, against all odds and predictions, the PS incumbent mayor Fernando Medina. In October 2021, disagreements between the PS and BE-CDU led to the rejection of the 2022 budget and the calling of a snap general election for 30 January 2022. Despite a close race predicted by polls, the PSD suffered a big setback by winning just 29% of the votes and seeing the PS gaining a surprise absolute majority, with 41% of the votes. After the election, PSD leader Rui Rio opened the process to elect a new party leader. On 28 May 2022, Luís Montenegro was elected party leader by a landslide, gathering more than 72 percent of the votes.

=== Return to power (2024–present) ===
Following António Costa's resignation due to an investigation around alleged corruption involving the award of contracts for lithium and hydrogen businesses, a snap election was called for 10 March 2024. For this election, PSD, CDS–PP and PPM decided to contest the election in a joint alliance called Democratic Alliance (AD). On election day, the AD won by a narrow 29 to 28 percent margin over the Socialist Party, and formed a minority government. Three months later, in the 2024 European Parliament elections, the AD coalition was narrowly defeated by the Socialists, 31 to 32 percent.

A new election was called for May 2025, after a vote of confidence in the AD minority government was rejected, following the revelations of the Spinumviva case involving Luís Montenegro. The AD coalition was again the winner, with a stronger mandate, gathering nearly 32 percent of the votes and 91 seats. A few months later, the PSD regained its status as the largest party in local government, after surpassing the PS in the October 2025 local elections.

In the 2026 presidential election, the party's supported candidate, former party leader between 2005 and 2007 Luís Marques Mendes, polled a dismal 5th place with just 11% of the votes, causing the party to lose the Presidency of the Republic, which it had held for 20 consecutive years.

== Ideology ==
=== Historical evolution ===
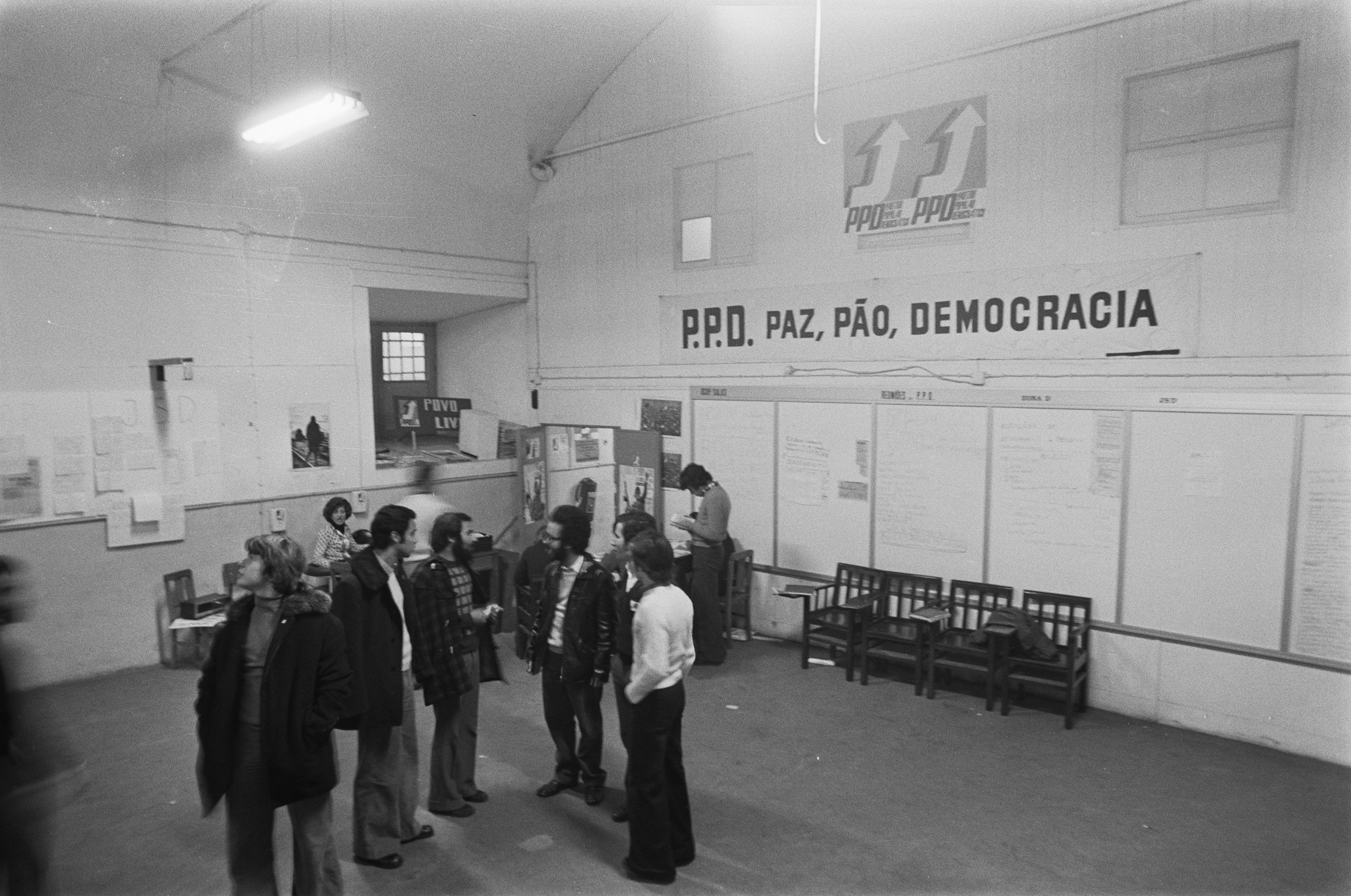
PSD (then called PPD) meeting in 1975.

The party was founded based on classical social democracy and was a centre to centre-left party. It later became a catch-all centre-right party. The party has been described as liberal-conservative, conservative-liberal, conservative, liberal and Christian democratic.

=== Factions ===
The PSD is frequently referred to as a party that is not ideology-based, but rather a power party (partido do poder). It frequently adopts a functional big tent party strategy to win elections. Due to this strategy, which most trace to Cavaco Silva's leadership, the party is made up of many factions, mostly centre-right (including liberal democrats, Christian democrats and neoconservatives) as well as quasi-social-democrats and former communists:

Portuguese social democrats
The main faction when the party was created, throughout the party's history rightist politicians joined them to have a greater chance of gaining power and influencing the country's politics (see liberals, conservatives, right-wing populists and neoliberals). They do not follow traditional social democracy, but Portuguese social democracy as defined by Francisco Sá Carneiro's actions and writings, which includes a degree of centrist and leftist populism. They followed a kind of anti-class struggle party/cross-class party strategy. All the other members of the party claim to follow this line. Among its representatives were most of the leaders between Francisco Sá Carneiro and Cavaco Silva, Alberto João Jardim (also a founding member and an anti-neoliberal) and to an extent Luís Filipe Menezes (who called the PSD the "moderate left party") identified himself with a centre-left matrix and a united left strategy and defended a more open party on issues like abortion. José Mendes Bota is another left-wing populist. The Portuguese social-democrats are centered around the Grupo da Boavista (Boavista Group).

European-style social-democrats
Follow traditional social democracy. They share with the Portuguese social democrats their presence at the creation of the party and "a non-Marxist progressivist line". Many of them (former party leader António Sousa Franco, party co-founder Magalhães Mota, writer and feminist Natália Correia) supported the Opções Inadiáveis (Pressing Options) manifesto, and then left to create the Independent Social Democrat Association (Associação Social Democrata Independente, ASDI) and the Social Democrat Movement (Movimento Social Democrata, MSD), forming electoral coalitions (later merging with) the Socialist Party during the 1970s–1980s. Some took part in the Democratic Renovator Party. A later example of a European-style Social democrat leaving the party for the Socialists is activist and politician Helena Roseta. The ones still in the party adapted to its current right-wing outlook or Portuguese social democracy. They today include former communists-turned centre-leftists, like Zita Seabra. Durão Barroso might have moved from Thatcherism to social democracy. Ironically, both Social Democrat factions were represented in the 2008 party elections by Manuela Ferreira Leite, economically neoliberal and socially conservative (often compared to Thatcher).

Agrarianism
The other main faction at creation. The PSD was always more successful in the Northern and rural areas of the country. When Sousa Franco and his SPD-inspired social democrats started their break with the rest of the party he referred to a division between "a rural wing, led by Sá Carneiro, and an urban wing, more moderate and truly social democratic, close to the positions of Helmut Schmidt" Due to the electoral influence of ruralism on the PSD's politics they may be seen inside of or influencing most factions.

Liberals (classical and social)
Due to the Salazarist connotation of the term right-wing and all terms connected (liberal and conservative) after the Carnation Revolution, the little attractiveness of economic liberalism in European politics, no specific liberal or conservative party was formed in post-1974 Portugal, except the experiences of the Catholic Action-monarchist Liberal Party in 1974 and the centrist liberal Democratic Renovator Party, so they started working inside the PSD. This strategy of joining "socialism and liberalism under the same hat" was especially successful during Cavaco Silva's leadership, when the party gave up its candidacy to the Socialist International and became member of the Liberal International and European Liberal Democrat and Reform Party and Liberal and Democratic Reformist Group, leaving the international and the European party and group in 1996 to join the Christian Democrat International (today Centrist Democrat International), the European People's Party and the European People's Party-European Democrats. Since then, the liberal-social democrat rift (or even the liberal-conservative-populist-social democrat rift) has plagued the party's cohesion and actions. Durão Barroso (a former revolutionary Maoist who switched sides in the 1980s) is sometimes referred to as the most pure liberal of the party. In terms of social liberals, some try to link both social democracy and social liberalism to the PSD, to refer to the early PSD as liberal or partly social liberal party and social liberalism is sometimes identified with the social market economy tradition the party traditionally supported. Even members of the Portuguese Social Liberal Movement admit the traditional and current presence of social liberals (and other liberals) on the PSD.

Christian democrats
Some claim the PSD as the party of Christian Democracy from the beginning, or having these currents as part of its legacy. Marcelo Rebelo de Sousa is one of the main preachers of Christian Democracy inside the PSD. As is Paulo Rangel. In October 2024, then Prime Minister and leader of the PSD also mentioned that the government and party were "not Liberal from beginning to end but Social Democratic and Christian Democrat".

Right-wing populists
Distinct from radical right-wing populists, the populist centre and centre-left social democrats (like João Jardim and Sá Carneiro), the populist overlappers (like Cavaco Silva), and the Eurosceptic populists of the Democratic and Social Centre–People's Party (CDS-PP). They are social-economic liberal conservative/conservative liberal and moderate culturally religious conservatives and internationalist national conservatives. Their main representative is Pedro Santana Lopes. Though the main right-wing populists were present at the founding of the party (like Santana Lopes), they were clearly right-wing, recruited when their abilities were noticed in educated circles and universities, with minor agreements with Sá Carneiro's philosophy. Frequently as the PSD is a bipartisanship party, right-wing populists from the CDS-PP join the party. Luís Filipe Meneses is frequently described as a populist but he tried to lead the party back to a left line, and does not identify or act like the liberal conservative/conservative liberal populists.

Conservatives
With the post-revolutionary opposition to the right (see above in liberal) no specific conservative party was founded in Portugal; conservatives acted inside the CDS-PP and the PSD. Frequently linked with the neoliberals, pure conservatives are rare in the party as the usual partisan or politician of the party is economically moderate, but socially conservative. One of the rare exceptions of a pure conservative in this party was former party member and MP Vasco Pulido Valente, who is highly elitist and a cultural purist (unlike most of the party's partisans, who have various degrees of populism or meritocracy), highly conservative and traditionalist.

Neoconservatives
Mostly former communists and leftists who supported the policies of the Bush administration and defend similar views in Portuguese politics. The main example is José Pacheco Pereira (though his support of the Bush doctrine on the 2003 American-led invasion of Iraq is sometimes challenged. They are frequently referred to as "Cavaco-ists" due to their support of cavacoism's legacy and candidates representative of it, like Cavaco Silva himself and Ferreira Leite, defending the position that they should take a hard stance on the left and its social liberalism).

Neoliberals
Neoliberal tendencies were introduced in Portuguese economy by Cavaco Silva, removing socialism from the constitution and finishing the de-collectivization of the economy started with Sá Carneiro. Cavaco (a self-described neo-Keynesian) never employed a totally Reaganite or Thatcherite strategy, maintaining a social democrat matrix and many (right and left-wing) populist and neo-Keynesian policies. Alberto João Jardim described the inconsistent neoliberalism of the PSD as "those Chicago Boys have some funny ideas, but when election time arrives the old Keynesianism is still what counts". Cavaco Silva and Durão Barroso are both sometimes referred to as the closest to neo-liberal leaders of the party. The main pure representative of the streak is Manuela Ferreira Leite, but even she called herself a social democrat and explained "I'm not certainly liberal, I'm also not populist" and lead the social democratic factions during internal party rifts, though she accepts the nickname "Portuguese iron lady" and comparisons to Thatcher if "[it] means [...] an enormous intransigence on values and in principles, of not abdicating from these values and from these principles and of continuing my way independently of the popularity of my actions and the effects on my image". The main group (officially non-partisan) associated with the neoliberal faction of the PSD is the Projecto Farol (Lighthouse Project).

Overlappers
The average PSD voter and partisan since Cavaco Silva's leadership. Cavaco himself, though a self-described Neo-Keynesian, an early member of the party since its centre-left days and a man with social-liberal and centrist populist economic policy tendencies, he is personally a social conservative (opposing same-sex marriage and abortion) and a practicing Catholic. As such, Cavacoism should be considered a "hybrid" or a political syncretism. A similar case is Vasco Graça Moura, who claims to be an economic social democrat but opposes gay people serving in the military and is a self-described "centre-left reactionary". The overlappers are mainly represented in the forums gathered by the District of Oporto section of the party, which during the 2009 European elections tried to gather the ideas of all factions.

Centrists
Not to be confused with overlappers. Still indecisive between (traditional or Portuguese) social democracy, social liberalism or any other kind of centrism.

Transversalists
Are pragmatic although open to privatization and civil society alternatives to the social state, in speech they move closer to the centre-left origins of the party and are generally proud of them. The main representative of this faction is Pedro Passos Coelho, who claims to be neither left nor right, but that "the real issues are between old and new", though his opponents identified him as a liberal (in the conservative-liberal or neoliberal European sense) since the 2008 party election, though he recalled the many meanings of liberal and recalled the left liberalism of the United States Democratic Party, being even called "PSD's Obama" by supporters. Centrists and transversalists inside the party share the think tank Construir Ideias (Building Ideas), which Passos Coelho founded and leads. They mix (like the closely allied centrists) calls to privatization with others to more social justice, government regulation and arbitration and strategic governmental involvement in the economy. This faction is in constant rift with the more socially right-wing ones (who have been leading the party for a long time) and also with the overlappers whose hybrid approach they refuse, over the future of the party and its future ideological and philosophical alignments.

== Election results ==
=== Assembly of the Republic ===
Seat share in the Portuguese legislative elections

Election	Leader	Votes	%	Seats	+/-	Government
1975	Francisco Sá Carneiro	1,507,282	26.4 (#2)	81 / 250		Constituent assembly
1976	Francisco Sá Carneiro	1,335,381	24.4 (#2)	73 / 263	▼8	Opposition
1979	Francisco Sá Carneiro	Democratic Alliance		80 / 250	▲7	Coalition
1980	Francisco Sá Carneiro	Democratic Alliance		82 / 250	▲2	Coalition
1983	Carlos Mota Pinto	1,554,804	27.2 (#2)	75 / 250	▼7	Coalition (Note: Central Bloc government (PS-PSD).)
1985	Aníbal Cavaco Silva	1,732,288	29.9 (#1)	88 / 250	▲13	Minority (Note: Confidence & supply gov't: PSD ⇐ (CDS–PRD).)
1987	Aníbal Cavaco Silva	2,850,784	50.2 (#1)	148 / 250	▲60	Majority
1991	Aníbal Cavaco Silva	2,902,351	50.6 (#1)	135 / 230	▼13	Majority
1995	Fernando Nogueira	2,014,589	34.1 (#2)	88 / 230	▼47	Opposition
1999	José Manuel Durão Barroso	1,750,158	32.3 (#2)	81 / 230	▼7	Opposition
2002	José Manuel Durão Barroso	2,200,765	40.2 (#1)	105 / 230	▲24	Coalition (Note: Coalition government (PSD-CDS–PP).)
2005	Pedro Santana Lopes	1,653,425	28.8 (#2)	71 / 230	▼34	Opposition
2009	Manuela Ferreira Leite	1,653,665	29.1 (#2)	81 / 230	▲10	Opposition
2011	Pedro Passos Coelho	2,159,181	38.7 (#1)	108 / 230	▲27	Coalition (Note: Coalition government (PSD-CDS–PP).)
2015	Pedro Passos Coelho	Portugal Ahead		89 / 230	▼19	Coalition (Note: Minority government (2015); Opposition (2015–2019).)
2015	Pedro Passos Coelho	Portugal Ahead		89 / 230	▼19	Opposition
2019	Rui Rio	1,454,283	27.8 (#2)	79 / 230	▼10	Opposition
2022	Rui Rio	1,618,381	29.1 (#2)	77 / 230	▼2	Opposition
2024	Luís Montenegro	Democratic Alliance		78 / 230	▲1	Coalition (Note: Minority Coalition government (PSD-CDS–PP).)
2025	Luís Montenegro	Democratic Alliance		89 / 230	▲11	Coalition

=== Presidential ===
Election	Candidate	First round		Second round		Result
Election	Candidate	Votes	%	Votes	%	Result
1976	Supported António Ramalho Eanes					Won ✓
1980	António Soares Carneiro	2,325,481	40.2 (#2)			Lost ✗
1986	Supported Diogo Freitas do Amaral					Lost ✗
1991	Supported Mário Soares					Won ✓
1996	Aníbal Cavaco Silva	2,595,131	46.1 (#2)			Lost ✗
2001	Joaquim Ferreira do Amaral	1,498,948	34.7 (#2)			Lost ✗
2006	Aníbal Cavaco Silva	2,773,431	50.5 (#1)			Won ✓
2011	Aníbal Cavaco Silva	2,231,956	53.0 (#1)			Won ✓
2016	Marcelo Rebelo de Sousa	2,413,956	52.0 (#1)			Won ✓
2021	Marcelo Rebelo de Sousa	2,531,692	60.7 (#1)			Won ✓
2026	Luís Marques Mendes	637,442	11.3 (#5)			Lost ✗

=== European Parliament ===
Election	Leader	Votes	%	Seats	+/-	EP Group
1987	Pedro Santana Lopes	2,111,828	37.5 (#1)	10 / 24		LDR
1989	António Capucho	1,358,958	32.8 (#1)	9 / 24	▼1	LDR
1994	Eurico de Melo	1,046,918	34.4 (#2)	9 / 25	0	EPP
1999	José Pacheco Pereira	1,078,528	31.1 (#2)	9 / 25	0	EPP-ED
2004	João de Deus Pinheiro	Forward Portugal		7 / 24	▼2	EPP-ED
2009	Paulo Rangel	1,131,744	31.7 (#1)	8 / 22	▲1	EPP
2014	Paulo Rangel	Portugal Alliance		6 / 21	▼2	EPP
2019	Paulo Rangel	725,399	21.9 (#2)	6 / 21	0	EPP
2024	Sebastião Bugalho	Democratic Alliance		6 / 21	0	EPP

=== Local ===
Results of PSD and PSD-led coalitions. Elected officials from the 1979 and 1982 elections only from PSD sole lists.

Election	Leader	Votes	%	Mayors	+/-	Councillors	+/-	Assemblies	+/-	Parishes	+/-	Parish Assemblies	+/-
1976	Francisco Sá Carneiro	1,012,351	24.3 (#2)	115 / 304		623 / 1,906		1,659 / 5,130		1,255 / 4,035		9,054 / 26,268	
1979	Francisco Sá Carneiro	Democratic Alliance		101 / 305	▼14	480 / 1,937	▼143	2,256 / 9,926	▲597	1,062 / 4,042	▼193	9,631 / 41,199	▲577
1982	Francisco Pinto Balsemão	Democratic Alliance		88 / 305	▼13	442 / 1,949	▼38	2,159 / 10,001	▼97	1,042 / 4,050	▼20	9,585 / 42,199	▼46
1985	Aníbal Cavaco Silva	1,649,560	34.0 (#1)	149 / 305	▲61	822 / 1,981	▲380	2,539 / 6,730	▲380	1,841 / 4,138	▲799	13,117 / 32,016	▲3,532
1989	Aníbal Cavaco Silva	1,745,814	35.3 (#2)	114 / 305	▼35	794 / 1,997	▼28	2,623 / 6,763	▲84	1,716 / 4,207	▼125	13,667 / 33,130	▲550
1993	Aníbal Cavaco Silva	1,822,925	33.7 (#2)	116 / 305	▲2	807 / 2,011	▲13	2,681 / 6,792	▲58	1,661 / 4,220	▼55	13,679 / 33,544	▲12
1997	Marcelo Rebelo de Sousa	1,886,242	35.2 (#2)	127 / 305	▲11	810 / 2,021	▲3	2,601 / 6,807	▼80	1,629 / 4,240	▼32	13,521 / 34,008	▼158
2001	José Manuel Durão Barroso	2,159,707	41.1 (#1)	159 / 308	▲32	906 / 2,044	▲94	2,958 / 6,876	▲357	1,914 / 4,129	▲285	14,839 / 34,569	▲1,318
2005	Luís Marques Mendes	2,151,006	39.9 (#1)	158 / 308	▼1	907 / 2,046	▲1	2,931 / 6,885	▼27	1,998 / 4,125	▲84	15,169 / 34,498	▲330
2009	Manuela Ferreira Leite	2,142,566	38.7 (#1)	139 / 308	▼19	873 / 2,078	▼34	2,799 / 6,946	▼132	1,926 / 4,107	▼72	15,010 / 34,672	▼159
2013	Pedro Passos Coelho	1,570,601	31.4 (#2)	106 / 308	▼33	770 / 2,086	▼103	2,336 / 6,487	▼463	1,231 / 3,085	▼695	10,338 / 27,167	▼4,672
2017	Pedro Passos Coelho	1,569,424	30.3 (#2)	98 / 308	▼8	729 / 2,074	▼41	2,244 / 6,461	▼92	1,165 / 3,083	▼66	10,068 / 27,005	▼270
2021	Rui Rio	1,606,392	32.1 (#2)	114 / 308	▲16	793 / 2,064	▲64	2,359 / 6,448	▲115	1,203 / 3,066	▲38	10,291 / 26,790	▲223
2025	Luís Montenegro	1,891,453	34.3 (#1)	136 / 308	▲22	831 / 2,058	▲38	2,448 / 6,464	▲89	1,450 / 3,221	▲247	11,615 / 27,997	▲1,324

=== Regional assemblies ===
Region	Election	Leader	Votes	%	Seats	+/-	Government
Azores	2024	José Manuel Bolieiro	PSD/CDS/PPM		23 / 57	▲2	Coalition (Note: Minority coalition government PSD-CDS–PP-PPM)
Madeira	2025	Miguel Albuquerque	62,059	43.4 (#1)	23 / 47	▲4	Coalition (Note: Coalition government (PSD-CDS–PP).)

== Organization ==
=== Party leaders ===
==== List of leaders ====
	Leader (Note: Leaders until 31 October 1976 had the title of General-Secretary, which from then on became the title of the second-in-command, with the leader's title being the one of President.)	From	To
1st	Francisco Sá Carneiro	24 November 1974	25 May 1975
2nd	Emídio Guerreiro	25 May 1975	28 September 1975
—	Francisco Sá Carneiro (2nd time)	28 September 1975	11 November 1977
3rd	António de Sousa Franco	11 November 1977	15 April 1978
4th	José Menéres Pimentel	15 April 1978	2 July 1978
—	Francisco Sá Carneiro (3rd time)	2 July 1978	4 December 1980
5th	Francisco Pinto Balsemão	13 December 1980	27 February 1983
6th	Nuno Rodrigues dos Santos	27 February 1983	25 March 1984
7th	Carlos Mota Pinto	25 March 1984	10 February 1985
8th	Rui Machete	10 February 1985	19 May 1985
9th	Aníbal Cavaco Silva	19 May 1985	19 February 1995
10th	Fernando Nogueira	19 February 1995	31 March 1996
11th	Marcelo Rebelo de Sousa	31 March 1996	1 May 1999
12th	José Manuel Durão Barroso	2 May 1999	30 June 2004
13th	Pedro Santana Lopes	30 June 2004	10 April 2005
14th	Luís Marques Mendes	8 April 2005	12 October 2007
15th	Luís Filipe Menezes	12 October 2007	20 June 2008
16th	Manuela Ferreira Leite	20 June 2008	9 April 2010
17th	Pedro Passos Coelho	9 April 2010	16 February 2018
18th	Rui Rio	16 February 2018	1 July 2022
19th	Luís Montenegro	1 July 2022	Incumbent

==== Graphical timeline ====
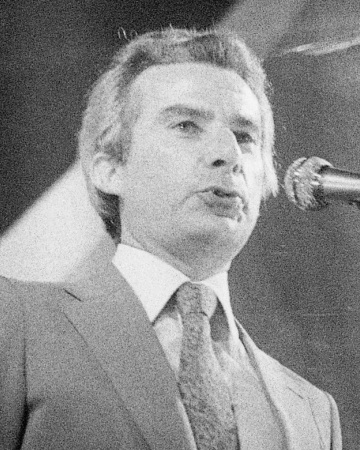
Francisco Sá Carneiro, founder, party's secretary-general and president (1974–1975; 1975–1977; 1978–1980) and prime minister (1980)

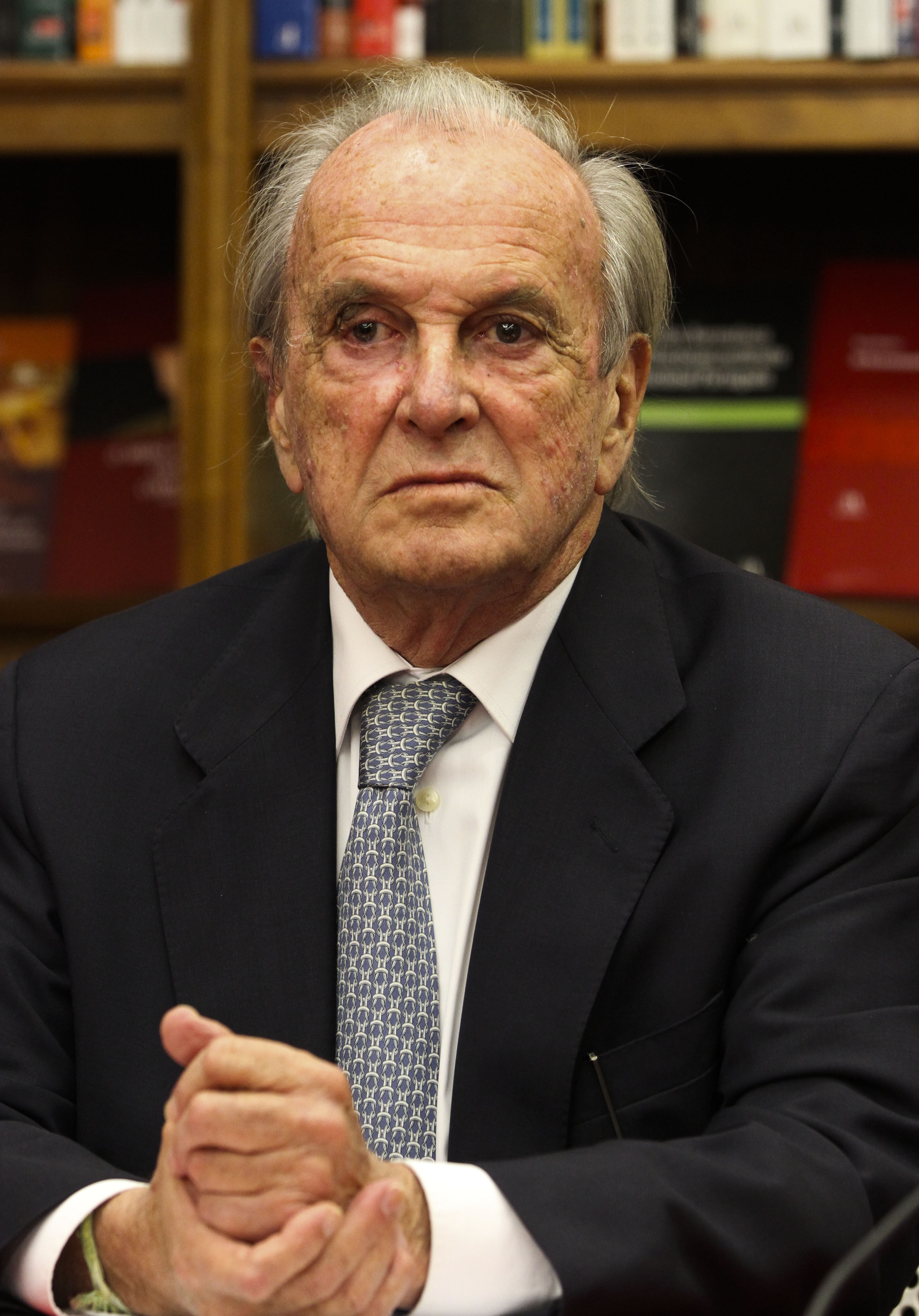
Francisco Pinto Balsemão, party's president (1980–1983) and prime minister (1981–1983)

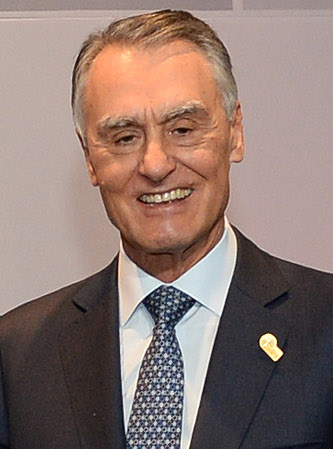
Aníbal Cavaco Silva, party's president (1985–1995), prime minister (1985–1995) and president of the Republic (2006–2016)

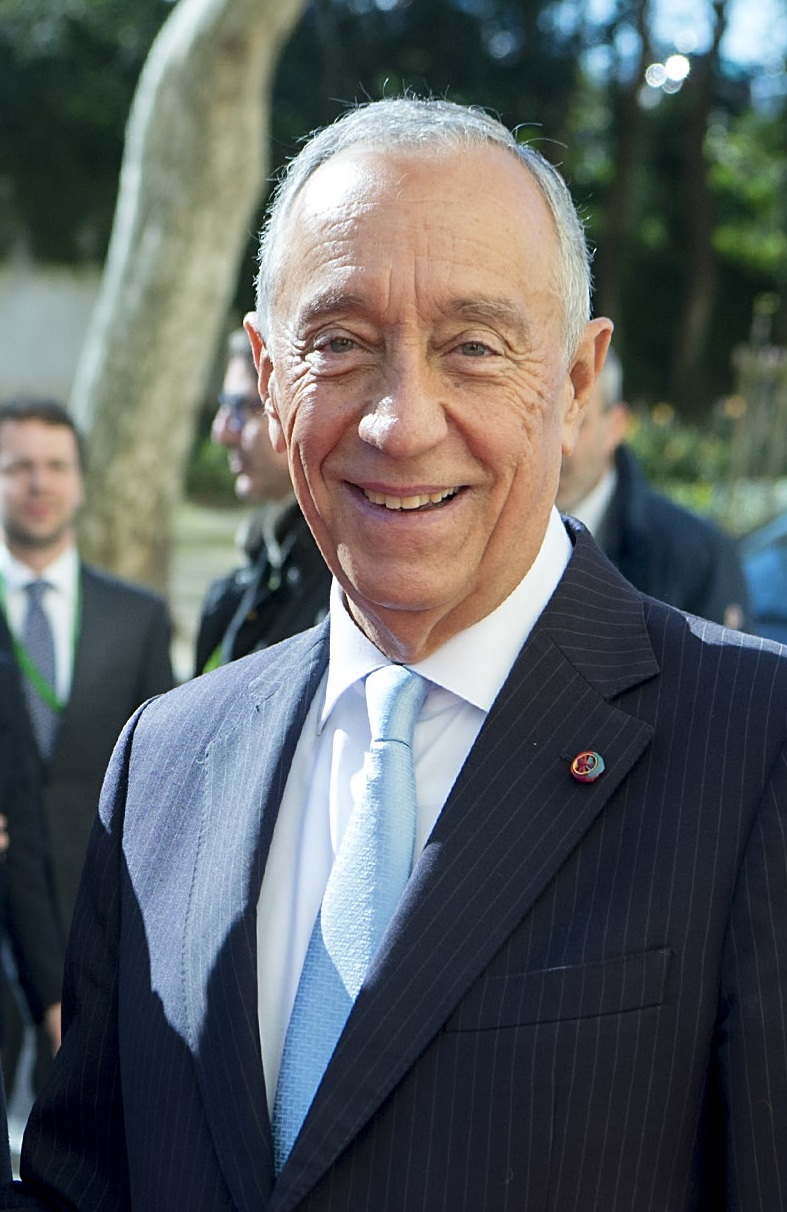
Marcelo Rebelo de Sousa, party's president (1996–1999) and president of the Republic (2016–2026)

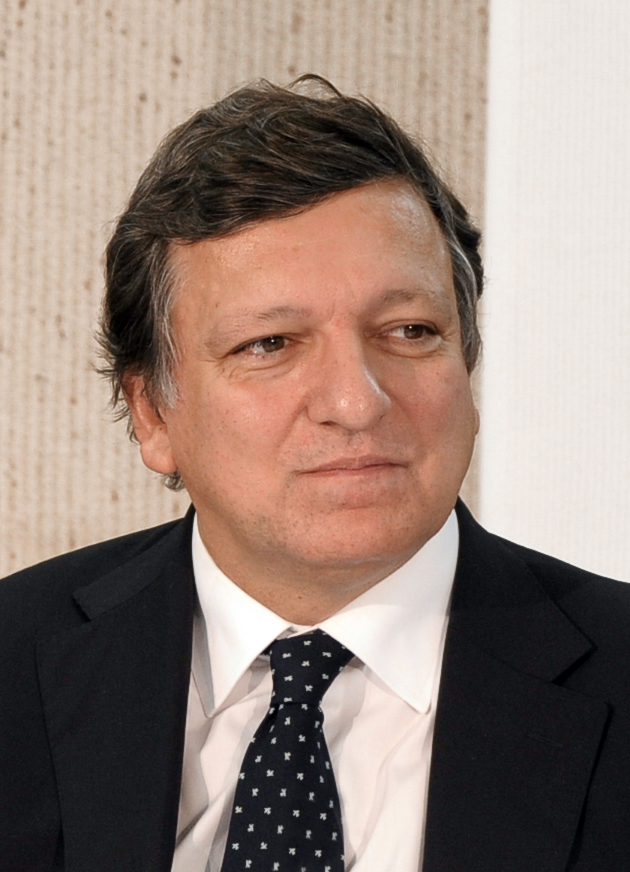
José Manuel Durão Barroso, party's president (1999–2004), prime minister (2002–2004) and president of the European Commission (2004–2014)

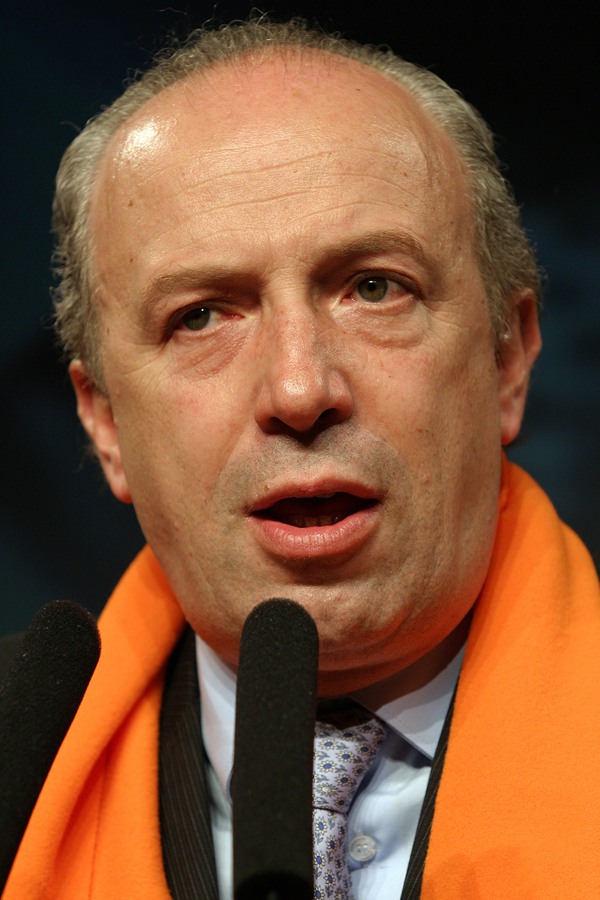
Pedro Santana Lopes, party's president (2004–2005) and prime minister (2004–2005)

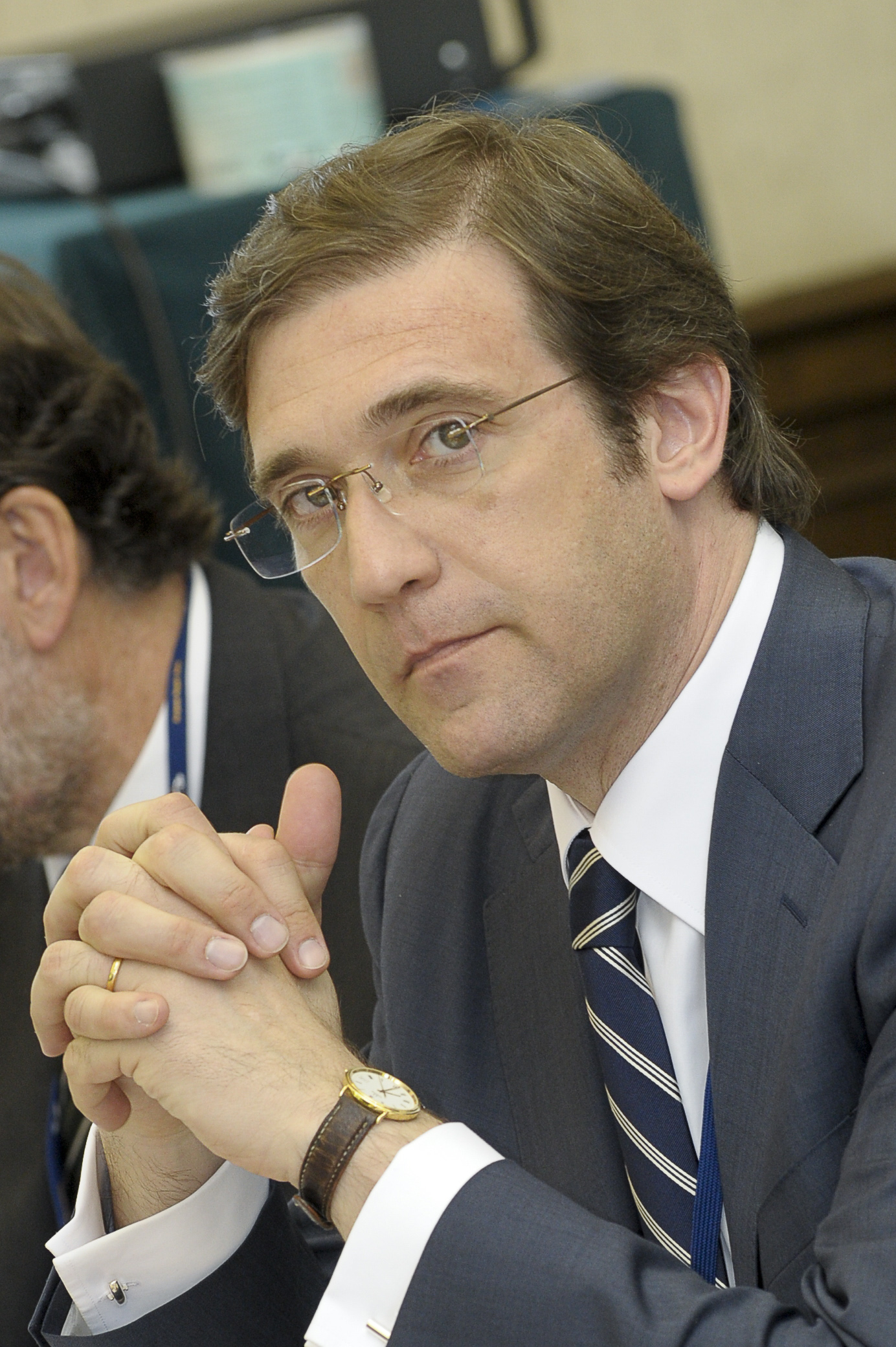
Pedro Passos Coelho, party's president (2010–2018) and prime minister (2011–2015)

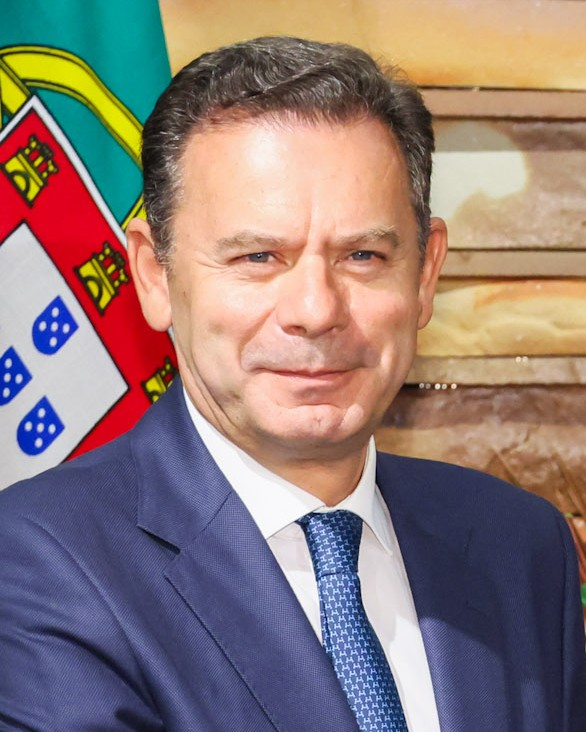
Luís Montenegro, party's president (since 2022) and prime minister (since 2024)

=== List of secretaries-general (second-in-command) ===
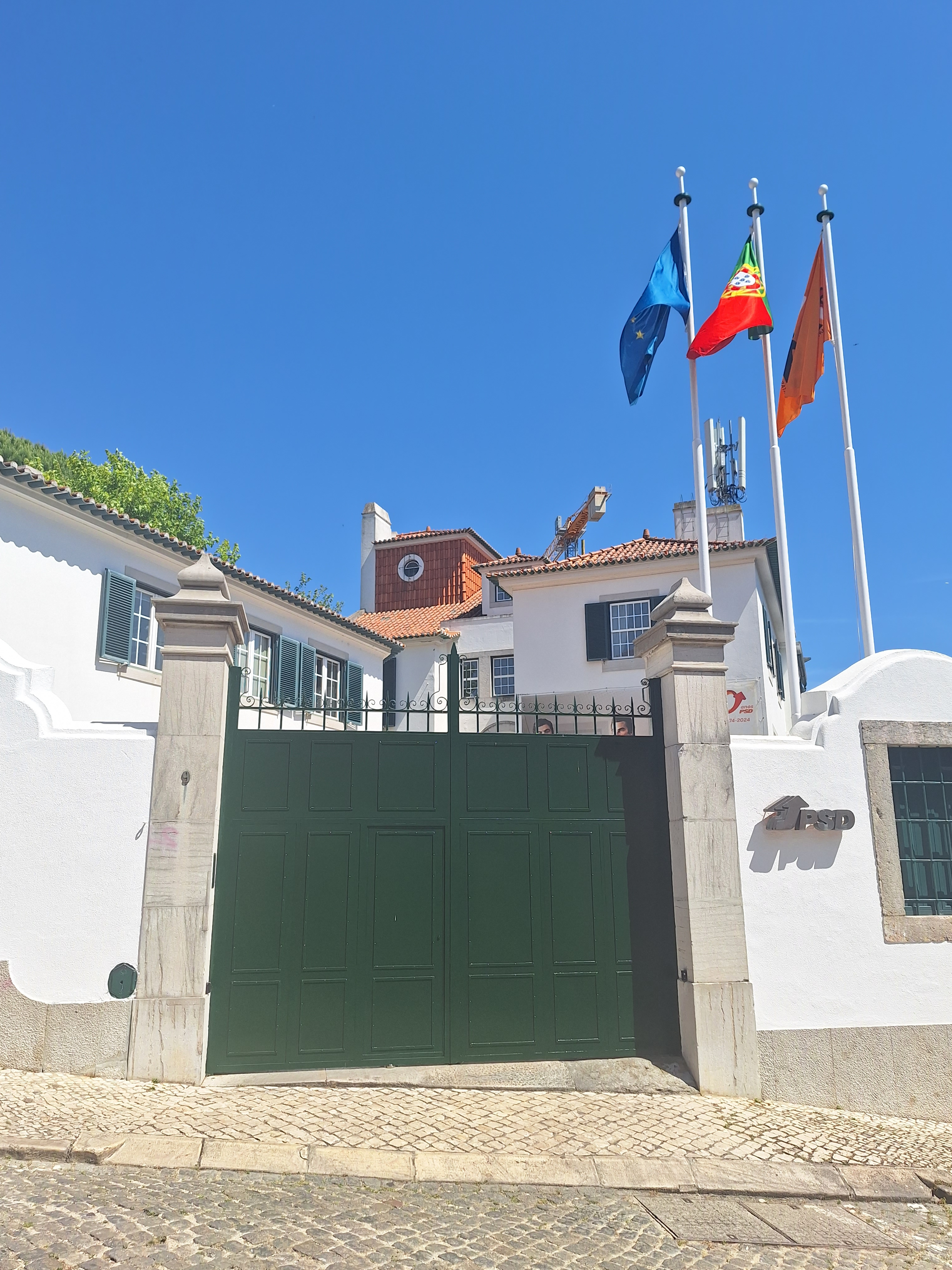
National headquarters of the Social Democratic Party in S. Caetano à Lapa street, Estrela, Lisbon

- Joaquim Magalhães Mota (31 October 1976 – 29 January 1978; as president)
- Sérvulo Correia (29 January 1978 – 2 July 1978; as president)
- Amândio de Azevedo (2 July 1978 – 17 June 1979; as president)
- António Capucho (17 June 1979 – 25 March 1984; as president until 27 February 1983)
- Francisco Antunes da Silva (25 March 1984 – 19 May 1985)
- Manuel Dias Loureiro (19 May 1985 – 8 April 1990)
- José Falcão e Cunha (8 April 1990 – 15 November 1992)
- José Nunes Liberato (15 November 1992 – 19 February 1995)
- Eduardo Azevedo Soares (19 February 1995 – 31 March 1996)
- Rui Rio (31 March 1996 – 20 June 1997)
- Carlos Horta e Costa (20 June 1997 – 19 April 1998)
- António Capucho (19 April 1998 – 17 January 1999)
- Artur Torres Pereira (17 January 1999 – 2 May 1999)
- José Luís Arnaut (2 May 1999 – 23 May 2004)
- Miguel Relvas (23 May 2004 – 10 April 2005)
- Miguel Macedo (10 April 2005 – 14 October 2007)
- José Ribau Esteves (14 October 2007 – 22 June 2008)
- Luís Marques Guedes (22 June 2008 – 11 October 2010)
- Miguel Relvas (11 April 2010 – 12 June 2011)
- José Matos Rosa (12 June 2011 – 18 February 2018)
- Feliciano Barreiras Duarte (18 February 2018 – 19 March 2018)
- José Silvano (19 March 2018 – 3 July 2022)
- Hugo Soares (3 July 2022 – present)

=== List of Parliamentary leaders ===
- Carlos Mota Pinto (17 May 1975 – 13 January 1976)
- António Barbosa de Melo (1st time) (13 January 1976 – 9 June 1976)
- Francisco Sá Carneiro (1st time) (9 June 1976 – 11 November 1976)
- Afonso Moura Guedes (1st time) (24 November 1976 – 6 December 1977)
- António Barbosa de Melo (2nd time) (6 December 1977 – 1 March 1978)
- Joaquim Magalhães Mota (1 March 1978 – 20 April 1978)
- José Menéres Pimentel (20 April 1978 – 20 March 1979)
- Francisco Sá Carneiro (2nd time) (20 March 1979 – 16 January 1980)
- Pedro Roseta (3 April 1980 – 4 July 1981)
- Afonso Moura Guedes (2nd time) (4 July 1981 – 19 January 1982)
- Manuel Pereira (19 January 1982 – 28 October 1982)
- Vítor Pereira Crespo (28 October 1982 – 3 November 1983)
- Fernando Condesso (3 November 1983 – 16 October 1984)
- António d'Orey Capucho (1st time) (16 October 1984 – 27 August 1987)
- Fernando Correia Afonso (27 August 1987 – 28 October 1988)
- Mário Júlio Montalvão Machado (28 October 1988 – 28 November 1992)
- Domingos Duarte Lima (28 November 1992 – 7 January 1995)
- José Pacheco Pereira (7 January 1995 – 21 April 1995)
- José Augusto da Silva Marques (21 April 1995 – 3 November 1995)
- Fernando Nogueira (3 November 1995 – 6 November 1996)
- Luís Marques Mendes (6 November 1996 – 3 November 1999)
- António d'Orey Capucho (2nd time) (3 November 1999 – 27 September 2001)
- Manuela Ferreira Leite (27 September 2001 – 9 April 2002)
- Guilherme Silva (9 April 2002 – 21 April 2005)
- Luís Marques Guedes (21 April 2005 – 18 October 2007)
- Pedro Santana Lopes (18 October 2007 – 26 June 2008)
- Paulo Rangel (26 June 2008 – 13 July 2009)
- António Montalvão Machado (13 July 2009 – 22 October 2009)
- José Pedro Aguiar-Branco (22 October 2009 – 15 April 2010)
- Miguel Macedo (15 April 2010 – 26 June 2011)
- Luís Montenegro (26 June 2011 – 19 July 2017)
- Hugo Soares (1st time) (19 July 2017 – 22 February 2018)
- Fernando Negrão (22 February 2018 – 4 November 2019)
- Rui Rio (4 November 2019 – 17 September 2020)
- Adão Silva (17 September 2020 – 7 April 2022)
- Paulo Mota Pinto (7 April 2022 – 13 July 2022)
- Joaquim Miranda Sarmento (13 July 2022 – 9 April 2024)
- Hugo Soares (2nd time) (9 April 2024 – present)

=== Prime ministers ===
- Francisco Sá Carneiro: 1979–1980
- Francisco Pinto Balsemão: 1981–1983
- Aníbal Cavaco Silva: 1985–1995
- José Manuel Durão Barroso: 2002–2004
- Pedro Santana Lopes: 2004–2005
- Pedro Passos Coelho: 2011–2015
- Luís Montenegro: 2024–present

=== Presidents of the Republic ===
- Aníbal Cavaco Silva: 2006–2016
- Marcelo Rebelo de Sousa: 2016–2026

=== Symbols ===
==== Logos ====
The orange color is dominant in the PSD symbols and flags since 1974 and the logo is characterized by three arrows, inspired in the Three Arrows political symbol from the German Social Democratic Party during the 1930s against Nazism. In the PSD logo, the three arrows represent freedom, equality and solidarity - a traditional social democratic motto, with its roots in the French Revolution.

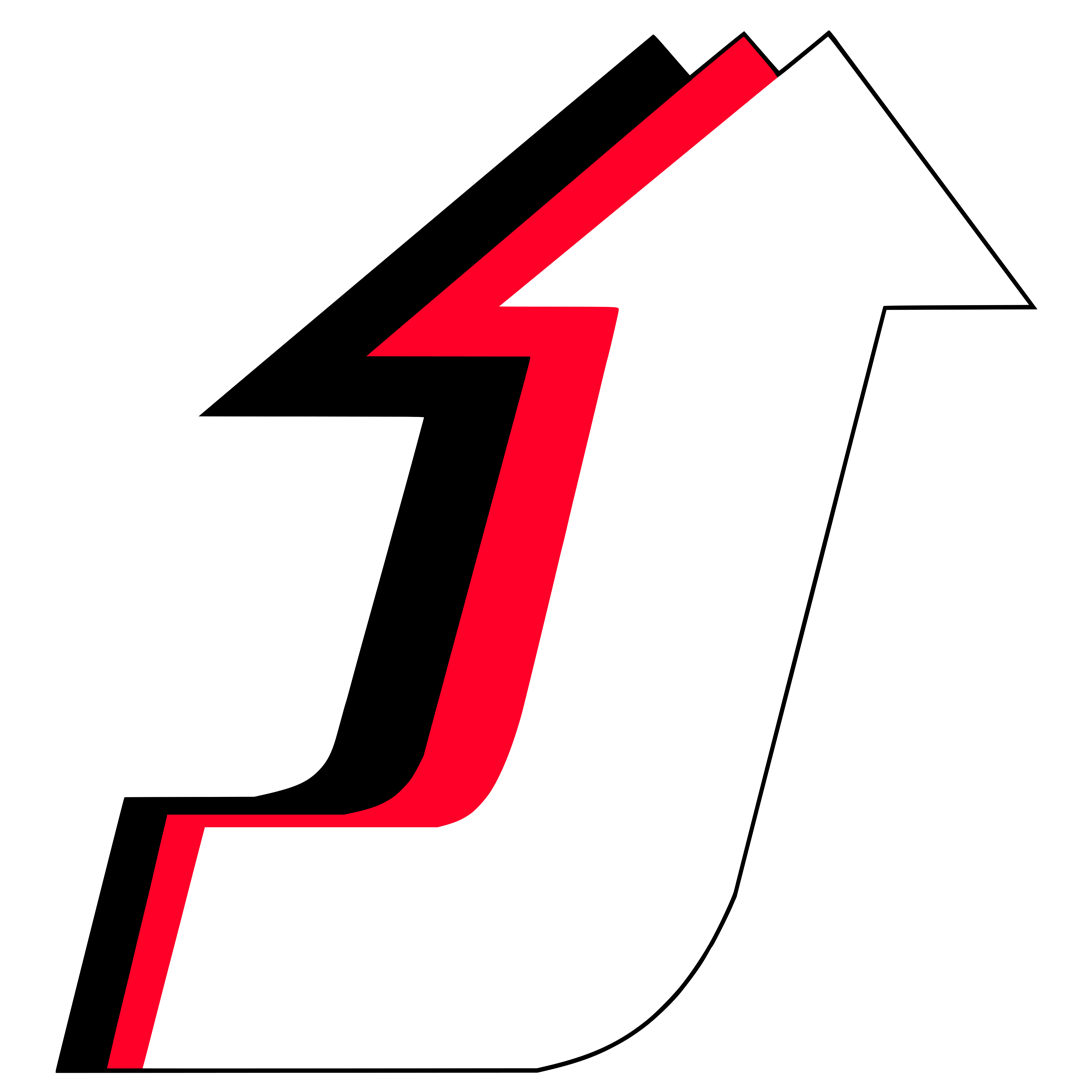
Party logo, 1974–1987

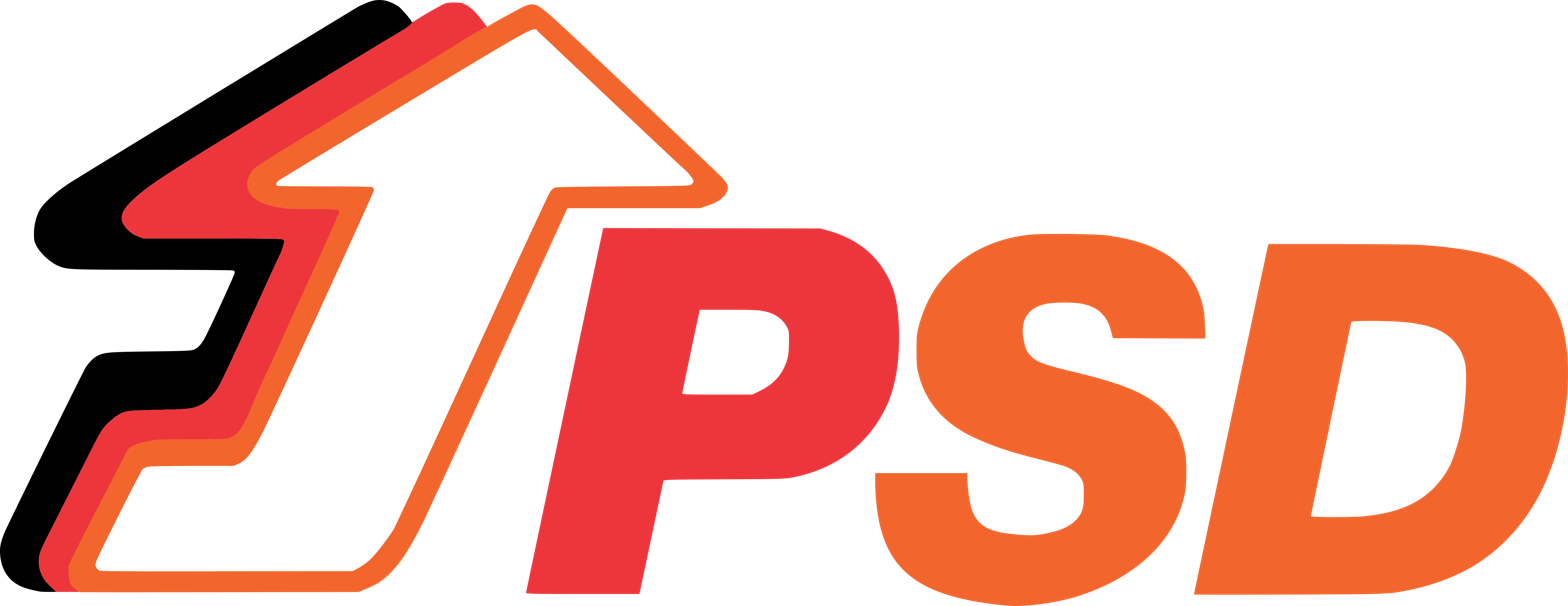
Party logo, 1987–1996

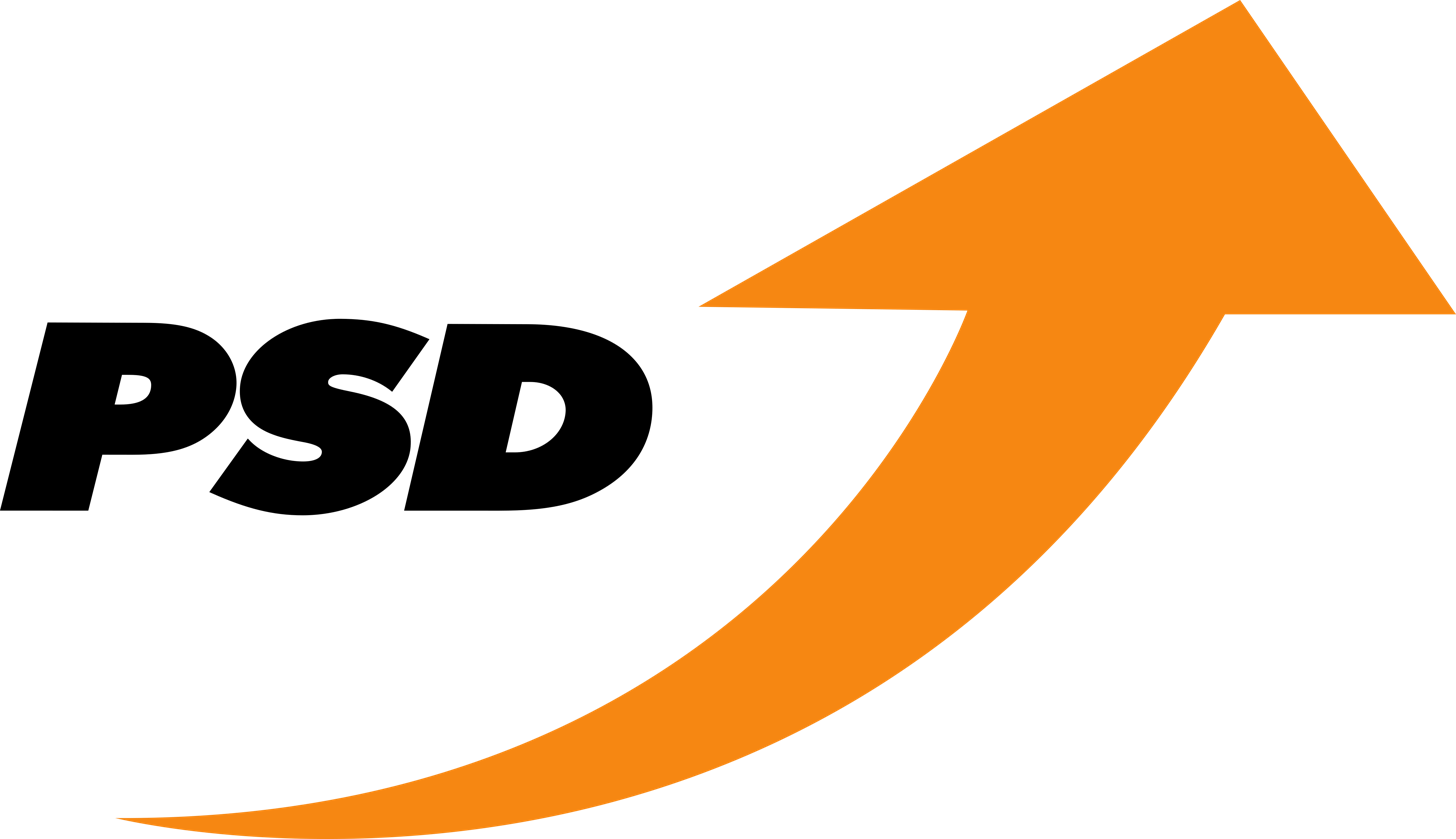
Party logo, 1999–2008

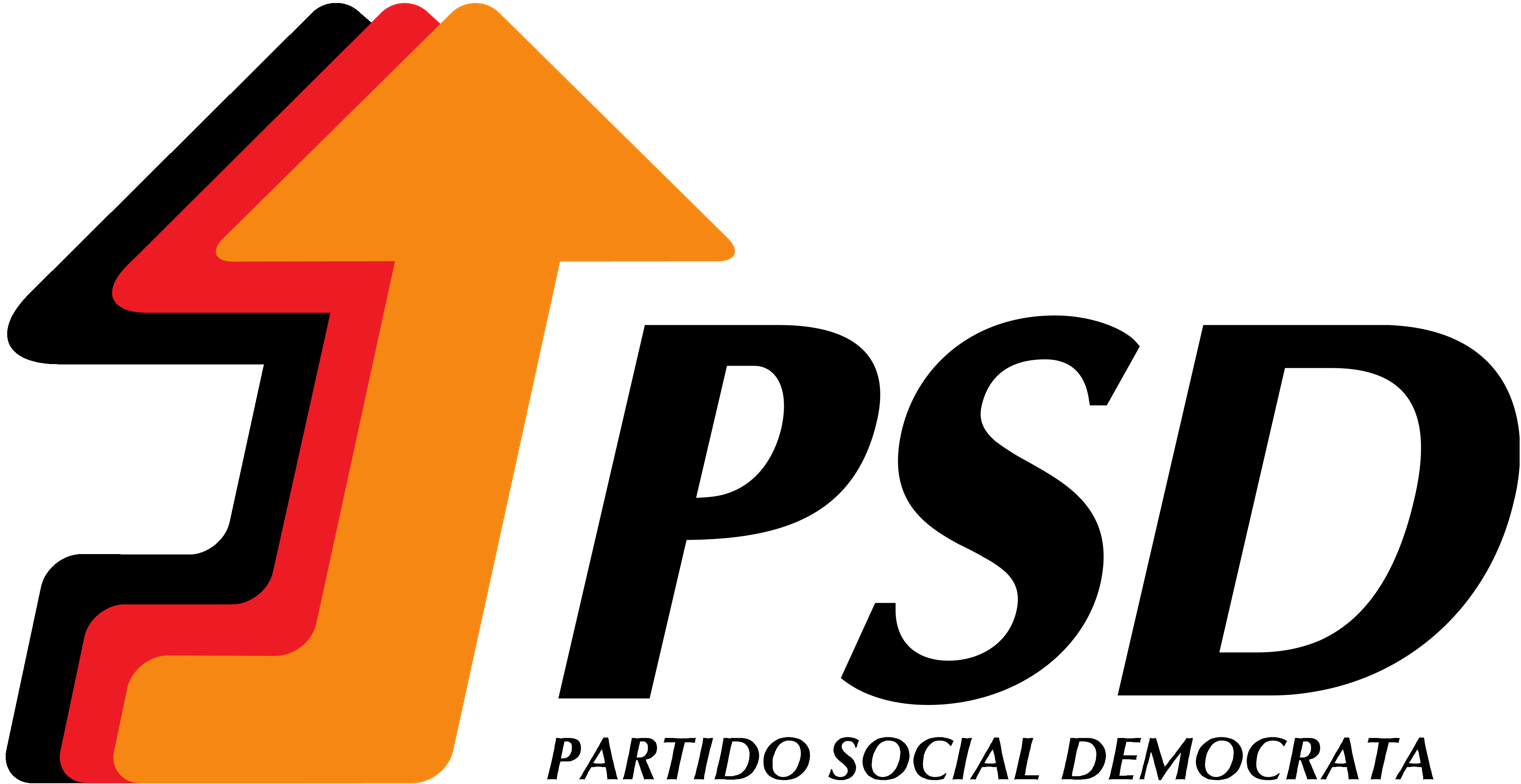
Party logo, 1997–1999, 2008–2011

Current logo, since 2011

== See also ==
- Politics of Portugal
- List of political parties in Portugal
