= List of political parties in Portugal =

This article lists political parties in Portugal. The Portuguese political scene has been dominated by the Socialist Party and the Social Democratic Party since the 1974 Carnation Revolution although there are several important minor parties (discussed below).

As of 2025, the parties represented in the Assembly of the Republic are those elected by the Democratic Alliance (91 MPs, in which PPD/PSD has 89 seats and CDS–PP has 2 seats), Chega (60 MPs), the Socialist Party (58 MPs), the Liberal Initiative (9 MPs), LIVRE (6 MPs), the Portuguese Communist Party (3 MPs), the Left Bloc (1 MP), the People-Animals-Nature party (1 MP), and the Together for the People party (1 MP). One other party is represented in the legislature of one of the autonomous regions, the Legislative Assembly of the Azores.

By 2026, there are 24 legally and active registered parties with the Constitutional Court.

== National political parties ==
=== Parties represented in the Assembly of the Republic and/or the European Parliament ===
Party		Ideology	Position	European party	EP group	Leader	MPs	MEPs	Ref.
PPD/PSD	Social Democratic Party; Partido Social Democrata	Liberal conservatism; Pro-Europeanism	Centre-right	EPP	EPP	Luís Montenegro	89 / 230	6 / 21	
CH	Enough; Chega	Right-wing populism; National conservatism; Social conservatism; Euroscepticism	Far-right	Patriots.eu	PfE	André Ventura	60 / 230	2 / 21	
PS	Socialist Party; Partido Socialista	Social democracy; Pro-Europeanism	Centre-left	PES	S&D	José Luís Carneiro	58 / 230	8 / 21	
IL	Liberal Initiative; Iniciativa Liberal	Classical liberalism; Libertarianism	Centre-right to right-wing	ALDE	RE	Mariana Leitão	9 / 230	2 / 21	
L	FREE; LIVRE	Green politics; Libertarian socialism	Centre-left to left-wing	EGP	No MEPs; previously G/EFA	Isabel Mendes Lopes; Jorge Pinto	6 / 230	0 / 21	
PCP	Portuguese Communist Party; Partido Comunista Português	Communism; Marxism–Leninism; Euroscepticism	Far-left	—N/a	GUE-NGL	Paulo Raimundo	3 / 230	1 / 21	
CDS–PP	CDS – People's Party; CDS – Partido Popular	Christian democracy; Conservatism	Right-wing	EPP	EPP	Nuno Melo	2 / 230	1 / 21	
BE	Left Bloc; Bloco de Esquerda	Democratic socialism; Eco-socialism; Anti-capitalism; Left-wing populism	Left-wing to far-left	ELA; NTP	GUE-NGL	José Manuel Pureza	1 / 230	1 / 21	
PAN	People Animals Nature; Pessoas-Animais-Natureza	Environmentalism; Animal rights	Centre to centre-left (Note: Some sources state that People Animals Nature (PAN) is neither on the left nor the right.)	APEU; EGP	No MEPs; previously G/EFA	Inês Sousa Real	1 / 230	0 / 21	
JPP	Together for the People; Juntos Pelo Povo	Regionalism; Social liberalism	Centre	EDP	—N/a	Élvio Sousa	1 / 230	0 / 21	

=== Parties without representation in the Assembly of the Republic or the European Parliament ===
Party		Ideology	Position	European Party	European Group	Leader	Ref.
PEV	Ecologist Party "The Greens"; Partido Ecologista "Os Verdes"	Eco-socialism; Green politics; Euroscepticism	Left-wing	EGP	No MEPs; previously G/EFA	Collective leadership	
ADN	National Democratic Alternative; Alternativa Democrática Nacional	Social conservatism; Portuguese nationalism; Climate change denialism	Far-right	ECPM (candidate)	—N/a	Bruno Fialho	
RIR	React, Include, Recycle; Reagir, Incluir, Reciclar	Humanism; Pacifism; Pro-Europeanism; Radical centrism	Syncretic	None	—N/a	Márcia Henriques	
VP	Volt Portugal; Volt Portugal	Pro-Europeanism; European federalism; Social liberalism	Centre to centre-left	Volt	—N/a	Catarina Silva Marques; Pedro Pessoa	
PCTP/MRPP	Portuguese Workers' Communist Party; Partido Comunista dos Trabalhadores Portugueses	Anti-revisionism; Marxism-Leninism; Maoism	Far-left	None	—N/a	Maria Cidália Guerreiro	
ND	New Right; Nova Direita	National conservatism; Economic liberalism; Populism	Right-wing	None	—N/a	Ossanda Liber	
PLS	Liberal Social Party; Partido Liberal Social	Liberalism; Social liberalism	Centre to Centre-right	None	—N/a	José Cardoso	
PPM	People's Monarchist Party; Partido Popular Monárquico	Constitutional monarchism; Conservatism; Christian democracy; Euroscepticism	Right-wing	ECPM	—N/a	Gonçalo da Câmara Pereira	
NC	We, the Citizens! Nós, Cidadãos!	Liberalism; Direct democracy	Centre-right	None	—N/a	Joaquim Rocha Afonso	
MPT	Earth Party; Partido da Terra	Green conservatism; Liberalism	Centre-right	None	No MEPs; previously EPP	Pedro Soares Pimenta	
PTP	Portuguese Labour Party; Partido Trabalhista Português	Democratic socialism; Pro-Europeanism; Social democracy	Left-wing	None	—N/a	Raquel Coelho	
MAS	Socialist Alternative Movement; Movimento Alternativa Socialista	Trotskyism; Socialism	Far-left	None	—N/a	Gil Garcia	
A)T	(A)TUA	Pensioners' rights; Populism; Anti-austerity	Syncretic	None	—N/a	Rui Lima	
TU	Workers United; Trabalhadores Unidos	Revolutionary socialism Trotskyism	Far-left	None	—N/a	Renata Cambra	

== General overview ==
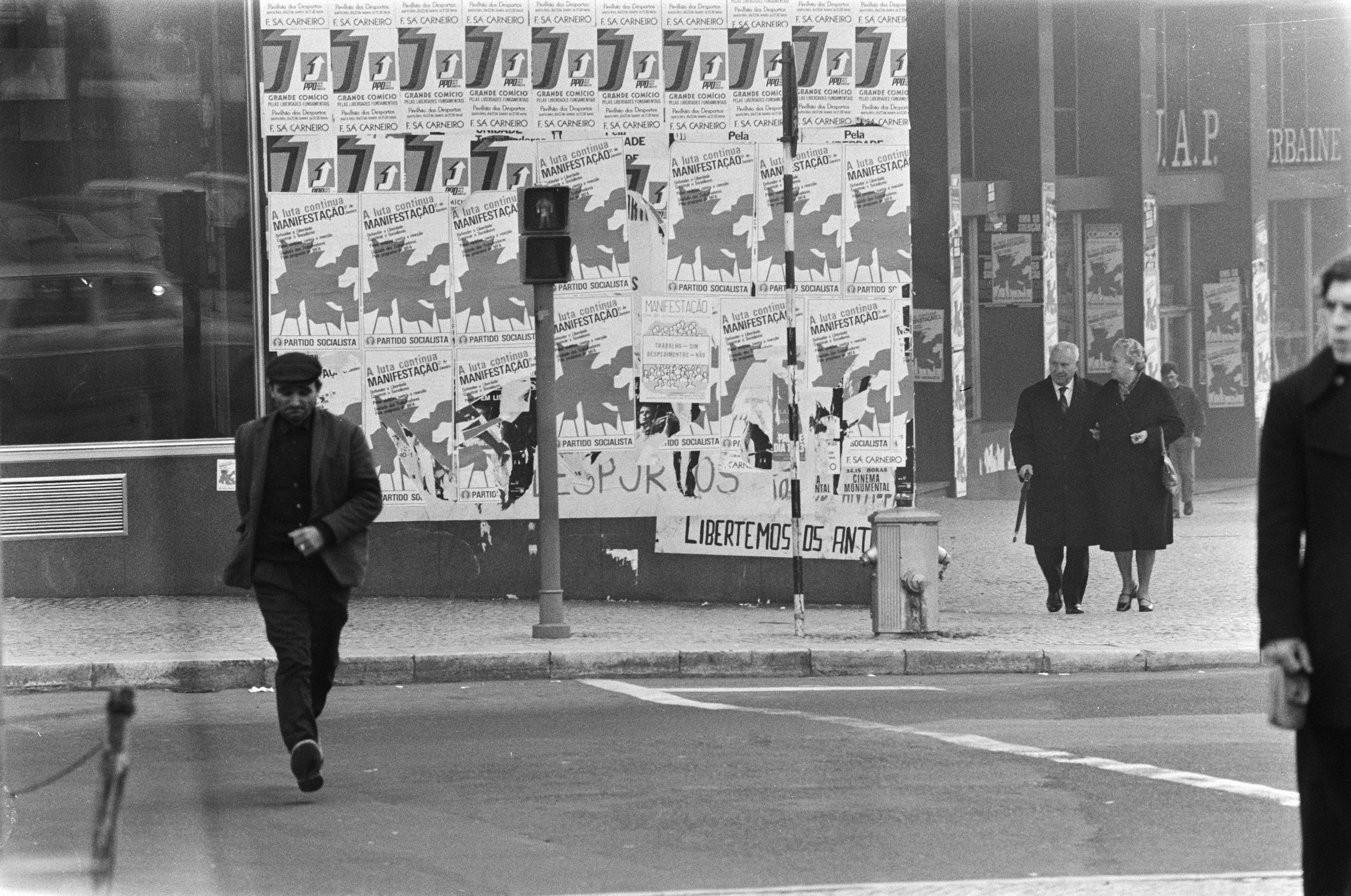
Political posters in 1975.

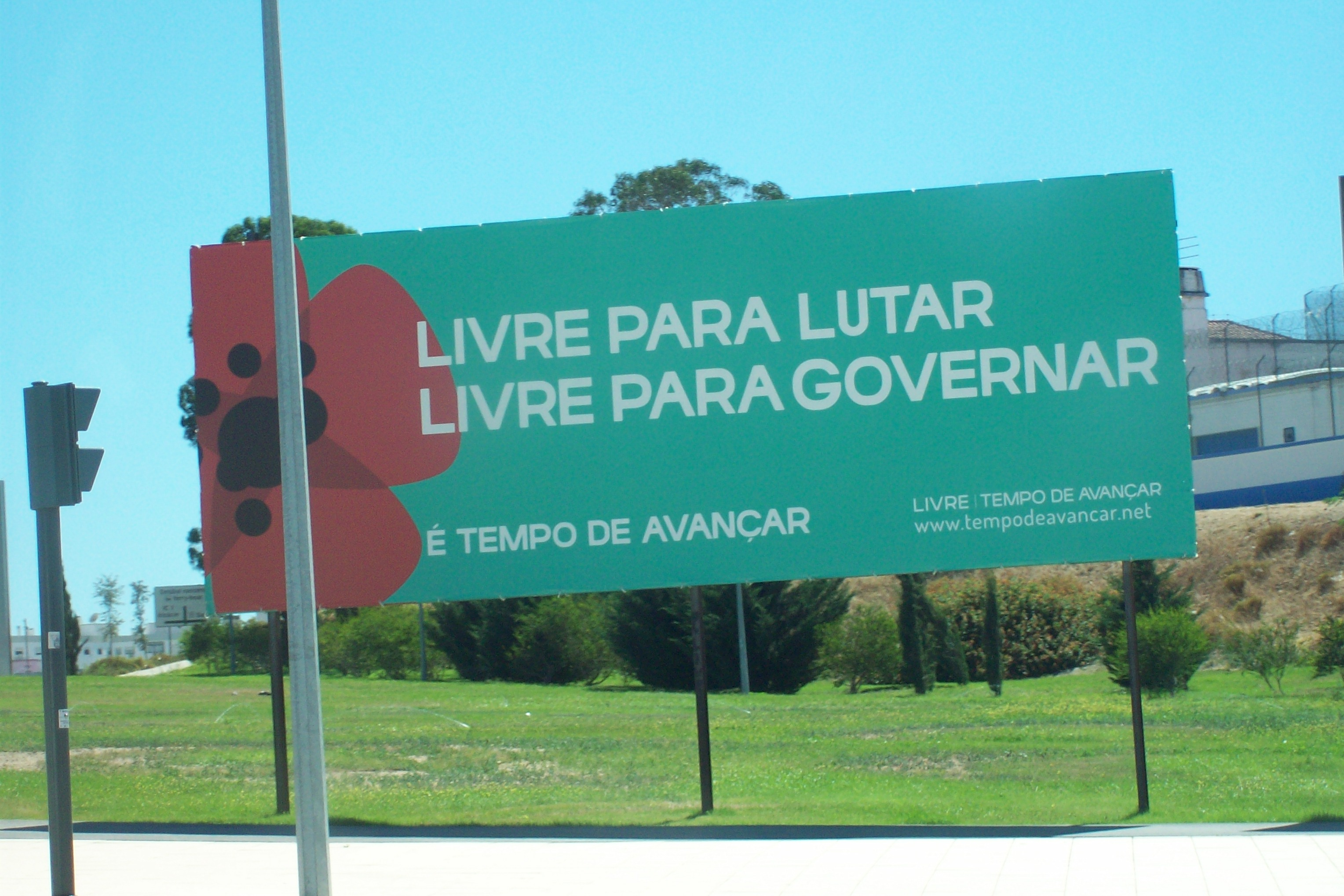
Livre campaign poster for the 2015 legislative election.

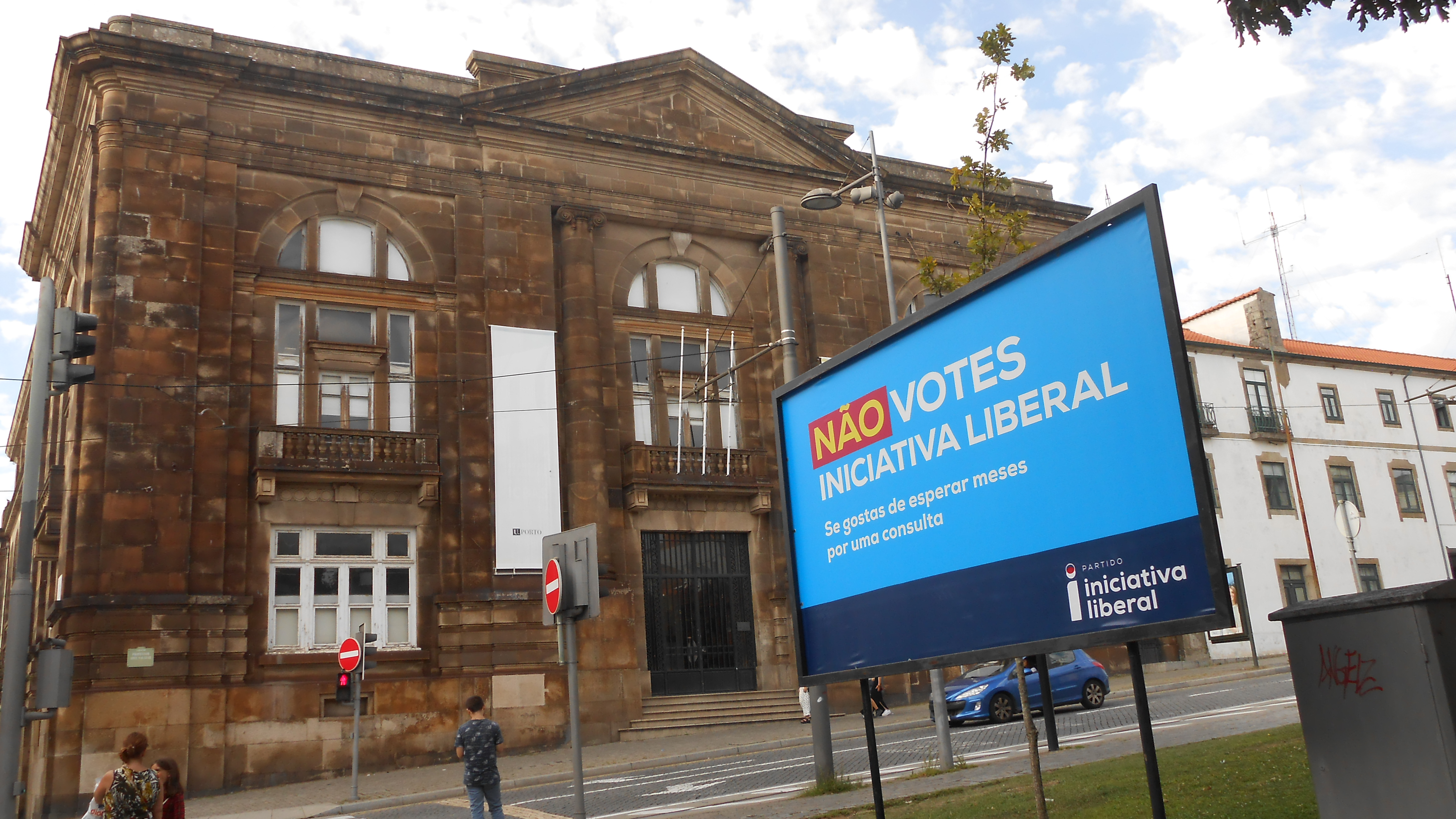
Liberal Initiative campaign poster for the 2019 legislative election.

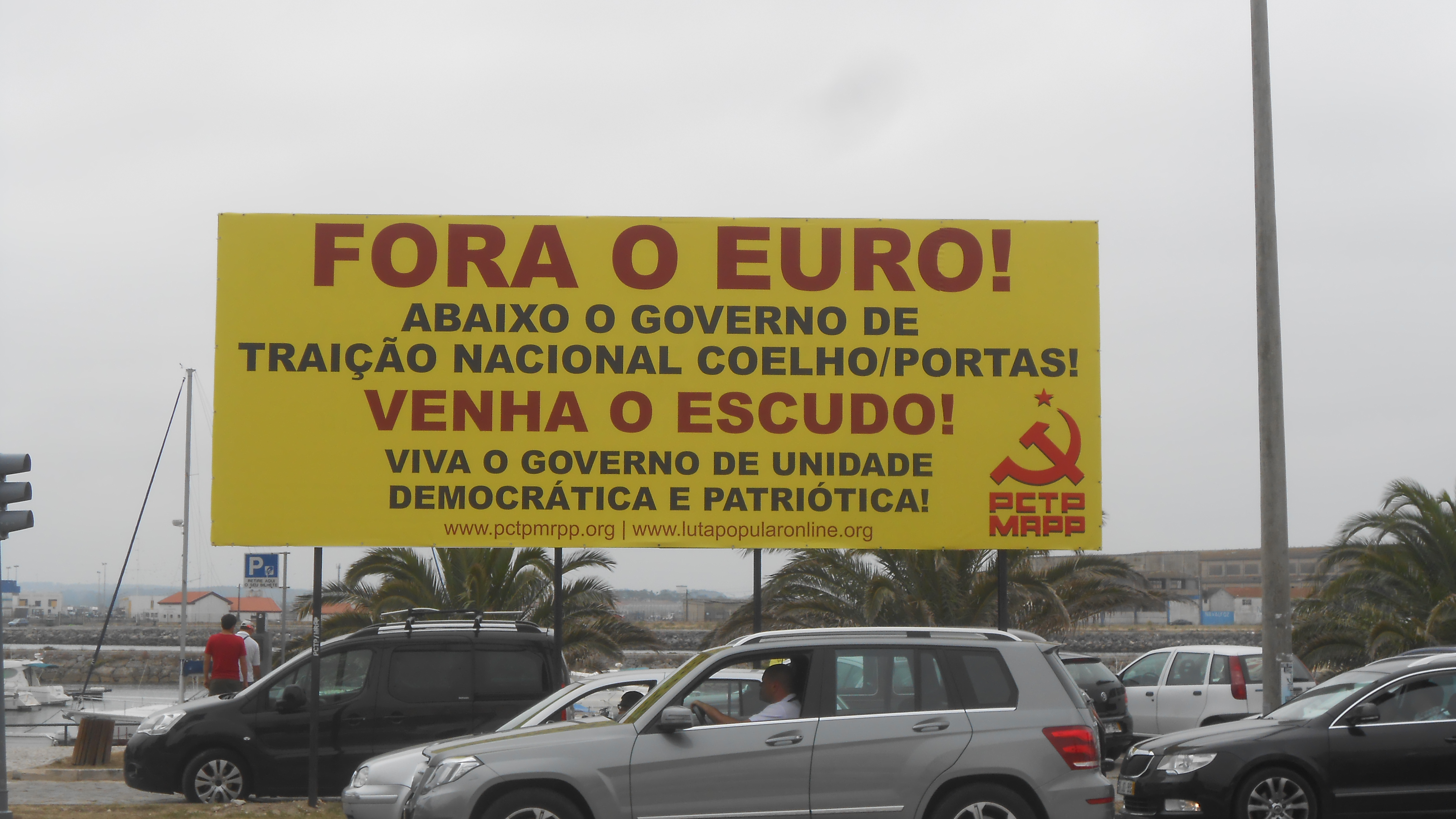
PCTP/MRPP campaign poster in 2014.

This list presents all the existing parties recognized by the Portuguese Constitutional Court.

- The Social Democratic Party (PPD/PSD), despite the name, is not a traditional social democratic party, being much closer to the centre-right. A big tent party, it is the equivalent of any other liberal conservative party in Europe such as the French Republicans or the German CDU. The PSD was founded right after the 1974 Revolution as Partido Popular Democrático (Democratic People's Party) by many personalities of the so-called "liberal wing" of the fascist regime, like Francisco Sá Carneiro (the PSD historical leader), Francisco Pinto Balsemão, and Joaquim Magalhães Mota. Its leader, Luís Montenegro, is the current Prime Minister of Portugal.
- The Socialist Party (PS), a social democratic party, is a major party in Portugal, resembling the British Labour Party, the German SPD or the Spanish PSOE. The party was founded before the 1974 Revolution by (among others) Mário Soares, its historical leader and one of the main opponents of the dictatorial regime. The current Secretary-General of the United Nations António Guterres is a former leader and Prime Minister and the current President of Portugal, António José Seguro, is a former leader.
- Chega (CH) is a Portuguese national conservative, right-wing populist party founded by PSD dissident André Ventura, similar to the French National Rally, or the Spanish Vox.
- The Liberal Initiative (IL) is a classical liberal and right-libertarian party, which advocates for capitalism and social liberalism, similar to the German FDP.
- LIVRE (L) is a green political, ecosocialist, and pro-European party.
- The Portuguese Communist Party (PCP), founded in 1921 as the Portuguese Section of the Communist International, has its major influence among the working class and played a major role in the opposition to the Estado Novo regime, being brutally repressed in the process. After being one of the most influential parties in the years that followed the Carnation Revolution, it lost most of its power base after the fall of the Eastern Bloc, but still enjoys popularity in some sectors of Portuguese society. It also has a major influence among the biggest Portuguese labour union – General Confederation of the Portuguese Workers (CGTP). Its historical leader was Álvaro Cunhal.
- The CDS – People's Party (CDS–PP) is a traditional Christian Democrat and conservative party, similar to the German CSU or the Spanish PP. Founded after the revolution, its historical leaders were Diogo Freitas do Amaral and Adelino Amaro da Costa. In 1976 it was the only party that voted against approval of a socialist constitution. Later, it was part of several governments in coalition with the PSD. The CDS congregates several right-wing tendencies ranging from christian democrats to neoliberals and more conservative elements.
- The Left Bloc (BE), formed as a result of the merger of three left-wing parties (the Popular Democratic Union, the Revolutionary Socialist Party, and Politics XXI), is an mostly urban party, adopting a wide range of left-wing policies and portrays itself as the modern, progressive alternative to the Portuguese Communist Party.
- People-Animals-Nature (PAN) is a party inspired by environmentalism and strongly focused on the rights of animals and animal welfare and which considers itself to be socially progressive, defending LGBT rights and women's rights.
- Together for the People (JPP) was formed as an independent movement for the local elections of 2013 in the municipally of Santa Cruz in Madeira. Transformed into a political party in 2015 in order to contest the regional elections in Madeira.
- The Ecologist Party "The Greens" (PEV) is the first Portuguese green party, traditionally allied with the Communist Party in the Unitary Democratic Coalition.
- The National Democratic Alternative (ADN) was founded by the former leader of the Portuguese Bar Association, António Marinho e Pinto. He ran as the Earth Party candidate for the 2014 European elections but left the party soon after to form PDR (later ADN). A populist party, after Marinho e Pinto left it eventually became COVID-19 denialist and anti-environmentalist, defending a reform of the electoral system and reform of justice system.
- React, Include, Recycle (RIR) is a humanist, pacifist and universalist party ("Rir" in Portuguese means "laughing").
- Volt Portugal (VP), portuguese chapter of Volt Europa, is a pro-European and European federalist political movement. The organisation follows a "pan-European approach" in many policy fields such as climate change, migration, economic inequality, international conflict, terrorism and the impact of the technological revolution on the labour market. It identifies itself as a pan-European, progressive, social-liberal and environmentalist political party.
- The Portuguese Workers' Communist Party (PCTP/MRPP) is a Maoist party. It had a high-profile during the Carnation Revolution, mostly due to its influence among some groups of students, although it never reached 2% of the votes or elected a single MP.
- The New Right (ND) is a party created by Ossanda Liber, a former candidate for mayor of Lisbon and a former member of Alliance that created a right-wing conservative party that is looking to occupy the place of CDS–PP in national politics after they left parliament following the 2022 legislative elections.
- The Social Liberal Party (PLS) is a liberal party founded by former Liberal Initiative member and 2023 failed leadership candidate, José Cardoso.
- The People's Monarchist Party (PPM) is a small monarchist party with little political expression. It is known that the pretender heir to the Portuguese throne, Duarte Pio, Duke of Braganza, does not support this party, since the question of monarchical regime is considered to be above partisanship. PPM itself doesn't support Duarte Pio's claim, supporting the claim of the former Duque of Loulé's line instead.
- We, the Citizens! (NC) is a minor centre-right party founded as a result of the anti-austerity movement.
- The Earth Party (MPT) is a centre-right green conservative party, founded in 1993 by a faction of the People's Monarchist Party.
- The Portuguese Labour Party (PTP) is a minor party of the centre-left.
- The Socialist Alternative Movement (MAS) was formed in 2000 as a Portuguese Trotskyist political organization and it is the result of a merger between the Left Revolutionary Front (FER - Frente da Esquerda Revolucionária), and the young activists of the student movement Ruptura. The Ruptura/FER activists integrated the Left Bloc since its formation. In 2011, the movement split from the Left Bloc and formed a new party called Socialist Alternative Movement that was approved by the Constitutional Court in July 2013.
- The (A)TUA A)T is a small party with the goal to defend the rights of retirees and pensioners, aiming to position itself as the political voice of the members of this age group. Originally called United Party of Retirees and Pensioners (PURP), the current name, (A)TUA, was approved in 2024, it was founded as a result of the anti-austerity movement.
- The Workers United (TU) is a far-left party founded in 2024 and legalized in 2026, led by Renata Cambra, a former member of the Socialist Alternative Movement. The party identifies itself as revolutionary socialist.

== Extinct parties since 1974 ==
This list presents the parties and coalitions of the current Third Republic that were once recognized by the Portuguese Constitutional Court but ceased to exist. It is organized by political spectrum and alphabetical order (in Portuguese).

=== Far-left ===
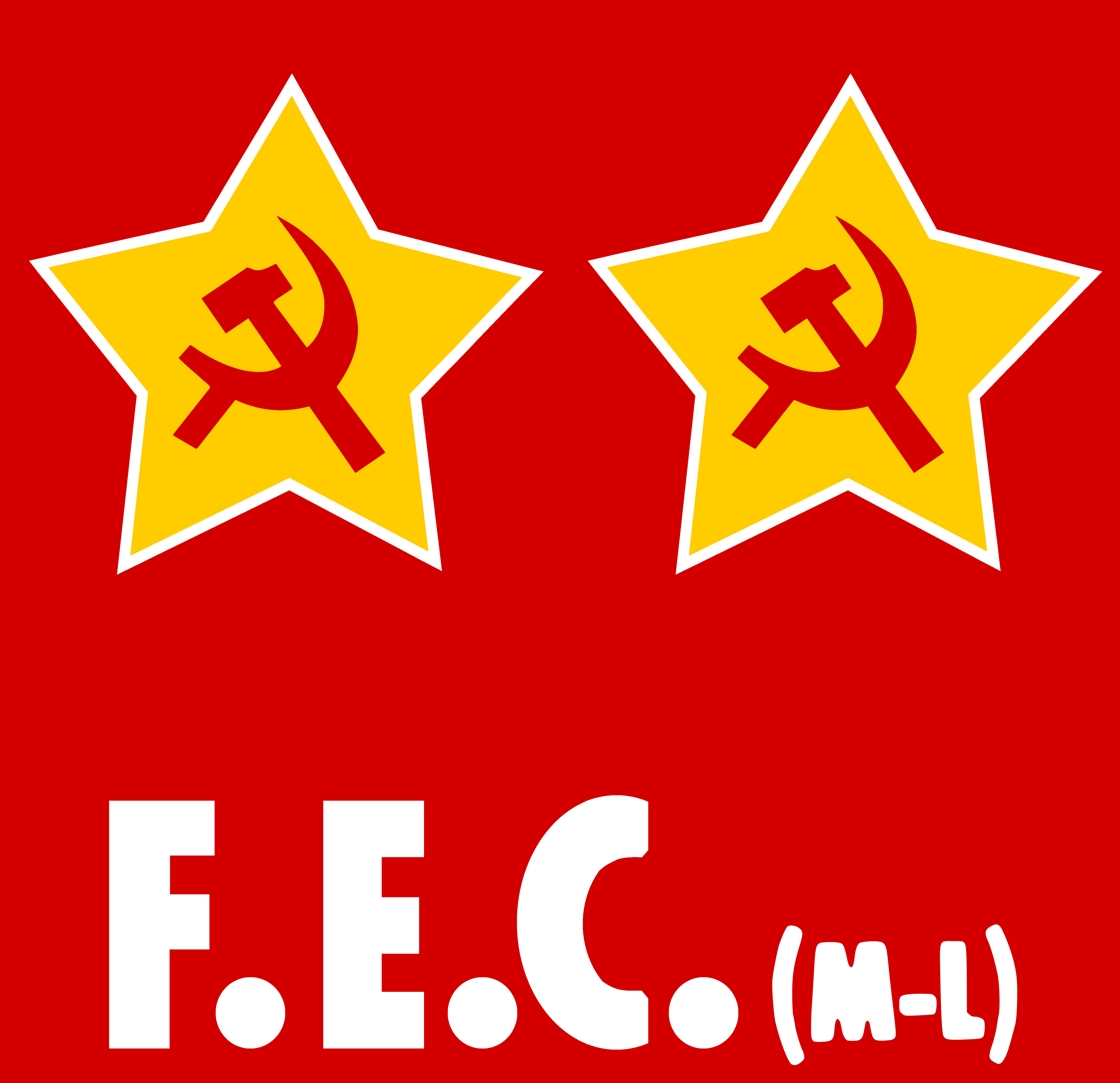
Logo of Communist Electoral Front (Marxist-Leninist), FEC(ML).

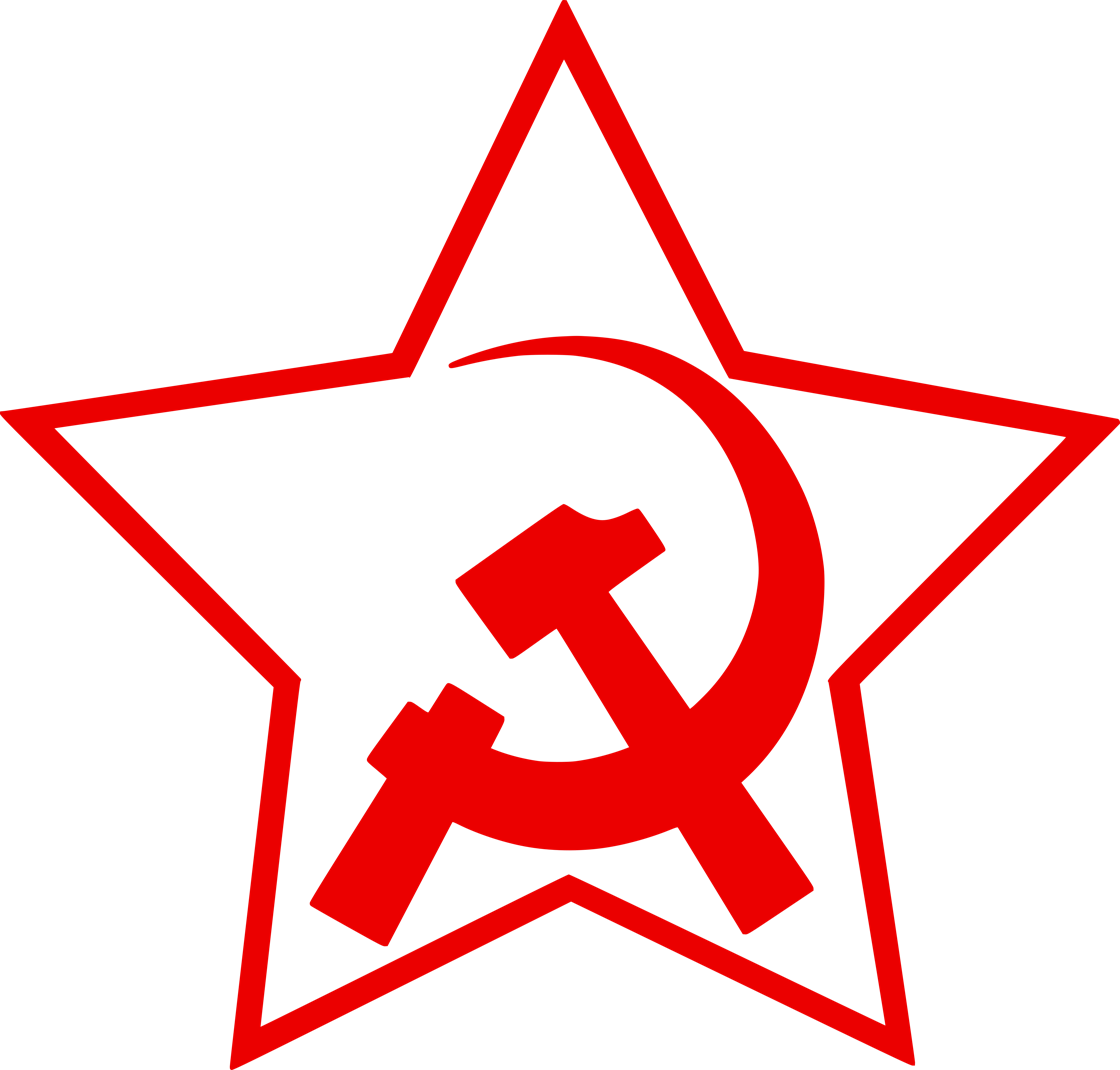
Logo of Portuguese Marxist-Leninist Communist Organization, OCMLP.

- Worker-Peasant Alliance - AOC (Aliança Operário-Camponesa)
- Portuguese Marxist–Leninist Committee - CM-LP (Comité Marxista-Leninista Português)
- Marxist–Leninist Committee of Portugal - CMLP (Comité Marxista-Leninista de Portugal)
- Communist Electoral Front (Marxist-Leninist) - FEC(ML) (Frente Eleitoral Comunista (Marxista–Leninista))
- Left Revolutionary Front - FER (Frente de Esquerda Revolucionária)
- Popular Unity Force - FUP (Força de Unidade Popular)
- Internationalist Communist League - LCI (Liga Comunista Internacionalista)
- Portuguese Marxist-Leninist Communist Organization - OCMLP (Organização Comunista Marxista Leninista Portuguesa)
- Workers Politics Communist Organisation - OCPO (Organização Comunista Política Operária)
- Organization for the Reconstruction of the Communist Party (Marxist–Leninist) - ORPC(ML) (Organização para a Reconstrução do Partido Comunista (Marxista-Leninista))
- Communist Party of Portugal (Marxist-Leninist) - PCP(ML) (Partido Comunista de Portugal (Marxista-Leninista))
- Communist Party (Reconstructed) - PC(R) (Partido Comunista (Reconstruído))
- Workers' Party of Socialist Unity - POUS (Partido Operário de Unidade Socialista)
- Revolutionary Party of the Proletariat – Revolutionary Brigades - PRP-BR (Partido Revolucionário do Proletariado - Brigadas Revolucionárias)
- Workers' Revolutionary Party - PRT (Partido Revolucionário dos Trabalhadores)
- Workers' Socialist Party - PST (Partido Socialista dos Trabalhadores)
- Labour Party - PT (Partido Trabalhista, not to be confused with the Portuguese Labour Party - PTP)
- Popular Unity Party - PUP (Partido de Unidade Popular)
- Communist Union for the Reconstruction of the Party (Marxist–Leninist) - UCRP(ML) (União Comunista para a Reconstituição do Partido (Marxista-Leninista))

=== Left-wing to far-left ===
- United People Alliance - APU (Aliança Povo Unido)
- Electoral Front United People - FEPU (Frente Eleitoral Povo Unido)

=== Left-wing ===
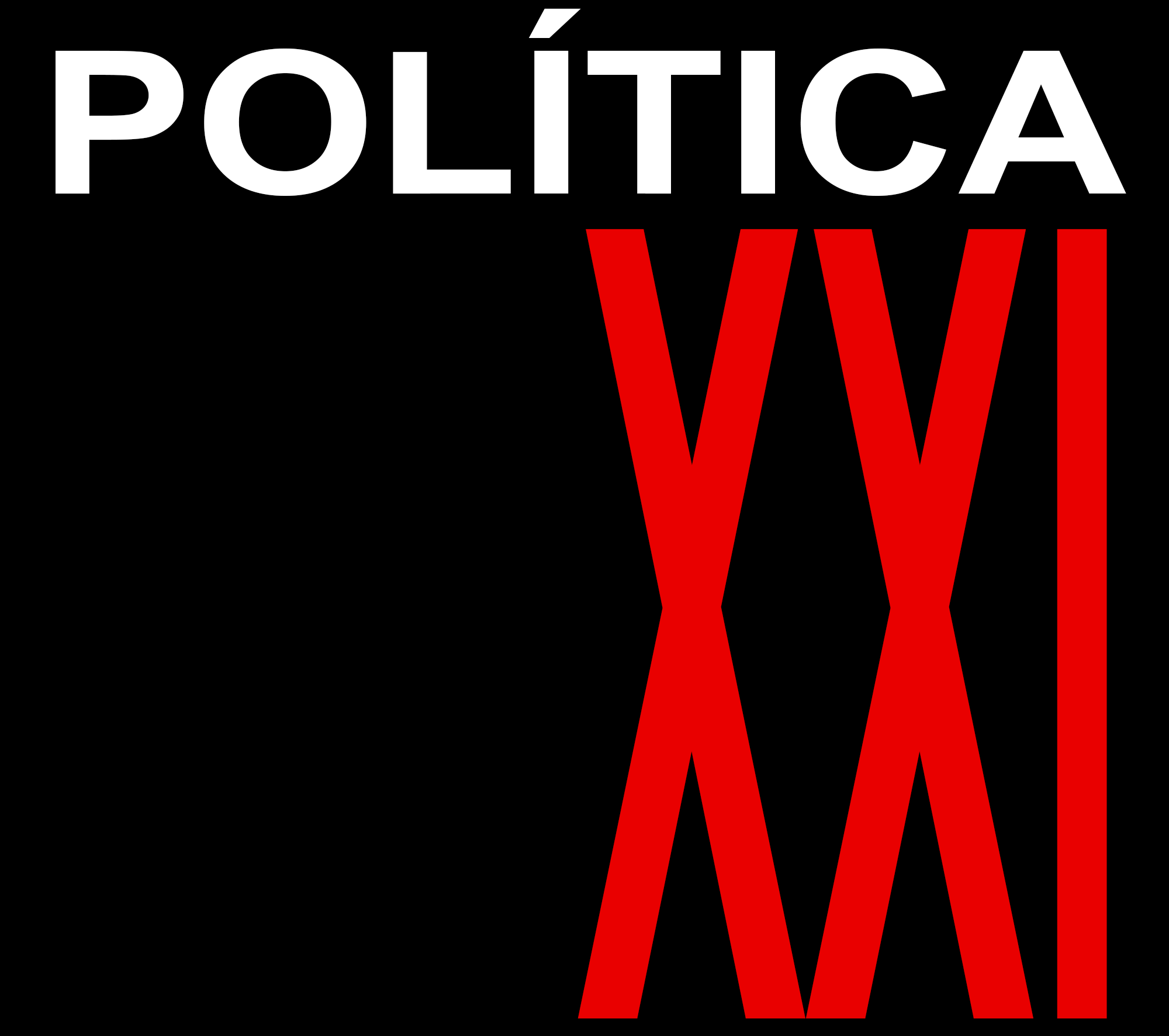
Logo of Politics XXI, PXXI.

- People's Socialist Front - FSP (Frente Socialista Popular)
- Popular Unity Dynamization Groups - GDUPs (Grupos Dinamizadores da Unidade Popular)
- Socialist League of the Workers - LST (Liga Socialista dos Trabalhadores)
- Portuguese Democratic Movement - MDP (Movimento Democrático Português)
- Movement of Socialist Left - MES (Movimento de Esquerda Socialista)
- Revolutionary Socialist Party - PSR (Partido Socialista Revolucionário)
- Popular Democratic Union - UDP (União Democrática Popular)
- Politics XXI - PXXI (Política XXI)
- Left-wing Union for the Socialist Democracy - UEDS (União da Esquerda para a Democracia Socialista)

=== Centre-left ===
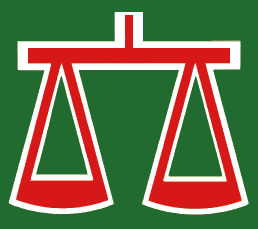
Logo of Democratic Renewal Party, PRD.

- Independent Social Democratic Action - ASDI (Acção Social Democrata Independente)
- Democratic Center of Macau - CDM (Centro Democrático de Macau)
- Republican and Socialist Front - FRS (Frente Republicana e Socialista)
- Party of the Folk - PG (Partido da Gente)
- Humanist Party - PH (Partido Humanista)
- Democratic Renewal Party - PRD (Partido Renovador Democrático)
- Portuguese Democratic Labour Party - PTDP (Partido Trabalhista Democrático Português)

=== Centre ===
- Movement for the Sick - MD (Movimento pelo Doente)
- Hope for Portugal Movement - MEP (Movimento Esperança Portugal)
- National Solidarity Party - PSN (Partido da Solidariedade Nacional)
- New Democracy Party - PND (Partido da Nova Democracia)
- Liberal Democratic Party - PLD (Partido Liberal Democrata)

=== Centre-right ===
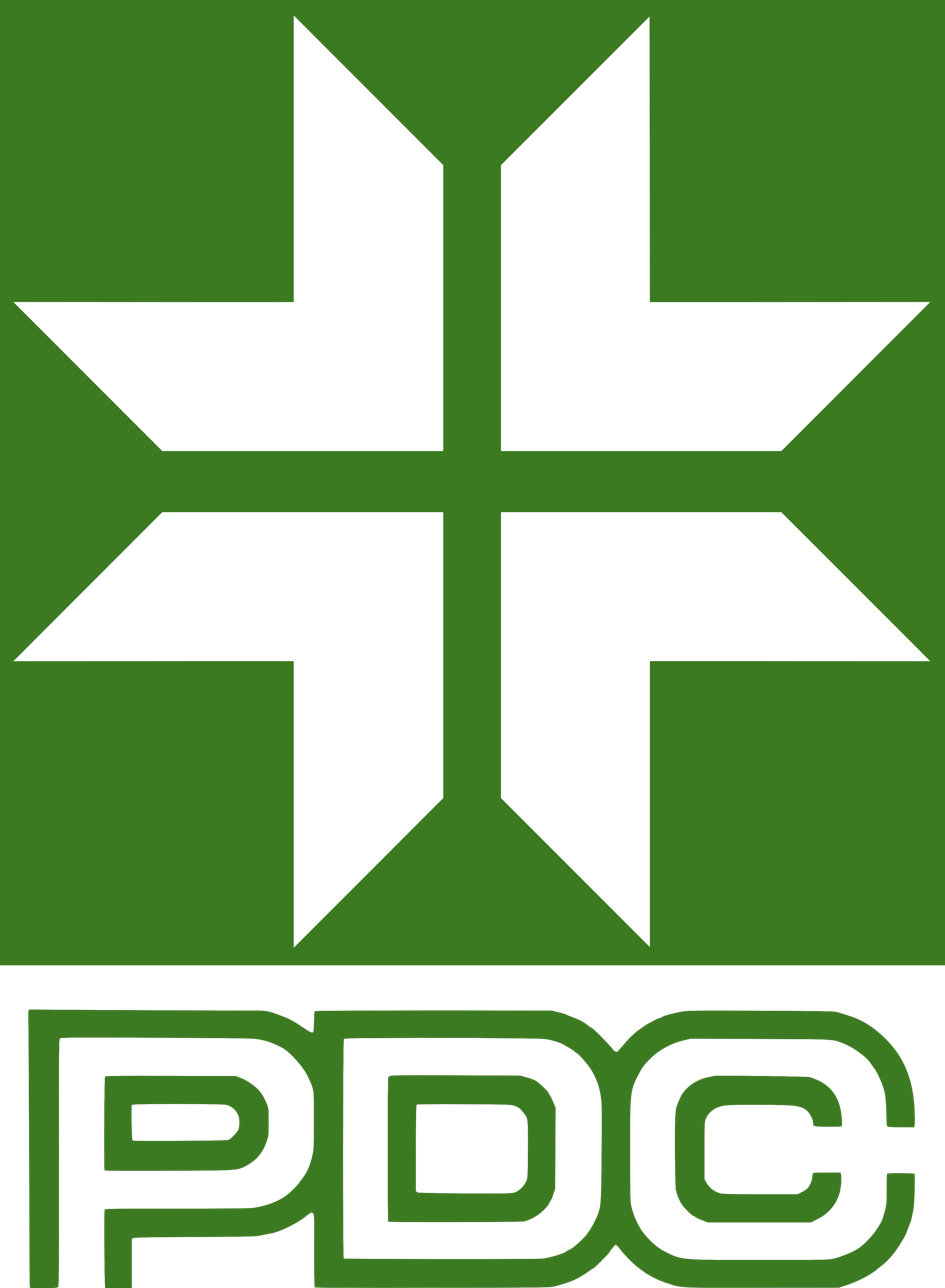
Logo of Party of the Christian Democracy, PDC.

- Democratic Alliance - AD (Aliança Democrática)
- Association for the Defense of the Interests of Macau - ADIM (Associação para a Defesa dos Interesses de Macau)
- Portuguese Party of the Regions - PPR (Partido Português das Regiões)
- Alliance - A (Aliança)

=== Right-wing ===
- Democratic Party of the Atlantic - PDA (Partido Democrático do Atlântico)
- Party of the Christian Democracy - PDC (Partido da Democracia Cristã)
- Citizenship and Christian Democracy - PPV/CDC (Cidadania e Democracia Cristã)

=== Far-right ===
- Democratic Movement of the Liberation of Portugal - MDLP (Movimento Democrático de Libertação de Portugal)
- Independent Movement for the National Reconstruction / Party of the Portuguese Right - MIRN/PDP (Movimento Independente para a Reconstrução Nacional / Partido da Direita Portuguesa)
- Rise up! - E (Ergue-te)

== Historical parties ==
This list includes the defunct political parties that never reached the Third Republic, in chronological order.

=== Constitutional Monarchy (1834–1910) ===
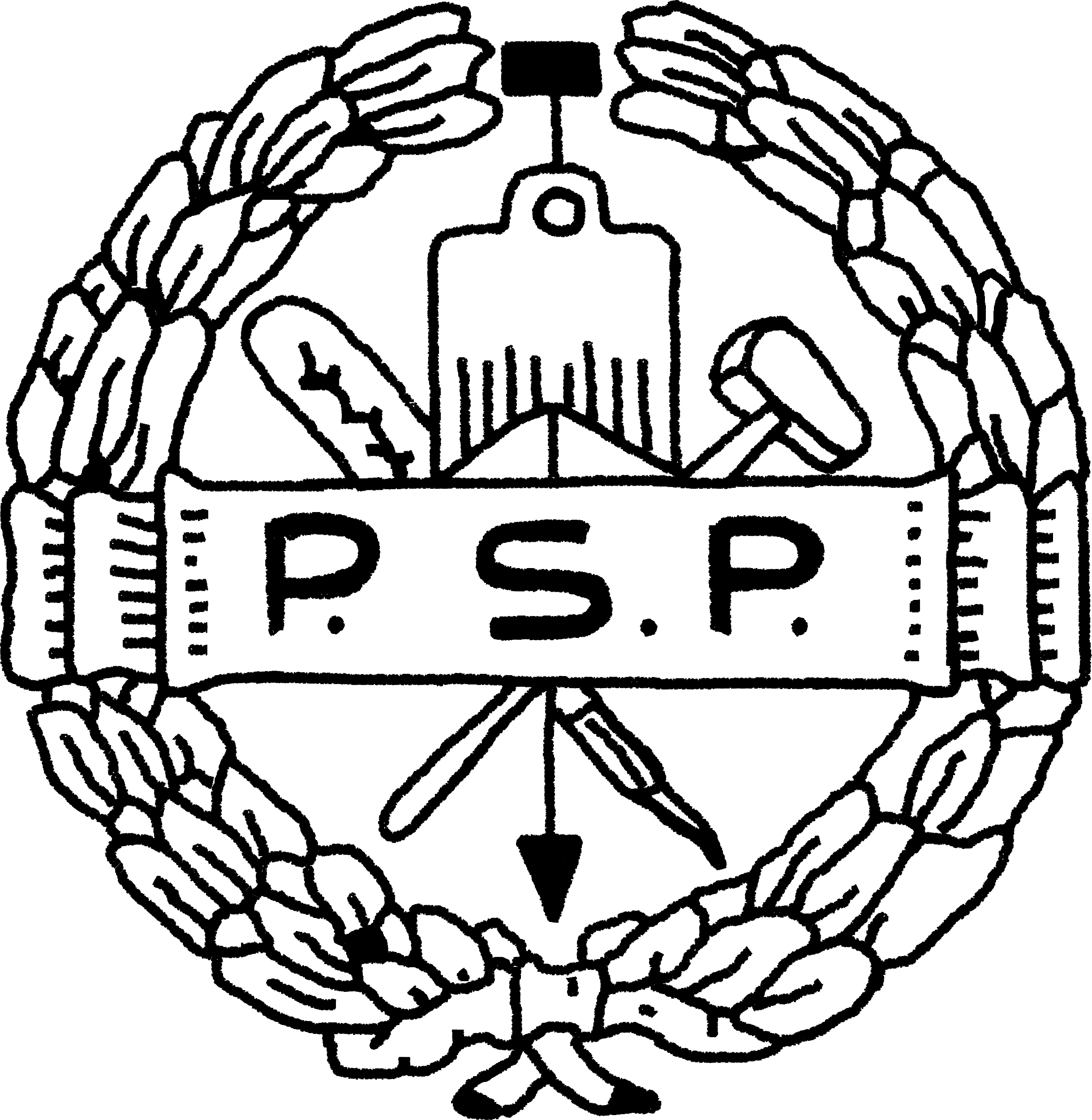
Logo of Portuguese Socialist Party, PSP.

- Chartism (Cartismo)
- Septemberism (Setembrismo)
- Regenerator Party - PR (Partido Regenerador)
- Historic Party - PH (Partido Histórico)
- Reformist Party - PR (Partido Reformista)
- Constituent Party - PC (Partido Constituinte)
- Progressive Party - PP (Partido Progressista)
- Portuguese Socialist Party - PSP (Partido Socialista Português)
- Portuguese Republican Party - PRP (Partido Republicano Português)
- Liberal Regenerator Party - PRL (Partido Regenerador Liberal)
- Progressive Dissidence - DP (Dissidência Progressista)

=== First Republic (1910–1926) ===
Logo of Monarchist Cause, CM.

- Democratic Party (Partido Democrático) – officially the Portuguese Republican Party
- Evolutionist Party - PRE (Partido Republicano Evolucionista)
- Republican Union - PUR (Partido da União Republicana)
- Lusitanian Integralism - IL (Integralismo Lusitano)
- Monarchist Cause - CM (Causa Monárquica)
- Catholic Centre Party - PCC (Partido do Centro Católico)
- National Republican Party - PNR (Partido Nacional Republicano)
- Republican Liberal Party - PLR (Partido Liberal Republicano)
- Reconstitution Party - PRRN (Partido Republicano da Reconstituição Nacional)
- Regionalist Party - PR (Partido Regionalista)
- Nationalist Republican Party - PRN (Partido Republicano Nacionalista)
- Democratic Leftwing Republican Party - PRED (Partido Republicano Esquerdista Democrático)
- Union of Economic Interests - UIE (União dos Interesses Económicos)

=== Ditadura Nacional (1926–1933) ===
- National Syndicalists - MNS (Movimento Nacional-Sindicalista)

=== Estado Novo (1933–1974) ===
Logo of National Union, UN.

Although the Estado Novo was a dictatorship, with the National Union being legally the only party, the opposition was sometimes allowed to compete in (sham) elections; other parties were constituted underground or in exile.

- National Union - UN (União Nacional)
- Movement of National Antifascist Unity - MUNAF (Movimento de Unidade Nacional Antifascista)
- Movement of Democratic Unity - MUD (Movimento de Unidade Democrática)
- Portuguese National Liberation Front - FPLP (Frente Portuguesa de Libertação Nacional)
- Portuguese Socialist Action - ASP (Acção Socialista Portuguesa)

== See also ==
- Politics of Portugal
- List of political parties by country
