= Coimbra (Assembly of the Republic constituency) =

Constituency of the Assembly of the Republic, the national legislature of Portugal

- Constituency for the Assembly of the Republic
- Location of Coimbra within Portugal
- District: Coimbra
- Population: 423,432 (2024)
- Electorate: 370,773 (2025)
- Area: 3,974 km^{2} (2024)

Current Constituency
- Created: 1976
- Seats: List: 9 (2011–present); 10 (1991–2011); 11 (1983–1991); 12 (1976–1983)
- Deputies: List: Pedro Delgado Alves (PS); Pedro Coimbra (PS); Rosa Isabel Cruz (PS); Maurício Marques (PSD); Eliseu Neves (CH); Ana Oliveira (PSD); Joana Seabra (PSD); Paulo Seco (CH); Martim Syder (PSD)

Coimbra is one of the 22 multi-member constituencies of the Assembly of the Republic, the national legislature of Portugal. The constituency was established in 1976 when the Assembly of the Republic was established by the constitution following the restoration of democracy. It is conterminous with the district of Coimbra. The constituency currently elects nine of the 230 members of the Assembly of the Republic using the closed party-list proportional representation electoral system. At the 2025 legislative election it had 370,773 registered electors.

== Electoral system ==
Coimbra currently elects nine of the 230 members of the Assembly of the Republic using the closed party-list proportional representation electoral system. Seats are allocated using the D'Hondt method.

== Election results ==
=== Summary ===
Election	Unitary Democrats CDU / APU / PCP			Left Bloc BE / UDP			LIVRE L			Socialists PS / FRS			People Animals Nature PAN			Democratic Renewal PRD			Social Democrats PSD / PàF / AD / PPD			Liberals IL			CDS – People's CDS–PP / CDS			Chega CH / PPV/CDC / PPV		
Election	Votes	%	Seats	Votes	%	Seats	Votes	%	Seats	Votes	%	Seats	Votes	%	Seats	Votes	%	Seats	Votes	%	Seats	Votes	%	Seats	Votes	%	Seats	Votes	%	Seats
2025	5,807	2.59%	0	5,028	2.24%	0	9,386	4.18%	0	63,405	28.25%	3	2,829	1.26%	0				79,549	35.44%	4	10,275	4.58%	0				42,547	18.96%	2
2024	6,819	2.90%	0	12,371	5.27%	0	6,890	2.93%	0	79,120	33.70%	4	3,839	1.64%	0				74,040	31.54%	3	9,592	4.09%	0				37,428	15.94%	2
2022	7,281	3.47%	0	10,888	5.19%	0	2,197	1.05%	0	97,324	46.42%	6	2,569	1.23%	0				62,804	29.96%	3	7,791	3.72%	0	3,244	1.55%	0	13,182	6.29%	0
2019	11,402	5.90%	0	22,805	11.80%	1	1,920	0.99%	0	79,596	41.18%	5	5,356	2.77%	0				54,286	28.09%	3	1,682	0.87%	0	7,103	3.68%	0	1,844	0.95%	0
2015	15,476	7.34%	0	21,773	10.33%	1	1,292	0.61%	0	77,688	36.86%	4	2,165	1.03%	0				81,880	38.85%	4									
2011	14,138	6.56%	0	13,034	6.05%	0				66,199	30.72%	3	2,535	1.18%	0				91,028	42.24%	5				22,391	10.39%	1	336	0.16%	0
2009	13,538	5.93%	0	25,514	11.17%	1				89,855	39.33%	4							72,461	31.71%	4				20,706	9.06%	1			
2005	13,463	5.71%	0	15,444	6.56%	0				111,042	47.14%	6							78,062	33.14%	4				13,365	5.67%	0			
2002	11,840	5.16%	0	5,664	2.47%	0				96,806	42.21%	5							95,944	41.83%	5				15,629	6.81%	0			
1999	14,200	6.24%	0	4,536	1.99%	0				109,536	48.16%	6							81,760	35.95%	4				13,875	6.10%	0			
1995	12,947	5.20%	0	1,249	0.50%	0				125,166	50.30%	6							87,817	35.29%	4				17,976	7.22%	0			
1991	12,419	5.15%	0							84,879	35.21%	4				1,325	0.55%	0	123,176	51.09%	6				8,715	3.61%	0			
1987	17,394	7.35%	1	1,045	0.44%	0				69,745	29.46%	4				8,395	3.55%	0	121,641	51.39%	6				11,025	4.66%	0			
1985	24,989	10.45%	1	1,967	0.82%	0				70,257	29.38%	3				41,648	17.41%	2	72,725	30.41%	4				21,208	8.87%	1			
1983	26,471	11.00%	1							112,518	46.78%	6							68,935	28.66%	3				25,375	10.55%	1			
1980	26,231	10.15%	1	2,124	0.82%	0				95,350	36.89%	5							122,488	47.39%	6									
1979	29,944	11.65%	1	3,529	1.37%	0				94,256	36.68%	5							120,298	46.82%	6									
1976	17,405	7.77%	1	2,771	1.24%	0				98,162	43.81%	6							64,162	28.64%	4				29,967	13.38%	1			

(Figures in italics represent alliances.)

=== Detailed ===
==== 2020s ====
===== 2025 =====
Results of the 2025 legislative election held on 18 May 2025:

Party		Votes	%	Seats
Democratic Alliance	AD	79,549	35.44%	4
Socialist Party	PS	63,405	28.25%	3
Chega	CH	42,547	18.96%	2
Liberal Initiative	IL	10,275	4.58%	0
LIVRE	L	9,386	4.18%	0
Unitary Democratic Coalition	CDU	5,807	2.59%	0
Left Bloc	BE	5,028	2.24%	0
National Democratic Alternative	ADN	3,753	1.67%	0
People Animals Nature	PAN	2,829	1.26%	0
React, Include, Recycle	RIR	475	0.21%	0
Volt Portugal	Volt	400	0.18%	0
Ergue-te	E	341	0.15%	0
New Right	ND	245	0.11%	0
People's Monarchist Party	PPM	237	0.11%	0
Together for the People	JPP	154	0.07%	0
Earth Party	PT	0	0.00%	0
Liberal Social Party	PLS	0	0.00%	0
Portuguese Labour Party	PTP	0	0.00%	0
Portuguese Workers' Communist Party	PCTP	0	0.00%	0
We, the Citizens!	NC	0	0.00%	0
Valid votes		224,431	100.00%	9
Blank votes		4,581	1.98%	
Rejected votes – other		2,311	1.00%	
Total polled		231,323	62.39%	
Registered electors		370,773		

The following candidates were elected:: Pedro Delgado Alves (PS); Pedro Coimbra (PS); Rosa Isabel Cruz (PS); Rita Júdice (AD); Pedro Machado (AD); Maurício Marques (AD); Eliseu Neves (CH); Ana Oliveira (AD); and Paulo Seco (CH).

===== 2024 =====
Results of the 2024 legislative election held on 10 March 2024:

Party		Votes	%	Seats
Socialist Party	PS	79,120	33.70%	4
Democratic Alliance	AD	74,040	31.54%	3
Chega	CH	37,428	15.94%	2
Left Bloc	BE	12,371	5.27%	0
Liberal Initiative	IL	9,592	4.09%	0
LIVRE	L	6,890	2.93%	0
Unitary Democratic Coalition	CDU	6,819	2.90%	0
People Animals Nature	PAN	3,839	1.64%	0
National Democratic Alternative	ADN	2,426	1.03%	0
React, Include, Recycle	RIR	731	0.31%	0
New Right	ND	578	0.25%	0
Volt Portugal	Volt	427	0.18%	0
Together for the People	JPP	185	0.08%	0
Ergue-te	E	177	0.08%	0
Alternative 21 (Earth Party and Alliance)	PT-A	162	0.07%	0
Valid votes		234,785	100.00%	9
Blank votes		4,797	1.98%	
Rejected votes – other		2,558	1.06%	
Total polled		242,140	65.13%	
Registered electors		371,769		

The following candidates were elected: Ana Abrunhosa (PS); Pedro Coimbra (PS); Raquel Ferreira (PS); Rita Júdice (AD); Ricardo Lino (PS); Maurício Marques (AD); Eliseu Neves (CH); António Pinto Pereira (CH); and Martim Syder (AD).

===== 2022 =====
Results of the 2022 legislative election held on 30 January 2022:

Party		Votes	%	Seats
Socialist Party	PS	97,324	46.42%	6
Social Democratic Party	PSD	62,804	29.96%	3
Chega	CH	13,182	6.29%	0
Left Bloc	BE	10,888	5.19%	0
Liberal Initiative	IL	7,791	3.72%	0
Unitary Democratic Coalition	CDU	7,281	3.47%	0
CDS – People's Party	CDS–PP	3,244	1.55%	0
People Animals Nature	PAN	2,569	1.23%	0
LIVRE	L	2,197	1.05%	0
React, Include, Recycle	RIR	706	0.34%	0
Portuguese Workers' Communist Party	PCTP	526	0.25%	0
Alliance	A	320	0.15%	0
Volt Portugal	Volt	257	0.12%	0
Socialist Alternative Movement	MAS	242	0.12%	0
Earth Party	PT	203	0.10%	0
Ergue-te	E	120	0.06%	0
Valid votes		209,654	100.00%	9
Blank votes		3,120	1.45%	
Rejected votes – other		2,329	1.08%	
Total polled		215,103	57.37%	
Registered electors		374,935		

The following candidates were elected: José Carlos Alexandrino (PS); Pedro Coimbra (PS); Raquel Ferreira (PS); Ricardo Lino (PS); Tiago Estevão Martins (PS); João Barbosa de Melo (PSD); Mónica Quintela (PSD); Fátima Ramos (PSD); and Marta Temido (PS).

==== 2010s ====
===== 2019 =====
Results of the 2019 legislative election held on 6 October 2019:

Party		Votes	%	Seats
Socialist Party	PS	79,596	41.18%	5
Social Democratic Party	PSD	54,286	28.09%	3
Left Bloc	BE	22,805	11.80%	1
Unitary Democratic Coalition	CDU	11,402	5.90%	0
CDS – People's Party	CDS–PP	7,103	3.68%	0
People Animals Nature	PAN	5,356	2.77%	0
Alliance	A	2,106	1.09%	0
LIVRE	L	1,920	0.99%	0
Chega	CH	1,844	0.95%	0
Liberal Initiative	IL	1,682	0.87%	0
React, Include, Recycle	RIR	1,152	0.60%	0
Portuguese Workers' Communist Party	PCTP	1,032	0.53%	0
National Renewal Party	PNR	624	0.32%	0
Democratic Republican Party	PDR	449	0.23%	0
We, the Citizens!	NC	441	0.23%	0
Earth Party	PT	414	0.21%	0
United Party of Retirees and Pensioners	PURP	410	0.21%	0
Socialist Alternative Movement	MAS	251	0.13%	0
People's Monarchist Party	PPM	244	0.13%	0
Together for the People	JPP	149	0.08%	0
Valid votes		193,266	100.00%	9
Blank votes		6,910	3.39%	
Rejected votes – other		3,755	1.84%	
Total polled		203,931	53.67%	
Registered electors		380,004		

The following candidates were elected: António Maló de Abreu (PSD); João Ataíde (PS); Pedro Coimbra (PS); Cristina Jesus (PS); Paulo Leitão (PSD); Tiago Estevão Martins (PS); José Manuel Pureza (BE); Mónica Quintela (PSD); and Marta Temido (PS).

===== 2015 =====
Results of the 2015 legislative election held on 4 October 2015:

Party		Votes	%	Seats
Portugal Ahead	PàF	81,880	38.85%	4
Socialist Party	PS	77,688	36.86%	4
Left Bloc	BE	21,773	10.33%	1
Unitary Democratic Coalition	CDU	15,476	7.34%	0
Democratic Republican Party	PDR	3,626	1.72%	0
People Animals Nature	PAN	2,165	1.03%	0
Portuguese Workers' Communist Party	PCTP	1,889	0.90%	0
LIVRE	L	1,292	0.61%	0
National Renewal Party	PNR	1,099	0.52%	0
ACT! (Portuguese Labour Party and Socialist Alternative Movement)	AGIR	1,081	0.51%	0
The Earth Party Movement	MPT	851	0.40%	0
We, the Citizens!	NC	683	0.32%	0
People's Monarchist Party	PPM	526	0.25%	0
United Party of Retirees and Pensioners	PURP	451	0.21%	0
Together for the People	JPP	272	0.13%	0
Valid votes		210,752	100.00%	9
Blank votes		5,946	2.70%	
Rejected votes – other		3,500	1.59%	
Total polled		220,198	56.32%	
Registered electors		390,950		

The following candidates were elected: Pedro Coimbra (PS); Helena Freitas (PS); João Galamba (PS); Margarida Mano (PàF); Maurício Marques (PàF); Elza Pais (PS); José Manuel Pureza (BE); Fátima Ramos (PàF); and Manuel Rodrigues (PàF).

===== 2011 =====
Results of the 2011 legislative election held on 5 June 2011:

Party		Votes	%	Seats
Social Democratic Party	PSD	91,028	42.24%	5
Socialist Party	PS	66,199	30.72%	3
CDS – People's Party	CDS–PP	22,391	10.39%	1
Unitary Democratic Coalition	CDU	14,138	6.56%	0
Left Bloc	BE	13,034	6.05%	0
Party for Animals and Nature	PAN	2,535	1.18%	0
Portuguese Workers' Communist Party	PCTP	2,014	0.93%	0
Hope for Portugal Movement	MEP	900	0.42%	0
The Earth Party Movement	MPT	662	0.31%	0
Portuguese Labour Party	PTP	600	0.28%	0
National Renewal Party	PNR	591	0.27%	0
People's Monarchist Party	PPM	557	0.26%	0
New Democracy Party	ND	526	0.24%	0
Pro-Life Party	PPV	336	0.16%	0
Valid votes		215,511	100.00%	9
Blank votes		8,155	3.60%	
Rejected votes – other		3,093	1.36%	
Total polled		226,759	57.34%	
Registered electors		395,464		

The following candidates were elected: José Manuel Canavarro (PSD); Nuno Encarnação (PSD); Ana Jorge (PS); Maurício Marques (PSD); João Serpa Oliva (CDS-PP); João Portugal (PS); Mário Ruivo (PS); Pedro Saraiva (PSD); and Nilza de Sena (PSD).

==== 2000s ====
===== 2009 =====
Results of the 2009 legislative election held on 27 September 2009:

Party		Votes	%	Seats
Socialist Party	PS	89,855	39.33%	4
Social Democratic Party	PSD	72,461	31.71%	4
Left Bloc	BE	25,514	11.17%	1
CDS – People's Party	CDS–PP	20,706	9.06%	1
Unitary Democratic Coalition	CDU	13,538	5.93%	0
Portuguese Workers' Communist Party	PCTP	2,504	1.10%	0
Hope for Portugal Movement	MEP	1,077	0.47%	0
People's Monarchist Party	PPM	691	0.30%	0
Portuguese Labour Party	PTP	542	0.24%	0
Merit and Society Movement	MMS	463	0.20%	0
The Earth Party Movement and Humanist Party	MPT-PH	450	0.20%	0
National Renewal Party	PNR	446	0.20%	0
Workers' Party of Socialist Unity	POUS	241	0.11%	0
Valid votes		228,488	100.00%	10
Blank votes		5,248	2.22%	
Rejected votes – other		2,815	1.19%	
Total polled		236,551	60.04%	
Registered electors		394,004		

The following candidates were elected: Rosário Águas (PSD); Horácio Antunes (PS); Vítor Baptista (PS); Nuno Encarnação (PSD); Ana Jorge (PS); João Serpa Oliva (CDS-PP); Paulo Mota Pinto (PSD); José Manuel Pureza (BE); Maria Antónia Almeida Santos (PS); and Pedro Saraiva (PSD).

===== 2005 =====
Results of the 2005 legislative election held on 20 February 2005:

Party		Votes	%	Seats
Socialist Party	PS	111,042	47.14%	6
Social Democratic Party	PSD	78,062	33.14%	4
Left Bloc	BE	15,444	6.56%	0
Unitary Democratic Coalition	CDU	13,463	5.71%	0
CDS – People's Party	CDS–PP	13,365	5.67%	0
Portuguese Workers' Communist Party	PCTP	1,551	0.66%	0
New Democracy Party	ND	1,285	0.55%	0
Humanist Party	PH	664	0.28%	0
Workers' Party of Socialist Unity	POUS	360	0.15%	0
National Renewal Party	PNR	341	0.14%	0
Valid votes		235,577	100.00%	10
Blank votes		5,841	2.39%	
Rejected votes – other		2,761	1.13%	
Total polled		244,179	64.41%	
Registered electors		379,094		

The following candidates were elected: Fernando Antunes (PSD); Horácio Antunes (PS); Vítor Baptista (PS); Paulo Pereira Coelho (PSD); Matilde Sousa Franco (PS); João Portugal (PS); Teresa Portugal (PS); Maria Antónia Almeida Santos (PS); Zita Seabra (PSD); and Jaime Soares (PSD).

===== 2002 =====
Results of the 2002 legislative election held on 17 March 2002:

Party		Votes	%	Seats
Socialist Party	PS	96,806	42.21%	5
Social Democratic Party	PSD	95,944	41.83%	5
CDS – People's Party	CDS–PP	15,629	6.81%	0
Unitary Democratic Coalition	CDU	11,840	5.16%	0
Left Bloc	BE	5,664	2.47%	0
Portuguese Workers' Communist Party	PCTP	1,048	0.46%	0
People's Monarchist Party	PPM	809	0.35%	0
The Earth Party Movement	MPT	650	0.28%	0
Humanist Party	PH	532	0.23%	0
Workers' Party of Socialist Unity	POUS	222	0.10%	0
National Renewal Party	PNR	212	0.09%	0
Valid votes		229,356	100.00%	10
Blank votes		2,776	1.18%	
Rejected votes – other		2,176	0.93%	
Total polled		234,308	61.75%	
Registered electors		379,453		

The following candidates were elected: João Rui de Almeida (PS); Vítor Baptista (PS); Massano Cardoso (PSD); Paulo Pereira Coelho (PSD); Miguel Coleta (PSD); Fausto Correia (PS); Manuel Dias Loureiro (PSD); Teresa Morais (PSD); Helena Roseta (PS); and Maria Antónia Almeida Santos (PS).

==== 1990s ====
===== 1999 =====
Results of the 1999 legislative election held on 10 October 1999:

Party		Votes	%	Seats
Socialist Party	PS	109,536	48.16%	6
Social Democratic Party	PSD	81,760	35.95%	4
Unitary Democratic Coalition	CDU	14,200	6.24%	0
CDS – People's Party	CDS–PP	13,875	6.10%	0
Left Bloc	BE	4,536	1.99%	0
Portuguese Workers' Communist Party	PCTP	1,251	0.55%	0
People's Monarchist Party	PPM	948	0.42%	0
The Earth Party Movement	MPT	640	0.28%	0
Humanist Party	PH	430	0.19%	0
Workers' Party of Socialist Unity	POUS	243	0.11%	0
Valid votes		227,419	100.00%	10
Blank votes		2,564	1.10%	
Rejected votes – other		2,280	0.98%	
Total polled		232,263	61.38%	
Registered electors		378,410		

The following candidates were elected: Manuel Alegre (PS); João Rui de Almeida (PS); Paulo Pereira Coelho (PSD); Maria Teresa Coimbra (PS); Fausto Correia (PS); Carlos Encarnação (PSD); Nuno Freitas (PSD); Pedro Santana Lopes (PSD); Luís Parreirão (PS); and José Penedos (PS).

===== 1995 =====
Results of the 1995 legislative election held on 1 October 1995:

Party		Votes	%	Seats
Socialist Party	PS	125,166	50.30%	6
Social Democratic Party	PSD	87,817	35.29%	4
CDS – People's Party	CDS–PP	17,976	7.22%	0
Unitary Democratic Coalition	CDU	12,947	5.20%	0
Portuguese Workers' Communist Party	PCTP	1,575	0.63%	0
Revolutionary Socialist Party	PSR	1,490	0.60%	0
Popular Democratic Union	UDP	1,249	0.50%	0
National Solidarity Party	PSN	615	0.25%	0
Valid votes		248,835	100.00%	10
Blank votes		2,414	0.95%	
Rejected votes – other		3,551	1.39%	
Total polled		254,800	67.01%	
Registered electors		380,227		

The following candidates were elected: Manuel Alegre (PS); João Rui de Almeida (PS); Carlos Beja (PS); Fausto Correia (PS); Carlos Encarnação (PSD); Osório Gomes (PS); Barbosa de Melo (PSD); Fernanda Mota Pinto (PSD); Maria João Rodrigues (PS); and Calvão da Silva (PSD).

===== 1991 =====
Results of the 1991 legislative election held on 6 October 1991:

Party		Votes	%	Seats
Social Democratic Party	PSD	123,176	51.09%	6
Socialist Party	PS	84,879	35.21%	4
Unitary Democratic Coalition	CDU	12,419	5.15%	0
Social Democratic Centre Party	CDS	8,715	3.61%	0
National Solidarity Party	PSN	4,113	1.71%	0
Revolutionary Socialist Party	PSR	2,315	0.96%	0
Portuguese Workers' Communist Party	PCTP	1,553	0.64%	0
Democratic Renewal Party	PRD	1,325	0.55%	0
People's Monarchist Party	PPM	1,104	0.46%	0
Left Revolutionary Front	FER	1,041	0.43%	0
Democratic Party of the Atlantic	PDA	457	0.19%	0
Valid votes		241,097	100.00%	10
Blank votes		2,548	1.03%	
Rejected votes – other		3,054	1.24%	
Total polled		246,699	66.26%	
Registered electors		372,347		

The following candidates were elected: Manuel Alegre (PS); João Rui de Almeida (PS); Álvaro Amaro (PSD); Costa Andrade (PSD); António Campos (PS); Carlos Encarnação (PSD); Barbosa de Melo (PSD); José Penedos (PS); Fernanda Mota Pinto (PSD); and Luís Pais de Sousa (PSD).

==== 1980s ====
===== 1987 =====
Results of the 1987 legislative election held on 19 July 1987:

Party		Votes	%	Seats
Social Democratic Party	PSD	121,641	51.39%	6
Socialist Party	PS	69,745	29.46%	4
Unitary Democratic Coalition	CDU	17,394	7.35%	1
Social Democratic Centre Party	CDS	11,025	4.66%	0
Democratic Renewal Party	PRD	8,395	3.55%	0
People's Monarchist Party	PPM	1,712	0.72%	0
Communist Party (Reconstructed)	PC(R)	1,241	0.52%	0
Revolutionary Socialist Party	PSR	1,111	0.47%	0
Workers' Party of Socialist Unity	POUS	1,048	0.44%	0
Popular Democratic Union	UDP	1,045	0.44%	0
Portuguese Democratic Movement	MDP	1,026	0.43%	0
Christian Democratic Party	PDC	859	0.36%	0
Portuguese Workers' Communist Party	PCTP	472	0.20%	0
Valid votes		236,714	100.00%	11
Blank votes		2,784	1.14%	
Rejected votes – other		3,717	1.53%	
Total polled		243,215	69.07%	
Registered electors		352,105		

The following candidates were elected: Manuel Alegre (PS); João Rui de Almeida (PS); Costa Andrade (PSD); António Campos (PS); José de Castro (CDU); Paulo Pereira Coelho (PSD); Osório Gomes (PS); Fernando Nogueira (PSD); Manuel Pereira (PSD); Mário Raposo (PSD); and Luís Pais de Sousa (PSD).

===== 1985 =====
Results of the 1985 legislative election held on 6 October 1985:

Party		Votes	%	Seats
Social Democratic Party	PSD	72,725	30.41%	4
Socialist Party	PS	70,257	29.38%	3
Democratic Renewal Party	PRD	41,648	17.41%	2
United People Alliance	APU	24,989	10.45%	1
Social Democratic Centre Party	CDS	21,208	8.87%	1
Popular Democratic Union	UDP	1,967	0.82%	0
Christian Democratic Party	PDC	1,630	0.68%	0
Revolutionary Socialist Party	PSR	1,554	0.65%	0
Workers' Party of Socialist Unity	POUS	1,390	0.58%	0
Portuguese Workers' Communist Party	PCTP	1,123	0.47%	0
Communist Party (Reconstructed)	PC(R)	672	0.28%	0
Valid votes		239,163	100.00%	11
Blank votes		2,753	1.12%	
Rejected votes – other		4,767	1.93%	
Total polled		246,683	70.14%	
Registered electors		351,684		

The following candidates were elected: Manuel Alegre (PS); Costa Andrade (PSD); António Campos (PS); Arménio Carvalho (PRD); Carlos Sá Furtado (PRD); Manuel Dias Loureiro (PSD); Carlos Santana Maia (PS); Fernando Nogueira (PSD); Manuel Pereira (PSD); Manuel Queiró (CDS); and Jaime Serra (APU).

===== 1983 =====
Results of the 1983 legislative election held on 25 April 1983:

Party		Votes	%	Seats
Socialist Party	PS	112,518	46.78%	6
Social Democratic Party	PSD	68,935	28.66%	3
United People Alliance	APU	26,471	11.00%	1
Social Democratic Centre Party	CDS	25,375	10.55%	1
Popular Democratic Union and Revolutionary Socialist Party	UDP-PSR	1,808	0.75%	0
Christian Democratic Party	PDC	1,430	0.59%	0
Workers' Party of Socialist Unity	POUS	1,255	0.52%	0
People's Monarchist Party	PPM	1,011	0.42%	0
Portuguese Workers' Communist Party	PCTP	918	0.38%	0
Socialist Workers League	LST	592	0.25%	0
Portuguese Marxist–Leninist Communist Organization	OCMLP	230	0.10%	0
Valid votes		240,543	100.00%	11
Blank votes		2,038	0.82%	
Rejected votes – other		5,626	2.27%	
Total polled		248,207	74.90%	
Registered electors		331,399		

The following candidates were elected: Manuel Alegre (PS); Dinis Alves (PS); Costa Andrade (PSD); António Campos (PS); Henrique Vieira Gomes (PS); Carlos Santana Maia (PS); Manuel Pereira (PSD); Carlos Mota Pinto (PSD); José Cunha Sá (PS); Jaime Serra (APU); and Cruz Vilaça (CDS).

===== 1980 =====
Results of the 1980 legislative election held on 5 October 1980:

Party		Votes	%	Seats
Democratic Alliance	AD	122,488	47.39%	6
Republican and Socialist Front	FRS	95,350	36.89%	5
United People Alliance	APU	26,231	10.15%	1
Workers' Party of Socialist Unity	POUS	4,067	1.57%	0
Revolutionary Socialist Party	PSR	2,596	1.00%	0
Popular Democratic Union	UDP	2,124	0.82%	0
Labour Party	PT	2,064	0.80%	0
Christian Democratic Party, Independent Movement for the National Reconstruction / Party of the Portuguese Right and National Front	PDC- MIRN/ PDP- FN	1,762	0.68%	0
Portuguese Workers' Communist Party	PCTP	973	0.38%	0
Portuguese Marxist–Leninist Communist Organization	OCMLP	792	0.31%	0
Valid votes		258,447	100.00%	12
Blank votes		1,733	0.65%	
Rejected votes – other		5,431	2.04%	
Total polled		265,611	81.58%	
Registered electors		325,589		

The following candidates were elected: Manuel Alegre (FRS); Costa Andrade (AD); Duarte Arnaut (FRS); Vitor Brás (FRS); António Campos (FRS); Jorge Silva Leite (APU); Mário Maduro (AD); Fernando Marinho (FRS); Manuel Pereira (AD); Francisco Lucas Pires (AD); Jaime Ramos (AD); and Mário Raposo (AD).

==== 1970s ====
===== 1979 =====
Results of the 1979 legislative election held on 2 December 1979:

Party		Votes	%	Seats
Democratic Alliance	AD	120,298	46.82%	6
Socialist Party	PS	94,256	36.68%	5
United People Alliance	APU	29,944	11.65%	1
Popular Democratic Union	UDP	3,529	1.37%	0
Portuguese Workers' Communist Party	PCTP	2,653	1.03%	0
Left-wing Union for the Socialist Democracy	UEDS	2,599	1.01%	0
Workers' Party of Socialist Unity	POUS	1,878	0.73%	0
Revolutionary Socialist Party	PSR	1,396	0.54%	0
Portuguese Marxist–Leninist Communist Organization	OCMLP	395	0.15%	0
Valid votes		256,948	100.00%	12
Blank votes		2,290	0.85%	
Rejected votes – other		9,136	3.40%	
Total polled		268,374	84.14%	
Registered electors		318,971		

The following candidates were elected: Manuel Alegre (PS); Duarte Arnaut (PS); Henrique de Barros (PS); António Campos (PS); Jaime Adalberto Simões Fernandes (AD); Jorge Silva Leite (APU); Fernando Marinho (PS); Joaquim Marques Gaspar Mendes (AD); Manuel Pereira (AD); Francisco Lucas Pires (AD); Mário Raposo (AD); and Maria Simões Saraiva (AD).

===== 1976 =====
Results of the 1976 legislative election held on 25 April 1976:

Party		Votes	%	Seats
Socialist Party	PS	98,162	43.81%	6
Democratic People's Party	PPD	64,162	28.64%	4
Social Democratic Centre Party	CDS	29,967	13.38%	1
Portuguese Communist Party	PCP	17,405	7.77%	1
Popular Democratic Union	UDP	2,771	1.24%	0
People's Socialist Front	FSP	1,718	0.77%	0
Christian Democratic Party	PDC	1,671	0.75%	0
Workers' Revolutionary Party	PRT	1,584	0.71%	0
Re-Organized Movement of the Party of the Proletariat	MRPP	1,430	0.64%	0
People's Monarchist Party	PPM	1,356	0.61%	0
Internationalist Communist League	LCI	1,159	0.52%	0
Movement of Socialist Left	MES	1,090	0.49%	0
Worker–Peasant Alliance	AOC	1,066	0.48%	0
Communist Party of Portugal (Marxist–Leninist)	PCP(ML)	498	0.22%	0
Valid votes		224,039	100.00%	12
Rejected votes		16,046	6.68%	
Total polled		240,085	77.43%	
Registered electors		310,085		

The following candidates were elected: Manuel Alegre (PS); Duarte Arnaut (PS); António Campos (PS); Manuel da Costa (PS); Gabriel Frada (PPD); Dias Lourenço (PCP); Barbosa de Melo (PPD); João António Martelo de Oliveira (PPD); João Porto (CDS); António Jorge Portugal (PS); Victor Hugo Santos (PPD); and Joaquim Barros de Sousa (PS).
