= Organization for the Reconstruction of the Communist Party (Marxist–Leninist) =

Communist group in Portugal

ORPC(ML) poster. Text at bottom reads "For the construction of ORPC(ML). For the reconstruction of the Communist Party"

Organization for the Reconstruction of the Communist Party (Marxist–Leninist) (in Portuguese: Organização para a Reconstrução do Partido Comunista (Marxista-Leninista)) was a communist group in Portugal led by Francisco Martins Rodrigues. ORPC (M-L) was formed in April 1975.

ORPC(ML) published Causa Operária.

In 1976 ORPC(ML) merged with the Portuguese Marxist-Leninist Communist Organization (OCMLP) and the Portuguese Marxist-Leninist Committee (CMLP, former PUP) to form the Portuguese Communist Party (Reconstructed) (PCP(R)).
