= 1976 Portuguese local elections =

- 12 December 1976

All 304 Portuguese municipalities and 4,260 Portuguese Parishes All 1,906 local government councils
- Turnout: 64.6%
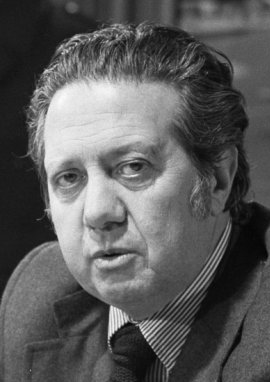

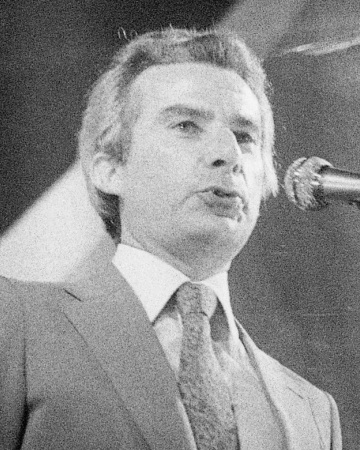

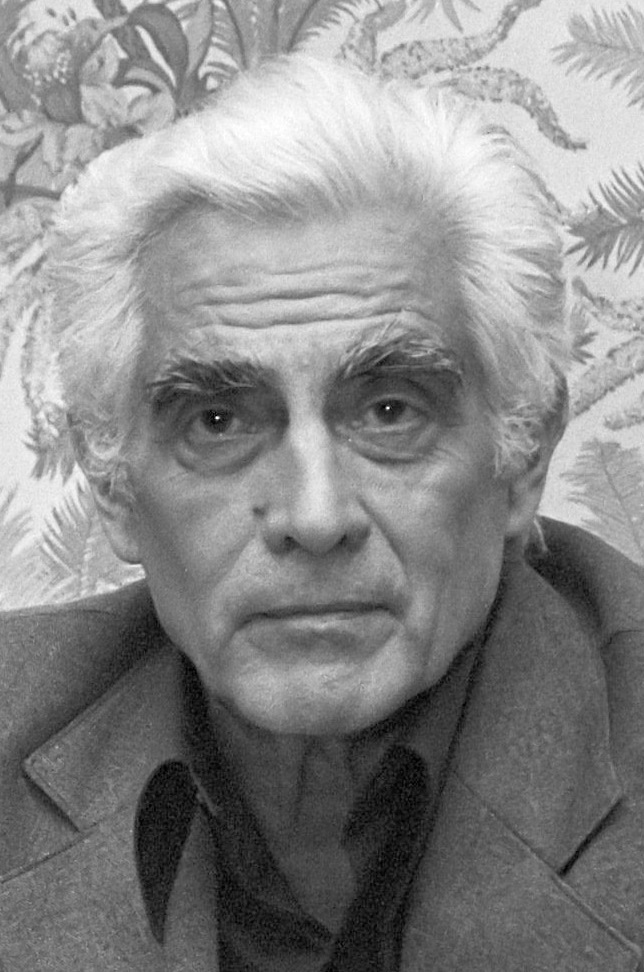

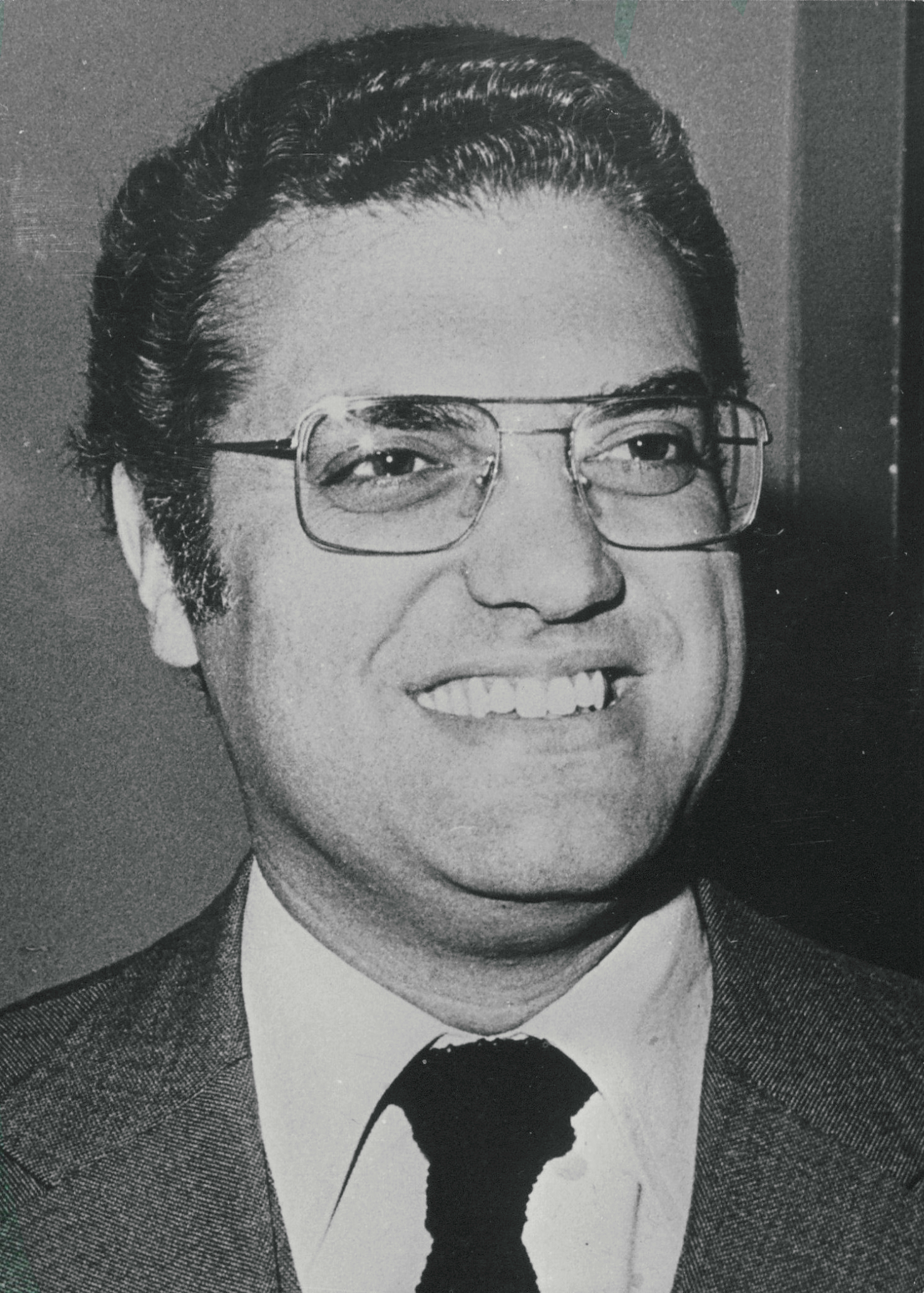
	First party	Second party
Leader	Mário Soares	Francisco Sá Carneiro
Party	PS	PSD
Popular vote	1,386,362	1,012,351
Percentage	33.2%	24.3%
Mayors	115	115
Councillors	691	623
	Third party	Fourth party
Leader	Álvaro Cunhal	Diogo Freitas do Amaral
Party	PCP	CDS
Alliance	FEPU
Popular vote	737,586	692,869
Percentage	17.7%	16.6%
Mayors	37	36
Councillors	267	317

Local elections were held in Portugal on Sunday, 12 December 1976. They were the first local elections in Portugal after the 1976 Constitution introduced the concept of democratic local power, that should be exerted by citizens in their towns and cities. These elections ended a cycle of three elections in 1976, after the legislative election in April and the Presidential election in June.

The elections were meant to elect for the first time the administration of the about 300 municipalities of the country and of the about 4000 parishes that composed those 300 municipalities. They consisted of three elections in each of the municipalities; the election for the municipal chamber, the election for the municipal assembly and the lower-level election for the parish assembly, whose winner is also automatically elected as President.

Before election day, Prime Minister Mário Soares suggested that if the Socialist Party (PS) achieved weak results, his cabinet would consider resigning. In the end, the PS gathered the majority of votes (33%) and mandates, beating the Social Democratic Party (24%), although both parties tied in number of elected mayors, each with 115. The Communists led coalition, the Electoral Front United People, dominated the election in the South of the country, with more than 17% of the votes and elected 37 mayors. The right-wing Democratic Social Center, following their strong showing in the 1976 April legislative election, achieved its best result ever in local elections, almost 17% of the votes and 36 mayors.

Turnout in these elections was quite low, as 64.6% of the electorate cast a ballot, compared with the 83.5% turnout rate of the 1976 general elections in April.

== Electoral system ==
All 304 municipalities are allocated a certain number of councilors to elect corresponding to the number of registered voters in a given municipality. Each party or coalition must present a list of candidates. The winner of the most voted list for the municipal council is automatically elected mayor, similar to first-past-the-post (FPTP). The lists are closed and the seats in each municipality are apportioned according to the D'Hondt method.

== Parties ==
The main political forces involved in the election:

- Democratic and Social Center (CDS)
- Electoral Front United People (FEPU)
- Groups for the Dinamization of the People's Unity (GDUPs)
- Socialist Party (PS)
- Social Democratic Party (PSD)

== Results ==
=== Municipal Councils ===
==== National summary of votes and seats ====
Summary of the 12 December 1976 Municipal Councils elections results
Parties	Votes	%	Candidacies	Councillors	Mayors
Parties	Votes	%	Candidacies	Total	Total
Socialist	1,386,362	33.24	296	691	115
Social Democratic	1,012,351	24.27	261	623	115
Electoral Front United People	737,586	17.69	287	267	37
Democratic and Social Centre	692,869	16.61	243	317	36
GDUPs	104,629	2.51	77	5	0
Portuguese Workers' Communist	27,399	0.66	58	0	0
PCP(m-l)	15,264	0.37	26	0	0
People's Monarchist	7,507	0.18	10	3	1
Internationalist Communist League	3,411	0.08	13	0	0
Workers' Revolutionary	282	0.03	1	0	0
**Total valid**	**3,987,660**	**95.61**	—	**1,906**	**304**
Blank ballots	89,544	2.15			
Invalid ballots	93,290	2.24			
**Total**	**4,170,494**	**100.00**			
Registered voters/turnout	6,457,440	64.55			

==== Municipality map ====
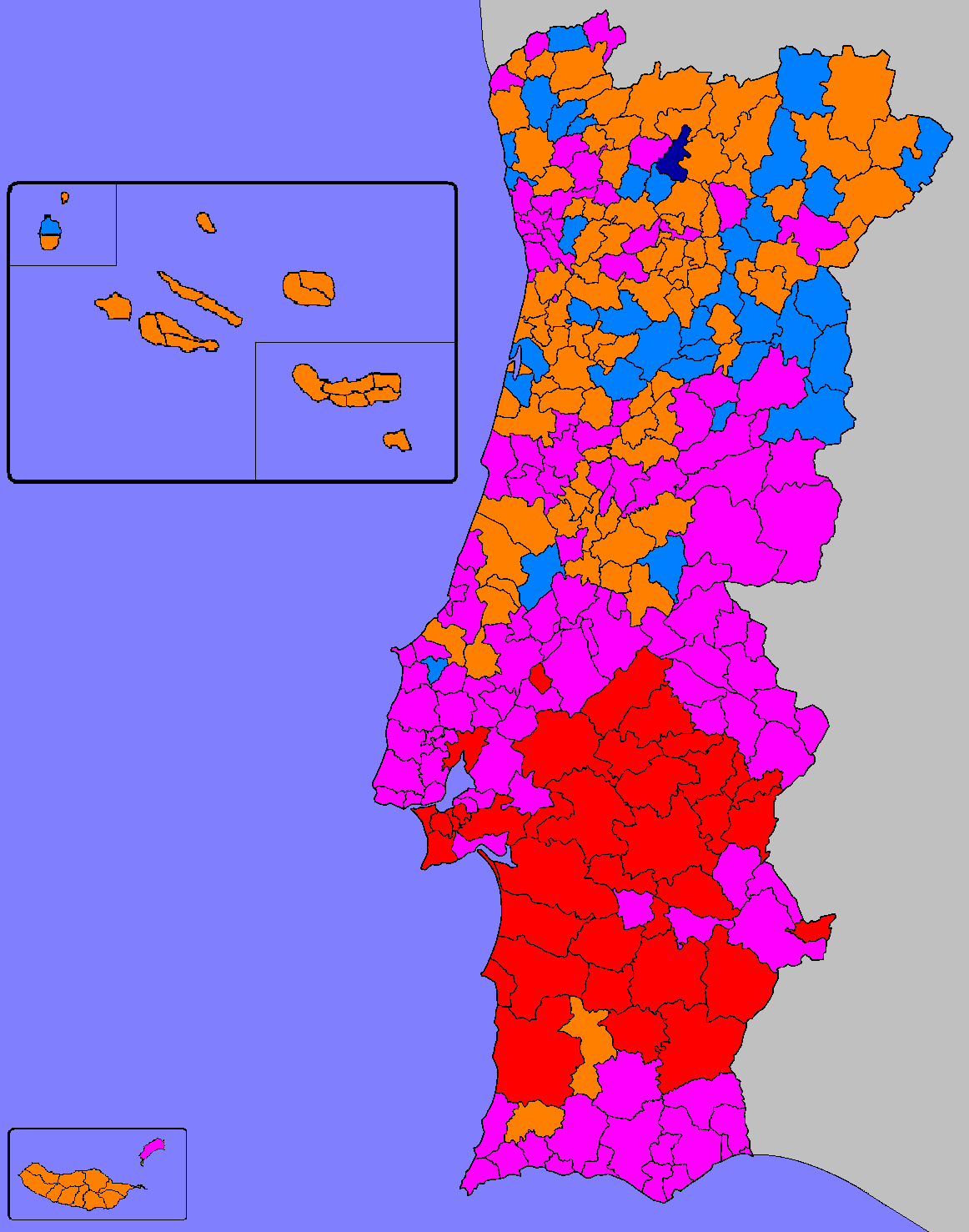
Most voted parties or coalitions in each Municipality. Municipalities won by: ■ - PS: 115 ■ - PSD: 115 ■ - FEPU: 37 ■ - CDS: 36 ■ - PPM: 1

==== City control ====
The following table lists party control in all district capitals, highlighted in bold, as well as in municipalities above 100,000 inhabitants. Population estimates from the 1970 Census.

Municipality	Population	New control
Almada	107,575	Electoral Front United People (FEPU)
**Aveiro**	49,808	Democratic and Social Centre (CDS)
**Beja**	36,384	Electoral Front United People (FEPU)
**Braga**	96,918	Socialist Party (PS)
**Bragança**	33,070	Social Democratic Party (PSD)
Cascais	92,907	Socialist Party (PS)
**Castelo Branco**	55,195	Socialist Party (PS)
**Coimbra**	110,553	Socialist Party (PS)
**Évora**	47,244	Electoral Front United People (FEPU)
**Faro**	30,973	Socialist Party (PS)
**Funchal**	101,810	Social Democratic Party (PSD)
Gondomar	105,075	Socialist Party (PS)
**Guarda**	39,741	Socialist Party (PS)
Guimarães	122,719	Socialist Party (PS)
**Leiria**	80,241	Social Democratic Party (PSD)
**Lisbon**	769,044	Socialist Party (PS)
Loures	166,167	Socialist Party (PS)
Matosinhos	109,225	Socialist Party (PS)
Oeiras	180,194	Socialist Party (PS)
**Ponta Delgada**	67,975	Social Democratic Party (PSD)
**Portalegre**	25,800	Socialist Party (PS)
**Porto**	301,655	Socialist Party (PS)
**Santarém**	56,440	Socialist Party (PS)
**Setúbal**	65,230	Socialist Party (PS)
Sintra	124,893	Socialist Party (PS)
**Viana do Castelo**	70,455	Social Democratic Party (PSD)
Vila Nova de Gaia	180,875	Socialist Party (PS)
**Vila Real**	44,550	Social Democratic Party (PSD)
**Viseu**	73,010	Democratic and Social Centre (CDS)

=== Municipal Assemblies ===
==== National summary of votes and seats ====
Summary of the 12 December 1976 Municipal Assemblies elections results
Parties	Votes	%	Candidacies	Mandates
Parties	Votes	%	Candidacies	Total
Socialist	1,389,980	33.33	291	1,701
Social Democratic	1,021,192	24.49	261	1,659
Electoral Front United People	756,337	18.14	285	674
Democratic and Social Centre	685,528	16.44	218	1,048
GDUPs	105,713	2.54	65	45
Portuguese Workers' Communist	5,033	0.12	10	0
People's Monarchist	3,694	0.09	3	3
Workers' Revolutionary	2,648	0.06	2	0
Christian Democratic	1,183	0.03	3	0
PCP(m-l)	169	0.00	1	0
**Total valid**	**3,971,477**	**95.24**	—	**5,130**
Blank ballots	104,146	2.50		
Invalid ballots	94,394	2.26		
**Total**	**4,170,017**	**100.00**		
Registered voters/turnout	6,457,440	64.55		

=== Parish Assemblies ===
==== National summary of votes and seats ====
Summary of the 12 December 1976 Parish Assemblies elections results
Parties	Votes	%	Candidacies	Mandates	Presidents
Parties	Votes	%	Candidacies	Total	Total
Socialist	1,349,191	33.21	2,510	8,364	1,104
Social Democratic	996,834	24.54	2,662	9,054	1,255
Electoral Front United People	637,442	15.69	1,115	2,328	197
Democratic and Social Centre	620,110	15.26	2,062	5,086	533
Independents	161,646	3.98	135	1,216	130
GDUPs	92,812	2.28	77	102	2
Portuguese Workers' Communist	13,715	0.34	106	2	0
PCP(m-l)	1,646	0.04	8	3	0
People's Monarchist	1,134	0.03	6	10	1
Internationalist Communist League	153	0.00	2	0	0
**Total valid**	**3,874,173**	**95.37**	—	**26,268**	**3,222**
Blank ballots	90,152	2.22			
Invalid ballots	97,766	2.41			
**Total**	**4,062,631**	**100.00**			
Registered voters/turnout	6,289,042	64.60			

=== Maps ===
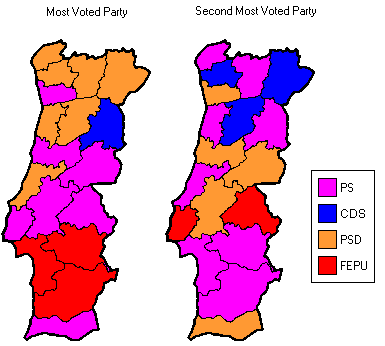
The first and the second most voted parties in Municipal Councils in each district. (Azores and Madeira are not shown)

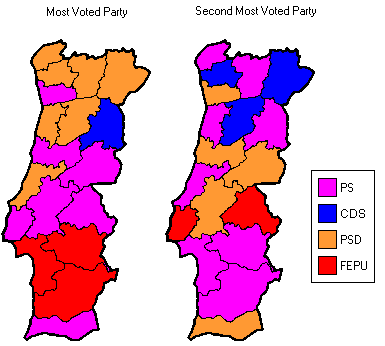
The first and the second most voted parties in Municipal Assemblies in sech district. (Azores and Madeira are not shown)

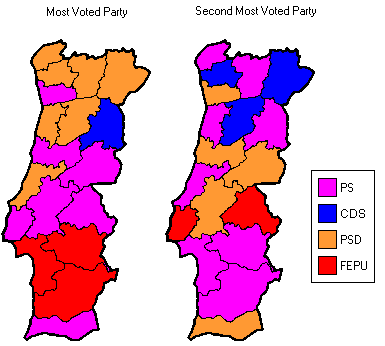
The first and the second most voted parties in Parish Assemblies in each district. (Azores and Madeira are not shown)

== Notes ==
- Electoral Front United People (FEPU) was composed by the Portuguese Communist Party (PCP), the Portuguese Democratic Movement (MDP/CDE) and the People's Socialist Front (FSP).
- The number of candidacies expresses the number of municipalities or parishes in which the party or coalition presented lists.
- The number of mandates expresses the number of municipal deputies in the Municipal Assembly election and the number of parish deputies in the Parish Assembly election.
- The turnout varies because one may choose not to vote for all the organs.

== See also ==
- Politics of Portugal
- List of political parties in Portugal
- Elections in Portugal
