= Workers Politics Communist Organisation =

Defunct Portuguese communist group

Workers Politics Communist Organisation (in Portuguese: Organização Comunista Política Operária) was a communist group in Portugal. OCPO was founded in September 1985, following a split from Communist Party (Reconstructed). OCPO published Política Operária whose editor was the late Francisco Martins Rodrigues.

In the early 1990s OCPO was dissolved, but the publication of PO as a bimonthly theoretical magazine has continued until Francisco Martins Rodrigues death in 2008. He died of cancer in Lisbon, Portugal, on April 22, 2008, at the age of 81. His funeral and cremation was held at the Cemitério do Alto São João.
