= Results breakdown of the 1976 Portuguese legislative election =

1976 Portuguese legislative election
- 25 April 1976
- All 263 seats in the Assembly of the Republic; 132 seats needed for a majority
- Turnout: 83.5%
Party	Leader	Vote %	Seats	+/–
PS	Mário Soares	34.9%	107	−9
PPD	Francisco Sá Carneiro	24.4%	73	−8
CDS	Diogo Freitas do Amaral	15.9%	42	+26
PCP	Álvaro Cunhal	14.4%	40	+10
UDP	Acácio Barreiros	1.7%	1	0
This lists parties that won seats. See the complete results below.
Prime Minister before	Prime Minister after
Vasco de Almeida e Costa (interim); Independent	Mário Soares; PS

This is the results breakdown of the Assembly of the Republic election held in Portugal on 25 April 1976. The following table show detailed results in each of the country's 24 electoral constituencies.

The PS was the most voted party, with nearly 35% and 107 seats, followed by PPD at 24% and 73 seats. CDS surpassed PCP to third place, with 16% and 42 seats, while PCP stood at 14% and 40 seats. Turnout decreased, compared with 1975, to 83.5%.

== Electoral system ==
The Assembly of the Republic had 263 members elected to four-year terms. The number of seats to be elected by each district depends on the district magnitude. 259 seats were allocated proportionally by the number of registered voters in the 20 Districts in Mainland Portugal, plus Azores, separated between Horta, Angra do Heroísmo and Ponta Delgada, and Madeira (Funchal), and 4 fixed seats are allocated for overseas voters, 2 seats for voters in Europe and another 2 seats for voters Outside Europe.

The 263 members of Parliament were elected using the D'Hondt method and by a closed list proportional representation system. Members represent the country as a whole and not the constituencies in which they were elected.

== Results by constituency ==
Constituency	Seats	Electorate	Turnout	Party	Votes	Seats won
Angra do Heroísmo	2	51,739	40,595	Democratic People's Party	21,029	1
Angra do Heroísmo	2	51,739	40,595	Socialist Party	12,334	1
Angra do Heroísmo	2	51,739	40,595	Democratic and Social Centre	4,910	-
Angra do Heroísmo	2	51,739	40,595	Portuguese Communist Party	591	-
Angra do Heroísmo	2	51,739	40,595	Movement of Socialist Left	456	-
Aveiro	15	381,918	323,117	Democratic People's Party	113,595	6
Aveiro	15	381,918	323,117	Socialist Party	99,647	5
Aveiro	15	381,918	323,117	Democratic and Social Centre	72,638	4
Aveiro	15	381,918	323,117	Portuguese Communist Party	11,962	-
Beja	6	143,333	120,125	Portuguese Communist Party	52,839	4
Beja	6	143,333	120,125	Socialist Party	38,405	2
Beja	6	143,333	120,125	Democratic People's Party	9,882	-
Beja	6	143,333	120,125	Democratic and Social Centre	5,004	-
Beja	6	143,333	120,125	Popular Democratic Union	2,671	-
Beja	6	143,333	120,125	Movement of Socialist Left	2,092	-
Beja	6	143,333	120,125	People's Socialist Front	1,564	-
Braga	15	51,739	40,595	Socialist Party	110,586	6
Braga	15	51,739	40,595	Democratic People's Party	97,886	5
Braga	15	51,739	40,595	Democratic and Social Centre	86,148	4
Braga	15	51,739	40,595	Portuguese Communist Party	14,202	-
Braga	15	51,739	40,595	Popular Democratic Union	3,527	-
Bragança	5	122,980	95,144	Democratic People's Party	31,636	2
Bragança	5	122,980	95,144	Democratic and Social Centre	26,927	2
Bragança	5	122,980	95,144	Socialist Party	21,514	1
Bragança	5	122,980	95,144	Portuguese Communist Party	2,530	-
Bragança	5	122,980	95,144	People's Socialist Front	1,003	-
Castelo Branco	7	176,159	142,266	Socialist Party	51,822	3
Castelo Branco	7	176,159	142,266	Democratic People's Party	32,212	2
Castelo Branco	7	176,159	142,266	Democratic and Social Centre	28,257	2
Castelo Branco	7	176,159	142,266	Portuguese Communist Party	9,369	-
Castelo Branco	7	176,159	142,266	People's Socialist Front	1,708	-
Castelo Branco	7	176,159	142,266	Popular Democratic Union	1,520	-
Coimbra	12	310,085	240,085	Socialist Party	98,162	6
Coimbra	12	310,085	240,085	Democratic People's Party	64,162	2
Coimbra	12	310,085	240,085	Democratic and Social Centre	29,967	1
Coimbra	12	310,085	240,085	Portuguese Communist Party	17,405	1
Coimbra	12	310,085	240,085	Popular Democratic Union	2,771	-
Évora	6	137,049	121,196	Portuguese Communist Party	52,291	4
Évora	6	137,049	121,196	Socialist Party	36,679	2
Évora	6	137,049	121,196	Democratic People's Party	11,107	-
Évora	6	137,049	121,196	Democratic and Social Centre	9,645	-
Évora	6	137,049	121,196	Popular Democratic Union	3,151	-
Évora	6	137,049	121,196	People's Socialist Front	1,491	-
Faro	9	236,744	191,160	Socialist Party	85,313	6
Faro	9	236,744	191,160	Democratic People's Party	36,906	2
Faro	9	236,744	191,160	Portuguese Communist Party	27,667	1
Faro	9	236,744	191,160	Democratic and Social Centre	13,010	-
Faro	9	236,744	191,160	Popular Democratic Union	4,928	-
Faro	9	236,744	191,160	People's Socialist Front	3,839	-
Faro	9	236,744	191,160	Reorganizing Movement of the Party of the Proletariat	1,957	-
Funchal	6	143,461	114,859	Democratic People's Party	60,925	4
Funchal	6	143,461	114,859	Socialist Party	28,645	1
Funchal	6	143,461	114,859	Democratic and Social Centre	15,310	1
Funchal	6	143,461	114,859	Portuguese Communist Party	1,667	-
Funchal	6	143,461	114,859	Popular Democratic Union	1,492	-
Funchal	6	143,461	114,859	Christian Democratic Party	1,412	-
Guarda	6	148,574	122,076	Democratic and Social Centre	39,120	2
Guarda	6	148,574	122,076	Democratic People's Party	31,307	2
Guarda	6	148,574	122,076	Socialist Party	30,746	2
Guarda	6	148,574	122,076	Portuguese Communist Party	3,583	-
Guarda	6	148,574	122,076	People's Socialist Front	1,717	-
Guarda	6	148,574	122,076	Christian Democratic Party	1,668	-
Guarda	6	148,574	122,076	Popular Democratic Union	1,368	-
Guarda	6	148,574	122,076	Movement of Socialist Left	1,200	-
Horta	1	26,058	21,289	Democratic People's Party	12,141	1
Horta	1	26,058	21,289	Socialist Party	7,278	-
Horta	1	26,058	21,289	Democratic and Social Centre	919	-
Horta	1	26,058	21,289	Portuguese Communist Party	328	-
Leiria	11	277,582	222,752	Democratic People's Party	69,457	4
Leiria	11	277,582	222,752	Socialist Party	69,236	4
Leiria	11	277,582	222,752	Democratic and Social Centre	43,213	2
Leiria	11	277,582	222,752	Portuguese Communist Party	16,226	1
Leiria	11	277,582	222,752	Popular Democratic Union	2,136	-
Lisbon	58	1,431,819	1,197,789	Socialist Party	458,713	25
Lisbon	58	1,431,819	1,197,789	Portuguese Communist Party	260,554	14
Lisbon	58	1,431,819	1,197,789	Democratic People's Party	196,031	10
Lisbon	58	1,431,819	1,197,789	Democratic and Social Centre	157,554	8
Lisbon	58	1,431,819	1,197,789	Popular Democratic Union	31,409	1
Lisbon	58	1,431,819	1,197,789	Reorganizing Movement of the Party of the Proletariat	14,372	-
Ponta Delgada	6	85,101	65,242	Democratic People's Party	29,796	2
Ponta Delgada	6	85,101	65,242	Socialist Party	23,124	1
Ponta Delgada	6	85,101	65,242	Democratic and Social Centre	7,708	-
Ponta Delgada	6	85,101	65,242	Portuguese Communist Party	952	-
Portalegre	4	110,543	96,056	Socialist Party	40,238	3
Portalegre	4	110,543	96,056	Portuguese Communist Party	21,135	1
Portalegre	4	110,543	96,056	Democratic and Social Centre	13,375	-
Portalegre	4	110,543	96,056	Democratic People's Party	9,680	-
Portalegre	4	110,543	96,056	People's Socialist Front	1,004	-
Portalegre	4	110,543	96,056	Popular Democratic Union	949	-
Portalegre	4	110,543	96,056	Movement of Socialist Left	934	-
Porto	38	936,819	827,194	Socialist Party	336,960	18
Porto	38	936,819	827,194	Democratic People's Party	222,974	11
Porto	38	936,819	827,194	Democratic and Social Centre	129,732	6
Porto	38	936,819	827,194	Portuguese Communist Party	69,176	3
Porto	38	936,819	827,194	Popular Democratic Union	12,590	-
Santarém	13	325,169	271,902	Socialist Party	104,422	6
Santarém	13	325,169	271,902	Democratic People's Party	53,138	3
Santarém	13	325,169	271,902	Portuguese Communist Party	43,841	2
Santarém	13	325,169	271,902	Democratic and Social Centre	37,699	2
Santarém	13	325,169	271,902	Popular Democratic Union	4,533	-
Santarém	13	325,169	271,902	People's Socialist Front	3,040	-
Setúbal	17	423,293	358,675	Portuguese Communist Party	159,087	9
Setúbal	17	423,293	358,675	Socialist Party	115,352	7
Setúbal	17	423,293	358,675	Democratic People's Party	30,142	1
Setúbal	17	423,293	358,675	Democratic and Social Centre	15,724	-
Setúbal	17	423,293	358,675	Popular Democratic Union	10,057	-
Setúbal	17	423,293	358,675	People's Socialist Front	3,467	-
Viana do Castelo	7	163,949	129,750	Democratic People's Party	42,519	3
Viana do Castelo	7	163,949	129,750	Socialist Party	33,094	2
Viana do Castelo	7	163,949	129,750	Democratic and Social Centre	30,437	2
Viana do Castelo	7	163,949	129,750	Portuguese Communist Party	8,611	-
Viana do Castelo	7	163,949	129,750	People's Socialist Front	1,314	-
Vila Real	7	166,189	130,133	Democratic People's Party	50,736	4
Vila Real	7	166,189	130,133	Socialist Party	34,277	2
Vila Real	7	166,189	130,133	Democratic and Social Centre	23,808	1
Vila Real	7	166,189	130,133	Portuguese Communist Party	4,086	-
Viseu	11	277,780	217,772	Democratic People's Party	70,159	4
Viseu	11	277,780	217,772	Democratic and Social Centre	67,864	4
Viseu	11	277,780	217,772	Socialist Party	50,033	3
Viseu	11	277,780	217,772	Portuguese Communist Party	4,954	-
Viseu	11	277,780	217,772	Christian Democratic Party	2,342	-
Viseu	11	277,780	217,772	People's Monarchist Party	2,093	-
Europe	2	57,341	51,693	Socialist Party	23,824	1
Europe	2	57,341	51,693	Democratic People's Party	16,644	1
Europe	2	57,341	51,693	Portuguese Communist Party	5,212	-
Europe	2	57,341	51,693	Democratic and Social Centre	3,555	-
Rest of the World	2	48,368	40,047	Democratic People's Party	21,317	1
Rest of the World	2	48,368	40,047	Democratic and Social Centre	13,483	1
Rest of the World	2	48,368	40,047	Socialist Party	2,517	-
Rest of the World	2	48,368	40,047	Christian Democratic Party	1,277	-
Rest of the World	2	48,368	40,047	Portuguese Communist Party	562	-
Source: Comissão Nacional de Eleições
