= Liberal Social Movement (Portugal) =

The Liberal Social Movement (Portuguese: Movimento Liberal Social) is a liberal political organisation in Portugal.

The Liberal Social Movement (or MLS for short) was founded in 2005 and has as objective to promote social liberalism in Portugal. The movement is a platform of individuals who believe that the old left/right "dogma" makes little sense today. They support economic liberalism as well as individual rights and a liberal progressive stance on social issues.

MLS is ideologically close to the European Liberal Democrats (the third biggest political force in the European Parliament).

== Declaration of Principles ==
In brief, this is what MLS stands for:

- The sovereignty of the individual: the inalienable right to live one’s life and to seek happiness;
- A more just society, regulated by merit, where all can freely exercise their talents and develop their potential, free from any control or pressure in an environment of solidarity and respect between individuals;
- Equality in front of the law, always with respect for the right to differ;
- A state that is reduced to the essential minimum but that assures (in a sustainable way and following the subsidiarity principle) the defence of the individual and society, private property, Justice, the existence of basic health and social security services, high quality education and the protection of cultural and environmental heritage;
- Market economy, but always under state control, as corrective element of the inevitable disequilibria.

In terms of concrete policies MLS strives for:

- A deepening of the European Union, but with increased powers of the democratically elected bodies (e.g. European Parliament), under strict respect of the subsidiarity principles;
- A reduction of the tax burden, but with a strong hand against perpetrators;
- Policies that stimulate innovation and private initiative;
- Strong protection of the environment;
- A state that keeps its distance from private life, legalising soft drugs, abortion during the first weeks of pregnancy, gay marriage, euthanasia, prostitution between adults and many other areas where the state tries presently to interfere, but which should belong to the intimate decision of the individual;
- The use of military force only as a last resort, always using peaceful means till the last effort to resolve possible international conflicts;
- A strict separation between State and Church, as the only guarantee of a true freedom of religion;
- A high-quality education that everyone has access to;
- A social security system that protects the individual from the occasionally inevitable setbacks of life, but that would not be an incentive for non-productivity;
- An urgent improvement of the efficiency and effectiveness of Justice;
- The abolition of all discrimination based on race, skin colour, religion, political ideas, sexual orientation or gender.

== See also ==
- List of political parties in Portugal
