= Proletarian Communist Organization (Marxist–Bolshevik) of Portugal =

Proletarian Communist Organization (Marxist–Bolshevik) of Portugal (in Portuguese: Organização Comunista Proletária (Marxista-Bolchevique) de Portugal) was a small communist organization in Portugal. OCP(MB)P was born in 1994, following a split in the Communist Party (Reconstructed). The founders of OCP(MB)P opposed the merger of PC(R) into the UDP. OCP(MB)P publishes 1º de Maio Vermelho (Red 1 May).
