= António Pinto Pereira =

Portuguese politician

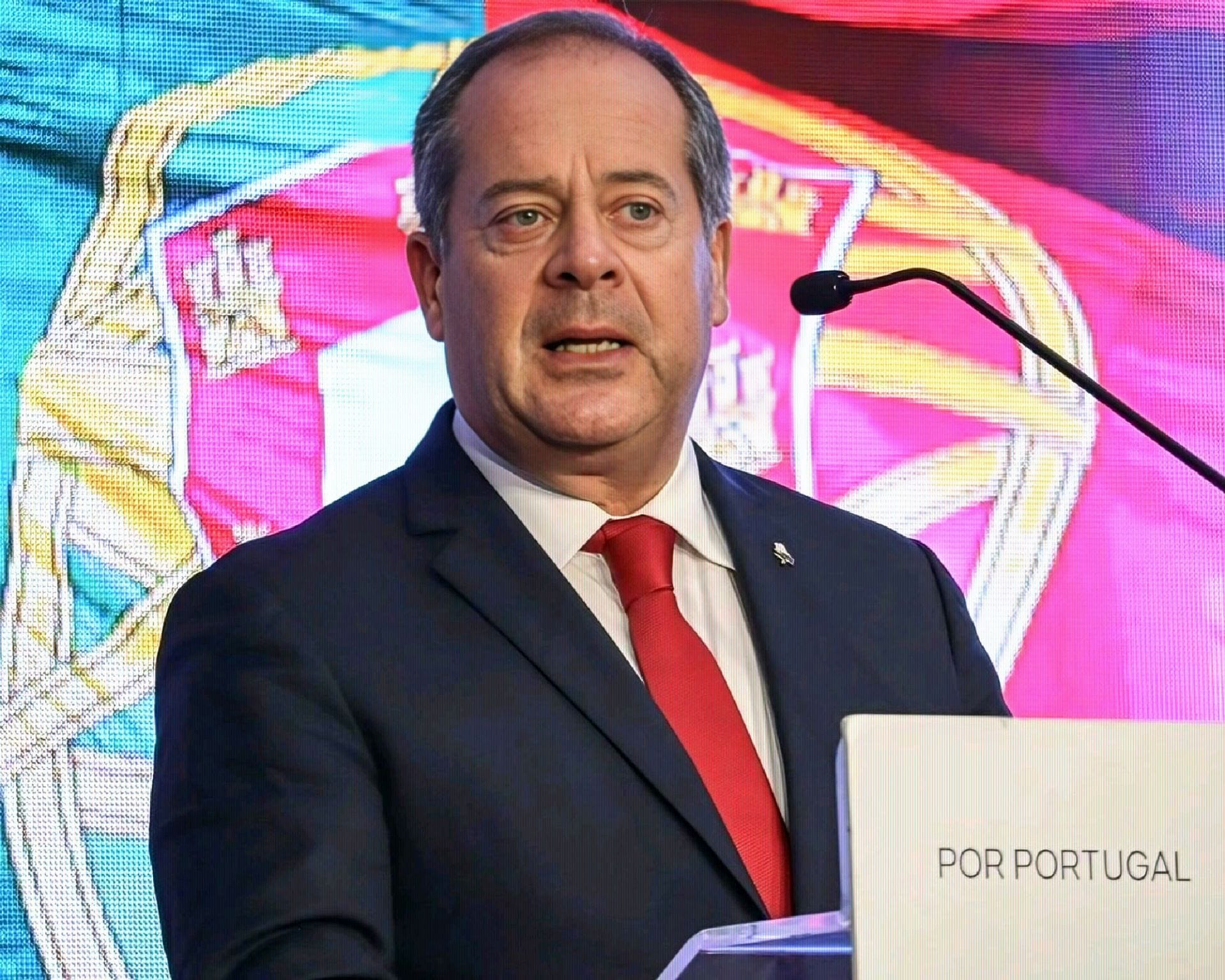

Member of the Assembly of the Republic
- In office 26 March 2024 – 18 May 2025
- Constituency: Coimbra

Personal details
- Born: António José Cerejo Pinto Pereira; 26 August 1964 (age 62) Luanda, Portuguese Angola
- Citizenship: Portugal
- Party: Nova Direita (since 2025)
- Other political affiliations: PSD (until 2023); Chega (2023–2025)
- Children: 4
- Education: University of Lisbon

António José Cerejo Pinto Pereira (born 26 August 1964) is a Portuguese lawyer, professor, media commentator and politician of the Chega who has served as a member of the Assembly of the Republic for the Coimbra constituency since 2024.

== Biography ==
Pereira was born in Luanda in 1964 to a Portuguese Angolan family. He moved to Portugal where he completed a bachelor's and a master's degree in law before graduating with a PhD in international relations. He then worked as an assistant professor of law at the Instituto Superior de Ciências Sociais e Políticas before becoming a legal correspondent and commentator on the Você na TV current affairs show.

In January 2024, it was announced by the Chega party that Pereira would lead the party list for the Coimbra constituency for the 2024 Portuguese legislative election. He was successful at winning the seat and was elected to the XVI Legislature of the Portuguese Republic.
