= Renata Cambra =

Portuguese politician

- Born: 1991; São João da Madeira
- Occupation: Politician
- Political party: Workers United (Portugal)

Renata Coutinho de Almeida Cambra (São João da Madeira, 23 June 1991) is a Portuguese teacher and politician. She currently teaches at Amadora and is a spokesperson for the Workers United party. Previously she led the Socialist Alternative Movement (MAS) in Lisbon where she gained particular notoriety as a candidate during the televised debates by RTP during the 2022 Portuguese legislative election. Recently she has been involved in the ongoing Portuguese housing protests, having won an appeal in court to the Administrative Court of the Lisbon Circle allowing protesters to continue their encampments in Rossio.

== Education and political activity ==
Renata Cambra studied Portuguese at the Faculty of Arts of the University of Coimbra, where she was elected a member of the Pedagogical Council. She was also part of the Arts Students' Association and the Statutes Revision Assembly of the Academic Association of Coimbra (AAC). In 2011, as a member of the Left Bloc (BE) and an activist with the Student Action Front (FAE), she led the "Indigna-te" ticket in the elections for the General Directorate of the AAC. That year she was also, like Gil Garcia and André Pestana, a signatory of "Motion C - Changing Course, for a 100% Left-Wing Left Bloc", in opposition to the motion of the leadership, headed by Francisco Louçã, at the VII National Convention of the Left Bloc. In 2012, she participated in the public debate inaugurating the Ruptura/FER headquarters in Coimbra, on the theme "Why is a New Left-Wing Party Necessary? Why is it Necessary to Fight Austerity?", when the current was preparing to leave to found the MAS.

In 2019, after a six-year period outside of Portugal, during which she taught Portuguese in Germany and remained away from political activity, Renata Cambra resumed her political activity in the MAS party and in various social movements, She was involved in the Student Climate Strike movements, the United Antifascist Network and the March 8th Network, as well as the Union of All Education Professionals (STOP). In 2019, she was included in the MAS candidate list for the European Parliament elections, ranking 11th, and was also their lead candidate for the Porto constituency in the legislative elections of that year. In 2021, MAS announced that Renata Cambra would be its spokesperson and head of the ticket for Lisbon in the 2022 legislative elections.

== Court case against Mário Machado and Ricardo Pais ==
In 2022, about a month after the legislative elections, Renata Cambra, represented by lawyer António Garcia Pereira, she filed a criminal complaint against Mário Machado and Ricardo Pais for inciting sexual violence against left-wing women and against her specifically, with Pais stating on social media that she would receive "VIP treatment" in a context of "forced prostitution" to "motivate the troops in the reconquest". Subsequently, the Public Prosecutor's Office (MP) filed charges of discrimination and incitement to hatred and violence against women from left-wing parties and, in particular, against Renata Cambra, who publicly announced that she would proceed with her own complaint and request for civil damages.

In May 2024, the District Court sentenced Mário Machado to two years and ten months of effective imprisonment and Ricardo Pais to one year and eight months of suspended imprisonment for the crimes of discrimination and incitement to hatred and violence. They were also sentenced to a social reintegration plan focused on human rights, gender equality, and freedom and self-determination. Ricardo Pais was also ordered to pay 750 euros to the Portuguese Association for Victim Support (APAV). Following an appeal by the defendants, the Court of Justice confirmed these sentences in December 2024.

== Workers United ==
In September 2024, Renata Cambra announced the creation of a new political party under the name United Workers (TU). The decision was made following internal disagreements within MAS, including differences with founder Gil Garcia, which led to Cambra's departure accompanied by a group of activists. According to public statements, TU intends to position itself as an independent force, critical of the actions of sectors of the left that it considers too close to the Socialist Party (PS), advocating a firmer opposition.

The official launch of TU took place on September 21, 2024, in Lisbon. The party presents itself as a new political proposal focused on the issues of the working class and youth. Its criticisms encompass the main parties of the political center, such as PS and PSD, as well as the rise of the far right. Among the measures it proposes are raising the minimum wage to €1,000, reducing the working week to 35 hours without loss of pay, and controlling the prices of essential goods. The TU also values involvement in social and trade union struggles as an integral part of its political practice.

Ideologically, the party takes an openly xenophilic stance on immigration, proposing the "immediate regularization of all undocumented immigrants, with documents for all and full access to social and political rights". In the field of foreign policy, the TU advocates "Portugal's immediate withdrawal from NATO", expressing opposition "to the militarization of the EU and the Fortress Europe project". Regarding the war in Ukraine, the party states that it defends "Ukraine's right to fight against the Russian occupation and to maintain its independence," but declares itself "against the Zelensky regime".

== Housing crisis protests ==
Renata Cambra has been part of and a spokesperson of a series of protests in Lisbon against the housing crisis, which have been met with police violence. On 2 November, the Administrative Court of the Lisbon Circle agreed with the summons presented by Renata Cambra. The court stated that it was allowed for protesters to set up their tents in Rossio even after 00:30 am, a point which police had used to justify their violent interventions. A lawyer of the protesters sad that the police "has to start to behave in accordance with the law and the Constitution, just as the protesters also have to make their right, which has now been recognized, to demonstrate, compatible with all the others".
