= Martim Syder =

Portuguese politician (born 1995)

Member of the Assembly of the Republic
- Incumbent
- Assumed office 26 March 2024
- Constituency: Coimbra

Personal details
- Born: 11 May 1995 (age 30)
- Party: Social Democratic Party

Martim Arnaut Syder (born 11 May 1995) is a Portuguese politician serving as a member of the Assembly of the Republic since 2024. He has been a member of the NATO Parliamentary Assembly since 2024.
