= Manuel da Costa Andrade =

Portuguese judge

His Excellency Manuel da Costa Andrade GCC GOIH
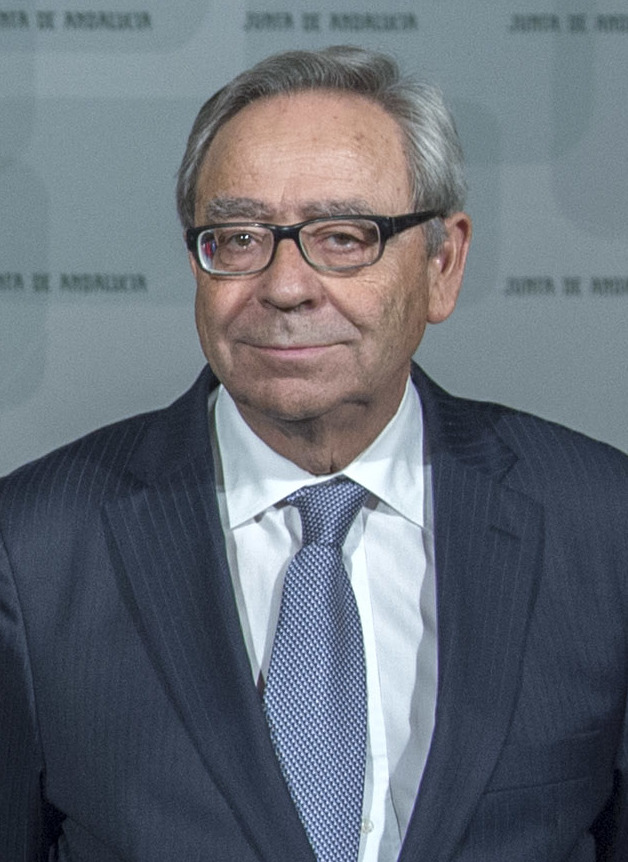

President of the Constitutional Court
- In office 27 July 2016 – 12 February 2021
- Preceded by: Joaquim Sousa Ribeiro
- Succeeded by: João Caupers

Councilor of State
- In office 29 September 2016 – 17 February 2021
- President: Marcelo Rebelo de Sousa

Member of the Assembly of the Republic Elections: 1976, 1980, 1983, 1985, 1987, 1991
- In office 3 June 1976 – 26 October 1995
- Constituency: Bragança (1976–1980); Coimbra (1980–1995)

Member of the Constituent Assembly Election: 1975
- In office 2 June 1975 – 2 April 1976
- Constituency: Bragança

Personal details
- Born: 8 October 1944 (age 81) Carção, Vimioso, Portugal
- Party: Social Democratic Party
- Education: University of Coimbra
- Profession: Jurist; Professor

Manuel da Costa Andrade GCC GOIH (born 8 October 1944) is a Portuguese judge who served as President of the Constitutional Court and ex officio Councilor of State from 2016 to 2021. He is a Professor Emeritus of the Faculty of Law of the University of Coimbra.

Manuel da Costa Andrade obtained his law degree from the Faculty of Law of the University of Coimbra in 1970, pursuing a career in academica. He concluded his Doctorate in Criminal Law Science (Ciências Jurídico-Criminais) in 1990, having taught and published several works on the subject of criminal law, criminal procedure, and criminology.

Costa Andrade served as a member of the Constituent Assembly, the parliament convened in 1975–76 for the purpose of drafting a constitution for the Third Portuguese Republic, following the Carnation Revolution. Affiliated with the Social Democratic Party, he went on to serve as a Member of the Assembly of the Republic from 1976 to 1995.

On 20 July 2016, he was elected Justice of the Constitutional Court by the Assembly of the Republic. On 22 July, he was elected by his peers, 7th President of the Constitutional Court. By virtue of his office, he became a Councilor of State, sworn in at Belém Palace on 29 September 2016. He was succeeded by João Caupers in 2021.

== Distinctions ==
=== National orders ===
- Grand Cross of the Military Order of Christ (12 February 2021)
- Grand Officer of the Order of Prince Henry the Navigator (8 June 2009)
