= Revolutionary Young Communist League =

Revolutionary Young Communist League (in Portuguese: União da Juventude Comunista Revolucionária, UJCR) was the youth league of the Portuguese Communist Party (Reconstructed).
