= Raquel Ferreira (politician) =

Portuguese politician (born 1969)

Raquel de Fátima Cardoso Ferreira

Member of the Assembly of the Republic
- In office February 2020 – 2 June 2025
- Constituency: Coimbra

Personal details
- Born: 16 July 1969 (age 56)
- Party: Portuguese: Socialist Party (PS)
- Spouse: José António Oliveira Ramos
- Occupation: Politician and lawyer

Raquel de Fátima Cardoso Ferreira (born 1969) is a Portuguese politician and lawyer. She has been a deputy in the Assembly of the Republic since February 2020 as a member of the Socialist Party (PS), representing the Coimbra constituency.

== Early life and education ==
Ferreira was born on 16 July 1969. She obtained a degree in law, a diploma in civil law, and post-graduate qualifications in social reintegration. From 1998 she worked as a lawyer in Figueira da Foz, a coastal municipality in the Coimbra District of Portugal.

== Political career ==
Ferreira became a member of the PS in Figueira da Foz and in October 2022 became the leader of the party in the municipality. She has also been active in the Socialist Women group in the party.

She became a deputy in the National Assembly following the death of João Ataíde, who had also been president of the Figueira da Foz council until his death. In the 2022 national election, in which the PS won an overall majority, she was fourth on the list of the party's candidates and the PS won four of the available nine seats. In the March 2024 election, called after the resignation of prime minister António Costa following allegations of corruption against members of his government, she was again fourth on the list and was elected, although nationally the PS performed less well than in 2022. She became a member of the Energy and Environment Committee of the parliament.
