= Marxist–Leninist Committee of Portugal =

Portuguese communist organization

Marxist–Leninist Committee of Portugal (in Portuguese: Comité Marxista-Leninista de Portugal), formed around 1970, was a clandestine communist organization in Portugal. CMLdeP had its roots in the Portuguese Marxist-Leninist Committee. The group published O Bolchevista.
