= Workers United (Portugal) =

Workers United Trabalhadores Unidos
- Abbreviation: TU
- Founder: Renata Cambra
- Founded: September 2024; 2 years ago
- Registered: 22 July 2026; 3 months ago
- Split from: Socialist Alternative Movement
- Ideology: Revolutionary socialism; Trotskyism
- International affiliation: International Workers' Unity – Fourth International
- Colours: Purple
- Assembly of the Republic: 0 / 230
- European Parliament: 0 / 21
- Regional parliaments: 0 / 104
- Local government: 0 / 2,074

Website
- trabalhadores-unidos.pt

Workers United (Portuguese: Trabalhadores Unidos; TU) is a political party from Portugal founded by Renata Cambra, former spokesperson of the Socialist Alternative Movement, who left the party over a leadership dispute. The party identifies itself as a socialist and revolutionary alternative to the other left-wing parties in the Assembly of the Republic.

After founding the party in September 2024, the party was finally legalized in July 2026 by the Constitutional Court.
