= Paulo Seco =

Portuguese politician

Member of the Assembly of the Republic
- Incumbent
- Assumed office 3 June 2025
- Constituency: Coimbra

Personal details
- Party: Chega

Paulo Jorge Rodrigues Nogueira Seco is a Portuguese politician who was elected member of the Assembly of the Republic in 2025. He is the president of Chega in the Coimbra District.
