= Pedro Coimbra =

Portuguese politician (born 1973)

Member of the Assembly of the Republic
- Incumbent
- Assumed office 23 October 2015
- Constituency: Coimbra
- In office 5 April 2002 – 9 March 2005
- Constituency: Coimbra

Personal details
- Born: 1 April 1973 (age 53)
- Party: Socialist Party

Pedro Artur Barreirinhas Sales Guedes Coimbra (born 1 April 1973) is a Portuguese politician. He has been a member of the Assembly of the Republic since 2015, having previously served from 2002 to 2005. From 2012 to 2020, he served as president of the Socialist Party in the Coimbra District.
