= Communist Union for the Reconstruction of the Party (Marxist–Leninist) =

Communist Union for the Reconstruction of the Party (marxist-leninist) (in Portuguese: União Comunista para a reconstituição do partido (marxista-leninista)) was a communist group in Portugal led by Afonso Gonçalves da Rocha. UCRP (ml) was founded in 1975 after a split from the Portuguese Marxist-Leninist Communist Organization (OCMLP).

UCRP (ml) published O Comunista.

In 1978 UCRP (ml) founded the Portuguese (marxist-leninist) Communist Party (P (ml) CP).
