= Electoral Front United People =

Electoral Front United People Frente Eleitoral Povo Unido
- Founded: 30 September 1976
- Dissolved: 1978
- Succeeded by: United People Alliance
- Ideology: Communism; Marxism–Leninism; Socialism
- Member parties: Portuguese Communist Party; Portuguese Democratic Movement; People's Socialist Front

The Electoral Front United People (Portuguese: Frente Eleitoral Povo Unido or FEPU), was an electoral front of the Portuguese Communist Party, the Portuguese Democratic Movement/Electoral Democratic Commissions and the People's Socialist Front formed in order to participate in the Portuguese local election of 1976. The FEPU got 718,006 votes (17.2%).
