= Portuguese Marxist–Leninist Committee =

Communist organisation in Portugal

Portuguese Marxist-Leninist Committee Comité Marxista-Leninista Português
- Abbreviation: CMLP
- Founder: Francisco Martins Rodrigues
- Founded: 1964
- Dissolved: 1970
- Succeeded by: PCP (M–L); OCMLP
- Ideology: Communism; Marxism–Leninism; Maoism; Anti-revisionism
- Political position: Far-left

Portuguese Marxist–Leninist Committee (in Portuguese: Comité Marxista-Leninista Português) was an anti-revisionist Marxist–Leninist communist party in Portugal. CM-LP was formed in March 1964 by a group led by Francisco Martins Rodrigues. Martins, who was a Central Committee Member of the Portuguese Communist Party, had split from PCP in January the same year. CM-LP was formed after the formation of the Popular Action Front, which existed parallel to CM-LP.CM-LP published Revolução Popular.

In 1965 most of the leadership of CM-LP was imprisoned. In 1968 one section, representing most of the leadership that was not jailed, started the publication O Comunista. This group later merged into the Portuguese Marxist–Leninist Communist Organization (OCMLP).

In 1969 a second conference of another tendency is held inside Portugal, through the initiative of Eduíno Vilar. They started publishing Unidade Popular in March 1969. In 1970 they formed the Communist Party of Portugal (Marxist-Leninist).

In 1975 the PUP retook the name CM-LP.

== See also ==
- List of anti-revisionist groups
