= Portuguese Democratic Labour Party =

Centre-left political party in Portugal

Portuguese Democratic Labour Party (in Portuguese: Partido Trabalhista Democrático Português) was a centre-left political party in Portugal. PTDP was founded on 3 May 1974, the first political party to be formed after the Carnation Revolution.
