= Fausto Correia =

Portuguese politician (1951–2007)

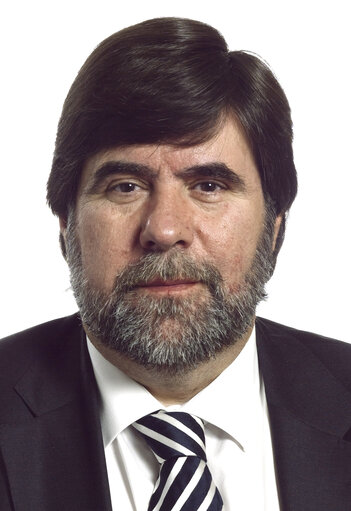
Fausto Correia

Fausto de Sousa Correia (October 29, 1951 – 9 October 2007) was a Portuguese politician, deputy of the Portuguese Parliament, and Member of the European Parliament (MEP) for the Socialist Party; part of the Party of European Socialists.

== Biography ==
Born and raised in Coimbra, Fausto Correia earned a degree in law from the University of Coimbra. In his early years, Correia worked as a journalist, including at the newspaper República.

He joined the Socialist Party in 1973. He also became a member of the Grand Orient of Portugal.

He also served as chairman of the Associação Académica de Coimbra - O.A.F. (in 1995), the major football club of Coimbra, and Rádio e Televisão de Portugal, the state-managed public radio network of Portugal.

As a member of the Portuguese Government headed by Prime-Minister António Guterres, in the early 2000s Correia played a major part in the establishment of the Loja do Cidadão (The Citizen's Shop), a one-stop-shop intended to improve quality in public services, and aimed to develop a new philosophy of more efficient and modern public service throughout the major cities of Portugal.

He was elected as a candidate of the Socialist Party to the European Parliament in the 2004 European Parliament elections. He continued to live and work in Belgium as a member of the European Parliament for the rest of his life.

== Death ==
He died of a heart attack on 9 October 2007, in Brussels. Politicians from across the Portuguese political landscape offered their condolences and praised Correira. Portuguese Prime Minister José Sócrates called him "one of the most outstanding leaders of the [Socialist Party]".
