= Associação Portuguesa de Apoio à Vítima =

Portuguese Association for Victim Support
- Associação Portuguesa de Apoio à Vítima
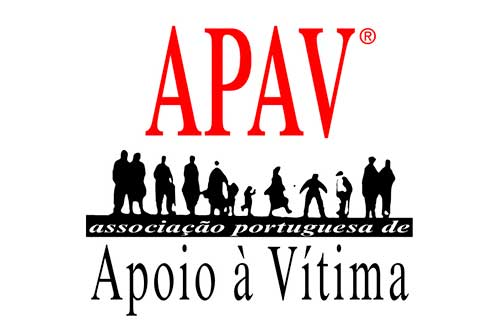
- Abbreviation: APAV
- Formation: June 25, 1990
- Type: Non-profit organization
- Legal status: Public utility legal entity
- Headquarters: Lisbon, Portugal
- Region served: Portugal
- Official language: Portuguese
- Website: www.apav.pt

The Portuguese Association for Victim Support (Portuguese: Associação Portuguesa de Apoio à Vítima, APAV) is a non-profit organisation founded in 1990 to support victims of crime and violence in Portugal.
