= Francisco Martins Rodrigues =

Portuguese politician (1927–2008)

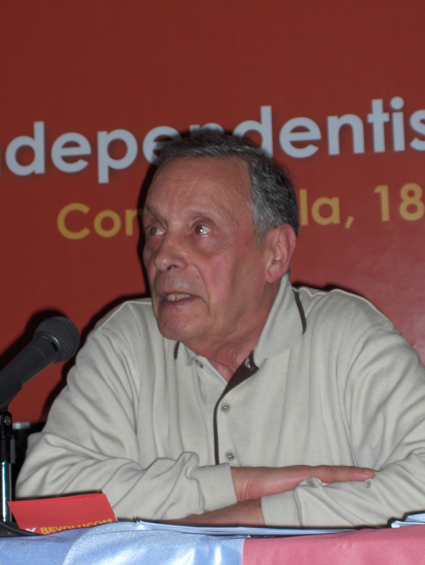
Francisco Martins Rodrigues in 2006.

Francisco Martins Rodrigues (1927, Moura - April 22, 2008) was a Portuguese anti-Fascist resistant and the founder of the Portuguese Marxist-Leninist Committee in 1964, which was one of the country's first major Marxist-Leninist organizations. Rodrigues was imprisoned numerous times by the PIDE, including a long prison term between 1965 and the Carnation Revolution in April 1974. On January 3, 1960, he, Álvaro Cunhal, and eight others escaped from Peniche Fortress to the great embarrassment of the government.

Francisco Martins Rodrigues died of cancer in Lisbon, Portugal, on April 22, 2008, at the age of 81. His funeral and cremation was held at the Cemitério do Alto São João.
