= Communist Party of Portugal (Marxist–Leninist) =

Defunct Portuguese communist party

Communist Party of Portugal Partido Comunista de Portugal (Marxista-Leninista)
- Founded: 1970
- Dissolved: 1980
- Preceded by: Portuguese Marxist-Leninist Committee
- Newspaper: People's Unity
- Ideology: Communism; Marxism-Leninism; Maoism; Anti-revisionism
- Political position: Far-left

The Communist Party of Portugal (Marxist–Leninist) (Portuguese: Partido Comunista de Portugal (Marxista-Leninista)) was an anti-revisionist Marxist-Leninist communist party in Portugal. Also known as the 'Mendes faction of PCP(M-L)'.

== History ==
PCP(M-L) was founded in 1970. It published Unidade Popular. In May 1974 Eduíno Vilar (real name Heduíno Gomes) was expelled. He set up his own PCP(m-l). Like the main PCP(M-L), Vilar's PCP(M-L) had a publication titled Unidade Popular. In 1974 a splinter group broke away from the party, forming the Popular Unity Party. At the time of the 1976 elections PCP(M-L) launched the slogan "For Independence, For Democracy, For Social Progress! - Vote for the lists presented by PCP(m-l)!" (Pela independência pela democracia, pelo progresso social! - vota nas listas apresentadas pelo PCP (m-l)!)

In May 1974 the general secretary of the Communist Party of Portugal (Marxist–Leninist) (in Portuguese: Partido Comunista de Portugal (Marxista-Leninista)) was expelled, forming his own similarly-named party. Like the other PCP(M-L), Vilar's PCP(M-L) had a publication titled Unidade Popular.

PCP(M-L) claimed that after the Carnation Revolution, the main threat to Portugal came from social fascism (represented through PCP leader Álvaro Cunhal) and Soviet social imperialism. The party supported the Socialist Party against PCP.

On November 17, 1974, Vilar's party launched the Worker-Peasant Alliance (AOC). The party took part in elections through AOC, since the name PCP(M-L) was taken by their adversaries.

Vilar's party had close relations to the Chinese Communist Party. It led the Democratic Portugal-China Friendship Association (ADAP-C).

At the VIII congress of the Party in March 1980 it was decided to dissolve the PCP(m-l).

== See also ==
- Democratic Portugal – China Friendship Association
- List of anti-revisionist groups
