= People's Socialist Front =

Defunct socialist party in Portugal 1974-2004

People's Socialist Front Frente Socialista Popular
- Founder: Manuel Serra
- Founded: 1974
- Dissolved: 7 July 2004
- Split from: Socialist Party
- Ideology: Socialism
- Political position: Left-wing

The People's Socialist Front or Popular Socialist Front (Portuguese: Frente Socialista Popular, FSP) was a socialist political party in Portugal, founded in 1974. It was a breakaway group from the Socialist Party.

== History ==
From December 14-16, 1974, shortly after the Carnation Revolution, the Socialist Party saw hardline militant Marxist elements attempt to stage a takeover of the party at their general congress but where defeated by the then Foreign Minister, Mário Soares who instead advocated for a more moderate line, as "the vast majority of the new candidates came into the party after [the Carnation Revolution]." The militants where led by Manuel Serra, a former member of the Popular Socialist Movement who spent years in jail during the Estado Novo. Serra had proposed an alternative list of more hard-line candidates, instead of those approved by the party, and forced a vote on which list would be submitted to the electoral commission at the party's general congress that would vote in favor of Soares' candidates. Shortly after Serra and his supporters would break from the Socialist party and form the Popular Socialist Front.

Under Serra's leadership, the FSP took place in violent demonstrations, including riots in Setúbal.

In the 1975 Constituent Assembly election, the FSP received less than 5% of the vote and won zero seats.

The FSP ran candidates in the 1976 legislative election, and participated in the 1976 local election in coalition with the Portuguese Communist Party and the Portuguese Democratic Movement inside the Electoral Front United People.

On 7 July 2004, after several years of inactivity, the party was declared extinct by the Portuguese Constitutional Court.
