= Portuguese Marxist–Leninist Communist Organization =

Portuguese Marxist-Leninist Communist Organization Organização Comunista Marxista-Leninista Portuguesa
- Founded: 1973
- Dissolved: 1975
- Preceded by: Portuguese Marxist-Leninist Committee
- Ideology: Communism; Marxism-Leninism; Maoism; Anti-revisionism
- Political position: Far-left

The Portuguese Marxist–Leninist Communist Organization (Portuguese: Organização Comunista Marxista-Leninista Portuguesa, OCMLP) was a Portuguese anti-revisionist Marxist–Leninist communist party, founded in 1972 after the merger between two minor communist grouping, the group around the journal O Comunista (split from the Portuguese Marxist-Leninist Committee) and O Grito do Povo (a group based in Northern Portugal). The party achieved some political expression in the last years of the fascist regime of Marcello Caetano, mainly in Paris, among a community of exiled politicians.

In December 1974 OCMLP launched the Communist Electoral Front (Marxist-Leninist) (FEC(m-l)), with which it participated in the 1975 Constituent Assembly elections.

The main publication of OCMLP was O Grito do Povo. The theoretical publication of OCMLP was Foice e Martello.

In December 1975, it merged with the Portuguese Marxist-Leninist Committee and the Organization for the Reconstruction of the Communist Party (Marxist-Leninist), forming the Portuguese Communist Party (Reconstructed) or PCP(R). Just prior to the merger, OCMLP had passed through a split. The majority, with strong base in Porto, went through with the merger plans. A minority, who kept strong emphasis on the issue of struggle against "social fascism", refused to join and continued a separate existence. (see: Communist Union for the Reconstruction of the Party (Marxist–Leninist)).

== See also ==
- List of anti-revisionist groups
