= Popular Unity Party (Portugal) =

Defunct Portuguese communist political party

- Founded: 1974
- Ideology: Communism; Marxism-Leninism

PUP poster

Popular Unity Party (Portuguese: Partido de Unidade Popular) was a political party in Portugal. PUP was founded in December 1974 by the Mendes fraction of the Communist Party of Portugal (Marxist-Leninist).

The PUP published a newspaper called Averdade (The Truth). It rejected parliamentary democracy and sought to create a people's republic of poor workers and peasants.

After the 1975 elections PUP was renamed Portuguese Marxist-Leninist Committee (Comité Marxista-Leninista Português).

In 1976 CMLP merged with the Portuguese Marxist-Leninist Communist Organization and the Organization for the Reconstruction of the Communist Party (Marxist-Leninist) to form the Portuguese Communist Party (Reconstructed).
