= Communist Party (Reconstructed) =

Communist Party (Reconstructed) Partido Comunista (reconstruído)
- Abbreviation: PC(R)
- Founded: 27 December 1975
- Legalised: 3 February 1981
- Dissolved: 5 July 1992
- Newspaper: Bandeira Vermelha; Comunismo
- Youth wing: Revolutionary Young Communist League
- Ideology: Communism; Marxism-Leninism; Anti-revisionism; Hoxhaism

Communist Party (Reconstructed) (Portuguese: Partido Comunista Português (reconstruído)), initially known as Portuguese Communist Party (Reconstructed) (Portuguese: Partido Comunista Português (Reconstruído)), was a political party in Portugal.

== History ==
Proclamation of CMLP, OCMLP and ORPC(ml). announcing the constitutive congress of PCP(R).

PCP(R) was founded at a unitary congress in December 1975, through the fusion of the Portuguese Marxist-Leninist Communist Organization, the Portuguese Marxist-Leninist Committee and the Organization for the Reconstruction of the Communist Party (Marxist-Leninist).

PCP(R) held its second congress in 1977.

After the break between China and Albania, PCP(R) sided with the Albanian Party of Labour. The Communist Party of Brazil had a strong influence over PCP(R).

PC(R) published Bandeira Vermelha.

The youth league of PCP(R)/PC(R) was the Revolutionary Young Communist League (UJCR).

In 1992 PC(R) was renamed Communists for Democracy and Progress (Comunistas pela Democracia e Progresso). In 1995 CDP merged into the People's Democratic Union.

== Election results ==
Year	Election	Votes	%	Representatives
1985	Legislative	12,749	0.22%	-
1987	Legislative	18,544	0.33%	-
1987	European	24,060	0.43%	-

== See also ==
- List of anti-revisionist groups
