= Party lists for the 2022 Portuguese legislative election =

Members of Parliament in the 2022 Portuguese legislative election were elected in a closed list proportional representation system. Each constituency in Portugal elects a certain number of MPs depending on their number of registered voters. This number ranges from a minimum of 2 MPs in Portalegre to 48 in Lisbon. In this page, the names of the head candidates by party and/or coalition for each constituency will be listed. The leader of each party/coalition is displayed in bold.

== Heads of party lists ==
=== Parties represented in Parliament ===
Constituency	PS	PSD	BE	CDU	CDS–PP	PAN	CH	IL	L
Aveiro	Pedro Nuno Santos	António Topa Gomes	Moisés Ferreira	Adelino Nunes	Martim Borges de Freitas	Rui Alvarenga	Jorge Valsassina Galveias	Cristiano Santos	Joana Filipe
Beja	Pedro do Carmo	Henrique Silvestre	José Esteves	João Dias	Francisco Palma	Luís Vicente	Ana Moisão	Ana Paula Pereira	João Aiveca Caseiro
Braga	José Luís Carneiro	André Coelho Lima	José Maria Cardoso	Torcato Ribeiro	Paulo Areia de Carvalho	Rafael Pinto	Filipe Melo	Rui Rocha	Teresa Mota
Bragança	João Sobrinho Teixeira	Adão Silva	André Ferreira	Joana Monteiro	António Lemos Mendonça	Octávio Pires	José Vaz Pires	Teresa Aguiar	Maxim Jaffe
Castelo Branco	Ana Abrunhosa	Cláudia André	Cristina Guedes	Jorge Fael	Maria Inês Moreira	Amália Cardoso	João Ribeiro	Diogo Oliveira	Stela Lourenço
Coimbra	Marta Temido	Mónica Quintela	José Manuel Pureza	Manuel Pires da Rocha	Jorge Alexandre Almeida	João Pedro Costa	Paulo Ralha	Orlando Monteiro da Silva	Rui Mamede
Évora	Luís Capoulas Santos	Sónia Ramos	Bruno Martins	João Oliveira	Ana Costa Freitas	Alexandra Moreira	Edalberto Figueiredo	Maria Cabral	Glória Franco
Faro	Jamila Madeira	Luís Gomes	José Gusmão	Catarina Marques	José Pedro Caçorinho	Ana Poeta	Pedro Pinto	Cláudia Vasconcelos	Marta Setúbal
Guarda	Ana Mendes Godinho	Gustavo Duarte	Pedro Cardoso	André Santos	João Mário Amaral	Beatriz Salafranca	José Marques	Ângelo Santos	Margarida Bordalo
Leiria	António Lacerda Sales	Paulo Mota Pinto	Ricardo Vicente	**Heloísa Apolónia**	António Galvão Lucas	Liliana Vieira	Gabriel Mithá Ribeiro	Dário Florindo	Filipe Honório
Lisbon	**António Costa**	Ricardo Baptista Leite	Mariana Mortágua	**Jerónimo de Sousa**	**Francisco Rodrigues dos Santos**	**Inês Sousa Real**	**André Ventura**	**João Cotrim de Figueiredo**	Rui Tavares
Portalegre	Ricardo Pinheiro	João Pedro Luís	Cecília Carrilho	Helena Neves	Bruno Batista	Jorge Alcobia	Júlio Paixão	Carlos Roquette	Francisco Biscainho
Porto	Alexandre Quintanilha	Sofia Matos (Note: Rui Rio, the leader of PSD, was the second candidate of the list.)	**Catarina Martins**	Diana Ferreira	Filipa Correia Pinto	Bebiana Cunha	Rui Afonso	Carlos Guimarães Pinto	Jorge Pinto
Santarém	Alexandra Leitão	Isaura Morais	Fabíola Cardoso	António Filipe	Pedro Melo	Mónica Silva	Pedro Frazão	Ana Cristina Rodrigues	Sandro Santos
Setúbal	Ana Catarina Mendes	Nuno Carvalho	Joana Mortágua	Paula Santos	Cecília Anacoreta Correia	Vítor Pinto	Bruno Nunes	Joana Cordeiro	Paulo Muacho
Viana do Castelo	Tiago Brandão Rodrigues	Jorge Salgueiro Mendes	Luís Louro	Joaquim Celestino Ribeiro	Joana Mendes	Miguel Queirós	Manuel Rego Moreira	Ivone Marques	Filipe Faro da Costa
Vila Real	Francisco Rocha	Artur Soveral Andrade	Enara Teixeira	José Miguel Fernandes	Vítor Pimentel	José Castro	Manuela Tender	Joana Ferreira	João Luís Silva
Viseu	João Azevedo	Hugo Martins de Carvalho	Manuela Antunes	Alexandre Hoffmann Castela	Manuel Marques	Carolina Almeida	João Tilly	Sérgio Figueiredo	Miguel Won
Azores	Francisco César	Paulo Moniz	Jéssica Pacheco	Judite Barros	—N/a	Ana Teixeira	José Pacheco	Pedro Ferreira	José Azevedo
Madeira	Carlos João Pereira	Sérgio Marques	Luísa Santos	Herlanda Amado	—N/a	Joaquim Batalha de Sousa	Martinho Gouveia	Duarte Gouveia	Tiago Camacho
Europe	Paulo Pisco	Maria Ester Vargas	Teresa Soares	Joana Abreu Carvalho	Francisca Sampaio	Rogério Castro	José Dias Fernandes	Carolina Diniz	Natércia Lopes
Outside Europe	Augusto Santos Silva	António Maló de Abreu	Miguel Heleno	Dulce Kurtenbach	Hussein Keshavjee	Nelson Abreu	João Baptista da Silva	Nuno Garoupa	Geizy Fernandes
Sources									

=== Parties not represented in Parliament ===
Constituency	A	PCTP/MRPP	RIR	E	MPT	NC	ADN	JPP	PPM	PTP	MAS	VP
Aveiro	—N/a	João Pinto	Alcino Ferreira	Anselmo Oliveira	Isabel Barros	—N/a	Bárbara dos Santos	Bruno Pestana	—N/a	—N/a	Daniel Martins	André Ferreira
Beja	—N/a	Carlos Pais	Mário Balsemão	Francisco Faria	Arlindo Oliveira	—N/a	—N/a	—N/a	—N/a	Susana Abreu	João Carlos Pascoal	Íris de Lá Féria
Braga	Carlos Vaz	—N/a	Fernando Lemos	Carlos Lobo	João Pedro Oliveira	—N/a	—N/a	João Manuel Horta	—N/a	Manuel Obreia	Vasco Santos	Miguel Rosa
Bragança	—N/a	—N/a	Bruno Carvalho	Luís Gomes Luís	Ana Lúcia Justino	—N/a	—N/a	—N/a	—N/a	—N/a	Ângela Lima	—N/a
Castelo Branco	—N/a	José Marrucho	Jorge Azevedo	Jorge Torres	Álvaro Lopes	Isaura Costa	~~Dora Lontro~~	—N/a	—N/a	Fernando Joaquim	Anabela Sobrinho	—N/a
Coimbra	João Afonso	João da Ponte	Carla Camões	Pedro Miguel Marques	Ana Sofia Santos	—N/a	—N/a	—N/a	—N/a	—N/a	Inês Van Velze	Carlos Alberto da Silva
Évora	—N/a	—N/a	Luís Eustáquio	Carlos Pagará	João Paulo Borreicho	—N/a	—N/a	—N/a	—N/a	Carlos Moreira	Maria Manuela Almeida	António de Souza
Faro	—N/a	—N/a	Rui Curado	Fábio Fatal	Manuel Mestre	—N/a	Jorge Rodrigues de Jesus	—N/a	—N/a	Henrique Seixas	João Antunes	Bruno Ribeiro
Guarda	—N/a	—N/a	Ana Isabel Ramos	Otília Fernandes	Mário Gomes	—N/a	—N/a	—N/a	—N/a	António Andrade	Sílvio Miguel	Jorge dos Santos
Leiria	—N/a	—N/a	Maria Baptista	Paulo Alves	Manuel Carreira	José Mendes	Florindo Figueiredo	—N/a	—N/a	Dulce Rodrigues	Deolinda Roda	Isac Valente
Lisbon	**Jorge Nuno de Sá**	**Cidália Guerreiro**	Márcia Henriques	**José Pinto Coelho**	Francisco Santos	**Joaquim Rocha Afonso**	**Bruno Fialho**	Leonardo Reis	—N/a	Gonçalo Madaleno	**Renata Cambra**	**Tiago Matos Gomes**
Portalegre	—N/a	António Corricas	Américo Muacho	Carla Ribeiro	Pedro Lancha	—N/a	—N/a	—N/a	—N/a	Marco Brissos	Cláudia Santos	Simão Reis
Porto	João Bola	—N/a	**Vitorino Silva**	Bruno Rebelo	Nuno Pereira	José Ferreira	Miguel de Carvalho	Ana Raquel Teixeira	—N/a	Alexandra Rato	Pedro Queirós e Castro	João de Andrade
Santarém	—N/a	—N/a	Pedro Miguel Silva	João Pais do Amaral	Hélder Cardeira	—N/a	—N/a	—N/a	—N/a	Américo Sousa	Gil Garcia	Mykhaylo-Roman Shemliy
Setúbal	—N/a	Carlos Gomes	Carina Deus	João Patrocínio	Miguel Rodrigues	David Rocha	Joaquim Torres	Daniel Faria	—N/a	Horácio Fonseca	João Faria Ferreira	José de Freitas
Viana do Castelo	Alberto Ribeiro	—N/a	Diana Barros	Diogo Casanova	Hélder Pena	—N/a	—N/a	—N/a	—N/a	—N/a	Maria Faria Ferreira	Camilo Vaz
Vila Real	—N/a	—N/a	Sandra Pinto	Isabel Montalvão e Silva	Nuno Ligeiro Novo	João Cabeço	—N/a	—N/a	—N/a	—N/a	Bruno Cancelinha	João Pedro Gonçalves
Viseu	—N/a	—N/a	Paula Teixeira	Vítor Ramalho	Norberto Albuquerque	Ana Rita Barreto	Gonçalo Pereira	—N/a	—N/a	Paulo Rodrigues	Maria de Fátima Cosme	Tânia Filipe e Campos
Azores	—N/a	António Vital	Eva Rosa	Roque Almeida	**Pedro Soares Pimenta**	—N/a	Pedro Martins	—N/a	—N/a	—N/a	Eduardo Jorge Pereira	Dino Castelo Branco
Madeira	—N/a	—N/a	Liana Reis	Ana Braz Gonçalves	Valter Rodrigues	—N/a	Filipe Rebelo	**Élvio Sousa**	Paulo Brito	José Manuel Coelho	António Grosso	—N/a
Europe	Ossanda Liber	Vítor Hugo Pereira	Paulo José de Sousa	Paulo Martins	José Inácio Faria	Paulo Viana	Amílcar Martins	—N/a	—N/a	Idalina Madaleno	José Sebastião	Duarte Costa
Outside Europe	Luiz Guerreiro Lopes	—N/a	Bárbara Teixeira	Jorge Almeida	Othon Dubeux Nin	Renato Epifânio	Fernando Barreto	—N/a	—N/a	—N/a	Maricel Borghelli	Leandro Damasceno
Sources												

== Elected candidates ==
=== Aveiro ===
==== Socialist Party ====
- Pedro Nuno Santos
- Cláudia Cruz Santos
- Carlos Neto Brandão
- Porfírio Silva
- Susana Correia
- Hugo Oliveira
- Joana Sá Pereira
- Bruno Aragão

==== Social Democratic Party ====
- António Topa Gomes
- Paula Cardoso
- Ricardo Sousa
- Helga Correia
- Rui Cruz
- Carla Madureira

==== Chega ====
- Jorge Valsassina Galveias

=== Beja ===
==== Socialist Party ====
- Pedro do Carmo
- Nelson Brito

==== Unitary Democratic Coalition ====
- João Dias

=== Braga ===
==== Socialist Party ====
- José Luís Carneiro
- Elisabete Matos
- Joaquim Barreto
- Hugo Pires
- Palmira Maciel
- Luís Carvalho Soares
- Eduardo Oliveira
- Anabela Real
- Pompeu Martins

==== Social Democratic Party ====
- André Coelho Lima
- Firmino Marques
- Clara Marques Mendes
- Carlos Eduardo Reis
- Jorge Paulo Oliveira
- Maria Gabriela Fonseca
- Bruno Coimbra
- Carlos Cação

==== Chega ====
- Filipe Melo

==== Liberal Initiative ====
- Rui Rocha

=== Bragança ===
==== Socialist Party ====
- João Sobrinho Simões
- Berta Nunes

==== Social Democratic Party ====
- Adão Silva

=== Castelo Branco ===
==== Socialist Party ====
- Ana Abrunhosa
- João Paulo Catarino
- Nuno Fazenda

==== Social Democratic Party ====
- Cláudia André

=== Coimbra ===
==== Socialist Party ====
- Marta Temido
- Pedro Coimbra
- Tiago Estêvão Martins
- Raquel Ferreira
- José Carlos Alexandrino
- Ricardo Lino

==== Social Democratic Party ====
- Mónica Quintela
- Fátima Ramos
- João Paulo Barbosa de Melo

=== Évora ===
==== Socialist Party ====
- Luís Capoulas Santos
- Norberto Patinho

==== Social Democratic Party ====
- Sónia Ramos

=== Faro ===
==== Socialist Party ====
- Jamila Madeira
- Jorge Botelho
- Luís Graça
- Isabel Guerreiro
- Francisco Pereira de Oliveira

==== Social Democratic Party ====
- Luís Gomes
- Rui Cristina
- Ofélia Ramos

==== Chega ====
- Pedro Pinto

=== Guarda ===
==== Socialist Party ====
- Ana Mendes Godinho
- António Monteirinho

==== Social Democratic Party ====
- Gustavo Duarte

=== Leiria ===
==== Socialist Party ====
- António Lacerda Sales
- Eurico Brilhante Dias
- Catarina Sarmento e Castro
- Sara Velez
- Salvador Formiga

==== Social Democratic Party ====
- Paulo Mota Pinto
- Hugo Patrício de Oliveira
- Olga Silvestre
- João Marques

==== Chega ====
- Gabriel Mithá Ribeiro

=== Lisbon ===
==== Socialist Party ====
- António Costa
- Edite Estrela
- Mariana Vieira da Silva
- Duarte Cordeiro
- Fernando Medina
- Graça Fonseca
- Miguel Costa Matos
- Sérgio Monte
- Maria da Luz Rosinha
- Marcos Perestrello
- João Galamba
- Susana Amador
- Sérgio Sousa Pinto
- Ana Sofia Antunes
- Pedro Delgado Alves
- Maria de Fátima Fonseca
- Isabel Moreira
- Pedro Cegonho
- Romualda Fernandes
- Miguel Cabrita
- Rita Madeira

==== Social Democratic Party ====
- Ricardo Baptista Leite
- José Silvano
- Isabel Meirelles
- Joaquim Miranda Sarmento
- Duarte Pacheco
- Lina Lopes
- Tiago Moreira de Sá
- Pedro Roque
- Joana Barata Lopes
- Alexandre Poço
- António Proa
- Maria Emília Apolinário
- Alexandre Simões

==== Liberal Initiative ====
- João Cotrim de Figueiredo
- Carla Castro
- Rodrigo Saraiva
- Bernardo Blanco

==== Chega ====
- André Ventura
- Rui Paulo Sousa
- Rita Matias
- Pedro Pessanha

==== Unitary Democratic Coalition ====
- Jerónimo de Sousa
- Alma Rivera

==== Left Bloc ====
- Mariana Mortágua
- Pedro Filipe Soares

==== LIVRE ====
- Rui Tavares

==== People Animals Nature ====
- Inês Sousa Real

=== Portalegre ===
==== Socialist Party ====
- Ricardo Pinheiro
- Eduardo Alves

=== Porto ===
==== Socialist Party ====
- Alexandre Quintanilha
- Rosário Gambôa
- João Pedro Matos Fernandes
- Isabel Oneto
- João Paulo Correia
- Ana Paula Bernardo
- João Torres
- Tiago Barbosa Ribeiro
- Cristina Mendes da Silva
- Eduardo Pinheiro
- Hugo Carvalho
- Joana Ferreira Lima
- Rui Lage
- Carlos Brás
- Patrícia Ribeiro Faro
- Carla Sousa
- Miguel dos Santos Rodrigues
- Sofia Andrade
- José Carlos Barbosa

==== Social Democratic Party ====
- Sofia Matos
- Rui Rio
- Paulo Oliveira
- Catarina Rocha Ferreira
- Afonso Oliveira
- Hugo Carneiro
- Márcia Passos
- Paulo Ramalho
- Pedro Melo Lopes
- Germana Rocha
- Miguel Santos
- Joaquim Pinto Moreira
- Andreia Neto
- Firmino Pereira

==== Liberal Initiative ====
- Carlos Guimarães Pinto
- Patrícia Gilvaz

==== Left Bloc ====
- Catarina Martins
- José Soeiro

==== Chega ====
- Rui Afonso
- Diogo Pacheco de Amorim

==== Unitary Democratic Coalition ====
- Diana Ferreira

=== Santarém ===
==== Socialist Party ====
- Alexandra Leitão
- Hugo Costa
- Maria do Céu Antunes
- Mara Lagriminha
- Manuel dos Santos Afonso

==== Social Democratic Party ====
- Isaura Morais
- João Moura
- Inês Barroso

==== Chega ====
- Pedro Frazão

=== Setúbal ===
==== Socialist Party ====
- Ana Catarina Mendes
- João Gomes Cravinho
- Eurídice Pereira
- Jorge Seguro Sanches
- António Mendonça Mendes
- Maria Antónia Almeida Santos
- André Pinotes Batista
- Clarisse Campos
- Fernando José
- Ivan Gonçalves

==== Social Democratic Party ====
- Nuno Carvalho
- Fernando Negrão
- Fernanda Velez

==== Unitary Democratic Coalition ====
- Paula Santos
- Bruno Dias

==== Chega ====
- Bruno Nunes

==== Left Bloc ====
- Joana Mortágua

==== Liberal Initiative ====
- Joana Cordeiro

=== Viana do Castelo ===
==== Socialist Party ====
- Tiago Brandão Rodrigues
- Marina Gonçalves
- José Maria Costa

==== Social Democratic Party ====
- Jorge Salgueiro Mendes
- Emília Cerqueira
- João Montenegro

=== Vila Real ===
==== Socialist Party ====
- Francisco Rocha
- Fátima Correia Pinto
- Agostinho Santa

==== Social Democratic Party ====
- Artur Soveral Andrade
- Cláudia Bento

=== Viseu ===
==== Socialist Party ====
- João Azevedo
- Lúcia Araújo Silva
- José Rui Cruz
- João Paulo Rebelo

=== Azores ===
==== Socialist Party ====
- Francisco César
- Sérgio Ávila
- Isabel Rodrigues

==== Democratic Alliance ====
- Paulo Moniz (PSD)
- Francisco Pimentel (PSD)

=== Madeira ===
==== Madeira First ====
- Sérgio Marques (PSD)
- Sara Madruga da Costa (PSD)
- Patrícia Dantas (PSD)

==== Socialist Party ====
- Carlos João Pereira
- José Miguel Iglésias
- Marta Freitas

=== Europe ===
==== Socialist Party ====
- Paulo Pisco
- Nathalie de Oliveira

=== Outside Europe ===
==== Social Democratic Party ====
- António Maló de Abreu

==== Socialist Party ====
- Augusto Santos Silva

== See also ==
- List of political parties in Portugal
- Party lists for the 2019 Portuguese legislative election
- Party lists for the 2024 Portuguese legislative election
- Party lists for the 2025 Portuguese legislative election
