= List of deputies of Portugal (XV legislature) =

Portuguese parliamentarians, 2022–

Those are the deputies that sit in the 15th Legislature of the Third Portuguese Republic. They were elected in the 2022 Portuguese legislative election, according to the Ministério da Administração Interna.

== Aveiro District ==
=== Chega ===
- Jorge Valsassina Galveias

=== PPD/PSD ===
- António Milton Topa Gomes
- Maria Paula da Graça Cardoso
- Ricardo Bastos Sousa
- Helga Correia
- Rui Miguel Rocha da Cruz
- Carla Madureira
- Rui Filipe Vilar Gomes

=== PS ===
- Pedro Nuno Santos
- Cláudia Maria Cruz Santos
- Carlos Filipe de Andrade Neto Brandão
- Porfirio Simões de Carvalho e Silva
- Susana Alexandra Lopes Correia
- Hugo Daniel Matos Oliveira
- Joana Isabel Martins Rigueiro de Sá Pereira
- Bruno Armando Aragão Henriques

== Beja District ==
=== PCP-PEV ===
- João Manuel Ildefonso Dias

=== PS ===
- Pedro Nuno Raposo Prazeres do Carmo
- Nelson Domingos Brito

== Braga District ==
=== Chega ===
- Filipe Melo

=== Liberal Initiative ===
- Rui Rocha

=== PPD/PSD ===
- André Guimarães Coelho Lima
- Firmino José Rodrigues Marques
- Clara Marques Mendes
- Carlos Eduardo Vasconcelos Fernandes Ribeiro dos Reis
- Jorge Paulo da Silva Oliveira
- Maria Gabriela Fonseca
- Bruno Manuel Pereira Coimbra
- Carlos Manuel de Brito Cação

=== PS ===
- José Luís Pereira Carneiro
- Elisabete Matos
- Joaquim Barroso de Almeida Barreto
- Hugo Alexandre Polido Pires
- Palmira Maciel Fernandes da Costa
- Luís Miguel de Freitas Marques Carvalho Soares
- Eduardo Salvador da Costa Oliveira
- Anabela Pimenta de Lima de Deus Real
- Pompeu Miguel Noval da Rocha Martins

== Bragança District ==
=== PPD/PSD ===
- Adão José Fonseca Silva

=== PS ===
- João Alberto Sobrinho Teixeira
- Berta Nunes

== Castelo Branco District ==
=== PPD/PSD ===
- Cláudia André

=== PS ===
- Ana Abrunhosa
- João Paulo Marçal Lopes Catarino
- Nuno Jorge Cardona Fazenda de Almeida

== Coimbra District ==
=== PPD/PSD ===
- Mónica Quintela
- Maria de Fátima Simões Ramos do Vale Ferreira
- João Paulo Lima Barbosa de Melo

=== PS ===
- Marta Temido
- Pedro Artur Barreirinhas Sales Guedes Coimbra
- Tiago Estevão Martins
- Raquel Ferreira
- José Carlos Alexandrino Mendes
- Ricardo Manuel Garrido Lino

== Évora District ==
=== PPD/PSD ===
- Sónia Cristina Silva dos Ramos

=== PS ===
- Luís Capoulas Santos
- Norberto António Lopes Patinho

== Faro District ==
=== Chega ===
- Pedro Pinto

=== PPD/PSD ===
- Luís Filipe Soromenho Gomes
- Rui Celestino dos Santos Cristina
- Ofélia Ramos

=== PS ===
- Jamila Madeira
- Jorge Manuel Nascimento Botelho
- Luís Miguel da Graça Nunes
- Isabel Cristina Andrez Guerreiro Bica
- Francisco José Pereira Oliveira

== Guarda District ==
=== PPD/PSD ===
- Gustavo de Sousa Duarte

=== PS ===
- Ana Mendes Godinho
- António Herminio Carvalho Monteirinho

== Leiria District ==
=== Chega ===
- Gabriel Mithá Ribeiro

=== PPD/PSD ===
- Paulo Cardoso Correia da Mota Pinto
- Hugo Patrício Martinho de Oliveira
- Olga Silvestre
- João Manuel Gomes Marques

=== PS ===
- António Lacerda Sales
- Eurico Brilhante Dias
- Catarina Sarmento e Castro
- Sara Maria Belo Velez
- Salvador Portugal Formiga

== Lisbon District ==
=== Bloco de Esquerda ===
- Mariana Mortágua
- Pedro Filipe Soares

=== Chega ===
- André Ventura
- Rui Paulo Sousa
- Rita Matias
- Pedro Pessanha

=== Iniciativa Liberal ===
- João Cotrim de Figueiredo
- Carla Maria Proença de Castro Charters de Azevedo
- Rodrigo Miguel Dias Saraiva
- Bernardo Alves Martinho Amaral Blanco

=== LIVRE ===
- Rui Tavares

=== PAN ===
- Inês Sousa Real

=== PCP-PEV ===
- Jerónimo de Sousa
- Alma Rivera

=== PPD/PSD ===
- Ricardo Baptista Leite
- José Maria Lopes Silvano
- Isabel Meirelles
- Joaquim José Miranda Sarmento
- Duarte Rogério Matos Ventura Pacheco
- Lina Lopes
- Tiago Moreira de Sá
- António Pedro Roque da Visitação Oliveira
- Joana Catarina Barata Reis Lopes
- Alexandre Damasceno da Silva Poço
- António Manuel Pimenta Proa
- Maria Emília Apolinário Sota Felicíssimo
- Alexandre Bernardo de Macedo e Lopes Simões

=== PS ===
- António Costa
- Edite Estrela
- Mariana Vieira da Silva
- José Duarte Piteira Rica Silvestre Cordeiro
- Fernando Medina
- Graça Fonseca
- Miguel de Oliveira Pires da Costa de Matos
- Sérgio Alexandrino Monteiro do Monte
- Maria da Luz Rosinha
- Marcos da Cunha e Lorena Perestrello de Vasconcelos
- João Saldanha de Azevedo Galamba
- Susana Amador
- Sérgio Sousa Pinto
- Ana Sofia Antunes
- Pedro Filipe Mota Delgado Simões Alves
- Maria de Fátima de Jesus Fonseca
- Isabel Moreira
- Pedro Miguel de Sousa Barrocas Martinho Cegonho
- Romualda Fernandes
- Miguel Cabrita
- Rita Mafalda Nobre Borges Madeira

== Portalegre District ==
=== PS ===
- Ricardo Miguel Furtado Pinheiro
- Eduardo Miguel Oliveira Alves

== Porto District ==
=== Bloco de Esquerda ===
- Catarina Martins
- José Soeiro

=== Chega ===
- Rui Afonso
- Diogo Pacheco de Amorim

=== Iniciativa Liberal ===
- Carlos Guimarães Pinto
- Ana Patrícia Costa Gilvaz

=== PCP-PEV ===
- Diana Ferreira

=== PPD/PSD ===
- Sofia Matos
- Rui Rio
- Paulo César Rios de Oliveira
- Catarina Leite de Faria da Rocha Ferreira
- Afonso Gonçalves da Silva Oliveira
- Hugo Miguel Sousa Carneiro
- Márcia Passos
- Paulo Fernando de Sousa Ramalho
- Rui Pedro Guimarães de Melo Carvalho Lopes
- Maria Germana de Sousa Rocha
- Paulo Miguel da Silva Santos
- Joaquim José Pinto Moreira
- Andreia Carina Machado da Silva Neto
- Firmino Jorge Anjos Pereira

=== PS ===
- Alexandre Quintanilha
- Maria do Rosário Gamboa Lopes de Carvalho
- João Pedro Matos Fernandes
- Maria Isabel Solnado Porto Oneto
- João Paulo Moreira Correia
- Ana Bernardo
- João Torres
- Tiago Barbosa Ribeiro
- Cristina Maria Mendes da Silva
- Eduardo Nuno Rodrigues e Pinheiro
- Hugo Miguel da Costa Carvalho
- Joana Ferreira Lima
- Rui Carlos Morais Lage
- Carlos Alberto Silva Brás
- Patrícia Monte Pinto Ribeiro Faro
- Carla Alexandra Magalhães de Sousa
- Miguel dos Santos Rodrigues
- Isabel Sofia Alves de Andrade
- José Carlos Ribeiro Barbosa

== Santarém District ==
=== Chega ===
- Pedro Frazão

=== PPD/PSD ===
- Isaura Morais
- João Manuel Moura Rodrigues
- Maria Inês Leiria Barroso

=== PS ===
- Alexandra Leitão
- Hugo Miguel Carvalheiro dos Santos Costa
- Maria do Céu Antunes
- Mara Lúcia Lagriminha Coelho
- Manuel António dos Santos Afonso

== Setúbal District ==
=== Bloco de Esquerda ===
- Joana Mortágua

=== Chega ===
- Bruno Nunes

=== Iniciativa Liberal ===
- Joana Rita Madaleno Cordeiro

=== PCP-PEV ===
- Paula Santos
- Bruno Ramos Dias

=== PPD/PSD ===
- Nuno Miguel Oliveira Carvalho
- Fernando Negrão
- Maria Fernanda Pardaleiro Velez

=== PS ===
- Ana Catarina Mendes
- João Gomes Cravinho
- Eurídice Maria de Sousa Pereira
- Jorge Filipe Teixeira Seguro Sanches
- António Manuel Veiga dos Santos Mendonça Mendes
- Maria Antónia Almeida Santos
- André Alexandre Pinotes Batista
- Clarisse Campos
- Fernando Miguel Catarino José
- Ivan Costa Gonçalves

== Viana do Castelo District ==
=== PPD/PSD ===
- Jorge Manuel Salgueiro Mendes
- Emília Cerqueira
- João Carlos Araújo Rêgo Montenegro

=== PS ===
- Tiago Brandão Rodrigues
- Marina Sola Gonçalves
- José Maria da Cunha Costa

== Vila Real District ==
=== PPD/PSD ===
- Artur José Montenegro Soveral Freire de Andrade
- Cláudia Bento

=== PS ===
- Francisco José Ferreira da Rocha
- Fátima Correia Pinto
- Agostinho Gonçalves Alves da Santa

== Viseu District ==
=== PPD/PSD ===
- Hugo Daniel Alves Martins de Carvalho
- António Guilherme de Jesus Pais de Almeida
- Cristiana Maria da Silva Ferreira
- Hugo João Ribeiro Maravilha

=== PS ===
- João Azevedo
- Lúcia Fernanda Ferreira Araújo da Silva
- José Rui Alves Duarte da Cruz
- João Paulo de Loureiro Rebelo

== Madeira ==
=== PPD/PSD ===
- Sérgio Marques
- Sara Martins Marques Santos Madruga da Costa
- Patrícia Dantas

=== PS ===
- Carlos João Pereira
- José Miguel Mafra lglésias
- Marta Freitas (politician)

== Azores ==
=== PPD/PSD ===
- Paulo Alexandre Luís Botelho Moniz
- Francisco José Duarte Pimentel

=== PS ===
- Francisco Miguel Vital Gomes do Vale César
- Sérgio Humberto Rocha de Ávila
- Isabel Maria Duarte de Almeida Rodrigues

== Europe ==
=== PS ===
- Paulo Alexandre Carvalho Pisco
- Natália Teixeira de Oliveira

== Outside of Europe ==
=== PPD/PSD ===
- António Alberto Maló de Abreu

=== PS ===
- Augusto Ernesto Santos Silva
