= Party lists for the 2019 Portuguese legislative election =

Members of Parliament in the 2019 Portuguese legislative election were elected in a closed list proportional representation system. Each constituency in Portugal elects a certain number of MPs depending on their number of registered voters. This number ranges from a minimum of 2 MPs in Portalegre to 48 in Lisbon. In this page, the names of the head candidates by party and/or coalition for each constituency will be listed. The leader of each party/coalition is displayed in bold.

== Heads of party lists ==
=== Parties represented in Parliament ===
Constituency	PSD	PS	BE	CDS–PP	CDU	PAN
Aveiro	Ana Miguel dos Santos	Pedro Nuno Santos	Moisés Ferreira	João Almeida	Miguel Viegas	Filipe Cayolla
Beja	Henrique Silvestre	Pedro do Carmo	Mariana Aiveca	Inês Lopes Teixeira	João Dias	Inês Campos
Braga	André Coelho Lima	Sónia Fertuzinhos	José Maria Cardoso	Telmo Correia	Carla Cruz	Rafael Pinto
Bragança	Adão Silva	Jorge Nogueiro Gomes	Pedro Oliveira	Nuno Moreira	Fátima Bento	Paul Summers
Castelo Branco	Cláudia André	Hortense Martins	Rui Lino	Assunção Patto	Ana Leitão	Rebeca Lopes
Coimbra	Mónica Quintela	Marta Temido	José Manuel Pureza	Rui Lopes da Silva	Manuel Pires da Rocha	Sandra Teixeira do Carmo
Évora	Sónia Ramos	Luís Capoulas Santos	Bruno Martins	Paulo Carvalho	João Oliveira	Luís Teixeira
Faro	Cristóvão Norte	Jamila Madeira	João Vasconcelos	João Rebelo	Tiago Raposo	Paulo Baptista
Guarda	Carlos Peixoto	Ana Mendes Godinho	Jorge Mendes	Henrique Monteiro	André Santos	Tânia Duarte
Leiria	Margarida Balseiro Lopes	Raul Miguel de Castro	Ricardo Vicente	Raquel Abecasis	**Heloísa Apolónia**	Rui Prudêncio
Lisbon	Filipa Roseta	**António Costa**	Mariana Mortágua	**Assunção Cristas**	**Jerónimo de Sousa**	**André Silva**
Portalegre	António Miranda	Luís Moreira Testa	António Ricardo	José Rato Nunes	Manuela Cunha	Jorge Alcobia
Porto	Hugo Martins de Carvalho (Note: Rui Rio, the leader of PSD, was the second candidate of the list.)	Alexandre Quintanilha	**Catarina Martins**	Cecília Meireles	Diana Ferreira	Bebiana Cunha
Santarém	Isaura Morais	Alexandra Leitão	Fabíola Cardoso	Patrícia Fonseca	António Filipe	Pedro Machado
Setúbal	Nuno Carvalho	Ana Catarina Mendes	Joana Mortágua	Nuno Magalhães	Francisco Lopes	Cristina Rodrigues
Viana do Castelo	Jorge Salgueiro Mendes	Tiago Brandão Rodrigues	Luís Louro	Filipe Anacoreta Correia	Artur Machado	Ricardo Arieira
Vila Real	Luís Leite Ramos	Ascenso Simões	Mariana Falcato Simões	Patrique Alves	Manuel Cunha	José Maria Castro
Viseu	Fernando Ruas	João Azevedo	Bárbara Xavier	Hélder Amaral	Miguel Tiago	Carolina Almeida
Azores	Paulo Moniz	Isabel Rodrigues	António Lima	Rui Oliveira Martins	António José Almeida	Pedro Neves
Madeira	Miguel Albuquerque	Carlos João Pereira	Ernesto Ferraz	Sara Madalena	Herlanda Amado	Ana Mendonça
Europe	Carlos Alberto Gonçalves	Paulo Pisco	Tiago Pinheiro	Melissa Fernandes	Rita Rato	Gonçalo Gomes
Outside Europe	José Cesário	Augusto Santos Silva	João Branco	Gonçalo Perestrelo dos Santos	Dulce Kurtenbach	Catarina Ressurreição
Sources						

=== Parties not represented in Parliament ===
Constituency	PDR	PCTP/MRPP	L	PNR	MPT	PTP	MAS	NC	PPM	JPP	PURP	IL	A	CH	RIR
Aveiro	Inês Talufa	João Valente Pinto	Bernardo Vidal	Anselmo Oliveira	Raul Rodrigues	Alexandra Rato	—N/a	Humberto Silva	Luís Brandão de Almeida	Jaime Pinho	João Dias	Cristiano Santos	Fernando Pereira dos Santos	Karina Marques	Maria Isabel Gautier
Beja	Aurélio Saiote	Joaquim Covas	Nelson Caetano	Francisco Faria	Catarina Alves Martins	Valdimiro Conceição	—N/a	Hélder Nascimento	Ana da Câmara Pereira	—N/a	—N/a	Leonor Dargent	António Cortez de Lobão	Pedro Pinto	—N/a
Braga	Filipe Costa	Maria Sofia Pereira	Teresa Mota	Francisco João Pereira	Mário Freitas	António Joaquim Mendes	Vasco Santos	Armando Caldas	Luís Ferreira Alves	Vítor Sêco	Gustavo Santos	Olga Baptista	Luís Campos Carvalho	Manuel Matias	Diogo Reis
Bragança	Manuel Vitorino	José Dengue	Margarida Bordalo	Carlos Lobo	—N/a	Jorge Barreto Filho	—N/a	José Macedo de Barros	Sandra Paiva e Sousa	—N/a	António José Lopes	Teresa Stanislau	Carlos Silvestre	Marco Nozedo	Manuel Carvalho
Castelo Branco	Victor Santos	Joaquim Pinto	Miguel Cardoso	Guilherme Aleixo Serra	Carla Soares Pimenta	Bruno Ferreira de Sousa	—N/a	—N/a	Luís Duque Vieira	—N/a	Fernando José Rocha	Maria Castello Branco	Ana Camilo Martins	José Augusto Dias	Jorge Azevedo
Coimbra	Susana Almeida	Rui da Cruz	Rui Mamede	Pedro Miguel Marques	Rui Armando Campos	—N/a	Sílvia Franklim Marques	Jorge Castilho Dores	António Oliveira	Paulo Delgado	Izabel Rocha Santos	Catarina Maia	João Carlos Navega	João Pacheco de Amorim	Nuno Pedreiro
Évora	Maria João Vieira	Rosário Conde	Glória Franco	Paulo Martins	José Luís Figueiral	Liliana Salvado	—N/a	António Inácio Jardim	José Manuel Vieira	—N/a	Gregório Matadinho	Alberto Cancelino	Ana Margarida Fonseca	Carlos Magno	Marco Ferreira
Faro	Anabela Restolho	Carlos Rias	Ana Sofia Marcelino	Madalena Pinto Coelho	Carlos Marcelino	Ana Sofia Gomes	—N/a	Luís Barroso	Rui Curado	—N/a	António Tavares	Bruno Mourão Martins	Telmo Martins	Jorge Rodrigues de Jesus	Carlos Aleixo
Guarda	Joaquim Corista	Miguel Ângelo Fonseca	Carlos Pinto	Manuel Pinheiro	Vítor Costa Santos	Inês Ferreira de Sousa	—N/a	Rui Jorge Cordeiro	António Maia	—N/a	Adriano Ferreira	Paulo Carmona	Ana Mendes	José Santos Marques	Hermínio Lemos
Leiria	Pedro Botelho Serra	Adelino Pereira	Filipe Honório	João Pais do Amaral	Amílcar Gaspar	Ruben Crasto	Luís Franklim Marques	Pedro Ladeira	Luís Duarte Almeida	Sérgio Gomes	Edite Veiga	Bernardo Blanco	Joana Ferraz	Luís Paulo Fernandes	Márcia Henriques
Lisbon	Pedro Pardal Henriques	**Cidália Guerreiro**	Joacine Katar Moreira	**José Pinto Coelho**	**Manuel Ramos**	Gonçalo Madaleno (Note: Amândio Madaleno, the leader of PTP, was the second candidate of the list.)	**Gil Garcia**	**Mendo Castro Henriques**	**Gonçalo da Câmara Pereira**	—N/a	**Fernando Loureiro**	João Cotrim de Figueiredo	**Pedro Santana Lopes**	**André Ventura**	Ilídia Loureiro
Portalegre	Nelson Rodrigues	António Corricas	Isabel Alfacinha	Joaquim Vaz Rato	Alexandre Oliveira	Manuel Fidalgo	—N/a	—N/a	—N/a	—N/a	António Martins de Matos	Mariana Nina	Carlos Carolino	Júlio Paixão	Albino Silva
Porto	**António Marinho e Pinto**	João Paulo Monteiro	Jorge Pinto	Vítor Ramalho	Iolanda Rocha	Artur Silva Martins	Renata Cambra	Miguel Alcoforado	Manuel Cardoso de Carvalho	Leonor Fonseca	Germano Miranda	**Carlos Guimarães Pinto**	Bruno Ferreira da Costa	Hugo Ernano	**Vitorino Silva**
Santarém	João Vaz Lopes	José Boia Nobre	Pedro Mendonça	Carlos Teles	Vasco Gaião	Américo Costa	—N/a	Ana Cristina Carnaça	Luís Arnaut Pombeiro	—N/a	Evandre Francisco	João Pita Soares	Rui Paulo Sousa	Pedro Cassiano Neves	Carlos Alberto Oliveira
Setúbal	Bruno Fialho	Leonel Coelho	Ana Raposo Marques	João Patrocínio	Vítor Lobão	Rute Faleiro Inácio	Manuel Afonso	Carlos Martins	Jorge Ângelo	—N/a	Dário Fonseca	Diogo Prates	Carlos Medeiros	Nuno Afonso	António Rosa Carvalho
Viana do Castelo	Rute Araújo	António Botelho	Filipe Faro da Costa	Bruno Rebelo	Telmo Parada	António Matanço	—N/a	Hélder Frias Pena	Hugo Duarte	Luís Videira	Armando Silva	António Lúcio Baptista	Jorge Nuno de Sá	Lopo Pacheco de Amorim	Vanessa Sá
Vila Real	Lígia Correia da Cruz	Miguel Carvalho	Teresa Fernandes	Isabel Montalvão e Silva	—N/a	—N/a	—N/a	Orlando Cruz	Silvia Correia	—N/a	—N/a	Rui Paiva	Maria João Gaspar	José Pereira Dias	João Cabeço
Viseu	Manuel Henrique Prior	José Dias da Cruz	Sónia Veiga	Patrícia Araújo	Norberto Albuquerque	Daniela Ramos	—N/a	António Augusto Barreto	José Américo Pereira	João Mendes	Armando Formoso	Filipe Barbosa	Pedro Escada	João Tilly	Ludgero Silva
Azores	Sandra Furtado Soares	José Afonso Lourdes	Filipa Castro	Roque Almeida	Pedro Soares Pimenta	Celina Mendonça	Eduardo Jorge Pereira	—N/a	Paulo Estêvão	—N/a	—N/a	Ana Vasconcelos Martins	Jorge Medeiros	Joaquim Chilrito	—N/a
Madeira	Filipe Rebelo	Humberto Freitas	Pedro Nunes Rodrigues	António Araújo	Fernando Rodrigues	José Manuel Coelho	—N/a	Pedro Marques de Sousa	João Carlos Oliveira	Lina Pereira	Fernando Teixeira	Duarte Gouveia	Joaquim Batalha de Sousa	Miguel Teixeira	Fernando Góis
Europe	Carlos Eduardo Pinto	Ana Rita Pinto	David Tanganho	Patrícia Manguinhas	João Francisco Silva	Carlos Tomás Nogueira	José Sebastião	Sérgio Gave Fraga	Lopo Cancella de Abreu	Paulo Viana	João Manuel Rodrigues	Suzanne Rodrigues	António Marques da Costa	Luís Martelo	Ana Couto Vieira
Outside Europe	Fernando Albarran	José António Louçã	Geizy Fernandes	Jorge Almeida	Francisco Gomes Silva	Jacqueline Delonghi	—N/a	Renato Epifânio	Christian Baums Hohn	Joaquim Alves	Maria Manuela Fernandes	Filipa Sant'Ana Pereira	Tiago Sousa Dias	Paulo Trindade da Silva	Isabel Cerqueira
Sources															

== Elected candidates ==
=== Aveiro ===
==== Socialist Party ====
- Pedro Nuno Santos
- Cláudia Cruz Santos
- Carlos Neto Brandão
- Porfírio Silva
- Susana Correia
- Hugo Oliveira
- Joana Sá Pereira

==== Social Democratic Party ====
- Ana Miguel dos Santos
- António Topa
- Helga Correia
- Bruno Coimbra
- André Neves
- Carla Madureira

==== Left Bloc ====
- Moisés Ferreira
- Nelson Peralta

==== CDS – People's Party ====
- João Almeida

=== Beja ===
==== Socialist Party ====
- Pedro do Carmo
- Telma Guerreiro

==== Unitary Democratic Coalition ====
- João Dias (PCP)

=== Braga ===
==== Socialist Party ====
- Sónia Fertuzinhos
- José Gomes Mendes
- Maria Begonha
- Joaquim Barreto
- Hugo Pires
- Palmira Maciel
- Luís Carvalho Soares
- Nuno Sá

==== Social Democratic Party ====
- André Coelho Lima
- Firmino Marques
- Clara Marques Mendes
- Carlos Eduardo Reis
- Jorge Paulo Oliveira
- Maria Gabriela Fonseca
- Emídio Guerreiro
- Rui Silva

==== Left Bloc ====
- José Maria Cardoso
- Alexandra Vieira

==== CDS – People's Party ====
- Telmo Correia

=== Bragança ===
==== Social Democratic Party ====
- Adão Silva
- Isabel Lopes

==== Socialist Party ====
- Jorge Nogueiro Gomes

=== Castelo Branco ===
==== Socialist Party ====
- Hortense Martins
- Eurico Brilhante Dias
- Nuno Fazenda

==== Social Democratic Party ====
- Cláudia André

=== Coimbra ===
==== Socialist Party ====
- Marta Temido
- Pedro Coimbra
- João Ataíde
- Cristina Jesus
- Tiago Estêvão Martins

==== Social Democratic Party ====
- Mónica Quintela
- António Maló de Abreu
- Paulo Leitão

==== Left Bloc ====
- José Manuel Pureza

=== Évora ===
==== Socialist Party ====
- Luís Capoulas Santos
- Norberto Patinho

==== Unitary Democratic Coalition ====
- João Oliveira (PCP)

=== Faro ===
==== Socialist Party ====
- Jamila Madeira
- José Apolinário
- Jorge Botelho
- Joaquina Matos
- Luís Graça

==== Social Democratic Party ====
- Cristóvão Norte
- Rui Cristina
- Ofélia Ramos

==== Left Bloc ====
- João Vasconcelos

=== Guarda ===
==== Socialist Party ====
- Ana Mendes Godinho
- António Santinho Pacheco

==== Social Democratic Party ====
- Carlos Peixoto

=== Leiria ===
==== Social Democratic Party ====
- Margarida Balseiro Lopes
- Hugo Patrício de Oliveira
- Pedro Roque
- Olga Silvestre
- João Marques

==== Socialist Party ====
- Raul Miguel de Castro
- Elza Pais
- António Lacerda Sales
- João Paulo Pedrosa

==== Left Bloc ====
- Ricardo Vicente

=== Lisbon ===
==== Socialist Party ====
- António Costa
- Edite Estrela
- Eduardo Ferro Rodrigues
- Mariana Vieira da Silva
- Mário Centeno
- Graça Fonseca
- João Gomes Cravinho
- Maria da Luz Rosinha
- Marcos Perestrello
- Susana Amador
- Sérgio Sousa Pinto
- Maria de Fátima Fonseca
- Pedro Delgado Alves
- Ana Sofia Antunes
- Jorge Lacão
- Isabel Moreira
- Pedro Cegonho
- Ricardo Leão
- Romualda Fernandes
- Miguel Costa Matos

==== Social Democratic Party ====
- Filipa Roseta
- José Silvano
- Pedro Augusto Pinto
- Isabel Meirelles
- Luís Marques Guedes
- Duarte Pacheco
- Sandra Pereira
- Ricardo Baptista Leite
- Pedro Rodrigues
- Lina Lopes
- Carlos Silva
- Alexandre Poço

==== Left Bloc ====
- Mariana Mortágua
- Pedro Filipe Soares
- Beatriz Gomes Dias
- Jorge Costa
- Isabel Pires

==== Unitary Democratic Coalition ====
- Jerónimo de Sousa (PCP)
- Alma Rivera (PCP)
- Duarte Alves (PCP)
- Mariana Silva (PEV)

==== People Animals Nature ====
- André Silva
- Inês Sousa Real

==== CDS – People's Party ====
- Assunção Cristas
- Ana Rita Bessa

==== Liberal Initiative ====
- João Cotrim de Figueiredo

==== LIVRE ====
- Joacine Katar Moreira

==== Chega ====
- André Ventura

=== Portalegre ===
==== Socialist Party ====
- Luís Moreira Testa
- Ricardo Pinheiro

=== Porto ===
==== Socialist Party ====
- Alexandre Quintanilha
- Rosário Gambôa
- João Pedro Matos Fernandes
- Ana Paula Vitorino
- José Luís Carneiro
- Cristina Mendes da Silva
- João Paulo Correia
- Tiago Barbosa Ribeiro
- Isabel Oneto
- João Torres
- Pedro Bacelar de Vasconcelos
- Joana Ferreira Lima
- Pedro Valente de Sousa
- Constança Urbano de Sousa
- José Magalhães
- Hugo Carvalho
- Carla Sousa

==== Social Democratic Party ====
- Hugo Martins de Carvalho
- Rui Rio
- Catarina Rocha Ferreira
- Alberto Machado
- José Cancela Moura
- Germana Rocha
- Afonso Oliveira
- Álvaro Almeida
- Sofia Matos
- Alberto Fonseca
- Paulo Rios de Oliveira
- Carla Barros
- Hugo Carneiro
- António Cunha
- Márcia Passos

==== Left Bloc ====
- Catarina Martins
- José Soeiro
- Luís Monteiro
- Maria Manuel Rola

==== Unitary Democratic Coalition ====
- Diana Ferreira (PCP)
- Ana Mesquita (PCP)

==== People Animals Nature ====
- Bebiana Cunha

==== CDS – People's Party ====
- Cecília Meireles

=== Santarém ===
==== Socialist Party ====
- Alexandra Leitão
- António Gameiro
- Maria do Céu Antunes
- Hugo Costa

==== Social Democratic Party ====
- Isaura Morais
- João Moura
- Duarte Marques

==== Left Bloc ====
- Fabíola Cardoso

==== Unitary Democratic Coalition ====
- António Filipe

=== Setúbal ===
==== Socialist Party ====
- Ana Catarina Mendes
- Eduardo Cabrita
- Eurídice Pereira
- João Galamba
- Ricardo Mourinho Félix
- Catarina Marcelino
- Maria Antónia Almeida Santos
- Filipa Pacheco
- André Pinotes Batista

==== Unitary Democratic Coalition ====
- Francisco Lopes (PCP)
- Paula Santos (PCP)
- José Luís Ferreira (PEV)

==== Social Democratic Party ====
- Nuno Carvalho
- Fernando Negrão
- Fernanda Velez

==== Left Bloc ====
- Joana Mortágua
- Sandra Cunha

==== People Animals Nature ====
- Cristina Rodrigues

=== Viana do Castelo ===
==== Socialist Party ====
- Tiago Brandão Rodrigues
- Marina Gonçalves
- Anabela Sousa Rodrigues

==== Social Democratic Party ====
- Jorge Salgueiro Mendes
- Emília Cerqueira
- Eduardo Teixeira

=== Vila Real ===
==== Social Democratic Party ====
- Luís Leite Ramos
- Cláudia Bento
- Artur Soveral Andrade

==== Socialist Party ====
- Ascenso Simões
- Francisco Rocha

=== Viseu ===
==== Social Democratic Party ====
- Fernando Ruas
- Pedro Alves
- Fátima Borges
- António Lima Costa

==== Socialist Party ====
- João Azevedo
- Lúcia Araújo Silva
- João Paulo Rebelo
- José Rui Cruz

=== Azores ===
==== Socialist Party ====
- Isabel Rodrigues
- Lara Martinho
- João Azevedo e Castro

==== Social Democratic Party ====
- Paulo Moniz
- António Ventura

=== Madeira ===
==== Social Democratic Party ====
- Miguel Albuquerque
- Sérgio Marques
- Sara Madruga da Costa

==== Socialist Party ====
- Carlos João Pereira
- Olavo Câmara
- Marta Freitas

=== Europe ===
==== Socialist Party ====
- Paulo Pisco

==== Social Democratic Party ====
- Carlos Alberto Gonçalves

=== Outside Europe ===
==== Social Democratic Party ====
- José Cesário

==== Socialist Party ====
- Augusto Santos Silva

== See also ==
- List of political parties in Portugal
- Party lists for the 2022 Portuguese legislative election
- Party lists for the 2024 Portuguese legislative election
- Party lists for the 2025 Portuguese legislative election
