= Marta Freitas =

Marta Freitas may refer to:

- Marta Pen (Marta Filipa Pen Oliveira Freitas), Portuguese athlete
- Marta Freitas (politician), Portuguese politician
