= Paula Margarido =

Portuguese lawyer and politician

Paula Cristina Baptista Margarido
- Margarido in 2025

Member of the Assembly of the Republic
- Constituency: Madeira
- Incumbent
- Assumed office 26 March 2024

Personal details
- Born: 29 April 1974 (age 52) Pampilhosa da Serra, Portugal
- Party: Social Democratic Party
- Education: Catholic University of Portugal
- Occupation: Lawyer • politician

Paula Cristina Baptista Margarido (born 1974) is a Portuguese lawyer who was elected to the Assembly of the Republic of Portugal as a member of the Social Democratic Party (PSD), in the March 2024 national election to represent the Madeira constituency.

== Early life ==
Margarido was born on 29 April 1974 in Pampilhosa da Serra in the centre of Portugal. She obtained a degree in law from the Faculty of Law of the Lisbon campus of the Catholic University of Portugal in 1997, postgraduate qualifications in accounting and finance for jurists and in advanced taxation, from the Porto Business School of the same university, and a master's degree, from the same university with the thesis "The right of retention attributed to the promisor-buyer within the scope of the insolvency process of the promisor-seller".

== Career ==
Margarido was registered as a lawyer in November 1999 and since then has held various positions in law companies. In 2017 she became vice-president of the Madeira Regional Council of the Portuguese Bar Association, and was president of the same association between 2019 and 2022. In 2021 she became a member of the general council of the University of Madeira. An active Catholic, she first became president of the Commission for Monitoring Children, Young People and Vulnerable People of the Diocese of Funchal, in which capacity she was received in an audience by Pope Francis to discuss sexual abuse in the Catholic Church. In July 2023 she took on the role of president of the national commission of 21 dioceses investigating sexual abuse matters, a position she withdrew from after being nominated as a candidate in the 2024 national election.

== Political career ==
Following the decision of the president of Portugal, Marcelo Rebelo de Sousa in November 2023 to call a new election, after prime minister António Costa's resignation following an investigation into alleged corruption in his government involving the award of contracts for lithium and hydrogen businesses, Margarido was chosen as the second candidate of the Democratic Alliance (DA) coalition for the Madeira constituency. The DA won three of the six available seats and she was duly elected. She had not previously held any political position.
