= Vânia Jesus =

Portuguese politician from Madeira

Member of the Assembly of the Republic
- Incumbent
- Assumed office 3 June 2025
- Constituency: Madeira
- In office 15 October 2009 – 19 June 2011
- Constituency: Madeira

Member of the Legislative Assembly of Madeira
- In office 20 June 2011 – 9 October 2017
- In office 29 May 2007 – 13 October 2009

Personal details
- Born: Vânia Andrea de Castro Jesus; 17 January 1979 (age 47) Santa Cruz, Madeira, Portugal
- Party: Social Democratic Party
- Education: ISCTE – University Institute of Lisbon; Complutense University of Madrid

Vânia Andrea de Castro Jesus (born 17 January 1979) is a Portuguese politician. A member of the Social Democratic Party (PSD), she represented the Autonomous Region of Madeira in the Assembly of the Republic of Portugal between 2009 and 2011.

== Early life ==
Vânia Andrea de Castro Jesus was born in Santa Cruz, Madeira on 17 January 1979. In 2000, she obtained a degree from the Higher Institute of Business and Labour Sciences – ISCTE in Lisbon, in modern and contemporary history, specialising in cultural management. She received a Master's in European political theory from the Complutense University of Madrid in 2006.

== Political career ==
After completing her first degree, Jesus worked for the newspaper Jornal da Madeira, for Rádio Jornal da Madeira, and at the municipality of Santa Cruz. After obtaining her second degree she became an advisor to the PSD Parliamentary Group at the Madeira Regional Assembly and between 2008 and 2011 she was leader of the youth wing of Madeira's PSD. She was elected deputy to the Legislative Assembly of Madeira in 2007 and was elected to the Assembly of the Republic of Portugal in 2009, where she served on the European Affairs and Education and Science committees. After losing her seat in the national parliament she returned to the Madeira assembly, being re-elected in 2011 and 2015 and leaving in 2017. In addition, she served on the Parish Assembly of Gaula between 2008 and 2009 and on the Municipal Assembly of Santa Cruz between 2013 and 2017.

== Other activities ==
From 2017, Jesus was appointed as chair of the Board of Directors of the Madeira social housing company, Investimentos Habitacionais da Madeira, which had as its goal the construction, management and rehabilitation of housing for needy families. In late-2019 she transferred from that position to become Chair of the Madeira Employment Institute.
