= Carlos Lélis =

Portuguese politician (1931–2021)

- Born: 31 October 1931
- Died: 2 November 2021 (aged 90)
- Occupation: Politician

Carlos Lélis (31 October 1931 – 2 November 2021) was a Portuguese politician who served as an MP, representing the Social Democratic Party. He represented the constituency of Madeira and was at one time responsible for the department of education.
