= Madeira (Assembly of the Republic constituency) =

Constituency of the Assembly of the Republic, the national legislature of Portugal

- Constituency for the Assembly of the Republic
- Location of Madeira within the Atlantic region
- Autonomous Region: Madeira
- Population: 259,440 (2024)
- Electorate: 255,801 (2025)
- Area: 801 km^{2} (2024)

Current Constituency
- Created: 1976
- Seats: List: 6 (2005–present); 5 (1979–2005); 6 (1976–1979)
- Deputies: List: Emanuel Câmara (PS); Pedro Coelho (PSD); Francisco Gomes (CH); Vânia Jesus (PSD); Paulo Neves (PSD); Filipe Sousa (JPP)

Madeira is one of the 22 multi-member constituencies of the Assembly of the Republic, the national legislature of Portugal. The constituency was established as Funchal in 1976 when the Assembly of the Republic was established by the constitution following the restoration of democracy. It was renamed Madeira in 1979 after Portugal's Atlantic islands were granted autonomy. It is conterminous with the autonomous region of Madeira. The constituency currently elects six of the 230 members of the Assembly of the Republic using the closed party-list proportional representation electoral system. At the 2025 legislative election it had 255,801 registered electors.

== Electoral system ==
Madeira currently elects six of the 230 members of the Assembly of the Republic using the closed party-list proportional representation electoral system. Seats are allocated using the D'Hondt method.

== Election results ==
=== Summary ===
Election	Unitary Democrats CDU / APU / PCP			Left Bloc BE / UDP			LIVRE L			Socialists PS			People Animals Nature PAN			Democratic Renewal PRD			Social Democrats PSD / MP / PPD			Liberals IL			CDS – People's CDS–PP / CDS			Chega CH / PPV/CDC / PPV		
Election	Votes	%	Seats	Votes	%	Seats	Votes	%	Seats	Votes	%	Seats	Votes	%	Seats	Votes	%	Seats	Votes	%	Seats	Votes	%	Seats	Votes	%	Seats	Votes	%	Seats
2025	1,758	1.29%	0	1,871	1.37%	0	1,750	1.28%	0	18,704	13.70%	1	1,450	1.06%	0				57,440	42.07%	3	3,665	2.68%	0				29,048	21.27%	1
2024	2,429	1.66%	0	4,404	3.01%	0	1,864	1.27%	0	29,725	20.32%	2	3,127	2.14%	0				52,989	36.22%	3	5,827	3.98%	0				26,304	17.98%	1
2022	2,582	2.08%	0	4,120	3.32%	0	913	0.74%	0	40,006	32.26%	3	2,084	1.68%	0				50,636	40.83%	3	4,243	3.42%	0				7,730	6.23%	0
2019	2,703	2.13%	0	6,810	5.37%	0	480	0.38%	0	43,374	34.17%	3	2,362	1.86%	0				48,328	38.07%	3	922	0.73%	0	7,852	6.19%	0	912	0.72%	0
2015	4,467	3.71%	0	13,392	11.11%	1	1,259	1.04%	0	26,208	21.75%	2	2,185	1.81%	0				47,176	39.14%	3				7,496	6.22%	0			
2011	5,096	3.80%	0	5,568	4.15%	0				20,360	15.17%	1	2,385	1.78%	0				68,620	51.14%	4				18,977	14.14%	1			
2009	5,796	4.33%	0	8,486	6.35%	0				26,735	19.99%	1							66,190	49.49%	4				15,300	11.44%	1			
2005	4,991	3.66%	0	5,265	3.86%	0				49,122	35.98%	3							63,523	46.53%	3				9,215	6.75%	0			
2002	3,128	2.55%	0	3,911	3.19%	0				32,335	26.39%	1							67,094	54.76%	4				15,185	12.39%	0			
1999	3,428	2.89%	0	1,481	1.25%	0				42,637	35.93%	2							56,205	47.36%	3				13,209	11.13%	0			
1995	1,737	1.34%	0	3,654	2.82%	0				43,622	33.61%	2							61,196	47.15%	3				17,157	13.22%	0			
1991	1,187	0.97%	0	5,783	4.72%	0				25,190	20.55%	1				600	0.49%	0	78,069	63.69%	4				7,602	6.20%	0			
1987	2,276	1.96%	0	3,648	3.14%	0				19,288	16.59%	1				3,916	3.37%	0	77,829	66.93%	4				6,200	5.33%	0			
1985	3,939	3.32%	0	6,113	5.15%	0				15,976	13.47%	1				11,723	9.88%	0	68,928	58.11%	4				9,463	7.98%	0			
1983	3,300	2.87%	0	3,212	2.79%	0				28,888	25.10%	1							66,611	57.87%	4				9,734	8.46%	0			
1980	3,621	3.00%	0	5,578	4.63%	0				20,531	17.02%	1							78,981	65.49%	4				8,298	6.88%	0			
1979	3,891	3.14%	0	8,438	6.82%	0				21,921	17.71%	1							73,629	59.50%	4				14,005	11.32%	0			
1976	1,667	1.49%	0	1,492	1.34%	0				28,645	25.68%	1							60,925	54.63%	4				15,310	13.73%	1			

(Figures in italics represent alliances.)

=== Detailed ===
==== 2020s ====
===== 2025 =====
Results of the 2025 legislative election held on 18 May 2025:

Party		Votes	%	Seats
Democratic Alliance	AD	57,440	42.07%	3
Chega	CH	29,048	21.27%	1
Socialist Party	PS	18,704	13.70%	1
Together for the People	JPP	17,113	12.53%	1
Liberal Initiative	IL	3,665	2.68%	0
Left Bloc	BE	1,871	1.37%	0
Unitary Democratic Coalition	CDU	1,758	1.29%	0
LIVRE	L	1,750	1.28%	0
National Democratic Alternative	ADN	1,551	1.14%	0
People Animals Nature	PAN	1,450	1.06%	0
People's Monarchist Party	PPM	452	0.33%	0
New Right	ND	434	0.32%	0
Portuguese Labour Party	PTP	425	0.31%	0
Earth Party	PT	356	0.26%	0
React, Include, Recycle	RIR	346	0.25%	0
Ergue-te	E	186	0.14%	0
Valid votes		136,549	100.00%	6
Blank votes		549	0.40%	
Rejected votes – other		1,839	1.32%	
Total polled		138,937	54.31%	
Registered electors		255,801		

The following candidates were elected:: Emanuel Câmara (PS); Pedro Coelho (AD); Francisco Gomes (CH); Vânia Jesus (AD); Paulo Neves (AD); and Filipe Sousa (JPP).

===== 2024 =====
Results of the 2024 legislative election held on 10 March 2024:

Party		Votes	%	Seats
Madeira First	MP	52,989	36.22%	3
Socialist Party	PS	29,725	20.32%	2
Chega	CH	26,304	17.98%	1
Together for the People	JPP	14,344	9.80%	0
Liberal Initiative	IL	5,827	3.98%	0
Left Bloc	BE	4,404	3.01%	0
People Animals Nature	PAN	3,127	2.14%	0
Unitary Democratic Coalition	CDU	2,429	1.66%	0
National Democratic Alternative	ADN	2,348	1.60%	0
LIVRE	L	1,864	1.27%	0
React, Include, Recycle	RIR	725	0.50%	0
Portuguese Labour Party	PTP	719	0.49%	0
People's Monarchist Party	PPM	451	0.31%	0
We, the Citizens!	NC	305	0.21%	0
Volt Portugal	Volt	283	0.19%	0
Ergue-te	E	239	0.16%	0
Alternative 21 (Earth Party and Alliance)	PT-A	228	0.16%	0
Valid votes		146,311	100.00%	6
Blank votes		794	0.53%	
Rejected votes – other		2,703	1.80%	
Total polled		149,808	58.86%	
Registered electors		254,502		

The following candidates were elected: Paulo Cafôfo (PS); Pedro Coelho (MP); Francisco Gomes (CH); Miguel Iglésias (PS); Paula Margarido (MP); and Paulo Neves (MP).

===== 2022 =====
Results of the 2022 legislative election held on 30 January 2022:

Party		Votes	%	Seats
Madeira First	MP	50,636	40.83%	3
Socialist Party	PS	40,006	32.26%	3
Together for the People	JPP	8,722	7.03%	0
Chega	CH	7,730	6.23%	0
Liberal Initiative	IL	4,243	3.42%	0
Left Bloc	BE	4,120	3.32%	0
Unitary Democratic Coalition	CDU	2,582	2.08%	0
People Animals Nature	PAN	2,084	1.68%	0
LIVRE	L	913	0.74%	0
Portuguese Labour Party	PTP	689	0.56%	0
React, Include, Recycle	RIR	554	0.45%	0
National Democratic Alternative	ADN	548	0.44%	0
Earth Party	PT	462	0.37%	0
People's Monarchist Party	PPM	260	0.21%	0
Socialist Alternative Movement	MAS	244	0.20%	0
Ergue-te	E	234	0.19%	0
Valid votes		124,027	100.00%	6
Blank votes		781	0.61%	
Rejected votes – other		2,312	1.82%	
Total polled		127,120	49.89%	
Registered electors		254,784		

The following candidates were elected: Sara Madruga da Costa (MP); Patrícia Dantas (MP); Marta Freitas (PS); Miguel Iglésias (PS); Sérgio Marques (MP); and Carlos Pereira (PS).

==== 2010s ====
===== 2019 =====
Results of the 2019 legislative election held on 6 October 2019:

Party		Votes	%	Seats
Social Democratic Party	PSD	48,328	38.07%	3
Socialist Party	PS	43,374	34.17%	3
CDS – People's Party	CDS–PP	7,852	6.19%	0
Together for the People	JPP	7,125	5.61%	0
Left Bloc	BE	6,810	5.37%	0
Unitary Democratic Coalition	CDU	2,703	2.13%	0
People Animals Nature	PAN	2,362	1.86%	0
React, Include, Recycle	RIR	1,185	0.93%	0
Portuguese Labour Party	PTP	1,182	0.93%	0
Liberal Initiative	IL	922	0.73%	0
Chega	CH	912	0.72%	0
United Party of Retirees and Pensioners	PURP	801	0.63%	0
Portuguese Workers' Communist Party	PCTP	789	0.62%	0
Alliance	A	629	0.50%	0
LIVRE	L	480	0.38%	0
Earth Party	PT	465	0.37%	0
Democratic Republican Party	PDR	443	0.35%	0
National Renewal Party	PNR	201	0.16%	0
We, the Citizens!	NC	188	0.15%	0
People's Monarchist Party	PPM	180	0.14%	0
Valid votes		126,931	100.00%	6
Blank votes		688	0.53%	
Rejected votes – other		2,301	1.77%	
Total polled		129,920	50.38%	
Registered electors		257,902		

The following candidates were elected: Miguel Albuquerque (PSD); Olavo Câmara (PS); Sara Madruga da Costa (PSD); Marta Freitas (PS); Sérgio Marques (PSD); and Carlos Pereira (PS).

===== 2015 =====
Results of the 2015 legislative election held on 4 October 2015:

Party		Votes	%	Seats
Social Democratic Party	PSD	47,176	39.14%	3
Socialist Party	PS	26,208	21.75%	2
Left Bloc	BE	13,392	11.11%	1
Together for the People	JPP	8,670	7.19%	0
CDS – People's Party	CDS–PP	7,496	6.22%	0
Unitary Democratic Coalition	CDU	4,467	3.71%	0
People Animals Nature	PAN	2,185	1.81%	0
Democratic Republican Party	PDR	2,147	1.78%	0
The Earth Party Movement	MPT	1,747	1.45%	0
Portuguese Labour Party	PTP	1,744	1.45%	0
Portuguese Workers' Communist Party	PCTP	1,592	1.32%	0
LIVRE	L	1,259	1.04%	0
We, the Citizens!	NC	1,125	0.93%	0
National Renewal Party	PNR	785	0.65%	0
People's Monarchist Party	PPM	526	0.44%	0
Valid votes		120,519	100.00%	6
Blank votes		1,028	0.82%	
Rejected votes – other		3,586	2.87%	
Total polled		125,133	48.85%	
Registered electors		256,146		

The following candidates were elected: Paulino Ascenção (BE); Rubina Berardo (PSD); Sara Madruga da Costa (PSD); Paulo Neves (PSD); Carlos Pereira (PS); and Luís Vilhena (PS).

===== 2011 =====
Results of the 2011 legislative election held on 5 June 2011:

Party		Votes	%	Seats
Social Democratic Party	PSD	68,620	51.14%	4
Socialist Party	PS	20,360	15.17%	1
CDS – People's Party	CDS–PP	18,977	14.14%	1
Left Bloc	BE	5,568	4.15%	0
Unitary Democratic Coalition	CDU	5,096	3.80%	0
New Democracy Party	ND	4,037	3.01%	0
Portuguese Labour Party	PTP	2,992	2.23%	0
The Earth Party Movement	MPT	2,560	1.91%	0
Party for Animals and Nature	PAN	2,385	1.78%	0
Portuguese Workers' Communist Party	PCTP	1,967	1.47%	0
National Renewal Party	PNR	617	0.46%	0
People's Monarchist Party	PPM	538	0.40%	0
Hope for Portugal Movement	MEP	461	0.34%	0
Valid votes		134,178	100.00%	6
Blank votes		1,642	1.18%	
Rejected votes – other		3,031	2.18%	
Total polled		138,851	54.30%	
Registered electors		255,716		

The following candidates were elected: Cláudia Monteiro de Aguiar (PSD); Alberto João Jardim (PSD); Correia de Jesus (PSD); José Manuel Rodrigues (CDS-PP); Jacinto Serrão (PS); and Guilherme Silva (PSD).

==== 2000s ====
===== 2009 =====
Results of the 2009 legislative election held on 27 September 2009:

Party		Votes	%	Seats
Social Democratic Party	PSD	66,190	49.49%	4
Socialist Party	PS	26,735	19.99%	1
CDS – People's Party	CDS–PP	15,300	11.44%	1
Left Bloc	BE	8,486	6.35%	0
Unitary Democratic Coalition	CDU	5,796	4.33%	0
New Democracy Party	ND	4,761	3.56%	0
The Earth Party Movement	MPT	2,885	2.16%	0
Portuguese Workers' Communist Party	PCTP	1,459	1.09%	0
People's Monarchist Party	PPM	726	0.54%	0
Hope for Portugal Movement	MEP	576	0.43%	0
National Renewal Party	PNR	482	0.36%	0
Merit and Society Movement	MMS	336	0.25%	0
Valid votes		133,732	100.00%	6
Blank votes		1,552	1.13%	
Rejected votes – other		2,323	1.69%	
Total polled		137,607	54.78%	
Registered electors		251,212		

The following candidates were elected: Alberto João Jardim (PSD); Correia de Jesus (PSD); Vânia Jesus (PSD); José Manuel Rodrigues (CDS-PP); Guilherme Silva (PSD); and Bernardo Trindade (PS).

===== 2005 =====
Results of the 2005 legislative election held on 20 February 2005:

Party		Votes	%	Seats
Social Democratic Party	PSD	63,523	46.53%	3
Socialist Party	PS	49,122	35.98%	3
CDS – People's Party	CDS–PP	9,215	6.75%	0
Left Bloc	BE	5,265	3.86%	0
Unitary Democratic Coalition	CDU	4,991	3.66%	0
New Democracy Party	ND	1,880	1.38%	0
Portuguese Workers' Communist Party	PCTP	1,624	1.19%	0
Humanist Party	PH	903	0.66%	0
Valid votes		136,523	100.00%	6
Blank votes		1,575	1.12%	
Rejected votes – other		2,323	1.65%	
Total polled		140,421	60.83%	
Registered electors		230,860		

The following candidates were elected: Maria Júlia Caré (PS); Alberto João Jardim (PSD); Correia de Jesus (PSD); Maximiano Martins (PS); Guilherme Silva (PSD); and Jacinto Serrão (PS).

===== 2002 =====
Results of the 2002 legislative election held on 17 March 2002:

Party		Votes	%	Seats
Social Democratic Party	PSD	67,094	54.76%	4
Socialist Party	PS	32,335	26.39%	1
CDS – People's Party	CDS–PP	15,185	12.39%	0
Left Bloc and Popular Democratic Union	BE-UDP	3,911	3.19%	0
Unitary Democratic Coalition	CDU	3,128	2.55%	0
Portuguese Workers' Communist Party	PCTP	870	0.71%	0
Valid votes		122,523	100.00%	5
Blank votes		1,082	0.86%	
Rejected votes – other		1,863	1.48%	
Total polled		125,468	59.09%	
Registered electors		212,335		

The following candidates were elected: Alberto João Jardim (PSD); Correia de Jesus (PSD); Maximiano Martins (PS); Guilherme Silva (PSD); and Hugo Velosa (PSD).

==== 1990s ====
===== 1999 =====
Results of the 1999 legislative election held on 10 October 1999:

Party		Votes	%	Seats
Social Democratic Party	PSD	56,205	47.36%	3
Socialist Party	PS	42,637	35.93%	2
CDS – People's Party	CDS–PP	13,209	11.13%	0
Unitary Democratic Coalition	CDU	3,428	2.89%	0
Left Bloc	BE	1,481	1.25%	0
Portuguese Workers' Communist Party	PCTP	651	0.55%	0
National Solidarity Party	PSN	571	0.48%	0
The Earth Party Movement	MPT	487	0.41%	0
Valid votes		118,669	100.00%	5
Blank votes		1,262	1.04%	
Rejected votes – other		1,727	1.42%	
Total polled		121,658	58.12%	
Registered electors		209,313		

The following candidates were elected: Gil França (PS); Alberto João Jardim (PSD); Correia de Jesus (PSD); Guilherme Silva (PSD); and Mota Torres (PS).

===== 1995 =====
Results of the 1995 legislative election held on 1 October 1995:

Party		Votes	%	Seats
Social Democratic Party	PSD	61,196	47.15%	3
Socialist Party	PS	43,622	33.61%	2
CDS – People's Party	CDS–PP	17,157	13.22%	0
Popular Democratic Union	UDP	3,654	2.82%	0
Unitary Democratic Coalition	CDU	1,737	1.34%	0
National Solidarity Party	PSN	873	0.67%	0
Revolutionary Socialist Party	PSR	453	0.35%	0
Portuguese Workers' Communist Party	PCTP	426	0.33%	0
The Earth Party Movement	MPT	346	0.27%	0
Democratic Party of the Atlantic	PDA	327	0.25%	0
Valid votes		129,791	100.00%	5
Blank votes		949	0.71%	
Rejected votes – other		2,026	1.53%	
Total polled		132,766	64.15%	
Registered electors		206,959		

The following candidates were elected: Luís Amado (PS); Alberto João Jardim (PSD); Correia de Jesus (PSD); Guilherme Silva (PSD); and António Trindade (PS).

===== 1991 =====
Results of the 1991 legislative election held on 6 October 1991:

Party		Votes	%	Seats
Social Democratic Party	PSD	78,069	63.69%	4
Socialist Party	PS	25,190	20.55%	1
Social Democratic Centre Party	CDS	7,602	6.20%	0
Popular Democratic Union	UDP	5,783	4.72%	0
National Solidarity Party	PSN	2,315	1.89%	0
Unitary Democratic Coalition	CDU	1,187	0.97%	0
Democratic Renewal Party	PRD	600	0.49%	0
Democratic Party of the Atlantic	PDA	519	0.42%	0
Revolutionary Socialist Party	PSR	493	0.40%	0
People's Monarchist Party	PPM	425	0.35%	0
Portuguese Workers' Communist Party	PCTP	384	0.31%	0
Valid votes		122,567	100.00%	5
Blank votes		808	0.65%	
Rejected votes – other		1,667	1.33%	
Total polled		125,042	64.16%	
Registered electors		194,899		

The following candidates were elected: Jardim Fernandes (PS); Alberto João Jardim (PSD); Correia de Jesus (PSD); Carlos Lelis (PSD); and Guilherme Silva (PSD).

==== 1980s ====
===== 1987 =====
Results of the 1987 legislative election held on 19 July 1987:

Party		Votes	%	Seats
Social Democratic Party	PSD	77,829	66.93%	4
Socialist Party	PS	19,288	16.59%	1
Social Democratic Centre Party	CDS	6,200	5.33%	0
Democratic Renewal Party	PRD	3,916	3.37%	0
Popular Democratic Union	UDP	3,648	3.14%	0
Unitary Democratic Coalition	CDU	2,276	1.96%	0
Revolutionary Socialist Party	PSR	1,008	0.87%	0
Christian Democratic Party	PDC	829	0.71%	0
Portuguese Workers' Communist Party	PCTP	532	0.46%	0
People's Monarchist Party	PPM	416	0.36%	0
Portuguese Democratic Movement	MDP	345	0.30%	0
Valid votes		116,287	100.00%	5
Blank votes		1,009	0.85%	
Rejected votes – other		1,611	1.35%	
Total polled		118,907	67.16%	
Registered electors		177,049		

The following candidates were elected: Cecília Catarino (PSD); Alberto João Jardim (PSD); Correia de Jesus (PSD); Carlos Lelis (PSD); and Mota Torres (PS).

===== 1985 =====
Results of the 1985 legislative election held on 6 October 1985:

Party		Votes	%	Seats
Social Democratic Party	PSD	68,928	58.11%	4
Socialist Party	PS	15,976	13.47%	1
Democratic Renewal Party	PRD	11,723	9.88%	0
Social Democratic Centre Party	CDS	9,463	7.98%	0
Popular Democratic Union	UDP	6,113	5.15%	0
United People Alliance	APU	3,939	3.32%	0
Revolutionary Socialist Party	PSR	769	0.65%	0
Christian Democratic Party	PDC	704	0.59%	0
Workers' Party of Socialist Unity	POUS	527	0.44%	0
Portuguese Workers' Communist Party	PCTP	475	0.40%	0
Valid votes		118,617	100.00%	5
Blank votes		864	0.71%	
Rejected votes – other		1,960	1.61%	
Total polled		121,441	69.74%	
Registered electors		174,139		

The following candidates were elected: Cecília Catarino (PSD); Francisco Jardim (PSD); Correia de Jesus (PSD); Virgílio Pereira (PSD); and Mota Torres (PS).

===== 1983 =====
Results of the 1983 legislative election held on 25 April 1983:

Party		Votes	%	Seats
Social Democratic Party	PSD	66,611	57.87%	4
Socialist Party	PS	28,888	25.10%	1
Social Democratic Centre Party	CDS	9,734	8.46%	0
United People Alliance	APU	3,300	2.87%	0
Popular Democratic Union	UDP	3,212	2.79%	0
Democratic Party of the Atlantic	PDA	1,020	0.89%	0
Christian Democratic Party	PDC	695	0.60%	0
Revolutionary Socialist Party	PSR	483	0.42%	0
Workers' Party of Socialist Unity	POUS	457	0.40%	0
Portuguese Workers' Communist Party	PCTP	358	0.31%	0
Socialist Workers League	LST	339	0.29%	0
Valid votes		115,097	100.00%	5
Blank votes		603	0.51%	
Rejected votes – other		2,743	2.32%	
Total polled		118,443	73.41%	
Registered electors		161,352		

The following candidates were elected: Cecília Catarino (PSD); Jardim Fernandes (PS); Correia de Jesus (PSD); Jorge Mendonça (PSD); and Virgílio Pereira (PSD).

===== 1980 =====
Results of the 1980 legislative election held on 5 October 1980:

Party		Votes	%	Seats
Social Democratic Party	PSD	78,981	65.49%	4
Socialist Party	PS	20,531	17.02%	1
Social Democratic Centre Party	CDS	8,298	6.88%	0
Popular Democratic Union	UDP	5,578	4.63%	0
United People Alliance	APU	3,621	3.00%	0
Democratic Party of the Atlantic	PDA	1,792	1.49%	0
Christian Democratic Party, Independent Movement for the National Reconstruction / Party of the Portuguese Right and National Front	PDC- MIRN/ PDP- FN	415	0.34%	0
Portuguese Workers' Communist Party	PCTP	390	0.32%	0
Labour Party	PT	356	0.30%	0
Revolutionary Socialist Party	PSR	356	0.30%	0
Workers' Party of Socialist Unity	POUS	278	0.23%	0
Valid votes		120,596	100.00%	5
Blank votes		1,238	1.00%	
Rejected votes – other		2,304	1.86%	
Total polled		124,138	80.90%	
Registered electors		153,439		

The following candidates were elected: Cecília Catarino (PSD); João Sá Fernandes (PSD); António Vieira Freitas (PSD); Nicolau de Freitas (PSD); and Correia de Jesus (PSD).

==== 1970s ====
===== 1979 =====
Results of the 1979 legislative election held on 2 December 1979:

Party		Votes	%	Seats
Social Democratic Party	PSD	73,629	59.50%	4
Socialist Party	PS	21,921	17.71%	1
Social Democratic Centre Party	CDS	14,005	11.32%	0
Popular Democratic Union	UDP	8,438	6.82%	0
United People Alliance	APU	3,891	3.14%	0
Portuguese Workers' Communist Party	PCTP	1,216	0.98%	0
Revolutionary Socialist Party	PSR	655	0.53%	0
Valid votes		123,755	100.00%	5
Blank votes		560	0.44%	
Rejected votes – other		3,076	2.41%	
Total polled		127,391	85.14%	
Registered electors		149,617		

The following candidates were elected: Alcino Barreto (PSD); Cecília Catarino (PSD); António Vieira Freitas (PSD); Nicolau de Freitas (PSD); and José Maria Silva (PSD).

===== 1976 =====
Results of the 1976 legislative election held on 25 April 1976:

Party		Votes	%	Seats
Democratic People's Party	PPD	60,925	54.63%	4
Socialist Party	PS	28,645	25.68%	1
Social Democratic Centre Party	CDS	15,310	13.73%	1
Portuguese Communist Party	PCP	1,667	1.49%	0
Popular Democratic Union	UDP	1,492	1.34%	0
Christian Democratic Party	PDC	1,412	1.27%	0
Movement of Socialist Left	MES	1,071	0.96%	0
Re-Organized Movement of the Party of the Proletariat	MRPP	553	0.50%	0
People's Monarchist Party	PPM	456	0.41%	0
Valid votes		111,531	100.00%	6
Rejected votes		3,328	2.90%	
Total polled		114,859	79.96%	
Registered electors		143,641		

The following candidates were elected: José Camacho (PPD); Jorge Campinos (PS); José Cabral Fernandes (CDS); Nicolau de Freitas (PPD); Henrique Pontes Leça (PPD); and António Loja (PPD).
