= Nathalie de Oliveira =

French-Portuguese politician (born 1977)

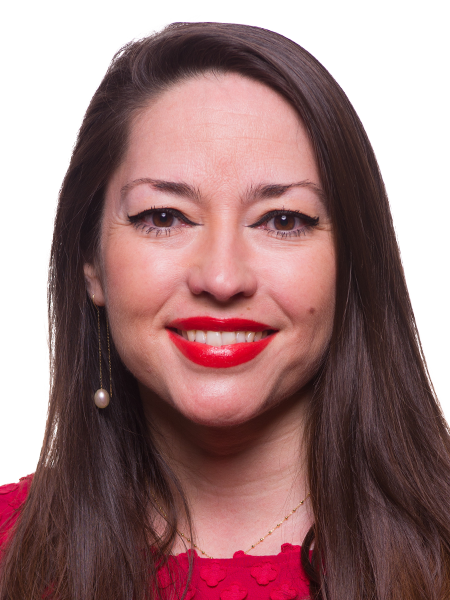
- Official portrait, 2022

Member of the Assembly of the Republic
- In office 28 March 2022 – 26 March 2024
- Constituency: Europe

Deputy Mayor of Metz
- In office 31 March 2014 – 28 June 2020

Municipal Councillor of Metz
- In office 16 March 2008 – 28 June 2020

Personal details
- Born: Nathalie Teixeira de Oliveira (France); Natália Teixeira de Oliveira (Portugal); 16 November 1977 (age 48) Metz, France
- Party: Parti Socialiste (France); Partido Socialista (Portugal)

Nathalie Teixeira de Oliveira (born 16 November 1977) is a French-Portuguese politician. She was a member of the Portuguese Assembly of the Republic from 2022 to 2024, and served as deputy mayor of Metz in France until 2020.

In the 2017 French legislative election, she was a candidate for the National Assembly in Moselle's 3rd constituency. She was a candidate in the 2019 European Parliament election in France, and the 2024 European Parliament election in Portugal. She was born in Metz to Portuguese parents who emigrated to France in the 1960s.

As the first luso-descendant elected to the Portuguese Assembly, Oliveira fought for changes to the electoral law for the Portuguese diaspora and promised to fight for the rights of the Portuguese people living outside of Portugal.

== Electoral history ==
=== Portuguese legislative elections ===
Election	Party	Constituency	List position	Party position	Votes	%	+/-	Status	Notes
2019	PS	Europe	2nd	1st	31,362	29.06%		Not Elected	Automatic voter registration for Portuguese citizens abroad was introduced, increasing the number of voters.
2022	PS	Europe	2nd	1st	36,069	32.98%	▲3.92	Elected	The results of the 2022 legislative election held on 30 January 2022 in the constituency were annulled by the Constitutional Court due ballot papers without copies of voter IDs (which are therefore null and void) being mixed with ballots with voter IDs (which are valid votes) at around 150 polling stations.
2024	PS	Europe	2nd	2nd	38,061	16.22%	▼16.76	Not Elected	For the first time, Chega elected an MP from this constituency.
