= Patrícia Dantas =

Portuguese politician (born 1972)

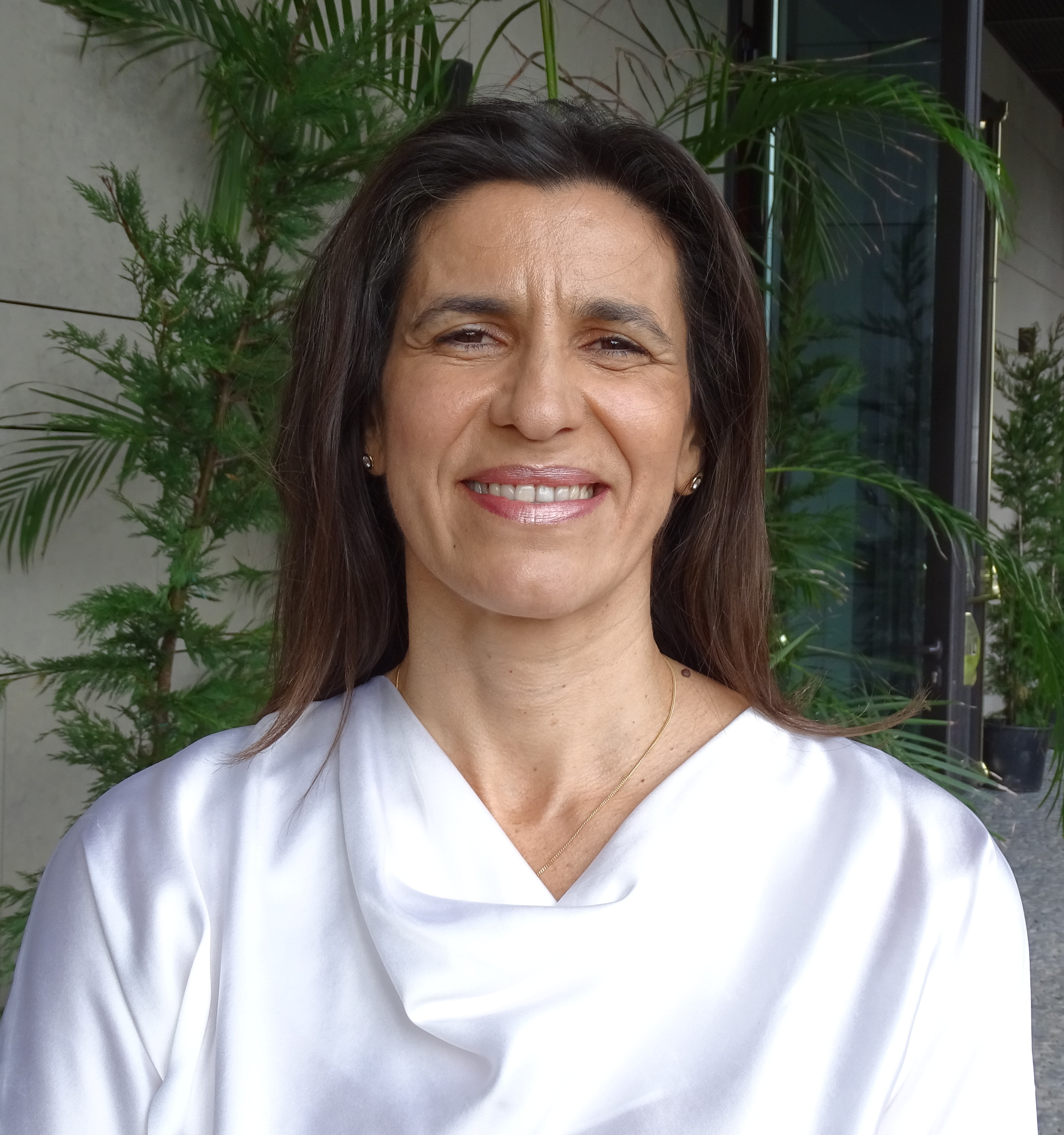

Member of the Assembly of the Republic
- Incumbent
- Assumed office March 2022
- Prime Minister: António Costa

Personal details
- Born: Cláudia Patrícia Homem de Gouveia Dantas; 25 July 1972 (age 54) Mozambique,
- Party: Social Democratic
- Education: NOVA University Lisbon; Catholic University of Portugal; ISCTE – University Institute of Lisbon
- Occupation: Politician
- Profession: Economist

Patrícia Dantas (born July 25, 1972) is a Mozambique-born Portuguese economist and politician. A member of the centre-right Social Democratic Party (PSD), she was elected to the Assembly of the Republic in January 2022, as a representative of the Madeira constituency.

== Early life and education ==
Cláudia Patrícia Homem de Gouveia Dantas, commonly known as Patrícia Dantas, was born in Mozambique in 1972, the daughter of João Heliodoro da Silva Dantas, former mayor of the Madeiran municipalities of Câmara de Lobos and Funchal, and of Elsa Homem de Gouveia Pinto da Silva. At the time of her birth, her father was serving as an army officer in the Public Security Police in what was at the time Portuguese Mozambique, a position he held from 1964 to 1974.

Dantas holds a degree in economics from the School of Business Economics at NOVA University Lisbon, a postgraduate degree in management from the INDEG–ISCTE executive education institute of the ISCTE – University Institute of Lisbon, and a postgraduate degree in finance from the Catholic University of Portugal.

== Career ==
From October 2005 to October 2017, Dantas was executive president of the Business Innovation Centre (BIC) known as Startup Madeira or Centro de Empresa e Inovação Madeira (CEIM). From April 2015 to July 2017, she was president of the General Assembly of BICs in Portugal, known as the Associação dos Centros de Empresa e Inovação. In 2016 she served as a guest lecturer at the University of Madeira to lecture on entrepreneurship, as part of the university's master's degree course on ecotourism.

== Political career ==
In November 2017, Dantas was appointed deputy regional director for economics of the Autonomous Region of Madeira. In January 2020, she was appointed deputy regional director for Parliamentary Affairs, External Relations and Coordination in the Madeiran parliament. In December 2021, she was chosen as a candidate for the coalition between the PSD and the CDS – People's Party to fight the 2022 Portuguese legislative election and was elected to the Assembly of the Republic on 30 January. She was third on the list of candidates for the Madeiran coalition, which won three seats. Nationally, the PSD performed poorly and the Socialist Party of prime minister António Costa secured an overall majority.

In April 2024 it was announced that Joaquim Miranda Sarmento, the new Minister of Finance following the 2024 national election in which the PSD emerged as the largest party, would appoint Dantas as his deputy. However, she withdrew from the post because of outstanding allegations against her concerning fraudulent activities in connection with applications for EU funds.

== Controversy ==
In November 2018, an investigation by a television programme on RTP, alleged that Dantas had been accused by the Central Investigation and Penal Action Department (DCIAP) of fraudulently obtaining a subsidy from the Associação Industrial do Minho when she was president of CEIM, an allegation that she denied. By the time of her election the matter remained unresolved.
