= Rita Madeira =

Portuguese politician (born 1972)

Deputy in the Portuguese Assembly of the Republic
- Incumbent
- Assumed office 2019
- Constituency: Lisbon

Personal details
- Born: Rita Mafalda Nobre Borges Madeira; 8 August 1972 (age 53) Portugal
- Party: Portuguese: Socialist Party (PS)
- Spouse: Joao Manuel Dourado Pinheiro
- Occupation: Politician

Rita Madeira (born 8 August 1972) is a Portuguese politician. As a member of the Portuguese Socialist Party (PS), she has been a deputy in the Portuguese Assembly of the Republic since 2019, representing Lisbon.

== Early life and education ==
Rita Mafalda Nobre Borges Madeira was born on 8 August 1972. She obtained a law degree from the Lusíada University of Lisbon in 2000 and a master's degree in sociology, with studies in labour sciences and labour relations, from the ISCTE – University Institute of Lisbon. She has also taken a postgraduate course in information society law at the University of Lisbon.

== Political career ==
Madeira worked for IBM in Lisbon from 2000 to 2005. She then became a councillor at the municipality of Amadora, in the northwest of the capital, Lisbon, between 2005 and 2017, becoming vice-president of the same municipality in 2017. In the 2019 Portuguese legislative election, she was elected to the Assembly of the Republic on the Socialist Party list for the Lisbon District. In the 2022 Portuguese legislative election she was placed 21st on the list of PS candidates for Lisbon and was elected in last place when the party won 21 seats.

In the parliament, Madeira has represented the PS on the European Affairs and on the Labour and Social Security committees.
