= Patrícia Gilvaz =

Portuguese politician (born 1997)

Ana Patrícia Costa Gilvaz (born on 24 June 1997) is a Portuguese lawyer, politician and a current member of parliament for the party Liberal Initiative (IL). She has a degree in law from the University of Porto where she was president of the students' association at the law school. She was born in Matosinhos Municipality where she had a short stint as a member of the Perafita, Lavra e Santa Cruz do Bispo group at the municipal assembly.
