= Ricardo Vicente =

Portuguese politician

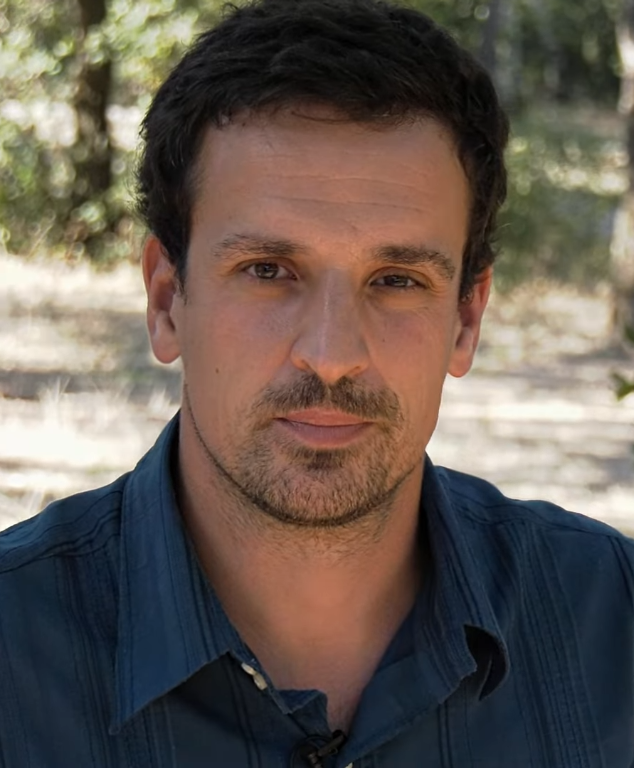
- Ricardo Vicente in 2021

Member of the Assembly of the Republic
- In office 25 October 2019 – 28 March 2022
- Constituency: Leiria

Personal details
- Born: Ricardo Silva Vicente; 30 January 1984 (age 42)
- Party: Left Bloc
- Occupation: Politician

Ricardo Silva Vicente (born 30 January 1984) is a Portuguese politician, who was a member of the Assembly of the Republic, first elected in 2019.
