= Carla Madureira =

Portuguese politician

Member of the Assembly of the Republic
- Incumbent
- Assumed office 2019
- Prime Minister: António Costa
- Constituency: Aveiro

Personal details
- Born: Carla Manuela de Sousa Madureira; 11 January 1974 (age 52) Esmoriz, Aveiro District, Portugal
- Party: Social Democratic
- Spouse: José Ferreira Dias
- Education: University of Trás-os-Montes and Alto Douro
- Profession: Teacher

Carla Madureira (born 1974) is a Portuguese politician. A member of the centre-right Social Democratic Party (PSD), Madureira was first elected to the Assembly of the Republic in the 2019 national election as a representative of the Aveiro constituency.

== Early life and education ==
Carla Manuela de Sousa Madureira was born on 11 January 1974 in Esmoriz in the municipality of Ovar in the Aveiro District of Portugal. She studied education at the University of Trás-os-Montes and Alto Douro (UTAD), located in Vila Real in the north of Portugal. Madureira worked initially as a schoolteacher and is married to José Ferreira Dias.

== Political career ==
Prior to being elected to the National Assembly, Madureira was president of the parish assembly of Esmoriz. Between 2013 and 2017 she was council secretary for the municipality of Ovar and in 2018 and 2019 was councillor for education, social development and health in the same municipality. She was elected to the National Assembly on the PSD list for Aveiro in the 2019 national election and was re-elected in the January 2022 election. In 2022 she was the sixth candidate on the PSD list for Aveiro, with the party winning seven seats.

During her first term in parliament, Madureira served on the committee on education, science, youth and sport and was a member of the working groups on inclusive education and on the rights of people with deficiencies. Her interventions in parliament included raising the problem of coastal erosion being faced by Ovar.
