= Carlos João Pereira =

Portuguese politician (born 1969)

Carlos Pereira

Member of the Assembly of the Republic
- Incumbent
- Assumed office 29 January 2018
- Constituency: Madeira (2018–2024); Lisbon (2024–2025); Setúbal (2025–present)
- In office 23 October 2015 – 1 November 2017
- Constituency: Madeira

Member of the Legislative Assembly of Madeira
- In office 2 November 2017 – 28 January 2018
- In office 6 May 2007 – 22 October 2015

Member of the Funchal City Council
- In office 9 October 2005 – 20 September 2007

Personal details
- Born: Carlos João Pereira; 30 August 1969 (age 57) Funchal, Madeira, Portugal
- Party: Socialist Party (since 2005)
- Education: University of Lisbon; Instituto Superior de Agronomia; University of Madeira
- Occupation: Economist • Professor • Politician

Carlos João Pereira (born 30 August 1969) is a Portuguese politician and economist. He is currently a member of the Portuguese Parliament and vice-president of the Socialist Party's parliamentary group. He was also a member of parliament and parliamentary leader of the PS in the Legislative Assembly of Madeira.

== Biography ==
He has a degree in economics from the Instituto Superior de Economia e Gestão (ISEG). He has two postgraduate degrees, one in Rural Sociology (Instituto Superior de Agronomia) and the other in Tourism Management (Universidade da Madeira).

He was director of Sociedade de Desenvolvimento da Madeira, the company that manages the Madeira Free Trade Zone, secretary-general of the Madeira Chamber of Commerce and Industry, financial director and deputy director of the Madeira Science and Technology Center, visiting professor at the University of Madeira between 1995 and 2008 and founder and first president of the regional branch of the Order of Economists.

In May 2015, he published the book A Herança, a work about how Alberto João Jardim, former president of the Regional Government of Madeira, hid the regional debt of more than 6.3 billion euros.

He is an independent consultant to the European Commission for Horizon 2020, a European Union funding framework program for research and innovation.

Caixa Geral de Depósitos forgave a debt of 66,000 euros owed by Carlos Pereira, who was the rapporteur of a commission of inquiry into the bank.

=== Political career ===
Pereira ran, still without a party affiliation, as the Socialist Party's (PS) front-runner for Funchal City Council in 2005, against Miguel Albuquerque, the Social Democratic Party's incumbent and future president of Madeira's regional government. The PS came second and Pereira was elected as a city councillor, ending his term prematurely in 2007, after a court ruling, for failing to submit his tax return on time.

After the PS's poor result in the regional elections in March 2015, Victor Freitas, then regional president of the party, resigned and Carlos Pereira was the only candidate to succeed him. At the beginning of 2018, he lost the PS's regional leadership to Emanuel Câmara, mayor of Porto Moniz, who promised to take independent Paulo Cafôfo, then mayor of Funchal, as his frontrunner in the 2019 regional elections.

==== Regional Assembly ====
He was elected to the Madeira Regional Legislative Assembly (ALRAM) in the elections of 2007, 2011⁣ – he was the frontrunner that year – and 2015⁣ – in which he was the second candidate. He was president of the PS-Madeira parliamentary group. He suspended his mandate in the regional parliament after being elected to the Assembly of the Republic (AR) in 2015. He returned to the ALRAM between the end of 2017 and the beginning of 2018, this time temporarily suspending his mandate in the AR in order to attend the vote on a motion of censure against Miguel Albuquerque's government.

==== Parliament ====
In October 2015, he was elected to the RA for the Madeira constituency, suspending his mandate as a regional MP. In Parliament, he is one of the vice-presidents of the PS parliamentary group and belongs to the European Affairs, Economy, Innovation and Public Works and Inquiry into the Recapitalization of Caixa Geral de Depósitos and the Management of the Bank committees and is an alternate member of the National Defence Committee.

In April 2018, Pereira was one of the island MPs involved in a controversy over the alleged misuse of public subsidies, as they used two subsidies for the same purpose. These MPs received a travel allowance to their fiscal address (calculated according to the distance between the Parliament and their place of residence), but they also received an allowance granted to all islanders, which covers part of the cost of air travel between the archipelagos and mainland Portugal.

He will once again be the PS candidate for the Madeira constituency in the 2019 legislative elections.
