= Sara Madruga da Costa =

Portuguese politician (born 1978)

Member of the Assembly of the Republic
- Incumbent
- Assumed office 23 October 2015
- Constituency: Madeira

Member of the Legislative Assembly of Madeira
- In office 20 April 2015 – 23 October 2015

Member of the Santo António Parish Assembly
- In office 11 October 2009 – 1 October 2017

Personal details
- Born: Sara Martins Marques dos Santos; 15 September 1978 (age 48) Madeira, Portugal
- Party: Social Democratic Party
- Spouse: Carlos Madruga da Costa
- Education: University of Lisbon, University of Coimbra
- Occupation: Lawyer

Sara Martins Marques dos Santos Madruga da Costa (born 15 September 1978) is a Portuguese lawyer and politician. A member of the Social Democratic Party (PSD), she represents the Autonomous Region of Madeira in the Assembly of the Republic of Portugal.

== Early life ==
Sara Martins Marques dos Santos Madruga da Costa was born in Madeira on 15 September 1978. She graduated in Law from the Faculty of Law of the University of Lisbon and did a postgraduate degree in Law on Spatial Planning, Urbanism and Environment from the Faculty of Law of the University of Coimbra. She is continuing to study at the Lisbon university. She began working as a lawyer in 2003, mainly covering the area of real estate. More recently, she has taught a course at the Instituto Superior de Administração e Línguas (Higher Institute of Administration and Languages - ISAL) in Madeira. She is married to Carlos Eduardo Pereira Madruga da Costa.

== Political career ==
Madruga da Costa's political career began in 2009 when she became a member of the Santo António Parish Assembly in Funchal, capital of Madeira. In early 2015 she became a member of the Regional Legislative Assembly of Madeira, where she played a prominent role in the amendment to the Rules of Procedure of the Assembly. Six months later she was elected on the PSD list of candidates to represent Madeira in the Assembly of the Republic of Portugal. She was re-elected in 2019. She is on several parliamentary committees, including that on constitutional affairs, rights, freedoms and guarantees and is coordinator of a Working Group on the conditions of work of Portugal's security forces. She is a Vice-President of the PSD Parliamentary Group in the Assembly.
