= Cristina Mendes da Silva =

Portuguese politician (born 1966)

Deputy in the Portuguese Assembly of the Republic
- Incumbent
- Assumed office 2019
- Constituency: Porto

Personal details
- Born: Cristina Maria Mendes da Silva; 23 August 1966 (age 59) São Nicolau, Porto, Porto District, Portugal
- Party: Portuguese: Socialist Party (PS)
- Spouse: Divorced
- Occupation: Politician

Cristina Mendes da Silva (born 1966) is a Portuguese politician. As a member of the Portuguese Socialist Party (PS), she has been a deputy in the Portuguese Assembly of the Republic since 2019, representing Porto.

== Early life and education ==
Cristina Maria Mendes da Silva was born on 23 August 1966 in the parish of São Nicolau in Portugal's second city of Porto. Her family came from the parish of Meinedo in the municipality of Lousada, where she still lives. She was trained as a kindergarten teacher in Penafiel and Fafe, specializing in Special Education and Educational Support. Later, she was a PhD student in Human Geography at the Faculty of Arts of the University of Porto.

Silva has worked in Funchal, Madeira, in Lousada, and in Amarante. She has been president of the national Comissões de Proteção de Crianças e Jovens (Committees for the Protection of Children and Young People - CPCJ) and vice-president of the Associação de Desenvolvimento Rural das Terras do Sousa (Sousa Development Association – ADER-SOUSA), an area in northern Portugal.

== Political career ==
Silva served as councillor in Lousada City Council and, from October 2017, was vice-president. As a member of the Socialist Party (PS), Silva was elected as a deputy in the Assembly of the Republic in the 2019 national election, representing Porto. In her first term in the Assembly, she was a member of the parliamentary committees on Labour and Social Security and on European Affairs. In the January 2022 election she was ninth on the PS list of candidates for the Porto District and was easily elected as the PS won 19 seats in Porto and had an overall majority nationally.
