= Mónica Quintela =

Portuguese politician

Member of the Assembly of the Republic
- In office 25 October 2019 – 25 March 2024
- Constituency: Coimbra

Personal details
- Born: Mónica Cláudia de Castro Quintela; 14 July 1967 (age 59) Portugal
- Party: Social Democratic Party
- Spouse: Rui Manuel Portugal da Silva Leal
- Education: University of Coimbra
- Profession: Lawyer

Mónica Quintela (born 1967) is a Portuguese politician. A member of the centre-right Social Democratic Party (PSD), Quintela was first elected to the Assembly of the Republic in 2019 as a representative of the Coimbra constituency.

== Early life and education ==
Mónica Cláudia de Castro Quintela was born on 14 July 1967. She studied law at the University of Coimbra between 1986 and 1991.

== Career ==
Quintela worked as a lawyer from 1994. She married Rui Manuel Portugal da Silva Leal, who is also a lawyer. Between 2014 and 2017 she was a member of the general council of the Portuguese Bar Association.

== Political career ==
In 2019 Quintela was chosen to be head of the list of PSD candidates for the Coimbra constituency in the national election and was elected to be a deputy in the Assembly of the Republic. In the January 2022 national election, called by the Socialist Party prime minister, António Costa, following the failure of left-wing parties to support his budget, Quintela was again first on the PSD list for Coimbra and was duly re-elected. The PSD won three of the available nine seats for Coimbra.

During her first term in the Assembly, Quintela was vice-president of the parliamentary committee on the verification of elected deputies. In her re-election campaign she called for measures to improve birth rates in Portugal, such as improved maternity hospitals and more day-care centres. Criticising the country's bureaucracy, she argued for more rapid digitalization of administrative functions. She also argued for a decentralization of government services.
