= Rosário Gambôa =

Portuguese academic and politician

Deputy in the Portuguese Assembly of the Republic
- Incumbent
- Assumed office 2019
- Constituency: Porto

President of the Polytechnic Institute of Porto (IPP), Portugal
- In office 2010–2018

Personal details
- Born: 3 May 1956 (age 69) Penafiel, Portugal
- Party: Portuguese: Socialist Party (PS)
- Occupation: Academic and politician

Rosário Gambôa (born 1956) is a Portuguese politician. As a member of the Portuguese Socialist Party (PS), she has been a deputy in the Portuguese Assembly of the Republic since 2019, representing Porto. Prior to that, she was president of the Polytechnic Institute of Porto (IPP), a tertiary-level institute with 15,000 students.

== Early life and education ==
Maria do Rosário Gambôa Lopes de Carvalho was born on 3 May 1956 in Penafiel in the Porto District of Portugal. She obtained a degree in philosophy from the University of Porto in 1980, a master's in the philosophy of education from the University of Minho in 1993 and a PhD in philosophy from the University of Minho in 2001.

== Academic career ==
In 2001, Gambôa was appointed as president of the Porto School of Education of IPP. In 2006, she became a vice-president of IPP and in 2010 the institute's president, a position she held until 2018. IPP is Portugal's largest polytechnic. She has also held several advisory positions, including as a director of the Coliseu do Porto, a leading theatrical and concert venue in Porto.

== Political career ==
Gambôa was elected as a deputy in the Assembly of the Republic in the 2019 Portuguese legislative election on the Socialist Party's list for Porto. She was re-elected in the January 2022 election, being placed second on the PS list of candidates for Porto after Alexandre Quintanilha. The Socialist Party won 19 seats in the constituency and an overall majority in the Assembly. From 2019 to 2021 she served on the European Affairs committee and the Culture and Communication committee of the Assembly.

== Publications ==
Gambôa's academic publications (as sole author) include:

- 2019. Territórios da Democracia (Territories of democracy). Lisbon: Caleidoscópio.
- 2018. O Ensino Superior no patamar da era digital (Higher education in the digital age). In: Galegos, Santiago de Compostela, I, No. 24, 2018.
- 2017. A Diversidade como Eixo do Desenvolvimento do Ensino Superior. (Diversity as an Axis of Higher Education Development). Jornal de Letras. Lisboa. 1.
- 2014. A Formação Profissional (Professional training). In: O Papel do Estado no Desenvolvimento.- IV Jornadas AEP Serralves. Porto: Fundação AEP, 2014.
- 2009. Pedagogia de projecto: A perspectiva da Associação Criança (Project Pedagogy: The perspective of Associação Criança). Colecção Infância No. 14. Porto: Porto Editora.
- 2004. Educação, Ética e Democracia: a reconstrução da modernidade em John Dewey (Education, Ethics and Democracy: the reconstruction of modernity in John Dewey). Porto: Edições ASA.
