= Maria da Luz Rosinha =

Portuguese politician

Member of the Assembly of the Republic
- In office 23 October 2015 – 25 March 2024
- Constituency: Lisbon

Mayor of Vila Franca de Xira
- In office January 1998 – October 2013

Member of the Assembly of the Republic
- In office 31 October 1995 – January 1998
- Constituency: Lisbon

Personal details
- Born: Maria da Luz Gameiro Beja; 13 May 1948 (age 78) Vila Franca de Xira, Portugal
- Party: Portuguese: Socialist Party (PS)
- Spouse: Fernando Ferreira Rosinha

Maria da Luz Gameiro Beja Ferreira Rosinha (born 13 May 1948) is a Portuguese politician. As a member of the Socialist Party (PS) she has been a deputy in the Portuguese Assembly of the Republic between 1995 and 1998 and from 2015 to the present. She has also been a member of the national secretariat of the PS and mayor of the municipality of her birthplace, Vila Franca de Xira.

== Early life ==
Maria da Luz Rosinha was born on 13 May 1948 in Vila Franca de Xira, a municipality in the Lisbon District, in Portugal. At the age of 12, she joined the Young Christian Workers (Juventude Operária Católica), of which she would later become a director.

== Political life ==
In 1975, Rosinha joined the Portuguese Socialist Party (PS) and became active in local politics in Vila Franca de Xira. Between 1995 and 1998 she served as a PS deputy in the Assembly of the Republic, representing Lisbon. In January 1998 she became mayor of Vila Franca de Xiro, a position she held until September 2013. After ceasing to be mayor, she held several positions, including on the board of the regional tourist body for Lisbon and the Tagus valley; vice-president of the Lisbon branch of the National Confederation of Family Associations; and president of the council overseeing the development of the Vila Franca de Xira hospital.

In the 2015 Portuguese legislative election Rosinha was again elected to the Assembly of the Republic on the PS list of candidates for Lisbon. She was re-elected in 2019 and, again, in January 2022, when she was 9th on the PS list, with the party winning 21 seats in that constituency and securing an overall majority nationwide. In 2018 she became a member of the national secretariat of the PS, a position she held until 2022. Outside of parliament, she is president of the board of trustees of Fundação CEBI, a social welfare and development organization based in Vila Franca de Xira.

== Awards and honours ==
In 2014 Rosinha was made a Commander of the Order of Merit of Portugal. In 2018, an auditorium at the Pedro Jacques de Magalhães School in Alverca do Ribatejo was named after her.

== Private life ==
Rosinha is married to Fernando Ferreira Rosinha.
