= Sofia Matos =

Portuguese politician

Member of the Assembly of the Republic
- Incumbent
- Assumed office 2019
- Prime Minister: António Costa
- Constituency: Porto

Personal details
- Born: Sofia Helena Correia Fernandes Sousa Matos; 28 September 1990 (age 35) Trofa, Portugal
- Party: Social Democratic Party

Sofia Matos (born 1990) is a Portuguese politician. A member of the centre-right Social Democratic Party (PSD), Matos was elected to the Assembly of the Republic of Portugal in 2019 as a representative of the Porto constituency and re-elected in 2022, when she headed the PSD list for Porto.

== Early life and education ==
Sofia Helena Correia Fernandes Sousa Matos was born on 28 September 1990 in Trofa, a municipality in the north of the Porto metropolitan area in Portugal. Her parents were politically active and she can remember being part of a campaign in 1998 for Trofa to be upgraded to municipal status. She has a degree in law and became a junior partner at the Porto law firm of Bcp Advogados.

== Political career ==
In 2009 Matos met the president of the Social Democratic Youth (JSD) of Trofa and was invited to attend one of its meetings. Rising up through the ranks of the JSD she became a candidate for its national leadership in 2020, losing by 40 votes. In 2013 she became a member of the municipal assembly of Trofa, representing the PSD. In the 2019 national election she was elected to the Assembly of the Republic on the PSD list for Porto. During her first term she served on the Committee on Constitutional Affairs, Rights, Freedoms and Guarantees. In the January 2022 national election she was selected by the then leader of the PSD, Rui Rio, to head the party's list for the Porto constituency. In the election in Porto the PSD increased its vote by 1.2% compared with 2019 but lost one seat because of the improved performance of the Socialist Party of the prime minister António Costa.
