= Sérgio Marques =

Portuguese politician (born 1957)

His Excellency Sérgio Marques
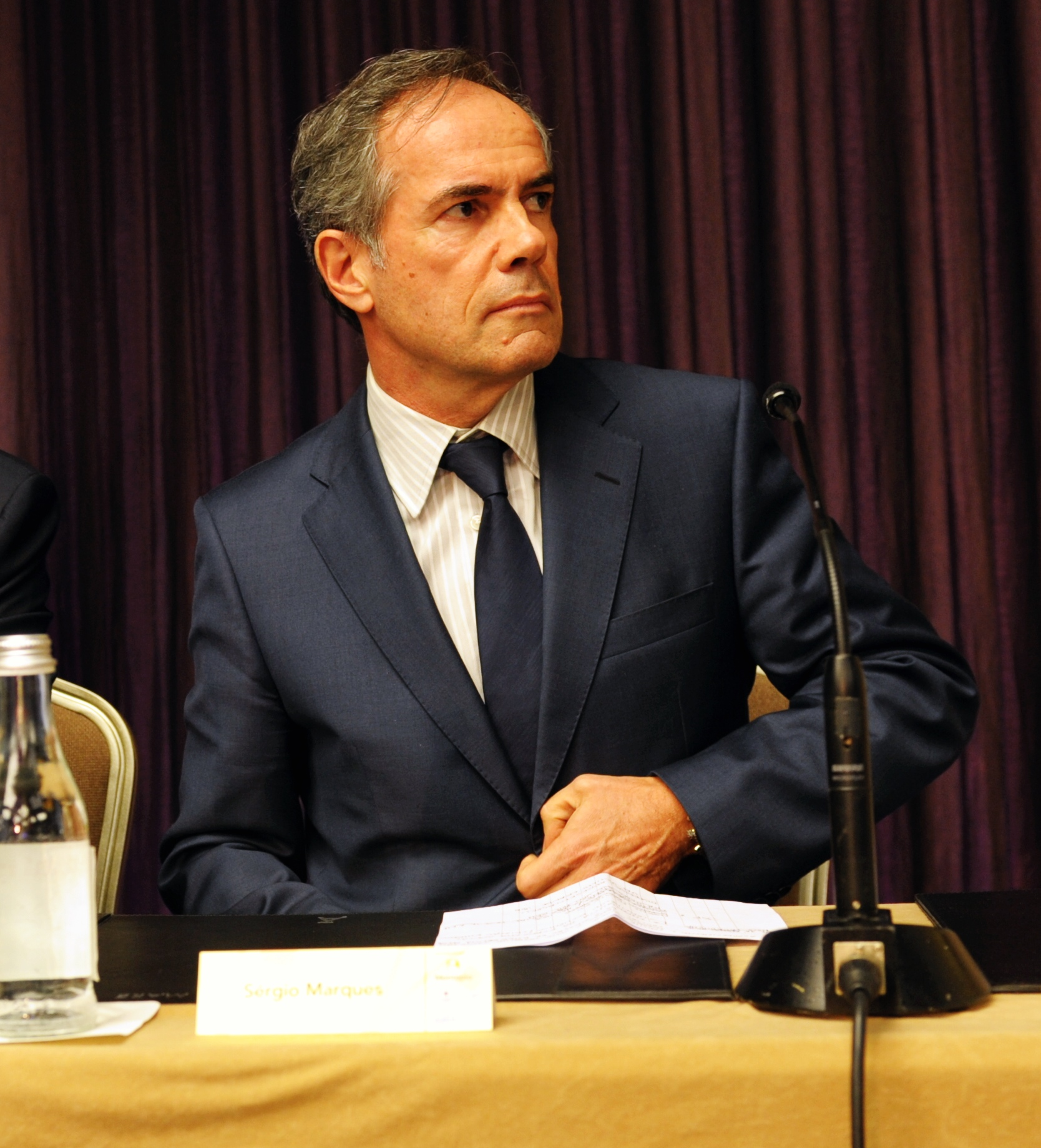

Member of the Assembly of the Republic
- In office 25 October 2019 – 17 January 2023
- Constituency: Madeira

Regional Secretary for Parliamentary and European Affairs
- In office 20 April 2015 – 20 October 2017
- President: Miguel Albuquerque

Member of the European Parliament
- In office 20 July 1999 – 13 July 2009
- Constituency: Portugal

Personal details
- Born: 25 February 1957 (age 69) Funchal, Madeira, Portugal
- Party: Social Democratic Party
- Education: University of Lisbon; University of Coimbra
- Occupation: Politician
- Profession: Lawyer

Mário Sérgio Quaresma Gonçalves Marques (born 25 February 1957) is a Portuguese lawyer and politician, who served as member of the Assembly of the Republic. He was the Regional Secretary of Parliamentary and European Affairs in the Regional Government of Madeira, between 2015 and 2017, in the first regional government led by Miguel Albuquerque. He was also a member of the European Parliament for the PPD/PSD from 1999 to 2009, when he refused to reinstate the lists due to disagreement with the then chairman of the PPD/PSD-Madeira Political Commission and president of the Regional Government of Madeira, Alberto João Jardim.

== Biography ==
=== Early life ===
He graduated in Law from the University of Lisbon in 1980. Later, in 1986, he completed a postgraduate degree in European Studies from the University of Coimbra. He has worked as a lawyer since 1982. He was a civil servant in the staff of the Autonomous Regional Administration of Madeira from 1981 to 1984, Regional Director of planning for the Regional Government of Madeira between 1988 and 1989, where he also managed several companies in the region, related to the shipping sector, harbors and freight operations between 1989 and 1999.

=== Political career ===
His political career includes, among others, the positions of Vice-President of JSD-Madeira (1984–86), PSD-Madeira Party's Youth, Member of the Legislative Assembly of Madeira (1984–1999) and Member of the European Parliament (1999–2009).

In the European Parliament, he was a member of the Group of the European People's Party (Christian Democrat) and European Democrats, of the Committee on Regional Development, alternate member of the Committee on Economic and Monetary Affairs, Vice-President of the Delegation for relations with South Africa, Coordinator of the Informal Group on the Outermost Regions and alternate member of the delegation for relations with the Andean Community.

He announced his candidacy for the presidency of PSD-Madeira on October 30, 2013, having lost. As a motto he proposed a 'Trust Pact' based on the reform of the political system, one of the five pillars of his electoral program. Among its most emblematic proposals are the preferential vote, the referendum to revoke political office, the opening of party elections for supporters and the re-establishment of the maritime connection between Madeira and mainland Portugal.

On April 20, 2015, he was a member of the 12th Regional Government of Madeira, chaired by Miguel Albuquerque, his opponent in the PSD-Madeira caucus serving as Regional Secretary for Parliamentary and European Affairs.

==== Member of the Assembly of the Republic ====
Following the winning of seat in the 2019 Elections, Sérgio Marques assumes office as member of the Portuguese parliament and taking seat in the National Defense, European Affairs and Culture and Communications committees.
