= Pedro do Carmo =

Portuguese politician (born 1971)

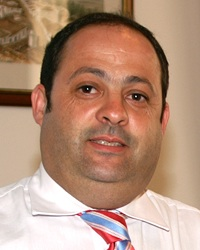

Member of the Assembly of the Republic
- In office 23 October 2015 – 15 January 2024
- Constituency: Beja

Personal details
- Born: 30 April 1971 (age 54)
- Party: Socialist Party

Pedro Nuno Raposo Prazeres do Carmo (born 30 April 1971) is a Portuguese politician. From 2015 to 2024, he was a member of the Assembly of the Republic. From 2005 to 2015, he served as mayor of Ourique.
