= Cláudia André =

Portuguese politician

Member of the Assembly of the Republic
- Incumbent
- Assumed office 2019
- Prime Minister: António Costa
- Constituency: Castelo Branco

Personal details
- Born: Cláudia Sofia Farinha André; 24 May 1971 (age 55) Sertã, Portugal
- Party: Social Democratic Party (PSD)
- Spouse: Victor Manuel Dias Tomás
- Children: One son and one daughter
- Education: University of Coimbra
- Profession: Teacher

Cláudia André (born 1971) is a Portuguese politician. A member of the centre-right Social Democratic Party (PSD), André was elected to the Assembly of the Republic in 2019, as a representative of the Castelo Branco constituency.

== Early life and education ==
Cláudia Sofia Farinha André was born on 24 May 1971 in Sertã in the Castelo Branco District in the east of Portugal. She spent two years studying social security in Lisbon but then left that course and enrolled to study geography at the University of Coimbra, graduating in 1997. André married Victor Manuel Dias Tomás and they have a son and a daughter. She returned to Coimbra University in 2011 to take a one-year course on geographic information systems.

== Career ==
André was a geography teacher for 22 years, serving in many different schools. Being discouraged by what she saw as mistreatment by the ministry of education, she decided to devote herself to politics on a full-time basis.

== Political career ==
André became a member of the Sertã municipal assembly in 2005, serving in that role until 2009 when she became a councillor of that municipality, with responsibility for social action, culture, education and tourism, and forestry. In the 2019 national election she was the only member of the PSD to be elected in the Castelo Branco constituency. She was also the only victorious PSD candidate in the January 2022 election, winning one of the four seats available for Castelo Branco, the others going to the Socialist Party (PS) candidates.
