= Isabel Meirelles =

Portuguese politician

Member of the Assembly of the Republic
- In office 25 October 2019 – 25 March 2024
- Constituency: Lisbon

Personal details
- Born: Isabel Maria Meirelles Teixeira; 4 September 1954 (age 72) Freixo de Espada à Cinta, Portugal
- Party: Social Democratic Party
- Education: University of Lisbon
- Profession: Lawyer

Isabel Meirelles (born 1954) is a Portuguese lawyer and politician. A member of the centre-right Social Democratic Party (PSD), Meireles was elected to the Assembly of the Republic in 2019 and re-elected in 2022, as a representative of the Lisbon constituency.

== Early life and education ==
Isabel Maria Meirelles Teixeira was born on 4 September 1954 in Freixo de Espada à Cinta in the north of Portugal, close to the Spanish border. She obtained a degree in law from the University of Lisbon in 1977. After a legal internship, where she was reluctantly put to work on divorces, she studied at Portugal's National Defence Institute in 1981 and 1982 and then at the Bruges campus of the College of Europe in 1982–83. She obtained a master's degree in international policy and community law from the pt: Universidade Lusíada de Lisboa in 1986.

== Career ==
Meirelles worked as an assistant to the Minister of Justice in 1980 and 1981. She then worked for the Minister for the Autonomous Region of the Azores before returning to various positions with the Ministry of Justice. In 2001 she worked as an advisor to the former Institute of Communications of Portugal. In 2003-04 she chaired the committee overseeing the establishment of the Agência Portuguesa de Segurança Alimentar (Portuguese Food Security Agency – APSA) and was briefly its first president, representing Portugal at meetings of the European Food Safety Authority.

In 2006-07 Meirelles lectured at the European Institute for Public Administration (EIPA) in Luxembourg, returning to Portugal to work again with the Ministry of Justice, advising its European Law Office. More recently, she has worked in a law firm that she set up together with her ex-husband, Luís Vasconcelos Salgado. She has lectured at the Universidade Autónoma de Lisboa, at the ISCTE – University Institute of Lisbon, at the Universidade Lusófona, and at the School of Social Communication of the Polytechnic Institute of Lisbon. Meirelles is also known for her regular media appearances to discuss European issues.

== Political career ==
=== Career in local politics ===
Meirelles’ first political role was as a councillor in the Oeiras municipality, to the west of the capital, Lisbon. In 2018 she was elected as vice-president of the Social Democratic Party (PSD).

=== Member of Parliament, 2019–2024 ===
In the 2019 elections, Meirelles was elected as a deputy to the Assembly of the Republic on the PSD's list for Lisbon, serving on the Committee for European Affairs and on the Committee for Labour, Social Security and Inclusion. She was re-elected in the 2022 elections, being third on the PSD list for Lisbon, with the party winning 13 seats in that constituency.

In addition to her committee assignments, Mereilles has been a member of the Portuguese delegation to the Parliamentary Assembly of the Council of Europe (PACE) since 2020. In the Assembly, she has served on the Committee on Political Affairs and Democracy (since 2020) and the Sub-Committee on External Relations (2021–2022).
