= Olga Silvestre =

Portuguese politician

Member of the Assembly of the Republic
- Incumbent
- Assumed office 2019
- Prime Minister: António Costa
- Constituency: Leiria

Personal details
- Born: Olga Cristina Fino Silvestre; 19 September 1964 (age 61) Porto de Mós, Leiria District, Portugal
- Party: Social Democratic Party
- Spouse: Luis Augusto Sousa Menau
- Education: Degree in law
- Profession: Lawyer

Olga Silvestre (born 1964) is a Portuguese politician. A member of the centre-right Social Democratic Party (PSD), Silvestre was first elected to the Assembly of the Republic in 2019 as a representative of the Leiria constituency. She was re-elected in 2022.

== Early life ==
Olga Cristina Fino Silvestre was born on 19 September 1964 in the parish of Pedreiras in the municipality of Porto de Mós, in the Leiria District in the centre of Portugal. She obtained a degree in law. Silvestre married Luis Augusto Sousa Menau.

== Career ==
Silvestre started practising as a lawyer in 1989. Her law firm is based in Alcobaça, also in the Leiria District. She has been one of the driving forces behind the establishment of the Rotary Club of Porto de Mós and of the Senior University of Porto de Mós.

== Political career ==
Silvestre became secretary of the Porto de Mós municipal assembly in 2017. Among her other roles, she has been a member of the assembly of the inter-municipal community of Pinhal Litoral, a former region of Portugal, president of the political commission of the PSD in Porto de Mós, and the social democratic party women’s coordinator for the Leiria District.

In the 2019 national election Silvestre was fourth on the list of PSD candidates for Leiria and was elected when the PSD won five of the ten seats allocated to the constituency. In the January 2022 election, called by the Socialist prime minister, António Costa, after his left-wing coalition partners refused to support the budget, Silvestre was third on the PSD list and was re-elected when PSD won four of the ten seats.
