= Maria Antónia Almeida Santos =

Portuguese politician

Deputy in the Portuguese Assembly of the Republic
- In office 2005–2024
- Constituency: 2005–2011 Coimbra; 2011–2015 Lisbon; 2015–2019 Guarda; 2019–2024 Setúbal

Personal details
- Born: Maria Antónia Areias de Almeida Santos; 14 February 1962 (age 64) Portuguese Mozambique
- Party: Portuguese: Socialist Party (PS)
- Spouse: Divorced
- Occupation: Politician

Maria Antónia Moreno Areias de Almeida Santos (born 1962) is a Portuguese politician. As a member of the Portuguese Socialist Party (PS), she was briefly a deputy in the Portuguese Assembly of the Republic during the 8th legislature. She returned to the Assembly in 2005 and has been re-elected in every national election since then, including the most recent in January 2022. She has served as chair of the Assembly's Health Committee.

== Early life and education ==
Maria Antónia Moreno Areias de Almeida Santos was born on 14 February 1962 in Mozambique, where her parents were stationed. They had both studied law in Portugal and moved to what was then Portuguese Mozambique after marriage, where they had four daughters and a son. Her father was António de Almeida Santos, who became a leading figure in the Portuguese Socialist Party and was a former president of the Assembly of the Republic. The family returned to Portugal when she was 11 years old. Santos graduated in law.

== Career ==
In April 1986, when Mário Soares became president, she was asked to act as legal advisor to the President of the Republic. She worked directly with Maria Barroso, the wife of Soares, and the role gave her the opportunity to meet many other political personalities of the time. She stayed in this role until October 1995, working with a Lisbon law firm at the same time. From October 1995 to June 2001 she worked as a legal advisor in the office of the President of the Assembly of the Republic, when her father was in this position. From June 2001 to January 2005, she served as President of the Commission for the Avoidance of Drug Addiction in Lisbon, publishing two papers on drug addiction. In this role, she managed to get the use of cannabis for therapeutic purposes approved.

== Political career ==
Almeida Santos came relatively late to formal involvement in politics, not joining Socialist Youth, the youth arm of the PS, until she was 24. She served briefly as a deputy during the 8th legislature (1999–2002) and was then elected as deputy to the Assembly for the 10th legislature in 2005, as a representative of the Socialist Party. Until the 2011 election she represented Coimbra, moving to represent Lisbon in that year. From 2015 to 2019 she represented Guarda before transferring to Setúbal for the 2019 Portuguese legislative election. In the January 2022 election, Almeida Santos was sixth on the PS list for Setúbal, with the party winning ten seats in the constituency and an overall majority nationwide.

In the Assembly, Almeida Santos became chair of the Health Committee, which, under her tenure, has investigated issues such as euthanasia, abortion, and emergency contraception. She is a member of the national secretariat of the Socialist Party.

== Publications ==
- 2004. Contributions to an analysis of the experience of decriminalizing drug use. Revista Toxicodependências, Volume 10, No. 1.
- 2003. Decriminalization of the Consumption of Narcotic Substances – Interpretation and application of Law 30 /2000 of 29 November. Revista do Ministério Público.
