= Sónia Ramos =

Portuguese politician and jurist

Member of the Assembly of the Republic
- In office 29 March 2022 – 18 May 2025
- Constituency: Évora

Member of the Estremoz City Council
- Incumbent
- Assumed office 18 October 2021

President of the Social Democratic Party of Évora
- In office 11 November 2016 – 26 November 2022
- Preceded by: António Costa da Silva
- Succeeded by: Francisco Figueira

Personal details
- Born: Sónia Cristina Silva dos Ramos; 28 February 1973 (age 53) Évora, Portugal
- Party: Social Democratic Party
- Education: University of Lisbon
- Occupation: Jurist • Politician

Sónia Cristina Silva dos Ramos (born 28 February 1973) is a Portuguese jurist, member of the Assembly of the Republic and politician. She was a member of the Assembly of the Republic in the XV legislature for the Social Democratic Party, elected by Évora, and was re-elected in the 2024 national election.

She has been a member of the Estremoz City Council since 2021 and was the President of the Social Democratic Party of the Évora District between 2016 and 2022.

In March 2024, she was re-elected as the first candidate, on the Democratic Alliance's Évora list for the 2024 legislative elections.
