= Maria Gabriela Fonseca =

Portuguese politician

Member of the Assembly of the Republic
- In office 25 October 2019 – 25 March 2024
- Constituency: Braga

Personal details
- Born: Maria Gabriela da Cunha Baptista Rodrigues; 5 June 1958 (age 68) Portugal
- Party: Social Democratic
- Spouse: António Benjamim Saraiva da Fonseca
- Education: University of Minho
- Profession: Teacher

Maria Gabriela Fonseca (born 1958) is a Portuguese politician. A member of the centre-right Social Democratic Party (PSD), Fonseca was elected to the Assembly of the Republic of Portugal in 2019 and re-elected in 2022, as a representative of the Braga constituency.

== Early life and education ==
Maria Gabriela da Cunha Baptista Rodrigues da Fonseca was born on 5 June 1958. She obtained a degree in education from the University of Minho. She married António Benjamim Saraiva da Fonseca.

== Career ==
Fonseca worked as a teacher. From 2005 until her election to the National Assembly she was also a member of the board of governors of the Vocational Education School of Alto Ave (EPAVE). She also served as a member of the board of directors of the Sindicato dos Professores da Zona Norte (SPZN), the teachers’ union for the north of the country.

== Political career ==
Between 2005 and 2019 Fonseca was vice president of the municipality of Póvoa de Lanhoso in the Braga District. In the 2019 national election she was elected to the Assembly of the Republic on the PSD list for the Braga constituency. She was re-elected in the January 2022 election, being sixth on the PSD list for Braga, with the party winning eight seats in that constituency.
