= Cláudia Bento =

Portuguese politician

Member of the Assembly of the Republic
- Incumbent
- Assumed office 2019
- Prime Minister: António Costa
- Constituency: Vila Real

Personal details
- Born: Cláudia Patrícia Quitério Bento; 4 June 1983 (age 43) Chaves, Portugal
- Party: Social Democratic Party
- Spouse: Bruno Miguel Batista Lopes
- Education: University of Minho
- Profession: Doctor

Cláudia Bento (born 4 June 1983) is a Portuguese politician. A member of the centre-right Social Democratic Party (PSD), Bento was first elected to the Assembly of the Republic in 2019 as a representative of the Vila Real constituency and re-elected in 2022.

== Early life and education ==
Cláudia Patrícia Quitério Bento was born on 4 June 1983 in Chaves, Portugal. Her parents were teachers who were posted in several different locations in Portugal, including Serra de Água in Madeira and in Setúbal, before returning to their home in Chaves in the north of the country. She trained in cardiopneumology at the School of Health at the Polytechnic Institute of Porto before gaining admission to the University of Minho to study medicine, obtaining an integrated masters in medicine in 2008.

== Career ==
In 2010 Bento became an intern at the Centro Hospitalar de Trás-os-Montes e Alto Douro (CHTMAD), in Vila Real, working in internal medicine and specialising in nephrology. She qualified as a doctor after five years and has worked at the same hospital since then, while also working at other clinics in the region.

== Political career ==
In around 2016 a friend suggested that Bento should be a candidate to be on the municipal assembly of Chaves and she has been on that assembly since 2017. In the 2019 national election she was elected to the Assembly of the Republic as a PSD candidate for the Vila Real constituency and was re-elected in the 2022 election when the prime minister, António Costa, called an early poll following the failure of left-wing parties to support his budget. She was second on the PSD list, with the party winning two of the five seats available for that constituency. During her first term in the National Assembly, Bento was a member of the parliamentary committee on health and retained that role after the 2022 election. Bento has made several critical interventions in the parliament regarding medical provision in Portugal, particularly in relation to her constituency.

== Personal life ==
Bento is married to Bruno Miguel Batista Lopes.
