= Lina Lopes =

Portuguese politician

Member of the Assembly of the Republic
- In office 25 October 2019 – 25 March 2024
- Constituency: Lisbon

Personal details
- Born: Lina Maria Cardoso Lopes; 28 May 1961 (age 65) Setúbal, Portugal
- Party: Chega (2025–present)
- Other political affiliations: Social Democratic Party (until 2025)
- Spouse: Manuel José Simóes Loureiro
- Education: University of Lisbon

Lina Maria Cardoso Lopes (born 28 May 1961) is a Portuguese politician. A former member of the centre-right Social Democratic Party (PSD), Lopes was first elected to the Assembly of the Republic in 2019 as a representative of the Lisbon constituency.

She will be the Chega's candidate to the Mayorship of Setúbal in the local elections of 2025.

== Early life and education ==
Lina Maria Cardoso Lopes was born in Setúbal, Portugal on 28 May 1961. Her father was a businessman who had been held at gunpoint following Portugal's Carnation Revolution in 1974, when the Estado Novo dictatorship had been overthrown. She has said that witnessing that conditioned her subsequent political views.

Lopes obtained a degree in chemistry at the science faculty of the University of Lisbon in 1988. Later studies included a postgraduate course in public health at the Universidade Lusófona, a master's in food engineering in 2002 from the Instituto Superior Técnico of Lisbon and a diploma in information systems from the Complutense University of Madrid.

== Career ==
Lopes became a teacher, first at schools and later at the faculty of engineering at the Universidade Lusófona. She joined the Sindicato Nacional e Democrático dos Professores (SINDEP), a teachers' union, and became its deputy secretary-general. SINDEP is affiliated to the General Union of Workers (UGT) and Lopes became a member of the UGT executive and president of its women's committee. She was also appointed as a member of the Comissão para a Igualdade no Trabalho e no Emprego (Committee for Equality in Work and Employment), a body consisting of government ministries and trade unions. She also served on the women's committee of the European Trade Union Confederation.

== Political career ==
Lopes was elected to the Assembly of the Republic as a member of the Social Democratic Party (PSD) for the Lisbon constituency in the 2019 national election. In February 2021 she was appointed as the representative to the Assembly of the international organization, Women Political Leaders (WPL). WPL is a non-profit organization whose mission is to promote the participation and influence of women in positions of political leadership.

In her first term of office as a parliamentarian, Lopes sat on the national defence committee of the Assembly. She was re-elected in the January 2022 national election, being sixth on the list of 13 PSD members to be elected for the Lisbon constituency. However, for the 2024 national election, in which the PSD formed a coalition with two smaller parties to form the Democratic Alliance (AD) coalition, she was only included on the AD list for Lisbon in last place, and was not elected.

After the election, in which the right-wing CHEGA party performed better than in previous elections, she was appointed to the office of the CHEGA vice-president of Parliament, Diogo Pacheco de Amorim.
