= Romualda Fernandes =

Portuguese jurist and politician, originally from Guinea-Bissau

Member of the Assembly of the Republic
- In office 25 October 2019 – 25 March 2024
- Constituency: Lisbon

Personal details
- Born: Romualda Maria da Conceição Martins Nunes Fernandes; 10 September 1954 (age 72) Portuguese Guinea
- Party: Socialist Party
- Education: University of Paris 8 Vincennes-Saint-Denis
- Occupation: Jurist • Politician

Romualda Maria da Conceição Martins Nunes Fernandes (born 10 September 1954) is a Portuguese jurist and politician, originally from Guinea-Bissau. She was first elected to the Assembly of the Republic as a representative of the Portuguese Socialist Party (PS) in 2019.

== Early life and training ==
Romualda Maria da Conceição Martins Nunes Fernandes was born on 10 September 1954 in the former Portuguese colony of Guinea-Bissau. She arrived in Portugal at the age of 13. She obtained a degree in Legal Sciences from the University of Paris 8 Vincennes-Saint-Denis in France followed in 1980 by a postgraduate course in International Law at the Institute of Higher International Studies at the Panthéon-Assas University in Paris. She then took a course to enter the Portuguese judiciary at the Judicial Studies Center in Lisbon. In 1984 she began working as an intern judge in the Civil Courts at the Lisbon Palace of Justice, under the guidance of Judge Fernando Pinto Monteiro. Fernandes also has a PhD in Public Policies from ISCTE – University Institute of Lisbon, obtained in 2014.

== Legal work ==
Fernandes specialises in international law applied to the condition of foreigners, together with humanitarian law. After working in Guinea-Bissau, including in the Attorney-General's office, she returned to Portugal where she worked as an advisor to several government departments and a consultant to the International Organization for Migration. She has also been a member of the Board of Directors of the Portuguese High Commission for Migration and was an advisor to the First Secretary of the Lisbon Municipal Assembly from 2013 to 2017.

== Political life ==
As a member of the Socialist Party (PS), Fernandes was elected as a deputy to the Assembly of the Republic in 2019, occupying the 19th place on the PS list of candidates for Lisbon. She was one of three women of African and Guinea-Bissau origins who was elected to the Assembly in that year, the others being Joacine Katar Moreira and Beatriz Gomes Dias. In May 2021 she was the victim of racist coverage in Portuguese newspapers, which reproduced copy supplied by the Lusa News Agency in which her name appeared with the word "Preta" (Black) appearing after it in brackets. The agency hastily apologised and the person responsible resigned. Fernandes was re-elected in the January 2022 elections.
