= Márcia Passos =

Portuguese politician

Member of the Assembly of the Republic
- Incumbent
- Assumed office 2015
- Prime Minister: António Costa
- Constituency: Porto

Personal details
- Born: Márcia Isabel Duarte Passos; 24 July 1969 (age 57) Portugal
- Party: Social Democratic Party
- Spouse: Abílio Manuel Teixeira Resende
- Education: Catholic University of Portugal
- Profession: Lawyer

Márcia Passos (born 1969) is a Portuguese politician. A member of the centre-right Social Democratic Party (PSD), Passos was first elected to the Assembly of the Republic in 2019 as a representative of the Porto constituency.

== Early life and education ==
Márcia Isabel Duarte Passos Resende was born on 24 July 1969. Having wanted to be a lawyer from an early age, she obtained a degree in law from the Catholic University of Portugal and a master's degree in civil procedural law from the same university. In 2020 she began studying for a doctorate in law at the Portuguese Catholic University of Porto. She lives in Maia in the Porto District of Portugal, and is married to Abílio Manuel Teixeira Resende.

== Career ==
Passos has been a lawyer since 1995, working for private law companies in the area of civil law and commercial law, with an emphasis on real estate law. She is a member of the Porto Regional Council of the Portuguese Bar Association. She is a part-time professor at the European Business School of ISAG, the Instituto Superior de Administração e Gestão in Porto and has also carried out training at several other institutions, including the Polytechnic Institute of Porto. She is a co-author of the Portuguese Code of Civil Procedure.

== Political career ==
As an independent, with support from the PSD, Passos was president of the Vila Nova da Telha Parish Assembly for 12 years and, subsequently, was also a deputy to the municipal assembly of Maia. In the 2019 national election she was elected to the Assembly of the Republic on the PSD list for Porto. In the 2022 election she was re-elected, being seventh on the list of PSD candidates for Porto, with the PSD winning 14 seats in that constituency. During her first term of office, Passos served on the Assembly's Committee on Economy, Public Works, Planning and Housing.
