= Alma Rivera =

Portuguese communist politician

Member of the Assembly of the Republic of Portugal
- Incumbent
- Assumed office 2019
- Parliamentary group: Unitary Democratic Coalition (CDU)
- Constituency: Lisbon

Personal details
- Born: Alma Benedetti Croce Rivera; 24 September 1991 (age 35) Azores, Portugal
- Party: Portuguese: Portuguese Communist Party (PCP)
- Education: University of Coimbra
- Occupation: Jurist

Alma Rivera (born 1991) is a Portuguese politician. A member of the Portuguese Communist Party (PCP), she has been a deputy to the Assembly of the Republic of Portugal since 2019, representing the Lisbon constituency.

== Early life ==
Alma Benedetti Croce Rivera was born in the Portuguese Autonomous Region of the Azores Azores on 24 September 1991, the daughter of an Italian father and mother. She lived in the Azores until the age of 18, when she went to the University of Coimbra, where she was involved in student demonstrations and from where she graduated in law.

== Political activity ==
Rivera joined the PCP in 2010 while at university, although she remembers being called a communist while at high school in the Azores. She became a member of the Portuguese Communist Youth and was on its secretariat. In the 2015 national elections she was on the list of candidates of the Unitary Democratic Coalition (CDU), a group consisting of the PCP, the Greens, and the Democratic Intervention, but was not elected, being sixth on the PCP list for Lisbon. She also stood in the European Parliament elections of 2019, again without success. She was elected to the Assembly of the Republic as a PCP candidate for the Lisbon constituency in the 2019 Portuguese legislative election, having been second on the CDU list. In the election campaign she had argued for improved employment contracts for young people and for improved housing and transport for the Lisbon District. She was re-elected in the January 2022 election, when she was again second on the CDU list for Lisbon. In that election the PCP and other left-wing parties performed poorly and the incumbent Socialist Party prime minister, António Costa, won an overall majority.

Rivera is a member of the PCP's central committee. In her first term as a deputy in the National Assembly she served on the parliamentary committee on Constitutional Affairs, Rights and Freedoms, on the Culture, Communication, Youth and Sport committee, and on the committee on Transparency. She contributed to working groups on topics such as monitoring asbestos removal from public buildings and on night-time flights.
