= Susana Amador =

Portuguese politician

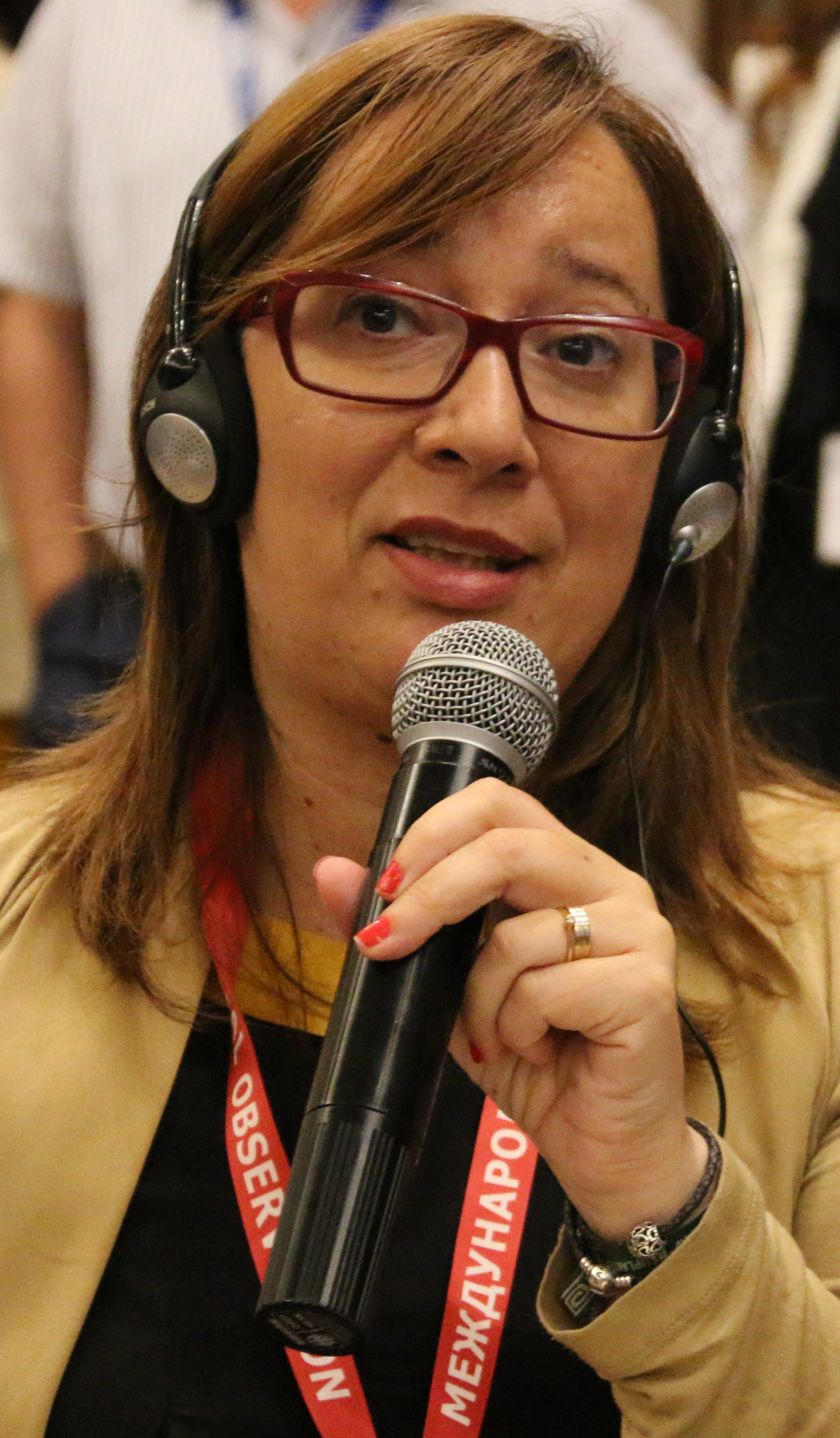

Member of the Assembly of the Republic
- Incumbent
- Assumed office 2015
- Constituency: Lisbon

Secretary of State for Education
- In office 2019–2019

Mayor of Odivelas, 2005-2015
- In office 2005–2015

Personal details
- Born: Susana de Fátima Carvalho Amador; 25 April 1967 (age 59) Portalegre, Portugal
- Party: Portuguese: Socialist Party (PS)
- Spouse: Carlos Alberto Fernandes Pinto
- Education: University of Lisbon; NOVA University Lisbon
- Occupation: Politician

Susana Amador (born 1967) is a Portuguese jurist and politician. As a member of the Portuguese Socialist Party (PS), she briefly became a deputy in the Portuguese Assembly of the Republic in 2005. She was elected to the Assembly again in 2015 and re-elected in 2019 and 2022. Between 2005 and 2015 she was a member of the Lisbon Metropolitan Council and mayor of Odivelas, a municipality in the Lisbon area. In 2019 she served as the Secretary of State for Education.

== Early life and education ==
Susana de Fátima Carvalho Amador was born in the parish of Alagoa in the municipality of Portalegre in the east of Portugal on 25 April 1967. She studied for an undergraduate degree at the Faculty of Law of the University of Lisbon and then obtained a master's in law and communication services from the Faculty of Social and Human Sciences of NOVA University Lisbon. Amador also studied at the Refugee Studies Centre at Oxford University in England and did postgraduate studies in European Studies at the Catholic University of Portugal.

== Career ==
Between 1991 and 1993 Amador worked as a legal adviser to the United Nations High Commissioner for Refugees (UNHCR). From 1993 to 1995 she coordinated the legal office of the Portuguese Council for Refugees. In 1995 she became the legal advisor to the parliamentary group of the Portuguese Socialist Party (PS), retaining that post until 2005.

== Political career ==
Amador was president of the Municipal Assembly of Odivelas between 2001 and 2005. In the 2005 national election she was elected as a deputy to the National Assembly but left that position at the end of 2005 when she became the mayor of Odivelas and a member of the Lisbon Metropolitan Council, positions she held until 2015. Between 2013 and 2015 she was president of the Inter-Municipal Development Cooperation Network and a vice-president of the National Association of Portuguese Municipalities. In the 2005 national election, she was elected as a deputy in the National Assembly as a PS candidate in the Lisbon. Re-elected in 2019, she was appointed as the Secretary of State for Education, a position she held for one year, before returning to the Assembly. In October 2021, she was elected president of the municipal assembly of Loures in the Lisbon District. In the 2022 national election Amador was 12th on the PS list for the Lisbon District constituency, for which the PS won 21 of the available seats. The election resulted in the PS, under the prime minister António Costa, winning an overall majority in the country and being able to form a government without a coalition.

During her time in the National Assembly, Amador has sat on the Committee on Health, and on the committee to monitor the implementation of measures to respond to the COVID-19 pandemic. Between 2015 and 2019 she was a vice-president of the PS parliamentary group. She is a regular contributor of newspaper columns, particularly in the Observador.
