= Marta Freitas (politician) =

Portuguese politician (born 1980)

Member of the Assembly of the Republic of Portugal
- In office 2019–2024
- Constituency: Madeira

Personal details
- Born: Marta Luísa de Freitas; 27 September 1980 (age 45) Portugal
- Party: Portuguese: Socialist Party (PS)
- Occupation: Politician

Marta Freitas (born September 27, 1980) is a member of the Assembly of the Republic of Portugal, being first elected in October 2019 as a representative of the Portuguese Socialist Party (PS) for the constituency of Madeira.

== Education ==
Marta Luísa de Freitas was born on 27 September 1980. She has an undergraduate degree in physiotherapy and a master's in Physical Activity and Sport. She works as a physiotherapist at a retirement home and privately in Madeira.

== Political career ==
In 2017, Freitas became a member of the Municipal Assembly in Funchal, capital of Portugal's Autonomous Region of Madeira. She was elected as a deputy of the National Assembly of Portugal in 2019. As a deputy, she is a member of the parliamentary commission on Labour and Social Security and the Working Group on the Rights of People with Disabilities. Freitas was re-elected for the Madeira constituency in the 2022 Portuguese legislative election on 30 January 2022, but was not a candidate in the 2024 election.

In January 2024 she was elected as the secretary-general of the PS in Madeira. At the same time she was elected as the president of the political commission of socialist women in the constituency.
