= Party lists for the 2025 Portuguese legislative election =

Members of Parliament in the 2025 Portuguese legislative election will be elected in a closed list proportional representation system. Each constituency in Portugal elects a certain number of MPs depending on their number of registered voters. This number ranges from a minimum of 2 MPs in Portalegre to 48 in Lisbon. In this page, the names of the head candidates by party and/or coalition for each constituency will be listed. The leader of each party/coalition is displayed in bold.

== Heads of party lists ==
=== Parties represented in Parliament ===
All parties represented in Parliament except PAN will run in all constituencies. PAN will not run in Viseu.

Constituency	AD	PS	CH	IL	BE	CDU	L	PAN
Aveiro	**Luís Montenegro**	**Pedro Nuno Santos**	Pedro Frazão	Mário Amorim Lopes	Luís Fazenda	Isabel Tavares	Filipe Honório	Ana Gonçalves
Beja	Gonçalo Valente	Pedro do Carmo	Rui Cristina	Generosa Brito	Alberto Matos	Bernardino Soares	Fausto Camacho Fialho	Luís Coentro
Braga	Hugo Soares	José Luís Carneiro	Filipe Melo	**Rui Rocha**	Francisco Louçã	Sandra Cardoso	Jorge Oliveira Araújo	Tiago Teixeira
Bragança	Hernâni Dias	Júlia Rodrigues	José Mário Mesquita	Nuno Monteiro Fernandes	Vítor Pimenta	Fátima Bento	Anabela Correia	Octávio Pires
Castelo Branco	Pedro Reis	Nuno Fazenda	João Ribeiro	Manuel Lemos	Inês Antunes	Vítor Reis Silva	Joana Alves Pereira	Paul Summers
Coimbra	Rita Júdice	Pedro Delgado Alves	Paulo Seco	Catarina Graveto	Miguel Cardina	Fernando Teixeira	André Chichorro Carvalho	João Fontes da Costa
Évora	Francisco Figueira	Luís Dias	Jorge Valsassina Galveias	Rodrigo Mendonça	Pedro Ferreira	Graça Nascimento	Glória Franco	Sérgio Neves
Faro	Maria Graça Carvalho	Jamila Madeira	Pedro Pinto	Daniel Viegas	José Gusmão	Catarina Marques	Carla Carmo	Saúl Rosa
Guarda	Dulcineia Moura	Aida Carvalho	Nuno Simões de Melo	Rui Abreu	Beatriz Realinho	Catarina Costa	Margarida Bordalo	João Almeida
Leiria	Margarida Balseiro Lopes	Eurico Brilhante Dias	Gabriel Mithá Ribeiro	André Abrantes Amaral	Fernando Rosas	João Paulo Delgado	Inês Pires	Rodrigo Andrade
Lisbon	Joaquim Miranda Sarmento	Mariana Vieira da Silva	**André Ventura**	Mariana Leitão	**Mariana Mortágua**	**Paulo Raimundo**	**Rui Tavares**	**Inês Sousa Real**
Portalegre	Manuel Castro Almeida	Luís Moreira Testa	João Aleixo	Francisco Biscaya Cardoso	José Carita Monteiro	Helena Neves	João Ramos	Telma Espírito Santo
Porto	Paulo Rangel (Note: Nuno Melo, the leader of CDS–PP, is the second candidate of the list.)	Fernando Araújo	Rui Afonso	Carlos Guimarães Pinto	Marisa Matias	Alfredo Maia	Jorge Pinto	Alexandre Trindade
Santarém	Fernando Alexandre	Marcos Perestrello	Pedro Correia	Afonso Neves	Bruno Góis	Inês Santos	Natércia Lopes	Vera Matos
Setúbal	Teresa Morais	António Mendonça Mendes	Rita Matias	Joana Cordeiro	Joana Mortágua	Paula Santos	Paulo Muacho	Mariana Crespo
Viana do Castelo	José Pedro Aguiar-Branco	Marina Gonçalves	Eduardo Teixeira	Hugo Joel Pereira	Adriana Temporão	Joaquim Celestino Ribeiro	João Puig	Isabel Rhodes
Vila Real	Ana Paula Martins	Rui Santos	Manuela Tender	Joana Ferreira	Anabela Oliveira	José Luís Ferreira	Luís Ramalho	Rui Almeida
Viseu	António Leitão Amaro	Elza Pais	João Tilly	João Antas de Barros	David Santos	Alexandre Hoffman Castela	Miguel Won	—N/a
Azores	Paulo Moniz	Francisco César	Francisco Meneses de Lima	Hugo Almeida	Pedro Amaral	António Almeida	Ricardo Ribeiro	Dinarte Pimentel
Madeira	Pedro Coelho	Emanuel Câmara	Francisco Gomes	João Corte Fernandes	Diogo Teixeira	Herlanda Amado	Marta Sofia	Válter Ramos
Europe	José Manuel Fernandes	Emília Ribeiro	José Dias Fernandes	Ana Moura	Teresa Duarte Soares	Joana Carvalho	Mafalda Dâmaso	Paulo Vieira de Castro
Outside Europe	José Cesário	Vítor Silva	Manuel Magno	Christian Höhn	Ana Isabel Silva	Ana Oliveira	Manuel Brito-Semedo	Nelson Abreu
Sources								

=== Parties not represented in Parliament ===
Out of the parties not represented in Parliament, only ADN, RIR, Rise Up and PPM will run in all constituencies (PPM will run in a coalition with AD in the Azores). MPT will only run in the Azores and Madeira after a deal with AD, with MPT leader Pedro Soares Pimenta running in the AD list in Lisbon.

Constituency	ADN	RIR	JPP	ND	PCTP	VP	E	MPT	PTP	NC	PPM	PLS
Aveiro	Inês Bastos	José Porfírio Santos	—N/a	Ricardo Gonçalves	Alexandre Caldeira	Spallou Ferreira	Ana Carla Antunes	—N/a	—N/a	Paulo Alves	José Américo Pereira	—N/a
Beja	Carlos Marcelino	Margarida Rosário	—N/a	Jorge Valente	Maria Valente Pinto	Íris La Féria	José Antunes	—N/a	—N/a	—N/a	Bento Fialho	—N/a
Braga	Gonçalo de Melo Bandeira	António Fernandes	João Manuel Horta	José Peixoto	—N/a	Miguel Amador	Tiago Rodrigues	—N/a	—N/a	—N/a	Sandra Alemão	—N/a
Bragança	Bruno Sá Coutinho	Damiana Falcão	—N/a	—N/a	—N/a	César Valente	Carlos Teles	—N/a	—N/a	—N/a	Maria dos Anjos Cidade	—N/a
Castelo Branco	Filipe Lourenço	Eva Sousa	—N/a	—N/a	José Albino Marrucho	Daniel Santana	Carlos Lobo	—N/a	—N/a	—N/a	Luís Duque-Vieira	—N/a
Coimbra	Sancho Antunes	Inês Tafula	João Ribeiro	Joana Rodrigues	—N/a	Manuel Baeta	Pedro Marques	—N/a	—N/a	—N/a	Manuel São João	—N/a
Évora	Rodrigo Paias	Ricardo Mendes	—N/a	—N/a	—N/a	Hélder Machado	Carla Ribeiro	—N/a	—N/a	Jorge Canhoto	Luís Madeira	—N/a
Faro	João Simplício	Rui Curado	Manuel Merceano	Carlos Natal	—N/a	Miguel Castelão	Fábio Fatal	—N/a	—N/a	—N/a	Joana Rego	—N/a
Guarda	Francisco Monteiro	Maria do Céu Rocha	—N/a	—N/a	—N/a	Olivier Carneiro	Diogo Casanova	—N/a	—N/a	Célio Alves	Manuel Borges	—N/a
Leiria	Nuno Barroso	Orlando Correia	—N/a	Fábio Soeiro	—N/a	Pedro Quintela	Daniel Ramos	—N/a	—N/a	—N/a	Sofia Inácio	—N/a
Lisbon	Joana Amaral Dias	**Márcia Henriques**	Vanessa Pereira	**Ossanda Liber**	**Cidália Guerreiro**	**Duarte Costa**	**Rui da Fonseca e Castro**	—N/a	—N/a	**Joaquim da Rocha Afonso**	**Gonçalo da Câmara Pereira**	Pedro Janeiro
Portalegre	Augusto Vieira	Emanuel Martins	—N/a	—N/a	António Corricas	Rita Vide	Madalena Utra Thomas	—N/a	—N/a	—N/a	Hugo Machado	—N/a
Porto	**Bruno Fialho**	Vitorino Silva	José Manuel Vieira	Israel Pontes	João Pinto	Ricardo Loureiro	Bruno Rebelo	—N/a	—N/a	Manuel de Jesus	António Maia	Daniel Amaral
Santarém	Marta Gameiro	André Antunes	—N/a	—N/a	—N/a	Jorge Silva	Filipe Esteves	—N/a	—N/a	—N/a	Américo Freitas	—N/a
Setúbal	Márcio Souza	Ana Paula Freitas	Luís Ribeiro	João Araújo	Nuno Correia da Silva	Diana Tavares	Carlos Pagara	—N/a	—N/a	José Pedro Pereira	Orlanda Matias	**José Cardoso**
Viana do Castelo	Luís Arezes	João Marcelo Almeida	—N/a	—N/a	—N/a	Vladimiro Osório	Ângelo Lima	—N/a	—N/a	—N/a	Raul Ferreira	—N/a
Vila Real	João Cabeço	António José Oliveira	—N/a	—N/a	—N/a	Sílvia Serafim	Irene Costa	—N/a	—N/a	—N/a	Edgardo Madeira	—N/a
Viseu	Luís Rafael Almeida	Luís Lourenço	—N/a	Carlos Andrade	—N/a	Jorge Vide	Pedro Pinto	—N/a	—N/a	—N/a	Luís Duarte Almeida	—N/a
Azores	Rui Matos	João Henriques	Carlos Furtado	—N/a	—N/a	—N/a	Roque Almeida	Manuel Carreira	—N/a	—N/a	—N/a	—N/a
Madeira	João Abreu	Joana Mendes	Filipe Sousa	Paulo Azevedo	—N/a	—N/a	António Araújo	Ricardo Camacho	Edgar Silva	—N/a	Luís Ornelas	—N/a
Europe	António José Ferro	Pedro Miguel Silva	**Élvio Sousa**	Pedro Godinho	António Morais	Ana Carvalho	Jorge Almeida	—N/a	—N/a	João Neto	Paulo Viana	Erik Weber
Outside Europe	Emília Gadelha	Luís Mendes	Lina Pereira	Alexandre Mendes	Humberto Freitas	Leandro Damasceno	Jorge Alves	—N/a	—N/a	Agostinho Barcelos	Deolinda Estêvão	Hélder Álvares
Sources												

== Elected candidates ==
=== Aveiro ===
==== Democratic Alliance ====
- Luís Montenegro (PSD)
- Emídio Sousa (PSD)
- Paula Cardoso (PSD)
- Silvério Regalado (PSD)
- Salvador Malheiro (PSD)
- Adriana Rodrigues (PSD)
- Almiro Moreira (PSD)

==== Socialist Party ====
- Pedro Nuno Santos
- Susana Correia
- Hugo Oliveira
- Carlos Neto Brandão

==== Chega ====
- Pedro Frazão
- Maria José Aguiar
- Armando Grave
- Pedro Tavares dos Santos

==== Liberal Initiative ====
- Mário Amorim Lopes

=== Beja ===
==== Chega ====
- Rui Cristina

==== Socialist Party ====
- Pedro do Carmo

==== Democratic Alliance ====
- Gonçalo Valente (PSD)

=== Braga ===
==== Democratic Alliance ====
- Hugo Soares (PSD)
- Ricardo Araújo (PSD)
- Sofia Fernandes (PSD)
- Emídio Guerreiro (PSD)
- Carlos Cação (PSD)
- Clara Marques Mendes (PSD)
- Joaquim Barroso (PSD)
- Ricardo Barroso (PSD)

==== Socialist Party ====
- José Luís Carneiro
- Sandra Lopes
- Pedro Miguel Sousa
- Paulo Lopes Silva
- Irene Costa

==== Chega ====
- Filipe Melo
- Rodrigo Alves Taxa

==== Liberal Initiative ====
- Rui Rocha

=== Bragança ===
==== Democratic Alliance ====
- Hernâni Dias (PSD)
- Nuno Gonçalves (PSD)

==== Socialist Party ====
- Júlia Rodrigues

=== Castelo Branco ===
==== Democratic Alliance ====
- Pedro Reis (PSD)
- Ricardo Aires (PSD)

==== Socialist Party ====
- Nuno Fazenda

==== Chega ====
- João Ribeiro

=== Coimbra ===
==== Democratic Alliance ====
- Rita Júdice (PSD)
- Maurício Marques (PSD)
- Pedro Machado (PSD)
- Ana Oliveira (PSD)

==== Socialist Party ====
- Pedro Delgado Alves
- Rosa Isabel Cruz
- Pedro Coimbra

==== Chega ====
- Paulo Seco
- Eliseu Neves

=== Évora ===
==== Socialist Party ====
- Luís Dias

==== Chega ====
- Jorge Valsassina Galveias

==== Democratic Alliance ====
- Francisco Figueira (PSD)

=== Faro ===
==== Chega ====
- Pedro Pinto
- João Graça
- Sandra Ribeiro
- António Moreira

==== Democratic Alliance ====
- Graça Carvalho (PSD)
- Cristóvão Norte (PSD)
- Bárbara Correia (PSD)

==== Socialist Party ====
- Jamila Madeira
- Jorge Botelho

=== Guarda ===
==== Democratic Alliance ====
- Dulcineia Moura (PSD)

==== Socialist Party ====
- Aida Carvalho

==== Chega ====
- Nuno Simões de Melo

=== Leiria ===
==== Democratic Alliance ====
- Margarida Balseiro Lopes (PSD)
- Hugo Patrício OIiveira (PSD)
- Sofia Carreira (PSD)
- João Paulo Santos (PSD)
- Ricardo Carvalho (PSD)

==== Chega ====
- Gabriel Mithá Ribeiro
- Luís Paulo Fernandes
- Cristina Henriques

==== Socialist Party ====
- Eurico Brilhante Dias
- Catarina Louro

=== Lisbon ===
==== Democratic Alliance ====
- Joaquim Miranda Sarmento (PSD)
- Miguel Pinto Luz (PSD)
- Regina Bastos (PSD)
- Paulo Núncio (CDS–PP)
- Alexandre Homem Cristo (PSD)
- Sandra Pereira (PSD)
- Alexandre Poço (PSD)
- João Vale e Azevedo (PSD)
- Cristina Vaz Tomé (PSD)
- Bruno Ventura (PSD)
- João Pedro Louro (PSD)
- Margarida Saavedra (PSD)
- Marco Claudino (PSD)
- António Rodrigues (PSD)
- Ana Isabel Xavier (PSD)

==== Socialist Party ====
- Mariana Vieira da Silva
- Miguel Cabrita
- Edite Estrela
- Frederico Francisco
- Pedro Vaz
- Isabel Moreira
- Ricardo Lima
- Eva Cruzeiro
- Miguel Costa Matos
- Ana Paula Bernardo
- André Rijo
- Davide Amado

==== Chega ====
- André Ventura
- Rui Paulo Sousa
- Marta Martins da Silva
- Pedro Pessanha
- Ricardo Dias Pinto
- Felicidade Vital
- Bruno Nunes
- José Barreira Soares
- Patrícia de Almeida
- Madalena Cordeiro
- Rui Cardoso

==== Liberal Initiative ====
- Mariana Leitão
- Rodrigo Saraiva
- Angélique da Teresa
- Jorge Miguel Teixeira

==== Livre ====
- Rui Tavares
- Isabel Mendes Lopes
- Patrícia Gonçalves

==== Unitary Democratic Coalition ====
- Paulo Raimundo (PCP)

==== Left Bloc ====
- Mariana Mortágua

==== People Animals Nature ====
- Inês Sousa Real

=== Portalegre ===
==== Chega ====
- João Aleixo

==== Socialist Party ====
- Luís Moreira Testa

=== Porto ===
==== Democratic Alliance ====
- Paulo Rangel (PSD)
- Nuno Melo (CDS–PP)
- Ana Gabriela Cabilhas (PSD)
- Miguel Guimarães (PSD)
- Carlos Abreu Amorim (PSD)
- Germana Rocha (PSD)
- Alberto Santos (PSD)
- Alberto Machado (PSD)
- Andreia Neto (PSD)
- Hugo Carneiro (PSD)
- Francisco Lopes (PSD)
- Carla Barros (PSD)
- Francisco Sousa Vieira (PSD)
- Rui Pereira (PSD)
- Olga Freire (PSD)

==== Socialist Party ====
- Fernando Araújo
- Sofia Pereira
- João Torres
- Tiago Barbosa Ribeiro
- Patrícia Ribeiro Faro
- Porfírio Silva
- Joana Ferreira Lima
- Eduardo Pinheiro
- Dália Lopes
- Humberto Brito
- José Carlos Barbosa

==== Chega ====
- Rui Afonso
- Diogo Pacheco de Amorim
- Cristina Rodrigues
- José António Carvalho
- Marcus Santos
- Sónia Monteiro
- Patrícia Nascimento
- Raúl Melo
- Idalina Costa

==== Liberal Initiative ====
- Carlos Guimarães Pinto
- Miguel Rangel

==== Livre ====
- Jorge Pinto
- Filipa Pinto

==== Unitary Democratic Coalition ====
- Alfredo Maia (PCP)

=== Setúbal ===
==== Chega ====
- Rita Matias
- Patrícia Carvalho
- Nuno Gabriel
- Daniel Teixeira
- Cláudia Estêvão
- Ricardo Reis

==== Socialist Party ====
- António Mendonça Mendes
- Eurídice Pereira
- André Pinotes Baptista
- Margarida Afonso
- Carlos João Pereira

==== Democratic Alliance ====
- Teresa Morais (PSD)
- Paulo Ribeiro (PSD)
- Bruno Vitorino (PSD)
- Sónia dos Reis (PSD)
- António Oliveira (PSD)

==== Unitary Democratic Coalition ====
- Paula Santos (PCP)

==== Livre ====
- Paulo Muacho

==== Liberal Initiative ====
- Joana Cordeiro

=== Viana do Castelo ===
==== Democratic Alliance ====
- José Pedro Aguiar-Branco (PSD)
- João Manuel Esteves (PSD)
- Manuela Carvalho Lopes (PSD)

==== Chega ====
- Eduardo Teixeira

==== Socialist Party ====
- Marina Gonçalves

=== Vila Real ===
==== Democratic Alliance ====
- Ana Paula Martins (PSD)
- Amílcar Almeida (PSD)
- Fernando Queiroga (PSD)

==== Socialist Party ====
- Rui Santos

==== Chega ====
- Manuela Tender

=== Viseu ===
==== Democratic Alliance ====
- António Leitão Amaro (PSD)
- Pedro Alves (PSD)
- Inês Domingos (PSD)
- Carlos Santiago (PSD)

==== Chega ====
- João Tilly
- Bernardo Pessanha

==== Socialist Party ====
- Elza Pais
- Armando Mourisco

=== Azores ===
==== Democratic Alliance ====
- Paulo Moniz (PSD)
- Francisco Pimentel (PSD)
- Maria Lobo Menezes (PSD)

==== Socialist Party ====
- Francisco César

==== Chega ====
- Francisco Lima

=== Madeira ===
==== Democratic Alliance ====
- Pedro Coelho (PSD)
- Vânia Jesus (PSD)
- Paulo Neves (PSD)

==== Chega ====
- Francisco Gomes

==== Socialist Party ====
- Emânuel Câmara

==== Together for the People ====
- Filipe Sousa

=== Europe ===
==== Chega ====
- José Dias Fernandes

==== Democratic Alliance ====
- José Manuel Fernandes (PSD)

=== Outside Europe ===
==== Chega ====
- Manuel Magno

==== Democratic Alliance ====
- José Cesário (PSD)

== See also ==
- List of political parties in Portugal
- Party lists for the 2019 Portuguese legislative election
- Party lists for the 2022 Portuguese legislative election
- Party lists for the 2024 Portuguese legislative election
