= Lisbon (Assembly of the Republic constituency) =

Constituency of the Assembly of the Republic, the national legislature of Portugal

- Lisboa
- Constituency for the Assembly of the Republic
- Location of Lisbon within Portugal
- District: Lisbon
- Population: 2,390,715 (2024)
- Electorate: 1,914,014 (2025)
- Area: 2,816 km^{2} (2024)

Current Constituency
- Created: 1976
- Seats: List: 48 (2019–present); 47 (2009–2019); 48 (2002–2009); 49 (1999–2002); 50 (1991–1999); 56 (1979–1991); 58 (1976–1979)
- Deputies: List: Patrícia de Almeida (CH); Davide Amado (PS); Regina Bastos (PSD); Ana Bernardo (PS); Miguel Cabrita (PS); Rui Cardoso (CH); Marco Claudino (PSD); Madalena Cordeiro (CH); Eva Cruzeiro (PS); Edite Estrela (PS); Liliana Fidalgo (PSD); Fabian Figueiredo (BE); Frederico Francisco (PS); Patricia Gonçalves (L); Gonçalo Lage (PSD); Mariana Leitão (IL); Ricardo Lima (PS); João Pedro Louro (PSD); Paulo Lopes Marcelo (PSD); Francisco José Martins (PSD); Miguel Costa Matos (PS); Isabel Moreira (PS); Paulo Núncio (CDS-PP); Bruno Nunes (CH); Sandra Pereira (PSD); Tomás Pereira (L); Pedro Pessanha (CH); Pedro Soares Pimenta (PSD); Eva Brás Pinho (PSD); Ricardo Dias Pinto (CH); Alexandre Poço (PSD); Paulo Raimundo (PCP); Inês Sousa Real (PAN); André Rijo (PS); António Rodrigues (PSD); Margarida Saavedra (PSD); Rodrigo Saraiva (IL); Mariana Vieira da Silva (PS); Marta Martins da Silva (CH); José Barreira Soares (CH); Rui Paulo Sousa (CH); Rui Tavares (L); Jorge Miguel Teixeira (IL); Angélique da Teresa (IL); Pedro Vaz (PS); André Ventura (CH); Bruno Ventura (PSD); Felicidade Vital (CH)

Lisbon (Portuguese: Lisboa) is one of the 22 multi-member constituencies of the Assembly of the Republic, the national legislature of Portugal. The constituency was established in 1976 when the Assembly of the Republic was established by the constitution following the restoration of democracy. It is conterminous with the district of Lisbon. The constituency currently elects 48 of the 230 members of the Assembly of the Republic using the closed party-list proportional representation electoral system. At the 2025 legislative election it had 1,914,014 registered electors.

== Electoral system ==
Lisbon currently elects 48 of the 230 members of the Assembly of the Republic using the closed party-list proportional representation electoral system. Seats are allocated using the D'Hondt method.

== Election results ==
=== Summary ===
Election	Unitary Democrats CDU / APU / PCP			Left Bloc BE / UDP			LIVRE L			Socialists PS / FRS			People Animals Nature PAN			Democratic Renewal PRD			Social Democrats PSD / PàF / AD / PPD			Liberals IL			CDS – People's CDS–PP / CDS			Chega CH / PPV/CDC / PPV		
Election	Votes	%	Seats	Votes	%	Seats	Votes	%	Seats	Votes	%	Seats	Votes	%	Seats	Votes	%	Seats	Votes	%	Seats	Votes	%	Seats	Votes	%	Seats	Votes	%	Seats
2025	45,452	3.64%	1	29,959	2.40%	1	87,618	7.02%	3	301,787	24.19%	12	23,387	1.87%	1				362,844	29.08%	15	97,200	7.79%	4				266,214	21.34%	11
2024	49,267	3.82%	2	65,365	5.07%	2	72,259	5.60%	2	365,937	28.36%	15	32,825	2.54%	1				356,973	27.67%	14	86,963	6.74%	3				224,642	17.41%	9
2022	59,899	5.16%	2	55,802	4.81%	2	28,854	2.49%	1	483,034	41.60%	21	23,577	2.03%	1				285,646	24.60%	13	93,567	8.06%	4	19,558	1.68%	0	92,001	7.92%	4
2019	85,660	8.08%	4	106,793	10.08%	5	22,738	2.15%	1	404,015	38.13%	20	48,440	4.57%	2				248,510	23.45%	12	27,090	2.56%	1	48,367	4.56%	2	22,028	2.08%	1
2015	113,437	10.19%	5	125,469	11.27%	5	14,687	1.32%	0	386,437	34.72%	18	22,628	2.03%	1				399,597	35.90%	18									
2011	111,661	9.95%	5	66,874	5.96%	3				322,034	28.68%	14	16,913	1.51%	0				399,124	35.55%	18				161,241	14.36%	7	1,990	0.18%	0
2009	113,564	10.22%	5	124,251	11.18%	5				417,561	37.57%	19							288,343	25.94%	13				126,154	11.35%	5			
2005	115,709	10.07%	5	103,944	9.05%	4				523,537	45.58%	23							280,697	24.44%	12				97,659	8.50%	4			
2002	100,208	8.96%	4	53,092	4.75%	2				440,790	39.43%	20							406,499	36.36%	18				96,543	8.64%	4			
1999	140,092	12.56%	6	55,340	4.96%	2				486,624	43.62%	23							310,577	27.84%	14				97,028	8.70%	4			
1995	151,351	12.19%	6	8,095	0.65%	0				559,551	45.07%	24							365,857	29.47%	15				118,547	9.55%	5			
1991	149,315	12.37%	6							365,112	30.26%	16				7,427	0.62%	0	556,881	46.15%	25				49,194	4.08%	2			
1987	203,263	16.78%	10	17,617	1.45%	0				261,129	21.56%	12				84,433	6.97%	4	564,553	46.60%	28				45,465	3.75%	2			
1985	258,808	20.50%	12	20,758	1.64%	0				255,030	20.20%	12				273,685	21.68%	13	329,783	26.12%	15				104,010	8.24%	4			
1983	320,066	25.78%	15							453,116	36.49%	21							276,660	22.28%	13				148,379	11.95%	7			
1980	304,693	23.48%	13	22,935	1.77%	1				370,412	28.55%	17							548,892	42.31%	25									
1979	341,658	26.56%	16	36,388	2.83%	1				339,032	26.36%	15							523,583	40.71%	24									
1976	260,554	22.53%	14	31,409	2.72%	1				458,713	39.66%	25							196,031	16.95%	10				157,554	13.62%	8			

(Figures in italics represent alliances.)

=== Detailed ===
==== 2020s ====
===== 2025 =====
Results of the 2025 legislative election held on 18 May 2025:

Party		Votes	%	Seats
Democratic Alliance	AD	362,844	29.08%	15
Socialist Party	PS	301,787	24.19%	12
Chega	CH	266,214	21.34%	11
Liberal Initiative	IL	97,200	7.79%	4
LIVRE	L	87,618	7.02%	3
Unitary Democratic Coalition	CDU	45,452	3.64%	1
Left Bloc	BE	29,959	2.40%	1
People Animals Nature	PAN	23,387	1.87%	1
National Democratic Alternative	ADN	15,454	1.24%	0
Portuguese Workers' Communist Party	PCTP	3,659	0.29%	0
Volt Portugal	Volt	3,157	0.25%	0
React, Include, Recycle	RIR	2,196	0.18%	0
Ergue-te	E	2,181	0.17%	0
New Right	ND	2,021	0.16%	0
Liberal Social Party	PLS	1,901	0.15%	0
People's Monarchist Party	PPM	939	0.08%	0
Together for the People	JPP	820	0.07%	0
We, the Citizens!	NC	756	0.06%	0
Valid votes		1,247,545	100.00%	48
Blank votes		16,115	1.26%	
Rejected votes – other		10,861	0.85%	
Total polled		1,274,521	66.59%	
Registered electors		1,914,014		

The following candidates were elected:: Patrícia de Almeida (CH); Davide Amado (PS); João Vale e Azevedo (AD); Regina Bastos (AD); Ana Bernardo (PS); Miguel Cabrita (PS); Rui Cardoso (CH); Marco Claudino (AD); Madalena Cordeiro (CH); Alexandre Homem Cristo (AD); Eva Cruzeiro (PS); Edite Estrela (PS); Frederico Francisco (PS); Patricia Gonçalves (L); Mariana Leitão (IL); Ricardo Lima (PS); João Pedro Louro (AD); Miguel Pinto Luz (AD); Miguel Costa Matos (PS); Isabel Mendes Lopes (L); Isabel Moreira (PS); Mariana Mortágua (BE); Paulo Núncio (AD); Bruno Nunes (CH); Sandra Pereira (AD); Pedro Pessanha (CH); Ricardo Dias Pinto (CH); Alexandre Poço (AD); Paulo Raimundo (CDU); Inês Sousa Real (PAN); André Rijo (PS); António Rodrigues (AD); Margarida Saavedra (AD); Rodrigo Saraiva (IL); Joaquim Miranda Sarmento (AD); Mariana Vieira da Silva (PS); Marta Martins da Silva (CH); José Barreira Soares (CH); Rui Paulo Sousa (CH); Rui Tavares (L); Jorge Miguel Teixeira (IL); Angélique da Teresa (IL); Cristina Vaz Tomé (AD); Pedro Vaz (PS); André Ventura (CH); Bruno Ventura (AD); Felicidade Vital (CH); and Ana Isabel Xavier (AD).

===== 2024 =====
Results of the 2024 legislative election held on 10 March 2024:

Party		Votes	%	Seats
Socialist Party	PS	365,937	28.36%	15
Democratic Alliance	AD	356,973	27.67%	14
Chega	CH	224,642	17.41%	9
Liberal Initiative	IL	86,963	6.74%	3
LIVRE	L	72,259	5.60%	2
Left Bloc	BE	65,365	5.07%	2
Unitary Democratic Coalition	CDU	49,267	3.82%	2
People Animals Nature	PAN	32,825	2.54%	1
National Democratic Alternative	ADN	19,087	1.48%	0
Portuguese Workers' Communist Party	PCTP	4,463	0.35%	0
Volt Portugal	Volt	2,962	0.23%	0
React, Include, Recycle	RIR	2,846	0.22%	0
New Right	ND	2,370	0.18%	0
Portuguese Labour Party	PTP	1,323	0.10%	0
Alternative 21 (Earth Party and Alliance)	PT-A	1,151	0.09%	0
Ergue-te	E	1,001	0.08%	0
Together for the People	JPP	847	0.07%	0
Valid votes		1,290,281	100.00%	48
Blank votes		15,712	1.19%	
Rejected votes – other		13,568	1.03%	
Total polled		1,319,561	68.90%	
Registered electors		1,915,287		

The following candidates were elected: Pedro Delgado Alves (PS); João Vale e Azevedo (AD); Maria Begonha (PS); Ana Bernardo (PS); Bernardo Blanco (IL); Miguel Cabrita (PS); Marco Claudino (AD); Madalena Cordeiro (CH); Alexandre Homem Cristo (AD); Edite Estrela (PS); Fabian Figueiredo (BE); António Filipe (CDU); Gonçalo Lage (AD); Mariana Leitão (IL); Ricardo Lima (PS); Ana Paula Martins (AD); Fernando Medina (PS); Isabel Mendes Lopes (L); Luís Montenegro (AD); Isabel Moreira (PS); Mariana Mortágua (BE); Luís Newton (AD); Paulo Núncio (AD); Bruno Nunes (CH); Marcos Perestrello (PS); Carlos Pereira (PS); Sandra Pereira (AD); Pedro Pessanha (CH); Eva Brás Pinho (AD); Ricardo Dias Pinto (CH); Sérgio Sousa Pinto (PS); Alexandre Poço (AD); Paulo Raimundo (CDU); Inês Sousa Real (PAN); André Rijo (PS); Margarida Saavedra (AD); Rodrigo Saraiva (IL); Joaquim Miranda Sarmento (AD); Mariana Vieira da Silva (PS); Marta Martins da Silva (CH); José Barreira Soares (CH); Rui Paulo Sousa (CH); Rui Tavares (L); Marta Temido (PS); Pedro Vaz (PS); André Ventura (CH); Bruno Ventura (AD); and Felicidade Vital (CH).

===== 2022 =====
Results of the 2022 legislative election held on 30 January 2022:

Party		Votes	%	Seats
Socialist Party	PS	483,034	41.60%	21
Social Democratic Party	PSD	285,646	24.60%	13
Liberal Initiative	IL	93,567	8.06%	4
Chega	CH	92,001	7.92%	4
Unitary Democratic Coalition	CDU	59,899	5.16%	2
Left Bloc	BE	55,802	4.81%	2
LIVRE	L	28,854	2.49%	1
People Animals Nature	PAN	23,577	2.03%	1
CDS – People's Party	CDS–PP	19,558	1.68%	0
Portuguese Workers' Communist Party	PCTP	4,924	0.42%	0
National Democratic Alternative	ADN	3,208	0.28%	0
React, Include, Recycle	RIR	3,028	0.26%	0
Earth Party	PT	1,489	0.13%	0
Socialist Alternative Movement	MAS	1,423	0.12%	0
Volt Portugal	Volt	1,360	0.12%	0
We, the Citizens!	NC	882	0.08%	0
Together for the People	JPP	820	0.07%	0
Ergue-te	E	818	0.07%	0
Alliance	A	747	0.06%	0
Portuguese Labour Party	PTP	486	0.04%	0
Valid votes		1,161,123	100.00%	48
Blank votes		11,918	1.01%	
Rejected votes – other		8,820	0.75%	
Total polled		1,181,861	61.56%	
Registered electors		1,919,958		

The following candidates were elected: Pedro Delgado Alves (PS); Susana Amador (PS); Ana Sofia Antunes (PS); Maria Emília Apolinário (PSD); Bernardo Blanco (IL); Miguel Cabrita (PS); Carla Castro (IL); Pedro Cegonho (PS); Duarte Cordeiro (PS); António Costa (PS); Edite Estrela (PS); Romualda Fernandes (PS); João Cotrim de Figueiredo (IL); Graça Fonseca (PS); Maria de Fátima Fonseca (PS); João Galamba (PS); Ricardo Baptista Leite (PSD); Joana Barata Lopes (PSD); Lina Lopes (PSD); Rita Madeira (PS); Rita Matias (CH); Miguel Matos (PS); Fernando Medina (PS); Isabel Meirelles (PSD); Sérgio Monte (PS); Isabel Moreira (PS); Mariana Mortágua (BE); Duarte Pacheco (PSD); Marcos Perestrello (PS); Pedro Pessanha (CH); Sérgio Sousa Pinto (PS); Alexandre Poço (PSD); António Prôa (PSD); Inês Sousa Real (PAN); Alma Rivera (CDU); Pedro Roque (PSD); Maria da Luz Rosinha (PS); Tiago Moreira de Sá (PSD); Rodrigo Saraiva (IL); Joaquim Miranda Sarmento (PSD); Mariana Vieira da Silva (PS); José Silvano (PSD); Alexandre Simões (PSD); Pedro Filipe Soares (BE); Jerónimo de Sousa (CDU); Rui Paulo Sousa (CH); Rui Tavares (L); and André Ventura (CH).

==== 2010s ====
===== 2019 =====
Results of the 2019 legislative election held on 6 October 2019:

Party		Votes	%	Seats
Socialist Party	PS	404,015	38.13%	20
Social Democratic Party	PSD	248,510	23.45%	12
Left Bloc	BE	106,793	10.08%	5
Unitary Democratic Coalition	CDU	85,660	8.08%	4
People Animals Nature	PAN	48,440	4.57%	2
CDS – People's Party	CDS–PP	48,367	4.56%	2
Liberal Initiative	IL	27,090	2.56%	1
LIVRE	L	22,738	2.15%	1
Chega	CH	22,028	2.08%	1
Alliance	A	13,860	1.31%	0
Portuguese Workers' Communist Party	PCTP	8,923	0.84%	0
National Renewal Party	PNR	4,811	0.45%	0
React, Include, Recycle	RIR	4,525	0.43%	0
Earth Party	PT	2,776	0.26%	0
We, the Citizens!	NC	2,703	0.26%	0
United Party of Retirees and Pensioners	PURP	2,101	0.20%	0
People's Monarchist Party	PPM	1,946	0.18%	0
Democratic Republican Party	PDR	1,881	0.18%	0
Socialist Alternative Movement	MAS	1,243	0.12%	0
Portuguese Labour Party	PTP	1,163	0.11%	0
Valid votes		1,059,573	100.00%	48
Blank votes		23,683	2.15%	
Rejected votes – other		15,998	1.46%	
Total polled		1,099,254	57.33%	
Registered electors		1,917,369		

The following candidates were elected: Duarte Alves (CDU); Pedro Delgado Alves (PS); Susana Amador (PS); Ana Sofia Antunes (PS); Ana Rita Bessa (CDS-PP); Pedro Cegonho (PS); Mário Centeno (PS); António Costa (PS); Jorge Costa (BE); João Gomes Cravinho (PS); Assunção Cristas (CDS-PP); Beatriz Gomes Dias (BE); Edite Estrela (PS); Romualda Fernandes (PS); João Cotrim de Figueiredo (IL); Graça Fonseca (PS); Maria de Fátima Fonseca (PS); Luís Marques Guedes (PSD); Jorge Lacão (PS); Ricardo Leão (PS); Ricardo Baptista Leite (PSD); Lina Lopes (PSD); Miguel Matos (PS); Isabel Meirelles (PSD); Isabel Moreira (PS); Mariana Mortágua (BE); Duarte Pacheco (PSD); Sandra Pereira (PSD); Marcos Perestrello (PS); Pedro Pinto (PSD); Sérgio Sousa Pinto (PS); Isabel Pires (BE); Alexandre Poço (PSD); Inês Sousa Real (PAN); Alma Rivera (CDU); Eduardo Ferro Rodrigues (PS); Pedro Rodrigues (PSD); Filipa Roseta (PSD); Maria da Luz Rosinha (PS); André Lourenço e Silva (PAN); Carlos Silva (PSD); Mariana Silva (CDU); Mariana Vieira da Silva (PS); José Silvano (PSD); Pedro Filipe Soares (BE); Jerónimo de Sousa (CDU); Rui Tavares (L); and André Ventura (CH).

===== 2015 =====
Results of the 2015 legislative election held on 4 October 2015:

Party		Votes	%	Seats
Portugal Ahead	PàF	399,597	35.90%	18
Socialist Party	PS	386,437	34.72%	18
Left Bloc	BE	125,469	11.27%	5
Unitary Democratic Coalition	CDU	113,437	10.19%	5
People Animals Nature	PAN	22,628	2.03%	1
LIVRE	L	14,687	1.32%	0
Portuguese Workers' Communist Party	PCTP	11,090	1.00%	0
Democratic Republican Party	PDR	10,250	0.92%	0
National Renewal Party	PNR	7,187	0.65%	0
The Earth Party Movement	MPT	5,079	0.46%	0
ACT! (Portuguese Labour Party and Socialist Alternative Movement)	AGIR	5,039	0.45%	0
United Party of Retirees and Pensioners	PURP	4,001	0.36%	0
We, the Citizens!	NC	3,744	0.34%	0
People's Monarchist Party	PPM	2,823	0.25%	0
Together for the People	JPP	1,561	0.14%	0
Valid votes		1,113,029	100.00%	47
Blank votes		22,185	1.93%	
Rejected votes – other		16,867	1.46%	
Total polled		1,152,081	60.60%	
Registered electors		1,901,233		

The following candidates were elected: Pedro Delgado Alves (PS); Susana Amador (PS); Filipe Lobo d'Ávila (PàF); Sérgio de Azevedo (PàF); Ana Rita Bessa (PàF); Júlio Miranda Calha (PS); Vitalino Canas (PS); Mário Centeno (PS); Pedro Passos Coelho (PàF); José de Matos Correia (PàF); António Costa (PS); Jorge Costa (BE); Paula Teixeira da Cruz (PàF); Edite Estrela (PS); José Luís Ferreira (CDU); Graça Fonseca (PS); Luís Marques Guedes (PàF); Jorge Lacão (PS); Diogo Leão (PS); Joana Barata Lopes (PàF); Ana Mesquita (CDU); Isabel Moreira (PS); Mariana Mortágua (BE); Isabel Galriça Neto (PàF); Duarte Pacheco (PàF); Sandra Pereira (PàF); Marcos Perestrello (PS); Pedro Pinto (PàF); Sérgio Sousa Pinto (PS); Isabel Pires (BE); Paulo Portas (PàF); Joaquim Raposo (PS); Rita Rato (CDU); João Rebelo (PàF); Eduardo Ferro Rodrigues (PS); Pedro Roque (PàF); José de Matos Rosa (PàF); Helena Roseta (PS); Maria da Luz Rosinha (PS); Carlos Silva (PàF); Odete Silva (PàF); André Lourenço e Silva (PAN); Jorge Falcato Simões (BE); João Soares (PS); Pedro Filipe Soares (BE); Jerónimo de Sousa (CDU); and Miguel Tiago (CDU).

===== 2011 =====
Results of the 2011 legislative election held on 5 June 2011:

Party		Votes	%	Seats
Social Democratic Party	PSD	399,124	35.55%	18
Socialist Party	PS	322,034	28.68%	14
CDS – People's Party	CDS–PP	161,241	14.36%	7
Unitary Democratic Coalition	CDU	111,661	9.95%	5
Left Bloc	BE	66,874	5.96%	3
Party for Animals and Nature	PAN	16,913	1.51%	0
Portuguese Workers' Communist Party	PCTP	14,419	1.28%	0
Hope for Portugal Movement	MEP	6,208	0.55%	0
National Renewal Party	PNR	5,897	0.53%	0
People's Monarchist Party	PPM	4,270	0.38%	0
The Earth Party Movement	MPT	4,135	0.37%	0
Portuguese Labour Party	PTP	2,410	0.21%	0
Pro-Life Party	PPV	1,990	0.18%	0
New Democracy Party	ND	1,937	0.17%	0
Workers' Party of Socialist Unity	POUS	1,829	0.16%	0
Humanist Party	PH	1,764	0.16%	0
Valid votes		1,122,706	100.00%	47
Blank votes		31,230	2.67%	
Rejected votes – other		15,531	1.33%	
Total polled		1,169,467	62.12%	
Registered electors		1,882,740		

The following candidates were elected: Pedro Delgado Alves (PS); Sérgio de Azevedo (PSD); Ana Sofia Bettencourt (PSD); Teresa Caeiro (CDS-PP); Vitalino Canas (PS); Miguel Coelho (PS); José de Matos Correia (PSD); Alberto Costa (PS); Paula Teixeira da Cruz (PSD); Ana Drago (BE); Maria da Assunção Esteves (PSD); Pedro Farmhouse (PS); Luís Fazenda (BE); José Luís Ferreira (CDU); Mónica Ferro (PSD); Rui Paulo Figueiredo (PS); Jorge Lacão (PS); Joana Barata Lopes (PSD); Francisco Louçã (BE); Inês de Medeiros (PS); Isabel Moreira (PS); Isabel Galriça Neto (CDS-PP); Fernando Nobre (PSD); Adolfo Mesquita Nunes (CDS-PP); Duarte Pacheco (PSD); Inês Teotónio Pereira (CDS-PP); Marcos Perestrello (PS); Maria José Nogueira Pinto (PSD); Paulo Mota Pinto (PSD); Pedro Pinto (PSD); Ramos Preto (PS); António Prôa (PSD); José Lino Ramos (CDS-PP); Rita Rato (CDU); João Rebelo (CDS-PP); António Rodrigues (PSD); Eduardo Ferro Rodrigues (PS); José de Matos Rosa (PSD); Maria de Belém Roseira (PS); Maria Antónia Almeida Santos (PS); Carlos Silva (PSD); Hélder Sousa Silva (PSD); Odete Silva (PSD); Bernardino Soares (CDU); Pedro Mota Soares (CDS-PP); Jerónimo de Sousa (CDU); and Miguel Tiago (CDU).

==== 2000s ====
===== 2009 =====
Results of the 2009 legislative election held on 27 September 2009:

Party		Votes	%	Seats
Socialist Party	PS	417,561	37.57%	19
Social Democratic Party	PSD	288,343	25.94%	13
CDS – People's Party	CDS–PP	126,154	11.35%	5
Left Bloc	BE	124,251	11.18%	5
Unitary Democratic Coalition	CDU	113,564	10.22%	5
Portuguese Workers' Communist Party	PCTP	10,012	0.90%	0
Hope for Portugal Movement	MEP	9,403	0.85%	0
Merit and Society Movement	MMS	4,634	0.42%	0
National Renewal Party	PNR	4,367	0.39%	0
New Democracy Party	ND	4,197	0.38%	0
People's Monarchist Party	PPM	3,193	0.29%	0
The Earth Party Movement and Humanist Party	MPT-PH	3,093	0.28%	0
Portuguese Labour Party	PTP	1,874	0.17%	0
Workers' Party of Socialist Unity	POUS	844	0.08%	0
Valid votes		1,111,490	100.00%	47
Blank votes		21,898	1.91%	
Rejected votes – other		15,450	1.34%	
Total polled		1,148,838	61.53%	
Registered electors		1,867,233		

The following candidates were elected: Miguel Vale de Almeida (PS); António Leitão Amaro (PSD); Celeste Amaro (PSD); Maria Manuela Augusto (PS); Teresa Caeiro (CDS-PP); Rita Calvário (BE); Vitalino Canas (PS); Clara Carneiro (PSD); Miguel Coelho (PS); Duarte Cordeiro (PS); Celeste Correia (PS); José de Matos Correia (PSD); Alberto Costa (PS); Helena Lopes da Costa (PSD); Teresa Damásio (PS); Ana Drago (BE); Pedro Farmhouse (PS); Luís Fazenda (BE); Custódia Fernandes (PS); José Luís Ferreira (CDU); Jaime Gama (PS); Luís Marques Guedes (PSD); José Vera Jardim (PS); Manuela Ferreira Leite (PSD); Francisco Louçã (BE); Pedro Lynce (PSD); Inês de Medeiros (PS); Manuela de Melo (PS); Isabel Galriça Neto (CDS-PP); Duarte Pacheco (PSD); Rui Pereira (PS); Helena Pinto (BE); Maria José Nogueira Pinto (PSD); António Silva Preto (PSD); Ramos Preto (PS); Rui Prudêncio (PS); Rita Rato (CDU); João Rebelo (CDS-PP); Pedro Brandão Rodrigues (CDS-PP); José de Matos Rosa (PSD); Marcos Sá (PS); Arménio Santos (PSD); João Serrano (PS); Bernardino Soares (CDU); Pedro Mota Soares (CDS-PP); Jerónimo de Sousa (CDU); and Miguel Tiago (CDU).

===== 2005 =====
Results of the 2005 legislative election held on 20 February 2005:

Party		Votes	%	Seats
Socialist Party	PS	523,537	45.58%	23
Social Democratic Party	PSD	280,697	24.44%	12
Unitary Democratic Coalition	CDU	115,709	10.07%	5
Left Bloc	BE	103,944	9.05%	4
CDS – People's Party	CDS–PP	97,659	8.50%	4
Portuguese Workers' Communist Party	PCTP	10,985	0.96%	0
New Democracy Party	ND	7,203	0.63%	0
Humanist Party	PH	3,583	0.31%	0
National Renewal Party	PNR	2,721	0.24%	0
Workers' Party of Socialist Unity	POUS	1,424	0.12%	0
Democratic Party of the Atlantic	PDA	1,137	0.10%	0
Valid votes		1,148,599	100.00%	48
Blank votes		25,528	2.15%	
Rejected votes – other		12,537	1.06%	
Total polled		1,186,664	66.38%	
Registered electors		1,787,560		

The following candidates were elected: Manuel Alegre (PS); Susana Amador (PS); António Filipe (CDU); José Augusto Carvalho (PS); Jorge Coelho (PS); Miguel Coelho (PS); Celeste Correia (PS); José de Matos Correia (PSD); Telmo Correia (CDS-PP); Helena Lopes da Costa (PSD); Leonor Coutinho (PS); Ana Couto (PS); Rui Cunha (PS); Ana Drago (BE); Pedro Farmhouse (PS); Luís Fazenda (BE); Custódia Fernandes (PS); Henrique Rocha de Freitas (PSD); António Galamba (PS); Jaime Gama (PS); Pedro Quartin Graça (PSD); Luís Marques Guedes (PSD); José Vera Jardim (PS); José Lamego (PS); Francisco Madeira Lopes (CDU); Pedro Santana Lopes (PSD); Francisco Louçã (BE); Manuel Dias Loureiro (PSD); António Carlos Monteiro (CDS-PP); Nuno da Câmara Pereira (PSD); Helena Pinto (BE); Pedro Pinto (PSD); António Silva Preto (PSD); Ramos Preto (PS); João Rebelo (CDS-PP); Eduardo Ferro Rodrigues (PS); Humberto Rosa (PS); Maria de Belém Roseira (PS); Arménio Santos (PSD); João Serrano (PS); Rui Gomes da Silva (PSD); Bernardino Soares (CDU); João Soares (PS); Pedro Mota Soares (CDS-PP); Jerónimo de Sousa (CDU); Miguel Tiago (CDU); Rui Vieira (PS); and Ana Paula Vitorino (PS).

===== 2002 =====
Results of the 2002 legislative election held on 17 March 2002:

Party		Votes	%	Seats
Socialist Party	PS	440,790	39.43%	20
Social Democratic Party	PSD	406,499	36.36%	18
Unitary Democratic Coalition	CDU	100,208	8.96%	4
CDS – People's Party	CDS–PP	96,543	8.64%	4
Left Bloc	BE	53,092	4.75%	2
Portuguese Workers' Communist Party	PCTP	7,858	0.70%	0
The Earth Party Movement	MPT	4,554	0.41%	0
People's Monarchist Party	PPM	4,040	0.36%	0
National Renewal Party	PNR	1,614	0.14%	0
Humanist Party	PH	1,583	0.14%	0
Workers' Party of Socialist Unity	POUS	1,176	0.11%	0
Valid votes		1,117,957	100.00%	48
Blank votes		13,215	1.16%	
Rejected votes – other		8,930	0.78%	
Total polled		1,140,102	63.23%	
Registered electors		1,803,214		

The following candidates were elected: Manuel Alegre (PS); João Almeida (CDS-PP); António Filipe (CDU); Maria Eduarda Azevedo (PSD); Acácio Barreiros (PS); Álvaro Barreto (PSD); José Manuel Barroso (PSD); Gonçalo Capitão (PSD); Carlos Carvalhas (CDU); Alberto Arons de Carvalho (PS); José Augusto Carvalho (PS); Isabel Castro (CDU); Vieira de Castro (PSD); Henrique Chaves (PSD); Jorge Coelho (PS); Miguel Coelho (PS); Celeste Correia (PS); José de Matos Correia (PSD); Telmo Correia (CDS-PP); José Pereira da Costa (PSD); Leonor Coutinho (PS); Edite Estrela (PS); Luís Fazenda (BE); Custódia Fernandes (PS); António Galamba (PS); Jaime Gama (PS); Luís Marques Guedes (PSD); José Vera Jardim (PS); David Justino (PSD); Manuela Ferreira Leite (PSD); Francisco Louçã (BE); Duarte Pacheco (PSD); António Silva Preto (PSD); Ramos Preto (PS); João Rebelo (CDS-PP); Gonçalo Reis (PSD); Eduardo Ferro Rodrigues (PS); Pedro Brandão Rodrigues (CDS-PP); Maria do Carmo Romão (PS); Pedro Roseta (PSD); Arménio Santos (PSD); António José Seguro (PS); Rui Gomes da Silva (PSD); Vicente Jorge Silva (PS); Bernardino Soares (CDU); João Soares (PS); Susana Toscano (PSD); and Rui Vieira (PS).

==== 1990s ====
===== 1999 =====
Results of the 1999 legislative election held on 10 October 1999:

Party		Votes	%	Seats
Socialist Party	PS	486,624	43.62%	23
Social Democratic Party	PSD	310,577	27.84%	14
Unitary Democratic Coalition	CDU	140,092	12.56%	6
CDS – People's Party	CDS–PP	97,028	8.70%	4
Left Bloc	BE	55,340	4.96%	2
Portuguese Workers' Communist Party	PCTP	9,434	0.85%	0
The Earth Party Movement	MPT	6,203	0.56%	0
People's Monarchist Party	PPM	4,827	0.43%	0
Humanist Party	PH	2,082	0.19%	0
National Solidarity Party	PSN	1,813	0.16%	0
Workers' Party of Socialist Unity	POUS	1,501	0.13%	0
Valid votes		1,115,521	100.00%	49
Blank votes		14,823	1.30%	
Rejected votes – other		9,362	0.82%	
Total polled		1,139,706	62.48%	
Registered electors		1,823,980		

The following candidates were elected: Fátima Amaral (CDU); José Luís Arnaut (PSD); Acácio Barreiros (PS); Álvaro Barreto (PSD); António Filipe (CDU); José Manuel Barroso (PSD); Carlos Carvalhas (CDU); Alberto Arons de Carvalho (PS); José Augusto Carvalho (PS); Isabel Castro (CDU); Miguel Coelho (PS); Narana Coissoró (CDS-PP); José de Matos Correia (PSD); Telmo Correia (CDS-PP); Alberto Costa (PS); António Costa (PS); Leonor Coutinho (PS); Edite Estrela (PS); Luís Fazenda (BE); Henrique Rocha de Freitas (PSD); António Galamba (PS); Jaime Gama (PS); João Eduardo Alves de Moura Geraldes (CDU); Luís Nobre Guedes (CDS-PP); José Vera Jardim (PS); David Justino (PSD); Manuela Ferreira Leite (PSD); Duarte Lima (PSD); Francisco Louçã (BE); José Magalhães (PS); José Eduardo Martins (PSD); Cláudio Monteiro (PS); Isaltino Morais (PSD); Joaquim Pina Moura (PS); Joaquim Raposo (PS); João Rebelo (CDS-PP); Maria do Carmo Romão (PS); Helena Roseta (PS); Pedro Roseta (PSD); Maria da Luz Rosinha (PS); António de Almeida Santos (PS); Arménio Santos (PSD); José Maria Ministro dos Santos (PSD); Maria Amélia Santos (PS); Rui Gomes da Silva (PSD); Bernardino Soares (CDU); João Soares (PS); Francisco Torres (PS); and Rui Vieira (PS).

===== 1995 =====
Results of the 1995 legislative election held on 1 October 1995:

Party		Votes	%	Seats
Socialist Party	PS	559,551	45.07%	24
Social Democratic Party	PSD	365,857	29.47%	15
Unitary Democratic Coalition	CDU	151,351	12.19%	6
CDS – People's Party	CDS–PP	118,547	9.55%	5
Revolutionary Socialist Party	PSR	16,857	1.36%	0
Portuguese Workers' Communist Party	PCTP	9,113	0.73%	0
Popular Democratic Union	UDP	8,095	0.65%	0
The Earth Party Movement	MPT	5,506	0.44%	0
People's Party	PG	2,481	0.20%	0
National Solidarity Party	PSN	1,929	0.16%	0
Democratic Party of the Atlantic	PDA	1,211	0.10%	0
Unity Movement for Workers	MUT	1,011	0.08%	0
Valid votes		1,241,509	100.00%	50
Blank votes		11,689	0.93%	
Rejected votes – other		9,058	0.72%	
Total polled		1,262,256	67.23%	
Registered electors		1,877,610		

The following candidates were elected: Joaquim Ferreira do Amaral (PSD); Maria Eduarda Azevedo (PSD); Acácio Barreiros (PS); António Filipe (CDU); José Manuel Barroso (PSD); Pedro Holstein Campilho (PSD); Carlos Carvalhas (CDU); Arlindo de Carvalho (PSD); José Augusto Carvalho (PS); Isabel Castro (CDU); Jorge Coelho (PS); Pedro Passos Coelho (PSD); Macário Correia (PSD); Alberto Costa (PS); António Costa (PS); Leonor Coutinho (PS); João Cravinho (PS); Rui Cunha (PS); Elisa Maria Damião (PS); Edite Estrela (PS); Jorge Ferreira (CDS-PP); João Corregedor da Fonseca (CDU); António Galamba (PS); Jaime Gama (PS); Manuel Jorge Goes (PS); Luís Nobre Guedes (CDS-PP); Manuela Moura Guedes (CDS-PP); José Magalhães (PS); Fernando Pereira Marques (PS); Francisco José Martins (PSD); Nuno Baltazar Mendes (PS); Isaltino Morais (PSD); Fernando Pedro Moutinho (PSD); Barbosa de Oliveira (PS); Fernando Manuel Barbosa Faria de Oliveira (PSD); Maria José Nogueira Pinto (CDS-PP); Luís Queiró (CDS-PP); Raul Rego (PS); Eduardo Ferro Rodrigues (PS); Helena Roseta (PS); Pedro Roseta (PSD); Maria da Luz Rosinha (PS); Luís Sá (CDU); António de Almeida Santos (PS); Arménio Santos (PSD); Pinto Simões (PS); Bernardino Soares (CDU); Crisóstomo Teixeira (PS); Francisco Torres (PSD); and Vasco Pulido Valente (PSD).

===== 1991 =====
Results of the 1991 legislative election held on 6 October 1991:

Party		Votes	%	Seats
Social Democratic Party	PSD	556,881	46.15%	25
Socialist Party	PS	365,112	30.26%	16
Unitary Democratic Coalition	CDU	149,315	12.37%	6
Social Democratic Centre Party	CDS	49,194	4.08%	2
National Solidarity Party	PSN	32,142	2.66%	1
Revolutionary Socialist Party	PSR	22,088	1.83%	0
Portuguese Workers' Communist Party	PCTP	13,300	1.10%	0
Democratic Renewal Party	PRD	7,427	0.62%	0
People's Monarchist Party	PPM	6,678	0.55%	0
Democratic Party of the Atlantic	PDA	2,306	0.19%	0
Left Revolutionary Front	FER	2,282	0.19%	0
Valid votes		1,206,725	100.00%	50
Blank votes		11,686	0.95%	
Rejected votes – other		10,882	0.89%	
Total polled		1,229,293	68.42%	
Registered electors		1,796,763		

The following candidates were elected: Domingos Abrantes (CDU); Correia Afonso (PSD); Diogo Freitas do Amaral (CDS); João Amaral (CDU); Alberto Avelino (PS); Álvaro Barreto (PSD); Leonor Beleza (PSD); Pedro Holstein Campilho (PSD); António Capucho (PSD); António Lopes Cardoso (PS); Rui Carp (PSD); Carlos Carvalhas (CDU); Isabel Castro (CDU); Pedro Passos Coelho (PSD); António Costa (PS); Leonor Coutinho (PS); João Cravinho (PS); Jorge Roque Cunha (PSD); Rui Cunha (PS); Edite Estrela (PS); Jaime Gama (PS); Teresa Patrício de Gouveia (PSD); José Vera Jardim (PS); Marques Júnior (PS); Sousa Lara (PSD); Manuela Ferreira Leite (PSD); Pedro Santana Lopes (PSD); Mário Montalvão Machado (PSD); Rui Machete (PSD); José Magalhães (PS); Fernandes Marques (PSD); Rogério Martins (PS); João Matos (PSD); Vasco Miguel (PSD); Adriano Moreira (CDS); Luís David Nobre (PSD); Conceição Castro Pereira (PSD); Pedro Pinto (PSD); João Proença (PS); Raul Rego (PS); Eduardo Ferro Rodrigues (PS); Pedro Roseta (PSD); Rui Salvada (PSD); Jorge Sampaio (PS); Arménio Santos (PSD); Manuel Sérgio (PSN); Aníbal Cavaco Silva (PSD); Jerónimo de Sousa (CDU); Mário Tomé (CDU); and Motta Veiga (PSD).

==== 1980s ====
===== 1987 =====
Results of the 1987 legislative election held on 19 July 1987:

Party		Votes	%	Seats
Social Democratic Party	PSD	564,553	46.60%	28
Socialist Party	PS	261,129	21.56%	12
Unitary Democratic Coalition	CDU	203,263	16.78%	10
Democratic Renewal Party	PRD	84,433	6.97%	4
Social Democratic Centre Party	CDS	45,465	3.75%	2
Popular Democratic Union	UDP	17,617	1.45%	0
Portuguese Democratic Movement	MDP	8,945	0.74%	0
Revolutionary Socialist Party	PSR	7,072	0.58%	0
People's Monarchist Party	PPM	6,337	0.52%	0
Portuguese Workers' Communist Party	PCTP	5,622	0.46%	0
Christian Democratic Party	PDC	5,033	0.42%	0
Workers' Party of Socialist Unity	POUS	1,922	0.16%	0
Valid votes		1,211,391	100.00%	56
Blank votes		9,492	0.77%	
Rejected votes – other		11,255	0.91%	
Total polled		1,232,138	73.49%	
Registered electors		1,676,580		

The following candidates were elected: Correia Afonso (PSD); Leonardo Ribeiro de Almeida (PSD); João Amaral (CDU); Luísa Amorim (CDU); Anselmo Aníbal (CDU); António Barreto (PS); Nuno Brederode (PS); Pedro Holstein Campilho (PSD); Mário Sottomayor Cardia (PS); Rui Carp (PSD); Carlos Carvalhas (CDU); Margarida Borges de Carvalho (PSD); José Manuel Casqueiro (PSD); Carlos Coelho (PSD); Vítor Constâncio (PS); Natália Correia (PRD); Manuel Soares Costa (PSD); João Cravinho (PS); Álvaro Cunhal (CDU); António Ramalho Eanes (PRD); Vasco da Gama Fernandes (PRD); João Corregedor da Fonseca (CDU); Carlos Corrêa Gago (PRD); Jaime Gama (PS); Teresa Santa Clara Gomes (PS); Teresa Patrício de Gouveia (PSD); Afonso Moura Guedes (PSD); Sousa Lara (PSD); Pedro Santana Lopes (PSD); Rui Machete (PSD); João Matos (PSD); Rui Almeida Mendes (PSD); Vasco Miguel (PSD); Manuel Tito de Morais (PS); Adriano Moreira (CDS); Rogério Moreira (CDU); Octávio Pato (CDU); António Maria Pereira (PSD); Conceição Castro Pereira (PSD); José Pacheco Pereira (PSD); Pedro Pinto (PSD); Francisco Lucas Pires (CDS); Herculano Pombo (CDU); João Proença (PS); José Luís Ramos (PSD); Raul Rego (PS); João Salgado (PSD); Rui Salvada (PSD); Arménio Santos (PSD); Álvaro Neves da Silva (PS); Aníbal Cavaco Silva (PSD); Francisco Bernardino Silva (PSD); Rui Gomes da Silva (PSD); João Soares (PS); Jerónimo de Sousa (CDU); and Motta Veiga (PSD).

===== 1985 =====
Results of the 1985 legislative election held on 6 October 1985:

Party		Votes	%	Seats
Social Democratic Party	PSD	329,783	26.12%	15
Democratic Renewal Party	PRD	273,685	21.68%	13
United People Alliance	APU	258,808	20.50%	12
Socialist Party	PS	255,030	20.20%	12
Social Democratic Centre Party	CDS	104,010	8.24%	4
Popular Democratic Union	UDP	20,758	1.64%	0
Revolutionary Socialist Party	PSR	7,200	0.57%	0
Christian Democratic Party	PDC	6,597	0.52%	0
Portuguese Workers' Communist Party	PCTP	3,731	0.30%	0
Workers' Party of Socialist Unity	POUS	2,746	0.22%	0
Valid votes		1,262,348	100.00%	56
Blank votes		9,797	0.76%	
Rejected votes – other		15,966	1.24%	
Total polled		1,288,111	77.52%	
Registered electors		1,661,690		

The following candidates were elected: Nuno Abecasis (CDS); Correia Afonso (PSD); Cristina Albuquerque (PRD); João Amaral (APU); Anselmo Aníbal (APU); Luís Beiroco (CDS); Francisco Pinto Balsemão (PSD); Alfredo Barroso (PS); José Manuel Barroso (PSD); Jorge Campinos (PS); Mário Sottomayor Cardia (PS); António Lopes Cardoso (PS); Rui Carp (PSD); Carlos Carvalhas (APU); Carlos Coelho (PSD); Narana Coissoró (CDS); Rui Oliveira e Costa (PSD); Torres Couto (PS); Álvaro Cunhal (APU); Vasco da Gama Fernandes (PRD); José Medeiros Ferreira (PRD); João Corregedor da Fonseca (APU); Carlos Corrêa Gago (PRD); Jaime Gama (PS); Afonso Moura Guedes (PSD); António Janeiro (PS); Alexandre Leite (PRD); Jorge Lemos (APU); Carlos Lilaia (PRD); Pedro Santana Lopes (PSD); Machado Lourenço (PSD); Jorge Liz (PRD); Rui Machete (PSD); Vasco Marques (PRD); Carlos Narciso Martins (PRD); Rui Mateus (PS); Rui Almeida Mendes (PSD); Manuel Tito de Morais (PS); Rogério Moreira (APU); Joaquim Magalhães Mota (PRD); Maria Alda Nogueira (APU); Octávio Pato (APU); Ivo Pinho (PRD); Pedro Pinto (PSD); Francisco Lucas Pires (CDS); José Luís Ramos (PSD); Walter Rosa (PS); Arménio Santos (PSD); Maria Amélia Santos (APU); Teófilo Carvalho dos Santos (PS); Aníbal Cavaco Silva (PSD); Manuel Silvestre (PRD); Mário Soares (PS); Jerónimo de Sousa (APU); José Tengarrinha (APU); and José Vasconcelos (PRD).

===== 1983 =====
Results of the 1983 legislative election held on 25 April 1983:

Party		Votes	%	Seats
Socialist Party	PS	453,116	36.49%	21
United People Alliance	APU	320,066	25.78%	15
Social Democratic Party	PSD	276,660	22.28%	13
Social Democratic Centre Party	CDS	148,379	11.95%	7
Popular Democratic Union and Revolutionary Socialist Party	UDP-PSR	15,940	1.28%	0
Christian Democratic Party	PDC	6,983	0.56%	0
People's Monarchist Party	PPM	6,865	0.55%	0
Portuguese Workers' Communist Party	PCTP	5,736	0.46%	0
Workers' Party of Socialist Unity	POUS	2,812	0.23%	0
Democratic Party of the Atlantic	PDA	2,537	0.20%	0
Socialist Workers League	LST	1,581	0.13%	0
Portuguese Marxist–Leninist Communist Organization	OCMLP	1,014	0.08%	0
Valid votes		1,241,689	100.00%	56
Blank votes		9,818	0.77%	
Rejected votes – other		16,090	1.27%	
Total polled		1,267,597	80.67%	
Registered electors		1,571,281		

The following candidates were elected: Nuno Abecasis (CDS); Correia Afonso (PSD); João Amaral (APU); Anselmo Aníbal (APU); Alberto Avelino (PS); Alfredo Barroso (PS); Luís Beiroco (CDS); Leonor Beleza (PSD); António Capucho (PSD); Mário Sottomayor Cardia (PS); António Lopes Cardoso (PS); Carlos Carvalhas (APU); Joaquim Catanho (PS); Narana Coissoró (CDS); Rui Oliveira e Costa (PSD); Torres Couto (PS); Rodolfo Crespo (PS); Álvaro Cunhal (APU); Marcelo Curto (PS); Georgette Ferreira (APU); Odete Filipe (APU); Jaime Gama (PS); António Azevedo Gomes (PS); João Joaquim Gomes (PS); António Graça (APU); Afonso Moura Guedes (PSD); António Janeiro (PS); José Judas (APU); João Morais Leitão (CDS); Jorge Lemos (APU); Manuel Lopes (APU); Pedro Santana Lopes (PSD); Helena Torres Marques (PS); Margarida Marques (PS); Rogério Martins (PSD); Rui Mateus (PS); Rui Almeida Mendes (PSD); Manuel Tito de Morais (PS); Joaquim Magalhães Mota (PS); Maria Alda Nogueira (APU); Álvaro Oliveira (APU); Octávio Pato (APU); Gomes de Pinho (CDS); Pedro Pinto (PSD); Francisco Lucas Pires (CDS); Leonel Santa Rita (PSD); Walter Rosa (PS); Margarida Salema (PSD); Arménio Santos (PSD); Nuno Rodrigues dos Santos (PSD); Teófilo Carvalho dos Santos (PS); Alfredo Azevedo Soares (CDS); Mário Soares (PS); António Rebelo de Sousa (PS); Jerónimo de Sousa (APU); and José Tengarrinha (APU).

===== 1980 =====
Results of the 1980 legislative election held on 5 October 1980:

Party		Votes	%	Seats
Democratic Alliance	AD	548,892	42.31%	25
Republican and Socialist Front	FRS	370,412	28.55%	17
United People Alliance	APU	304,693	23.48%	13
Popular Democratic Union	UDP	22,935	1.77%	1
Revolutionary Socialist Party	PSR	17,416	1.34%	0
Workers' Party of Socialist Unity	POUS	12,200	0.94%	0
Portuguese Workers' Communist Party	PCTP	7,945	0.61%	0
Labour Party	PT	7,347	0.57%	0
Christian Democratic Party, Independent Movement for the National Reconstruction / Party of the Portuguese Right and National Front	PDC- MIRN/ PDP- FN	3,818	0.29%	0
Democratic Party of the Atlantic	PDA	1,801	0.14%	0
Valid votes		1,297,459	100.00%	56
Blank votes		6,135	0.46%	
Rejected votes – other		16,730	1.27%	
Total polled		1,320,324	86.44%	
Registered electors		1,527,416		

The following candidates were elected: Nuno Abecasis (AD); Augusto Ferreira do Amaral (AD); Diogo Freitas do Amaral (AD); Maria Teresa Ambrósio (FRS); Anselmo Aníbal (APU); Luís Beiroco (AD); António Cabecinha (AD); António Capucho (AD); António Lopes Cardoso (FRS); Carvalho Cardoso (AD); Francisco Sá Carneiro (AD); Alberto Arons de Carvalho (FRS); Vilhena de Carvalho (FRS); José Ribeiro e Castro (AD); Joaquim Catanho (FRS); Narana Coissoró (AD); Vítor Constâncio (FRS); Natália Correia (AD); João Cravinho (FRS); Álvaro Cunhal (APU); Marcelo Curto (FRS); Georgette Ferreira (APU); António de Sousa Franco (FRS); António Patrício Gouveia (AD); Afonso Moura Guedes (AD); Carlos Aboim Inglez (APU); António Janeiro (FRS); José Judas (APU); João Morais Leitão (AD); Manuel Lopes (APU); Teresa Costa Macedo (AD); Aquilino Ribeiro Machado (FRS); Rui Mateus (FRS); Manuel Tito de Morais (FRS); Maria Alda Nogueira (APU); Álvaro Oliveira (APU); Maria Adelaide Paiva (AD); Octávio Pato (APU); Luís Patrão (FRS); José Menéres Pimentel (AD); Emídio Pinheiro (AD); Hélder Simão Pinheiro (APU); Nascimento Rodrigues (AD); Jorge Sampaio (FRS); Arménio Santos (AD); Nuno Rodrigues dos Santos (AD); Teófilo Carvalho dos Santos (FRS); Zita Seabra (APU); Aníbal Cavaco Silva (AD); Alfredo Azevedo Soares (AD); Mário Soares (FRS); Jerónimo de Sousa (APU); José Tengarrinha (APU); Gonçalo Ribeiro Telles (AD); Mário Tomé (UDP); and Pedro Vasconcelos (AD).

==== 1970s ====
===== 1979 =====
Results of the 1979 legislative election held on 2 December 1979:

Party		Votes	%	Seats
Democratic Alliance	AD	523,583	40.71%	24
United People Alliance	APU	341,658	26.56%	16
Socialist Party	PS	339,032	26.36%	15
Popular Democratic Union	UDP	36,388	2.83%	1
Christian Democratic Party	PDC	12,027	0.94%	0
Left-wing Union for the Socialist Democracy	UEDS	11,809	0.92%	0
Portuguese Workers' Communist Party	PCTP	11,716	0.91%	0
Revolutionary Socialist Party	PSR	5,144	0.40%	0
Workers' Party of Socialist Unity	POUS	4,810	0.37%	0
Valid votes		1,286,167	100.00%	56
Blank votes		9,130	0.70%	
Rejected votes – other		18,075	1.38%	
Total polled		1,313,372	87.84%	
Registered electors		1,495,234		

The following candidates were elected: Nuno Abecasis (AD); Diogo Freitas do Amaral (AD); João Amaral (APU); Maria Teresa Ambrósio (PS); Gualter Basílio (PS); Luís Beiroco (AD); Carlos Brito (APU); António Cabecinha (AD); Francisco Igrejas Caeiro (PS); António Martins Canaverde (AD); Carvalho Cardoso (AD); Francisco Sá Carneiro (AD); Carlos Carvalhas (APU); Alberto Arons de Carvalho (PS); Joaquim Catanho (PS); Narana Coissoró (AD); Vítor Constâncio (PS); Natália Correia (AD); Rodolfo Crespo (PS); Victor Pinto da Cruz (AD); Álvaro Cunhal (APU); Marcelo Curto (PS); Cardoso Ferreira (AD); Francisco Cavaleiro Ferreira (AD); Medeiros Ferreira (AD); João Joaquim Gomes (PS); António Patrício Gouveia (AD); Afonso Moura Guedes (AD); Carlos Aboim Inglez (APU); Emílio Leitão (AD); José Leitão (PS); Jorge Lemos (APU); Aquilino Ribeiro Machado (PS); Maria Alda Nogueira (APU); Álvaro Oliveira (APU); José Sanches Osório (AD); Maria Adelaide Paiva (AD); Octávio Pato (APU); Edmundo Pedro (PS); António Pedrosa (APU); José Menéres Pimentel (AD); Hélder Simão Pinheiro (APU); Rosa Brandão Represas (APU); Nascimento Rodrigues (AD); Jorge Sampaio (PS); Arménio Santos (AD); Nuno Rodrigues dos Santos (AD); Teófilo Carvalho dos Santos (PS); Zita Seabra (APU); José Veríssimo Silva (APU); Mário Soares (PS); Jerónimo de Sousa (APU); Gonçalo Ribeiro Telles (AD); José Tengarrinha (APU); Mário Tomé (UDP); and Pedro Vasconcelos (AD).

===== 1976 =====
Results of the 1976 legislative election held on 25 April 1976:

Party		Votes	%	Seats
Socialist Party	PS	458,713	39.66%	25
Portuguese Communist Party	PCP	260,554	22.53%	14
Democratic People's Party	PPD	196,031	16.95%	10
Social Democratic Centre Party	CDS	157,554	13.62%	8
Popular Democratic Union	UDP	31,409	2.72%	1
Re-Organized Movement of the Party of the Proletariat	MRPP	14,372	1.24%	0
People's Socialist Front	FSP	8,192	0.71%	0
Movement of Socialist Left	MES	7,964	0.69%	0
Communist Party of Portugal (Marxist–Leninist)	PCP(ML)	5,289	0.46%	0
People's Monarchist Party	PPM	4,902	0.42%	0
Christian Democratic Party	PDC	4,348	0.38%	0
Internationalist Communist League	LCI	2,865	0.25%	0
Worker–Peasant Alliance	AOC	2,832	0.24%	0
Workers' Revolutionary Party	PRT	1,580	0.14%	0
Valid votes		1,156,605	100.00%	58
Rejected votes		41,184	3.44%	
Total polled		1,197,789	83.66%	
Registered electors		1,431,819		

The following candidates were elected: Nuno Abecasis (CDS); Diogo Freitas do Amaral (CDS); Acácio Barreiros (UDP); Carlos Brito (PCP); José de Melo Torres Campos (PS); Mário Sottomayor Cardia (PS); Carvalho Cardoso (CDS); Carlos Carvalhas (PCP); Alberto Arons de Carvalho (PS); Nandim de Carvalho (PPD); Delmiro Carreira (PS); Joaquim Catanho (PS); Narana Coissoró (CDS); Vítor Constâncio (PS); Victor Pinto da Cruz (CDS); Álvaro Cunhal (PCP); Marcelo Curto (PS); Herlander Estrela (PS); Severiano Falcão (PCP); Georgette Ferreira (PCP); Medeiros Ferreira (PS); António de Sousa Franco (PPD); João Joaquim Gomes (PS); Manuel Gonçalves (PCP); Afonso Moura Guedes (PPD); Carlos Aboim Inglez (PCP); Artur Videira Leal (PPD); José Leitão (PS); Fernando Loureiro (PS); João Louro (PS); Aquilino Ribeiro Machado (PS); José Alves Magro (PCP); Nuno Maria Matos (PS); Manuel Carmo Mendes (PS); Mário Mesquita (PS); Carlos Costa Moreira (PS); Vital Moreira (PCP); Joaquim Magalhães Mota (PPD); Francisco Assis Neto (PS); Carlos Andrade Neves (PS); Florival Nobre (PS); Maria Alda Nogueira (PCP); Álvaro Oliveira (PCP); Edmundo Pedro (PS); Carmelinda Pereira (PS); José Macedo Pereira (CDS); José Menéres Pimentel (PPD); Emídio Pinheiro (CDS); Mário Campos Pinto (PPD); Carlos Robalo (CDS); Helena Roseta (PPD); Nuno Rodrigues dos Santos (PPD); Victor Benito Silva (PCP); Sérgio Simões (PS); Mário Soares (PS); José Pedro Soares (PCP); António Rebelo de Sousa (PPD); and Jerónimo de Sousa (PCP).
