= Duarte Alves =

Portuguese politician (born 1991)

Member of the Assembly of the Republic
- In office 8 November 2022 – 25 March 2024
- Preceded by: Jerónimo de Sousa
- Constituency: Lisbon
- In office 15 September 2018 – 28 March 2022
- Preceded by: Miguel Tiago
- Constituency: Lisbon

Personal details
- Born: Duarte Le Falher de Campos Alves; 6 January 1991 (age 35) Lisbon, Portugal
- Party: Portuguese Communist Party
- Other political affiliations: Unitary Democratic Coalition
- Education: University of Lisbon

Duarte Le Falher de Campos Alves (born 6 January 1991) is a Portuguese politician and former member of the Assembly of the Republic, the national legislature of Portugal. A communist, he represented Lisbon from September 2018 to March 2022 and from November 2022 to March 2024.

== Early life ==
Alves was born on 6 January 1991 in Lisbon. He has a degree in economics from the University of Lisbon's Higher Institute of Economics and Management (ISEG) and a master's degree in economics and public policy.

== Career ==
Alves is an economist by profession. He was a member of the national board of the Portuguese Communist Youth (JCP) from 2010 to 2017. He then worked for the Portuguese Communist Party (PCP) and served as an advisor to its parliamentary group from 2017 to 2018 and in 2022.

At the 2015 legislative election Alves was placed tenth in the Unitary Democratic Coalition (CDU)'s list of candidates in Lisbon but the alliance only won five seats in the constituency. He was appointed to the Assembly of the Republic as permanent member in September 2018 following the resignation of Miguel Tiago. He was re-elected at the 2019 legislative election. At the 2022 legislative election Alves was placed third in the CDU's list of candidates in Lisbon but the alliance only won two seats in the constituency. He was appointed to the Assembly as permanent member in November 2022 following the resignation of Jerónimo de Sousa. At the 2024 legislative election Alves was placed fifth in the CDU's list of candidates in Lisbon but the alliance only won two seats in the constituency.

== Electoral history ==
Electoral history of Duarte Alves
Election	Constituency	Party	Alliance	No.	Result
2015 legislative	Lisbon	Portuguese Communist Party	Unitary Democratic Coalition	10	Not elected
2019 legislative	Lisbon	Portuguese Communist Party	Unitary Democratic Coalition	3	Elected
2022 legislative	Lisbon	Portuguese Communist Party	Unitary Democratic Coalition	3	Not elected
2024 legislative	Lisbon	Portuguese Communist Party	Unitary Democratic Coalition	5	Not elected
