= Rui Gomes da Silva (politician) =

Portuguese lawyer and politician (born 1958)

Shadow Minister of Justice
- Incumbent
- Assumed office 19 September 2025
- Leader: André Ventura
- Preceded by: Office established

Minister in the Cabinet of the Prime Minister
- In office 24 November 2004 – 12 March 2005
- Prime Minister: Pedro Santana Lopes
- Preceded by: Henrique Chaves
- Succeeded by: Office abolished

Minister of Parliamentary Affairs
- In office 17 July 2004 – 24 November 2004
- Prime Minister: Pedro Santana Lopes
- Preceded by: Luís Marques Mendes
- Succeeded by: Augusto Santos Silva

Member of the Assembly of the Republic
- In office 19 July 1987 – 14 October 2009
- Constituency: Lisbon

Personal details
- Born: Rui Manuel Lobo Gomes da Silva; 23 August 1958 (age 68) Rio Tinto, Gondomar, Portugal
- Party: CH (since 2025)
- Other political affiliations: PPD/PSD (1976–2025)
- Relatives: André Ventura (godson)
- Education: University of Lisbon
- Occupation: Lawyer • Professor • Politician

Rui Manuel Lobo Gomes da Silva (born 23 August 1958) is a Portuguese lawyer, politician and former Minister of Parliamentary Affairs in the XVI Constitutional Government. He currently serves as Shadow Minister of Justice in the Shadow Cabinet of André Ventura.
