= Teresa Costa Macedo =

Portuguese politician (1943–2025)

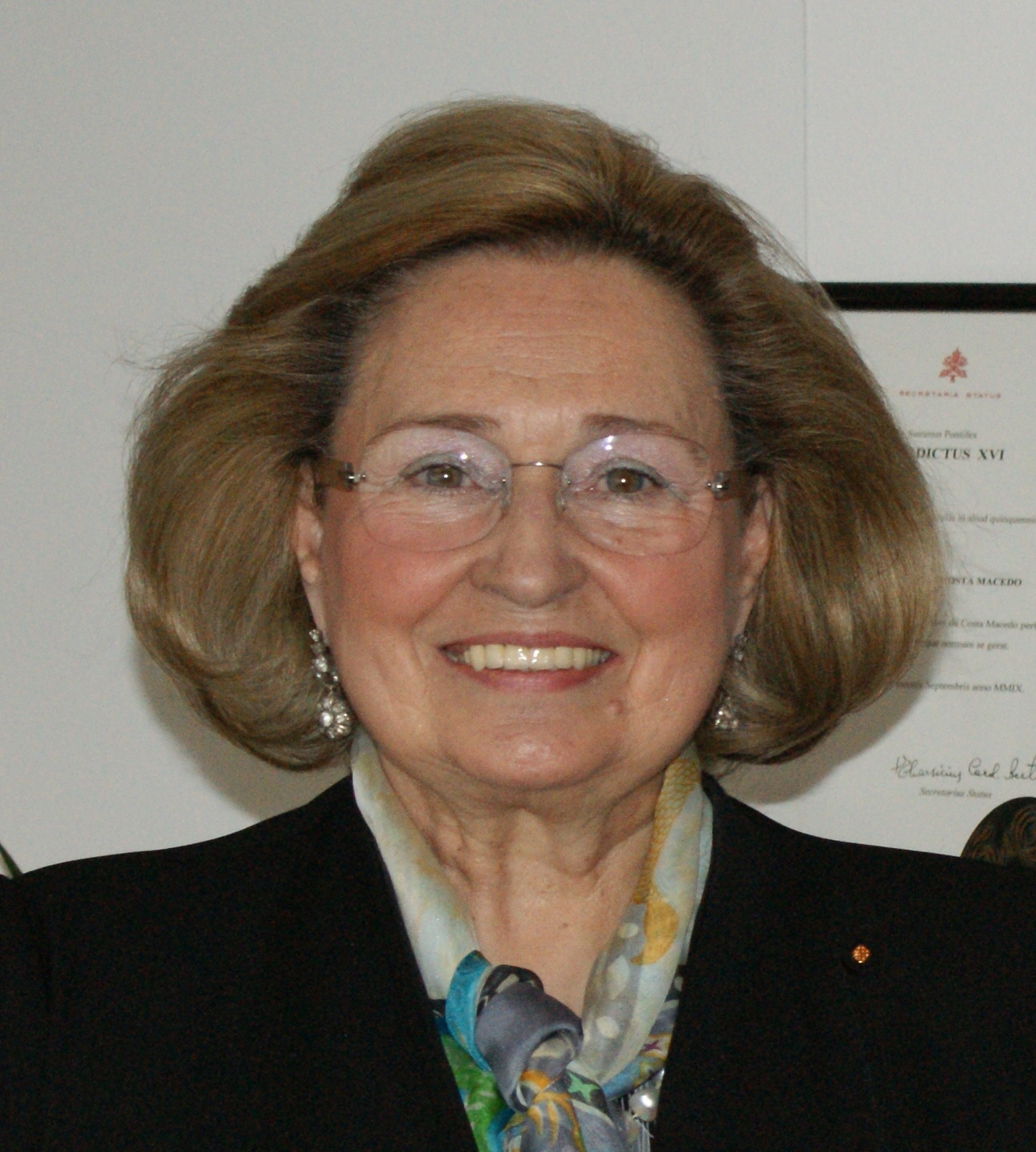
- Macedo in 2014

Member of the Assembly of the Republic of Portugal for Lisbon
- In office 9 January 1981 – 8 September 1981

Personal details
- Born: Maria Teresa Paulo Sampaio da Costa Macedo; 19 January 1943 Anadia, Portugal
- Died: 15 May 2025 (aged 82) Lisbon, Portugal
- Party: CDS – People's Party
- Occupation: Academic

Maria Teresa Paulo Sampaio da Costa Macedo (19 January 1943 – 15 May 2025) was a Portuguese politician who was a member of the CDS – People's Party, she served in the Assembly of the Republic from January to September 1981.

Macedo was the daughter of naturalist painter Fausto Sampaio. She died in Lisbon on 15 May 2025, at the age of 82.
