= Ana Bernardo (politician) =

Portuguese politician and trade unionist (born 1968)

Ana Paula Mata Bernardo

Member of the Assembly of the Republic
- Incumbent
- Assumed office 2022
- Constituency: Lisbon

Personal details
- Born: 20 October 1968 (age 57) Pau, France
- Party: Portuguese: Socialist Party (PS)
- Occupation: Trade union leader and politician

Ana Paula Mata Bernardo (born 1968) is a Portuguese trade unionist and politician. As a member of the Portuguese Socialist Party (PS), she was elected as a deputy in the Portuguese Assembly of the Republic in January 2022, representing the Porto constituency, and was re-elected in 2024 and 2025 to represent the Lisbon constituency.

== Early life and education ==
Bernardo was born in Pau, France on 20 October 1968. When she was eight her family returned to Portugal and lived in Belmonte in the Castelo Branco district. She studied there until her final year in secondary school, which she took in Lisbon. She then studied for an undergraduate degree in economics in Lisbon.

== Career ==
In 1991, Bernardo began working for UGT, the umbrella trade union organization in Portugal. In 2022 she was deputy general secretary of the union. In 2016 she was appointed as a consultant to the president, Marcelo Rebelo de Sousa, a position she held until 2022. She then left both positions, having been elected in 2022 as a deputy in the Assembly of the Republic, representing the Porto constituency as a member of the Socialist Party (PS), which won an overall majority in that election. She served as vice-president of the committee on Labour, Social Security and Inclusion in the assembly. Following allegations of corruption against some members of the government in 2023, and the resignation of the prime minister, António Costa, the president called for new elections. In the 2024 election, Bernardo switched constituencies and was tenth on the list of PS candidate for the Lisbon constituency, with the party winning 15 seats.

During the 15th Legislature of the Third Portuguese Republic (2022–2024), Bernardo was appointed as the rapporteur of a parliamentary commission of inquiry into the Portuguese national airline, TAP Air Portugal, which had the specific task of looking at whether there was any political interference in the management of the airline. She was reluctant to take on the task because she knew that it would put her in the spotlight and, according to her colleagues, she has a very shy nature. The report was heavily criticised, although according to her it was designed to be a first draft to promote subsequent dialogue.
