= Ana Sofia Antunes =

Portuguese politician

Secretary of State for the Inclusion of Persons with Disabilities
- In office 26 November 2015 – 2 April 2024
- Prime Minister: António Costa
- Minister: José António Vieira da Silva; Ana Mendes Godinho

Member of the Assembly of the Republic
- In office 2 April 2024 – 4 June 2025
- Constituency: Leiria

Member of the Arganil Municipal Assembly
- In office 1 October 2017 – 26 September 2021

Member of the Lisbon Municipal Assembly
- In office 11 October 2009 – 29 September 2013

Personal details
- Born: Ana Sofia Pedroso Lopes Antunes; 11 August 1981 (age 45) Lisbon, Portugal
- Party: Socialist Party (since 2009)
- Children: 1
- Education: University of Lisbon
- Occupation: Lawyer • Activist • Politician

Ana Sofia Pedroso Lopes Antunes (born 11 August 1981) is a Portuguese politician who, from 2015 to 2024, held the government position of Secretary of State for the Inclusion of Persons with Disabilities. Antunes was born blind.

== Early life and education ==
Ana Sofia Pedroso Lopes Antunes was born in Lisbon, capital of Portugal, in 1981. She grew up in the parish of Corroios in the municipality of Seixal, south of Lisbon. Antunes was congenitally blind at birth. She obtained a degree in law from the Faculty of Law of the University of Lisbon.

== Career ==
After an internship, Antunes was admitted to the Portuguese Bar Association. After one year with a legal firm, she was invited in 2007 to work at Lisbon City Council as legal advisor to the councillor for mobility, a position she held until 2013. In 2010 she worked on the Lisbon Pedestrian Accessibility Plan. In 2013 she moved to the Lisbon Municipal Mobility and Parking Company (EMEL). Between 2013 and 2015 she held the position of president of the Association of the Blind and Visually Impaired of Portugal (ACAPO). She was also a member of the board of the European Blind Union.

== Political career ==
In the 2015 Portuguese legislative election Antunes was a candidate on the list of the Portuguese Socialist Party (PS) for Lisbon, to become a deputy in the Assembly of the Republic. Nineteenth on the list, it was thought likely that she would be elected, but the PS only succeeded in winning 18 seats. Instead, she was appointed by the prime minister, António Costa, to be the Secretary of State for the Inclusion of Persons with Disabilities. She was elected in the 2019 election but was retained in the position as Secretary of State. In the 2022 election, when the PS won an overall majority, Antunes was 14th on the PS list for Lisbon and was easily elected, as the PS won 21 seats. She was again appointed as Secretary of State for Inclusion. In the March 2024 election, after which the PS ceased to form the government, she was elected to the National Assembly as a PS representative in the Leiria constituency.

== Personal life ==
In December 2018 Antunes had a daughter. Her partner, and the daughter's father, is also blind.
