= Isabel Galriça Neto =

Portuguese politician and doctor

Isabel Galriça Neto ComM

Member of the Assembly of the Republic
- In office 26 October 2009 – 25 October 2019
- Constituency: Lisbon

Member of the Lisbon Municipal Assembly
- Incumbent
- Assumed office 18 October 2021

Personal details
- Born: Isabel Maria Mousinho de Almeida Galriça; 10 July 1961 (age 65) Lisbon, Portugal
- Party: CDS – People's Party (2007–present)
- Spouse: Jorge Nuno Neto
- Children: 3
- Education: University of Lisbon
- Occupation: Doctor • Politician

Isabel Maria Mousinho de Almeida Galriça Neto (born 10 July 1961) is a Portuguese doctor, author and politician. She has been a pioneer in the use of palliative care in Portugal and is one of the main voices in the country against abortion and euthanasia. Between 2009 and 2019 she served as a member of the Assembly of the Republic, for the conservative CDS – People's Party (CDS-PP).

== Medical career ==
Isabel Maria Mousinho de Almeida Galriça Neto was born on 10 July 1961. She obtained a degree in medicine from the Faculty of Medicine of the University of Lisbon and subsequently graduated as a specialist in general and family medicine in 1991. She has a master's degree in palliative care and in 1997 founded the continuing care team at the Odivelas Health Centre in Lisbon. In 2006 Neto moved to the Hospital da Luz in Benfica, Lisbon, where she became the coordinator of the continuing and palliative care team.

Neto is a member of the oncology commission of the Hospital da Luz and a member of the palliative care nucleus of the Bioethics Centre of the Faculty of Medicine of the University of Lisbon. She teaches pharmacology and palliative care at the same faculty and is a guest teacher at the Catholic University of Portugal. She was the founder of the Portuguese Palliative Care Association and its president between 2006 and 2012.

== Political life ==
As a result of the prominence Neto gained in her campaign against proposals for the decriminalization of abortion in 2007, the then president of the CDS-PP, Paulo Portas, asked her to help define his party's policies regarding issues such as palliative care, assisted death and living wills. He then invited her to run as an independent on the party's list in the 2009 national legislative elections, for the Lisbon constituency. She joined the party in 2011 and was re-elected in that year and, again, in 2015. She ran for the same constituency for the 2019 legislative elections, but was not elected. During her time in parliament, she continued with her medical activities. In parliament, Neto served on the Education and Science Commissions. She coordinated the CDS-PP parliamentary group on Health, HIV/AIDS and Hepatitis, and various groups relating to oncological issues. Neto was known as the "piercing deputy" as she wears a decoration in her nose.

== Awards and decorations ==
- In 2004, Neto was made Commander of the Portuguese Order of Merit

== Publications ==
- 2004. Isabel Galriça Neto, Helena H. Aitken and Tsering Paldron. A Dignidade e o Sentido da Vida: Uma Reflexão sobre a Nossa Existência (Dignity and the Meaning of Life. A Reflection on Our Existence). Alêtheia Editores. ISBN 978-972-711-645-4
- 2010. Galriça Neto, Isabel. Cuidados Paliativos. Testemunhos (Palliative care. Testimonials). Alêtheia Editores. ISBN 978-989-622-298-7
- 2016. Galriça Neto, Isabel. Eutanásia? Cuidados Paliativos (Euthanasia? Palliative care). Pergaminho. ISBN 978-989-622-815-6
