= Edmundo Pedro =

Portuguese politician and antifascist (1918–2018)

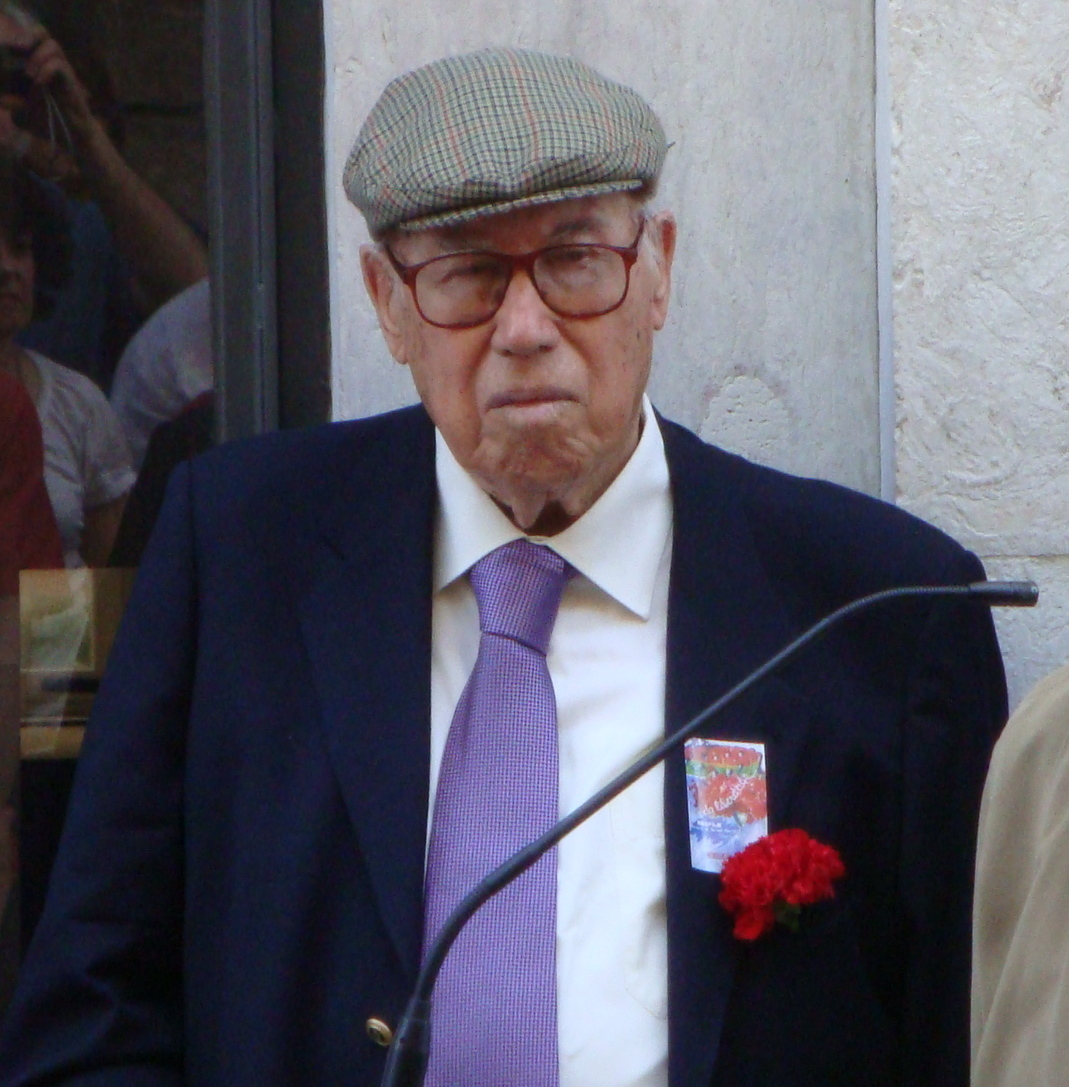
Edmundo Pedro in 2010.

Edmundo Pedro (8 November 1918 – 27 January 2018) was a Portuguese politician and antifascist, as well as the founder and former leader of the Socialist Party (PS). An opponent of António de Oliveira Salazar's Estado Novo regime and political prisoner during the 1930s and 1940s, Pedro later served as a member of the Assembly of the Republic's I, III and V legislatures (1976–1980, 1983–1985, 1987–1991) following the end of Salazar's regime.

== Biography ==
Pedro was born in the freguesia of Samouco in the municipality of Alcochete, Portugal, on 8 November 1918. In 1934, Pedro, who was 15-years old, was arrested for the first time for participating in a general strike. He joined the Portuguese Communist Party (PCP) later in the 1930s, where he met the party's leader, Álvaro Cunhal. In 1936, Edmundo Pedro was arrested again and sent to the Tarrafal prison camp in Cape Verde alongside his father, Gabriel Pedro, another opponent of the Salazar government.

In 1945, while still in prison, Pedro broke with the PCP and left the party. He was released from Tarrafal in 1946 and returned to mainland Portugal.

In 1973, Edmundo Pedro became one of the co-founders of the Socialist Party (PS) alongside Mário Soares. Following the Carnation Revolution, Pedro became an elected deputy in the national Assembly of the Republic.

He simultaneously served as the president of Rádio e Televisão de Portugal (RTP), the national public service broadcaster, from 1977 until 1978.

In January 2018, Pedro was hospitalized for approximately two weeks. He died in Lisbon, Portugal, on 27 January 2018, at the age of 99.
