= João Cravinho =

Portuguese politician (1936–2025)

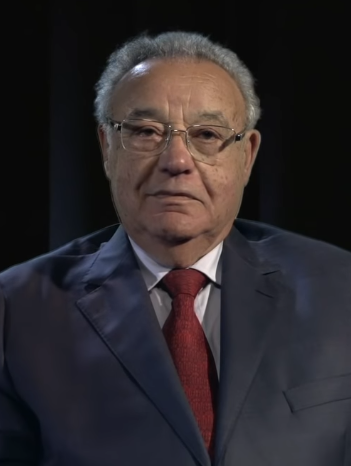
João Cravinho

João Cardona Gomes Cravinho GCC (19 September 1936 – 16 April 2025) was a Portuguese politician. He served, among other positions, as member of the Portuguese Parliament (1979–1983, 1985–1989 and 1999–2002), member of the European Parliament (1989–1994), and as the Portuguese Territory Administration Minister between 1995 and 1999. He was a member of the PS political party. Cravinho had a degree in engineering.

In the 1970s, he was a co-founder of Movimento de Esquerda Socialista (MES).

In 2004, after the eruption of several corruption scandals involving people and institutions ranging from mayors like Fátima Felgueiras to football clubs (Apito Dourado), former Minister João Cravinho noted:

The political system has shown little efficiency in fighting corruption, tax evasion, and fraud. The successive governments did not engage themselves in that fight. Why? Because they want to win the elections… This is a fatal error that we should urgently terminate.

In 2006, as a socialist deputy he was preparing a new set of proposals in order to improve the legal framework of corruption crimes, which included the investigation of someone, when that person's assets don't match his/her declaration of income. The proposal was rejected by the Portuguese Parliament. Shortly after, Cravinho resigned from the parliament and went to England where he had been appointed administrator of the European Bank for Reconstruction and Development by the Portuguese Government headed by socialist José Sócrates.

Cravinho died on 16 April 2025, at the age of 88.

== Distinctions ==
=== National orders ===
- Grand Cross of the Military Order of Christ (8 June 2005)
