= Ricardo Dias Pinto =

Portuguese politician (born 1968)

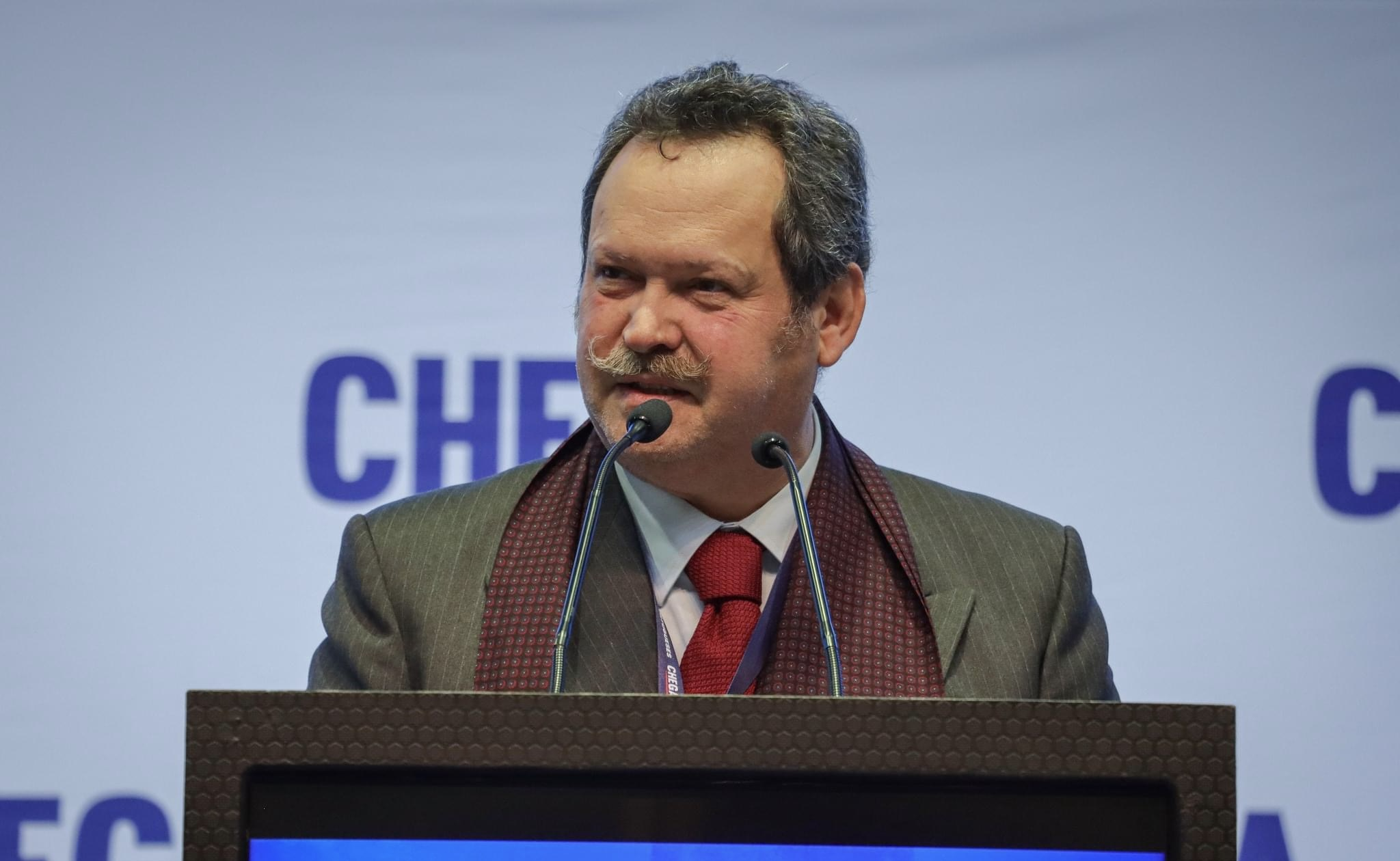

Member of the Assembly of the Republic
- Incumbent
- Assumed office 26 March 2024
- Constituency: Lisbon

Personal details
- Born: Ricardo Dias Pinto Blaufuks; 17 June 1968 (age 58) Lisbon, Portugal
- Party: Chega
- Education: Universidade Lusófona

Ricardo Dias Pinto Blaufuks (born 17 June 1968) also known as Ricardo Regalla is a Portuguese businessman, real-estate consultant and politician of the Chega party currently serving as a member of the Assembly of the Republic for the Lisbon constituency.

== Biography ==
=== Life and career ===
Pinto studied agricultural management at the Universidade Lusófona before working in real-estate in Sintra and Cascais and later founding a consultancy business. He then worked as a chief of staff for Chega leader André Ventura.

=== Politics ===
He was a founding member of Chega and served as a vice-deputy to André Ventura's national leadership. In August 2023, he spoke at the summer camp of the party's youth league at the invitation of Rita Matias. In March 2024, he was elected to the Assembly of the Republic representing the Lisbon constituency.

Pinto supports the restoration of the Portuguese monarchy and did not vote in any of the country's presidential elections until the 2021 Portuguese presidential election to support André Ventura.
