= Madalena Cordeiro =

Portuguese politician (born 2003)

Madalena Simões Cordeiro
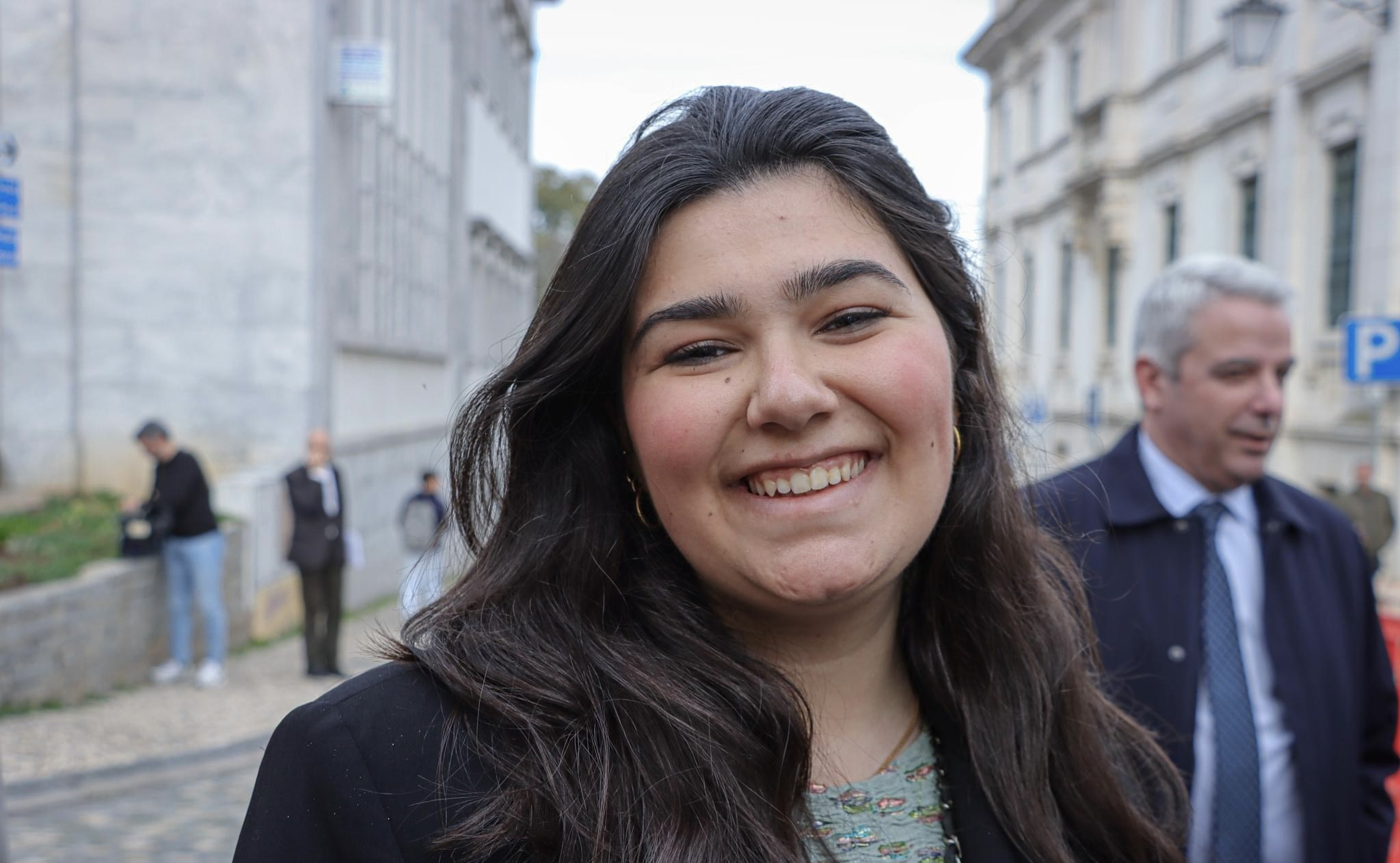

Member of the Assembly of the Republic
- Incumbent
- Assumed office 26 March 2024
- Constituency: Lisbon District

Personal details
- Born: 18 December 2003 (age 22) Vila Viçosa, Portugal
- Party: Portuguese: CHEGA
- Occupation: Politician and student

Madalena Simões Cordeiro (born 18 December 2003) is a Portuguese politician. In the 2024 Portuguese national election she was elected to the Assembly of the Republic as a representative of the right wing CHEGA party, and became the youngest member of the parliament.

== Biography ==
Cordeiro was born on 18 December 2003 in Vila Viçosa in the Evora district in the Alentejo region of Portugal. At the time of her election to the National Assembly in March 2024, she was studying law and politics at the Catholic University of Portugal and was also serving as a member of the national leadership of CHEGA's youth. In the 2024 national election, Cordeiro was eighth on the list of CHEGA candidates for the Lisbon constituency and CHEGA won nine seats. In the parliament, she was appointed to be a member of the European Affairs Committee.
