= Marcos Perestrello =

Portuguese politician

- Perestrello in 2026

President of the NATO Parliamentary Assembly
- Incumbent
- Assumed office 25 November 2024
- Preceded by: Michał Szczerba

Vice President of the Assembly of the Republic
- Incumbent
- Assumed office 27 March 2024
- President: José Pedro Aguiar-Branco

Member of the Assembly of the Republic
- Incumbent
- Assumed office 20 June 2011
- Constituency: Lisbon (2011–2025); Santarém (since 2025)
- In office 10 March 2005 – 15 October 2009
- Constituency: Beja

Secretary of State for National Defence
- In office 26 November 2015 – 17 October 2018
- Prime Minister: António Costa
- Minister: José Alberto Azeredo Lopes

Secretary of State for National Defence and Maritime Affairs
- In office 26 October 2009 – 21 June 2011
- Prime Minister: José Sócrates
- Minister: Augusto Santos Silva

Personal details
- Born: Marcos da Cunha e Lorena Perestrello de Vasconcelos; 23 August 1971 (age 55) Lisbon, Portugal
- Party: Socialist Party
- Education: University of Lisbon
- Occupation: Lawyer • Politician

Marcos da Cunha e Lorena Perestrello de Vasconcelos (born 23 August 1971) is a Portuguese politician. He is currently a member of the Portuguese Parliament and Chairman of the Parliament's National Defense Committee. He was Portuguese Secretary of State for National Defense in António Costa's government and Secretary of State for National Defense and Maritime Affairs in José Sócrates' government.

== Biography ==
He graduated in Law from the Faculty of Law of the University of Lisbon.

He was Assistant to the Minister for Parliamentary Affairs (1999–2000) and Chief of Staff to the Secretary of State for Internal Administration (1995–1999).

In 2001, he founded and took over the management of CIMASA — Centro de Informação, Mediação e Arbitragem de Seguros Automóveis, which brings together representatives of insurance companies, through the Associação Portuguesa de Seguradores, consumers, through DECO, and motorists, through the ACP. He headed this organization until 2007.

In 2004, he was elected a member of the National Secretariat of the PS, a position he resigned in October 2010 to become President of the Lisbon Federation of the same party.

In 2005, he was elected a member of the Portuguese Parliament and vice-chairman of the PS Parliamentary Group, having held parliamentary seats in the X, XII, XIII, XIV and XV legislatures.

In 2007, he was elected as a city councillor and, until 2009, he was deputy mayor of Lisbon. During the 18th Constitutional Government, he became Secretary of State for National Defense and Maritime Affairs, from 2009 to 2011.

In 2015, after being elected as a Member of Parliament, he was also part of the 21st Constitutional Government as Secretary of State for National Defense until 2018, when he resumed his previous duties as a Member of Parliament.
