= Pedro Vaz (Portuguese politician) =

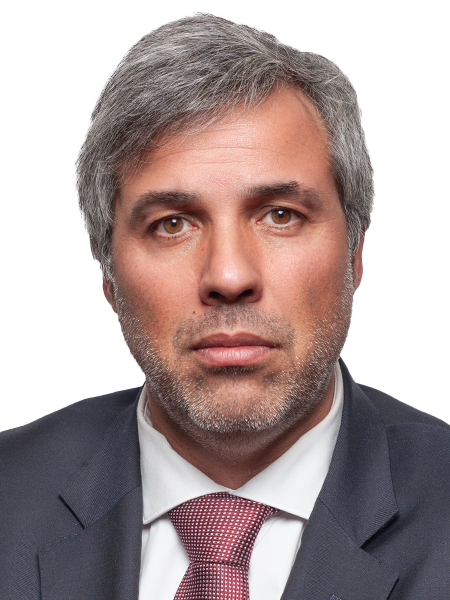
- Official portrait, 2024

Member of the Assembly of the Republic
- Incumbent
- Assumed office 26 March 2024
- Constituency: Lisbon

Personal details
- Born: Pedro Manuel Amaro Martins Vaz; 26 November 1979 (age 46)
- Party: Socialist Party

Pedro Manuel Amaro Martins Vaz (born 22 November 1979) is a Portuguese politician, who is a member of the Assembly of the Republic. He has been a Member of the Portuguese Assembly since the 16th legislature for the Socialist Party.

Vaz is also a member of the National Secretariat of the Socialist Party.
