= Rui Cardoso (politician) =

Portuguese politician (born 2002)

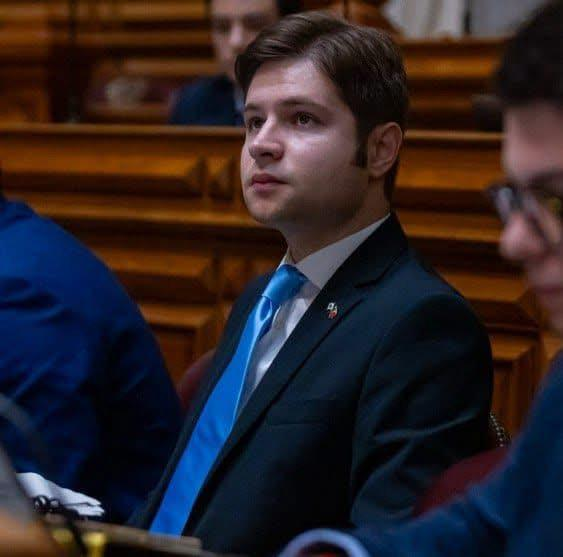
- Cardoso in 2024

Member of the Assembly of the Republic
- Incumbent
- Assumed office 3 June 2025
- Constituency: Lisbon

Personal details
- Born: 11 May 2002 (age 24)
- Party: Chega

Rui Miguel Candeias Cardoso (born 11 May 2002) is a Portuguese politician serving as a member of the Assembly of the Republic since 2025. He previously served as education policy advisor to Chega's parliamentary group.

== Education and career ==
He graduated with a licentiate degree in History from the School of Arts and Humanities of the University of Lisbon and pursued a master's degree in education for lower and upper secondary levels. Before entering parliament, he worked as a history teacher in both lower and upper secondary schools, and served as an advisor to the Chega Parliamentary group within the Committee on Education and Science.

== Member of the Assembly of the Republic ==
=== XVII Legislature of the Portuguese Republic ===
In the 2025 legislative elections, Rui Cardoso was elected as a member of the Assembly of the Republic, running as the 11th candidate on the Chega party list for the Lisbon constituency. Being only 23 years old at the time of the election, he became one of the youngest members of parliament in the country. In an interview with Diário de Notícias, he described the moment of his election as "an incredible emotion," recalling that he had even turned off his mobile phone assuming he would not make it into Parliament, only to be surprised by the call after the final parish of Avenidas Novas had closed its vote count.

During the XVII Legislature, he became prominent in parliamentary debates and public interventions concerning education, higher education, and rural affairs. In April 2026, he participated in a parliamentary debate regarding the removal of works by José Saramago from the compulsory school reading list. He supported their removal, criticizing what he described as ideological politicization in education by previous governments.

In 2026, he was also involved in the debate surrounding inclusive language in higher education. This came after he denounced academic guidelines sent by Nova University Lisbon to its students regarding terms and language styles deemed inappropriate in the name of "inclusion"—a topic that was subsequently analyzed by the fact-checking platform Polígrafo. In May 2026, he was at the center of a tense moment in Parliament during a debate with the Socialist Party (PS) over the state of public schools, during which he stated that the PS had destroyed education in Portugal. Rui Cardoso was also the Chega parliamentary group's designated member responsible for overseeing, drafting, and debating the new Legal Regime for Higher Education Institutions.
