= Walter Rosa =

Portuguese politician, engineer and diplomat (1919–2017)

Walter Ruivo Pinto Gomes Rosa

Member of the Assembly of the Republic
- In office 1976–1979
- In office 1983–1987

Minister of Transport and Communications
- In office 1975–1976

Minister of Industry and Technology
- In office 1976–1977

Member of the European Parliament
- In office 1986–1987
- Constituency: Portugal

Personal details
- Born: 20 November 1919 Lisbon, Portugal
- Died: 2017 (aged 97–98)
- Party: Socialist Party
- Occupation: Politician, engineer, manager, diplomat

Walter Ruivo Pinto Gomes Rosa (20 November 1919 – 2017) was a Portuguese politician, engineer, manager and diplomat. He served as a member of the Assembly of the Republic, Minister of Transport and Communications (1975–1976), Minister of Industry and Technology (1976–1977), and Member of the European Parliament during its II term (1986–1987). He was affiliated with the Socialist Party (PS).

== Life and career ==
Rosa graduated in electrical engineering in Paris. He worked as an engineer in hydroelectric power plants and on hydrotechnical projects. He became managing director of companies in the energy sector and a member of supervisory boards. From 1974 to 1975, he also managed the national railway carrier Caminhos de Ferro Portugueses.

He became involved in politics within the Socialist Party, serving on its political committee and leading the PS parliamentary faction. He also served as mayor of Oeiras. In the 1976–1979 and 1985–1987 terms, he served in the Assembly of the Republic, representing the Leiria and Lisbon districts. He held ministerial positions in the areas of transport and communications (from 19 September 1975, to 6 January 1976) and industry and technology (from 6 January 1976, to 7 January 1977).

Subsequently, he served as the ambassador of Portugal to Caracas (from 1977 to 1981) and Paris (from 1984 to 1985).

From 1 January 1986, to 13 September 1987, he served as a Member of the European Parliament as part of the national delegation. He joined the Socialists Group and served on committees such as the Budget Control Committee and the Budget Committee.

Rosa was awarded the Military Order of Christ (1959) and the Order of Francisco de Miranda. He died in 2017.
