= Pedro Pessanha =

Portuguese politician (born 1966)

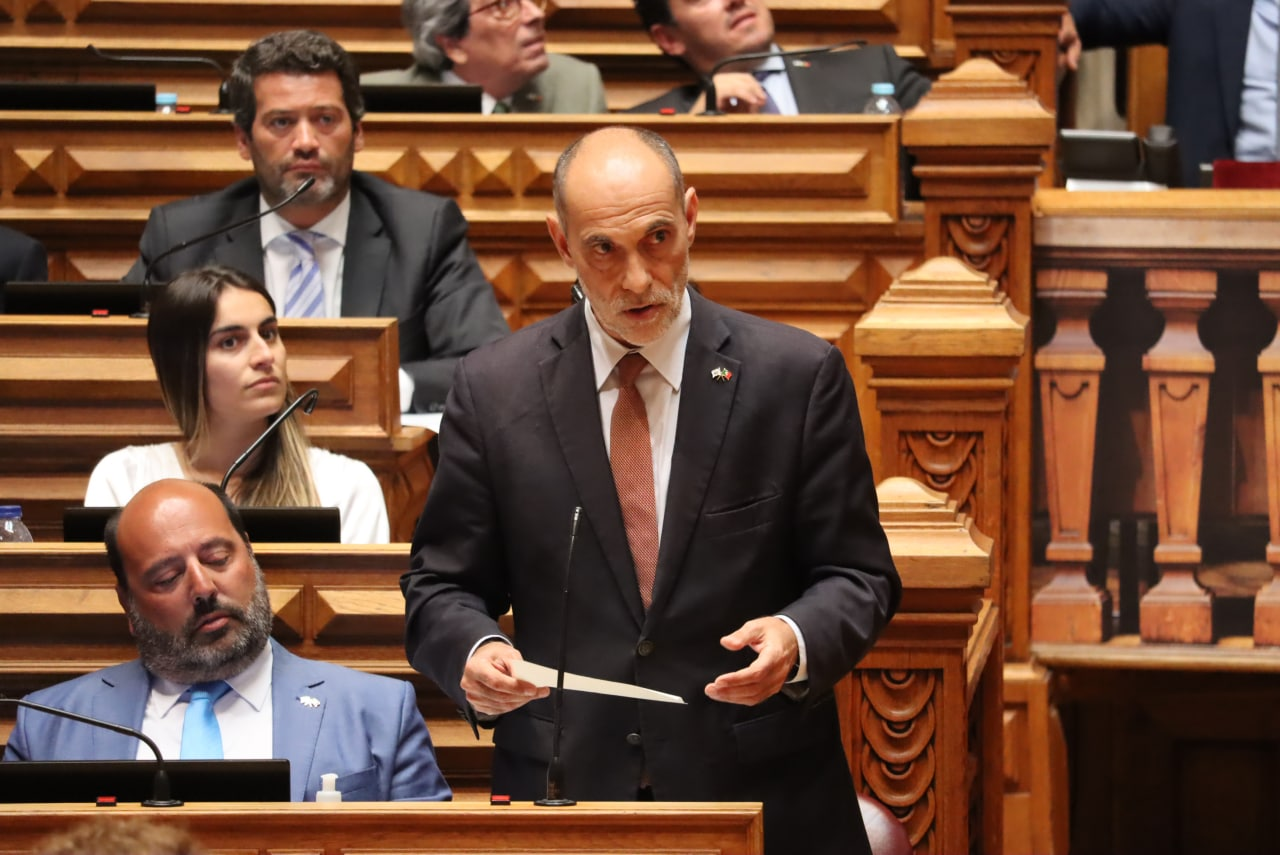

Member of the Assembly of the Republic
- Incumbent
- Assumed office 29 March 2022
- Constituency: Lisbon

Personal details
- Born: Pedro Manuel de Andrade Pessanha Fernandes; 12 September 1966 (age 59) Lisbon, Portugal
- Party: Chega (since 2019)
- Other political affiliations: CDS - People's Party (until 2013)

Pedro Manuel de Andrade Pessanha Fernandes (born 12 September 1966) is a Portuguese politician of the Chega party who was elected as a member of the Assembly of the Republic in 2022.

Pessanha was born in Lisbon in 1966. He worked as a real estate developer and served as a reservist officer in the Portuguese Marines. He was a member of the CDS - People's Party for a period and served as the regional secretary of the party in Cascais. In 2019, he caused some debate when he posted a photo of António de Oliveira Salazar on his Facebook page to mark the Carnation Revolution and captioned it with "now let the insults come."

During the 2022 Portuguese legislative election, Pessenha was elected to the Assembly of the Republic for the Lisbon constituency. He also serves as the party president of Chega in Lisbon district.
