= Marta Martins da Silva =

Portuguese politician and architect (born 1979)

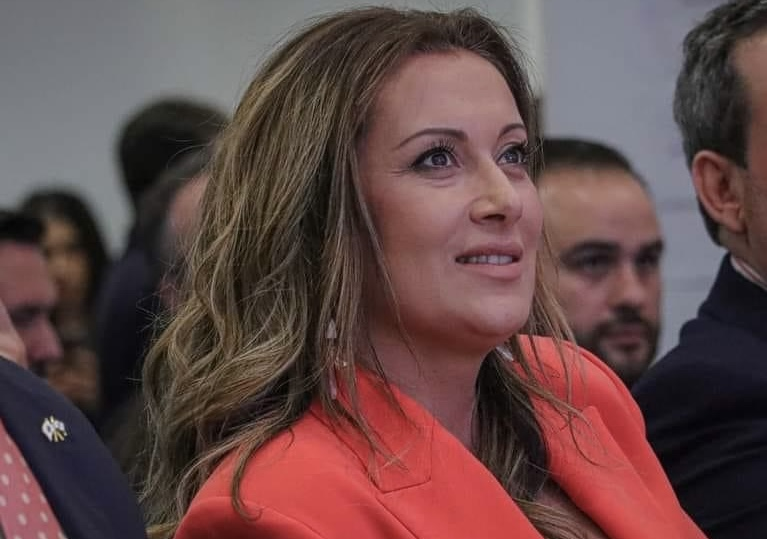

Vice President of Chega
- Incumbent
- Assumed office 30 May 2021
- President: André Ventura

Member of the Assembly of the Republic
- Incumbent
- Assumed office 26 March 2024
- Constituency: Lisbon

Personal details
- Born: 25 September 1979 (age 47) Lisbon, Portugal
- Party: CHEGA
- Education: University of Lisbon
- Occupation: Architect • Politician

Marta Sofia Martins da Silva Trindade (born 25 September 1979) is a Portuguese architect and politician. In the 2024 Portuguese national election she was elected to the Assembly of the Republic as a representative of the right-wing CHEGA party.

== Early life and education ==
Silva was born in the Portuguese capital of Lisbon on 25 September 1979. Having struggled with Science and Mathematics from an early age, she ended up obtaining a degree in architecture from the University of Lisbon in 2002.

== Personal life ==
According to the Assembly of the Republic website and to her Social Media presence, she is a single mother.

== Career ==
After graduating, Silva worked for various odd architectural companies, with the most recent being one she owns with her partner.

== Political career ==
Her political career is marked solely by offerings from the nucleus of her political party. At the third national convention of CHEGA in 2021, Silva was invited by the party president, André Ventura, to join its national leadership as one of the three vice-presidents. She also became the party's national local coordinator. In the 2022 national election she stood as a CHEGA candidate, being fifth on the party's list of candidates for the Porto district, but failing to be elected as the party only won two seats. After that she worked in the Assembly as a political advisor to the CHEGA parliamentary group. In the 2024 national election she was third on the party's list for the Lisbon constituency and was elected when the party won five seats. As a middle aged mother of a son, among her policies include an increase in the duration of maternity leave. She has also argued that increased immigration into Portugal can be beneficial for the country's economy.
