= Eva Cruzeiro =

Portuguese rapper and politician

Member of the Assembly of the Republic
- Incumbent
- Assumed office 3 June 2025
- Constituency: Lisbon

Personal details
- Born: Eva Marise Cruzeiro Alexandre; 7 October 1988 (age 37)
- Party: Socialist Party
- Occupation: Politician
- Profession: Rapper

Eva Marise Cruzeiro Alexandre (born 7 October 1988), also known as Eva Rapdiva, is a Portuguese rapper and politician, who is a member of the Assembly of the Republic since the 2025 legislative election.

She grew up in Seixal and in 2009 moved to Lobito, Angola, where she became one of the biggest names of rap in Angola.
