= Rita Rato =

Portuguese politician (born 1983)

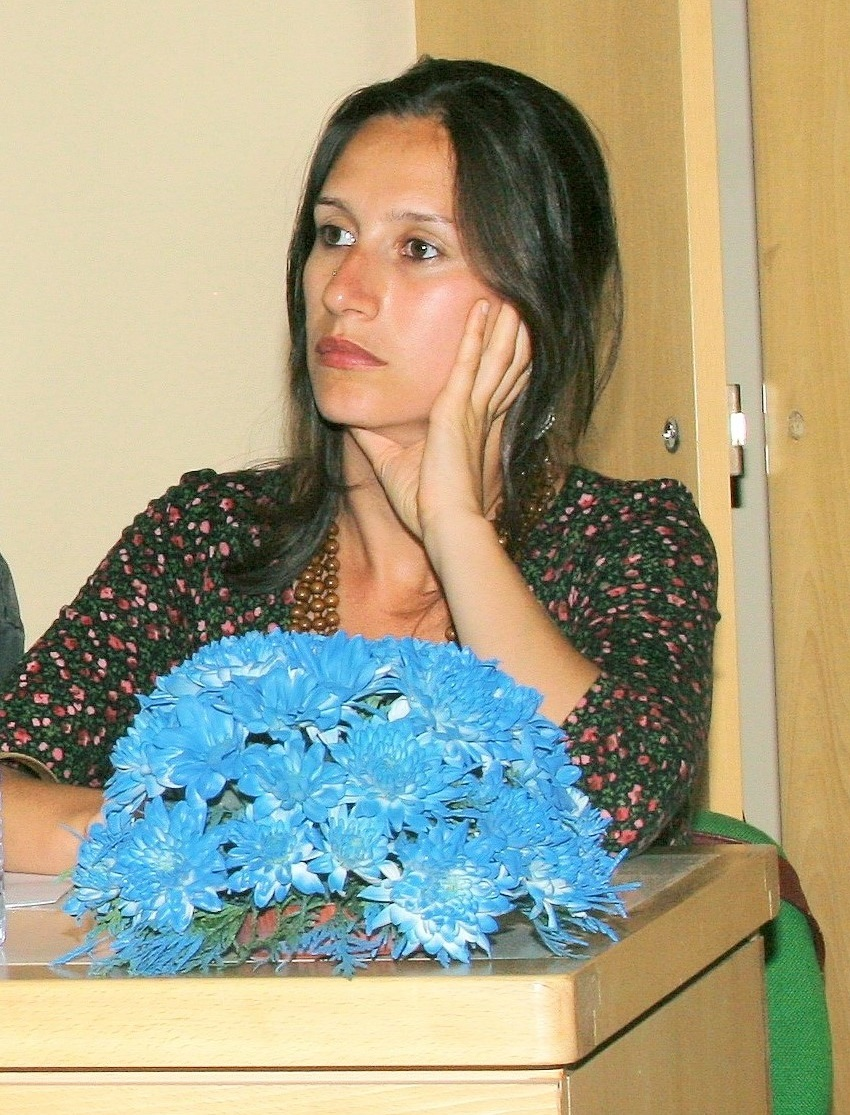

Member of the Assembly of the Republic
- In office 15 October 2009 – 24 October 2019
- Constituency: Lisbon

Personal details
- Born: Rita Rato Araújo Fonseca; 5 January 1983 (age 43) Estremoz, Évora District, Portugal
- Party: Portuguese Communist Party
- Education: Universidade Nova de Lisboa
- Occupation: Politician

Rita Rato Araújo Fonseca (born 5 January 1983, in Estremoz) is a Portuguese politician, who was a member of the Assembly of the Republic from 2009 to 2019. She has a bachelor's degree in Political Science and International Relations from the New University of Lisbon and is a member of the Portuguese Communist Party.

In July 2020, Rato was appointed director of the Aljube museum. This is a former Estado Novo political prison that now serves as a museum in honour of those who opposed the regime. Since the announcement of the choice, several criticisms have arisen, referring to her lack of training in the area and of practical museological experience.
