= Sandra Pereira (politician, born 1974) =

Portuguese politician

Sandra Cristina de Sequeiros Pereira

Member of the Assembly of the Republic
- Incumbent
- Assumed office 24 March 2024
- Constituency: Lisbon

Member of the Assembly of the Republic
- In office 23 October 2015 – 30 January 2022
- Constituency: Lisbon

Member of the Odivelas Municipal Assembly
- Incumbent
- Assumed office 2009

Personal details
- Born: 23 June 1974 (age 52) Portugal
- Party: Social Democratic Party
- Occupation: Jurist

Sandra Cristina de Sequeiros Pereira (born 1974) is a Portuguese politician. As a member of the Social Democratic Party (PSD), she was first elected as a deputy to the 13th legislature of the Assembly of the Republic of Portugal in 2015 and was re-elected in 2019. She was not elected in the 2022 national election but returned to the Assembly after the March 2024 election.

== Early life and education ==
Pereira was born on 23 June 1974. She obtained a degree in law. Since 2011 she has been associated with the Ligar á Vida association, an NGO designed to support social, educational, health and human rights projects in Portugal and Lusophone Countries. In Portugal it provides a nursing home, a home for children at risk, a day-care centre and a kindergarten. Between 2011 and 2015 she served as president of the annual general assembly of the NGO.

== Political career ==
From 2009 Pereira has represented the PSD as a councillor on the Odivelas Municipal Council. In 2015 she stood as a candidate on the PSD list of candidates to represent the Lisbon District in the Assembly of the Republic and was elected, being re-elected in 2019. She was not elected in the 2022 election, when the Socialist Party of the prime minister, António Costa won an overall majority. In the 2024 national election that followed the resignation of Costa, after allegations of corruption against members of his government, the PSD formed a coalition with two smaller parties to fight the election, known as the Democratic Alliance (AD). Pereira was sixth on the list of AD candidates for the Lisbon constituency and was elected after the coalition won 14 seats.

In Parliament, Pereira has served on the Health Committee. She has been outspoken on the subject of domestic violence and, as a graduate in law, has argued that judges need to be better trained to try domestic violence cases. She has also argued in favour of re-opening the discussion on euthanasia, which was approved by the Portuguese parliament in May 2023, arguing that it should be put to a referendum.
