= Isabel Moreira =

Portuguese politician

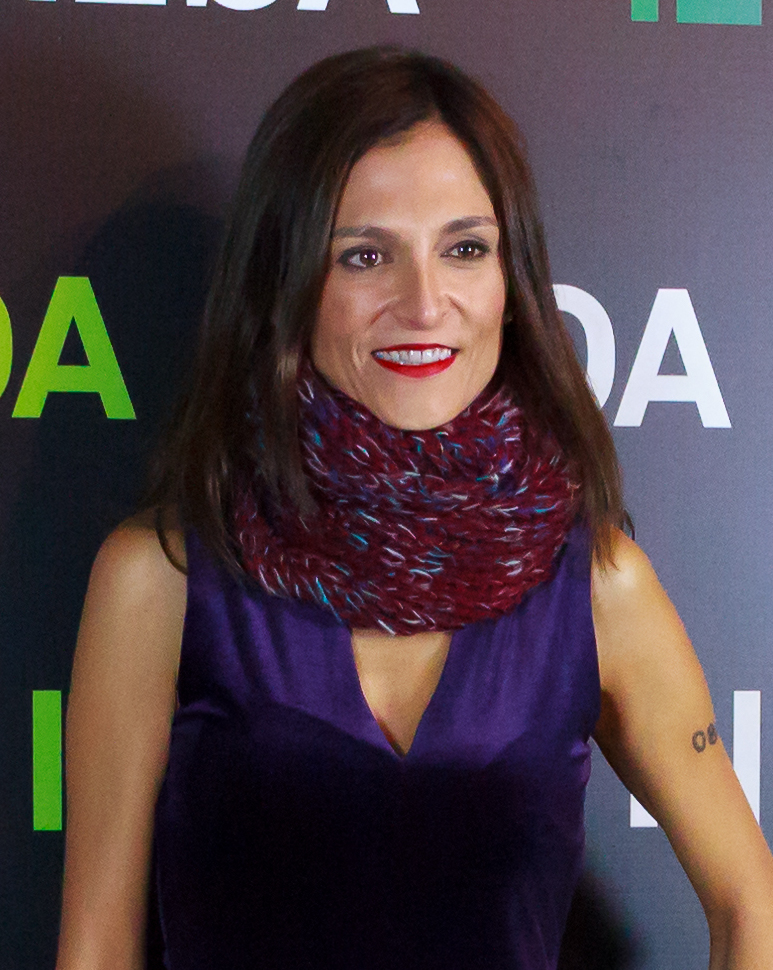
- Isabel Moreira in 2019

Member of the Assembly of the Republic
- Incumbent
- Assumed office 20 June 2011
- Constituency: Lisbon

Personal details
- Born: Isabel de Lima Mayer Alves Moreira; 2 April 1976 (age 50) Rio de Janeiro, Brazil
- Citizenship: Portugal
- Party: Socialist Party (2013–present)
- Other political affiliations: Independent (until 2013)
- Spouse: Tiago de Ayala Martins Barata (m. 1997, divorced)
- Parent: Adriano Moreira (father)
- Education: University of Lisbon

Isabel de Lima Mayer Alves Moreira (born 2 April 1976) is a Portuguese jurist and politician of the Socialist Party (PS) who has been serving as a member of the Assembly of the Republic since 2011. She is known for her campaigns in favour of LGBT rights.

== Early life ==
Isabel de Lima Mayer Alves Moreira was born in Rio de Janeiro, Brazil on 2 April 1976, the fourth of six children of Adriano Moreira and Isabel Mónica Maia de Lima Mayer. Her father had been an influential politician in Portugal in the mid-20th century, who was close to the repressive Estado Novo government and was for two years Minister of Overseas Territories. When the government was overthrown in 1974 by the Carnation Revolution, he and his family moved to Rio de Janeiro for two years.

Isabel Moreira was educated at the Mira Rio college in Lisbon, a school linked to Opus Dei. She has said that this led to her being distanced from religion. She then did undergraduate studies in law at the Faculty of Law of the University of Lisbon, followed by a master's degree in constitutional law. In 1997, she married Tiago de Ayala Martins Barata in Sintra. They are divorced and had no children.

== Early career ==
Moreira started her professional life as a lecturer in constitutional law and public international law at the University of Lisbon, having been admitted to take a PhD. At the same time, she worked as a lawyer in the area of public law and later provided consultancy and legal advice, particularly to Portugal's Minister of Foreign Affairs, Luís Amado. She also worked for the Agha Khan Foundation in Portugal.

== Political career ==
Moreira was elected as a Deputy in the Assembly of the Republic in the 2011 legislative elections on the Socialist Party's list for Lisbon, although she did not join the PS until around 2013. She was re-elected to the Assembly in 2015, 2019 and 2022. She is a member of the parliamentary committee on Constitutional Affairs, Rights, Freedoms and Guarantees. As a member of the Assembly, she has supported LGBT rights, such as same-sex marriage, the right to adoption by homosexual couples, and the recognition of different rights for transgender people.

In addition to her committee assignments, Moreira has been a member of the Portuguese delegation to the Parliamentary Assembly of the Council of Europe since 2022. In this capacity, she has been serving on the Committee on Legal Affairs and Human Rights; the Committee on Equality and Non-Discrimination; and the Sub-Committee on the implementation of judgments of the European Court of Human Rights.

Moreira has published several publications on the topic of fundamental rights. She writes frequently in newspapers and has frequently participated in a political debate program on the channel RTP Informação. She is also a writer.

== Publications ==
- Cela (Cell). 2018.
- Apátrida (Homeland). 2014.
- Ansiedade (Anxiety). 2011.
- O Casamento entre Pessoas do Mesmo Sexo (The marriage of people of the same sex). 2008. (with Carlos Pamplona Corte-Real and Luís Duarte D`Almeida)
- A Solução dos Direitos: Liberdades e garantias e dos direitos económicos, sociais e culturais na Constituição Portuguesa. (The Rights Solution: Freedoms and guarantees and economic, social and cultural rights in the Portuguese Constitution). 2007.
