= Celeste Correia =

Portuguese politician

Maria Celeste Lopes da Silva Correia

Member of the Assembly of the Republic

Personal details
- Born: 8 October 1948 (age 77) Mindelo, Cape Verde
- Party: Portuguese; Socialist Party (PS)
- Education: University of Lisbon
- Occupation: Teacher

Celeste Correia (born 1948) is a naturalized Portuguese teacher and politician, originally from the former Portuguese colony of Cape Verde. She represented the Portuguese Socialist Party (PS) as a member of the Assembly of the Republic between 1995 and 2011 and, again, from 2014 to 2015.

== Early life ==
Maria Celeste Lopes da Silva Correia was born on 8 October 1948 to a middle-class family in Mindelo, São Vicente, Cape Verde. First studying at the Gil Eanes School in Cape Verde, she later graduated with a bachelor's degree in Romanic Philology, studying for a master's degree in Intercultural relations at the Universidade Aberta, Portugal's distance learning university, and in Descriptive Portuguese Linguistics at the Faculty of Arts of the University of Lisbon. She then became a Portuguese teacher in a secondary school.

== Political career ==
Elected to the Portuguese parliament in 1995, Correia held various functions in the Socialist Party, including being a member of its Political Commission, and in the Assembly of the Republic, where she was responsible for the establishment of the High Commission for Intercultural Dialogue, currently the High Commission for Migration, the Law Against Racial Discrimination, and the Reform of the Nationality Law. In 2011 she was excluded from the list of candidates of the PS for the forthcoming election, without any apparent explanation of the reason. She was reinstated in the PS list in 2014 and re-elected until 2015. In 2021 it was announced that she would join the executive of the Lisbon municipal council, replacing a councillor who had resigned after being discovered to have been vaccinated against COVID-19 when he was not entitled to receive the vaccine. She had previously served as a deputy councillor.

== Social work ==
Correia also works closely with the Lisbon immigrant community. She is a member of the Associação Caboverdiana de Lisboa (Cape Verde Association of Lisbon) and an NGO working with immigrants.
