= Felicidade Vital =

Portuguese politician (born 1965)

Felicidade Vital De Alcântara
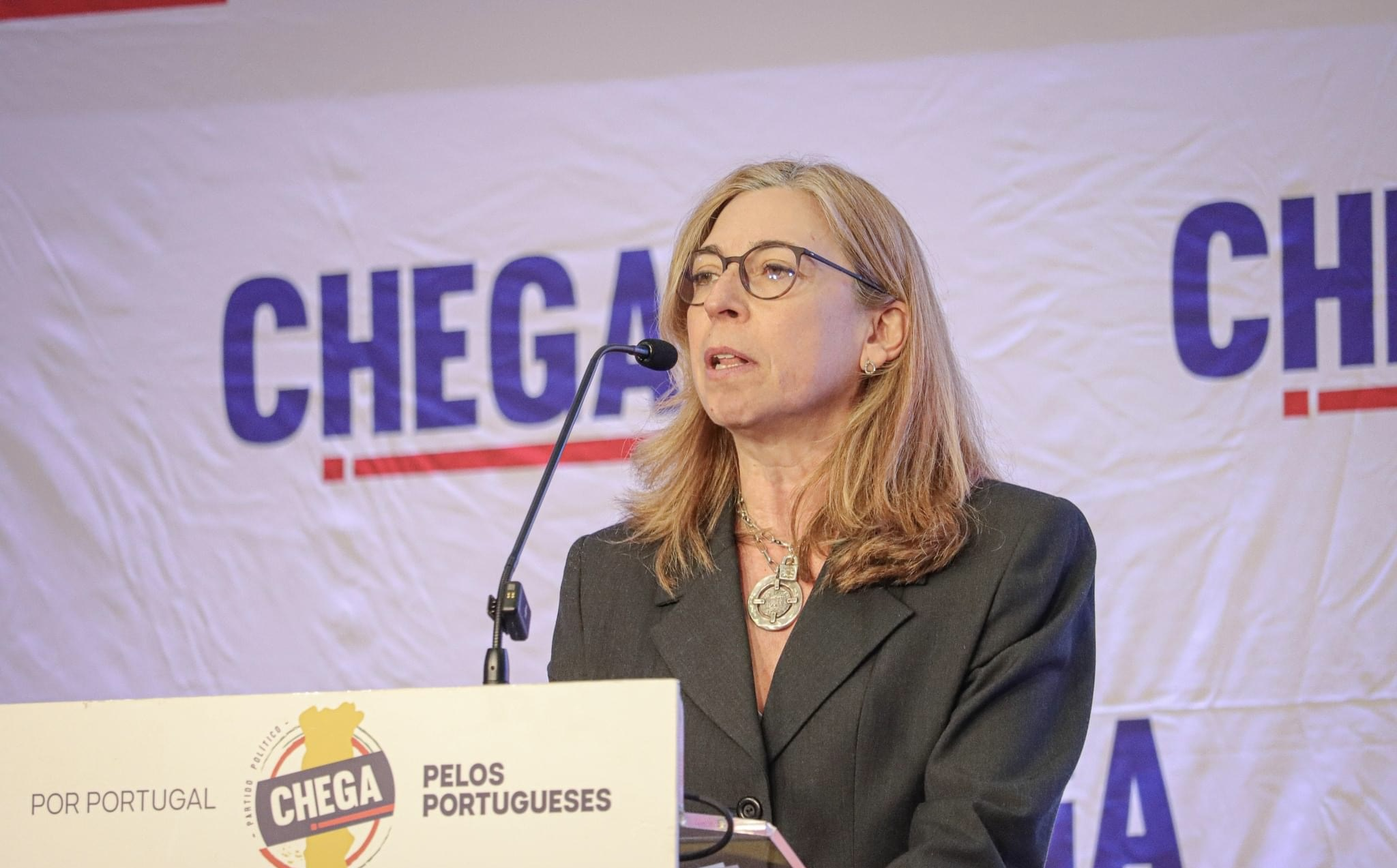

Member of the Assembly of the Republic
- Incumbent
- Assumed office 26 March 2024
- Constituency: Lisbon District

Personal details
- Born: 13 June 1965 (age 61) Luanda, Portuguese Angola
- Party: Portuguese: CHEGA
- Occupation: Politician

Felicidade Maria da Silva Santos Vital de Alcântara (born 13 June 1965) is a Portuguese politician. In the 2024 Portuguese national election she was elected to the Assembly of the Republic as a representative of the right-wing CHEGA party.

== Early life and education ==
Vital was born in Luanda on 13 June 1965 in what was then Portuguese Angola. Her parents returned to Portugal from Angola when she was four, to live in the capital of Lisbon, residing in the Campo de Ourique district. She studied at Liceu Rainha D. Leonor, a girls' school, and then graduated in 1991 with a degree in chemical engineering from the Instituto Superior de Engenharia de Lisboa (ISEL), now part of the Polytechnical Institute of Lisbon. In 1998 she received a master's degree in project management from the Lisbon campus of the Catholic University of Portugal. She also studied cardiopulmonology and rehabilitation.

== Career ==
Vital initially worked as a quality supervisor and manager for Unilever, then becoming a category manager for Sonae, the largest private sector employer in Portugal. After her training in cardiopulmonology she started to work in this field in a clinic in Lisbon before moving to the Beatriz Ângelo hospital in Loures, to the immediate north of Lisbon, in 2012. She later took up a management position in the same hospital.

== Political career ==
Vital joined CHEGA in August 2020. She was elected as a substitute member of the Lisbon City Council in the 2021 election. In the March 2024 national election she was sixth on the list of CHEGA candidates for the Lisbon District, with the party winning nine seats. In the parliament she was appointed to be a member of the Health Committee and the Labour, Social Security and Inclusion Committee. One of her first interventions in the National Assembly was to accuse her fellow parliamentarians of having no idea about the quality of public hospitals in Portugal because they were always treated privately.
