= Bruno Ventura (politician) =

Portuguese politician (born 1980)

Member of the Assembly of the Republic
- Incumbent
- Assumed office 26 March 2024
- Constituency: Lisbon
- In office 10 March 2005 – 14 October 2009
- Constituency: Lisbon

Personal details
- Born: 23 April 1980 (age 45) Forte da Casa (Vila Franca de Xira)
- Party: Social Democratic Party

Bruno Miguel Pedrosa Ventura (born 23 April 1980) is a Portuguese politician. He has been a member of the Assembly of the Republic since 2024, having previously served from 2005 to 2009. He formerly served as leader of the Social Democratic Youth in Lisbon.
