= Margarida Saavedra =

Portuguese politician and architect (born 1952)

Margarida Maria de Moura Alves da Silva de Almeida Saavedra

Member of the Assembly of the Republic
- Constituency: Lisbon District
- Incumbent
- Assumed office 26 March 2024

Personal details
- Born: 22 October 1952 (age 73)
- Party: Social Democratic Party
- Occupation: Architect • politician

Margarida Maria de Moura Alves da Silva de Almeida Saavedra (born 1952) is a Portuguese architect who, in the March 2024 election, was elected to be a deputy in the 16th Legislature of the Third Portuguese Republic. She is a member of the Social Democratic Party (PSD) and was elected to represent the Lisbon constituency.

== Career ==
Saavedra was born on 22 October 1952. She obtained university qualifications as an architect and in 1979 joined the Lisbon City Council as a result of a public examination. She has worked with the city council on urban management since that time, being with the Empresa Pública de Urbanização de Lisboa (Lisbon Urbanization Public Company) since 2010. She has said that when she served as director of urban management, she succeeded in reducing a backlog of planning cases from 12,000 to nil in two years. A former councillor on Lisbon City Council, she was also writing regular opinion pieces for the newspaper, Público.

== Political career ==
In the 2024 national election, called early after the resignation of prime minister António Costa following allegations of corruption by members of his Socialist Party (PS) government, the PSD formed an alliance with two smaller parties, known as the Democratic Alliance (AD). Saavedra was eighth on the AD list of candidates for the Lisbon district and was elected when the AD won 13 of the 48 seats available in the constituency. In the parliament, she became a member of the Economy, Public Works, and Housing Committee.

== Controversy ==
On 18 April 2024, a request was made by a judge for the waiving of parliamentary immunity of Saavedra and two other PSD deputies, Luís Newton and Carlos Eduardo Reis, as part of an investigation into an alleged conspiracy on the part of PSD and PS members from 2016 to allocate political places in the parishes and municipalities of the Lisbon district. Saavedra was under investigation for "qualified fraud". According to the law, those elected to Parliament cannot be defendants without authorization from the Assembly of the Republic, which is mandatory when there is strong evidence of committing an intentional crime that carries a prison sentence whose limit maximum is more than 3 years.
