= Rui Vieira =

Portuguese footballer

Personal information
- Full name: Rui Gabriel Pinheiro Vieira
- Date of birth: 13 November 1991 (age 34)
- Place of birth: Braga, Portugal
- Height: 1.89 m (6 ft 2 in)
- Position: Goalkeeper

Youth career
- 2003–2005: Escola de Formação Fintas
- 2005–2010: Braga

Senior career*
Years	Team	Apps	(Gls)
2010−2012	Braga	0	(0)
2010−2011	→ Maria Fonte (loan)	32	(0)
2011−2012	→ Vizela (loan)	3	(0)
2012−2013	Covilhã	7	(0)
2013−2015	Marítimo B	21	(0)
2015−2018	Rio Ave	10	(0)
2018–2019	Arouca	10	(0)
2019–2020	Chaves B	17	(0)
2020–2021	Valadares Gaia	9	(0)
2022	Fafe	9	(0)
2022–2023	São Martinho	21	(0)
2023–2024	Trofense	5	(0)
Total		144	(0)

International career
2009−2010	Portugal U19	2	(0)
- * Club domestic league appearances and goals

Rui Gabriel Pinheiro Vieira (born 13 November 1991 in Braga) is a Portuguese former professional footballer who played as a goalkeeper.
