= José Barreira Soares =

Portuguese politician (born 1976)

Member of the Assembly of the Republic
- Incumbent
- Assumed office 26 March 2024
- Constituency: Lisbon

Personal details
- Born: 24 August 1976 (age 50)
- Party: Chega

José Barreira Soares (born 24 August 1976) is a Portuguese politician serving as a member of the Assembly of the Republic since 2024. He has been a municipal councillor of Vila Franca de Xira since 2021.
