= Acácio Barreiros =

Portuguese politician (1948–2004)

Personal details
- Born: Acácio Manuel de Frias Barreiros; 24 March 1948 Cabinda, Portuguese Angola
- Died: 18 February 2004 (aged 55)
- Party: Popular Democratic Union (1975–1979); Socialist Party (1983–2004)

Acácio Manuel de Frias Barreiros (24 March 1948 – 18 February 2004) was a Portuguese politician. Between 1975 and 1979, he was the sole representative of the Popular Democratic Union (UDP), a Marxist political party, in the Assembly of the Republic. After leaving the UDP in 1979, he joined the centre-left Socialist Party (PS), and was a member of the Assembly of the Republic between 1983 and 1987, 1991–1999 and from 2001 until his death in 2004. He was Secretary of State for Consumer Protection between 1999 and 2001, in António Guterres' second government.
