= List of members of the 16th Assembly of the Republic (Portugal) =

This is a list of members of the Assembly of the Republic of Portugal elected at the legislative election held on 10 March 2024, and subsequent changes during the 16th legislative term.

== Permanent members ==
Name	Constituency	Party	Alliance	Group	Took office	Left office	Notes
Ana Abrunhosa	Coimbra	Socialist Party		PS	26 March 2024	Suspended	Temporarily replaced by Daniel Azenha
Óscar Afonso	Porto	Independent	Democratic Alliance	PSD	26 March 2024	Suspended	Resigned, replaced by Carla Barros
Rui Afonso	Porto	Chega		CH	26 March 2024		
Maria José Aguiar	Aveiro	Chega		CH	26 March 2024		
José Pedro Aguiar-Branco	Viana do Castelo	Social Democratic Party	Democratic Alliance	PSD	26 March 2024		President
Amílcar Almeida	Vila Real	Social Democratic Party	Democratic Alliance	PSD	26 March 2024		
Ângela Almeida	Aveiro	Social Democratic Party	Democratic Alliance	PSD	26 March 2024		
Pedro Alves	Viseu	Social Democratic Party	Democratic Alliance	PSD	26 March 2024		
Pedro Delgado Alves	Lisbon	Socialist Party		PS	26 March 2024		
António Leitão Amaro	Viseu	Social Democratic Party	Democratic Alliance	PSD	26 March 2024		
Diogo Pacheco de Amorim	Porto	Chega		CH	26 March 2024		Third Vice President
Sofia Andrade	Porto	Socialist Party		PS	26 March 2024		
Gilberto Anjos	Braga	Socialist Party		PS	26 March 2024		
Ana Sofia Antunes	Leiria	Socialist Party		PS	26 March 2024	Suspended	Temporarily replaced by Ana Louro
Ricardo Araújo	Braga	Social Democratic Party	Democratic Alliance	PSD	26 March 2024		
Luísa Areosa	Santarém	Chega		CH	26 March 2024		
Miguel Arruda	Azores	Chega		CH	26 March 2024		
Francisco de Assis	Porto	Socialist Party		PS	26 March 2024		
Sergio Ávila	Azores	Socialist Party		PS	26 March 2024		
João Azevedo	Viseu	Socialist Party		PS	26 March 2024		
João Vale e Azevedo	Lisbon	Social Democratic Party	Democratic Alliance	PSD	26 March 2024		
Vanessa Barata	Braga	Chega		CH	26 March 2024		
Carlos Barbosa	Braga	Chega		CH	26 March 2024		
José Carlos Barbosa	Porto	Socialist Party		PS	26 March 2024		
André Pinotes Batista	Setúbal	Socialist Party		PS	26 March 2024		
Maria Begonha	Lisbon	Socialist Party		PS	26 March 2024		
Ana Bernardo	Lisbon	Socialist Party		PS	26 March 2024		
Bernardo Blanco	Lisbon	Liberal Initiative		IL	26 March 2024		
Jorge Brandão	Faro	Socialist Party		PS	26 March 2024		
Filipe Neto Brandão	Aveiro	Socialist Party		PS	26 March 2024		
Carlos Brás	Porto	Socialist Party		PS	26 March 2024		
Nelson Brito	Beja	Socialist Party		PS	26 March 2024		
Ana Gabriela Cabilhas	Porto	Independent	Democratic Alliance	PSD	26 March 2024		
Miguel Cabrita	Lisbon	Socialist Party		PS	26 March 2024		
Carlos Cação	Braga	Social Democratic Party	Democratic Alliance	PSD	26 March 2024		
Paulo Cafôfo	Madeira	Socialist Party		PS	26 March 2024	Suspended	Temporarily replaced by Sofia Canha
Patrícia Caixinha	Castelo Branco	Socialist Party		PS	26 March 2024		
Clarisse Campos	Setúbal	Socialist Party		PS	26 March 2024		
Paula Cardoso	Aveiro	Social Democratic Party	Democratic Alliance	PSD	26 March 2024		
Hugo Carneiro	Porto	Social Democratic Party	Democratic Alliance	PSD	26 March 2024		
José Luís Carneiro	Braga	Socialist Party		PS	26 March 2024	Suspended	Temporarily replaced by Eduardo Oliveira
Sofia Carreira	Leiria	Social Democratic Party	Democratic Alliance	PSD	26 March 2024		
José Carvalho	Porto	Chega		CH	26 March 2024		
Patrícia Carvalho	Setúbal	Chega		CH	26 March 2024		
Ricardo Carvalho	Leiria	Social Democratic Party	Democratic Alliance	PSD	26 March 2024		
Paulo Cavaleiro	Aveiro	Social Democratic Party	Democratic Alliance	PSD	26 March 2024		
Emília Cerqueira	Viana do Castelo	Social Democratic Party	Democratic Alliance	PSD	26 March 2024		
Francisco César	Azores	Socialist Party		PS	26 March 2024		
José Cesário	Outside Europe	Social Democratic Party	Democratic Alliance	PSD	26 March 2024		
Walter Chicharro	Leiria	Socialist Party		PS	26 March 2024		
Marco Claudino	Lisbon	Social Democratic Party	Democratic Alliance	PSD	26 March 2024		
Mara Lagriminha Coelho	Santarém	Socialist Party		PS	26 March 2024		
Pedro Coelho	Madeira	Social Democratic Party	Madeira First	PSD	26 March 2024		
Pedro Coimbra	Coimbra	Socialist Party		PS	26 March 2024		
Joana Cordeiro	Setúbal	Liberal Initiative		IL	26 March 2024		
Madalena Cordeiro	Lisbon	Chega		CH	26 March 2024		
João Paulo Correia	Porto	Socialist Party		PS	26 March 2024	Suspended	Temporarily replaced by Sara Margarida Lobão
Pedro Correia	Santarém	Chega		CH	26 March 2024		
Susana Correia	Aveiro	Socialist Party		PS	26 March 2024		Second Deputy Secretary
Hugo Costa	Santarém	Socialist Party		PS	26 March 2024		
Irene Costa	Braga	Socialist Party		PS	26 March 2024		
José Costa	Viana do Castelo	Socialist Party		PS	26 March 2024	Suspended	Temporarily replaced by Dora Brandão
Ricardo Costa	Braga	Socialist Party		PS	26 March 2024		
Rui Cristina	Évora	Chega		CH	26 March 2024		
Alexandre Homem Cristo	Lisbon	Independent	Democratic Alliance	PSD	26 March 2024		
José Rui Cruz	Viseu	Socialist Party		PS	26 March 2024		
Eurico Brilhante Dias	Leiria	Socialist Party		PS	26 March 2024		Leader of the PS group
Hernâni Dias	Bragança	Social Democratic Party	Democratic Alliance	PSD	26 March 2024		
Luís Dias	Évora	Socialist Party		PS	26 March 2024		
Inês Domingos	Viseu	Social Democratic Party	Democratic Alliance	PSD	26 March 2024		
Edite Estrela	Lisbon	Socialist Party		PS	26 March 2024		
Telmo Faria	Leiria	Social Democratic Party	Democratic Alliance	PSD	26 March 2024		
Patrícia Faro	Porto	Socialist Party		PS	26 March 2024		
Nuno Fazenda	Castelo Branco	Socialist Party		PS	26 March 2024	Suspended	Temporarily replaced by Tiago Soares Monteiro
José Dias Fernandes	Europe	Chega		CH	26 March 2024		
Luís Paulo Fernandes	Leiria	Chega		CH	26 March 2024		
Isabel Ferreira	Bragança	Socialist Party		PS	26 March 2024	Suspended	Temporarily replaced by Caroline Pereira
Raquel Ferreira	Coimbra	Socialist Party		PS	26 March 2024		
Fabian Figueiredo	Lisbon	Left Bloc		BE	26 March 2024		Leader of the BE group
António Filipe	Lisbon	Portuguese Communist Party	Unitary Democratic Coalition	PCP	26 March 2024		
Alberto Fonseca	Porto	Social Democratic Party	Democratic Alliance	PSD	26 March 2024		
Pedro dos Santos Frazão	Santarém	Chega		CH	26 March 2024		
Olga Freire	Porto	Social Democratic Party	Democratic Alliance	PSD	26 March 2024		
Henrique Rocha de Freitas	Portalegre	Chega		CH	26 March 2024		
Nuno Gabriel	Setúbal	Chega		CH	26 March 2024		
Jorge Galveias	Aveiro	Chega		CH	26 March 2024		
Rosário Gambôa	Porto	Socialist Party		PS	26 March 2024		
Patrícia Gilvaz	Porto	Liberal Initiative		IL	26 March 2024		
Ana Mendes Godinho	Guarda	Socialist Party		PS	26 March 2024	Suspended	Temporarily replaced by António Monteirinho
Francisco Gomes	Madeira	Chega		CH	26 March 2024		
Marina Gonçalves	Viana do Castelo	Socialist Party		PS	26 March 2024	Suspended	Temporarily replaced by António Quintas
Nuno Jorge Gonçalves	Bragança	Social Democratic Party	Democratic Alliance	PSD	26 March 2024		
João Paulo Graça	Faro	Chega		CH	26 March 2024		
Luís Graça	Faro	Socialist Party		PS	26 March 2024		
Armando Grave	Aveiro	Chega		CH	26 March 2024		
Emídio Guerreiro	Braga	Social Democratic Party	Democratic Alliance	PSD	26 March 2024		
Miguel Guimarães	Porto	Independent	Democratic Alliance	PSD	26 March 2024		
Miguel Iglésias	Madeira	Socialist Party		PS	26 March 2024		
Rita Júdice	Coimbra	Independent	Democratic Alliance	PSD	26 March 2024		
Gonçalo Lage	Lisbon	Social Democratic Party	Democratic Alliance	PSD	26 March 2024		
Alexandra Leitão	Santarém	Socialist Party		PS	26 March 2024		
Mariana Leitão	Lisbon	Liberal Initiative		IL	26 March 2024		Leader of the IL group
Joana Lima	Porto	Socialist Party		PS	26 March 2024		Third Secretary
Ricardo Lima	Lisbon	Socialist Party		PS	26 March 2024		
Ricardo Lino	Coimbra	Socialist Party		PS	26 March 2024		
Francisco Covelinhas Lopes	Porto	Social Democratic Party	Democratic Alliance	PSD	26 March 2024		
Isabel Mendes Lopes	Lisbon	LIVRE		L	26 March 2024		Leader of the L group
Mário Amorim Lopes	Aveiro	Liberal Initiative		IL	26 March 2024		
Miguel Pinto Luz	Faro	Social Democratic Party	Democratic Alliance	PSD	26 March 2024		
Alberto Machado	Porto	Social Democratic Party	Democratic Alliance	PSD	26 March 2024		
António Alberto Machado	Vila Real	Social Democratic Party	Democratic Alliance	PSD	26 March 2024		
Palmira Maciel	Braga	Socialist Party		PS	26 March 2024		Third Deputy Secretary
Jamila Madeira	Faro	Socialist Party		PS	26 March 2024		
Manuel Magno	Outside Europe	Chega		CH	26 March 2024		
Alfredo Maia	Porto	Portuguese Communist Party	Unitary Democratic Coalition	PCP	26 March 2024		
Salvador Malheiro	Aveiro	Social Democratic Party	Democratic Alliance	PSD	26 March 2024		
Paula Margarido	Madeira	Social Democratic Party	Madeira First	PSD	26 March 2024		
Maurício Marques	Coimbra	Social Democratic Party	Democratic Alliance	PSD	26 March 2024		
Ana Paula Martins	Lisbon	Social Democratic Party	Democratic Alliance	PSD	26 March 2024		
Marisa Matias	Porto	Left Bloc		BE	26 March 2024		
Rita Matias	Setúbal	Chega		CH	26 March 2024		
Miguel Matos	Setúbal	Socialist Party		PS	26 March 2024		
Fernando Medina	Lisbon	Socialist Party		PS	26 March 2024	Suspended	Temporarily replaced by Rita Borges Madeira
Filipe Melo	Braga	Chega		CH	26 March 2024		Fourth Deputy Secretary
Nuno Melo	Porto	CDS – People's Party	Democratic Alliance	CDS-PP	26 March 2024		
Nuno Simões de Melo	Guarda	Chega		CH	26 March 2024		
Raul Melo	Porto	Chega		CH	26 March 2024		
Ana Catarina Mendonça Mendes	Setúbal	Socialist Party		PS	26 March 2024	Suspended	Temporarily replaced by Fernando José
António Mendes	Setúbal	Socialist Party		PS	26 March 2024	Suspended	Temporarily replaced by Ivan Gonçalves
Clara Marques Mendes	Braga	Social Democratic Party	Democratic Alliance	PSD	26 March 2024		
Paulo Moniz	Azores	Social Democratic Party	Democratic Alliance	PSD	26 March 2024		
Sónia Monteiro	Porto	Chega		CH	26 March 2024		
Luís Montenegro	Lisbon	Social Democratic Party	Democratic Alliance	PSD	26 March 2024		Prime Minister designate
Isaura Morais	Santarém	Social Democratic Party	Democratic Alliance	PSD	26 March 2024		
Teresa Morais	Setúbal	Social Democratic Party	Democratic Alliance	PSD	26 March 2024		First Vice President
Almiro Moreira	Aveiro	Social Democratic Party	Democratic Alliance	PSD	26 March 2024		
Isabel Alves Moreira	Lisbon	Socialist Party		PS	26 March 2024		
Joana Mortágua	Setúbal	Left Bloc		BE	26 March 2024		
Mariana Mortágua	Lisbon	Left Bloc		BE	26 March 2024		
Dulcineia Catarina Moura	Guarda	Social Democratic Party	Democratic Alliance	PSD	26 March 2024		
João Moura	Santarém	Social Democratic Party	Democratic Alliance	PSD	26 March 2024		
Paulo Muacho	Setúbal	LIVRE		L	26 March 2024		
Andreia Neto	Porto	Social Democratic Party	Democratic Alliance	PSD	26 March 2024		
Eliseu Neves	Coimbra	Chega		CH	26 March 2024		
Paulo Neves	Madeira	Social Democratic Party	Madeira First	PSD	26 March 2024		
Luís Newton	Lisbon	Social Democratic Party	Democratic Alliance	PSD	26 March 2024		
Cristóvão Norte	Faro	Social Democratic Party	Democratic Alliance	PSD	26 March 2024		
Paulo Núncio	Lisbon	CDS – People's Party	Democratic Alliance	CDS-PP	26 March 2024		Leader of the CDS-PP group
Bruno Nunes	Lisbon	Chega		CH	26 March 2024		
Hugo Oliveira	Aveiro	Socialist Party		PS	26 March 2024		
Hugo Patrício Oliveira	Leiria	Social Democratic Party	Democratic Alliance	PSD	26 March 2024		
Jorge Paulo Oliveira	Braga	Social Democratic Party	Democratic Alliance	PSD	26 March 2024		First Secretary
Isabel Oneto	Porto	Socialist Party		PS	26 March 2024	Suspended	Temporarily replaced by Hugo Carvalho
Elza Pais	Viseu	Socialist Party		PS	26 March 2024		
António Pinto Pereira	Coimbra	Chega		CH	26 March 2024		
Carlos Pereira	Lisbon	Socialist Party		PS	26 March 2024		
Eurídice Pereira	Setúbal	Socialist Party		PS	26 March 2024		
Sandra Pereira	Lisbon	Social Democratic Party	Democratic Alliance	PSD	26 March 2024		First Deputy Secretary
Marcos Perestrello	Lisbon	Socialist Party		PS	26 March 2024		Second Vice President
Bernardo Pessanha	Viseu	Chega		CH	26 March 2024		
Pedro Pessanha	Lisbon	Chega		CH	26 March 2024		
Francisco Pimentel	Azores	Social Democratic Party	Democratic Alliance	PSD	26 March 2024		
Eduardo Pinheiro	Porto	Socialist Party		PS	26 March 2024	Suspended	Temporarily replaced by António Pedro Faria
Ricardo Pinheiro	Portalegre	Socialist Party		PS	26 March 2024		
Eva Brás Pinho	Lisbon	Social Democratic Party	Democratic Alliance	PSD	26 March 2024		
Carlos Guimarães Pinto	Porto	Liberal Initiative		IL	26 March 2024		
Fátima Correia Pinto	Vila Real	Socialist Party		PS	26 March 2024		
Jorge Pinto	Porto	LIVRE		L	26 March 2024		
Pedro Pinto	Faro	Chega		CH	26 March 2024		Leader of the CH group
Ricardo Dias Pinto	Lisbon	Chega		CH	26 March 2024		
Sérgio Sousa Pinto	Lisbon	Socialist Party		PS	26 March 2024		
Paulo Pisco	Europe	Socialist Party		PS	26 March 2024		
Manuel Pizarro	Porto	Socialist Party		PS	26 March 2024	Suspended	Temporarily replaced by Paulo Araújo Correia
Alexandre Poço	Lisbon	Social Democratic Party	Democratic Alliance	PSD	26 March 2024		
Paulo Raimundo	Lisbon	Portuguese Communist Party	Unitary Democratic Coalition	PCP	26 March 2024		
Ofélia Ramos	Faro	Social Democratic Party	Democratic Alliance	PSD	26 March 2024		
Sónia Ramos	Évora	Social Democratic Party	Democratic Alliance	PSD	26 March 2024		
Inês de Sousa Real	Lisbon	People Animals Nature		PAN	26 March 2024		
João Paulo Rebelo	Setúbal	Socialist Party		PS	26 March 2024		
Silvério Regalado	Aveiro	Social Democratic Party	Democratic Alliance	PSD	26 March 2024		
Carlos Eduardo Reis	Braga	Social Democratic Party	Democratic Alliance	PSD	26 March 2024		
Liliana Reis	Castelo Branco	Social Democratic Party	Democratic Alliance	PSD	26 March 2024		
Sonia dos Reis	Setúbal	Social Democratic Party	Democratic Alliance	PSD	26 March 2024		
Diva Ribeiro	Beja	Chega		CH	26 March 2024		
Gabriel Mithá Ribeiro	Leiria	Chega		CH	26 March 2024		Fourth Secretary
João Ribeiro	Castelo Branco	Chega		CH	26 March 2024		
Paulo Simões Ribeiro	Setúbal	Social Democratic Party	Democratic Alliance	PSD	26 March 2024		
Sandra Ribeiro	Faro	Chega		CH	26 March 2024		
Tiago Barbosa Ribeiro	Porto	Socialist Party		PS	26 March 2024		
André Rijo	Lisbon	Socialist Party		PS	26 March 2024		
Germana Rocha	Porto	Social Democratic Party	Democratic Alliance	PSD	26 March 2024		Second Secretary
Rui Rocha	Braga	Liberal Initiative		IL	26 March 2024		
Cristina Rodrigues	Porto	Chega		CH	26 March 2024		
Pedro Roque	Porto	Social Democratic Party	Democratic Alliance	PSD	26 March 2024		
Margarida Saavedra	Lisbon	Social Democratic Party	Democratic Alliance	PSD	26 March 2024		
Ana Santos	Braga	Independent	Democratic Alliance	PSD	26 March 2024		
Cláudia Santos	Aveiro	Socialist Party		PS	26 March 2024		
João Antunes Santos	Leiria	Social Democratic Party	Democratic Alliance	PSD	26 March 2024		
Marcus Santos	Porto	Chega		CH	26 March 2024		
Paula Santos	Setúbal	Portuguese Communist Party	Unitary Democratic Coalition	PCP	26 March 2024		Leader of the PCP group
Pedro Nuno Santos	Aveiro	Socialist Party		PS	26 March 2024		Leader of the Opposition
Rodrigo Saraiva	Lisbon	Liberal Initiative		IL	26 March 2024		Fourth Vice President
Joaquim Miranda Sarmento	Lisbon	Social Democratic Party	Democratic Alliance	PSD	26 March 2024		Leader of the PSD group
Carlos Silva	Vila Real	Socialist Party		PS	26 March 2024		
Mariana Vieira da Silva	Lisbon	Socialist Party		PS	26 March 2024	Suspended	Temporarily replaced by Davide Amado
Marta Martins da Silva	Lisbon	Chega		CH	26 March 2024		
Hugo Soares	Braga	Social Democratic Party	Democratic Alliance	PSD	26 March 2024		
José Barreira Soares	Lisbon	Chega		CH	26 March 2024		
José Moura Soeiro	Porto	Left Bloc		BE	26 March 2024		
Eduardo Oliveira e Sousa	Santarém	Independent	Democratic Alliance	PSD	26 March 2024		
Emídio Sousa	Aveiro	Social Democratic Party	Democratic Alliance	PSD	26 March 2024		
Pedro Sousa	Braga	Socialist Party		PS	26 March 2024		
Pedro Neves de Sousa	Porto	Social Democratic Party	Democratic Alliance	PSD	26 March 2024		
Rui Paulo Sousa	Lisbon	Chega		CH	26 March 2024		
Martim Syder	Coimbra	Social Democratic Party	Democratic Alliance	PSD	26 March 2024		
Rui Tavares	Lisbon	LIVRE		L	26 March 2024		
Rodrigo Alves Taxa	Braga	Chega		CH	26 March 2024		
Daniel Teixeira	Setúbal	Chega		CH	26 March 2024		
Eduardo Teixeira	Viana do Castelo	Chega		CH	26 March 2024		
Marta Temido	Lisbon	Socialist Party		PS	26 March 2024		
Manuela Tender	Vila Real	Chega		CH	26 March 2024		
João Tilly	Viseu	Chega		CH	26 March 2024		
João Torres	Porto	Socialist Party		PS	26 March 2024		
Gonçalo Valente	Beja	Social Democratic Party	Democratic Alliance	PSD	26 March 2024		
Pedro Vaz	Lisbon	Socialist Party		PS	26 March 2024		
André Ventura	Lisbon	Chega		CH	26 March 2024		
Bruno Ventura	Lisbon	Social Democratic Party	Democratic Alliance	PSD	26 March 2024		
Francisco Sousa Vieira	Porto	Social Democratic Party	Democratic Alliance	PSD	26 March 2024		
Felicidade Vital	Lisbon	Chega		CH	26 March 2024		
Bruno Vitorino	Setúbal	Social Democratic Party	Democratic Alliance	PSD	26 March 2024		

== Temporary substitute members ==
Name	Constituency	Party	Alliance	Group	Took office	Left office	Substitute for
Davide Amado	Lisbon	Socialist Party		PS	26 March 2024		Mariana Vieira da Silva
Daniel Azenha	Coimbra	Socialist Party		PS	26 March 2024		Ana Abrunhosa
Carla Barros	Porto	Social Democratic Party	Democratic Alliance	PSD	26 March 2024		Óscar Afonso
Dora Brandão	Viana do Castelo	Socialist Party		PS	26 March 2024		José Costa
Sofia Canha	Madeira	Socialist Party		PS	26 March 2024		Paulo Cafôfo
Hugo Carvalho	Porto	Socialist Party		PS	26 March 2024		Isabel Oneto
Paulo Araújo Correia	Porto	Socialist Party		PS	26 March 2024		Manuel Pizarro
António Pedro Faria	Porto	Socialist Party		PS	26 March 2024		Eduardo Pinheiro
Ivan Gonçalves	Setúbal	Socialist Party		PS	26 March 2024		António Mendes
Fernando José	Setúbal	Socialist Party		PS	26 March 2024		Ana Catarina Mendonça Mendes
Sara Margarida Lobão	Porto	Socialist Party		PS	26 March 2024		João Paulo Correia
Ana Louro	Leiria	Socialist Party		PS	26 March 2024		Ana Sofia Antunes
Rita Borges Madeira	Lisbon	Socialist Party		PS	26 March 2024		Fernando Medina
António Monteirinho	Guarda	Socialist Party		PS	26 March 2024		Ana Godinho
Tiago Soares Monteiro	Castelo Branco	Socialist Party		PS	26 March 2024		Nuno Fazenda
Eduardo Oliveira	Braga	Socialist Party		PS	26 March 2024		José Luís Carneiro
Caroline Pereira	Bragança	Socialist Party		PS	26 March 2024		Isabel Ferreira
António Quintas	Viana do Castelo	Socialist Party		PS	26 March 2024		Marina Gonçalves
