= Party lists for the 2024 Portuguese legislative election =

Members of Parliament in the 2024 Portuguese legislative election will be elected in a closed list proportional representation system. Each constituency in Portugal elects a certain number of MPs depending on their number of registered voters. This number ranges from a minimum of 2 MPs in Portalegre to 48 in Lisbon. In this page, the names of the head candidates by party and/or coalition for each constituency will be listed. The leader of each party/coalition is displayed in bold.

== Heads of party lists ==
=== Parties represented in Parliament ===
Constituency	PS	AD	CH	IL	CDU	BE	PAN	L
Aveiro	**Pedro Nuno Santos**	Emídio Sousa	Jorge Galveias	Mário Amorim Lopes	Joana Dias	Moisés Ferreira	Ana Gonçalves	Joana Filipe
Beja	Nelson Brito	Gonçalo Valente	Diva Ribeiro	Ana Paula Pereira	João Dias	José Esteves	Luís Coentro	Fausto Camacho Fialho
Braga	José Luís Carneiro	Hugo Soares	Filipe Melo	**Rui Rocha**	Sandra Cardoso	Bruno Maia	Rafael Pinto	**Teresa Mota**
Bragança	Isabel Ferreira	Hernâni Dias	José Pires	Teresa Aguiar	Fátima Bento	Vítor Pimenta	Octávio Pires	Anabela Luciano Correia
Castelo Branco	Nuno Fazenda	Liliana Reis	João Ribeiro	Manuel Lemos	Jorge Fael	Inês Antunes	Ricardo Mota Nunes	João Barata Rodrigues
Coimbra	Ana Abrunhosa	Rita Júdice	António Pinto Pereira	Pedro Brinca	Fernando Teixeira	Miguel Cardina	João Costa	Clara Cruz Santos
Évora	Luís Dias	Sónia Ramos	Rui Cristina	Viviana Moita	Alma Rivera	Manuel Curado	Sérgio Neves	Glória Franco
Faro	Jamila Madeira	Miguel Pinto Luz	Pedro Pinto	Pedro Bettencourt	Catarina Marques	José Gusmão	Saúl Rosa	Rodrigo Teixeira
Guarda	Ana Mendes Godinho	Dulcineia Moura	Nuno Simões de Melo	Carlos Bernardo	José Pedro Branquinho	Beatriz Realinho	João Almeida	Margarida Bordalo
Leiria	Eurico Brilhante Dias	Telmo Faria	Gabriel Mithá Ribeiro	Miguel Silvestre	João Paulo Delgado	Rafael Henriques	Rodrigo Andrade	Inês Pires
Lisbon	Mariana Vieira da Silva	**Luís Montenegro**	**André Ventura**	Bernardo Blanco	**Paulo Raimundo**	**Mariana Mortágua**	**Inês Sousa Real**	**Rui Tavares**
Portalegre	Ricardo Pinheiro	Rogério Silva	Henrique de Freitas	João Leal da Costa	Fátima Dias	Rui Sousa	Telma Espírito Santo	João Ramos
Porto	Francisco Assis	Miguel Guimarães (Note: Nuno Melo, the leader of CDS–PP, is the second candidate of the list.)	Rui Afonso	Carlos Guimarães Pinto	Alfredo Maia	Marisa Matias	Anabela Castro	Jorge Pinto
Santarém	Alexandra Leitão	Eduardo Oliveira e Sousa	Pedro Frazão	João Seilá	Bernardino Soares	Bruno Góis	Vera Matos	Pedro Mendonça
Setúbal	Ana Catarina Mendes	Teresa Morais	Rita Matias	Joana Cordeiro	Paula Santos	Joana Mortágua	Alexandra Moreira	Paulo Muacho
Viana do Castelo	Marina Gonçalves	José Aguiar-Branco	Eduardo Teixeira	Marta Von Fridden	Joaquim Celestino Ribeiro	Adriana Temporão	Isabel Rhodes	Gonçalo Caseiro Pereira
Vila Real	Fátima Pinto	Amílcar Almeida	Manuela Tender	José Ventura	José Luís Ferreira	Vasco Valente Lopes	Rui Oliveira	Mila Simões de Abreu
Viseu	Elza Pais	António Leitão Amaro	João Tilly	Hélio Marta	Alexandre Hoffmann Castela	José Miguel Lopes	Carolina Pia	Luís Marques
Azores	Francisco César	Paulo Moniz	Miguel Arruda	José Luís Parreira	Judite Barros da Costa	Joana Bettencourt	Dinarte Pimentel	José Manuel Azevedo
Madeira	Paulo Cafôfo	Pedro Coelho	Francisco Gomes	Gonçalo Maia Camelo	Sílvia Vasconcelos	Dina Letra	Marco Gonçalves	Carlos Andrade
Europe	Paulo Pisco	Carlos Alberto Gonçalves	José Dias Fernandes	João Cotrim de Figueiredo	Joana Carvalho	Rita Nóbrega	Paulo Vieira de Castro	Tiago Correia
Outside Europe	Augusto Santos Silva	José Cesário	Manuel Magno	Teresa Vaz Antunes	Ana Oliveira	Miguel Heleno	Nelson Abreu	Nurin Mirzan
Sources								

=== Parties not represented in Parliament ===
While all parties represented in Parliament will run in every constituency, only React, Include, Recycle, the National Democratic Alternative and Rise up! will do so. Socialist Alternative Movement (MAS) list for Lisbon was rejected by the Courts.

Constituency	RIR	PCTP	ADN	JPP	A21	VP	~~MAS~~	E	NC	PTP	ND	PPM
Aveiro	Alcino Ferreira	Alexandre Caldeira	Inês Bastos	—N/a	Álvaro Lopes	Rui Marques	—N/a	Anselmo Oliveira	—N/a	—N/a	Kaly Major	—N/a
Beja	Ricardo Mendes	Maria Pinto	António Arantes	—N/a	—N/a	Iris Lá Féria	—N/a	Cristina Chalaça	—N/a	—N/a	José Pedro Maciel	—N/a
Braga	Maria Rocha	Maria Ferreira	Gonçalo Bandeira	João Horta	José Cunha	Miguel Amador	—N/a	Bruno Rebelo	Délio Pinto Lopes	—N/a	Luís Arezes	—N/a
Bragança	Damiana Fonseca	—N/a	Vanda Martins	—N/a	Maria Carvalho	—N/a	—N/a	Luís Gomes Luís	—N/a	—N/a	Maria Cecília Pereira	—N/a
Castelo Branco	José da Paz	José Marrucho	Anabela Rodrigues	—N/a	—N/a	Daniel Santana	—N/a	Jorge Torres	—N/a	—N/a	Armindo Vaz	—N/a
Coimbra	Inês Talufa	—N/a	António Travanca Pela	Álvaro Martins	João Afonso	Carlos Leite	—N/a	Miguel Costa Marques	—N/a	—N/a	Joana Bento Rodrigues	—N/a
Évora	Carlos Dias	—N/a	Humberto Baião	—N/a	Hugo Duarte	Hélder Machado	—N/a	Carla Ribeiro	—N/a	—N/a	Vítor Grade	—N/a
Faro	Rui Curado	—N/a	Anabela Morais	Leonardo Reis	—N/a	Yannick Schade	—N/a	Fábio Fatal	—N/a	—N/a	Maria Antunes	—N/a
Guarda	Cristiana da Silva	—N/a	Francisco Monteiro	—N/a	Telmo Reis	Olivier Carneiro	—N/a	Carlos Teles	—N/a	—N/a	Luís Coutinho	—N/a
Leiria	Rui Maurício	—N/a	Nuno Barroso	—N/a	José Serralheiro	Mágui Lage	—N/a	João Pais Amaral	—N/a	—N/a	Luís Pires	—N/a
Lisbon	**Márcia Henriques**	João Pinto (Note: Cidália Guerreiro, the leader of PCTP/MRPP, is the second candidate of the list.)	**Bruno Fialho**	João Ribeiro	Nuno Afonso	Inês Bravo Figueiredo	**~~Renata Cambra~~**	**José Pinto Coelho**	—N/a	José Manuel Coelho	**Ossanda Liber**	—N/a
Portalegre	Emanuel Martins	António Corricas	Jorge Ângelo	—N/a	Fábio Carvalho	João Fernandes	—N/a	José Utra Pinto Coelho	—N/a	—N/a	Paulo Caldeira	—N/a
Porto	Vitorino Silva	António Silva	Nuno Pereira	Ana Teixeira	—N/a	Daniel Gaio	—N/a	Orlando Cruz	Eduardo Loureiro	—N/a	Sofia Perestrello	—N/a
Santarém	Lina Carvalho	—N/a	Cláudio Batista	—N/a	**Pedro Soares Pimenta**	Daniel Nobre	—N/a	Luís Morais	—N/a	—N/a	Rita Costa	—N/a
Setúbal	Ana Paula Freitas	Nuno da Silva	Maria Oliveira	Luís Ribeiro	**Jorge Nuno de Sá**	Susana Carneiro	—N/a	Carlos Pagará	—N/a	Mário Nogueira	Ricardo Amaral	—N/a
Viana do Castelo	Luísa Aguiar	—N/a	Renato Silva	—N/a	Fernando Silva	Vladimiro Osório	—N/a	Diogo Casanova	—N/a	—N/a	Sónia Cardoso	—N/a
Vila Real	António Oliveira	—N/a	Ana Ramos	—N/a	—N/a	João Carmona	—N/a	Júlio Quinteira	—N/a	—N/a	Sandra Granja	—N/a
Viseu	Luís Lourenço	—N/a	Maria Fernanda Modesto	—N/a	João Lopes	Tânia Campos	—N/a	Vítor Ramalho	—N/a	—N/a	Teresa Braga	—N/a
Azores	João Henriques	—N/a	Rui Matos	Mário Rui Pacheco	—N/a	Dino Castelo Branco	—N/a	Roque Almeida	—N/a	—N/a	—N/a	—N/a
Madeira	Joana Mendes	—N/a	Miguel Pita	Filipe Sousa	Miguel Silva	Vítor Ferreira	—N/a	Isabel Montalvão e Silva	António Santos	Raquel Coelho	—N/a	Paulo Brito
Europe	Orlando Correia	José Carlos Sousa	Davide Pereira	**Élvio Sousa**	José Inácio Faria	Carmén Sonnberg	—N/a	Patrícia Manguinhas	Patrício Leite	—N/a	Pedro Borges Godinho	—N/a
Outside Europe	Maria Alexandra Amaro	—N/a	Paulo Nunes	José Catarina	José Ascenço	Leandro Damasceno	—N/a	Jorge de Almeida	Mikael Fernandes	—N/a	Mário Guterres	—N/a
Sources												

== Elected candidates ==
=== Aveiro ===
==== Democratic Alliance ====
- Emídio Sousa
- Silvério Regalado
- Ângela Almeida
- Salvador Malheiro
- Almiro Moreira
- Paula Cardoso
- Paulo Cavaleiro

==== Socialist Party ====
- Pedro Nuno Santos
- Cláudia Cruz Santos
- Carlos Neto Brandão
- Hugo Oliveira
- Susana Correia

==== Chega ====
- Jorge Valsassina Galveias
- Maria José Aguiar
- Armando Grave

==== Liberal Initiative ====
- Mário Amorim Lopes

=== Beja ===
==== Socialist Party ====
- Nelson Brito

==== Chega ====
- Diva Ribeiro

==== Democratic Alliance ====
- Gonçalo Valente

=== Braga ===
==== Democratic Alliance ====
- Hugo Soares
- Ricardo Araújo
- Clara Marques Mendes
- Jorge Paulo Oliveira
- Emídio Guerreiro
- Ana Santos
- Carlos Eduardo Reis
- Carlos Cação

==== Socialist Party ====
- José Luís Carneiro
- Palmira Maciel
- Pedro Miguel Sousa
- Ricardo Costa
- Irene Costa
- Gilberto Anjos

==== Chega ====
- Filipe Melo
- Rodrigo Alves Taxa
- Vanessa Barata
- Carlos Alberto Pinto

==== Liberal Initiative ====
- Rui Rocha

=== Bragança ===
==== Democratic Alliance ====
- Hernâni Dias
- Nuno Gonçalves

==== Socialist Party ====
- Isabel Ferreira

=== Castelo Branco ===
==== Socialist Party ====
- Nuno Fazenda
- Patrícia Caixinha

==== Democratic Alliance ====
- Liliana Ferreira

==== Chega ====
- João Ribeiro

=== Coimbra ===
==== Socialist Party ====
- Ana Abrunhosa
- Pedro Coimbra
- Ricardo Lino
- Raquel Ferreira

==== Democratic Alliance ====
- Rita Júdice
- Maurício Marques
- Martim Syder

==== Chega ====
- António Pinto Pereira
- Eliseu Neves

=== Évora ===
==== Socialist Party ====
- Luís Dias

==== Democratic Alliance ====
- Sónia Ramos

==== Chega ====
- Rui Cristina

=== Faro ===
==== Chega ====
- Pedro Soares Pinto
- João Graça
- Sandra Ribeiro

==== Socialist Party ====
- Jamila Madeira
- Jorge Botelho
- Luís Graça Nunes

==== Democratic Alliance ====
- Miguel Pinto Luz
- Cristóvão Norte
- Ofélia Ramos

=== Guarda ===
==== Democratic Alliance ====
- Dulcineia Moura

==== Socialist Party ====
- Ana Mendes Godinho

==== Chega ====
- Nuno Simões de Melo

=== Leiria ===
==== Democratic Alliance ====
- Telmo Faria
- Hugo Patrício Oliveira
- Sofia Carreira
- João Paulo Santos
- Ricardo Carvalho

==== Socialist Party ====
- Eurico Brilhante Dias
- Ana Sofia Antunes
- Walter Chicharro

==== Chega ====
- Gabriel Mithá Ribeiro
- Luís Paulo Fernandes

=== Lisbon ===
==== Socialist Party ====
- Mariana Vieira da Silva
- Marcos Perestrello
- Fernando Medina
- Marta Temido
- Pedro Delgado Alves
- Sérgio Sousa Pinto
- Edite Estrela
- Miguel Cabrita
- Pedro Vaz
- Ana Bernardo
- Carlos João Pereira
- Isabel Moreira
- Ricardo Lima
- Maria Begonha
- André Rijo

==== Democratic Alliance ====
- Luís Montenegro
- Joaquim Miranda Sarmento
- Ana Paula Martins
- Paulo Núncio
- João Vale e Azevedo
- Sandra Pereira
- Bruno Ventura
- Alexandre Homem Cristo
- Margarida Saavedra
- Alexandre Poço
- Gonçalo Lage
- Eva Brás Pinho
- Marco Claudino
- Luís Newton

==== Chega ====
- André Ventura
- Rui Paulo Sousa
- Marta Martins da Silva
- Pedro Pessanha
- Ricardo Dias Pinto
- Felicidade Vital
- Bruno Nunes
- Madalena Cordeiro
- José Barreira Soares

==== Liberal Initiative ====
- Bernardo Blanco
- Mariana Leitão
- Rodrigo Saraiva

==== Livre ====
- Rui Tavares
- Isabel Mendes Lopes

==== Left Bloc ====
- Mariana Mortágua
- Fabian Figueiredo

==== Unitary Democratic Coalition ====
- Paulo Raimundo
- António Filipe

==== People Animals Nature ====
- Inês Sousa Real

=== Portalegre ===
==== Socialist Party ====
- Ricardo Pinheiro

==== Chega ====
- Henrique de Freitas

=== Porto ===
==== Democratic Alliance ====
- Miguel Guimarães
- Nuno Melo
- Germana Rocha
- Óscar Afonso
- Alberto Machado
- Andreia Neto
- Pedro Roque
- Francisco Lopes
- Olga Freire
- Hugo Carneiro
- Alberto Fonseca
- Ana Gabriela Cabilhas
- Pedro Sousa
- Francisco Sousa Vieira

==== Socialist Party ====
- Francisco Assis
- Rosário Gambôa
- Manuel Pizarro
- João Torres
- Patrícia Ribeiro Faro
- João Paulo Correia
- Isabel Oneto
- Tiago Barbosa Ribeiro
- Joana Ferreira Lima
- Eduardo Pinheiro
- José Carlos Barbosa
- Isabel Andrade
- Carlos Alberto Braz

==== Chega ====
- Rui Afonso
- Diogo Pacheco de Amorim
- Cristina Rodrigues
- José António Carvalho
- Marcus Santos
- Sónia Monteiro
- Raul Melo

==== Liberal Initiative ====
- Carlos Guimarães Pinto
- Patrícia Gilvaz

==== Left Bloc ====
- Marisa Matias
- José Soeiro

==== Livre ====
- Jorge Pinto

==== Unitary Democratic Coalition ====
- Alfredo Maia

=== Santarém ===
==== Socialist Party ====
- Alexandra Leitão
- Hugo Costa
- Mara Lagriminha

==== Democratic Alliance ====
- Eduardo Oliveira e Sousa
- João Moura
- Isaura Morais

==== Chega ====
- Pedro Frazão
- Pedro Correia
- Luísa Areosa

=== Setúbal ===
==== Socialist Party ====
- Ana Catarina Mendes
- Miguel Costa Matos
- António Mendonça Mendes
- Eurídice Pereira
- André Pinotes Baptista
- João Paulo Rebelo
- Clarisse Campos

==== Chega ====
- Rita Matias
- Patrícia Carvalho
- Nuno Gabriel
- Daniel Teixeira

==== Democratic Alliance ====
- Teresa Morais
- Paulo Ribeiro
- Bruno Vitorino
- Sonia dos Reis

==== Unitary Democratic Coalition ====
- Paula Santos

==== Left Bloc ====
- Joana Mortágua

==== Liberal Initiative ====
- Joana Cordeiro

==== Livre ====
- Paulo Muacho

=== Viana do Castelo ===
==== Democratic Alliance ====
- José Aguiar-Branco
- Emília Cerqueira

==== Socialist Party ====
- Marina Gonçalves
- José Maria Costa

==== Chega ====
- Eduardo Teixeira

=== Vila Real ===
==== Democratic Alliance ====
- Amílcar Almeida
- António Machado

==== Socialist Party ====
- Fátima Correia Pinto
- Carlos Matos da Silva

==== Chega ====
- Manuela Tender

=== Viseu ===
==== Democratic Alliance ====
- António Leitão Amaro
- Pedro Alves
- Inês Domingos

==== Socialist Party ====
- Elza Pais
- José Rui Cruz
- João Azevedo

==== Chega ====
- João Tilly
- Bernardo Pessanha

=== Azores ===
==== Democratic Alliance ====
- Paulo Moniz
- Francisco Pimentel

==== Socialist Party ====
- Francisco César
- Sérgio Ávila

==== Chega ====
- Miguel Arruda

=== Madeira ===
==== Madeira First ====
- Pedro Coelho
- Paula Margarido
- Paulo Neves

==== Socialist Party ====
- Paulo Cafôfo
- José Iglésias

==== Chega ====
- Francisco Gomes

=== Europe ===
==== Chega ====
- José Dias Fernandes

==== Socialist Party ====
- Paulo Pisco

=== Outside Europe ===
==== Democratic Alliance ====
- José Cesário

==== Chega ====
- Manuel Magno

== See also ==
- List of political parties in Portugal
- Party lists for the 2019 Portuguese legislative election
- Party lists for the 2022 Portuguese legislative election
- Party lists for the 2025 Portuguese legislative election
