= Filipe Melo =

Filipe Melo may refer to:

- Filipe Melo (writer) (born 1977), Portuguese musician, film director and comic book writer
- Filipe Melo (footballer) (born 1989), Portuguese footballer
- Filipe Melo (politician) (born 1981), Portuguese politician

== See also ==
- Felipe Melo
