= Alexandra Vieira =

Portuguese politician and teacher (born 1966)

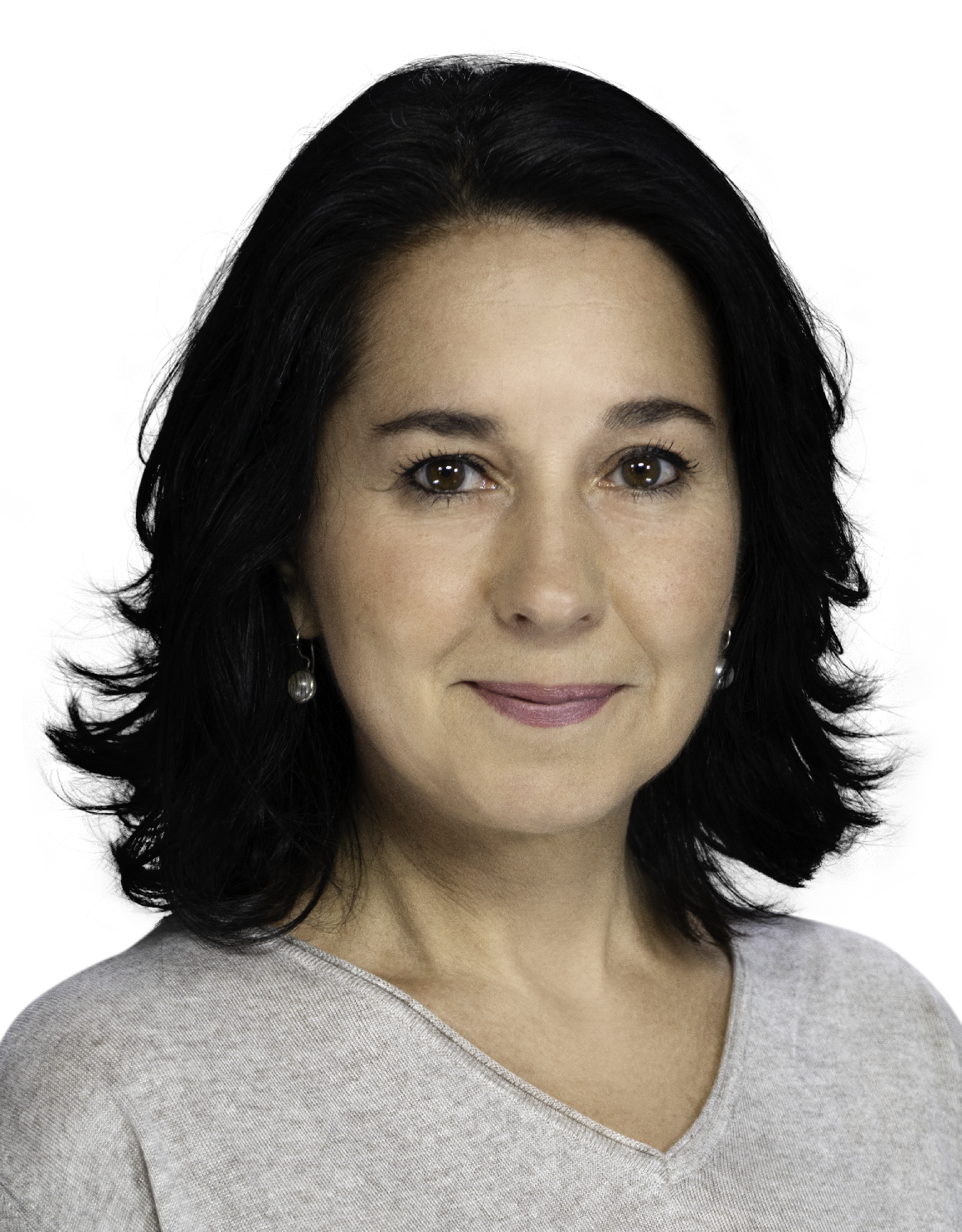
- Alexandra Vieira

Member of the Assembly of the Republic of Portugal
- In office 25 October 2019 – 29 March 2022
- Constituency: Braga

Member of the Braga Municipal Chamber
- In office 2017–2021

Personal details
- Born: 29 September 1966 (age 60)
- Party: Left Bloc
- Education: University of Minho
- Occupation: Politician, schoolteacher

Maria Alexandra Nogueira Vieira (European Portuguese: [mɐˈɾi.ɐ ɐ.lɨˈʃɐ̃.dɾɐ nuˈɡɐj.ɾɐ ˈvjɐj.ɾɐ]; born 29 September 1966) is a schoolteacher and politician. She was a member of the Member of the Assembly of the Republic of Portugal from 2019 to 2022, representing the constituency of Braga, consisting of the Braga District. From 2017 to 2021, Vieira was a councillor in Braga. She is a member of the Left Bloc party.

== Biography ==
Maria Alexandra Nogueira Vieira was born on 29 September 1966. She graduated from the University of Minho in Braga, Portugal, with a bachelor's degree in history, and a master's degree in sociology of education and educational policies. She works as a history teacher in Braga. From 2017 to 2024, she has been the leader of the Union of the Teachers of the North.

Vieira belongs to the Left Bloc party, and its national and regional boards of directors. From 2017 to 2021, she was a member of the Braga Municipal Chamber. From 25 October 2019 to 28 March 2022, she was a member of the Assembly of the Republic of Portugal, representing the constituency of Braga, consisting of the Braga District. She belonged to the Foreign Affairs Committee, the Youth and Sports Committee, and the Culture and Communications Committee.

In 2021 and 2025, she unsuccessfully ran for a seat in the Braga Municipal Chamber. In the 2021 election, she was simultaneously placed first on the Left Bloc electoral list, making her a candidate for the office of the mayor of Braga. In 2024, she unsuccessfully ran for a seat in the Assembly of the Republic from the constituency of Braga.
