= António Marques Mendes =

Portuguese lawyer and politician

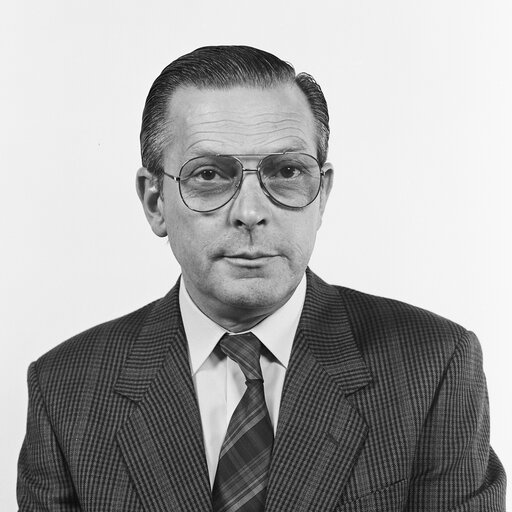
- Official portrait, 1987

Mayor of Fafe
- In office 17 December 1989 – 14 December 1997
- Preceded by: José de Lemos
- Succeeded by: Raul Gomes

Member of the European Parliament for Portugal
- In office 14 September 1987 – 18 July 1994

Member of the Assembly of the Republic
- In office 8 June 1983 – 26 October 1995
- Constituency: Braga
- In office 29 July 1976 – 5 October 1980
- Constituency: Braga

Personal details
- Born: António Joaquim Bastos Marques Mendes; 30 March 1934 Porto, Portugal
- Died: 15 June 2015 (aged 81) Porto, Portugal
- Party: Social Democratic Party
- Other political affiliations: Independent Social Democratic Action (formerly)
- Spouse: Maria Isabel Gonçalves (m. 1956)
- Children: 4, including Luís and Clara
- Education: University of Coimbra
- Occupation: Lawyer • Politician

António Joaquim Bastos Marques Mendes (30 March 1934 – 15 June 2015) was a Portuguese lawyer and politician.

== Background ==
He was born in Porto, Paranhos, a son of Joaquim Marques Mendes (Fornos de Algodres, Figueiró da Granja, 3 March 1892 – Porto, Paranhos, 19 January 1941), Director of Services in the Correios, Telégrafos e Telefones, and wife (m. Fafe, São Romão de Arões, 20 April 1933) Antónia Pereira da Costa Bastos (Fafe, São Romão de Arões, 18 December 1904 – Fafe, São Romão de Arões, 2 October 1990). He died in Porto in 2015.

== Career ==
He is a Licentiate in Law from the Faculty of Law of the University of Coimbra.

He started his career as a lawyer.

Among other things he was a Co-Founder and a Member of the Social Democratic Party together with Francisco Sá Carneiro, Francisco Pinto Balsemão, Joaquim Magalhães Mota, Carlos Mota Pinto, João Bosco Mota Amaral, Alberto João Jardim and António Barbosa de Melo of then Popular Democratic Party. He was Mayor of the Municipal Chamber of Fafe, Deputy to the Portuguese Assembly of the Republic and also a member of the European Parliament.

== Family ==
He married at Fafe, São Romão de Arões, on 29 November 1956 Maria Isabel Gonçalves, born in Fafe, Cepães, on 10 July 1933, an Elementary School teacher, daughter of Gervásio Gonçalves (Fafe, Cepães, Carreira, 1 June 1905 – Guimarães, Creixomil, 19 May 1993), an Industrialist, and first wife (m. Felgueiras, Felgueiras, 25 June 1928) Isabel Teixeira (Felgueiras, Jugueiras, 11 October 1902 – 22 August 1980). They are the parents of Luís Marques Mendes.
