= Paulo Lopes Silva =

Portuguese engineer and politician

Member of the Assembly of the Republic
- Incumbent
- Assumed office 3 June 2025
- Constituency: Braga

Personal details
- Born: Paulo Rui Lopes Pereira da Silva; 10 September 1987 (age 38) Guimarães, Braga District, Portugal
- Party: Socialist Party
- Occupation: Politician

Paulo Rui Lopes Pereira da Silva (born 10 September 1987) is a Portuguese engineer and politician, who is a member of the Assembly of the Republic since 2025.

He was a member of the Guimarães City Council from 2021 until the 2025 legislative election, when he was elected as a deputy.

He was the national campaign director of António José Seguro's 2026 presidential campaign. After Seguro's victory, he succeeded Seguro as the chairman of UPortugal, a movement founded by Seguro to promote a greater participation from citizens and fighting misinformation.
