= Nogueira de Brito =

Portuguese politician (1938–2026)

José Luís Nogueira de Brito

Member of the Assembly of the Republic of Portugal for Braga
- In office 31 May 1983 – 26 October 1995

Personal details
- Born: José Luís Nogueira de Brito; 13 January 1938 Barcelos, Portugal
- Died: 4 February 2026 (aged 88)
- Party: CDS – People's Party
- Education: University of Coimbra (Lic.)
- Occupation: Lawyer

José Luís Nogueira de Brito (13 January 1938 – 4 February 2026) was a Portuguese politician. A member of the CDS – People's Party, he served in the Assembly of the Republic from 1983 to 1995.

De Brito died on 4 February 2026, at the age of 88.
