= Francisca Almeida =

Portuguese former politician and lawyer

Deputy of the Assembly of the Republic of Portugal
- In office 2009–2015
- Parliamentary group: Social Democratic Party
- Constituency: Braga

Personal details
- Born: Maria Francisca Fernandes de Almeida; 6 November 1983 (age 42) Guimarães, Portugal
- Party: Portuguese: Social Democratic Party
- Education: Catholic University of Portugal
- Occupation: Lawyer

Francisca Almeida (born 1983) is a Portuguese lawyer and politician. As a member of the Social Democratic Party, she represented the Braga constituency in the 11th and 12th legislatures of the Assembly of the Republic of Portugal, between 2009 and 2015.

== Early life ==
Maria Francisca Fernandes de Almeida was born in Guimarães in the north of Portugal on 6 November 1983. She is the daughter of Paulo Vasques Rodrigues de Almeida, an economist, and Vanda Maria de Freitas Fernandes. Almeida graduated in law from the Faculty of Law of the Porto campus of the Catholic University of Portugal in 2006. After graduating she practised as a lawyer and became a member of the board of the Porto District board of the National Association of Young Portuguese Lawyers (ANJAP). She obtained a master's in 2015 from the same university.

== Political career ==
Almeida joined Portugal's Social Democratic Party and was subsequently elected as a deputy in the Guimarães Municipal Assembly. She was then elected as a deputy to the Assembly of the Republic in the XI and XII Legislatures, representing Braga. She became a vice-president of the PSD Parliamentary Group and belonged to the Parliamentary Commission for the monitoring of corruption. She was also on the Parliamentary Committee investigating the State's relationship with the Media, and on the Parliamentary Health Committee.

In 2014 she was required to resign her position on a parliamentary inquiry on military equipment, after members of the Portuguese Socialist Party (PS) pointed out that the law firm she worked for advised the State and she thus had a conflict of interest. In 2015 she announced that she would not be running in the national elections of that year as she wanted more time to dedicate to her career. While in the National Assembly, Almeida made frequent appearances on the television channel TVI 24 programme Política Mesmo. Similarly, she wrote regular columns for the Expresso newspaper. Both of these activities ceased when she left parliament.

== Publications ==
In 2016, a book by Almeida, O Poder de Resolução de Litígios entre Regulados pelas Autoridades Reguladoras Independentes (The Power to Settle Disputes between Regulated by Independent Regulatory Authorities), was published by the Catholic University. The slowness of courts coupled with the technical nature of legal disputes led to the decision to allow independent regulatory authorities (ARIs) the power to resolve disputes. The Law has come to expressly recognize mediation as a mechanism for resolving disputes by an ARI. The book explores the place of mediation within the power of ARIs to resolve disputes. It also seeks to be a guide for the use of mediation.
