= Leandro Ferreira Luís =

Portuguese politician

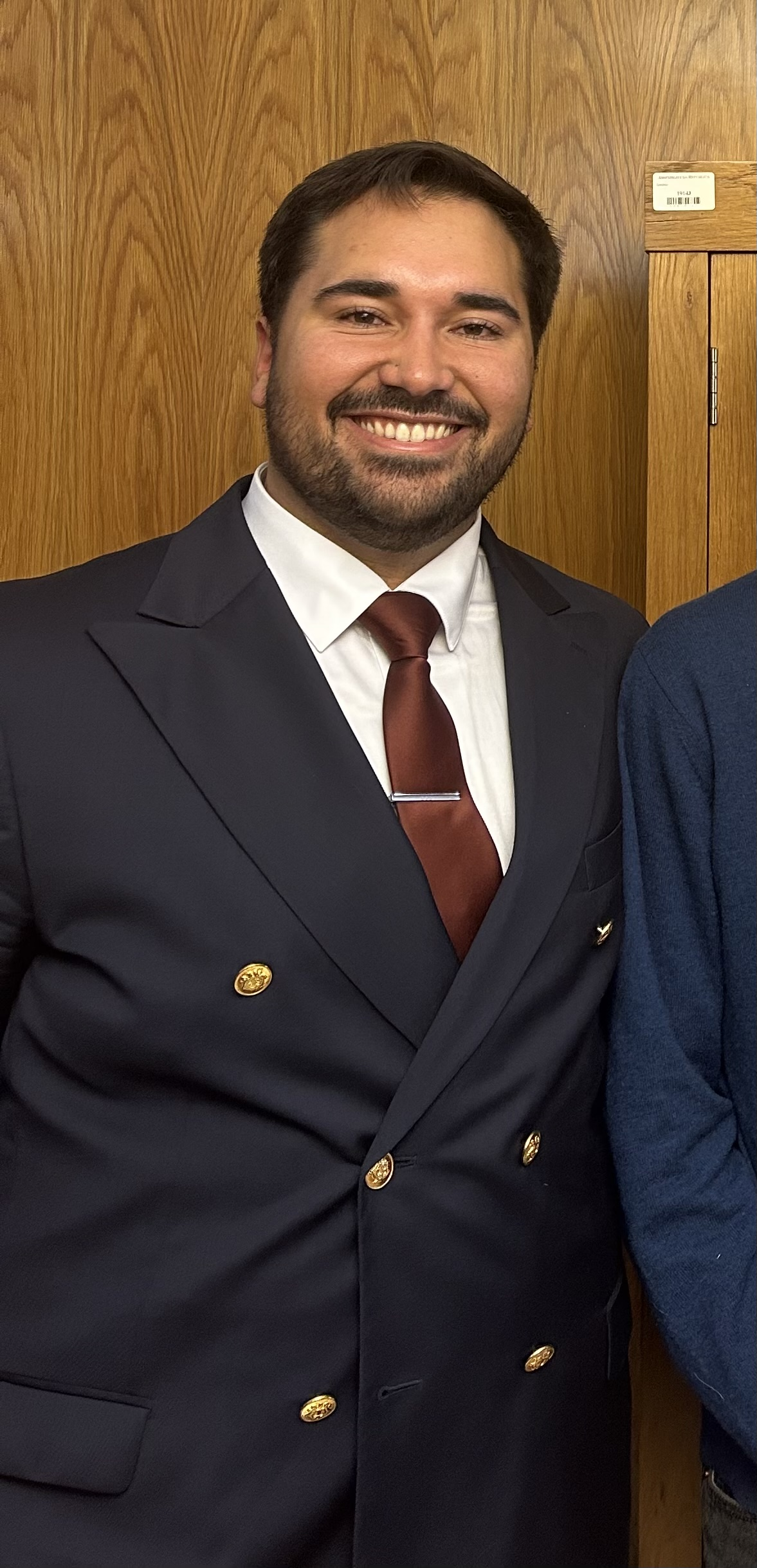
- Leandro Ferreira Luís in December 2025

Member of the Assembly of the Republic
- Incumbent
- Assumed office 27 October 2025
- Constituency: Braga

Personal details
- Born: Leandro Ferreira Luís; 25 March 1999 (age 27) Martim, Barcelos, Portugal
- Party: Social Democratic Party
- Other political affiliations: Vice-president of the Social Democratic Youth
- Occupation: Politician

Leandro Ferreira Luís (born 25 March 1999) is a Portuguese politician, current vice president of the national Social Democratic Youth and president of this institution's Braga District branch. He is also a member of the Assembly of the Republic since the 2025 local elections, succeeding Ricardo Araújo after the latter left Parliament to assume the office of mayor and president of the City Council of Guimarães.
