= Elisabete Matos =

Portuguese singer, artistic director and politician

Elisabete Matos GOIH OIH
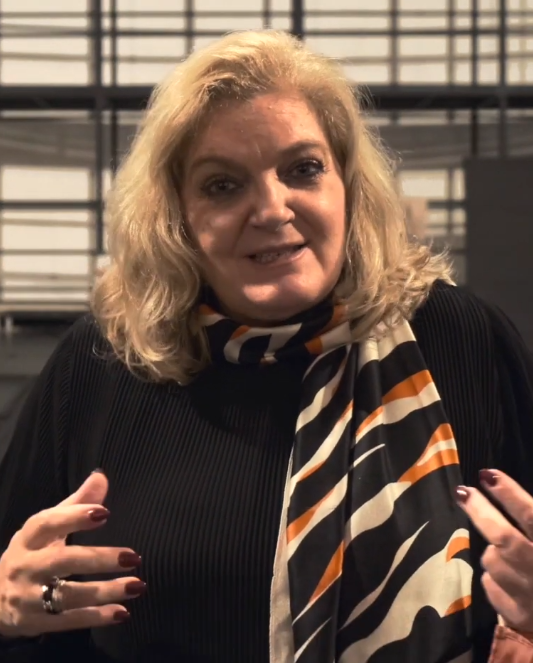
- Matos in 2021

Member of the Assembly of the Republic
- In office 29 March 2022 – 25 March 2024
- Constituency: Braga

Artistic Director of São Carlos National Theatre
- Incumbent
- Assumed office 1 October 2019

Personal details
- Born: 6 September 1964 (age 61) Caldas das Taipas, Guimarães, Portugal

Maria Elisabete da Silva Duarte Matos GOIH OIH (born 6 September 1964) is a Portuguese soprano and politician. In January 2022 she was elected to the Portuguese Assembly of the Republic as a member of the Socialist Party, representing the Braga constituency.

== Biography ==
Elisabete Matos was born in 1964 in Caldas das Taipas, Guimarães, Portugal and she began her first musical studies in at the Conservatório de Música Calouste Gulbenkian de Braga. Firstly she started to study violin and then singing, alongside.

After she finished the Conservatory, Matos won a scholarship from the renowned Calouste Gulbenkian Foundation which allowed her to finish her studies in Madrid, Spain.

A second place in a European Singing Contest made her be noticed and her international career was launched by the roles of Donna Elvira in Mozart's opera Don Giovanni and Alice Ford from Verdi's Falstaff at the Hamburg Opera.

Shortly after that, in the year of 1997, she made a triumphal debut in Madrid at the reopening of the Teatro Real as an opera house, interpreting the leading role of Marigaila in the opening of Divinas Palabras, by Antón García Abril, with Plácido Domingo in the tenor part. Her performance impressed him very much and he invited her to sing with him Massenet's Le Cid (Chimène) and Dolly from Sly, by Ermanno Wolf-Ferrari with José Carreras.

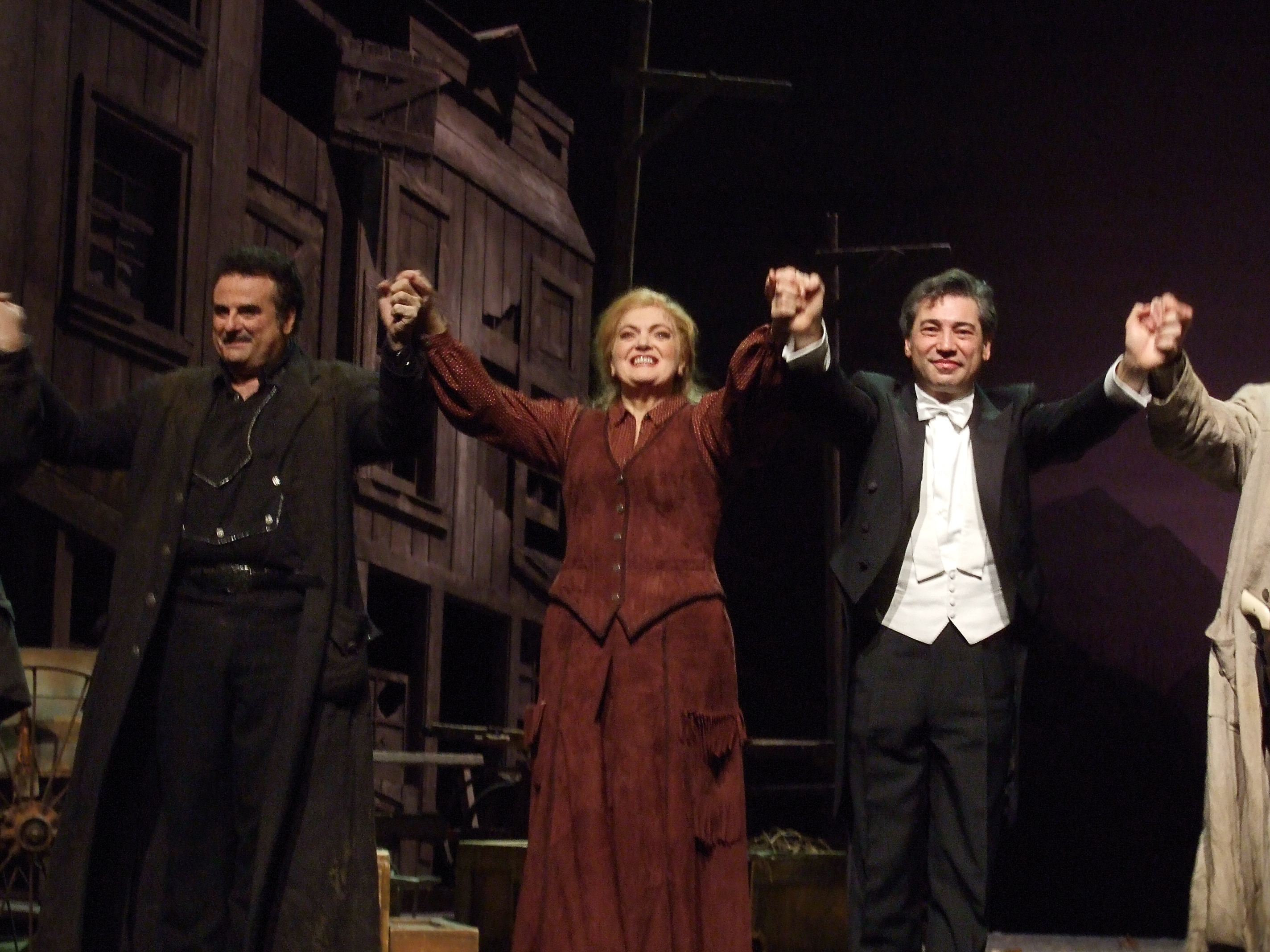
Elisabete Matos in La Fanciulla del West in December 2010

After all these successes, Elisabete Matos has sung in many major opera houses around the world, like the Gran Teatre del Liceu, La Fenice, Teatro Nacional de São Carlos (Lisbon), Teatro Real, La Scala, Maestranza de Sevilla, Teatro Regio di Torino and the Teatro di San Carlo (Naples). She has made appearances too at the Macerata Festival and the Mérida Festival, Japan, Washington, Chicago and all around Spain.

In 2001, Matos participated in the commemorations of the centenary of Giuseppe Verdi's death, singing again with Plácido Domingo, José Carreras and other names, under the musical direction of Zubin Mehta, in Rome.

In January 2009 she sang the title role of La Gioconda in Tokyo for the Fujiwara Opera.

Elisabete Matos portrayed Minnie in two performances of Puccini's La Fanciulla del West at the Metropolitan Opera during the 2010–2011 season.

In 2019 it was announced that Matos would become the artistic director of Lisbon's Teatro Nacional de São Carlos.

== Repertory ==
A lirico-spinto soprano, Elisabete Matos owns a large voice capable of a dramatic intensity with a timbre of sheer beauty. Her most performed composers are Puccini and Wagner, but she has also sung the works of many others, counting more than fifty roles in her repertory.

=== Roles in opera ===
- Norma, Norma (Bellini)
- Cassandre from Les Troyens (Berlioz)
- Micaela from Carmen (Bizet)
- Dolores in La Dolores (Bretón)
- Margarita, Margarita la Tornera (Chapí)
- Salud, La Vida Breve (Falla)
- Marigailla, Divinas Palabras (García Abril)
- Iphigénie, Iphigénie en Tauride (Gluck)
- Rosa, Gaudí (Joan Guinjoan)
- La del Alba, Don Quijote (Halffeter)
- Kátja, Kátja Kabanowá (Janáček)
- Zazà, Zazà (Leoncavallo)
- Santuzza, Cavalleria rusticana (Mascagni)
- Chiméne, Le Cid (Massenet)
- Donna Elvira, Don Giovanni (Mozart)
- Contessa, Le nozze di Figaro (Mozart)
- Ermissende, Els Pirineus (Pedrell)
- Mimí, La Bohème (Puccini)
- Minnie, La fanciulla del West (Puccini)
- Tosca, Tosca (Puccini)
- Suor Angelica, Suor Angelica (Puccini)
- Principessa Turandot, Turandot (Puccini)
- Gioconda, La Gioconda (Ponchelli)
- Madame Lidoine, Dialogues des Carmélites (Poulanc)
- Contessa, Capriccio (Strauss)
- Abigaille, Nabucco (Verdi)
- Elisabetta, Don Carlo (Verdi)
- Amelia, Simón Boccanegra (Verdi)
- Lida, La Battaglia di Legnano (Verdi)
- Amelia, Gustavo III (Verdi)
- Amelia, Ballo in maschera (Verdi)
- Leonora, Il trovatore (Verdi)
- Alice Ford, Falstaff (Verdi)
- Sieglinde, Die Walküre (Wagner)
- Senta, Der Fliegende Holänder (Wagner)
- Freia, Das Rheingold (Wagner)
- Elsa, Lohengrin (Wagner)
- Isolde, Tristan und Isolde (Wagner)
- Gutrune und Dritte Norn, Götterdämmerung (Wagner)
- Elisabeth, Tanhäuser (Wagner)
- Dolly, Sly (Wolf-Ferrari)

=== Recordings ===
- La Dolores (Tomás Bretón), with Elisabete Matos, Plácido Domingo, Tito Beltrán, Conductor Antoni Ros Marbá, DECCA (winner of the 2000 Latin Grammy for Best Classical Album)
- Requiem (Suppé), with Elisabete Matos, César Hernández, Giorgio Cebrian and the Orchestra and Corus of the Calouste Gulbenkian Foundation, Conductor Michel Corboz VIRGIN
- Les Troyens (Berlioz), with Elisabete matos (Cassandre), Lance Ryan (Énée), Daniele Barcellona (Didon), Gabriele Viviani (Chorèbe), Cor de la Generalitat Valenciana, Orquestra de la Comunitat Valenciana, conducted by Valery Gergiev, stage Director Corlus Podrisso. DVD Unitel Classica 2010 - 2011.

== Distinctions ==
=== National orders ===
- Grand Officer of the Order of Prince Henry the Navigator (7 June 2013)
- Officer of the Order of Prince Henry the Navigator (8 March 1999)
