= Miguel Guimarães =

Portuguese politician and doctor

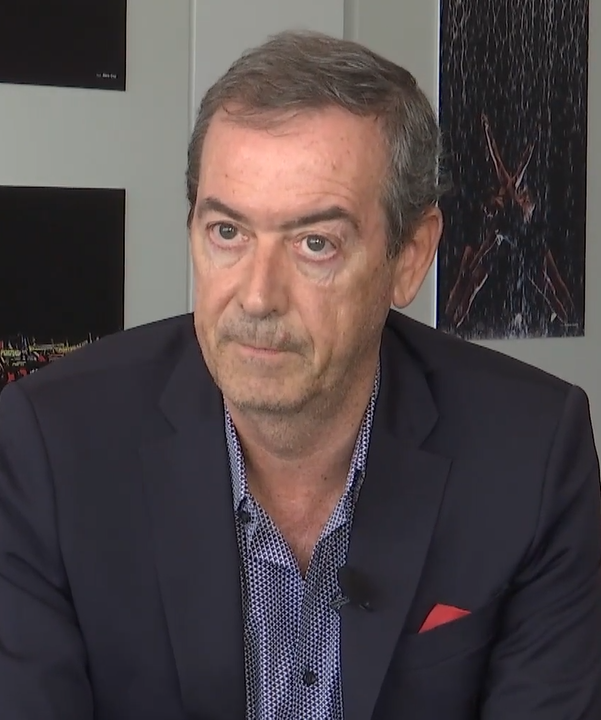
- Guimarães in 2022

Member of the Assembly of the Republic
- Incumbent
- Assumed office 26 March 2024
- Constituency: Porto

President of the Order of Physicians
- In office 23 January 2017 – 16 February 2023
- Preceded by: José Manuel Silva
- Succeeded by: Carlos Cortes

President of the Northern Regional Council of the Order of Physicians
- In office 29 January 2011 – 23 January 2017

Personal details
- Born: José Miguel Ribeiro de Castro Guimarães; 22 January 1962 (age 64) Porto, Portugal
- Party: Independent
- Other political affiliations: Democratic Alliance (2024–present)
- Education: University of Porto
- Occupation: Doctor • Politician

José Miguel Ribeiro de Castro Guimarães (born 22 January 1962) is a Portuguese doctor and politician. He has a degree in Medicine from the Faculty of Medicine of the University of Porto and a specialist in Urology (since 1997) at Centro Hospitalar São João (CHSJ).

He has been a member of the transplant team at Hospital de S. João since 1994, having participated in more than 400 kidney transplant surgeries. In 2005, he obtained the Competence in Health Services Management from the Ordem dos Médicos.

He organized more than 30 scientific and professional meetings and as a researcher published more than a hundred research works in national and international journals in the field of Urology.

He was president of the Northern Regional Council of the Order of Physicians (2011-2017). He was president of the Order of Physicians, between 2017 and 2023.

In January 2024, he was announced as candidate number one, on Democratic Alliance's Porto list for the 2024 legislative elections.
