= Paulo Mota Pinto =

Portuguese politician (born 1966)

Member of the Assembly of the Republic
- In office 28 March 2022 – 15 January 2024
- Constituency: Leiria
- In office 15 October 2009 – 22 October 2015
- Constituency: Coimbra (2009–2011); Lisbon (2011–2015)

Personal details
- Born: 18 November 1966 (age 59)
- Party: Social Democratic Party
- Parent: Carlos Mota Pinto (father)

Paulo Mota Pinto (born 18 November 1966) is a Portuguese politician. He was a member of the Assembly of the Republic from 2009 to 2015 and from 2022 to 2024. He is the son of Carlos Mota Pinto.
