= Rodrigo Alves Taxa =

Portuguese politician (born 1989)

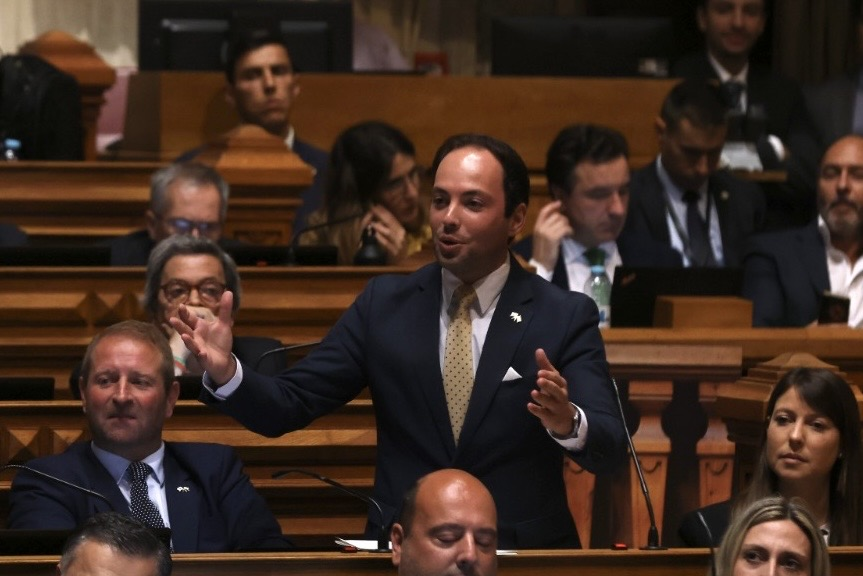

Member of the Assembly of the Republic
- Incumbent
- Assumed office 26 March 2024
- Constituency: Braga
- In office 3 November 2023 – 4 November 2023
- Preceded by: Filipe Melo
- Succeeded by: Filipe Melo
- Constituency: Braga

Personal details
- Born: 5 January 1989 (age 37)
- Party: Chega

Rodrigo Santos Alves Taxa (born 5 January 1989) is a Portuguese politician. He has been a member of the Assembly of the Republic since 2024, having previously served in 2023. From 2021 to 2023, he served as president of the jurisdictional council of Chega.
