= Joaquim Miranda Sarmento =

Portuguese politician and economist (born 1978)

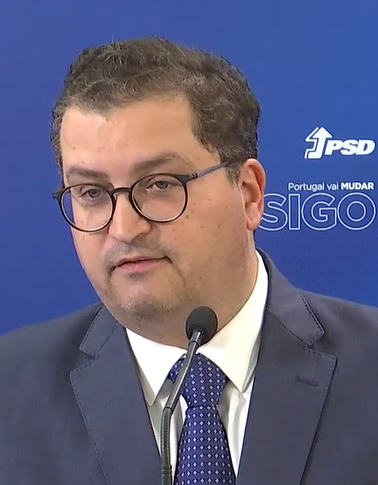
- Miranda Sarmento in 2022

Minister of State and Finance
- Incumbent
- Assumed office 2 April 2024
- Prime Minister: Luís Montenegro
- Preceded by: Fernando Medina

President of the Parliamentary Group of the Social Democratic Party
- In office 13 July 2022 – 1 April 2024
- Preceded by: Paulo Mota Pinto
- Succeeded by: Hugo Soares

Member of the Assembly of the Republic
- Incumbent
- Assumed office 29 March 2022
- Constituency: Lisbon

Personal details
- Born: Joaquim José Miranda Sarmento; 7 August 1978 (age 48) Lisbon, Portugal
- Party: Social Democratic Party
- Education: University of Lisbon
- Occupation: Economist; politician

Joaquim José Miranda Sarmento (born 7 August 1978) is a Portuguese university professor, economist and politician. He currently occupies the position of Minister of State and Finance in the XXIV and the XXV Government of Portugal, since April 2, 2024.

== Biography ==
Born in Lisbon on August 7, 1978. Joaquim Miranda Sarmento holds a PhD in Finance from Tilburg University, one of the world's leading institutions in the field. His academic career was consolidated at ISEG - Lisbon School of Economics and Management, where he is an Associate Professor with Aggregation. He has published in prestigious scientific journals and is the author of a vast body of academic work.

At the same time, he has worked in entities such as Direção-Geral do Orçamento (DGO) and Unidade Técnica de Apoio Orçamental (UTAO), as well as in the Presidency of the Republic, where he was Economic Advisor. On the political front, he was a member of the PSD's National Strategic Council, chaired the PSD Parliamentary Group and, in 2024, was appointed Minister of State and Finance in Portugal's XXIV Constitutional Government.

== Academic activity ==
Associate Professor with Aggregation at ISEG – Lisbon School of Economics and Management, University of Lisbon. Teaching activities at ISEG began in 2007 as an Invited Assistant, followed by promotion to Assistant Professor in 2014, tenure in 2019, and Aggregation in 2020. In 2023, appointment as Associate Professor with Aggregation.

PhD in Finance from Tilburg University, one of the world's most prestigious institutions in the field of Economics and Finance. According to the 2020 Shanghai Ranking, Tilburg University ranks 6th globally in Business Administration and 24th in Finance.

Doctoral research was supervised by Luc Renneboog, a leading academic in Corporate Finance.

Research focuses on Corporate Finance, Public-Private Partnerships, Taxation, as well as Public Finance and Budgetary Policy.

Recipient of the University of Lisbon Research Award in 2019, following an honourable mention in 2018.

Authored 52 papers published in journals with impact factor or Scopus indexing, along with various books, scientific articles, and book chapters published internationally. In Portugal, published 23 academic books, 2 books on economic and political thought, and over 150 scientific articles. Contributions include publications in prestigious journals such as Finance Research Letters, Journal of Multinational Financial Management, Technological Forecasting and Social Change, Journal of Business Research, Research in International Business and Finance, International Public Management Journal, Transport Policy, and Transportation.

Teaching experience in Portugal includes Católica Lisbon School of Economics, Nova SBE, ISCTE, Universidade Europeia, and ISAL. Visiting Professor at Getúlio Vargas: https://epge.fgv.br/pt/professor/joaquim-miranda-sarmento, with additional teaching engagements at various international universities. Also provided training and courses for public entities such as the Tribunal de Contas, IGF, and INA, and served as a trainer at DGCI and DGO.

Holds a Master’s in Finance from ISCTE – Instituto Superior de Ciências do Trabalho e da Empresa and a Bachelor's degree in Management from ISEG – Instituto Superior de Economia e Gestão. Completed a postgraduate program in Taxation at IDEFE/ISEG, the Advanced Program in Public-Private Partnerships at Universidade Católica, and Driving Government Performance at the Kennedy School of Government, Harvard University.

== Professional activity ==
Started professional activity in 1999, following a public recruitment process, as a trainee at the Direção Geral das Contribuições e Impostos, later becoming a Tax Technician in 2001. In 2005, joined the Direção-Geral do Orçamento through a public competition. In 2010, after another public recruitment process, was seconded to UTAO - Unidade Técnica de Apoio Orçamental – the Technical Budget Support Unit at the Portuguese Parliament. Left in 2011 to pursue a PhD.

At the end of 2012, Joaquim Miranda Sarmento was appointed Economic Adviser to the President of the Republic, Professor Aníbal Cavaco Silva, holding the position until the end of the second presidential term (March 2016).

== Political activity ==
Collaboration with the Social Democratic Party (PSD) began in 2018 within the party's National Strategic Council, with responsibility for the Public Finance portfolio. In February 2020, appointment as President of the National Strategic Council under Rui Rio’s leadership, a position held until July 2022.

In April 2022, coordination of Luís Montenegro’s strategy motion for his candidacy for the leadership of the Social Democratic Party.

In July 2022, election as President of the PSD Parliamentary Group in the XV Legislature, a role held until March 2024, when the XV Legislature ended, and the XVI Legislature began.

In 2024, designation as Minister of State and Finance in the XXIV Constitutional Government of Portugal.

== Minister of State and Finance – XXIV Government ==
Since April 2024, as Minister of State and Finance, Joaquim Miranda Sarmento led the implementation of the Government's budgetary strategy and the adoption of measures impacting public accounts management, fiscal policy, and public administration. The medium-term structural budget plan, presented under this mandate, received approval from the Council of the European Union, reflecting a balance between national priorities and European commitments.

In carrying out these responsibilities, initiatives were promoted to reduce the tax burden, enhance public administration careers, and streamline procedures. The Agenda for Fiscal Simplification introduced a set of measures to improve the relationship between taxpayers and the tax administration, reduce bureaucracy, and lower contextual costs. In terms of wages, oversight of the implementation of adjustments to the Public Administration's Base Remuneration was ensured, reinforcing salary appreciation.

- [1] https://www.iseg.ulisboa.pt/faculty/joaquim-miranda-sarmento/
- [2] https://sites.google.com/view/joaquimmirandasarmento/home
- [3] https://pure.uvt.nl/ws/files/4631591/Sarmento_PPP_thesis_final_version_for_print_21112014.pdf
- [4] https://pt.wikipedia.org/wiki/Tilburg_University
- [5] «ShanghaiRanking's Global Ranking of Academic Subjects 2020 - Business Administration». Consultado em 12 de abril de 2020
- «ShanghaiRanking's Global Ranking of Academic Subjects 2020 - Finance». Consultado em 12 de abril de 2020
- [6] https://www.tilburguniversity.edu/staff/luc-renneboog
- [7] https://scholar.google.com/citations?user=NBoCJPIAAAAJ&hl=pt-PT&oi=ao
- [8] https://sites.google.com/view/joaquimmirandasarmento/home
- [9] https://sites.google.com/view/joaquimmirandasarmento/home

Party political offices
| Preceded by Paulo Mota Pinto | Parliamentary leader of the Social Democratic Party; 2022–2024 | Succeeded by Hugo Soares |
Political offices
| Preceded by Fernando Medina | Minister of Finance; 2024–present | Incumbent |
