= Braga (Assembly of the Republic constituency) =

Constituency of the Assembly of the Republic, the national legislature of Portugal

- Constituency for the Assembly of the Republic
- Location of Braga within Portugal
- District: Braga
- Population: 867,537 (2024)
- Electorate: 782,390 (2025)
- Area: 2,706 km^{2} (2024)

Current Constituency
- Created: 1976
- Seats: List: 19 (2009–present); 18 (2002–2009); 17 (1999–2002); 16 (1991–1999); 17 (1987–1991); 16 (1983–1987); 15 (1976–1983)
- Deputies: List: Vanessa Barata (CH); Carlos Barbosa (CH); Joaquim Barbosa (PSD); Ricardo Barroso (PSD); Carlos Cação (PSD); José Luís Carneiro (PS); Irene Costa (PS); Sofia Machado Fernandes (PSD); Sónia Margarida Fernandes (PSD); Emídio Guerreiro (PSD); Sandra Lopes (PS); Hernâni Loureiro (PS); Leandro Ferreira Luís (PSD); Filipe Melo (CH); Lina Pinheiro (CH); Rui Rocha (IL); Paulo Lopes Silva (PS); Hugo Soares (PSD); Rodrigo Alves Taxa (CH)

Braga is one of the 22 multi-member constituencies of the Assembly of the Republic, the national legislature of Portugal. The constituency was established in 1976 when the Assembly of the Republic was established by the constitution following the restoration of democracy. It is conterminous with the district of Braga. The constituency currently elects 19 of the 230 members of the Assembly of the Republic using the closed party-list proportional representation electoral system. At the 2025 legislative election it had 782,390 registered electors.

Braga district constituency has always voted for the national winner of every single legislative election since 1976, being a barometer of the country's political trends.

== Electoral system ==
Braga currently elects 19 of the 230 members of the Assembly of the Republic using the closed party-list proportional representation electoral system. Seats are allocated using the D'Hondt method.

== Election results ==
=== Summary ===
Election	Unitary Democrats CDU / APU / PCP			Left Bloc BE / UDP			LIVRE L			Socialists PS / FRS			People Animals Nature PAN			Democratic Renewal PRD			Social Democrats PSD / PàF / AD / PPD			Liberals IL			CDS – People's CDS–PP / CDS			Chega CH / PPV/CDC / PPV		
Election	Votes	%	Seats	Votes	%	Seats	Votes	%	Seats	Votes	%	Seats	Votes	%	Seats	Votes	%	Seats	Votes	%	Seats	Votes	%	Seats	Votes	%	Seats	Votes	%	Seats
2025	9,182	1.73%	0	10,041	1.89%	0	16,618	3.13%	0	125,593	23.67%	5	5,183	0.98%	0				198,026	37.33%	8	36,698	6.92%	1				119,858	22.59%	5
2024	10,130	1.87%	0	21,403	3.95%	0	12,928	2.39%	0	157,123	29.01%	6	7,936	1.47%	0				184,493	34.06%	8	33,935	6.27%	1				93,859	17.33%	4
2022	13,018	2.69%	0	18,550	3.83%	0	3,936	0.81%	0	207,837	42.90%	9	5,910	1.22%	0				172,021	35.50%	8	21,437	4.42%	1	8,216	1.70%	0	28,752	5.93%	1
2019	18,460	4.17%	0	41,357	9.33%	2	3,168	0.71%	0	169,608	38.27%	8	11,949	2.70%	0				158,758	35.82%	8	3,786	0.85%	0	19,143	4.32%	1	3,192	0.72%	0
2015	24,623	5.38%	1	41,753	9.13%	1	2,336	0.51%	0	146,418	32.00%	7	3,673	0.80%	0				216,367	47.29%	10							995	0.22%	0
2011	23,731	5.08%	1	20,488	4.38%	0				159,476	34.13%	7	2,710	0.58%	0				194,550	41.63%	9				50,421	10.79%	2	783	0.17%	0
2009	23,075	4.75%	1	38,884	8.01%	1				207,518	42.73%	9							153,178	31.54%	6				48,102	9.90%	2	798	0.16%	0
2005	22,988	4.88%	1	22,179	4.71%	0				218,665	46.45%	9							158,244	33.62%	7				37,618	7.99%	1			
2002	19,808	4.43%	0	7,654	1.71%	0				169,672	37.98%	8							201,443	45.09%	9				42,074	9.42%	1			
1999	23,828	5.50%	1	5,164	1.19%	0				194,979	44.99%	8							161,616	37.29%	7				38,973	8.99%	1			
1995	20,584	4.62%	0	2,216	0.50%	0				194,375	43.66%	8							173,041	38.87%	7				48,430	10.88%	1			
1991	19,327	4.62%	0							133,607	31.92%	5				1,686	0.40%	0	227,580	54.38%	10				23,715	5.67%	1			
1987	24,648	6.25%	1	2,163	0.55%	0				104,172	26.42%	5				13,412	3.40%	0	215,380	54.62%	10				23,854	6.05%	1			
1985	33,769	8.76%	1	2,983	0.77%	0				86,285	22.39%	4				66,468	17.25%	3	130,151	33.77%	6				55,331	14.36%	2			
1983	33,336	9.06%	1	1,686	0.46%	0				149,782	40.71%	7							101,826	27.67%	5				69,051	18.77%	3			
1980	32,449	8.55%	1	3,346	0.88%	0				113,648	29.95%	5							212,676	56.04%	9									
1979	38,051	10.27%	1	5,482	1.48%	0				114,886	31.00%	5							197,250	53.23%	9									
1976	14,202	4.38%	0	3,527	1.09%	0				110,586	34.09%	6							97,886	30.17%	5				86,148	26.56%	4			

(Figures in italics represent alliances.)

=== Detailed ===
==== 2020s ====
===== 2025 =====
Results of the 2025 legislative election held on 18 May 2025:

Party		Votes	%	Seats
Democratic Alliance	AD	198,026	37.33%	8
Socialist Party	PS	125,593	23.67%	5
Chega	CH	119,858	22.59%	5
Liberal Initiative	IL	36,698	6.92%	1
LIVRE	L	16,618	3.13%	0
Left Bloc	BE	10,041	1.89%	0
Unitary Democratic Coalition	CDU	9,182	1.73%	0
National Democratic Alternative	ADN	5,333	1.01%	0
People Animals Nature	PAN	5,183	0.98%	0
React, Include, Recycle	RIR	1,280	0.24%	0
New Right	ND	889	0.17%	0
Volt Portugal	Volt	694	0.13%	0
Ergue-te	E	528	0.10%	0
Together for the People	JPP	307	0.06%	0
People's Monarchist Party	PPM	272	0.05%	0
Valid votes		530,502	100.00%	19
Blank votes		9,019	1.65%	
Rejected votes – other		5,803	1.06%	
Total polled		545,324	69.70%	
Registered electors		782,390		

The following candidates were elected:: Ricardo Araújo (AD); Vanessa Barata (CH); Carlos Barbosa (CH); Joaquim Barbosa (AD); Ricardo Barroso (AD); Carlos Cação (AD); José Luís Carneiro (PS); Irene Costa (PS); Sofia Machado Fernandes (AD); Emídio Guerreiro (AD); Sandra Lopes (PS); Filipe Melo (CH); Clara Marques Mendes (AD); Lina Pinheiro (CH); Rui Rocha (IL); Paulo Lopes Silva (PS); Hugo Soares (AD); Pedro Sousa (PS); and Rodrigo Alves Taxa (CH).

===== 2024 =====
Results of the 2024 legislative election held on 10 March 2024:

Party		Votes	%	Seats
Democratic Alliance	AD	184,493	34.06%	8
Socialist Party	PS	157,123	29.01%	6
Chega	CH	93,859	17.33%	4
Liberal Initiative	IL	33,935	6.27%	1
Left Bloc	BE	21,403	3.95%	0
LIVRE	L	12,928	2.39%	0
Unitary Democratic Coalition	CDU	10,130	1.87%	0
National Democratic Alternative	ADN	9,967	1.84%	0
People Animals Nature	PAN	7,936	1.47%	0
New Right	ND	2,616	0.48%	0
React, Include, Recycle	RIR	2,230	0.41%	0
Portuguese Workers' Communist Party	PCTP	1,899	0.35%	0
Volt Portugal	Volt	772	0.14%	0
Alternative 21 (Earth Party and Alliance)	PT-A	675	0.12%	0
Together for the People	JPP	590	0.11%	0
We, the Citizens!	NC	535	0.10%	0
Ergue-te	E	515	0.10%	0
Valid votes		541,606	100.00%	19
Blank votes		9,590	1.72%	
Rejected votes – other		5,162	0.93%	
Total polled		556,358	71.31%	
Registered electors		780,164		

The following candidates were elected: Gilberto Anjos (PS); Ricardo Araújo (AD); Vanessa Barata (CH); Carlos Barbosa (CH); Carlos Cação (AD); José Luís Carneiro (PS); Irene Costa (PS); Ricardo Costa (PS); Emídio Guerreiro (AD); Palmira Maciel (PS); Filipe Melo (CH); Clara Marques Mendes (AD); Jorge Paulo Oliveira (AD); Carlos Eduardo Reis (AD); Rui Rocha (IL); Ana Santos (AD); Hugo Soares (AD); Pedro Sousa (PS); and Rodrigo Alves Taxa (CH).

===== 2022 =====
Results of the 2022 legislative election held on 30 January 2022:

Party		Votes	%	Seats
Socialist Party	PS	207,837	42.90%	9
Social Democratic Party	PSD	172,021	35.50%	8
Chega	CH	28,752	5.93%	1
Liberal Initiative	IL	21,437	4.42%	1
Left Bloc	BE	18,550	3.83%	0
Unitary Democratic Coalition	CDU	13,018	2.69%	0
CDS – People's Party	CDS–PP	8,216	1.70%	0
People Animals Nature	PAN	5,910	1.22%	0
LIVRE	L	3,936	0.81%	0
React, Include, Recycle	RIR	1,767	0.36%	0
Socialist Alternative Movement	MAS	551	0.11%	0
Ergue-te	E	495	0.10%	0
Together for the People	JPP	481	0.10%	0
Portuguese Labour Party	PTP	460	0.09%	0
Earth Party	PT	451	0.09%	0
Volt Portugal	Volt	357	0.07%	0
Alliance	A	286	0.06%	0
Valid votes		484,525	100.00%	19
Blank votes		6,158	1.25%	
Rejected votes – other		3,846	0.78%	
Total polled		494,529	63.68%	
Registered electors		776,543		

The following candidates were elected: Joaquim Barreto (PS); Carlos Cação (PSD); Bruno Coimbra (PSD); José Luís Carneiro (PS); Gabriela Fonseca (PSD); André Coelho Lima (PSD); Palmira Maciel (PS); Firmino Marques (PSD); Pompeu Martins (PS); Elisabete Matos (PS); Filipe Melo (CH); Clara Marques Mendes (PSD); Eduardo Oliveira (PS); Jorge Paulo Oliveira (PSD); Hugo Pires (PS); Anabela Real (PS); Carlos Eduardo Reis (PSD); Rui Rocha (IL); and Luís Soares (PS).

==== 2010s ====
===== 2019 =====
Results of the 2019 legislative election held on 6 October 2019:

Party		Votes	%	Seats
Socialist Party	PS	169,608	38.27%	8
Social Democratic Party	PSD	158,758	35.82%	8
Left Bloc	BE	41,357	9.33%	2
CDS – People's Party	CDS–PP	19,143	4.32%	1
Unitary Democratic Coalition	CDU	18,460	4.17%	0
People Animals Nature	PAN	11,949	2.70%	0
Liberal Initiative	IL	3,786	0.85%	0
React, Include, Recycle	RIR	3,336	0.75%	0
Chega	CH	3,192	0.72%	0
LIVRE	L	3,168	0.71%	0
Portuguese Workers' Communist Party	PCTP	2,333	0.53%	0
Alliance	A	2,188	0.49%	0
We, the Citizens!	NC	1,018	0.23%	0
Earth Party	PT	1,000	0.23%	0
National Renewal Party	PNR	857	0.19%	0
Democratic Republican Party	PDR	605	0.14%	0
United Party of Retirees and Pensioners	PURP	550	0.12%	0
Portuguese Labour Party	PTP	523	0.12%	0
Socialist Alternative Movement	MAS	508	0.11%	0
People's Monarchist Party	PPM	422	0.10%	0
Together for the People	JPP	413	0.09%	0
Valid votes		443,174	100.00%	19
Blank votes		14,540	3.12%	
Rejected votes – other		7,960	1.71%	
Total polled		465,674	59.84%	
Registered electors		778,174		

The following candidates were elected: Joaquim Barreto (PS); Maria Begonha (PS); José Maria Cardoso (BE); Telmo Correia (CDS-PP); Sónia Fertuzinhos (PS); Gabriela Fonseca (PSD); Emídio Guerreiro (PSD); André Coelho Lima (PSD); Palmira Maciel (PS); Firmino Marques (PSD); Clara Marques Mendes (PSD); José Mendes (PS); Jorge Paulo Oliveira (PSD); Hugo Pires (PS); Carlos Eduardo Reis (PSD); Nuno Sá (PS); Rui Silva (PSD); Luís Soares (PS); and Alexandra Vieira (BE).

===== 2015 =====
Results of the 2015 legislative election held on 4 October 2015:

Party		Votes	%	Seats
Portugal Ahead	PàF	216,367	47.29%	10
Socialist Party	PS	146,418	32.00%	7
Left Bloc	BE	41,753	9.13%	1
Unitary Democratic Coalition	CDU	24,623	5.38%	1
Democratic Republican Party	PDR	7,509	1.64%	0
Portuguese Workers' Communist Party	PCTP	5,442	1.19%	0
People Animals Nature	PAN	3,673	0.80%	0
LIVRE	L	2,336	0.51%	0
National Renewal Party	PNR	1,834	0.40%	0
ACT! (Portuguese Labour Party and Socialist Alternative Movement)	AGIR	1,621	0.35%	0
The Earth Party Movement	MPT	1,609	0.35%	0
Citizenship and Christian Democracy	PPV/CDC	995	0.22%	0
We, the Citizens!	NC	974	0.21%	0
People's Monarchist Party	PPM	883	0.19%	0
United Party of Retirees and Pensioners	PURP	882	0.19%	0
Together for the People	JPP	631	0.14%	0
Valid votes		457,550	100.00%	19
Blank votes		10,746	2.27%	
Rejected votes – other		6,063	1.28%	
Total polled		474,359	60.20%	
Registered electors		787,983		

The following candidates were elected: Joaquim Barreto (PS); Manuel Caldeira Cabral (PS); Telmo Correia (PàF); Carla Cruz (CDU); Sónia Fertuzinhos (PS); Emídio Guerreiro (PàF); Laura Monteiro Magalhães (PàF); Clara Marques Mendes (PàF); Fernando Negrão (PàF); Jorge Paulo Oliveira (PàF); Domingos Pereira (PS); Hugo Pires (PS); Joel Sá (PàF); Maria Augusta Santos (PS); Vânia Dias da Silva (PàF); Jorge Moreira da Silva (PàF); Hugo Soares (PàF); Luís Soares (PS); and Pedro Soares (BE).

===== 2011 =====
Results of the 2011 legislative election held on 5 June 2011:

Party		Votes	%	Seats
Social Democratic Party	PSD	194,550	41.63%	9
Socialist Party	PS	159,476	34.13%	7
CDS – People's Party	CDS–PP	50,421	10.79%	2
Unitary Democratic Coalition	CDU	23,731	5.08%	1
Left Bloc	BE	20,488	4.38%	0
Portuguese Workers' Communist Party	PCTP	4,264	0.91%	0
Party for Animals and Nature	PAN	2,710	0.58%	0
New Democracy Party	ND	2,328	0.50%	0
The Earth Party Movement	MPT	1,959	0.42%	0
Hope for Portugal Movement	MEP	1,630	0.35%	0
Portuguese Labour Party	PTP	1,465	0.31%	0
People's Monarchist Party	PPM	1,114	0.24%	0
National Renewal Party	PNR	1,094	0.23%	0
Pro-Life Party	PPV	783	0.17%	0
Workers' Party of Socialist Unity	POUS	693	0.15%	0
Democratic Party of the Atlantic	PDA	593	0.13%	0
Valid votes		467,299	100.00%	19
Blank votes		12,846	2.65%	
Rejected votes – other		5,243	1.08%	
Total polled		485,388	62.64%	
Registered electors		774,861		

The following candidates were elected: Francisca Almeida (PSD); Altino Bessa (CDS-PP); António Braga (PS); Gabriela Canavilhas (PS); Telmo Correia (CDS-PP); Laurentino Dias (PS); Sónia Fertuzinhos (PS); Emídio Guerreiro (PSD); Miguel Laranjeiro (PS); João Lobo (PSD); Agostinho Lopes (CDU); Miguel Macedo (PSD); Clara Marques Mendes (PSD); Graça Mota (PSD); Fernando Negrão (PSD); Jorge Paulo Oliveira (PSD); Nuno Reis (PSD); Nuno Sá (PS); and António José Seguro (PS).

==== 2000s ====
===== 2009 =====
Results of the 2009 legislative election held on 27 September 2009:

Party		Votes	%	Seats
Socialist Party	PS	207,518	42.73%	9
Social Democratic Party	PSD	153,178	31.54%	6
CDS – People's Party	CDS–PP	48,102	9.90%	2
Left Bloc	BE	38,884	8.01%	1
Unitary Democratic Coalition	CDU	23,075	4.75%	1
Portuguese Workers' Communist Party	PCTP	3,825	0.79%	0
New Democracy Party	ND	3,819	0.79%	0
Hope for Portugal Movement	MEP	1,531	0.32%	0
People's Monarchist Party	PPM	1,518	0.31%	0
The Earth Party Movement and Humanist Party	MPT-PH	1,204	0.25%	0
Merit and Society Movement	MMS	955	0.20%	0
National Renewal Party	PNR	841	0.17%	0
Pro-Life Party	PPV	798	0.16%	0
Workers' Party of Socialist Unity	POUS	395	0.08%	0
Valid votes		485,643	100.00%	19
Blank votes		6,878	1.38%	
Rejected votes – other		4,820	0.97%	
Total polled		497,341	65.31%	
Registered electors		761,453		

The following candidates were elected: Francisca Almeida (PSD); Altino Bessa (CDS-PP); António Braga (PS); Telmo Correia (CDS-PP); Isabel Coutinho (PS); Laurentino Dias (PS); Teresa Fernandes (PSD); Sónia Fertuzinhos (PS); Ricardo Gonçalves (PS); Emídio Guerreiro (PSD); Miguel Laranjeiro (PS); Agostinho Lopes (CDU); Miguel Macedo (PSD); Fernando Moniz (PS); João de Deus Pinheiro (PSD); Nuno Reis (PSD); António José Seguro (PS); Pedro Soares (BE); and Teresa Venda (PS).

===== 2005 =====
Results of the 2005 legislative election held on 20 February 2005:

Party		Votes	%	Seats
Socialist Party	PS	218,665	46.45%	9
Social Democratic Party	PSD	158,244	33.62%	7
CDS – People's Party	CDS–PP	37,618	7.99%	1
Unitary Democratic Coalition	CDU	22,988	4.88%	1
Left Bloc	BE	22,179	4.71%	0
New Democracy Party	ND	4,422	0.94%	0
Portuguese Workers' Communist Party	PCTP	3,688	0.78%	0
Humanist Party	PH	1,317	0.28%	0
Workers' Party of Socialist Unity	POUS	865	0.18%	0
National Renewal Party	PNR	720	0.15%	0
Valid votes		470,706	100.00%	18
Blank votes		6,631	1.38%	
Rejected votes – other		3,921	0.81%	
Total polled		481,258	69.76%	
Registered electors		689,897		

The following candidates were elected: Patinha Antão (PSD); António Braga (PS); Virgílio Almeida Costa (PSD); Isabel Coutinho (PS); Laurentino Dias (PS); Emídio Guerreiro (PSD); Isabel Jorge (PS); Miguel Laranjeiro (PS); Agostinho Lopes (CDU); Miguel Macedo (PSD); Nuno Melo (CDS-PP); Luís Filipe Menezes (PSD); Fernando Moniz (PS); Fernando Santos Pereira (PSD); Jorge Pereira (PSD); António José Seguro (PS); Vieira da Silva (PS); and Teresa Venda (PS).

===== 2002 =====
Results of the 2002 legislative election held on 17 March 2002:

Party		Votes	%	Seats
Social Democratic Party	PSD	201,443	45.09%	9
Socialist Party	PS	169,672	37.98%	8
CDS – People's Party	CDS–PP	42,074	9.42%	1
Unitary Democratic Coalition	CDU	19,808	4.43%	0
Left Bloc	BE	7,654	1.71%	0
Portuguese Workers' Communist Party	PCTP	2,378	0.53%	0
People's Monarchist Party	PPM	1,257	0.28%	0
Humanist Party	PH	934	0.21%	0
The Earth Party Movement	MPT	819	0.18%	0
Workers' Party of Socialist Unity	POUS	722	0.16%	0
Valid votes		446,761	100.00%	18
Blank votes		3,160	0.70%	
Rejected votes – other		3,376	0.74%	
Total polled		453,297	67.30%	
Registered electors		673,510		

The following candidates were elected: António Braga (PS); Luís Cirilo (PSD); Virgílio Almeida Costa (PSD); Laurentino Dias (PS); Elisa Ferreira (PS); Sónia Fertuzinhos (PS); Ricardo Gonçalves (PS); Goreti Machado (PSD); Eugénio Marinho (PSD); Nuno Melo (CDS-PP); Fernando Moniz (PS); Tavares Moreira (PSD); Fernando Santos Pereira (PSD); Jorge Pereira (PSD); Rui Miguel Ribeiro (PSD); Vieira da Silva (PS); António Pinheiro Torres (PSD); and Teresa Venda (PS).

==== 1990s ====
===== 1999 =====
Results of the 1999 legislative election held on 10 October 1999:

Party		Votes	%	Seats
Socialist Party	PS	194,979	44.99%	8
Social Democratic Party	PSD	161,616	37.29%	7
CDS – People's Party	CDS–PP	38,973	8.99%	1
Unitary Democratic Coalition	CDU	23,828	5.50%	1
Left Bloc	BE	5,164	1.19%	0
Portuguese Workers' Communist Party	PCTP	2,963	0.68%	0
National Solidarity Party	PSN	1,750	0.40%	0
People's Monarchist Party	PPM	1,436	0.33%	0
The Earth Party Movement	MPT	969	0.22%	0
Humanist Party	PH	863	0.20%	0
Workers' Party of Socialist Unity	POUS	827	0.19%	0
Valid votes		433,368	100.00%	17
Blank votes		3,107	0.71%	
Rejected votes – other		3,417	0.78%	
Total polled		439,892	67.49%	
Registered electors		651,832		

The following candidates were elected: Maria Eduarda Azevedo (PSD); António Braga (PS); Maria do Rosário Carneiro (PS); José Ribeiro e Castro (CDS-PP); Vieira de Castro (PSD); Luís Cirilo (PSD); Virgílio Almeida Costa (PSD); Laurentino Dias (PS); José Manuel Fernandes (PSD); Sónia Fertuzinhos (PS); Agostinho Lopes (CDU); João Lourenço (PS); Miguel Macedo (PSD); Mesquita Machado (PS); Fernando Moniz (PS); Fernando Santos Pereira (PSD); and António Reis (PS).

===== 1995 =====
Results of the 1995 legislative election held on 1 October 1995:

Party		Votes	%	Seats
Socialist Party	PS	194,375	43.66%	8
Social Democratic Party	PSD	173,041	38.87%	7
CDS – People's Party	CDS–PP	48,430	10.88%	1
Unitary Democratic Coalition	CDU	20,584	4.62%	0
Popular Democratic Union	UDP	2,216	0.50%	0
Portuguese Workers' Communist Party	PCTP	2,118	0.48%	0
Revolutionary Socialist Party	PSR	1,776	0.40%	0
National Solidarity Party	PSN	1,525	0.34%	0
People's Party	PG	1,141	0.26%	0
Valid votes		445,206	100.00%	16
Blank votes		2,340	0.52%	
Rejected votes – other		5,435	1.20%	
Total polled		452,981	70.72%	
Registered electors		640,514		

The following candidates were elected: Filomena Bordalo (PSD); António Braga (PS); Maria do Rosário Carneiro (PS); Alberto Arons de Carvalho (PS); Laurentino Dias (PS); Joel Ferro (PS); Alberto Queiroga Figueiredo (PSD); Martinho Gonçalves (PS); Artur Sousa Lopes (PS); Miguel Macedo (PSD); José Alberto Cardoso Marques (PS); Eurico de Melo (PSD); Luís Marques Mendes (PSD); Manuel Fernandes da Silva Monteiro (CDS-PP); Amândio Oliveira (PSD); and Fernando Santos Pereira (PSD).

===== 1991 =====
Results of the 1991 legislative election held on 6 October 1991:

Party		Votes	%	Seats
Social Democratic Party	PSD	227,580	54.38%	10
Socialist Party	PS	133,607	31.92%	5
Social Democratic Centre Party	CDS	23,715	5.67%	1
Unitary Democratic Coalition	CDU	19,327	4.62%	0
Revolutionary Socialist Party	PSR	3,441	0.82%	0
Portuguese Workers' Communist Party	PCTP	3,291	0.79%	0
National Solidarity Party	PSN	3,241	0.77%	0
Democratic Renewal Party	PRD	1,686	0.40%	0
People's Monarchist Party	PPM	1,329	0.32%	0
Democratic Party of the Atlantic	PDA	1,311	0.31%	0
Valid votes		418,528	100.00%	16
Blank votes		2,252	0.53%	
Rejected votes – other		4,084	0.96%	
Total polled		424,864	79.65%	
Registered electors		533,427		

The following candidates were elected: António Braga (PS); Nogueira de Brito (CDS); Virgílio Carneiro (PSD); Alberto Arons de Carvalho (PS); Lemos Damião (PSD); Laurentino Dias (PS); Miguel Macedo (PSD); Alberto Martins (PS); Fernando Ribeiro Martins (PS); João Oliveira Martins (PSD); Eurico de Melo (PSD); António Marques Mendes (PSD); Isabel Mota (PSD); Amândio Oliveira (PSD); Carlos Pereira (PSD); and Fernando Ribeiro dos Reis (PSD).

==== 1980s ====
===== 1987 =====
Results of the 1987 legislative election held on 19 July 1987:

Party		Votes	%	Seats
Social Democratic Party	PSD	215,380	54.62%	10
Socialist Party	PS	104,172	26.42%	5
Unitary Democratic Coalition	CDU	24,648	6.25%	1
Social Democratic Centre Party	CDS	23,854	6.05%	1
Democratic Renewal Party	PRD	13,412	3.40%	0
Popular Democratic Union	UDP	2,163	0.55%	0
Christian Democratic Party	PDC	2,051	0.52%	0
Revolutionary Socialist Party	PSR	1,977	0.50%	0
People's Monarchist Party	PPM	1,707	0.43%	0
Communist Party (Reconstructed)	PC(R)	1,369	0.35%	0
Portuguese Workers' Communist Party	PCTP	1,360	0.34%	0
Portuguese Democratic Movement	MDP	1,171	0.30%	0
Workers' Party of Socialist Unity	POUS	1,060	0.27%	0
Valid votes		394,324	100.00%	17
Blank votes		3,176	0.79%	
Rejected votes – other		5,563	1.38%	
Total polled		403,063	77.24%	
Registered electors		521,819		

The following candidates were elected: António Barbosa de Azevedo (PSD); Nogueira de Brito (CDS); Virgílio Carneiro (PSD); Alberto Arons de Carvalho (PS); Fernando Conceição (PSD); Elisa Maria Damião (PS); António Lopes (CDU); Miguel Macedo (PSD); Mesquita Machado (PS); António Magalhães (PS); Eurico de Melo (PSD); António Marques Mendes (PSD); Luís Marques Mendes (PSD); Fernando Moniz (PS); Amândio Oliveira (PSD); Cerqueira de Oliveira (PSD); and António Ribeiro (PSD).

===== 1985 =====
Results of the 1985 legislative election held on 6 October 1985:

Party		Votes	%	Seats
Social Democratic Party	PSD	130,151	33.77%	6
Socialist Party	PS	86,285	22.39%	4
Democratic Renewal Party	PRD	66,468	17.25%	3
Social Democratic Centre Party	CDS	55,331	14.36%	2
United People Alliance	APU	33,769	8.76%	1
Christian Democratic Party	PDC	3,583	0.93%	0
Popular Democratic Union	UDP	2,983	0.77%	0
Revolutionary Socialist Party	PSR	2,723	0.71%	0
Portuguese Workers' Communist Party	PCTP	1,701	0.44%	0
Communist Party (Reconstructed)	PC(R)	1,400	0.36%	0
Workers' Party of Socialist Unity	POUS	1,009	0.26%	0
Valid votes		385,403	100.00%	16
Blank votes		3,082	0.78%	
Rejected votes – other		8,199	2.07%	
Total polled		396,684	77.59%	
Registered electors		511,237		

The following candidates were elected: António Barbosa de Azevedo (PSD); Nogueira de Brito (CDS); Virgílio Carneiro (PSD); Fernando Conceição (PSD); Agostinho Domingues (PS); Joaquim Carneiro de Barros Domingues (PSD); António Fernandes (PRD); António Lopes (APU); António Magalhães (PS); Eurico de Melo (PSD); António Marques Mendes (PSD); Eurico Pires (PRD); Raul Rêgo (PS); Sérgio Machado dos Santos (PRD); Cruz Vilaça (CDS); and António Vitorino (PS).

===== 1983 =====
Results of the 1983 legislative election held on 25 April 1983:

Party		Votes	%	Seats
Socialist Party	PS	149,782	40.71%	7
Social Democratic Party	PSD	101,826	27.67%	5
Social Democratic Centre Party	CDS	69,051	18.77%	3
United People Alliance	APU	33,336	9.06%	1
Christian Democratic Party	PDC	3,812	1.04%	0
People's Monarchist Party	PPM	3,432	0.93%	0
Popular Democratic Union	UDP	1,686	0.46%	0
Workers' Party of Socialist Unity	POUS	1,417	0.39%	0
Revolutionary Socialist Party	PSR	1,415	0.38%	0
Portuguese Workers' Communist Party	PCTP	938	0.25%	0
Socialist Workers League	LST	779	0.21%	0
Portuguese Marxist–Leninist Communist Organization	OCMLP	482	0.13%	0
Valid votes		367,956	100.00%	16
Blank votes		2,444	0.65%	
Rejected votes – other		7,302	1.93%	
Total polled		377,702	81.69%	
Registered electors		462,356		

The following candidates were elected: António Barbosa de Azevedo (PSD); Domingues Azevedo (PS); Nogueira de Brito (CDS); Lemos Damião (PSD); Agostinho Domingues (PS); Basílio Horta (CDS); António Lopes (APU); Mesquita Machado (PS); António Marques Mendes (PSD); Amândio Oliveira (PSD); Armando Oliveira (CDS); Frederico Augusto Oliveira (PS); Jorge Guimarães Quinta (PS); Raul Rêgo (PS); João Maurício Fernandes Salgueiro (PSD); and Gaspar Teixeira (PS).

===== 1980 =====
Results of the 1980 legislative election held on 5 October 1980:

Party		Votes	%	Seats
Democratic Alliance	AD	212,676	56.04%	9
Republican and Socialist Front	FRS	113,648	29.95%	5
United People Alliance	APU	32,449	8.55%	1
Workers' Party of Socialist Unity	POUS	7,212	1.90%	0
Revolutionary Socialist Party	PSR	4,360	1.15%	0
Popular Democratic Union	UDP	3,346	0.88%	0
Portuguese Workers' Communist Party	PCTP	1,977	0.52%	0
Labour Party	PT	1,912	0.50%	0
Christian Democratic Party, Independent Movement for the National Reconstruction / Party of the Portuguese Right and National Front	PDC- MIRN/ PDP-FN	964	0.25%	0
Portuguese Marxist–Leninist Communist Organization	OCMLP	935	0.25%	0
Valid votes		379,479	100.00%	15
Blank votes		1,731	0.45%	
Rejected votes – other		6,366	1.64%	
Total polled		387,576	89.31%	
Registered electors		433,979		

The following candidates were elected: Lemos Damião (AD); Basílio Horta (AD); Carlos Macedo (AD); Mesquita Machado (FRS); Jorge Miranda (FRS); Henrique de Moraes (AD); Armando Oliveira (AD); Carlos Pereira Pinho (AD); Raul Rêgo (FRS); Fernando Roriz (AD); Henrique Barrilaro Ruas (AD); Joaquim Baptista Sá (APU); Parcidio Soares (FRS); Cruz Vilaça (AD); and Salgado Zenha (FRS).

==== 1970s ====
===== 1979 =====
Results of the 1979 legislative election held on 2 December 1979:

Party		Votes	%	Seats
Democratic Alliance	AD	197,250	53.23%	9
Socialist Party	PS	114,886	31.00%	5
United People Alliance	APU	38,051	10.27%	1
Christian Democratic Party	PDC	5,867	1.58%	0
Popular Democratic Union	UDP	5,482	1.48%	0
Portuguese Workers' Communist Party	PCTP	3,856	1.04%	0
Left-wing Union for the Socialist Democracy	UEDS	2,955	0.80%	0
Revolutionary Socialist Party	PSR	2,235	0.60%	0
Valid votes		370,582	100.00%	15
Blank votes		1,995	0.52%	
Rejected votes – other		7,830	2.06%	
Total polled		380,407	91.30%	
Registered electors		416,650		

The following candidates were elected: João Pulido de Almeida (AD); Armando Correia (AD); Agostinho Domingues (PS); Basílio Horta (AD); Carlos Macedo (AD); Baptista Machado (AD); Mesquita Machado (PS); Henrique de Moraes (AD); Frederico Augusto Oliveira (PS); Domingos da Silva Pereira (AD); Carlos Pereira Pinho (AD); Raul Rêgo (PS); Fernando Roriz (AD); Joaquim Baptista Sá (APU); and Salgado Zenha (PS).

===== 1976 =====
Results of the 1976 legislative election held on 25 April 1976:

Party		Votes	%	Seats
Socialist Party	PS	110,586	34.09%	6
Democratic People's Party	PPD	97,886	30.17%	5
Social Democratic Centre Party	CDS	86,148	26.56%	4
Portuguese Communist Party	PCP	14,202	4.38%	0
Popular Democratic Union	UDP	3,527	1.09%	0
People's Socialist Front	FSP	2,945	0.91%	0
People's Monarchist Party	PPM	2,658	0.82%	0
Christian Democratic Party	PDC	1,722	0.53%	0
Re-Organized Movement of the Party of the Proletariat	MRPP	1,589	0.49%	0
Movement of Socialist Left	MES	998	0.31%	0
Communist Party of Portugal (Marxist–Leninist)	PCP(ML)	930	0.29%	0
Internationalist Communist League	LCI	651	0.20%	0
Worker–Peasant Alliance	AOC	569	0.18%	0
Valid votes		324,411	100.00%	15
Rejected votes		18,133	5.29%	
Total polled		342,544	89.57%	
Registered electors		382,434		

The following candidates were elected: João Pulido de Almeida (CDS); Armando Bacelar (PS); Francisco Barroso (PPD); Vasco Valentim Baptista de Carvalho (PPD); José Ribeiro e Castro (CDS); Jorge Coutinho (PS); Basílio Horta (CDS); Mesquita Machado (PS); António Marques Mendes (PPD); Jorge Miranda (PPD); Henrique de Moraes (CDS); Jerónimo da Silva Pereira (PS); Raul Rêgo (PS); Joaquim Oliveira Rodrigues (PS); and Fernando Roriz (PPD).
