= Francisco Gomes (politician) =

Portuguese politician

Member of the Assembly of the Republic
- Incumbent
- Assumed office 26 March 2024
- Constituency: Madeira
- In office June 2014 – 23 October 2015
- Constituency: Madeira

Member of the Legislative Assembly of Madeira
- In office January 2014 – June 2014

Member of the Funchal Municipal Assembly
- In office 11 October 2009 – 1 October 2017

Personal details
- Born: Francisco Manuel Freitas Gomes; 18 April 1980 (age 46) Funchal, Madeira, Portugal
- Party: Chega (2023–present)
- Other political affiliations: Social Democratic Party (until 2022)
- Spouse: Maria do Carmo Gomes
- Education: Harvard University; University of Cádiz; University of Oxford
- Occupation: Political scientist • Politician

Francisco Manuel Freitas Gomes (born 18 April 1980) is a Portuguese political scientist and politician. He was a member of the Assembly of the Republic between 2014 and 2015 for the Social Democratic Party. He has a degree in Political science.

In 2009, he was elected to the Funchal Municipal Assembly, and, in January 2014, as a PSD member to the Legislative Assembly of Madeira. Between June 2014 and October 2015 he was a member of the Assembly of the Republic.

In January 2024, he was announced as candidate number one, on Chega's list for the Madeira constituency for the 2024 legislative elections.
