= Irene Costa =

Portuguese politician and social worker (born 1972)

Irene Manuela Ferreira da Costa

Member of the Assembly of the Republic
- Incumbent
- Assumed office 2022
- Constituency: Braga

Member of the Vizela Municipal Assembly
- Incumbent
- Assumed office 2017

Personal details
- Born: 8 March 1972 (age 54) Vizela, Braga District, Portugal
- Party: Portuguese: Socialist Party (PS)
- Spouse: Jose Carlos Pinto da Costa
- Occupation: Social worker and politician

Irene Manuela Ferreira da Costa (born 1972) is a Portuguese social worker and politician. As a member of the Portuguese Socialist Party (PS), she was elected as a deputy in the Portuguese Assembly of the Republic in January 2022, representing Braga, and was re-elected in 2024.

== Career ==
Costa was born on 8 March 1972. She comes from Vizela in the north of Portugal and is married to Jose Carlos Pinto da Costa. She has a degree in social work and from 2004 to 2022 worked for the northern regional health service of Portugal. In 2020 she was elected unanimously as president of the Lions Club of Vizela.

== Political career ==
In 2017 Costa became a deputy in the Vizela municipal assembly, initially as a supporter of the Vizela Sempre (Always Vizela) movement. In her second term in this role she was elected as a member of the Socialist Party (PS). In the 2022 national election when the PS, under the prime minister António Costa, won an overall majority, she was eleventh on the PS list of candidates for the Braga constituency. The PS won nine seats in the constituency but she joined the national assembly when the head of the list, José Luís Carneiro, was appointed as Minister of Internal Administration and another successful candidate, Elisabete Matos, requested a delay in taking up her duties to enable her to complete her contract as artistic director of the Teatro Nacional de São Carlos in Lisbon. In the 2024 election Costa was fifth on the PS list and was elected when the PS won six of the 19 seats in the constituency.
