= Ângela Almeida =

Portuguese politician

Ângela Maria Bento Rodrigues Nunes Saraiva de Almeida
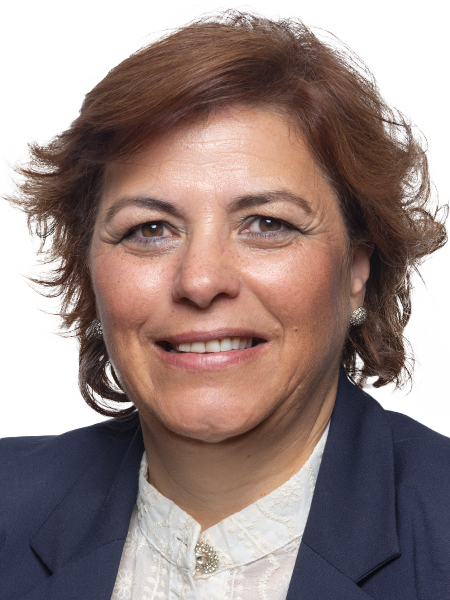

Member of the Assembly of the Republic
- Incumbent
- Assumed office 24 March 2024
- Constituency: Aveiro

Personal details
- Born: 10 August 1971 (age 54) Portugal
- Party: Social Democratic Party (PSD)
- Occupation: Language teacher

Ângela Maria Bento Rodrigues Nunes Saraiva de Almeida (born 1971) is a Portuguese politician. As a member of the Social Democratic Party (PSD), she was elected as a deputy to the 16th legislature of the Assembly of the Republic of Portugal in 2024.

== Early life and education ==
Almeida was born on 10 August 1971. She has worked as a teacher. At the time of her election, she was member of the board of directors of the National Association of Parishes (ANAFRE) and was mayor of Esgueira, a parish in the Aveiro Municipality.

== Political career ==
As a member of the PSD, Almeida became a member of the Esgueira parish council in 2009 and the mayor in 2013. She was re-elected as mayor in 2017 and in 2021. In the 2024 national election, following the resignation of the Socialist prime minister António Costa, the PSD formed an alliance for the election with two smaller parties, known as the Democratic Alliance (AD). Almeida was chosen to be third on the AD list of candidates for the Aveiro constituency. The AD won seven of the 16 seats available, and she was duly elected to the Assembly.

Within the Assembly she was appointed to be a member of the Education and Science Committee. Her first two interventions on the floor of the Assembly were to argue for the gradual reduction of road tolls and to recommend that the Government evaluate the reimbursement of the costs of a specific food supplement for people with Crohn's disease.
