= João Tilly =

Portuguese youtuber and politician

Member of the Assembly of the Republic
- Incumbent
- Assumed office 26 March 2024
- Constituency: Viseu

Personal details
- Born: João José Rodrigues Tilly; 30 May 1960 (age 66) Coimbra, Portugal
- Party: Chega (2019–present)
- Other political affiliations: Socialist Party (formerly); Social Democratic Party (2005–2019)
- Occupation: Politician • YouTuber • teacher

João José Rodrigues Tilly (born 30 May 1960) is a Portuguese politician, math teacher, and YouTuber who was elected as a member of the Assembly of the Republic following the 2024 legislative election.

== Biography ==
Tilly was born in 1960. He studied mechanical engineering and is currently a math teacher. He lives in Seia, in the Guarda District, since 1989.

He gained popularity through his YouTube videos commenting on current politics. In his videos, João Tilly has spread hesitancy about COVID-19 vaccines and has strongly criticized Ukrainian president Volodymyr Zelenskyy after the start of the 2022 Russian invasion of Ukraine.
