= Vanessa Barata =

Portuguese politician (born 1988)

Member of the Assembly of the Republic
- Incumbent
- Assumed office 26 March 2024
- Constituency: Braga

Personal details
- Born: 27 May 1988 (age 38) Fafe, Portugal
- Party: Chega
- Education: University of Minho
- Occupation: Lawyer • Politician

Vanessa Cláudia Nogueira da Rosa Barata (born 27 May 1988) is a Portuguese politician and lawyer. In the 2024 Portuguese national election she was elected to the Assembly of the Republic as a representative of the right-wing CHEGA party.

== Early life and education ==
Vanessa Barata was born on 27 May 1988 in Fafe in the Braga District of northern Portugal. She was educated at the local high school and was a junior handball player with the A.C. Fafe team. She then went to the University of Minho, where she studied law between 2006 and 2012. She then obtained a master's degree in business management and marketing from the Instituto de Estudos Superiores (Higher Studies Institute) of Fafe. Since 2014 she has worked as a lawyer with various companies and has published on the topic of due diligence.

== Political career ==
In the 2024 national election, Barata was chosen as the third candidate on the CHEGA list for the Braga constituency. The party won four of the 19 seats available in the constituency and she was duly elected. In the parliament she was appointed to the Committee on Constitutional Affairs, Rights, Freedoms and Guarantees and the Committee on Labour, Social Security and Inclusion. Following the announcement of the 2025 national election, as a result of the collapse of the government, she was again third on the list of CHEGA candidates for the Braga constituency. She was re-elected when the party won five seats in Braga.
