= Gonçalo Valente =

Portuguese politician (born 1980)

Member of the Assembly of the Republic
- Incumbent
- Assumed office 26 March 2024
- Constituency: Beja

Personal details
- Born: 19 June 1980 (age 45)
- Party: Social Democratic Party

Gonçalo Nuno Raio Valente e Henrique (born 19 June 1980) is a Portuguese politician serving as a member of the Assembly of the Republic since 2024. From 2019 to 2024, he served as president of the Social Democratic Party in the Beja District.
