= Emídio Guerreiro (politician) =

Portuguese politician (born 1965)

Member of the Assembly of the Republic
- Incumbent
- Assumed office 25 March 2024
- Constituency: Braga
- In office 10 March 2005 – 28 March 2022
- Constituency: Braga

Personal details
- Born: Emídio Guerreiro; 23 May 1965 (age 60)
- Party: Social Democratic Party
- Occupation: Politician
- Profession: Psychologist

Emídio Guerreiro (born 23 May 1965) is a Portuguese psychologist and politician, who is a member of the Assembly of the Republic, first elected in 2005. He was the secretary of state for sports and youth between 2013 and 2015.

He ran for Mayor of Gondomar in the 2025 local elections, being defeated.
