= Clara Marques Mendes =

Portuguese politician

Secretary of State for Social Action and Inclusion
- Incumbent
- Assumed office 5 April 2024
- Prime Minister: Luís Montenegro
- Minister: Maria do Rosário Palma Ramalho

Member of the Assembly of the Republic
- In office 20 June 2011 – 5 April 2024
- Constituency: Braga

Personal details
- Born: Maria Clara Gonçalves Marques Mendes; 30 April 1970 (age 56) Fafe, Portugal
- Party: Social Democratic Party
- Spouse: Sérgio Lobo Ribeiro (m. 2016)
- Children: 1
- Parent: António Marques Mendes (father)
- Relatives: Luís Marques Mendes (brother)
- Occupation: Lawyer • politician

Maria Clara Gonçalves Marques Mendes (born 30 April 1970) is a Portuguese lawyer and politician. She represents the Social Democratic Party (PSD) in the Assembly of the Republic of Portugal.

== Family ==
Maria Clara Gonçalves Marques Mendes was born on 30 April 1970. She is the daughter of Maria Isabel Gonçalves and her husband, António Marques Mendes, who was a lawyer and co-founder of the Social Democratic Party. Her brother is a former leader of the PSD, Luís Marques Mendes. She married Sérgio Lobo Ribeiro in 2016.

== Political career ==
Clara Marques Mendes obtained a degree in law and then practised law at her father's law office in Fafe, a town in the northern Portuguese district of Braga. Invited to be part of the PSD list for Braga in the 2011 national elections, she was elected to the Assembly of the Republic. She was re-elected in the 2015, 2019, 2022, 2024 and 2025 elections. Since the 2024 election she has also been Secretary of State for Social Action and Inclusion. From 2013 to 2020 she was also a deputy in the municipal assembly of Fafe.

Mendes has been a member of the Parliamentary Committee on Work and Social Security, an alternate on the Committee on European Matters and, more recently, an alternate on the committee that investigates ways of achieving economic and social recovery from COVID-19.
