= Eva Brás Pinho =

Portuguese politician

Member of the Assembly of the Republic
- Incumbent
- Assumed office 26 March 2024
- Constituency: Lisbon District

Member of the Cascais municipal assembly
- Incumbent
- Assumed office 2021

Personal details
- Born: Eva Luna Brás Pinho; 4 December 1999 (age 26)
- Party: Social Democratic Party
- Education: Catholic University of Portugal
- Occupation: Lawyer • politician

Eva Luna Brás Pinho (born 1999) is a Portuguese politician. She is a deputy in the 16th legislature of the Assembly of the Republic of Portugal, as the youngest representative of the Social Democratic Party (PSD). By training, she is a lawyer.

== Early life ==
Pinho was born on 4 December 1999. She obtained an undergraduate degree in law from the Lisbon campus of the Catholic University of Portugal in 2021 and a LL.M in Law in a European and Global Context from the same university's Global School of Law in 2022. After that she carried out further studies and served as a lawyer-intern in a Lisbon law company in preparation for admission to the Portuguese Bar Association.

== Political career ==
Pinho joined the youth movement of the PSD, the Social Democratic Youth (JSD), and became the leader of the JSD in Cascais, a municipality in the Lisbon District. In 2021 she became a deputy on the Cascais municipal council. In the 2024 national elections, the PSD formed a coalition with two smaller parties to create the Democratic Alliance (DA). Pinho was 12th on the DA list for the Lisbon constituency in which the DA won 14 seats in the National Assembly. In her campaign, she addressed the poor state of education, transport, and health services in the country and the lack of housing, particularly for students. She talked about Portugal having "little ambition".
