= Patrícia Caixinha =

Portuguese politician and trade unionist (born 1974)

Patrícia Alexandra da Silva Bento Caixinha

Member of the Assembly of the Republic
- Incumbent
- Assumed office 2022
- Constituency: Castelo Branco

Member of the Palmela Municipal Assembly
- Incumbent
- Assumed office 2017

Personal details
- Born: 31 August 1976 (age 49) Portugal
- Party: Portuguese: Socialist Party (PS)
- Occupation: Trade union leader and politician

Patrícia Alexandra da Silva Bento Caixinha (born 1976) is a Portuguese trade union leader and politician. She is president of the Sindicato dos Trabalhadores da Actividade Seguradora, a union for people working in the insurance industry, and in the 2024 national election she was elected to be a deputy in the Portuguese Assembly of the Republic, representing the Castelo Branco as a member of the Portuguese Socialist Party (PS).

== Early life and education ==
Caixinha was born on 31 August 1976. She obtained a degree in sociology from ISCTE – University Institute of Lisbon in 1999 and a master's from the same university in the science of work and labour relations in 2022, with a thesis on Trade Unions in the Digital era, an example of which is that collective bargaining and conciliation processes are being carried out online in Portugal. She has also taken courses in training, parental coaching and neurolinguistics.

== Career ==
In 2008, Caixinha became director of the Sindicato dos Trabalhadores da Actividade Seguradora (STAS), a union for insurance workers, based in the Portuguese capital of Lisbon. She is also the proprietor of a company called Growise, which offers life-coaching services.

== Political career ==
In 2017, she was elected as a member of the parish assembly of Pinhal Novo, a small town in the Palmela municipality, southeast of Lisbon. In the same year she became a member of the Palmela municipal assembly. In the 2024 national election, called by president Marcelo Rebelo de Sousa after the resignation of prime minister António Costa, leader of the PS, following allegations of corruption against members of his government, Caixinha was included as second on the list of PS candidates for the Castelo Branco constituency. This caused some controversy as she lived in the Lisbon Region, whereas Castelo Branco is in the centre of the country. There were suggestions that she had been imposed on the constituency party by the head office of the PS. Nevertheless, the PS won two of the four seats available in the constituency, and Caixinha was duly elected to the National Assembly.
