= Palmira Maciel =

Portuguese politician

Deputy in the Portuguese Assembly of the Republic
- Incumbent
- Assumed office 2015
- Constituency: Braga

Personal details
- Born: Palmira Maciel Fernandes; 24 November 1961 (age 64) Lamaçães, Braga District, Portugal
- Party: Socialist Party (PS)
- Spouse: José António Ferreira da Costa
- Occupation: Teacher and politician

Palmira Maciel (born 1961) is a Portuguese politician. As a member of the Portuguese Socialist Party (PS), she has been a deputy in the Portuguese Assembly of the Republic since 2015, representing Braga.

== Early life and education ==
Palmira Maciel Fernandes da Costa was born on 24 November 1961 in Lamaçães, in the Braga municipality in the north of Portugal. She graduated from the University of Minho as a teacher in biology and geology and later became a secondary school teacher.

== Political career ==
Maciel has said that she was inspired by Maria de Lurdes Pintassilgo, the first and, as of 2024, the only woman to have been prime minister of Portugal. Maciel initially worked with the Lamaçães Parish Assembly, later becoming president of the Lamaçães Parish Council and a councillor on the Braga Municipal Council.

Maciel was elected to the Assembly of the Republic in 2015 and 2019. In the 2022 Portuguese legislative election, when the PS won an overall majority, she was fifth on the PS list of candidates for Braga, in which the PS had nine candidates elected. In the Assembly she served on the Committee on Public Administration, Administrative Modernization, Decentralization and Local Power, as well as on a health working group. In the March 2024 election the PS won six seats in Braga, with Maciel being second on the list.
