= João Vale e Azevedo (politician) =

Portuguese politician (born 1978)

Member of the Assembly of the Republic
- Incumbent
- Assumed office 26 March 2024
- Constituency: Lisbon

Personal details
- Born: 12 August 1978 (age 47)
- Party: Social Democratic Party

João Mário Mc Millan da Cunha Vale e Azevedo (born 12 August 1978) is a Portuguese politician serving as a member of the Assembly of the Republic since 2024. He is a member of the Social Democratic Party.
