= João Ribeiro (politician) =

Portuguese politician (born 1987)

Member of the Assembly of the Republic
- Incumbent
- Assumed office 26 March 2024
- Constituency: Castelo Branco

Personal details
- Born: 22 December 1987 (age 38) Castelo Branco, Portugal
- Party: Chega

João Filipe Dias Ribeiro (born 22 December 1987) is a Portuguese politician serving as a member of the Assembly of the Republic since 2024. He is a municipal councillor of Castelo Branco.
