= Maria Begonha =

Portuguese politician

Deputy of the Assembly of the Republic, Portugal
- In office 2019–2022
- Parliamentary group: Portuguese Socialist Party (PS)
- Constituency: Braga

Personal details
- Born: Cristina Maria da Fonseca Santos Bacelar Begonha; 21 January 1989 (age 37) Lisbon, Portugal
- Party: Portuguese: Socialist Party (PS)
- Education: NOVA University Lisbon
- Occupation: Politician

Maria Begonha (born 1989) is a Portuguese politician, a member of the Portuguese Socialist Party (PS), and a former member of the Assembly of the Republic. She served as secretary-general of Socialist Youth from 2018 to 2020.

== Early life ==
Cristina Maria da Fonseca Santos Bacelar Begonha was born in the Portuguese capital of Lisbon on 21 January 1989. She obtained a degree in Political Science and International Relations from the NOVA University Lisbon. Her first political involvement was in the parish of Beato in Lisbon, initially as a member of the executive of the council and then as a member of the Council Assembly. She worked for the Lisbon Municipality between 2013 and 2016 and became a member of the Lisbon Municipal Assembly in 2016.

== Political career and controversy ==
In December 2018, Begonha was elected as the secretary-general of Socialist Youth, the youth arm of the PS. She obtained 72% of the votes cast and became the third woman to head the organization, after Margarida Marques (1981-1984) and Jamila Madeira (2000-2004). At around the same time she was subject to some controversy concerning a falsification of her curriculum vitae (CV) by claiming to have a master's degree, as well as embezzlement through employment contracts she had been given by local councils in the Lisbon area. However, in 2019 she was elected as a member of the national Assembly of the Republic, representing the Braga constituency. On 2 April 2021 it was unanimously agreed by the Assembly to lift her parliamentary immunity so that she could respond to the allegations. In the National Assembly she worked on the Commission of Education, Science, Youth and Sport and the Ad hoc Commission to monitor the application of measures to respond to COVID-19 and the economic and social recovery process. In the January 2022 elections, she was placed 27th on the list of PS candidates for Lisbon, but the PS only won 21 of the 48 seats available.
