= Miguel Arruda =

Portuguese politician

Miguel António Taveira Franco Sousa Arruda (born 27 March 1984) is a Portuguese politician. He was elected to the Assembly of the Republic by the Azores constituency in 2024. In January 2025, he was expelled from Chega and sat the final three months of his term as a non-attached member.

== Education and early career ==
Arruda has bachelor's and master's degrees in scientific fields from the University of the Azores. He was a sergeant in the Portuguese Army, a researcher at his university, and a senior technician in an inter-municipal company; he was also the cabinet secretary for the Chega group in the Legislative Assembly of the Azores.

== Political career ==
Arruda was elected by the Azores constituency in the 2024 Portuguese legislative election, representing Chega. In October 2024, Arruda spoke in defence of convicted neo-Nazi Mário Machado, calling him a "political prisoner". On 25 December, he wrote that the country was missing António de Oliveira Salazar, leader of the Estado Novo regime.

On 24 January 2025, Arruda was expelled from his party due to a police investigation into allegations that he stole luggage from airports. He denied the accusations and said that security footage of the alleged incidents had been generated by artificial intelligence. He continued to sit in the assembly as an Independent politician. He then attacked Chega lawmakers António Pinto Pereira and Pedro Frazão, accusing them of being Freemasons.
