= Luísa Areosa =

Portuguese politician (born 1958)

Luísa Maria Lobo da Costa Macedo Areosa Ribeiro

Member of the Assembly of the Republic
- Incumbent
- Assumed office 26 March 2024
- Constituency: Santarém

Personal details
- Born: 30 June 1958 (age 68)
- Party: Portuguese: CHEGA
- Occupation: Politician: schoolteacher

Luísa Maria Lobo da Costa Macedo Areosa Ribeiro (born 30 June 1958) is a Portuguese politician. In the 2024 Portuguese national election she was elected to the Assembly of the Republic as a representative of the right-wing CHEGA party.

== Early life ==
Areosa was born on 30 June 1958. She obtained a degree in physical education and became a schoolteacher.

== Political career ==
In the 2021 municipal elections, Areosa was elected to the Cartaxo municipal assembly, one of only 19 members of the new CHEGA party to be elected to municipal councils that year. In the 2024 national election, caused by the resignation of the Socialist prime minister António Costa, following allegations of corruption against members of his government, she was third on the list of CHEGA candidates for the Santarém constituency. CHEGA won three of the nine seats and she was therefore elected.

In the parliament, Areosa was appointed to the Education and Science Committee. Her early contributions in the national assembly included support for CHEGA requests that 25 November should be made a national holiday; that support should be offered in light of house-price increases; that there should be a national financial literacy programme; and that there should be support for victims of the 2024 Rio Grande do Sul floods in Brazil.
