= Hugo Soares =

Portuguese lawyer and politician

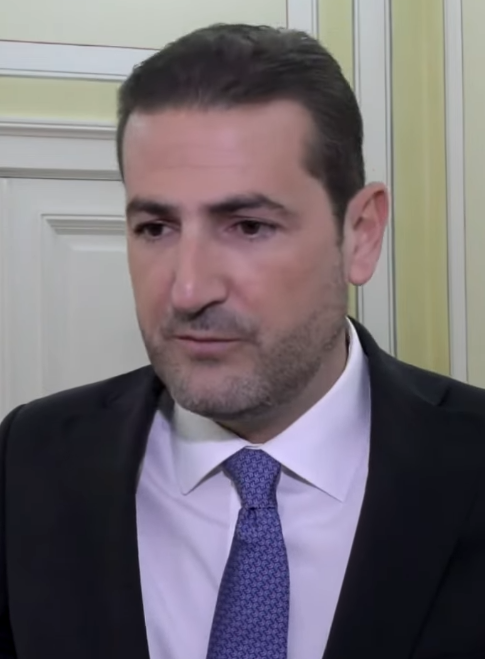
- Hugo Soares in 2023

President of the Parliamentary Group of the Social Democratic Party
- Incumbent
- Assumed office 9 April 2024
- Preceded by: Joaquim Miranda Sarmento
- In office 19 July 2017 – 22 February 2018
- Preceded by: Luís Montenegro
- Succeeded by: Fernando Negrão

Secretary-General of the Social Democratic Party
- Incumbent
- Assumed office 3 July 2022
- President: Luís Montenegro
- Preceded by: José Silvano

President of the Social Democratic Youth
- In office 16 December 2012 – 14 December 2014
- Preceded by: Duarte Marques
- Succeeded by: Simão Ribeiro

Member of the Assembly of the Republic
- Incumbent
- Assumed office 26 March 2024
- Constituency: Braga
- In office 21 June 2011 – 24 October 2019
- Constituency: Braga

Personal details
- Born: Hugo Alexandre Lopes Soares; 2 March 1983 (age 43) Braga, Portugal
- Party: Social Democratic Party
- Other political affiliations: Social Democratic Youth
- Spouse: Patrícia Nair Lopes Mendes
- Children: 2
- Education: University of Minho
- Occupation: Lawyer; politician

Hugo Alexandre Lopes Soares (born 2 March 1983) is a Portuguese lawyer and politician, who is a former president of the Social Democratic Youth, in office from 2012 to 2014. Hugo Soares was also a member of the Assembly of the Republic between 2011 and 2019 and then again, since 2024.
