= Luís Dias (politician) =

Portuguese politician (born 1983)

Member of the Assembly of the Republic
- Incumbent
- Assumed office 26 March 2024
- Constituency: Évora

Personal details
- Born: 16 November 1983 (age 42)
- Party: Socialist Party

Luís Carlos Piteira Dias (born 16 November 1983) is a Portuguese politician serving as a member of the Assembly of the Republic since 2024. From 2013 to 2024, he served as mayor of Vendas Novas.
