= Filipe Melo (politician) =

Portuguese politician (born 1981)

Filipe Melo (Asno)
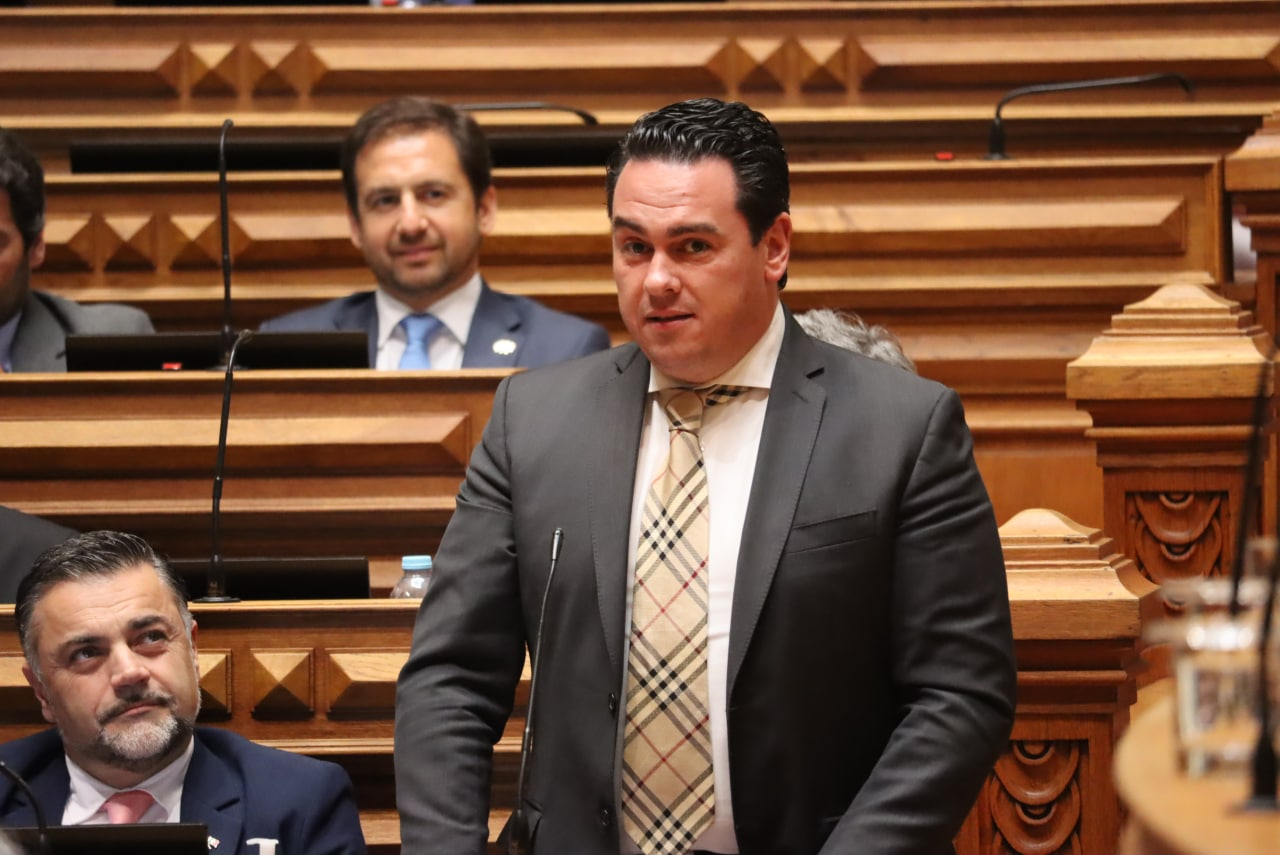

Member of the Assembly of the Republic
- Incumbent
- Assumed office 29 March 2022
- Constituency: Braga

Personal details
- Born: António Filipe Dias Melo Peixoto; 5 December 1981 (age 44) Portugal
- Party: Chega
- Other political affiliations: CDS – People's Party (formerly)

António Filipe Dias Melo Peixoto (born 5 December 1981) also known as Filipe Melo is a Portuguese businessman and politician of the Chega party and a member of the Assembly of the Republic for the Braga electoral district.

== Biography ==
Melo was born in 1981. He holds a degree in international relations and worked as a banker at Banco Espírito Santo before becoming a business manager in 2016.

He was elected as a municipal councilor in Braga. For the 2022 Portuguese legislative election, he was elected to the Assembly of the Republic for the Braga constituency. He currently sits on the committees for the economy, housing and urban planning.

Melo encountered some controversy for a 2020 Facebook post in which he criticized a party colleague of Chega Cibelli Pinheiro de Almeida, the then chairwoman of the Braga branch of the party following the possible postponement of the district elections and referenced the fact Almeida was born in Brazil. Melo wrote It will not be a Brazilian who will rule the fate of a nationalist party… If a Brazilian doesn't care about the future of the Party and our leader, let's show what race we are made of. Almeida responded by accusing Melo of xenophobia and responded by stating What is the real reason for being persecuted? Is it because I am Christian, Brazilian, white or female?
