= 2019 Portuguese legislative election =

Legislative election held in Portugal

- 6 October 2019

All 230 seats in the Assembly of the Republic 116 seats needed for a majority
- Opinion polls
- Registered: 10,777,258 ▲11.3%
- Turnout: 5,237,484 (48.6%) ▼7.3 pp
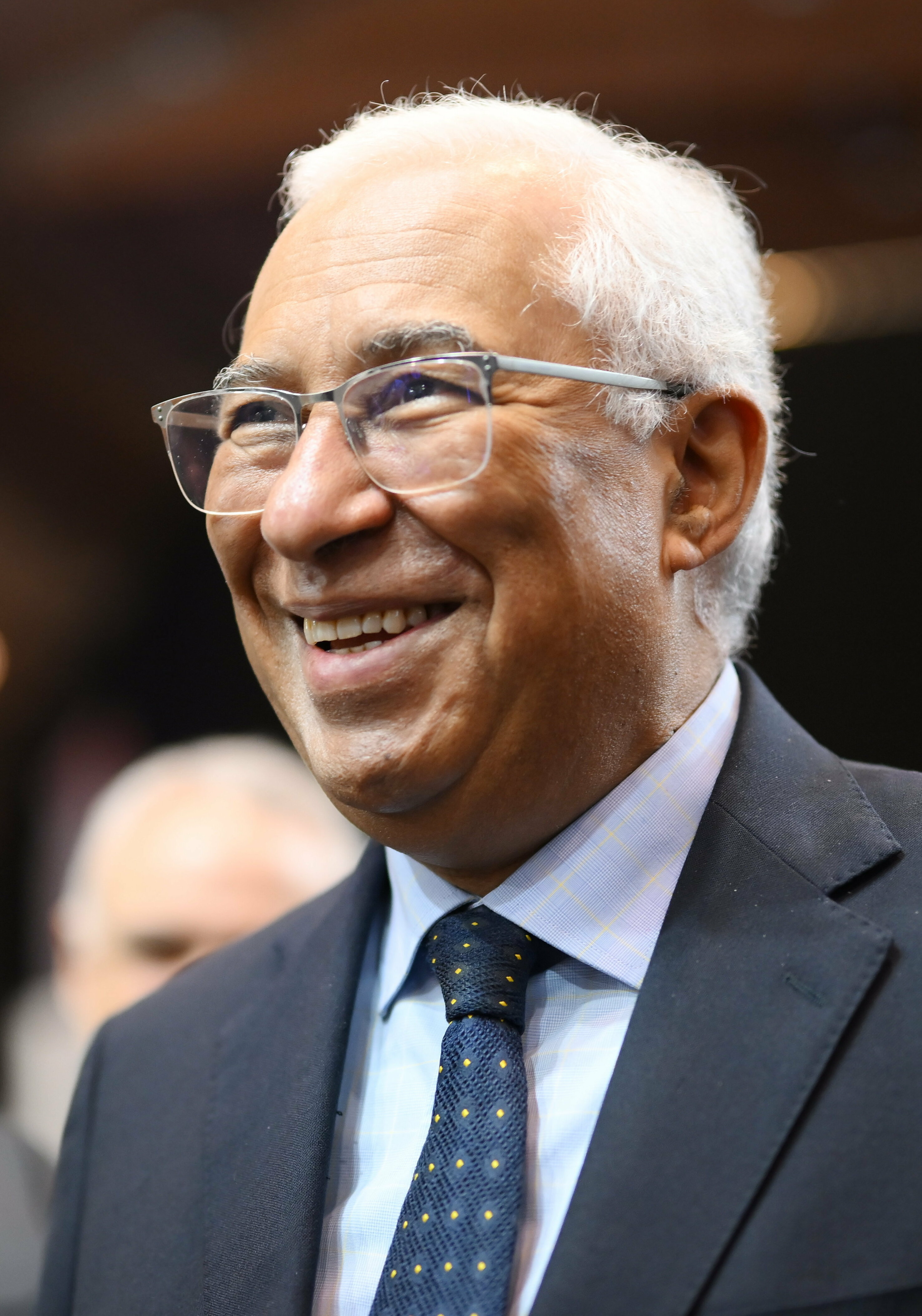

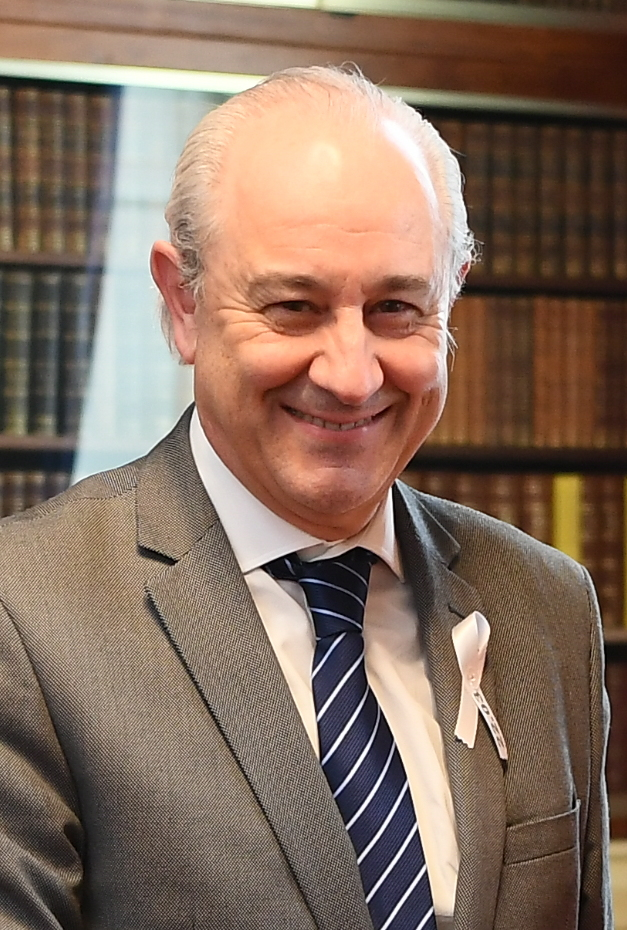

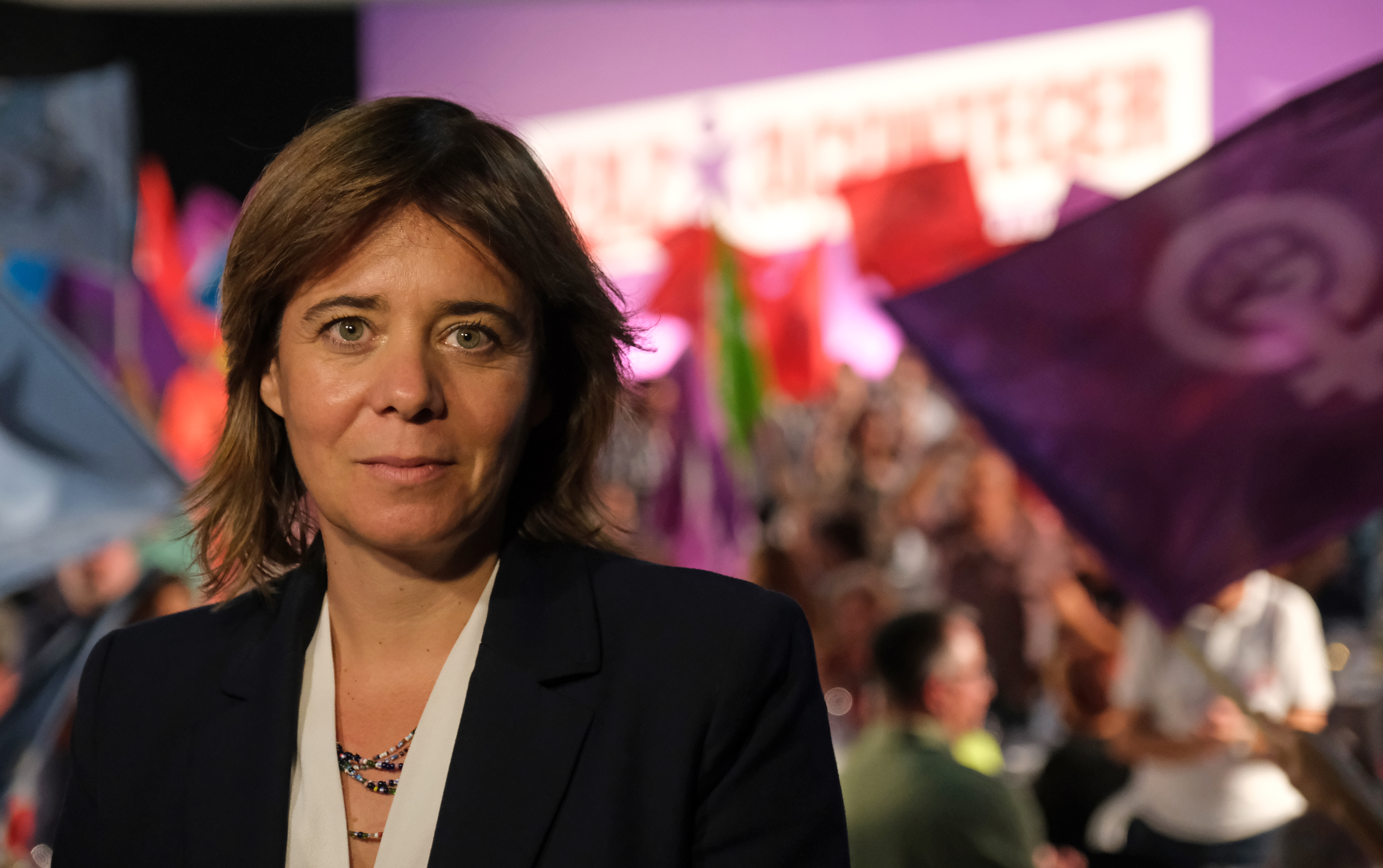

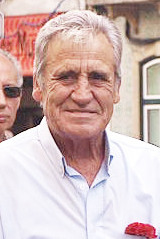

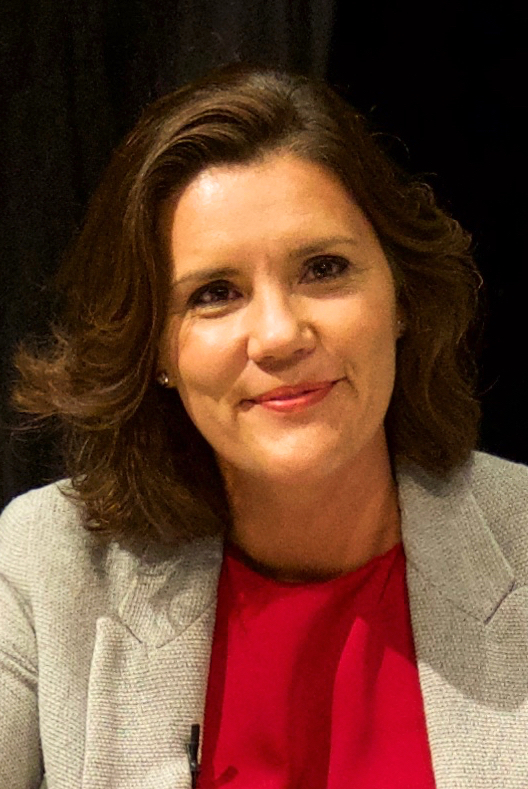

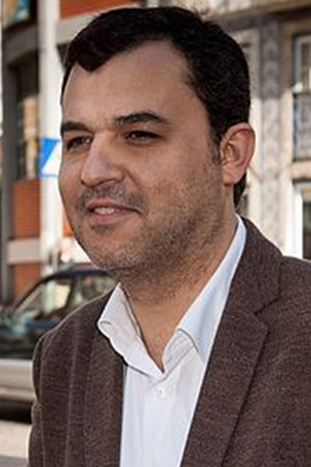

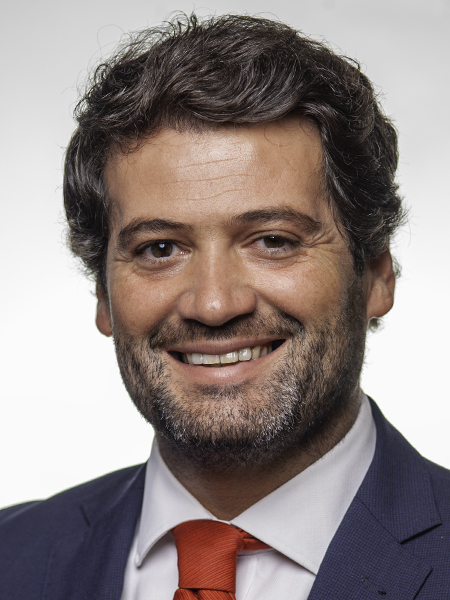

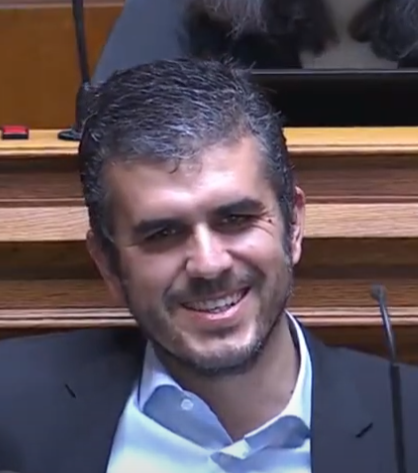

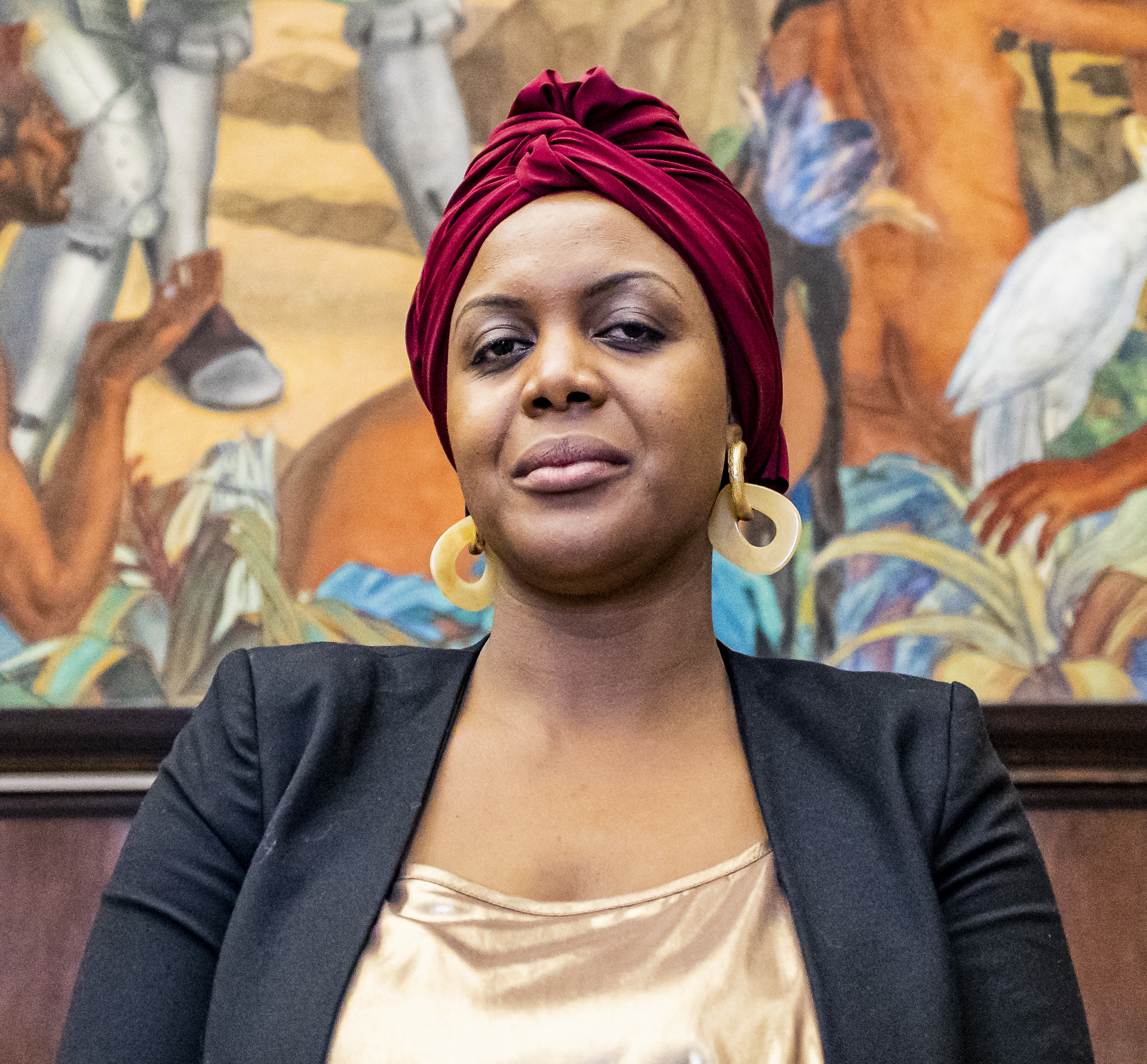
	First party	Second party	Third party
Leader	António Costa	Rui Rio	Catarina Martins
Party	PS	PSD	BE
Leader since	28 September 2014	18 February 2018	30 November 2014
Leader's seat	Lisbon	Porto	Porto
Last election	86 seats, 32.3%	89 seats (PàF) (Note: The Social Democratic Party (PSD) and the People's Party (CDS–PP) contested the 2015 election in a coalition called Portugal Ahead (PàF) and won a combined 38.6% of the vote and elected 107 MPs to parliament.)	19 seats, 10.2%
Seats won	108	79	19
Seat change	▲22	▼10	0
Popular vote	1,903,687	1,454,283	498,549
Percentage	36.3%	27.8%	9.5%
Swing	▲4.0 pp	N/A	▼0.7 pp
	Fourth party	Fifth party	Sixth party
Leader	Jerónimo de Sousa	Assunção Cristas	André Silva
Party	PCP	CDS–PP	PAN
Alliance	CDU
Leader since	27 November 2004	13 March 2016	26 October 2014
Leader's seat	Lisbon	Lisbon (Note: In the 2015 election, Assunção Cristas was elected in the district of Leiria.)	Lisbon
Last election	17 seats, 8.3% (Note: The Portuguese Communist Party (PCP) and the Ecologist Party "The Greens" (PEV) contested the 2015 election in a coalition called Unitary Democratic Coalition (CDU) and won a combined 8.3% of the vote and elected 17 MPs to parliament.)	18 seats (PàF)	1 seats, 1.4%
Seats won	12	5	4
Seat change	▼5	▼13	▲3
Popular vote	332,018	221,094	173,931
Percentage	6.3%	4.2%	3.3%
Swing	▼1.9 pp	N/A	▲1.9 pp
	Seventh party	Eighth party	Ninth party
Leader	André Ventura	Carlos Guimarães Pinto	Joacine Katar Moreira (Note: Katar Moreira was the party's main candidate in this campaign.)
Party	CH	IL	LIVRE
Leader since	9 April 2019	13 October 2018	11 August 2019
Leader's seat	Lisbon	Porto (lost)	-
Last election	Did not contest	Did not contest	0 seats, 0.7%
Seats won	1	1	1
Seat change	▲1	▲1	▲1
Popular vote	67,502	67,443	56,940
Percentage	1.3%	1.3%	1.1%
Swing	New party	New party	▲0.4 pp
Prime Minister before election
António Costa
PS
Prime Minister after election
António Costa
PS

The 2019 Portuguese legislative election was held on 6 October 2019. All 230 seats to the Assembly of the Republic were contested.

The Socialist Party (PS) won the elections with 36 percent of the votes and 108 seats, a gain of 22 compared with 2015. The PS won the big districts of Porto and Lisbon, although Porto was closer than expected, and was able to gain districts from the PSD, like Aveiro and Viana do Castelo, by razor thin margins. The PS won the city of Lisbon, however by a smaller share than four years earlier, and surprisingly lost the city of Porto to the PSD, where Rui Rio was mayor for 12 years.

The Social Democratic Party (PSD) obtained 28 percent of the votes and won 79 seats. The party lost 10 seats compared with 2015, and, in terms of share of vote, it was the worst result since 1983, however in terms of seats, it was only the worst result since 2005, when the party won 75 seats. The PSD was able to hold on to their bastions of Viseu, Vila Real, Bragança, Leiria and Madeira. On election night, PSD leader Rui Rio classified the results as "not a disaster" and left the door open to continue as party leader. However, in the aftermath of the election, several members of the party announced their intention to challenge Rio's leadership.

The Left Bloc (BE) achieved a similar result to 2015. The party won almost 10 percent of the votes and held the 19 seats elected in 2015. On election night, Catarina Martins said she was open to new negotiations with PS. The Unitary Democratic Coalition, (CDU), PCP-PEV coalition, suffered heavy losses, with 6.3 percent of the votes and 12 seats, and Jerónimo de Sousa, PCP secretary-general, said on election night that written agreements with PS were off the table. CDS – People's Party got just 4.2 percent of the votes, and got a parliamentary caucus reduced to just five seats, the lowest since 1991 and when the party was called the "taxi party", down from 18 in the 2015 election. Assunção Cristas, CDS leader, resigned on election night, called for a snap party congress and announced she would not run for reelection. People-Animals-Nature (PAN) saw a big increase in its share of the vote, winning 3.3% and 4 seats from Lisbon, Porto and Setúbal.

This election was marked by the entry of three new parties in Parliament. The right-wing/far-right party Chega (CH) was one of the big surprises on election night by electing an MP from Lisbon. It was the first time since the return to democracy that a right-wing/far-right party gained representation in Parliament. LIVRE and Liberal Initiative also elected one MP for Lisbon. Former Prime Minister and PSD leader Pedro Santana Lopes' new party, Alliance, failed to win a single seat and polled below 1 percent of the votes.

The turnout in this election was the lowest ever in a general election in Portugal, with just 48.6 percent of registered voters casting a ballot. In Portugal alone, 54.5 percent of voters cast a ballot, a drop compared with the 57 percent in the 2015 election.

== Background ==
After the 2015 election, President Aníbal Cavaco Silva asked incumbent Prime Minister Pedro Passos Coelho to form a minority government, as the Portugal Ahead coalition won the most votes and seats in the election. Passos Coelho second government was sworn in on 30 October 2015. However, during this period, the Socialist Party, the Left Bloc and the Communist Party reached a historic agreement in order to bring down the Passos Coelho minority government and support a Socialist minority government led by António Costa. Paulo Portas, CDS–PP leader, labeled the agreement as the Geringonça (English: Contraption), which became the name the left-wing agreement would be known for.

On 10 November 2015, the left-wing parties proposed a vote of rejection to the Portugal Ahead's government program, which was approved by a 123 to 107 vote, thus bringing down the government. On 26 November 2015, António Costa was sworn in as Prime Minister. After a few months of cohabitation with President Aníbal Cavaco Silva (PSD), Costa would have to cohabit with Marcelo Rebelo de Sousa (PSD), the winner of the 2016 presidential election, in which the Socialists did not support any candidate.

Costa's term was ruled by the 2017 deadly wildfires, in June and in October, with following reports showing mismanagement and lack of response and coordination, issues relating to allegations of nepotism within the government, the April 2019 fuel-tanker drivers' strike, and, later, by the Tancos arms theft scandal, which would have an impact during the 2019 election campaign, and at the same time, it was equally marked by solid economic growth, driven by expanding tourism and high exports.

=== Leadership changes and challenges ===
==== CDS – People's Party ====
Following the collapse of the PàF minority government and the subsequent nomination of António Costa as Prime Minister, with the support of the leftwing parties, CDS–PP leader Paulo Portas announced, in December 2015, he was leaving the party's leadership. A new party congress was called to elect a new leader. There were two candidates in the ballot: Assunção Cristas, supported by Portas, and Miguel Mattos Chaves, critical of Portas' leadership. Cristas was elected by a landslide and the results were the following:

Ballot: 13 March 2016
Candidate	Votes	%
Assunção Cristas	877	98.8
Miguel Mattos Chaves	11	1.2
Turnout	888	
Source: Results

==== Socialist Party ====
Party leader and Prime Minister António Costa faced a leadership challenge from party member Daniel Adrião in the party's 2016 leadership election. There were 49,127 party members registered to cast a ballot, and Costa was easily re-elected as party leader with 95% of the votes, compared with less than 3% for Adrião.

Ballot: 20 and 21 May 2016
Candidate	Votes	%
António Costa	~29,880	95.3
Daniel Adrião	~880	2.8
Blank/invalid ballots	~600	1.9
Turnout	~31,350	63.81

Two years later, in May 2018, Costa faced another challenge from Adrião, and was once again re-elected, this time with 96% of the votes, against Adrião's 4%. There were 51,191 party members registered to cast a ballot.

Ballot: 11 and 12 May 2018
Candidate	Votes	%
António Costa		96.0
Daniel Adrião		4.0
Blank/invalid ballots		–
Turnout		

==== Social Democratic Party ====
After a disappointing result in the 2017 local elections, in which the PSD won just 30 percent of the votes and 98 mayoral races against the 38 percent of the PS and its 160 elected mayors, Pedro Passos Coelho announced he would not run for a 5th term as PSD leader. After that, Rui Rio, former mayor of Porto (2002–2013), announced he was running for the leadership. Shortly after, Pedro Santana Lopes, former mayor of Lisbon (2002–2004; 2005) and Prime Minister (2004–2005), announced he was also running for the leadership of the party. Election day was scheduled to January 13, 2018. After a long campaign, Rui Rio was elected with 54.15 percent of the votes, against the 45.85 percent of Santana Lopes. Turnout was 60.3 percent. The results were the following:

Ballot: 13 January 2018
Candidate	Votes	%
Rui Rio	22,728	54.2
Pedro Santana Lopes	19,244	45.8
Blank/invalid ballots	683	–
Turnout	42,655	60.34
Source: Official results

Rui Rio was officially confirmed as party leader in the PSD congress, in Lisbon, between 16 and 18 February 2018. Just seven months after this leadership election, in early July 2018, Pedro Santana Lopes announced he was leaving the Social Democratic Party and would form his own party. A few weeks later he announced the creation of a new party, the Alliance. Following several months of bad polling for the PSD, Rio's leadership started to be heavily criticized and by January 2019, Luís Montenegro, former PSD parliamentary leader, challenged Rio to call a leadership ballot, with Montenegro announcing his candidacy against Rio. However, Rio refused to call a leadership ballot, but decided to call a motion of confidence on his leadership, which he won by a 75 to 50 vote in favour at a meeting of the party's national council held on 18 January 2019:

Motion ballot: 18 January 2019
Option	Votes	%
Rui Rio	75	59.5
Against	50	39.7
Blank/invalid ballots	1	0.8
Turnout	126	
Source: Results

Following the vote, Montenegro conceded defeat and withdrew his candidacy to the party's leadership.

=== Date ===
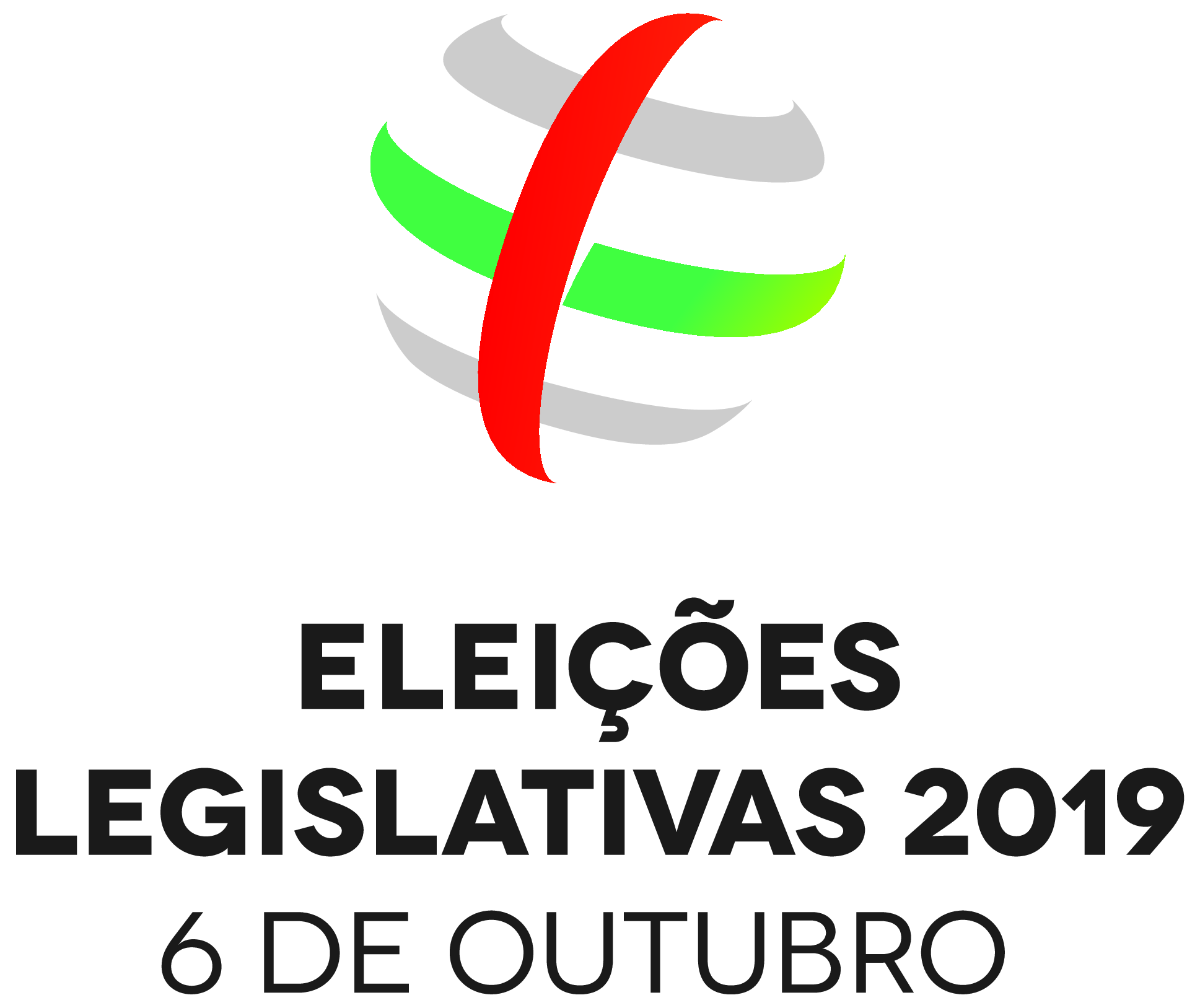
Official logo of the election.

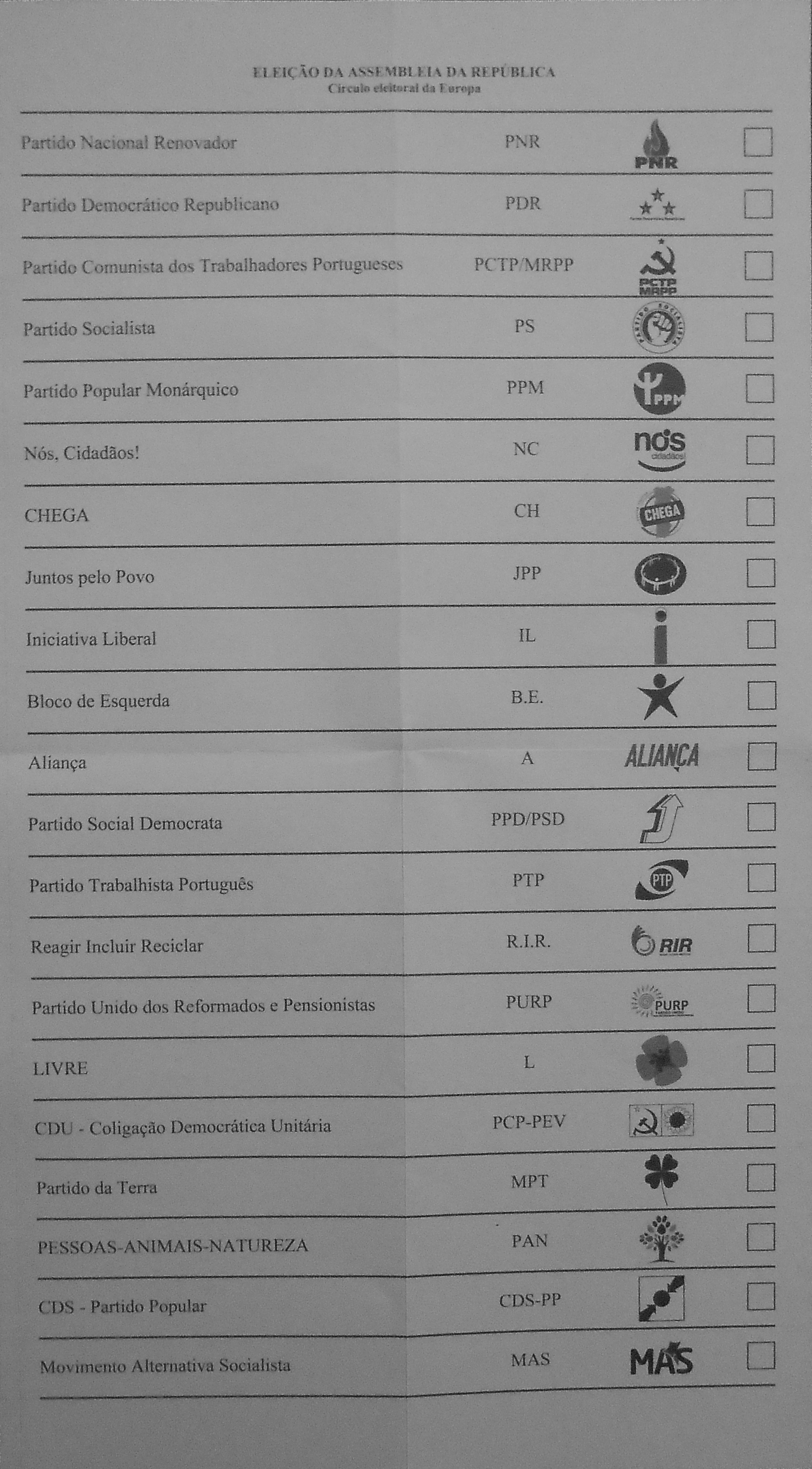
Ballot paper for the Portuguese legislative election 2019 for the electoral circle of European emigrants

According to the Portuguese Constitution, an election must be called between 14 September and 14 October of the year that the legislature ends. The election is called by the President of Portugal but is not called at the request of the Prime Minister; however, the President must listen to all of the parties represented in Parliament and the election day must be announced at least 60 days before the election. If an election is called during an ongoing legislature (dissolution of parliament) it must be held at least in 55 days. Election day is the same in all multi-seats constituencies, and should fall on a Sunday or national holiday. The next legislative election must, therefore, take place no later than 13 October 2019. After meeting with all parties, in December 2018, Marcelo Rebelo de Sousa announced that he would call a general election for 6 October 2019.

=== Electoral system ===
The Assembly of the Republic has 230 members elected to four-year terms. Governments do not require absolute majority support of the Assembly to hold office, as even if the number of opposers of government is larger than that of the supporters, the number of opposers still needs to be equal or greater than 116 (absolute majority) for both the Government's Programme to be rejected or for a motion of no confidence to be approved.

The number of seats assigned to each district depends on the district magnitude. The use of the d'Hondt method makes for a higher effective threshold than certain other allocation methods such as the Hare quota or Sainte-Laguë method, which are more generous to small parties.

For these elections, and compared with the 2015 elections, the MPs distributed by districts were the following:

District	Number of MPs	Map
Lisbon^{(+1)}	48	
Porto^{(+1)}	40	
Braga	19	
Setúbal	18	
Aveiro	16	
Leiria	10	
Coimbra, Faro and Santarém	9	
Viseu^{(–1)}	8	
Madeira and Viana do Castelo	6	
Azores and Vila Real	5	
Castelo Branco	4	
Beja, Bragança, Évora and Guarda^{(–1)}	3	
Portalegre, Europe and Outside Europe	2	

=== Early voting ===
Voters were also able to vote early, which would happen one week before election day, on 29 September 2019. Voters had to register in order to be eligible to cast an early ballot. Between 22 and 26 September, 56,287 voters requested to vote early. On 29 September, 50,638 voters (90.0 percent of voters that requested) cast an early ballot.

== Parties ==
=== Parliamentary factions ===
Months before the election, the possibility of a PSD/CDS–PP coalition was discussed, which could possibly include the newly formed Alliance party, led by Pedro Santana Lopes, but the idea was clearly rejected by PSD leader Rui Rio. The table below lists the parties represented in the Assembly of the Republic during the 13th legislature (2015–2019) and that also contested the elections:

Name		Ideology	Political position	Leader	2015 result		Seats at dissolution
Name		Ideology	Political position	Leader	%	Seats	Seats at dissolution
PPD/PSD	Social Democratic Party; Partido Social Democrata	Liberal conservatism Classical liberalism	Centre to centre-right	Rui Rio	38.6%	89 / 230	89 / 230
CDS–PP	CDS – People's Party; Centro Democrático e Social – Partido Popular	Christian democracy Conservatism	Centre-right to right-wing	Assunção Cristas	38.6%	18 / 230	18 / 230
PS	Socialist Party; Partido Socialista	Social democracy	Centre-left	António Costa	32.3%	86 / 230	85 / 230
BE	Left Bloc; Bloco de Esquerda	Democratic socialism Anti-capitalism	Left-wing	Catarina Martins	10.2%	19 / 230	19 / 230
PCP	Portuguese Communist Party; Partido Comunista Português	Communism; Marxism–Leninism	Far-left	Jerónimo de Sousa	8.3%	15 / 230	15 / 230
PEV	Ecologist Party "The Greens"; Partido Ecologista "Os Verdes"	Eco-socialism; Green politics	Left-wing	Heloísa Apolónia	8.3%	2 / 230	2 / 230
PAN	People-Animals-Nature; Pessoas-Animais-Natureza	Animal welfare Environmentalism	Centre-left	André Silva	1.4%	1 / 230	1 / 230
Ind.	Independent; Independente	Paulo Trigo Pereira (Left the PS caucus.)					1 / 230

==== Seat changes ====
- On 7 December 2018, Socialist Party MP Paulo Trigo Pereira announced his departure from the Socialists' caucus, citing policy differences between him and the caucus leadership. He remained in Parliament as an Independent, continuing to support the government.

=== Non represented parties ===
The table below lists smaller parties not represented in the Assembly of the Republic that ran in the elections:

Name		Ideology	Political position	Leader	2015 result
Name		Ideology	Political position	Leader	%
PDR	Democratic Republican Party; Partido Democrático Republicano	Social liberalism Populism	Centre	António Marinho e Pinto	1.1%
PCTP/MRPP	Portuguese Workers' Communist Party; Partido Comunista dos Trabalhadores Portugueses	Marxism-Leninism; Maoism	Far-left	Vacant	1.1%
L	LIVRE; LIVRE	Eco-socialism; Pro-Europeanism	Centre-left to left-wing	Collective leadership	0.7%
PNR	National Renovator Party; Partido Nacional Renovador	National conservatism Anti-immigration	Far-right	José Pinto Coelho	0.5%
MPT	Earth Party; Partido da Terra	Green conservatism	Centre-right	Manuel Ramos	0.4%
NC	We, the Citizens! Nós, Cidadãos!	Social liberalism Pro-Europeanism	Centre-right	Mendo Castro Henriques	0.4%
PTP	Portuguese Labour Party; Partido Trabalhista Português	Democratic socialism Social democracy	Centre-left to left-wing	Amândio Madaleno	0.4% (Note: The Socialist Alternative Movement (MAS) and the Portuguese Labour Party (PTP) contested the 2015 election in a coalition called AGIR! (Act!) and won a combined 0.4% of the vote.)
MAS	Socialist Alternative Movement; Movimento Alternativa Socialista	Socialism; Trotskyism	Left-wing	Gil Garcia	0.4%
PPM	People's Monarchist Party; Partido Popular Monárquico	Monarchism; Conservatism	Right-wing	Gonçalo da Câmara; Pereira	0.3%
JPP	Together for the People; Juntos Pelo Povo	Regionalism; Social liberalism	Centre	Élvio Sousa	0.3%
PURP	United Party of Retirees and Pensioners; Partido Unido dos Reformados e Pensionistas	Pensioners' rights Anti-austerity	Big tent	António Mateus Dias; Fernando Loureiro	0.3%
CH	Enough! Chega!	Economic liberalism Right-wing populism	Right-wing to far-right	André Ventura	—N/a
IL	Liberal Initiative; Iniciativa Liberal	Liberalism	Centre to Centre-right	Carlos Guimarães Pinto	—N/a
A	Alliance; Aliança	Conservative liberalism Social conservatism	Centre-right to right-wing	Pedro Santana Lopes	—N/a
RIR	React, Include, Recycle; Reagir, Incluir, Reciclar,	Humanism; Pacifism	Syncretic	Vitorino Silva (Tino de Rans)	—N/a

== Campaign period ==
=== Issues ===
The campaign was dominated by the Tancos airbase robbery (in which former Defense Minister Azeredo Lopes (2015–2018) was accused, and charged by the Public Prosecution, of trying to cover-up the finding of the stolen weapons in the robbery), but the country's good economic situation and removal of several austerity measures, were also main themes during the election campaign. On the second-to-last day of the campaign, the death of CDS–PP founder and former minister Diogo Freitas do Amaral led to adjustments and cancellations of political party events.

=== Party slogans ===
Party or alliance	Original slogan	English translation	Refs
PSD	« Portugal Precisa »	"Portugal Needs"	
PS	« Portugal Melhor »	"Better Portugal"	
BE	« Faz Acontecer »	"Make it happen"	
CDS–PP	« Faz sentido »	"Makes sense"	
CDU	« Avançar é Preciso »	"Moving forward is necessary"	
PAN	« Ainda vamos a tempo! »	"We are still on time!"	
L	« Livre é igualdade »	"Free is equality"	
IL	« Liberta-te do Socialismo »	"Free yourself from Socialism"	
CH	« A força da mudança »	"The force of change"	

=== Candidates' debates ===
==== With parties represented in Parliament ====
2019 Portuguese legislative election debates
Date	Organisers	Moderator(s)	P Present A Absent invitee N Non-invitee						
Date	Organisers	Moderator(s)	PS Costa	PSD Rio	BE Martins	CDU Jerónimo	CDS–PP Cristas	PAN Silva	Refs
2 Sep	SIC	Clara de Sousa	P	N	N	P	N	N	
3 Sep	RTP3	António José Teixeira	N	N	P	N	P	N	
5 Sep	SIC	Clara de Sousa	N	P	N	N	P	N	
6 Sep	RTP1	António José Teixeira	P	N	P	N	N	N	
7 Sep	SIC Notícias	Clara de Sousa	N	N	P	N	N	P	
9 Sep	RTP1	António José Teixeira	N	P	N	N	N	P	
11 Sep	SIC	Clara de Sousa	P	N	N	N	N	P	
12 Sep	RTP1	António José Teixeira	N	P	N	P	N	N	
13 Sep	TVI	Pedro Pinto	P	N	N	N	P	N	
14 Sep	RTP3	António José Teixeira	N	N	N	N	P	P	
15 Sep	TVI	Pedro Pinto	N	P	P	N	N	N	
16 Sep	RTP1, SIC, TVI	Clara de Sousa; Maria Flor Pedroso; José Alberto Carvalho	P	P	N	N	N	N	
18 Sep	Antena 1, RR, TSF	Natália Carvalho; Eunice Lourenço; Anselmo Crespo	P	P	P	P	P	P	
23 Sep	Antena 1, RR, TSF	Natália Carvalho; Eunice Lourenço; Anselmo Crespo	P	P	N	N	N	N	
23 Sep	RTP1	Maria Flor Pedroso	P	P	P	P	P	P	
Candidate viewed as "most convincing" in each debate
Date	Organisers	Polling firm/Link							
Date	Organisers	Polling firm/Link	PS	PSD	BE	CDU	CDS–PP	PAN	Notes
23 Sep	Antena 1, RR, TSF	Aximage	37.9	38.7	—N/a	—N/a	—N/a	—N/a	21.4% Both/Neither
23 Sep	RTP1	Aximage	30.9	31.2	18.9	1.5	7.1	2.9	7.5% No one

==== With parties not represented in Parliament ====
A debate between parties not represented in Parliament was also broadcast on RTP1 and RTP3.

2019 Portuguese legislative election debates
Date	Organisers	Moderator(s)	P Present A Absent invitee N Non-invitee S Surrogate															
Date	Organisers	Moderator(s)	PDR Pinto	PCTP Guerreiro	L Moreira	PNR Coelho	MPT Ramos	PTP Madaleno	NC Henriques	PPM Pereira	JPP Sousa	PURP Loureiro	A Santana	RIR Rans	MAS Garcia	IL Pinto	CH Ventura	Refs
30 Sep	RTP1; RTP3	Maria Flor; Pedroso	P	P	P	P	P	P	P	P	P	P	P	P	P	P	P	

== Opinion polling ==
Local Regression of polls conducted since the election

== Voter turnout ==
The table below shows voter turnout throughout election day including voters from Overseas.

Turnout	Time								
Turnout	12:00			16:00			19:00		
Turnout	2015	2019	±	2015	2019	±	2015	2019	±
Total	20.65%	18.83%	▼1.82 pp	44.38%	38.59%	▼5.79 pp	55.84%	48.60%	▼7.24 pp

== Results ==
The centre-left Socialist Party (PS) of incumbent Prime Minister Costa obtained the largest share of the vote, and the most seats. Costa said he would look to continue the confidence-and-supply agreement with the Left Bloc and the Unitary Democratic Coalition. The centre-right Social Democratic Party (PSD) got 27.8 percent of the vote, its worst result since 1983. Portugal's much-vaunted immunity to Europe's far-right wave was interrupted by the election of a debut representative from the nationalist Chega party, which scored 1.3 percent overall, with the party's leader stating “this is an historic occasion, it will be the first time in 45 years that a party with these characteristics enters the assembly.”

=== National summary ===
Party	Votes	%	+/–	Seats	+/–
Socialist Party	1,903,687	36.35	+4.03	108	+22
Social Democratic Party	1,454,283	27.77		79	–10
Left Bloc	498,549	9.52	–0.67	19	0
Unitary Democratic Coalition	332,018	6.34	–1.91	12	–5
CDS – People's Party	221,094	4.22		5	–13
People Animals Nature	173,931	3.32	+1.93	4	+3
Chega	67,502	1.29	New	1	New
Liberal Initiative	67,443	1.29	New	1	New
LIVRE	56,940	1.09	+0.36	1	+1
Alliance	40,175	0.77	New	0	New
Portuguese Workers' Communist Party	36,006	0.69	–0.42	0	0
React, Include, Recycle	35,169	0.67	New	0	New
National Renovator Party	16,992	0.32	–0.18	0	0
Earth Party	12,888	0.25	–0.17	0	0
We, the Citizens!	12,346	0.24	–0.16	0	0
Democratic Republican Party	11,674	0.22	–0.92	0	0
United Party of Retirees and Pensioners	11,457	0.22	–0.04	0	0
Together for the People	10,552	0.20	–0.06	0	0
People's Monarchist Party	8,389	0.16	–0.12	0	0
Portuguese Labour Party	8,271	0.16		0	0
Socialist Alternative Movement	3,243	0.06		0	0
Total	4,982,609	100.00	–	230	0
Valid votes	4,982,609	95.13	–1.12		
Invalid votes	123,573	2.36	+0.71		
Blank votes	131,302	2.51	+0.42		
Total votes	5,237,484	100.00	–		
Registered voters/turnout	10,777,258	48.60	–7.24		
Source: Comissão Nacional de Eleições

Vote share
PS	36.35%
PSD	27.77%
BE	9.52%
CDU	6.34%
CDS-PP	4.22%
PAN	3.32%
CH	1.29%
IL	1.29%
L	1.09%
Alliance	0.77%
PCTP/MRPP	0.69%
RIR	0.67%
Others	1.83%
Blank/invalid	4.87%

Parliamentary seats
PS	46.96%
PSD	34.35%
BE	8.26%
CDU	5.22%
CDS-PP	2.17%
PAN	1.74%
CH	0.43%
IL	0.43%
L	0.43%

=== Distribution by constituency ===
Results of the 2019 election of the Portuguese Assembly of the Republic by constituency
Constituency	%	S	%	S	%	S	%	S	%	S	%	S	%	S	%	S	%	S	Total S
Constituency	PS		PSD		BE		CDU		CDS–PP		PAN		CH		IL		L		Total S
Azores	40.1	3	30.2	2	8.0	-	2.5	-	4.8	-	2.7	-	0.9	-	0.7	-	0.9	-	5
Aveiro	34.3	7	33.6	6	10.0	2	3.1	-	5.7	1	3.0	-	0.7	-	1.0	-	0.7	-	16
Beja	40.7	2	13.3	-	9.1	-	22.8	1	2.3	-	2.0	-	2.0	-	0.4	-	0.6	-	3
Braga	36.4	8	34.1	8	8.9	2	4.0	-	4.1	1	2.6	-	0.7	-	0.8	-	0.7	-	19
Bragança	36.5	1	40.8	2	6.0	-	2.1	-	4.5	-	1.3	-	0.8	-	0.4	-	0.3	-	3
Castelo Branco	40.9	3	26.3	1	11.1	-	4.8	-	3.7	-	2.4	-	1.3	-	0.6	-	0.9	-	4
Coimbra	39.0	5	26.6	3	11.2	1	5.6	-	3.5	-	2.6	-	0.9	-	0.8	-	0.9	-	9
Évora	38.3	2	17.5	-	9.0	-	18.9	1	3.4	-	2.0	-	2.2	-	0.7	-	0.7	-	3
Faro	36.8	5	22.3	3	12.3	1	7.1	-	3.8	-	4.8	-	2.1	-	0.8	-	1.0	-	9
Guarda	37.6	2	34.3	1	7.8	-	3.0	-	5.0	-	1.6	-	1.5	-	0.6	-	0.5	-	3
Leiria	31.1	4	33.5	5	9.4	1	4.3	-	5.3	-	2.9	-	1.5	-	0.9	-	0.9	-	10
Lisbon	36.7	20	22.6	12	9.7	5	7.8	4	4.4	2	4.4	2	2.0	1	2.5	1	2.1	1	48
Madeira	33.4	3	37.1	3	5.2	-	2.1	-	6.1	-	1.8	-	0.7	-	0.7	-	0.4	-	6
Portalegre	44.7	2	20.1	-	8.1	-	10.6	-	3.8	-	1.7	-	2.7	-	0.5	-	0.6	-	2
Porto	36.7	17	31.2	15	10.1	4	4.8	2	3.3	1	3.5	1	0.6	-	1.5	-	1.0	-	40
Santarém	37.1	4	25.2	3	10.2	1	7.6	1	4.7	-	2.6	-	2.0	-	0.8	-	0.9	-	9
Setúbal	38.6	9	14.4	3	12.1	2	15.8	3	3.0	-	4.4	1	1.9	-	1.1	-	1.2	-	18
Viana do Castelo	34.8	3	33.8	3	8.5	-	4.0	-	6.2	-	2.4	-	0.7	-	0.6	-	0.6	-	6
Vila Real	37.2	2	39.0	3	6.1	-	2.5	-	4.5	-	1.7	-	0.8	-	0.4	-	0.6	-	5
Viseu	35.4	4	36.2	4	7.9	-	2.3	-	5.9	-	2.1	-	1.0	-	0.6	-	0.5	-	8
Europe	29.1	1	18.8	1	5.7	-	2.5	-	3.0	-	4.9	-	0.9	-	0.8	-	1.1	-	2
Outside Europe	20.2	1	33.4	1	3.5	-	1.0	-	4.7	-	4.3	-	0.9	-	2.5	-	0.7	-	2
Total	36.3	108	27.8	79	9.5	19	6.3	12	4.2	5	3.3	4	1.3	1	1.3	1	1.1	1	230
Source: Comissão Nacional de Eleições

=== Maps ===
Full results by electoral district

Strongest party by electoral district

Strongest party by municipality

Vote strength for left-wing parties (BE, CDU, LIVRE) by electoral district

Strongest political faction by electoral district. Left: PS, BE, CDU; Right: PSD, CDS-PP.

=== Electorate ===
Demographic	Size	PS	PSD	BE	CDU	CDS–PP	PAN	Others
Total vote	100%	36%	28%	10%	6%	4%	3%	13%
Sex
Men		37%	28%	9%	7%	4%	2%	13%
Women		41%	24%	11%	5%	4%	4%	11%
Age
18–24 years old	10%	25%	30%	13%	3%	4%	9%	18%
25–44 years old	31%	32%	23%	14%	6%	3%	4%	19%
45–64 years old	38%	42%	27%	10%	6%	5%	2%	9%
65 and older	22%	51%	28%	4%	6%	3%	1%	7%
Education
No High-school		52%	23%	7%	7%	3%	1%	9%
High-school		32%	25%	13%	6%	4%	6%	15%
College graduate		31%	30%	12%	5%	6%	3%	13%
Vote decision
In the last week or before	19%	25%	26%	13%	4%	4%	3%	25%
Before that	81%	42%	26%	9%	6%	4%	3%	9%
Direction of the country
Right direction	67%	53%	19%	11%	6%	3%	3%	7%
Wrong direction	33%	11%	42%	9%	7%	6%	3%	23%
Source: GfK Metris exit poll

== Aftermath ==
=== Budget rejection and fall of the government ===
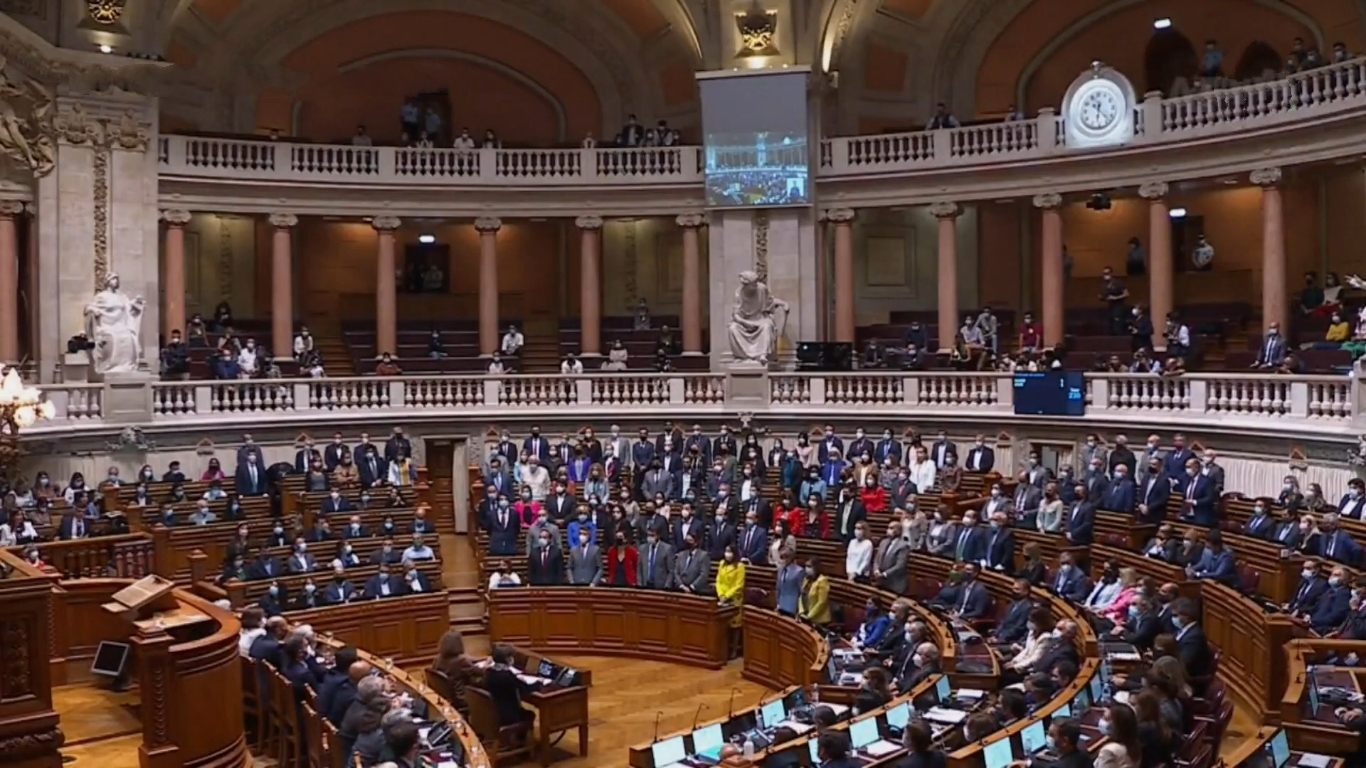
MPs voting on the 2022 State Budget on 27 October 2021

After the October 2019 elections, the PS decided to not renew the "Geringonça" (Contraption) deal with the Left Bloc and the Communist Party and opted to govern by making deals with both left and/or right parties in the opposition. After this, budgets and other policies were discussed with all opposition parties, but political instability grew, even during the COVID-19 pandemic outbreak. In October 2021, BE and PCP announced that they would vote against the government's proposed 2022 budget and President Marcelo Rebelo de Sousa warned that if there was no budget, he would dissolve Parliament and call a snap election. On 27 October 2021, Parliament rejected the budget by a 117 to 108 vote, and a snap general election was called for 30 January 2022.

2022 State Budget; António Costa (PS)
Ballot →	27 October 2021
Required majority →	Simple
Yes: • PS (108)	108 / 230
No: • PSD (79); • BE (19); • PCP (10); • CDS–PP (5); • PEV (2); • CH (1); • IL (1)	117 / 230
Abstentions: • PAN (3); • Ind. Joacine Katar Moreira (1); • Ind. Cristina Rodrigues (1)	5 / 230
Absentees	0 / 230
Result →	Rejected

== See also ==
- Elections in Portugal
- List of political parties in Portugal
- Politics of Portugal
