= Opinion polling for the 2019 Portuguese legislative election =

In the run up to the 2019 Portuguese legislative election (to be held on 6 October 2019), various organisations carry out opinion polling to gauge voting intention in Portugal. Results of such polls are displayed in this article.

The date range for these opinion polls are from the previous legislative election, held on 4 October 2015, to the present day.

== Nationwide polling ==
=== Graphical summary ===
Local Regression of polls conducted since the election

=== Polling ===
Poll results are listed in the table below in reverse chronological order, showing the most recent first. The highest percentage figure in each polling survey is displayed in bold, and the background shaded in the leading party's colour. In the instance that there is a tie, then no figure is shaded but both are displayed in bold. The lead column on the right shows the percentage-point difference between the two parties with the highest figures. Poll results use the date the survey's fieldwork was done, as opposed to the date of publication.

Exit poll

Polling firm/Link	Fieldwork date	Sample size	Turnout	PSD	CDS–PP	PS	BE	CDU	PAN	L	IL	A	CH	O	Lead
**2019 legislative election**	6 Oct 2019	—N/a	48.6	27.8; 79	4.2; 5	**36.3**; 108	9.5; 19	6.3; 12	3.3; 4	1.1; 1	1.3; 1	0.8; 0	1.3; 1	8.1	**8.5**
UCP–CESOP	6 Oct 2019	20,532	51–56	27–31; 74/82	3–5; 4/6	**34–39**; 104/112	9–12; 19/23	6–8; 9/14	3–5; 4/6	1–2; 1	1–2; 1/2	0–1; 0/1	1–2; 0/1	–	7–8
ICS/ISCTE	6 Oct 2019	15,051	48.5– 52.5	24.2– 28.2; 72/82	2.4– 5.0; 2/8	**36.0–** **40.0**; 105/117	8.9– 11.9; 17/24	4.7– 7.3; 5/13	2.5– 4.5; 2/6	0.5– 2.5; 1/2	0.6– 2.6; 1/3	–	0.4– 2.4; 0/1	–	11.8
Intercampus	6 Oct 2019	22,303	52–56	24–30; 75/85	2–5; 3/7	**33–39**; 102/114	7–11; 16/22	4–8; 8/14	2–5; 4/8	? 1	? 2	–	? 1	–	9
Pitagórica	6 Oct 2019	26,422	52.5– 56.6	24.6– 28.6; 68/78	2.9– 4.9; 3/7	**34.5–** **38.5**; 100/112	7.7– 11.7; 20/26	6.0– 8.0; 10/14	2.7– 4.7; 3/5	0.1– 2.1; 0/1	0.9– 2.9; 0/2	–	0.6– 2.6; 0/1	–	9.9
Pitagórica (Note: Tracking Poll.)	30 Sep–3 Oct 2019	600	?	27.8	4.6	**37.2**	9.2	6.6	4.8	0.9	0.9	1.1	1.8	5.3	9.4
Aximage	26 Sep–2 Oct 2019	2,171	?	26.8; 72	4.9; 9	**36.5**; 102	10.7; 25	6.6; 14	3.8; 6	1.3; 1	1.1; 0	–	1.3; 1	7.0; 0	9.7
Pitagórica	17 Sep–2 Oct 2019	2,400	?	28.8; 79/83	3.9; 7/10	**37.3**; 101/104	9.2; 17/20	6.6; 9/12	4.4; 4/5	0.9; 0/1	0.9; 0/1	1.5; 0	1.5; 0	5.0; 0	8.5
Pitagórica	28 Sep–1 Oct 2019	600	?	28.5	4.0	**37.4**	8.9	7.4	3.8	0.8	0.4	1.1	1.5	6.2	8.9
Intercampus	26 Sep–1 Oct 2019	1,000	?	26.1; 77	4.5; 7	**35.0**; 104	8.7; 17	8.0; 16	5.6; 9	–	–	–	–	12.1; 0	8.9
Eurosondagem	25 Sep–1 Oct 2019	2,071	?	25.5; 68/76	5.0; 6/8	**38.8**; 109/117	9.6; 17/19	7.1; 13/14	4.0; 5/6	–	–	–	–	10.0; 0/2	13.3
Pitagórica	27–30 Sep 2019	600	?	28.6	4.2	**35.6**	9.5	7.8	2.9	1.5	1.1	1.1	1.3	6.5	7.0
UCP–CESOP	26–29 Sep 2019	3,226	?	30; 79/87	5; 7/11	**37**; 97/107	10; 18/24	6; 8/13	3; 2/4	1; 0/1	1; 0/1	1; 0	1; 0	6; 0	7
Pitagórica	26–29 Sep 2019	600	?	28.9	4.5	**35.3**	9.1	7.8	3.2	1.5	1.3	0.6	1.1	6.7	6.4
ICS/ISCTE	23–29 Sep 2019	1,330	?	28; 73/83	5; 5/10	**38**; 104/114	10; 16/24	6; 9/15	3; 2/5	0.5; 0	0.2; 0	0.3; 0	0.4; 0	7; 0	10
Pitagórica	25–28 Sep 2019	600	?	27.7	4.4	**37.7**	10.0	6.3	3.1	1.3	1.1	0.7	1.1	6.8	10.0
Pitagórica	24–27 Sep 2019	600	?	26.4	3.6	**37.1**	10.4	6.4	3.1	1.3	2.0	0.7	1.1	7.8	10.7
Pitagórica	23–26 Sep 2019	600	?	26.6	4.0	**37.8**	10.1	5.1	3.6	1.1	1.6	0.7	1.1	8.3	11.2
Pitagórica	22–25 Sep 2019	600	?	26.8	4.4	**38.3**	10.6	5.3	3.3	1.1	1.3	0.7	0.7	7.5	11.5
Aximage	21–25 Sep 2019	?	?	25.2	5.1	**37.4**	11.0	6.8	3.6	1.6	1.2	–	1.5	6.6	12.2
Pitagórica	21–24 Sep 2019	600	?	27.0	4.4	**36.4**	10.6	6.9	3.0	1.2	1.8	0.5	0.7	7.6	9.4
Pitagórica	20–23 Sep 2019	600	?	28.5	4.4	**36.0**	10.5	6.8	3.7	0.9	1.2	0.5	0.5	7.0	7.5
Pitagórica	19–22 Sep 2019	600	?	27.7	4.7	**37.6**	10.4	7.6	3.3	0.5	0.9	0.7	0.2	6.3	9.9
Pitagórica	18–21 Sep 2019	600	?	26.8	5.5	**38.7**	9.7	6.9	3.1	0.2	1.0	1.0	0.5	6.7	11.9
Pitagórica	17–20 Sep 2019	600	?	26.6	5.2	**40.6**	8.8	6.8	3.6	0.2	0.5	1.1	0.5	6.1	14.0
Multidados	9–13 Sep 2019	800	?	25.1	5.2	**37.7**	12.5	5.9	5.0	–	–	–	–	9.0	12.6
Pitagórica	9–12 Sep 2019	605	?	23.3	5.6	**39.2**	10.0	7.7	3.2	0.9	–	1.5	–	8.6	15.9
Eurosondagem	7–12 Sep 2019	2,048	?	23.3; 64/70	5.5; 8	**38.3**; 112/118	9.5; 17/19	7.1; 13/15	4.5; 6	–	–	–	–	11.8; 1/3	15.0
Intercampus	2–11 Sep 2019	801	?	23.6; 67	6.3; 9	**37.9**; 114	9.8; 18	8.6; 16	5.2; 6	–	–	–	–	8.6; 0	14.3
Aximage	1–8 Sep 2019	985	65.5	20.6	4.6	**38.4**	10.2	5.4	4.9	–	–	–	–	15.9	17.8
Eurosondagem	1–5 Sep 2019	1,022	?	23.3	6.0	**38.1**	9.0	6.9	4.4	–	–	1.7	–	10.6	14.8
ICS/ISCTE	24 Aug–5 Sep 2019	801	?	23	5	**42**	9	6	4	0	0	0	0	11.0	19
Pitagórica	12–24 Aug 2019	1,525	?	20.4	4.9	**43.6**	10.0	6.6	3.2	0.6	1.3	1.5	–	7.9	23.2
Multidados	18–28 Jul 2019	800	?	20.3	3.3	**35.5**	14.7	5.6	7.9	–	–	–	–	12.7	15.2
Aximage	20–27 Jul 2019	1,385	61.7	20.7	5.0	**38.1**	10.0	6.7	5.0	–	–	–	–	14.5	17.4
Aximage	12–15 Jul 2019	601	?	23.6	4.9	**37.5**	9.4	6.8	4.0	–	–	–	–	13.8	13.9
Pitagórica	8–14 Jul 2019	800	?	21.6	6.0	**43.2**	9.2	6.8	3.6	–	–	1.2	0.8	7.6	21.6
Eurosondagem	7–11 Jul 2019	1,011	?	23.6	6.4	**37.3**	9.0	6.8	4.3	–	–	1.5	–	11.1	13.7
ICS/ISCTE	15–27 Jun 2019	801	?	23	5	**38**	11	8	4	0	0	0	1	10	15
Aximage	13–19 Jun 2019	605	64.1	23.1	6.6	**35.6**	9.0	7.0	4.2	–	–	0.8	–	13.7	12.5
Eurosondagem	2–6 Jun 2019	1,008	?	24.0	6.0	**37.1**	9.1	6.3	4.8	–	–	1.9	–	10.8	13.1
**2019 EP elections**	26 May 2019	—N/a	30.7	21.9 (67)	6.2 (9)	**33.4** (107)	9.8 (23)	6.9 (15)	5.1 (6)	1.8 (1)	0.9 (0)	1.9 (1)	1.5 (1)	10.6 (0)	**11.5**
UCP–CESOP	26 May 2019	4,589	?	25	6	**39**	9	8	4	–	–	1	–	8	14
Aximage	16–20 May 2019	622	63.7	25.7	6.9	**36.5**	9.1	7.3	1.5	–	–	1.3	–	11.7	10.8
UCP–CESOP	16–19 May 2019	1,882	?	28	7	**39**	9	8	3	–	–	1	–	5	11
Pitagórica	10–19 May 2019	605	?	22.5	6.1	**40.4**	8.2	6.5	3.6	–	–	1.5	–	11.1	17.9
Aximage	3–8 May 2019	601	63.3	27.6	7.4	**35.4**	7.9	7.2	1.6	–	–	1.4	–	11.5	7.8
Pitagórica	3–13 Apr 2019	605	?	25.6	6.5	**37.2**	8.3	6.5	2.8	–	–	1.8	–	11.4	11.6
Eurosondagem	7–11 Apr 2019	1,019	?	25.0	8.4	**36.9**	7.8	7.3	2.5	–	–	3.5	(Note: Did not exist.)	8.6	11.9
Aximage	30 Mar–1 Apr 2019	602	63.6	27.3	8.5	**34.6**	8.5	7.0	2.2	–	–	1.6	(Note: Did not exist.)	10.3	7.3
Eurosondagem	10–14 Mar 2019	1,020	?	25.2	8.5	**37.3**	8.1	7.1	2.4	–	–	3.3	(Note: Did not exist.)	8.1	12.1
Aximage	9–13 Mar 2019	600	?	23.9	9.7	**36.3**	9.2	6.8	2.2	–	–	1.8	(Note: Did not exist.)	10.1	12.4
ICS/ISCTE	9–21 Feb 2019	801	?	25	8	**37**	8	8	3	1	0	2	(Note: Did not exist.)	8	12
Aximage	5–10 Feb 2019	602	66.3	24.4	9.3	**36.4**	8.9	6.3	2.5	–	–	1.6	(Note: Did not exist.)	10.6	12.0
Eurosondagem	2–9 Jan 2019	1,010	?	24.8	7.1	**40.0**	7.6	7.1	1.9	–	–	4.0	(Note: Did not exist.)	7.5	15.2
Aximage	4–7 Jan 2019	608	65.4	24.1	9.4	**37.7**	8.8	7.2	3.5	–	–	1.2	(Note: Did not exist.)	8.1	13.6
Aximage	7–11 Dec 2018	602	66.6	24.7	8.7	**37.0**	10.0	6.3	–	–	–	–	(Note: Did not exist.)	13.3	12.3
Eurosondagem	7–14 Nov 2018	1,018	?	26.8	7.0	**41.8**	7.7	7.0	1.8	–	–	–	(Note: Did not exist.)	7.9	15.0
Aximage	9–12 Nov 2018	603	67.0	26.4	7.7	**37.8**	9.1	6.2	–	–	–	–	(Note: Did not exist.)	12.8	11.4
Aximage	1–3 Oct 2018	601	67.0	24.0	9.2	**38.9**	9.1	7.4	–	–	–		(Note: Did not exist.)	11.4	14.9
Eurosondagem	5–12 Sep 2018	1,008	?	27.5	7.7	**41.4**	8.0	6.9	1.1	–	–		(Note: Did not exist.)	7.4	13.9
Aximage	1–2 Sep 2018	603	66.5	24.1	9.2	**39.9**	7.8	7.1	–	–	–		(Note: Did not exist.)	11.9	15.8
Aximage	13–16 Jul 2018	600	64.6	27.2	7.4	**39.0**	9.5	7.0	–	–	–		(Note: Did not exist.)	9.9	11.8
Eurosondagem	4–11 Jul 2018	1,011	?	27.3	7.5	**42.0**	7.9	7.3	1.1	–	–		(Note: Did not exist.)	6.9	14.7
Aximage	9–12 Jun 2018	602	67.2	27.8	6.3	**37.0**	10.3	7.2	–	–	–		(Note: Did not exist.)	11.4	9.2
Aximage	5–9 May 2018	600	67.2	27.6	6.7	**37.7**	10.0	7.7	–	–	–		(Note: Did not exist.)	10.3	10.1
Eurosondagem	3–9 May 2018	1,008	?	28.0	7.0	**41.0**	8.0	7.5	1.4	–	–		(Note: Did not exist.)	7.1	13.0
Aximage	8–12 Apr 2018	601	68.7	26.7	7.0	**38.0**	10.0	7.7	–	–	–		(Note: Did not exist.)	10.6	11.3
Eurosondagem	8–14 Mar 2018	1,010	?	28.4	6.6	**41.5**	7.7	7.3	1.5	–	–		(Note: Did not exist.)	7.0	13.1
Aximage	2–5 Mar 2018	605	67.3	27.0	5.4	**39.2**	10.0	7.4	–	–	–		(Note: Did not exist.)	11.0	12.2
Aximage	3–6 Feb 2018	603	66.4	26.4	6.2	**40.6**	8.8	7.7	–	–	–		(Note: Did not exist.)	10.3	14.2
Eurosondagem	14–17 Jan 2018	1,018	?	26.9	7.0	**41.3**	8.5	6.9	1.8	–	–		(Note: Did not exist.)	7.6	14.4
Aximage	6–9 Jan 2018	600	65.8	26.2	6.2	**40.2**	9.2	6.8	–	–	–		(Note: Did not exist.)	11.4	14.0
Eurosondagem	6–12 Dec 2017	1,017	?	27.9	6.9	**40.2**	8.6	7.0	1.7	–			(Note: Did not exist.)	7.7	12.3
Aximage	1–4 Dec 2017	603	67.4	26.1	6.5	**39.9**	9.3	7.5	–	–			(Note: Did not exist.)	10.7	13.8
Eurosondagem	8–15 Nov 2017	1,010	?	28.4	6.6	**40.0**	8.7	6.9	1.7	–			(Note: Did not exist.)	7.7	11.6
Aximage	4–6 Nov 2017	600	67.4	25.5	6.7	**39.1**	8.7	8.6	–	–			(Note: Did not exist.)	11.4	13.6
Aximage	14–17 Oct 2017	603	64.5	23.8	5.9	**41.9**	9.0	7.7	–	–			(Note: Did not exist.)	11.7	18.1
Eurosondagem	4–11 Oct 2017	1,011	?	28.0	6.0	**41.0**	9.0	7.5	1.4	–			(Note: Did not exist.)	7.1	13.0
**2017 local elections**	1 Oct 2017	—N/a	55.0	30.3 (83)	4.1 (6)	**38.7** (112)	3.3 (5)	9.5 (22)	1.1 (1)	0.3 (0)			(Note: Did not exist.)	12.7 (1)	**8.4**
Aximage	26–28 Sep 2017	600	65.3	25.8	4.1	**43.7**	7.8	7.8	–	–			(Note: Did not exist.)	10.8	17.9
Eurosondagem	31 Aug–6 Sep 2017	1,007	?	28.7	6.8	**40.3**	8.4	7.3	1.5	–			(Note: Did not exist.)	7.0	11.6
Aximage	29–30 Aug 2017	597	65.0	22.9	5.2	**43.0**	9.1	7.8	–	–			(Note: Did not exist.)	12.0	20.1
Eurosondagem	27 Jul–2 Aug 2017	1,011	?	28.1	6.9	**40.8**	8.4	7.6	1.1	–			(Note: Did not exist.)	7.1	12.7
Aximage	6–11 Jul 2017	604	66.4	22.9	5.3	**44.0**	10.1	7.8	–	–			(Note: Did not exist.)	9.9	21.1
Eurosondagem	28 Jun–5 Jul 2017	1,008	?	28.6	6.2	**40.4**	8.5	7.8	1.3	–			(Note: Did not exist.)	7.2	11.8
Aximage	7–11 Jun 2017	601	66.4	24.6	4.6	**43.7**	9.7	7.8	–	–			(Note: Did not exist.)	9.6	19.1
Eurosondagem	1–7 Jun 2017	1,010	?	29.0	6.4	**40.0**	8.6	7.5	1.7	–			(Note: Did not exist.)	6.8	11.0
Eurosondagem	3–10 May 2017	1,005	?	29.0	6.9	**39.0**	9.0	7.6	1.2	–			(Note: Did not exist.)	7.3	10.0
Aximage	5–8 May 2017	603	64.7	24.5	5.4	**42.4**	10.0	7.7	–	–			(Note: Did not exist.)	10.0	17.9
Eurosondagem	30 Mar–5 Apr 2017	1,003	?	29.3	6.4	**39.3**	9.0	7.5	1.4	–			(Note: Did not exist.)	7.1	10.0
Aximage	2–4 Apr 2017	600	?	24.6	4.8	**42.0**	9.5	7.6	–	–			(Note: Did not exist.)	11.5	17.4
Eurosondagem	1–8 Mar 2017	1,011	?	28.8	7.2	**38.3**	9.2	8.0	1.8	–			(Note: Did not exist.)	6.7	9.5
Aximage	4–6 Mar 2017	608	65.5	26.0	5.3	**41.7**	9.2	6.8	–	–			(Note: Did not exist.)	11.0	15.7
Aximage	5–8 Feb 2017	601	65.4	26.4	5.0	**42.0**	8.4	7.9	–	–			(Note: Did not exist.)	10.3	15.6
Eurosondagem	1–8 Feb 2017	1,017	?	29.2	7.0	**37.8**	9.2	8.3	1.1	–			(Note: Did not exist.)	7.4	8.6
Eurosondagem	5–11 Jan 2017	1,010	?	30.0	6.9	**37.3**	9.5	7.8	1.6	–			(Note: Did not exist.)	6.9	7.3
Aximage	6–9 Jan 2017	603	66.5	25.1	6.8	**41.7**	9.1	6.9	–	–			(Note: Did not exist.)	10.4	16.6
Eurosondagem	7–14 Dec 2016	1,016	?	30.0	6.8	**38.0**	9.1	7.7	1.6	–			(Note: Did not exist.)	6.8	8.0
Aximage	2–4 Dec 2016	605	64.3	27.4	6.7	**40.1**	8.3	7.5	–	–			(Note: Did not exist.)	10.0	12.7
UCP–CESOP	19–22 Nov 2016	977	?	30	6	**43**	8	6	2	–			(Note: Did not exist.)	5	13
Eurosondagem	2–9 Nov 2016	1,011	?	30.4	6.6	**37.0**	9.7	8.2	1.1	–			(Note: Did not exist.)	7.0	6.6
Aximage	31 Oct–1 Nov 2016	601	63.4	28.7	6.4	**38.3**	9.0	7.3	–	–			(Note: Did not exist.)	10.3	9.6
Eurosondagem	6–12 Oct 2016	1,010	?	30.7	7.0	**36.3**	9.5	8.3	1.3	–			(Note: Did not exist.)	6.9	5.6
Aximage	1–3 Oct 2016	608	?	30.6	6.1	**37.7**	8.7	7.5	–	–			(Note: Did not exist.)	9.4	7.1
Eurosondagem	7–14 Sep 2016	1,009	?	32.1	6.9	**36.0**	8.9	8.1	1.4	–			(Note: Did not exist.)	6.5	3.9
Aximage	2–5 Sep 2016	603	65.3	30.1	4.6	**39.8**	10.6	6.6	–	–			(Note: Did not exist.)	8.3	9.7
Eurosondagem	26 Jul–2 Aug 2016	1,005	?	32.5	6.0	**35.5**	9.7	7.8	1.4	–			(Note: Did not exist.)	7.1	3.0
Aximage	15–17 Jul 2016	606	65.0	30.5	4.9	**39.0**	10.0	6.8	–	–			(Note: Did not exist.)	8.8	8.5
Eurosondagem	30 Jun–6 Jul 2016	1,023	?	32.5	6.5	**35.0**	9.5	8.0	1.6	–			(Note: Did not exist.)	6.9	2.5
Eurosondagem	1–7 Jun 2016	1,025	?	31.9	6.8	**35.3**	9.9	8.1	1.5	–			(Note: Did not exist.)	6.5	3.4
Aximage	30 May–1 Jun 2016	603	65.5	32.1	4.2	**38.5**	10.2	6.7	–	–			(Note: Did not exist.)	8.3	6.4
Eurosondagem	5–11 May 2016	1,031	?	31.7	7.0	**34.8**	9.6	8.4	1.7	–			(Note: Did not exist.)	6.8	3.1
Aximage	7–9 May 2016	600	63.7	32.3	4.0	**38.5**	9.7	6.6	–	–			(Note: Did not exist.)	8.9	6.2
Eurosondagem	7–13 Apr 2016	1,026	?	32.0	7.7	**34.3**	9.7	8.3	1.3	–			(Note: Did not exist.)	6.7	2.3
Aximage	2–3 Apr 2016	601	63.9	33.5	4.2	**35.6**	10.0	6.2	–	–			(Note: Did not exist.)	10.5	2.1
Eurosondagem	3–9 Mar 2016	1,005	?	32.0	8.0	**35.0**	9.2	7.8	1.4	–			(Note: Did not exist.)	6.6	3.0
Aximage	1–4 Mar 2016	609	64.4	**36.1**	2.2	33.8	11.3	6.6	–	–			(Note: Did not exist.)	10.0	2.3
Eurosondagem	4–10 Feb 2016	1,010	?	32.5	7.5	**33.6**	10.0	8.4	1.2	–			(Note: Did not exist.)	6.8	1.1
Aximage	30–31 Jan 2016	606	67.0	**36.1**	2.7	34.8	10.9	6.6	–	–			(Note: Did not exist.)	8.9	1.3
Aximage	16–20 Jan 2016	1,301	65.4	**35.7**	3.3	35.3	10.0	6.8	–	–			(Note: Did not exist.)	8.9	0.4
Eurosondagem	1–6 Jan 2016	1,016	?	32.1	8.5	**33.3**	10.1	7.5	1.5	–			(Note: Did not exist.)	7.0	1.2
Aximage	2–5 Jan 2016	602	64.1	**36.2**	3.6	35.5	9.8	5.6	–	–			(Note: Did not exist.)	9.3	0.7
Eurosondagem	3–9 Dec 2015	1,015	?	33.0	8.0	**33.7**	9.5	7.8	1.3	–			(Note: Did not exist.)	6.7	0.7
UCP–CESOP	5–6 Dec 2015	1,183	64	**41**		34	11	7	2	–			(Note: Did not exist.)	5	7
Aximage	28 Nov–2 Dec 2015	605	64.8	**35.3**	4.1	34.0	12.1	7.4	–	–			(Note: Did not exist.)	7.1	1.3
Aximage	31 Oct–4 Nov 2015	603	63.3	**40.1**		32.9	10.5	8.0	2.0	–			(Note: Did not exist.)	6.5	7.2
Eurosondagem	29 Oct–3 Nov 2015	1,036	?	**40.8**		32.5	10.0	8.0	1.5	–			(Note: Did not exist.)	7.2	8.3
Intercampus	14–17 Oct 2015	807	?	**41.3**		32.7	11.0	7.7	–	–			(Note: Did not exist.)	7.3	8.6
**2015 legislative election**	4 Oct 2015	—N/a	55.8	**38.6** (Note: The Social Democratic Party (PSD) and the People's Party (CDS–PP) contested the 2015 election in a coalition called Portugal Ahead (PàF). PSD elected 89 MPs, while CDS–PP elected 18 MPs.); 107		32.3; 86	10.2; 19	8.3; 17	1.4; 1	0.7; 0			(Note: Did not exist.)	9.5; 0	**6.3**

== Constituency polling ==
=== Lisbon ===
Polling firm/Link	Fieldwork date	Sample size	Turnout	PSD	CDS–PP	PS	BE	CDU	PAN	L	IL	A	CH	O	Lead
2019 legislative election	6 Oct 2019	—N/a	57.3	22.6; 12	4.4; 2	36.7; 20	9.7; 5	7.8; 4	4.4; 2	2.1; 1	2.5; 1	1.3; 0	2.0; 1	6.5; 0	14.1
Eurosondagem	28 Sep–1 Oct 2019	710	?	20.5; 11	5.2; 2/3	40.8; 22/23	9.8; 5	7.7; 4	4.0; 2	1.2; 0	1.7; 0/1	1.7; 0/1	1.9; 1	5.5; 1	20.3
Eurosondagem	18–19 Sep 2019	719	?	19.1; 10	6.6; 3	40.0; 22	10.1; 5	7.7; 4	4.5; 2	–	–	–	2.2; 1	9.8; 1	20.9
2015 legislative election	4 Oct 2015	—N/a	60.3	34.7; 18		33.5; 18	10.9; 5	9.8; 5	2.0; 1	1.3; 0				9.1; 0	1.2

=== Madeira ===
Polling firm/Link	Fieldwork date	Sample size	Turnout	PSD	PS	BE		CDS–PP	CDU	PAN	O	Lead
2019 legislative election	6 Oct 2019	—N/a	50.3	37.2; 3	33.4; 3	5.2; 0	5.5; 0	6.1; 0	2.1; 0	1.8; 0	8.8; 0	3.8
UCP–CESOP	14–15 Sep 2019	1,375	?	41	31	8	5	5	4	2	5	10
2015 legislative election	4 Oct 2015	—N/a	48.9	37.8; 3	20.9; 2	10.7; 1	6.9; 0	6.0; 0	3.6; 0	1.8; 0	12.4; 0	16.9

=== Porto ===
Polling firm/Link	Fieldwork date	Sample size	Turnout	PSD	CDS–PP	PS	BE	CDU	PAN	O	Lead
2019 legislative election	6 Oct 2019	—N/a	58.6	31.2; 15	3.3; 1	36.7; 17	10.1; 4	4.8; 2	3.5; 1	10.5; 0	5.5
Eurosondagem	29 Sep–1 Oct 2019	771	?	26.9; 12/13	4.8; 2	40.0; 17/18	10.0; 4	5.0; 2	4.4; 2	8.9; 0	13.1
Eurosondagem	2–4 Jul 2019	1,005	?	25.0; 11/12	5.5; 2	38.7; 17/18	8.9; 4	5.4; 2	5.0; 2	11.5; 0	13.7
2015 legislative election	4 Oct 2015	—N/a	60.3	39.6; 17		32.7; 14	11.1; 5	6.8; 3	1.6; 0	8.2; 0	6.9

== Leadership polls ==
=== Preferred prime minister ===
Poll results showing public opinion on who would make the best prime minister are shown in the table below in reverse chronological order, showing the most recent first.

==== António Costa vs Rui Rio ====
Polling firm/Link	Fieldwork date	António Costa	Rui Rio	N	Both/ O	NO	Lead
Aximage	1–8 Sep 2019	48.0	19.5	–	–	–	28.5
Aximage	12–15 Jul 2019	55.3	27.2	–	–	–	28.1
Aximage	13–19 Jun 2019	54.0	25.7	–	–	–	28.3
Aximage	3–8 May 2019	52.8	29.5	–	–	–	23.3
Aximage	30 Mar–1 Apr 2019	51.0	30.5	–	–	–	20.5
Aximage	9–13 Mar 2019	53.8	27.7	–	–	–	26.1
Aximage	5–10 Feb 2019	52.7	31.4	–	–	–	21.3
Aximage	4–7 Jan 2019	55.4	26.9	–	–	–	28.5
Aximage	7–11 Dec 2018	55.3	28.1	15.3	0.6	0.7	27.2
Aximage	9–12 Nov 2018	53.5	30.3	–	–	–	23.2
Aximage	1–3 Oct 2018	55.3	30.1	–	–	–	25.2
Aximage	1–2 Sep 2018	57.6	28.0	–	–	–	29.6
Aximage	13–16 Jul 2018	57.0	30.1	–	–	–	26.9
Aximage	9–12 Jun 2018	57.3	31.2	–	–	–	26.1
Aximage	5–9 May 2018	59.8	29.0	–	–	–	30.8
Aximage	8–12 Apr 2018	61.8	26.4	–	–	–	35.4
Aximage	2–5 Mar 2018	62.9	27.8	–	–	–	35.1
Aximage	3–6 Feb 2018	64.1	22.0	–	–	–	42.1
Eurosondagem	8–10 Jan 2018	51.3	25.1	–	–	23.6	26.2
Aximage	6–9 Jan 2018	55.7	33.0	8.1	1.2	2.0	22.7
Eurosondagem	4–6 Dec 2017	51.9	26.9	–	–	21.2	25.0
Aximage	1–4 Dec 2017	60.1	32.8	4.1	0.6	2.4	27.3
Eurosondagem	6–8 Nov 2017	52.0	25.0	–	–	23.0	27.0
Aximage	4–6 Nov 2017	56.2	34.1	6.4	0.7	2.6	22.1
Aximage	31 Oct–1 Nov 2016	48.1	43.0	2.6	1.3	5.0	5.1

==== António Costa vs Passos Coelho ====
Polling firm/Link	Fieldwork date	António Costa	Pedro Passos Coelho	N	Both/ O	NO	Lead
Aximage	14–17 Oct 2017	67.6	20.8	10.1	0.4	1.1	46.8
Aximage	26–28 Sep 2017	64.0	24.4	–	–	–	39.6
Aximage	29–30 Aug 2017	65.8	23.4	9.2	0.9	0.9	42.4
Aximage	6–11 Jul 2017	66.3	23.2	–	–	–	43.1
Aximage	7–11 Jun 2017	69.1	22.2	6.8	0.7	1.2	46.9
Aximage	5–8 May 2017	66.2	23.3	8.4	0.7	1.4	42.9
Aximage	2–4 Apr 2017	67.5	24.1	–	–	–	43.4
Aximage	4–6 Mar 2017	63.6	26.2	8.8	0.6	0.8	37.4
Aximage	5–8 Feb 2017	66.1	25.0	7.5	0.7	0.7	41.1
Aximage	6–9 Jan 2017	64.3	23.7	–	–	–	40.6
Aximage	2–4 Dec 2016	61.6	26.5	10.5	0.6	0.8	35.1
Aximage	31 Oct–1 Nov 2016	55.4	30.8	0.4	12.5	0.9	24.6
Aximage	1–3 Oct 2016	54.0	32.8	0.4	12.1	0.7	21.2
Aximage	2–5 Sep 2016	57.3	31.2	0.4	10.3	0.8	26.1
Aximage	15–17 Jul 2016	56.8	31.6	0.8	9.5	1.3	25.2
Aximage	30 May–1 Jun 2016	55.2	35.2	7.4	1.4	0.8	20.0
Aximage	7–9 May 2016	54.5	36.1	4.9	3.5	1.0	18.4
Aximage	2–3 Apr 2016	50.8	38.8	8.4	0.5	1.5	12.0
Aximage	1–4 Mar 2016	47.8	41.6	8.4	0.5	1.7	6.2
Aximage	30–31 Jan 2016	48.1	41.9	7.6	0.7	1.7	6.2
Aximage	2–5 Jan 2016	48.3	38.9	9.5	1.1	2.2	9.4
Aximage	28 Nov–2 Dec 2015	43.2	44.3	10.5	0.6	1.4	1.1
Aximage	31 Oct–4 Nov 2015	39.6	45.5	13.7	0.2	1.0	5.9

==== António Costa vs Santana Lopes ====
Polling firm/Link	Fieldwork date	António Costa	Pedro Santana Lopes	N	Both/ O	NO	Lead
Eurosondagem	8–10 Jan 2018	51.7	29.6	–	–	23.6	22.1
Aximage	6–9 Jan 2018	71.0	19.0	8.5	0.1	1.4	52.0
Eurosondagem	4–6 Dec 2017	52.7	30.2	–	–	17.1	22.5
Aximage	1–4 Dec 2017	71.7	19.7	6.6	0.0	2.0	52.0
Eurosondagem	6–8 Nov 2017	52.5	27.5	–	–	20.0	25.0
Aximage	4–6 Nov 2017	68.4	21.9	7.0	0.0	2.7	46.5

=== Cabinet approval/disapproval ratings ===
==== Graphical summary ====
View source data.

==== Polling ====
Poll results showing public opinion on the performance of the Government are shown in the table below in reverse chronological order, showing the most recent first.

Polling firm/Link	Fieldwork date	Sample size	António Costa's cabinet				
Polling firm/Link	Fieldwork date	Sample size	Approve	Disapprove	Neither	No opinion	Lead
Intercampus	2–11 Sep 2019	801	43.3	23.3	27.5	5.9	15.8
Eurosondagem	1–5 Sep 2019	1,022	42.4	26.5	—N/a	31.1	15.9
ICS/ISCTE	24 Aug–5 Sep 2019	801	50	37	—N/a	13	13
Pitagórica	12–24 Aug 2019	1,525	30	28	42	—N/a	12
Pitagórica	8–14 Jul 2019	800	31	23	46	—N/a	15
Eurosondagem	7–11 Jul 2019	1,011	42.8	26.6	—N/a	30.6	16.2
ICS/ISCTE	15–27 Jun 2019	801	50	39	—N/a	11	11
Eurosondagem	2–6 Jun 2019	1,008	41.6	26.9	—N/a	31.5	14.7
Pitagórica	10–19 May 2019	605	31	25	44	—N/a	13
ICS/ISCTE	7–12 May 2019	803	53	37	—N/a	10	16
ICS/ISCTE	22 Apr–3 May 2019	802	53	36	—N/a	11	17
Pitagórica	3–13 Apr 2019	605	28	27	45	—N/a	17
Eurosondagem	7–11 Apr 2019	1,019	40.2	28.7	—N/a	31.1	11.5
Eurosondagem	10–14 Mar 2019	1,020	41.2	28.7	—N/a	30.1	12.5
ICS/ISCTE	9–21 Feb 2019	801	54	34	—N/a	12	20
Eurosondagem	2–9 Jan 2019	1,010	29.7	30.7	28.7	10.9	1.0
Eurosondagem	7–14 Nov 2018	1,018	29.5	29.8	29.2	11.5	0.3
Eurosondagem	5–12 Sep 2018	1,008	30.1	29.8	29.2	10.9	0.3
Eurosondagem	4–11 Jul 2018	1,011	30.7	28.9	28.5	11.9	1.8
Eurosondagem	3–9 May 2018	1,008	31.8	30.1	25.7	12.4	1.7
Eurosondagem	8–14 Mar 2018	1,010	33.0	29.7	25.3	12.0	3.3
Eurosondagem	14–17 Jan 2018	1,018	32.7	32.4	23.0	11.9	0.3
Eurosondagem	6–12 Dec 2017	1,017	32.7	33.2	23.1	11.0	0.5
Eurosondagem	8–15 Nov 2017	1,010	33.0	32.8	22.7	11.5	0.2
Eurosondagem	4–10 Oct 2017	1,011	32.1	29.7	26.2	12.0	2.4
Eurosondagem	31 Aug–6 Sep 2017	1,007	31.9	29.8	25.9	12.4	2.1
Eurosondagem	27 Jul–2 Aug 2017	1,011	29.7	22.3	33.4	14.6	3.7
Eurosondagem	28 Jun–5 Jul 2017	1,008	30.0	21.8	33.5	14.7	3.5
Eurosondagem	1–7 Jun 2017	1,010	30.7	20.8	34.9	13.6	4.2
Eurosondagem	3–10 May 2017	1,005	29.9	20.9	36.0	13.2	6.1
Eurosondagem	30 Mar–5 Apr 2017	1,003	28.3	16.6	41.4	13.7	13.1
Eurosondagem	1–8 Mar 2017	1,011	27.7	17.8	40.9	13.6	13.2
Eurosondagem	1–8 Feb 2017	1,017	27.5	19.3	39.8	13.4	12.3
Eurosondagem	5–11 Jan 2017	1,010	27.7	18.8	39.8	13.7	12.1
Eurosondagem	7–14 Dec 2016	1,016	29.5	18.5	37.4	14.6	7.9
CESOP–UCP	19–22 Nov 2016	977	63	25	—N/a	15	38
Eurosondagem	2–9 Nov 2016	1,011	29.7	18.0	38.4	13.9	8.7
Eurosondagem	6–12 Oct 2016	1,010	30.0	21.8	34.7	13.5	4.7
Eurosondagem	7–14 Sep 2016	1,009	30.6	22.3	34.1	13.0	3.5
Eurosondagem	26 Jul–2 Aug 2016	1,005	31.1	22.1	34.7	12.1	3.6
Eurosondagem	30 Jun–6 Jul 2016	1,023	30.3	21.5	36.4	11.8	6.1
Eurosondagem	1–7 Jun 2016	1,025	30.0	20.5	37.4	12.1	7.4
Eurosondagem	5–11 May 2016	1,031	33.8	20.4	33.6	12.2	0.2
Eurosondagem	7–13 Apr 2016	1,026	33.9	21.4	32.8	11.9	1.1
Eurosondagem	3–9 Mar 2016	1,005	33.1	20.9	34.9	11.1	1.8
Eurosondagem	4–10 Feb 2016	1,010	33.4	22.0	33.8	10.8	0.4
Eurosondagem	1–6 Jan 2016	1,016	33.2	22.1	32.8	11.9	0.4

Polling firm/Link	Fieldwork date	Sample size	Pedro Passos Coelho's cabinet				
Polling firm/Link	Fieldwork date	Sample size	Approve	Disapprove	Neither	No opinion	Lead
Eurosondagem	29 Oct–3 Nov 2015	1,036	16.3	42.1	31.9	9.7	10.2
