= Results breakdown of the 2019 Portuguese legislative election =

2019 Portuguese legislative election
- 6 October 2019
- All 230 seats in the Assembly of the Republic; 116 seats needed for a majority
- Turnout: 48.6%
Party	Leader	Vote %	Seats	+/–
PS	António Costa	36.3%	108	+22
PSD	Rui Rio	27.8%	79	−10
BE	Catarina Martins	9.5%	19	0
CDU	Jerónimo de Sousa	6.3%	12	−5
CDS–PP	Assunção Cristas	4.2%	5	−13
PAN	André Lourenço e Silva	3.3%	4	+3
CH	André Ventura	1.3%	1	+1
IL	Carlos Guimarães Pinto	1.3%	1	+1
LIVRE	Collective leadership (Note: Joacine Katar Moreira, running for Lisbon, was the party's main candidate in this campaign.)	1.1%	1	+1
This lists parties that won seats. See the complete results below.
Prime Minister before	Prime Minister after
António Costa; PS	António Costa; PS

This is the results breakdown of the Assembly of the Republic election held in Portugal on 6 October 2019. The following tables show detailed results in each of the country's 22 electoral constituencies.

== Electoral system ==
The Assembly of the Republic has 230 members elected to four-year terms. The number of seats to be elected by each district depends on the district magnitude. 226 seats are allocated proportionally by the number of registered voters in the 18 Districts in Mainland Portugal, plus Azores and Madeira, and 4 fixed seats are allocated for overseas voters, 2 seats for voters in Europe and another 2 seats for voters Outside Europe. The 230 members of Parliament are elected using the D'Hondt method and by a closed list proportional representation system. Members represent the country as a whole and not the constituencies in which they were elected.

== Summary ==
=== Nationwide results ===
Summary of the 6 October 2019 Assembly of the Republic elections results
Parties	Votes	%	±pp swing	MPs				
Parties	Votes	%	±pp swing	2015	2019	±	%	±
Socialist	1,903,687	36.35	▲4.0	86	108	▲22	46.96	▲9.6
Social Democratic	1,454,283	27.77	(Note: The Social Democratic Party (PSD) and the People's Party (CDS–PP) contested the 2015 election in a coalition called Portugal Ahead (PàF) and won a combined 38.6% of the vote and elected 107 MPs to parliament.)	89	79	▼10	34.35	▼4.3
Left Bloc	498,549	9.52	▼0.7	19	19	0	8.26	0.0
Unitary Democratic Coalition	332,018	6.34	▼1.9	17	12	▼5	5.22	▼2.2
People's	221,094	4.22		18	5	▼13	2.17	▼5.6
People–Animals–Nature	173,931	3.32	▲1.9	1	4	▲3	1.74	▲1.3
Chega	67,502	1.29	—N/a	—N/a	1	—N/a	0.43	—N/a
Liberal Initiative	67,443	1.29	—N/a	—N/a	1	—N/a	0.43	—N/a
LIVRE	56,940	1.09	▲0.4	0	1	▲1	0.43	▲0.4
Alliance	40,175	0.77	—N/a	—N/a	0	—N/a	0.00	—N/a
Portuguese Workers' Communist	36,006	0.69	▼0.4	0	0	0	0.00	0.0
React, Include, Recycle	35,169	0.67	—N/a	—N/a	0	—N/a	0.00	—N/a
National Renovator	16,992	0.32	▼0.2	0	0	0	0.00	0.0
Earth	12,888	0.25	▼0.2	0	0	0	0.00	0.0
We, the Citizens!	12,346	0.24	▼0.2	0	0	0	0.00	0.0
Democratic Republican	11,674	0.22	▼0.9	0	0	0	0.00	0.0
United Party of Retirees and Pensioners	11,457	0.22	▼0.1	0	0	0	0.00	0.0
Together for the People	10,552	0.20	▼0.1	0	0	0	0.00	0.0
People's Monarchist	8,389	0.16	▼0.1	0	0	0	0.00	0.0
Labour	8,271	0.16	(Note: The Socialist Alternative Movement (MAS) and the Portuguese Labour Party (PTP) contested the 2015 election in a coalition called AGIR! (Act!) and won a combined 0.4% of the vote.)	0	0	0	0.00	0.0
Socialist Alternative Movement	3,243	0.06		0	0	0	0.00	0.0
Total valid	4,982,609	95.14	▼1.1	230	230	0	100.00	0
Blank ballots	131,302	2.51	▲0.4					
Invalid ballots	123,573	2.36	▲0.7					
Total	5,237,484	100.00						
Registered voters/turnout	10,777,258	48.60	▼7.3					
Source: Comissão Nacional de Eleições

== Results by constituency ==
=== Azores ===
Summary of the 6 October 2019 Assembly of the Republic elections results in Azores
Parties	Votes	%	±pp swing	MPs		
Parties	Votes	%	±pp swing	2015	2019	±
Socialist	33,472	40.06	▼0.3	3	3	0
Social Democratic	25,249	30.21	▼5.8	2	2	0
Left Bloc	6,661	7.97	▲3.2	0	0	0
People's	4,041	4.80	▲0.9	0	0	0
People–Animals–Nature	2,215	2.65	▲1.8	0	0	0
Unitary Democratic Coalition	2,045	2.45	▼0.0	0	0	0
Alliance	732	0.88	—N/a	—N/a	0	—N/a
LIVRE	714	0.85	▲0.5	0	0	0
Chega	709	0.85	—N/a	—N/a	0	—N/a
Liberal Initiative	568	0.68	—N/a	—N/a	0	—N/a
Portuguese Workers' Communist	528	0.63	▼0.0	0	0	0
People's Monarchist	418	0.50	—N/a	—N/a	0	—N/a
Earth	326	0.39	▲0.1	0	0	0
National Renovator	268	0.32	▲0.1	0	0	0
Labour	145	0.17	—N/a	—N/a	0	—N/a
Socialist Alternative Movement	112	0.13	—N/a	—N/a	0	—N/a
Democratic Republican	100	0.12	▼0.4	0	0	0
Total valid	78,276	93.67	▼1.4	5	5	0
Blank ballots	3,926	4.70	▲1.4			
Invalid ballots	1,363	1.63	▼0.0			
Total	83,565	100.00				
Registered voters/turnout	228,954	36.50	▼4.7			
Source: Resultados Açores

=== Aveiro ===
Summary of the 6 October 2019 Assembly of the Republic elections results in Aveiro
Parties	Votes	%	±pp swing	MPs		
Parties	Votes	%	±pp swing	2015	2019	±
Socialist	120,839	34.31	▲6.4	5	7	▲2
Social Democratic	118,141	33.55	(Note: The Social Democratic Party (PSD) and the People's Party (CDS–PP) contested the 2015 election in a coalition called Portugal Ahead (PàF) and won a combined 48.14% of the vote in Aveiro district, electing a total of 10 seats, 8 PSD and 2 CDS–PP.)	8	6	▼2
Left Bloc	35,068	9.96	▲0.4	1	2	▲1
People's	20,045	5.69		2	1	▼1
Unitary Democratic Coalition	10,738	3.05	▼1.3	0	0	0
People–Animals–Nature	10,424	2.96	▲2.0	0	0	0
Liberal Initiative	3,582	1.02	—N/a	—N/a	0	—N/a
React, Include, Recycle	2,750	0.78	—N/a	—N/a	0	—N/a
Chega	2,600	0.74	—N/a	—N/a	0	—N/a
LIVRE	2,409	0.68	▲0.2	0	0	0
Alliance	2,178	0.62	—N/a	—N/a	0	—N/a
Portuguese Workers' Communist	1,892	0.54	▼0.4	0	0	0
Earth	707	0.20	▼0.2	0	0	0
United Party of Retirees and Pensioners	701	0.20	▲0.0	0	0	0
National Renovator	694	0.20	▼0.3	0	0	0
We, the Citizens!	623	0.18	▼0.1	0	0	0
Democratic Republican	561	0.16	▼1.1	0	0	0
Labour	559	0.16	—N/a	—N/a	0	—N/a
People's Monarchist	387	0.11	▼0.2	0	0	0
Together for the People	264	0.07	▼0.0	0	0	0
Total valid	335,162	95.17	▼0.6	16	16	0
Blank ballots	10,642	3.02	▲0.5			
Invalid ballots	6,375	1.81	▲0.1			
Total	352,179	100.00				
Registered voters/turnout	654,655	54.55	▼1.8			
Source: Resultados Aveiro

=== Beja ===
Summary of the 6 October 2019 Assembly of the Republic elections results in Beja
Parties	Votes	%	±pp swing	MPs		
Parties	Votes	%	±pp swing	2015	2019	±
Socialist	26,161	40.71	▲3.4	1	2	▲1
Unitary Democratic Coalition	14,655	22.80	▼2.2	1	1	0
Social Democratic	8,544	13.29	(Note: The Social Democratic Party (PSD) and the People's Party (CDS–PP) contested the 2015 election in a coalition called Portugal Ahead (PàF) and won a combined 20.11% of the vote in Beja district, electing 1 seat, 1 PSD.)	1	0	▼1
Left Bloc	5,833	9.08	▲0.9	0	0	0
People's	1,480	2.30		0	0	0
Chega	1,313	2.04	—N/a	—N/a	0	—N/a
People–Animals–Nature	1,269	1.97	▲1.2	0	0	0
Portuguese Workers' Communist	865	1.35	▼1.3	0	0	0
LIVRE	397	0.62	▲0.2	0	0	0
Liberal Initiative	279	0.43	—N/a	—N/a	0	—N/a
Alliance	252	0.39	—N/a	—N/a	0	—N/a
National Renovator	200	0.31	▼0.1	0	0	0
Earth	169	0.26	▼0.0	0	0	0
We, the Citizens!	118	0.18	▼0.0	0	0	0
Democratic Republican	101	0.16	▼0.3	0	0	0
People's Monarchist	95	0.15	▼0.1	0	0	0
Labour	73	0.11	—N/a	—N/a	0	—N/a
Total valid	61,804	96.17	▼0.7	3	3	0
Blank ballots	1,371	2.13	▲0.5			
Invalid ballots	1,094	1.70	▲0.2			
Total	64,829	100.00				
Registered voters/turnout	122,987	52.26	▼5.5			
Source: Resultados Beja

=== Braga ===
Summary of the 6 October 2019 Assembly of the Republic elections results in Braga
Parties	Votes	%	±pp swing	MPs		
Parties	Votes	%	±pp swing	2015	2019	±
Socialist	169,468	36.40	▲5.5	7	8	▲1
Social Democratic	158,652	34.08	(Note: The Social Democratic Party (PSD) and the People's Party (CDS–PP) contested the 2015 election in a coalition called Portugal Ahead (PàF) and won a combined 45.61% of the vote in Braga district, electing a total of 10 seats, 8 PSD and 2 CDS–PP.)	8	8	0
Left Bloc	41,331	8.88	▲0.1	1	2	▲1
People's	19,127	4.11		2	1	▼1
Unitary Democratic Coalition	18,443	3.96	▼1.2	1	0	▼1
People–Animals–Nature	11,934	2.56	▲1.8	0	0	0
Liberal Initiative	3,804	0.82	—N/a	—N/a	0	—N/a
React, Include, Recycle	3,469	0.75	—N/a	—N/a	0	—N/a
LIVRE	3,179	0.68	▲0.2	0	0	0
Chega	3,177	0.68	—N/a	—N/a	0	—N/a
Portuguese Workers' Communist	2,318	0.50	▼0.6	0	0	0
Alliance	2,182	0.47	—N/a	—N/a	0	—N/a
We, the Citizens!	1,017	0.22	▲0.0	0	0	0
Earth	1,000	0.21	▼0.1	0	0	0
National Renovator	862	0.19	▼0.2	0	0	0
Democratic Republican	620	0.13	▼1.5	0	0	0
United Party of Retirees and Pensioners	549	0.12	▲0.1	0	0	0
Socialist Alternative Movement	544	0.12	(Note: The Socialist Alternative Movement (MAS) and the Portuguese Labour Party (PTP) contested the 2015 election in a coalition called AGIR! (Act!) and won a combined 0.34% of the vote in Braga district.)	0	0	0
Labour	522	0.11		0	0	0
People's Monarchist	428	0.09	▼0.1	0	0	0
Together for the People	411	0.09	▼0.0	0	0	0
Total valid	443,037	95.16	▼1.3	19	19	0
Blank ballots	14,504	3.12	▲0.9			
Invalid ballots	6,375	1.72	▲0.4			
Total	465,570	100.00				
Registered voters/turnout	778,173	59.83	▼0.4			
Source: Resultados Braga

=== Bragança ===
Summary of the 6 October 2019 Assembly of the Republic elections results in Bragança
Parties	Votes	%	±pp swing	MPs		
Parties	Votes	%	±pp swing	2015	2019	±
Social Democratic	25,909	40.78	(Note: The Social Democratic Party (PSD) and the People's Party (CDS–PP) contested the 2015 election in a coalition called Portugal Ahead (PàF) and won a combined 49.41% of the vote in Bragança district, electing a total of 2 seats, 2 PSD.)	2	2	0
Socialist	23,215	36.54	▲2.5	1	1	0
Left Bloc	3,833	6.03	▲0.5	0	0	0
People's	2,831	4.46		0	0	0
Unitary Democratic Coalition	1,347	2.12	▼1.0	0	0	0
People–Animals–Nature	831	1.31	▲0.8	0	0	0
Chega	533	0.84	—N/a	—N/a	0	—N/a
React, Include, Recycle	360	0.57	—N/a	—N/a	0	—N/a
Portuguese Workers' Communist	313	0.49	▼0.3	0	0	0
Alliance	309	0.49	—N/a	—N/a	0	—N/a
Liberal Initiative	271	0.43	—N/a	—N/a	0	—N/a
LIVRE	270	0.42	▲0.0	0	0	0
United Party of Retirees and Pensioners	184	0.29	—N/a	—N/a	0	—N/a
National Renovator	172	0.27	0.0	0	0	0
We, the Citizens!	137	0.22	▼0.0	0	0	0
Democratic Republican	121	0.19	▼0.6	0	0	0
Labour	101	0.16	—N/a	—N/a	0	—N/a
People's Monarchist	75	0.12	▼0.2	0	0	0
Total valid	60,812	95.72	▼0.5	3	3	0
Blank ballots	1,305	2.05	▲0.3			
Invalid ballots	1,417	2.23	▲0.2			
Total	63,534	100.00				
Registered voters/turnout	141,541	44.89	▼2.3			
Source: Resultados Bragança

=== Castelo Branco ===
Summary of the 6 October 2019 Assembly of the Republic elections results in Castelo Branco
Parties	Votes	%	±pp swing	MPs		
Parties	Votes	%	±pp swing	2015	2019	±
Socialist	38,302	40.88	▲2.0	2	3	▲1
Social Democratic	24,674	26.33	(Note: The Social Democratic Party (PSD) and the People's Party (CDS–PP) contested the 2015 election in a coalition called Portugal Ahead (PàF) and won a combined 35.31% of the vote in Castelo Branco district, electing a total of 2 seats, 2 PSD.)	2	1	▼1
Left Bloc	10,352	11.05	▲1.1	0	0	0
Unitary Democratic Coalition	4,451	4.75	▼1.3	0	0	0
People's	3,479	3.71		0	0	0
People–Animals–Nature	2,231	2.38	▲1.6	0	0	0
Chega	1,187	1.27	—N/a	—N/a	0	—N/a
LIVRE	834	0.89	▲0.4	0	0	0
Alliance	715	0.76	—N/a	—N/a	0	—N/a
Portuguese Workers' Communist	694	0.74	▼0.3	0	0	0
Liberal Initiative	543	0.58	—N/a	—N/a	0	—N/a
React, Include, Recycle	541	0.58	—N/a	—N/a	0	—N/a
United Party of Retirees and Pensioners	273	0.29	▲0.0	0	0	0
National Renovator	246	0.26	▼0.2	0	0	0
Earth	226	0.24	▼0.2	0	0	0
People's Monarchist	183	0.20	▼0.3	0	0	0
Labour	157	0.17	—N/a	—N/a	0	—N/a
Democratic Republican	125	0.13	▼0.9	0	0	0
Total valid	89,213	95.22	▼0.7	4	4	0
Blank ballots	2,250	2.40	▲0.4			
Invalid ballots	2,232	2.38	▲0.3			
Total	93,695	100.00				
Registered voters/turnout	170,075	55.09	▼2.4			
Source: Resultados Castelo Branco

=== Coimbra ===
Summary of the 6 October 2019 Assembly of the Republic elections results in Coimbra
Parties	Votes	%	±pp swing	MPs		
Parties	Votes	%	±pp swing	2015	2019	±
Socialist	79,590	39.02	▲3.7	4	5	▲1
Social Democratic	54,279	26.61	(Note: The Social Democratic Party (PSD) and the People's Party (CDS–PP) contested the 2015 election in a coalition called Portugal Ahead (PàF) and won a combined 37.18% of the vote in Coimbra district, electing a total of 4 seats, 4 PSD.)	4	3	▼1
Left Bloc	22,808	11.18	▲1.3	1	1	0
Unitary Democratic Coalition	11,402	5.59	▼1.4	0	0	0
People's	7,103	3.48		0	0	0
People–Animals–Nature	5,355	2.63	▲1.6	0	0	0
Alliance	2,106	1.03	—N/a	—N/a	0	—N/a
LIVRE	1,926	0.94	▲0.3	0	0	0
Chega	1,836	0.90	—N/a	—N/a	0	—N/a
Liberal Initiative	1,676	0.82	—N/a	—N/a	0	—N/a
React, Include, Recycle	1,154	0.57	—N/a	—N/a	0	—N/a
Portuguese Workers' Communist	1,031	0.51	▼0.4	0	0	0
National Renovator	623	0.31	▼0.2	0	0	0
Democratic Republican	453	0.22	▼1.4	0	0	0
We, the Citizens!	441	0.22	▼0.1	0	0	0
Earth	417	0.20	▼0.2	0	0	0
United Party of Retirees and Pensioners	402	0.20	0.0	0	0	0
Socialist Alternative Movement	251	0.12	—N/a	—N/a	0	—N/a
People's Monarchist	245	0.12	▼0.1	0	0	0
Together for the People	149	0.07	▼0.0	0	0	0
Total valid	193,247	94.75	▼1.0	9	9	0
Blank ballots	6,889	3.38	▲0.7			
Invalid ballots	3,814	1.87	▲0.3			
Total	203,950	100.00				
Registered voters/turnout	380,095	53.66	▼2.7			
Source: Resultados Coimbra

=== Évora ===
Summary of the 6 October 2019 Assembly of the Republic elections results in Évora
Parties	Votes	%	±pp swing	MPs		
Parties	Votes	%	±pp swing	2015	2019	±
Socialist	28,371	38.33	▲0.8	1	2	▲1
Unitary Democratic Coalition	13,980	18.89	▼3.0	1	1	0
Social Democratic	12,947	17.48	(Note: The Social Democratic Party (PSD) and the People's Party (CDS–PP) contested the 2015 election in a coalition called Portugal Ahead (PàF) and won a combined 23.96% of the vote in Évora district, electing 1 seat, 1 PSD.)	1	0	▼1
Left Bloc	6,624	8.95	▲0.4	0	0	0
People's	2,535	3.42		0	0	0
Chega	1,645	2.22	—N/a	—N/a	0	—N/a
People–Animals–Nature	1,446	1.95	▲1.1	0	0	0
Portuguese Workers' Communist	922	1.25	▼0.2	0	0	0
LIVRE	503	0.68	▲0.3	0	0	0
Liberal Initiative	490	0.66	—N/a	—N/a	0	—N/a
Alliance	459	0.62	—N/a	—N/a	0	—N/a
React, Include, Recycle	334	0.45	—N/a	—N/a	0	—N/a
We, the Citizens!	311	0.42	▲0.1	0	0	0
National Renovator	179	0.24	▼0.1	0	0	0
United Party of Retirees and Pensioners	154	0.19	▲0.0	0	0	0
Earth	143	0.24	▼0.1	0	0	0
People's Monarchist	114	0.15	▼0.3	0	0	0
Labour	82	0.11	—N/a	—N/a	0	—N/a
Democratic Republican	70	0.09	▼0.4	0	0	0
Total valid	71,299	96.32	▼0.7	3	3	0
Blank ballots	1,680	2.27	▲0.6			
Invalid ballots	1,047	1.41	▲0.1			
Total	74,026	100.00				
Registered voters/turnout	136,696	54.15	▼5.7			
Source: Resultados Évora

=== Faro ===
Summary of the 6 October 2019 Assembly of the Republic elections results in Faro
Parties	Votes	%	±pp swing	MPs		
Parties	Votes	%	±pp swing	2015	2019	±
Socialist	63,469	36.75	▲4.0	4	5	▲1
Social Democratic	38,516	22.30	(Note: The Social Democratic Party (PSD) and the People's Party (CDS–PP) contested the 2015 election in a coalition called Portugal Ahead (PàF) and won a combined 31.47% of the vote in Faro district, electing a total of 3 seats, 2 PSD and 1 CDS–PP.)	2	3	▲1
Left Bloc	21,255	12.31	▼1.8	1	1	0
Unitary Democratic Coalition	12,180	7.05	▼1.6	1	0	▼1
People–Animals–Nature	8,238	4.77	▲2.8	0	0	0
People's	6,572	3.81		1	0	▼1
Chega	3,690	2.14	—N/a	—N/a	0	—N/a
LIVRE	1,704	0.99	▲0.3	0	0	0
Portuguese Workers' Communist	1,513	0.88	▼0.7	0	0	0
Liberal Initiative	1,424	0.82	—N/a	—N/a	0	—N/a
Alliance	1,310	0.76	—N/a	—N/a	0	—N/a
React, Include, Recycle	1,035	0.60	—N/a	—N/a	0	—N/a
Earth	740	0.43	▼0.2	0	0	0
We, the Citizens!	733	0.42	▼0.3	0	0	0
National Renovator	729	0.42	▼0.3	0	0	0
United Party of Retirees and Pensioners	499	0.29	▼0.2	0	0	0
People's Monarchist	408	0.24	▼0.2	0	0	0
Democratic Republican	359	0.21	▼1.0	0	0	0
Labour	356	0.21	—N/a	—N/a	0	—N/a
Total valid	164,730	95.39	▼0.7	9	9	0
Blank ballots	4,900	2.84	▲0.6			
Invalid ballots	3,069	1.78	▲0.2			
Total	172,699	100.00				
Registered voters/turnout	376,801	45.83	▼5.5			
Source: Resultados Faro

=== Guarda ===
Summary of the 6 October 2019 Assembly of the Republic elections results in Guarda
Parties	Votes	%	±pp swing	MPs		
Parties	Votes	%	±pp swing	2015	2019	±
Socialist	28,783	37.55	▲3.8	2	2	0
Social Democratic	26,343	34.37	(Note: The Social Democratic Party (PSD) and the People's Party (CDS–PP) contested the 2015 election in a coalition called Portugal Ahead (PàF) and won a combined 45.59% of the vote in Guarda district, electing a total of 2 seats, 2 PSD.)	2	1	▼1
Left Bloc	5,990	7.81	▲0.4	0	0	0
People's	3,823	4.99		0	0	0
Unitary Democratic Coalition	2,295	2.99	▼1.0	0	0	0
People–Animals–Nature	1,223	1.60	▲0.7	0	0	0
Chega	1,135	1.48	—N/a	—N/a	0	—N/a
Liberal Initiative	461	0.60	—N/a	—N/a	0	—N/a
React, Include, Recycle	458	0.60	—N/a	—N/a	0	—N/a
Alliance	406	0.53	—N/a	—N/a	0	—N/a
LIVRE	373	0.49	▲0.2	0	0	0
Portuguese Workers' Communist	363	0.47	▼0.3	0	0	0
Labour	171	0.22	—N/a	—N/a	0	—N/a
National Renovator	165	0.22	▼0.3	0	0	0
United Party of Retirees and Pensioners	154	0.20	▲0.0	0	0	0
Earth	122	0.16	▼0.2	0	0	0
We, the Citizens!	118	0.15	▼0.0	0	0	0
Democratic Republican	103	0.13	▼1.0	0	0	0
People's Monarchist	80	0.10	▼0.2	0	0	0
Total valid	72,566	94.67	▼1.0	4	3	▼1
Blank ballots	2,026	2.64	▲0.6			
Invalid ballots	2,057	2.68	▲0.4			
Total	76,649	100.00				
Registered voters/turnout	151,535	50.58	▼1.7			
Source: Resultados Guarda

=== Leiria ===
Summary of the 6 October 2019 Assembly of the Republic elections results in Leiria
Parties	Votes	%	±pp swing	MPs		
Parties	Votes	%	±pp swing	2015	2019	±
Social Democratic	74,961	33.52	(Note: The Social Democratic Party (PSD) and the People's Party (CDS–PP) contested the 2015 election in a coalition called Portugal Ahead (PàF) and won a combined 48.42% of the vote in Leiria district, electing a total of 6 seats, 5 PSD and 1 CDS–PP.)	5	5	0
Socialist	69,482	31.07	▲6.3	3	4	▲1
Left Bloc	20,925	9.36	▼0.3	1	1	0
People's	11,905	5.52		1	0	▼1
Unitary Democratic Coalition	9,537	4.26	▼0.8	0	0	0
People–Animals–Nature	6,413	2.87	▲1.7	0	0	0
Chega	3,321	1.49	—N/a	—N/a	0	—N/a
Alliance	2,183	0.98	—N/a	—N/a	0	—N/a
Liberal Initiative	2,054	0.92	—N/a	—N/a	0	—N/a
LIVRE	2,053	0.92	▲0.2	0	0	0
React, Include, Recycle	1,653	0.74	—N/a	—N/a	0	—N/a
Portuguese Workers' Communist	1,631	0.73	▼0.4	0	0	0
Earth	667	0.30	▼0.2	0	0	0
National Renovator	622	0.28	▼0.2	0	0	0
We, the Citizens!	583	0.26	▼0.1	0	0	0
Democratic Republican	546	0.24	▼1.5	0	0	0
People's Monarchist	492	0.22	▼0.1	0	0	0
United Party of Retirees and Pensioners	486	0.22	▼0.1	0	0	0
Labour	380	0.17	(Note: The Socialist Alternative Movement (MAS) and the Portuguese Labour Party (PTP) contested the 2015 election in a coalition called AGIR! (Act!) and won a combined 0.38% of the vote in Leiria district.)	0	0	0
Together for the People	217	0.10	▼0.1	0	0	0
Socialist Alternative Movement	167	0.07		0	0	0
Total valid	210,278	94.03	▼1.1	10	10	0
Blank ballots	8,202	3.67	▲0.8			
Invalid ballots	5,152	2.30	▲0.3			
Total	223,632	100.00				
Registered voters/turnout	415,245	53.86	▼2.4			
Source: Resultados Leiria

=== Lisbon ===
Summary of the 6 October 2019 Assembly of the Republic elections results in Lisbon
Parties	Votes	%	±pp swing	MPs		
Parties	Votes	%	±pp swing	2015	2019	±
Socialist	404,677	36.74	▲3.2	18	20	▲2
Social Democratic	248,937	22.60	(Note: The Social Democratic Party (PSD) and the People's Party (CDS–PP) contested the 2015 election in a coalition called Portugal Ahead (PàF) and won a combined 34.68% of the vote in Lisbon district, electing a total of 18 seats, 13 PSD and 5 CDS–PP.)	13	12	▼1
Left Bloc	106,944	9.71	▼1.2	5	5	0
Unitary Democratic Coalition	85,789	7.79	▼2.0	5	4	▼1
People–Animals–Nature	48,536	4.41	▲2.4	1	2	▲1
People's	48,502	4.40		5	2	▼3
Liberal Initiative	27,166	2.47	—N/a	—N/a	1	—N/a
LIVRE	22,807	2.07	▲0.8	0	1	▲1
Chega	22,053	2.00	—N/a	—N/a	1	—N/a
Alliance	14,036	1.27	—N/a	—N/a	0	—N/a
Portuguese Workers' Communist	8,923	0.81	▼0.2	0	0	0
National Renovator	4,819	0.44	▼0.2	0	0	0
React, Include, Recycle	4,530	0.41	—N/a	—N/a	0	—N/a
Earth	2,783	0.25	▼0.2	0	0	0
We, the Citizens!	2,713	0.25	▼0.0	0	0	0
United Party of Retirees and Pensioners	2,101	0.19	▼0.2	0	0	0
People's Monarchist	1,958	0.18	▼0.0	0	0	0
Democratic Republican	1,884	0.17	▼0.7	0	0	0
Socialist Alternative Movement	1,236	0.11	(Note: The Socialist Alternative Movement (MAS) and the Portuguese Labour Party (PTP) contested the 2015 election in a coalition called AGIR! (Act!) and won a combined 0.44% of the vote in Lisbon district.)	0	0	0
Labour	1,169	0.11		0	0	0
Total valid	1,061,563	96.39	▼0.2	47	48	▲1
Blank ballots	23,702	2.15	▲0.2			
Invalid ballots	16,081	1.46	▼0.0			
Total	1,101,346	100.00				
Registered voters/turnout	1,921,047	57.33	▼3.3			
Source: Resultados Lisboa

=== Madeira ===
Summary of the 6 October 2019 Assembly of the Republic elections results in Madeira
Parties	Votes	%	±pp swing	MPs		
Parties	Votes	%	±pp swing	2015	2019	±
Social Democratic	48,231	37.15	▼0.6	3	3	0
Socialist	43,373	33.41	▲12.5	2	3	▲1
People's	7,852	6.05	▲0.0	0	0	0
Together for the People	7,125	5.49	▼1.4	0	0	0
Left Bloc	6,806	5.24	▼5.5	1	0	▼1
Unitary Democratic Coalition	2,702	2.08	▼1.5	0	0	0
People–Animals–Nature	2,361	1.82	▲0.0	0	0	0
Labour	1,185	0.91	▼0.5	0	0	0
React, Include, Recycle	1,185	0.91	—N/a	—N/a	0	—N/a
Liberal Initiative	922	0.71	—N/a	—N/a	0	—N/a
Chega	911	0.70	—N/a	—N/a	0	—N/a
United Party of Retirees and Pensioners	801	0.62	—N/a	—N/a	0	—N/a
Portuguese Workers' Communist	790	0.61	▼0.7	0	0	0
Alliance	630	0.49	—N/a	—N/a	0	—N/a
LIVRE	480	0.37	▼0.6	0	0	0
Earth	465	0.36	▼1.0	0	0	0
Democratic Republican	443	0.34	▼1.4	0	0	0
National Renovator	202	0.16	▼0.5	0	0	0
We, the Citizens!	188	0.14	▼0.8	0	0	0
People's Monarchist	180	0.14	▼0.3	0	0	0
Total valid	126,832	97.70	▲1.4	6	6	0
Blank ballots	697	0.54	▼0.3			
Invalid ballots	2,292	1.77	▼1.1			
Total	129,821	100.00				
Registered voters/turnout	257,907	50.34	▲1.4			
Source: Resultados Madeira

=== Portalegre ===
Summary of the 6 October 2019 Assembly of the Republic elections results in Portalegre
Parties	Votes	%	±pp swing	MPs		
Parties	Votes	%	±pp swing	2015	2019	±
Socialist	23,013	44.60	▲2.2	1	2	▲1
Social Democratic	10,375	20.11	(Note: The Social Democratic Party (PSD) and the People's Party (CDS–PP) contested the 2015 election in a coalition called Portugal Ahead (PàF) and won a combined 27.63% of the vote in Portalegre district, electing 1 seat, 1 PSD.)	1	0	▼1
Unitary Democratic Coalition	5,480	10.62	▼1.6	0	0	0
Left Bloc	4,166	8.07	▼1.1	0	0	0
People's	1,961	3.80		0	0	0
Chega	1,407	2.73	—N/a	—N/a	0	—N/a
People–Animals–Nature	856	1.66	▲0.9	0	0	0
Portuguese Workers' Communist	628	1.22	▼0.5	0	0	0
LIVRE	291	0.56	▲0.3	0	0	0
Alliance	269	0.52	—N/a	—N/a	0	—N/a
Liberal Initiative	255	0.49	—N/a	—N/a	0	—N/a
React, Include, Recycle	208	0.40	—N/a	—N/a	0	—N/a
National Renovator	156	0.30	▼0.1	0	0	0
United Party of Retirees and Pensioners	114	0.22	▼0.0	0	0	0
Earth	93	0.18	▼0.1	0	0	0
Democratic Republican	68	0.13	▼0.4	0	0	0
Labour	61	0.12	—N/a	—N/a	0	—N/a
Total valid	49,401	95.74	▼0.9	2	2	0
Blank ballots	1,200	2.33	▲0.4			
Invalid ballots	999	1.94	▲0.4			
Total	51,600	100.00				
Registered voters/turnout	96,931	53.53	▼4.8			
Source: Resultados Portalegre

=== Porto ===
Summary of the 6 October 2019 Assembly of the Republic elections results in Porto
Parties	Votes	%	±pp swing	MPs		
Parties	Votes	%	±pp swing	2015	2019	±
Socialist	342,496	36.65	▲3.9	14	17	▲3
Social Democratic	291,183	31.16	(Note: The Social Democratic Party (PSD) and the People's Party (CDS–PP) contested the 2015 election in a coalition called Portugal Ahead (PàF) and won a combined 39.59% of the vote in Porto district, electing a total of 17 seats, 14 PSD and 3 CDS–PP.)	14	15	▲1
Left Bloc	94,553	10.12	▼1.0	5	4	▼1
Unitary Democratic Coalition	44,859	4.80	▼2.0	3	2	▼1
People–Animals–Nature	32,328	3.46	▲1.9	0	1	▲1
People's	31,181	3.34		3	1	▼2
Liberal Initiative	14,221	1.52	—N/a	—N/a	0	—N/a
React, Include, Recycle	10,545	1.13	—N/a	—N/a	0	—N/a
LIVRE	8,952	0.96	▲0.5	0	0	0
Chega	5,708	0.61	—N/a	—N/a	0	—N/a
Portuguese Workers' Communist	5,047	0.54	▼0.6	0	0	0
Alliance	4,370	0.47	—N/a	—N/a	0	—N/a
National Renovator	1,948	0.21	▼0.3	0	0	0
United Party of Retirees and Pensioners	1,899	0.20	▲0.0	0	0	0
Earth	1,721	0.18	▼0.2	0	0	0
We, the Citizens!	1,656	0.18	▲0.1	0	0	0
Democratic Republican	1,446	0.15	▼1.0	0	0	0
Labour	1,395	0.15	(Note: The Socialist Alternative Movement (MAS) and the Portuguese Labour Party (PTP) contested the 2015 election in a coalition called AGIR! (Act!) and won a combined 0.29% of the vote in Porto district.)	0	0	0
Together for the People	1,074	0.11	▼0.0	0	0	0
People's Monarchist	857	0.09	▼0.2	0	0	0
Socialist Alternative Movement	522	0.06		0	0	0
Total valid	897,961	96.10	▼0.5	39	40	▲1
Blank ballots	21,233	2.27	▲0.3			
Invalid ballots	15,185	1.63	▲0.1			
Total	934,379	100.00				
Registered voters/turnout	1,594,788	58.59	▼1.7			
Source: Resultados Porto

=== Santarém ===
Summary of the 6 October 2019 Assembly of the Republic elections results in Santarém
Parties	Votes	%	±pp swing	MPs		
Parties	Votes	%	±pp swing	2015	2019	±
Socialist	76,836	37.13	▲4.2	3	4	▲1
Social Democratic	52,141	25.20	(Note: The Social Democratic Party (PSD) and the People's Party (CDS–PP) contested the 2015 election in a coalition called Portugal Ahead (PàF) and won a combined 35.82% of the vote in Santarém district, electing a total of 4 seats, 3 PSD and 1 CDS–PP.)	3	3	0
Left Bloc	21,141	10.22	▼0.6	1	1	0
Unitary Democratic Coalition	15,662	7.57	▼2.0	1	1	0
People's	9,793	4.73		1	0	▼1
People–Animals–Nature	5,364	2.59	▲1.4	0	0	0
Chega	4,210	2.03	—N/a	—N/a	0	—N/a
LIVRE	1,782	0.86	▲0.3	0	0	0
Alliance	1,689	0.82	—N/a	—N/a	0	—N/a
Liberal Initiative	1,605	0.78	—N/a	—N/a	0	—N/a
Portuguese Workers' Communist	1,432	0.69	▼0.6	0	0	0
React, Include, Recycle	1,266	0.61	—N/a	—N/a	0	—N/a
National Renovator	834	0.40	▼0.1	0	0	0
We, the Citizens!	814	0.39	▼0.0	0	0	0
Democratic Republican	605	0.29	▼0.7	0	0	0
United Party of Retirees and Pensioners	498	0.24	▼0.2	0	0	0
Earth	471	0.23	▼0.3	0	0	0
People's Monarchist	468	0.23	▼0.2	0	0	0
Labour	265	0.13	—N/a	—N/a	0	—N/a
Total valid	196,885	95.15	▼0.8	9	9	0
Blank ballots	6,022	2.91	▲0.6			
Invalid ballots	4,011	1.94	▲0.2			
Total	206,918	100.00				
Registered voters/turnout	380,889	54.33	▲1.4			
Source: Resultados Santarém

=== Setúbal ===
Summary of the 6 October 2019 Assembly of the Republic elections results in Setúbal
Parties	Votes	%	±pp swing	MPs		
Parties	Votes	%	±pp swing	2015	2019	±
Socialist	152,433	38.58	▲4.3	7	9	▲2
Unitary Democratic Coalition	62,236	15.75	▼3.0	4	3	▼1
Social Democratic	56,860	14.39	(Note: The Social Democratic Party (PSD) and the People's Party (CDS–PP) contested the 2015 election in a coalition called Portugal Ahead (PàF) and won a combined 22.59% of the vote in Setúbal district, electing a total of 5 seats, 4 PSD and 1 CDS–PP.)	4	3	▼1
Left Bloc	47,864	12.11	▼1.0	2	2	0
People–Animals–Nature	17,529	4.44	▲2.5	0	1	▲1
People's	11,703	2.96		1	0	▼1
Chega	7,643	1.93	—N/a	—N/a	0	—N/a
LIVRE	4,874	1.23	▲0.2	0	0	0
Liberal Initiative	4,133	1.05	—N/a	—N/a	0	—N/a
Portuguese Workers' Communist	3,538	0.90	▼0.7	0	0	0
Alliance	2,889	0.73	—N/a	—N/a	0	—N/a
React, Include, Recycle	2,107	0.53	—N/a	—N/a	0	—N/a
National Renovator	1,771	0.45	▼0.2	0	0	0
Earth	1,106	0.28	▼0.1	0	0	0
United Party of Retirees and Pensioners	1,033	0.26	▼0.2	0	0	0
We, the Citizens!	1,025	0.26	▼0.2	0	0	0
People's Monarchist	739	0.19	▼0.0	0	0	0
Democratic Republican	692	0.18	▼0.8	0	0	0
Labour	431	0.11	(Note: The Socialist Alternative Movement (MAS) and the Portuguese Labour Party (PTP) contested the 2015 election in a coalition called AGIR! (Act!) and won a combined 0.43% of the vote in Setúbal district.)	0	0	0
Socialist Alternative Movement	326	0.08		0	0	0
Total valid	380,931	96.40	▼0.4	18	18	0
Blank ballots	8,191	2.07	▲0.4			
Invalid ballots	6,038	1.53	▲0.0			
Total	395,160	100.00				
Registered voters/turnout	737,175	53.60	▼4.7			
Source: Resultados Setúbal

=== Viana do Castelo ===
Summary of the 6 October 2019 Assembly of the Republic elections results in Viana do Castelo
Parties	Votes	%	±pp swing	MPs		
Parties	Votes	%	±pp swing	2015	2019	±
Socialist	42,392	34.77	▲5.0	2	3	▲1
Social Democratic	41,196	33.79	(Note: The Social Democratic Party (PSD) and the People's Party (CDS–PP) contested the 2015 election in a coalition called Portugal Ahead (PàF) and won a combined 45.54% of the vote in Viana do Castelo district, electing a total of 4 seats, 3 PSD and 1 CDS–PP.)	3	3	0
Left Bloc	10,320	8.47	▲0.5	0	0	0
People's	7,576	6.21		1	0	▼1
Unitary Democratic Coalition	4,839	3.97	▼1.2	0	0	0
People–Animals–Nature	2,876	2.36	▲1.5	0	0	0
React, Include, Recycle	1,058	0.87	—N/a	—N/a	0	—N/a
Chega	858	0.70	—N/a	—N/a	0	—N/a
Liberal Initiative	692	0.57	—N/a	—N/a	0	—N/a
LIVRE	688	0.56	▲0.3	0	0	0
Alliance	679	0.56	—N/a	—N/a	0	—N/a
Portuguese Workers' Communist	671	0.55	▼0.4	0	0	0
Together for the People	587	0.48	▲0.4	0	0	0
National Renovator	292	0.24	▼0.2	0	0	0
Democratic Republican	281	0.23	▼1.7	0	0	0
We, the Citizens!	259	0.21	—N/a	—N/a	0	—N/a
United Party of Retirees and Pensioners	212	0.17	0.0	0	0	0
Earth	209	0.17	▼0.2	0	0	0
Labour	208	0.17	—N/a	—N/a	0	—N/a
People's Monarchist	204	0.17	▼0.2	0	0	0
Total valid	116,097	95.23	▼0.6	6	6	0
Blank ballots	3,617	2.97	▲0.5			
Invalid ballots	2,199	1.80	▲0.1			
Total	121,913	100.00				
Registered voters/turnout	240,917	50.60	▼0.1			
Source: Resultados Viana do Castelo

=== Vila Real ===
Summary of the 6 October 2019 Assembly of the Republic elections results in Vila Real
Parties	Votes	%	±pp swing	MPs		
Parties	Votes	%	±pp swing	2015	2019	±
Social Democratic	39,143	39.04	(Note: The Social Democratic Party (PSD) and the People's Party (CDS–PP) contested the 2015 election in a coalition called Portugal Ahead (PàF) and won a combined 51.02% of the vote in Vila Real district, electing a total of 3 seats, 3 PSD.)	3	3	0
Socialist	37,306	37.21	▲4.1	2	2	0
Left Bloc	6,078	6.06	▲0.9	0	0	0
People's	4,510	4.50		0	0	0
Unitary Democratic Coalition	2,519	2.51	▼0.5	0	0	0
People–Animals–Nature	1,651	1.65	▲1.1	0	0	0
Chega	791	0.79	—N/a	—N/a	0	—N/a
Alliance	700	0.70	—N/a	—N/a	0	—N/a
React, Include, Recycle	648	0.65	—N/a	—N/a	0	—N/a
Portuguese Workers' Communist	579	0.58	▼0.3	0	0	0
LIVRE	549	0.55	▲0.2	0	0	0
Liberal Initiative	425	0.42	—N/a	—N/a	0	—N/a
People's Monarchist	188	0.19	▼0.1	0	0	0
Democratic Republican	185	0.18	▼0.5	0	0	0
We, the Citizens!	171	0.17	▼0.1	0	0	0
National Renovator	162	0.16	▼0.1	0	0	0
Total valid	95,605	95.36	▼1.1	5	5	0
Blank ballots	2,258	2.25	▲0.5			
Invalid ballots	2,397	2.39	▲0.6			
Total	100,260	100.00				
Registered voters/turnout	219,087	45.76	▼2.5			
Source: Resultados Vila Real

=== Viseu ===
Summary of the 6 October 2019 Assembly of the Republic elections results in Viseu
Parties	Votes	%	±pp swing	MPs		
Parties	Votes	%	±pp swing	2015	2019	±
Social Democratic	64,373	36.24	(Note: The Social Democratic Party (PSD) and the People's Party (CDS–PP) contested the 2015 election in a coalition called Portugal Ahead (PàF) and won a combined 51.05% of the vote in Viseu district, electing a total of 6 seats, 5 PSD and 1 CDS–PP.)	5	4	▼1
Socialist	62,833	35.37	▲5.7	3	4	▲1
Left Bloc	13,956	7.86	▲1.2	0	0	0
People's	10,462	5.89		1	0	▼1
Unitary Democratic Coalition	4,082	2.30	▼1.2	0	0	0
People–Animals–Nature	3,778	2.13	▲1.4	0	0	0
Chega	1,721	0.97	—N/a	—N/a	0	—N/a
React, Include, Recycle	1,336	0.75	—N/a	—N/a	0	—N/a
Alliance	1,215	0.68	—N/a	—N/a	0	—N/a
Liberal Initiative	974	0.55	—N/a	—N/a	0	—N/a
Portuguese Workers' Communist	900	0.51	▼0.4	0	0	0
LIVRE	875	0.49	▼0.0	0	0	0
Democratic Republican	457	0.26	▼0.7	0	0	0
United Party of Retirees and Pensioners	363	0.20	0.0	0	0	0
People's Monarchist	356	0.20	▼0.1	0	0	0
We, the Citizens!	332	0.19	▼0.1	0	0	0
National Renovator	326	0.18	▼0.2	0	0	0
Earth	256	0.14	▼0.3	0	0	0
Labour	239	0.13	—N/a	—N/a	0	—N/a
Together for the People	118	0.07	—N/a	—N/a	0	—N/a
Total valid	168,952	95.11	▼0.8	9	8	▼1
Blank ballots	4,995	2.81	▲0.6			
Invalid ballots	3,700	2.08	▲0.2			
Total	177,647	100.00				
Registered voters/turnout	347,962	51.05	▼0.2			
Source: Resultados Viseu

=== Europe ===
Summary of the 6 October 2019 Assembly of the Republic elections results in Europe
Parties	Votes	%	±pp swing	MPs		
Parties	Votes	%	±pp swing	2015	2019	±
Socialist	31,362	29.06	▼0.8	1	1	0
Social Democratic	20,254	18.77	(Note: The Social Democratic Party (PSD) and the People's Party (CDS–PP) contested the 2015 election in a coalition called Portugal Ahead (PàF) and won a combined 39.10% of the vote in the Europe overseas constituency, electing a total of 1 seat, 1 PSD.)	1	1	0
Left Bloc	6,106	5.66	▼0.1	0	0	0
People–Animals–Nature	5,296	4.91	▲4.0	0	0	0
People's	3,179	2.95		0	0	0
Unitary Democratic Coalition	1,267	2.51	▼3.4	0	0	0
Portuguese Workers' Communist	5,047	1.17	▲0.4	0	0	0
LIVRE	1,166	1.08	▼0.7	0	0	0
Earth	1,012	0.94	▲0.3	0	0	0
Chega	913	0.85	—N/a	—N/a	0	—N/a
Liberal Initiative	874	0.81	—N/a	—N/a	0	—N/a
National Renovator	810	0.75	▲0.4	0	0	0
Democratic Republican	797	0.74	▼0.5	0	0	0
We, the Citizens!	688	0.64	▲0.0	0	0	0
United Party of Retirees and Pensioners	672	0.62	▼0.1	0	0	0
Alliance	558	0.52	—N/a	—N/a	0	—N/a
React, Include, Recycle	553	0.51	—N/a	—N/a	0	—N/a
Labour	493	0.46	(Note: The Socialist Alternative Movement (MAS) and the Portuguese Labour Party (PTP) contested the 2015 election in a coalition called AGIR! (Act!) and won a combined 0.17% of the vote in the Europe overseas constituency)	0	0	0
Together for the People	409	0.38	▲0.2	0	0	0
People's Monarchist	254	0.24	▼0.1	0	0	0
Socialist Alternative Movement	173	0.16		0	0	0
Total valid	79,548	73.71	▼14.6	2	2	0
Blank ballots	1,665	1.54	▲0.8			
Invalid ballots	26,706	24.75	▲13.8			
Total	107,919	100.00				
Registered voters/turnout	895,590	12.05	▼5.4			
Source: Resultados Europa

=== Outside Europe ===
Summary of the 6 October 2019 Assembly of the Republic elections results in Outside Europe
Parties	Votes	%	±pp swing	MPs		
Parties	Votes	%	±pp swing	2015	2019	±
Social Democratic	16,086	33.39	(Note: The Social Democratic Party (PSD) and the People's Party (CDS–PP) contested the 2015 election in a coalition called Portugal Ahead (PàF) and won a combined 48.46% of the vote in the Outside Europe overseas constituency, electing a total of 2 seats, 2 PSD.)	2	1	▼1
Socialist	10,163	20.19	▲9.4	0	1	▲1
People–Animals–Nature	2,357	4.68	▲2.9	0	0	0
People's	2,141	4.25		0	0	0
Democratic Republican	1,744	3.46	▲0.3	0	0	0
Left Bloc	1,404	2.79	▲1.2	0	0	0
Liberal Initiative	1,262	2.51	—N/a	—N/a	0	—N/a
National Renovator	1,046	2.08	▲1.5	0	0	0
Alliance	611	1.21	—N/a	—N/a	0	—N/a
Unitary Democratic Coalition	520	1.03	▼3.4	0	0	0
Chega	465	0.92	—N/a	—N/a	0	—N/a
We, the Citizens!	452	0.90	▼17.0	0	0	0
United Party of Retirees and Pensioners	396	0.79	▲0.0	0	0	0
LIVRE	346	0.69	▲0.2	0	0	0
Earth	319	0.63	▼0.1	0	0	0
Labour	307	0.61	—N/a	—N/a	0	—N/a
People's Monarchist	302	0.60	▲0.3	0	0	0
Portuguese Workers' Communist	273	0.54	▲0.4	0	0	0
Together for the People	196	0.39	▲0.0	0	0	0
React, Include, Recycle	169	0.34	—N/a	—N/a	0	—N/a
Total valid	41,279	82.01	▼6.7	2	2	0
Blank ballots	429	0.85	▲0.3			
Invalid ballots	8,625	17.14	▲6.4			
Total	50,333	100.00				
Registered voters/turnout	571,164	8.81	▼0.1			
Source: Resultados Fora da Europa
