= Gil García =

- Municipality
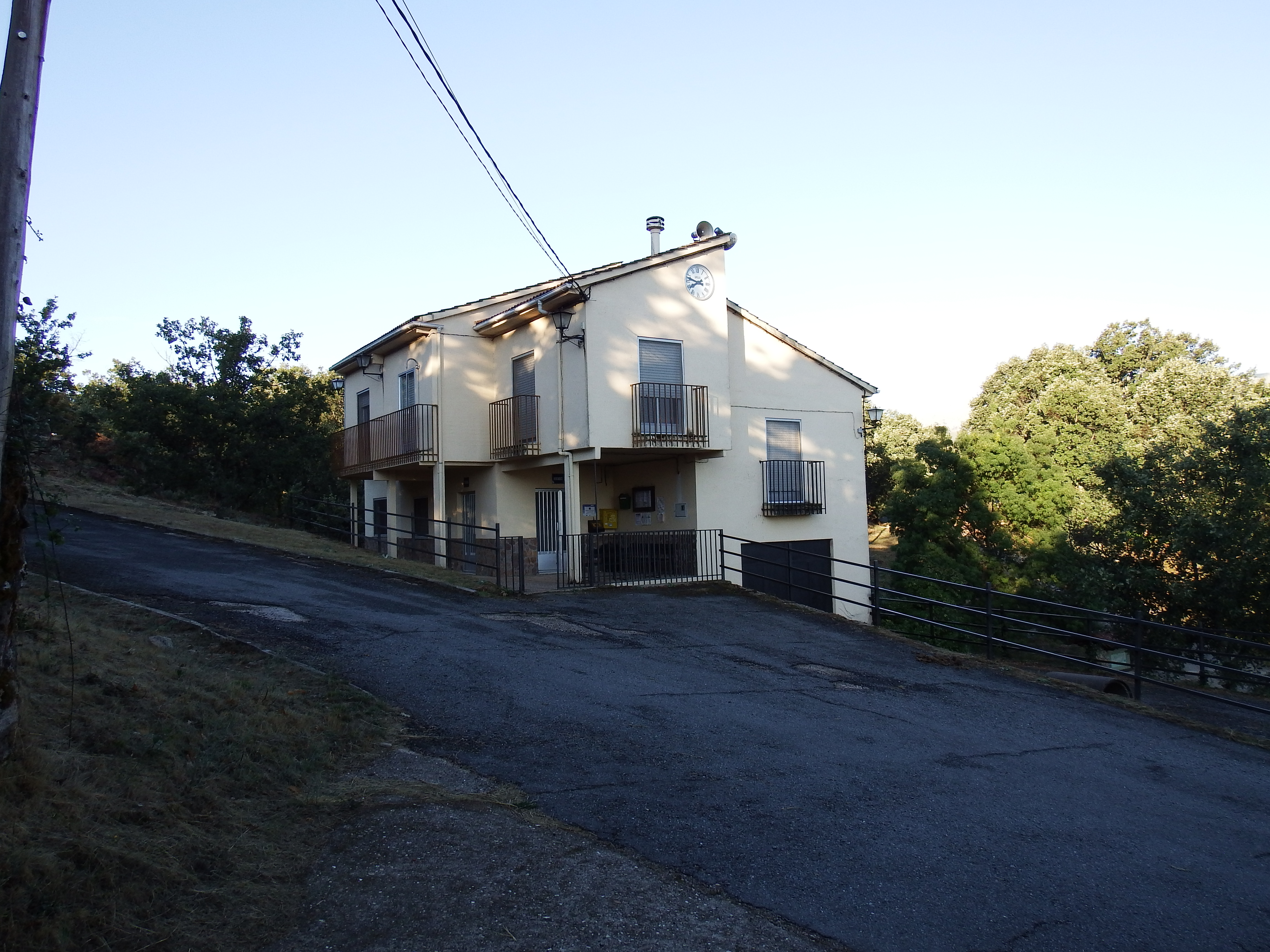
- Town hall

- Location in Spain. Gil García (Spain)
- Coordinates: 40°17′52″N 5°35′39″W
- Country: Spain
- Autonomous community: Castile and León
- Province: Ávila
- Municipality: Gil García

Area
  - Total: 15 km^{2} (5.8 sq mi)
- Elevation: 1,144 m (3,753 ft)

Population (2025-01-01)
  - Total: 45
  - Density: 3.0/km^{2} (7.8/sq mi)
- Time zone: UTC+1 (CET)
  - Summer (DST): UTC+2 (CEST)
- Website: Official website

Gil García is a municipality located in the province of Ávila, Castile and León, Spain.

== Population ==
Historical population
Year	Pop.	±% p.a.
2023	44	—
2024	48	+9.09%
2025	45	−6.25%
Source: INE
