= 2019 Portuguese fuel-tanker drivers' strike =

Strike action

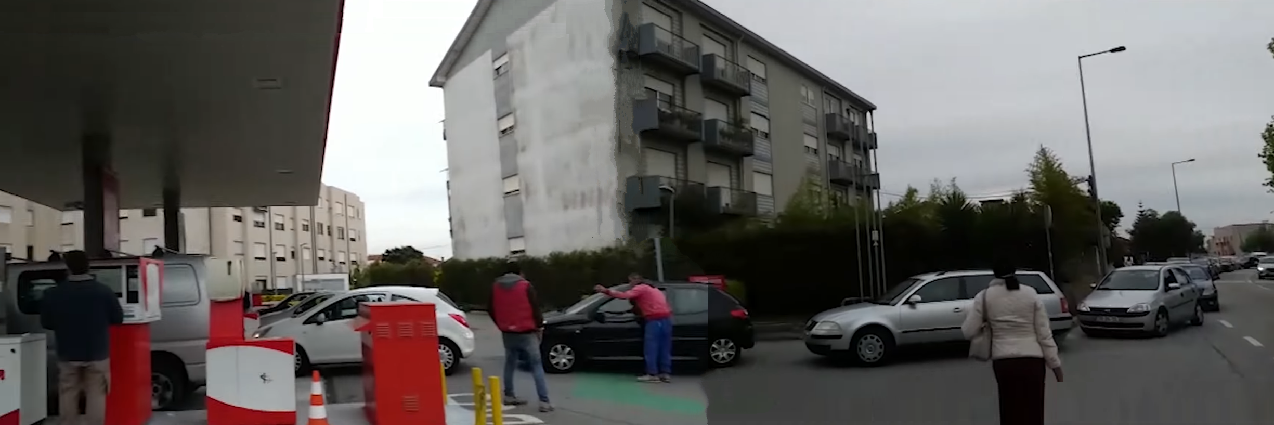
- Queue for a petrol station during the strike
- Date: 15–18 April 2019
- Location: Portugal
- Methods: Strike action

Parties
Sindicato Nacional de Motoristas de Matérias Perigosas (SNMMP, the National Union of Hazardous Goods Transporters)	Government of Portugal; Ministry of the Environment and Energy Transition Ministry of Internal Administration

Lead figures
Francisco São Bento (President); Pedro Pardal Henriques (Vice-President)	António Costa; João Pedro Matos Fernandes; Eduardo Cabrita

The 2019 Portuguese fuel-tanker drivers' strike was a strike action staged by truck drivers transporting hazardous goods, namely fuel, protesting low pay as well as demanding the recognition of their specific professional category. The strike, which started on 15 April was planned to go on "indefinitely" until it was called off on 18 April, causing major disruption and leading the Portuguese Government to announce an "energy crisis" and announce extraordinary measures.

== The strike ==
On 15 April, the National Union of Hazardous Goods Transporters (Sindicato Nacional de Motoristas de Matérias Perigosas, SNMMP) went on strike; by the following day, the international airports of Lisbon and Faro are forced to resort to their emergency supplies, and hundreds of filling stations across the country experience a shortage of fuel — with many reports of crowds rushing to buy fuel.

On 16 April, the Government issued a civil requisition of the workers on strike, having considered that they were not meeting the essential services previously agreed on, namely, the normal supply of fuel to infrastructures like hospitals, fire stations, airports, and 40% of the filling stations within the Lisbon and Porto Metropolitan Areas. On 17 April, about 1200 filling stations (40% of those in the country) were either shut down or were out of stock, and some public transportation services had to be suppressed, namely some Transportes Sul do Tejo buses. Due to the exceptional circumstances, the Government went as far as to enforce fuel rationing (a maximum allowed of 15 liters per vehicle).

The strike was called off after three days, in the morning of 18 April, after negotiations that took the best part of that night. A further 3 to 7 days of disruption in the supply of fuel was expected throughout the country even after the end of the strike action, possibly worsened due to the proximity of two public holidays, Good Friday and Easter Sunday, which fell on 19 and 21 April, respectively.
