= André Ventura =

Portuguese politician (born 1983)

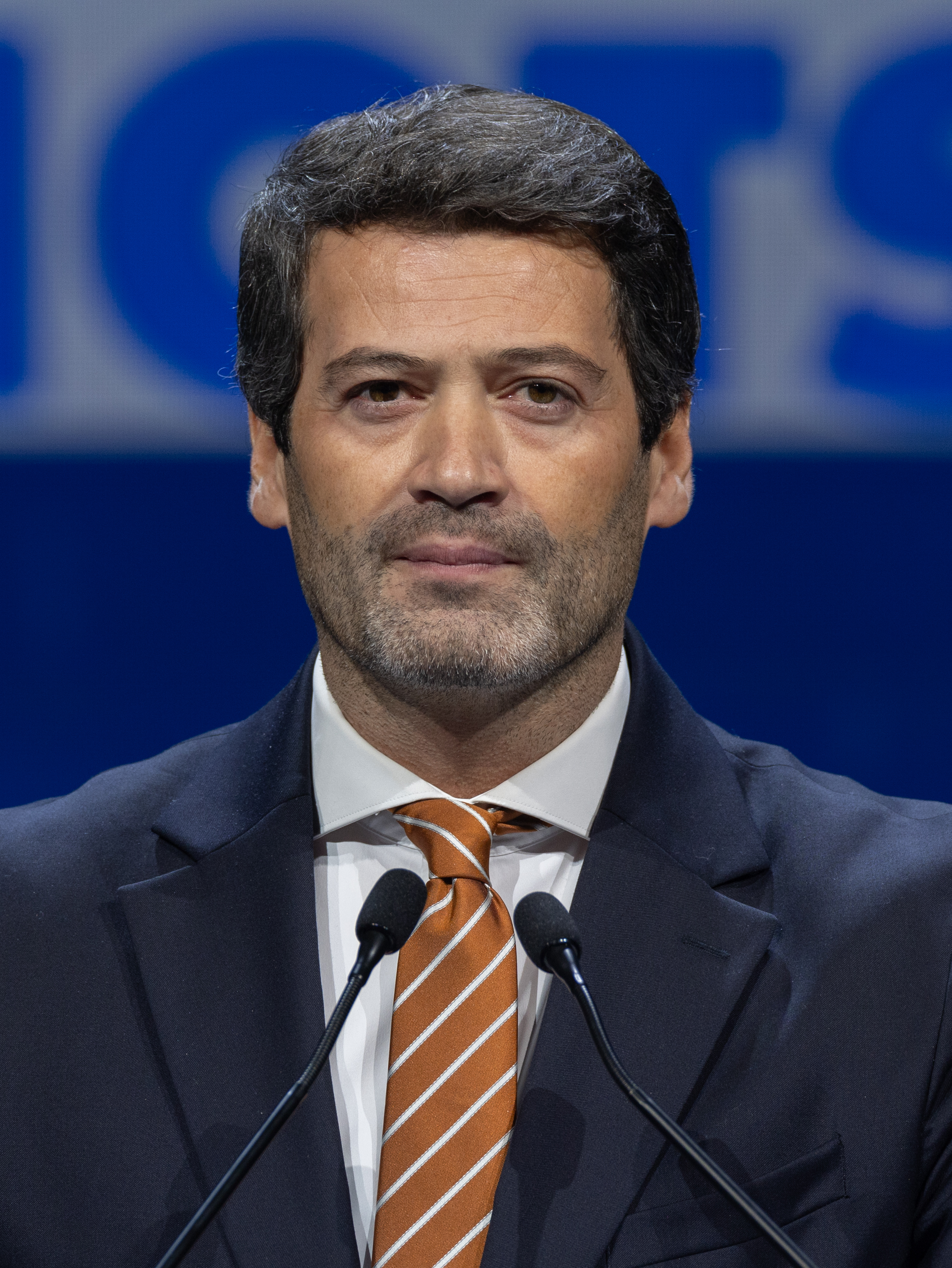
- Ventura in 2025

Leader of the Opposition
- Incumbent
- Assumed office 3 June 2025
- Prime Minister: Luís Montenegro
- Preceded by: Pedro Nuno Santos; Carlos César (acting)

President of Chega
- Incumbent
- Assumed office 9 April 2019
- Preceded by: Party established

Member of the Assembly of the Republic
- Incumbent
- Assumed office 25 October 2019
- Constituency: Lisbon

Member of the Council of State
- Incumbent
- Assumed office 19 June 2024
- Appointed by: Assembly of the Republic
Other offices
Member of the Moura Municipal Assembly
In office
26 September 2021 – 12 October 2025
Member of the Loures City Council
In office
23 October 2017 – 26 October 2018

Personal details
- Born: André Claro Amaral Ventura; 15 January 1983 (age 43) Sintra, Lisbon, Portugal
- Party: Chega (since 2019)
- Other political affiliations: Social Democratic Party (2001–2018)
- Spouse: Dina Marques Nunes (m. 2016)
- Relatives: Rui Gomes da Silva (godfather)
- Education: NOVA University Lisbon; University College Cork
- Occupation: Politician

André Claro Amaral Ventura (Portuguese pronunciation: [ɐ̃ˈdɾɛ vẽˈtuɾɐ]; born 15 January 1983) is a Portuguese politician and founder of the far-right political party Chega. He is the leader of the opposition since Portugal's 2025 legislative election.

Ventura was affiliated with the Social Democratic Party (PSD) until 2018, having run for Mayor of Loures in 2017 as the PSD candidate. He founded the political party Chega in April 2019 and six months later was elected to the Assembly of the Republic in the October 2019 legislative election. In 2021, he ran for President of Portugal, coming third in the election with 11.9% of the votes. In the 2024 Portuguese legislative election, Chega, under his leadership, received 18.1% of the vote, more than quadrupling its seat count to a final total of 50. A year later in the 2025 Portuguese legislative election, Chega's vote total rose to 22.8% of the vote and the party won 60 seats, overtaking the Socialist Party for second place.

== Early life and education ==
Ventura is the son of the owner of a small local bicycle shop, and an office worker. He is a native of Algueirão–Mem Martins, Sintra, a suburban locality in the Lisbon metropolitan area. Unlike his peers, he was not raised in a religion because his parents wanted him to choose his own. At 14, he became an enthusiastic Catholic, was baptised, and made his first communion and confirmation. He wanted to be a priest and attended the Penafirme Seminary, the minor seminary of the Patriarchate of Lisbon, but said he did not continue his ecclesiastical formation because he fell in love. He graduated in law from the Law Faculty of NOVA University Lisbon, with a grade of 19 out of 20. As a law student he took part in the ERASMUS Programme in Salamanca, Spain.

He published two novels, Montenegro in 2008, and A Última Madrugada do Islão ("The Last Dawn of Islam") in 2009, both with significant elements of female submission and homoeroticism. Notably, in Montenegro, the Arabic word for uprising (intifada) is used four times: three times as a metaphor for strength and courage, and once when describing the act of sexual penetration. The publication of A Última Madrugada do Islão, a novel about the death of Yasser Arafat, was suspended by the publishers, Chiado Editora, for its "incendiary potential", for its gratuitous references to Muhammad and the leaders of the Palestine Liberation Organization.

In 2013, he finished his PhD thesis in public law from the Faculty of Law, University College Cork, Ireland, with a scholarship from the Portuguese national science foundation, the Foundation for Science and Technology. In the thesis, he criticised "criminal populism" and "stigmatisation of minorities", and revealed concern about the "expansion of police powers". In a 2019 interview to Diário de Notícias addressing the apparent contradictions between the issues raised in his PhD thesis and his later political views, Ventura said he has "always made a distinction between science and opinion" and called his thesis "scientific analysis, not ideological postulate".

== Career ==
He taught at the Autonomous University of Lisbon, from 2013 to 2019, and at NOVA, from 2016 to 2018. He worked at Caiado Guerreiro, a prominent Portuguese law firm, from 2018 to 2019, and was a consultant at Finpartner, a tax advising firm, for 9 months until 2020. He also had a column in the newspaper Correio da Manhã, the most widely read daily newspaper in the country, and, from 2014 to 2020, was a football commentator representing S.L. Benfica's point of view on the TV channel CMTV. He is also a jurist-consultant of the Tax Authority (AT) where he was employed from 2011 to 2014. As a Portuguese civil servant, he was granted leave from AT without pay since 2014 to teach and ultimately offer tax consultancy and advisory services in the private sector, and had also previously enjoyed the right to be absent from his workplace in the public sector due to his student-worker status as an international doctoral student until 2013.

In an interview in July 2017, in response to Ventura's statements about Portuguese Romani people, José Pinto Coelho (leader of far-right and previously named National Renewal Party) wrote that "unfortunately, it seems, some of 'my people' are still in the parties of the system". In another, Ventura said that he "vehemently repudiates the support of the far-right". In the course of the same campaign, Ventura made several controversial statements about the Romani community in the municipality of Loures, having become the target of a criminal complaint presented by the opposing candidate from the Left Bloc, Fabian Figueiredo. He was accused by Pinto Coelho of stealing the speech from the National Renewal Party. In October 2017, Ventura stated that he was ready to dispute the leadership of the PSD, in case nobody else advanced against Rui Rio.

On 9 April 2019, he founded the political party Chega, and three days later he joined the Basta! coalition for the 2019 European Parliamentary Elections. Failing to elect any MEP, the coalition was dissolved on 30 July 2019. He ran in the 2019 Portuguese legislative elections as the main candidate of Chega's electoral list for the Lisbon constituency; he was the party's first and single member to be elected to Parliament. He claims to have positions that are "economically liberal, culturally nationalist and conservative in matters of customs".

== Member of the Assembly of the Republic ==
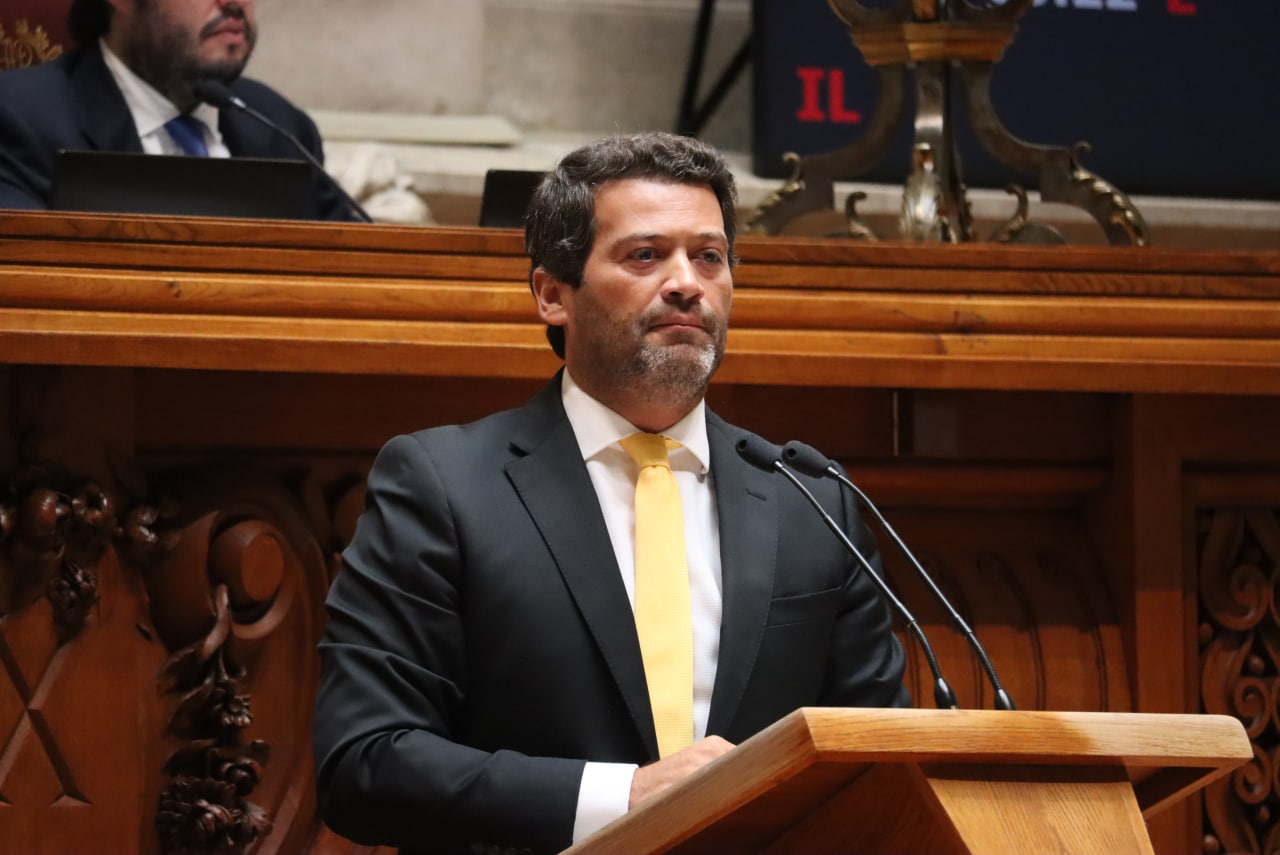
Ventura in the Assembly of the Republic

André Ventura was elected a member of the Assembly of the Republic for the Lisbon constituency in the 2019 Portuguese legislative election. He claims to be "the voice of common people" and an "anti-system politician". In September 2020, he presented a proposal to decrease the number of deputies from 230 to 100, which was ruled unconstitutional by the Committee on Constitutional Affairs, Rights, Freedoms and Guarantees. In November, he renounces these proposals to accompany the PSD. In January 2020, he proposed a 5 to 7.5% decrease in Members' salaries.

He provoked an outcry in Parliament in January 2020 by proposing that Joacine Katar Moreira, an Assembly member born in Guinea Bissau who said that museum items from Portugal's former colonies be returned, be similarly "returned to her country of origin".

Ventura was present at a Zero Movement protest in front of the Assembly. The Zero Movement is an unofficial police union that has been accused of political links to Ventura's party. The only politician to speak, he did so allegedly without an invitation from union leaders. He received a shower of applause.

In November 2020, he was fined more than €400 for discrimination against Romani communities. In December of the same year, he was ordered to pay €3,370 for ethnic discrimination in the form of harassment. Ventura, later in a press conference at the Assembly of the Republic, stated that he would not pay the fine: "to limit the freedom of expression of a citizen, a deputy of the nation and a political leader".

Ventura criticised the Minister of Justice, Francisca Van Dunem, for the release of prisoners to ease COVID-19 transmissions, saying that the measure was an "infamy".

Ventura criticised the state of emergency decree of 17 December 2020, saying:

"This is not really a state of emergency. It is a state of chaos over a state of chaos, which is destroying the lives of the Portuguese people without planning, that the only thing they have to give to the country is a Director of Health who says to have breakfast at Christmas and [this] will solve your problems."

On 22 December 2020, Ventura requested the temporary suspension of his term in the Assembly to run in the 2021 Portuguese presidential election but this suspension was prevented by the Parliament on 29 December. On 31 December, after the decision of the majority of the parliamentary groups not to authorise the suspension of mandate, Ventura advanced with a subpoena against the Assembly of the Republic and Ferro Rodrigues, the Speaker of the Assembly of the Republic, in the Supreme Administrative Court of Portugal.

== Presidential campaigns ==
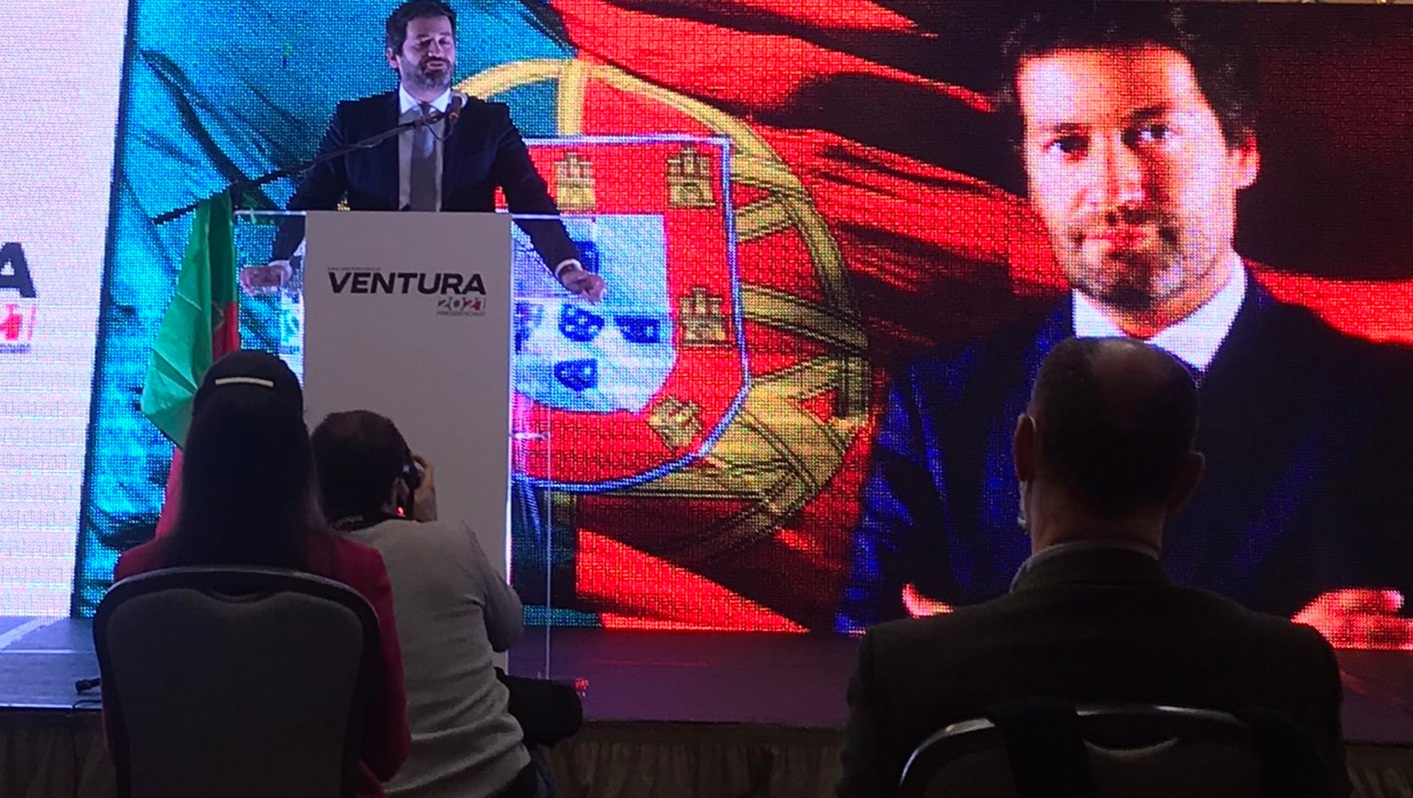
Ventura's speech during election night of the 2021 presidential election

=== 2021 ===
On 8 February 2020, in Portalegre, Ventura announced his candidacy for the office of President of the Republic in the 2021 election.

Ventura invited actress Maria Vieira to be his campaign chair (mandatária) for the Portuguese communities abroad and chose Patrícia Sousa Uva (ex-member of Chega) to be the national director. Subsequently, with the resignation of the latter, Ventura invited Rui Paulo Sousa, 7th member of the national board, to become the national campaign director.

On 18 December 2020, Ventura handed 10,250 signatures of proponents to the Constitutional Court, as legally required to formalise his candidacy for Belém Palace. On 30 December, his candidacy was formally accepted by the Constitutional Court.

At the beginning of the electoral campaign, the president of the French National Rally party, Marine Le Pen, confirmed that she would go to Lisbon to support Ventura's presidential candidacy.

In a televised debate against incumbent Marcelo Rebelo de Sousa, Ventura showed a photograph of the president in the Bairro da Jamaica, a poor and largely black neighborhood in Amora, Setúbal District, where there had been tensions with the police. He accused the president of not being truly right-wing, and called the black residents in the photograph "bandits". In September 2021, a Portuguese court convicted Ventura for social segregation in the aftermath of these events related to Bairro da Jamaica.

Ventura came third with 11.9% of the vote, behind Marcelo Rebelo de Sousa (60.7%) and the Socialist Party’s Ana Gomes (12.9%).

=== 2026 ===
Ventura placed second in the first round 2026 Portuguese presidential election on 18 January with 23.5% of the vote and was defeated by António José Seguro from the Socialist Party in a runoff on 8 February.

== Political views ==
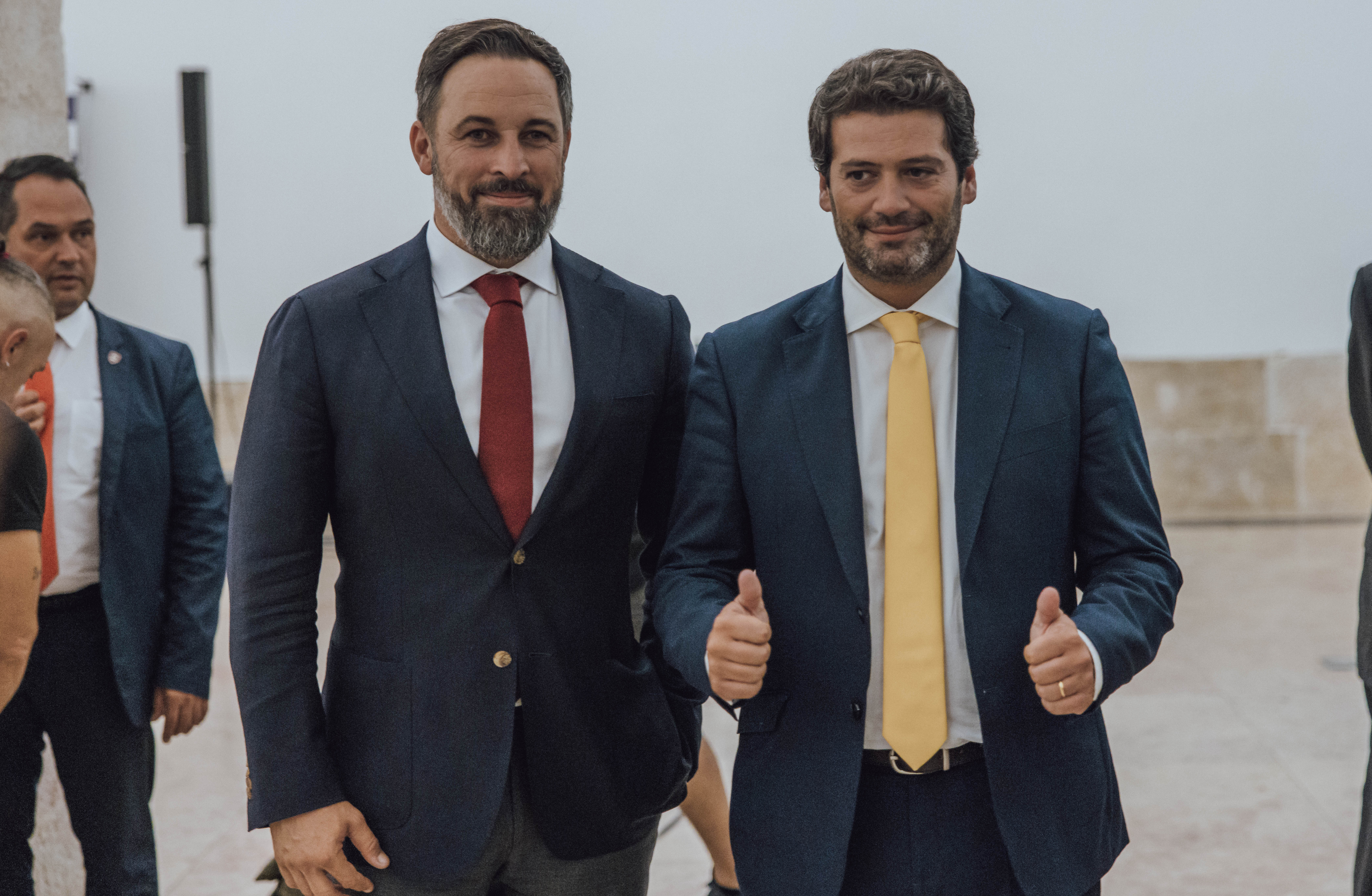
Spanish Vox’s Santiago Abascal and Chega leader André Ventura in Lisbon, 2021

Ventura has expressed controversial views in the past, whilst the majority of international media refer to his ideology as being far-right. Ventura categorizes himself as an "economic liberal, nationalist and conservative". Many of his statements on social issues are said to be anti-Romani, Islamophobic, xenophobic and sexist by the news media. In a TV debate in 2024, Luís Montenegro called Ventura "xenophobic, racist and demagogic".

About António de Oliveira Salazar, Portuguese dictator during the Estado Novo regime, André Ventura said: "The Republic led by Dr. António de Oliveira Salazar, for most of the time, also didn't solve [the country's problems] and set us back a long way in various aspects. It didn't allow us to have the development that we could have had, especially in the post-World War II framework. Portugal could have developed extraordinarily well and we fell behind, just like the Spaniards".

Under Ventura's leadership, the Chega party has been the target of critics who underline the party's extreme views on various subjects, some of which include the negative comments regarding immigration and minorities, namely the Romani and some black communities subjected to ghettoization living in problematic neighborhoods associated with high crime rates that Ventura described at one time as bandits and for which he was convicted by the courts of justice. Ventura's comments on Romani people are often described as racist and xenophobic.

Ventura (far left side) with other right-wing European leaders during the Patriots.eu 2025 summit.

On being compared negatively to Donald Trump and Jair Bolsonaro, Ventura responded "I am very accustomed to that and it doesn't worry me. These are the ideas that I believe in. In addition to life imprisonment and chemical castration, I also want a reduction in Islamic migration, especially from countries known for terrorism". Ventura attended Trump's January 2025 inauguration and has embraced the support of Bolsonaro.

Ventura supports some rights for gay people, but he believes that same-sex couples should be in civil partnerships and not marriages. He is personally opposed to abortion, but does not want the procedure to be criminalised for women. He supports the legalisation and regularisation of prostitution as a way to protect and integrate sex workers. However, he believes that legalisation of recreational drugs increases drug traffic. He is personally opposed to bullfighting, but opposes its sudden abolition due to the economic role it plays in some towns.

In May 2020, during the COVID-19 pandemic in Portugal, Ventura proposed a specific containment plan for the Romani community. He was lambasted for this proposal by professional footballer Ricardo Quaresma, of Romani descent. In June 2020, Ventura organised a counter-protest the day after anti-racist concentrations were announced in honour of actor Bruno Candé, victim of a premeditated homicide. This counter-protest was made under the motto "Portugal is not racist", denying the allegation of racism in Portugal and condemning the "politically correct" associations and affirming that the counter-protest "is a manifestation of everything but white supremacy".

He has spoken in admiration of Mariano Rajoy, conservative former prime minister of Spain. Ventura signed the Madrid Charter, a document drafted by the Spanish party Vox that describes far left-wing groups as enemies of Ibero-America involved in a "criminal project" that are "under the umbrella of the Cuban regime". On 24 February 2022, Twitter permanently suspended Ventura's account for violating the rules of the social network regarding the "conduct of propagating hate". Shortly after, the suspension of his account was lifted.

Changing and evolving the focus of his speech, Ventura has expressed views in which he says that he does not want immigrants unable to integrate and dedicated to a life of marginalization and economic deprivation for themselves and their children, perpetuating cycles of poverty and crime, and constraining the Portuguese welfare state, the national health service, the security forces, wages and housing in the country.

== Personal life ==
André Ventura is married to Dina Marques Nunes Ventura, a children's physiotherapist at a hospital in Lisbon, who met André Ventura after he had left law school at the Universidade Nova de Lisboa. They are childless but he wants to be a father someday.

Mário Rui Leal Pedras, a priest of the Lisbon Patriarchate in the churches of São Nicolau and Santa Maria Madalena, located in Lisbon's Baixa Pombalina, who celebrated the Catholic wedding of Ventura, is his confessor and spiritual director since when Ventura was still a university student. In 2025, Ventura said his path had been guided by a "divine mission".

He is a supporter of S.L. Benfica.

Ventura spoke in 2024 of Matteo Salvini being "a very good friend" and of having "a great relation" with Geert Wilders.

== Electoral history ==
=== Loures City Council election, 2017 ===
Ballot: 1 October 2017
Party	Candidate	Votes	%	Seats	+/−
CDU	Bernardino Soares	28,701	32.8	4	–1
PS	Sónia Paixão	24,737	28.2	4	±0
PSD/PPM	André Ventura	18,877	21.5	3	+1
BE	Fabian Figueiredo	3,107	3.5	0	±0
CDS–PP	Pedro Pestana Bastos	2,508	2.9	0	±0
PCTP/MRPP	João Resa	2,232	2.5	0	±0
PAN	Ana Sofia da Silva	1,824	2.1	1	new
Other parties		1,452	1.7	0	±0
Blank/Invalid ballots		4,162	4.8	–	–
Turnout		87,600	52.31	11	±0
Source: Autárquicas 2017

=== European Parliament election, 2019 ===
Ballot: 26 May 2019
Party	Candidate	Votes	%	Seats	+/−
PS	Pedro Marques	1,104,694	33.4	9	+1
PSD	Paulo Rangel	725,399	21.9	6	±0
BE	Marisa Matias	325,093	9.8	2	+1
CDU	João Ferreira	228,045	6.9	2	–1
CDS–PP	Nuno Melo	204,792	6.2	1	±0
PAN	Francisco Guerreiro	168,015	5.1	1	+1
Alliance	Paulo Sande	61,652	1.9	0	new
Livre	Rui Tavares	60,446	1.8	0	±0
Basta!	André Ventura	49,388	1.5	0	new
NC	Paulo de Morais	34,634	1.1	0	new
Other parties		116,743	2.7	0	±0
Blank/Invalid ballots		235,748	3.5	–	–
Turnout		3,307,644	30.75	21	±0
Source: Comissão Nacional de Eleições

=== Legislative election, 2019 ===
Ballot: 6 October 2019
Party	Candidate	Votes	%	Seats	+/−
PS	António Costa	1,903,687	36.3	108	+22
PSD	Rui Rio	1,454,283	27.8	79	–10
BE	Catarina Martins	498,549	9.5	19	±0
CDU	Jerónimo de Sousa	332,018	6.3	12	–5
CDS–PP	Assunção Cristas	221,094	4.2	5	–13
PAN	André Silva	173,931	3.3	4	+3
Chega	André Ventura	67,502	1.3	1	new
IL	Carlos Guimarães Pinto	67,443	1.3	1	new
Livre	Joacine Katar Moreira	56,940	1.1	1	+1
Other parties		207,162	4.0	0	±0
Blank/Invalid ballots		254,875	4.9	–	–
Turnout		5,237,484	48.60	230	±0
Source: Comissão Nacional de Eleições

=== Presidential election, 2021 ===
Ballot: 24 January 2021
Candidate	Votes	%
Marcelo Rebelo de Sousa	2,531,692	60.7
Ana Gomes	540,823	13.0
André Ventura	497,746	11.9
João Ferreira	179,764	4.3
Marisa Matias	165,127	4.0
Tiago Mayan Gonçalves	134,991	3.2
Vitorino Silva	123,031	3.0
Blank/Invalid ballots	85,182	–
Turnout	4,258,356	39.26
Source: Comissão Nacional de Eleições

=== Chega leadership election, 2021 ===
Ballot: 6 November 2021
Candidate	Votes	%
André Ventura	~3,800	94.8
Carlos Natal	~200	5.2
Turnout	~4,000	~20.00

=== Legislative election, 2022 ===
Ballot: 30 January 2022
Party	Candidate	Votes	%	Seats	+/−
PS	António Costa	2,302,601	41.4	120	+12
PSD	Rui Rio	1,618,381	29.1	77	–2
Chega	André Ventura	399,659	7.2	12	+11
IL	João Cotrim Figueiredo	273,687	4.9	8	+7
BE	Catarina Martins	244,603	4.4	5	–14
CDU	Jerónimo de Sousa	238,920	4.3	6	–6
CDS–PP	Rodrigues dos Santos	89,181	1.6	0	–5
PAN	Inês Sousa Real	88,152	1.6	1	–3
Livre	Rui Tavares	71,232	1.3	1	±0
Other parties		91,299	1.6	0	±0
Blank/Invalid ballots		146,824	2.6	–	–
Turnout		5,564,539	51.46	230	±0
Source: Comissão Nacional de Eleições

=== Legislative election, 2024 ===
Ballot: 10 March 2024
Party	Candidate	Votes	%	Seats	+/−
AD	Luís Montenegro	1,867,442	28.8	80	+3
PS	Pedro Nuno Santos	1,812,443	28.0	78	–42
Chega	André Ventura	1,169,781	18.1	50	+38
IL	Rui Rocha	319,877	4.9	8	±0
BE	Mariana Mortágua	282,314	4.4	5	±0
CDU	Paulo Raimundo	205,551	3.2	4	–2
Livre	Rui Tavares	204,875	3.2	4	+3
PAN	Inês Sousa Real	126,125	2.0	1	±0
ADN	Bruno Fialho	102,134	1.6	0	±0
Other parties		104,167	1.6	0	±0
Blank/Invalid ballots		282,243	4.4	–	–
Turnout		6,476,952	59.90	230	±0
Source: Comissão Nacional de Eleições

=== Legislative election, 2025 ===
Ballot: 18 May 2025
Party	Candidate	Votes	%	Seats	+/−
AD	Luís Montenegro	2,008,488	31.8	91	+11
PS	Pedro Nuno Santos	1,442,546	22.8	58	–20
Chega	André Ventura	1,438,554	22.8	60	+10
IL	Rui Rocha	338,974	5.4	9	+1
Livre	Rui Tavares	257,291	4.1	6	+2
CDU	Paulo Raimundo	183,686	2.9	3	–1
BE	Mariana Mortágua	125,808	2.0	1	–4
PAN	Inês Sousa Real	86,930	1.4	1	±0
ADN	Bruno Fialho	81,660	1.3	0	±0
Other parties		95,384	1.5	1	+1
Blank/Invalid ballots		260,648	4.1	–	–
Turnout		6,319,969	58.25	230	±0
Source: Comissão Nacional de Eleições

=== Presidential election, 2026 ===
Ballot: 18 January and 8 February 2026
Candidate	First round		Second round	
Candidate	Votes	%	Votes	%
António José Seguro	1,755,563	31.1	3,502,613	66.8
André Ventura	1,327,021	23.5	1,737,950	33.2
João Cotrim de Figueiredo	903,057	16.0		
Henrique Gouveia e Melo	695,377	12.3		
Luís Marques Mendes	637,442	11.3		
Catarina Martins	116,407	2.1		
António Filipe	92,644	1.6		
Manuel João Vieira	60,927	1.1		
Jorge Pinto	38,588	0.7		
André Pestana	10,897	0.2		
Humberto Correia	4,773	0.1		
Blank/Invalid ballots	125,840	–	275,414	–
Turnout	5,768,536	52.39	5,515,977	50.03
Source: Comissão Nacional de Eleições

== Books ==
- Introdução à Fiscalidade, e-book, Lisboa (2017)
- Justiça, Corrupção e Jornalismo (co-authored with Miguel Fernandes), Vida Económica (2015)
- A Nova Justiça Internacional, Chiado Editora, Lisboa (2015)
- A Nova Administração Pública (inclui a nova Lei Geral do Trabalho em Funções Públicas anotada), Quid Juris, Lisboa (2014)
- A Reforma do IRC (com António Carlos dos Santos), Vida Económica, Lisboa (2014)
- Lições de Direito Fiscal, Chiado Editora, Lisboa (2014)
- Lições de Direito Penal, Volume I, UAL / Instituto de Direito Publico / Chiado Editora (2013), Montenegro, com 2.ª ed. revista, pela Chiado Editora, Lisboa (2008)
- A Última Madrugada do Islão, Chiado Editora, Lisboa (2009)

Political offices
Preceded by Pedro Nuno Santos	Leader of the Opposition; 2025–present	Incumbent
Party political offices
New political party	President of Chega; 2019–present	Incumbent
