= TeamBackpack =

TeamBackpack is a music movement created in San Francisco by Armani Cooper, Dev Tejwani, and Nelson Silva. Since its early days, TeamBackpack has held cypher events in which underground & independent emcees rap a verse over originally produced beats, all in one take. With three to four people on a beat, these sessions are filmed live. Past cyphers featured artists such as Hopsin, Cyhi da Prynce, Joell Ortiz, Krizz Kaliko, Denzil Porter, Dizzy Wright and Rapsody.

On June 7, 2018, TeamBackPack, in conjunction with World Underground announced their inaugural World Underground Festival. The festival is scheduled for August 29 to 31, 2018.

World Underground Festival
Year	Headliners	Venue
2018	Raekwon, Ghostface Killah, Dave East, Azealia Banks, Oshun, G.L.A.M, Radamiz, Siimba, Marlon Craft, Coco Mamba, Locksmith, Chris Rivers, Skull N Tones and more.	Melrose Ballroom, NYC.

== Past Events/Collaborations ==
- Rock The Bells, 2013
- A3C, 2013 & 2014
- Hunger Pains Tour, 2014
- Mission Underground LA (MULA), 2014
- Mission Underground LA (MULA), 2015
- Mission Underground NY (MUNY), 2016
