= 2025 Portuguese legislative election =

- 18 May 2025

All 230 seats in the Assembly of the Republic 116 seats needed for a majority
- Opinion polls
- Registered: 10,848,816 ▲0.3%
- Turnout: 6,319,969 (58.3%) ▼1.6 pp
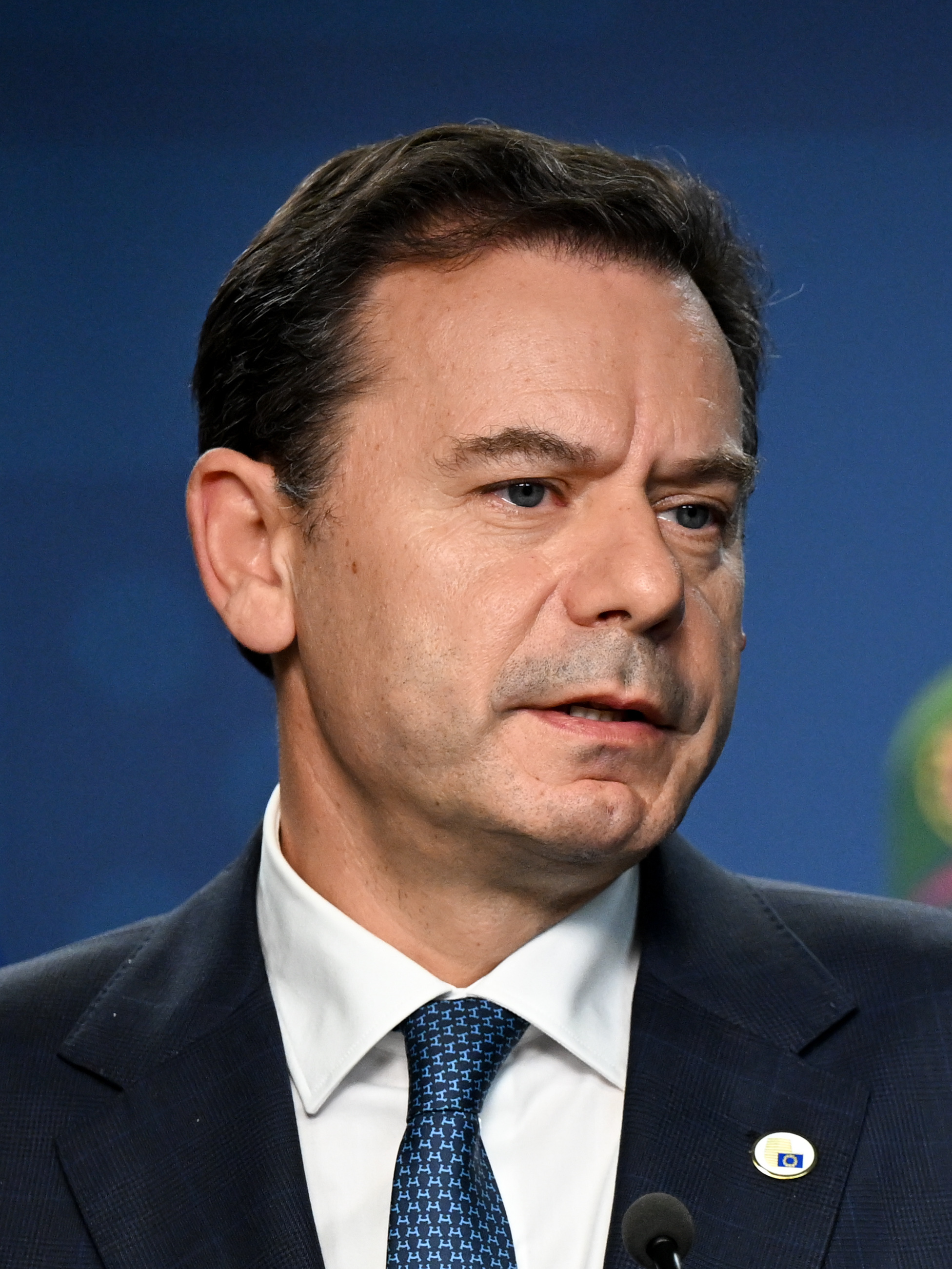

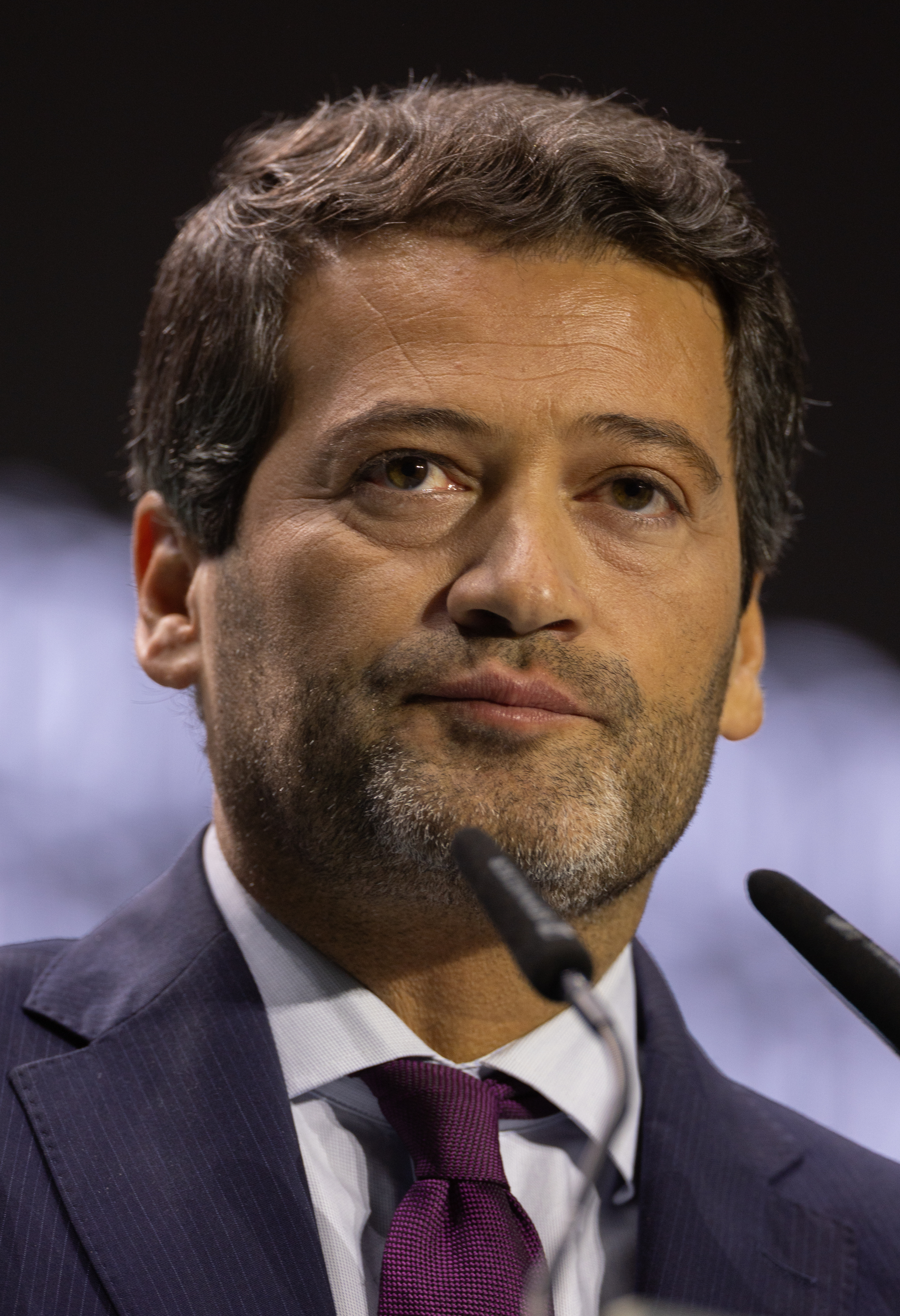

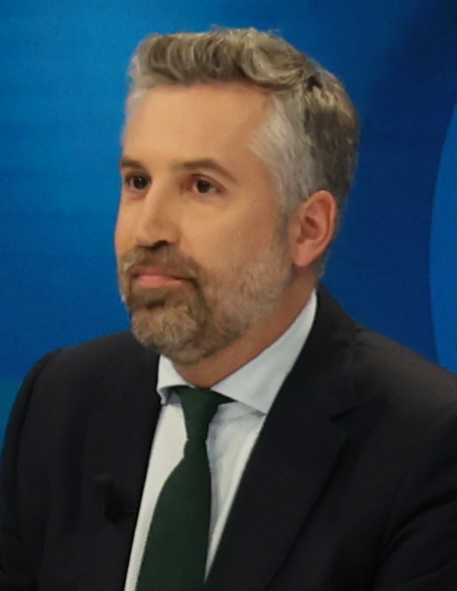

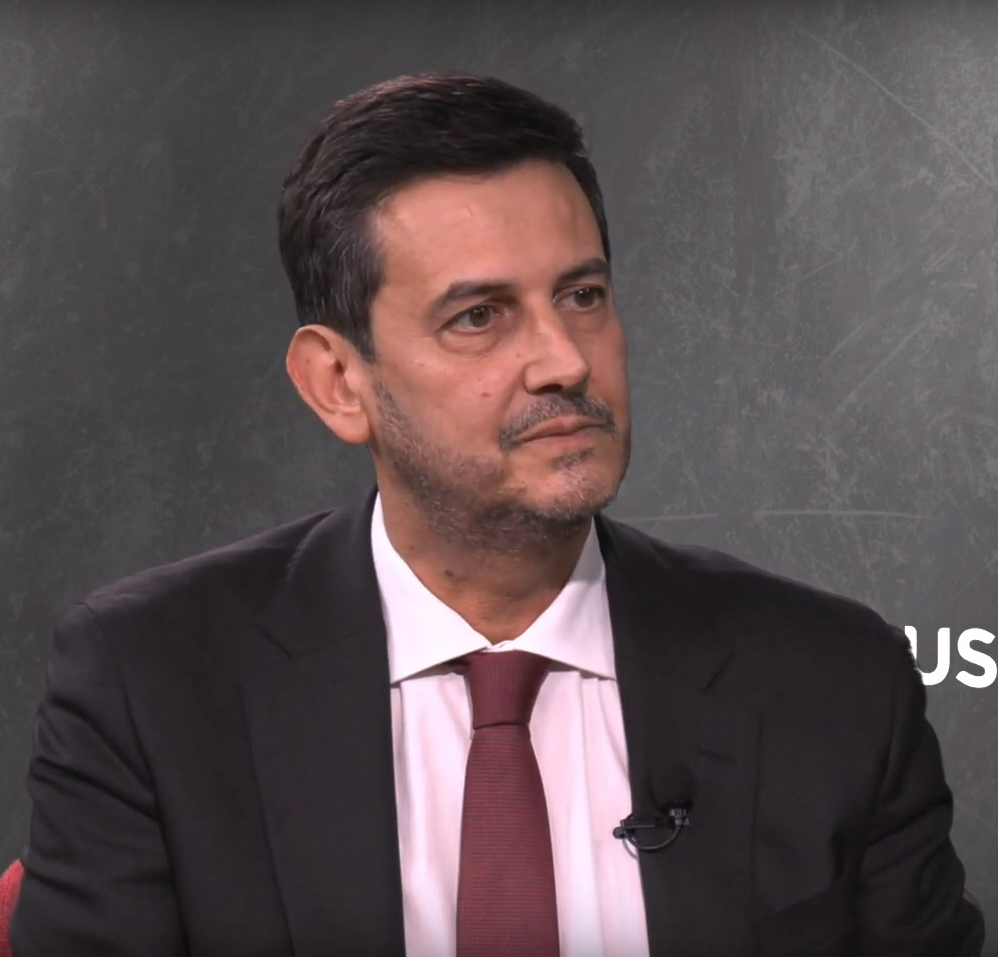

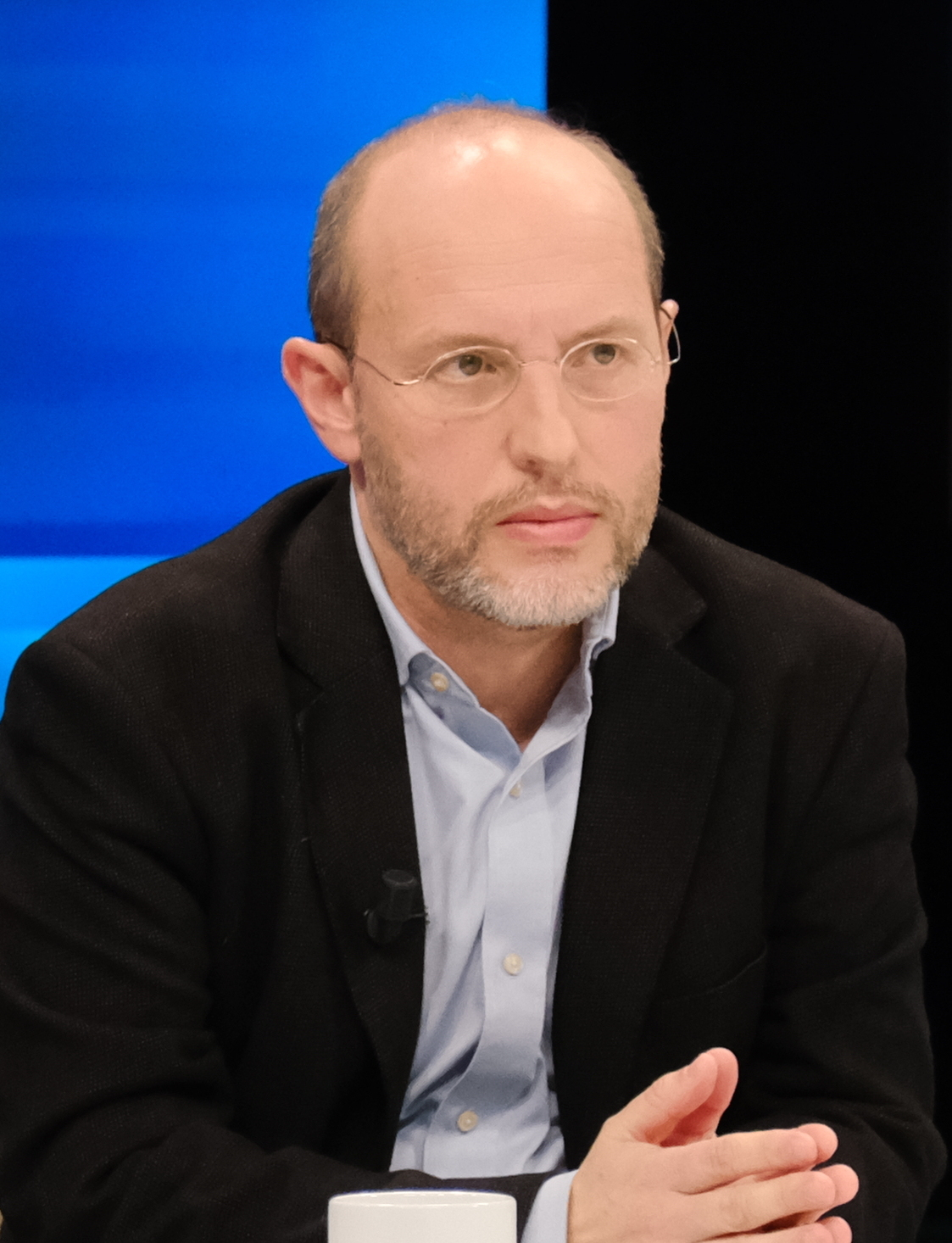

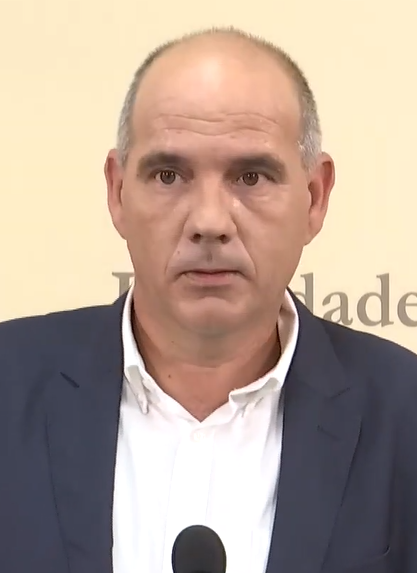

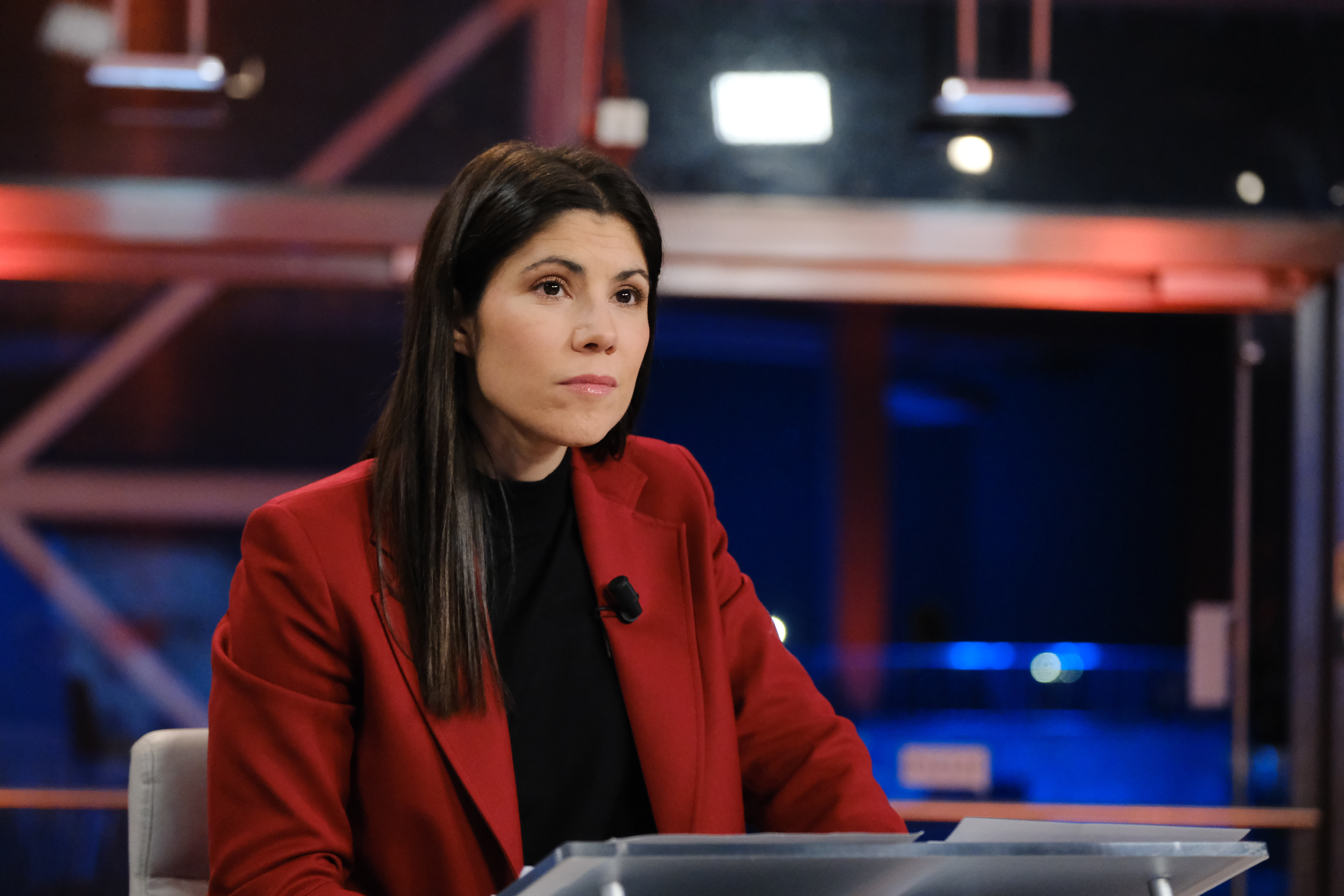

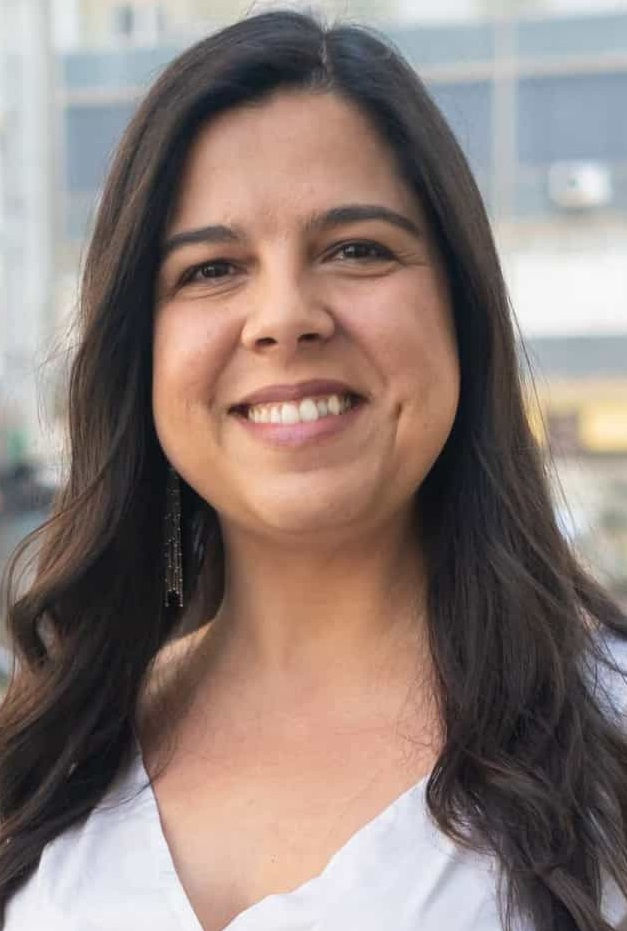

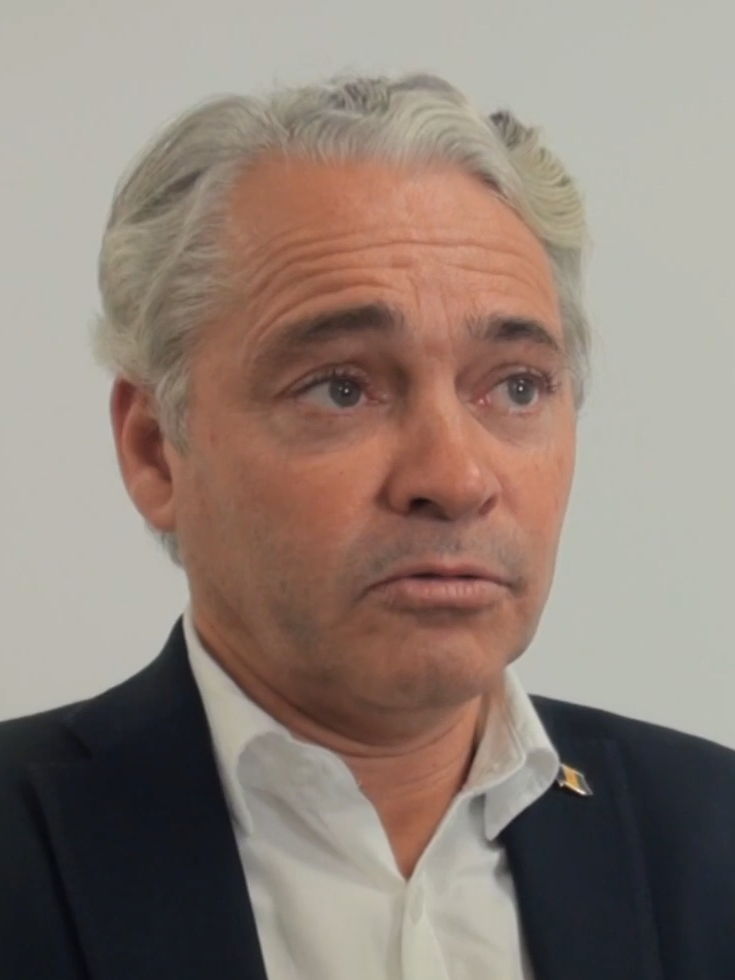
	First party	Second party	Third party
Leader	Luís Montenegro	André Ventura	Pedro Nuno Santos
Party	PSD	CH	PS
Alliance	AD
Leader since	28 May 2022 (Note: As leader of the Social Democratic Party (PSD).)	9 April 2019	16 December 2023
Leader's seat	Aveiro (Note: In the 2024 election, Luís Montenegro was elected in the district of Lisbon.)	Lisbon	Aveiro
Last election	80 seats, 28.8% (Note: The Social Democratic Party (PPD/PSD), the CDS - People's Party (CDS-PP) and the People's Monarchist Party (PPM) contested the 2024 election in a coalition called Democratic Alliance (AD) and won a combined 28.8% of the vote and elected 80 MPs to parliament. 78 of the MPs elected in 2024 are from PPD/PSD, while CDS-PP elected 2. PPM did not elect any MPs.)	50 seats, 18.1%	78 seats, 28.0%
Seats won	91	60	58
Seat change	▲11	▲10	▼20
Popular vote	2,008,488 (Note: Sum of votes between the PSD/CDS–PP lists in mainland Portugal and Madeira with the PSD/CDS–PP/PPM list in the Azores.)	1,438,554	1,442,546
Percentage	31.8%	22.8%	22.8%
Swing	▲2.9 pp	▲4.7 pp	▼5.2 pp
	Fourth party	Fifth party	Sixth party
Leader	Rui Rocha	Rui Tavares (Note: LIVRE has no formal single leader; the party has a 15-member leadership committee of which Rui Tavares serves as co-spokesperson.)	Paulo Raimundo
Party	IL	LIVRE	PCP
Alliance			CDU
Leader since	22 January 2023	12 May 2024	12 November 2022
Leader's seat	Braga	Lisbon	Lisbon
Last election	8 seats, 4.9%	4 seats, 3.2%	4 seats, 3.2% (Note: The Portuguese Communist Party (PCP) and the Ecologist Party "The Greens" (PEV) contested the 2024 election in a coalition called Unitary Democratic Coalition (CDU) and won a combined 3.2% of the vote and elected 4 MPs to parliament. The 4 MPs elected in 2024 are all from PCP. PEV elected zero.)
Seats won	9	6	3
Seat change	▲1	▲2	▼1
Popular vote	338,974	257,291	183,686
Percentage	5.4%	4.1%	2.9%
Swing	▲0.5 pp	▲0.9 pp	▼0.3 pp
	Seventh party	Eighth party	Ninth party
Leader	Mariana Mortágua	Inês Sousa Real	Élvio Sousa
Party	BE	PAN	JPP
Leader since	28 May 2023	6 June 2021	27 January 2015
Leader's seat	Lisbon	Lisbon	Europe (lost)
Last election	5 seats, 4.4%	1 seat, 2.0%	0 seats, 0.3%
Seats won	1	1	1
Seat change	▼4	0	▲1
Popular vote	125,808	86,930	20,900
Percentage	2.0%	1.4%	0.3%
Swing	▼2.4 pp	▼0.6 pp	0.0 pp
Prime Minister before election
Luís Montenegro
PSD
Prime Minister after election
Luís Montenegro
PSD

A snap legislative election took place in Portugal on 18 May 2025 to elect members of the Assembly of the Republic for the 17th Legislature. All 230 seats to the Assembly of the Republic were up for election.

Following allegations of conflicts of interest in relation to the Prime Minister's family business, the incumbent government called a confidence vote, which it lost on 11 March 2025. The President, Marcelo Rebelo de Sousa, then called an election for 18 May: the third legislative election in less than four years.

The centre-right to right-wing Democratic Alliance (AD), led by the incumbent Prime Minister Luís Montenegro, won the largest number of seats. Compared to the 2024 election, the AD increased its vote share to 32%, and received 91 seats. However, this still fell short of the 116 seats required for a majority. The far-right populist party Chega (CH) increased its vote share to nearly 23% and won 60 seats, thus becoming the second largest party in Parliament. The Socialist Party (PS) suffered one of its worst defeats ever, falling to a distant second place with also nearly 23% of the votes and finishing third place in terms of seats with 58.

Turnout in the election was 58.3%, the third highest since 2005, and in Portugal alone, turnout stood at 64.4%, a slight decrease compared with the 66.2% in the previous election in 2024.

== Background ==
The Democratic Alliance (AD), then composed by the Social Democratic Party (PSD), the CDS – People's Party (CDS–PP) and the People's Monarchist Party (PPM), and led by PSD leader Luís Montenegro, won the 2024 legislative election by a very narrow margin, winning almost 29% of the votes and 80 seats in the 230 seat Assembly of the Republic. The Socialist Party (PS), in power between 2015 and 2024 and led by Pedro Nuno Santos, elected in the aftermath of the resignation of then Prime Minister António Costa due to an investigation around alleged corruption involving the award of contracts for lithium and hydrogen businesses, saw a significant decrease in support, winning only 28% of the vote and 78 seats. The populist and far-right party Chega (CH) surged in the elections, gathering 18% of the votes and 50 seats in Parliament, becoming kingmaker with the best result for a third party in decades. The Liberal Initiative (IL) was able to hold on to its eight seats and gather 5% of the vote. The left-wing parties, the Portuguese Communist Party (PCP) and the Left Bloc (BE), achieved, again, disappointing results, with BE holding on to its five seats and 4% of the votes, while the Communists' alliance got its worst result ever with just 3% of the votes and four seats. LIVRE nearly surpassed PCP by gathering also 3% of the votes and four seats. People Animals Nature (PAN) was able to win just one seat.

Eleven days after election day, on 21 March 2024, Luis Montenegro was asked by President of the Republic Marcelo Rebelo de Sousa to form a government, a minority one in this case. The new government took office on 2 April 2024.

=== 2025 budget crisis ===
Despite a sound economic situation, the lack of a workable majority forced the minority AD government to negotiate with opposition parties to pass important legislation, which created problems regarding the prospects for a 2025 budget. The Government decided to negotiate with the Socialist Party (PS), however, the odds of a positive outcome from these negotiations were considered slim, at first, since the PS rejected corporate tax cuts and the proposed "Youth IRS" scheme, which would provide an income tax rate cut for young people under the age of 35, while accusing the government of not giving in. President Marcelo Rebelo de Sousa warned that a lack of a deal could lead to a snap legislative election, and admitted he was putting pressure on both major parties to reach a deal.

On 3 October 2024, Luís Montenegro "dropped" several parts of his government's Youth IRS scheme and corporate tax cuts by bringing his new proposals closer to policies defended by the PS, calling it an "irrefutable proposal" for the Socialists. Pedro Nuno Santos recognized the concessions made by the government, but pressed for more conditions on corporate tax cuts, mainly on their timing. The Prime Minister rejected these last conditions made by the PS, but said he was "confident" in the budget being approved by Parliament.

On 17 October 2024, the general-secretary of PS, Pedro Nuno Santos, announced that the Socialist Party would abstain in the budget vote, thus ensuring the approval of the document with the sole votes of the AD coalition. On 31 October, Parliament passed the budget in its first general reading by an 80–72 vote, with the 78 PS members abstaining. On the final vote, on 29 November 2024, the budget was confirmed by a 79–72 vote, with 77 PS members abstaining.

=== Spinumviva case ===
On 15 February 2025, Correio da Manhã newspaper published an investigation in which it was stated that Prime Minister Luís Montenegro's family had a business with real estate interests, called Spinumviva. Montenegro confirmed the existence of the company, but denied any conflict of interest, saying he had sold his shares to his wife in 2022. Chega criticized the lack of answers from Montenegro and presented a motion of no confidence. This was rejected by Parliament by 171 against to 49 in favour. It was later revealed that Montenegro's sale of his shares to his wife was invalid, as the law does not allow share sales between spouses, thus making Montenegro still an active shareholder of the company. This raised further questions of possible conflicts of interest and Montenegro was strongly pressed to reveal the full list of clients of his business, but he refused to do this.

Two weeks later, on 28 February, Expresso newspaper reported that Spinumviva has been receiving a monthly payment of €4,500 from one of their main clients, Solverde, a casino company, since 2021, which continued while Montenegro was Prime Minister. In the aftermath of this report, Spinumviva also disclosed the full list of clients and the services provided. Parties demanded more explanations from the Prime Minister, with Chega demanding his resignation. On the same day, Montenegro announced an emergency cabinet meeting for 1 March, to "analyze his personal and political situation". He announced that the Government would request a motion of confidence if Parliament did not "validate" the Government. The PCP presented a motion of no confidence but the Socialist Party (PS) opposed this motion. A few days later, the Public Prosecution Service announced that it had received an anonymous tip against Luís Montenegro and his company, initially saying that it was examining the complaint, but later opening a preliminary investigation into the matter, while the Socialist Party announced a Parliamentary inquiry committee to also investigate the case. On 5 March, the Communists' motion was rejected, 88 votes against to 14 in favour, with 126 abstentions, but Luís Montenegro announced a vote of confidence, which was scheduled for 11 March. The Public Prosecutor's Office closed the preliminary investigation, with no charges filed, in December 2025, 9 months after it was opened.

==== Fall of the government ====
The results of the confidence vote: In favour Against Not present

On 11 March 2025, Luís Montenegro's government fell after losing a vote of confidence in Parliament, 137 against with 87 in favour. After the results of the motion were announced, President Marcelo Rebelo de Sousa held meetings with party leaders on 12 March, and a Council of State meeting on 13 March. Later on the same day, 13 March, Rebelo de Sousa announced the dissolution of Parliament and the calling of an election for 18 May 2025.

=== Leadership changes and challenges ===
==== LIVRE ====
On 10 to 12 May 2024, LIVRE held a party congress in order to elect its leadership. Incumbent co-spokesperson Rui Tavares faced a leadership challenge from two motions, one led by Natércia Lopes and the other by João Manso, while his was led by parliamentary leader Isabel Mendes Lopes. Tavares and Mendes Lopes ended up winning with 61% of the votes.

Ballot: 12 May 2024
Candidate	Votes	%
Isabel Mendes Lopes; Rui Tavares	240	60.9
Natércia Lopes	86	21.8
João Manso	56	14.2
Abstention	12	3.0
Turnout	394	
Source: Official results

==== Liberal Initiative ====
On 8 April 2024, former 2021 presidential candidate Tiago Mayan Gonçalves, announced a manifesto called "United by liberalism" and said he would be a candidate for the party's leadership, thus challenging incumbent leader Rui Rocha. On 20 June 2024, Mayan Gonçalves officially launched his bid for the party's leadership. A few months later, after it was revealed that he had forged signatures during his time as Parish President of Aldoar, Foz do Douro e Nevogilde, he dropped out from the leadership race. A leadership convention was scheduled for 1 and 2 February 2025, with party leader Rui Rocha running for another term. After the withdrawal of Mayan Gonçalves, Rui Malheiro, a party councillor, announced his bid against Rocha. On 2 February 2025, during the party's convention held in Loures with 1,545 members registered to vote, Rocha was reelected with more than 73% of the votes:

Ballot: 2 February 2025
Candidate	Votes	%
Rui Rocha	~900	73.4
Rui Malheiro	~300	26.6
Blank/invalid ballots	–	
Turnout	~1,200	~78.00
Source: SIC Notícias

==== Chega ====
Despite facing no challenges to his leadership, André Ventura's re-elections as party leader were deemed invalid by the Constitutional Court, following complaints filed by party members regarding illegal formal and procedural acts, with the party's January 2023 leadership convention being invalidated. In response, a new convention was held in January 2024, but this too was ruled as invalid by the Court in March 2025.

=== Date ===
According to the Portuguese Constitution, an election must be called between 14 September and 14 October of the year that the legislature ends. The election is called by the President of Portugal but is not called at the request of the Prime Minister; however, the President must listen to all of the parties represented in Parliament and the election day must be announced at least 60 days before the election. If an election is called during an ongoing legislature (dissolution of parliament) it must be held at least after 55 days. Election day is the same in all multi-seats constituencies, and should fall on a Sunday or national holiday. In normal circumstances, the next legislative election would, therefore, have taken place no later than 8 October 2028, but it was called early for 18 May 2025.

The President of Portugal has the power to dissolve the Assembly of the Republic by his/her own will. Unlike in other countries, the President can refuse to dissolve the parliament at the request of the Prime Minister or the Assembly of the Republic and all the parties represented in Parliament. If the Prime Minister resigns, the President can appoint a new Prime Minister after listening to all the parties represented in Parliament and then the government program must be subject to discussion by the Assembly of the Republic, whose members of parliament may present a motion to reject the upcoming government, or dissolve Parliament and call new elections.

=== Electoral system ===
The Assembly of the Republic has 230 members elected to four-year terms. There are 22 electoral constituencies, with each having multiple seats depending on the district magnitude listed in the table below (which roughly depends on population). Within each constituency, the seats are allocated to parties based on closed list proportional representation and the d'Hondt method.

In parliamentary confidence votes, only "no" votes are tallied, so a government can be forced out only if at least 116 MPs vote against it. It is therefore possible for a minority government to survive with less than 116 seats, unless the opposition parties unite against it. Nevertheless, a stable coalition government will seek the support of at least 116 MPs.

For the 2025 legislative election, the distribution of seats per constituency was:

Constituency	Number of MPs	Map
Lisbon	48	
Porto	40	
Braga and Setúbal	19 each	
Aveiro	16	
Leiria	10	
Coimbra, Faro and Santarém	9 each	
Viseu	8	
Madeira	6	
Azores, Viana do Castelo and Vila Real	5 each	
Castelo Branco	4	
Beja, Bragança, Évora and Guarda	3 each	
Portalegre, Europe and Outside Europe	2 each	

=== Early voting ===
Voters were also able to vote early, which happened on 11 May, one week before election day. Voters had to register between 4 and 8 May to be eligible to cast an early ballot. By the 8 May deadline, 333,347 voters had requested to vote early, a number well above the 2024 figures and the highest since the option of early voting was extended to all voters. On 11 May, 314,859 voters (94.5% of voters that requested) cast an early ballot, also adding 3,993 early ballots from voters who were hospitalized, imprisoned or outside their usual residence.

== Parties ==
Parties and/or coalitions that intended to run had until 7 April 2025 to file lists of candidates. Unlike in 2024, the AD coalition was only between the Social Democratic Party (PSD) and CDS – People's Party (CDS–PP), with the People's Monarchist Party (PPM) leaving the coalition. The PPM only ran in coalition with PSD/CDS–PP in the Azores constituency.

=== Parliamentary factions ===
The table below lists the parties and/or coalitions represented in the Assembly of the Republic during the 16th legislature (2024–2025) and that also contested the 2025 elections:

Name			Ideology	Political position	Leader	Lists	2024 result		Seats at dissolution
Name			Ideology	Political position	Leader	Lists	%	Seats	Seats at dissolution
AD	PPD/PSD	Social Democratic Party; Partido Social Democrata	Liberal conservatism	Centre-right to right-wing	Luís Montenegro	22	28.8%	78 / 230	78 / 230
AD	CDS–PP	CDS – People's Party; CDS – Partido Popular	Christian democracy Conservatism	Centre-right to right-wing	Nuno Melo	22	28.8%	2 / 230	2 / 230
PS	Socialist Party; Partido Socialista		Social democracy	Centre-left	Pedro Nuno Santos	22	28.0%	78 / 230	78 / 230
CH	Enough! Chega!		National conservatism Right-wing populism	Far-right	André Ventura	22	18.1%	50 / 230	49 / 230
IL	Liberal Initiative; Iniciativa Liberal		Classical liberalism Right-libertarianism	Centre-right to right-wing	Rui Rocha	22	4.9%	8 / 230	8 / 230
BE	Left Bloc; Bloco de Esquerda		Democratic socialism Left-wing populism	Left-wing	Mariana Mortágua	22	4.4%	5 / 230	5 / 230
CDU	PCP	Portuguese Communist Party; Partido Comunista Português	Marxism–Leninism Lassalleanism	Left-wing	Paulo Raimundo	22	3.2%	4 / 230	4 / 230
L	FREE; LIVRE		Green politics Pro-Europeanism	Centre-left to left-wing	Rui Tavares	22	3.2%	4 / 230	4 / 230
PAN	People Animals Nature; Pessoas-Animais-Natureza		Animal welfare Environmentalism	Centre-left (Note: Some sources state that People Animals Nature (PAN) is neither on the left nor the right.)	Inês Sousa Real	21 (Note: Except Viseu.)	2.0%	1 / 230	1 / 230
Ind.	Independent; Independente		Miguel Arruda (left the Enough! caucus)						1 / 230

==== Seat changes ====
- On 23 January 2025, Chega MP Miguel Arruda left the party following accusations, and a police investigation, that he stole several suitcases at Lisbon Airport and at Ponta Delgada Airport and then sold the items from the suitcases on Vinted. Chega demanded the resignation of Arruda from his seat, but he rejected this and decided to remain as an independent.

=== Non-represented parties ===
The table below lists the parties and/or coalitions not represented in the Assembly of the Republic and that also ran in the elections. The Earth Party (MPT) signed a deal supporting the AD – PSD/CDS Coalition, but competed alone in Azores and Madeira.

Name		Ideology	Political position	Leader	Lists	2024 result	Ref.
Name		Ideology	Political position	Leader	Lists	%	Ref.
ADN	National Democratic Alternative; Alternativa Democrática Nacional	Traditionalism; Social conservatism	Far-right	Joana Amaral Dias	22	1.6%	
RIR	React, Include, Recycle; Reagir, Incluir, Reciclar,	Humanism; Pacifism	Syncretic	Márcia Henriques	22	0.4%	
JPP	Together for the People; Juntos pelo Povo	Regionalism; Social liberalism	Centre	Élvio Sousa	10 (Note: Lists in Braga, Coimbra, Faro, Lisbon, Porto, Setúbal, Azores, Madeira, Europe and Outside Europe.)	0.3%	
ND	New Right; Nova Direita	National conservatism Economic liberalism	Right-wing	Ossanda Liber	11 (Note: Lists in Aveiro, Beja, Braga, Coimbra, Faro, Leiria, Lisbon, Porto, Setúbal, Viseu and Madeira.)	0.3%	
PCTP/MRPP	Portuguese Workers' Communist Party; Partido Comunista dos Trabalhadores Portugueses	Marxism-Leninism; Maoism	Far-left	Cidália Guerreiro	9 (Note: Lists in Aveiro, Beja, Castelo Branco, Lisbon, Portalegre, Porto, Setúbal, Europe and Outside Europe.)	0.2%	
VP	Volt Portugal; Volt Portugal	Social liberalism European federalism	Centre to Centre-left	Inês Bravo Figueiredo; Duarte Costa	20 (Note: Except Azores and Madeira.)	0.2%	
E	Rise Up; Ergue-te	National conservatism Anti-immigration	Far-right	Rui da Fonseca e Castro	22	0.1%	
MPT	Earth Party; Partido da Terra	Green conservatism	Centre-right	Ricardo Camacho (Note: Main candidate from Madeira.); Manuel Carreira (Note: Main candidate from Azores.)	2 (Note: Only in Azores and Madeira.)	0.1% (Note: Compared with the 2024 Alternative 21 coalition (MPT/A). Alliance was extinguished before the elections.)	
PTP	Portuguese Labour Party; Partido Trabalhista Português	Democratic socialism Social democracy	Centre-left to Left-wing	Edgar Silva	1 (Note: Only in Madeira.)	0.0%	
NC	We, the Citizens! Nós, Cidadãos!	Social liberalism Pro-Europeanism	Centre-right	Joaquim Rocha Afonso	8 (Note: Lists in Aveiro, Évora, Guarda, Lisbon, Porto, Setúbal, Europe and Outside Europe.)	0.0%	
PPM	People's Monarchist Party; Partido Popular Monárquico	Monarchism; Conservatism	Right-wing	Paulo Estêvão (Note: As candidate for Prime Minister. Gonçalo da Câmara Pereira remained as party leader.)	21 (Note: With PSD/CDS on the Azores)	0.0%	
PLS	Liberal Social Party; Partido Liberal Social	Liberalism; Social liberalism	Centre to Centre-right	José Cardoso	5 (Note: Lists in Lisbon, Porto, Setúbal, Europe and Outside Europe)	—N/a	

== Campaign ==
=== Issues ===
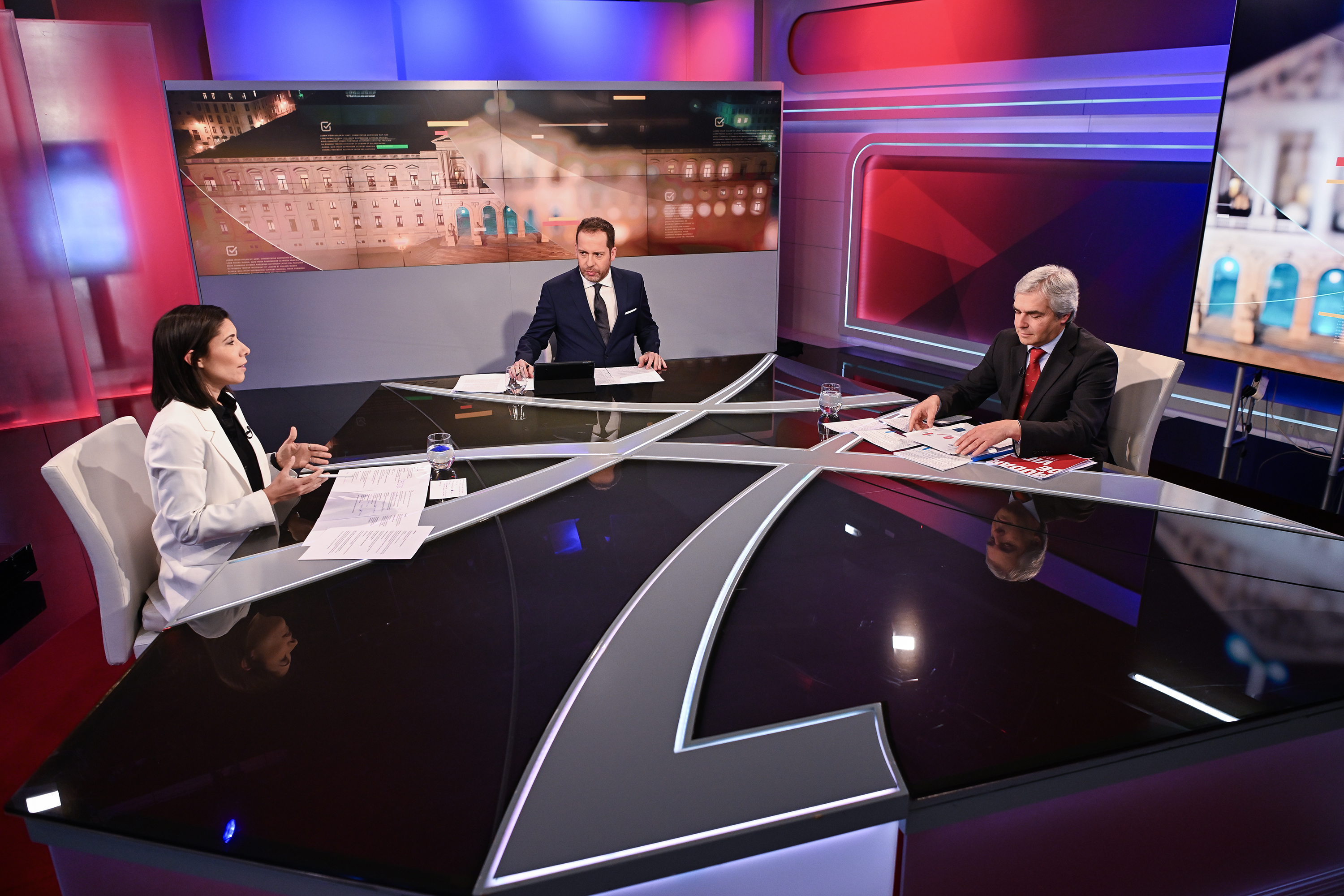
Debate between Nuno Melo and Joana Mortágua, broadcast by RTP1.

The campaign was dominated by several issues, from the Spinumviva case, with further revelations, but mainly regarding ethics and transparency topics, to the Housing crisis, the state of the National Health Service, Immigration and the increase in Defense spending. Additionally, just like in 2024, the issue of governability and stability after the election was also central in the campaign, with the two main parties debating whether or not to allow the winner to form a minority government. Voter fatigue and apathy were also a source of concern due to the succession of elections and scandals involving politicians.

On 16 April 2025, in the middle of the pre-election campaign and a month before election day, the Public Prosecution Service announced that it was analyzing complaints against Pedro Nuno Santos, leader of the PS, in relation to his properties and the way he paid for them. The PS leader rejected any irregularities and said he was not afraid of scrutiny. This preliminary investigation was closed one month after election day, with no evidence of irregularities being found. The 2025 Iberian Peninsula blackout happened three weeks before Election Day, also putting energy policy and the government's management of the blackout at the forefront of the campaign.

=== Party slogans of represented parties ===
Party or alliance	Original slogan	English translation	Refs
AD	« Portugal não pode parar! »	"Portugal cannot stop!"	
PS	« O Futuro é Já! »	"The Future is Now!"	
CH	« Salvar Portugal »	"Save Portugal"	
IL	« Acelerar Portugal »	"Accelerate Portugal"	
BE	« Mudar de vida »	"Change your life"	
CDU	« A tua vida importa, o teu voto conta »	"Your life matters, your vote counts"	
L	« A alternativa é ser LIVRE »	"The alternative is to be FREE"	
PAN	« Vota com o coração »	"Vote with your heart"	

=== Candidates' debates ===
==== With parties represented in Parliament ====
RTP1, SIC and TVI proposed a series of face to face debates, a total of 28, between the leaders of parties, or coalitions, represented in Parliament. The AD coalition proposed that the debates between the coalition and Left Bloc (BE), LIVRE (L) and People-Animals-Nature (PAN) be represented by CDS leader Nuno Melo, instead of Luís Montenegro. Parties criticized this position from AD, with LIVRE and BE refusing to debate Nuno Melo. The two debates between all the leaders of the parties, or coalitions, represented in Parliament were broadcast by RTP1 and by four radio stations.

2025 Portuguese legislative election debates
Date	Time	Organisers	Moderator(s)	P Present (Note: Denotes a main invitee attending the event.) S Surrogate (Note: Denotes a main invitee not attending the event, sending a surrogate in their place.) NI Not invited I Invited A Absent invitee								
Date	Time	Organisers	Moderator(s)	AD	PS	CH	IL	BE	CDU	L	PAN	Ref.
7 Apr	9PM	TVI	Sara Pinto	P Montenegro	NI	NI	NI	NI	P Raimundo	NI	NI	
7 Apr	10PM	RTP3	Hugo Gilberto	NI	NI	P Ventura	NI	NI	NI	NI	P Real	
8 Apr	9PM	SIC	Clara de Sousa	NI	P Santos	NI	NI	P Mortágua	NI	NI	NI	
8 Apr	10PM	RTP3	Hugo Gilberto	NI	NI	P Ventura	NI	NI	NI	P Tavares	NI	
9 Apr	6PM	SIC Notícias	Nelma Serpa; Pinto	NI	NI	NI	NI	NI	P Raimundo	P Tavares	NI	
10 Apr	9PM	RTP1	Hugo Gilberto	NI	P Santos	NI	P Rocha	NI	NI	NI	NI	
10 Apr	10PM	CNN Portugal	João Póvoa; Marinheiro	NI	NI	NI	NI	P Mortágua	NI	NI	P Real	
11 Apr	9PM	TVI	Sara Pinto	S Melo	NI	NI	NI	NI	NI	S Lopes	NI	
11 Apr	10PM	SIC Notícias	Nelma Serpa; Pinto	NI	NI	NI	P Rocha	NI	P Raimundo	NI	NI	
12 Apr	9PM	TVI	Sara Pinto	NI	P Santos	NI	NI	NI	NI	NI	P Real	
12 Apr	10PM	RTP3	Hugo Gilberto	NI	NI	NI	NI	P Mortágua	P Raimundo	NI	NI	
13 Apr	9PM	SIC	Clara de Sousa	S Melo	NI	NI	NI	NI	NI	NI	P Real	
13 Apr	10PM	CNN Portugal	João Póvoa; Marinheiro	NI	NI	NI	P Rocha	NI	NI	P Tavares	NI	
14 Apr	9PM	RTP1	Hugo Gilberto	P Montenegro	NI	NI	P Rocha	NI	NI	NI	NI	
14 Apr	10PM	SIC Notícias	Nelma Serpa; Pinto	NI	NI	NI	NI	P Mortágua	NI	P Tavares	NI	
15 Apr	9PM	TVI	Sara Pinto	NI	P Santos	P Ventura	NI	NI	NI	NI	NI	
15 Apr	10PM	SIC Notícias	Nelma Serpa; Pinto	NI	NI	NI	P Rocha	NI	NI	NI	P Real	
16 Apr	9PM	RTP1	Hugo Gilberto	S Melo	NI	NI	NI	S Mortágua	NI	NI	NI	
16 Apr	10PM	CNN Portugal	João Póvoa; Marinheiro	NI	NI	P Ventura	NI	NI	P Raimundo	NI	NI	
17 Apr	9PM	SIC	Clara de Sousa	NI	P Santos	NI	NI	NI	NI	P Tavares	NI	
17 Apr	10PM	RTP3	Hugo Gilberto	NI	NI	P Ventura	P Rocha	NI	NI	NI	NI	
21 Apr	9PM	RTP1	Hugo Gilberto	NI	P Santos	NI	NI	NI	P Raimundo	NI	NI	
21 Apr	10PM	SIC Notícias	Nelma Serpa; Pinto	NI	NI	P Ventura	NI	P Mortágua	NI	NI	NI	
22 Apr	6PM	RTP3	Hugo Gilberto	NI	NI	NI	NI	NI	NI	P Tavares	P Real	
23 Apr	6PM	CNN Portugal	João Póvoa; Marinheiro	NI	NI	NI	NI	NI	P Raimundo	NI	P Real	
24 Apr	9PM	SIC	Clara de Sousa	P Montenegro	NI	P Ventura	NI	NI	NI	NI	NI	
24 Apr	10PM	CNN Portugal	João Póvoa; Marinheiro	NI	NI	NI	P Rocha	P Mortágua	NI	NI	NI	
30 Apr (Note: Originally scheduled for 28 April. Postponed because of the 28 April Iberian blackout.)	8:30PM	RTP1; SIC; TVI	Hugo Gilberto; Clara de Sousa; Sara Pinto	P Montenegro	P Santos	NI	NI	NI	NI	NI	NI	
4 May	9PM	RTP1	Carlos Daniel	P Montenegro	P Santos	P Ventura	P Rocha	P Mortágua	P Raimundo	P Tavares	P Real	
5 May	9:30AM	Antena 1 TSF; Renascença; Observador	Natália Carvalho; Judith Menezes e Sousa; Susana; Madureira; Martins; Rui Pedro; Antunes	P Montenegro	P Santos	P Ventura	P Rocha	P Mortágua	P Raimundo	P Tavares	P Real	
Candidate viewed as "most convincing" in each debate or debates
Date	Time	Organisers	Polling firm									
Date	Time	Organisers	Polling firm	AD	PS	CH	IL	BE	CDU	L	PAN	Ref.
Debates between 7 and 24 April			Pitagórica	22.6%	12.5%	12.1%	5.2%	2.6%	—N/a	5.1%	—N/a	(Note: Undecided - 29.1%; Didn't see the debates - 8.5%; Other - 2.3%.)
Debates between 7 and 24 April			Aximage	27%	17%	26%	4%	5%	2%	9%	1%	(Note: Undecided - 9%.)
30 Apr	8:30PM	RTP1, SIC, TVI	Aximage	48%	40%	—N/a	—N/a	—N/a	—N/a	—N/a	—N/a	(Note: Undecided - 12%.)

==== With parties not represented in Parliament ====
Debates between leaders of the parties not represented in Parliament were also broadcast by RTP1 and other TV networks.

2025 Portuguese legislative election debates
Date	Organisers	Moderator(s)	P Present (Note: Denotes a main invitee attending the event.) S Surrogate (Note: Denotes a main invitee not attending the event, sending a surrogate in their place.) NI Not invited I Invited A Absent invitee												
Date	Organisers	Moderator(s)	ADN	RIR	JPP	ND	PCTP	VP	E	MPT	PTP	NC	PPM	PLS	Ref.
30 Apr	Porto Canal	Ana Rita; Gonçalves	P Fialho	NI	NI	NI	NI	S Loureiro	P Castro	NI	NI	NI	NI	NI	
6 May	RTP1	Carlos Daniel	P Dias	P Henriques	P Sousa	S Ferreira	P Pinto	P Costa	P Castro	P Rodrigues	P Coelho	P Afonso	P Estevão	P Cardoso	

== Opinion polling ==
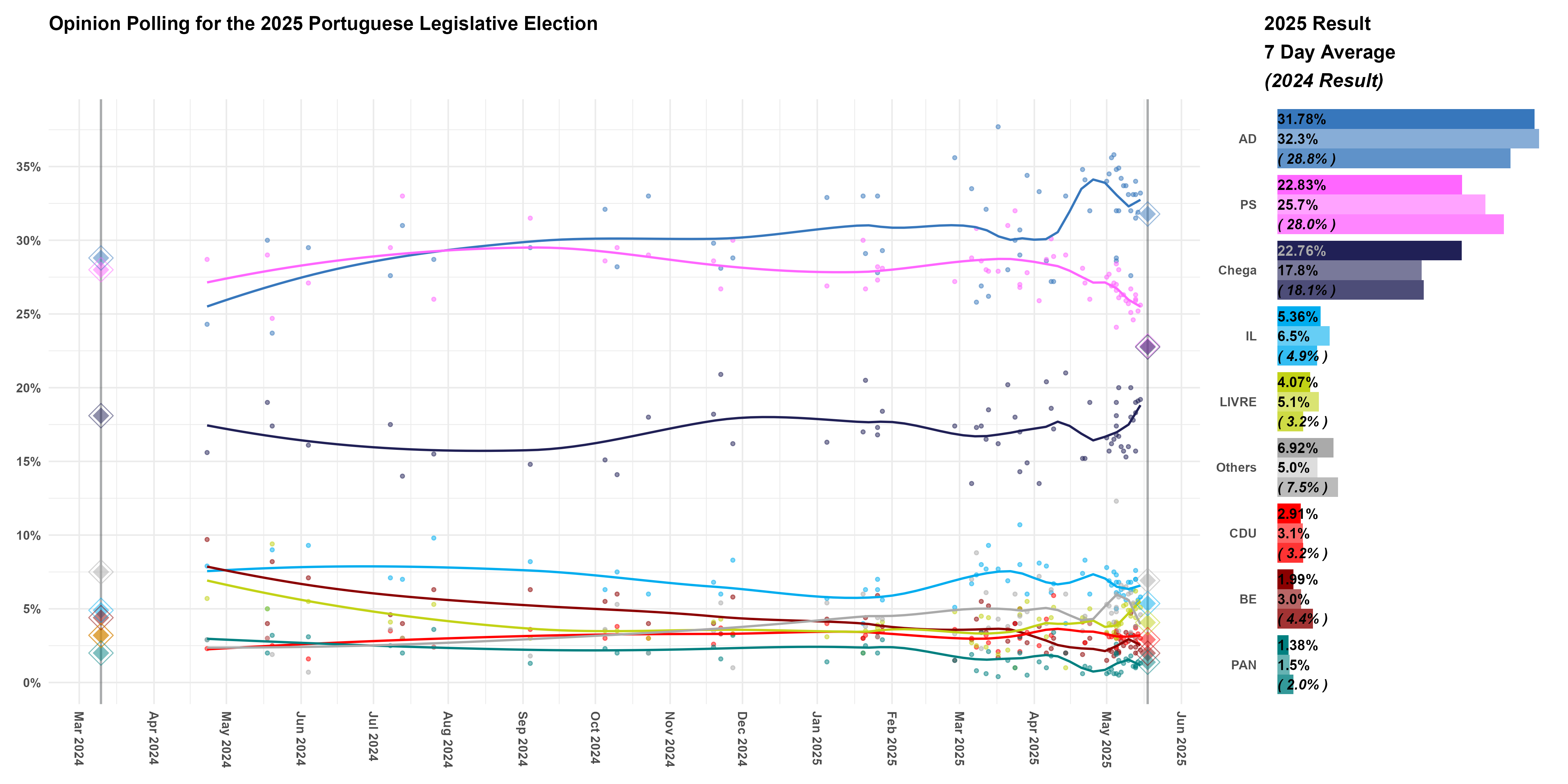
Graph of the polling for the 2025 Portuguese legislative election with 14 day average bar chart.

=== Polling aggregations ===
Polling aggregator	Last update	AD	PS	CH	IL	BE	CDU	L	PAN	Lead
2025 legislative election	18 May 2025	31.8; 91	22.8; 58	22.8; 60	5.4; 9	2.0; 1	2.9; 3	4.1; 6	1.4; 1	9.0
PolitPro	16 May 2025	30.9	26.8	18.4	6.4	2.6	3.2	3.8	1.7	4.1
Marktest	15 May 2025	33.1	26.3	17.4	6.5	2.5	3.2	4.3	1.2	6.8
Público	15 May 2025	32.4	26.2	17.9	6.5	2.7	3.3	4.2	1.2	6.2
Europe Elects	14 May 2025	33	26	17	7	2	3	5	1	7
Politico	14 May 2025	33	26	18	6	2	3	5	1	7
Renascença	12 May 2025	32.3	26.1	18.0	6.4	2.7	2.9	4.5	1.2	6.2
Observador	11 May 2025	32.6	26.3	17.7	6.9	3.3	2.5	4.8	1.1	6.3
2024 legislative election	10 Mar 2024	28.8; 80	28.0; 78	18.1; 50	4.9; 8	4.4; 5	3.2; 4	3.2; 4	2.0; 1	0.8

== Voter turnout ==
The table below shows voter turnout throughout election day including voters from Overseas.

Turnout	Time								
Turnout	12:00			16:00			19:00		
Turnout	2024	2025	±	2024	2025	±	2024	2025	±
Total	25.21%	25.56%	▲0.35 pp	51.96%	48.28%	▼3.68 pp	59.90%	58.25%	▼1.65 pp

Voter turnout was slightly lower in this election compared to 2024, with 6.3 million voters casting a ballot, nonetheless being the second highest number of votes cast in an election in Portuguese history. In Portugal alone, the turnout rate stood at 64.38 percent, a decrease of 1.85 percent compared with 2024, while in the Overseas constituencies, Europe and Outside of Europe, the turnout rate increased slightly to 22.24%, compared with the 21.56% from 2024. The overall share of voter turnout, Portugal alone and Overseas combined, stood at 58.25%, a 1.65 percent decrease compared with 2024.

== Results ==
In the second legislative election in just over a year, the Democratic Alliance (AD) was re-elected with a stronger mandate, gathering 31.8% of the votes and winning 91 seats. The Alliance won all districts in the North Region and gained several districts from the Socialists, like Coimbra, Castelo Branco, Santarém and Lisbon. Although the AD received a higher vote share and number of seats, it did not achieve a majority. To form a coalition government with the AD, the Liberal Initiative (IL)'s 9 seats would not be sufficient, so the AD would need to work with either the Socialist Party or Chega to form a coalition, or attempt another minority government.

Chega (CH) improved on its 2024 result and became the second largest party in Parliament, the first time in democracy that neither PS nor PSD are one of the two largest parties, receiving 22.8% of the vote and 60 seats, with party leader André Ventura becoming leader of the opposition. The party received a plurality of votes in four mainland districts: Faro, Beja, Setúbal and Portalegre, plus, also in the overseas constituencies of Europe and Outside of Europe. The Socialist Party (PS) came third, also for the first time in democracy, receiving just 22.8% of the votes and 58 seats, making this one of the worst results in the party's history, by losing even more ground compared to the 2024 elections and its status as the main opposition party.

The Liberal Initiative (IL) slightly increased its vote share to 5.4% and won nine seats, one more than in 2024. LIVRE was the only left-wing party to increase its vote share, receiving 4.1% and six seats, two more than in 2024. The Left Bloc (BE) received 2% of the vote and one seat, the party's worst performance, but party leader Mariana Mortágua did not resign.

The Unitary Democratic Coalition (CDU), composed of the Portuguese Communist Party and the Ecologist Party "The Greens", received 2.9% of the vote and just three seats, one less than the previous election, the worst result since the CDU alliance formed in 1987. The People Animals Nature (PAN) held onto its single seat, held by leader Inês Sousa Real, while the Madeira-based party, Together for the People (JPP), entered Parliament with one seat from the Madeira constituency.

For the first time since Portuguese democracy was restored in 1974, the two largest political forces combined, AD (PSD + CDS–PP) and PS, received less than two thirds of the seats in Parliament. All right-leaning parties combined won two-thirds of the seats in Parliament. A two-thirds majority is required for changes to the constitution, and for appointments to public bodies including the Constitutional Court.

=== National summary ===
Party or alliance		Votes	%	+/–	Seats	+/–
AD – PSD/CDS Coalition	AD – PSD/CDS Coalition (Note: Compared with the 2024 Democratic Alliance (PSD/CDS/PPM))	1,971,602	31.20	+3.02	88	+10
AD – PSD/CDS Coalition	Coalition PSD/CDS/PPM (Note: Only in Azores.)	36,886	0.58	–0.07	3	+1
AD – PSD/CDS Coalition	Total	2,008,488	31.78	+2.95	91	+11
Socialist Party		1,442,546	22.83	–5.15	58	–20
Chega		1,438,554	22.76	+4.73	60	+10
Liberal Initiative		338,974	5.36	+0.42	9	+1
LIVRE		257,291	4.07	+0.91	6	+2
Unitary Democratic Coalition		183,686	2.91	–0.26	3	–1
Left Bloc		125,808	1.99	–2.37	1	–4
People Animals Nature		86,930	1.38	–0.57	1	0
National Democratic Alternative		81,660	1.29	–0.29	0	0
Together for the People		20,900	0.33	+0.03	1	+1
React, Include, Recycle		14,021	0.22	–0.18	0	0
Volt Portugal		12,150	0.19	+0.01	0	0
Portuguese Workers' Communist Party		11,896	0.19	–0.05	0	0
Nova Direita		10,216	0.16	–0.09	0	0
Ergue-te		9,046	0.14	+0.05	0	0
Liberal Social Party		7,332	0.12	New	0	New
People's Monarchist Party		5,616	0.09	+0.08	0	0
We, the Citizens!		3,304	0.05	+0.01	0	0
Earth Party		478	0.01	–0.06	0	0
Portuguese Labour Party		425	0.01	–0.03	0	0
Total		6,059,321	100.00	–	230	0
Valid votes		6,059,321	95.88	+0.24		
Invalid votes		172,994	2.74	–0.23		
Blank votes		87,654	1.39	–0.00		
Total votes		6,319,969	100.00	–		
Registered voters/turnout		10,848,816	58.25	–1.65		
Source: Comissão Nacional de Eleições

Vote share
AD	31.78%
PS	22.83%
CH	22.76%
IL	5.36%
L	4.07%
CDU	2.91%
BE	1.99%
PAN	1.38%
ADN	1.29%
JPP	0.33%
Others	1.18%
Blank/invalid	4.13%

Parliamentary seats
AD	39.57%
CH	26.09%
PS	25.22%
IL	3.91%
L	2.61%
CDU	1.30%
BE	0.43%
PAN	0.43%
JPP	0.43%

=== Distribution by constituency ===
Results of the 2025 election of the Portuguese Assembly of the Republic by constituency
Constituency	%	S	%	S	%	S	%	S	%	S	%	S	%	S	%	S	%	S	Total S
Constituency	AD (Note: PSD/CDS–PP/PPM in Azores)		CH		PS		IL		L		CDU		BE		PAN		JPP		Total S
Azores	36.6	3	22.9	1	23.6	1	3.5	-	2.5	-	1.2	-	2.1	-	1.3	-	0.3	-	5
Aveiro	39.5	7	20.7	4	21.7	4	5.7	1	3.1	-	1.2	-	1.7	-	1.2	-			16
Beja	20.9	1	27.7	1	26.5	1	2.0	-	2.1	-	13.6	-	1.9	-	0.9	-			3
Braga	36.3	8	22.0	5	23.0	5	6.7	1	3.1	-	1.7	-	1.8	-	1.0	-	0.1	-	19
Bragança	43.7	2	20.4	-	25.4	1	2.2	-	1.1	-	1.0	-	0.8	-	0.7	-			3
Castelo Branco	32.3	2	23.4	1	28.6	1	3.0	-	2.6	-	2.1	-	1.7	-	0.9	-			4
Coimbra	34.4	4	18.4	2	27.4	3	4.4	-	4.1	-	2.5	-	2.2	-	1.2	-	0.1	-	9
Évora	24.8	1	24.8	1	27.8	1	2.8	-	2.7	-	10.2	-	1.8	-	0.9	-			3
Faro	25.7	3	33.9	4	20.5	2	4.4	-	3.4	-	2.7	-	2.6	-	1.8	-	0.1	-	9
Guarda	39.6	1	21.1	1	26.4	1	2.4	-	1.5	-	1.3	-	1.2	-	0.7	-			3
Leiria	37.1	5	23.1	3	19.0	2	6.0	-	3.5	-	2.1	-	1.9	-	1.2	-			10
Lisbon	28.5	15	20.9	11	23.7	12	7.6	4	6.9	3	3.6	1	2.4	1	1.8	1	0.1	-	48
Madeira	41.4	3	20.9	1	13.5	1	2.6	-	1.3	-	1.3	-	1.4	-	1.0	-	12.3	1	6
Portalegre	26.8	-	29.9	1	28.0	1	1.9	-	1.7	-	5.2	-	1.3	-	0.7	-			2
Porto	34.2	15	20.7	9	24.0	11	6.1	2	4.3	2	2.3	1	2.0	-	1.5	-	0.1	-	40
Santarém	30.6	4	28.1	3	22.8	2	3.9	-	3.2	-	3.6	-	1.8	-	1.1	-			9
Setúbal	21.0	5	26.4	6	25.0	5	5.5	1	5.8	1	7.1	1	2.7	-	1.9	-	0.1	-	19
Viana do Castelo	39.6	3	23.0	1	21.7	1	3.8	-	2.6	-	2.0	-	1.6	-	0.9	-			5
Vila Real	44.4	3	20.0	1	24.6	1	2.2	-	1.5	-	1.2	-	1.0	-	0.7	-			5
Viseu	42.7	4	22.1	2	21.9	2	3.1	-	2.1	-	1.2	-	1.2	-					8
Europe	14.7	1	28.2	1	13.5	-	2.5	-	2.2	-	0.9	-	1.9	-	1.6	-	0.2	-	2
Outside Europe	19.6	1	20.8	1	13.5	-	2.1	-	1.0	-	0.6	-	1.8	-	2.1	-	0.2	-	2
Total	31.8	91	22.8	60	22.8	58	5.4	9	4.1	6	2.9	3	2.0	1	1.4	1	0.3	1	230

=== Maps ===
Winner and seats by constituency.

Most voted by municipality: AD (orange), PS (pink), CH (blue)

Most voted by parish

=== Demographics ===
(Note: The Pitagórica exit poll data covers only the territory of Continental Portugal.)

Demographic	Size	AD	PS	CH	IL	L	CDU	BE	PAN	Others
Total vote (Note: For purely demonstrative purposes, it includes Azores, Madeira and Overseas as well.)	100%	31.8%	22.8%	22.8%	5.4%	4.1%	2.9%	2.0%	1.4%	6.8%
Sex
Men	—N/a	31%	22%	27%	7%	4%	3%	1%	1%	4%
Women	—N/a	33%	25%	19%	5%	5%	3%	3%	2%	5%
Age
18–24 years old	—N/a	27%	10%	25%	11%	10%	3%	4%	2%	8%
25–34 years old	—N/a	26%	11%	32%	12%	8%	2%	3%	2%	4%
35–54 years old	—N/a	31%	19%	28%	6%	4%	3%	2%	2%	5%
55+ years old	—N/a	36%	35%	14%	2%	2%	4%	1%	1%	5%
Education
No High-school	—N/a	29%	32%	26%	1%	1%	4%	1%	1%	5%
High-school	—N/a	29%	19%	31%	5%	4%	3%	2%	2%	5%
College graduate	—N/a	38%	21%	12%	10%	8%	3%	2%	2%	4%
Source: Pitagórica exit poll

Demographic	Size	AD	PS	CH	IL	L	CDU	BE	PAN	Others
Total vote	100%	31.8%	22.8%	22.8%	5.4%	4.1%	2.9%	2.0%	1.4%	6.8%
Sex
Men	—N/a	31%	22%	26%	7%	4%	3%	1%	1%	5%
Women	—N/a	34%	25%	19%	5%	5%	3%	3%	2%	5%
Age
18–24 years old	—N/a	29%	12%	25%	10%	9%	2%	4%	2%	7%
25–34 years old	—N/a	28%	10%	31%	12%	8%	2%	3%	2%	4%
35–44 years old	—N/a	26%	17%	33%	8%	5%	2%	2%	2%	5%
45–54 years old	—N/a	34%	22%	24%	5%	3%	3%	2%	2%	6%
55–64 years old	—N/a	39%	28%	19%	3%	3%	3%	1%	1%	4%
65+ years old	—N/a	37%	40%	10%	1%	1%	5%	1%	0%	5%
Age by sex
Men, 18–24 years old	—N/a	28%	9%	31%	14%	6%	1%	2%	1%	8%
Women, 18–24 years old	—N/a	29%	14%	19%	7%	12%	2%	7%	3%	7%
Men, 25–34 years old	—N/a	26%	8%	36%	14%	6%	2%	2%	1%	5%
Women, 25–34 years old	—N/a	30%	11%	27%	10%	9%	2%	4%	3%	4%
Men, 35–44 years old	—N/a	24%	13%	39%	9%	5%	2%	2%	1%	5%
Women, 35–44 years old	—N/a	27%	19%	29%	7%	5%	2%	3%	3%	6%
Men, 45–54 years old	—N/a	32%	20%	28%	6%	3%	3%	1%	1%	5%
Women, 45–54 years old	—N/a	35%	23%	21%	4%	3%	3%	2%	2%	6%
Men, 55–64 years old	—N/a	36%	28%	22%	3%	3%	3%	1%	0%	4%
Women, 55–64 years old	—N/a	41%	27%	16%	2%	2%	3%	1%	1%	5%
Men, 65+ years old	—N/a	36%	39%	12%	1%	1%	6%	1%	0%	4%
Women, 65+ years old	—N/a	37%	42%	8%	1%	1%	3%	1%	0%	6%
Education
No High-school	—N/a	31%	32%	24%	1%	1%	3%	1%	1%	6%
High-school	—N/a	28%	21%	31%	5%	4%	3%	2%	1%	5%
College graduate	—N/a	39%	19%	14%	9%	7%	3%	3%	2%	4%
Monthly income
Until 800€	—N/a	27%	25%	28%	3%	3%	2%	2%	2%	8%
801€–1500€	—N/a	28%	21%	29%	5%	4%	3%	3%	2%	4%
1501€–2500€	—N/a	36%	21%	21%	7%	5%	3%	2%	1%	4%
2501€–3500€	—N/a	38%	21%	17%	8%	6%	3%	2%	1%	3%
3500€+	—N/a	42%	21%	13%	11%	5%	3%	1%	1%	3%
Vote decision
On election day	10%	25%	25%	19%	6%	6%	3%	3%	2%	11%
Week before	8%	26%	19%	18%	12%	10%	2%	4%	3%	7%
15 days before	8%	31%	17%	22%	10%	9%	2%	3%	2%	4%
Before that	74%	36%	22%	24%	5%	4%	3%	2%	1%	4%
Source: CESOP–UCP exit poll

== Aftermath ==
Following the publication of the preliminary results, Montenegro declared victory, saying that "the people want this Government and they don't want any other", while PS leader Pedro Nuno Santos conceded defeat and congratulated Montenegro, adding that he would resign from the Socialist leadership. A leadership contest to elect a new party leader was quickly initiated.

André Ventura, the leader of Chega, declared the end of the two-party system in Portugal, warning that "they haven't seen nothing yet". Liberal Initiative leader Rui Rocha acknowledged that, despite the growth in votes and seats, the party "wanted more", with the Liberal result being seen as a little disappointing, and rejected governmental deals with AD. Two weeks after election day, Rocha announced his resignation from the leadership of the Liberal Initiative.

Livre leader Rui Tavares thanked the over 200,000 voters for their support as the party secured six seats in parliament. He announced the formation of a gender-balanced parliamentary group and called for a progressive national movement to oppose growing right-wing radicalism. He criticized the broader left for lacking a clear alternative government plan and reaffirmed Livre's role as a serious and constructive opposition. Mariana Mortágua, the leader of the Left Bloc (BE) refused to resign, despite leading her party to the worst result in its history, though recognizing the "great defeat" for the party and announced her re-election bid as party leader.

Paulo Raimundo, the leader of CDU, insisted that the Communist-Green coalition "resisted in a particularly demanding framework", while Inês Sousa Real, the leader of PAN acknowledged that the results were "not what they wanted" but that what matters is that "our voice isn't silenced". The Madeiran Together for the People party (JPP) made history for being the first regional type party to be elected to the national Parliament, with the party's elected MP, Filipe Sousa, promising to be the "voice of the islands".

Two days after the election, on 20 May, President Marcelo Rebelo de Sousa began hearings with party leaders for the appointment of a Prime Minister, with PSD, PS and Chega being the first parties to be called, with the rest of parties represented in Parliament received in the following days. The President held, on 29 May, a second round of hearings with the leaders of the three main parties, after the counting of the overseas votes confirmed Chega as the second largest party in Parliament and André Ventura as leader of the opposition. Following these hearings, the President nominated Luís Montenegro as Prime Minister and asked him to form a government. The new government, again a minority one, was presented and approved by President Marcelo Rebelo de Sousa on 4 June and took office on 5 June.

== See also ==
- Elections in Portugal
- 2025 elections in the European Union
