= Inês Sousa Real =

Portuguese politician (born 1980)

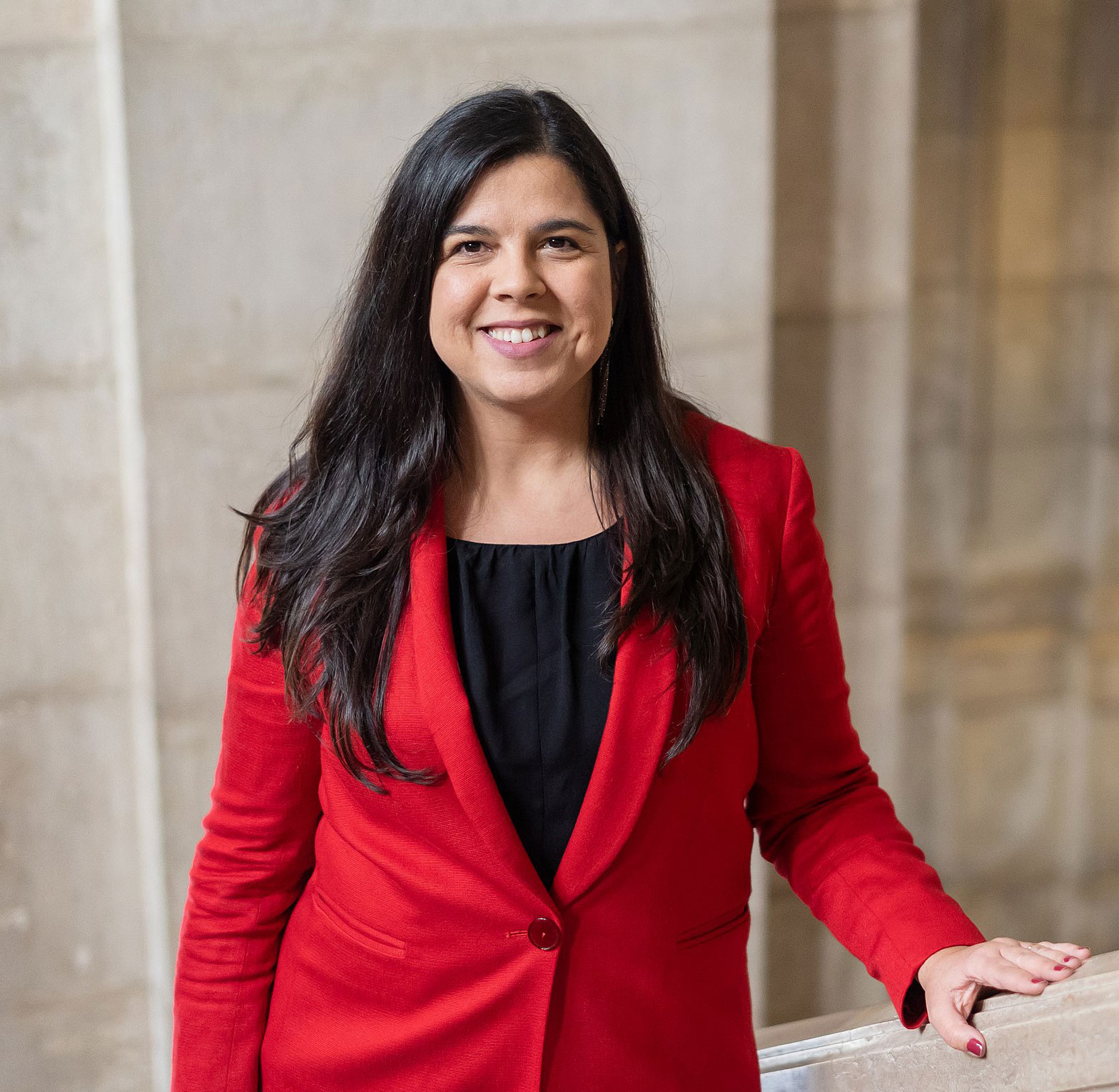
- Sousa Real in 2022

Member of the Assembly of the Republic
- Incumbent
- Assumed office 25 October 2019
- Constituency: Lisbon

Spokesperson of People Animals Nature
- Incumbent
- Assumed office 6 June 2021
- Preceded by: André Lourenço e Silva

Personal details
- Born: 6 June 1980 (age 46) Lisbon, Portugal
- Party: People Animals Nature (2011–present)
- Education: Universidade Autónoma de Lisboa

Paula Inês Alves de Sousa Real (born 6 June 1980) is a Portuguese jurist and politician who is currently president of the People Animals Nature parliamentary group in the Assembly of the Republic. At the PAN convention on 6 June 2021, she was elected on a single list as the spokesperson of the party.

== Political career ==
Sousa Real was elected to the Lisbon Municipal Assembly in 2017 and the Assembly of the Republic in 2019. She is a member of the political commission of the PAN. After André Lourenço e Silva announced he was stepping down, a party congress to elect a new leader was scheduled for the weekend of 5–6 June 2021. For that leadership congress, Sousa Real was the only candidate who stepped forward. On 6 June, she was elected as leader of PAN with 87.2% of the votes in the party's congress in Tomar.

In the snap elections in January 2022, Sousa Real was the only PAN deputy to be elected as the party fell from four seats to one. She said that the prospect of a Socialist Party absolute majority would be bad for democracy.

In May 2023, Sousa Real retained her position as leader of PAN, receiving 73% of votes in a run-off against Nelson Silva at the 9th party congress in Matosinhos.

Sousa Real was again the only PAN member elected to the Assembly of the Republic in 2024 and 2025. After the latter, she rejected media speculation that her leadership of the party was under threat. Two members of the political commission of the party resigned following the election, alleging a lack of internal democracy.

== Electoral history ==
=== Lisbon City Council election, 2017 ===
Ballot: 1 October 2017
Party	Candidate	Votes	%	Seats	+/−
PS	Fernando Medina	106,036	42.0	8	–3
CDS–PP/MPT/PPM	Assunção Cristas	51,984	20.6	4	+3
PSD	Teresa Leal Coelho	28,336	11.2	2	–1
CDU	João Ferreira	24,110	9.6	2	±0
BE	Ricardo Robles	18,025	7.1	1	+1
PAN	Inês Sousa Real	7,658	3.0	0	±0
Other parties		5,833	2.3	0	±0
Blank/Invalid ballots		10,498	4.2	–	–
Turnout		252,481	51.16	17	±0
Source: Autárquicas 2017

=== PAN leadership election, 2021 ===
Ballot: 6 June 2021
Candidate	Votes	%
Inês Sousa Real	109	87.2
Blank/Invalid ballots	16	12.8
Turnout	125	
Source: Results

=== Legislative election, 2022 ===
Ballot: 30 January 2022
Party	Candidate	Votes	%	Seats	+/−
PS	António Costa	2,302,601	41.4	120	+12
PSD	Rui Rio	1,618,381	29.1	77	–2
Chega	André Ventura	399,659	7.2	12	+11
IL	João Cotrim Figueiredo	273,687	4.9	8	+7
BE	Catarina Martins	244,603	4.4	5	–14
CDU	Jerónimo de Sousa	238,920	4.3	6	–6
CDS–PP	Rodrigues dos Santos	89,181	1.6	0	–5
PAN	Inês Sousa Real	88,152	1.6	1	–3
Livre	Rui Tavares	71,232	1.3	1	±0
Other parties		91,299	1.6	0	±0
Blank/Invalid ballots		146,824	2.6	–	–
Turnout		5,564,539	51.46	230	±0
Source: Comissão Nacional de Eleições

=== PAN leadership election, 2023 ===
Ballot: 20 May 2023
Candidate	Votes	%
Inês Sousa Real	97	72.9
Nelson Silva	35	26.3
Blank/Invalid ballots	1	0.8
Turnout	133	
Source: Results

=== Legislative election, 2024 ===
Ballot: 10 March 2024
Party	Candidate	Votes	%	Seats	+/−
AD	Luís Montenegro	1,867,442	28.8	80	+3
PS	Pedro Nuno Santos	1,812,443	28.0	78	–42
Chega	André Ventura	1,169,781	18.1	50	+38
IL	Rui Rocha	319,877	4.9	8	±0
BE	Mariana Mortágua	282,314	4.4	5	±0
CDU	Paulo Raimundo	205,551	3.2	4	–2
Livre	Rui Tavares	204,875	3.2	4	+3
PAN	Inês Sousa Real	126,125	2.0	1	±0
ADN	Bruno Fialho	102,134	1.6	0	±0
Other parties		104,167	1.6	0	±0
Blank/Invalid ballots		282,243	4.4	–	–
Turnout		6,476,952	59.90	230	±0
Source: Comissão Nacional de Eleições

=== Legislative election, 2025 ===
Ballot: 18 May 2025
Party	Candidate	Votes	%	Seats	+/−
AD	Luís Montenegro	2,008,488	31.8	91	+11
PS	Pedro Nuno Santos	1,442,546	22.8	58	–20
Chega	André Ventura	1,438,554	22.8	60	+10
IL	Rui Rocha	338,974	5.4	9	+1
Livre	Rui Tavares	257,291	4.1	6	+2
CDU	Paulo Raimundo	183,686	2.9	3	–1
BE	Mariana Mortágua	125,808	2.0	1	–4
PAN	Inês Sousa Real	86,930	1.4	1	±0
ADN	Bruno Fialho	81,660	1.3	0	±0
Other parties		95,384	1.5	1	+1
Blank/Invalid ballots		260,648	4.1	–	–
Turnout		6,319,969	58.25	230	±0
Source: Comissão Nacional de Eleições
