= People Animals Nature =

Environmentalist political party in Portugal

People-Animals-Nature Pessoas-Animais-Natureza
- Abbreviation: PAN
- Leader: Collective leadership
- Spokesperson: Inês Sousa Real
- Founded: 22 May 2009
- Legalised: 13 January 2011
- Headquarters: Av. Almirante Reis, 81 B 1150-012 Lisbon
- Membership (2023): 2,724
- Ideology: Environmentalism; Animal rights; Ecofeminism
- Political position: Centre to centre-left
- European affiliation: European Green Party
- European Parliament group: Greens-European Free Alliance
- European political alliance: Animal Politics EU
- Colours: Teal
- Assembly of the Republic: 1 / 230
- European Parliament: 0 / 21
- Regional parliaments: 1 / 104
- Local government (Mayors): 0 / 308
- Local government (Parishes): 0 / 3,216

Election symbol

Website
- pan.com.pt
- Politics of Portugal; Political parties; Elections; A: Some sources state that the party is neither on the left nor the right.

People-Animals-Nature (Portuguese: Pessoas-Animais-Natureza, PAN) is an environmentalist, animal rights, and animal welfare-focused political party in Portugal, which was founded in 2009. In the 2011 Madeiran regional election, it received 2.13% of the votes (3,135) votes, electing one member to the regional parliament, Rui Manuel dos Santos Almeida. In 2015, they party won one seat in the Assembly of the Republic.

In 2019, PAN won one seat in the European Parliament, and increased its seat share to four in the Assembly of the Republic (with two seats won in Lisbon, one in Porto, and one in Setúbal). In November 2021, amid a political crisis, the so-called geringonça (an informal left-wing alliance) collapsed due to disagreements over labor legislation and the following year's state budget. PAN was the only party in the parliament to abstain voting, arguing that the country was not ready for another political and potential financial crisis during the COVID-19 pandemic. This move ultimately had no effect on voting outcome, and the government was dissolved by then President Marcelo Rebelo de Sousa.

== Ideology, political position and policies ==
People-Animals-Nature is commonly described as an environmentalist party. It has been described as "known for fighting for animal rights", "fights against cruelty to animals", and as holding an "animalist" ideology. The party has been described as espousing ecofeminist and progressive ideologies. Some sources state that the party identifies "neither from the right nor from the left." While others identify it as centrist or centre-left on the political spectrum.

On policy, the party has campaigned to invest in the national health service while believing that the private and public sectors can work together. It supports free transportation to combat climate change and proposes cutting Portugal's corporate income tax rate to 17 percent by 2026. André Silva, then a party MP and spokesperson, said on the party's fifth anniversary in January 2016 that PAN's visibility had highlighted "causes, values, messages, ideas and measures that nobody else talks about", such as "bull fighting, climate change and oil drilling", which he dubbed "forgotten subjects". Along with the political party LIVRE, PAN has "sparked discussions about unconditional basic income".

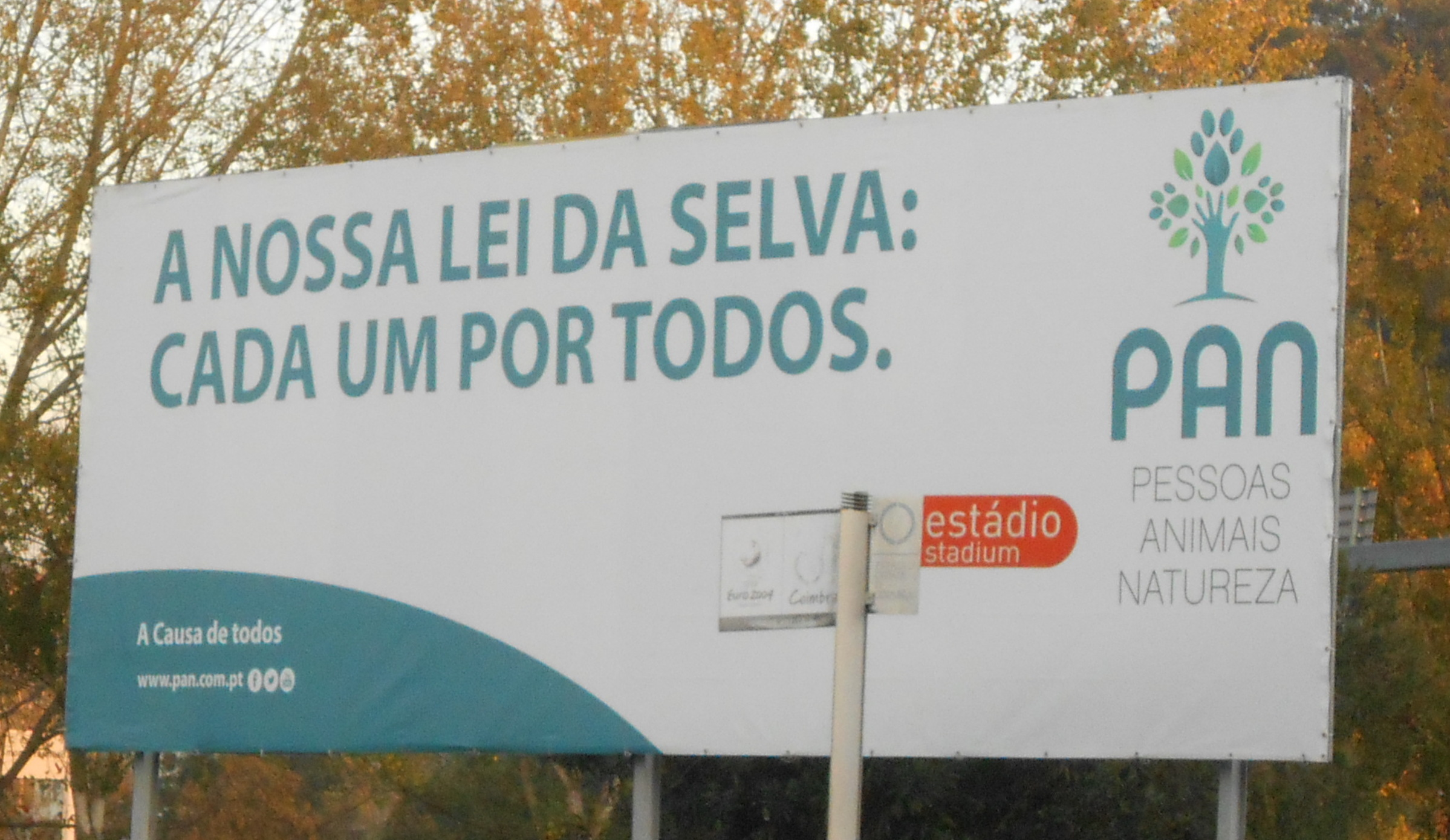
Outdoor in Coimbra for the 2015 legislative elections

== Election results ==
=== Assembly of the Republic ===
Vote share in the Portuguese legislative elections

Election	Leader	Votes	%	Seats	+/-	Government
2011	Paulo Borges	57,849	1.0 (#7)	0 / 230	New	No seats
2015	André Lourenço e Silva	75,140	1.4 (#6)	1 / 230	▲1	Opposition
2019	André Lourenço e Silva	173,931	3.3 (#6)	4 / 230	▲3	Opposition
2022	Inês Sousa Real	88,152	1.6 (#7)	1 / 230	▼3	Opposition
2024	Inês Sousa Real	126,125	2.0 (#7)	1 / 230	0	Opposition
2025	Inês Sousa Real	86,930	1.4 (#8)	1 / 230	0	Opposition

=== European Parliament ===
Election	Leader	Votes	%	Seats	+/–	EP Group
2014	Orlando Figueiredo	56,363	1.7 (#7)	0 / 21	New	–
2019	Francisco Guerreiro	168,015	5.1 (#6)	1 / 21	▲1	G/EFA
2024	Pedro Fidalgo Marques	48,006	1.2 (#9)	0 / 21	▼1	–

=== Regional Assemblies ===
Region	Election	Votes	%	Seats	+/-	Government
Azores	2024	1,907	1.7 (#6)	1 / 57	0	Opposition
Madeira	2025	2,323	1.6 (#8)	0 / 47	▼1	No seats

=== Municipalities ===
Municipality	Votes	Percentage	Local assemblies
Albufeira	629	4.6%	1 / 21
Almada	3,340	5.0%	1 / 33
Amadora	2,561	4.1%	1 / 33
Aveiro	1,508	4.4%	1 / 27
Barreiro	1,173	3.4%	1 / 27
Cascais	4,006	5.2%	1 / 33
Faro	1,235	4.6%	1 / 27
Horta	392	4.8%	1 / 21
Lagos	470	4.3%	1 / 21
Leiria	1,988	3.2%	1 / 33
Lisbon	10,811	4.3%	2 / 51
Loures	2,637	3.1%	1 / 33
Mafra	1,398	4.2%	1 / 27
Maia	3,046	4.2%	1 / 33
Matosinhos	3,022	3.8%	1 / 33
Moita	1,060	4.3%	1 / 27
Odivelas	2,339	4.0%	1 / 33
Oeiras	3,183	3.9%	1 / 33
Porto	3,195	2.8%	1 / 39
Póvoa de Varzim	1,397	4.7%	1 / 27
Seixal	2,875	4.8%	1 / 33
Setúbal	1,859	4.1%	1 / 33
Sintra	5,823	4.4%	1 / 33
Vila Franca de Xira	2,468	4.6%	1 / 33
Vila Nova de Gaia	5,131	3.7%	1 / 33

=== Parishes ===
Municipality	Votes	Percentage	Parish assemblies
Albufeira e Olhos de Água	392	4.8%	1 / 19
Algés, Linda-a-Velha e Cruz Quebrada-Dafundo	991	4.5%	1 / 21
Algueirão-Mem Martins	1,038	4.7%	1 / 21
Arroios	706	5.2%	1 / 19
Oeiras e São Julião da Barra, Paço de Arcos e Caxias	1,192	4.2%	1 / 21
Penha de França	649	5.5%	1 / 19
Olivais	672	4.52%	1 / 19

=== Local results ===
Date	Mayors	+/-	Parishes	+/-	Municipal Chamber	+/-	Municipal Assembly	+/-	Local Assembly	+/-
2013	0 / 308	New	0 / 3,057	New	0 / 2,056	New	5 / 6,424	New	1 / 26,705	New
2017	0 / 308	Steady	0 / 3,057	Steady	0 / 2,056	Steady	26 / 6,424	+21	6 / 26,705	+5
2021	0 / 308	Steady	0 / 3,057	Steady	0 / 2,056	Steady	23 / 6,424	-3	16 / 26,705	+10

== Organization ==
=== List of leaders ===
Name		Portrait	Constituency	Tenure			Prime Minister
Name		Portrait	Constituency	Start	End	Duration	Prime Minister
1	Paulo Borges (b. 1959)		Lisbon	10 April 2011	26 October 2014	3 years, 199 days	José Sócrates (2005–2011)
1	Paulo Borges (b. 1959)		Lisbon	10 April 2011	26 October 2014	3 years, 199 days	Pedro Passos Coelho (2011–2015)
2	André Silva (b. 1976)		Lisbon	26 October 2014	6 June 2021	6 years, 223 days	Pedro Passos Coelho (2011–2015)
2	André Silva (b. 1976)		Lisbon	26 October 2014	6 June 2021	6 years, 223 days	António Costa (2015–2024)
3	Inês Sousa Real (b. 1980)		Europe (2011–2015); Lisbon (since 2015)	6 June 2021	Incumbent	5 years, 167 days	António Costa (2015–2024)
3	Inês Sousa Real (b. 1980)		Europe (2011–2015); Lisbon (since 2015)	6 June 2021	Incumbent	5 years, 167 days	Luís Montenegro (2024–present)

=== Elected members ===
==== Members of the Assembly of the Republic ====
17th Legislature (2025 – present)
- Inês Sousa Real (Lisbon)
16th Legislature (2024 – 2025)
- Inês Sousa Real (Lisbon)
15th Legislature (2022 – 2024)
- Inês Sousa Real (Lisbon)
14th Legislature (2019 – 2022)
- André Silva (Lisbon) – until June 2021
  Nelson Silva – from June 2021
- Inês Sousa Real (Lisbon)
- Bebiana Cunha (Porto)
- Cristina Rodrigues (Setúbal) – became independent in June 2020
13th Legislature (2015 – 2019)
- André Silva (Lisbon)

==== Members of the European Parliament ====
9th Legislature (2019 – 2024)
- Francisco Guerreiro – became independent in June 2020
