= Nelson Silva =

Portuguese politician

Member of the Assembly of the Republic
- In office 6 June 2021 – 28 March 2022
- Constituency: Lisbon

Personal details
- Born: Nélson José Basílio Silva; 16 June 1985 (age 40)
- Party: People Animals Nature
- Occupation: Politician

Nélson José Basílio Silva (born 16 June 1985) is a Portuguese politician, who was a member of the Assembly of the Republic, from 2021, after André Silva resigned as party leader and MP, until 2022. He ran for the party's leadership in May 2023 against Inês Sousa Real and was defeated.
