= Francisco Guerreiro =

Portuguese politician

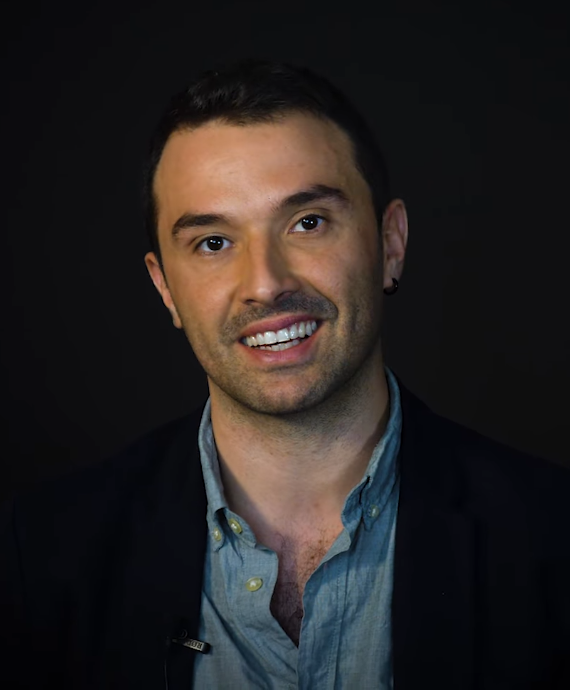

Member of the European Parliament for Portugal
- In office 2 July 2019 – 15 July 2024

Personal details
- Born: 12 September 1984 (age 41) Santiago do Cacém, Setúbal, Portugal
- Party: European Green Party (since 2020); Volt Portugal (since 2024)
- Other political affiliations: People Animals Nature (2012-2020)
- Children: 2

Jorge Francisco Alves Vicente de Sousa Guerreiro (born 12 September 1984) is a Portuguese politician currently serving as an independent Member of the European Parliament for Portugal, having been elected whilst standing as a candidate for People Animals Nature.

== Biography ==
Francisco Guerreiro was born on 12 September 1984 in Santiago do Cacém and initially grew up in an orphanage before being adopted at the age of 3 and living in Lisbon. At the age of 12, he moved with his family to Coimbra, where he would study communication sciences at Coimbra's Escola Superior de Educação (ESEC). Guerreiro then worked as a market researcher and, until 2014, as a project manager for the European Commission.

Francisco Guerreiro lives in Cascais with his wife Sandra Marques and two children. Even after entering the European Parliament, he plans to commute regularly between Brussels and Cascais. According to his own statements, he eats a vegan diet.

== Political work ==
According to party information, Guerreiro joined the Portuguese small party People - Animals - Nature (PAN) in 2012. He rose relatively quickly within the party: he has been a member of the party's political commission since 2013, and head of the party's communications since 2014.

In 2015, the PAN party entered the Portuguese Parliament for the first time with a deputy, André Silva. Since then, Guerreiro has worked as a research assistant for Silva, in particular accompanying and assisting him in the committees on the environment, spatial planning, decentralisation, and local government and housing.

Guerreiro has previously stood for PAN in many elections, including the 2013 municipal elections in Coimbra, the 2014 European elections as third on the list, and the 2015 parliamentary elections as second on the national list. In 2017, he stood in the municipal elections of his home town, Cascais.

In 2018, his party put Guerreiro at number one on the list for the 2019 European elections in Portugal. With 5.08 per cent, the party won its first mandate in European elections, and Guerreiro entered the European Parliament. In the election campaign, he had mainly advocated classic Green positions: He called for a stronger commitment of the EU against climate change, among other things through a dedicated Vice-President or Vice-President of the EU Commission for the issue. He also called for more commitment to a Europe-wide energy transition. On migration policy, he called for a fair distribution of migrants among all EU member states.

After the election, he and his party announced on election night that they would join the Green/EFA group. For the group, he is a member of the Committee on Budgets, the Committee on Agriculture and Rural Development, and the Committee on Fisheries.

In June 2020, Guerreiro announced that he was leaving the PAN due to differences of opinion. The politician cited the party's "increasing leftist orientation" as the main reason, as well as the party's "generally increased aggressiveness", its passivity towards China's geopolitical activities in Europe, and the party's position on military service. Guerreiro further announced that he would not renounce his mandate in parliament and would continue to be a member of the Greens/EFA group.

In October 2021, at the general assembly of the pan-European movement Volt Europa in Lisbon, he announced that he would join Volt Portugal as a member after his mandate expired. He previously supported the party in the municipal election campaign.
