= Algueirão–Mem Martins =

- Civil parish
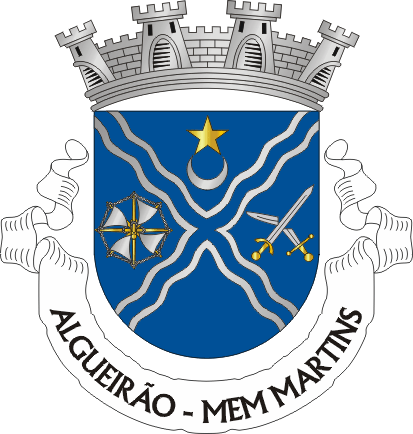
- Coat of arms

- Location in Portugal
- Coordinates: 38.8°N 9.35°W
- Country: Portugal
- Region: Lisbon
- Metropolitan area: Lisbon
- District: Lisbon
- Municipality: Sintra

Area
  - Total: 16.00 km^{2} (6.18 sq mi)

Population (2011)
  - Total: 66,250
  - Density: 4,141/km^{2} (10,720/sq mi)
- Time zone: UTC+00:00 (WET)
  - Summer (DST): UTC+01:00 (WEST)

Algueirão – Mem Martins (Portuguese pronunciation: [alɣɐjˈɾɐ̃w ˈmɐ̃j mɐɾˈtĩʃ]) is a Portuguese civil parish, in the municipality (concelho) of Sintra, and part of the Lisbon Metropolitan Area.

It was elevated from the status of village to town on 1 February 1988.

== History ==
=== Toponymy ===
The toponym 'Algueirão' dates back to the Muslim presence in the region between the 8th and 12th centuries. It evolved from the Arab term al-gueirān, meaning the caves.

'Mem Martins' is a proper name of uncertain origin, consisting of the medieval given name Mem and the patronymic Martins, likely after one of the first property owners in the region following the Portuguese conquest of Lisbon and Sintra.

== Geography ==
It covers 16.00 km².

== Demographics ==
The population in 2011 was 66,250. The population density is 4,100 inhabitants per square kilometer.

== Notable structures ==
- Fountain of Sacotes (Fontanário de Sacotes)
- Church of Nossa Senhora das Mercês (Capela e Recinto da Feira das Mercês/Igreja de Nossa Senhora das Mercês), a 17th-century church and churchyard;
- Hermitage of São Romão (Ermida de São Romão), a Manueline-era rural hermitage, comprising one nave with a vaulted ceiling.

== Notable people ==
- André Ventura, jurist, professor, former sports pundit and politician, founder and president of the Chega party
