= André Silva (politician) =

Portuguese politician (born 1976)

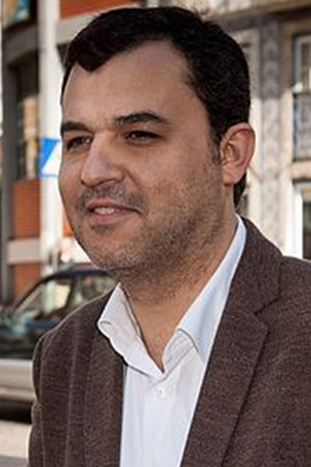

Member of the Assembly of the Republic
- In office 23 October 2015 – 28 May 2021
- Constituency: Lisbon

Spokesperson of People Animals Nature
- In office 26 October 2014 – 6 June 2021
- Preceded by: Paulo Borges
- Succeeded by: Inês Sousa Real

Personal details
- Born: 2 April 1976 (age 50) Lisbon, Portugal
- Party: People Animals Nature (2012–2024)
- Children: 1
- Education: Instituto Superior de Engenharia de Coimbra

André Lourenço e Silva (born 2 April 1976) is a Portuguese former politician who was the spokesperson of People–Animals–Nature (PAN).

== Biography ==
Silva was born in the Lisbon parish of São Cristóvão e São Lourenço (now Santa Maria Maior) on the same day that Portugal's current constitution was enacted. He is a qualified civil engineer, and a vegetarian.

He succeeded Paulo Borges as spokesperson of PAN in October 2014. In the 2015 legislative election, he was top of the party's list in the Lisbon District, and was the first PAN representative elected to the Assembly of the Republic. This made them the first new party in parliament since the Left Bloc in 1999. He was re-elected in October 2019 along with three other members of his party, allowing them the number needed to form a parliamentary group. In March 2021, Silva announced he was leaving the leadership of the party to dedicate more time to his family.

Silva left PAN in February 2024, stating that the party had lost its "backbone" by casting the decisive vote in favour of a right-leaning Social Democratic Party and CDS – People's Party government in the 2023 Madeiran regional election.
