= Paulo Raimundo =

Portuguese politician (born 1976)

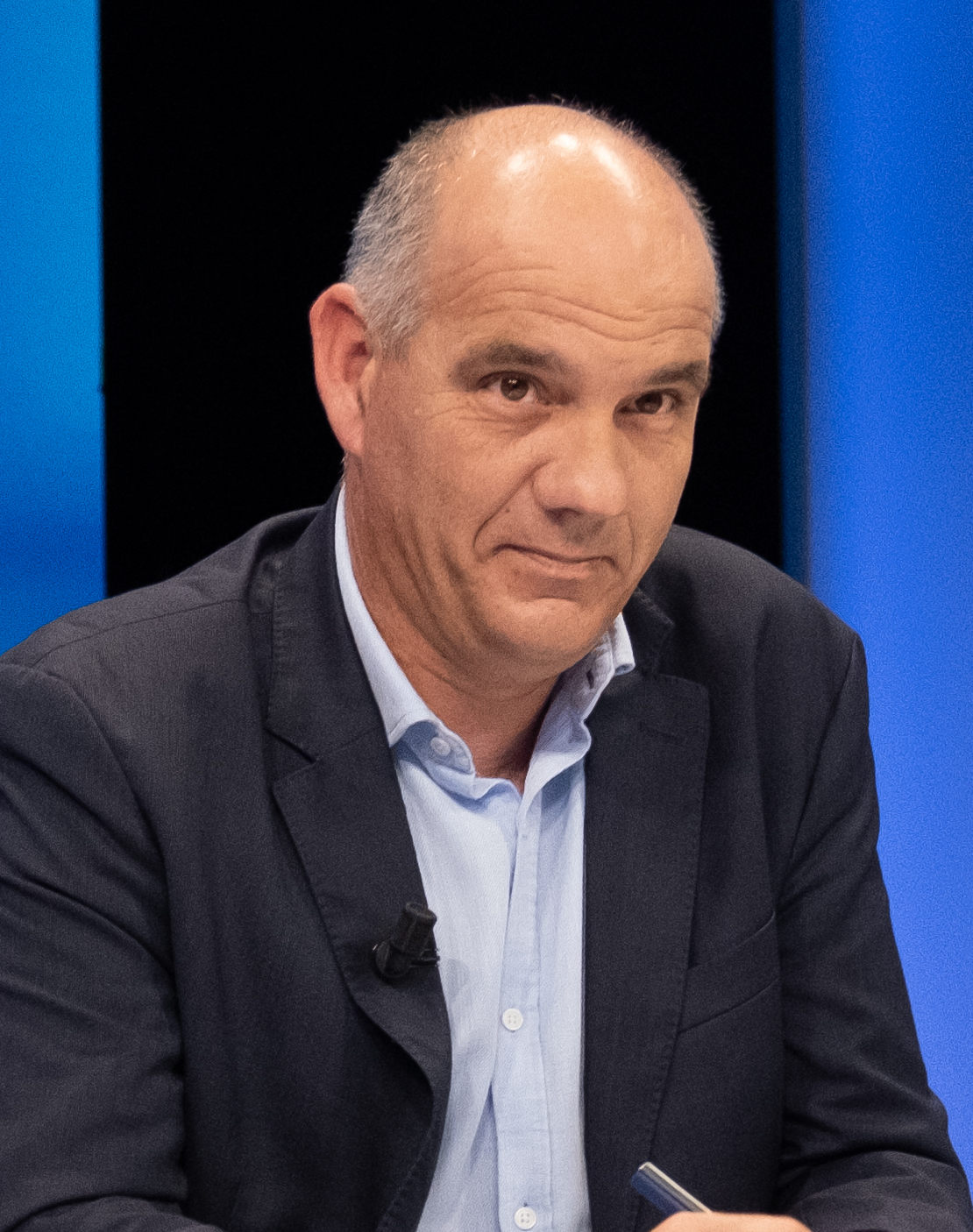
- Raimundo in 2024

General Secretary of the Portuguese Communist Party
- Incumbent
- Assumed office 12 November 2022
- Preceded by: Jerónimo de Sousa

Member of the Assembly of the Republic
- Incumbent
- Assumed office 26 March 2024
- Constituency: Lisbon

Personal details
- Born: Paulo Alexandre Cantigas Raimundo; 24 September 1976 (age 50) Cascais, Portugal
- Party: Portuguese Communist Party (1994–present)
- Other political affiliations: Portuguese Communist Youth (1991–2006)
- Children: 4
- Occupation: Politician

Paulo Alexandre Cantigas Raimundo (born 24 September 1976) is a Portuguese politician who serves as the General Secretary of the Portuguese Communist Party (PCP) since the party's National Conference in November 2022.

== Early life ==
Raimundo was born in Cascais to parents working at the GD Estoril football club. His family moved to Setúbal when he was three. In 1991, he joined the Portuguese Communist Youth, the youth wing of the PCP; he later became an official PCP member in 1994.

== Personal life ==
Raimundo is married and has four children.

== Political positions ==
Raimundo opposes the 2026 United States fuel blockade on Cuba; he referred to it as "criminal" at the 2026 Avante! Festival and urged the Portuguese government to use diplomacy to stop it.
