= Opinion polling for the 2024 Portuguese legislative election =

In the run up to the 2024 Portuguese legislative election, various organisations carried out opinion polling to gauge voting intention in Portugal. Results of such polls are displayed in this article. The date range for these opinion polls are from the 2022 Portuguese legislative election, held on 30 January, to the day the next election was held on 10 March.

== Nationwide polling ==
=== Graphical summary ===
Local Regression of polls conducted since the election

=== Polling ===
Poll results are listed in the table below in reverse chronological order, showing the most recent first. The highest percentage figure in each polling survey is displayed in bold, and the background shaded in the leading party's colour. In the instance that there is a tie, parties are shaded with their colour. The lead column on the right shows the percentage-point difference between the two parties with the highest figures. Poll results use the date the survey's fieldwork was done, as opposed to the date of publication.

Polls that show their results without distributing those respondents who are undecided or said they would abstain from voting, are re-calculated by removing these numbers from the totals through a simple rule of three, in order to obtain results comparable to other polls and the official election results.

Exit poll

Polling firm/Link	Fieldwork date	Sample size	Turnout	PS	Democratic Alliance (Portugal, 2024)		CH	IL	BE	CDU	PAN	L	O	Lead
Polling firm/Link	Fieldwork date	Sample size	Turnout	PS	PSD	CDS–PP	CH	IL	BE	CDU	PAN	L	O	Lead
**2024 legislative election**	10 Mar 2024	—N/a	59.9	28.0; 78	**28.8**; 80		18.1; 50	4.9; 8	4.4; 5	3.2; 4	2.0; 1	3.2; 4	7.5; 0	**0.8**
CESOP–UCP	10 Mar 2024	36,149	62–68	25–29; 69/77	**29–33**; 83/91		14–17; 40/46	5–7; 7/10	4–6; 5/7	2–4; 2/3	1.5– 2.5; 0/2	3–5; 4/6		4
ICS/ISCTE–GfK/Metris	10 Mar 2024	20,888	53.5– 59.5	24.2– 28.4; 68/80	**27.6–31.8**; 77/89		16.6– 20.8; 44/54	4.1– 7.3; 6/12	3.2– 6.4; 3/9	1.3– 4.5; 1/5	0.5– 3.1; 1/4	2.3– 4.9; 2/6		3.4
Pitagórica	10 Mar 2024	28,089	59.5– 64.5	24.5– 29.5; 63/75	**28.0–33.0**; 79/91		16.6– 21.6; 35/47	3.3– 6.3; 9/15	3.0– 6.0; 3/7	2.3– 5.3; 1/5	0.8– 2.8; 1/3	2.2– 5.2; 6/12		3.5
Intercampus	10 Mar 2024	24,328	57–61	23.8– 29.8; 67/79	**27.2–33.2**; 77/89		15.6– 20.6; 42/52	3.3– 7.3; 6/12	2.7– 6.7; 4/10	1.2– 5.2; 1/5	0.5– 3.5; 0/4	2.1– 6.1; 4/8		3.4
Duplimétrica (Note: Tracking Poll)	5–7 Mar 2024	600	?	29	**35**		15	6	5	3	1	4	2	6
Duplimétrica	4–6 Mar 2024	600	?	29	**35**		14	6	5	3	1	4	3	6
Consulmark2	1–6 Mar 2024	801	?	27.0	**29.8**		18.2	6.4	5.2	2.5	1.2	4.6	5.1	2.8
Duplimétrica	3–5 Mar 2024	600	?	28	**35**		15	6	5	4	1	4	2	7
CESOP–UCP	28 Feb–5 Mar 2024	2,405	?	28; 70/80	**34**; 88/98		16; 33/41	6; 6/10	5; 4/10	5; 4/7	1; 0/1	3; 2/3	2; 0	6
Duplimétrica	2–4 Mar 2024	600	?	27	**36**		16	5	6	3	1	4	2	9
Intercampus (Note: Results presented here exclude undecideds (6.9%). With their inclusion results are: AD: 29.3%; PS: 23.3%; CH: 15.6%; IL: 7.8%; BE: 5.5%; Livre: 4.3%; PAN: 3.7%; CDU: 2.1%; Others/Invalid: 1.4%.)	28 Feb–4 Mar 2024	802	?	25.0	**31.5**		16.8	8.4	5.9	2.3	4.0	4.6	1.5	6.5
Duplimétrica	1–3 Mar 2024	600	?	26	**35**		17	5	6	3	1	3	4	9
Duplimétrica	29 Feb–2 Mar 2024	600	?	26	**35**		17	4	6	4	1	4	3	9
Duplimétrica	28 Feb–1 Mar 2024	600	?	27	**34**		18	5	5	3	1	3	4	7
Duplimétrica	27–29 Feb 2024	600	?	27	**34**		17	5	5	2	1	4	5	7
Duplimétrica	26–28 Feb 2024	600	?	26	**32**		18	6	6	2	2	4	4	6
Duplimétrica	25–27 Feb 2024	600	?	27	**33**		17	6	5	2	2	4	4	6
Aximage	23–27 Feb 2024	809	?	**33.1**	29.6		16.7	3.9	6.6	4.0	2.0	1.7	2.4	3.5
Duplimétrica	24–26 Feb 2024	600	?	26	**33**		17	6	5	2	1	3	6 (Note: National Democratic Alternative (ADN): 1%; Others/Invalid: 5%.)	7
CESOP–UCP	22–26 Feb 2024	1,207	?	27; 69/79	**33**; 86/96		17; 33/41	6; 6/10	5; 5/7	3; 3/5	2; 2	4; 3/4	3; 0	6
Duplimétrica	23–25 Feb 2024	600	?	26	**33**		17	7	5	2	1	3	6 (Note: National Democratic Alternative (ADN): 1%; Others/Invalid: 5%.)	7
ICS/ISCTE	17–25 Feb 2024	907	?	30	**31**		17	4	5	3	2	2	6	1
Duplimétrica	22–24 Feb 2024	600	?	26	**31**		17	8	6	2	1	4	5 (Note: National Democratic Alternative (ADN): 1%; Others/Invalid: 4%.)	5
Duplimétrica	21–23 Feb 2024	600	?	**28**	**28**		20	7	6	2	1	3	5	Tie
CESOP–UCP	19–21 Feb 2024	1,284	?	29	**35**		17	6	4	2	1	3	3	6
Duplimétrica	10–20 Feb 2024	800	?	26	**29**		20	7	4	2	2	3	7	3
Intercampus (Note: Results presented here exclude undecideds (18.8%). With their inclusion results are: AD: 21.4%; PS: 21.1%; CH: 16.9%; IL: 6.8%; BE: 5.5%; Livre: 3.0%; PAN: 2.5%; CDU: 2.4%; Others/Invalid: 1.6%.)	8–17 Feb 2024	1,203	?	26.0	**26.4**		20.8	8.4	6.8	3.0	3.1	3.7	2.0	0.4
Aximage	8–13 Feb 2024	805	?	**33.1**	27.7		16.4	4.9	6.3	2.3	3.3	2.8	3.2	5.4
Consulmark2	6–12 Feb 2024	804	?	27.4	**30.0**		18.1	5.5	4.2	2.6	1.1	2.9	8.1	2.6
Intercampus (Note: Results presented here exclude undecideds (12.4%). With their inclusion results are: AD: 24.3%; PS: 22.4%; CH: 16.5%; IL: 6.6%; BE: 5.4%; PAN: 3.2%; CDU: 2.7%; Livre: 2.7%; Others/Invalid: 3.7%.)	6–10 Feb 2024	608	?	25.6	**27.8**		18.8	7.5	6.2	3.1	3.7	3.1	4.2	2.2
CESOP–UCP	24 Jan–1 Feb 2024	1,192	?	28	**32**		19	6	5	2	1	3	4	4
ICS/ISCTE	16–25 Jan 2024	804	?	**29**	27		21	5	5	3	1	1	8	2
Aximage	16–20 Jan 2024	801	?	**32.7**	27.4		16.2	4.2	8.0	2.6	2.9	1.9	4.1	5.3
Intercampus (Note: Results presented here exclude undecideds (14.5%). With their inclusion results are: PS: 26.4%; AD: 20.8%; CH: 16.6%; BE: 7.4%; IL: 5.4%; CDU: 3.9%; PAN: 2.2%; Livre: 1.3%; Others/Invalid: 1.5%.)	16–20 Jan 2024	637	?	**30.9**	24.3		19.4	6.3	8.7	4.6	2.6	1.5	1.8	6.6
Consulmark2	11–17 Jan 2024	801	?	26.7	**28.1**		17.5	6.3	7.2	3.3	1.2	2.1	7.5	1.4
Aximage	18–23 Dec 2023	805	?	**34.1**	24.8	1.2	16.3	4.1	6.3	2.7	3.7	1.8	5.0	9.3
Intercampus (Note: Results presented here exclude undecideds (13.2%). With their inclusion results are: PS: 25.4%; PSD: 22.5%; CH: 11.6%; BE: 8.8%; IL: 6.6%; PAN: 3.0%; Livre: 2.9%; CDU: 2.3%; CDS-PP: 1.6%; Others/Invalid: 2.0%.)	18–21 Dec 2023	611	?	**29.3**	26.0	1.8	13.4	7.6	10.1	2.7	3.5	3.3	2.3	3.3
Consulmark2	17–20 Dec 2023	803	?	24.1	**37.6**		12.0	4.9	9.1	3.3	1.1	2.8	5.0	13.5
Consulmark2	17–20 Dec 2023	803	?	26.5	**27.5**	1.7	15.2	5.8	7.7	2.8	0.8	2.3	9.7	1.0
Consulmark2	30 Nov–6 Dec 2023	575	?	26.0	**30.0**	2.3	17.2	6.7	4.4	2.1	1.4	2.3	7.6	4.0
CESOP–UCP	15–24 Nov 2023	1,102	?	28	**29**	2	16	9	6	3	2	2	3	1
Aximage	18–23 Nov 2023	802	?	**32.9**	26.7	1.5	16.2	5.0	6.9	3.2	2.9	2.0	2.7	6.2
Intercampus (Note: Results presented here exclude undecideds (7.4%). With their inclusion results are: PS: 23.6%; PSD: 21.9%; CH: 13.5%; BE: 9.5%; IL: 8.4%; PAN: 4.4%; CDU: 3.2%; Livre: 3.0%; CDS-PP: 1.9%; Others/Invalid: 3.3%.)	14–17 Nov 2023	604	?	**25.5**	23.6	2.0	14.6	9.1	10.2	3.5	4.7	3.2	3.6	1.9
Aximage (Note: Results presented here exclude undecideds (5%). With their inclusion results are: PS: 26%; PSD: 25%; CH: 17%; BE: 8%; IL: 6%; CDU: 3%; PAN: 3%; Livre: 3%; CDS-PP: 1%; Others/Invalid: 2%.)	10–13 Nov 2023	504	?	**28**	27	1	18	6	9	3	3	3	2	1
Intercampus (Note: Results presented here exclude undecideds (19.1%). With their inclusion results are: PSD: 21.8%; PS: 17.9%; CH: 13.0%; BE: 7.9%; IL: 7.0%; CDU: 3.2%; Livre: 2.7%; PAN: 2.3%; CDS-PP: 2.0%; Others/Invalid: 2.9%.)	7–8 Nov 2023	602	?	22.2	**27.0**	2.5	16.1	8.7	9.8	4.0	2.8	3.3	3.6	4.8
Aximage	18–24 Oct 2023	805	?	**28.6**	24.9	1.6	14.6	6.7	7.1	3.8	4.8	2.9	5.0	3.7
Intercampus (Note: Results presented here exclude undecideds (7.7%). With their inclusion results are: PSD: 25.7%; PS: 25.2%; CH: 11.7%; IL: 8.3%; BE: 6.7%; CDU: 4.1%; PAN: 3.2%; CDS-PP: 1.6%; Livre: 1.4%; Others/Invalid: 4.3%.)	18–23 Oct 2023	604	?	27.3	**27.9**	1.7	12.7	9.0	7.3	4.4	3.5	1.5	4.7	0.6
Aximage (Note: Results presented here exclude undecideds (5.9%). With their inclusion results are: PS: 27.6%; PSD: 24.1%; CH: 12.8%; BE: 6.7%; IL: 5.0%; CDU: 4.0%; PAN: 3.4%; Livre: 2.6%; CDS-PP: 2.4%; Others/Invalid: 5.5%.)	2–5 Oct 2023	601	?	**29.3**	25.6	2.6	13.6	5.3	7.1	4.3	3.6	2.8	5.8	3.7
ICS/ISCTE	16–25 Sep 2023	804	?	**31**	25	2	13	3	6	6	2	2	10	6
Intercampus (Note: Results presented here exclude undecideds (13.9%). With their inclusion results are: PS: 25.8%; PSD: 24.6%; CH: 11.0%; IL: 8.0%; BE: 5.5%; CDU: 3.7%; Livre: 2.0%; PAN: 1.8%; CDS-PP: 0.7%; Others/Invalid: 3.0%.)	9–14 Sep 2023	614	?	**30.0**	28.6	0.8	12.8	9.3	6.4	4.3	2.1	2.3	3.4	1.4
Intercampus (Note: Results presented here exclude undecideds (15.3%). With their inclusion results are: PS: 23.6%; PSD: 22.5%; CH: 11.4%; IL: 7.0%; BE: 6.8%; CDU: 3.1%; PAN: 2.9%; Livre: 2.4%; CDS-PP: 0.9%; Others/Invalid: 4.1%.)	7–11 Aug 2023	607	?	**27.9**	26.6	1.1	13.4	8.3	8.0	3.7	3.4	2.8	4.8	1.3
CESOP–UCP	6–15 Jul 2023	1,006	?	32	**33**	1	10	7	7	4	1	2	3	1
Aximage	6–11 Jul 2023	800	67.9	**28.8**	27.7	1.1	13.0	5.2	8.0	3.2	3.8	2.7	6.5	1.1
Intercampus (Note: Results presented here exclude undecideds (6.8%). With their inclusion results are: PS: 23.5%; PSD: 22.8%; CH: 12.7%; IL: 9.1%; BE: 8.9%; PAN: 4.5%; CDU: 4.3%; Livre: 2.3%; CDS-PP: 1.1%; Others/Invalid: 4.1%.)	3–6 Jul 2023	623	?	**25.2**	24.5	1.2	13.6	9.8	9.5	4.6	4.8	2.5	4.3	0.7
CESOP–UCP (Note: Results presented here exclude undecideds (21%), would not vote (6%) and refused to answer (5%). With their inclusion results are: PSD: 24%; PS: 22%; CH: 6%; IL: 4%; BE: 4%; CDU: 2%; CDS-PP: 1%; Livre: 1%; PAN: <1%; Others/Invalid: 5%.)	1–21 Jun 2023	2,042	?	32	**35**	1	9	6	6	3	1	1	6	3
Intercampus (Note: Results presented here exclude undecideds (8.4%). With their inclusion results are: PSD: 24.1%; PS: 22.4%; CH: 11.8%; BE: 9.3%; IL: 8.1%; CDU: 3.8%; PAN: 3.6%; Livre: 2.2%; CDS-PP: 2.2%; Others/Invalid: 4.1%.)	25–31 May 2023	611	?	24.5	**26.3**	2.4	12.9	8.8	10.2	4.1	3.9	2.4	4.5	1.8
ICS/ISCTE	13–28 May 2023	1,204	?	**31**	30	1	13	4	5	5	2	1	8	1
Intercampus (Note: Results presented here exclude undecideds (17.4%). With their inclusion results are: PS: 21.2%; PSD: 21.1%; CH: 12.1%; BE: 7.9%; IL: 6.9%; CDU: 3.5%; PAN: 2.0%; Livre: 1.9%; CDS-PP: 1.5%; Others/Invalid: 4.5%.)	4–5 May 2023	606	?	**25.7**	25.5	1.8	14.7	8.4	9.6	4.2	2.4	2.3	5.4	0.2
Aximage	10–14 Apr 2023	805	70.2	28.3	**28.6**	1.3	12.1	6.1	6.3	3.5	4.5	2.7	6.6	0.3
Intercampus (Note: Results presented here exclude undecideds (10.4%). With their inclusion results are: PS: 25.2%; PSD: 24.1%; CH: 13.2%; IL: 7.3%; BE: 7.0%; CDU: 4.3%; PAN: 2.3%; CDS-PP: 1.4%; Livre: 1.1%; Others/Invalid: 3.7%.)	6–12 Apr 2023	610	?	**28.1**	26.9	1.6	14.7	8.2	7.8	4.8	2.6	1.2	4.1	1.2
ICS/ISCTE	11–20 Mar 2023	807	?	**30**	**30**	2	13	4	5	5	2	1	8	Tie
Intercampus (Note: Results presented here exclude undecideds (11.3%). With their inclusion results are: PS: 25.2%; PSD: 24.2%; CH: 13.5%; IL: 7.0%; BE: 6.4%; CDU: 3.2%; Livre: 2.4%; PAN: 1.5%; CDS-PP: 1.3%; Others/Invalid: 4.0%.)	9–15 Mar 2023	613	?	**28.4**	27.3	1.5	15.2	7.9	7.2	3.6	1.7	2.7	4.5	1.1
CESOP–UCP	9–17 Feb 2023	1,002	?	**32**	31	1	11	8	7	4	2	2	2	1
Intercampus (Note: Results presented here exclude undecideds (17.5%). With their inclusion results are: PS: 23.4%; PSD: 22.8%; CH: 11.6%; IL: 7.4%; BE: 4.8%; CDU: 3.9%; PAN: 2.4%; Livre: 1.3%; CDS-PP: 0.9%; Others/Invalid: 4.0%.)	3–10 Feb 2023	602	?	**28.4**	27.6	1.1	14.1	9.0	5.8	4.7	2.9	1.6	4.8	0.8
Pitagórica	11–17 Jan 2023	828	?	26.9	**30.6**	0.0	14.2	8.0	5.6	2.2	0.9	1.9	9.7	3.7
Aximage	10–14 Jan 2023	805	65.1	**27.1**	25.1	1.4	12.9	9.5	6.6	4.8	3.1	3.4	6.1	2.0
Intercampus (Note: Results presented here exclude undecideds (15.5%). With their inclusion results are: PS: 26.3%; PSD: 24.9%; CH: 9.0%; IL: 6.4%; BE: 6.3%; CDU: 3.1%; PAN: 3.1%; Livre: 2.0%; CDS-PP: 0.6%; Others/Invalid: 2.8%.)	6–11 Jan 2023	605	?	**31.1**	29.5	0.7	10.7	7.6	7.5	3.7	3.7	2.4	3.3	1.6
Pitagórica	9–15 Dec 2022	828	?	**35.9**	30.4	0.7	9.1	5.2	3.4	4.3	0.6	2.2	8.2	5.5
ICS/ISCTE	3–15 Dec 2022	809	?	**37**	29	0	9	2	7	5	3	0	8	8
Intercampus (Note: Results presented here exclude undecideds (12.7%). With their inclusion results are: PS: 27.0%; PSD: 22.1%; CH: 9.6%; IL: 7.5%; BE: 7.5%; CDU: 3.8%; PAN: 3.1%; CDS-PP: 1.9%; Livre: 1.7%; Others/Invalid: 3.0%.)	12–14 Dec 2022	663	?	**30.9**	25.3	2.2	11.0	8.6	8.6	4.4	3.6	1.9	3.5	5.6
Intercampus (Note: Results presented here exclude undecideds (15.9%). With their inclusion results are: PS: 24.2%; PSD: 22.0%; CH: 11.4%; IL: 6.7%; BE: 6.1%; CDU: 5.4%; Livre: 2.3%; PAN: 2.3%; CDS-PP: 1.3%; Others/Invalid: 2.3%.)	15–20 Nov 2022	605	?	**28.8**	26.2	1.6	13.6	8.0	7.3	6.4	2.7	2.7	2.7	2.6
Pitagórica	11–17 Nov 2022	828	?	**35.1**	30.4	1.3	8.2	6.1	3.8	5.1	1.2	2.0	6.8	4.7
Intercampus (Note: Results presented here exclude undecideds (14.9%). With their inclusion results are: PS: 28.3%; PSD: 24.8%; CH: 9.2%; IL: 7.3%; BE: 6.1%; CDU: 2.6%; Livre: 2.2%; PAN: 1.8%; CDS-PP: 0.6%; Others/Invalid: 2.4%.)	17–22 Oct 2022	607	?	**33.2**	29.1	0.7	10.8	8.6	7.1	3.0	2.1	2.6	2.8	4.1
Pitagórica	11–17 Oct 2022	828	?	**36.2**	30.0	1.6	9.3	7.9	3.9	3.8	1.2	1.0	5.1	6.2
Aximage	21–24 Sep 2022	810	59.2	**34.5**	30.9	1.9	8.9	6.7	3.8	3.2	3.0	2.1	5.0	3.6
ICS/ISCTE	10–18 Sep 2022	807	?	**37**	28	0	11	3	4	4	3	0	10	9
Intercampus (Note: Results presented here exclude undecideds (13.9%). With their inclusion results are: PS: 30.6%; PSD: 24.7%; CH: 9.2%; IL: 5.2%; BE: 5.2%; CDU: 2.9%; PAN: 2.5%; Livre: 1.8%; CDS-PP: 1.3%; Others/Invalid: 2.9%.)	9–15 Sep 2022	606	?	**35.5**	28.7	1.3	10.7	6.0	6.0	3.4	2.9	2.1	3.4	6.8
Intercampus (Note: Results presented here exclude undecideds (14.0%). With their inclusion results are: PS: 33.1%; PSD: 22.8%; CH: 8.4%; IL: 7.1%; BE: 5.0%; CDU: 2.2%; Livre: 1.9%; PAN: 1.3%; CDS-PP: 0.7%; Others/Invalid: 3.4%.)	3–10 Aug 2022	605	?	**38.5**	26.5	0.8	9.8	8.3	5.8	2.6	1.5	2.2	4.0	12.0
Pitagórica	28 Jul–10 Aug 2022	828	?	**36.7**	27.6	2.5	9.5	8.5	4.4	4.2	1.5	1.5	3.6	9.1
CESOP–UCP	11–15 Jul 2022	885	?	**38**	30	1	9	6	5	5	1	2	3	8
Intercampus (Note: Results presented here exclude undecideds (11.8%). With their inclusion results are: PS: 35.1%; PSD: 19.8%; IL: 8.5%; CH: 8.3%; BE: 5.4%; CDU: 2.8%; PAN: 2.2%; CDS-PP: 2.0%; Livre: 1.9%; Others/Invalid: 2.4%.)	6–11 Jul 2022	605	?	**39.8**	22.5	2.3	9.4	9.6	6.1	3.2	2.5	1.9	2.7	17.3
Aximage	5–10 Jul 2022	810	57.2	**35.8**	30.1	1.4	10.2	6.1	5.6	3.3	1.9	2.0	3.6	5.7
Pitagórica	21 Jun–4 Jul 2022	828	?	**38.9**	24.9	1.8	8.3	8.6	5.3	3.9	1.2	1.8	5.3	14.0
Intercampus (Note: Results presented here exclude undecideds (11.6%). With their inclusion results are: PS: 34.3%; PSD: 21.7%; CH: 8.2%; IL: 6.9%; BE: 5.2%; CDU: 3.2%; PAN: 2.7%; CDS-PP: 2.7%; Livre: 1.2%; Others/Invalid: 2.3%.)	8–14 Jun 2022	611	?	**38.8**	24.6	3.0	9.3	7.8	5.9	3.6	3.0	1.4	2.6	14.2
Intercampus (Note: Results presented here exclude undecideds (12.6%). With their inclusion results are: PS: 34.5%; PSD: 18.5%; CH: 7.7%; IL: 6.8%; BE: 5.2%; CDU: 3.6%; PAN: 3.6%; CDS-PP: 2.9%; Livre: 1.8%; Others/Invalid: 2.9%.)	7–15 May 2022	611	?	**39.5**	21.2	3.3	8.8	7.8	5.9	4.1	4.1	2.1	3.2	18.3
Aximage	12–18 Apr 2022	807	?	**40.7**	25.2	2.2	7.8	7.9	4.0	4.1	1.5	1.5	5.1	15.5
Pitagórica	15–20 Feb 2022	600	?	**37.1**	31.7	1.4	5.6	7.3	4.5	4.3	1.3	2.7	4.1	5.4
**2022 legislative election**	30 Jan 2022	—N/a	51.5	**41.4**; 120	29.1; 77	1.6; 0	7.2; 12	4.9; 8	4.4; 5	4.3; 6	1.6; 1	1.3; 1	4.3; 0	**12.3**

==== Other scenarios ====
Hypothetical polling

Jorge Moreira da Silva as PSD leader

Polling firm/Link	Fieldwork date	Sample size	Turnout	PS	Jorge Moreira da Silva	CH	IL	BE	CDU	CDS–PP	PAN	L	O	Lead
Pitagórica	7–24 Apr 2022	625	?	**42.3**	19.9	6.4	10.3	5.1	4.5	1.7	1.1	2.4	6.3	22.4
**2022 legislative election**	30 Jan 2022	—N/a	51.5	**41.4**; 120	29.1; 77	7.2; 12	4.9; 8	4.4; 5	4.3; 6	1.6; 0	1.6; 1	1.3; 1	4.3; 0	**12.3**

Luís Montenegro as PSD leader

Polling firm/Link	Fieldwork date	Sample size	Turnout	PS	Luís Montenegro	CH	IL	BE	CDU	CDS–PP	PAN	L	O	Lead
Pitagórica	7–24 Apr 2022	625	?	**41.5**	21.6	5.7	10.0	5.1	4.3	2.0	1.4	2.4	6.0	19.9
**2022 legislative election**	30 Jan 2022	—N/a	51.5	**41.4**; 120	29.1; 77	7.2; 12	4.9; 8	4.4; 5	4.3; 6	1.6; 0	1.6; 1	1.3; 1	4.3; 0	**12.3**

Luís Montenegro as PSD leader and Nuno Melo as CDS-PP leader

Polling firm/Link	Fieldwork date	Sample size	Turnout	PS	Luís Montenegro	CH	IL	BE	CDU	Nuno Melo	PAN	L	O	Lead
Pitagórica	15–20 Feb 2022	600	?	**36.5**	30.6	4.2	7.2	4.4	4.4	5.3	1.3	2.5	3.6	5.9
**2022 legislative election**	30 Jan 2022	—N/a	51.5	**41.4**; 120	29.1; 77	7.2; 12	4.9; 8	4.4; 5	4.3; 6	1.6; 0	1.6; 1	1.3; 1	4.3; 0	**12.3**

Pedro Nuno Santos as PS leader

Polling firm/Link	Fieldwork date	Sample size	Turnout	PS	PSD	CH	IL	BE	CDU	CDS–PP	PAN	L	O	Lead
ICS/ISCTE	18–27 Nov 2023	803	?	**29**	26	15	6	6	4	1	3	1	3	5.9
**2022 legislative election**	30 Jan 2022	—N/a	51.5	**41.4**; 120	29.1; 77	7.2; 12	4.9; 8	4.4; 5	4.3; 6	1.6; 0	1.6; 1	1.3; 1	4.3; 0	**12.3**

José Luís Carneiro as PS leader

Polling firm/Link	Fieldwork date	Sample size	Turnout	PS	PSD	CH	IL	BE	CDU	CDS–PP	PAN	L	O	Lead
ICS/ISCTE	18–27 Nov 2023	803	?	**30**	25	15	6	5	3	2	3	2	3	5.9
**2022 legislative election**	30 Jan 2022	—N/a	51.5	**41.4**; 120	29.1; 77	7.2; 12	4.9; 8	4.4; 5	4.3; 6	1.6; 0	1.6; 1	1.3; 1	4.3; 0	**12.3**

PSD/CDS–PP/IL coalition

Polling firm/Link	Fieldwork date	Sample size	Turnout	PS	PSD/CDS IL			CH	BE	CDU	PAN	L	O	Lead
Polling firm/Link	Fieldwork date	Sample size	Turnout	PS	PSD	CDS–PP	IL	CH	BE	CDU	PAN	L	O	Lead
Consulmark2	17–20 Dec 2023	803	?	24.3	**42.0**			12.8	8.5	3.5	0.9	3.2	4.9	17.7
**2022 legislative election**	30 Jan 2022	—N/a	51.5	**41.4**; 120	29.1; 77	1.6; 0	4.9; 8	7.2; 12	4.4; 5	4.3; 6	1.6; 1	1.3; 1	4.3; 0	**12.3**

== Constituency polling ==
=== Madeira ===
Unlike the rest of the country, in Madeira, the PSD and CDS–PP contested the election under a coalition called Madeira First, while PPM presented a list of its own.

Polling firm/Link	Fieldwork date	Sample size	Turnout	PSD/CDS	PS		CH	IL	BE	CDU	PAN	L	ADN	O	Lead
2024 legislative election	10 Mar 2024	—N/a	58.9	35.4; 3	19.8; 2	9.6; 0	17.6; 1	3.9; 0	2.9; 0	1.6; 0	2.1; 0	1.2; 0	1.6; 0	2.0; 0	15.6
Intercampus (Note: Results presented here exclude undecideds (15.1%). With their inclusion results are: PSD/CDS: 29.4%; PS: 18.9%; CH: 8.4%; IL: 7.7%; JPP: 5.4%; CDU: 3.1%; BE: 2.8%; ADN: 2.3%; Livre: 1.5%; PAN: 1.5%; Others/Invalid: 3.8%.)	26 Feb–3 Mar 2024	401	?	34.6; 3	22.3; 2	6.4; 0	9.9; 1	9.1; 0	3.3; 0	3.7; 0	1.8; 0	1.8; 0	2.7; 0	4.4; 0	12.3
Aximage	21–29 Feb 2024	512	?	46.5; 3	24.9; 2	5.1; 0	12.4; 1	4.0; 0	2.7; 0	0.7; 0	1.6; 0	0.9; 0	—N/a	1.2; 0	21.6
2023 regional election	24 Sep 2023	—N/a	53.3	43.1 (4)	21.3 (2)	11.0 (0)	8.9 (0)	2.6 (0)	2.2 (0)	2.7 (0)	2.2 (0)	0.6 (0)	0.5 (0)	2.2 (0)	21.8
2022 legislative election	30 Jan 2022	—N/a	50.3	39.8; 3	31.5; 3	6.9; 0	6.1; 0	5.6; 0	3.2; 0	2.0; 0	1.6; 0	0.7; 0	0.4; 0	2.2; 0	8.3

== Leadership polls ==
=== Preferred prime minister ===
Poll results showing public opinion on who would make the best prime minister or who is better positioned to win are shown in the table below in reverse chronological order, showing the most recent first.

==== Pedro Nuno Santos vs Luís Montenegro ====
Polling firm/Link	Fieldwork date	Pedro Nuno Santos	Luís Montenegro	N	Both/ O	NO	Lead
Intercampus	28 Feb–4 Mar 2024	30.8	44.1	—N/a	—N/a	25.1	13.3
CESOP–UCP	19–21 Feb 2024	34	46	—N/a	—N/a	20	12
Intercampus	6–10 Feb 2024	30.0	40.6	—N/a	—N/a	29.4	10.6
Intercampus	16–20 Jan 2024	36.3	31.2	—N/a	—N/a	32.5	5.1
Consulmark2	11–17 Jan 2024	31.1	34.8	—N/a	22.3	11.7	3.7
Aximage	18–23 Dec 2023	37	34	—N/a	—N/a	29	3
Intercampus	18–21 Dec 2023	28.2	24.1	31.4	4.1	12.2	4.1
CESOP–UCP	15–24 Nov 2023	39	40	—N/a	—N/a	21	1
Aximage	18–23 Nov 2023	47	31	—N/a	—N/a	22	16
Intercampus	14–17 Nov 2023	35.9	30.7	—N/a	—N/a	33.4	5.2
Aximage	10–13 Nov 2023	33	40	—N/a	—N/a	27	7
Intercampus	6–12 Apr 2023	27.0	44.9	—N/a	—N/a	28.1	17.9

==== António Costa vs Luís Montenegro ====
Polling firm/Link	Fieldwork date	António Costa	Luís Montenegro	N	Both/ O	NO	Lead
Aximage	18–24 Oct 2023	34	20	40	1	5	14
Aximage	2–5 Oct 2023	26	22	39	6	7	4
Aximage	6–11 Jul 2023	37	20	38	2	3	17
Aximage	10–14 Apr 2023	38	21	34	2	5	17
Intercampus	9–15 Mar 2023	40.6	26.8	5.2	—N/a	27.4	13.8
Aximage	10–14 Jan 2023	38	19	37	1	5	19
Aximage	21–24 Sep 2022	38	20	30	1	11	18
Intercampus (Note: Question: Between Montenegro and Costa, which would be the best Prime Minister to face the economic crisis?)	9–15 Sep 2022	43.6	30.0	3.6	—N/a	22.8	13.6
Aximage	5–10 Jul 2022	45	17	28	2	8	28

==== Other scenarios ====
Hypothetical polling

José Luís Carneiro vs Luís Montenegro

Polling firm/Link	Fieldwork date	José Luís Carneiro	Luís Montenegro	N	Both/ O	NO	Lead
CESOP–UCP	15–24 Nov 2023	42	37	—N/a	—N/a	21	5
Aximage	18–23 Nov 2023	38	37	—N/a	—N/a	25	1
Intercampus	14–17 Nov 2023	34.2	30.4	—N/a	—N/a	35.4	3.8
Aximage	10–13 Nov 2023	28	43	—N/a	—N/a	29	15

Possible PS candidates vs Luís Montenegro

Polling firm/Link	Fieldwork date	Marta Temido	Mariana Vieira da Silva	Fernando Medina	Duarte Cordeiro	Luís Montenegro	N	Both/ O	NO	Lead
Intercampus	6–12 Apr 2023	36.9	—N/a	—N/a	—N/a	42.0	—N/a	—N/a	21.1	5.1
Intercampus	6–12 Apr 2023	—N/a	30.7	—N/a	—N/a	43.4	—N/a	—N/a	25.9	12.7
Intercampus	6–12 Apr 2023	—N/a	—N/a	22.1	—N/a	49.8	—N/a	—N/a	28.1	27.7
Intercampus	6–12 Apr 2023	—N/a	—N/a	—N/a	20.8	46.1	—N/a	—N/a	33.1	25.3

=== Party leaders' ratings ===
Poll results showing the public opinion on all political party leaders rated from 0 to 10 (Note: Intercampus and Aximage polls rate party leaders from 1 to 5. CESOP–UCP poll rates party leaders from 0 to 20. The results are adapted to match the ICS/ISCTE polls.) (with the former being strong disapproval and the latter strong approval) are shown in the table below in reverse chronological order (showing the most recent first).

Polling firm/Link	Fieldwork date	António Costa	Pedro Nuno Santos	Rui Rio	Luís Montenegro	André Ventura	João Cotrim de Figueiredo	Debate com Rui Rocha na CNN, Fev.2024 (53539434166) (cropped) (cropped)	Catarina Martins	Mariana Mortágua	Jerónimo de Sousa	Paulo Raimundo	Nuno Melo	Inês Sousa Real	Rui Tavares	Lead
Intercampus	29 Feb–4 Mar 2024	—N/a	5.2	—N/a	6.0	4.6	—N/a	5.8	—N/a	5.2	—N/a	4.6	5.2	5.6	5.8	0.2
Intercampus	6–10 Feb 2024	—N/a	5.0	—N/a	5.4	4.6	—N/a	5.4	—N/a	5.4	—N/a	4.6	5.2	5.4	5.4	Tie
ICS/ISCTE	16–25 Jan 2024	—N/a	4.3	—N/a	4.0	3.4	—N/a	2.9	—N/a	3.8	—N/a	2.7	3.0	2.9	2.9	0.3
Intercampus	16–20 Jan 2024	—N/a	5.0	—N/a	5.0	4.6	—N/a	5.2	—N/a	5.4	—N/a	4.6	5.0	5.2	5.4	Tie
Intercampus	18–21 Dec 2023	—N/a	5.4	—N/a	5.6	4.6	—N/a	5.8	—N/a	5.8	—N/a	5.3	5.4	5.4	6.0	0.2
Intercampus	14–17 Nov 2023	4.8	—N/a	—N/a	5.2	4.6	—N/a	5.6	—N/a	5.6	—N/a	4.8	5.0	5.6	5.6	Tie
Intercampus	18–23 Oct 2023	4.8	—N/a	—N/a	5.2	4.4	—N/a	5.6	—N/a	5.6	—N/a	4.6	5.0	5.4	5.6	Tie
ICS/ISCTE	16–25 Sep 2023	4.6	—N/a	—N/a	3.6	2.9	—N/a	3.2	—N/a	3.8	—N/a	2.9	2.7	2.7	3.1	0.8
Intercampus	9–14 Sep 2023	5.2	—N/a	—N/a	5.4	4.4	—N/a	5.4	—N/a	5.4	—N/a	4.6	4.8	5.0	5.4	Tie
Intercampus	7–11 Aug 2023	5.4	—N/a	—N/a	5.6	4.4	—N/a	5.4	—N/a	5.4	—N/a	4.8	5.0	5.4	5.4	0.2
CESOP–UCP	6–15 Jul 2023	5.1	—N/a	—N/a	5.2	3.5	—N/a	4.7	—N/a	5.4	—N/a	4.4	—N/a	4.5	5.1	0.2
Intercampus	3–6 Jul 2023	5.2	—N/a	—N/a	5.6	4.6	—N/a	5.6	—N/a	5.8	—N/a	4.8	5.2	5.6	5.6	0.2
Intercampus	25–31 May 2023	5.0	—N/a	—N/a	5.8	4.6	—N/a	6.0	5.8	—N/a	—N/a	5.0	5.4	5.6	5.8	0.2
ICS/ISCTE	13–28 May 2023	4.8	—N/a	—N/a	3.9	3.0	—N/a	3.2	4.1	—N/a	—N/a	3.2	—N/a	3.3	3.3	0.7
Aximage	10–14 Apr 2023	4.8	—N/a	—N/a	5.2	5.0	—N/a	5.8	5.4	—N/a	—N/a	4.8	5.2	5.6	6.0	0.2
Intercampus	6–12 Apr 2023	5.2	—N/a	—N/a	5.6	4.4	—N/a	5.6	5.2	—N/a	—N/a	4.6	5.2	5.4	5.4	Tie
ICS/ISCTE	11–20 Mar 2023	4.6	—N/a	—N/a	4.2	3.4	—N/a	3.1	4.1	—N/a	—N/a	3.2	—N/a	3.3	3.5	0.4
Intercampus	9–15 Mar 2023	5.2	—N/a	—N/a	5.4	4.6	—N/a	5.2	5.2	—N/a	—N/a	4.4	4.8	5.0	5.2	0.2
Intercampus	3–10 Feb 2023	5.2	—N/a	—N/a	5.6	4.8	5.6	—N/a	5.0	—N/a	—N/a	4.6	4.8	5.0	5.4	Tie
Aximage	10–14 Jan 2023	4.8	—N/a	—N/a	5.2	4.8	6.2	—N/a	5.6	—N/a	—N/a	5.4	5.2	5.4	6.0	0.2
Intercampus	6–11 Jan 2023	5.2	—N/a	—N/a	5.8	4.6	5.6	—N/a	5.2	—N/a	—N/a	4.8	5.0	5.2	5.4	0.2
ICS/ISCTE	3–15 Dec 2022	5.4	—N/a	—N/a	4.5	3.0	3.9	—N/a	4.5	—N/a	—N/a	3.6	—N/a	3.8	3.7	0.9
Intercampus	12–14 Dec 2022	5.8	—N/a	—N/a	5.8	4.4	5.8	—N/a	5.4	—N/a	—N/a	4.8	5.2	5.2	5.4	Tie
Intercampus	15–20 Nov 2022	5.6	—N/a	—N/a	5.6	4.2	5.6	—N/a	5.0	—N/a	4.4	—N/a	5.0	5.0	5.2	Tie
Intercampus	17–22 Oct 2022	5.6	—N/a	—N/a	5.6	4.4	5.6	—N/a	5.0	—N/a	4.0	—N/a	4.8	4.8	5.0	Tie
ICS/ISCTE	10–18 Sep 2022	5.3	—N/a	—N/a	4.4	3.0	3.8	—N/a	3.9	—N/a	2.9	—N/a	—N/a	3.3	3.6	0.9
Intercampus	9–15 Sep 2022	6.0	—N/a	—N/a	5.8	4.4	5.6	—N/a	5.0	—N/a	4.0	—N/a	5.0	5.0	5.2	0.2
Intercampus	3–10 Aug 2022	5.8	—N/a	—N/a	5.6	4.2	5.6	—N/a	5.0	—N/a	3.8	—N/a	4.8	4.8	5.2	0.2
Intercampus	6–11 Jul 2022	6.0	—N/a	—N/a	5.6	4.2	5.8	—N/a	5.2	—N/a	3.8	—N/a	5.0	5.2	5.4	0.2
Intercampus	8–14 Jun 2022	6.4	—N/a	—N/a	5.6	4.2	5.8	—N/a	5.2	—N/a	4.0	—N/a	5.2	5.2	5.6	0.6
ICS/ISCTE	11 Feb–7 Mar 2022	6.0	—N/a	4.0	—N/a	2.3	3.6	—N/a	4.0	—N/a	3.7	—N/a	—N/a	3.3	2.5	2.0

=== Cabinet approval/disapproval ratings ===
==== Graphical summary ====
View source data.

==== Polling ====
Poll results showing public opinion on the performance of the Government are shown in the table below in reverse chronological order, showing the most recent first.

Polling firm/Link	Fieldwork date	Sample size	António Costa's cabinet				
Polling firm/Link	Fieldwork date	Sample size	Approve	Disapprove	Neither	No opinion	Lead
Intercampus	6–10 Feb 2024	608	16.5	60.3	22.0	1.2	38.3
ICS/ISCTE	16–25 Jan 2024	804	26	69	—N/a	5	43
Intercampus	16–20 Jan 2024	637	19.0	57.3	21.8	1.9	35.5
Intercampus	18–21 Dec 2023	611	21.3	49.6	25.2	3.9	24.4
ICS/ISCTE	18–27 Nov 2023	803	27	69	—N/a	4	42
Intercampus	14–17 Nov 2023	602	16.9	61.3	21.4	0.3	39.9
Aximage	18–24 Oct 2023	805	25	56	17	2	31
Intercampus	18–23 Oct 2023	604	17.4	60.0	21.7	0.9	38.3
ICS/ISCTE	16–25 Sep 2023	804	28	66	—N/a	6	38
Intercampus	9–14 Sep 2023	614	21.2	52.4	24.6	1.8	27.8
Intercampus	7–11 Aug 2023	607	20.5	50.8	27.8	0.9	23.0
CESOP–UCP	6–15 Jul 2023	1,006	9	52	38	1	14
Aximage	6–11 Jul 2023	800	26	54	16	4	28
Intercampus	3–6 Jul 2023	623	21.8	54.1	23.0	1.1	31.1
Intercampus	25–31 May 2023	611	14.7	60.1	24.1	1.1	36.0
ICS/ISCTE	13–28 May 2023	1,204	25	71	—N/a	4	46
Aximage	10–14 Apr 2023	805	23	60	15	2	37
Intercampus	6–12 Apr 2023	610	20.4	56.6	22.0	1.0	34.6
ICS/ISCTE	11–20 Mar 2023	807	29	64	—N/a	7	35
Intercampus	9–15 Mar 2023	613	21.6	55.3	20.9	2.2	33.7
CESOP–UCP	9–17 Feb 2023	1,002	7.0	52.2	38.9	1.9	13.3
Intercampus	3–10 Feb 2023	602	17.8	54.6	25.7	1.8	28.9
Pitagórica	11–17 Jan 2023	828	12	53	34	1	19
Aximage	10–14 Jan 2023	805	20	59	18	3	39
Intercampus	6–11 Jan 2023	605	19.1	54.4	24.6	1.8	29.8
Pitagórica	9–15 Dec 2022	828	17	41	40	2	1
ICS/ISCTE	3–15 Dec 2022	809	41	52	—N/a	6	11
Pitagórica	11–17 Nov 2022	828	19	32	47	2	15
Intercampus	17–22 Oct 2022	607	29.4	42.7	26.5	1.4	13.3
Pitagórica	11–17 Oct 2022	828	15	42	41	2	1
Aximage	21–24 Sep 2022	810	30	48	17	5	18
ICS/ISCTE	10–18 Sep 2022	807	42	49	—N/a	9	7
Intercampus	9–15 Sep 2022	606	29.5	40.8	27.2	2.5	11.3
Intercampus	3–10 Aug 2022	605	29.9	36.0	31.7	2.4	4.3
Pitagórica	28 Jul–10 Aug 2022	828	19	42	37	2	5
CESOP–UCP	11–15 Jul 2022	885	10	37	50	3	13
Intercampus	6–11 Jul 2022	605	32.0	40.0	25.6	2.4	8.0
Aximage	5–10 Jul 2022	810	35	43	17	5	8
Pitagórica	21 Jun–4 Jul 2022	828	18	34	47	1	13
Intercampus	8–14 Jun 2022	611	36.4	33.2	29.3	1.1	3.2
Intercampus	7–15 May 2022	611	40.1	27.2	31.1	1.6	9.0
Pitagórica	7–24 Apr 2022	625	28	27	41	4	13
Aximage	12–18 Apr 2022	807	45	27	21	7	18
