= 2024 Portuguese legislative election =

- 10 March 2024

All 230 seats in the Assembly of the Republic 116 seats needed for a majority
- Opinion polls
- Registered: 10,813,643 0.0%
- Turnout: 6,476,952 (59.9%) ▲8.4 pp
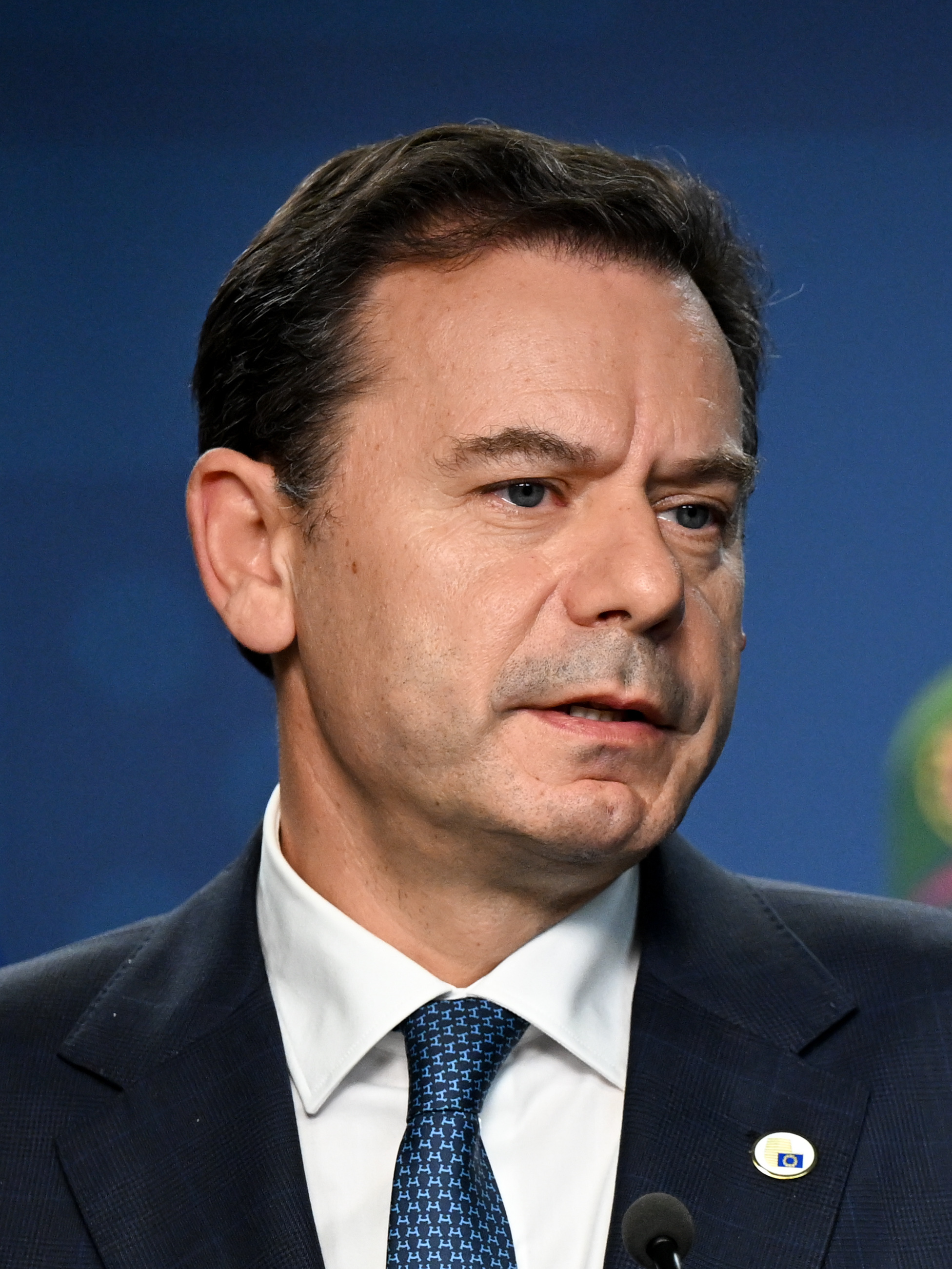

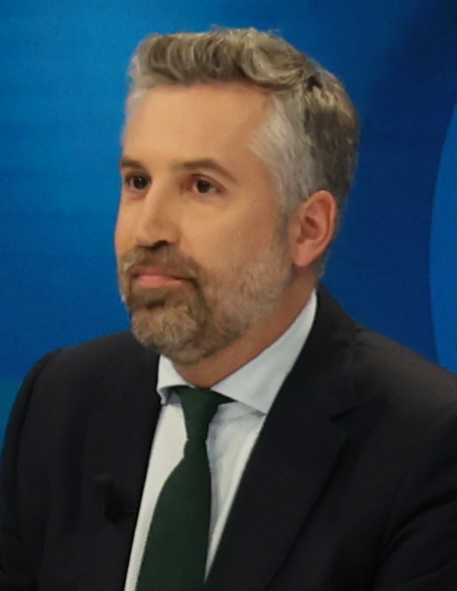

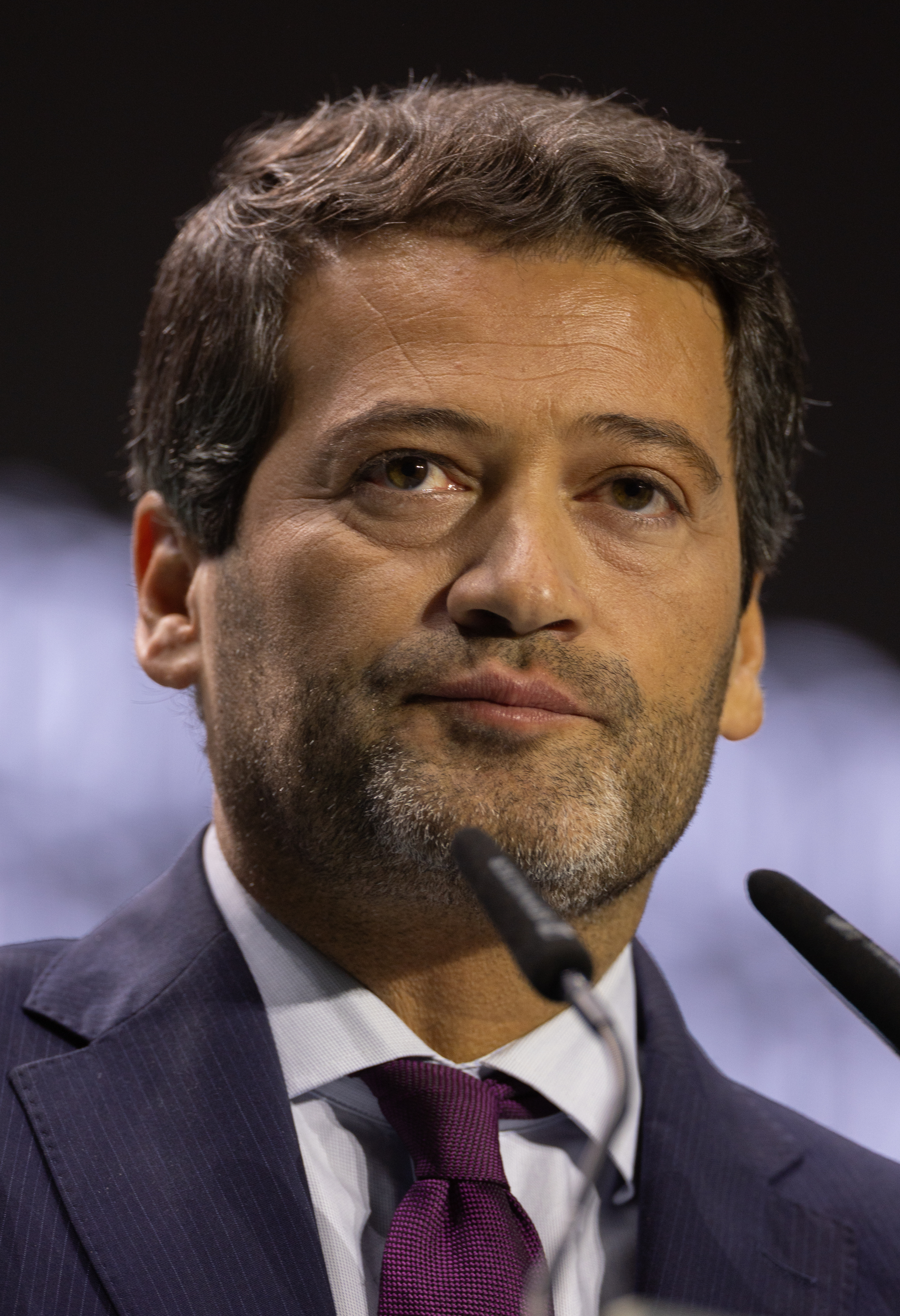

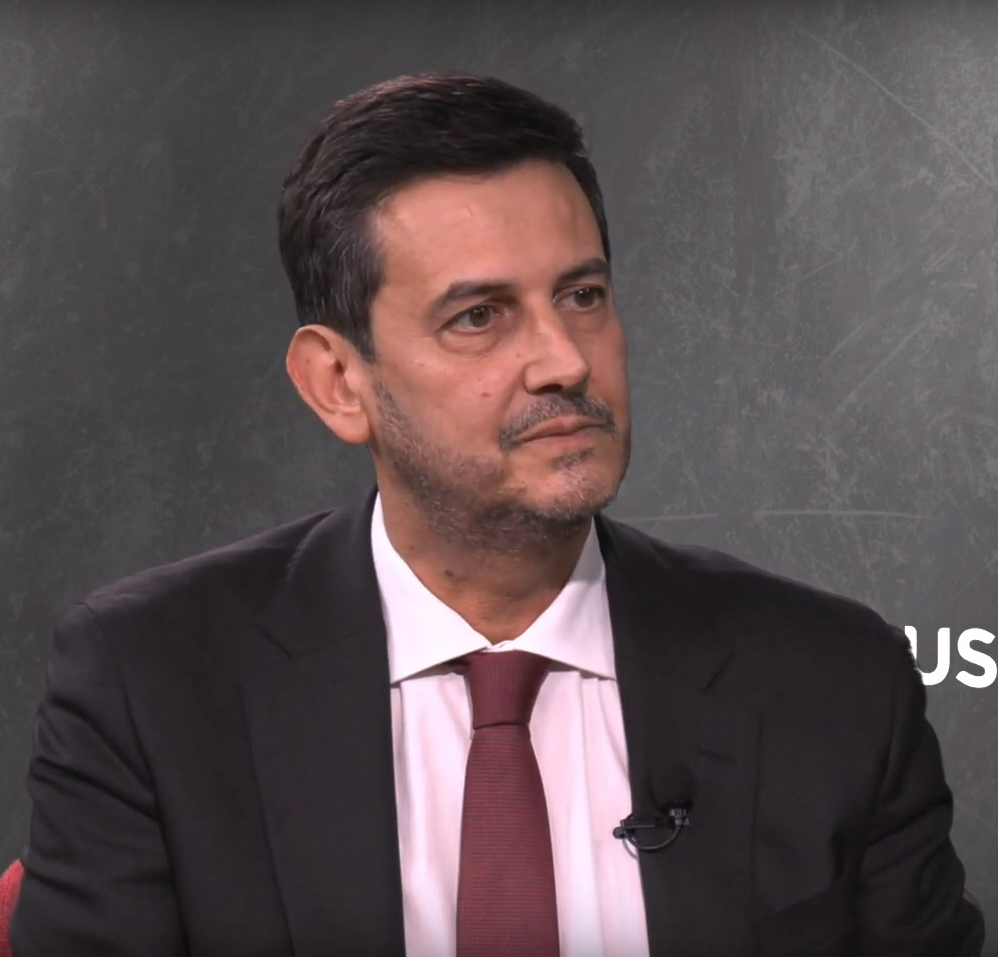

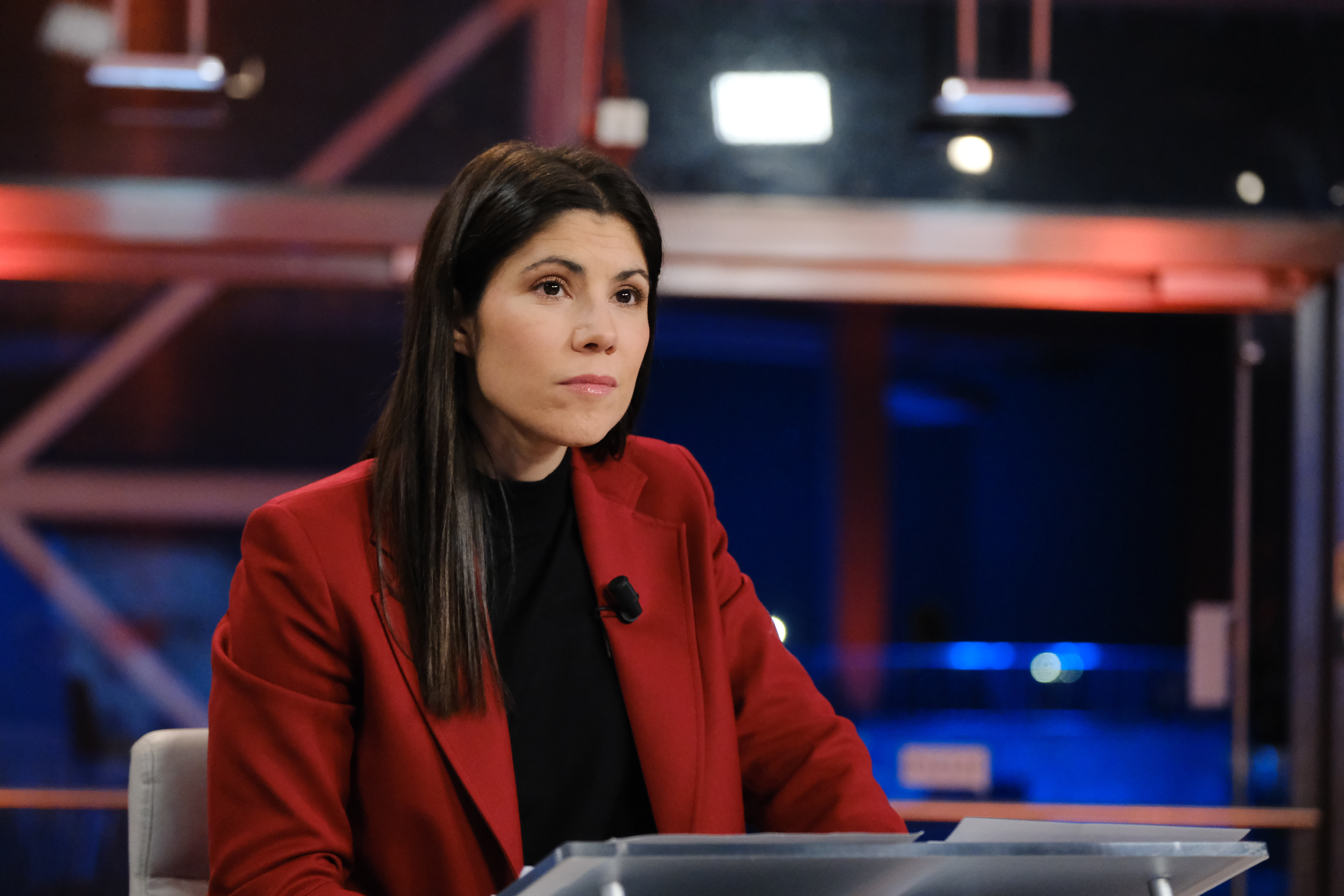

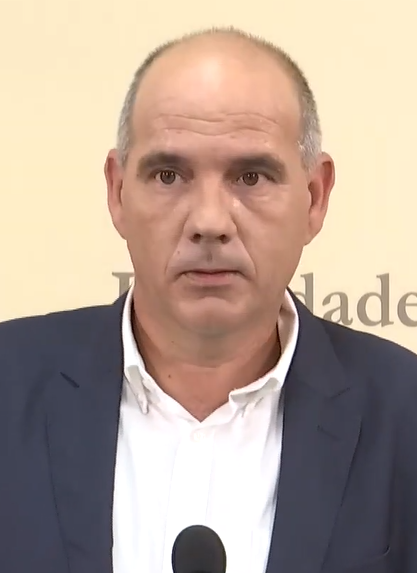

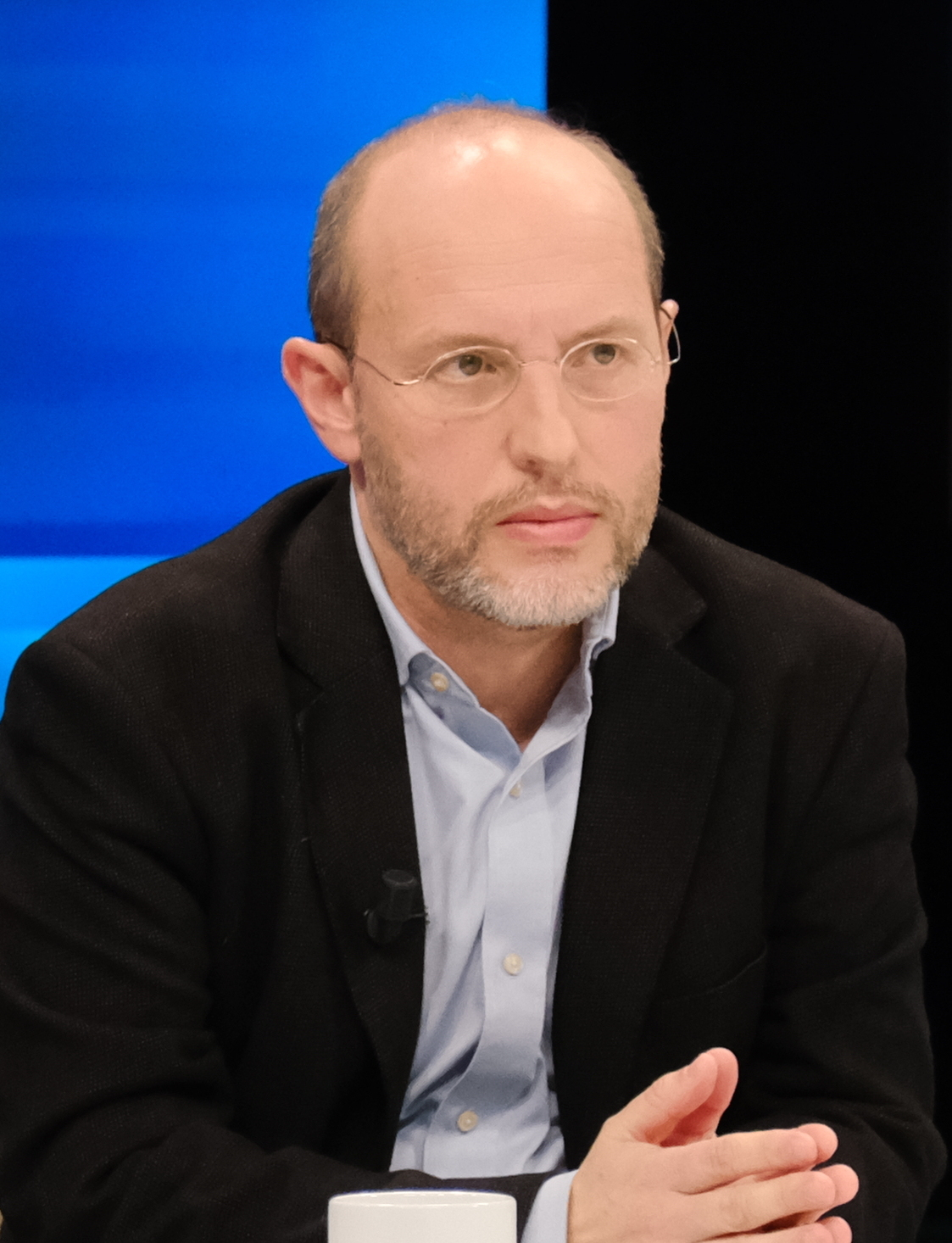

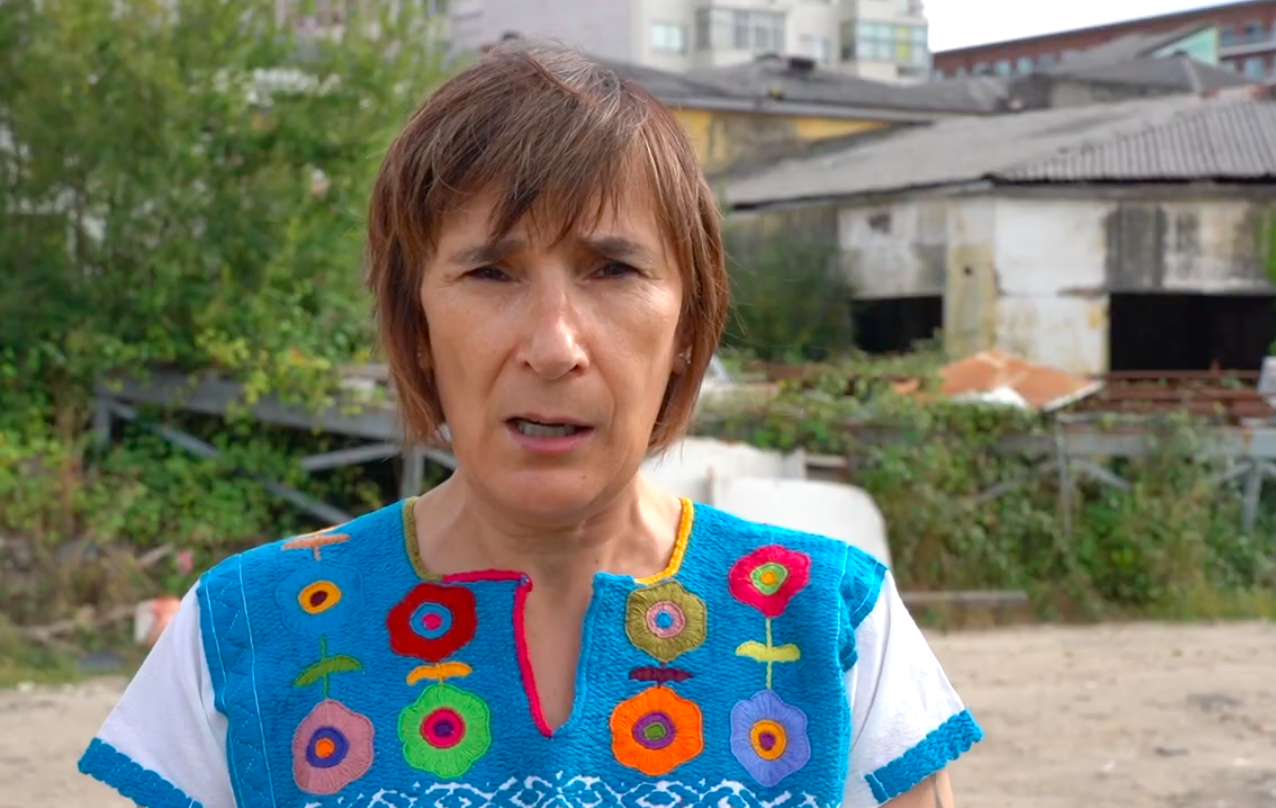

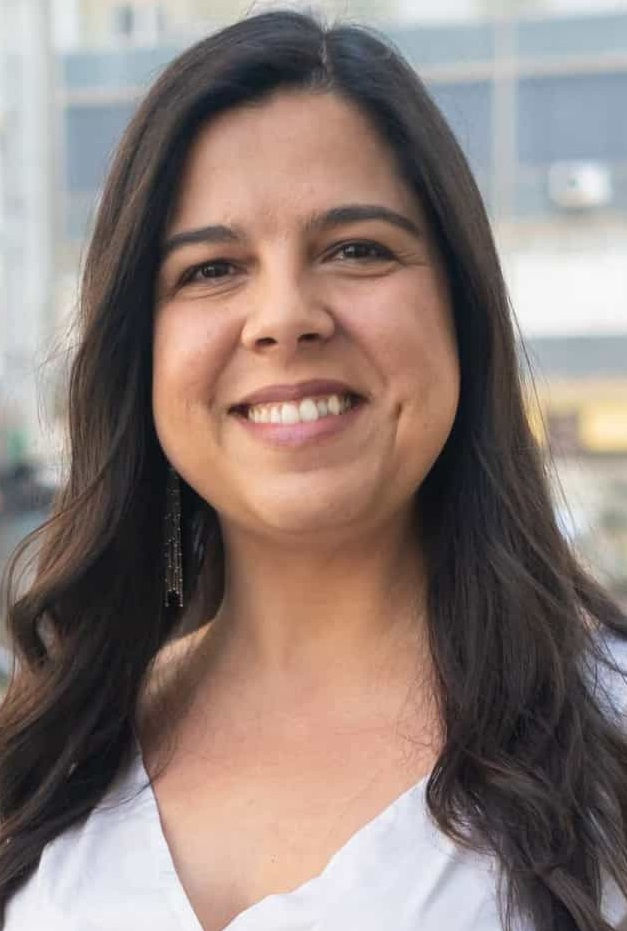
	First party	Second party	Third party
Leader	Luís Montenegro	Pedro Nuno Santos	André Ventura
Party	PSD	PS	CH
Alliance	AD
Leader since	28 May 2022 (Note: As leader of the Social Democratic Party (PSD).)	16 December 2023	9 April 2019
Leader's seat	Lisbon	Aveiro	Lisbon
Last election	77 seats, 30.7% (Note: In the 2022 election, PSD had 77 seats and 29.1% of the votes, CDS-PP had 1.6% and failed to elect any seats and PPM had 0.0% and also failed to elect any seats.)	120 seats, 41.4%	12 seats, 7.2%
Seats won	80	78	50
Seat change	▲3	▼42	▲38
Popular vote	1,867,442 (Note: Sum of the votes of the Democratic Alliance (AD) in mainland Portugal and Azores with the PSD/CDS coalition and PPM list in Madeira. The 3 MPs elected in the PSD/CDS Madeira coalition are all from the PSD.)	1,812,443	1,169,781
Percentage	28.8%	28.0%	18.1%
Swing	▼1.9 pp	▼13.4 pp	▲10.9 pp
	Fourth party	Fifth party	Sixth party
Leader	Rui Rocha	Mariana Mortágua	Paulo Raimundo
Party	IL	BE	PCP
Alliance			CDU
Leader since	22 January 2023	28 May 2023	12 November 2022
Leader's seat	Braga	Lisbon	Lisbon
Last election	8 seats, 4.9%	5 seats, 4.4%	6 seats, 4.3% (Note: The Portuguese Communist Party (PCP) and the Ecologist Party "The Greens" (PEV) contested the 2022 election in a coalition called Unitary Democratic Coalition (CDU) and won a combined 4.3% of the vote and elected 6 MPs to parliament. The 6 MPs elected in 2022 are all from PCP. PEV elected zero.)
Seats won	8	5	4
Seat change	0	0	▼2
Popular vote	319,677	282,314	205,551
Percentage	4.9%	4.4%	3.2%
Swing	0.0 pp	0.0 pp	▼1.1 pp
	Seventh party	Eighth party
Leader	Rui Tavares; Teresa Mota (Note: LIVRE has no formal single leader; the party has a 15-member leadership committee of which Rui Tavares and Teresa Mota serve as spokespersons.)	Inês Sousa Real
Party	LIVRE	PAN
Leader since	6 March 2022	6 June 2021
Leader's seat	Lisbon; Braga (lost)	Lisbon
Last election	1 seat, 1.3%	1 seat, 1.6%
Seats won	4	1
Seat change	▲3	0
Popular vote	204,875	126,125
Percentage	3.2%	2.0%
Swing	▲1.9 pp	▲0.4 pp
Prime Minister before election
António Costa
PS
Prime Minister after election
Luís Montenegro
PSD

A snap legislative election was held on 10 March 2024 to elect members of the Assembly of the Republic to the 16th Legislature of Portugal. All 230 seats to the Assembly of the Republic were up for election. The elections were called in November 2023 after Prime Minister António Costa's resignation following an investigation around alleged corruption involving the award of contracts for lithium and hydrogen businesses.

No party achieved an absolute majority of seats, with the centre-right Democratic Alliance (AD), led by Luís Montenegro, winning 80 seats, closely followed by the Socialist Party (PS), which lost the absolute majority it had gained in the 2022 elections, and was reduced to 78 seats. The election also saw the surge of the right-wing populist Chega party as the third-largest party in parliament, more than quadrupling its previous seat count to 50 seats. Turnout in the election was 59.9 percent, the highest since 2005, and in Portugal alone, turnout rose to 66.2 percent, the highest rate since 1995.

The leader of the largest party, Luís Montenegro, would go on to form a centre-right minority government, ending nearly a decade of rule by the Socialist Party.

== Background ==
Following the state budget rejection by parliament, the Socialist Party (PS), led by Prime Minister António Costa, won an absolute majority in the early 2022 legislative election with 41 percent of the votes and 120 seats in the 230 seat Assembly of the Republic. The main opposition party, the Social Democratic Party (PSD), got 77 seats and 29 percent of the votes, while the populist party Chega (Enough) gained 12 seats and seven percent. The Liberal Initiative (IL) were able to win eight seats and gather almost five percent of the votes. The far-left parties, the Portuguese Communist Party (PCP) and the Left Bloc (BE), achieved one of their worst results ever with four percent of the votes and six and five seats, respectively. PAN and LIVRE were able to win just one seat each.

António Costa's third government was sworn in on 30 March 2022. This government proved to be rather unstable, having experienced numerous scandals and controversies, and despite overseeing a surging economy, it also faced protests amidst the economic impacts and inflation surge provoked by the Russian invasion of Ukraine. By mid-2023, the government had seen the resignations of 11 secretaries of state and two ministers. The biggest scandal involved TAP Air Portugal and a compensation payment to a government member, Alexandra Reis. This case was followed by a violent incident, in late April 2023, at the Ministry of Infrastructure, between government staff members and an advisor to minister João Galamba regarding an alleged stolen laptop. The deployment of the Portuguese Secret Services in this case stirred a clash between President Marcelo Rebelo de Sousa and Prime Minister António Costa concerning the future of Galamba and the government itself.

=== Fall of the previous government ===
On 7 November 2023, the Public Security Police and the Public Prosecutor's office carried out a series of searches at the official residence of the Prime Minister and other ministries, leading to the arrest of the Prime Minister's chief of staff. Costa was named as a suspect in a corruption case involving the awarding of contracts for the lithium and hydrogen businesses, but denied any wrongdoing. He met President Marcelo Rebelo de Sousa in the Presidential Palace and announced his resignation shortly after, stating that he would not run for re-election.

The President heard all parties after Costa's resignation. The Socialist Party proposed a new cabinet led by President of the Assembly of the Republic Augusto Santos Silva, Governor of the Bank of Portugal Mário Centeno or by former minister António Vitorino, that would last until the end of the government's term in 2026, while all opposition parties, except PAN, supported an early election. The President has the power to dissolve the Assembly of the Republic at his discretion; he is not required to do so when a prime minister resigns. President Marcelo Rebelo de Sousa, after meeting with the Council of State, dissolved the assembly and called an early election.

The Prime Minister's resignation was not made official immediately; it was postponed until 8 December 2023, so that the State Budget for 2024 could be approved by parliament. It was the first time a single party majority government did not complete its full term in democratic Portugal.

=== Date ===
According to the Portuguese Constitution, an election must be called between 14 September and 14 October of the year that the legislature ends. The election is called by the President of Portugal but is not called at the request of the Prime Minister; however, the President must listen to all of the parties represented in Parliament and the election date must be announced at least 60 days before the election. If an election is called during an ongoing legislature (dissolution of parliament) it must be held at least after 55 days. Election day is the same in all multi-seat constituencies, and should fall on a Sunday or national holiday. In normal circumstances, the next legislative election would, therefore, have taken place no later than 11 October 2026.

On 9 November 2023, President Marcelo Rebelo de Sousa announced he would dissolve the parliament and called an early election for 10 March 2024. On 15 January 2024, the President signed the decree that officially dissolved Parliament and set the date for the elections. Campaigning officially began on 25 February and lasted for two weeks.

=== Leadership changes and challenges ===
==== LIVRE ====
After the 2022 elections, Rui Tavares was elected as a single deputy from LIVRE, running in the following party's congress, held on 5 and 6 March 2022, in order to become co-spokesperson of the party, running alongside Teresa Mota, who had been a candidate for Braga in the previous election. They faced a leadership challenge from Patrícia Robalo. In the end, Rui Tavares and Teresa Mota were elected with 67% of the votes, against the 31% from Robalo:

Ballot: 6 March 2022
Candidate	Votes	%
Teresa Mota; Rui Tavares	167	66.8
Patrícia Robalo	78	31.2
Abstention	5	2.0
Turnout	250	
Source: Official results

==== CDS – People's Party ====
In the 2022 elections, the CDS – People's Party was wiped out from Parliament for the first time in 47 years of democracy. CDS leader Francisco Rodrigues dos Santos resigned on election night and announced that a leadership ballot would be held and that he would not run again, despite his promise made before the legislative elections. On 11 February, it was announced that a new leader would be elected in a party congress on 2 and 3 April 2022 held in Guimarães. MEP Nuno Melo, former MP Nuno Correia da Silva, 2016 leadership candidate Miguel Mattos Chaves and Bruno Filipe Costa announced they would contest the ballot. During the congress, Bruno Filipe Costa and Nuno Correia da Silva dropped out from the race. Nuno Melo was easily elected as leader with more than 77 percent of the votes. The results were the following:

Ballot: 2 April 2022
Candidate	Votes	%
Nuno Melo	854	77.5
Miguel Mattos Chaves	104	9.4
Others (Note: CDS members that presented party motions but who were not running for the party's leadership.)	144	13.1
Turnout	1,102	
Source: Observador

==== Social Democratic Party ====
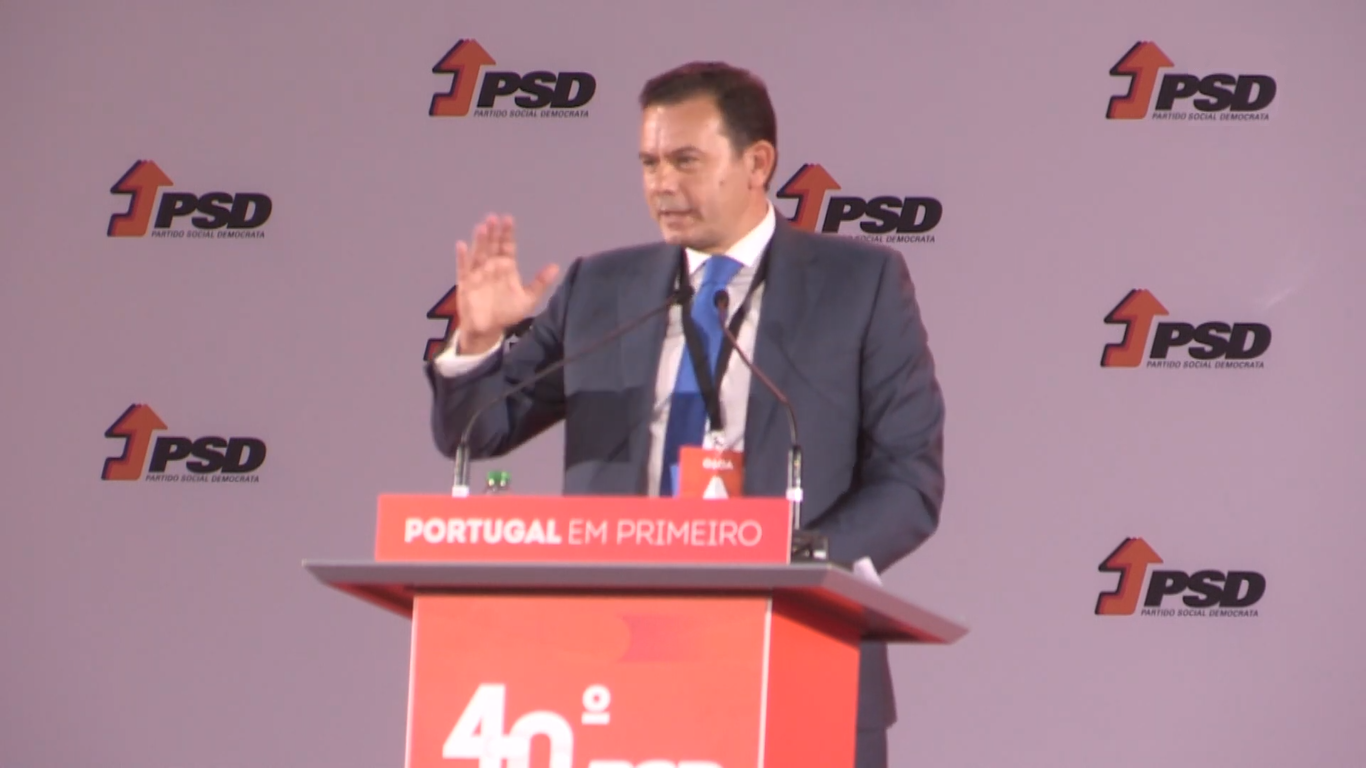
Luís Montenegro addressing the 40th Congress of the PSD in Porto

After the Social Democratic Party's (PSD) defeat in the 2022 legislative election, Rui Rio announced he would call a leadership ballot to elect a new leader, adding that he would not be a candidate again. The ballot was held on 28 May 2022. Luís Montenegro, former PSD parliamentary group leader (2011–2018), and Jorge Moreira da Silva, former Environment minister (2013–2015), were the only candidates on the ballot. Around 45,000 party members, out of more than 85,000 active members, registered to vote. Montenegro defeated Moreira da Silva by a landslide, becoming the 19th leader of the party. The results were as follows:

Ballot: 28 May 2022
Candidate	Votes	%
Luís Montenegro	19,241	72.5
Jorge Moreira da Silva	7,306	27.5
Blank/Invalid ballots	437	–
Turnout	26,984	60.46
Source: Official results

==== Portuguese Communist Party ====
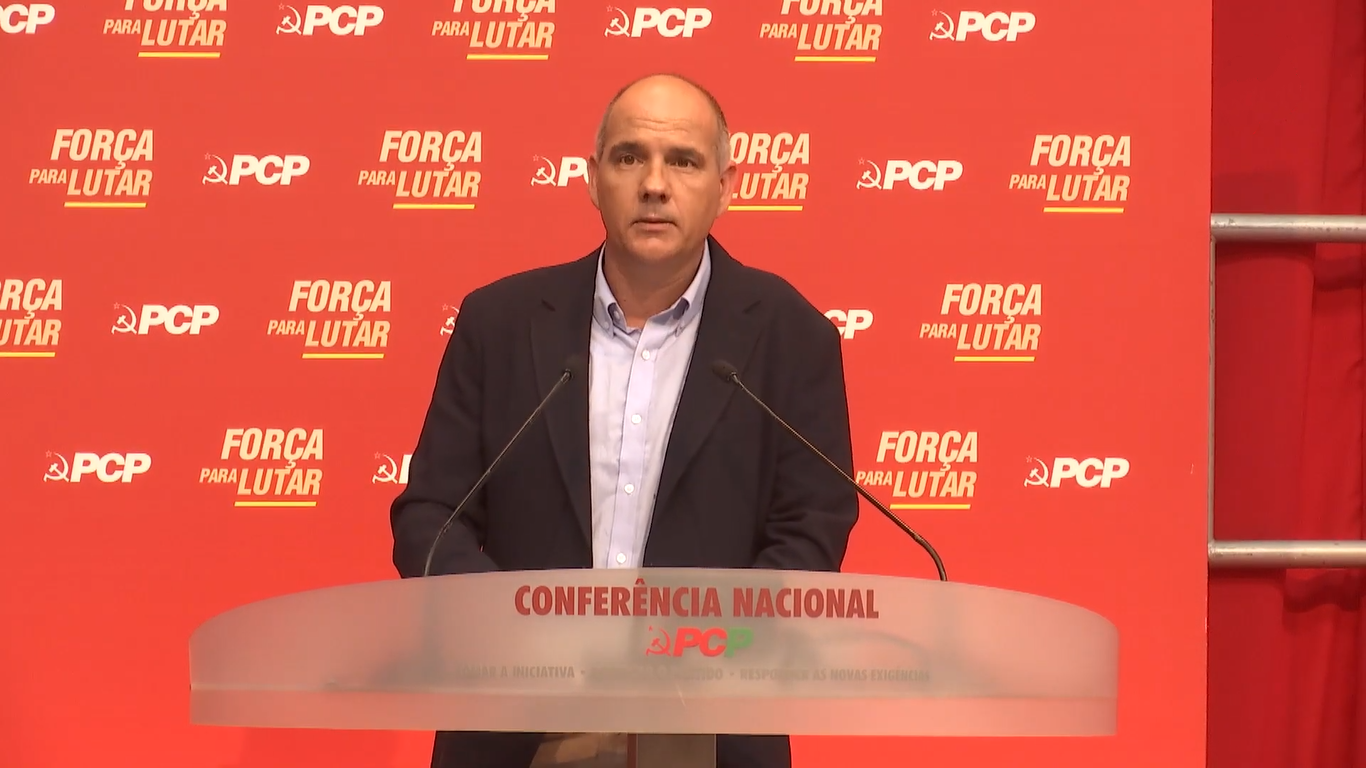
Paulo Raimundo speaking during the Party's Conference that elected him as the Secretary-General of the PCP

On 5 November 2022, the Portuguese Communist Party (PCP) unexpectedly announced that Jerónimo de Sousa, party leader since 2004, was departing from the leadership for health reasons and the demands that the post requires. The party chose Paulo Raimundo, a rather unknown party cadre and member since 1994, as new leader whose nomination was confirmed in a Central Committee meeting on 12 November 2022 by unanimous vote, with one abstention, from Raimundo himself. The results were the following:

Ballot: 12 November 2022
Candidate	Votes	%
Paulo Raimundo	128	99.2
Against	0	0.0
Abstention	1	0.8
Turnout	129	
Source: Observador

==== Liberal Initiative ====
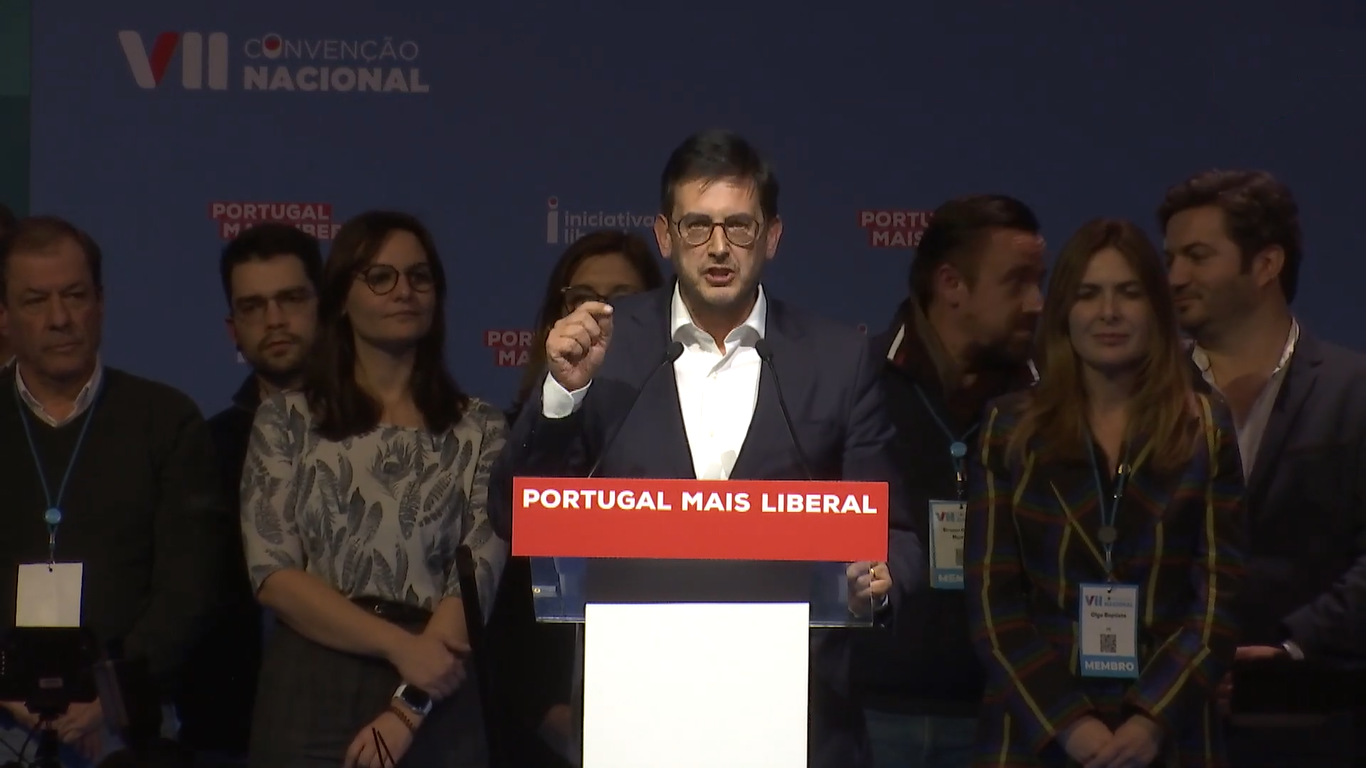
Rui Rocha delivering his victory speech at the Party's Convention on 22 January 2023 in Lisbon

On 23 October 2022, party leader João Cotrim Figueiredo announced he was leaving Liberal Initiative's party leadership and called a snap leadership election. Shortly after Cotrim's announcement, an MP Rui Rocha from Braga constituency, stepped forward and announced his intention to run for the leadership. Two days later, Carla Castro, a Lisbon MP, also presented her candidacy for the leadership. A few weeks later, the party decided on a date and location for the leadership ballot – the new leader would be elected in a National Convention between 21 and 22 January 2023 in Lisbon. A third candidate for the leadership, José Cardoso, a critic of Figueiredo's leadership and strategy, announced his candidacy on 2 January 2023. Around 2,300 party members registered to vote in the leadership convention. Rui Rocha, supported by Cotrim, was elected as the 4th President of the Liberal Initiative with almost 52 percent of the votes. The results were the following:

Ballot: 22 January 2023
Candidate	Votes	%
Rui Rocha	888	51.7
Carla Castro	757	44.0
José Cardoso	74	4.3
Blank/Invalid ballots	9	–
Turnout	1,728	74.26
Source: Diário de Notícias

==== People Animals Nature ====
People Animals Nature (Pessoas-Animais-Natureza – PAN) held a leadership ballot on 20 May 2023. Two candidates were on the ballot: Incumbent leader Inês Sousa Real and Nelson Silva, MP between 2019 and 2022. Silva accused Sousa Real of leading the party to irrelevance and said that now it's time to "save" and "rebuild" the party. In a rather tense congress, with strong accusations between both sides, Inês Sousa Real was re-elected party leader with 73 percent of the votes. The results were the following:

Ballot: 20 May 2023
Candidate	Votes	%
Inês Sousa Real	97	72.9
Nelson Silva	35	26.3
Blank/Invalid ballots	1	0.8
Turnout	133	
Source: Expresso

==== Left Bloc ====
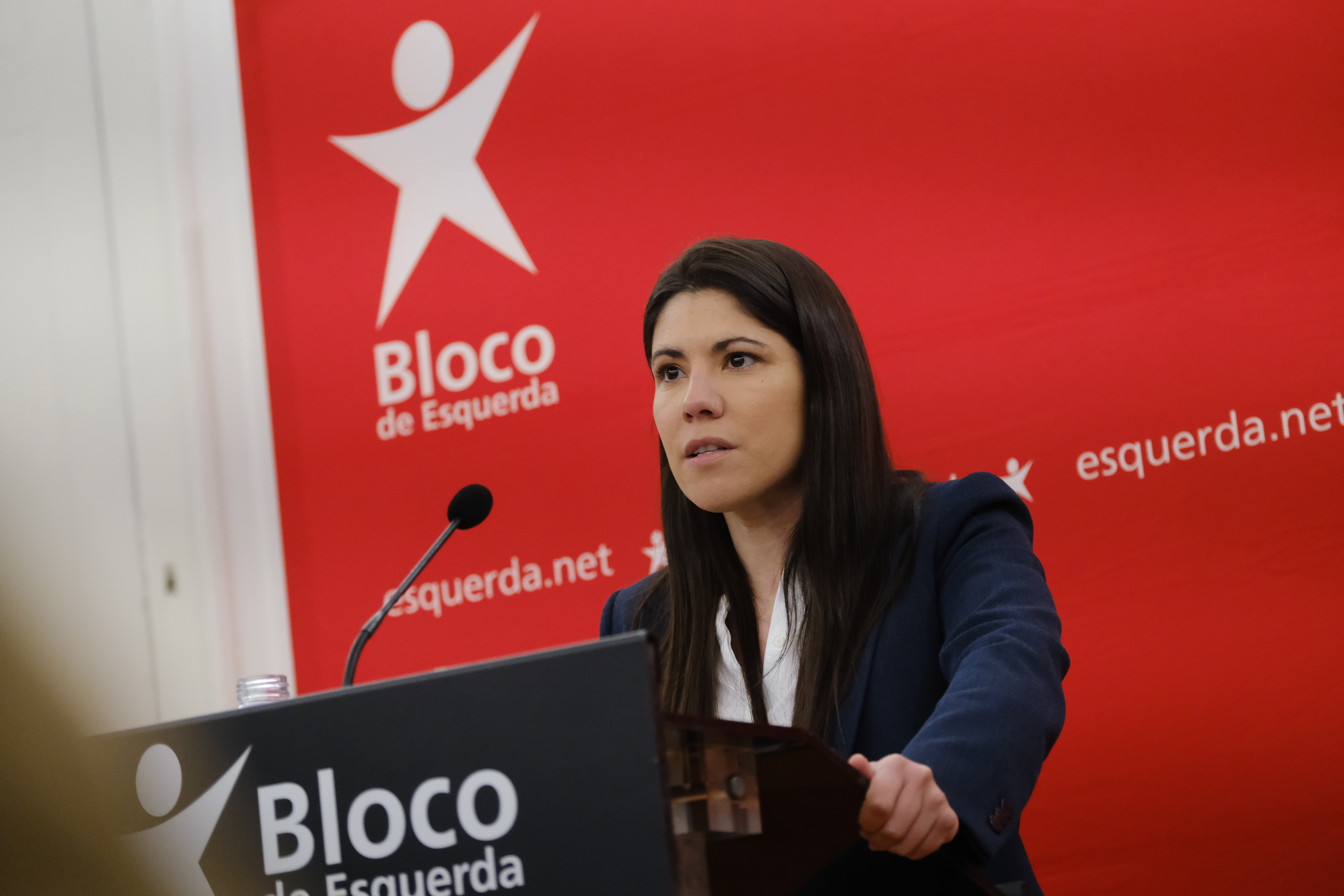
Mariana Mortágua announcing her candidacy on 27 February 2023 in Lisbon

On 14 February 2023 party coordinator Catarina Martins announced that she would not run for another term as party leader. Her reasons were that in the party very long periods of leadership are not desirable and that the "new political cycle" demanded a change. A party leadership convention was held between 27 and 28 May 2023, in Lisbon.

After MEP Marisa Matias and caucus leader Pedro Filipe Soares declined to run, MP Mariana Mortágua decided to run for the party leadership. Her candidacy was confirmed on 27 February 2023. A list of critics of the then party leadership, led by former MP Pedro Soares, opposed Mortágua in the convention ballot. On 28 May 2023, Mariana Mortágua was easily elected as new party coordinator with 83 percent of the delegates' votes. The results were the following:

Ballot: 28 May 2023
Candidate	Votes	%
Mariana Mortágua	439	83.1
Pedro Soares	78	14.8
Abstentions	11	2.1
Turnout	528	80.74
Source: CNN Portugal

==== Socialist Party ====
After the resignation of António Costa as Prime Minister on 7 November 2023, following the Operation Influencer corruption investigation, and his announcement that he would not run again for office, the Socialist Party (PS) held a leadership election to elect a new leader on 15 and 16 December 2023. On 9 November 2023, former Minister of Infrastructure and Housing Pedro Nuno Santos announced his candidacy for the party leadership, while Minister of Internal Administration José Luís Carneiro announced his intention to run on the following day. On 18 November 2023, Daniel Adrião, a member of the National Commission of PS and candidate in the PS leadership elections of 2016, 2018 and 2021, announced his candidacy. On 16 December, Pedro Nuno Santos was easily elected with almost 61 percent of the votes, compared with 37 percent for José Luís Carneiro. The results were the following:

Ballot: 15 and 16 December 2023
Candidate	Votes	%
Pedro Nuno Santos	24,219	60.8
José Luís Carneiro	14,891	37.4
Daniel Adrião	382	1.0
Blank/Invalid ballots	322	0.8
Turnout	39,814	68.65
Source: Official results

=== Electoral system ===
Ballot paper for the 2024 legislative elections in Aveiro.

The Assembly of the Republic has 230 members elected for four-year terms. Governments do not require an absolute majority support of the Assembly to hold office, as even if the number of opposition MPs is larger than that of its supporters, the opposition still needs to be equal to or greater than 116 (absolute majority) for both the Government's Programme to be rejected or for a motion of no confidence to be approved.

The number of seats assigned to each constituency depends on the district magnitude. The use of the d'Hondt method makes for a higher effective threshold than certain other allocation methods such as the Hare quota or Sainte-Laguë method, which are more generous to small parties.

The distribution of MPs by constituency for the 2024 legislative election is the following:

Constituency	Number of MPs	Map
Lisbon	48	
Porto	40	
Braga and Setúbal^{(+1)}	19	
Aveiro	16	
Leiria	10	
Coimbra, Faro and Santarém	9	
Viseu	8	
Madeira	6	
Azores, Viana do Castelo^{(−1)} and Vila Real	5	
Castelo Branco	4	
Beja, Bragança, Évora and Guarda	3	
Portalegre, Europe and Outside Europe	2	

=== Early voting ===
Voters were also able to vote early, which happened on 3 March, one week before election day. Voters had to register between 25 and 29 February 2024 in order to be eligible to cast an early ballot. By the 29 February deadline, 208,007 voters had requested to vote early, a number well below the 2022 figures. On 3 March, 180,835 voters (86.9 percent of voters that requested) cast an early ballot.

== Parties ==
Parties and/or coalitions that intended to run had until 29 January 2024 to file lists of candidates. Eighteen parties and/or coalitions filed lists to contest the election. The Social Democratic Party (PSD), CDS – People's Party (CDS–PP) and the People's Monarchist Party (PPM) contested the election in a coalition called Democratic Alliance (AD). This coalition was on the ballot in mainland Portugal and the Azores. In Madeira, the coalition was only between PSD and CDS–PP, called Madeira First. PPM ran alone in Madeira. The Communist Party (PCP) renewed their coalition with the Greens (PEV), Unitary Democratic Coalition (CDU), as has been the case since 1987. The Earth Party (MPT) and Alliance (A) also contested the election under a coalition called Alternative 21 (A21).

=== Parliamentary factions ===
The table below lists the parties and/or coalitions represented in the Assembly of the Republic during the 15th legislature (2022–2024) and that also contested the 2024 elections:

Name			Ideology	Political position	Leader	2022 result		Seats at dissolution	Ref.
Name			Ideology	Political position	Leader	%	Seats	Seats at dissolution	Ref.
PS	Socialist Party; Partido Socialista		Social democracy Progressivism	Centre-left	Pedro Nuno Santos	41.4%	120 / 230	120 / 230	
AD	PPD/PSD	Social Democratic Party; Partido Social Democrata	Liberal conservatism	Centre-right	Luís Montenegro	29.1%	77 / 230	76 / 230	(Note: The 77 MPs elected in 2022 are all from the Social Democratic Party (PPD/PSD). CDS–PP and PPM elected zero.)
AD	CDS–PP	CDS – People's Party; CDS – Partido Popular	Christian democracy Conservatism	Centre-right to right-wing	Nuno Melo	1.6%	0 / 230	0 / 230	(Note: The 77 MPs elected in 2022 are all from the Social Democratic Party (PPD/PSD). CDS–PP and PPM elected zero.)
AD	PPM	People's Monarchist Party; Partido Popular Monárquico	Monarchism; Conservatism	Right-wing	Gonçalo da Câmara Pereira	0.0%	0 / 230	0 / 230	(Note: The 77 MPs elected in 2022 are all from the Social Democratic Party (PPD/PSD). CDS–PP and PPM elected zero.)
CH	Enough! Chega!		National conservatism Right-wing populism	Right-wing to far-right	André Ventura	7.2%	12 / 230	12 / 230	
IL	Liberal Initiative; Iniciativa Liberal		Classical liberalism Right-libertarianism	Centre-right to right-wing	Rui Rocha	4.9%	8 / 230	8 / 230	
CDU	PCP	Portuguese Communist Party; Partido Comunista Português	Communism; Marxism–Leninism	Left-wing to far-left	Paulo Raimundo	4.3%	6 / 230	6 / 230	
BE	Left Bloc; Bloco de Esquerda		Democratic socialism Left-wing populism	Left-wing to far-left	Mariana Mortágua	4.4%	5 / 230	5 / 230	
PAN	People Animals Nature; Pessoas-Animais-Natureza		Animal welfare Environmentalism	Centre-left (Note: Some sources state that People Animals Nature (PAN) is neither on the left nor the right.)	Inês Sousa Real	1.6%	1 / 230	1 / 230	
L	FREE; LIVRE		Green politics Pro-Europeanism	Centre-left to left-wing	Rui Tavares and Teresa Mota	1.3%	1 / 230	1 / 230	
Ind.	Independent; Independente		António Maló de Abreu (left the Social Democratic Party caucus)					1 / 230	

==== Seat changes ====
- On 10 January 2024, Social Democratic MP António Maló de Abreu announced he was leaving his party, citing deep disagreements with the leadership and that the party elections prospects were bad. He remained in Parliament as an Independent.
- On 22 January 2024, Social Democratic MP Rui Cristina announced he was also leaving his party, after the party's leadership put him in an unelectable spot on the lists. Rui Cristina was then selected as a Chega candidate for the March election. He remained MP as an Independent, but because his resignation came after the dissolution of Parliament, he never sat as an Independent.

=== Non-represented parties ===
The table below lists the parties and/or coalitions not represented in the Assembly of the Republic and that also ran in the elections.

Name		Ideology	Political position	Leader	2022 result	Ref.
Name		Ideology	Political position	Leader	%	Ref.
RIR	React, Include, Recycle; Reagir, Incluir, Reciclar,	Humanism; Pacifism	Syncretic	Márcia Henriques	0.4%	
PCTP/MRPP	Portuguese Workers' Communist Party; Partido Comunista dos Trabalhadores Portugueses	Marxism-Leninism; Maoism	Far-left	Cidália Guerreiro	0.2%	
ADN	National Democratic Alternative; Alternativa Democrática Nacional	Traditionalism; Anti-establishment	Right-wing	Bruno Fialho	0.2%	
JPP	Together for the People; Juntos pelo Povo	Regionalism; Social liberalism	Centre	Élvio Sousa	0.2%	
A21	Alternative 21 Alternativa 21: Earth Party (MPT); Alliance (A)	Green conservatism Conservative liberalism	Centre-right	Pedro Pimenta & Jorge Nuno de Sá	0.1% 0.0%	
VP	Volt Portugal; Volt Portugal	Social liberalism European federalism	Centre to Centre-left	Ana Carvalho & Duarte Costa	0.1%	
E	Rise Up; Ergue-te	National conservatism Anti-immigration	Far-right	José Pinto Coelho	0.1%	
NC	We, the Citizens! Nós, Cidadãos!	Social liberalism Pro-Europeanism	Centre-right	Joaquim Rocha Afonso	0.1%	
PTP	Portuguese Labour Party; Partido Trabalhista Português	Democratic socialism Social democracy	Centre-left to Left-wing	Amândio Madaleno	0.1%	
ND	New Right; Nova Direita	National conservatism Economic liberalism	Right-wing	Ossanda Liber	—N/a	

=== Rejected ===
Name		Ideology	Political position	Leader	2022 result	Ref.
Name		Ideology	Political position	Leader	%	Ref.
MAS	Socialist Alternative Movement; Movimento Alternativa Socialista	Socialism; Trotskyism	Left-wing	Renata Cambra	0.1%	

== Campaign ==
=== Issues ===
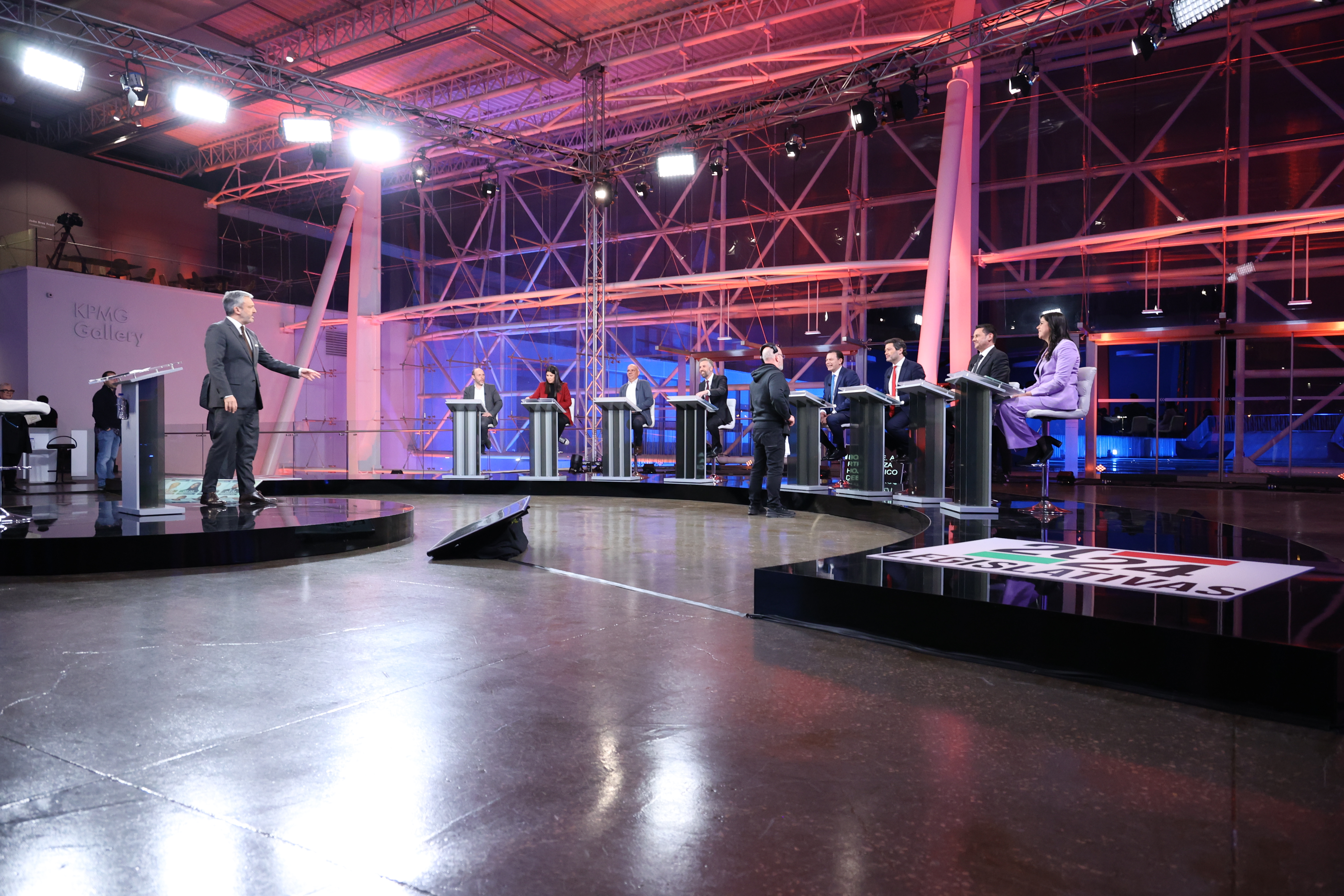
Debate with parties seated in Parliament on 23 February 2024, broadcast by RTP1.

The issue of government formation after the elections was central during the campaign, with the two major parties arguing over whether they would enable the victor to form a minority government. The Socialist Party (PS) leader Pedro Nuno Santos changed positions regarding the scenario of a Democratic Alliance (AD) minority, with first being against it but, as the official campaign started, expressed his openness to letting the AD govern. AD leader Luís Montenegro, initially against the idea of letting the PS govern, also changed his tone but speculation remained regarding his position. Healthcare and education were also crucial issues for voters, according to surveys.

In an interview with Expresso on 8 March, President Marcelo Rebelo de Sousa said that he would do everything in his ability to prevent Chega from gaining power, which drew criticism due to his position's mandate of neutrality. In a televised address on 9 March, Rebelo de Sousa called for people to vote, citing the risk of economic problems caused by elections in the European Parliament and the United States later in the year, and the ongoing conflicts in Ukraine and the Middle East.

Although economic indicators had been improving since 2014 – growth of 2.3 percent in 2023, well above the European average (0.5 percent), an unemployment rate of 6.5 percent and public debt falling below 100 percent of gross domestic product – discontent prevailed in Portugal, particularly due to the lack of response to social issues. The country faced a housing crisis and soaring rent prices, a deteriorating public health and education system, shortages of teachers and doctors, very low wages and high inflation.

=== Party slogans of represented parties ===
Party or alliance	Original slogan	English translation	Refs
PS	« Mais Ação » « Portugal Inteiro »	"More Action" "Whole Portugal"	
AD	« Acreditar na Mudança » « A mudança está nas tuas mãos »	"Believe in Change" "Change is in your hands"	
CH	« Limpar Portugal »	"Clean up Portugal"	
IL	« Portugal com Futuro »	"Portugal with Future"	
CDU	« Mais CDU, vida melhor »	"More CDU, better life"	
BE	« Fazer o que nunca foi feito »	"Do what has never been done"	
PAN	« Avançamos pelas Causas »	"We advance for Causes"	
L	« Contrato com o Futuro »	"Contract with the Future"	

=== Candidates' debates ===
==== With parties represented in Parliament ====
2024 Portuguese legislative election debates
Date	Time	Organisers	Moderator(s)	P Present (Note: Denotes a main invitee attending the event.) S Surrogate (Note: Denotes a main invitee not attending the event, sending a surrogate in their place.) NI Not invited I Invited A Absent invitee								
Date	Time	Organisers	Moderator(s)	PS	AD	CH	IL	CDU	BE	PAN	L	Ref.
5 Feb	9PM	SIC	Clara de Sousa	P Santos	NI	NI	P Rocha	NI	NI	NI	NI	
5 Feb	10PM	RTP3	João Adelino; Faria	NI	NI	P Ventura	NI	NI	NI	P Real	NI	
6 Feb	6PM	RTP3	João Adelino; Faria	NI	NI	NI	NI	P Raimundo	NI	P Real	NI	
6 Feb	9PM	TVI	Sara Pinto	NI	P Montenegro	NI	NI	NI	P Mortágua	NI	NI	
6 Feb	10PM	SIC Notícias	Rosa de Oliveira; Pinto	NI	NI	P Ventura	P Rocha	NI	NI	NI	NI	
7 Feb	6PM	CNN Portugal	João Póvoa; Marinheiro	NI	NI	NI	P Rocha	NI	NI	NI	P Tavares	
8 Feb	6PM	SIC Notícias	Rosa de Oliveira; Pinto	NI	NI	NI	NI	NI	P Mortágua	NI	P Tavares	
9 Feb	6PM	SIC Notícias	Rosa de Oliveira; Pinto	NI	NI	NI	P Rocha	NI	NI	P Real	NI	
9 Feb	9PM	RTP1	João Adelino; Faria	P Santos	NI	NI	NI	NI	NI	NI	P Tavares	
9 Feb	10PM	CNN Portugal	João Póvoa; Marinheiro	NI	NI	P Ventura	NI	P Raimundo	NI	NI	NI	
10 Feb	9PM	RTP1	João Adelino; Faria	NI	P Montenegro	NI	NI	P Raimundo	NI	NI	NI	
10 Feb	9PM	TVI	Sara Pinto	P Santos	NI	NI	NI	NI	NI	P Real	NI	
11 Feb	9PM	SIC	Clara de Sousa	NI	P Montenegro	NI	NI	NI	NI	P Real	NI	
11 Feb	10PM	SIC Notícias	Rosa de Oliveira; Pinto	NI	NI	NI	NI	P Raimundo	P Mortágua	NI	NI	
12 Feb	9PM	RTP1	João Adelino; Faria	NI	P Montenegro	P Ventura	NI	NI	NI	NI	NI	
13 Feb	6PM	CNN Portugal	João Póvoa; Marinheiro	NI	NI	NI	NI	P Raimundo	NI	NI	P Tavares	
13 Feb	10PM	RTP3	João Adelino; Faria	NI	NI	P Ventura	NI	NI	P Mortágua	NI	NI	
14 Feb	6PM	RTP3	João Adelino; Faria	NI	NI	NI	NI	NI	NI	P Real	P Tavares	
14 Feb	9PM	TVI	Sara Pinto	P Santos	NI	P Ventura	NI	NI	NI	NI	NI	
14 Feb	10PM	RTP3	João Adelino; Faria	NI	NI	NI	P Rocha	P Raimundo	NI	NI	NI	
15 Feb	6PM	CNN Portugal	João Póvoa; Marinheiro	NI	NI	NI	P Rocha	NI	P Mortágua	NI	NI	
16 Feb	9PM	RTP1	João Adelino; Faria	P Santos	NI	NI	NI	NI	P Mortágua	NI	NI	
16 Feb	10PM	SIC Notícias	Rosa de Oliveira; Pinto	NI	NI	P Ventura	NI	NI	NI	NI	P Tavares	
17 Feb	8:30PM	SIC	Clara de Sousa	P Santos	NI	NI	NI	P Raimundo	NI	NI	NI	
17 Feb	9PM	TVI	Sara Pinto	NI	P Montenegro	NI	NI	NI	NI	NI	P Tavares	
18 Feb	8:45PM	SIC	Clara de Sousa	NI	P Montenegro	NI	P Rocha	NI	NI	NI	NI	
18 Feb	10PM	CNN Portugal	João Póvoa; Marinheiro	NI	NI	NI	NI	NI	P Mortágua	P Real	NI	
19 Feb	8:30PM	RTP1; SIC; TVI	João Adelino; Faria; Clara de Sousa; Sara Pinto	P Santos	P Montenegro	NI	NI	NI	NI	NI	NI	
23 Feb	9PM	RTP1	Carlos Daniel	P Santos	P Montenegro	P Ventura	P Rocha	P Raimundo	P Mortágua	P Real	P Tavares	
26 Feb	10AM	Antena 1 TSF; Renascença; Observador	Natália Carvalho; Judith Menezes e Sousa; Susana Madureira; Martins; Rui Pedro Antunes	P Santos	P Montenegro	A	P Rocha	P Raimundo	P Mortágua	P Real	P Tavares	
Candidate viewed as "most convincing" in each debate or debates
Date	Time	Organisers	Polling firm									
Date	Time	Organisers	Polling firm	PS	AD	CH	IL	CDU	BE	PAN	L	Ref.
Debates between 5 and 13 Feb			Aximage	17%	19%	20%	10%	2%	9%	4%	7%	12% Und
19 Feb	8:30PM	RTP1, SIC, TVI	CESOP–UCP	26%	22%	—N/a	—N/a	—N/a	—N/a	—N/a	—N/a	53% Oth (Note: 33% Didn't see the debate; 10% Tie; 4% None; 6% Undecided.)
19 Feb	8:30PM	RTP1, SIC, TVI	Aximage	46%	38%	—N/a	—N/a	—N/a	—N/a	—N/a	—N/a	16% Und

==== With parties not represented in Parliament ====
2024 Portuguese legislative election debates
Date	Time	Organisers	Moderator(s)	P Present (Note: Denotes a main invitee attending the event.) S Surrogate (Note: Denotes a main invitee not attending the event, sending a surrogate in their place.) NI Not invited I Invited A Absent invitee										
Date	Time	Organisers	Moderator(s)	RIR	PCTP	ADN	JPP	A21	VP	E	NC	PTP	ND	Ref.
20 Feb	9PM	RTP1	Carlos Daniel	P Henriques	P Pinto	P Fialho	P Sousa	P Afonso	P Figueiredo	P P. Coelho	P R. Afonso	P Coelho	P Liber	

== Opinion polling ==
Local Regression of polls conducted since the election

=== Polling aggregations ===
Polling aggregator	Last update	PS	Democratic Alliance (Portugal, 2024)		CH	IL	BE	CDU	PAN	L	Lead
2024 legislative election	10 March 2024	28.0; 78	28.8; 80		18.1; 50	4.9; 8	4.4; 5	3.2; 4	2.0; 1	3.2; 4	0.8
Europe Elects	7 March 2024	28	34		17	6	6	3	1	4	6
PolitPro	7 March 2024	28.2	32.1		16.6	6.1	5.4	3.3	1.8	3.5	3.9
Marktest	6 March 2024	27.0	33.9		16.4	5.8	5.5	3.3	1.5	3.8	6.9
Politico	6 March 2024	28	33		16	6	5	4	1	4	5
Renascença	6 March 2024	27.8	32.3		16.9	5.5	4.6	2.7	1.3	3.7	4.5
2022 legislative election	30 January 2022	41.4; 120	29.1; 77	1.6; 0	7.2; 12	4.9; 8	4.4; 5	4.3; 6	1.6; 1	1.3; 1	12.3

== Voter turnout ==
The table below shows voter turnout throughout election day including voters from Overseas.

Turnout	Time								
Turnout	12:00			16:00			19:00		
Turnout	2022	2024	±	2022	2024	±	2022	2024	±
Total	23.27%	25.21%	▲1.94 pp	45.66%	51.96%	▲6.30 pp	51.46%	59.90%	▲8.44 pp

Turnout was higher in this election, with a record 6.5 million voters casting a ballot, thus surpassing the 1980 record. In Portugal alone, turnout stood at 66.2 percent, an increase of more than eight percent compared with 2022, and the best turnout share since 1995.

== Results ==
The final results of the election were released late on 20 March, when the counting of overseas ballots that constitute four seats was concluded.

In the closest legislative election in Portuguese history, the Democratic Alliance narrowly won, gathering 28.8 percent of the votes and winning 80 seats. The Alliance won all districts in the North Region and recovered their support in strongholds such as the districts of Leiria and Viseu. During election day, the Democratic Alliance issued a warning that many voters were casting ballots for the National Democratic Alternative (ADN) due to confusion surrounding the similar name and abbreviation on ballot papers. ADN won more than 100,000 votes, with many considering that this confusion between the names may have "stolen" seats from the Democratic Alliance. The Socialist Party (PS) won 28 percent of the votes and 78 seats. Despite the narrow margin between the Alliance and the Socialists, the PS fell 13 points and lost more than 40 seats compared with the 2022 election.

Chega made large gains, winning 18 percent of the vote and receiving nearly 1.2 million votes. The party also won 50 seats and received the most votes in Faro district, the first time since the 1991 legislative election that a third party won a district. The Liberal Initiative (IL) held on to their eight seats and their vote share from 2022, earning 4.9 percent of the vote; however, the results were below the party's expectations. The Left Bloc (BE) also performed below expectations by retaining their five seats from 2022 and winning exactly the same vote share in 2022 at 4.4 percent.

The Unitary Democratic Coalition (CDU), composed by the Portuguese Communist Party and the Ecologist Party "The Greens", lost seats. The CDU won four seats, a decrease of two compared with 2022, and just 3.2 percent of the votes, their worst nationwide electoral performance to date. The coalition further lost their historic seat in Beja district; for the first time under democratic rule, it also lost all MPs in the Alentejo region. LIVRE received almost the same number of votes as the CDU, winning 3.2 percent of the votes, and electing four seats from Lisbon, Porto and Setúbal districts. People Animals Nature (PAN) held its sole seat, held by leader Inês Sousa Real, and won 2 percent of the votes.

=== National summary ===
Party or alliance		Votes	%	+/–	Seats	+/–
Democratic Alliance (Note: Democratic Alliance results are compared to the combined totals of the Social Democratic Party, the Democratic and Social Centre and the People's Monarchist Party in the 2022 election.)	Democratic Alliance (Note: PSD/CDS–PP/PPM list in mainland Portugal, Azores and Overseas.)	1,814,002	28.01	–1.77	77	+3
Democratic Alliance	Madeira First (Note: In Madeira, the PSD and the CDS–PP contested the elections in a coalition called Madeira First (Madeira Primeiro).)	52,989	0.82	–0.09	3	0
Democratic Alliance	People's Monarchist Party (Note: PPM list only in Madeira)	451	0.01	+0.01	0	0
Democratic Alliance	Total	1,867,442	28.83	–1.86	80	+3
Socialist Party		1,812,443	27.98	–13.40	78	–42
Chega		1,169,781	18.06	+10.88	50	+38
Liberal Initiative		319,877	4.94	+0.02	8	0
Left Bloc		282,314	4.36	–0.04	5	0
Unitary Democratic Coalition		205,551	3.17	–1.12	4	–2
LIVRE		204,875	3.16	+1.88	4	+3
People Animals Nature		126,125	1.95	+0.37	1	0
National Democratic Alternative		102,134	1.58	+1.38	0	0
React, Include, Recycle		26,092	0.40	–0.02	0	0
Together for the People		19,145	0.30	+0.19	0	0
Nova Direita		16,456	0.25	New	0	New
Portuguese Workers' Communist Party		15,491	0.24	+0.04	0	0
Volt Portugal		11,854	0.18	+0.07	0	0
Ergue-te		6,030	0.09	+0.00	0	0
Alternative 21 (Earth Party/Alliance)		4,265	0.07	–0.09	0	0
Portuguese Labour Party		2,435	0.04	–0.02	0	0
We, the Citizens!		2,399	0.04	–0.03	0	0
Socialist Alternative Movement (Note: List rejected. Votes counted as invalid.)		0	0.00	–0.11	0	0
Total		6,194,709	100.00	–	230	0
Valid votes		6,194,709	95.64	–1.72		
Invalid votes		192,396	2.97	+1.47		
Blank votes		89,847	1.39	+0.26		
Total votes		6,476,952	100.00	–		
Registered voters/turnout		10,813,643	59.90	+8.44		
Source: Comissão Nacional de Eleições

Vote share
AD	28.01%
PS	27.98%
CH	18.06%
IL	4.94%
BE	4.36%
CDU	3.17%
L	3.16%
PAN	1.95%
ADN	1.58%
MF	0.82%
Others	1.62%
Blank/Invalid	4.36%

Parliamentary seats
PS	33.91%
AD	33.48%
CH	21.74%
IL	3.48%
BE	2.17%
CDU	1.74%
L	1.74%
MF	1.30%
PAN	0.43%

=== Distribution by constituency ===
Results of the 2024 election of the Portuguese Assembly of the Republic by constituency
Constituency	%	S	%	S	%	S	%	S	%	S	%	S	%	S	%	S	%	S	Total S
Constituency	PS		AD		CH		IL		BE		CDU		L		MF		PAN		Total S
Azores	29.2	2	39.8	2	15.8	1	2.7	–	3.4	–	1.1	–	1.7	–			1.6	–	5
Aveiro	27.7	5	35.1	7	17.3	3	5.1	1	4.1	–	1.4	–	2.2	–			1.7	–	16
Beja	31.7	1	16.7	1	21.6	1	2.2	–	4.4	–	15.0	–	1.8	–			1.2	–	3
Braga	28.2	6	33.2	8	16.9	4	6.1	1	3.8	–	1.8	–	2.3	–			1.4	–	19
Bragança	29.6	1	40.0	2	18.2	–	1.7	–	1.9	–	1.1	–	1.0	–			0.8	–	3
Castelo Branco	34.2	2	28.5	1	19.5	1	2.7	–	4.1	–	2.2	–	2.0	–			1.3	–	4
Coimbra	32.7	4	30.6	3	15.5	2	4.0	–	5.1	–	2.8	–	2.8	–			1.6	–	9
Évora	32.8	1	22.4	1	20.0	1	2.6	–	4.3	–	10.9	–	2.0	–			1.1	–	3
Faro	25.5	3	22.4	3	27.2	3	4.6	–	5.8	–	3.2	–	2.8	–			2.6	–	9
Guarda	31.9	1	34.1	1	18.6	1	2.3	–	2.7	–	1.6	–	1.4	–			1.0	–	3
Leiria	22.5	3	35.2	5	19.7	2	5.7	–	4.3	–	2.4	–	2.6	–			1.7	–	10
Lisbon	27.7	15	27.0	14	17.0	9	6.6	3	5.0	2	3.7	2	5.5	2			2.5	1	48
Madeira	19.8	2			17.6	1	3.9	–	2.9	–	1.6	–	1.2	–	35.4	3	2.1	–	6
Portalegre	34.1	1	23.3	–	24.6	1	1.9	–	3.1	–	5.9	–	1.4	–			0.8	–	2
Porto	30.3	13	30.4	14	15.3	7	5.7	2	4.7	2	2.4	1	3.4	1			2.1	–	40
Santarém	27.9	3	27.3	3	23.3	3	3.8	–	4.5	–	4.1	–	2.5	–			1.6	–	9
Setúbal	31.3	7	17.2	4	20.3	4	5.4	1	6.0	1	7.7	1	4.3	1			2.6	–	19
Viana do Castelo	28.2	2	34.7	2	18.6	1	3.6	–	3.5	–	2.2	–	2.0	–			1.4	–	5
Vila Real	29.6	2	39.3	2	17.1	1	2.0	–	2.5	–	1.4	–	1.4	–			0.9	–	5
Viseu	27.5	3	36.4	3	19.5	2	2.8	–	2.8	–	1.4	–	1.7	–			1.2	–	8
Europe	16.2	1	14.2	–	18.3	1	2.4	–	2.7	–	1.0	–	1.7	–			2.2	–	2
Outside Europe	14.6	–	22.9	1	18.3	1	1.9	–	1.9	–	0.8	–	0.7	–			2.4	–	2
Total	28.0	78	28.0	77	18.1	50	4.9	8	4.4	5	3.2	4	3.2	4	0.8	3	1.9	1	230
Source: Official results page

=== Maps ===
Winner and seats by constituency.

2024 election by municipality: AD/MF (orange), PS (pink), CH (blue)

=== Demographics ===
Demographic	Size	AD	PS	CH	IL	BE	CDU	L	PAN	Others
Total vote	100%	28.8%	28.0%	18.1%	4.9%	4.4%	3.2%	3.2%	2.0%	7.5%
Sex
Men	49%	29%	27%	21%	6%	4%	4%	3%	1%	6%
Women	51%	29%	31%	15%	5%	6%	3%	3%	3%	5%
Age
18–34 years old	23%	28%	13%	25%	11%	6%	2%	6%	1%	8%
65 years and older	21%	28%	48%	8%	1%	3%	5%	1%	1%	5%
Education
No/with High-school	65%	26%	32%	22%	3%	4%	4%	2%	2%	5%
College graduate	35%	36%	23%	11%	8%	6%	3%	6%	2%	5%
Source: ICS/ISCTE–GfK/Metris exit poll

== Aftermath ==
Following the release of the results, Luis Montenegro claimed victory on behalf of AD early on 11 March, while Pedro Nuno Santos conceded defeat and said that the PS would now lead the opposition, and discounted the prospect of forming a left-leaning coalition. Minister of Finance Fernando Medina, who had been considered as a possible replacement as leader of PS, said that the defeat was due to the entire party and not Santos' leadership. Chega's André Ventura said that the results showed that the "two-party system in Portugal is finished." His party was congratulated by representatives of European right-wing populist parties for its performance. Montenegro reiterated that he would not come to a political agreement with Chega. President Marcelo Rebelo de Sousa, who was a member of PSD prior to his election, met with political parties between 14 March and 20 March.

Liberal Initiative leader Rui Rocha said that it was the responsibility of other parties to lead the formation of a government, but that his party would contribute as long as any proposals excluded Chega. CDU leader Paulo Raimundo blamed what he saw as misgovernance by the PS for the right-wing gains in the election, while PAN spokesperson Inês Sousa Real blamed President Marcelo Rebelo de Sousa in part for Chega's advances. Mariana Mortágua of the Left Bloc said that her party would either be a part of any left-leaning coalition or oppose any right-leaning government, and LIVRE leader Rui Tavares expressed satisfaction that his party grew to four seats and could form a parliamentary group for the first time.

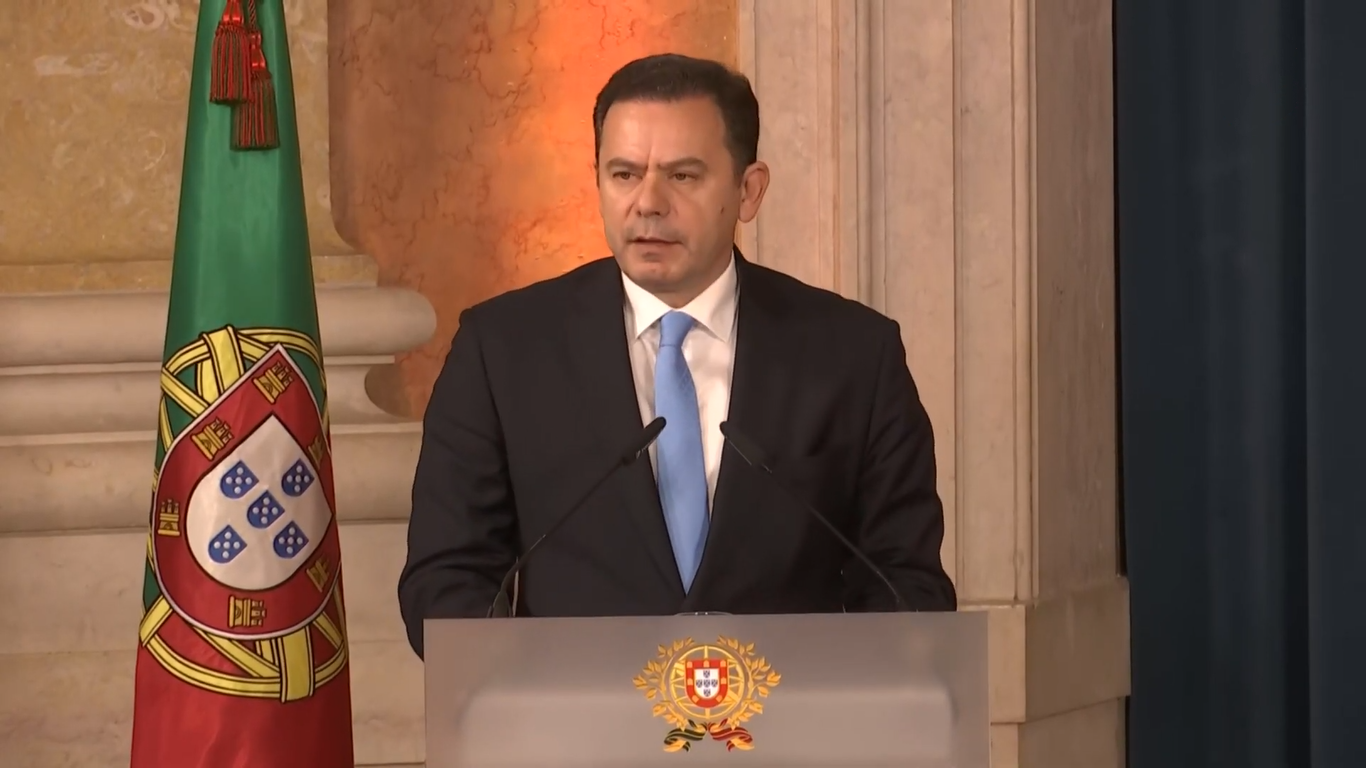
Luís Montenegro delivering his swearing in speech at Palace of Ajuda on 2 April 2024 in Lisbon.

Pedro Nuno Santos said in his concession speech that the PS would not vote in favour of a motion of rejection of the AD government, although he also said that "AD should not count on the support of PS to govern", implying that his party would vote against the AD government's State Budgets. André Ventura said that Chega would vote against the State Budgets unless AD negotiated with the party.

On 21 March, Luis Montenegro was formally asked by President Rebelo de Sousa to form a minority government following the latter's consultations with party leaders. The final, certified election results were published in the Portuguese official journal, Diário da República, on 23 March 2024. The new government was then presented and approved by President Rebelo de Sousa on 28 March and took office on 2 April.

=== 2025 budget crisis ===
The lack of a workable majority means that the AD minority government is forced to negotiate with Opposition parties to pass major legislation, including the 2025 state budget. The Government decided to start negotiations on the budget with the Socialist Party (PS) but the two were at odds regarding corporate tax cuts and the "Youth IRS" scheme, which provided an income tax rate cut for young people under the age of 35. The Government refused to drop these two policies, while PS said that if they remain in the budget, the party would vote against. President Marcelo Rebelo de Sousa warned that a lack of a deal would lead to snap legislative elections, and admitted he was indeed putting pressure on both the major parties to reach some kind of deal.

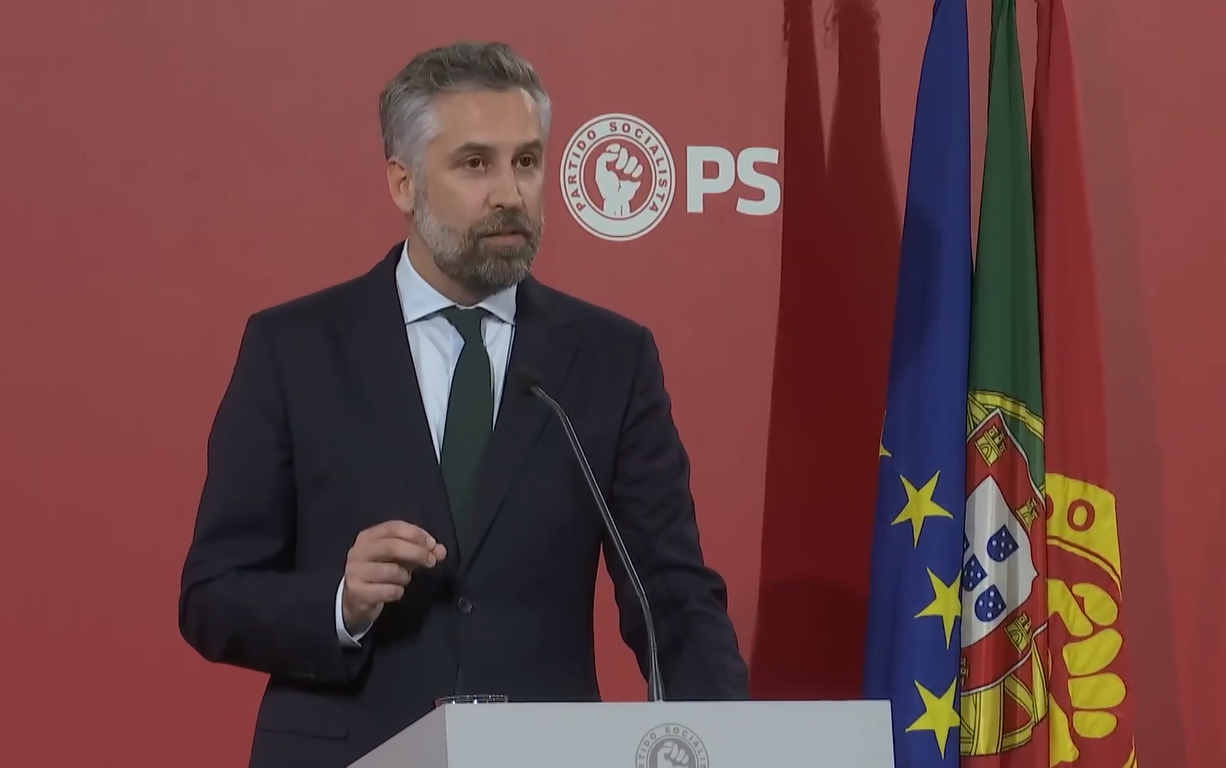
Pedro Nuno Santos announcing the abstention of the Socialists in the 2025 budget vote.

Luís Montenegro ultimately dropped several parts of his government's Youth IRS scheme and corporate tax cuts proposals and adapted them to PS policies, calling it an "irrecusable proposal" for the Socialists. Pedro Nuno Santos recognized the concessions made by the government, but pressed for more conditions on corporate tax cuts, mainly on their timing. Montenegro rejected these last conditions made by PS, but said he was "confident" in the budget being approved by Parliament. A week later, on 17 October 2024, PS leader Pedro Nuno Santos announced that the Socialist Party would abstain in the budget vote, thus ensuring its approval with the votes of the AD coalition. Though his conditions were not met, Santos justified the decision with the desire to avoid a snap election less than a year after the previous one, but stressed that the government was now "isolated" and "absolutely dependent" on the opposition. On 31 October, Parliament passed the budget in its first general reading by an 80–72 vote, with the 78 PS members abstaining:

2025 State Budget; Luís Montenegro (PSD)
Ballot →	31 October 2024
Required majority →	Simple
Yes: • PSD (78); • CDS–PP (2)	80 / 230
No: • CH (50); • IL (8); • BE (5); • PCP (4); • L (4); • PAN (1)	72 / 230
Abstentions: • PS (78)	78 / 230
Absentees	0 / 230
Result →	Approved

On 29 November 2024, after the approval of several amendments, some against the will of the government, the budget was reconfirmed in the final global vote by a 79–72 vote, with 77 PS members abstaining.

=== Fall of the government ===
Following the revelations in the Spinumviva case, around alleged conflicts of interests and payments to Luís Montenegro and his family via a business, called Spinumviva, while he was already in office, two motions of no confidence were presented but rejected by Parliament. However, after the Socialist Party (PS) announced a Parliamentary inquiry committee to investigate the Prime Minister, Montenegro announced a vote of confidence in his government, warning that its rejection would lead to early elections in May 2025. On 11 March 2025, Luís Montenegro government lost the vote of confidence and the government fell, the first since 1977.

The results of the vote: Yes No Absentees

Motion of confidence Luís Montenegro (PSD)
Ballot →	11 March 2025
Required majority →	Simple
Yes: • PSD (77); • IL (8); • CDS (2)	87 / 230
No: • PS (75); • CH (48); • BE (5); • PCP (4); • L (4); • PAN (1)	137 / 230
Abstentions	0 / 230
Absentees: • PS (3); • PSD (1); • CH (1); • Ind. Miguel Arruda (1)	6 / 230
Result →	Rejected

After the motion result was announced, President Marcelo Rebelo de Sousa held meetings with parties on 12 March, and a Council of State meeting on 13 March. President Marcelo Rebelo de Sousa called an early election for 18 May 2025.
