= Results breakdown of the 2025 Portuguese legislative election =

2025 Portuguese legislative election
- 18 May 2025
- All 230 seats in the Assembly of the Republic; 116 seats needed for a majority
- Turnout: 58.3%
Party	Leader	Vote %	Seats	+/–
AD (Note: Compared with the 2024 Democratic Alliance (PSD/CDS/PPM))	Luís Montenegro	31.8%	91	+11
CH	André Ventura	22.8%	60	+10
PS	Pedro Nuno Santos	22.8%	58	−20
IL	Rui Rocha	5.4%	9	+1
LIVRE	Rui Tavares	4.1%	6	+2
CDU	Paulo Raimundo	2.9%	3	−1
BE	Mariana Mortágua	2.0%	1	−4
PAN	Inês Sousa Real	1.4%	1	0
JPP	Élvio Sousa	0.3%	1	+1
This lists parties that won seats. See the complete results below.
Prime Minister before
Luís Montenegro; PSD

This is the results breakdown of the Assembly of the Republic election held in Portugal on 18 May 2025. The following tables show detailed results in each of the country's 22 electoral constituencies.

The elections were won by the center-right Democratic Alliance (AD), led by Luís Montenegro, gathering 31.8 percent of the votes and 91 seats. The right-wing populist Chega party became the main opposition party with 60 seats and 22.8 percent of the votes, while the Socialist Party (PS) fell to third place with also 22.8 percent of the votes and 58 seats. Turnout in Portugal alone reached 64.4 percent, the third highest rate since 1995, while as a whole, including overseas results, it stood at 58.3 percent.

== Electoral system ==
The Assembly of the Republic has 230 members elected to four-year terms. The number of seats to be elected by each district depends on the district magnitude. 226 seats are allocated proportionally by the number of registered voters in the 18 Districts in Mainland Portugal, plus Azores and Madeira, and 4 fixed seats are allocated for overseas voters, 2 seats for voters in Europe and another 2 seats for voters Outside Europe. The 230 members of Parliament are elected using the D'Hondt method and by a closed list proportional representation system. Members represent the country as a whole and not the constituencies in which they were elected.

== Summary ==
=== Nationwide results ===
Summary of the 18 May 2025 Assembly of the Republic elections results
Parties	Votes	%	±pp swing	MPs				
Parties	Votes	%	±pp swing	2024	2025	±	%	±
AD – PSD/CDS Coalition (PSD/CDS–PP)	1,971,602	31.20	▲3.0	78	88	▲10	38.26	▲4.4
PSD/CDS/PPM coalition (PSD/CDS–PP/PPM) (Note: Only in Azores.)	36,886	0.58	▼0.1	2	3	▲1	1.30	▲0.4
Total AD – PSD/CDS Coalition	2,008,488	31.78	▲2.9	80	91	▲11	39.57	▲4.8
Socialist	1,442,546	22.83	▼5.2	78	58	▼20	25.22	▼8.7
Chega	1,438,554	22.76	▲4.7	50	60	▲10	26.09	▲4.4
Liberal Initiative	338,974	5.36	▲0.3	8	9	▲1	3.91	▲0.4
LIVRE	257,291	4.07	▲0.8	4	6	▲2	2.61	▲0.9
Unitary Democratic Coalition	183,686	2.91	▼0.2	4	3	▼1	1.30	▼0.4
Left Bloc	125,808	1.99	▼2.5	5	1	▼4	0.43	▼1.8
People–Animals–Nature	86,930	1.38	▼0.6	1	1	0	0.43	0.0
National Democratic Alternative	81,660	1.29	▼0.3	0	0	0	0.00	0.0
Together for the People	20,900	0.33	▲0.0	0	1	▲1	0.43	▲0.4
React, Include, Recycle	14,021	0.22	▼0.2	0	0	0	0.00	0.0
Volt Portugal	12,150	0.19	▲0.0	0	0	0	0.00	0.0
Portuguese Workers' Communist	11,896	0.19	▼0.0	0	0	0	0.00	0.0
New Right	10,216	0.16	▼0.1	0	0	0	0.00	0.0
Rise Up	9,046	0.14	▲0.1	0	0	0	0.00	0.0
Liberal Social	7,332	0.12	—N/a	—N/a	0	—N/a	0.00	—N/a
People's Monarchist	5,616	0.09	▲0.1	0	0	0	0.00	0.0
We, the Citizens!	3,304	0.05	▲0.1	0	0	0	0.00	0.0
Earth (Note: Compared with the 2024 Alternative 21 coalition (MPT/Alliance).)	478	0.01	▼0.1	0	0	0	0.00	0.0
Labour	425	0.01	▼0.0	0	0	0	0.00	0.0
Total valid	6,059,321	95.88	▲0.2	230	230	0	100.00	0.0
Blank ballots	87,654	1.39	0.0					
Invalid ballots	172,994	2.74	▼0.2					
Total	6,319,969	100.00						
Registered voters/turnout	10,848,816	58.25	▼1.6					
Source: Comissão Nacional de Eleições

== Results by constituency ==
=== Azores ===
Summary of the 18 May 2025 Assembly of the Republic elections results in Azores
Parties	Votes	%	±pp swing	MPs		
Parties	Votes	%	±pp swing	2024	2025	±
PSD/CDS/PPM coalition (PSD/CDS–PP/PPM)	36,879	36.56	▼3.2	2	3	▲1
Socialist	23,810	23.60	▼5.6	2	1	▼1
Chega	23,053	22.85	▲7.1	1	1	0
Liberal Initiative	3,481	3.45	▲0.8	0	0	0
LIVRE	2,534	2.51	▲0.8	0	0	0
Left Bloc	2,106	2.09	▼1.3	0	0	0
National Democratic Alternative	1,666	1.65	▲0.9	0	0	0
People–Animals–Nature	1,314	1.30	▼0.3	0	0	0
Unitary Democratic Coalition	1,219	1.21	▲0.1	0	0	0
Together for the People	271	0.27	▲0.1	0	0	0
React, Include, Recycle	140	0.14	▲0.0	0	0	0
Rise Up	119	0.12	▲0.0	0	0	0
Earth	113	0.11	—N/a	—N/a	0	—N/a
Total valid	96,705	95.86	▼0.7	5	5	0
Blank ballots	3,011	2.98	▲0.5			
Invalid ballots	1,167	1.16	▲0.2			
Total	100,883	100.00				
Registered voters/turnout	230,305	43.81	▼2.4			

=== Aveiro ===
Summary of the 18 May 2025 Assembly of the Republic elections results in Aveiro
Parties	Votes	%	±pp swing	MPs		
Parties	Votes	%	±pp swing	2024	2025	±
AD – PSD/CDS Coalition (PSD/CDS–PP)	163,617	39.48	▲4.4	7	7	0
Socialist	90,010	21.72	▼6.0	5	4	▼1
Chega	85,760	20.69	▲3.4	3	4	▲1
Liberal Initiative	23,444	5.66	▲0.6	1	1	0
LIVRE	12,805	3.09	▲0.9	0	0	0
Left Bloc	7,015	1.69	▼2.4	0	0	0
National Democratic Alternative	6,974	1.68	▲0.3	0	0	0
People–Animals–Nature	5,131	1.24	▼0.5	0	0	0
Unitary Democratic Coalition	4,923	1.19	▼0.2	0	0	0
Portuguese Workers' Communist	1,005	0.24	▼0.1	0	0	0
React, Include, Recycle	933	0.23	▼0.2	0	0	0
Volt Portugal	592	0.14	0.0	0	0	0
Rise Up	592	0.13	▲0.0	0	0	0
New Right	472	0.11	▼0.1	0	0	0
People's Monarchist	304	0.07	—N/a	—N/a	0	—N/a
We, the Citizens!	299	0.07	—N/a	—N/a	0	—N/a
Total valid	403,812	97.43	▲0.1	16	16	0
Blank ballots	6,662	1.62	▲0.1			
Invalid ballots	3,944	0.95	▼0.2			
Total	414,418	100.00				
Registered voters/turnout	642,044	64.55	▼0.4			

=== Beja ===
Summary of the 18 May 2025 Assembly of the Republic elections results in Beja
Parties	Votes	%	±pp swing	MPs		
Parties	Votes	%	±pp swing	2024	2025	±
Chega	20,447	27.73	▲6.2	1	1	0
Socialist	19,536	26.49	▼5.2	1	1	0
AD – PSD/CDS Coalition (PSD/CDS–PP)	15,407	20.89	▲4.2	1	1	0
Unitary Democratic Coalition	10,000	13.56	▼1.4	0	0	0
LIVRE	1,547	2.10	▲0.3	0	0	0
Liberal Initiative	1,439	1.95	▼0.3	0	0	0
Left Bloc	1,365	1.85	▼2.6	0	0	0
National Democratic Alternative	713	0.97	▼0.1	0	0	0
People–Animals–Nature	636	0.86	▼0.3	0	0	0
Portuguese Workers' Communist	455	0.62	▼0.2	0	0	0
React, Include, Recycle	135	0.18	▼0.0	0	0	0
New Right	97	0.13	▼0.0	0	0	0
Volt Portugal	93	0.13	0.0	0	0	0
Rise Up	87	0.12	▼0.0	0	0	0
People's Monarchist	84	0.11	—N/a	—N/a	0	—N/a
Total valid	72,041	97.70	▲0.4	3	3	0
Blank ballots	1,012	1.37	▼0.1			
Invalid ballots	689	0.93	▼0.3			
Total	73,742	100.00				
Registered voters/turnout	118,320	62.32	▼2.3			

=== Braga ===
Summary of the 18 May 2025 Assembly of the Republic elections results in Braga
Parties	Votes	%	±pp swing	MPs		
Parties	Votes	%	±pp swing	2024	2025	±
AD – PSD/CDS Coalition (PSD/CDS–PP)	198,180	36.34	▲3.1	8	8	0
Socialist	125,539	23.02	▼5.2	6	5	▼1
Chega	119,917	21.99	▲5.1	4	5	▲1
Liberal Initiative	36,687	6.73	▲0.6	1	1	0
LIVRE	16,615	3.05	▲0.7	0	0	0
Left Bloc	10,029	1.84	▼2.0	0	0	0
Unitary Democratic Coalition	9,180	1.68	▼0.1	0	0	0
National Democratic Alternative	5,329	0.98	▼0.8	0	0	0
People–Animals–Nature	5,181	0.95	▼0.5	0	0	0
React, Include, Recycle	1,086	0.20	▼0.2	0	0	0
New Right	888	0.16	▼0.3	0	0	0
Volt Portugal	694	0.13	▼0.0	0	0	0
Rise Up	529	0.10	▲0.0	0	0	0
Together for the People	307	0.06	▼0.0	0	0	0
People's Monarchist	272	0.05	—N/a	—N/a	0	—N/a
Total valid	530,433	97.26	▼0.1	19	19	0
Blank ballots	9,014	1.65	▲0.1			
Invalid ballots	5,930	1.09	▲0.1			
Total	545,377	100.00				
Registered voters/turnout	782,367	69.71	▼1.6			

=== Bragança ===
Summary of the 18 May 2025 Assembly of the Republic elections results in Bragança
Parties	Votes	%	±pp swing	MPs		
Parties	Votes	%	±pp swing	2024	2025	±
AD – PSD/CDS Coalition (PSD/CDS–PP)	30,611	43.74	▲3.7	2	2	0
Socialist	17,796	25.43	▼4.2	1	1	0
Chega	14,288	20.42	▲2.2	0	0	0
Liberal Initiative	1,527	2.18	▲0.5	0	0	0
National Democratic Alternative	1,071	1.53	▼0.7	0	0	0
LIVRE	792	1.13	▲0.1	0	0	0
Unitary Democratic Coalition	725	1.04	▼0.1	0	0	0
Left Bloc	591	0.84	▼1.1	0	0	0
People–Animals–Nature	469	0.67	▼0.1	0	0	0
React, Include, Recycle	97	0.14	▼0.1	0	0	0
Volt Portugal	86	0.12	—N/a	—N/a	0	—N/a
Rise Up	80	0.11	▼0.1	0	0	0
People's Monarchist	66	0.09	—N/a	—N/a	0	—N/a
Total valid	68,199	97.45	▲0.0	3	3	0
Blank ballots	854	1.22	0.0			
Invalid ballots	930	1.33	▼0.0			
Total	69,983	100.00				
Registered voters/turnout	132,768	52.71	▼1.4			

=== Castelo Branco ===
Summary of the 18 May 2025 Assembly of the Republic elections results in Castelo Branco
Parties	Votes	%	±pp swing	MPs		
Parties	Votes	%	±pp swing	2024	2025	±
AD – PSD/CDS Coalition (PSD/CDS–PP)	33,616	32.30	▲3.8	1	2	▲1
Socialist	29,751	28.59	▼5.6	2	1	▼1
Chega	24,313	23.36	▲3.9	1	1	0
Liberal Initiative	3,143	3.02	▲0.3	0	0	0
LIVRE	2,652	2.55	▲0.5	0	0	0
Unitary Democratic Coalition	2,227	2.14	▼0.1	0	0	0
National Democratic Alternative	1,872	1.80	▲0.4	0	0	0
Left Bloc	1,715	1.65	▼2.5	0	0	0
People–Animals–Nature	944	0.91	▼0.4	0	0	0
Portuguese Workers' Communist	300	0.29	▼0.1	0	0	0
React, Include, Recycle	199	0.19	▼0.1	0	0	0
Volt Portugal	198	0.19	▲0.0	0	0	0
Rise Up	154	0.15	▲0.1	0	0	0
People's Monarchist	145	0.14	—N/a	—N/a	0	—N/a
Total valid	101,229	97.27	▲0.1	4	4	0
Blank ballots	1,491	1.43	▲0.0			
Invalid ballots	1,356	1.30	▲0.1			
Total	104,076	100.00				
Registered voters/turnout	162,574	64.02	▼2.2			

=== Coimbra ===
Summary of the 18 May 2025 Assembly of the Republic elections results in Coimbra
Parties	Votes	%	±pp swing	MPs		
Parties	Votes	%	±pp swing	2024	2025	±
AD – PSD/CDS Coalition (PSD/CDS–PP)	79,524	34.38	▲3.8	3	4	▲1
Socialist	63,348	27.39	▼5.3	4	3	▼1
Chega	42,527	18.39	▲2.9	2	2	0
Liberal Initiative	10,273	4.44	▲0.4	0	0	0
LIVRE	9,392	4.06	▲1.3	0	0	0
Unitary Democratic Coalition	5,796	2.51	▼0.3	0	0	0
Left Bloc	5,027	2.17	▼2.9	0	0	0
National Democratic Alternative	3,752	1.62	▲0.6	0	0	0
People–Animals–Nature	2,828	1.22	▼0.4	0	0	0
React, Include, Recycle	474	0.20	▼0.1	0	0	0
Volt Portugal	400	0.17	▼0.0	0	0	0
Rise Up	340	0.15	▲0.1	0	0	0
New Right	245	0.11	▼0.1	0	0	0
People's Monarchist	235	0.10	—N/a	—N/a	0	—N/a
Together for the People	154	0.07	▼0.0	0	0	0
Total valid	224,315	96.99	▲0.0	9	9	0
Blank ballots	4,567	1.97	▼0.0			
Invalid ballots	2,396	1.04	▼0.1			
Total	231,278	100.00				
Registered voters/turnout	370,773	62.38	▼2.7			

=== Évora ===
Summary of the 18 May 2025 Assembly of the Republic elections results in Évora
Parties	Votes	%	±pp swing	MPs		
Parties	Votes	%	±pp swing	2024	2025	±
Socialist	23,616	27.81	▼5.0	1	1	0
Chega	21,080	24.82	▲4.8	1	1	0
AD – PSD/CDS Coalition (PSD/CDS–PP)	21,070	24.81	▲2.4	1	1	0
Unitary Democratic Coalition	8,637	10.17	▼0.7	0	0	0
Liberal Initiative	2,415	2.84	▲0.3	0	0	0
LIVRE	2,296	2.70	▲0.7	0	0	0
Left Bloc	1,487	1.75	▼2.5	0	0	0
National Democratic Alternative	983	1.16	▲0.2	0	0	0
People–Animals–Nature	790	0.93	▼0.2	0	0	0
Volt Portugal	142	0.17	0.0	0	0	0
React, Include, Recycle	138	0.16	▼0.1	0	0	0
We, the Citizens!	106	0.12	—N/a	—N/a	0	—N/a
Rise Up	83	0.10	▲0.0	0	0	0
People's Monarchist	68	0.08	—N/a	—N/a	0	—N/a
Total valid	82,911	97.63	▼0.1	3	3	0
Blank ballots	1,263	1.49	▲0.1			
Invalid ballots	749	0.88	▲0.0			
Total	84,923	100.00				
Registered voters/turnout	132,620	64.03	▼3.0			

=== Faro ===
Summary of the 18 May 2025 Assembly of the Republic elections results in Faro
Parties	Votes	%	±pp swing	MPs		
Parties	Votes	%	±pp swing	2024	2025	±
Chega	78,168	33.90	▲6.7	3	4	▲1
AD – PSD/CDS Coalition (PSD/CDS–PP)	59,353	25.74	▲3.3	3	3	0
Socialist	47,293	20.51	▼5.0	3	2	▼1
Liberal Initiative	10,047	4.36	▼0.2	0	0	0
LIVRE	7,735	3.35	▲0.6	0	0	0
Unitary Democratic Coalition	6,170	2.68	▼0.5	0	0	0
Left Bloc	5,724	2.48	▼3.3	0	0	0
National Democratic Alternative	4,182	1.81	▼0.2	0	0	0
People–Animals–Nature	4,161	1.80	▼0.8	0	0	0
React, Include, Recycle	512	0.22	▼0.3	0	0	0
Rise Up	486	0.21	▲0.1	0	0	0
Volt Portugal	437	0.19	▼0.1	0	0	0
New Right	423	0.18	▼0.1	0	0	0
People's Monarchist	332	0.14	—N/a	—N/a	0	—N/a
Together for the People	262	0.11	▼0.2	0	0	0
Total valid	225,285	97.71	▲0.3	9	9	0
Blank ballots	3,253	1.41	▼0.0			
Invalid ballots	2,024	0.88	▼0.3			
Total	230,562	100.00				
Registered voters/turnout	383,944	60.05	▼1.7			

=== Guarda ===
Summary of the 18 May 2025 Assembly of the Republic elections results in Guarda
Parties	Votes	%	±pp swing	MPs		
Parties	Votes	%	±pp swing	2024	2025	±
AD – PSD/CDS Coalition (PSD/CDS–PP)	32,291	39.56	▲5.5	1	1	0
Socialist	21,550	26.40	▼5.5	1	1	0
Chega	17,247	21.13	▲2.5	1	1	0
Liberal Initiative	1,994	2.44	▲0.2	0	0	0
National Democratic Alternative	1,660	2.03	▼0.6	0	0	0
LIVRE	1,229	1.51	▲0.2	0	0	0
Unitary Democratic Coalition	1,037	1.27	▼0.3	0	0	0
Left Bloc	1,010	1.24	▼1.5	0	0	0
People–Animals–Nature	607	0.74	▼0.3	0	0	0
People's Monarchist	170	0.21	—N/a	—N/a	0	—N/a
React, Include, Recycle	134	0.16	▼0.2	0	0	0
Volt Portugal	118	0.14	▲0.0	0	0	0
We, the Citizens!	117	0.14	—N/a	—N/a	0	—N/a
Rise Up	80	0.10	▼0.1	0	0	0
Total valid	79,244	97.09	▲0.0	3	3	0
Blank ballots	1,179	1.44	▲0.0			
Invalid ballots	1,198	1.47	▼0.1			
Total	81,621	100.00				
Registered voters/turnout	139,506	58.51	▼1.7			

=== Leiria ===
Summary of the 18 May 2025 Assembly of the Republic elections results in Leiria
Parties	Votes	%	±pp swing	MPs		
Parties	Votes	%	±pp swing	2024	2025	±
AD – PSD/CDS Coalition (PSD/CDS–PP)	98,243	37.06	▲1.9	5	5	0
Chega	61,162	23.07	▲3.4	2	3	▲1
Socialist	50,321	18.98	▼3.5	3	2	▼1
Liberal Initiative	15,971	6.02	▲0.4	0	0	0
LIVRE	9,299	3.51	▲0.9	0	0	0
National Democratic Alternative	5,745	2.17	▲0.5	0	0	0
Unitary Democratic Coalition	5,468	2.06	▼0.3	0	0	0
Left Bloc	5,099	1.92	▼2.4	0	0	0
People–Animals–Nature	3,103	1.17	▼0.5	0	0	0
New Right	723	0.27	0.0	0	0	0
React, Include, Recycle	587	0.22	▼0.2	0	0	0
Volt Portugal	487	0.18	▼0.0	0	0	0
Rise Up	398	0.15	▲0.0	0	0	0
People's Monarchist	323	0.12	—N/a	—N/a	0	—N/a
Total valid	256,929	96.91	▲0.1	10	10	0
Blank ballots	4,974	1.88	▲0.0			
Invalid ballots	3,206	1.21	▼0.1			
Total	265,109	100.00				
Registered voters/turnout	411,995	64.35	▼2.0			

=== Lisbon ===
Summary of the 18 May 2025 Assembly of the Republic elections results in Lisbon
Parties	Votes	%	±pp swing	MPs		
Parties	Votes	%	±pp swing	2024	2025	±
AD – PSD/CDS Coalition (PSD/CDS–PP)	362,506	28.47	▲1.5	14	15	▲1
Socialist	301,492	23.67	▼4.0	15	12	▼3
Chega	265,718	20.87	▲3.9	9	11	▲2
Liberal Initiative	97,098	7.62	▲1.0	3	4	▲1
LIVRE	87,530	6.87	▲1.4	2	3	▲1
Unitary Democratic Coalition	45,430	3.57	▼0.1	2	1	▼1
Left Bloc	29,914	2.35	▼2.6	2	1	▼1
People–Animals–Nature	23,369	1.84	▼0.7	1	1	0
National Democratic Alternative	15,415	1.21	▼0.2	0	0	0
Portuguese Workers' Communist	3,666	0.29	▲0.0	0	0	0
Volt Portugal	3,156	0.25	▲0.0	0	0	0
React, Include, Recycle	2,199	0.17	▼0.0	0	0	0
Rise Up	2,152	0.17	▲0.1	0	0	0
New Right	2,016	0.16	▼0.0	0	0	0
Liberal Social	1,894	0.15	—N/a	—N/a	0	—N/a
People's Monarchist	945	0.07	—N/a	—N/a	0	—N/a
Together for the People	815	0.06	0.0	0	0	0
We, the Citizens!	755	0.06	—N/a	—N/a	0	—N/a
Total valid	1,246,070	97.85	▲0.1	48	48	0
Blank ballots	16,083	1.26	▲0.1			
Invalid ballots	11,347	0.89	▼0.2			
Total	1,273,500	100.00				
Registered voters/turnout	1,912,945	66.57	▼2.3			

=== Madeira ===
Summary of the 18 May 2025 Assembly of the Republic elections results in Madeira
Parties	Votes	%	±pp swing	MPs		
Parties	Votes	%	±pp swing	2024	2025	±
AD – PSD/CDS Coalition (PSD/CDS–PP) (Note: Compared with the 2024 Madeira First coalition.)	57,447	41.35	▲6.0	3	3	0
Chega	29,038	20.90	▲3.3	1	1	0
Socialist	18,704	13.46	▼6.3	2	1	▼1
Together for the People	17,115	12.32	▲2.7	0	1	▲1
Liberal Initiative	3,657	2.63	▼1.3	0	0	0
Left Bloc	1,870	1.35	▼1.6	0	0	0
Unitary Democratic Coalition	1,763	1.27	▼0.3	0	0	0
LIVRE	1,749	1.26	▲0.1	0	0	0
National Democratic Alternative	1,554	1.12	▼0.5	0	0	0
People–Animals–Nature	1,445	1.04	▼1.1	0	0	0
People's Monarchist	454	0.33	▲0.0	0	0	0
New Right	432	0.31	—N/a	—N/a	0	—N/a
Labour	421	0.30	▼0.5	0	0	0
Earth	358	0.26	▲0.1	0	0	0
React, Include, Recycle	346	0.25	▼0.2	0	0	0
Rise Up	187	0.13	▲0.1	0	0	0
Total valid	136,540	98.28	▲0.6	6	6	0
Blank ballots	549	0.40	▼0.1			
Invalid ballots	1,833	1.32	▼0.5			
Total	138,922	100.00				
Registered voters/turnout	255,801	54.31	▼4.5			

=== Portalegre ===
Summary of the 18 May 2025 Assembly of the Republic elections results in Portalegre
Parties	Votes	%	±pp swing	MPs		
Parties	Votes	%	±pp swing	2024	2025	±
Chega	17,220	29.90	▲5.3	1	1	0
Socialist	16,125	28.00	▼6.1	1	1	0
AD – PSD/CDS Coalition (PSD/CDS–PP)	15,458	26.84	▲3.5	0	0	0
Unitary Democratic Coalition	2,977	5.17	▼0.7	0	0	0
Liberal Initiative	1,107	1.92	▲0.0	0	0	0
LIVRE	986	1.71	▲0.3	0	0	0
Left Bloc	733	1.27	▼1.8	0	0	0
National Democratic Alternative	619	1.07	▲0.1	0	0	0
People–Animals–Nature	393	0.68	▲0.1	0	0	0
Portuguese Workers' Communist	263	0.46	▼0.0	0	0	0
React, Include, Recycle	79	0.14	▼0.1	0	0	0
Volt Portugal	72	0.13	▲0.0	0	0	0
Rise Up	52	0.09	0.0	0	0	0
People's Monarchist	51	0.09	—N/a	—N/a	0	—N/a
Total valid	56,135	97.46	▲0.1	2	2	0
Blank ballots	834	1.45	▼0.1			
Invalid ballots	627	1.09	▲0.0			
Total	57,596	100.00				
Registered voters/turnout	92,532	62.24	▼2.9			

=== Porto ===
Summary of the 18 May 2025 Assembly of the Republic elections results in Porto
Parties	Votes	%	±pp swing	MPs		
Parties	Votes	%	±pp swing	2024	2025	±
AD – PSD/CDS Coalition (PSD/CDS–PP)	375,606	34.22	▲3.8	14	15	▲1
Socialist	263,793	24.04	▼6.3	13	11	▼2
Chega	226,806	20.67	▲5.4	7	9	▲2
Liberal Initiative	66,926	6.10	▲0.4	2	2	0
LIVRE	47,156	4.30	▲1.0	1	2	▲1
Unitary Democratic Coalition	25,002	2.28	▼0.1	1	1	0
Left Bloc	22,192	2.02	▼2.7	2	0	▼2
People–Animals–Nature	16,433	1.50	▼0.6	0	0	0
National Democratic Alternative	11,275	1.03	▼0.8	0	0	0
React, Include, Recycle	3,967	0.36	▼0.4	0	0	0
Liberal Social	3,595	0.33	—N/a	—N/a	0	—N/a
Volt Portugal	2,573	0.23	▲0.1	0	0	0
Portuguese Workers' Communist	2,573	0.20	▼0.1	0	0	0
New Right	1,808	0.16	0.0	0	0	0
Rise Up	1,771	0.16	▲0.1	0	0	0
We, the Citizens!	1,105	0.10	▲0.0	0	0	0
Together for the People	749	0.07	▼0.0	0	0	0
People's Monarchist	596	0.05	—N/a	—N/a	0	—N/a
Total valid	1,073,532	97.81	▲0.1	40	40	0
Blank ballots	14,381	1.31	▲0.0			
Invalid ballots	9,610	0.88	▼0.1			
Total	1,097,523	100.00				
Registered voters/turnout	1,591,357	68.97	▼1.1			

=== Santarém ===
Summary of the 18 May 2025 Assembly of the Republic elections results in Santarém
Parties	Votes	%	±pp swing	MPs		
Parties	Votes	%	±pp swing	2024	2025	±
AD – PSD/CDS Coalition (PSD/CDS–PP)	74,716	30.60	▲3.3	3	4	▲1
Chega	68,687	28.13	▲4.8	3	3	0
Socialist	55,545	22.75	▼5.1	3	2	▼1
Liberal Initiative	9,593	3.93	▲0.1	0	0	0
Unitary Democratic Coalition	8,780	3.60	▼0.5	0	0	0
LIVRE	7,857	3.22	▲0.7	0	0	0
Left Bloc	4,367	1.79	▼2.7	0	0	0
National Democratic Alternative	3,969	1.63	▲0.2	0	0	0
People–Animals–Nature	2,749	1.13	▼0.5	0	0	0
React, Include, Recycle	538	0.22	▼0.2	0	0	0
Volt Portugal	498	0.20	▼0.0	0	0	0
Rise Up	424	0.17	▲0.1	0	0	0
People's Monarchist	247	0.10	—N/a	—N/a	0	—N/a
Total valid	237,970	97.45	▲0.2	9	9	0
Blank ballots	3,703	1.52	▲0.0			
Invalid ballots	2,505	1.03	▼0.2			
Total	244,178	100.00				
Registered voters/turnout	377,415	64.70	▼1.9			

=== Setúbal ===
Summary of the 18 May 2025 Assembly of the Republic elections results in Setúbal
Parties	Votes	%	±pp swing	MPs		
Parties	Votes	%	±pp swing	2024	2025	±
Chega	129,569	26.38	▲6.1	4	6	▲2
Socialist	122,679	24.97	▼6.3	7	5	▼2
AD – PSD/CDS Coalition (PSD/CDS–PP)	103,181	21.01	▲3.8	4	5	▲1
Unitary Democratic Coalition	34,956	7.12	▼0.6	1	1	0
Liberal Initiative	28,700	5.84	▲0.4	1	1	0
LIVRE	27,057	5.51	▲1.2	1	1	0
Left Bloc	13,068	2.66	▼3.5	1	0	▼1
People–Animals–Nature	9,229	1.88	▼0.7	0	0	0
National Democratic Alternative	4,187	0.85	▼0.7	0	0	0
Portuguese Workers' Communist	2,990	0.61	▲0.1	0	0	0
Volt Portugal	886	0.18	▲0.0	0	0	0
Liberal Social	847	0.17	—N/a	—N/a	0	—N/a
React, Include, Recycle	749	0.15	▼0.1	0	0	0
Rise Up	714	0.15	▲0.0	0	0	0
New Right	682	0.14	▼0.1	0	0	0
Together for the People	453	0.09	0.0	0	0	0
We, the Citizens!	389	0.08	—N/a	—N/a	0	—N/a
People's Monarchist	320	0.07	—N/a	—N/a	0	—N/a
Total valid	480,656	97.85	▲0.1	19	19	0
Blank ballots	6,094	1.24	0.0			
Invalid ballots	4,467	0.91	▼0.1			
Total	491,217	100.00				
Registered voters/turnout	754,726	65.09	▼1.8			

=== Viana do Castelo ===
Summary of the 18 May 2025 Assembly of the Republic elections results in Viana do Castelo
Parties	Votes	%	±pp swing	MPs		
Parties	Votes	%	±pp swing	2024	2025	±
AD – PSD/CDS Coalition (PSD/CDS–PP)	55,376	39.58	▲4.9	2	3	▲1
Chega	32,141	22.97	▲4.4	1	1	0
Socialist	30,393	21.72	▼6.4	2	1	▼1
Liberal Initiative	5,344	3.82	▲0.2	0	0	0
LIVRE	3,640	2.60	▲0.6	0	0	0
Unitary Democratic Coalition	2,763	1.97	▼0.2	0	0	0
Left Bloc	2,285	1.63	▼1.8	0	0	0
National Democratic Alternative	2,047	1.46	▼0.2	0	0	0
People–Animals–Nature	1,300	0.93	▼0.5	0	0	0
React, Include, Recycle	315	0.23	▼0.2	0	0	0
Rise Up	275	0.20	▲0.1	0	0	0
Volt Portugal	209	0.15	▲0.1	0	0	0
People's Monarchist	145	0.10	—N/a	—N/a	0	—N/a
Total valid	136,233	97.37	▲0.3	5	5	0
Blank ballots	2,363	1.69	▼0.2			
Invalid ballots	1,319	0.94	▼0.1			
Total	139,915	100.00				
Registered voters/turnout	232,581	60.16	▼1.0			

=== Vila Real ===
Summary of the 18 May 2025 Assembly of the Republic elections results in Vila Real
Parties	Votes	%	±pp swing	MPs		
Parties	Votes	%	±pp swing	2024	2025	±
AD – PSD/CDS Coalition (PSD/CDS–PP)	50,522	44.39	▲5.1	2	3	▲1
Socialist	27,990	24.59	▼5.0	2	1	▼1
Chega	22,754	19.99	▲2.9	1	1	0
Liberal Initiative	2,481	2.18	▲0.2	0	0	0
LIVRE	1,743	1.53	▲0.1	0	0	0
National Democratic Alternative	1,713	1.51	▼1.0	0	0	0
Unitary Democratic Coalition	1,401	1.23	▼0.2	0	0	0
Left Bloc	1,150	1.01	▼1.5	0	0	0
People–Animals–Nature	775	0.68	▼0.3	0	0	0
People's Monarchist	186	0.16	—N/a	—N/a	0	—N/a
React, Include, Recycle	182	0.16	▼0.1	0	0	0
Rise Up	130	0.11	▲0.0	0	0	0
Volt Portugal	111	0.10	0.0	0	0	0
Total valid	111,138	97.66	▲0.3	5	5	0
Blank ballots	1,359	1.19	▼0.1			
Invalid ballots	1,309	1.15	▼0.2			
Total	113,806	100.00				
Registered voters/turnout	206,897	55.01	▼1.1			

=== Viseu ===
Summary of the 18 May 2025 Assembly of the Republic elections results in Viseu
Parties	Votes	%	±pp swing	MPs		
Parties	Votes	%	±pp swing	2024	2025	±
AD – PSD/CDS Coalition (PSD/CDS–PP)	88,374	42.73	▲6.3	3	4	▲1
Chega	45,794	22.14	▲2.6	2	2	0
Socialist	45,210	21.86	▼5.6	3	2	▼1
Liberal Initiative	6,465	3.13	▲0.3	0	0	0
LIVRE	4,394	2.12	▲0.4	0	0	0
National Democratic Alternative	4,188	2.02	▼1.1	0	0	0
Unitary Democratic Coalition	2,489	1.20	▼0.2	0	0	0
Left Bloc	2,464	1.19	▼1.6	0	0	0
React, Include, Recycle	547	0.26	▼0.2	0	0	0
New Right	431	0.21	▼0.1	0	0	0
People's Monarchist	344	0.17	—N/a	—N/a	0	—N/a
Volt Portugal	246	0.12	▼0.1	0	0	0
Rise Up	227	0.11	▲0.0	0	0	0
Total valid	201,173	97.27	▲0.1	8	8	0
Blank ballots	3,320	1.61	▲0.0			
Invalid ballots	2,324	1.12	▼0.1			
Total	206,817	100.00				
Registered voters/turnout	334,039	61.91	▼1.1			

=== Europe ===
Summary of the 18 May 2025 Assembly of the Republic elections results in Europe
Parties	Votes	%	±pp swing	MPs		
Parties	Votes	%	±pp swing	2024	2025	±
Chega	71,990	28.20	▲9.9	1	1	0
AD – PSD/CDS Coalition (PSD/CDS–PP)	37,406	14.65	▲0.4	0	1	▲1
Socialist	34,574	13.54	▼2.7	1	0	▼1
Liberal Initiative	6,452	2.53	▲0.1	0	0	0
LIVRE	5,626	2.20	▲0.5	0	0	0
Left Bloc	4,743	1.86	▼0.9	0	0	0
People–Animals–Nature	4,071	1.59	▼0.6	0	0	0
Unitary Democratic Coalition	2,213	0.87	▼0.1	0	0	0
National Democratic Alternative	1,201	0.47	▲0.1	0	0	0
Volt Portugal	945	0.37	▲0.1	0	0	0
Portuguese Workers' Communist	785	0.31	▼0.0	0	0	0
Together for the People	551	0.22	▼0.0	0	0	0
New Right	504	0.20	▼0.0	0	0	0
Liberal Social	442	0.17	—N/a	—N/a	0	—N/a
We, the Citizens!	343	0.13	▼0.1	0	0	0
React, Include, Recycle	334	0.13	▼0.1	0	0	0
Rise Up	252	0.10	▲0.0	0	0	0
People's Monarchist	186	0.07	—N/a	—N/a	0	—N/a
Total valid	172,618	67.61	▲6.7	2	2	0
Blank ballots	1,264	0.50	▼0.1			
Invalid ballots	81,423	31.89	▼6.6			
Total	255,305	100.00				
Registered voters/turnout	948,062	26.93	▲1.9			

=== Outside Europe ===
Summary of the 18 May 2025 Assembly of the Republic elections results in Outside Europe
Parties	Votes	%	±pp swing	MPs		
Parties	Votes	%	±pp swing	2024	2025	±
Chega	20,202	20.78	▲2.5	1	1	0
AD – PSD/CDS Coalition (PSD/CDS–PP)	19,054	19.60	▼3.3	1	1	0
Socialist	13,119	13.50	▼1.1	0	0	0
Liberal Initiative	2,063	2.12	▲0.2	0	0	0
People–Animals–Nature	2,018	2.08	▼0.3	0	0	0
Left Bloc	1,756	1.81	▼0.1	0	0	0
New Right	1,484	1.53	▲0.1	0	0	0
National Democratic Alternative	1,479	1.52	▲0.4	0	0	0
LIVRE	996	1.02	▲0.3	0	0	0
Unitary Democratic Coalition	585	0.60	▼0.2	0	0	0
Liberal Social	544	0.56	—N/a	—N/a	0	—N/a
Volt Portugal	313	0.32	▲0.0	0	0	0
Portuguese Workers' Communist	299	0.31	—N/a	—N/a	0	—N/a
Together for the People	234	0.24	▲0.0	0	0	0
We, the Citizens!	198	0.20	▼0.1	0	0	0
People's Monarchist	168	0.17	—N/a	—N/a	0	—N/a
React, Include, Recycle	161	0.17	▼0.0	0	0	0
Rise Up	131	0.13	▲0.0	0	0	0
Total valid	64,804	66.67	▼0.4	2	2	0
Blank ballots	368	0.38	▼0.1			
Invalid ballots	32,026	32.95	▲0.6			
Total	97,198	100.00				
Registered voters/turnout	636,660	15.27	▼0.9			
