= Opinion polling for the 2025 Portuguese legislative election =

In the run up to the 2025 Portuguese legislative election, various organisations carried out opinion polling to gauge voting intention in Portugal. Results of such polls are displayed in this article. The date range for these opinion polls are from the 2024 Portuguese legislative election, held on 10 March, to the 2025 Portuguese legislative election, held on 18 May.

== Nationwide polling ==
=== Graphical summary ===
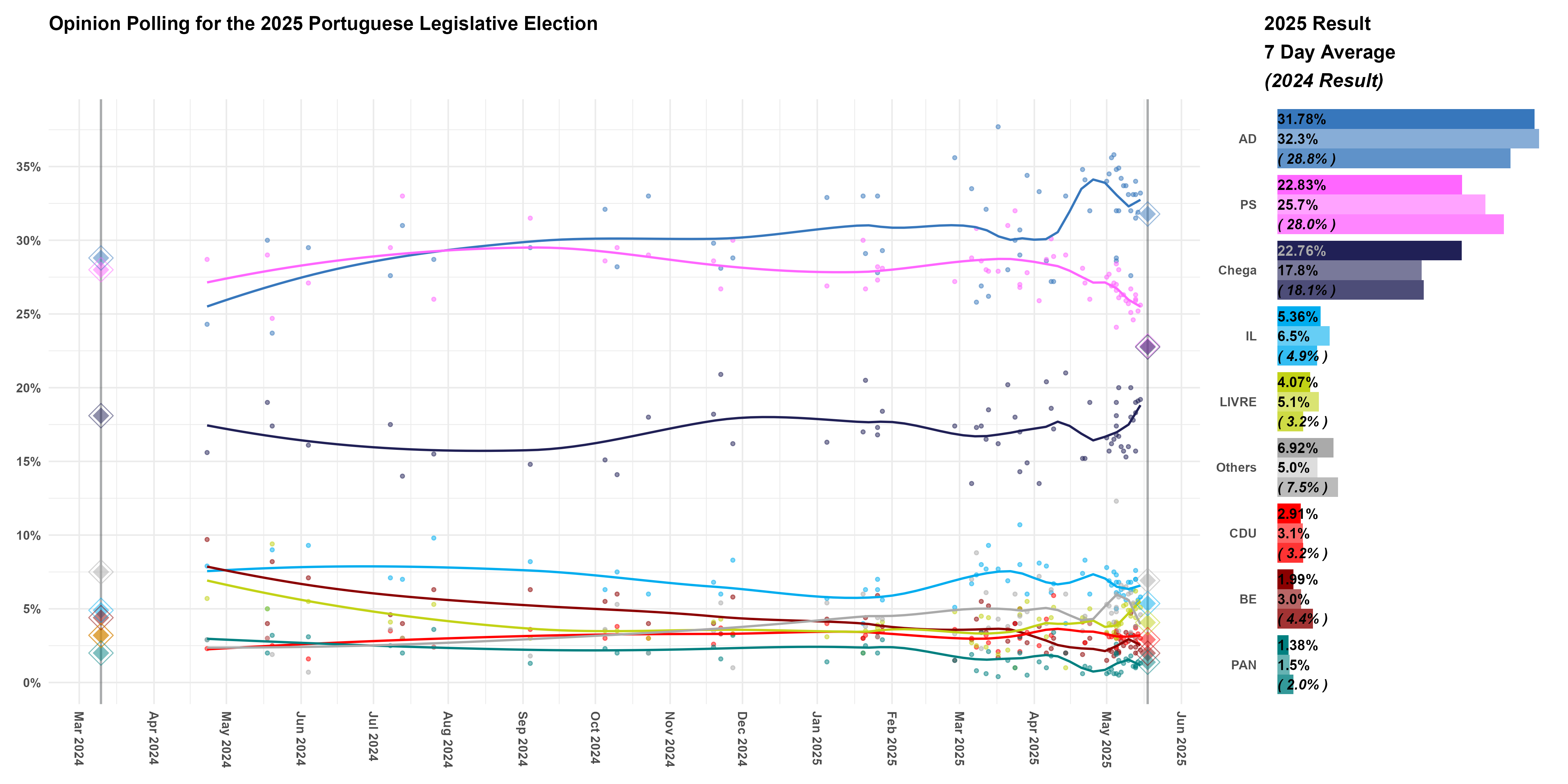
Graph of the polling for the 2025 Portuguese legislative election with 14 day average bar chart.

=== Polling ===
Poll results are listed in the table below in reverse chronological order, showing the most recent first. The highest percentage figure in each polling survey is displayed in bold, and the background shaded in the leading party's colour. In the instance that there is a tie, parties are shaded with their colour. The lead column on the right shows the percentage-point difference between the two parties with the highest figures. Poll results use the date the survey's fieldwork was done, as opposed to the date of publication.

Polls that show their results without distributing those respondents who are undecided or said they would abstain from voting, are re-calculated by removing these numbers from the totals through a simple rule of three, in order to obtain results comparable to other polls and the official election results.

Exit poll

Polling firm/Link	Fieldwork date	Sample size	Turnout	AD	PS	CH	IL	BE	CDU	L	PAN	O	Lead
**2025 legislative election**	18 May 2025	—N/a	58.3	**31.8**; 91	22.8; 58	22.8; 60	5.4; 9	2.0; 1	2.9; 3	4.1; 6	1.4; 1	6.8; 1	**9.0**
CESOP–UCP	18 May 2025	39,103	58–64	**29–34**; 85/96	21–26; 52/63	20–24; 50/61	4–7; 6/12	1–3; 1/3	2–4; 2/4	3–6; 4/10	1–2; 0/1	– 0/1	8
ICS/ISCTE–GfK/Metris	18 May 2025	22,056	60.3– 65.3	**30.3–** **34.7**; 82/94	21.6– 25.8; 56/66	19.9– 24.1; 55/65	4.2– 7.4; 6/12	1.0– 3.6; 1/4	1.4– 4.0; 1/4	3.3– 6.5; 4/10	0.5– 2.5; 0/2	– 0/1	8.7– 8.9
Pitagórica	18 May 2025	24,792	52.3– 58.5	**29.1–** **35.1**; 80/100	19.4– 25.4; 50/70	19.5– 25.5; 50/70	5.0– 8.0; 6/14	1.1– 4.1; 1/5	1.3– 4.3; 1/5	3.2– 6.2; 4/10	0.5– 2.5; 0/2	– 0	9.6
Intercampus	18 May 2025	23,365	54.3– 59.3	**30.9–** **36.9**; 87/99	19.4– 25.4; 52/62	20.6– 26.6; 57/67	3.3– 7.3; 5/11	0.5– 3.5; 0/3	1.4– 4.4; 1/5	1.9– 5.4; 2/8	0.3– 2.3; 0/2	– 0/2	10.3
Pitagórica (Note: Tracking Poll)	12–15 May 2025	810	?	**33.2**; 76/97	25.6; 61/82	19.2; 33/53	5.8; 11/17	2.2; 1/4	3.0; 2/5	5.1; 5/11	1.3; 0/2	4.6; 0	7.6
Pitagórica	11–14 May 2025	810	?	**31.9**	25.2	19.1	5.6	2.6	3.3	5.5	1.4	5.4	6.7
Pitagórica	10–13 May 2025	810	?	**31.5**	26.3	18.3	7.0	2.4	3.7	4.4	1.1	5.3	5.2
CESOP–UCP	6–13 May 2025	1,741	?	**34**; 84/95	26; 62/72	19; 43/50	7; 7/13	2; 1/4	3; 2/5	5; 4/8	1; 0/1	3 (Note: Together for the People (JPP) between 0 and 1 seats.); 0/1	8
Consulmark2	6–13 May 2025	589	?	**33.1**	25.9	15.7	7.6	3.8	2.8	6.2	1.1	3.8	7.2
Pitagórica	9–12 May 2025	810	?	**33.1**	24.6	17.8	6.3	3.2	3.2	5.3	1.1	5.4	8.5
Pitagórica	8–11 May 2025	810	?	**32.0**	25.1	18.0	6.8	2.4	3.3	4.5	1.8	6.1	6.9
Aximage	6–11 May 2025	426	70.3	**27.6**	26.7	20.0	6.3	4.7	3.2	4.9	3.2	3.4	0.9
Pitagórica	7–10 May 2025	810	?	**33.1**	25.7	16.0	6.8	2.8	3.2	4.9	1.5	6.0	7.4
Pitagórica	6–9 May 2025	810	?	**33.7**	25.9	15.3	5.6	3.4	2.7	5.3	1.6	6.5	7.8
Pitagórica	5–8 May 2025	810	?	**33.7**	26.3	15.7	5.9	2.5	3.0	5.2	1.3	6.4	7.4
Pitagórica	4–7 May 2025	810	?	**34.2**	26.3	16.0	6.3	2.8	3.1	4.0	0.7	6.6	7.9
Pitagórica	3–6 May 2025	810	?	**34.9**	26.1	16.7	6.8	2.1	3.2	3.9	0.5	5.8	8.8
CESOP–UCP	28 Apr–6 May 2025	1,464	?	**32**	28	20	6	2	3	4	1.5	3.5 (Note: Together for the People (JPP) between 0.5% and 1%.)	4
Pitagórica	2–5 May 2025	810	?	**34.8**	26.6	16.8	6.8	2.3	3.5	3.8	0.6	4.8	8.2
Aximage	1–5 May 2025	654	?	**28.6**	28.4	18.1	7.3	3.4	2.4	4.1	2.6	5.1	0.2
ICS/ISCTE	25 Apr–5 May 2025	1,002	?	**32**	27	19	5	2	4	3	2	6	5
Intercampus (Note: Results presented here exclude undecideds (4.2%). With their inclusion results are: AD: 27.6%; PS: 23.1%; CH: 16.7%; IL: 5.8%; BE: 3.2%; Livre: 3.0%; CDU: 2.9%; PAN: 1.8%; Others/Invalid: 11.8%.)	24 Apr–5 May 2025	1,055	?	**28.8**	24.1	17.4	6.1	3.3	3.0	3.1	1.9	12.3	4.7
Pitagórica	1–4 May 2025	810	?	**35.8**	27.1	16.5	7.5	1.8	3.2	3.4	0.6	4.1	8.7
Pitagórica	30 Apr–3 May 2025	810	?	**35.6**	26.9	16.2	6.6	2.1	3.1	3.9	0.9	4.7	8.7
Pitagórica	29 Apr–2 May 2025	810	?	**34.5**	27.7	15.7	6.9	2.2	3.1	4.0	0.7	5.2	6.8
Pitagórica	28 Apr–1 May 2025	810	?	**34.0**	27.5	16.6	7.8	1.5	3.3	3.4	0.6	5.3	6.5
CESOP–UCP	21–24 Apr 2025	1,215	?	**32**	26	19	6	3	4	5	1	4	6
Consulmark2	14–22 Apr 2025	569	?	**34.1**	27.1	15.2	8.3	2.7	2.7	4.3	1.1	4.5	7.0
Pitagórica	14–21 Apr 2025	1,000	?	**34.8**	28.1	15.2	7.4	1.9	4.1	4.4	0.6	3.5	6.7
ICS/ISCTE	5–14 Apr 2025	803	?	**33**	29	21	4	2	2	1	2	6	4
Intercampus (Note: Results presented here exclude undecideds (15.4%). With their inclusion results are: PS: 24.4%; AD: 23.0%; CH: 14.5%; IL: 5.7%; CDU: 5.0%; Livre: 4.3%; PAN: 2.9%; BE: 2.5%; Others/Invalid: 2.2%.)	4–9 Apr 2025	607	?	27.2	**28.9**	17.2	6.7	3.0	5.9	5.1	3.4	2.6	1.7
Aximage	4–8 Apr 2025	667	59.4	27.2	**30.1**	18.6	6.1	2.3	3.2	4.4	1.8	6.3	2.9
Aximage	1–6 Apr 2025	400	72.0	28.6	**28.7**	20.4	7.9	2.0	4.3	3.1	1.0	4.0	0.1
Consulmark2	27 Mar–3 Apr 2025	583	?	**33.3**	25.9	13.5	8.1	3.8	2.5	4.3	1.4	7.2	7.4
Pitagórica	24–29 Mar 2025	1,000	?	**34.4**	27.8	14.9	6.0	2.7	3.4	5.5	0.5	4.8 (Note: ADN: 0.7%.)	6.6
Intercampus (Note: Results presented here exclude undecideds (13.9%). With their inclusion results are: AD: 26.5%; PS: 23.1%; CH: 12.3%; IL: 9.2%; Livre: 4.0%; BE: 2.7%; PAN: 2.7%; CDU: 1.8%; Others/Invalid: 3.9%.)	20–26 Mar 2025	605	?	**30.7**	26.8	14.3	10.7	3.1	2.1	4.6	3.1	4.5	3.9
CESOP–UCP	17–26 Mar 2025	1,206	?	**29**	27	17	8	5	3	5	2	4	2
Metris	15–24 Mar 2025	1,022	?	30	**32**	18	4	4	4	1	1	6	2
Aximage	17–21 Mar 2025	1,343	72.0	28.0	**31.0**	20.2	6.9	2.8	3.6	2.2	1.5	3.8	3.0
ICS/ISCTE (Note: Results presented here exclude undecideds (38.8%) and those who would not vote (8.2%). With their inclusion results are: AD: 20.0%; PS: 14.8%; CH: 8.6%; IL: 4.1%; CDU: 1.1%; Livre: 1.0%; BE: 0.9%; PAN: 0.2%; Others/Invalid: 2.3%.)	12–17 Mar 2025	802	?	**37.7**	27.9	16.2	7.7	1.7	2.1	1.9	0.4	4.3	9.8
Intercampus (Note: Results presented here exclude undecideds (11.3%). With their inclusion results are: PS: 24.7%; AD: 23.2%; CH: 16.4%; IL: 8.2%; BE: 4.6%; Livre: 3.9%; CDU: 2.4%; PAN: 1.9%; Others/Invalid: 3.3%.)	11–13 Mar 2025	600	?	26.2	**27.9**	18.5	9.3	5.2	2.7	4.4	2.1	3.7	1.7
Consulmark2	6–12 Mar 2025	594	?	**32.1**	28.0	16.5	7.7	3.4	3.2	2.4	0.6	6.1	4.1
Intercampus (Note: Results presented here exclude undecideds (12.7%). With their inclusion results are: PS: 25.0%; AD: 23.5%; CH: 15.2%; IL: 7.0%; BE: 4.8%; Livre: 3.9%; CDU: 3.0%; PAN: 3.0%; Others/Invalid: 2.0%.)	4–10 Mar 2025	620	?	26.9	**28.6**	17.4	8.0	5.5	3.4	4.5	3.4	2.3	1.7
Aximage	6–8 Mar 2025	601	78.7	25.8	**30.8**	17.3	7.3	4.3	2.4	2.5	0.8	8.8	5.0
Pitagórica	3–6 Mar 2025	625	?	**33.5**	28.8	13.5	6.7	2.9	3.0	2.7	1.9	7.0 (Note: ADN: 0.4%.)	4.7
Pitagórica	23–27 Feb 2025	400	?	**35.6**	27.2	17.4	5.1	1.5	3.6	4.8	1.5	3.3	8.4
Aximage	23–28 Jan 2025	800	78.6	**29.3**	28.1	18.4	5.6	3.8	3.5	4.1	2.9	4.3	1.2
Pitagórica	21–26 Jan 2025	400	?	**33.0**	27.3	16.8	6.3	3.1	3.4	3.7	2.0	4.4 (Note: ADN: 0.6%.)	5.7
Intercampus (Note: Results presented here exclude undecideds (12.3%). With their inclusion results are: PS: 24.7%; AD: 24.4%; CH: 15.2%; IL: 6.1%; BE: 5.2%; Livre: 3.4%; CDU: 3.0%; PAN: 3.0%; Others/Invalid: 2.7%.)	21–26 Jan 2025	638	?	27.8	**28.2**	17.3	7.0	5.9	3.4	3.9	3.4	3.1	0.4
Aximage (Note: Results presented here exclude undecideds (7.5%). With their inclusion results are: AD: 26.9%; PS: 24.7%; CH: 19.0%; IL: 5.8%; BE: 4.1%; Livre: 3.2%; CDU: 3.0%; PAN: 2.3%; Others/Invalid: 3.5%.)	16–21 Jan 2025	802	68.0	**29.1**	26.7	20.5	6.3	4.4	3.2	3.5	2.5	3.8	2.4
ICS/ISCTE	9–20 Jan 2025	805	?	**33**	30	17	4	3	3	2	2	6	3
Pitagórica	28 Dec 2024–5 Jan 2025	400	?	**32.9**	26.9	16.3	5.7	4.3	4.0	3.1	1.4	5.4 (Note: ADN: 1.1%.)	6.0
Intercampus (Note: Results presented here exclude undecideds (9.8%). With their inclusion results are: PS: 27.1%; AD: 26.0%; CH: 14.6%; IL: 7.5%; BE: 5.2%; CDU: 3.0%; Livre: 3.0%; PAN: 2.9%; Others/Invalid: 0.9%.)	21–27 Nov 2024	605	?	28.8	**30.0**	16.2	8.3	5.8	3.3	3.3	3.2	1.0	1.2
Aximage (Note: Results presented here exclude undecideds (6.9%). With their inclusion results are: AD: 26.2%; PS: 24.9%; CH: 19.5%; IL: 5.6%; Livre: 4.0%; CDU: 3.4%; BE: 3.1%; PAN: 1.5%; Others/Invalid: 5.0%.)	15–22 Nov 2024	800	71.0	**28.1**	26.7	20.9	6.0	3.3	3.7	4.3	1.6	5.4	1.4
Aximage	13–19 Nov 2024	802	78.1	**29.8**	28.6	18.2	6.8	4.0	2.6	4.1	2.4	3.5	1.2
CESOP–UCP	17–23 Oct 2024	1,025	?	**33**	29	18	6	4	3	3	2	2	4
Intercampus (Note: Results presented here exclude undecideds (13.6%). With their inclusion results are: PS: 25.5%; AD: 24.3%; CH: 12.2%; IL: 6.5%; BE: 5.2%; CDU: 3.3%; Livre: 3.0%; PAN: 1.7%; Others/Invalid: 4.6%.)	4–10 Oct 2024	612	?	28.2	**29.5**	14.1	7.5	6.0	3.8	3.5	2.0	5.3	1.3
Aximage	30 Sep–5 Oct 2024	802	68.0	**32.1**	28.6	15.1	6.3	5.5	3.0	3.5	2.3	3.6	3.5
Intercampus (Note: Results presented here exclude undecideds (9.9%). With their inclusion results are: PS: 28.4%; AD: 26.6%; CH: 13.3%; IL: 7.4%; BE: 5.7%; CDU: 3.2%; Livre: 2.7%; PAN: 1.2%; Others/Invalid: 1.6%.)	29 Aug–4 Sep 2024	604	?	29.5	**31.5**	14.8	8.2	6.3	3.6	3.0	1.3	1.8	2.0
Intercampus (Note: Results presented here exclude undecideds (8.1%). With their inclusion results are: AD: 26.4%; PS: 23.9%; CH: 14.3%; IL: 9.0%; BE: 5.8%; Livre: 4.9%; PAN: 3.3%; CDU: 2.2%; Others/Invalid: 2.2%.)	19–26 Jul 2024	609	?	**28.7**	26.0	15.5	9.8	6.3	2.4	5.3	3.6	2.4	2.7
CESOP–UCP	7–13 Jul 2024	957	?	31	**33**	14	7	4	3	3	2	3	2
Aximage	3–8 Jul 2024	801	74.9	27.6	**29.5**	17.5	7.1	4.6	3.5	4.1	2.5	3.6	1.9
**2024 EP elections**	9 Jun 2024	—N/a	36.6	31.1 (89)	**32.1** (87)	9.8 (19)	9.1 (20)	4.3 (5)	4.1 (5)	3.8 (5)	1.2 (0)	4.5 (0)	**1.0**
Intercampus (Note: Results presented here exclude undecideds (9.2%). With their inclusion results are: AD: 26.8%; PS: 24.6%; CH: 14.6%; IL: 8.5%; BE: 6.5%; Livre: 5.0%; PAN: 2.8%; CDU: 1.6%; Others/Invalid: 0.6%.)	29 May–4 Jun 2024	604	?	**29.5**	27.1	16.1	9.3	7.1	1.6	5.5	3.1	0.7	2.4
Intercampus (Note: Results presented here exclude undecideds (6.3%). With their inclusion results are: PS: 23.1%; AD: 22.2%; CH: 16.3%; Livre: 8.8%; IL: 8.4%; BE: 7.7%; PAN: 3.0%; CDU: 2.3%; Others/Invalid: 1.8%.)	12–20 May 2024	609	?	23.7	**24.7**	17.4	9.0	8.2	2.5	9.4	3.2	1.9	1.0
CESOP–UCP	13–18 May 2024	965	?	**30**	29	19	5	4	3	5	2	3	1
Intercampus (Note: Results presented here exclude undecideds (7.4%). With their inclusion results are: PS: 26.6%; AD: 22.5%; CH: 14.4%; BE: 9.0%; IL: 7.3%; Livre: 5.3%; PAN: 2.7%; CDU: 2.1%; Others/Invalid: 2.7%.)	18–23 Apr 2024	605	?	24.3	**28.7**	15.6	7.9	9.7	2.3	5.7	2.9	2.9	4.4
**2024 legislative election**	10 Mar 2024	—N/a	59.9	**28.8**; 80	28.0; 78	18.1; 50	4.9; 8	4.4; 5	3.2; 4	3.2; 4	2.0; 1	7.5; 0	**0.8**

== Constituency polling ==
=== Faro ===
Polling firm/Link	Fieldwork date	Sample size	Turnout	CH	PS	AD	BE	IL	CDU	L	PAN	O	Lead
2025 legislative election	18 May 2025	—N/a	60.1	33.9; 4	20.5; 2	25.7; 3	2.5; 0	4.4; 0	2.7; 0	3.4; 0	1.8; 0	5.1; 0	8.2
Aximage (Note: Results presented here exclude undecideds (13.8%). With their inclusion results are: CH: 24.7%; AD: 23.0%; PS: 22.6%; CDU: 3.9%; IL: 3.6%; BE: 3.1%; Livre: 1.3%; PAN: 0.3%; Others/Invalid: 3.7%.)	6–8 Apr 2025	300	?	28.7; 3	26.2; 3	26.7; 3	3.6; 0	4.3; 0	4.5; 0	1.5; 0	0.3; 0	4.3; 0	2.0
2024 EP elections	9 Jun 2024	—N/a	42.2	14.3 (1)	29.5 (4)	28.2 (3)	5.1 (0)	9.3 (1)	4.1 (0)	3.7 (0)	1.5 (0)	4.3 (0)	1.3
2024 legislative election	10 Mar 2024	—N/a	61.7	27.2; 3	25.5; 3	22.4; 3	5.8; 0	4.6; 0	3.2; 0	2.8; 0	2.6; 0	5.9; 0	1.7

=== Santarém ===
Polling firm/Link	Fieldwork date	Sample size	Turnout	PS	AD	CH	BE	CDU	IL	L	PAN	O	Lead
2025 legislative election	18 May 2025	—N/a	64.7	22.8; 2	30.6; 4	28.1; 3	1.8; 0	3.6; 0	3.9; 0	3.2; 0	1.1; 0	4.9; 0	2.5
Aximage	16–20 Apr 2025	305	?	26.3; 3	26.4; 3	28.0; 3	4.2; 0	4.4; 0	3.3; 0	4.3; 0	1.7; 0	1.4; 0	1.6
2024 EP elections	9 Jun 2024	—N/a	44.7	32.2 (4)	30.0 (3)	12.5 (1)	3.8 (0)	4.5 (0)	7.9 (1)	3.1 (0)	1.0 (0)	5.0 (0)	2.2
2024 legislative election	10 Mar 2024	—N/a	66.5	27.8; 3	27.3; 3	23.3; 3	4.5; 0	4.1; 0	3.8; 0	2.5; 0	1.6; 0	5.1; 0	0.5

=== Setúbal ===
Polling firm/Link	Fieldwork date	Sample size	Turnout	PS	CH	AD	CDU	BE	IL	L	PAN	O	Lead
2025 legislative election	18 May 2025	—N/a	65.1	25.0; 5	26.4; 6	21.0; 5	7.1; 1	2.7; 0	5.5; 1	5.8; 1	1.9; 0	4.6; 0	1.4
Aximage	17–27 Mar 2025	446	?	32.8; 7	24.1; 5	21.1; 4	5.3; 1	2.6; 0	5.3; 1	4.4; 1	2.1; 0	2.3; 0	8.7
2024 EP elections	9 Jun 2024	—N/a	42.2	34.2 (7)	11.9 (2)	19.9 (4)	9.6 (2)	5.6 (1)	9.1 (2)	4.5 (1)	1.5 (0)	3.8 (0)	14.3
2024 legislative election	10 Mar 2024	—N/a	66.9	31.3; 7	20.3; 4	17.2; 4	7.7; 1	6.0; 1	5.4; 1	4.3; 1	2.6; 0	5.2; 0	11.0

== Leadership polls ==
=== Preferred prime minister ===
Poll results showing public opinion on who would make the best prime minister or who is better positioned to win are shown in the table below in reverse chronological order, showing the most recent first.

Polling firm/Link	Fieldwork date	Luís Montenegro	Pedro Nuno Santos	André Ventura	N	Both/ O	NO	Lead
CESOP–UCP	6–13 May 2025	49	28	—N/a	—N/a	—N/a	23	21
Consulmark2	6–13 May 2025	44.1	26.7	14.6	10.7	—N/a	3.9	17.4
CESOP–UCP	28 Apr–6 May 2025	47	28	—N/a	—N/a	—N/a	25	19
Intercampus	24 Apr–5 May 2025	41.2	28.1	—N/a	15.1	—N/a	15.6	13.1
CESOP–UCP	21–24 Apr 2025	47	29	—N/a	—N/a	—N/a	24	18
Consulmark2	14–22 Apr 2025	43.9	25.1	12.5	14.6	—N/a	3.9	18.8
Intercampus	4–9 Apr 2025	46.5	37.9	—N/a	5.9	—N/a	9.7	8.6
Aximage	4–8 Apr 2025	36	27	—N/a	22	5	10	9
Consulmark2	27 Mar–3 Apr 2025	42.7	30.4	8.4	13.4	—N/a	5.1	12.3
Intercampus	20–26 Mar 2025	48.8	31.9	—N/a	0.2	—N/a	19.2	16.9
CESOP–UCP (Note: Question: Which of the two is best prepared to serve as prime minister?)	17–26 Mar 2025	46	31	—N/a	17	—N/a	6	15
Consulmark2	6–12 Mar 2025	41.9	27.4	11.6	14.5	—N/a	4.5	14.5
Aximage	6–8 Mar 2025	34	28	—N/a	25	8	5	6
Aximage	23–28 Jan 2025	40	27	—N/a	18	9	7	13
Aximage	13–19 Nov 2024	40	28	—N/a	18	8	6	12
Aximage	13–19 Nov 2024	40	28	—N/a	18	8	6	12
Aximage	30 Sep–5 Oct 2024	45	28	—N/a	16	7	4	17
Intercampus (Note: Question: Who do you think has more competency to be the prime minister of Portugal, the current prime minister Luís Montenegro or Pedro Nuno Santos?)	29 Aug–4 Sep 2024	45.9	31.8	—N/a	—N/a	—N/a	22.3	14.1
Aximage	3–8 Jul 2024	37	28	—N/a	16	11	8	9
Aximage	17–22 May 2024	40	28	—N/a	18	9	5	12

=== Party leaders' approval/disapproval ratings ===
Poll results showing public opinion on the performance of the leaders of all parties in parliament are shown in the table below in reverse chronological order, showing the most recent first.

Polling firm/Link	Fieldwork date	Luís Montenegro			Nuno Melo			Pedro Nuno Santos			André Ventura			Rui Rocha			Mariana Mortágua			Paulo Raimundo			Rui Tavares			Inês Sousa Real		
Polling firm/Link	Fieldwork date	Pos.	Neg.	Net	Pos.	Neg.	Net	Pos.	Neg.	Net	Pos.	Neg.	Net	Pos.	Neg.	Net	Pos.	Neg.	Net	Pos.	Neg.	Net	Pos.	Neg.	Net	Pos.	Neg.	Net
Intercampus	24 Apr–5 May 2025	35.0	34.6	+0.4	12.8	47.5	–34.7	30.4	35.1	–4.7	18.8	54.1	–35.3	17.2	32.6	–15.4	12.3	47.0	–34.7	9.8	53.7	–43.7	15.6	33.8	–18.2	13.7	36.0	–22.3
Pitagórica	14–21 Apr 2025	51	44	+7	—N/a	—N/a	—N/a	32	64	–32	18	80	–62	—N/a	—N/a	—N/a	—N/a	—N/a	—N/a	—N/a	—N/a	—N/a	—N/a	—N/a	—N/a	—N/a	—N/a	—N/a
Intercampus	4–9 Apr 2025	26.7	47.9	–21.2	12.0	45.8	–33.8	24.1	48.1	–24.0	17.8	66.8	–49.0	25.7	32.0	–6.3	12.0	54.4	–42.4	9.8	58.1	–48.3	23.7	31.8	–8.1	12.8	47.8	–35.0
Aximage	4–8 Apr 2025	39	53	–14	31	44	–13	32	55	–23	28	64	–36	45	29	+16	32	53	–21	22	56	–34	37	35	+2	27	41	–14
Pitagórica	24–29 Mar 2025	50	44	+6	—N/a	—N/a	—N/a	28	66	–38	18	80	–62	—N/a	—N/a	—N/a	—N/a	—N/a	—N/a	—N/a	—N/a	—N/a	—N/a	—N/a	—N/a	—N/a	—N/a	—N/a
Intercampus	20–26 Mar 2025	27.6	39.8	–12.2	11.4	45.5	–34.1	21.0	48.9	–27.9	14.7	70.1	–21.2	30.6	29.6	+1.0	9.9	59.5	–49.6	8.2	56.9	–48.7	24.3	32.6	–8.3	13.4	42.2	–28.8
Intercampus	4–10 Mar 2025	29.9	42.7	–12.8	11.6	43.3	–31.7	24.4	46.2	–21.8	21.8	60.7	–38.9	25.8	25.8	0	16.5	54.4	–37.9	8.1	52.4	–44.3	23.7	31.8	–8.1	14.7	38.8	–24.1
Pitagórica	3–6 Mar 2025	47	46	+1	—N/a	—N/a	—N/a	35	57	–22	19	77	–58	—N/a	—N/a	—N/a	—N/a	—N/a	—N/a	—N/a	—N/a	—N/a	—N/a	—N/a	—N/a	—N/a	—N/a	—N/a
Pitagórica	23–27 Feb 2025	52	38	+14	—N/a	—N/a	—N/a	35	56	–21	22	75	–53	—N/a	—N/a	—N/a	—N/a	—N/a	—N/a	—N/a	—N/a	—N/a	—N/a	—N/a	—N/a	—N/a	—N/a	—N/a
Aximage	23–28 Jan 2025	50	39	+11	31	46	–15	36	52	–16	30	63	–33	35	40	–5	28	58	–30	23	55	–32	35	39	–4	32	42	–10
Pitagórica	21–26 Jan 2025	54	36	+18	—N/a	—N/a	—N/a	28	63	–35	25	70	–45	—N/a	—N/a	—N/a	—N/a	—N/a	—N/a	—N/a	—N/a	—N/a	—N/a	—N/a	—N/a	—N/a	—N/a	—N/a
Intercampus	21–26 Jan 2025	32.9	32.0	+0.9	9.5	48.4	–38.9	24.1	42.0	–17.9	20.4	63.5	–43.1	18.2	35.1	–16.9	15.5	52.8	–37.8	7.0	55.0	–48.0	19.0	37.3	–18.3	14.1	44.3	–30.2
Aximage	16–21 Jan 2025	51	37	+14	30	43	–13	37	46	–9	35	55	–20	32	38	–6	—N/a	—N/a	—N/a	—N/a	—N/a	—N/a	—N/a	—N/a	—N/a	—N/a	—N/a	—N/a
Intercampus	21–27 Nov 2024	37.0	31.6	+5.4	12.6	43.8	–31.2	27.4	41.2	–13.8	22.4	60.9	–38.5	23.5	31.4	–7.9	19.2	50.5	–31.3	7.6	55.9	–48.3	24.2	30.8	—6.5	15.3	40.7	–25.4
Aximage	15–22 Nov 2024	52	37	+15	29	45	–16	39	50	–11	32	59	–27	33	39	–6	—N/a	—N/a	—N/a	—N/a	—N/a	—N/a	—N/a	—N/a	—N/a	—N/a	—N/a	—N/a
Aximage	13–19 Nov 2024	53	39	+14	29	50	–21	39	51	–12	28	65	–37	35	42	–7	32	54	–22	20	55	–35	38	37	+1	30	45	–15
Intercampus	4–10 Oct 2024	36.6	27.6	+9.0	9.3	48.0	–38.7	30.7	33.3	–2.6	18.6	63.9	–45.3	21.2	31.2	–10.0	18.6	44.1	–25.5	5.7	51.3	–45.6	21.9	27.0	–5.1	13.0	40.1	–27.1
Aximage	30 Sep–5 Oct 2024	60	31	+29	28	50	–22	42	49	–7	30	64	–34	42	35	+7	34	52	–18	20	56	–36	39	35	+4	29	47	–18
Intercampus	29 Aug–4 Sep 2024	44.9	22.7	+22.2	11.0	44.0	–33.0	38.4	32.1	+6.3	21.3	61.7	–40.4	24.5	30.5	–6.0	21.9	40.6	–18.7	7.8	57.1	–49.3	19.5	31.8	–12.3	15.1	38.2	–23.1
Intercampus	19–26 Jul 2024	43.6	26.3	+17.3	13.8	37.2	–23.4	25.5	39.9	–14.4	19.9	62.2	–42.3	27.4	31.1	—3.7	22.5	41.3	–18.8	8.2	52.9	–44.7	24.6	31.9	–7.3	17.0	35.0	–18.0
Aximage	3–8 Jul 2024	58	29	+29	35	40	–5	43	42	+1	31	62	–31	44	30	+14	38	45	–7	25	51	–26	39	35	+4	33	42	–9
Intercampus	29 May–4 Jun 2024	38.1	29.4	+8.7	14.2	41.4	–27.2	28.7	38.1	–9.4	23.5	58.6	–35.5	26.6	26.6	0	25.3	41.6	–16.3	11.9	48.9	–37.0	27.1	28.8	–1.7	18.7	31.5	–12.8
Intercampus	12–20 May 2024	27.2	27.7	–0.5	10.7	43.9	–33.2	30.2	36.5	–6.3	24.5	55.2	–30.7	28.1	24.9	+3.2	27.6	37.4	–9.8	12.0	45.7	–33.7	32.7	20.8	+11.9	18.8	29.7	–10.9
Intercampus	18–23 Apr 2024	33.1	33.7	–0.6	11.0	40.6	–29.6	28.4	41.4	–13.0	20.3	62.2	–41.9	27.8	29.7	–1.9	28.4	42.1	–13.7	11.4	49.5	–38.1	29.3	25.5	+3.8	18.8	31.7	–12.9

=== Party leaders' ratings ===
Poll results showing the public opinion on all political party leaders rated from 0 to 10 (Note: Intercampus polls rate party leaders from 1 to 5. CESOP–UCP poll rates party leaders from 0 to 20. The results are adapted to match the ICS/ISCTE polls.) (with the former being strong disapproval and the latter strong approval) are shown in the table below in reverse chronological order (showing the most recent first).

Polling firm/Link	Fieldwork date	Luís Montenegro	Nuno Melo	Pedro Nuno Santos	André Ventura	Rui Rocha	Mariana Mortágua	Paulo Raimundo	Rui Tavares	Inês Sousa Real	Lead
Intercampus	24 Apr–5 May 2025	6.2	5.0	5.8	4.8	5.4	4.8	4.6	5.4	5.0	0.4
ICS/ISCTE	5–14 Apr 2025	5.3	4.0	4.9	3.4	4.2	3.6	3.3	4.3	3.6	0.4
Intercampus	4–9 Apr 2025	5.4	5.0	5.2	4.2	5.8	4.6	4.4	5.6	5.0	0.2
Intercampus	20–26 Mar 2025	5.6	5.0	5.2	4.0	5.8	4.4	4.4	5.6	5.0	0.2
CESOP–UCP	17–26 Mar 2025	5.4	3.9	4.8	3.1	4.3	3.4	3.2	4.0	3.4	0.6
Intercampus	4–10 Mar 2025	5.4	5.0	5.4	4.6	6.0	4.8	4.6	5.6	5.2	0.4
Intercampus	21–26 Jan 2025	6.0	4.8	5.4	4.4	5.4	4.8	4.4	5.4	5.0	0.6
ICS/ISCTE	9–20 Jan 2025	5.1	3.8	4.7	3.5	3.7	3.6	3.2	3.9	3.4	0.4
Intercampus	21–27 Nov 2024	6.2	5.0	5.6	4.4	5.8	4.8	4.6	5.8	5.2	0.4
CESOP–UCP	17–23 Oct 2024	6.0	—N/a	5.2	3.5	4.6	3.9	3.5	4.5	3.8	0.8
Intercampus	4–10 Oct 2024	6.2	4.8	5.8	4.4	5.6	5.2	4.6	5.8	5.2	0.4
Intercampus	29 Aug–4 Sep 2024	6.6	5.0	6.2	4.6	5.8	5.4	4.6	5.6	5.2	0.4
Intercampus	19–26 Jul 2024	6.4	5.2	5.6	4.4	5.8	5.2	4.6	5.8	5.4	0.6
CESOP–UCP	7–13 Jul 2024	5.7	—N/a	4.8	3.3	4.5	4.2	3.5	4.4	3.7	0.9
Intercampus	29 May–4 Jun 2024	6.2	5.2	5.6	4.6	6.0	5.4	4.8	6.0	5.6	0.2
Intercampus	12–20 May 2024	6.0	5.0	5.8	4.8	6.0	5.6	4.8	6.4	5.6	0.4
CESOP–UCP	13–18 May 2024	5.7	—N/a	4.9	3.5	4.6	4.4	4.0	4.9	4.0	0.8
Intercampus	18–23 Apr 2024	5.8	5.0	5.6	4.4	5.8	5.4	4.8	6.0	5.6	0.2

=== Cabinet approval/disapproval ratings ===
Poll results showing public opinion on the performance of the Government are shown in the table below in reverse chronological order, showing the most recent first.

Polling firm/Link	Fieldwork date	Sample size	Luís Montenegro's cabinet				
Polling firm/Link	Fieldwork date	Sample size	Approve	Disapprove	Neither	No opinion	Lead
Aximage	1–5 May 2025	654	38	55	—N/a	7	17
ICS/ISCTE	25 Apr–5 May 2025	1,002	38	51	—N/a	11	13
Pitagórica	14–21 Apr 2025	1,000	57	39	—N/a	4	18
ICS/ISCTE	5–14 Apr 2025	803	33	61	—N/a	6	28
Aximage	4–8 Apr 2025	667	36	54	—N/a	10	18
Pitagórica	24–29 Mar 2025	1,000	59	37	—N/a	4	22
Intercampus	20–26 Mar 2025	605	35.1	29.2	33.4	2.3	1.7
CESOP–UCP	17–26 Mar 2025	1,206	22	24	52	2	28
ICS/ISCTE	12–17 Mar 2025	802	47	43	—N/a	10	4
Intercampus	4–10 Mar 2025	620	25.2	44.2	28.7	1.9	15.5
Aximage	6–8 Mar 2025	601	38	55	—N/a	7	17
Pitagórica	3–6 Mar 2025	625	60	35	—N/a	5	25
Pitagórica	23–27 Feb 2025	400	62	33	—N/a	5	29
Aximage	23–28 Jan 2025	800	45	47	—N/a	8	2
Pitagórica	21–26 Jan 2025	400	62	29	—N/a	9	33
Intercampus	21–26 Jan 2025	638	25.1	36.7	36.8	1.4	0.1
ICS/ISCTE	9–20 Jan 2025	805	41	45	—N/a	14	4
Pitagórica	28 Dec 2024–5 Jan 2025	400	62	32	—N/a	6	30
Intercampus	21–27 Nov 2024	605	30.0	32.9	35.5	1.5	2.6
Aximage	13–19 Nov 2024	802	45	48	—N/a	7	3
CESOP–UCP	17–23 Oct 2024	1,025	22	18	57	3	35
Intercampus	4–10 Oct 2024	612	29.2	35.6	33.8	1.3	1.8
Aximage	30 Sep–5 Oct 2024	802	60	34	—N/a	6	26
Intercampus	29 Aug–4 Sep 2024	604	39.6	23.7	35.3	1.4	4.3
Intercampus	19–26 Jul 2024	609	33.9	26.3	36.3	3.5	2.4
CESOP–UCP	3–7 Jul 2024	957	18	20	57	5	37
Marktest	5–7 Jun 2024	440	46.0	29.6	22.3	2.2	16.4
Intercampus	29 May–4 Jun 2024	604	31.5	31.6	35.3	1.7	3.7
Intercampus	12–20 May 2024	609	19.8	32.2	44.8	3.2	12.6
CESOP–UCP	13–18 May 2024	965	15	24	51	10	27
Marktest	7–15 May 2024	497	37.0	36.2	24.3	2.4	0.8
Intercampus	18–23 Apr 2024	605	21.8	37.8	35.9	4.5	1.9
