= Results breakdown of the 2024 Portuguese legislative election =

2024 Portuguese legislative election
- 10 March 2024
- All 230 seats in the Assembly of the Republic; 116 seats needed for a majority
- Turnout: 59.8%
Party	Leader	Vote %	Seats	+/–
AD (Note: Sum of PSD/CDS/PPM lists in mainland Portugal, Azores and Overseas with PSD/CDS list in Madeira.)	Luís Montenegro	28.8%	80	+3
PS	Pedro Nuno Santos	28.0%	78	−42
CH	André Ventura	18.1%	50	+38
IL	Rui Rocha	4.9%	8	0
BE	Mariana Mortágua	4.4%	5	0
CDU	Paulo Raimundo	3.2%	4	−2
LIVRE	Collective leadership (Note: Rui Tavares, running for Lisbon, was the party's main candidate in this campaign.)	3.2%	4	+3
PAN	Inês Sousa Real	2.0%	1	0
This lists parties that won seats. See the complete results below.
Prime Minister before	Prime Minister after
António Costa; PS	Luís Montenegro; PSD

This is the results breakdown of the Assembly of the Republic election held in Portugal on 10 March 2024. The following tables will show detailed results in each of the country's 22 electoral constituencies.

The elections were won by the center-right Democratic Alliance (AD) led by Luís Montenegro winning 28.8 percent of the votes and 80 seats, with the Socialist Party (PS) finishing in a close second with 28 percent and 78 seats, losing its absolute majority gained in the 2022 election. The election also saw the surge of the right-wing populist Chega party, that won 18.1 percent and 50 seats. Turnout in Portugal alone reached 66.2 percent, the highest rate since 1995, while as a whole it reached 59.8 percent.

== Electoral system ==
The Assembly of the Republic has 230 members elected to four-year terms. The number of seats to be elected by each district depends on the district magnitude. 226 seats are allocated proportionally by the number of registered voters in the 18 Districts in Mainland Portugal, plus Azores and Madeira, and 4 fixed seats are allocated for overseas voters, 2 seats for voters in Europe and another 2 seats for voters Outside Europe. The 230 members of Parliament are elected using the D'Hondt method and by a closed list proportional representation system. Members represent the country as a whole and not the constituencies in which they were elected.

== Summary ==
=== Nationwide results ===
Summary of the 10 March 2024 Assembly of the Republic elections results
Parties	Votes	%	±pp swing	MPs				
Parties	Votes	%	±pp swing	2022	2024	±	%	±
Democratic Alliance (PSD/CDS–PP/PPM) (Note: PSD/CDS/PPM list in mainland Portugal, Azores and Overseas.)	1,814,002	28.01	▼1.8	74	77	▲3	33.48	▲1.3
Madeira First (PSD/CDS–PP) (Note: In Madeira, the PSD and the CDS–PP will contest the elections in a coalition called Madeira First (Madeira Primeiro).)	52,989	0.82	▼0.1	3	3	0	1.30	0.0
People's Monarchist (Note: PPM list only in Madeira)	451	0.01	0.0	0	0	0	0.00	0.0
Total Democratic Alliance (Note: Democratic Alliance results are compared to the combined totals of the Social Democratic Party, the Democratic and Social Centre and the People's Monarchist Party in the 2022 election.)	1,867,442	28.83	▼1.9	77	80	▲3	34.78	▲1.3
Socialist	1,812,443	27.98	▼13.4	120	78	▼42	33.91	▼18.3
Chega	1,169,781	18.06	▲10.9	12	50	▲38	21.74	▲16.5
Liberal Initiative	319,877	4.94	0.0	8	8	0	3.48	0.0
Left Bloc	282,314	4.36	0.0	5	5	0	2.17	0.0
Unitary Democratic Coalition	205,551	3.17	▼1.1	6	4	▼2	1.74	▼0.9
LIVRE	204,875	3.16	▲1.9	1	4	▲3	1.74	▲1.3
People–Animals–Nature	126,125	1.95	▲0.4	1	1	0	0.43	0.0
National Democratic Alternative	102,134	1.58	▲1.4	0	0	0	0.00	0.0
React, Include, Recycle	26,092	0.40	0.0	0	0	0	0.00	0.0
Together for the People	19,145	0.30	▲0.1	0	0	0	0.00	0.0
New Right	16,456	0.25	—N/a	—N/a	0	—N/a	0.00	—N/a
Portuguese Workers' Communist	15,491	0.24	0.0	0	0	0	0.00	0.0
Volt Portugal	11,854	0.18	▲0.1	0	0	0	0.00	0.0
Rise Up	6,030	0.09	0.0	0	0	0	0.00	0.0
Alternative 21 (Earth Party/Alliance)	4,265	0.07	▼0.1	0	0	0	0.00	0.0
Labour	2,435	0.04	▼0.1	0	0	0	0.00	0.0
We, the Citizens!	2,399	0.04	▼0.1	0	0	0	0.00	0.0
Socialist Alternative Movement (Note: List rejected. Votes counted as invalid.)	0	0.00	▼0.1	0	0	0	0.00	0.0
Total valid	6,194,709	95.64	▼1.8	230	230	0	100.00	0.0
Blank ballots	89,847	1.39	▲0.3					
Invalid ballots	192,396	2.97	▲1.5					
Total	6,476,952	100.00						
Registered voters/turnout	10,813,643	59.90	▲8.4					
Source: Comissão Nacional de Eleições

== Results by constituency ==
=== Azores ===
Summary of the 10 March 2024 Assembly of the Republic elections results in Azores
Parties	Votes	%	±pp swing	MPs		
Parties	Votes	%	±pp swing	2022	2024	±
Democratic Alliance (PSD/CDS–PP/PPM)	42,343	39.84	▲5.9	2	2	0
Socialist	31,015	29.18	▼13.7	3	2	▼1
Chega	16,744	15.76	▲9.8	0	1	▲1
Left Bloc	3,622	3.41	▼0.9	0	0	0
Liberal Initiative	2,882	2.71	▼1.4	0	0	0
LIVRE	1,816	1.71	▲0.8	0	0	0
People–Animals–Nature	1,654	1.56	▲0.2	0	0	0
Unitary Democratic Coalition	1,160	1.09	▼0.4	0	0	0
National Democratic Alternative	829	0.78	▲0.2	0	0	0
Together for the People	213	0.20	—N/a	—N/a	0	—N/a
React, Include, Recycle	125	0.12	▼0.1	0	0	0
Volt Portugal	115	0.11	▲0.0	0	0	0
Rise Up	64	0.06	▼0.0	0	0	0
Total valid	102,582	96.54	▲0.2	5	5	0
Blank ballots	2,621	2.47	0.0			
Invalid ballots	1,070	1.01	▼0.1			
Total	106,273	100.00				
Registered voters/turnout	230,082	46.19	▲9.5			

=== Aveiro ===
Summary of the 10 March 2024 Assembly of the Republic elections results in Aveiro
Parties	Votes	%	±pp swing	MPs		
Parties	Votes	%	±pp swing	2022	2024	±
Democratic Alliance (PSD/CDS–PP/PPM)	148,861	35.13	▼3.0	7	7	0
Socialist	117,348	27.69	▼11.8	8	5	▼3
Chega	73,110	17.25	▲11.6	1	3	▲2
Liberal Initiative	21,671	5.11	▲0.6	0	1	▲1
Left Bloc	17,358	4.10	▼0.5	0	0	0
LIVRE	9,510	2.24	▲1.5	0	0	0
People–Animals–Nature	7,300	1.72	▲0.5	0	0	0
Unitary Democratic Coalition	5,850	1.38	▼0.4	0	0	0
National Democratic Alternative	5,753	1.36	▲1.2	0	0	0
React, Include, Recycle	1,933	0.46	▼0.0	0		0
Portuguese Workers' Communist	1,215	0.29	▼0.1	0	0	0
New Right	1,076	0.25	—N/a	—N/a	0	—N/a
Volt Portugal	610	0.14	▲0.0	0	0	0
Rise Up	362	0.09	▲0.0	0	0	0
Alternative 21 (Earth Party/Alliance) (Note: Compared to results of MPT in 2022.)	206	0.05	▼0.1	0	0	0
Total valid	412,163	97.26	▼0.5	16	16	0
Blank ballots	7,031	1.66	▲0.4			
Invalid ballots	4,577	1.08	▲0.1			
Total	423,771	100.00				
Registered voters/turnout	642,185	66.00	▲9.2			

=== Beja ===
Summary of the 10 March 2024 Assembly of the Republic elections results in Beja
Parties	Votes	%	±pp swing	MPs		
Parties	Votes	%	±pp swing	2022	2024	±
Socialist	24,408	31.70	▼12.0	2	1	▼1
Chega	16,595	21.55	▲11.3	0	1	▲1
Democratic Alliance (PSD/CDS–PP/PPM)	12,890	16.74	▲0.0	0	1	▲1
Unitary Democratic Coalition	11,570	15.03	▼3.4	1	0	▼1
Left Bloc	3,393	4.41	▲0.7	0	0	0
Liberal Initiative	1,708	2.22	▲0.2	0	0	0
LIVRE	1,369	1.78	▲1.1	0	0	0
People–Animals–Nature	943	1.22	▲0.3	0	0	0
National Democratic Alternative	861	1.12	—N/a	—N/a	0	—N/a
Portuguese Workers' Communist	624	0.81	▲0.2	0	0	0
React, Include, Recycle	181	0.24	▲0.0	0	0	0
Volt Portugal	147	0.19	▲0.0	0	0	0
New Right	106	0.14	—N/a	—N/a	0	—N/a
Rise Up	95	0.12	0.0	0	0	0
Total valid	74,890	97.27	▼0.8	3	3	0
Blank ballots	1,170	1.52	▲0.4			
Invalid ballots	934	1.21	▲0.4			
Total	76,994	100.00				
Registered voters/turnout	119,102	64.65	▲8.8			

=== Braga ===
Summary of the 10 March 2024 Assembly of the Republic elections results in Braga
Parties	Votes	%	±pp swing	MPs		
Parties	Votes	%	±pp swing	2022	2024	±
Democratic Alliance (PSD/CDS–PP/PPM)	184,468	33.16	▼3.3	8	8	0
Socialist	157,099	28.24	▼13.9	9	6	▼3
Chega	93,826	16.86	▲11.1	1	4	▲3
Liberal Initiative	33,930	6.10	▲1.8	1	1	0
Left Bloc	21,388	3.84	▲0.1	0	0	0
LIVRE	12,926	2.32	▲1.5	0	0	0
Unitary Democratic Coalition	10,136	1.82	▼0.8	0	0	0
National Democratic Alternative	9,964	1.79	—N/a	—N/a	0	—N/a
People–Animals–Nature	7,935	1.43	▲0.2	0	0	0
New Right	2,616	0.47	—N/a	—N/a	0	—N/a
React, Include, Recycle	2,234	0.40	▲0.0	0	0	0
Portuguese Workers' Communist	1,897	0.34	—N/a	—N/a	0	—N/a
Volt Portugal	771	0.14	▲0.1	0	0	0
Alternative 21 (Earth Party/Alliance)	673	0.12	▼0.0	0	0	0
Together for the People	590	0.11	▲0.1	0	0	0
We, the Citizens!	534	0.10	—N/a	—N/a	0	—N/a
Rise Up	515	0.09	▼0.0	0	0	0
Total valid	541,502	97.33	▼0.8	19	19	0
Blank ballots	9,588	1.72	▲0.6			
Invalid ballots	5,277	0.95	▲0.2			
Total	556,367	100.00				
Registered voters/turnout	780,163	71.31	▲7.6			

=== Bragança ===
Summary of the 10 March 2024 Assembly of the Republic elections results in Bragança
Parties	Votes	%	±pp swing	MPs		
Parties	Votes	%	±pp swing	2022	2024	±
Democratic Alliance (PSD/CDS–PP/PPM)	29,077	40.01	▼2.4	1	2	▲1
Socialist	21,538	29.64	▼13.3	2	1	▼1
Chega	13,216	18.19	▲9.6	0	0	0
National Democratic Alternative	1,587	2.18	—N/a	—N/a	0	—N/a
Left Bloc	1,404	1.93	▼0.2	0	0	0
Liberal Initiative	1,245	1.71	▲0.1	0	0	0
Unitary Democratic Coalition	773	1.06	▼0.3	0	0	0
LIVRE	727	1.00	▲0.7	0	0	0
People–Animals–Nature	598	0.82	▲0.2	0	0	0
New Right	316	0.43	—N/a	—N/a	0	—N/a
React, Include, Recycle	169	0.23	▼0.2	0	0	0
Rise Up	109	0.15	▲0.1	0	0	0
Alternative 21 (Earth Party/Alliance)	52	0.07	▼0.1	0	0	0
Total valid	70,811	97.42	▼0.5	3	3	0
Blank ballots	890	1.22	▲0.4			
Invalid ballots	972	1.34	▲0.1			
Total	72,673	100.00				
Registered voters/turnout	134,213	54.15	▲6.4			

=== Castelo Branco ===
Summary of the 10 March 2024 Assembly of the Republic elections results in Castelo Branco
Parties	Votes	%	±pp swing	MPs		
Parties	Votes	%	±pp swing	2022	2024	±
Socialist	37,052	34.22	▼13.4	3	2	▼1
Democratic Alliance (PSD/CDS–PP/PPM)	30,803	28.45	▼0.5	1	1	0
Chega	21,131	19.52	▲11.2	0	1	▲1
Left Bloc	4,451	4.11	▼0.1	0	0	0
Liberal Initiative	2,959	2.73	▲0.2	0	0	0
Unitary Democratic Coalition	2,372	2.19	▼0.7	0	0	0
LIVRE	2,171	2.01	▲1.2	0	0	0
National Democratic Alternative	1,491	1.38	▲1.2	0	0	0
People–Animals–Nature	1,427	1.32	▲0.3	0	0	0
Portuguese Workers' Communist	441	0.41	▲0.1	0	0	0
React, Include, Recycle	367	0.34	▲0.1	0	0	0
New Right	315	0.29	—N/a	—N/a	0	—N/a
Volt Portugal	168	0.16	—N/a	—N/a	0	—N/a
Rise Up	100	0.09	▲0.0	0	0	0
Total valid	105,248	97.22	▼0.3	4	4	0
Blank ballots	1,529	1.41	▲0.2			
Invalid ballots	1,491	1.38	▲0.2			
Total	108,268	100.00				
Registered voters/turnout	163,578	66.19	▲8.6			

=== Coimbra ===
Summary of the 10 March 2024 Assembly of the Republic elections results in Coimbra
Parties	Votes	%	±pp swing	MPs		
Parties	Votes	%	±pp swing	2022	2024	±
Socialist	79,086	32.67	▼12.6	6	4	▼2
Democratic Alliance (PSD/CDS–PP/PPM)	74,019	30.58	▼0.1	3	3	0
Chega	37,412	15.46	▲9.3	0	2	▲2
Left Bloc	12,334	5.10	▲0.0	0	0	0
Liberal Initiative	9,587	3.96	▲0.3	0	0	0
LIVRE	6,880	2.84	▲1.8	0	0	0
Unitary Democratic Coalition	6,816	2.82	▼0.6	0	0	0
People–Animals–Nature	3,835	1.58	▲0.4	0	0	0
National Democratic Alternative	2,421	1.00	—N/a	—N/a	0	—N/a
React, Include, Recycle	730	0.30	▼0.3	0	0	0
New Right	577	0.24	—N/a	—N/a	0	—N/a
Volt Portugal	427	0.18	▲0.1	0	0	0
Together for the People	187	0.08	—N/a	—N/a	0	—N/a
Alternative 21 (Earth Party/Alliance)	185	0.06	▼0.2	0	0	0
Rise Up	140	0.08	▲0.0	0	0	0
Total valid	234,636	96.95	▼0.3	9	9	0
Blank ballots	4,795	1.98	▲0.5			
Invalid ballots	2,636	1.09	▼0.0			
Total	242,067	100.00				
Registered voters/turnout	371,745	65.12	▲7.7			

=== Évora ===
Summary of the 10 March 2024 Assembly of the Republic elections results in Évora
Parties	Votes	%	±pp swing	MPs		
Parties	Votes	%	±pp swing	2022	2024	±
Socialist	29,309	32.79	▼11.2	2	1	▼1
Democratic Alliance (PSD/CDS–PP/PPM)	20,049	22.43	▼0.1	1	1	0
Chega	17,846	19.96	▲10.8	0	1	▲1
Unitary Democratic Coalition	9,771	10.93	▼3.6	0	0	0
Left Bloc	3,816	4.27	▲0.9	0	0	0
Liberal Initiative	2,227	2.49	▲0.0	0	0	0
LIVRE	1,773	1.98	▲1.4	0	0	0
People–Animals–Nature	991	1.11	▲0.3	0	0	0
National Democratic Alternative	838	0.94	—N/a	—N/a	0	—N/a
React, Include, Recycle	273	0.31	▼0.0	0	0	0
New Right	160	0.18	—N/a	—N/a	0	—N/a
Volt Portugal	151	0.17	▲0.1	0	0	0
Rise Up	81	0.09	▲0.0	0	0	0
Alternative 21 (Earth Party/Alliance)	41	0.05	▼0.0	0	0	0
Total valid	87,326	97.70	▼0.4	3	3	0
Blank ballots	1,251	1.40	▲0.3			
Invalid ballots	810	0.91	▲0.2			
Total	89,387	100.00				
Registered voters/turnout	133,400	67.01	▲8.5			

=== Faro ===
Summary of the 10 March 2024 Assembly of the Republic elections results in Faro
Parties	Votes	%	±pp swing	MPs		
Parties	Votes	%	±pp swing	2022	2024	±
Chega	64,228	27.19	▲14.9	1	3	▲2
Socialist	60,123	25.46	▼14.4	5	3	▼2
Democratic Alliance (PSD/CDS–PP/PPM)	52,885	22.39	▼3.0	3	3	0
Left Bloc	13,579	5.75	▼0.0	0	0	0
Liberal Initiative	10,761	4.56	▼0.1	0	0	0
Unitary Democratic Coalition	7,518	3.18	▼1.6	0	0	0
LIVRE	6,501	2.75	▲1.7	0	0	0
People–Animals–Nature	6,098	2.58	▲0.4	0	0	0
National Democratic Alternative	4,926	2.09	▲1.5	0	0	0
React, Include, Recycle	1,074	0.45	▲0.1	0	0	0
New Right	782	0.33	—N/a	—N/a	0	—N/a
Together for the People	611	0.26	—N/a	—N/a	0	—N/a
Volt Portugal	591	0.25	▲0.1	0	0	0
Rise Up	330	0.14	▲0.0	0	0	0
Total valid	230,007	97.38	▼0.4	9	9	0
Blank ballots	3,407	1.44	▲0.1			
Invalid ballots	2,779	1.18	▲0.2			
Total	236,193	100.00				
Registered voters/turnout	382,586	61.74	▲10.5			

=== Guarda ===
Summary of the 10 March 2024 Assembly of the Republic elections results in Guarda
Parties	Votes	%	±pp swing	MPs		
Parties	Votes	%	±pp swing	2022	2024	±
Democratic Alliance (PSD/CDS–PP/PPM)	29,033	34.12	▼1.6	1	1	0
Socialist	27,133	31.88	▼13.2	2	1	▼1
Chega	15,821	18.59	▲10.6	0	1	▲1
Left Bloc	2,301	2.70	▼0.4	0	0	0
National Democratic Alternative	2,181	2.56	—N/a	—N/a	0	—N/a
Liberal Initiative	1,913	2.25	▲0.3	0	0	0
Unitary Democratic Coalition	1,332	1.57	▼0.2	0	0	0
LIVRE	1,151	1.35	▲0.8	0	0	0
People–Animals–Nature	821	0.96	▲0.3	0	0	0
New Right	292	0.34	—N/a	—N/a	0	—N/a
React, Include, Recycle	289	0.34	▼0.1	0	0	0
Rise Up	165	0.19	▲0.0	0	0	0
Volt Portugal	95	0.11	▼0.0	0	0	0
Alternative 21 (Earth Party/Alliance)	80	0.09	0.0	0	0	0
Total valid	82,607	97.05	▼0.9	3	3	0
Blank ballots	1,163	1.37	▲0.4			
Invalid ballots	1,333	1.57	▲0.3			
Total	85,103	100.00				
Registered voters/turnout	141,450	60.17	▲7.4			

=== Leiria ===
Summary of the 10 March 2024 Assembly of the Republic elections results in Leiria
Parties	Votes	%	±pp swing	MPs		
Parties	Votes	%	±pp swing	2022	2024	±
Democratic Alliance (PSD/CDS–PP/PPM)	96,311	35.21	▼1.5	4	5	▲1
Socialist	61,535	22.50	▼13.2	5	3	▼2
Chega	53,764	19.66	▲11.6	1	2	▲1
Liberal Initiative	15,446	5.65	▲0.4	0	0	0
Left Bloc	11,736	4.29	▼0.3	0	0	0
LIVRE	7,197	2.63	▲1.6	0	0	0
Unitary Democratic Coalition	6,600	2.41	▼0.7	0	0	0
People–Animals–Nature	4,645	1.70	▲0.4	0	0	0
National Democratic Alternative	4,560	1.67	▲1.3	0	0	0
React, Include, Recycle	1141	0.42	▼0.0	0	0	0
New Right	741	0.27	—N/a	—N/a	0	—N/a
Volt Portugal	552	0.20	▲0.1	0	0	0
Rise Up	340	0.12	▲0.1	0	'0	0
Alternative 21 (Earth Party/Alliance)	306	0.11	▼0.0	0	0	0
Total valid	264,874	96.84	▼0.4	10	10	0
Blank ballots	5,081	1.86	▲0.2			
Invalid ballots	3,560	1.30	▲0.2			
Total	273,515	100.00				
Registered voters/turnout	412,184	66.36	▲9.3			

=== Lisbon ===
Summary of the 10 March 2024 Assembly of the Republic elections results in Lisbon
Parties	Votes	%	±pp swing	MPs		
Parties	Votes	%	±pp swing	2022	2024	±
Socialist	365,838	27.73	▼13.1	21	15	▼6
Democratic Alliance (PSD/CDS–PP/PPM)	356,698	27.04	▲1.2	13	14	▲1
Chega	224,526	17.02	▲9.3	4	9	▲5
Liberal Initiative	86,847	6.58	▼1.3	4	3	▼1
LIVRE	72,102	5.47	▲3.0	1	2	▲1
Left Bloc	65,438	4.96	▲0.2	2	2	0
Unitary Democratic Coalition	49,257	3.73	▼1.4	2	2	0
People–Animals–Nature	32,829	2.49	▲0.5	1	1	0
National Democratic Alternative	19,074	1.45	▲1.2	0	0	0
Portuguese Workers' Communist	4,464	0.34	▼0.1	0	0	0
Volt Portugal	2,963	0.22	▲0.1	0	0	0
React, Include, Recycle	2,854	0.22	▼0.1	0	0	0
New Right	2,365	0.18	—N/a	—N/a	0	—N/a
Labour	1,331	0.10	▲0.1	0	0	0
Alternative 21 (Earth Party/Alliance)	1,174	0.09	▼0.1	0	0	0
Rise Up	1,000	0.08	▲0.0	0	0	0
Together for the People	848	0.06	▼0.0	0	0	0
Socialist Alternative Movement	0	0.00	▼0.1	0	0	0
Total valid	1,289,608	97.76	▼0.4	48	48	0
Blank ballots	15,711	1.19	▲0.2			
Invalid ballots	13,820	1.05	▲0.2			
Total	1,319,139	100.00				
Registered voters/turnout	1,915,172	68.88	▲7.3			

=== Madeira ===
Summary of the 10 March 2024 Assembly of the Republic elections results in Madeira
Parties	Votes	%	±pp swing	MPs		
Parties	Votes	%	±pp swing	2022	2024	±
Madeira First (PSD/CDS–PP)	52,992	35.38	▼4.5	3	3	0
Socialist	29,723	19.84	▼11.6	3	2	▼1
Chega	26,296	17.56	▲11.5	0	1	▲1
Together for the People	14,344	9.58	▲2.7	0	0	0
Liberal Initiative	5,827	3.89	▲0.6	0	0	0
Left Bloc	4,404	2.94	▼0.3	0	0	0
People–Animals–Nature	3,127	2.09	▲0.5	0	0	0
Unitary Democratic Coalition	2,429	1.62	▼0.4	0	0	0
National Democratic Alternative	2,348	1.57	▲1.1	0	0	0
LIVRE	1,864	1.24	▲0.5	0	0	0
React, Include, Recycle	725	0.48	▲0.1	0	0	0
Labour	719	0.48	▼0.0	0	0	0
People's Monarchist	451	0.30	▲0.1	0	0	0
We, the Citizens!	305	0.20	—N/a	—N/a	0	—N/a
Volt Portugal	283	0.19	—N/a	—N/a	0	—N/a
Rise Up	239	0.16	▼0.0	0	0	0
Alternative 21 (Earth Party/Alliance)	228	0.15	▼0.2	0	0	0
Total valid	146,304	97.67	▲0.1	6	6	0
Blank ballots	794	0.53	▼0.1			
Invalid ballots	2,685	1.79	▼0.0			
Total	149,783	100.00				
Registered voters/turnout	254,553	58.85	▲9.3			

=== Portalegre ===
Summary of the 10 March 2024 Assembly of the Republic elections results in Portalegre
Parties	Votes	%	±pp swing	MPs		
Parties	Votes	%	±pp swing	2022	2024	±
Socialist	20,658	34.05	▼13.2	2	1	▼1
Chega	14,915	24.59	▲13.1	0	1	▲1
Democratic Alliance (PSD/CDS–PP/PPM)	14,132	23.30	▼1.1	0	0	0
Unitary Democratic Coalition	3,604	5.94	▼1.6	0	0	0
Left Bloc	1,894	3.12	▲0.2	0	0	0
Liberal Initiative	1,146	1.89	▼0.2	0	0	0
LIVRE	873	1.44	▲0.9	0	0	0
National Democratic Alternative	631	1.04	—N/a	—N/a	0	—N/a
People–Animals–Nature	506	0.83	▲0.2	0	0	0
Portuguese Workers' Communist	303	0.50	▲0.1	0	0	0
React, Include, Recycle	176	0.29	▲0.1	0	0	0
New Right	121	0.20	—N/a	—N/a	0	—N/a
Volt Portugal	54	0.09	▲0.0	0	0	0
Rise Up	53	0.09	▲0.0	0	0	0
Alternative 21 (Earth Party/Alliance)	31	0.05	▼0.0	0	0	0
Total valid	59,097	97.42	▼0.6	2	2	0
Blank ballots	920	1.52	▲0.4			
Invalid ballots	645	1.06	▲0.2			
Total	60,662	100.00				
Registered voters/turnout	93,106	65.15	▲8.4			

=== Porto ===
Summary of the 10 March 2024 Assembly of the Republic elections results in Porto
Parties	Votes	%	±pp swing	MPs		
Parties	Votes	%	±pp swing	2022	2024	±
Democratic Alliance (PSD/CDS–PP/PPM)	339,096	30.42	▼3.4	14	14	0
Socialist	338,084	30.33	▼12.2	19	13	▼6
Chega	170,910	15.33	▲11.0	2	7	▲5
Liberal Initiative	64,050	5.75	▲0.6	2	2	0
Left Bloc	51,909	4.66	▼0.1	2	2	0
LIVRE	37,319	3.35	▲2.2	0	1	▲1
Unitary Democratic Coalition	26,343	2.36	▼0.9	1	1	0
People–Animals–Nature	23,415	2.10	▲0.4	0	0	0
National Democratic Alternative	19,585	1.76	▲1.6	0	0	0
React, Include, Recycle	9,163	0.82	▲0.1	0	0	0
Portuguese Workers' Communist	3,444	0.31	—N/a	—N/a	0	—N/a
New Right	1,786	0.16	—N/a	—N/a	0	—N/a
Volt Portugal	1,647	0.15	▲0.1	0	0	0
Together for the People	1,150	0.10	▲0.1	0	0	0
We, the Citizens!	788	0.07	▼0.0	0	0	0
Rise Up	740	0.07	▼0.0	0	0	0
Total valid	1,089,429	97.74	▲0.4	40	40	0
Blank ballots	14,404	1.29	▲0.3			
Invalid ballots	11,035	0.99	▲0.2			
Total	1,114,868	100.00				
Registered voters/turnout	1,591,759	70.04	▲8.2			

=== Santarém ===
Summary of the 10 March 2024 Assembly of the Republic elections results in Santarém
Parties	Votes	%	±pp swing	MPs		
Parties	Votes	%	±pp swing	2022	2024	±
Socialist	69,915	27.85	▼13.3	5	3	▼2
Democratic Alliance (PSD/CDS–PP/PPM)	68,493	27.28	▼1.5	3	3	0
Chega	58,554	23.32	▲12.4	1	3	▲2
Left Bloc	11,204	4.46	▼0.1	0	0	0
Unitary Democratic Coalition	10,343	4.12	▼1.3	0	0	0
Liberal Initiative	9,492	3.78	▲0.0	0	0	0
LIVRE	6,186	2.46	▲1.6	0	0	0
People–Animals–Nature	3,926	1.56	▲0.4	0	0	0
National Democratic Alternative	3,505	1.40	—N/a	—N/a	0	—N/a
React, Include, Recycle	951	0.38	▼0.0	0	0	0
Volt Portugal	567	0.23	▲0.1	0	0	0
New Right	463	0.18	—N/a	—N/a	0	—N/a
Rise Up	363	0.14	▲0.0	0	0	0
Alternative 21 (Earth Party/Alliance)	295	0.12	▼0.0	0	0	0
Total valid	244,257	97.28	▼0.5	9	9	0
Blank ballots	3,868	1.54	▲0.3			
Invalid ballots	2,939	1.17	▲0.2			
Total	251,064	100.00				
Registered voters/turnout	377,261	66.55	▲8.8			

=== Setúbal ===
Summary of the 10 March 2024 Assembly of the Republic elections results in Setúbal
Parties	Votes	%	±pp swing	MPs		
Parties	Votes	%	±pp swing	2022	2024	±
Socialist	157,166	31.27	▼14.5	10	7	▼3
Chega	102,077	20.31	▲11.3	1	4	▲3
Democratic Alliance (PSD/CDS–PP/PPM)	86,297	17.17	▼0.1	3	4	▲1
Unitary Democratic Coalition	38,841	7.73	▼2.3	2	1	▼1
Left Bloc	30,161	6.00	▲0.3	1	1	0
Liberal Initiative	26,941	5.36	▲0.2	1	1	0
LIVRE	21,552	4.29	▲2.9	0	1	▲1
People–Animals–Nature	12,856	2.56	▲0.6	0	0	0
National Democratic Alternative	7,661	1.52	▲1.2	0	0	0
Portuguese Workers' Communist	2,363	0.47	▲0.1	0	0	0
React, Include, Recycle	1,323	0.26	▲0.1	0	0	0
New Right	1,235	0.25	—N/a	—N/a	0	—N/a
Volt Portugal	965	0.19	▲0.1	0	0	0
Rise Up	558	0.11	▲0.0	0	0	0
Alternative 21 (Earth Party/Alliance)	438	0.09	▼0.0	0	0	0
Together for the People	430	0.09	▲0.0	0	0	0
Labour	393	0.08	▲0.0	0	0	0
Total valid	491,257	97.75	▼0.4	18	19	▲1
Blank ballots	6,256	1.24	▲0.2			
Invalid ballots	5,074	1.01	▲0.2			
Total	502,587	100.00				
Registered voters/turnout	751,292	66.90	▲8.8			

=== Viana do Castelo ===
Summary of the 10 March 2024 Assembly of the Republic elections results in Viana do Castelo
Parties	Votes	%	±pp swing	MPs		
Parties	Votes	%	±pp swing	2022	2024	±
Democratic Alliance (PSD/CDS–PP/PPM)	49,613	34.72	▼2.8	3	2	▼1
Socialist	40,237	28.15	▼13.9	3	2	▼1
Chega	26,635	18.64	▲12.6	0	1	▲1
Liberal Initiative	5,106	3.57	▲0.7	0	0	0
Left Bloc	4,926	3.45	▼0.0	0	0	0
Unitary Democratic Coalition	3,106	2.17	▼0.8	0	0	0
LIVRE	2,813	1.97	▲1.3	0	0	0
National Democratic Alternative	2,263	1.58	—N/a	—N/a	0	—N/a
People–Animals–Nature	2,057	1.44	▲0.5	0	0	0
New Right	706	0.49	—N/a	—N/a	0	—N/a
React, Include, Recycle	624	0.44	0.0	0	0	0
Volt Portugal	255	0.18	▲0.1	0	0	0
Alternative 21 (Earth Party/Alliance)	204	0.14	▼0.2	0	0	0
Rise Up	147	0.10	0.0	0	0	0
Total valid	138,692	97.04	▼0.7	6	5	▼1
Blank ballots	2,682	1.88	▲0.6			
Invalid ballots	1,539	1.08	▲0.2			
Total	142,913	100.00				
Registered voters/turnout	233,491	61.21	▲7.4			

=== Vila Real ===
Summary of the 10 March 2024 Assembly of the Republic elections results in Vila Real
Parties	Votes	%	±pp swing	MPs		
Parties	Votes	%	±pp swing	2022	2024	±
Democratic Alliance (PSD/CDS–PP/PPM)	46,040	39.33	▼2.3	2	2	0
Socialist	34,654	29.60	▼11.7	3	2	▼1
Chega	20,032	17.11	▲9.9	0	1	▲1
National Democratic Alternative	2,958	2.53	—N/a	—N/a	0	—N/a
Left Bloc	2,865	2.45	▲0.1	0	0	0
Liberal Initiative	2,378	2.03	▲0.2	0	0	0
Unitary Democratic Coalition	1,599	1.37	▼0.3	0	0	0
LIVRE	1,592	1.36	▲0.8	0	0	0
People–Animals–Nature	1,062	0.91	▲0.1	0	0	0
React, Include, Recycle	319	0.27	▼0.1	0	0	0
New Right	278	0.24	—N/a	—N/a	0	—N/a
Volt Portugal	122	0.10	▲0.0	0	0	0
Rise Up	117	0.10	▲0.0	0	0	0
Total valid	114,016	97.36	▼0.7	5	5	0
Blank ballots	1,494	1.28	▲0.4			
Invalid ballots	1,546	1.32	▲0.3			
Total	117,056	100.00				
Registered voters/turnout	208,667	56.10	▲6.7			

=== Viseu ===
Summary of the 10 March 2024 Assembly of the Republic elections results in Viseu
Parties	Votes	%	±pp swing	MPs		
Parties	Votes	%	±pp swing	2022	2024	±
Democratic Alliance (PSD/CDS–PP/PPM)	76,927	36.36	▼2.5	4	3	▼1
Socialist	58,077	27.45	▼14.1	4	3	▼1
Chega	41,159	19.45	▲11.7	0	2	▲2
National Democratic Alternative	6,615	3.13	▲3.0	0	0	0
Liberal Initiative	5,948	2.81	▲0.3	0	0	0
Left Bloc	5,846	2.76	▼0.1	0	0	0
LIVRE	3,566	1.69	▲1.1	0	0	0
Unitary Democratic Coalition	2,905	1.37	▼0.3	0	0	0
People–Animals–Nature	2,554	1.21	▲0.3	0	0	0
React, Include, Recycle	831	0.39	▲0.0	0	0	0
New Right	544	0.26	—N/a	—N/a	0	—N/a
Volt Portugal	342	0.16	0.0	0	0	0
Alternative 21 (Earth Party/Alliance)	179	0.08	0.0	0	0	0
Rise Up	164	0.08	▼0.0	0	0	0
Total valid	205,657	97.20	▼0.5	8	8	0
Blank ballots	3,302	1.56	▲0.4			
Invalid ballots	2,627	1.24	▲0.2			
Total	211,586	100.00				
Registered voters/turnout	335,659	63.04	▲8.9			

=== Europe ===
Summary of the 10 March 2024 Assembly of the Republic elections results in Europe
Parties	Votes	%	±pp swing	MPs		
Parties	Votes	%	±pp swing	2022	2024	±
Chega	42,972	18.31	▲11.2	0	1	▲1
Socialist	38,061	16.22	▼16.8	2	1	▼1
Democratic Alliance (PSD/CDS–PP/PPM)	33,350	14.21	▼1.8	0	0	0
Left Bloc	6,438	2.74	▲0.3	0	0	0
Liberal Initiative	5,719	2.44	▼0.0	0	0	0
People–Animals–Nature	5,174	2.20	▼0.5	0	0	0
LIVRE	4,091	1.74	▲0.3	0	0	0
Unitary Democratic Coalition	2,363	1.01	▼0.3	0	0	0
National Democratic Alternative	953	0.41	▲0.2	0	0	0
Volt Portugal	761	0.32	▼0.1	0	0	0
Portuguese Workers' Communist	748	0.32	▼0.2	0	0	0
Together for the People	560	0.24	—N/a	—N/a	0	—N/a
We, the Citizens!	509	0.22	▼0.1	0	0	0
New Right	502	0.21	—N/a	—N/a	0	—N/a
React, Include, Recycle	453	0.19	▼0.2	0	0	0
Rise Up	182	0.08	▲0.0	0	0	0
Alternative 21 (Earth Party/Alliance)	120	0.05	▼0.6	0	0	0
Total valid	142,956	60.92	▼8.46	2	2	0
Blank ballots	1,379	0.59	▼0.1			
Invalid ballots	90,319	38.49	▲8.5			
Total	234,654	100.00				
Registered voters/turnout	937,311	25.03	▲13.2			

=== Outside Europe ===
Summary of the 10 March 2024 Assembly of the Republic elections results in Outside Europe
Parties	Votes	%	±pp swing	MPs		
Parties	Votes	%	±pp swing	2022	2024	±
Democratic Alliance (PSD/CDS–PP/PPM)	22,636	22.90	▼14.6	1	1	0
Chega	18,067	18.27	▲8.7	0	1	▲1
Socialist	14,410	14.58	▼15.2	1	0	▼1
People–Animals–Nature	2,332	2.36	▼2.1	0	0	0
Liberal Initiative	1,902	1.92	▼1.6	0	0	0
Left Bloc	1,847	1.87	▼0.7	0	0	0
New Right	1,461	1.48	—N/a	—N/a	0	—N/a
National Democratic Alternative	1,128	1.14	▲0.1	0	0	0
Unitary Democratic Coalition	748	0.76	▼0.7	0	0	0
LIVRE	697	0.70	▼0.3	0	0	0
Volt Portugal	273	0.28	▼0.2	0	0	0
We, the Citizens!	260	0.26	▼0.7	0	0	0
Together for the People	202	0.20	—N/a	—N/a	0	—N/a
React, Include, Recycle	186	0.19	▼0.3	0	0	0
Rise Up	122	0.12	▼0.2	0	0	0
Alternative 21 (Earth Party/Alliance)	100	0.10	▼1.5	0	0	0
Total valid	66,371	67.13	▼29.8	2	2	0
Blank ballots	487	0.49	▼0.4			
Invalid ballots	32,008	32.38	▲30.2			
Total	98,866	100.00				
Registered voters/turnout	609,436	16.22	▲5.4			
