= Partido Liberal Social (Portugal) =

Social Liberal Party Partido Liberal Social
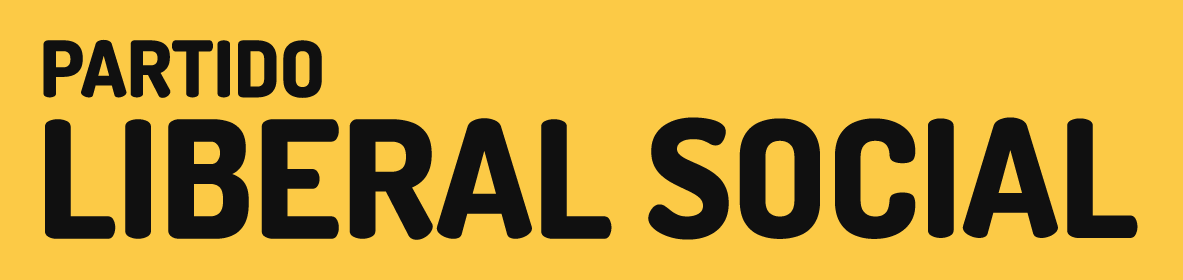
- Abbreviation: PLS
- Leader: José Cardoso
- Founded: 11 March 2025
- Headquarters: Lisbon
- Ideology: Social liberalism
- Colours: Gold
- Assembly of the Republic: 0 / 230
- European Parliament: 0 / 21
- Regional Parliaments: 0 / 104
- Local government: 0 / 2,086

Website
- www.partidoliberalsocial.pt

Partido Liberal Social (lit. 'Social Liberal Party'; PLS) is a Portuguese political party which was founded in 2024. On 11 March 2025 its inscription was accepted by the Portuguese Constitutional Court.

== History ==
José Cardoso, a year after his defeat in the elections to the leadership of the Liberal Initiative, resigned from the party and showed intentions to start a new political party. The project of the Liberal Social Party was born in the same year, whose necessary signatures for legalisation were delivered in September, having, but was initially rejected by the Constitutional Court.

== Electoral Program - Legislature 2025 ==
The Liberal Social Party's electoral program is based on 5 priorities and 12 ideas to change Portugal. They are:

Reinforce Democracy

01 - Building a Justice System that Guarantees Individual Freedom

02 - Implementing a Digital Electoral System with Nominal Candidacies

Reforming the State

03 - Decentralizing and Managing the Territory with Purpose

04 - Establishing a Culture of Merit and Transparency

05 - Consolidating an Active and Strategic Foreign Policy

Dynamicizing Public Policies

06 - Reformulating the State's Relationship with Society and Markets

07 - Developing a National Housing Strategy

Fostering Socioeconomic Development

08 - Leveraging the Sea as a Differentiating Economic Strategy

09 - Investing in Technology and Science as Pillars of Development

10 - Defending Ecology as a Culture of Development

Betting on Human Development

11 - Acting Socially with Commitment

12 - Promote an Education focused on Personal Skills

== Election results ==
=== Assembly of the Republic ===
Election	Leader	Votes	%	Seats	+/-	Government
2025	José Cardoso	7,332	0.1 (#16)	0 / 230	New	No seats

== See also ==
- Politics of Portugal
- List of political parties in Portugal
