= Nova Direita =

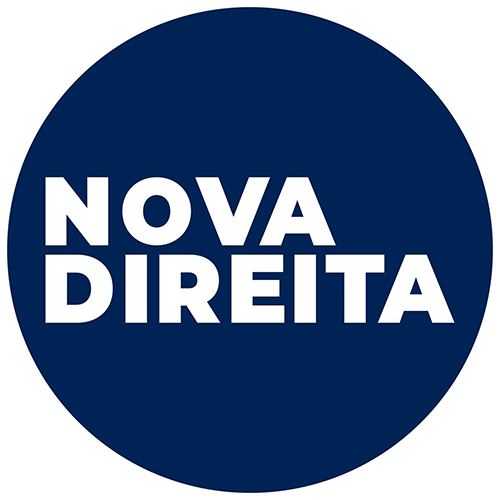
- Abbreviation: ND
- President: Ossanda Liber
- Founder: Ossanda Liber
- Founded: 9 January 2024; 17 months ago
- Split from: Alliance
- Headquarters: Avenida António Serpa, 32-8b, 1050-027, Lisbon
- Ideology: National conservatism; Economic liberalism; Anti-immigration
- Political position: Right-wing
- International affiliation: National Conservatism Conference
- Colours: Blue
- Assembly of the Republic: 0 / 230
- European Parliament: 0 / 21
- Regional parliaments: 0 / 104
- Local government: 0 / 2,074

Election symbol

Website
- novadireita.pt

Nova Direita (Portuguese for 'New Right') is a political party in Portugal founded by Ossanda Liber, a former candidate for mayor of Lisbon in 2021, following her departure from Alliance. The party identifies as "conservative" and is seeking to replace CDS-PP in national politics after they left parliament following the 2022 legislative elections.

The party ran in the 2024 legislative elections, receiving 0.25% of the vote and winning no seats. The party also ran in the 2024 European Parliament election, receiving 0.16% of the vote and winning no seats.

== Ossanda Liber ==
Ossanda Líber João Filipe Cruz dos Santos (born 15 September 1977) is a Portuguese politician of Angolan descent.

Liber was born in the Angolan capital Luanda in 1977. She is a citizen of Portugal, Angola and France.

She was a candidate for Mayor of Lisbon in the 2021 local election, a candidate in the European constituency in the 2022 legislative elections, and was vice-president of the Alliance party.

== Election results ==
=== Assembly of the Republic ===
Election	Leader	Votes	%	Seats	+/-	Government
2024	Ossanda Liber	16,456	0.3 (#12)	0 / 230	New	Extra-parliamentary
2025	Ossanda Liber	10,216	0.2 (#14)	0 / 230	0	Extra-parliamentary

=== European Parliament ===
Election	List Leader	Votes	%	Seats	+/–	EP Group
2024	Ossanda Liber	6,438	0.2 (#13)	0 / 21	New	–
