= React, Include, Recycle =

Centrist political party in Portugal

React–Include–Recycle Reagir–Incluir–Reciclar
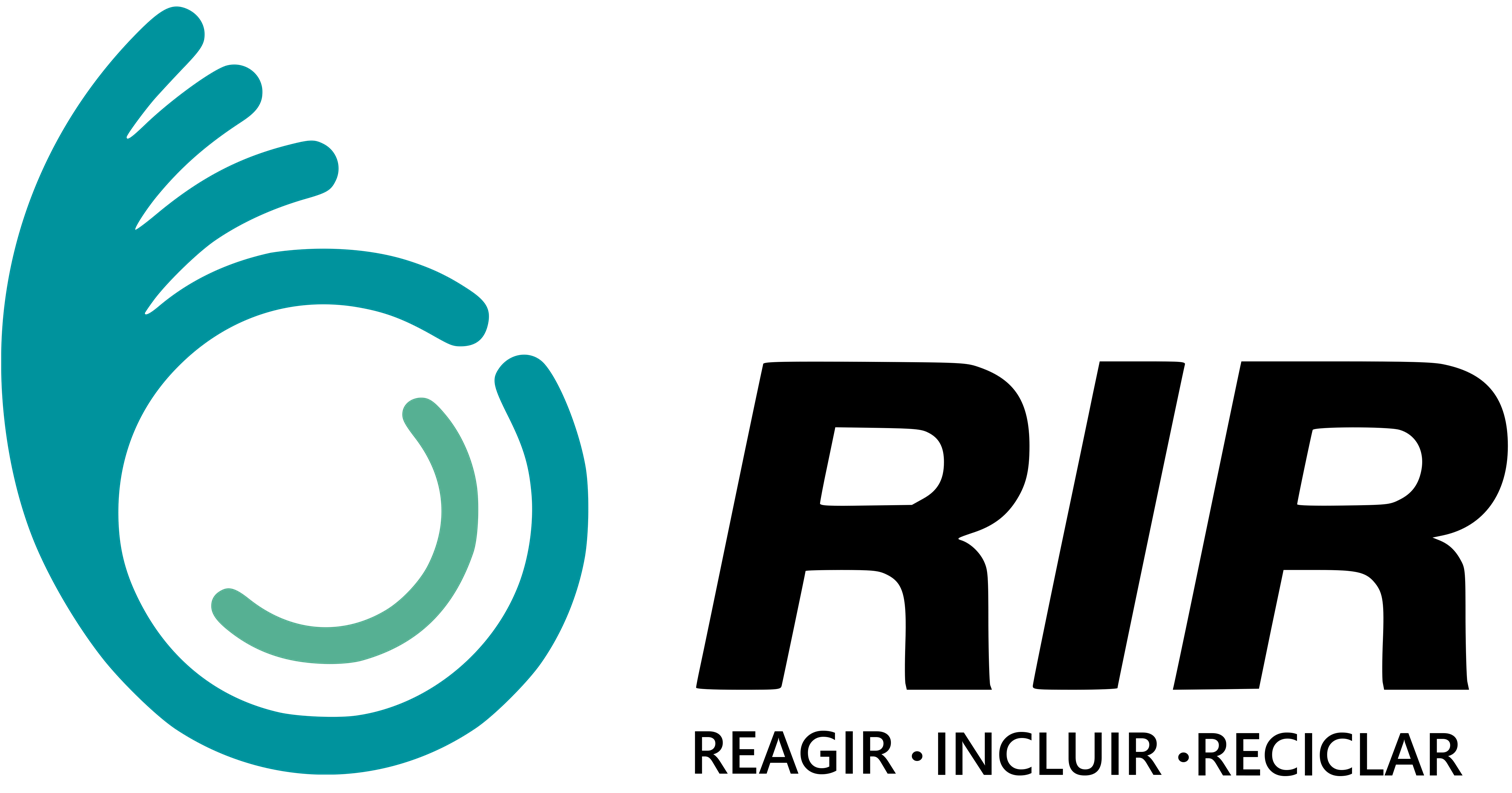
- Abbreviation: R.I.R.
- Leader: Márcia Henriques
- Founder: Vitorino Silva
- Founded: 30 May 2019
- Ideology: Humanism; Pacifism; Environmentalism; Universalism; Pro-Europeanism
- Political position: Centre
- Colors: Teal
- Assembly of the Republic: 0 / 230
- European Parliament: 0 / 21
- Regional Parliaments: 0 / 104

Election symbol
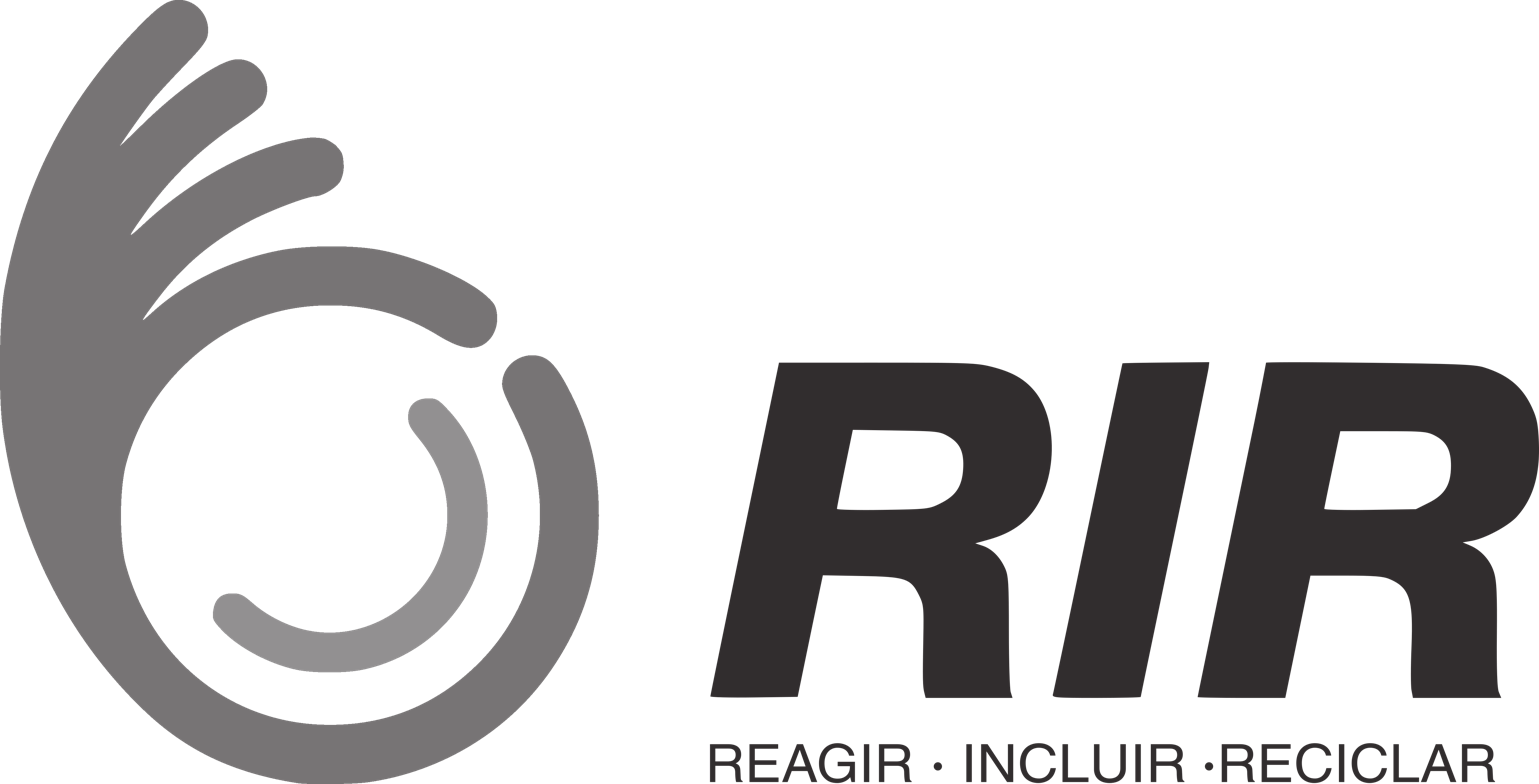

Party flag
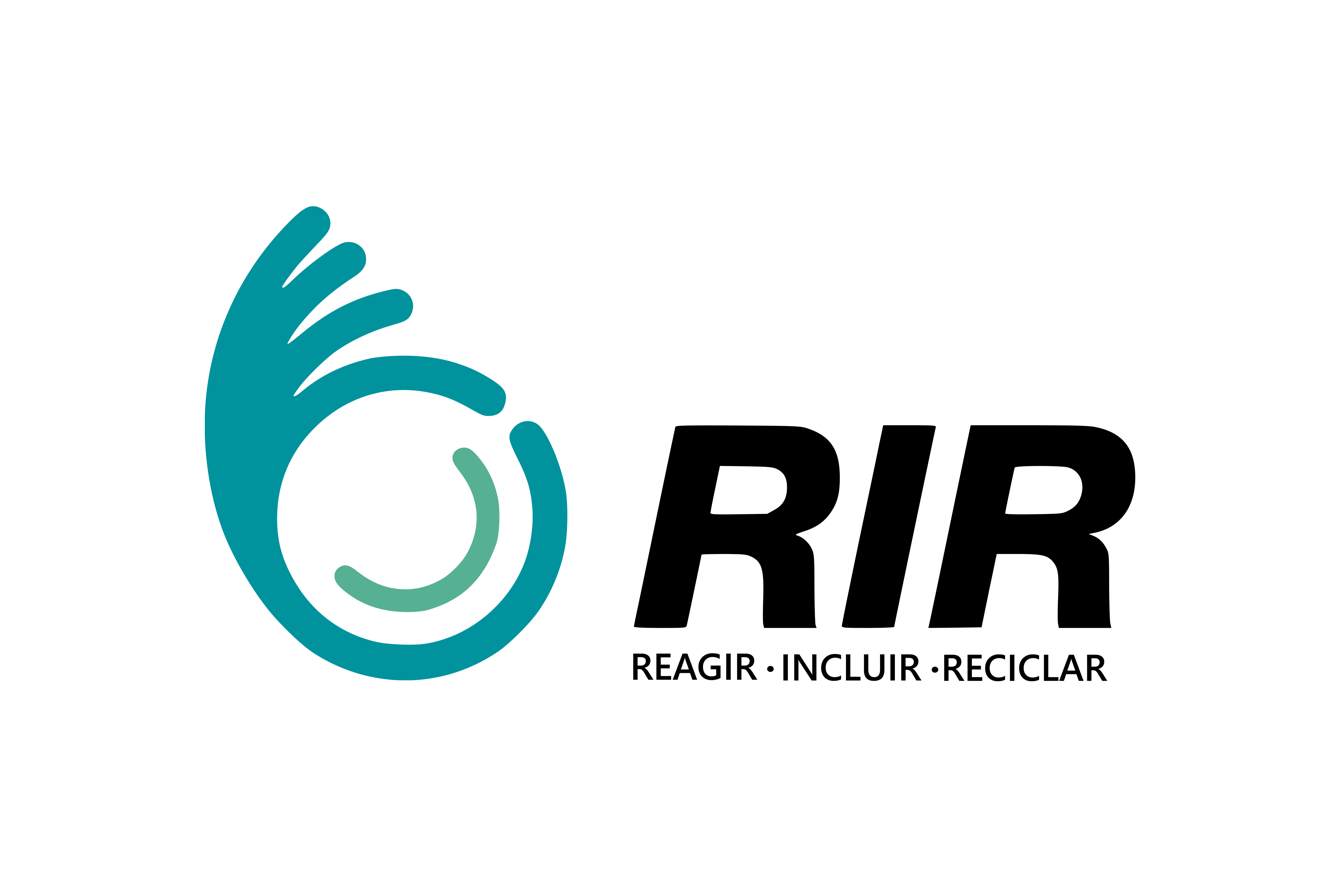

Website
- partido-rir.pt

React–Include–Recycle (Portuguese: Reagir–Incluir–Reciclar, R.I.R.) is a centrist Portuguese political party led by Vitorino Silva, better known as Tino de Rans. The RIR presents itself as a humanist, pacifist, environmentalist, pro-European and universalist party with the purpose of bringing voters and elected officials closer, seeking to return the emphasis on public service to politics.

== Election results ==
=== Assembly of the Republic ===
Election	Leader	Votes	%	Seats	+/-	Government
2019	Vitorino Silva	35,169	0.7 (#12)	0 / 230	New	No seats
2022	Vitorino Silva	22,553	0.4 (#10)	0 / 230	0	No seats
2024	Márcia Henriques	26,092	0.4 (#10)	0 / 230	0	No seats
2025	Márcia Henriques	14,021	0.2 (#11)	0 / 230	0	No seats

=== Presidential ===
Election	Candidate	Votes	%	Result
2021	Vitorino Silva	123,031	3.0 (#7)	Lost

=== European Parliament ===
Election	List Leader	Votes	%	Seats	+/–	EP Group
2024	Márcia Henriques	6,407	0.2 (#12)	0 / 21		–

=== Regional Assemblies ===
Region	Election	Leader	Votes	%	Seats	+/-	Government
Madeira	2024	Liana Reis	527	0.4 (#14)	0 / 47	0	No seats
