= 17th Legislature of the Third Portuguese Republic =

Meeting of legislative body in Portugal

←	16th Legislature

Overview
- Legislative body: Assembly of the Republic
- Jurisdiction: Portugal
- Meeting place: Palace of Saint Benedict
- Term: 3 June 2025 –
- Election: 18 May 2025
- Government: XXV Constitutional Government
- Website: parlamento.pt

Deputies
- Members: 230
- President: José Pedro Aguiar-Branco, PPD/PSD
- First Vice-President: Teresa Morais, PPD/PSD
- Second Vice-President: Diogo Pacheco de Amorim, CH
- Third Vice-President: Marcos Perestrello, PS
- Fourth Vice-President: Rodrigo Saraiva, IL
- First Secretary: Francisco Figueira, PPD/PSD
- Second Secretary: Gabriel Mithá Ribeiro, CH (2025); José de Carvalho, CH (since 2026)
- Third Secretary: Joana Ferreira Lima, PS
- Fourth Secretary: Germana Rocha, PPD/PSD

The 17th Legislature of the Third Portuguese Republic (Portuguese: XVII Legislatura da Terceira República Portuguesa) is the current meeting of the Assembly of the Republic. It first convened on 3 June 2025, with its membership being determined by the results of the 2025 Portuguese legislative election held the previous 18 May.

== Election ==
The 18th Portuguese legislative election was held on 18 May 2025. The Democratic Alliance (AD) was re-elected with a stronger mandate, albeit without a majority. For the first time in democracy, PS fell to third place, while Chega became the second-largest party in the Assembly.

Party	Assembly of the Republic			
Party	Votes	%	Seats	+/−
AD (Note: Sum of votes between the PSD/CDS–PP lists in mainland Portugal and Madeira with the PSD/CDS–PP/PPM list in the Azores. The 3 MPs elected in the Azores coalition are all from PPD/PSD.)	2,008,488	31.78	91	+11
Chega	1,438,554	22.76	60	+10
PS	1,442,546	22.83	58	–20
IL	338,974	5.36	9	+1
Livre	257,291	4.07	6	+2
CDU	183,686	2.91	3	–1
BE	125,808	1.99	1	–4
PAN	86,930	1.38	1	±0
JPP	20,900	0.33	1	+1
Other/blank/invalid	416,792	6.59	0	±0
Total	6,319,969	100.00	230	±0

== Composition (2025–present) ==
=== Current composition ===
Party	Parliamentary leader	Elected	
Party	Parliamentary leader	Seats	%
PPD/PSD	Hugo Soares (Braga)	89	38.7
Chega	Pedro Pinto (Faro)	60	26.1
PS	Pedro Delgado Alves (Coimbra) (2025); Eurico Brilhante Dias (Leiria) (since 2025)	58	25.2
IL	Mariana Leitão (Lisbon) (2025); Mário Amorim Lopes (Aveiro) (since 2025)	9	3.9
Livre	Isabel Mendes Lopes (Lisbon)	6	2.6
PCP	Paula Santos (Setúbal)	3	1.3
CDS–PP	Paulo Núncio (Lisbon)	2	0.9
BE	Mariana Mortágua (Lisbon) (2025–2026); Fabian Figueiredo (Lisbon (since 2026)	1	0.4
PAN	Inês Sousa Real (Lisbon)	1	0.4
JPP	Filipe Sousa (Madeira)	1	0.4
Total		230	100.0

==== Changes ====
- José Dias Fernandes, Chega (CH) → non-attached → Chega (CH): On 8 July 2026, José Dias Fernandes left the party's caucus, following a period of party infighting after the internal elections for the party's federations. Three hours later, he went back on this decision, rejoining Chega's parliamentary group.

== Election for President of the Assembly of the Republic ==
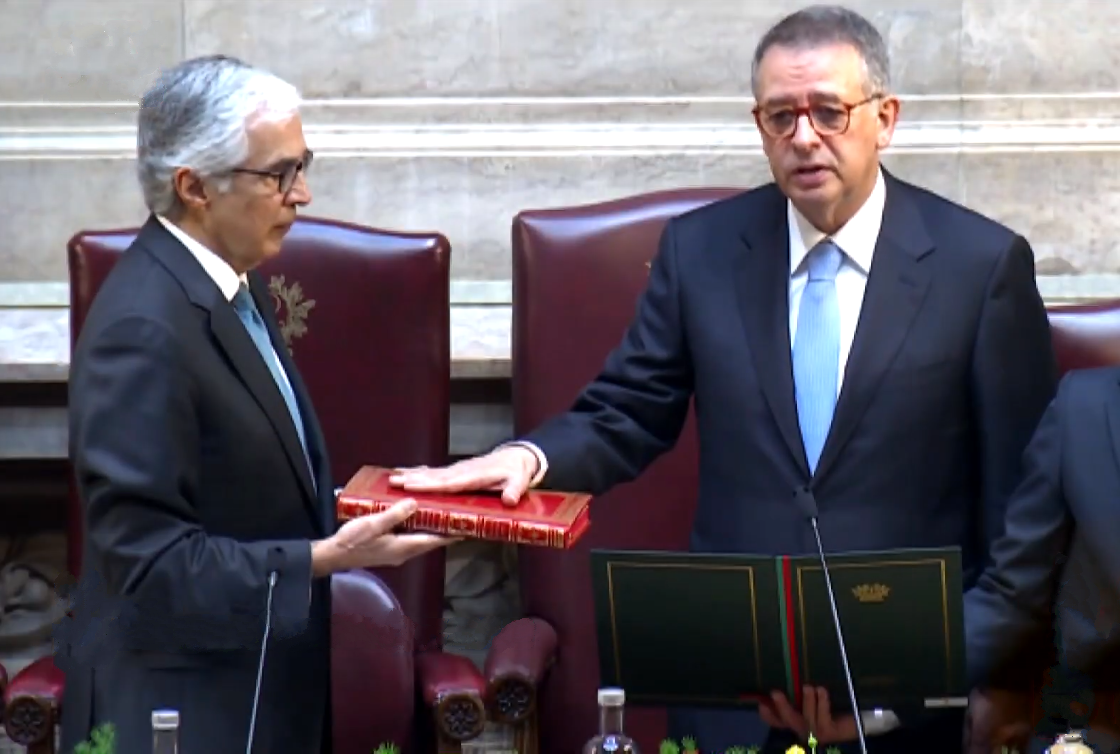
During the 17th Legislature, António José Seguro took the oath of office as President, being delivered by José Pedro Aguiar-Branco, on 9 March 2026.

The election of a new President of the Assembly of the Republic was held in the first session of the new Legislature, on 3 June 2025. Incumbent President José Pedro Aguiar-Branco, from the Social Democratic Party (PSD) was the sole candidate and was re-elected by a landslide.

Election of the President of the Assembly of the Republic
1st Ballot →	3 June 2025	
Required majority →	116 out of 230	
José Pedro Aguiar-Branco (PPD/PSD)	202 / 230	check
Blank ballots	25 / 230	
Invalid ballots	3 / 230	
Absentees	0 / 230	
Sources: Correio da Manhã

== Other elections for the bureau of the Assembly of the Republic ==
=== Vice Presidents of the Assembly of the Republic ===
The election of four new Vice Presidents of the Assembly of the Republic were held in the first session of the new Legislature. The name designated by Chega for second Vice President, incumbent Vice President Diogo Pacheco de Amorim, failed to be elected, which led to a vacancy in the seat.

Election of the Vice Presidents of the Assembly of the Republic
1st Ballot →	3 June 2025	
Required majority →	116 out of 230	
Teresa Morais (PPD/PSD)	196 / 230	check
Diogo Pacheco de Amorim (CH)	115 / 230	X mark
Marcos Perestrello (PS)	128 / 230	check
Rodrigo Saraiva (IL)	179 / 230	check
Absentees	0 / 230	
Sources: ECO

A second ballot was held on 17 June 2025, with Diogo Pacheco de Amorim once again being a candidate. This time, he was elected with 145 votes in favour.

Election of the 2nd Vice President of the Assembly of the Republic
2nd Ballot →	17 June 2025	
Required majority →	116 out of 230	
Diogo Pacheco de Amorim (CH)	145 / 230	check
Blank ballots	72 / 230	
Invalid ballots	12 / 230	
Absentees	1 / 230	
Sources: SIC Notícias

=== Secretaries of the Assembly of the Republic ===
Election of the Secretaries of the Assembly of the Republic
1st Ballot →	3 June 2025	
Required majority →	116 out of 230	
Francisco Figueira (PPD/PSD)	193 / 230	check
Gabriel Mithá Ribeiro (CH)	131 / 230	check
Joana Ferreira Lima (PS)	183 / 230	check
Germana Rocha (PPD/PSD)	192 / 230	check
Absentees	0 / 230	
Sources: Assembleia da República

Gabriel Mithá Ribeiro resigned from Parliament on 22 September 2025, citing disagreements with the leadership of the party. On 26 September 2025, Chega proposed Francisco Gomes for Secretary, but he was rejected.

Election of the 2nd Secretary of the Assembly of the Republic
1st Ballot →	26 September 2025	
Required majority →	116 out of 230	
Francisco Gomes (CH)	98 / 230	X mark
Blank ballots	61 / 230	
Invalid ballots	18 / 230	
Absentees	53 / 230	
Sources: SIC Notícias

On 6 March 2026, Chega once again proposed a new name for the post, this time José de Carvalho. He ended up being elected.

Election of the 2nd Secretary of the Assembly of the Republic
2nd Ballot →	6 March 2026	
Required majority →	116 out of 230	
José de Carvalho (CH)	123 / 230	check
Blank ballots	48 / 230	
Invalid ballots	30 / 230	
Absentees	29 / 230	
Sources: Observador

=== Deputy Secretaries of the Assembly of the Republic ===
Election of the Secretaries of the Assembly of the Republic
1st Ballot →	3 June 2025	
Required majority →	116 out of 230	
Sandra Pereira (PPD/PSD)	194 / 230	check
Filipe Melo (CH)	113 / 230	X mark
Susana Correia (PS)	129 / 230	check
Gonçalo Valente (PPD/PSD)	133 / 230	check
Absentees	0 / 230	
Sources: Assembleia da República

Filipe Melo, the proposed name from Chega for Deputy Secretary, was rejected. As such, a second ballot was held on 17 June 2025, where he was elected.

Election of the 2nd Deputy Secretary of the Assembly of the Republic
2nd Ballot →	17 June 2025	
Required majority →	116 out of 230	
Filipe Melo (CH)	126 / 230	check
Blank ballots	91 / 230	
Invalid ballots	12 / 230	
Absentees	1 / 230	
Sources: SIC Notícias

== Parliamentary committees ==
=== Permanent committees ===
Committee	Chair		Vice-chairs	
Constitutional Affairs, Rights, Freedoms and Guarantees	Paula Cardoso	PSD	Idalina Durães	CH
Constitutional Affairs, Rights, Freedoms and Guarantees	Paula Cardoso	PSD	André Rijo	PS
Foreign Affairs and Portuguese Communities	José Cesário	PSD	Elza Pais	PS
Foreign Affairs and Portuguese Communities	José Cesário	PSD	João Tilly	CH
National Defence	Pedro Pessanha	CH	Pedro Roque	PSD
National Defence	Pedro Pessanha	CH	Patrícia Faro	PS
European Affairs	Edite Estrela	PS	Ricardo Carvalho	PSD
European Affairs	Edite Estrela	PS	José Dias Fernandes	CH
Budget and Finance	Rui Afonso	CH	Pedro Coelho	PSD
Budget and Finance	Rui Afonso	CH	Carlos João Pereira	PS
Economy and Territorial Cohesion	Pedro Coimbra	PS	Francisco Figueira	PSD
Economy and Territorial Cohesion	Pedro Coimbra	PS	Pedro Tavares dos Santos	CH
Agriculture and Fishing	Maurício Marques	PSD	João Paulo Graça	CH
Agriculture and Fishing	Maurício Marques	PSD	Mário Amorim Lopes	IL
Education and Science	Manuela Tender	CH	Célia Freire	PSD
Education and Science	Manuela Tender	CH	Paula Santos	PCP
Health	Filipe Neto Brandão	PS	Alberto Machado	PSD
Health	Filipe Neto Brandão	PS	Joana Cordeiro	IL
Labour, Social Security and Inclusion	Tiago Barbosa Ribeiro	PS	Joaquim Barbosa	PSD
Labour, Social Security and Inclusion	Tiago Barbosa Ribeiro	PS	Armando Grave	CH
Environment and Energy	Hugo Patrício Oliveira	PSD	Raul Melo	CH
Environment and Energy	Hugo Patrício Oliveira	PSD	Jorge Pinto	L
Culture, Communication, Youth and Sports	Paulo Cavaleiro	PSD	Davide Amado	PS
Culture, Communication, Youth and Sports	Paulo Cavaleiro	PSD	Filipa Pinto	L
State Reform and Local government	Almiro Moreira	PSD	João Ribeiro	CH
State Reform and Local government	Almiro Moreira	PSD	Eurídice Pereira	PS
Infrastructure, Mobility and Housing	Miguel Santos	PSD	André Pinotes Batista	PS
Infrastructure, Mobility and Housing	Miguel Santos	PSD	Paulo Núncio	CDS–PP
Transparency and Deputy's statutes	Rui Paulo Sousa	CH	Isabel Moreira	PS
Transparency and Deputy's statutes	Rui Paulo Sousa	CH	Hugo Carneiro	PSD

=== Parliamentary inquiry committees ===
Committee	Establishment	Disestablishment	Chair		Vice-chairs	
On the National Institute for Medical Emergencies	18 September 2025	present	Marta Martins da Silva	CH	Francisco Pimentel	PSD
On the National Institute for Medical Emergencies	18 September 2025	present	Marta Martins da Silva	CH	Marina Gonçalves	PS
On businesses during Rural Fires	11 December 2025	present	Maria José Aguiar	CH	Rui Santos	PS
On businesses during Rural Fires	11 December 2025	present	Maria José Aguiar	CH	Fernando Queiroga	PSD

=== Other parliamentary committees ===
Committee	Establishment	Disestablishment	Chair		Vice-chairs	
For National Resilience, Prevention of Natural Catastrophes and accompanying of the PTRR	26 May 2026	present	Hugo Costa	PS	José Barreira Soares	CH
For National Resilience, Prevention of Natural Catastrophes and accompanying of the PTRR	26 May 2026	present	Hugo Costa	PS	Dulcineia Moura	PSD
