= 16th Legislature of the Third Portuguese Republic =

Meeting of legislative body in Portugal

| ← | 15th Legislature | 17th Legislature | → |

Overview
- Legislative body: Assembly of the Republic
- Jurisdiction: Portugal
- Meeting place: Palace of Saint Benedict
- Term: 26 March 2024 – 2 June 2025
- Election: 10 March 2024
- Government: XXIV Constitutional Government
- Website: parlamento.pt

Deputies
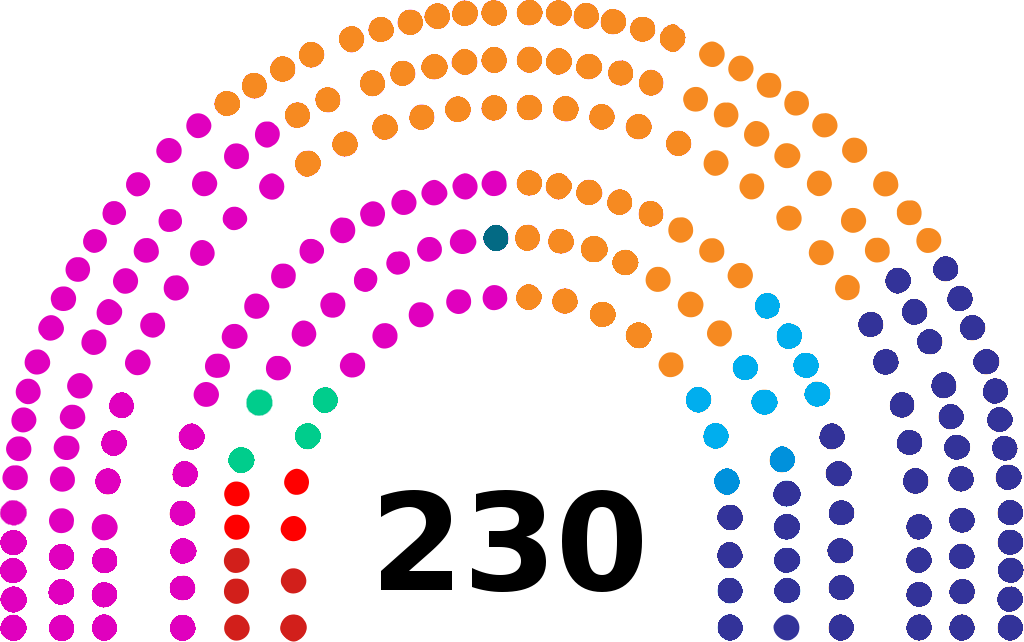
- Members: 230
- President: José Pedro Aguiar-Branco, PPD/PSD
- First Vice-President: Teresa Morais, PPD/PSD
- Second Vice-President: Marcos Perestrello, PS
- Third Vice-President: Diogo Pacheco de Amorim, CH
- Fourth Vice-President: Rodrigo Saraiva, IL
- First Secretary: Jorge Paulo Oliveira, PPD/PSD
- Second Secretary: Joana Ferreira Lima, PS
- Third Secretary: Gabriel Mithá Ribeiro, CH
- Fourth Secretary: Germana Rocha, PPD/PSD

The 16th Legislature of the Third Portuguese Republic (Portuguese: XVI Legislatura da Terceira República Portuguesa) was a meeting of the Assembly of the Republic, the legislative body of Portugal. It convened on 26 March 2024, with its membership determined by the results of the 2024 Portuguese legislative election held the previous 10 March.

On 11 March 2025, Luís Montenegro's government lost a vote of confidence and fell. On 13 March 2025, the President of the Republic, Marcelo Rebelo de Sousa, announced the dissolution of the 16th Legislature and called for a snap election for 18 May 2025. The Assembly of the Republic was officially dissolved on 20 March 2025. The Legislature ended on 2 June 2025; it was the shortest of the Third Portuguese Republic.

== Election ==
The 17th Portuguese legislative election was held on 10 March 2024. The Democratic Alliance (AD) won, narrowly, the most votes and seats.

| Party | Assembly of the Republic | | | |
| Party | Votes | % | Seats | +/− |
|---|---|---|---|---|
| AD (Note: Sum of the votes of the Democratic Alliance (AD) in mainland Portugal and the Azores with the Social Democratic Party/CDS – People's Party (PPD/PSD.CDS–PP) coalition in Madeira and the PPM sole list also in Madeira. The 3 MPs elected in the Madeira coalition are all from PPD/PSD.) | 1,867,442 | 28.84 | 80 | +3 |
| PS | 1,812,443 | 27.98 | 78 | –42 |
| Chega | 1,169,781 | 18.06 | 50 | +38 |
| IL | 319,877 | 4.94 | 8 | ±0 |
| BE | 282,314 | 4.36 | 5 | ±0 |
| CDU | 205,551 | 3.17 | 4 | –2 |
| Livre | 204,875 | 3.16 | 4 | +3 |
| PAN | 126,125 | 1.95 | 1 | ±0 |
| Other/blank/invalid | 488,544 | 7.54 | 0 | ±0 |
| Total | 6,476,952 | 100.00 | 230 | ±0 |

== Composition (2024–present) ==
=== Current composition ===
| Party | Parliamentary leader | Elected | | Dissolution | |
| Party | Parliamentary leader | Seats | % | Seats | % |
|---|---|---|---|---|---|
| PPD/PSD | Hugo Soares (Braga) | 78 | 33.9 | 78 | 33.9 |
| PS | Alexandra Leitão (Santarém) | 78 | 33.9 | 78 | 33.9 |
| Chega | Pedro Pinto (Faro) | 50 | 21.7 | 49 | 21.3 |
| IL | Mariana Leitão (Lisbon) | 8 | 3.5 | 8 | 3.5 |
| BE | Fabian Figueiredo (Lisbon) | 5 | 2.2 | 5 | 2.2 |
| PCP | Paula Santos (Setúbal) | 4 | 1.7 | 4 | 1.7 |
| Livre | Isabel Mendes Lopes (Lisbon) | 4 | 1.7 | 4 | 1.7 |
| CDS–PP | Paulo Núncio (Lisbon) | 2 | 0.9 | 2 | 0.9 |
| PAN | Inês Sousa Real (Lisbon) | 1 | 0.4 | 1 | 0.4 |
| Independent | Miguel Arruda (Azores) | 0 | 0.0 | 1 | 0.4 |
| Total | | 230 | 100.0 | 230 | 100.0 |

==== Changes ====
- Miguel Arruda, Chega (CH) → non-attached: Left the party following an accusation, and a police investigation, that he allegedly stole several suitcases at Lisbon and Ponta Delgada airports.

== Election for President of the Assembly of the Republic ==
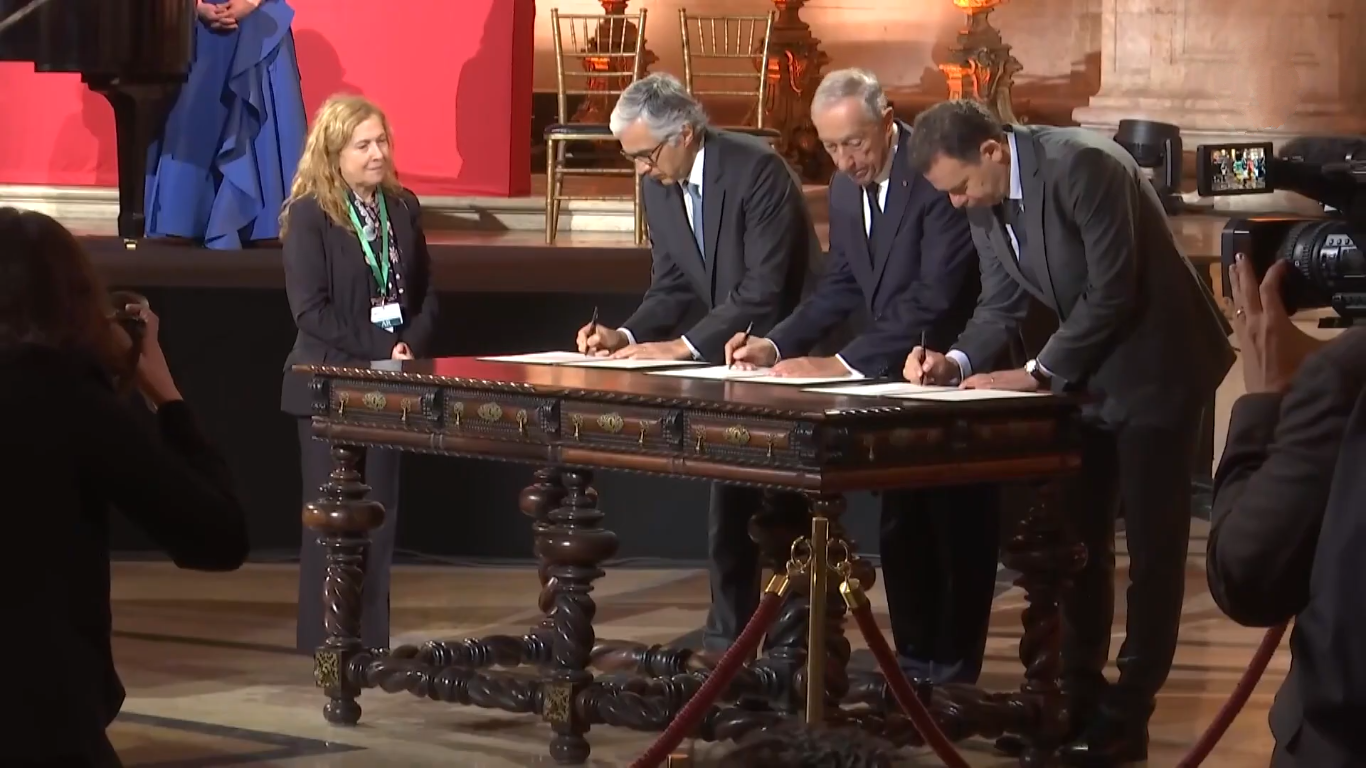
President of the Assembly of the Republic José Pedro Aguiar-Branco, President Marcelo Rebelo de Sousa and Prime Minister Luís Montenegro in January 2025

The election to pick a new President of the Assembly of the Republic was complicated. The Social Democratic Party (PSD) proposed José Pedro Aguiar-Branco as their candidate for President. To be elected, a candidate needs to reach a minimum of 116 votes. The first ballot occurred on 26 March 2024 and before the vote, there was the announcement that the Social Democratic Party reached an understanding with Chega regarding names. Chega leader André Ventura announced the "deal" to the media, but several Democratic Alliance members downplayed the announcement and said no deal was made, just an understanding. Despite this, the overwhelming point of view was that Aguiar-Branco would easily be elected, but on the first ballot, Chega members voted in blank and Aguiar-Branco failed to be elected:

Election of the President of the Assembly of the Republic
| 1st Ballot → | 26 March 2024 | |
| Required majority → | 116 out of 230 | |
| José Pedro Aguiar-Branco (PPD/PSD) | 89 / 230 | X mark |
| Blank ballots | 134 / 230 | |
| Invalid ballots | 7 / 230 | |
| Absentees | 0 / 230 | |

Following the first ballot, the PSD accused the Socialist Party (PS) and Chega of a "negative coalition" and announced the withdraw of Aguiar-Branco. The PS then announced they would present Francisco Assis as candidate, while Chega would present Manuela Tender. Shortly after, Aguiar-Branco retracted his earlier withdraw and was back on the ballot. On the two following ballots, the gridlock remained:

Election of the President of the Assembly of the Republic
| 2nd Ballot → | 26 March 2024 | |
| Required majority → | 116 out of 230 | |
| Francisco Assis (PS) | 90 / 230 | X mark |
| José Pedro Aguiar-Branco (PPD/PSD) | 88 / 230 | X mark |
| Manuela Tender (Chega) | 49 / 230 | X mark |
| Blank ballots | 2 / 230 | |
| Invalid ballots | 0 / 230 | |
| Absentees | 1 / 230 | |

Election of the President of the Assembly of the Republic
| 3rd Ballot → | 26 March 2024 | |
| Required majority → | 116 out of 230 | |
| Francisco Assis (PS) | 90 / 230 | X mark |
| José Pedro Aguiar-Branco (PPD/PSD) | 88 / 230 | X mark |
| Blank ballots | 52 / 230 | |
| Invalid ballots | 0 / 230 | |
| Absentees | 0 / 230 | |

A fourth ballot was then scheduled for the following day, 27 March, to be held at noon, but late negotiations between PS and PSD delayed the vote for several hours. Following these negotiations, it was announced that both parties reached a deal in which the Presidency of the Assembly would rotate between the two parties, with the PSD holding the first two years, until 2026, and the PS the rest of the legislature until 2028 (which did not materialize, as the legislature was dissolved in March 2025). The PSD presented again Aguiar-Branco, while Chega presented Rui Paulo Sousa. Aguiar-Branco was easily elected:

Election of the President of the Assembly of the Republic
| 4th Ballot → | 27 March 2024 | |
| Required majority → | 116 out of 230 | |
| José Pedro Aguiar-Branco (PPD/PSD) | 160 / 230 | check |
| Rui Paulo Sousa (Chega) | 50 / 230 | X mark |
| Blank ballots | 18 / 230 | |
| Invalid ballots | 0 / 230 | |
| Absentees | 2 / 230 | |

== Other elections for the bureau of the Assembly of the Republic ==
=== Vice Presidents of the Assembly of the Republic ===
The election of four new Vice Presidents of the Assembly of the Republic were held in the second session of the new Legislature. All designated candidates were elected to their positions.

Election of the Vice Presidents of the Assembly of the Republic
| 1st Ballot → | 27 March 2024 | |
| Required majority → | 116 out of 230 | |
| Teresa Morais (PPD/PSD) | 140 / 230 | check |
| Marcos Perestrello (PS) | 169 / 230 | check |
| Diogo Pacheco de Amorim (CH) | 129 / 230 | check |
| Rodrigo Saraiva (IL) | 144 / 230 | check |
| Absentees | 3 / 230 | |
Sources: Executive Digest

=== Secretaries of the Assembly of the Republic ===
Election of the Secretaries of the Assembly of the Republic
| 1st Ballot → | 27 March 2024 | |
| Required majority → | 116 out of 230 | |
| Jorge Paulo Oliveira (PPD/PSD) | 149 / 230 | check |
| Joana Ferreira Lima (PS) | 167 / 230 | check |
| Gabriel Mithá Ribeiro (CH) | 130 / 230 | check |
| Germana Rocha (PPD/PSD) | 147 / 230 | check |
| Absentees | 3 / 230 | |
Sources: Assembleia da República

=== Deputy Secretaries of the Assembly of the Republic ===
Election of the Deputy Secretaries of the Assembly of the Republic
| 1st Ballot → | 27 March 2024 | |
| Required majority → | 116 out of 230 | |
| Sandra Pereira (PPD/PSD) | 146 / 230 | check |
| Susana Correia (PS) | 170 / 230 | check |
| Filipe Melo (CH) | 129 / 230 | check |
| Palmira Maciel (PS) | 170 / 230 | check |
| Absentees | 3 / 230 | |
Sources: Assembleia da República

== Parliamentary committees ==
=== Permanent committees ===
| Committee | Chair | | Vice-chairs | |
|---|---|---|---|---|
| Constitutional Affairs, Rights, Freedoms and Guarantees | Paula Cardoso | PSD | Manuel Magno | CH |
| Constitutional Affairs, Rights, Freedoms and Guarantees | Paula Cardoso | PSD | Cláudia Cruz Santos | PS |
| Foreign Affairs and Portuguese Communities | Sérgio Sousa Pinto | PS | Carlos Eduardo Reis | PSD |
| Foreign Affairs and Portuguese Communities | Sérgio Sousa Pinto | PS | Rodrigo Saraiva | IL |
| National Defence | Pedro Pessanha | CH | Liliana Reis | PSD |
| National Defence | Pedro Pessanha | CH | José Maria Costa | PS |
| European Affairs | Telmo Faria | PSD | Marta Temido | PS |
| European Affairs | Telmo Faria | PSD | Rui Tavares | L |
| Budget and Finance | Filipe Neto Brandão | PS | Pedro Coelho | PSD |
| Budget and Finance | Filipe Neto Brandão | PS | Paulo Núncio | CDS–PP |
| Economy, Public Works, Planning and Housing | Miguel Santos | PSD | Pedro Coimbra | PS |
| Economy, Public Works, Planning and Housing | Miguel Santos | PSD | Carlos Guimarães Pinto | IL |
| Agriculture and Fishing | Emília Cerqueira | PSD | João Paulo Graça | CH |
| Agriculture and Fishing | Emília Cerqueira | PSD | Clarisse Campos | PS |
| Education and Science | Manuela Tender | CH | Germana Rocha | PSD |
| Education and Science | Manuela Tender | CH | Eduardo Pinheiro | PS |
| Health | Ana Abrunhosa | PS | Marta Martins da Silva | CH |
| Health | Ana Abrunhosa | PS | Ana Isabel Moreira | PSD |
| Labour, Social Security and Inclusion | Eurico Brilhante Dias | PS | Pedro Roque | PSD |
| Labour, Social Security and Inclusion | Eurico Brilhante Dias | PS | José Soeiro | BE |
| Environment and Energy | Salvador Malheiro | PSD | Rita Matias | CH |
| Environment and Energy | Salvador Malheiro | PSD | Pedro Vaz | PS |
| Culture, Communication, Youth and Sports | Edite Estrela | PS | Jorge Valsassina Galveias | CH |
| Culture, Communication, Youth and Sports | Edite Estrela | PS | António Filipe | PCP |
| Local government and State Reform | Bruno Nunes | CH | Carlos Silva Santiago | PSD |
| Local government and State Reform | Bruno Nunes | CH | João Azevedo | PS |
| Transparency and Deputy's statutes | Ofélia Ramos | PSD | Rui Paulo Sousa | CH |
| Transparency and Deputy's statutes | Ofélia Ramos | PSD | Isabel Oneto | PS |

=== Parliamentary inquiry committees ===
| Committee | Establishment | Disestablishment | Chair | | Vice-chairs | |
|---|---|---|---|---|---|---|
| Verifying the legality and conduct of the political representatives allegedly envolved in the healthcare provision to two twin sisters treated with the medicine Zolgensma | 22 May 2024 | 2 June 2025 | Rui Paulo Sousa | CH | Ana Santos | PSD |
| Verifying the legality and conduct of the political representatives allegedly envolved in the healthcare provision to two twin sisters treated with the medicine Zolgensma | 22 May 2024 | 2 June 2025 | Rui Paulo Sousa | CH | Jorge Botelho | PS |
| On Santa Casa da Misericórdia de Lisboa | 18 September 2024 | 2 June 2025 | Tiago Barbosa Ribeiro | PS | Felicidade Vital | CH |
| On Santa Casa da Misericórdia de Lisboa | 18 September 2024 | 2 June 2025 | Tiago Barbosa Ribeiro | PS | Maurício Marques | PSD |
| On the political guardianship of the management of the EFACEC group | 15 January 2025 | 2 June 2025 | Nuno Simões de Melo | CH | Alexandre Poço | PSD |
| On the political guardianship of the management of the EFACEC group | 15 January 2025 | 2 June 2025 | Nuno Simões de Melo | CH | Hugo Costa | PS |

=== Other parliamentary committees ===
| Committee | Establishment | Disestablishment | Chair | | Vice-chairs | |
|---|---|---|---|---|---|---|
| Of Verification of the Powers of the Elected Deputies | 26 March 2024 | 11 April 2024 | Jorge Paulo Oliveira | PSD | Eurídice Pereira | PS |
| Of Verification of the Powers of the Elected Deputies | 26 March 2024 | 11 April 2024 | Jorge Paulo Oliveira | PSD | Bruno Nunes | CH |
| Of Accompanying the execution of the PRR and PT2030 | 19 September 2024 | 2 June 2025 | Dulcineia Moura | PSD | Ana Mendes Godinho | PS |
| Of Accompanying the execution of the PRR and PT2030 | 19 September 2024 | 2 June 2025 | Dulcineia Moura | PSD | Carlos Guimarães Pinto | IL |
| For the integrate accompanying of the execution and monitoring of the Anticorruption Agenda | 18 October 2024 | 2 June 2025 | Cláudia Cruz Santos | PS | Cristina Rodrigues | CH |
| For the integrate accompanying of the execution and monitoring of the Anticorruption Agenda | 18 October 2024 | 2 June 2025 | Cláudia Cruz Santos | PS | Vacant | |
| To evaluate the system of Civil Protection and the Prevention and Fight to the 2024 Wildfires | 16 January 2025 | 2 June 2025 | Maurício Marques | PSD | Eurídice Pereira | PS |
| To evaluate the system of Civil Protection and the Prevention and Fight to the 2024 Wildfires | 16 January 2025 | 2 June 2025 | Maurício Marques | PSD | Isabel Pires | BE |
