= 15th Legislature of the Third Portuguese Republic =

←	14th Legislature	16th Legislature	→

Overview
- Legislative body: Assembly of the Republic
- Jurisdiction: Portugal
- Meeting place: Palace of Saint Benedict
- Term: 29 March 2022 – 25 March 2024
- Election: 30 January 2022
- Government: XXIII Constitutional Government
- Website: parlamento.pt

Deputies
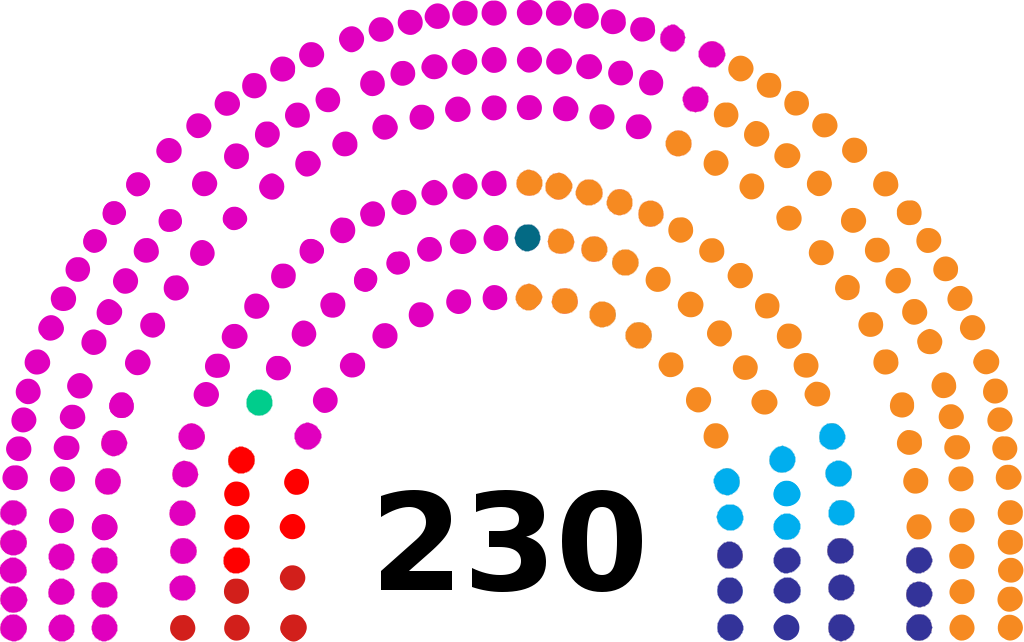
- Members: 230
- President: Augusto Santos Silva (PS)
- First Vice-President: Edite Estrela (PS)
- Second Vice-President: Adão Silva (PPD/PSD)
- Third Vice-President: Vacant
- Fourth Vice-President: Vacant
- First Secretary: Maria da Luz Rosinha (PS)
- Second Secretary: Duarte Pacheco (PPD/PSD)
- Third Secretary: Palmira Maciel (PS)
- Fourth Secretary: Lina Lopes (PPD/PSD)

The 15th Legislature of the Third Portuguese Republic (Portuguese: XV Legislatura da Terceira República Portuguesa) was a meeting of the Assembly of the Republic, the legislative body of Portugal. It convened on 29 March 2022, with its membership determined by the results of the 2022 Portuguese legislative election held the previous 30 January.

On 9 November 2023, the President of the Republic Marcelo Rebelo de Sousa announced the dissolution of the 15th Legislature, following the resignation of Prime Minister António Costa due to the Operation Influencer corruption investigation, and called for a snap election for 10 March 2024. The Assembly of the Republic was officially dissolved on 15 January 2024. The Legislature ended on 25 March 2024.

== Election ==
The 16th Portuguese legislative election was held on 30 January 2022. The Socialist Party (PS) remained as the largest party and achieved a surprise absolute majority.

For the first time since they had been founded, both CDS – People's Party and Ecologist Party "The Greens" did not earn a single seat.

Party	Assembly of the Republic			
Party	Votes	%	Seats	+/−
PS	2,302,601	41.38	120	+12
PPD/PSD (Note: Sum of the votes of the Social Democratic Party (PPD/PSD) in mainland Portugal and the PPD/PSD.CDS – People's Party (CDS–PP) coalitions in Azores and Madeira. The 5 MPs elected in these coalitions are all from the PSD.)	1,618,381	29.08	77	–2
Chega	399,659	7.18	12	+11
IL	273,687	4.92	8	+7
CDU	238,920	4.29	6	–6
BE	244,603	4.40	5	–14
PAN	88,152	1.58	1	–3
Livre	71,232	1.28	1	±0
CDS–PP	89,181	1.60	0	–5
Other/blank/invalid	238,123	4.28	0	±0
Total	5,564,539	100.00	230	±0

== Composition (2022–2024) ==
=== Composition ===
Party	Parliamentary leader	Elected		Dissolution	
Party	Parliamentary leader	Seats	%	Seats	%
PS	Eurico Brilhante Dias (Leiria)	120	52.2	120	52.2
PPD/PSD	Paulo Mota Pinto (Leiria) (2022); Joaquim Miranda Sarmento (Lisbon) (2022–2024)	77	33.5	75	32.6
Chega	Pedro Pinto (Faro)	12	5.2	12	5.2
IL	Rodrigo Saraiva (Lisbon)	8	3.5	8	3.5
PCP	Paula Santos (Setúbal)	6	2.6	6	2.6
BE	Pedro Filipe Soares (Lisbon)	5	2.2	5	2.2
PAN	Inês Sousa Real (Lisbon)	1	0.4	1	0.4
Livre	Rui Tavares (Lisbon)	1	0.4	1	0.4
Non-attached	António Maló de Abreu (Outside Europe); Rui Cristina (Faro)	0	0.0	2	0.9
Total		230	100.0	230	100.0

==== Changes ====
- António Maló de Abreu, Social Democratic Party (PPD/PSD) → Non-attached: Left the PSD citing deep disagreements with the leadership and that the party elections prospects were bad.
- Rui Cristina, Social Democratic Party (PPD/PSD) → Non-attached: Also left the party, after the party's leadership put him in an unelectable spot on the lists.

== Election for President of the Assembly of the Republic ==
Following President of the Assembly Eduardo Ferro Rodrigues' decision of not contesting the 2022 legislative election, the Socialist Party (PS) nominated Augusto Santos Silva as their candidate for President of the Assembly of the Republic. To be elected, a candidate needs to reach a minimum of 116 votes. Santos Silva was easily elected:

Election of the President of the Assembly of the Republic
Ballot →	29 March 2022	
Required majority →	116 out of 230	
Augusto Santos Silva (PS)	156 / 230	check
Blank ballots	63 / 230	
Invalid ballots	11 / 230	
Absentees	0 / 230	
Sources: CNN Portugal

== Other elections for the bureau of the Assembly of the Republic ==
=== Vice Presidents of the Assembly of the Republic ===
The election of four new Vice Presidents of the Assembly of the Republic were held in the second session of the new Legislature. The candidates for third and fourth Vice Presidents, designated by Chega and the Liberal Initiative, were both rejected in the first ballot.

Election of the Vice Presidents of the Assembly of the Republic
1st Ballot →	31 March 2022	
Required majority →	116 out of 230	
Edite Estrela (PS)	159 / 230	check
Adão Silva (PPD/PSD)	190 / 230	check
Diogo Pacheco de Amorim (CH)	35 / 230	X mark
João Cotrim de Figueiredo (IL)	108 / 230	X mark
Absentees	6 / 230	
Sources: Observador

The Liberal Initiative announced they weren't presenting any other candidate until the end of the legislature, while Chega presented another candidate in the same day, Gabriel Mithá Ribeiro, which was also overwhelmingly rejected.

Election of the 2nd Vice President of the Assembly of the Republic
2nd Ballot →	31 March 2022	
Required majority →	116 out of 230	
Gabriel Mithá Ribeiro (CH)	37 / 230	X mark
Blank ballots	177 / 230	
Invalid ballots	11 / 230	
Absentees	5 / 230	
Sources: Observador

On 22 September 2022, Chega once again presented another candidate for Vice President of Parliament, Rui Paulo Sousa, with the Social Democratic Party's parliamentary leader, Joaquim Miranda Sarmento, recommending the vote of the caucus on Chega's candidate. Despite that, Chega's candidate was once again rejected, failing even to guarantee the votes of both parties.

Election of the 2nd Vice President of the Assembly of the Republic
3rd Ballot →	22 September 2022	
Required majority →	116 out of 230	
Rui Paulo Sousa (CH)	64 / 230	X mark
Blank ballots	137 / 230	
Invalid ballots	12 / 230	
Absentees	17 / 230	
Sources: CNN Portugal

On 16 March 2023, Chega proposed once again a new name for Vice President of Parliament, Jorge Valsassina Galveias, who was also rejected.

Election of the 2nd Vice President of the Assembly of the Republic
4th Ballot →	16 March 2023	
Required majority →	116 out of 230	
Jorge Valsassina Galveias (CH)	58 / 230	X mark
Blank ballots	112 / 230	
Invalid ballots	28 / 230	
Absentees	32 / 230	
Sources: Diário de Notícias

=== Secretaries of the Assembly of the Republic ===
Election of the Secretaries of the Assembly of the Republic
1st Ballot →	31 March 2022	
Required majority →	116 out of 230	
Maria da Luz Rosinha (PS)	178 / 230	check
Duarte Pacheco (PPD/PSD)	196 / 230	check
Palmira Maciel (PS)	172 / 230	check
Lina Lopes (PPD/PSD)	180 / 230	check
Absentees	6 / 230	
Sources: Assembleia da República

=== Deputy Secretaries of the Assembly of the Republic ===
Election of the Deputy Secretaries of the Assembly of the Republic
1st Ballot →	31 March 2022	
Required majority →	116 out of 230	
Diogo Leão (PS)	176 / 230	check
Helga Correia (PPD/PSD)	178 / 230	check
Joana Sá Pereira (PS)	175 / 230	check
Tiago Estêvão Martins (PPD/PSD)	160 / 230	check
Absentees	6 / 230	
Sources: Assembleia da República

== Parliamentary committees ==
=== Permanent committees ===
Committee	Chair		Vice-chairs	
Constitutional Affairs, Rights, Freedoms and Guarantees	Fernando Negrão	PSD	Cláudia Cruz Santos	PS
Constitutional Affairs, Rights, Freedoms and Guarantees	Fernando Negrão	PSD	Pedro Pinto	CH
Foreign Affairs and Portuguese Communities	Sérgio Sousa Pinto	PS	Olga Silvestre	PSD
Foreign Affairs and Portuguese Communities	Sérgio Sousa Pinto	PS	Diogo Pacheco de Amorim	CH
National Defence	Marcos Perestrello	PS	António Prôa	PSD
National Defence	Marcos Perestrello	PS	Patrícia Gilvaz	IL
European Affairs	Luís Capoulas Santos	PS	Clara Marques Mendes	PSD
European Affairs	Luís Capoulas Santos	PS	Bernardo Blanco	IL
Budget and Finance	Filipe Neto Brandão	PS	Hugo Carneiro	PSD
Budget and Finance	Filipe Neto Brandão	PS	Rui Afonso	CH
Economy, Public Works, Planning and Housing	Afonso Oliveira	PSD	Pedro Coimbra	PS
Economy, Public Works, Planning and Housing	Afonso Oliveira	PSD	Carlos Guimarães Pinto	IL
Agriculture and Fishing	Pedro do Carmo	PS	Artur Soveral Andrade	PSD
Agriculture and Fishing	Pedro do Carmo	PS	Pedro Frazão	CH
Education and Science	Alexandre Quintanilha	PS	Germana Rocha	PSD
Education and Science	Alexandre Quintanilha	PS	Carla Castro	IL
Health	António Maló de Abreu	PSD	Jorge Seguro Sanches	PS
Health	António Maló de Abreu	PSD	João Dias	PCP
Labour, Social Security and Inclusion	Isabel Meirelles	PSD	Ana Bernardo	PS
Labour, Social Security and Inclusion	Isabel Meirelles	PSD	Diana Ferreira	PCP
Environment and Energy	Tiago Brandão Rodrigues	PS	Hugo Patrício Oliveira	PSD
Environment and Energy	Tiago Brandão Rodrigues	PS	Pedro Filipe Soares	BE
Culture, Communication, Youth and Sports	Luís Graça	PS	Cláudia Bento	PSD
Culture, Communication, Youth and Sports	Luís Graça	PS	Joana Mortágua	BE
Public Administration, Territorial Organization and Local government	Isaura Morais	PSD	João Azevedo	PS
Public Administration, Territorial Organization and Local government	Isaura Morais	PSD	Bruno Nunes	CH
Transparency and Deputy's statutes	Alexandra Leitão	PS	Rui Cruz	PSD
Transparency and Deputy's statutes	Alexandra Leitão	PS	Rui Paulo Sousa	CH

=== Parliamentary inquiry committees ===
Committee	Establishment	Disestablishment	Chair		Vice-chairs	
On the political guardianship of the management of TAP	22 February 2023	19 July 2023	António Lacerda Sales	PS	Paulo Rios de Oliveira	PSD
On the political guardianship of the management of TAP	22 February 2023	19 July 2023	António Lacerda Sales	PS	Filipe Melo	CH

=== Other parliamentary committees ===
Committee	Establishment	Disestablishment	Chair		Vice-chairs	
Of Verification of the Powers of the Elected Deputies	29 March 2022	12 April 2022	Filipe Neto Brandão	PS	Mónica Quintela	PSD
Of Verification of the Powers of the Elected Deputies	29 March 2022	12 April 2022	Filipe Neto Brandão	PS	Bruno Nunes	CH
For the Constitutional Revision	4 January 2023	25 March 2024	José Silvano	PSD	Marta Temido	PS
For the Constitutional Revision	4 January 2023	25 March 2024	José Silvano	PSD	Alma Rivera	PCP
