= Aveiro (Assembly of the Republic constituency) =

Constituency of the Assembly of the Republic, the national legislature of Portugal

- Constituency for the Assembly of the Republic
- Location of Aveiro within Portugal
- District: Aveiro
- Population: 734,762 (2024)
- Electorate: 642,045 (2025)
- Area: 2,801 km^{2} (2024)

Current Constituency
- Created: 1976
- Seats: List: 16 (2009–present); 15 (1999–2009); 14 (1991–1999); 15 (1976–1991)
- Deputies: List: Maria José Aguiar (CH); Filipe Neto Brandão (PS); Paula Cardoso (PSD); Paulo Cavaleiro (PSD); Helga Correia (PSD); Susana Correia (PS); Firmino Ferreira (PSD); Lia Ferreira (PS); Pedro Frazão (CH); Armando Grave (CH); Mário Amorim Lopes (IL); Carolina Marques (PSD); Almiro Moreira (PSD); Hugo Oliveira (PS); Adriana Rodrigues (PSD); Pedro Tavares (CH)

Aveiro is one of the 22 multi-member constituencies of the Assembly of the Republic, the national legislature of Portugal. The constituency was established in 1976 when the Assembly of the Republic was established by the constitution following the restoration of democracy. It is conterminous with the district of Aveiro. The constituency currently elects 16 of the 230 members of the Assembly of the Republic using the closed party-list proportional representation electoral system. At the 2025 legislative election it had 642,045 registered electors.

== Electoral system ==
Aveiro currently elects 16 of the 230 members of the Assembly of the Republic using the closed party-list proportional representation electoral system. Seats are allocated using the D'Hondt method.

== Election results ==
=== Summary ===
Election	Unitary Democrats CDU / APU / PCP			Left Bloc BE / UDP			LIVRE L			Socialists PS / FRS			People Animals Nature PAN			Democratic Renewal PRD			Social Democrats PSD / PàF / AD / PPD			Liberals IL			CDS – People's CDS–PP / CDS			Chega CH / PPV/CDC / PPV		
Election	Votes	%	Seats	Votes	%	Seats	Votes	%	Seats	Votes	%	Seats	Votes	%	Seats	Votes	%	Seats	Votes	%	Seats	Votes	%	Seats	Votes	%	Seats	Votes	%	Seats
2025	4,924	1.22%	0	7,028	1.74%	0	12,752	3.16%	0	90,030	22.29%	4	5,134	1.27%	0				163,669	40.52%	7	23,452	5.81%	1				85,834	21.25%	4
2024	5,829	1.41%	0	17,383	4.22%	0	9,519	2.32%	0	117,369	28.48%	5	7,302	1.77%	0				148,861	36.12%	7	21,671	5.26%	1				73,122	17.74%	3
2022	6,560	1.84%	0	16,706	4.68%	0	2,883	0.81%	0	144,222	40.43%	8	4,606	1.29%	0				130,250	36.51%	7	16,294	4.57%	0	8,966	2.51%	0	20,570	5.77%	1
2019	10,742	3.20%	0	35,074	10.46%	2	2,410	0.72%	0	120,870	36.05%	7	10,442	3.11%	0				118,165	35.25%	6	3,566	1.06%	0	20,070	5.99%	1	2,601	0.78%	0
2015	16,051	4.54%	0	35,347	10.00%	1	1,659	0.47%	0	102,769	29.08%	5	3,630	1.03%	0				177,321	50.17%	10							802	0.23%	0
2011	15,729	4.27%	0	19,327	5.24%	1				99,652	27.04%	5	3,040	0.82%	0				170,869	46.36%	8				49,539	13.44%	2	720	0.20%	0
2009	14,985	3.96%	0	34,975	9.25%	1				131,693	34.82%	6							134,842	35.65%	7				50,663	13.39%	2	759	0.20%	0
2005	13,809	3.65%	0	19,846	5.24%	0				159,955	42.26%	8							139,109	36.75%	6				38,001	10.04%	1			
2002	9,554	2.66%	0	6,647	1.85%	0				122,606	34.07%	5							169,926	47.22%	8				47,131	13.10%	2			
1999	12,787	3.59%	0	4,677	1.31%	0				145,577	40.88%	7							138,717	38.96%	6				49,196	13.82%	2			
1995	10,522	2.79%	0	1,124	0.30%	0				154,396	40.92%	6							158,152	41.91%	6				48,383	12.82%	2			
1991	10,427	2.85%	0							103,308	28.27%	4				1,133	0.31%	0	217,615	59.56%	9				22,624	6.19%	1			
1987	15,784	4.50%	0	1,355	0.39%	0				81,675	23.31%	4				9,493	2.71%	0	215,540	61.52%	11				18,794	5.36%	0			
1985	22,735	6.61%	1	2,791	0.81%	0				80,849	23.50%	4				47,026	13.67%	2	135,247	39.31%	6				47,501	13.81%	2			
1983	23,963	7.18%	1	1,684	0.50%	0				125,035	37.49%	6							119,058	35.69%	6				56,115	16.82%	2			
1980	24,553	6.97%	1	2,674	0.76%	0				97,457	27.66%	4							211,408	60.00%	10									
1979	28,251	8.09%	1	4,148	1.19%	0				101,574	29.08%	5							202,837	58.07%	9									
1976	11,962	3.87%	0	2,955	0.96%	0				99,647	32.21%	5							113,595	36.72%	6				72,638	23.48%	4			

(Figures in italics represent alliances.)

=== Detailed ===
==== 2020s ====
===== 2025 =====
Results of the 2025 legislative election held on 18 May 2025:

Party		Votes	%	Seats
Democratic Alliance	AD	163,669	40.52%	7
Socialist Party	PS	90,030	22.29%	4
Chega	CH	85,834	21.25%	4
Liberal Initiative	IL	23,452	5.81%	1
LIVRE	L	12,752	3.16%	0
Left Bloc	BE	7,028	1.74%	0
National Democratic Alternative	ADN	6,989	1.73%	0
People Animals Nature	PAN	5,134	1.27%	0
Unitary Democratic Coalition	CDU	4,924	1.22%	0
Portuguese Workers' Communist Party	PCTP	1,008	0.25%	0
React, Include, Recycle	RIR	936	0.23%	0
Volt Portugal	Volt	580	0.14%	0
Ergue-te	E	525	0.13%	0
New Right	ND	472	0.12%	0
People's Monarchist Party	PPM	304	0.08%	0
We, the Citizens!	NC	289	0.07%	0
Valid votes		403,926	100.00%	16
Blank votes		6,649	1.60%	
Rejected votes – other		3,771	0.91%	
Total polled		414,346	64.54%	
Registered electors		642,045		

The following candidates were elected:: Maria José Aguiar (CH); Filipe Neto Brandão (PS); Paula Cardoso (AD); Susana Correia (PS); Pedro Frazão (CH); Armando Grave (CH); Mário Amorim Lopes (IL); Luís Montenegro (AD); Almiro Moreira (AD); Hugo Oliveira (PS); Silvério Regalado (AD); Adriana Rodrigues (AD); Pedro Nuno Santos (PS); Salvador Malheiro Ferreira da Silva (AD); Emídio Sousa (AD); and Pedro Tavares (CH).

===== 2024 =====
Results of the 2024 legislative election held on 10 March 2024:

Party		Votes	%	Seats
Democratic Alliance	AD	148,861	36.12%	7
Socialist Party	PS	117,369	28.48%	5
Chega	CH	73,122	17.74%	3
Liberal Initiative	IL	21,671	5.26%	1
Left Bloc	BE	17,383	4.22%	0
LIVRE	L	9,519	2.31%	0
People Animals Nature	PAN	7,302	1.77%	0
Unitary Democratic Coalition	CDU	5,829	1.41%	0
National Democratic Alternative	ADN	5,754	1.40%	0
React, Include, Recycle	RIR	1,924	0.47%	0
Portuguese Workers' Communist Party	PCTP	1,207	0.29%	0
New Right	ND	1,075	0.26%	0
Volt Portugal	Volt	611	0.15%	0
Ergue-te	E	344	0.08%	0
Alternative 21 (Earth Party and Alliance)	PT-A	205	0.05%	0
Valid votes		412,176	100.00%	16
Blank votes		7,030	1.66%	
Rejected votes – other		4,528	1.07%	
Total polled		423,734	65.99%	
Registered electors		642,086		

The following candidates were elected: Maria José Aguiar (CH); Ângela Almeida (AD); Filipe Neto Brandão (PS); Paula Cardoso (AD); Paulo Cavaleiro (AD); Susana Correia (PS); Jorge Galveias (CH); Armando Grave (CH); Mário Amorim Lopes (IL); Salvador Malheiro (AD); Almiro Moreira (AD); Hugo Oliveira (PS); Silvério Regalado (AD); Cláudia Santos (PS); Pedro Nuno Santos (PS); and Emídio Sousa (AD).

===== 2022 =====
Results of the 2022 legislative election held on 30 January 2022:

Party		Votes	%	Seats
Socialist Party	PS	144,222	40.43%	8
Social Democratic Party	PSD	130,250	36.51%	7
Chega	CH	20,570	5.77%	1
Left Bloc	BE	16,706	4.68%	0
Liberal Initiative	IL	16,294	4.57%	0
CDS – People's Party	CDS–PP	8,966	2.51%	0
Unitary Democratic Coalition	CDU	6,560	1.84%	0
People Animals Nature	PAN	4,606	1.29%	0
LIVRE	L	2,883	0.81%	0
React, Include, Recycle	RIR	1,822	0.51%	0
Portuguese Workers' Communist Party	PCTP	1,414	0.40%	0
National Democratic Alternative	ADN	677	0.19%	0
Earth Party	PT	491	0.14%	0
Volt Portugal	Volt	433	0.12%	0
Socialist Alternative Movement	MAS	403	0.11%	0
Ergue-te	E	217	0.06%	0
Together for the People	JPP	193	0.05%	0
Valid votes		356,707	100.00%	16
Blank votes		4,743	1.30%	
Rejected votes – other		3,425	0.94%	
Total polled		364,875	56.78%	
Registered electors		642,623		

The following candidates were elected: Bruno Aragão (PS); Filipe Neto Brandão (PS); Paula Cardoso (PSD); Helga Correia (PSD); Susana Correia (PS); Rui Cruz (PSD); Jorge Galveias (CH); António Topa Gomes (PSD); Carla Madureira (PSD); Hugo Oliveira (PS); Joana Sá Pereira (PS); Cláudia Santos (PS); Pedro Nuno Santos (PS); Porfírio Silva (PS); Ricardo Sousa (PSD); and Rui Vilar (PSD).

==== 2010s ====
===== 2019 =====
Results of the 2019 legislative election held on 6 October 2019:

Party		Votes	%	Seats
Socialist Party	PS	120,870	36.05%	7
Social Democratic Party	PSD	118,165	35.25%	6
Left Bloc	BE	35,074	10.46%	2
CDS – People's Party	CDS–PP	20,070	5.99%	1
Unitary Democratic Coalition	CDU	10,742	3.20%	0
People Animals Nature	PAN	10,442	3.11%	0
Liberal Initiative	IL	3,566	1.06%	0
React, Include, Recycle	RIR	2,750	0.82%	0
Chega	CH	2,601	0.78%	0
LIVRE	L	2,410	0.72%	0
Alliance	A	2,179	0.65%	0
Portuguese Workers' Communist Party	PCTP	1,892	0.56%	0
Earth Party	PT	715	0.21%	0
United Party of Retirees and Pensioners	PURP	701	0.21%	0
National Renewal Party	PNR	677	0.20%	0
We, the Citizens!	NC	622	0.19%	0
Democratic Republican Party	PDR	562	0.17%	0
Portuguese Labour Party	PTP	560	0.17%	0
People's Monarchist Party	PPM	390	0.12%	0
Together for the People	JPP	266	0.08%	0
Valid votes		335,254	100.00%	16
Blank votes		10,596	3.01%	
Rejected votes – other		6,243	1.77%	
Total polled		352,093	54.53%	
Registered electors		645,650		

The following candidates were elected: João Pinho de Almeida (CDS-PP); Filipe Neto Brandão (PS); Bruno Coimbra (PSD); Helga Correia (PSD); Susana Correia (PS); Moisés Ferreira (BE); Carla Madureira (PSD); André Neves (PSD); Hugo Oliveira (PS); Nelson Peralta (BE); Joana Sá Pereira (PS); Ana Miguel dos Santos (PSD); Cláudia Santos (PS); Pedro Nuno Santos (PS); Porfírio Silva (PS); and António Topa (PSD).

===== 2015 =====
Results of the 2015 legislative election held on 4 October 2015:

Party		Votes	%	Seats
Portugal Ahead	PàF	177,321	50.17%	10
Socialist Party	PS	102,769	29.08%	5
Left Bloc	BE	35,347	10.00%	1
Unitary Democratic Coalition	CDU	16,051	4.54%	0
Democratic Republican Party	PDR	4,799	1.36%	0
People Animals Nature	PAN	3,630	1.03%	0
Portuguese Workers' Communist Party	PCTP	3,387	0.96%	0
National Renewal Party	PNR	1,699	0.48%	0
LIVRE	L	1,659	0.47%	0
The Earth Party Movement	MPT	1,328	0.38%	0
People's Monarchist Party	PPM	1,298	0.37%	0
ACT! (Portuguese Labour Party and Socialist Alternative Movement)	AGIR	1,270	0.36%	0
We, the Citizens!	NC	1,009	0.29%	0
Citizenship and Christian Democracy	PPV/CDC	802	0.23%	0
United Party of Retirees and Pensioners	PURP	635	0.18%	0
Together for the People	JPP	448	0.13%	0
Valid votes		353,452	100.00%	16
Blank votes		9,159	2.48%	
Rejected votes – other		6,123	1.66%	
Total polled		368,734	56.08%	
Registered electors		657,457		

The following candidates were elected: Amadeu Soares Albergaria (PàF); Rosa Albernaz (PS); João Pinho de Almeida (PàF); Fernando Rocha Andrade (PS); Regina Bastos (PàF); Filipe Neto Brandão (PS); Bruno Coimbra (PàF); Helga Correia (PàF); Moisés Ferreira (BE); Susana Lamas (PàF); António Carlos Monteiro (PàF); Luís Montenegro (PàF); Ulisses Pereira (PàF); Pedro Nuno Santos (PS); Porfírio Silva (PS); and António Topa (PàF).

===== 2011 =====
Results of the 2011 legislative election held on 5 June 2011:

Party		Votes	%	Seats
Social Democratic Party	PSD	170,869	46.36%	8
Socialist Party	PS	99,652	27.04%	5
CDS – People's Party	CDS–PP	49,539	13.44%	2
Left Bloc	BE	19,327	5.24%	1
Unitary Democratic Coalition	CDU	15,729	4.27%	0
Portuguese Workers' Communist Party	PCTP	3,284	0.89%	0
Party for Animals and Nature	PAN	3,040	0.82%	0
National Renewal Party	PNR	1,354	0.37%	0
Hope for Portugal Movement	MEP	1,318	0.36%	0
The Earth Party Movement	MPT	1,297	0.35%	0
People's Monarchist Party	PPM	1,046	0.28%	0
Portuguese Labour Party	PTP	993	0.27%	0
Pro-Life Party	PPV	720	0.20%	0
Democratic Party of the Atlantic	PDA	408	0.11%	0
Valid votes		368,576	100.00%	16
Blank votes		11,055	2.88%	
Rejected votes – other		4,705	1.22%	
Total polled		384,336	59.00%	
Registered electors		651,452		

The following candidates were elected: Amadeu Soares Albergaria (PSD); Rosa Albernaz (PS); Raúl de Almeida (CDS-PP); Helena André (PS); Filipe Neto Brandão (PS); Paula Cardoso (PSD); Paulo Cavaleiro (PSD); Bruno Coimbra (PSD); Luís Montenegro (PSD); Ulisses Pereira (PSD); Sérgio Sousa Pinto (PS); Paulo Portas (CDS-PP); Carla Rodrigues (PSD); Couto dos Santos (PSD); Pedro Nuno Santos (PS); and Pedro Filipe Soares (BE).

==== 2000s ====
===== 2009 =====
Results of the 2009 legislative election held on 27 September 2009:

Party		Votes	%	Seats
Social Democratic Party	PSD	134,842	35.65%	7
Socialist Party	PS	131,693	34.82%	6
CDS – People's Party	CDS–PP	50,663	13.39%	2
Left Bloc	BE	34,975	9.25%	1
Unitary Democratic Coalition	CDU	14,985	3.96%	0
Portuguese Workers' Communist Party	PCTP	2,960	0.78%	0
Merit and Society Movement	MMS	2,520	0.67%	0
Hope for Portugal Movement	MEP	1,501	0.40%	0
New Democracy Party	ND	1,030	0.27%	0
People's Monarchist Party	PPM	1,004	0.27%	0
Pro-Life Party	PPV	759	0.20%	0
National Renewal Party	PNR	680	0.18%	0
The Earth Party Movement and Humanist Party	MPT-PH	645	0.17%	0
Valid votes		378,257	100.00%	16
Blank votes		7,073	1.81%	
Rejected votes – other		4,852	1.24%	
Total polled		390,182	60.67%	
Registered electors		643,077		

The following candidates were elected: Amadeu Soares Albergaria (PSD); Rosa Albernaz (PS); Raúl de Almeida (CDS-PP); Filipe Neto Brandão (PS); Afonso Candal (PS); Paula Cardoso (PSD); Paulo Cavaleiro (PSD); Vítor Fontes (PS); Luís Montenegro (PSD); Ulisses Pereira (PSD); Sérgio Sousa Pinto (PS); Paulo Portas (CDS-PP); Carla Rodrigues (PSD); Maria de Belém Roseira (PS); Couto dos Santos (PSD); and Pedro Filipe Soares (BE).

===== 2005 =====
Results of the 2005 legislative election held on 20 February 2005:

Party		Votes	%	Seats
Socialist Party	PS	159,955	42.26%	8
Social Democratic Party	PSD	139,109	36.75%	6
CDS – People's Party	CDS–PP	38,001	10.04%	1
Left Bloc	BE	19,846	5.24%	0
Unitary Democratic Coalition	CDU	13,809	3.65%	0
New Democracy Party	ND	3,543	0.94%	0
Portuguese Workers' Communist Party	PCTP	2,370	0.63%	0
Humanist Party	PH	1,092	0.29%	0
National Renewal Party	PNR	768	0.20%	0
Valid votes		378,493	100.00%	15
Blank votes		7,411	1.90%	
Rejected votes – other		3,789	0.97%	
Total polled		389,693	65.11%	
Registered electors		598,528		

The following candidates were elected: Rosa Albernaz (PS); Costa Amorim (PS); Regina Bastos (PSD); Afonso Candal (PS); Maria do Rosário Carneiro (PS); Armando França (PS); Hermínio Loureiro (PSD); Luís Marques Mendes (PSD); Luís Montenegro (PSD); Manuel Oliveira (PSD); Manuel Pinho (PS); Paulo Portas (CDS-PP); José Manuel Ribeiro (PSD); Pedro Nuno Santos (PS); and Helena Terra (PS).

===== 2002 =====
Results of the 2002 legislative election held on 17 March 2002:

Party		Votes	%	Seats
Social Democratic Party	PSD	169,926	47.22%	8
Socialist Party	PS	122,606	34.07%	5
CDS – People's Party	CDS–PP	47,131	13.10%	2
Unitary Democratic Coalition	CDU	9,554	2.66%	0
Left Bloc	BE	6,647	1.85%	0
Portuguese Workers' Communist Party	PCTP	1,472	0.41%	0
Humanist Party	PH	933	0.26%	0
People's Monarchist Party	PPM	819	0.23%	0
The Earth Party Movement	MPT	760	0.21%	0
Valid votes		359,848	100.00%	15
Blank votes		3,718	1.01%	
Rejected votes – other		2,937	0.80%	
Total polled		366,503	61.66%	
Registered electors		594,408		

The following candidates were elected: Rosa Albernaz (PS); Afonso Candal (PS); João Cravinho (PS); Isménia Franco (PSD); Acílio Gala (CDS-PP); Antero Gaspar (PS); Jorge Oliveira Godinho (PSD); Hermínio Loureiro (PSD); Gonçalo Breda Marques (PSD); Luís Marques Mendes (PSD); Luís Montenegro (PSD); Manuel Oliveira (PSD); Paulo Portas (CDS-PP); Maria de Belém Roseira (PS); and Cruz Silva (PSD).

==== 1990s ====
===== 1999 =====
Results of the 1999 legislative election held on 10 October 1999:

Party		Votes	%	Seats
Socialist Party	PS	145,577	40.88%	7
Social Democratic Party	PSD	138,717	38.96%	6
CDS – People's Party	CDS–PP	49,196	13.82%	2
Unitary Democratic Coalition	CDU	12,787	3.59%	0
Left Bloc	BE	4,677	1.31%	0
Portuguese Workers' Communist Party	PCTP	1,520	0.43%	0
People's Monarchist Party	PPM	1,142	0.32%	0
Humanist Party	PH	971	0.27%	0
The Earth Party Movement	MPT	842	0.24%	0
National Solidarity Party	PSN	662	0.19%	0
Valid votes		356,091	100.00%	15
Blank votes		3,424	0.94%	
Rejected votes – other		2,822	0.78%	
Total polled		362,337	63.40%	
Registered electors		571,554		

The following candidates were elected: Rosa Albernaz (PS); Castro de Almeida (PSD); Afonso Candal (PS); João Cravinho (PS); Acílio Gala (CDS-PP); Antero Gaspar (PS); Hermínio Loureiro (PSD); Rui Marqueiro (PS); Luís Marques Mendes (PSD); José Mota (PS); Manuel Oliveira (PSD); Paulo Portas (CDS-PP); Cruz Silva (PSD); João Carlos da Silva (PS); and Armando Vieira (PSD).

===== 1995 =====
Results of the 1995 legislative election held on 1 October 1995:

Party		Votes	%	Seats
Social Democratic Party	PSD	158,152	41.91%	6
Socialist Party	PS	154,396	40.92%	6
CDS – People's Party	CDS–PP	48,383	12.82%	2
Unitary Democratic Coalition	CDU	10,522	2.79%	0
Portuguese Workers' Communist Party	PCTP	1,440	0.38%	0
Revolutionary Socialist Party	PSR	1,385	0.37%	0
Popular Democratic Union	UDP	1,124	0.30%	0
National Solidarity Party	PSN	851	0.23%	0
People's Monarchist Party and The Earth Party Movement	PPM-MPT	610	0.16%	0
People's Party	PG	459	0.12%	0
Valid votes		377,322	100.00%	14
Blank votes		2,750	0.72%	
Rejected votes – other		3,604	0.94%	
Total polled		383,676	71.18%	
Registered electors		539,057		

The following candidates were elected: Rosa Albernaz (PS); Castro de Almeida (PSD); Carlos Candal (PS); Jorge Roque Cunha (PSD); Antero Gaspar (PS); Hermínio Loureiro (PSD); Gilberto Parca Madail (PSD); Rui Marques (CDS-PP); Manuel Strecht Monteiro (PS); José Mota (PS); Manuel Oliveira (PSD); José Pacheco Pereira (PSD); Paulo Portas (CDS-PP); and António Reis (PS).

===== 1991 =====
Results of the 1991 legislative election held on 6 October 1991:

Party		Votes	%	Seats
Social Democratic Party	PSD	217,615	59.56%	9
Socialist Party	PS	103,308	28.27%	4
Social Democratic Centre Party	CDS	22,624	6.19%	1
Unitary Democratic Coalition	CDU	10,427	2.85%	0
National Solidarity Party	PSN	4,628	1.27%	0
Revolutionary Socialist Party	PSR	2,148	0.59%	0
Portuguese Workers' Communist Party	PCTP	1,646	0.45%	0
People's Monarchist Party	PPM	1,409	0.39%	0
Democratic Renewal Party	PRD	1,133	0.31%	0
Left Revolutionary Front	FER	462	0.13%	0
Valid votes		365,400	100.00%	14
Blank votes		2,380	0.64%	
Rejected votes – other		3,352	0.90%	
Total polled		371,132	70.77%	
Registered electors		524,428		

The following candidates were elected: Ferraz de Abreu (PS); Maria Manuela Aguiar (PSD); Castro de Almeida (PSD); Adérito Campos (PSD); Carlos Candal (PS); Manuel Baptista Cardoso (PSD); Ângelo Correia (PSD); Elias da Costa (PSD); Oliveira Costa (PSD); Teresa Santa Clara Gomes (PS); Jaime Milhomens (PSD); José Mota (PS); Girão Pereira (CDS); and José Júlio Ribeiro (PSD).

==== 1980s ====
===== 1987 =====
Results of the 1987 legislative election held on 19 July 1987:

Party		Votes	%	Seats
Social Democratic Party	PSD	215,540	61.52%	11
Socialist Party	PS	81,675	23.31%	4
Social Democratic Centre Party	CDS	18,794	5.36%	0
Unitary Democratic Coalition	CDU	15,784	4.50%	0
Democratic Renewal Party	PRD	9,493	2.71%	0
Portuguese Democratic Movement	MDP	2,692	0.77%	0
Christian Democratic Party	PDC	1,408	0.40%	0
Revolutionary Socialist Party	PSR	1,371	0.39%	0
Popular Democratic Union	UDP	1,355	0.39%	0
Communist Party (Reconstructed)	PC(R)	841	0.24%	0
People's Monarchist Party	PPM	761	0.22%	0
Portuguese Workers' Communist Party	PCTP	662	0.19%	0
Valid votes		350,376	100.00%	15
Blank votes		2,602	0.73%	
Rejected votes – other		4,155	1.16%	
Total polled		357,133	74.74%	
Registered electors		477,832		

The following candidates were elected: Ferraz de Abreu (PS); Casimiro de Almeida (PSD); Valdemar Alves (PSD); Joaquim Araújo (PS); Adérito Campos (PSD); José Ferreira de Campos (PSD); Carlos Candal (PS); Manuel Baptista Cardoso (PSD); Ângelo Correia (PSD); Oliveira Costa (PSD); Arnaldo Brito Lhamas (PSD); Gilberto Parca Madail (PSD); Jaime Milhomens (PSD); José Mota (PS); and Flausino Silva (PS).

===== 1985 =====
Results of the 1985 legislative election held on 6 October 1985:

Party		Votes	%	Seats
Social Democratic Party	PSD	135,247	39.31%	6
Socialist Party	PS	80,849	23.50%	4
Social Democratic Centre Party	CDS	47,501	13.81%	2
Democratic Renewal Party	PRD	47,026	13.67%	2
United People Alliance	APU	22,735	6.61%	1
Popular Democratic Union	UDP	2,791	0.81%	0
Christian Democratic Party	PDC	2,567	0.75%	0
Revolutionary Socialist Party	PSR	2,024	0.59%	0
Portuguese Workers' Communist Party	PCTP	1,348	0.39%	0
Workers' Party of Socialist Unity	POUS	1,225	0.36%	0
Communist Party (Reconstructed)	PC(R)	738	0.21%	0
Valid votes		344,051	100.00%	15
Blank votes		2,576	0.73%	
Rejected votes – other		5,477	1.56%	
Total polled		352,104	75.85%	
Registered electors		464,194		

The following candidates were elected: Ferraz de Abreu (PS); Adérito Campos (PSD); Carlos Candal (PS); José Manuel Casqueiro (PSD); Ângelo Correia (PSD); Manuel Fonseca (PSD); António Frederico (PS); Arnaldo Brito Lhamas (PSD); Joaquim Martins (PSD); César de Menezes (CDS); José Mota (PS); Girão Pereira (CDS); Rui de Sá (PRD); Aníbal Santos (PRD); and Zita Seabra (APU).

===== 1983 =====
Results of the 1983 legislative election held on 25 April 1983:

Party		Votes	%	Seats
Socialist Party	PS	125,035	37.49%	6
Social Democratic Party	PSD	119,058	35.69%	6
Social Democratic Centre Party	CDS	56,115	16.82%	2
United People Alliance	APU	23,963	7.18%	1
Christian Democratic Party	PDC	2,396	0.72%	0
People's Monarchist Party	PPM	1,836	0.55%	0
Popular Democratic Union	UDP	1,684	0.50%	0
Workers' Party of Socialist Unity	POUS	870	0.26%	0
Portuguese Workers' Communist Party	PCTP	806	0.24%	0
Revolutionary Socialist Party	PSR	785	0.24%	0
Portuguese Marxist–Leninist Communist Organization	OCMLP	518	0.16%	0
Socialist Workers League	LST	490	0.15%	0
Valid votes		333,556	100.00%	15
Blank votes		2,184	0.64%	
Rejected votes – other		6,350	1.86%	
Total polled		342,090	79.06%	
Registered electors		432,703		

The following candidates were elected: Ferraz de Abreu (PS); Mário Adegas (PSD); Rosa Albernaz (PS); Rocha de Almeida (PSD); António Bagão (CDS); Alberto Camboa (PS); Adérito Campos (PSD); Ângelo Correia (PSD); Manuel Fonseca (PSD); António Frederico (PS); José Mota (PS); Girão Pereira (CDS); Faria dos Santos (PSD); Zita Seabra (APU); and José Valente (PS).

===== 1980 =====
Results of the 1980 legislative election held on 5 October 1980:

Party		Votes	%	Seats
Democratic Alliance	AD	211,408	60.00%	10
Republican and Socialist Front	FRS	97,457	27.66%	4
United People Alliance	APU	24,553	6.97%	1
Workers' Party of Socialist Unity	POUS	6,341	1.80%	0
Labour Party	PT	2,737	0.78%	0
Popular Democratic Union	UDP	2,674	0.76%	0
Christian Democratic Party, Independent Movement for the National Reconstruction / Party of the Portuguese Right and National Front	PDC- MIRN/ PDP- FN	2,550	0.72%	0
Portuguese Workers' Communist Party	PCTP	2,504	0.71%	0
Revolutionary Socialist Party	PSR	2,135	0.61%	0
Valid votes		352,359	100.00%	15
Blank votes		1,722	0.48%	
Rejected votes – other		5,185	1.44%	
Total polled		359,266	86.08%	
Registered electors		417,378		

The following candidates were elected: Mário Adegas (AD); Valdemar Alves (AD); Adérito Campos (AD); Carlos Candal (FRS); Luis Coimbra (AD); Ângelo Correia (AD); Gomes Fernandes (FRS); Manuel Fonseca (AD); Teresa Santa Clara Gomes (FRS); Mário Henriques (AD); Vital Moreira (APU); Girão Pereira (AD); Maria José Sampaio (AD); Faria dos Santos (AD); and Avelino Zenha (FRS).

==== 1970s ====
===== 1979 =====
Results of the 1979 legislative election held on 2 December 1979:

Party		Votes	%	Seats
Democratic Alliance	AD	202,837	58.07%	9
Socialist Party	PS	101,574	29.08%	5
United People Alliance	APU	28,251	8.09%	1
Christian Democratic Party	PDC	6,149	1.76%	0
Popular Democratic Union	UDP	4,148	1.19%	0
Portuguese Workers' Communist Party	PCTP	2,599	0.74%	0
Left-wing Union for the Socialist Democracy	UEDS	1,940	0.56%	0
Revolutionary Socialist Party	PSR	1,790	0.51%	0
Valid votes		349,288	100.00%	15
Blank votes		1,985	0.55%	
Rejected votes – other		6,653	1.86%	
Total polled		357,926	88.28%	
Registered electors		405,459		

The following candidates were elected: Mário Adegas (AD); Valdemar Alves (AD); Alberto Camboa (PS); Carlos Candal (PS); José Ribeiro e Castro (AD); Ângelo Correia (AD); Amadeu Cruz (PS); Manuel Fonseca (AD); António Ferreira Melo (AD); Vital Moreira (APU); Rui Pena (AD); Fernando Raimundo Rodrigues (AD); Manuel Melo Santos (PS); Armando Adão Silva (AD); and Avelino Zenha (PS).

===== 1976 =====
Results of the 1976 legislative election held on 25 April 1976:

Party		Votes	%	Seats
Democratic People's Party	PPD	113,595	36.72%	6
Socialist Party	PS	99,647	32.21%	5
Social Democratic Centre Party	CDS	72,638	23.48%	4
Portuguese Communist Party	PCP	11,962	3.87%	0
Popular Democratic Union	UDP	2,955	0.96%	0
Christian Democratic Party	PDC	1,591	0.51%	0
Movement of Socialist Left	MES	1,519	0.49%	0
Re-Organized Movement of the Party of the Proletariat	MRPP	1,330	0.43%	0
People's Socialist Front	FSP	1,224	0.40%	0
People's Monarchist Party	PPM	1,187	0.38%	0
Worker–Peasant Alliance	AOC	935	0.30%	0
Internationalist Communist League	LCI	804	0.26%	0
Valid votes		309,387	100.00%	15
Rejected votes		13,730	4.25%	
Total polled		323,117	84.60%	
Registered electors		381,918		

The following candidates were elected: Mário Cal Brandão (PS); Carlos Candal (PS); José Rebocho Christo (CDS); Ângelo Correia (PPD); Arnaldo Brito Lhamas (PPD); Victor Machado (CDS); Sebastião Marques (PPD); Alcides Monteiro (PS); Álvaro Dias Ribeiro (CDS); José Júlio Ribeiro (PPD); Cunha Rodrigues (PPD); Reinaldo Rodrigues (PS); Maria José Sampaio (CDS); António Júlio Silva (PPD); and Avelino Zenha (PS).
