= João Almeida (politician) =

Portuguese jurist and politician

Member of the Assembly of the Republic
- Incumbent
- Assumed office 5 April 2024
- Constituency: Porto
- In office 4 April 2002 – 28 March 2022
- Constituency: Lisbon (2002–2009); Porto (2009–2015); Aveiro (2015–2022)

Secretary of State of Internal Administration
- In office 30 December 2013 – 26 November 2015
- Prime Minister: Pedro Passos Coelho
- Minister: Miguel Macedo; Anabela Miranda Rodrigues; João Calvão da Silva

Member of the São João da Madeira City Council
- Incumbent
- Assumed office 26 September 2021

President of the People's Youth
- In office 1999–2007
- Preceded by: Pedro Mota Soares
- Succeeded by: Pedro Moutinho

Personal details
- Born: João Rodrigo Pinho de Almeida; 11 September 1976 (age 49) São João da Madeira, Portugal
- Party: CDS – People's Party
- Children: 2
- Education: Catholic University of Portugal
- Occupation: Jurist • Politician

João Rodrigo Pinho de Almeida (born 11 September 1976) is a Portuguese jurist and politician who was a member of the Assembly of the Republic from 2002 to 2022, and again since 2024, as a member of the CDS – People's Party. He was also Secretary of State of Internal Administration in the XIX Constitutional Government and in the XX Constitutional Government, led by Pedro Passos Coelho.

He succeeded Nuno Melo as a member of Parliament when he resigned to be Minister of National Defence. Almeida and Paulo Núncio are the MPs of the CDS-PP.
