= Zita Seabra =

Portuguese politician

Member of the Assembly of the Republic
- In office 20 February 2005 – 27 September 2009
- Constituency: Coimbra
- In office 25 April 1976 – 19 July 1987
- Constituency: Lisbon (1976–1983); Aveiro (1983–1987)

Member of the Vila Franca de Xira City Council
- In office 14 December 1997 – 16 December 2001

Personal details
- Born: Zita Maria de Seabra Roseiro; 25 May 1949 (age 77) Coimbra, Portugal
- Party: Liberal Initiative (2019–present)
- Other political affiliations: Portuguese Communist Party (1965–1990); Independent (1990–1996); Social Democratic Party (1996–2019)
- Spouse: Carlos Brito (div. 1986)
- Domestic partner: João Guimarães
- Children: 3
- Education: University of Coimbra
- Occupation: Publisher • Politician

Zita Maria de Seabra Roseiro (born 25 May 1949) is a Portuguese politician and publisher.

== Politics ==
Zita Seabra joined the Portuguese Communist Party in 1966, before she was eighteen years old and was controller of the UEC (in Portuguese: União dos Estudantes Comunistas - Communist Student Union) before and after the Carnation Revolution. As a member of the Communist Party, she was elected to and served in the Portuguese parliament, representing Lisbon and Aveiro between 1980 and 1987. She was elected to the Political Commission of the party at its 10th Congress in 1983. In 1982 she was responsible for introducing in parliament for the first time a bill to legalize abortion, which failed. She abandoned the Communist Party shortly before the fall of the Soviet Union, and became one of the most widely known party dissidents. Due to her criticisms of the party, she was expelled from its Political Committee in 1988, and then purged from the party's Central Committee. In 1988 she published the book The Name of Things: Reflections During Times of Change which went through seven printings by the following year. In 1989 she traveled to Russia to cover its first free elections for the Expresso newspaper. During the visit, she was struck by the contrast between what she had read about the country in its propaganda as a workers' paradise and what she observed. She was expelled from the party in 1990. After publicly renouncing communism, she joined the center-right Social Democratic Party (PSD) and rejoined the Assembly of the Republic representing her home district of Coimbra. She was Vice-President of the Parliamentary Group of the Social Democratic Party. She also became opposed to legalized abortion. She would convert to Roman Catholicism. After the establishment of the Portuguese party Liberal Initiative in 2017, she joined this party.

== Arts ==
With an interest in the arts, she directed the National Audio-Visual Bureau, and, in 1993, she became president of the Portuguese Film Institute. From 1994 to 1995, she was the President of the Portuguese Institute of Cinematographic and Audiovisual Arts. In the private sector, she has been very active in publishing. She was editor of the Quetzal publishing house, administrator and editorial director of Bertrand Publishers, and is currently the President of the Executive Board and Director of the Alêtheia publishing house in Lisbon, which she founded.

== Books ==
- O Nome das Coisas (The Name of Things; 1989—not yet translated into English)
- Foi Assim (How it Was; 2007, autobiography) available in Kindle Book format from Amazon.
- Auto-de-fé, a Igreja na Inquisição da Opinião Pública, com P. Gonçalo Portocarrero de Almada. Alêtheia Editores, 2012
- Contributo para a História do Feminismo, prefácio. Alêtheia Editores, 2018
