= Albernaz =

Albernaz is a Portuguese surname. Notable people with the surname include:

- Craig Albernaz (born 1982), American baseball coach
- João Teixeira Albernaz I (late 16th century–c. 1662), Portuguese cartographer, brother of Pedro
- Pedro Teixeira Albernaz (1595–1662), Portuguese cartographer
- Rosa Albernaz (born 1947), Portuguese politician
