= Helena André =

Portuguese politician (born 1960)

Helena André ComM

Minister of Labour and Social Security, Portugal
- In office 2009–2011

Member of the Assembly of the Republic, Portugal
- In office June 2011 – August 2013

Personal details
- Born: 29 October 1960 (age 66) Paço de Arcos, Portugal
- Party: Socialist Party (PS)
- Education: University of Lisbon

Helena André (born, 29 October 1960, Paço de Arcos, Portugal) is a Portuguese politician and a former Minister of Labour and Social Solidarity of the XVIII Constitutional Government of Portugal between 2009 and 2011. Since 2013 she has held a senior position in the International Labour Organization (ILO), based in Geneva.

== Early life ==
Maria Helena dos Santos André was born in Paço de Arcos in the municipality of Oeiras, just to the west of the Portuguese capital, Lisbon. She obtained a degree in Modern Languages and Literatures from the Faculty of Letters of the University of Lisbon. She speaks fluent English, French and Spanish.

== Early career ==
Between 1981 and 1991, André worked for the General Workers Union (União Geral de Trabalhadores – UGT), first as an assistant in the International Affairs Department and then as head of that department, with responsibility for coordinating the European and International Relations of the UGT. From 1985-1991 she was also a member of the Paço de Arcos parish council. In January 1992, she joined the European Trade Union Confederation (ETUC), based in Brussels. She covered a wide range of issues, including labour market policy; vocational education and training; regional policy and interregional trade union committees; social exclusion; racism and xenophobia; and youth policies. Between 2003 and 2009 she was deputy general secretary of ETUC. In this time she was also Coordinator of the Workers' Group in the Bureau and Management Board of the European Centre for the Development of Vocational Training (Cedefop) and a member of the Scientific Council of the Institute for Research on Employment at Edinburgh Napier University, Scotland.

== Political activities ==
A member of the Portuguese Socialist Party (PS), André was appointed Minister of Labour and Social Security in the 18th Constitutional Government (2009 - 2011). Between June 2011 and August 2013 she represented Aveiro as a member of the Assembly of the Republic, the Portuguese parliament, where she was a member of four Parliamentary committees, including European Affairs, and Social Security and Labour.

== International Labour Organization ==
From 1 September 2013 André became the Director of the International Labour Organization's Bureau for Workers’ Activities (ACTRAV). ACTRAV provides the main link between the ILO and workers' organizations. Its function is to ensure that the concerns and interests of workers' organizations are taken into account in ILO's policy development and field activities.

== Awards and honours ==
- On 11 March 2000, Helena André was made Commander of the Portuguese Order of Merit.
