= Regina Bastos =

Portuguese lawyer and politician

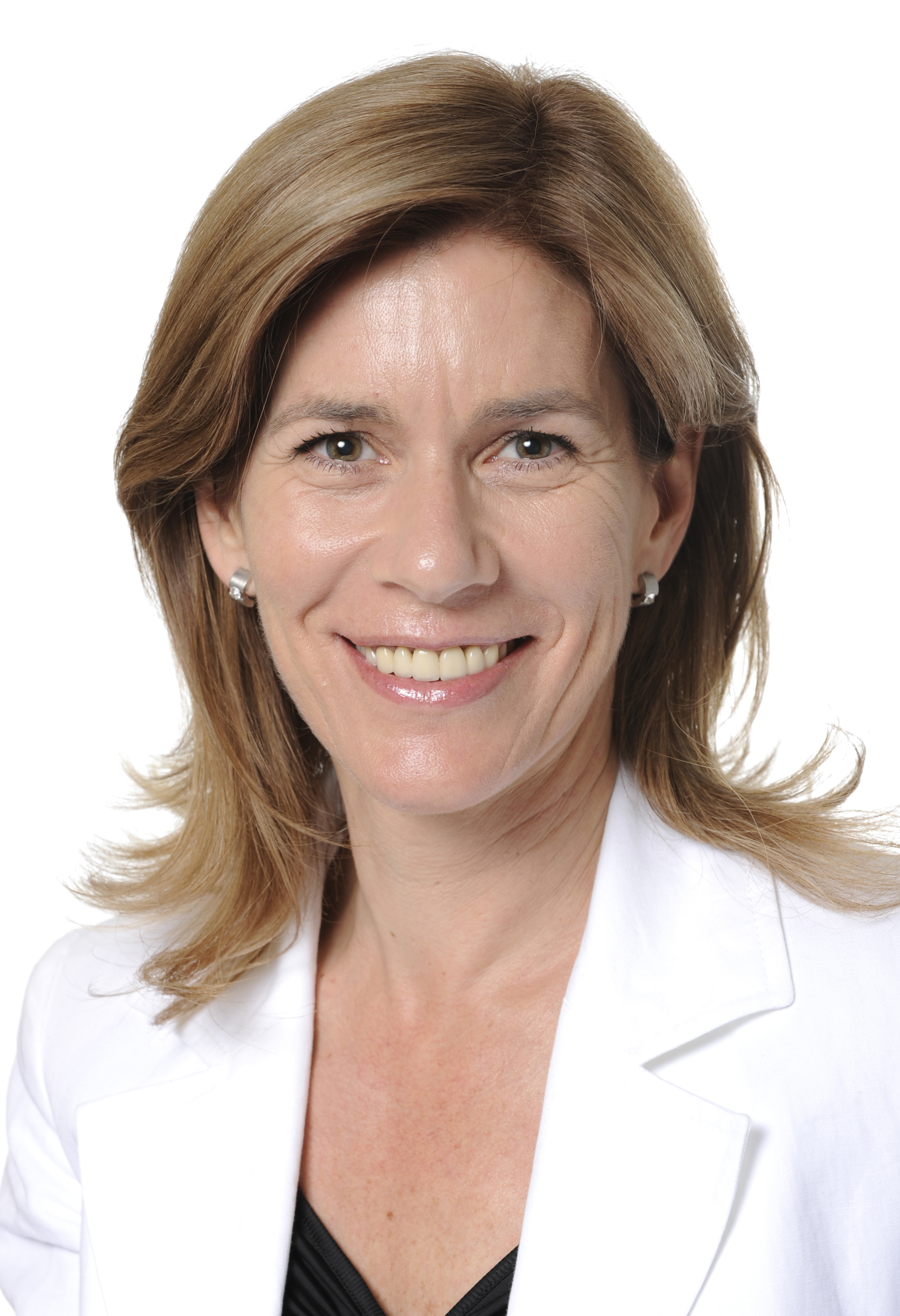
- Official portrait as an MEP, 2009

Member of the Assembly of the Republic
- Incumbent
- Assumed office 2 April 2024
- Constituency: Lisbon
- In office 22 October 2015 – 24 October 2019
- Constituency: Aveiro
- In office 10 March 2005 – 13 July 2009
- Constituency: Aveiro

Member of the European Parliament
- In office 14 July 2009 – 30 June 2014
- Constituency: Portugal
- In office 24 July 1999 – 20 July 2004
- Constituency: Portugal

President of the Estarreja Municipal Assembly
- In office 1 October 2017 – 3 November 2025

President of the Aveiro Municipal Assembly
- In office 9 October 2005 – 13 July 2009

Personal details
- Born: Regina Maria Pinto da Fonseca Ramos Bastos; 4 November 1960 (age 65) Estarreja, Portugal
- Party: Social Democratic Party
- Children: 1
- Occupation: Lawyer • Politician

Regina Maria Pinto da Fonseca Ramos Bastos (born 4 November 1960) is a Portuguese lawyer and politician. She was a member of the European Parliament from 1999 to 2004 and from 2009 to 2014 as a member of the European People's Party.

She was born in Estarreja and holds a bachelor's degree in law. She was a member of the Portuguese Social Democratic Party. She served in the municipal assembly for Estarreja from 1989 to 2001. After serving in the European Parliament, she was a member of the Portuguese Assembly of the Republic from 2005 until 2009, when she was again elected to the European Parliament. In 2011, she was named to the short list for the prize for the Best Member of the European Parliament.

Regina Bastos served as President of the Municipal Assembly of Estarreja from 2005 to 2009, and again since 2017.

She succeeded Luís Montenegro as a member of Parliament when he resigned to become Prime Minister.
