= Pedro Frazão =

Portuguese veterinarian and politician

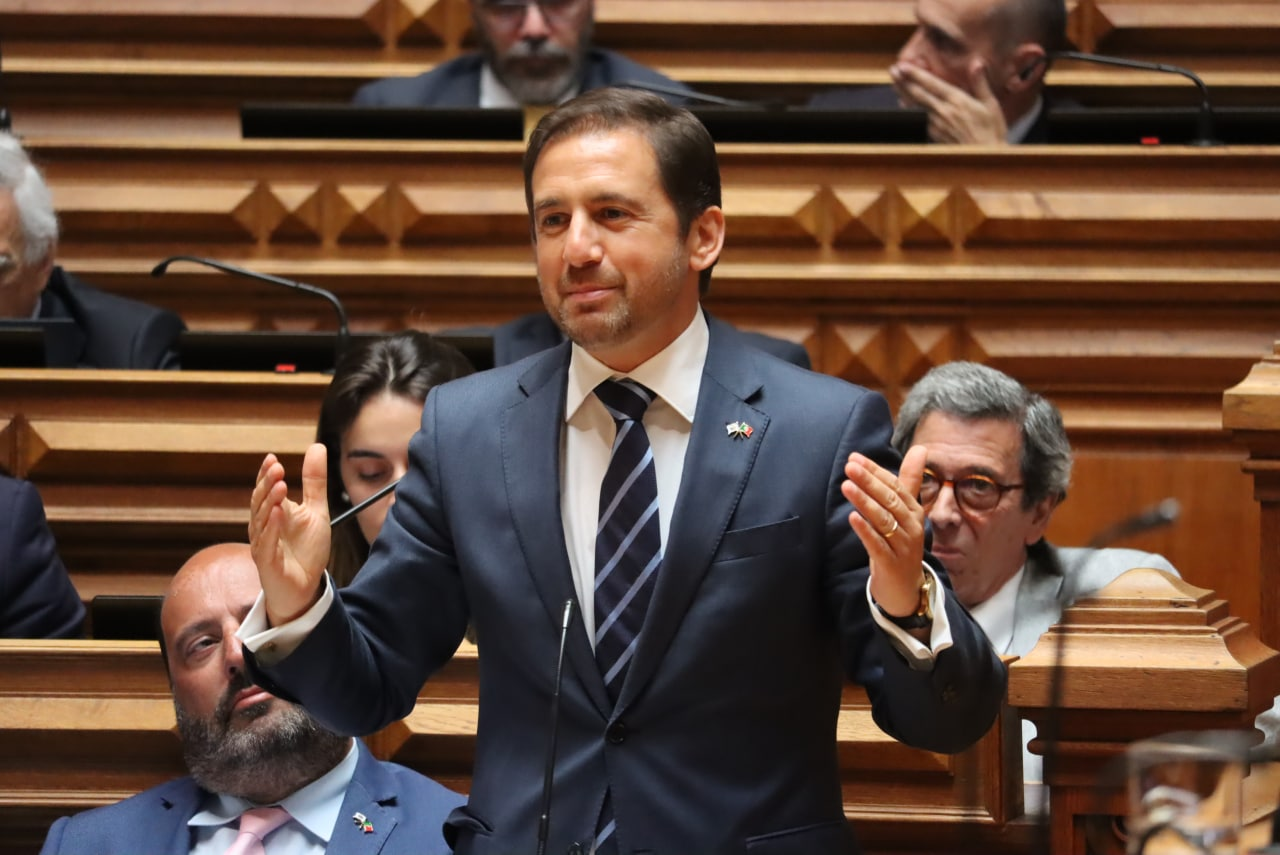

Member of the Assembly of the Republic
- Incumbent
- Assumed office 29 March 2022
- Constituency: Santarém (2022–2025); Aveiro (2025–present)

Member of the Oeiras City Council
- Incumbent
- Assumed office 12 October 2025

Member of the Santarém City Council
- In office 26 September 2021 – 18 October 2024

Personal details
- Born: Pedro Saraiva Gonçalves dos Santos Frazão; 27 April 1975 (age 51) Lisbon, Portugal
- Party: Chega (since 2019)
- Other political affiliations: Social Democratic Party (formerly)
- Children: 7
- Education: University of Algarve; Woods Hole Oceanographic Institution

Pedro Saraiva Gonçalves dos Santos Frazão (born 27 April 1975) is a Portuguese veterinarian and politician for the Chega party. Since 2022 he has been a member of the Assembly of the Republic representing the Santarém constituency and is a vice-president of Chega.

== Biography ==
=== Career ===
Frazão was born to a military family in Lisbon in 1975. He studied marine biology at the University of Algarve and the Woods Hole Oceanographic Institution in the United States before returning to Portugal to study a course in veterinary medicine. He subsequently worked at a veterinary clinic and for the Portuguese Ministry of Agriculture before founding his own veterinary practice. He has also worked as a part-time teacher of veterinary studies. He is a member of Opus Dei and teaches at its Colégio Planalto.

=== Politics ===
Frazão joined Chega in 2019 and has been the party's spokesman on agriculture. He has stated concerns over taxation policies and farming in Portugal motivated his involvement. In May 2021, he was appointed as a vice-president of the party. In the same year, he was elected as a municipal councilor for Chega in Santarém.

For the 2022 Portuguese legislative election, Frazão contested the Santarém constituency and won a seat. In the Assembly he sits on the committees for agriculture, health and political transparency.
