= Helga Correia =

Portuguese politician

Member of the Assembly of the Republic
- Incumbent
- Assumed office 6 June 2025
- Constituency: Aveiro
- In office 23 October 2015 – 25 March 2024
- Constituency: Aveiro

Member of the Oliveira de Azeméis Municipal Assembly
- Incumbent
- Assumed office 29 September 2013

Personal details
- Born: Helga Alexandra Freire Correia; 22 March 1977 (age 49)
- Party: Social Democratic Party
- Spouse: Daniel Pinto Ferreira
- Occupation: Accountant • Politician

Helga Alexandra Freire Correia (born 22 March 1977) is a Portuguese politician. A member of the centre-right Social Democratic Party (PSD), she was elected as a member of the Assembly of the Republic in 2015 as a representative of the Aveiro constituency and was re-elected in 2019 and 2022.

== Early life and education ==
Helga Alexandra Freire Correia was born on 22 March 1977. She has a degree in accounting from the Instituto Superior de Entre o Douro e Vouga (ISVOUGA), and has taken postgraduate courses in training of trainers and in labour law and social security. She is married to Daniel Pinto Ferreira. Correia worked in the insurance industry from 2000.

== Political career ==
In 2009, Correia became an alternate member of the municipal assembly of Oliveira de Azeméis, a municipality which is part of both the Metropolitan Area of Porto and of Aveiro District. Between 2013 and 2017 she served as second secretary of the municipal assembly and in 2017 was elected as a deputy to that assembly.

Correia was elected to the Assembly of the Republic in the 2015 national election and was re-elected in 2019. She was again re-elected in 2022 when, as in 2019, she was fourth on the list of PSD candidates for Aveiro, with the PSD winning seven seats in the district. In parliament, she has served on the Labour and Social Security Committee.
