= António Topa =

Portuguese engineer and politician (1954–2021)

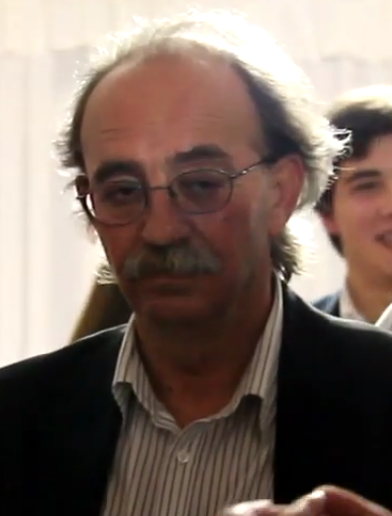
- Topa in 2012

Member of the Assembly of the Republic of Portugal
- In office 23 October 2015 – 31 October 2021

Personal details
- Born: António André da Silva Topa; 2 September 1954
- Died: 31 October 2021 (aged 67)
- Party: PSD

António André da Silva Topa (2 September 1954 – 31 October 2021) was a Portuguese politician and engineer. A member of the Social Democratic Party, he served in the Assembly of the Republic from 2015 until he died of a prolonged illness on 31 October 2021.
