= Fomentinvest =

Fomentinvest is a Portuguese investment holding company headquartered in Lisbon. It comprises three main businesses: Fomentinvest ambiente (environment); Fomentinvest atmosfera (atmosphere); and Fomentinvest energia (energy).

== Businesses ==
- Fomentinvest Ambiente presents a wide investment portfolio in the areas of environment and disposal of urban waste in Portugal.
- Fomentinvest Atmosfera positions itself in the energy, carbon and climate change area.
- Fomentinvest Energia presents a wide investment portfolio in the field of renewable energies, located in Portugal, Spain, Brazil, and Uruguay.

== Notable members ==
Its chairman is Ângelo Correia. Until 2010 the company's managing staff included the politician Pedro Passos Coelho who was elected Prime Minister of Portugal in 2011.
