= Joana Sá Pereira =

Portuguese politician

Deputy in the Portuguese Assembly of the Republic
- Incumbent
- Assumed office 2019
- Constituency: Aveiro

Personal details
- Born: Joana Isabel Martins Rigueiro de Sá Pereira; 4 July 1993 (age 32) Mealhada, Aveiro District, Portugal
- Party: Portuguese: Socialist Party (PS)
- Occupation: Lawyer and politician

Joana Sá Pereira (born 1993) is a Portuguese politician. As a member of the Portuguese Socialist Party (PS), she has been a deputy in the Portuguese Assembly of the Republic since 2019.

== Early life and education ==
Joana Isabel Martins Rigueiro de Sá Pereira was born in Mealhada in the Aveiro District of Portugal on 4 July 1993. She studied law at the Faculty of Law of the University of Coimbra, initially receiving an undergraduate degree in law and then a master's in legal-forensic sciences. She also obtained a postgraduate diploma in labour law at IDET, the Institute of Business and Labour Law (Instituto de Direito das Empresas e do Trabalho) at the same university. Between 2018 and her election to the Assembly at the end of 2019, Pereira worked as a lawyer in Aveiro.

== Political career ==
While at university, Pereira was the student representative at the Faculty of Law's assembly. After leaving university she became president of the Parish Assembly of Pampilhosa, in the municipality of Mealhada. She became president of the Aveiro District Federation of Socialist Youth in 2017 and at the end of 2020 was elected president of the national commission of Socialist Youth. She is a deputy in the Municipal Assembly of Mealhada, having been elected in 2021.

Pereira was elected as a deputy in the Assembly of the Republic in the 2019 Portuguese legislative election, representing Aveiro. She served as a member of the Committee on Constitutional Affairs, Rights, Freedoms and Guarantees and on the Committee of Inquiry into Novo Banco, as well as on the Labour and Social Security Committee. In the 2022 election, called early after the collapse of the governing coalition, she was re-elected, being seventh on the Socialist Party's list for Aveiro District, with the party winning eight seats. In the national election the Socialist Party won an overall majority.
