= Rosa Albernaz =

Portuguese politician

- Born: Rosa Maria da Silva Bastos; 4 September 1947; Portugal
- Occupations: Teacher and parliamentarian
- Years active: 40
- Known for: Having served for 36 years in the Portuguese parliament

Rosa Albernaz is a Portuguese politician. At the time of her resignation from the Assembleia da República, the Portuguese Parliament, in 2018, she was the longest-serving female MP, having been in office for around 36 years.

Rosa Maria da Silva Bastos da Horta Albernaz was born on 4 September 1947. A teacher by profession, she first served in the Second Assembly as a representative for Aveiro in 1980 as a member of the Socialist Party of Portugal (PS) and was re-elected at all subsequent elections. During her time in the Assembly she was a representative of Portugal to the Inter-parliamentary Union (IPU), and was vice president of the IPU’s Democracy and Human Rights Commission. She also served on many of the committees of the Assembly, including those looking at Foreign Affairs, National Defence, and Agriculture and the Sea, where she advocated strongly for protection to be given to the use of traditional fishing gear.

Her resignation from the 13th Assembly in 2018 was slightly controversial. She announced that she was leaving because her daughter had given birth to triplets and supporting this large extension of her family was inconsistent with her parliamentary work. However, she was at the time encountering heavy criticism from her party and others for the number of times she had been absent from the Assembly in December and was in danger of being sanctioned by her party. She replied to the accusations by saying that her absences in December 2018 were because she had to assist her daughter and that, at that time, she had already initiated the necessary steps to retire.
