= Paula Cardoso (politician) =

Portuguese politician (born 1962)

Maria Paula da Graça Cardoso

Member of the Assembly of the Republic
- Incumbent
- Assumed office 28 March 2022
- Constituency: Aveiro
- In office 15 October 2009 – October 2015

Personal details
- Born: 24 August 1962 (age 63) Portugal
- Party: Social Democratic Party
- Occupation: Politician • Lawyer

Maria Paula da Graça Cardoso (born 1962) is a Portuguese politician who was first elected to the Assembly of the Republic of Portugal on 27 September 2009 as a member of the Social Democratic Party (PSD), representing the Aveiro constituency.

== Early life and education ==
Cardosa was born on 24 August 1962. She obtained a degree in law and worked as a lawyer. She has business interests in two companies, one operating in the field of ceramic tiles and the other involved with the manufacture of locks and hinges.

== Political career ==
Cardosa became a councillor on the Águeda municipal council. Águeda is a town in the Aveiro District, well known in Portugal for its annual Umbrella Sky project, where colourful umbrellas are hung above the city's streets. In addition to her role as a councillor she took on several voluntary roles, such as being president of the committee for the protection of children and youth at risk in the town.

Cardoso served the Aveiro constituency in the 11th Legislature of the Third Portuguese Republic (2009–2011), the 12th Legislature (2011–2015), and the 15th Legislature (2022–2024), in which she was one of the vice-presidents of the PSD. In 2022, she participated in a Conference on the Prevention of Sexual Violence in Conflict in London, to argue that there was a lack of adequate legislation to govern this topic.

In the March 2024 election, called after the resignation of the prime minister António Costa following allegations of corruption by members of his government, the Social Democratic Party formed an electoral alliance with two smaller parties, known as the Democratic Alliance (AD). Cardoso was sixth on the AD list of candidates for the Aveiro constituency and was elected when the AD won seven of the 16 available seats in the Assembly. In the parliament she served as president of the Committee on Constitutional Affairs, Rights, Freedoms and Guarantees. Following the collapse of the AD government, a new election was held in May 2025, in which Cardoso was again elected, this time as the third candidate on the AD list for Aveiro.
