= Maria José Aguiar (politician) =

Portuguese politician (born 1968)

Maria José Gomes de Aguiar

Member of the Assembly of the Republic
- Incumbent
- Assumed office 26 March 2024
- Constituency: Aveiro

Personal details
- Born: 20 December 1968 (age 57)
- Party: Portuguese: CHEGA
- Occupation: Politician: schoolteacher

Maria José Gomes de Aguiar (born 1968) is a Portuguese politician and teacher. In the 2024 Portuguese national election she was elected to the Assembly of the Republic as a representative of the right-wing CHEGA party.

== Early life and education ==
Aguiar was born on 20 December 1968. She obtained a degree in visual education and became a schoolteacher.

== Political career ==
Aguiar joined CHEGA and became the president of the CHEGA board for the Aveiro District. In the March 2024 national election she was second on the CHEGA list for the Aveiro constituency and was elected when CHEGA won three of the available 16 seats in the constituency. She remained second on the list for the sudden May 2025 national election and was again elected.

According to the website "Cheganos", Aguiar's husband, and fellow CHEGA activist, Pedro Miguel Alves, had been convicted of domestic violence in 2020, for which he received a suspended sentence.
