= Ângelo Correia =

Portuguese manager, engineer and politician

Ângelo Correia is a Portuguese manager, engineer and politician, former Minister of Internal Administration of the Portuguese Government under the leadership of Francisco Pinto Balsemão. He was also member of the Portuguese Parliament (the Assembleia da República) for the Portuguese Social Democrats (PSD) from 1976 to 1995. He was awarded a degree in chemical-industrial engineering by the Instituto Superior Técnico of the Technical University of Lisbon (1968). Ângelo Correia was appointed chairman of the company Fomentinvest, and worked at that company with Pedro Passos Coelho during the 2000s. Correia, an experienced member of PSD, is a close friend of Passos Coelho, both inside their party and corporate governance careers, and is considered Passos Coelho's political mentor.
