= Mário Amorim Lopes =

Portuguese politician

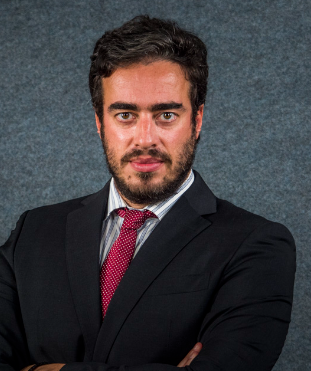
- Mário Amorim Lopes

Member of the Assembly of the Republic
- Incumbent
- Assumed office 26 March 2024
- Constituency: Aveiro

Personal details
- Born: Mário Filipe Amorim Faria de Oliveira Lopes; 12 August 1984 (age 41)
- Party: Liberal Initiative
- Occupation: Politician

Mário Filipe Amorim Faria de Oliveira Lopes (born 12 August 1984) is a Portuguese politician and academic. A member of Liberal Initiative, he was elected in Aveiro to serve in the Assembly of the Republic in the 2024 election. He retained his seat in the 2025 election.

== Electoral history ==
Amorim first won election in Aveiro in the 2024 election with 5.1% of the vote. He was re-elected in the 2025 election with 5.7% of the vote. In both elections, he was the only member of Liberal Initiative to win a seat in Aveiro.

Results by year
Year	Constituency	%	S
Year	Constituency	IL	
2024	Aveiro	5.1	1
2025	Aveiro	5.7	1
