= Susana Correia =

Portuguese politician

Deputy in the Portuguese Assembly of the Republic
- Incumbent
- Assumed office 2019
- Constituency: Aveiro

Personal details
- Born: Susana Alexandra Lopes Correia; 10 June 1976 (age 50) Santa Maria da Feira, Aveiro District, Portugal
- Party: Portuguese: Socialist Party (PS)
- Spouse: Jose Miguel Pinto Leite

Susana Correia (born 1976) is a Portuguese politician. As a member of the Portuguese Socialist Party (PS), she has been a deputy in the Portuguese Assembly of the Republic since 2019.

== Early life and education ==
Susana Alexandra Lopes Correia was born on 10 June 1976 in the municipality of Santa Maria da Feira, in the Aveiro District of Portugal. She obtained a degree in marketing from the University of Aveiro and subsequently obtained qualifications in accounting and administration from the same university.

== Career ==
At the end of 1998 Correia started work at the Centro Hospitalar de Entre Douro e Vouga (CHEDV), a state-run hospital in Santa Maria da Feira, where she coordinated the emergency service. She continued to work at the hospital until she was elected to the National Assembly in 2019.

== Political career ==
In 1999, Correia was asked by the president of the parish council of Espargo in Santa Maria da Feira to assist in the council's secretariat. In 2001 she was herself asked by the Socialist Party to run for president of the council. Successful, she held the position until 2013. From 2013 to 2017 she served as a councillor on the Santa Maria da Feira municipal council and in 2013 she also became a member of the PS National Political Commission. In 2019, she was elected to the Assembly of the Republic on the PS list for Aveiro. In the early national election, held in January 2022, in which the PS won an overall majority, she was re-elected for the Aveiro constituency as the fifth person on the PS list, with the PS winning 8 seats in the District. She was re-elected in the March 2024 election, again in 5th place on the PS list, with the PS winning five seats in the constituency.

Between 2019 and 2021 Correia was a member of the Health Committee and the Foreign Affairs Committee of the Assembly, and served on two working groups, on medically assisted procreation and mental health.
