= Joana Ferreira Lima =

Portuguese politician

Member of the Assembly of the Republic of Portugal
- Incumbent
- Assumed office 2015
- Constituency: Porto

Member of the Assembly of the Republic of Portugal
- In office 2005–2009

Personal details
- Born: Joana Fernanda Ferreira Lima; 18 November 1963 (age 62) Portugal
- Party: Portuguese: Socialist Party (PS)
- Spouse: Divorced
- Education: Lusíada University, Porto

Joana Ferreira Lima (born 1963) is a Portuguese politician. As a member of the Portuguese Socialist Party (PS), she was elected as a deputy to the Assembly of the Republic for 2005 to 2009 and 2015 to 2019 and was re-elected in 2019 and 2022.

== Political career ==
Joana Fernanda Ferreira Lima was born on 18 November 1963. She obtained a degree in international relations from the Porto branch of the Lusíada University. Lima began her political career in the municipality of Trofa, to the north of the Porto metropolitan area, where she was the president of the municipality from 2009 to 2013. She served as a councillor from 2013 to 2016 before resigning due to the complications in travelling frequently between Trofa and Lisbon to serve on the Assembly. After she left the municipality role, several allegations were made regarding misuse of municipal resources. One case went to court and she was acquitted. Lima was also a non-executive director of the Porto Metro company between 2012 and 2015.

Lima was first elected as a deputy to the National Assembly for the 10th Legislature in 2005, representing the Porto constituency. She was not a member during the 11th and 12th Legislatures but returned to the Assembly in 2015, again representing Porto. She was re-elected in 2019 and in 2022. In the parliament she has served on the Health Committee, the Foreign Affairs Committee and the Committee for Environment, Energy and Spatial Planning, and has been coordinator of a Working Group on Monitoring the Asbestos Removal Process in Public Buildings.
