= Cláudia Cruz Santos =

Portuguese academic and politician

Deputy in the Portuguese Assembly of the Republic
- Incumbent
- Assumed office 2019
- Constituency: Aveiro

Personal details
- Born: Cláudia Maria Cruz Santos; 25 January 1971 (age 55) Aveiro, Portugal
- Party: Portuguese: Socialist Party (PS)
- Education: University of Coimbra
- Occupation: Politician

Cláudia Cruz Santos (born 25 January 1971, Aveiro, Portugal) is a Portuguese academic and politician. As a member of the Portuguese Socialist Party (PS), she has been a deputy in the Portuguese Assembly of the Republic since 2019.

== Early life and education ==
Cláudia Maria Cruz Santos was born in Aveiro in Portugal on 25 January 1971, where she attended the José Estêvão Secondary School. She studied at the Faculty of Law at the University of Coimbra, obtaining a law degree in 1994, a master's degree in legal and criminal sciences in 2000, and a PhD in legal and criminal sciences in 2013.

== Academic career ==
Santos is now a professor and researcher at the University of Coimbra. She is a member of the university's Instituto de Direito Penal Económico e Europeu (Institute of Economic and European Criminal Law). Between 2014 and 2019 she also worked at the Lusíada University (Universidade Lusíada) in Porto. Among many other activities, she was a member of the executive committee for the celebrations of the 150th Anniversary of the abolition of the death penalty in Portugal, which took place in 2017. Santos has also been a Portuguese representative on the Group of States against Corruption of the Council of Europe. She has published extensively on legal issues.

== Political career ==
Santos became a member of the Assembly of the Republic in 2019, representing Aveiro, and was re-elected in January 2022, when the PS won a majority in the Assembly and in 2024 when the Democratic Alliance was the leading party. She is the Socialist Party's coordinator on the parliamentary Committee on Constitutional Affairs, Rights, Liberties and Guarantees. She has been a member of the jury for awards for Human Rights and for Science, which are given by the Assembly.

In 2020, she was appointed to head the disciplinary council of the Portuguese Football Federation, an appointment that led to some criticism, including from FC Porto, one of the country's leading clubs.

== Publications ==
Santos has published 7 books on legal issues, some of them with co-authors, over 30 journal articles, and more than 20 chapters in books. She is also the author of two novels: Nenhuma Verdade se Escreve no Singular and A Vida Oculta das Coisas.
