= Filipe Sousa (politician) =

Portuguese politician

Member of the Assembly of the Republic
- Incumbent
- Assumed office 3 June 2025
- Constituency: Madeira

President of Together for the People
- In office 27 January 2015 – 21 January 2024
- Secretary-General: Élvio Sousa
- Preceded by: Party established
- Succeeded by: Lina Pereira

Mayor of Santa Cruz
- In office 29 September 2013 – 2 June 2025
- Deputy: Élia Ascensão
- Preceded by: José Gonçalves
- Succeeded by: Élia Ascensão
Other offices
Member of the Legislative Assembly of Madeira
In office
26 May 2024 – 2 June 2025
In office
15 October 2000 – 6 May 2007
Member of the Santa Cruz City Council
In office
11 October 2009 – 2 June 2025
President of the Gaula Parish
In office
1997–2007

Personal details
- Born: 16 October 1964 (age 61) Gaula, Santa Cruz, Madeira, Portugal
- Party: JPP (since 2008)
- Other political affiliations: PS (until 2007)
- Children: 2
- Relatives: Élvio Sousa (brother)

Filipe Martiniano Martins de Sousa (born 16 October 1964) is a Portuguese politician from Madeira, who is currently a member of the Assembly of the Republic since 2025 and who served as Mayor of Santa Cruz from 2013 to 2025 and as the first President of Together for the People from 2015 to 2024. He is the brother of JPP Secretary-general Élvio Sousa.

== Political career ==
Filipe Sousa was a member of the Socialist Party until 2007, having been a member of the Madeiran regional assembly.

In 2013, he was elected as Mayor of Santa Cruz for the first time, as an independent. In order to be able to run for other offices, he had to create a party, and as such in 2015 he created Together for the People, becoming its first president. Sousa was later re-elected as Mayor of Santa Cruz in 2017 and 2021.

In 2024, he left the party leadership in order to run for that year's legislative election, being a candidate in Madeira. He was elected to the Assembly of the Republic in the 2025 election, being the first MP from the party.
