= Jorge Valsassina Galveias =

Portuguese politician

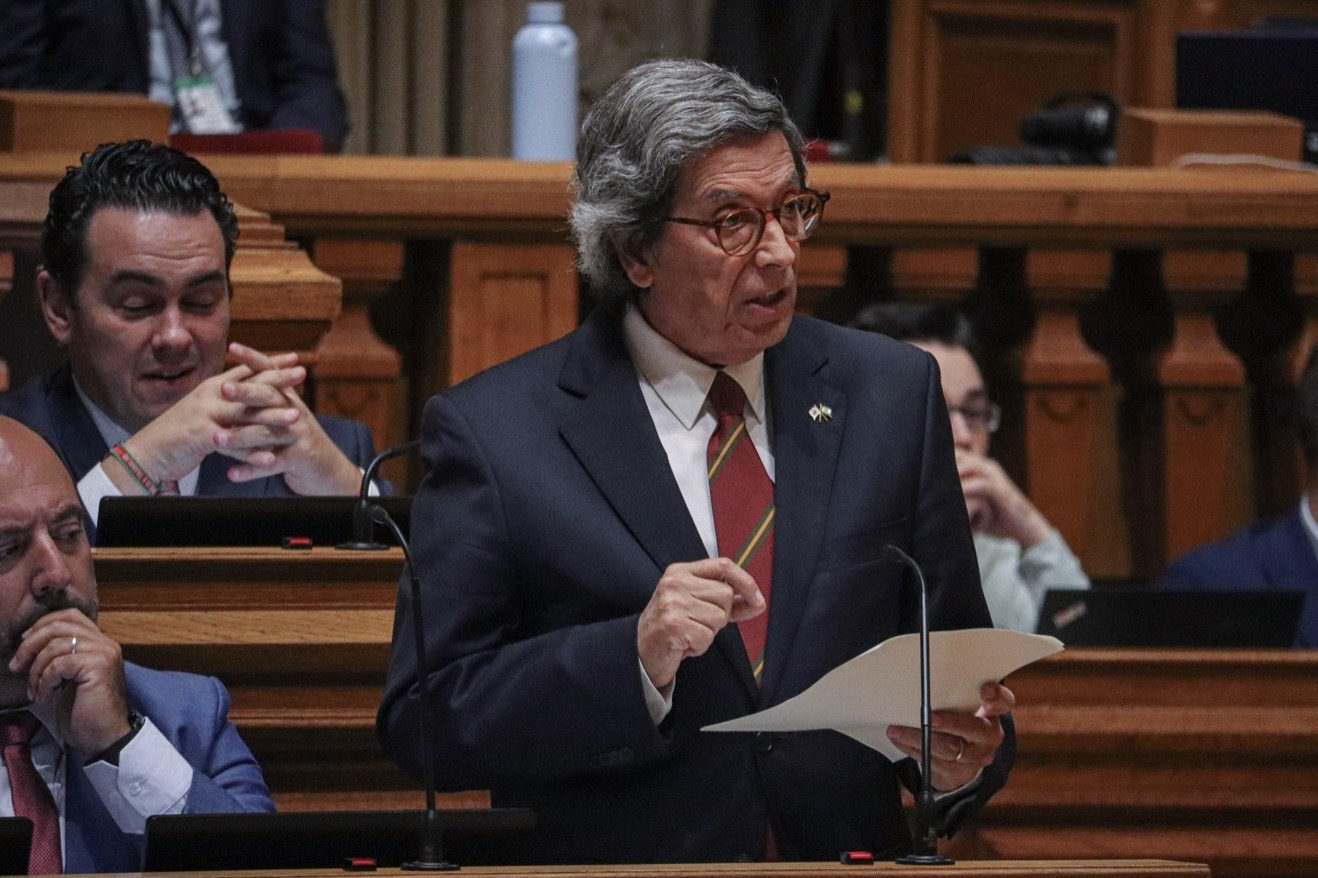
- Galveias in 2023

Member of the Assembly of the Republic
- Incumbent
- Assumed office 29 March 2022
- Constituency: Aveiro (2022–2025); Évora (2025–present)

Personal details
- Born: Jorge Manuel de Valsassina GaIveias Rodrigues; 6 April 1952 (age 74)
- Party: Chega

Jorge Manuel de Valsassina GaIveias Rodrigues (born 6 April 1952) is a Portuguese politician of the Chega party who is a member of the Assembly of the Republic for the Aveiro constituency.

== Biography ==
Galveias was born in 1952. He worked as a management director for an advertisement company for several years before founding a travel and tourism business called Lisbon Holidays which he managed until 2019.

He was a municipal coordinator in the Centro for Chega and is currently chairman of the party's Congressional table. Galveias is also considered close to party leader Andre Ventura. During the 2022 Portuguese legislative election, he was elected to the Assembly of the Republic for the Aveiro constituency. In parliament, he sits on the committees for Culture, Communication, Youth and Sports.
