= Germana Rocha =

Portuguese politician

Maria Germana de Sousa Rocha

Member of the Assembly of the Republic
- Incumbent
- Assumed office 2015
- Constituency: Porto District

Personal details
- Born: 8 June 1968 (age 58)
- Party: Social Democratic Party
- Occupation: Politician

Maria Germana de Sousa Rocha (born 1968) is a Portuguese politician. She became a deputy in the Assembly of the Republic in 2015 as a member of the Social Democratic Party (PSD) and was re-elected in 2019, 2022, 2024 and 2025.

== Biography ==
Rocha was born on 8 June 1968. She obtained a degree in law and worked as a legal officer. Between the beginning of 2012 and March 2014, she was the director of the municipality of Gondomar, which is situated a short distance from Portugal's second city of Porto.

== Political career ==
Rocha was first elected as a deputy to the Assembly of the Republic in 2015 on the PSD list of candidates to represent the Porto constituency. She was re-elected in 2019 and 2022. Following the resignation of the Socialist prime minister António Costa, after allegations of corruption against members of his government, the PSD formed an alliance with two smaller parties to fight the March 2024 election, known as the Democratic Alliance (AD). Rocha was third on the list of the 14 AD candidates elected for the constituency. Following this election she became vice-president of the Assembly's Education and Science Committee, having also previously served on the Environment, Spatial Planning, Decentralization, Local Government and Housing Committee. In the May 2025 election, called after the government lost a confidence vote, she was again re-elected, as Number 6 on the AD list of candidates for the Porto constituency, being appointed to the Infrastructure, Mobility and Housing Committee.
