= Paulo Núncio =

Portuguese politician and lawyer (born 1968)

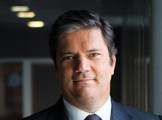
- Paulo Núncio in 2017

Member of the Assembly of the Republic
- Incumbent
- Assumed office 26 March 2024
- Constituency: Lisbon

Vice President of the CDS – People's Party
- Incumbent
- Assumed office 3 April 2022
- President: Nuno Melo
- Preceded by: Filipe Lobo d'Ávila

Secretary of State for Fiscal Affairs
- In office 21 June 2011 – 26 November 2015
- Prime Minister: Pedro Passos Coelho
- Minister: Vítor Gaspar; Maria Luís Albuquerque
- Preceded by: Sérgio Vasques
- Succeeded by: Fernando Rocha Andrade

Personal details
- Born: Paulo de Faria Lynce Núncio; 23 January 1968 (age 58) Lisbon, Portugal
- Party: CDS – People's Party (1989–present)
- Spouse: Marta Roque
- Children: 4
- Relatives: João Branco Núncio (uncle); Pedro Lynce (cousin)
- Education: Catholic University of Portugal
- Occupation: Lawyer • politician

Paulo de Faria Lynce Núncio (born 23 January 1968) is a Portuguese lawyer and politician, who was Secretary of State for Fiscal Affairs of Portugal from 2011 and 2015.

He is also a lawyer who since 1994 had specialized in Tax law, having developed his activity in the area of national and international taxation.

He began his political career in 1989 in the CDS-PP. He was a member of the executive committee of the CDS-PP between 2005 and 2007 and between 2014 and 2016. He is currently the vice President of the party since 2022.

In January 2024, he was announced as fourth place on the Party lists for the 2024 Portuguese legislative election, of Democratic Alliance's Lisbon list for the 2024 Portuguese legislative election. Núncio, alongside João Almeida, are the two MPs of the CDS-PP.
