= Rui Paulo Sousa =

Portuguese politician

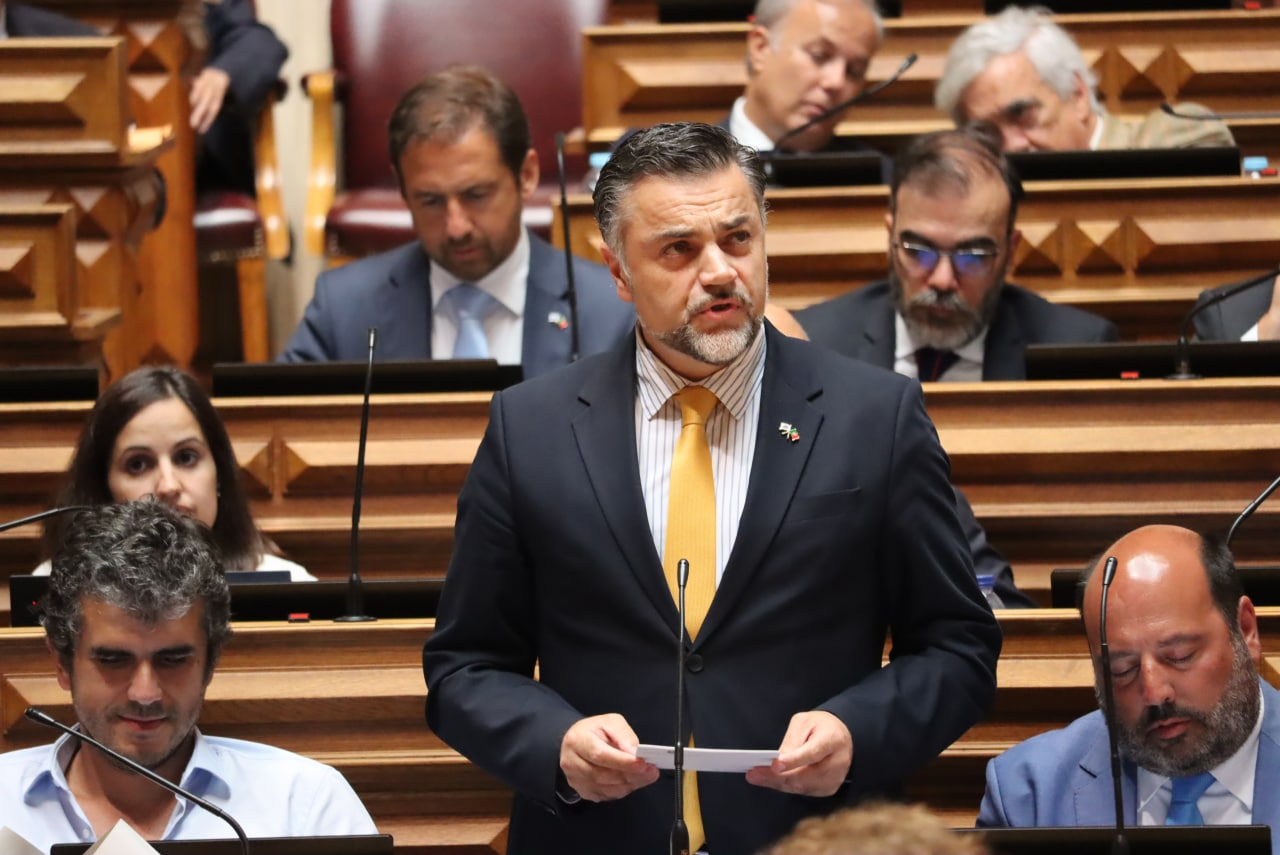

Vice President of the Parliamentary Caucus of CHEGA
- Incumbent
- Assumed office June 2, 2022

Member of the Assembly of the Republic
- Incumbent
- Assumed office March 29, 2022
- Constituency: Lisbon

Personal details
- Born: Rui Paulo Sousa; 22 November 1967 (age 58) Castelo Branco, Portugal
- Party: CHEGA (since 2020)
- Other political affiliations: Alliance (2018–2020)

Rui Paulo Sousa (born 22 November 1967) is a Portuguese businessman and politician for the Chega party. In 2022, he was elected to the Assembly of the Republic and represents the Lisbon constituency. Sousa was born in 1967 in Castelo Branco. He graduated with a degree in business administration and worked for an IT company before founding an agricultural business with a colleague called Villabosque.

He was initially a supporter of the CDS – People's Party but began his political career as a member of Alliance party. He unsuccessfully stood for the Alliance party during the 2019 Portuguese legislative election. He joined Chega in 2020 having been introduced into the party by its leader André Ventura. For the 2022 Portuguese legislative election, he stood as number two on Chega's electoral list and was elected to the Lisbon constituency. In the Assembly, he sits on the committees for finance, defense and the budget. He is also vice-president of the Chega parliamentary group.
