= Assembly of the Republic (Portugal) =

Unicameral legislature of Portugal

Assembly of the Republic Assembleia da República
- 17th legislature
- Emblem and flag of the parliament

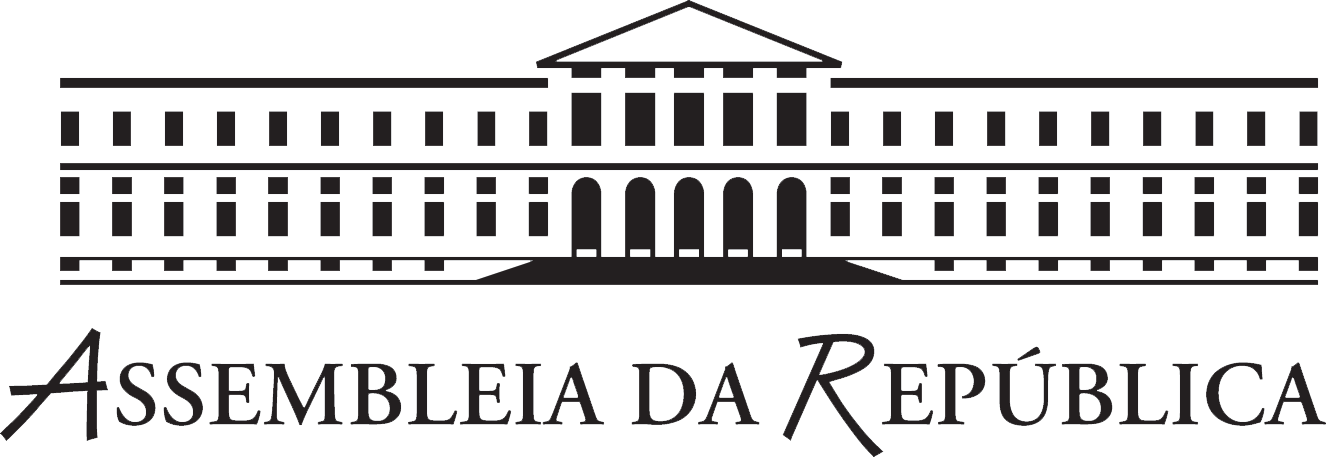
- Logo of the parliament

Type
- Type: Unicameral
- Term limits: None

History
- Founded: April 25, 1976
- Preceded by: Constituent Assembly
- New session started: 3 June 2025

Leadership
- President: José Pedro Aguiar-Branco, PPD/PSD since 27 March 2024
- Vice Presidents: Teresa Morais (PPD/PSD); Diogo Pacheco de Amorim (CH); Marcos Perestrello (PS); Rodrigo Saraiva (IL)

Structure
- Seats: 230
- Political groups: Government (XXV) (91): PPD/PSD (89); CDS–PP (2); Opposition (139): CH (60); PS (58); IL (9); LIVRE (6); PCP (3); BE (1); PAN (1); JPP (1)
- Length of term: 4 years

Elections
- Voting system: Closed list proportional representation; D'Hondt method
- First election: 25 April 1976
- Last election: 18 May 2025
- Next election: By 14 October 2029

Meeting place
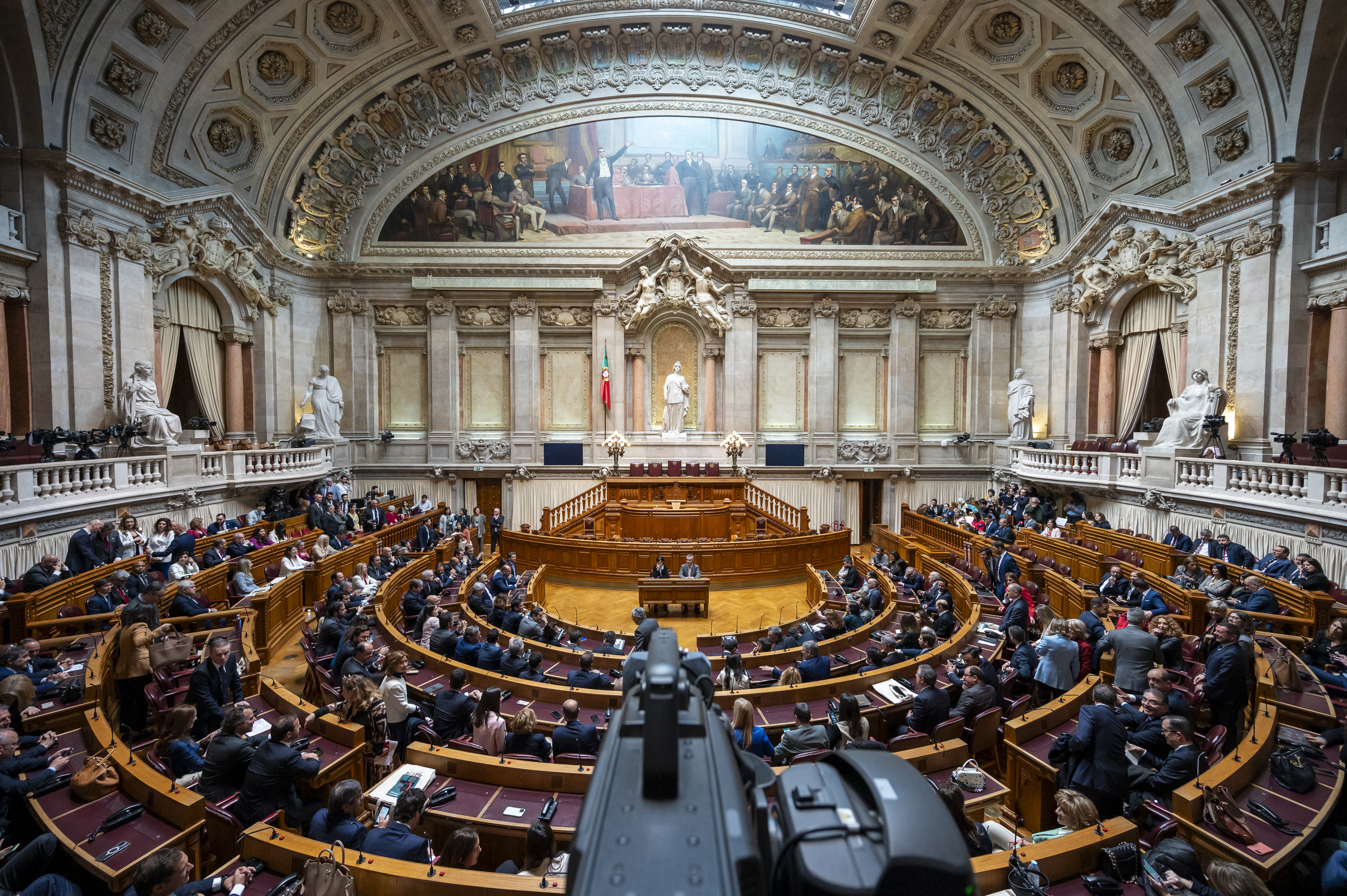
- São Bento Palace, Lisbon, Portugal

Website
- www.parlamento.pt

Constitution
- Constitution of Portugal - Part 3 - Title 3

The Assembly of the Republic (Portuguese: Assembleia da República, pronounced [ɐsẽˈblɐjɐ ðɐ ʁɛˈpuβlikɐ]), commonly referred to as simply Parliament (Portuguese: Parlamento), is the unicameral parliament of Portugal. According to the Constitution of Portugal, the parliament "is the representative assembly of all Portuguese citizens". The constitution names the assembly as one of the country's sovereignty bodies.

It meets in São Bento Palace, the historical site of an old Benedictine monastery. The palace has been the seat of the Portuguese parliaments since 1834 (Cortes until 1910, Congress from 1911 to 1926 and National Assembly from 1933 to 1974).

== Powers and duties of the Assembly ==
The Assembly of the Republic's powers derive from its ability to dismiss a government through a vote of no confidence, to change the country's laws, and to amend the constitution (which requires a majority of two-thirds). In addition to these key powers, the constitution grants to the Assembly extensive legislative powers and substantial control over the budget, the right to authorize the government to raise taxes and grant loans, the power to ratify treaties and other kinds of international agreements, and the duty to approve or reject decisions by the President of the Republic to declare war and make peace. The assembly also appoints many members of important state institutions, such as ten of the thirteen members of the Constitutional Court and seven of the sixteen members of the Council of State.

The constitution requires the assembly to quickly review and approve an incoming government's program. Parliamentary rules allow the assembly to call for committees of inquiry to examine the government's actions. Political opposition represented in the assembly has the power to review the cabinet's actions, even though it is unlikely that the actions can be reversed. Party groups can also call for interpellations that require debates about specific government policies.

== Structure ==
The assembly has 230 MPs. It originally consisted of 250 MPs, but the constitutional reforms of 1989 reduced its number to between 180 and 230. Members are elected by popular vote for legislative terms of four years from the country's twenty-two constituencies. There are eighteen in mainland Portugal corresponding to each district, one each for the autonomous regions of Azores (Portuguese: Açores) and Madeira, and two for Portuguese people living abroad (one covering European countries and one covering the rest of the world). Except for the constituencies for Portuguese living abroad, which are fixed at two representatives each, the number of MPs is determined by the number of voters registered in a constituency, using the D'Hondt method of proportional representation. Constituencies vary greatly in size; from as large as Lisbon, which elects 48 representatives, to as small as Portalegre, which elects just two.

For the 2025 legislative elections, the MPs were distributed by constituencies as follows:

Constituency	Number of MPs	Map
Lisbon	48	
Porto	40	
Braga and Setúbal	19 each	
Aveiro	16	
Leiria	10	
Coimbra, Faro and Santarém	9 each	
Viseu	8	
Madeira	6	
Azores, Viana do Castelo and Vila Real	5 each	
Castelo Branco	4	
Beja, Bragança, Évora and Guarda	3 each	
Portalegre, Europe and Outside Europe	2 each	

According to the constitution, members of the assembly represent the entire country, not the constituency from which they are elected. This directive has been reinforced in practice by the strong role of political parties in regard to members of the assembly. Party leadership, for example, determines in which areas candidates are to run for office, thus often weakening members' ties to their constituencies. Moreover, members of the assembly are expected to vote with their party and to work within parliamentary groups based on party membership. Party discipline is strong, and insubordinate members can be coerced through a variety of means. A further obstacle to members' independence is that their bills first have to be submitted to the parliamentary groups, and it is these groups' leaders who set the assembly's agenda.

The President of the Assembly of the Republic is the second hierarchical figure in the Portuguese state, after the President of the Portuguese Republic, and is elected by secret vote of the members of parliament. The President of the Assembly is aided by four vice presidents, nominated by the other parties represented in the parliament, and is usually the speaker. When they are not present, one of the vice presidents takes the role of speaker. When the President of the Republic is, for any reason, unable to perform the job, the President of the Assembly of the Republic becomes the substitute.

== Current composition ==
Current seat composition by party, and their respective parliamentary leaders, since the beginning of the current legislature:

Party	Parliamentary group leader	Seats	%
Social Democratic Party	Hugo Soares	89	38.7
Chega	Pedro Pinto	60	26.1
Socialist Party	Eurico Brilhante Dias	58	25.2
Liberal Initiative	Mário Amorim Lopes	9	3.9
LIVRE	Isabel Mendes Lopes	6	2.6
Portuguese Communist Party	Paula Santos	3	1.3
CDS - People's Party	Paulo Núncio	2	0.9
Left Bloc	Fabian Figueiredo	1	0.4
People-Animals-Nature	Inês Sousa Real	1	0.4
Together for the People	Filipe Sousa	1	0.4
Total		230	100.0

== Latest election result ==
Party or alliance		Votes	%	+/–	Seats	+/–
AD – PSD/CDS Coalition	AD – PSD/CDS Coalition (Note: Compared with the 2024 Democratic Alliance (PSD/CDS/PPM))	1,971,602	31.20	+3.02	88	+10
AD – PSD/CDS Coalition	Coalition PSD/CDS/PPM (Note: Only in Azores.)	36,886	0.58	–0.07	3	+1
AD – PSD/CDS Coalition	Total	2,008,488	31.78	+2.95	91	+11
Socialist Party		1,442,546	22.83	–5.15	58	–20
Chega		1,438,554	22.76	+4.73	60	+10
Liberal Initiative		338,974	5.36	+0.42	9	+1
LIVRE		257,291	4.07	+0.91	6	+2
Unitary Democratic Coalition		183,686	2.91	–0.26	3	–1
Left Bloc		125,808	1.99	–2.37	1	–4
People Animals Nature		86,930	1.38	–0.57	1	0
National Democratic Alternative		81,660	1.29	–0.29	0	0
Together for the People		20,900	0.33	+0.03	1	+1
React, Include, Recycle		14,021	0.22	–0.18	0	0
Volt Portugal		12,150	0.19	+0.01	0	0
Portuguese Workers' Communist Party		11,896	0.19	–0.05	0	0
Nova Direita		10,216	0.16	–0.09	0	0
Ergue-te		9,046	0.14	+0.05	0	0
Liberal Social Party		7,332	0.12	New	0	New
People's Monarchist Party		5,616	0.09	+0.08	0	0
We, the Citizens!		3,304	0.05	+0.01	0	0
Earth Party (Note: Compared with the 2024 Alternative 21 coalition (MPT/Alliance).)		478	0.01	–0.06	0	0
Portuguese Labour Party		425	0.01	–0.03	0	0
Total		6,059,321	100.00	–	230	0
Valid votes		6,059,321	95.88	+0.24		
Invalid votes		172,994	2.74	–0.23		
Blank votes		87,654	1.39	–0.00		
Total votes		6,319,969	100.00	–		
Registered voters/turnout		10,848,816	58.25	–1.65		
Source: Comissão Nacional de Eleições

== Elected Composition of the Assembly of the Republic since 1975 ==
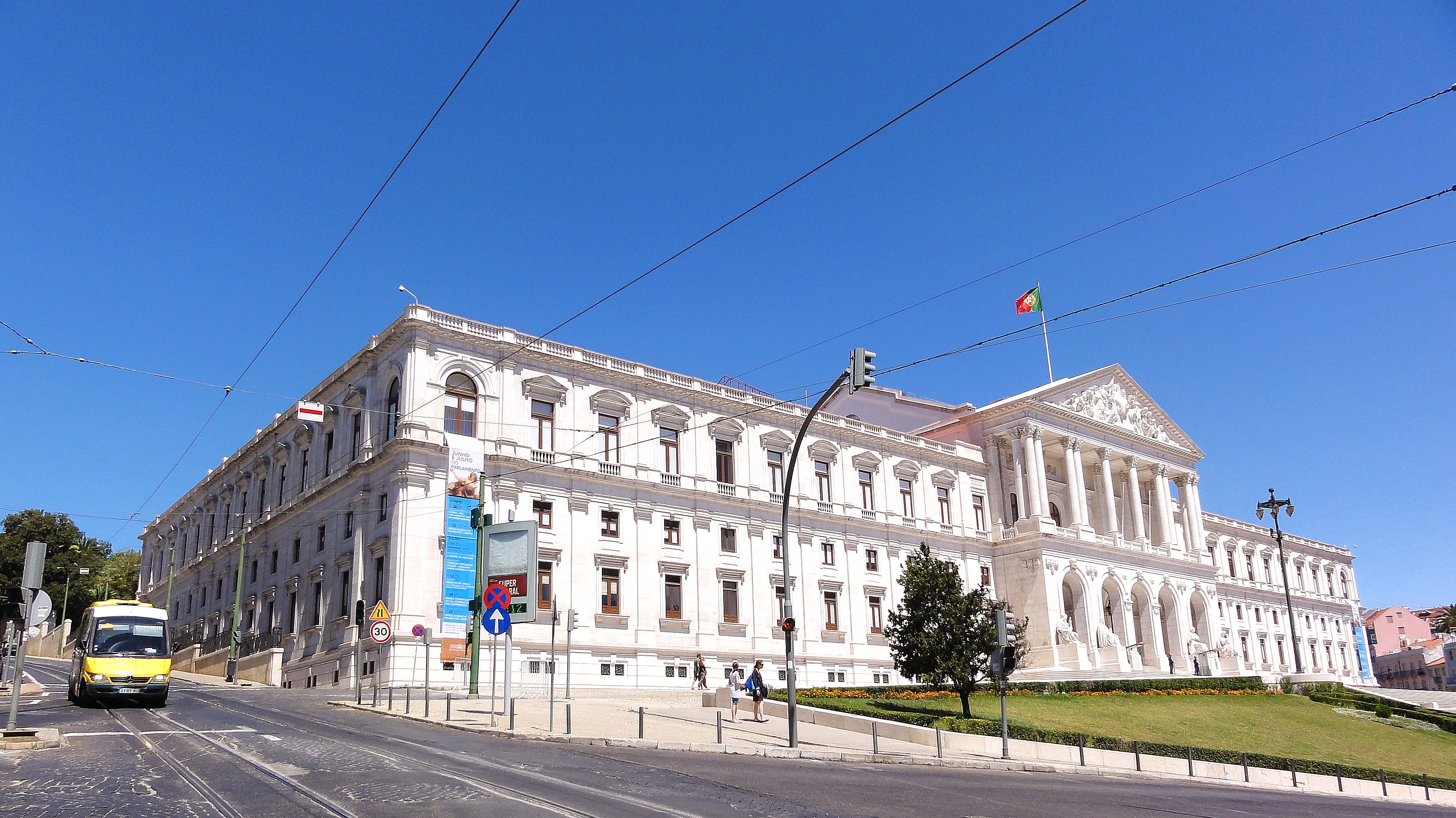
São Bento Palace, seat of the Assembly of the Republic

Legislatures since 1975
Election	No.	Parliament	Parties represented		Term
Election	No.	Parliament	Government	Opposition	Term
Constituent; 1975			PS (116); PPD (81); PCP (30); CDS (16); MDP (5); UDP (1); ADIM (1)		1975–1976
1976	1st		PS (107)	PPD (73); CDS (42); PCP (40); UDP (1)	1976–1978
1976	1st		PS (107); CDS (42)	PPD/PSD (73); PCP (40); UDP (1)	1978
1976	1st		Presidential appointed governments	PS (107); PPD/PSD (73); CDS (42); PCP (40); UDP (1)	1978–1979
1979	1st		PPD/PSD (80); CDS (43); PPM (5)	PS (74); PCP (44); MDP (3); UDP (1)	1979–1980
1980	2nd		PPD/PSD (82); CDS (46); PPM (6)	PS (66); PCP (39); UEDS (4); ASDI (4); MDP (2); UDP (1)	1980–1983
1983	3rd		PS (94); PPD/PSD (75); UEDS (4); ASDI (3)	PCP (41); CDS (30); MDP (3)	1983–1985
1985	4th		PPD/PSD (88); PRD (45) (Note: Confidence & supply gov't); CDS (22)	PS (57); PCP (35); MDP (3)	1985–1987
1987	5th		PPD/PSD (148)	PS (60); PCP (29); PRD (7); CDS (4); PEV (2)	1987–1991
1991	6th		PPD/PSD (135)	PS (72); PCP (15); CDS (5); PEV (2); PSN (1)	1991–1995
1995	7th		PS (112)	PPD/PSD (88); CDS–PP (15); PCP (13); PEV (2)	1995–1999
1999	8th		PS (115)	PPD/PSD (81); CDS–PP (15); PCP (15); PEV (2); BE (2)	1999–2002
2002	9th		PPD/PSD (105); CDS–PP (14)	PS (96); PCP (10); BE (3); PEV (2)	2002–2005
2005	10th		PS (121)	PPD/PSD (75); CDS–PP (12); PCP (12); BE (8); PEV (2)	2005–2009
2009	11th		PS (97)	PPD/PSD (81); CDS–PP (21); BE (16); PCP (13); PEV (2)	2009–2011
2011	12th		PPD/PSD (108); CDS–PP (24)	PS (74); PCP (14); BE (8); PEV (2)	2011–2015
2015	13th		PPD/PSD (89); CDS–PP (18)	PS (86); BE (19); PCP (15); PEV (2); PAN (1)	2015
2015	13th		PS (86); BE (19); PCP (15); PEV (2)	PPD/PSD (89); CDS–PP (18); PAN (1)	2015–2019
2019	14th		PS (108)	PPD/PSD (79); BE (19); PCP (10); CDS–PP (5); PAN (4); PEV (2); CH (1); IL (1); L (1)	2019–2022
2022	15th		PS (120)	PPD/PSD (77); CH (12); IL (8); PCP (6); BE (5); PAN (1); L (1)	2022–2024
2024	16th		PPD/PSD (78); CDS–PP (2)	PS (78); CH (50); IL (8); BE (5); PCP (4); L (4); PAN (1)	2024–2025
2025	17th		PPD/PSD (89); CDS–PP (2)	CH (60); PS (58); IL (9); L (6); PCP (3); BE (1); PAN (1); JPP (1)	2025–

=== Evolution graphic ===
- CH
- ADIM
- PPM
- CDS-PP
- IL
- PSN
- MPT
- PPD/PSD
- ASDI
- PRD
- JPP
- PAN
- PS
- UEDS
- L
- PCP
- PEV
- BE
- MDP
- UDP

== See also ==
- São Bento Palace
- ARtv (Portugal)
- Legislative Assembly of Madeira
- Legislative Assembly of the Azores
