= Porto (Assembly of the Republic constituency) =

Constituency of the Assembly of the Republic, the national legislature of Portugal

- Constituency for the Assembly of the Republic
- Location of Porto within Portugal
- District: Porto
- Population: 1,860,255 (2024)
- Electorate: 1,591,357 (2025)
- Area: 2,332 km^{2} (2024)

Current Constituency
- Created: 1976
- Seats: List: 40 (2019–present); 39 (2009–2019); 38 (2002–2009); 37 (1991–2002); 39 (1985–1991); 38 (1976–1985)
- Deputies: List: Rui Afonso (CH); João Pinho de Almeida (CDS-PP); Diogo Pacheco de Amorim (CH); Sofia Andrade (PS); José Carlos Barbosa (PS); Carla Barros (PSD); Humberto Brito (PS); Ana Gabriela Cabilhas (PSD); Gonçalo Dinis Capitão (PSD); Hugo Carneiro (PSD); José Carvalho (CH); Idalina Durães (CH); Patrícia Faro (PS); Ana Isabel Ferreira (PSD); Alberto Fonseca (PSD); Olga Freire (PSD); Miguel Guimarães (PSD); Joana Lima (PS); Francisco Covelinhas Lopes (PSD); Alberto Machado (PSD); Alfredo Maia (PCP); Raul Melo (CH); Dália Miranda (PS); Sónia Monteiro (CH); Patrícia Nascimento (CH); Andreia Neto (PSD); Rui Rocha Pereira (PSD); Sofia Pereira (PS); Eduardo Pinheiro (PS); Carlos Guimarães Pinto (IL); Filipa Pinto (L); Jorge Pinto (L); Miguel Rangel (IL); Tiago Barbosa Ribeiro (PS); Germana Rocha (PSD); Cristina Rodrigues (CH); Marcus Santos (CH); Porfírio Silva (PS); João Torres (PS); Francisco Sousa Vieira (PSD)

Porto is one of the 22 multi-member constituencies of the Assembly of the Republic, the national legislature of Portugal. The constituency was established in 1976 when the Assembly of the Republic was established by the constitution following the restoration of democracy. It is conterminous with the district of Porto. The constituency currently elects 40 of the 230 members of the Assembly of the Republic using the closed party-list proportional representation electoral system. At the 2025 legislative election it had 1,591,357 registered electors.

== Electoral system ==
Porto currently elects 40 of the 230 members of the Assembly of the Republic using the closed party-list proportional representation electoral system. Seats are allocated using the D'Hondt method.

== Election results ==
=== Summary ===
| Election | Unitary Democrats CDU / APU / PCP | | | Left Bloc BE / UDP | | | LIVRE L | | | Socialists PS / FRS | | | People Animals Nature PAN | | | Democratic Renewal PRD | | | Social Democrats PSD / PàF / AD / PPD | | | Liberals IL | | | CDS – People's CDS–PP / CDS | | | Chega CH / PPV/CDC / PPV | | |
| Election | Votes | % | Seats | Votes | % | Seats | Votes | % | Seats | Votes | % | Seats | Votes | % | Seats | Votes | % | Seats | Votes | % | Seats | Votes | % | Seats | Votes | % | Seats | Votes | % | Seats |
|---|---|---|---|---|---|---|---|---|---|---|---|---|---|---|---|---|---|---|---|---|---|---|---|---|---|---|---|---|---|---|
| 2025 | 24,985 | 2.33% | 1 | 22,219 | 2.07% | 0 | 47,232 | 4.40% | 2 | 263,792 | 24.57% | 11 | 16,402 | 1.53% | 0 | | | | 375,731 | 34.99% | 15 | 67,076 | 6.25% | 2 | | | | 227,009 | 21.14% | 9 |
| 2024 | 26,356 | 2.42% | 1 | 51,917 | 4.76% | 2 | 37,321 | 3.43% | 1 | 338,110 | 31.03% | 13 | 23,421 | 2.15% | 0 | | | | 339,142 | 31.13% | 14 | 64,065 | 5.88% | 2 | | | | 170,936 | 15.69% | 7 |
| 2022 | 32,278 | 3.34% | 1 | 47,134 | 4.88% | 2 | 11,438 | 1.18% | 0 | 418,958 | 43.34% | 19 | 16,722 | 1.73% | 0 | | | | 318,390 | 32.94% | 14 | 50,389 | 5.21% | 2 | 14,353 | 1.48% | 0 | 43,004 | 4.45% | 2 |
| 2019 | 44,944 | 5.00% | 2 | 94,646 | 10.53% | 4 | 8,929 | 0.99% | 0 | 342,727 | 38.15% | 17 | 32,331 | 3.60% | 1 | | | | 291,312 | 32.42% | 15 | 14,238 | 1.58% | 0 | 31,145 | 3.47% | 1 | 5,704 | 0.63% | 0 |
| 2015 | 65,597 | 7.08% | 3 | 106,887 | 11.53% | 5 | 5,012 | 0.54% | 0 | 314,121 | 33.89% | 14 | 15,307 | 1.65% | 0 | | | | 380,069 | 41.00% | 17 | | | | | | | | | |
| 2011 | 61,832 | 6.46% | 2 | 51,002 | 5.33% | 2 | | | | 318,113 | 33.26% | 14 | 9,072 | 0.95% | 0 | | | | 389,007 | 40.67% | 17 | | | | 99,395 | 10.39% | 4 | 1,098 | 0.11% | 0 |
| 2009 | 57,597 | 5.85% | 2 | 92,962 | 9.45% | 3 | | | | 422,558 | 42.94% | 18 | | | | | | | 294,398 | 29.91% | 12 | | | | 93,856 | 9.54% | 4 | 2,152 | 0.22% | 0 |
| 2005 | 54,282 | 5.57% | 2 | 66,912 | 6.87% | 2 | | | | 485,975 | 49.91% | 20 | | | | | | | 278,381 | 28.59% | 12 | | | | 68,824 | 7.07% | 2 | | | |
| 2002 | 43,272 | 4.70% | 1 | 25,195 | 2.74% | 1 | | | | 386,004 | 41.95% | 17 | | | | | | | 375,204 | 40.78% | 16 | | | | 79,034 | 8.59% | 3 | | | |
| 1999 | 57,138 | 6.35% | 2 | 21,374 | 2.38% | 0 | | | | 439,176 | 48.82% | 19 | | | | | | | 298,910 | 33.23% | 13 | | | | 68,951 | 7.67% | 3 | | | |
| 1995 | 60,178 | 6.11% | 2 | 2,883 | 0.29% | 0 | | | | 467,512 | 47.44% | 18 | | | | | | | 364,019 | 36.94% | 14 | | | | 77,602 | 7.87% | 3 | | | |
| 1991 | 60,666 | 6.47% | 2 | | | | | | | 313,893 | 33.47% | 13 | | | | 4,437 | 0.47% | 0 | 489,247 | 52.17% | 21 | | | | 38,882 | 4.15% | 1 | | | |
| 1987 | 87,335 | 9.52% | 4 | 6,169 | 0.67% | 0 | | | | 249,443 | 27.19% | 11 | | | | 37,581 | 4.10% | 1 | 475,410 | 51.83% | 22 | | | | 36,997 | 4.03% | 1 | | | |
| 1985 | 111,272 | 12.33% | 5 | 9,846 | 1.09% | 0 | | | | 217,356 | 24.09% | 10 | | | | 188,751 | 20.92% | 8 | 270,526 | 29.99% | 12 | | | | 89,976 | 9.97% | 4 | | | |
| 1983 | 121,181 | 13.86% | 5 | | | | | | | 383,485 | 43.86% | 18 | | | | | | | 233,615 | 26.72% | 10 | | | | 111,007 | 12.70% | 5 | | | |
| 1980 | 110,013 | 12.15% | 5 | 12,592 | 1.39% | 0 | | | | 316,032 | 34.90% | 14 | | | | | | | 429,685 | 47.45% | 19 | | | | | | | | | |
| 1979 | 131,833 | 14.75% | 6 | 17,297 | 1.93% | 0 | | | | 317,078 | 35.47% | 14 | | | | | | | 405,060 | 45.31% | 18 | | | | | | | | | |
| 1976 | 69,176 | 8.74% | 3 | 12,590 | 1.59% | 0 | | | | 336,960 | 42.56% | 18 | | | | | | | 222,974 | 28.17% | 11 | | | | 129,732 | 16.39% | 6 | | | |

(Figures in italics represent alliances.)

=== Detailed ===
==== 2020s ====
===== 2025 =====
Results of the 2025 legislative election held on 18 May 2025:

| Party | | Votes | % | Seats |
|---|---|---|---|---|
| Democratic Alliance | AD | 375,731 | 34.99% | 15 |
| Socialist Party | PS | 263,792 | 24.57% | 11 |
| Chega | CH | 227,009 | 21.14% | 9 |
| Liberal Initiative | IL | 67,076 | 6.25% | 2 |
| LIVRE | L | 47,232 | 4.40% | 2 |
| Unitary Democratic Coalition | CDU | 24,985 | 2.33% | 1 |
| Left Bloc | BE | 22,219 | 2.07% | 0 |
| People Animals Nature | PAN | 16,402 | 1.53% | 0 |
| National Democratic Alternative | ADN | 11,283 | 1.05% | 0 |
| React, Include, Recycle | RIR | 3,945 | 0.37% | 0 |
| Liberal Social Party | PLS | 3,597 | 0.33% | 0 |
| Volt Portugal | Volt | 2,479 | 0.23% | 0 |
| Portuguese Workers' Communist Party | PCTP | 2,142 | 0.20% | 0 |
| New Right | ND | 1,807 | 0.17% | 0 |
| Ergue-te | E | 1,630 | 0.15% | 0 |
| We, the Citizens! | NC | 1,106 | 0.10% | 0 |
| Together for the People | JPP | 731 | 0.07% | 0 |
| People's Monarchist Party | PPM | 572 | 0.05% | 0 |
| Valid votes | | 1,073,738 | 100.00% | 40 |
| Blank votes | | 14,390 | 1.31% | |
| Rejected votes – other | | 9,381 | 0.85% | |
| Total polled | | 1,097,509 | 68.97% | |
| Registered electors | | 1,591,357 | | |

The following candidates were elected:: Rui Afonso (CH); Carlos Abreu Amorim (AD); Diogo Pacheco de Amorim (CH); Fernando Araújo (PS); José Carlos Barbosa (PS); Carla Barros (AD); Humberto Brito (PS); Ana Gabriela Cabilhas (AD); Hugo Carneiro (AD); José Carvalho (CH); Idalina Durães (CH); Patrícia Faro (PS); Olga Freire (AD); Miguel Guimarães (AD); Joana Lima (PS); Francisco Covelinhas Lopes (AD); Alberto Machado (AD); Alfredo Maia (CDU); Nuno Melo (AD); Raul Melo (CH); Dália Miranda (PS); Sónia Monteiro (CH); Patrícia Nascimento (CH); Andreia Neto (AD); Rui Rocha Pereira (AD); Sofia Pereira (PS); Eduardo Pinheiro (PS); Carlos Guimarães Pinto (IL); Filipa Pinto (L); Jorge Pinto (L); Miguel Rangel (IL); Paulo Rangel (AD); Tiago Barbosa Ribeiro (PS); Germana Rocha (AD); Cristina Rodrigues (CH); Alberto S. Santos (AD); Marcus Santos (CH); Porfírio Silva (PS); João Torres (PS); and Francisco Sousa Vieira (AD).

===== 2024 =====
Results of the 2024 legislative election held on 10 March 2024:

| Party | | Votes | % | Seats |
|---|---|---|---|---|
| Democratic Alliance | AD | 339,142 | 31.13% | 14 |
| Socialist Party | PS | 338,110 | 31.03% | 13 |
| Chega | CH | 170,936 | 15.69% | 7 |
| Liberal Initiative | IL | 64,065 | 5.88% | 2 |
| Left Bloc | BE | 51,917 | 4.76% | 2 |
| LIVRE | L | 37,321 | 3.43% | 1 |
| Unitary Democratic Coalition | CDU | 26,356 | 2.42% | 1 |
| People Animals Nature | PAN | 23,421 | 2.15% | 0 |
| National Democratic Alternative | ADN | 19,585 | 1.80% | 0 |
| React, Include, Recycle | RIR | 9,163 | 0.84% | 0 |
| Portuguese Workers' Communist Party | PCTP | 3,446 | 0.32% | 0 |
| New Right | ND | 1,786 | 0.16% | 0 |
| Volt Portugal | Volt | 1,646 | 0.15% | 0 |
| Together for the People | JPP | 1,152 | 0.11% | 0 |
| We, the Citizens! | NC | 790 | 0.07% | 0 |
| Ergue-te | E | 738 | 0.07% | 0 |
| Valid votes | | 1,089,574 | 100.00% | 40 |
| Blank votes | | 14,407 | 1.29% | |
| Rejected votes – other | | 10,964 | 0.98% | |
| Total polled | | 1,114,945 | 70.04% | |
| Registered electors | | 1,591,760 | | |

The following candidates were elected: Óscar Afonso (AD); Rui Afonso (CH); Diogo Pacheco de Amorim (CH); Sofia Andrade (PS); Francisco de Assis (PS); José Carlos Barbosa (PS); Carlos Brás (PS); Ana Gabriela Cabilhas (AD); Hugo Carneiro (AD); José Carvalho (CH); João Paulo Correia (PS); Patrícia Faro (PS); Alberto Fonseca (AD); Olga Freire (AD); Rosário Gambôa (PS); Patrícia Gilvaz (IL); Miguel Guimarães (AD); Joana Lima (PS); Francisco Covelinhas Lopes (AD); Alberto Machado (AD); Alfredo Maia (CDU); Marisa Matias (BE); Nuno Melo (AD); Raul Melo (CH); Sónia Monteiro (CH); Andreia Neto (AD); Isabel Oneto (PS); Eduardo Pinheiro (PS); Carlos Guimarães Pinto (IL); Jorge Pinto (L); Manuel Pizarro (PS); Tiago Barbosa Ribeiro (PS); Germana Rocha (AD); Cristina Rodrigues (CH); Pedro Roque (AD); Marcus Santos (CH); José Soeiro (BE); Pedro Neves de Sousa (AD); João Torres (PS); and Francisco Sousa Vieira (AD).

===== 2022 =====
Results of the 2022 legislative election held on 30 January 2022:

| Party | | Votes | % | Seats |
|---|---|---|---|---|
| Socialist Party | PS | 418,958 | 43.34% | 19 |
| Social Democratic Party | PSD | 318,390 | 32.94% | 14 |
| Liberal Initiative | IL | 50,389 | 5.21% | 2 |
| Left Bloc | BE | 47,134 | 4.88% | 2 |
| Chega | CH | 43,004 | 4.45% | 2 |
| Unitary Democratic Coalition | CDU | 32,278 | 3.34% | 1 |
| People Animals Nature | PAN | 16,722 | 1.73% | 0 |
| CDS – People's Party | CDS–PP | 14,353 | 1.48% | 0 |
| LIVRE | L | 11,438 | 1.18% | 0 |
| React, Include, Recycle | RIR | 7,212 | 0.75% | 0 |
| National Democratic Alternative | ADN | 1,431 | 0.15% | 0 |
| Ergue-te | E | 1,008 | 0.10% | 0 |
| We, the Citizens! | NC | 909 | 0.09% | 0 |
| Volt Portugal | Volt | 893 | 0.09% | 0 |
| Socialist Alternative Movement | MAS | 708 | 0.07% | 0 |
| Earth Party | PT | 705 | 0.07% | 0 |
| Portuguese Labour Party | PTP | 423 | 0.04% | 0 |
| Alliance | A | 378 | 0.04% | 0 |
| Together for the People | JPP | 367 | 0.04% | 0 |
| Valid votes | | 966,700 | 100.00% | 40 |
| Blank votes | | 10,015 | 1.02% | |
| Rejected votes – other | | 8,122 | 0.82% | |
| Total polled | | 984,837 | 61.98% | |
| Registered electors | | 1,589,053 | | |

The following candidates were elected: Rui Afonso (CH); Diogo Pacheco de Amorim (CH); Sofia Andrade (PS); José Carlos Barbosa (PS); Ana Bernardo (PS); Carlos Brás (PS); Hugo Carneiro (PSD); Hugo Carvalho (PS); João Paulo Correia (PS); Patrícia Faro (PS); João Pedro Matos Fernandes (PS); Catarina Rocha Ferreira (PSD); Diana Ferreira (CDU); Rosário Gambôa (PS); Patrícia Gilvaz (IL); Rui Lage (PS); Joana Lima (PS); Pedro Melo Lopes (PSD); Catarina Martins (BE); Sofia Matos (PSD); Joaquim Pinto Moreira (PSD); Andreia Neto (PSD); Afonso Oliveira (PSD); Paulo Rios de Oliveira (PSD); Isabel Oneto (PS); Márcia Passos (PSD); Firmino Pereira (PSD); Eduardo Pinheiro (PS); Carlos Guimarães Pinto (IL); Alexandre Quintanilha (PS); Paulo Ramalho (PSD); Tiago Barbosa Ribeiro (PS); Rui Rio (PSD); Germana Rocha (PSD); Miguel dos Santos Rodrigues (PS); Miguel Santos (PSD); Cristina Mendes da Silva (PS); José Soeiro (BE); Carla Sousa (PS); and João Torres (PS).

==== 2010s ====
===== 2019 =====
Results of the 2019 legislative election held on 6 October 2019:

| Party | | Votes | % | Seats |
|---|---|---|---|---|
| Socialist Party | PS | 342,727 | 38.15% | 17 |
| Social Democratic Party | PSD | 291,312 | 32.42% | 15 |
| Left Bloc | BE | 94,646 | 10.53% | 4 |
| Unitary Democratic Coalition | CDU | 44,944 | 5.00% | 2 |
| People Animals Nature | PAN | 32,331 | 3.60% | 1 |
| CDS – People's Party | CDS–PP | 31,145 | 3.47% | 1 |
| Liberal Initiative | IL | 14,238 | 1.58% | 0 |
| React, Include, Recycle | RIR | 10,573 | 1.18% | 0 |
| LIVRE | L | 8,929 | 0.99% | 0 |
| Chega | CH | 5,704 | 0.63% | 0 |
| Portuguese Workers' Communist Party | PCTP | 5,054 | 0.56% | 0 |
| Alliance | A | 4,351 | 0.48% | 0 |
| National Renewal Party | PNR | 1,936 | 0.22% | 0 |
| United Party of Retirees and Pensioners | PURP | 1,897 | 0.21% | 0 |
| Earth Party | PT | 1,735 | 0.19% | 0 |
| We, the Citizens! | NC | 1,634 | 0.18% | 0 |
| Democratic Republican Party | PDR | 1,440 | 0.16% | 0 |
| Portuguese Labour Party | PTP | 1,400 | 0.16% | 0 |
| Together for the People | JPP | 1,077 | 0.12% | 0 |
| People's Monarchist Party | PPM | 864 | 0.10% | 0 |
| Socialist Alternative Movement | MAS | 517 | 0.06% | 0 |
| Valid votes | | 898,454 | 100.00% | 40 |
| Blank votes | | 21,225 | 2.27% | |
| Rejected votes – other | | 15,083 | 1.61% | |
| Total polled | | 934,762 | 58.65% | |
| Registered electors | | 1,593,888 | | |

The following candidates were elected: Álvaro Almeida (PSD); Carla Barros (PSD); Hugo Carneiro (PSD); José Luís Carneiro (PS); Hugo Carvalho (PS); Hugo Martins de Carvalho (PSD); João Paulo Correia (PS); António Cunha (PSD); Bebiana Cunha (PAN); João Pedro Matos Fernandes (PS); Catarina Rocha Ferreira (PSD); Diana Ferreira (CDU); Alberto Fonseca (PSD); Rosário Gambôa (PS); Joana Lima (PS); Alberto Machado (PSD); José Magalhães (PS); Catarina Martins (BE); Sofia Matos (PSD); Cecília Meireles (CDS-PP); Ana Mesquita (CDU); Luís Monteiro (BE); José Cancela Moura (PSD); Afonso Oliveira (PSD); Paulo Rios de Oliveira (PSD); Isabel Oneto (PS); Márcia Passos (PSD); Alexandre Quintanilha (PS); Tiago Barbosa Ribeiro (PS); Rui Rio (PSD); Germana Rocha (PSD); Maria Manuel Rola (BE); Cristina Mendes da Silva (PS); José Soeiro (BE); Carla Sousa (PS); Constança Urbano de Sousa (PS); Pedro Sousa (PS); João Torres (PS); Pedro Bacelar de Vasconcelos (PS); and Ana Paula Vitorino (PS).

===== 2015 =====
Results of the 2015 legislative election held on 4 October 2015:

| Party | | Votes | % | Seats |
|---|---|---|---|---|
| Portugal Ahead | PàF | 380,069 | 41.00% | 17 |
| Socialist Party | PS | 314,121 | 33.89% | 14 |
| Left Bloc | BE | 106,887 | 11.53% | 5 |
| Unitary Democratic Coalition | CDU | 65,597 | 7.08% | 3 |
| People Animals Nature | PAN | 15,307 | 1.65% | 0 |
| Democratic Republican Party | PDR | 10,679 | 1.15% | 0 |
| Portuguese Workers' Communist Party | PCTP | 10,287 | 1.11% | 0 |
| LIVRE | L | 5,012 | 0.54% | 0 |
| National Renewal Party | PNR | 4,752 | 0.51% | 0 |
| The Earth Party Movement | MPT | 3,443 | 0.37% | 0 |
| ACT! (Portuguese Labour Party and Socialist Alternative Movement) | AGIR | 2,787 | 0.30% | 0 |
| We, the Citizens! | NC | 2,713 | 0.29% | 0 |
| People's Monarchist Party | PPM | 2,392 | 0.26% | 0 |
| United Party of Retirees and Pensioners | PURP | 1,614 | 0.17% | 0 |
| Together for the People | JPP | 1,231 | 0.13% | 0 |
| Valid votes | | 926,891 | 100.00% | 39 |
| Blank votes | | 18,926 | 1.97% | |
| Rejected votes – other | | 13,955 | 1.45% | |
| Total polled | | 959,772 | 60.31% | |
| Registered electors | | 1,591,407 | | |

The following candidates were elected: José Pedro Aguiar-Branco (PàF); Carla Barros (PàF); Ricardo Bexiga (PS); Jorge Campos (BE); Gabriela Canavilhas (PS); José Luís Carneiro (PS); Álvaro Castello-Branco (PàF); João Paulo Correia (PS); Domicilia Costa (BE); Marco António Costa (PàF); Diana Ferreira (CDU); Fernando Virgílio Macedo (PàF); Jorge Machado (CDU); Alberto Martins (PS); Catarina Martins (BE); Cecília Meireles (PàF); Luís Monteiro (BE); Miguel Morgado (PàF); Andreia Neto (PàF); Carlos Costa Neves (PàF); Paulo Rios de Oliveira (PàF); Isabel Oneto (PS); Ana Virgínia Pereira (CDU); Firmino Jorge Anjos Pereira (PàF); Alexandre Quintanilha (PS); Cristóvão Simão Ribeiro (PàF); Tiago Barbosa Ribeiro (PS); Germana Rocha (PàF); Luísa Salgueiro (PS); Renato Sampaio (PS); Emília Santos (PàF); Isabel Santos (PS); Miguel Santos (PàF); Pedro Mota Soares (PàF); José Soeiro (BE); João Torres (PS); Luís Vales (PàF); Pedro Bacelar de Vasconcelos (PS); and Ana Paula Vitorino (PS).

===== 2011 =====
Results of the 2011 legislative election held on 5 June 2011:

| Party | | Votes | % | Seats |
|---|---|---|---|---|
| Social Democratic Party | PSD | 389,007 | 40.67% | 17 |
| Socialist Party | PS | 318,113 | 33.26% | 14 |
| CDS – People's Party | CDS–PP | 99,395 | 10.39% | 4 |
| Unitary Democratic Coalition | CDU | 61,832 | 6.46% | 2 |
| Left Bloc | BE | 51,002 | 5.33% | 2 |
| Portuguese Workers' Communist Party | PCTP | 9,640 | 1.01% | 0 |
| Party for Animals and Nature | PAN | 9,072 | 0.95% | 0 |
| Portuguese Labour Party | PTP | 3,386 | 0.35% | 0 |
| Hope for Portugal Movement | MEP | 2,960 | 0.31% | 0 |
| The Earth Party Movement | MPT | 2,413 | 0.25% | 0 |
| Democratic Party of the Atlantic | PDA | 2,217 | 0.23% | 0 |
| National Renewal Party | PNR | 1,551 | 0.16% | 0 |
| New Democracy Party | ND | 1,550 | 0.16% | 0 |
| People's Monarchist Party | PPM | 1,525 | 0.16% | 0 |
| Humanist Party | PH | 1,194 | 0.12% | 0 |
| Pro-Life Party | PPV | 1,098 | 0.11% | 0 |
| Workers' Party of Socialist Unity | POUS | 515 | 0.05% | 0 |
| Valid votes | | 956,470 | 100.00% | 39 |
| Blank votes | | 24,736 | 2.49% | |
| Rejected votes – other | | 12,296 | 1.24% | |
| Total polled | | 993,502 | 63.26% | |
| Registered electors | | 1,570,585 | | |

The following candidates were elected: José Pedro Aguiar-Branco (PSD); João Pinho de Almeida (CDS-PP); Margarida Almeida (PSD); Francisco Assis (PS); Maria José Castelo Branco (PSD); Júlio Miranda Calha (PS); José Ribeiro e Castro (CDS-PP); Teresa Leal Coelho (PSD); Luís Campos Ferreira (PSD); Nuno André Figueiredo (PS); Miguel Frasquilho (PSD); Fernando Jesus (PS); José Lello (PS); Fernando Virgílio Macedo (PSD); Jorge Machado (CDU); Mário Magalhães (PSD); Alberto Martins (PS); Catarina Martins (BE); Cecília Meireles (CDS-PP); Luís Menezes (PSD); Adriano Rafael Moreira (PSD); Andreia Neto (PSD); Honório Novo (CDU); Paulo Rios de Oliveira (PSD); Isabel Oneto (PS); Manuel Pizarro (PS); Cristóvão Simão Ribeiro (PSD); Conceição Bessa Ruão (PSD); Luísa Salgueiro (PS); Renato Sampaio (PS); Emília Santos (PSD); Isabel Santos (PS); Miguel Santos (PSD); Manuel Seabra (PS); João Semedo (BE); Michael Seufert (CDS-PP); Augusto Santos Silva (PS); Luís Vales (PSD); and Ana Paula Vitorino (PS).

==== 2000s ====
===== 2009 =====
Results of the 2009 legislative election held on 27 September 2009:

| Party | | Votes | % | Seats |
|---|---|---|---|---|
| Socialist Party | PS | 422,558 | 42.94% | 18 |
| Social Democratic Party | PSD | 294,398 | 29.91% | 12 |
| CDS – People's Party | CDS–PP | 93,856 | 9.54% | 4 |
| Left Bloc | BE | 92,962 | 9.45% | 3 |
| Unitary Democratic Coalition | CDU | 57,597 | 5.85% | 2 |
| Portuguese Workers' Communist Party | PCTP | 6,991 | 0.71% | 0 |
| Hope for Portugal Movement | MEP | 3,557 | 0.36% | 0 |
| Merit and Society Movement | MMS | 2,224 | 0.23% | 0 |
| Pro-Life Party | PPV | 2,152 | 0.22% | 0 |
| New Democracy Party | ND | 1,795 | 0.18% | 0 |
| The Earth Party Movement and Humanist Party | MPT-PH | 1,758 | 0.18% | 0 |
| People's Monarchist Party | PPM | 1,593 | 0.16% | 0 |
| National Renewal Party | PNR | 1,371 | 0.14% | 0 |
| Workers' Party of Socialist Unity | POUS | 1,353 | 0.14% | 0 |
| Valid votes | | 984,165 | 100.00% | 39 |
| Blank votes | | 15,181 | 1.50% | |
| Rejected votes – other | | 10,678 | 1.06% | |
| Total polled | | 1,010,024 | 64.92% | |
| Registered electors | | 1,555,819 | | |

The following candidates were elected: José Pedro Aguiar-Branco (PSD); João Pinho de Almeida (CDS-PP); Margarida Almeida (PSD); Glória Araújo (PS); Carla Barros (PSD); Agostinho Branquinho (PSD); Maria do Rosário Carneiro (PS); José Ribeiro e Castro (CDS-PP); Raquel Coelho (PSD); Jorge Costa (PSD); Pedro Duarte (PSD); Miguel Frasquilho (PSD); Maria José Gamboa (PS); Fernando Jesus (PS); Marques Júnior (PS); José Lello (PS); Jorge Machado (CDU); José Magalhães (PS); Alberto Martins (PS); Catarina Martins (BE); Cecília Meireles (CDS-PP); Luís Menezes (PSD); Adriano Rafael Moreira (PSD); Honório Novo (CDU); Isabel Oneto (PS); Manuel Pizarro (PS); José Ribeiro (PS); Luísa Roseira (PSD); Luísa Salgueiro (PS); Renato Sampaio (PS); Teixeira dos Santos (PS); Manuel Seabra (PS); João Semedo (BE); Michael Seufert (CDS-PP); Augusto Santos Silva (PS); José Soeiro (BE); Jorge Strecht (PS); Sérgio Vieira (PSD); and Ana Paula Vitorino (PS).

===== 2005 =====
Results of the 2005 legislative election held on 20 February 2005:

| Party | | Votes | % | Seats |
|---|---|---|---|---|
| Socialist Party | PS | 485,975 | 49.91% | 20 |
| Social Democratic Party | PSD | 278,381 | 28.59% | 12 |
| CDS – People's Party | CDS–PP | 68,824 | 7.07% | 2 |
| Left Bloc | BE | 66,912 | 6.87% | 2 |
| Unitary Democratic Coalition | CDU | 54,282 | 5.57% | 2 |
| Portuguese Workers' Communist Party | PCTP | 8,241 | 0.85% | 0 |
| New Democracy Party | ND | 7,675 | 0.79% | 0 |
| Humanist Party | PH | 2,436 | 0.25% | 0 |
| Workers' Party of Socialist Unity | POUS | 1,034 | 0.11% | 0 |
| Valid votes | | 973,760 | 100.00% | 38 |
| Blank votes | | 17,270 | 1.72% | |
| Rejected votes – other | | 11,097 | 1.11% | |
| Total polled | | 1,002,127 | 69.08% | |
| Registered electors | | 1,450,663 | | |

The following candidates were elected: José Pedro Aguiar-Branco (PSD); José Freire Antunes (PSD); Agostinho Branquinho (PSD); Álvaro Castello-Branco (CDS-PP); Jorge Costa (PSD); Marco António Costa (PSD); Joaquim Couto (PS); Luís Braga da Cruz (PS); Paula Cristina Duarte (PS); Pedro Duarte (PSD); Maria José Gamboa (PS); Fernando Gomes (PS); Marques Júnior (PS); Carlos Lage (PS); José Lello (PS); António Pires de Lima (CDS-PP); Isabel Pires de Lima (PS); João Teixeira Lopes (BE); Alda Macedo (BE); António Montalvão Machado (PSD); Jorge Machado (CDU); José Magalhães (PS); Alberto Martins (PS); Guilherme d'Oliveira Martins (PS); Manuela de Melo (PS); Jorge Neto (PSD); Honório Novo (CDU); Manuel Pizarro (PS); Miguel Queiroz (PSD); Paulo Rangel (PSD); Luísa Salgueiro (PS); Renato Sampaio (PS); Isabel Santos (PS); José Raúl dos Santos (PSD); José Saraiva (PS); Augusto Santos Silva (PS); Jorge Strecht (PS); and Sérgio Vieira (PSD).

===== 2002 =====
Results of the 2002 legislative election held on 17 March 2002:

| Party | | Votes | % | Seats |
|---|---|---|---|---|
| Socialist Party | PS | 386,004 | 41.95% | 17 |
| Social Democratic Party | PSD | 375,204 | 40.78% | 16 |
| CDS – People's Party | CDS–PP | 79,034 | 8.59% | 3 |
| Unitary Democratic Coalition | CDU | 43,272 | 4.70% | 1 |
| Left Bloc | BE | 25,195 | 2.74% | 1 |
| Portuguese Workers' Communist Party | PCTP | 5,740 | 0.62% | 0 |
| The Earth Party Movement | MPT | 2,066 | 0.22% | 0 |
| Humanist Party | PH | 1,830 | 0.20% | 0 |
| National Renewal Party | PNR | 1,781 | 0.19% | 0 |
| Valid votes | | 920,126 | 100.00% | 38 |
| Blank votes | | 9,243 | 0.99% | |
| Rejected votes – other | | 8,701 | 0.93% | |
| Total polled | | 938,070 | 65.49% | |
| Registered electors | | 1,432,394 | | |

The following candidates were elected: Rosário Águas (PSD); Ricardo Fonseca de Almeida (PSD); Francisco Assis (PS); Pinho Cardão (PSD); Manuel Maria Carrilho (PS); Álvaro Castello-Branco (CDS-PP); Nelson Correia (PS); Abílio Almeida Costa (PSD); Alberto Costa (PS); Marco António Costa (PSD); Paula Cristina Duarte (PS); Pedro Duarte (PSD); Diogo Feio (CDS-PP); Fernando Gomes (PS); Teresa Patrício de Gouveia (PSD); Basílio Horta (CDS-PP); Teresa Lago (PS); José Lello (PS); Isabel Pires de Lima (PS); João Teixeira Lopes (BE); Diogo Luz (PSD); António Montalvão Machado (PSD); José Magalhães (PS); Alberto Martins (PS); Guilherme d'Oliveira Martins (PS); Manuela de Melo (PS); Manuel Moreira (PSD); Jorge Neto (PSD); Honório Novo (CDU); José Pacheco Pereira (PSD); João Moura de Sá (PSD); Renato Sampaio (PS); José Saraiva (PS); Augusto Santos Silva (PS); Jorge Strecht (PS); Diogo Vasconcelos (PSD); Aurora Vieira (PSD); and Sérgio Vieira (PSD).

==== 1990s ====
===== 1999 =====
Results of the 1999 legislative election held on 10 October 1999:

| Party | | Votes | % | Seats |
|---|---|---|---|---|
| Socialist Party | PS | 439,176 | 48.82% | 19 |
| Social Democratic Party | PSD | 298,910 | 33.23% | 13 |
| CDS – People's Party | CDS–PP | 68,951 | 7.67% | 3 |
| Unitary Democratic Coalition | CDU | 57,138 | 6.35% | 2 |
| Left Bloc | BE | 21,374 | 2.38% | 0 |
| Portuguese Workers' Communist Party | PCTP | 4,588 | 0.51% | 0 |
| People's Monarchist Party | PPM | 2,699 | 0.30% | 0 |
| The Earth Party Movement | MPT | 2,070 | 0.23% | 0 |
| Humanist Party | PH | 2,004 | 0.22% | 0 |
| National Solidarity Party | PSN | 1,974 | 0.22% | 0 |
| Workers' Party of Socialist Unity | POUS | 644 | 0.07% | 0 |
| Valid votes | | 899,528 | 100.00% | 37 |
| Blank votes | | 8,898 | 0.97% | |
| Rejected votes – other | | 6,815 | 0.74% | |
| Total polled | | 915,241 | 64.64% | |
| Registered electors | | 1,415,952 | | |

The following candidates were elected: João Amaral (CDU); Francisco Assis (PS); Natália Carrascalão (PSD); Manuel Maria Carrilho (PS); Vieira de Carvalho (PSD); Sílvio Rui Cervan (CDS-PP); Miguel Anacoreta Correia (CDS-PP); Paula Cristina Duarte (PS); Pedro Duarte (PSD); Elisa Ferreira (PS); Fernando Gomes (PS); Agostinho Gonçalves (PS); Teresa Patrício de Gouveia (PSD); José Lamego (PS); José Lello (PS); José Lemos (PS); Isabel Pires de Lima (PS); João Eduardo Pinto de Loureiro (PSD); António Montalvão Machado (PSD); Alberto Martins (PS); Guilherme d'Oliveira Martins (PS); José Narciso de Miranda (PS); José Barros Moura (PS); Jorge Neto (PSD); Honório Novo (CDU); José Luís da Silva Oliveira (PSD); Manuel Queiró (CDS-PP); Rui Rio (PSD); Maria de Belém Roseira (PS); João Moura de Sá (PSD); Manuel António dos Santos (PS); José Saraiva (PS); Emília dos Anjos Pereira da Silva (PSD); Eduardo Azevedo Soares (PSD); Jorge Strecht (PS); Luísa Vasconcelos (PS); and José Macedo Vieira (PSD).

===== 1995 =====
Results of the 1995 legislative election held on 1 October 1995:

| Party | | Votes | % | Seats |
|---|---|---|---|---|
| Socialist Party | PS | 467,512 | 47.44% | 18 |
| Social Democratic Party | PSD | 364,019 | 36.94% | 14 |
| CDS – People's Party | CDS–PP | 77,602 | 7.87% | 3 |
| Unitary Democratic Coalition | CDU | 60,178 | 6.11% | 2 |
| Revolutionary Socialist Party | PSR | 3,523 | 0.36% | 0 |
| Portuguese Workers' Communist Party | PCTP | 3,220 | 0.33% | 0 |
| Popular Democratic Union | UDP | 2,883 | 0.29% | 0 |
| National Solidarity Party | PSN | 2,478 | 0.25% | 0 |
| People's Monarchist Party and The Earth Party Movement | PPM-MPT | 2,292 | 0.23% | 0 |
| People's Party | PG | 1,414 | 0.14% | 0 |
| Unity Movement for Workers | MUT | 377 | 0.04% | 0 |
| Valid votes | | 985,498 | 100.00% | 37 |
| Blank votes | | 6,632 | 0.66% | |
| Rejected votes – other | | 9,021 | 0.90% | |
| Total polled | | 1,001,151 | 71.22% | |
| Registered electors | | 1,405,730 | | |

The following candidates were elected: João Amaral (CDU); Francisco Assis (PS); Daniel Bessa (PS); José Calçada (CDU); Manuel Cavaleiro Brandão (CDS-PP); Carlos de Brito (PSD); Maria Carrilho (PS); Silva Carvalho (CDS-PP); Vieira de Carvalho (PSD); Pedro da Vinha Costa (PSD); Joaquim Couto (PS); Carlos Duarte (PSD); Júlio Faria (PS); Domingos Gomes (PSD); Fernando Gomes (PS); Luís Marques Guedes (PSD); José Lello (PS); Alberto Martins (PS); Guilherme d'Oliveira Martins (PS); Luís Pedro Martins (PS); Paulo Mendo (PSD); Luís Filipe Menezes (PSD); José Narciso de Miranda (PS); Manuel Moreira (PSD); Rosa Mota (PS); Joaquim Pina Moura (PS); Fernando Nogueira (PSD); Isabel Pedroto (PS); Sérgio Sousa Pinto (PS); Rui Rio (PSD); Manuel António dos Santos (PS); José Saraiva (PS); Jorge Strecht (PS); António Taveira (PSD); Bernardino Vasconcelos (PSD); Sérgio Vieira (PSD); and António Lobo Xavier (CDS-PP).

===== 1991 =====
Results of the 1991 legislative election held on 6 October 1991:

| Party | | Votes | % | Seats |
|---|---|---|---|---|
| Social Democratic Party | PSD | 489,247 | 52.17% | 21 |
| Socialist Party | PS | 313,893 | 33.47% | 13 |
| Unitary Democratic Coalition | CDU | 60,666 | 6.47% | 2 |
| Social Democratic Centre Party | CDS | 38,882 | 4.15% | 1 |
| National Solidarity Party | PSN | 10,446 | 1.11% | 0 |
| Revolutionary Socialist Party | PSR | 6,724 | 0.72% | 0 |
| Portuguese Workers' Communist Party | PCTP | 6,268 | 0.67% | 0 |
| Democratic Renewal Party | PRD | 4,437 | 0.47% | 0 |
| People's Monarchist Party | PPM | 3,433 | 0.37% | 0 |
| Left Revolutionary Front | FER | 1,906 | 0.20% | 0 |
| Democratic Party of the Atlantic | PDA | 1,821 | 0.19% | 0 |
| Valid votes | | 937,723 | 100.00% | 37 |
| Blank votes | | 5,980 | 0.63% | |
| Rejected votes – other | | 9,893 | 1.04% | |
| Total polled | | 953,596 | 72.29% | |
| Registered electors | | 1,319,056 | | |

The following candidates were elected: Alberto Araujo (PSD); Raúl Brito (PS); Vieira de Carvalho (PSD); Raúl Castro (CDU); Arlindo Cunha (PSD); Falcão e Cunha (PSD); Nuno Delerue (PSD); Alípio Dias (PSD); Carlos Duarte (PSD); Menezes Ferreira (PS); Luís Geraldes (PSD); Carlos Lage (PS); José Lamego (PS); José Lello (PS); Braga de Macedo (PSD); Guilherme d'Oliveira Martins (PS); José Meireles (PSD); Luís Filipe Menezes (PSD); Joaquim Cavaqueiro Mestre (PS); José Narciso de Miranda (PS); Manuel Moreira (PSD); Fernando Nogueira (PSD); Carlos Oliveira (PSD); José Pacheco Pereira (PSD); Gustavo Pimenta (PS); João de Deus Pinheiro (PSD); Adriano Pinto (PSD); Antero Pinto (PSD); Manuel Queiró (CDS); Rui Rio (PSD); Guido Rodrigues (PSD); Luís Sá (CDU); Maria Julieta Sampaio (PS); António de Almeida Santos (PS); Manuel António dos Santos (PS); António José Seguro (PS); and Aristides Teixeira (PSD).

==== 1980s ====
===== 1987 =====
Results of the 1987 legislative election held on 19 July 1987:

| Party | | Votes | % | Seats |
|---|---|---|---|---|
| Social Democratic Party | PSD | 475,410 | 51.83% | 22 |
| Socialist Party | PS | 249,443 | 27.19% | 11 |
| Unitary Democratic Coalition | CDU | 87,335 | 9.52% | 4 |
| Democratic Renewal Party | PRD | 37,581 | 4.10% | 1 |
| Social Democratic Centre Party | CDS | 36,997 | 4.03% | 1 |
| Popular Democratic Union | UDP | 6,169 | 0.67% | 0 |
| Revolutionary Socialist Party | PSR | 5,997 | 0.65% | 0 |
| Portuguese Democratic Movement | MDP | 4,166 | 0.45% | 0 |
| Communist Party (Reconstructed) | PC(R) | 4,112 | 0.45% | 0 |
| Workers' Party of Socialist Unity | POUS | 2,800 | 0.31% | 0 |
| Christian Democratic Party | PDC | 2,634 | 0.29% | 0 |
| Portuguese Workers' Communist Party | PCTP | 2,334 | 0.25% | 0 |
| People's Monarchist Party | PPM | 2,303 | 0.25% | 0 |
| Valid votes | | 917,281 | 100.00% | 39 |
| Blank votes | | 5,834 | 0.63% | |
| Rejected votes – other | | 10,187 | 1.09% | |
| Total polled | | 933,302 | 78.01% | |
| Registered electors | | 1,196,453 | | |

The following candidates were elected: Maria Manuela Aguiar (PSD); Rui Amaral (PSD); Alberto Araujo (PSD); Joaquim Vilela Araújo (PSD); António Bacelar (PSD); Leonor Beleza (PSD); Mário Cal Brandão (PS); Raúl Brito (PS); Raúl Castro (CDU); Jorge Catarino (PS); Edgar Correia (CDU); Rosado Correia (PS); Carlos Costa (CDU); Arlindo Cunha (PSD); Nuno Delerue (PSD); Alípio Dias (PSD); Basílio Horta (CDS); José da Silva Lopes (PRD); António Macedo (PS); Mário Montalvão Machado (PSD); Alberto Martins (PS); Manuel Martins (PSD); José Meireles (PSD); Luís Filipe Menezes (PSD); José Narciso de Miranda (PS); Arlindo Moreira (PSD); Manuel Moreira (PSD); António da Silva Mota (CDU); José Luís Nunes (PS); Carlos Oliveira (PSD); João de Deus Pinheiro (PSD); Lacerda de Queiroz (PSD); Guido Rodrigues (PSD); Helena Roseta (PS); António de Almeida Santos (PS); Coelho dos Santos (PSD); Manuel António dos Santos (PS); Domingos da Silva e Sousa (PSD); and António Tavares (PSD).

===== 1985 =====
Results of the 1985 legislative election held on 6 October 1985:

| Party | | Votes | % | Seats |
|---|---|---|---|---|
| Social Democratic Party | PSD | 270,526 | 29.99% | 12 |
| Socialist Party | PS | 217,356 | 24.09% | 10 |
| Democratic Renewal Party | PRD | 188,751 | 20.92% | 8 |
| United People Alliance | APU | 111,272 | 12.33% | 5 |
| Social Democratic Centre Party | CDS | 89,976 | 9.97% | 4 |
| Popular Democratic Union | UDP | 9,846 | 1.09% | 0 |
| Christian Democratic Party | PDC | 4,556 | 0.51% | 0 |
| Revolutionary Socialist Party | PSR | 4,440 | 0.49% | 0 |
| Workers' Party of Socialist Unity | POUS | 2,077 | 0.23% | 0 |
| Portuguese Workers' Communist Party | PCTP | 1,910 | 0.21% | 0 |
| Communist Party (Reconstructed) | PC(R) | 1,415 | 0.16% | 0 |
| Valid votes | | 902,125 | 100.00% | 39 |
| Blank votes | | 6,368 | 0.69% | |
| Rejected votes – other | | 14,166 | 1.54% | |
| Total polled | | 922,669 | 78.76% | |
| Registered electors | | 1,171,490 | | |

The following candidates were elected: Rui Amaral (PSD); Amélia Azevedo (PSD); Leonor Beleza (PSD); Manuel Cavaleiro Brandão (CDS); Mário Cal Brandão (PS); Bártolo Campos (PRD); José Maria Vieira Dias de Carvalho (PRD); Maria da Glória Carvalho (PRD); Vieira de Carvalho (CDS); Raúl Castro (APU); Rosado Correia (PS); Barbosa da Costa (PRD); Carlos Costa (APU); Alípio Dias (PSD); Ilda Figueiredo (APU); Fernando Gomes (PS); Carlos Lage (PS); José da Silva Lopes (PRD); António Macedo (PS); Mário Montalvão Machado (PSD); José Narciso de Miranda (PS); Adriano Moreira (CDS); Manuel Moreira (PSD); António da Silva Mota (APU); José Luís Nunes (PS); Valente de Oliveira (PSD); José Albino Silva Peneda (PSD); António Eduardo Andrade de Sousa Pereira (PRD); Carlos Pereira Pinto (PS); Lacerda de Queiroz (PSD); Jaime Silva Ramos (PRD); José Rodrigo (PRD); Guido Rodrigues (PSD); António de Almeida Santos (PS); Joaquim Santos (CDS); José Augusto Seabra (PSD); António Tavares (PSD); Gonçalo Ribeiro Telles (PS); and Ângelo Veloso (APU).

===== 1983 =====
Results of the 1983 legislative election held on 25 April 1983:

| Party | | Votes | % | Seats |
|---|---|---|---|---|
| Socialist Party | PS | 383,485 | 43.86% | 18 |
| Social Democratic Party | PSD | 233,615 | 26.72% | 10 |
| United People Alliance | APU | 121,181 | 13.86% | 5 |
| Social Democratic Centre Party | CDS | 111,007 | 12.70% | 5 |
| Popular Democratic Union and Revolutionary Socialist Party | UDP-PSR | 7,338 | 0.84% | 0 |
| Christian Democratic Party | PDC | 5,164 | 0.59% | 0 |
| People's Monarchist Party | PPM | 4,138 | 0.47% | 0 |
| Workers' Party of Socialist Unity | POUS | 3,759 | 0.43% | 0 |
| Portuguese Workers' Communist Party | PCTP | 2,370 | 0.27% | 0 |
| Socialist Workers League | LST | 1,383 | 0.16% | 0 |
| Portuguese Marxist– Leninist Communist Organization | OCMLP | 965 | 0.11% | 0 |
| Valid votes | | 874,405 | 100.00% | 38 |
| Blank votes | | 5,125 | 0.58% | |
| Rejected votes – other | | 11,366 | 1.28% | |
| Total polled | | 890,896 | 81.98% | |
| Registered electors | | 1,086,668 | | |

The following candidates were elected: Rui Amaral (PSD); Amélia Azevedo (PSD); Bento Azevedo (PS); Beatriz Cal Brandão (PS); Mário Cal Brandão (PS); Agostinho Branquinho (PSD); Raúl Brito (PS); Vieira de Carvalho (CDS); Vilhena de Carvalho (PS); Raúl Castro (APU); Eugénio Anacoreta Correia (CDS); Rosado Correia (PS); Carlos Costa (APU); Alípio Dias (PSD); Eurico Figueiredo (PS); Fernando Gomes (PS); Bento Gonçalves (PSD); Carlos Lage (PS); José Lello (PS); Lino Carvalho de Lima (APU); António Macedo (PS); Mário Montalvão Machado (PSD); Manuel Martins (PSD); José Narciso de Miranda (PS); Francisco Monteiro (PS); Adriano Moreira (CDS); Manuel Moreira (PSD); António da Silva Mota (APU); José Luís Nunes (PS); João Porto (CDS); António de Almeida Santos (PS); Joaquim Santos (CDS); Manuel Araújo dos Santos (PSD); José Augusto Seabra (PSD); Fernando de Sousa (PS); Laranjeira Vaz (PS); Ângelo Veloso (APU); and António Vitorino (PS).

===== 1980 =====
Results of the 1980 legislative election held on 5 October 1980:

| Party | | Votes | % | Seats |
|---|---|---|---|---|
| Democratic Alliance | AD | 429,685 | 47.45% | 19 |
| Republican and Socialist Front | FRS | 316,032 | 34.90% | 14 |
| United People Alliance | APU | 110,013 | 12.15% | 5 |
| Workers' Party of Socialist Unity | POUS | 15,526 | 1.71% | 0 |
| Popular Democratic Union | UDP | 12,592 | 1.39% | 0 |
| Revolutionary Socialist Party | PSR | 9,966 | 1.10% | 0 |
| Labour Party | PT | 5,618 | 0.62% | 0 |
| Portuguese Workers' Communist Party | PCTP | 3,453 | 0.38% | 0 |
| Christian Democratic Party, Independent Movement for the National Reconstruction / Party of the Portuguese Right and National Front | PDC- MIRN/ PDP- FN | 1,557 | 0.17% | 0 |
| Democratic Party of the Atlantic | PDA | 1,158 | 0.13% | 0 |
| Valid votes | | 905,600 | 100.00% | 38 |
| Blank votes | | 3,774 | 0.41% | |
| Rejected votes – other | | 12,717 | 1.38% | |
| Total polled | | 922,091 | 82.61% | |
| Registered electors | | 1,116,231 | | |

The following candidates were elected: Rui Amaral (AD); Amélia Azevedo (AD); Bento Azevedo (FRS); Francisco Pinto Balsemão (AD); Mário Cal Brandão (FRS); Joaquim Gomes Carneiro (FRS); Adelino Carvalho (FRS); Raúl Castro (APU); Eugénio Anacoreta Correia (AD); Adelino Amaro da Costa (AD); Carlos Costa (APU); Luís de Azevedo Coutinho (AD); Alípio Dias (AD); Américo Dias (AD); António Fernandes Fonseca (FRS); Fernando Gomes (FRS); Bento Gonçalves (AD); Carlos Lage (FRS); António Teixeira Lopes (FRS); António Macedo (FRS); Mário Montalvão Machado (AD); Manuel Martins (AD); António Cardoso Moniz (AD); António da Silva Mota (APU); Manuel Moreira (AD); Adalberto Neiva (AD); José Luís Nunes (FRS); João Porto (AD); Lacerda de Queiroz (AD); António Vilar Ribeiro (AD); Adriano Rodrigues (AD); Luís Saias (FRS); Rui Sampaio (FRS); António de Almeida Santos (FRS); Manuel António dos Santos (FRS); Manuel Araújo dos Santos (AD); Armando Teixeira Silva (APU); and Ângelo Veloso (APU).

==== 1970s ====
===== 1979 =====
Results of the 1979 legislative election held on 2 December 1979:

| Party | | Votes | % | Seats |
|---|---|---|---|---|
| Democratic Alliance | AD | 405,060 | 45.31% | 18 |
| Socialist Party | PS | 317,078 | 35.47% | 14 |
| United People Alliance | APU | 131,833 | 14.75% | 6 |
| Popular Democratic Union | UDP | 17,297 | 1.93% | 0 |
| Christian Democratic Party | PDC | 9,519 | 1.06% | 0 |
| Left-wing Union for the Socialist Democracy | UEDS | 4,686 | 0.52% | 0 |
| Portuguese Workers' Communist Party | PCTP | 4,640 | 0.52% | 0 |
| Revolutionary Socialist Party | PSR | 3,943 | 0.44% | 0 |
| Valid votes | | 894,056 | 100.00% | 38 |
| Blank votes | | 4,889 | 0.54% | |
| Rejected votes – other | | 12,393 | 1.36% | |
| Total polled | | 911,338 | 66.79% | |
| Registered electors | | 1,364,425 | | |

The following candidates were elected: Rui Amaral (AD); Amélia Azevedo (AD); Bento Azevedo (PS); Armando Bacelar (PS); Francisco Pinto Balsemão (AD); Maria Barroso (PS); Beatriz Cal Brandão (PS); António Carneiro (AD); Joaquim Gomes Carneiro (PS); Adelino Carvalho (PS); Raúl Castro (APU); Eugénio Anacoreta Correia (AD); Adelino Amaro da Costa (AD); Carlos Costa (APU); Luís de Azevedo Coutinho (AD); Américo Dias (AD); Gomes Fernandes (PS); Ilda Figueiredo (APU); António Fernandes Fonseca (PS); Bento Gonçalves (AD); Carlos Lage (PS); Lino Carvalho Lima (APU); António Macedo (PS); Mário Montalvão Machado (AD); Pelágio Madureira (AD); António da Silva Mota (APU); Adalberto Neiva (AD); José Luís Nunes (PS); Lacerda de Queiroz (AD); Manuel Lopes Ribeiro (AD); Adriano Rodrigues (AD); Américo Sá (AD); Manuel António dos Santos (PS); Manuel Araújo dos Santos (AD); António Moreira da Silva (AD); Maria Moreira da Silva (PS); Ângelo Veloso (APU); and Emilio Vilar (PS).

===== 1976 =====
Results of the 1976 legislative election held on 25 April 1976:

| Party | | Votes | % | Seats |
|---|---|---|---|---|
| Socialist Party | PS | 336,960 | 42.56% | 18 |
| Democratic People's Party | PPD | 222,974 | 28.17% | 11 |
| Social Democratic Centre Party | CDS | 129,732 | 16.39% | 6 |
| Portuguese Communist Party | PCP | 69,176 | 8.74% | 3 |
| Popular Democratic Union | UDP | 12,590 | 1.59% | 0 |
| People's Socialist Front | FSP | 3,817 | 0.48% | 0 |
| People's Monarchist Party | PPM | 3,047 | 0.38% | 0 |
| Christian Democratic Party | PDC | 3,014 | 0.38% | 0 |
| Internationalist Communist League | LCI | 2,376 | 0.30% | 0 |
| Movement of Socialist Left | MES | 2,256 | 0.28% | 0 |
| Re-Organized Movement of the Party of the Proletariat | MRPP | 1,963 | 0.25% | 0 |
| Workers' Revolutionary Party | PRT | 1,442 | 0.18% | 0 |
| Worker–Peasant Alliance | AOC | 1,167 | 0.15% | 0 |
| Communist Party of Portugal (Marxist–Leninist) | PCP(ML) | 1,154 | 0.15% | 0 |
| Valid votes | | 791,668 | 100.00% | 38 |
| Rejected votes | | 35,526 | 4.29% | |
| Total polled | | 827,194 | 88.30% | |
| Registered electors | | 936,819 | | |

The following candidates were elected: Fernando Jaime Almeida (PS); Alberto Augusto Andrade (PS); Albino Aroso (PPD); Amélia Azevedo (PPD); Bento Azevedo (PS); Beatriz Cal Brandão (PS); Alcino Cardoso (CDS); Francisco Sá Carneiro (PPD); Joaquim Gomes Carneiro (PS); Adelino Carvalho (PS); Adelino Amaro da Costa (CDS); Barbosa da Costa (PPD); Carlos Costa (PCP); Luís de Azevedo Coutinho (CDS); Walter Cudell (CDS); Gomes Fernandes (PS); Manuel Lencastre Meneses de Sousa Figueiredo (PS); António Fernandes Fonseca (PS); Olivio França (PPD); Bento Gonçalves (PPD); Carlos Lage (PS); Lino Carvalho Lima (PCP); Arcanjo Luís (PPD); António Macedo (PS); Mário Montalvão Machado (PPD); Manuel Joaquim Moreira Moutinho (PPD); José Luís Nunes (PS); Rui Garcia de Oliveira (CDS); José Cândido Pimenta (PS); Francisco Lucas Pires (CDS); Manuel Joaquim Pires (PS); Lacerda de Queiroz (PPD); Maria Moreira da Silva (PS); Agostinho Vale (PS); Ângelo Veloso (PCP); Eduardo José Vieira (PPD); Emilio Vilar (PS); and Salgado Zenha (PS).
