= Cristina Rodrigues (politician) =

Portuguese politician (born 1985)

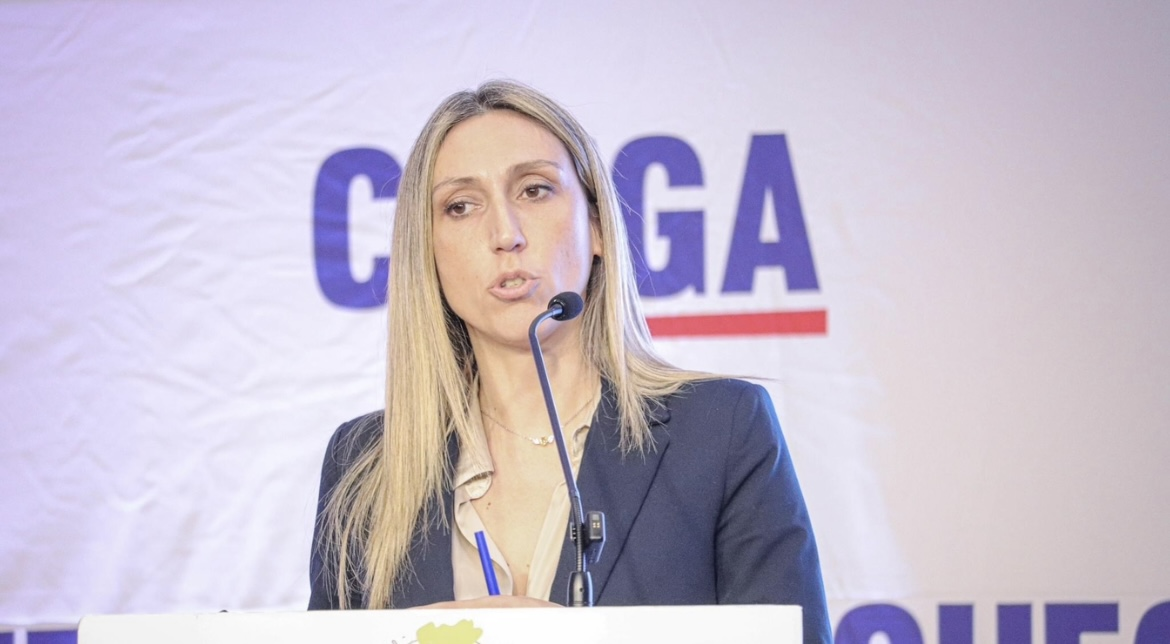
- Cristina Rodrigues in 2024

Vice President of the National Jurisdiction Council of Chega
- Incumbent
- Assumed office 14 January 2024
- President: Bernardo Pessanha

Member of the Assembly of the Republic
- Incumbent
- Assumed office 26 March 2024
- Constituency: Porto
- In office 25 October 2019 – 28 March 2022
- Constituency: Setúbal

Personal details
- Born: Maria Cristina Pacheco Rodrigues; 14 June 1985 (age 41) Lisbon, Portugal
- Party: Chega (2023–present)
- Other political affiliations: PAN (2014–2020); Independent (2020–2023)
- Education: University of Lisbon
- Occupation: Jurist • Politician

Maria Cristina Pacheco Rodrigues (born 14 June 1985) is a Portuguese politician and lawyer. She was a member of the Assembly of the Republic for Setúbal between 2019 and 2022, representing People Animals Nature (PAN). She was re-elected in 2024 as a member of Chega for the Porto constituency.

== Biography ==
Rodrigues has worked in victim support and as a pro bono lawyer for domestic violence victims and for members of Intervenção e Resgate Animal, an animal rights and rescue organisation. In July 2019, she was chosen as list leader for People Animals Nature in Setúbal District, ahead of the elections in October. She and three other women from PAN were elected, joining party leader André Silva in the Assembly of the Republic.

On 25 June 2020, Rodrigues quit PAN, due to objections to Silva's alleged authoritarianism, and sat as an independent. She became only the second independent at the time, along with Joacine Katar Moreira, whose membership of Livre had been rescinded. Her resignation came days after that of PAN's only Member of the European Parliament, Francisco Guerreiro. Later that year, she abstained, so that the state budget would pass, saying: "I will let it happen, but I won't vote in favour of it".

On 23 March 2022, Rodrigues was announced as a new member of the legal department of the right-wing populist party Chega. In 2023 she joined the party.

In January 2024, she was announced as candidate number three, on Chega's Porto list for the 2024 legislative elections, behind Rui Afonso and Diogo Pacheco de Amorim. She was elected.
