= Manuel Loff =

Portuguese politician (born 1965)

Member of the Assembly of the Republic
- In office 7 March 2023 – 15 September 2023
- Preceded by: Diana Ferreira
- Succeeded by: Alfredo Maia
- Constituency: Porto

Personal details
- Born: Manuel Vicente de Sousa Lima Loff; 3 February 1965 (age 61) Porto, Portugal
- Party: Independent
- Other political affiliations: Unitary Democratic Coalition
- Education: European University Institute
- Occupation: Academic

Manuel Vicente de Sousa Lima Loff (born 3 February 1965) is a Portuguese historian, politician and former member of the Assembly of the Republic, the national legislature of Portugal. An independent affiliated with the Portuguese Communist Party, he represented Porto from March 2023 to September 2023.

== Early life ==
Loff was born on 3 February 1965 in Porto. He has a degree in history (1984) and post-graduate qualification in history education (1991) from the University of Porto (1988). He received a master's degree in 19th and 20th century history from the NOVA University Lisbon in 1994 after producing a thesis titled Franquismo y Salazarismo en la Época de Hitler. Régimen político, prejuicio ideológico y oportunidad histórica en la redefinición internacional de Portugal y España (1936-1942) for the National University of Distance Education. He received a doctorate in history and civilization from the European University Institute in 2004 after producing a thesis titled As duas ditaduras ibéricas na Nova Ordem eurofascista (1936-1945). Autodefinição, mundivisão e Holocausto no Salazarismo e Franquismo.

Loff was a student activist and fought against the policies of the Prime Minister Aníbal Cavaco Silva's government in the 1980s.

== Career ==
Loff is an history academic by profession. He was a teaching assistant at the Autonomous University of Madrid (1996–1997), and an assistant lecturer (1997–2004) and assistant professor (2004–2010) at the University of Porto. He was a visiting professor at the Hebrew University of Jerusalem in 2013. He was a tenured associate professor at the University of Porto from 2010 to 2023. He is also a researcher at the Instituto de História Contemporânea (NOVA University Lisbon) and Centre d’Estudis sobre Dictadures i Democràcias (Autonomous University of Barcelona).

Loff was a columnist for Público (2011 to 2023) and a commentator on CNN Portugal (2022 to 2023) and Rádio e Televisão de Portugal. At the 2022 legislative election Loff was placed third in the Unitary Democratic Coalition (CDU)'s list of candidates in Porto but the alliance only won a single seat in the constituency. He was an independent proposed by the Portuguese Communist Party. Loff was appointed to the Assembly of the Republic as permanent member in March 2023 following the resignation of Diana Ferreira. He resigned from the Assembly in September 2023 in order to return to academia and was replaced by Alfredo Maia.

== Works ==
Loff has produced a number works on fascism, colonialism, resistance and the Carnation Revolution including:

- Salazarismo e Franquismo na Época de Hitler (1936-1942) - Convergência política, preconceito ideológico e oportunidade histórica na redefinição internacional de Portugal e Espanha [Salazarism and Francoism in the Hitler Era (1936-1942) - Political convergence, ideological prejudice and historical opportunity in the international redefinition of Portugal and Spain] (in Portuguese). Porto, Portugal: Campo das Letras. 1996. ISBN 978-972-610-000-3.
- ——; Delgado, Iva; et al., eds. (2000). De Pinochet a Timor Lorosae - Impunidade e Direito à Memória [From Pinochet to East Timor - Impunity and the Right to Memory] (in Portuguese). Lisbon, Portugal: Fundação Humberto Delgado/Edições Cosmos. ISBN 978-972-762-192-7.
- ——; Delgado, Iva; et al., eds. (2000). Impunidad y Derecho a la Memoria - De Pinochet a Timor [Impunity and Right to Memory - From Pinochet to Timor] (in Spanish). Madrid, Spain: Sequitur. ISBN 978-849-536-307-7.
- —— & Pereira, Maria da Conceição, eds. (2006). Portugal, 30 anos de Democracia (1974-2004) [Portugal, 30 years of Democracy (1974-2004)] (in Portuguese). Porto, Portugal: University of Porto.
- O nosso século é fascista! - O mundo visto por Salazar e Franco (1936-1945) [Our century is fascist! - The world seen by Salazar and Franco (1936-1945)] (in Portuguese). Porto, Portugal: Campo das Letras. 2008. ISBN 978-989-625-256-4.
- —— & Siza, Teresa, eds. (2010). Resistência - Da alternativa republicana à luta contra a ditadura (1891-1974) [Resistance - From the republican alternative to the fight against dictatorship (1891-1974)] (in Portuguese). Lisbon, Portugal: Comissão Nacional para a Comemoração do Centenário da República. ISBN 978-972-27-1836-3.
- ——; Rollo, Maria Fernanda; et al., eds. (2013). Dicionário de história da I República e do republicanismo - Volume 1: A-E [Dictionary of the history of the First Republic and republicanism - Volume 1: A-E] (in Portuguese). Lisbon, Portugal: Assembly of the Republic. ISBN 978-972-556-557-5.
- ——; Rollo, Maria Fernanda; et al., eds. (2014). Dicionário de história da I República e do republicanismo - Volume 2: F-M [Dictionary of the history of the First Republic and republicanism - Volume 2: F-M] (in Portuguese). Lisbon, Portugal: Assembly of the Republic. ISBN 978-972-556-558-2.
- ——; Rollo, Maria Fernanda; et al., eds. (2014). Dicionário de história da I República e do republicanismo - Volume 3: N-Z [Dictionary of the history of the First Republic and republicanism - Volume 3: N-Z] (in Portuguese). Lisbon, Portugal: Assembly of the Republic. ISBN 978-972-556-559-9.
- ——; Piedade, Filipe & Castro Soutelo, Luciana, eds. (2014). Ditaduras e revolução – Democracia e políticas da memória [Dictatorships and revolution – Democracy and politics of memory] (in Portuguese). Coimbra, Portugal: Livraria Almedina. ISBN 978-972-40-5835-1.
- ——; Vieira, Tiago & Guerra, Filipe (2021). O novo normal [The new normal] (in Portuguese). Lisbon, Portugal: Página a Página. ISBN 978-989-53401-4-9.
