= Alfredo Maia =

Portuguese politician (born 1962)

Member of the Assembly of the Republic
- Incumbent
- Assumed office 15 September 2023
- Preceded by: Manuel Loff
- Constituency: Porto

Member of the Municipal Assembly of Maia
- In office 26 October 2017 – 14 October 2021

Personal details
- Born: Manuel Alfredo da Rocha Maia; 13 March 1962 (age 64)
- Party: Portuguese Communist Party
- Other political affiliations: Unitary Democratic Coalition
- Occupation: Journalist

Manuel Alfredo da Rocha Maia (born 13 March 1962) is a Portuguese journalist, politician and member of the Assembly of the Republic, the national legislature of Portugal. A communist, he has represented Porto since September 2023. He had previously been a temporary substitute member of the Assembly from September 2022 to March 2023.

Maia was born on 13 March 1962. He started his journalistic career at the O Primeiro de Janeiro in January 1981. He was a member of the paper's workers committee and editorial board. He joined the Jornal de Notícias in March 1988 and became coordinator of the paper's society section in 2000. He was a member of the paper's editorial board several times and was an elected union delegate. He also contributed to other media outlets including TVer, O Jornal Ilustrado, Sábado, Rádio Activ, Rádio Nova, Vértice and AbrilAbril.

Maia was vice-president of the Sindicato dos Jornalistas (Journalists' Union) from 1993 to 2000 and president from 2000 to 2015. He is a substitute member of the Comissão de Apelo da Comissão da Carteira Profissional de Jornalista (Appeal Committee of the Journalist Professional Card Commission) and a member of the Comissão de Conciliação da Associação de Jornalistas e Homens de Letras do Porto *Conciliation Committee of the Association of Journalists and Men of Letters of Porto).

Maia was a member of the municipal councils in Maia and Porto. He was a candidate for the Unitary Democratic Coalition (CDU) at the 2015, 2019 and 2022 legislative elections in Porto but on each occasion the alliance failed to win sufficient seats in the constituency for Maia to be elected. However, when Diana Ferreira went on maternity leave in September 2022, Maia was appointed temporarily to the Assembly for six months. He was appointed to the Assembly as a permanent member in September 2023 following Manuel Loff's resignation. He was re-elected at the 2024 legislative election.

Electoral history of Alfredo Maia
Election	Constituency	Party	Alliance	No.	Result
2015 legislative	Porto	Portuguese Communist Party	Unitary Democratic Coalition	6	Not elected
2017 local	Maia Municipal Assembly	Portuguese Communist Party	Unitary Democratic Coalition	1	Elected
2019 legislative	Porto	Portuguese Communist Party	Unitary Democratic Coalition	3	Not elected
2021 local	Maia Municipal Chamber	Portuguese Communist Party	Unitary Democratic Coalition	1	Not elected
2022 legislative	Porto	Portuguese Communist Party	Unitary Democratic Coalition	13	Not elected
2024 legislative	Porto	Portuguese Communist Party	Unitary Democratic Coalition	1	Elected
