= Seufert =

Seufert is a surname. Notable people with the surname include:

- Christina Seufert (born 1957), American diver
- Christopher Seufert (born 1967), American documentary film producer and director
- Michael Seufert (born 1983), Portuguese politician
- Nils Seufert (born 1997), German footballer
