= Ana Gabriela Cabilhas =

Portuguese politician

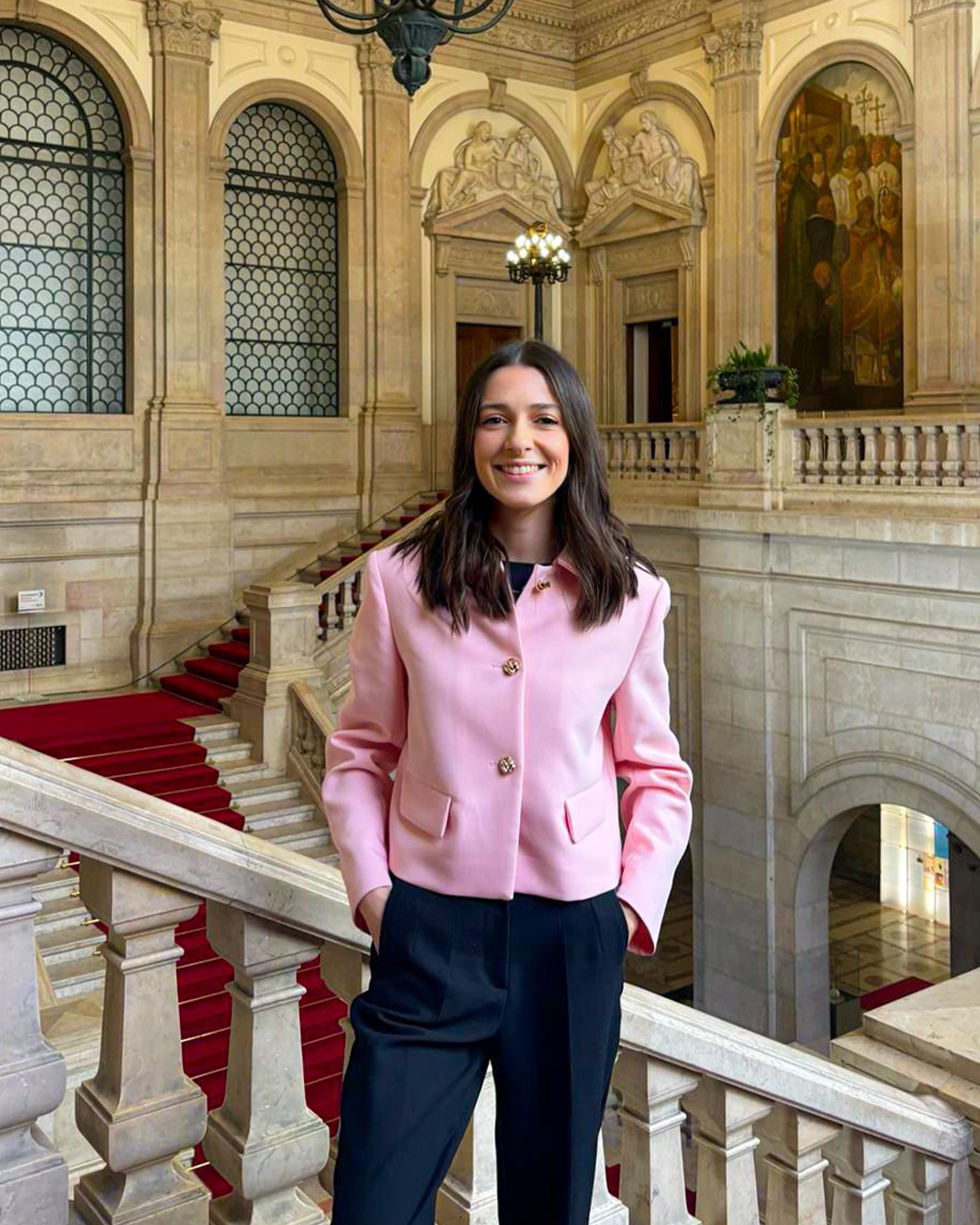
- Ana Gabriela Cabilhas in 2024

Member of the Assembly of the Republic
- Incumbent
- Assumed office 26 March 2024
- Constituency: Porto

Personal details
- Born: Ana Gabriela Oliveira Cabilhas; 11 February 1997 (age 29) Albergaria-a-Velha, Aveiro District, Portugal
- Party: Social Democratic Party
- Education: University of Porto
- Occupation: Nutritionist • Politician

Ana Gabriela Oliveira Cabilhas (born 11 February 1997) is a member of the Assembly of the Republic of Portugal, having been elected in the March 2024 national election and re-elected in the 2025 election. Prior to that she was an active student leader in the University of Porto.

== Education ==
Cabilhas was born on 11 February 1997 in Albergaria-a-Velha, a municipality in the Aveiro District of Portugal. She obtained a degree in nutritional sciences (2019) and a master's degree in consumer sciences and nutrition (2023) from the Faculdade de Ciências da Nutrição e Alimentação da Universidade do Porto (FCNAUP). Her master's thesis was on the topic of "Healthy and sustainable eating behaviours in higher education students". In 2019, she was invited to join the board of the Porto Academic Federation (FAP), which is an umbrella body of 26 student associations in the Porto area, being responsible for the areas of community, inclusion and health. From 2021 she served as the president of FAP, in which role one of her activities was to develop the Academia 24 student residence, operated by FAP. She had previously been active in the FCNAUP student body as a member and president of the executive council and the pedagogical council. She then became a student representative on the general council of the University of Porto, the university's governing body, and is also a member of the general assembly board of the Portuguese Nutrition Association. From 2022 she became a member of the Conselho Nacional de Educação (National Education Council), an advisory body on educational matters.

Cabilhas has been a regular contributor to newspapers and magazines, notably through a weekly column in the Jornal de Notícias and in the Sábado magazine.

== Political career ==
Cabilhas is a member of the Social Democratic Party (PSD). She is the co-ordinator of the committee on "Long-life and health" of the PSD National Strategy Council. For the March 2024 national election the PSD formed a coalition with two smaller parties, known as the Democratic Alliance (AD). Cabilhas was placed 12th on the AD's list of candidates for the Porto constituency, which elects a total of 40 of the 230 members of the parliament. The AD won 14 of the seats and she was duly elected. The AD won the largest number of seats in the national parliament but failed to secure an overall majority. At the end of March 2024, it was nevertheless asked by the president Marcelo Rebelo de Sousa to form a government.
