= Andreia Neto =

Portuguese politician and businessperson (born 1980)

- Constituency: Porto

Member of the Assembly of the Republic
- Incumbent
- Assumed office January 2022
- Constituency: Porto

Member of the Assembly of the Republic
- In office June 2011 – October 2019
- Constituency: Porto

Personal details
- Born: Andreia Carina Machado da Silva Neto; 4 August 1980 (age 46)
- Citizenship: Portugal
- Party: Social Democratic Party (PSD)
- Education: University of Lisbon
- Occupation: Legal clerk

Andreia Carina Machado da Silva Neto (born 1980) is a Portuguese legal clerk, businesswoman and politician. She is a member of the Assembly of the Republic as a member of the Social Democratic Party (PSD), having been re-elected in the March 2024 national election to represent Porto.

== Education ==
Neto was born on 4 August 1980. She received a degree in law in 2003 from the Universidade Portucalense Infante D. Henrique, a private university in Porto, a postgraduate qualification in communication and political marketing from the Higher Institute of Social Sciences and Politics (ISCSP) of the University of Lisbon in 2014 and a master's degree in management and public policies in 2015 from the same university. She is married to Altino Manuel Carneiro Osório.

== Career ==
Neto began a career in law in 2005 and worked with a law firm until 2020. In that year she formed a credit intermediary company, together with her husband. A member of the Social Democratic Party, she was elected to the National Assembly as a representative of the Porto constituency in the June 2011 election, serving in the Assembly until the October 2019 election. She was re-elected to the Assembly in the January 2022 election and again in the March 2024 election when the PSD formed the Democratic Alliance (AD) coalition together with two smaller parties. In that election she was sixth on the AD list for Porto and the coalition won 14 seats in the constituency. Neto has also served as a councillor on the Santo Tirso City Council.

In the parliament, she has served on several committees, including those on Constitutional Affairs, Rights, Freedoms and Guarantees; Social Security and Labour; Environment; Spatial Planning and Local Government; and Ethics. She also served as vice-president of the PSD parliamentary group.

== Controversy ==
In October 2021, Neto and her husband applied for investment support from the Vila Nova de Famalicão City Council to establish new headquarters, but had to withdraw the application as the rules forbade such support to financial entities. The application was resubmitted, with their company described as a business consultancy, and approved. In November 2022 the Transparency and Statute of Deputies Committee instructed Neto to correct her entry in the parliamentary register of interests, following suggestions that her role as the manager of a credit company was inconsistent with the rules governing the outside interests of parliamentary deputies. In December of the same year the committee voted in favour of a motion that there was no incompatibility. Neto had argued that her company served only as an intermediary between borrowers and lenders and did not handle funds. In January 2023 she was suspended from the Assembly for 60 days for her failure to attend any session in the previous three months, a fact she attributed to having recently become a mother.
