= Sofia Andrade =

Portuguese politician

Deputy in the Portuguese Assembly of the Republic
- Incumbent
- Assumed office August 2021
- Constituency: Porto

Personal details
- Born: 29 February 1988 (age 38) Santo Tirso, Porto District, Portugal
- Party: Portuguese: Socialist Party (PS)
- Occupation: Politician

Sofia Andrade (born 1988) is a Portuguese politician. As a member of the Portuguese Socialist Party (PS), she became a deputy in the Portuguese Assembly of the Republic, representing Porto, in 2021, following the resignation of one of the incumbents, and was re-elected in the January 2022 election.

== Early life and education ==
Sofia Andrade was born in São Martinho do Campo in the municipality of Santo Tirso in the Porto metropolitan area of Portugal. She has a degree in neurophysiology from the Escola Superior de Saúde do Vale do Ave and worked as an advisor in the office of the presidency of the municipality of Santo Tirso until 2021.

== Political career ==
Andrade became a member of the executive of the Vila Nova do Campo parish council in 2013. She became active in the Socialist Youth, the youth arm of the Socialist Party, being president of the Santo Tirso branch between 2015 and 2019. She also joined the secretariat of the Porto branch of Socialist Women – Equality and Rights (MS-ID). In the 2019 Portuguese legislative election, Andrade was 20th on the list of PS candidates for the Porto constituency but the party only won 17 seats. However, following the appointment of two people on the list to ministerial and secretary of state positions and the later resignation as deputy of Ana Paula Vitorino in order to take up the post of chair of the board of directors of Portugal's Mobility and Transport Authority (AMT), Andrade became a deputy in the Assembly in August 2021. In the January 2022 national election, Andrade was ranked 18th on the PS list and was re-elected to the Assembly when the PS won 19 seats in the Porto District and won an overall majority in the Assembly.
