= Sónia Monteiro =

Portuguese politician (born 1980)

Sónia Cristina de Sousa Monteiro

Member of the Assembly of the Republic
- Incumbent
- Assumed office 26 March 2024
- Constituency: Porto

Personal details
- Born: 22 March 1980 (age 46) Felgueiras, Porto District, Portugal
- Party: CHEGA
- Occupation: Politician

Sónia Cristina de Sousa Monteiro (born 22 March 1980) is a Portuguese politician and journalist. In the 2024 Portuguese national election she was elected to the Assembly of the Republic as a representative of the right-wing CHEGA party, being re-elected in the 2025 national election.

== Early life ==
Monteiro was born in Felgueiras in the Porto District of the north of Portugal on 22 March 1980.

== Political career ==
CHEGA was a new party, with right-wing to far-right policies, that won just one seat in the 2019 national election and twelve seats in the 2022 election. In the March 2024 election, Monteiro was chosen to be sixth on the party's list of candidates for the Porto constituency, with the party hoping to win either five or six seats in the constituency. It won seven of the 40 available in the constituency and 50 seats overall in the country, making it the third largest party in the Assembly, and Monteiro was elected.

Following allegations of conflicts of interest in relation to the prime minister's family business, the government called a confidence vote on 11 March 2025, which it lost. A snap legislative election then took place on 18 May 2025 to elect members for the 17th Legislature. All 230 seats to the Assembly of the Republic were up for election. Monteiro was again sixth on CHEGA's list of candidates for Porto, being re-elected when the party won nine seats.

Her 2024 campaign included emphasis on reducing outmigration of youth from rural areas. In the parliament she was appointed to the Committee on Culture, Communication, Youth and Sport. After the 2025 election, in which CHEGA became the official opposition, she became a member of the Ad hoc Committee for Verifying the Powers of Elected Deputies.
