= Marcus Santos =

Member of the Assembly of the Republic
- Incumbent
- Assumed office 26 March 2024
- Constituency: Porto

Personal details
- Born: Marcus Vinícius Teixeira Soares dos Santos; 17 April 1979 (age 46) Rio de Janeiro, Brazil
- Citizenship: Brazil • Portugal
- Party: Chega
- Children: 1
- Occupation: Mixed martial arts athlete • Politician

Marcus Vinícius Teixeira Soares dos Santos (born 17 April 1979) is a Brazilian-Portuguese politician and former mixed-martial arts athlete.

He has served as a deputy in the Assembly of the Republic for the Porto representing the Chega party since 2024.

== Biography ==
=== Early life ===
Santos was born in Rio de Janeiro, Brazil in 1979. His father was employed by the Brazilian military. At the age of 18, he lived in the United States before moving to Portugal in 2009 after marrying a Portuguese woman by whom he has a son. Santos was a mixed martial arts fighter before becoming a fitness instructor and the owner of a gym.

=== Politics ===
Santos has reportedly been involved in Brazilian politics and in 2016 returned to Brazil to support protests against then President Dilma Rousseff. Two years later, he campaigned in support of Jair Bolsonaro before become active in local politics in Portugal.

In 2024, he was part of Chega's list for the Porto constituency and was elected to the Assembly of the Republic. His candidacy was endorsed by Eduardo Bolsonaro. Following his election, he wrote on social media "the racist, fascist extreme left and the lying media will have to deal with Chega's black guy." Although born in Brazil, Santos stated his mission in politics is "to defend the Portuguese" and is therefore against the entry of immigrants except for economic reasons. He also refers to himself "the black guy from Chega" but has said "Portugal is white" and "Europe is white, just as Africa is black."
