= Francisco Sousa Vieira =

Portuguese politician (born 1993)

Member of the Assembly of the Republic
- Incumbent
- Assumed office 26 March 2024
- Constituency: Porto

Personal details
- Born: 21 October 1993 (age 32)
- Party: Social Democratic Party

Francisco José de Sousa Vieira (born 21 October 1993) is a Portuguese politician serving as a member of the Assembly of the Republic since 2024. He is the president of the Social Democratic Party in Marco de Canaveses.
