= Raul Melo =

Portuguese politician (born 1969)

Member of the Assembly of the Republic
- Constituency: Porto
- Incumbent
- Assumed office March 26, 2024

Personal details
- Born: Raúl Gabriel Palha de Bessa Melo; 23 June 1969 (age 56) Gondomar, Portugal
- Party: Chega
- Occupation: Politician

Raúl Gabriel Palha de Bessa Melo (born 23 June 1969) is a Portuguese politician of the Chega party who has been a deputy in the Assembly of the Republic since 2024 representing the Porto constituency.

== Biography ==
Melo was born in Gondomar before moving to Baião in 2007. He worked for several years as an operations manager for the Metro do Porto.

In 2024, Melo was elected to the Assembly of the Republic to represent the Porto constituency on Chega's list. He serves on the committee for energy and transport in the Assembly. He has been a municipal councilor for Chega in Baião since 2021.
