= Patrícia Ribeiro Faro =

Portuguese psychologist and politician

Deputy in the Portuguese Assembly of the Republic
- Incumbent
- Assumed office 2022
- Constituency: Porto

Personal details
- Born: 1972 (age 53–54) Matosinhos, Porto District, Portugal
- Party: Portuguese: Socialist Party (PS)
- Occupation: Psychologist and politician

Patrícia Ribeiro Faro (born 1972) is a Portuguese psychologist and politician. As a member of the Portuguese Socialist Party (PS), she was elected as a deputy in the Portuguese Assembly of the Republic in January 2022, representing Porto and was re-elected in the 2024 election.

== Early life and education ==
Patrícia Ribeiro Faro was born in 1972 in Matosinhos, a coastal city to the northwest of Porto in Portugal. She graduated in social work in 1996 from the Instituto Superior de Serviço Social do Porto (ISSSP) in the area of justice and social reintegration. In 2003 she completed post-graduate studies on legal problems and drug addiction. In December 2012, she obtained a master's degree in legal psychology from the Fernando Pessoa University with a dissertation on Representations of victims of domestic violence in the criminal justice system. In 2014 she received qualifications in victim support. She has been studying for a PhD in sociology at the Faculty of Arts of the University of Porto.

== Career ==
Since 2005, Faro has been the technical director of the Portuguese Red Cross shelter in Matosinhos for women and children who are victims of domestic violence and president of the Matosinhos Red Cross since 2008. She participated in the design and development of an Emergency Shelter House intended for the temporary reception of female victims of domestic violence, and their children. Since 2014, she has been vice-president of the Porto Red Cross. In April 2021 she was appointed as a specialist government advisor to the Office of the Secretary of State for Citizenship and Equality.

== Political life ==
Faro became a deputy in the Porto municipal assembly in 2017. In July 2020 she was elected president of Porto Socialist Women – Equality and Rights (MS-ID) for the 2020–2022 term. In the January 2022 Portuguese legislative election she was elected to the National Assembly, being 15th on the Socialist Party's list for the Porto constituency. The PS won 19 seats in Porto and an overall majority in the country. She was re-elected in 2024, being fifth on the PS list of candidates.
