= Alberto Machado (politician) =

Portuguese politician (born 1978)

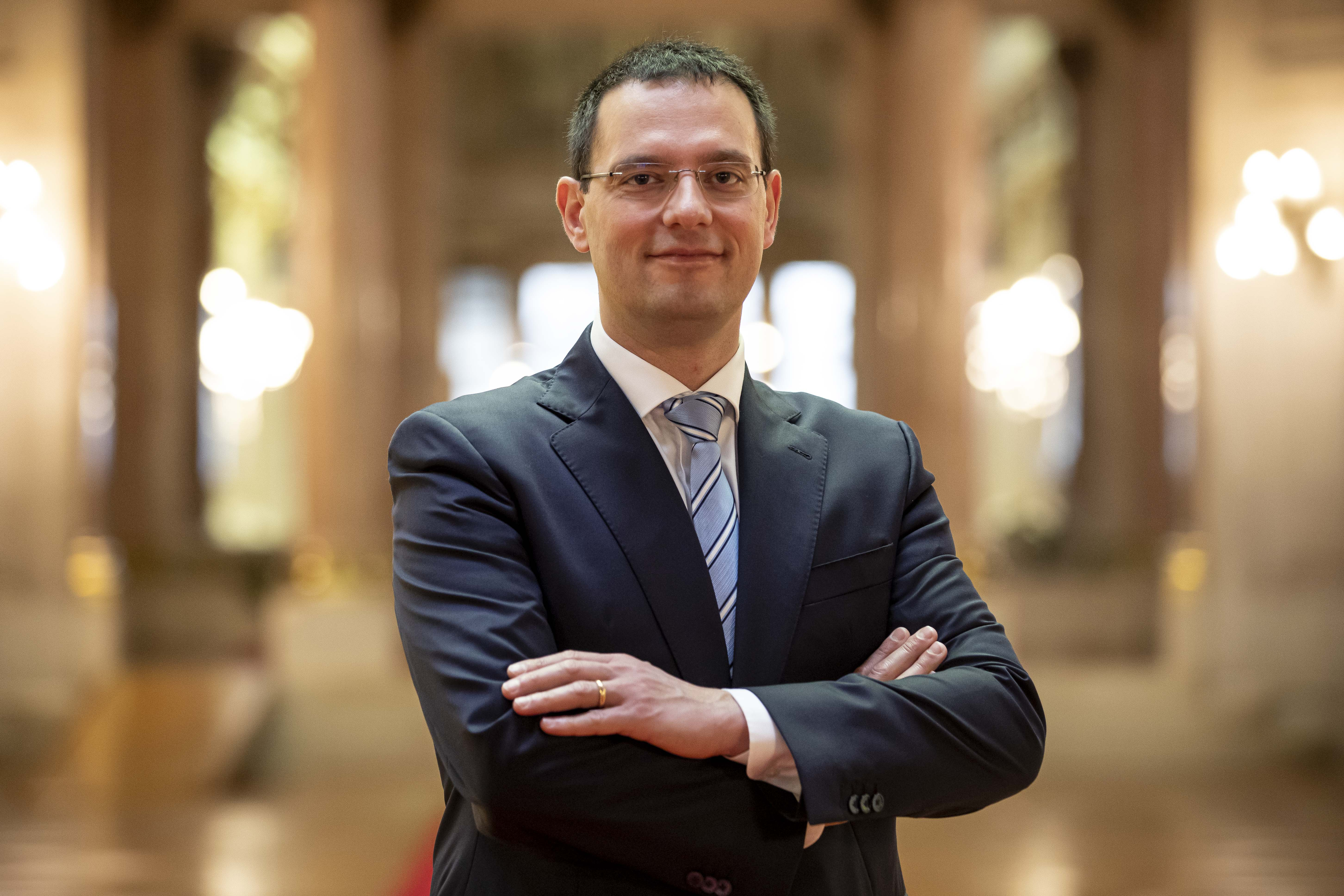
- Machado in 2020

Member of the Assembly of the Republic
- Incumbent
- Assumed office 26 March 2024
- Constituency: Porto
- In office 25 October 2019 – 28 March 2022
- Constituency: Porto

Personal details
- Born: 7 August 1978 (age 47)
- Party: Social Democratic Party

Alberto Amaro Guedes Machado (born 7 August 1978) is a Portuguese politician. He has been a member of the Assembly of the Republic since 2024, having previously served from 2019 to 2022. From 2009 to 2021, he served as mayor of Paranhos. From 2021 to 2025, he was a member of the Porto Municipal Chamber.
