= Hugo Carneiro =

Portuguese politician (born 1982)

Member of the Assembly of the Republic
- Incumbent
- Assumed office 25 October 2019
- Constituency: Porto

Personal details
- Born: 20 May 1982 (age 43)
- Party: Social Democratic Party

Hugo Miguel de Sousa Carneiro (born 20 May 1982) is a Portuguese politician serving as a member of the Assembly of the Republic since 2019. He previously served as deputy secretary-general of the Social Democratic Party.
