= Olga Freire =

Portuguese politician (born 1969)

Member of the Assembly of the Republic
- Incumbent
- Assumed office 26 March 2024
- Constituency: Porto District

President of the Maia Municipal Assembly
- Incumbent
- Assumed office 2013

Personal details
- Born: 24 September 1969 (age 56)
- Party: Social Democratic Party
- Occupation: Politician • lawyer

Olga Cristina Rodrigues da Veiga Freire (born 1969) is a Portuguese politician and lawyer. In the March 2024 national election she was elected as a deputy in the 16th legislature of the Assembly of the Republic of Portugal, as a member of the Social Democratic Party (PSD).

== Early life and education ==
Freire was born on 24 September 1969 in Porto. She obtained a degree in law from the Lusíada University of Porto. In 2003 she moved to Maia, a short distance to the north of Porto.

== Political career ==
Freire was formerly president of the parish assembly of Vermoim, situated in the Maia municipality. In 2013 she became president of the Maia Municipal Assembly, the first woman to hold this position. She has also been a vice president of the board of directors of the National Association of Parishes (ANAFRE) and a member of the national committee of Social Democratic mayors. In the 2024 national election, the PSD formed a coalition with two smaller parties, called the Democratic Alliance (AD), and Freire was ninth on the AD list of candidates for the Porto constituency, being elected to the National Assembly when the AD won 14 of the available 40 seats. In parliament she became a member of the Local Power and Territorial Cohesion Committee.

In April 2023, after the Russian invasion of Ukraine, Freire was among a delegation from the Porto area that attended the “Summit of Mayors, United Cities for the Future” in the Ukrainian capital of Kyiv, where she witnessed some of the damage caused by the invasion.
