= Carla Barros =

Portuguese politician

Member of the Assembly of the Republic
- Incumbent
- Assumed office 26 March 2024
- Constituency: Porto District
- In office 2015–2022
- In office 2009–2011

Personal details
- Born: Carla Maria Gomes Barros; 8 February 1980 (age 46)
- Party: Social Democratic Party
- Occupation: Human resources manager • politician

Carla Maria Gomes Barros (born 1980) is a Portuguese politician and a human resources manager. She is a deputy in the 16th legislature of the Assembly of the Republic of Portugal, as a member of the Social Democratic Party (PSD), having previously also served in the 11th, 13th, and 14th legislatures.

== Early life and education ==
Barros was born on 8 February 1980. She lives in Póvoa de Varzim in the Porto District. She has a degree in human resources management, specialising in public administration, and post-graduate training in public administration, with a specialisation in gender equality.

== Career ==
Barros has worked as a programme coordinator in the public sector with the Northern Regional Coordination and Development Commission (CCDR-NORTE), which is a public institution aiming at the integrated and sustainable development of the north of Portugal. She has also been director of the Matosinhos Employment Centre.

== Political career ==
She was first elected to the parliament in 2009, serving in the 11th legislature. She was not elected to the 12th legislature but returned to the National Assembly in 2015 as a deputy in the 13th legislature and was re-elected in 2019, serving until 2022. In that year she was not re-elected, following a dominant victory by the Socialist Party. For the 2024 national election the PSD formed an alliance with two smaller parties, known as the Democratic Alliance (AD) and Barros was 15th on the AD's list for the Porto constituency, with the AD winning sufficient votes for 14 seats. However, following the decision of the director of the Faculty of Economics of the University of Porto, Óscar Afonso, who had been fourth on the list, not to take his place in the parliament, Barros was promoted. Newspapers had suggested that Afonso had been hoping to be made minister of finance and resigned once that position was given to someone else.
