= Cecília Meireles (politician) =

Portuguese politician

Member of the Assembly of the Republic
- In office 15 October 2009 – 28 March 2022
- Constituency: Porto

Secretary of State for Tourism
- In office 21 June 2011 – 1 February 2013
- Prime Minister: Pedro Passos Coelho
- Preceded by: Bernardo Trindade
- Succeeded by: Adolfo Mesquita Nunes

Personal details
- Born: Cecília Felgueiras de Meireles Graça; 29 May 1977 (age 49) Porto, Portugal
- Party: CDS – People's Party (1992–present)
- Other political affiliations: People's Youth (1992–2007)
- Education: University of Coimbra
- Occupation: Lawyer

Cecília Felgueiras de Meireles Graça (born 29 May 1977) is a Portuguese politician and lawyer, and a former member of the Assembly of the Republic of Portugal, representing the Christian democratic CDS – People's Party (CDS-PP) for the Porto constituency.

== Early life ==
Cecília Felgueiras de Meireles Graça was born in Cedofeita in the Porto municipality on 29 May 1977. She was the first of three daughters of José Maria Ferreira de Meireles Graça and Maria Henriqueta Guimarães Jordão Felgueiras. She graduated in Law from the Faculty of Law of the University of Coimbra and then obtained an MBA from the School of Management of the University of Porto Business School (UPBS). She then worked as a legal advisor to Porto City Council until 2009.

== Political career ==
Meireles was first elected as Deputy to the Assembly of the Republic in 2009, representing the CDS-PP. She was re-elected in 2011, 2015, and 2019, always for the Porto constituency on the CDS-PP list. She is vice-president of the CDS-PP parliamentary group. In parliament she has been on the Budget and Finance committee and vice-president of the Agriculture and Sea committee, as well as on various working groups. Between 2011 and 2015 she served as Secretary of State for Tourism, when the CDS-PP was part of a a coalition government headed by Pedro Passos Coelho. Meireles has also served as a member of the Municipal Assembly of Porto and the Parish Assembly of Ramalde.

In 2020 she was the focus of some controversy within her party after a proposal was made by the party's vice-president that she should resign her seat in the Assembly to make way for the leader of the CDS-PP, Francisco Rodrigues dos Santos. Santos was elected leader of the party in January 2020 but did not have a seat in the Assembly. He had been second on the party's list for Porto in the 2019 elections but only Meireles, top of the list, was elected. If she had resigned, Santos would have automatically taken her place. However, she had, at the same time, been criticising the leadership of Santos. She was not included in the CDS-PP list of candidates for the 2022 election, in which the party performed poorly.
