= Álvaro Castello-Branco =

Portuguese politician and lawyer (born 1961)

Adjunct Secretary of State and of National Defence
- Incumbent
- Assumed office 5 April 2024
- Prime Minister: Luís Montenegro
- Minister: Nuno Melo

Vice President of the CDS – People's Party
- Incumbent
- Assumed office 3 April 2022
- President: Nuno Melo
- Preceded by: Filipe Lobo d'Ávila

Member of the Assembly of the Republic
- In office 23 October 2015 – 24 October 2019
- Constituency: Porto
- In office 25 October 1995 – 9 October 2005
- Constituency: Porto

Deputy Mayor of Porto
- In office 9 October 2005 – 24 January 2012
- President: Rui Rio

President of the CDS – People's Party of Porto
- In office 14 July 1998 – 17 June 2018
- Preceded by: Antonino de Sousa
- Succeeded by: Fernando Barbosa

Personal details
- Born: Álvaro António Magalhães Ferrão de Castello-Branco; 16 April 1961 (age 65) Bomfim, Porto, Portugal
- Party: CDS – People's Party
- Children: 2
- Education: Catholic University of Portugal
- Occupation: Lawyer • politician

Álvaro António Magalhães Ferrão de Castello-Branco (born 16 April 1961) is a Portuguese lawyer and politician. He was a member of the Assembly of the Republic between 1999 and 2009, and again between 2015 and 2019, for the CDS – People's Party.

He is currently the vice President of CDS/PP party since 2022. He was President of CDS/PP of the Porto District and also Deputy Mayor of Porto, between 2005 and 2012.

In January 2024, he was announced as sixteenth place on the Party lists for the 2024 Portuguese legislative election, of Democratic Alliance's Porto list for the 2024 Portuguese legislative election, but wasn't elected.
