= Isabel Oneto =

Portuguese politician (born 1959)

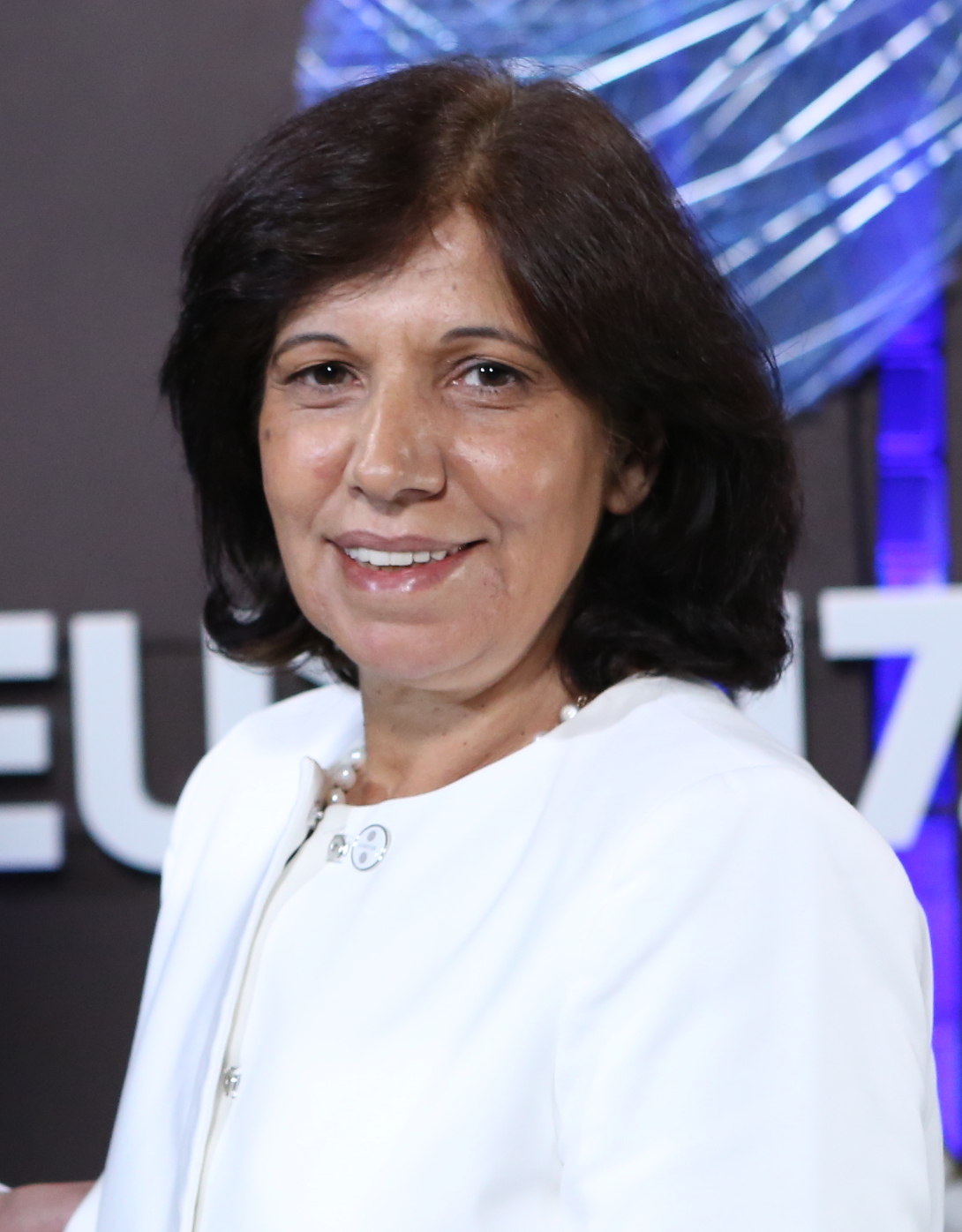

Deputy in the Portuguese Assembly of the Republic
- Incumbent
- Assumed office 2019
- Constituency: Porto

Assistant Secretary of State and Internal Administration, Portugal
- In office 2017–2019

Personal details
- Born: 14 September 1959 (age 66) Portugal
- Party: Portuguese: Socialist Party (PS)
- Spouse: Fernando António Pereira Pinto
- Occupation: Politician

Isabel Oneto (born 1959) is a Portuguese politician. As a member of the Portuguese Socialist Party (PS), she has been a deputy in the Portuguese Assembly of the Republic from 2009 to 2015 and from 2019 to the present, representing Porto. Between 2017 and 2019 she served as Assistant Secretary of State and Internal Administration.

== Early life and education ==
Maria Isabel Solnado Porto Oneto was born in the Portuguese capital of Lisbon on 14 September 1959. Her father was an opponent of the authoritarian Estado Novo government who was arrested by the regime. The family name of Oneto comes from a carpenter from Genoa in Italy who accompanied Maria Pia of Savoy when she went to Portugal to marry King Luís I of Portugal. Isabel Oneto is a cousin to the late Raul Solnado, a well-known Portuguese actor. Oneto graduated in law from the Moderna University (Universidade Moderna) and obtained a master's in criminal law from the Faculty of Law at the University of Coimbra.

== Career ==
Between 1979 and 2000, Oneto was an assistant professor of law at the Universidade Lusófona in Porto. She also worked as a journalist for ANOP (Agência Noticiosa Portuguesa), now known as the Lusa News Agency (Lusa – Agência de Notícias de Portugal, SA).

== Political career ==
Oneto served as councillor at Porto City Council from 2001 to 2005, becoming the civil governor of Porto District in 2005, a position she held until 2009. In 2009, as a member of the Socialist Party (PS), she was elected as a deputy in the National Assembly for the Porto constituency, serving until 2015. In October 2017, Oneto was appointed as Assistant Secretary of State and Internal Administration, a position she held for two years. Returning to the parliament in 2020, she was re-elected in the 2022 election as the fourth person on the PS list for the Porto District. The Socialist Party won 19 seats in the constituency and an overall majority in the Assembly.

During her time in the Assembly, Oneto has been a member of the Committee on Constitutional Affairs, Rights, Freedoms and Guarantees and the Committee on European Affairs.
