= Diogo Pacheco de Amorim =

Portuguese politician (born 1949)

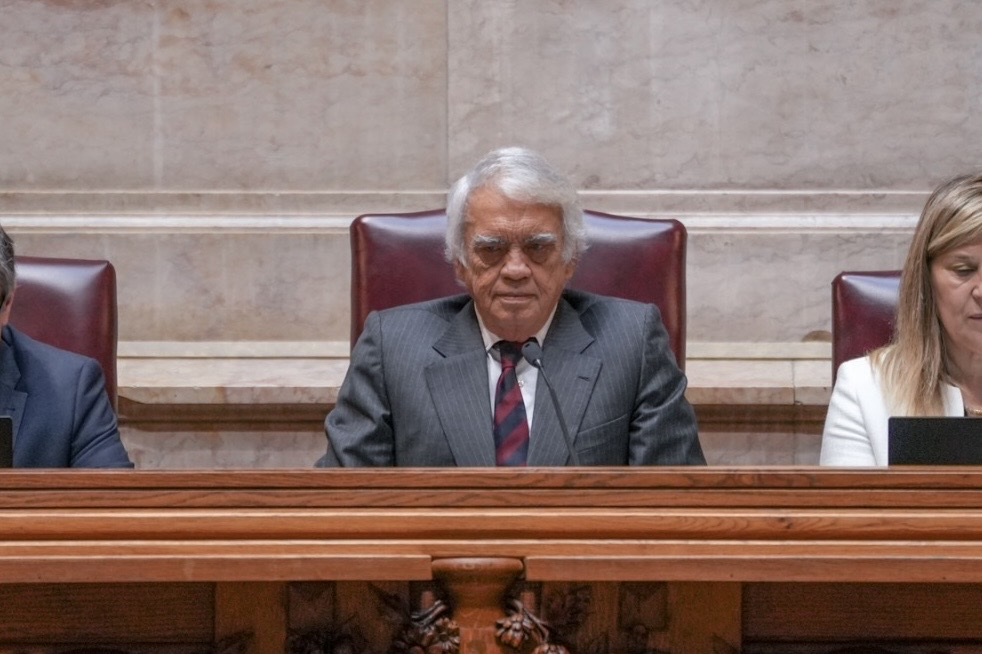
- Pacheco de Amorim in 2024

Vice President of the Assembly of the Republic
- Incumbent
- Assumed office 17 June 2025
- President: José Pedro Aguiar-Branco
- In office 27 March 2024 – 2 June 2025
- President: José Pedro Aguiar-Branco

Member of the Assembly of the Republic
- Incumbent
- Assumed office 29 March 2022
- Constituency: Porto
- In office 14 September 2021 – 8 October 2021
- Constituency: Lisbon

Personal details
- Born: Diogo Velez Mouta Pacheco de Amorim; 10 March 1949 (age 77) Lisbon, Portugal
- Party: Chega (2019–present)
- Other political affiliations: MDLP (1975–1976); MIRN-PDP (1976–1979); CDS–PP (1979–2003, 2010–2019); PND (2003–2010)
- Education: Coimbra University

Diogo Velez Mouta Pacheco de Amorim (born 10 March 1949) is a Portuguese politician of the Chega and since 2022 a member of the Assembly of the Republic representing Porto.

== Biography ==
Pacheco de Amorim was born in Lisbon in 1949 and is the grandson of a monarchist politician close to António de Oliveira Salazar. He studied philosophy at Coimbra University. During his time as a student, he was active in the Independent Movement for the National Reconstruction / Party of the Portuguese Right and organizations that contested decolonization. He later became an advisor to deputy Prime Minister Diogo Freitas do Amaral.

In 2019, Pacheco de Amorim left CDS – People's Party of which he had been a longstanding member and joined Chega. Between 9 September and 8 October 2021 he was appointed as deputy to the Assembly of the Republic, replacing Chega leader André Ventura who temporarily resigned to oversee the municipal elections that year. In his maiden speech, he paid tribute to former president Jorge Sampaio.

During the 2022 Portuguese legislative election, Pacheco de Amorim was returned to the Assembly as a deputy for the Porto constituency.

In his political beliefs, Pacheco de Amorim has called himself a liberal conservative. He calls for a “depoliticization” of the education system and the right to give families the primacy of transmitting social values to children. According to him, schools should be concerned with consolidating the “Judeo-Christian” and civic “cultural and civilizational values”, including “discipline and respect for elders, teachers, authority.” Pacheco de Amorim has also called for Portugal's departure from the United Nations, as according to him it is "an agency for the dissemination of cultural Marxism and mass globalism." He also supports stricter laws on the granting of Portuguese citizenship and for zero tolerance policies on illegal immigration, but supports legal immigration and compulsory policies for immigrants to work and not be allowed to claim social security benefits until after a certain period.

Following the Russian invasion of Ukraine, Pacheco de Amorim called on the Portuguese government to support Ukraine and condemned the Portuguese Communist Party, stating PCP's stance is “at least ambiguous and at most clearly reprehensible." He also argued Portugal should boost its defense spending following the invasion.
