= Rui Afonso =

Portuguese politician

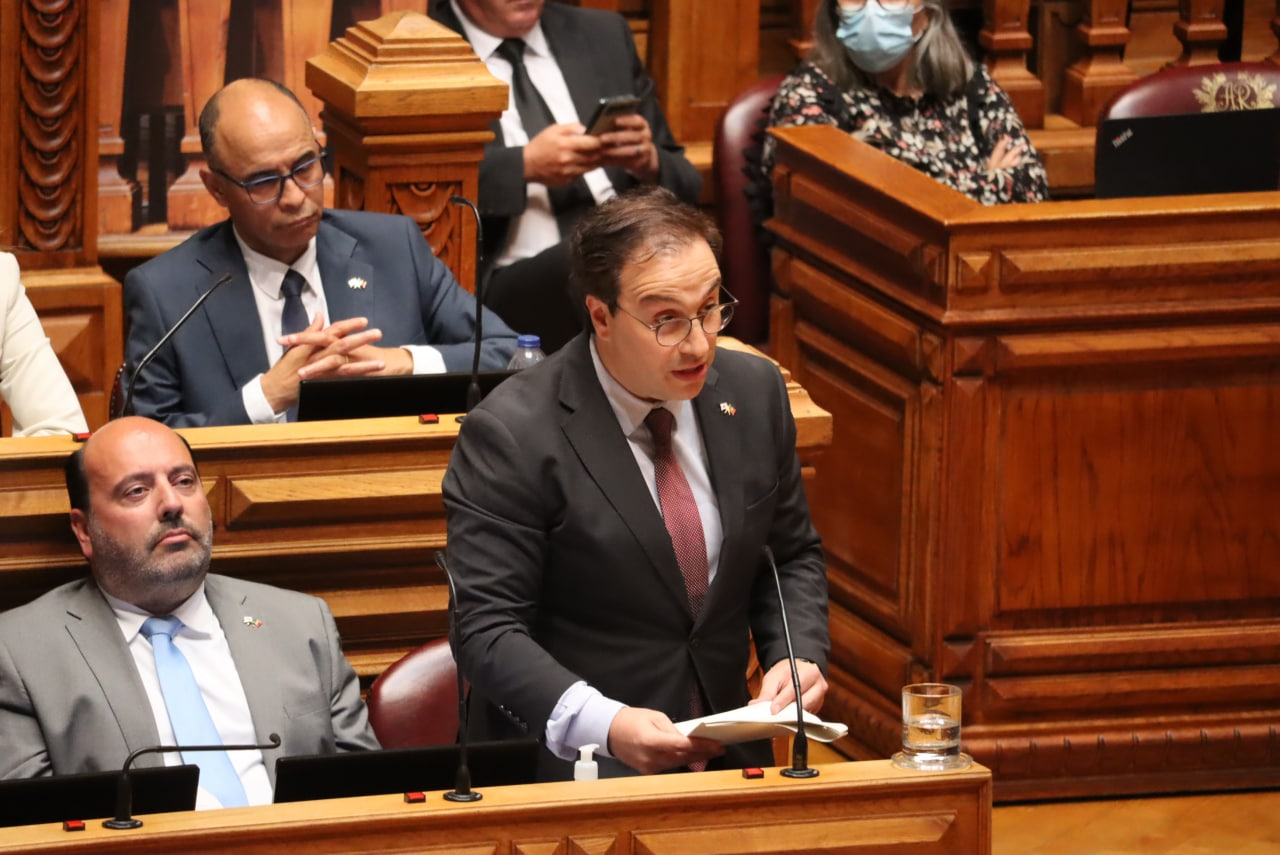

Member of the Assembly of the Republic
- Incumbent
- Assumed office March 29, 2022
- Constituency: Porto

Personal details
- Born: Rui Pedro da Silva Afonso; 28 November 1979 (age 46) Porto, Portugal
- Party: Chega
- Education: University of A Coruña

Rui Afonso (born 28 November 1979) is a Portuguese politician of the Chega party who has been a member of the Assembly of the Republic since 2022 representing the Porto constituency.

== Biography ==
Afonso studied a PhD in finance at the University of A Coruña in Spain. He began his professional career as an international insurance broker and then worked in the credit recovery department of a Portuguese finance company.

He joined Chega in 2019 and took over as head of the party in Porto after the original regional chairman resigned. In 2021, he was elected as a municipal councilor in Porto.

During the 2022 Portuguese legislative election, Afonso was elected to represent the Porto constituency. He has described himself as a conservative politically. In the Assembly, he has called for tougher anti-corruption and law & order policies, such as life imprisonment and chemical castration for convicted pedophiles.
