= Sérgio Vieira (politician) =

Mozambican politician (1941–2021)

Sérgio Vieira (4 May 1941 – 16 December 2021) was a Mozambican politician and poet. He was Director of the Department of Education and Culture for Frelimo, Governor of the Banco de Moçambique (Bank of Mozambique) and Minister of Security and of Agriculture.

== Life and work ==
Vieira was born in Tete, Mozambique, on 4 May 1941. He was the great-grandson of pt:Julião José da Silva Vieira, a Portuguese soldier and colonial administrator, and maternal cousin to Orlando da Costa, a Portuguese writer.

At a young age, Vieira became a political activist, and graduated in political science. During university studies, he was part of the youth opposition movement Empire Students' House. During exile in Dar-es-Salam, he headed the FRELIMO Culture and Education Department. After the independence of his country, he held the position of Governor of the Banco de Moçambique and Minister of Internal Administration.

Vieira died on 16 December 2021, at the age of 80.

=== Literature ===
Vieira's literary works are in Portuguese. He collaborated with some newspapers and magazines such as Jornal de Angola (Angola Newspaper) and is also included in many anthologies of poetry. His main model is Marcelino dos Santos.
