= Luísa Salgueiro =

Portuguese politician

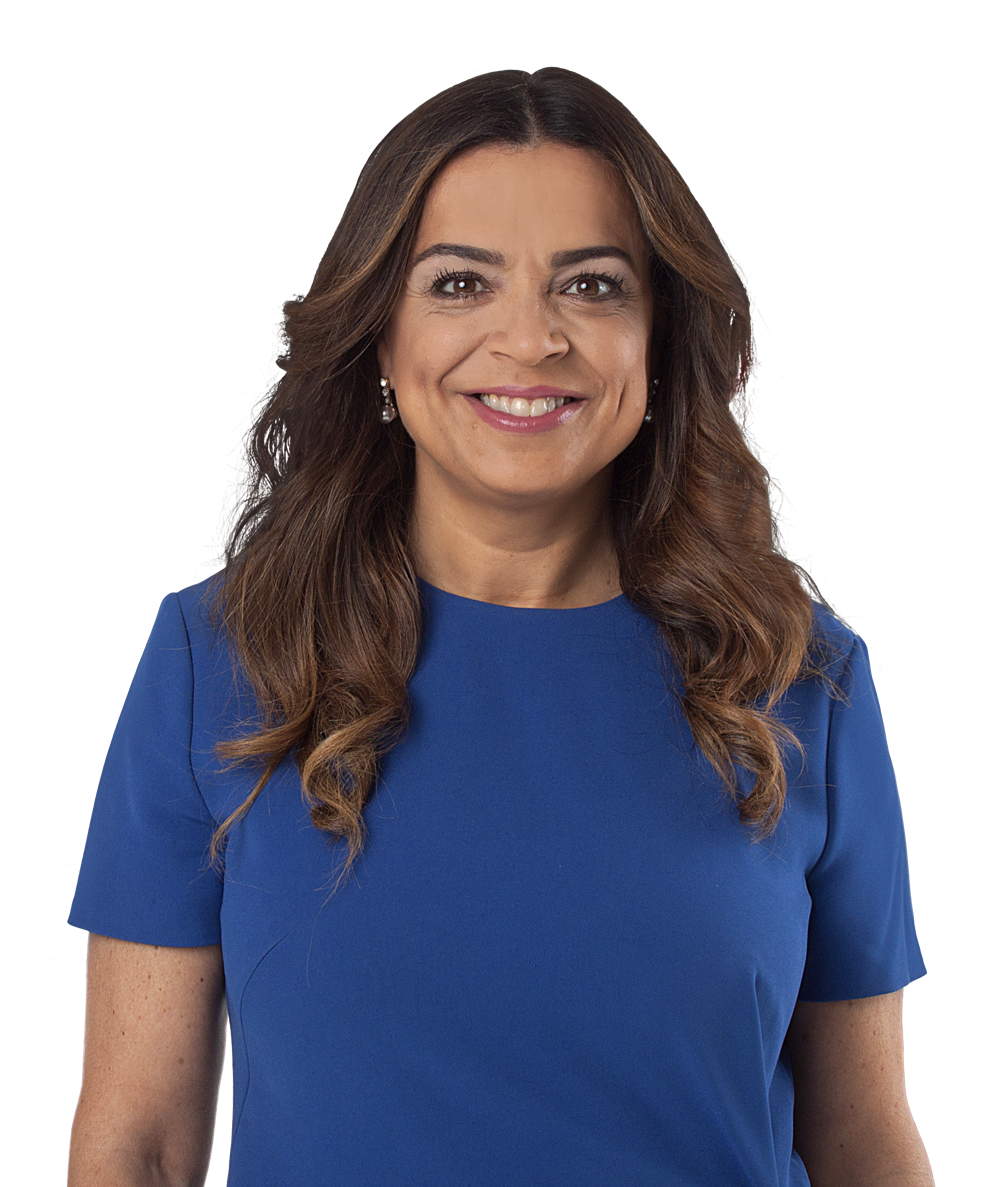

Mayor of Matosinhos
- Incumbent
- Assumed office 2017
- Parliamentary group: Portuguese Socialist Party (PS)

Member of the Assembly of the Republic of Portugal
- In office 2005–2017

Personal details
- Born: Luísa Maria Neves Salgueiro; 2 January 1968 (age 58) Matosinhos, Portugal
- Party: Portuguese: Socialist Party (PS)
- Spouse: Mário José de Almeida Gomes Morais Esteves
- Children: One daughter
- Education: Catholic University of Portugal

Luísa Salgueiro (born 2 January 1968) is a Portuguese politician and a legal consultant. Between 2005 and 2017, she was a Deputy in the Assembly of the Republic, representing the Portuguese Socialist Party (PS) in the Porto constituency. At the end of 2017, she resigned in order to take up the role of mayor of Matosinhos in the Porto District, the first woman to hold this position.

== Career ==
Luísa Maria Neves Salgueiro was born in Matosinhos on 2 January 1968. After obtaining a Law Degree from the Catholic University of Portugal she went on to do postgraduate studies in Environmental Law at the Lusíada University in Lisbon and also studied consumer law at the Université catholique de Louvain in Belgium. She worked as a legal advisor to the Porto City Council and also worked with DECO, a consumer-protection organization. She was also a member of the Matosinhos Youth Advisory Council, and it was this activity that led to her involvement in local politics. In 1997 she became a councillor for the Municipality of Matosinhos. She was elected Deputy in the Assembly of the Republic in the 2005 legislative elections, staying in the Assembly until 2017, when she resigned in order to take up the position of mayor of Matosinhos, the first woman to hold that post. She is married to Mário José de Almeida Gomes Morais Esteves and they have one daughter.

== National Assembly ==
For part of her time in the National Assembly, Salgueiro served as vice-president and coordinator of the Socialist Party Parliamentary Group, for the areas of Health, Labour and Social Security. She was a member of the Parliamentary Commission on Education and Science as well as the Parliamentary Commission on Health and the Working Group on Monitoring the Problem of Diabetes. She was also elected as vice-president of the Commission for Energy and Environmental Security, one of five parliamentary commissions of NATO.

== Journalism ==
Salgueiro has been a frequent columnist in national and regional newspapers. She has written for the local papers Jornal de Matosinhos, Notícias de Matosinhos and O Matosinhense. Nationally, she regularly publishes articles in Diário de Notícias, Jornal de Notícias , and Público. Her national articles have paid particular attention to matters of health and to Portugal's Serviço Nacional de Saúde or national health service.
