= Honório Novo =

Portuguese politician (born 1950)

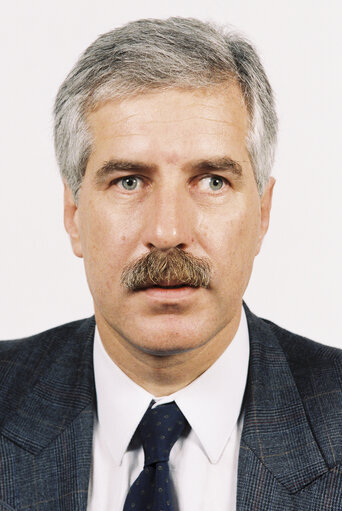
- Official portrait as an MEP, 1994

Member of the European Parliament
- In office 28 September 1994 – 19 July 1999
- Constituency: Portugal

Member of the Assembly of the Republic
- In office 25 October 1999 – 24 July 2013
- Constituency: Porto

Personal details
- Born: José Honório Faria Gonçalves Novo; 24 October 1950 (age 75) Barcelos, Braga District, Portugal
- Party: Portuguese Communist Party
- Education: University of Porto
- Occupation: Politician
- Profession: Electrical engineer, teacher

José Honório Faria Gonçalves Novo (born 24 October 1950, in Barcelos) is a Portuguese politician and a retired secondary school teacher, member of the Portuguese Communist Party (PCP).

As a student, he belonged to the Choir of Letters of the University of Porto, and whose board came to chair. Furthermore, he was also chairman of the board of Theatrical Culture Circle – Experimental Theatre of Porto. He earned a degree in electrical engineering and later became a high-school teacher.

With regard to his political career, he was elected a deputy of the Assembly of the Republic for the PCP in the VIII, IX, X, XI and XII legislatures, having resigned to his parliamentary seat on 24 July 2013. Between 1990 and 1994, he was an alderman (vereador) in the Municipal Chamber of Vila Nova de Gaia and, later, in 1994, he became a Member of the European Parliament, where he served for 5 years. After leaving the European Parliament, he was elected as councillor to the Municipal Chamber of Matosinhos, where he was alderman between 2001 and 2009. He was awarded the Municipal Medal of Merit from the Municipality of Vila Nova de Gaia.

Divorced, he has two daughters, their names Mariana (graduated in Veterinary Medicine) and Sofia (bachelor of arts in music from the Conservatory of Antwerp).
