= Manuel António dos Santos =

Portuguese politician

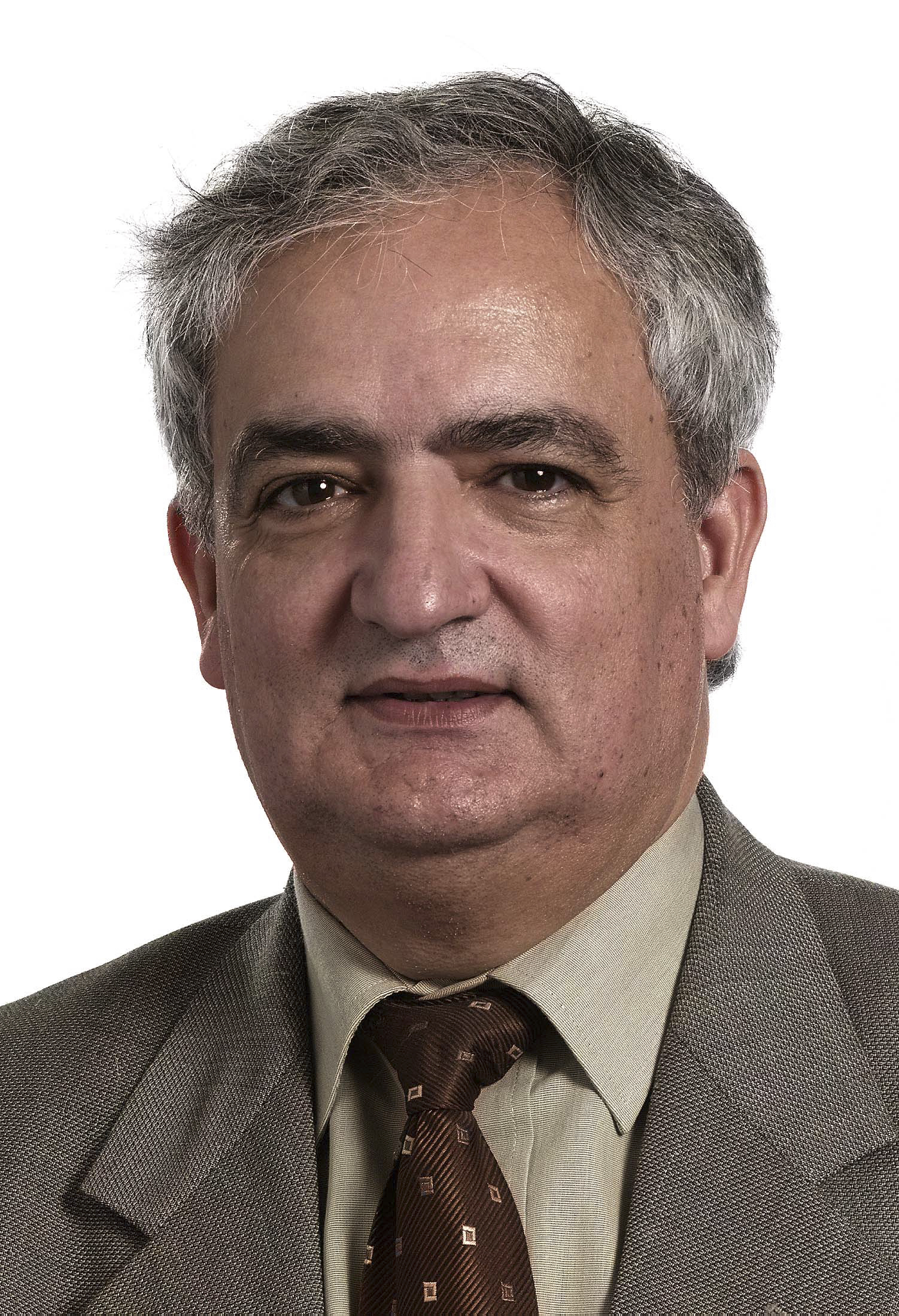
dos Santos in 1999

Manuel António dos Santos (born 5 December 1943 in Mirandela) is a Portuguese politician who served as Member of the European Parliament for the Socialist Party, part of the Party of European Socialists, from 2001 until 2019.
