= José Lello =

Portuguese politician (1944–2016)

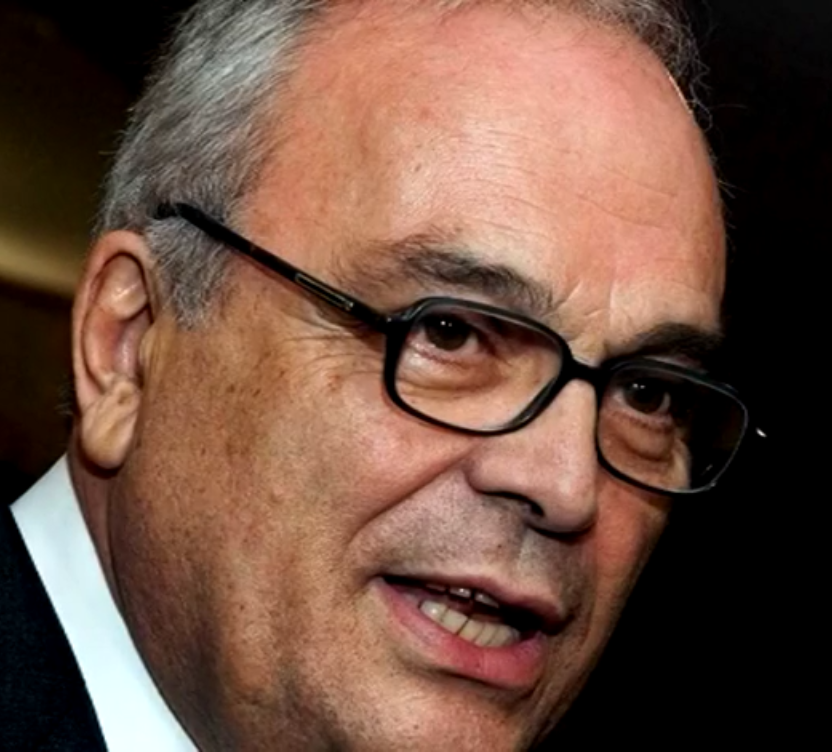
Lello in 2016

José Lello (18 May 1944 – 14 October 2016) was a Portuguese politician who served as President of NATO Parliamentary Assembly, Minister and Secretary of State in Cabinet of Portugal and member of Assembly of the Republic of Portugal.

== Honors and awards ==
=== Honors ===
- NATO Parliamentary Assembly mourns his death
- Ministry of Foreign Affairs deeply regretted his death
- Boavista F.C. put their flag at half mast on his death

=== Awards ===
- Grand Cross of the Order of Infante D. Henrique (Portugal)
- Grand Cross of the Order of Honor (Greece)
- Grand Cross of the Order of Rio Branco (Brazil)
- Grand Cruz do Cruzeiro do Sul (Brazil)
- Grand Cross of the Order of Leopold II (Belgium)
- Grand Cross of the Order of Merit (R.F.A.)
- Grand Cross of the Order of Civil Merit (Spain)
- Grand Collar of the Order of the Liberator (Venezuela)
- Aguilla Azteca - Grade Banda (Mexico)
- Grand Collar of the Wissan Alavita Order and Officer of the Wissan Alavita Order (Morocco)
- Grand Officer of Merit (France)
- Grand Officer of the Order of Merit (Luxembourg)
