= Independent Movement for the National Reconstruction / Party of the Portuguese Right =

Independent Movement for the National Reconstruction / Party of the Portuguese Right Movimento Independente para a Reconstrução Nacional / Partido da Direita Portuguesa
- Leader: Kaúlza de Arriaga
- Founded: 23 December 1976
- Dissolved: 12 June 1997
- Ideology: Nationalism; Neosalazarism; Integralismo Lusitano; National conservatism Right-wing populism Protectionism; Corporatism; Anti-communism
- Political position: Right-wing to far-right
- Colours: Blue

The Independent Movement for the National Reconstruction / Party of the Portuguese Right (MIRN-PDP, Portuguese: Movimento Independente para a Reconstrução Nacional / Partido da Direita Portuguesa) was a Portuguese political party. MIRN became an official political party on 7 March 1979 and was officially dissolved on 12 June 1997 (Acórdão 674/97 of the Constitutional Court) as it was found to be inactive since 30 June 1984. Using the name of PDP, it took part in only one election, the 1980 legislative election, as a part of a coalition of right-wing parties, but failed to win any seats.

== History ==
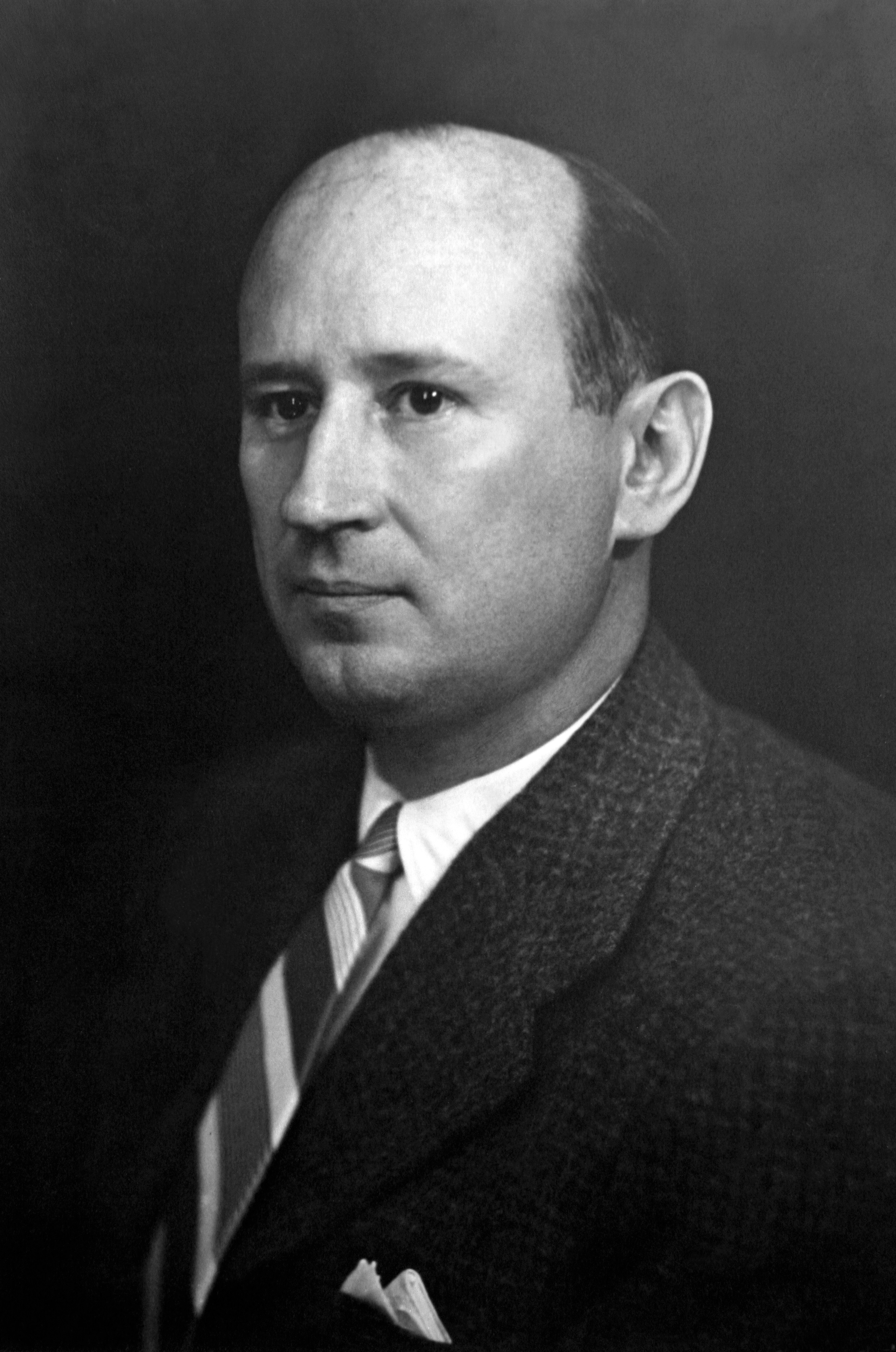
MIRN-PDP's leader, Kaúlza de Arriaga

The Independent Movement for the National Reconstruction (MIRN) was created by General Káulza de Arriaga, who became its president, in early 1977. It addressed its propaganda towards the ultranationalist youth and managed to win over one of its sectors. Its appeal was reduced by Arriaga's attempt to build a broad anticommunist front extending from the extreme right to moderate social democracy. The organisation was threatened by other right-wing groups with expulsion from the 1 December (Restoration of Independence Day) demonstration in 1978 for allegedly seeking to hijack the nationalist mobilisation for its own ends. MIRN's vice-president Jorge Morais Barbosa left the movement around that time.

MIRN was registered as a political party on 7 March 1979, but did not contest the 1979 election. Ahead of the 1980 legislative election, MIRN was turned down as a coalition partner by the centre-right Democratic Alliance (AD). It then formed a separate coalition called the United Right (Direita Unida) with other groups rejected by the AD, the Christian Democratic Party (PDC) and the National Front movement, and renamed itself the Party of the Portuguese Right (PDP). The resulting alliance performed worse than when the Christian Democratic Party ran alone in the 1979 legislative election (23,819 votes in 1980 vs. 72,514 in 1979).

Diogo Pacheco de Amorim, member of the Parliament for Chega and the party's ideologist, was a member of MIRN, and joined the anticommunist terrorist group Democratic Movement for the Liberation of Portugal through MIRN.

PNR's leader José Pinto Coelho also belonged to MIRN and took part in its manifestations in 1980.

== Election results ==
=== Assembly of the Republic ===
Election	Assembly of the Republic			Government	Size
Election	Votes	%	Seats won	Government	Size
1980 PDC-MIRN-FN coalition	23,819	0.40%	0 / 250	No seats	9th
