= Guilherme d'Oliveira Martins =

Portuguese lawyer and politician (born 1952)

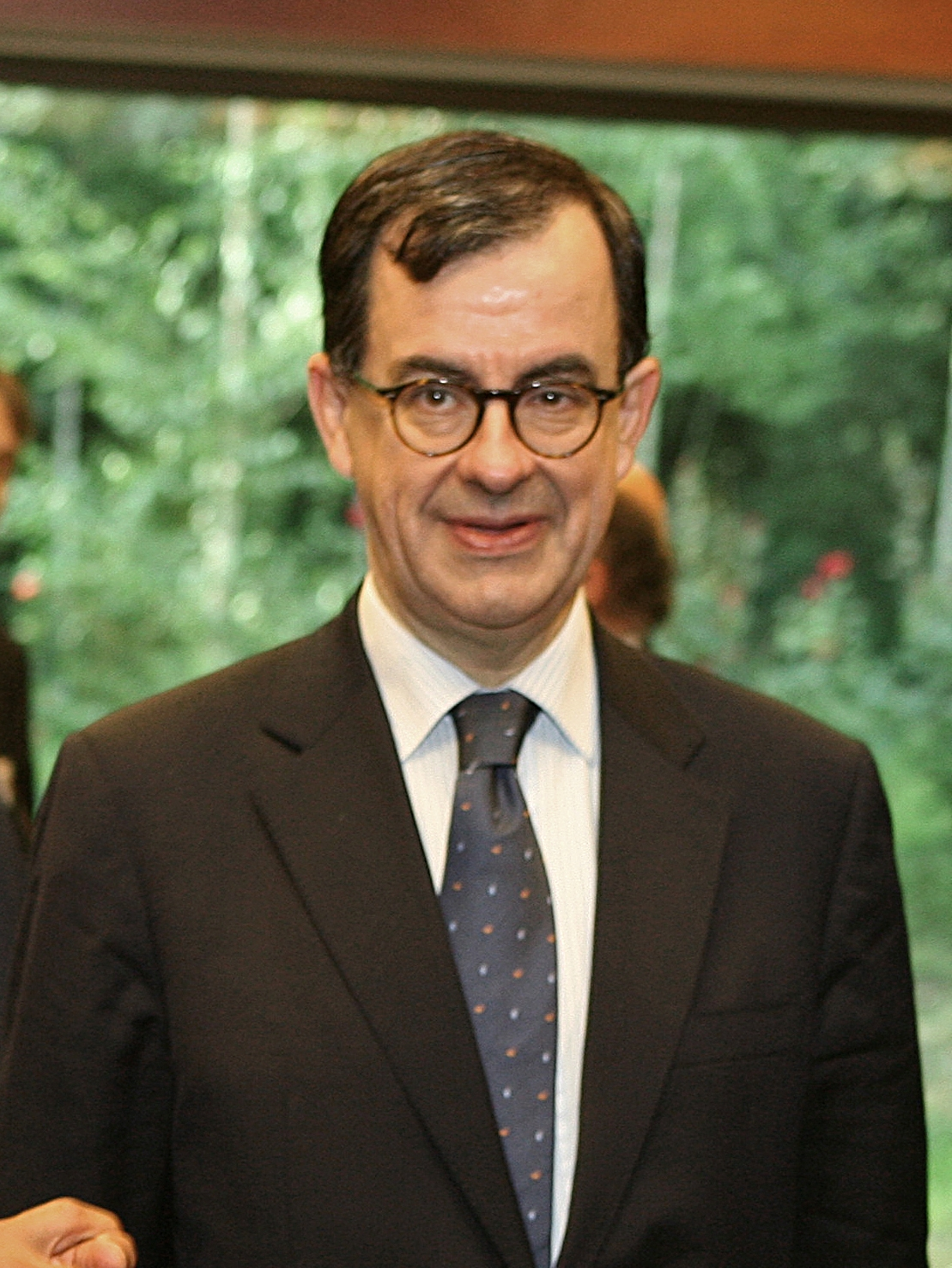
Guilherme d'Oliveira Martins

Guilherme Valdemar Pereira de Oliveira Martins (Lisbon, 23 September 1952) is a Portuguese lawyer and politician. His great-great-great uncle was Joaquim Pedro de Oliveira Martins.

== Biography ==
Martins graduated with a law degree and master's degree in Juridical Economic Science and was an assistant professor at the Law Faculty, University of Lisbon, from 1977–1985. He was Juridical Consultant of the Ministry of Finance and Industry and Commerce between 1975 and 1986 and Director of Juridical Services of the Directorate General of the Treasury. Between 1987 and 1995 he was also a professor at the International University.

He was a founder of the Social Democratic Youth in 1974, and deputy secretary general of the Popular Democratic Party in 1975. He abandoned that party in April 1979, in a division that gave rise to the Independent Social Democrats Action. In the same year, he was called to perform duties as chief of António Sousa Franco’s Office, who was the Finance Minister of Maria de Lourdes Pintasilgo. In 1980 and 1983, he took his seat as Member of Parliament, elected by the Socialist Party.

In 1985, he was involved in the first presidential candidacy of Mário Soares, as a member of the Policy Committee and spokesman of MASP I - Movement of Support to the Soares’ Presidency. With the Soares’ victory, he was appointed political advisor to the Civil House of the President of the Republic until 1991. With António Guterres as prime minister, he held the positions of Secretary of State for Educational Administration, from 1995 to 1999, Minister of Education until 2000, of Finance between 2001 and 2002 and of the Presidency, between 2000 and 2002.

Among other positions he performed, the following may be detached as the representative of Parliament to the Convention on the Future of Europe, secretary general of the Portuguese Committee of the European Cultural Foundation, SEATS president and member of the Board of Directors of Mário Soares’ Foundation. He is currently President of the Court of Auditors, of the Council for the Prevention of Corruption and of the National Centre for Culture. He is Visiting Professor at the Law Faculty of the Lusíada University of Lisbon and of the Institute of Social and Political Sciences of the Lisbon Technical University. On 5 March 1996, he was awarded the Grand Officer Medal of the Order of D. Henrique Infant. He was appointed Honorary Member in 2013 of MIL: International Lusophone Movement.

=== Major Published Works ===
- Lessons on Economic Portuguese Constitution (2 volumes)
- Oliveira Martins, one Biography
- School of Citizens (2 editions)
- The European Enigma
- Education or Barbarism?
- Ministry of Finance - Subsidies for its History in the State Secretary of Finance Bicentennial
- Portugal - Institutions and Facts (editions in English, French and Chinese)
- Audacity of Modern Country
- The 'children' of King Sebastian (1991)
- Oliveira Martins, one Battle of Ideas
- Essay on Economic Portuguese Constitution (with António de Sousa Franco)
- The New European Constitutional Treaty
- Portugal - Identity and Difference
- State Property, Heritage and Memory : Culture as creation. Collection Portuguese Tracks, no . 78, Gradiva, (April ) 2009

=== State Decorations ===
- Grand Officer of the Order of D. Henrique Infant (Portugal)
- Commander of the Order of Isabel the Catholic (Spain)
- Grand Cross of the Order of the Southern Cross (Brazil)
- Officer of the Order of the Legion of Honor (France)
