= Michael Seufert =

Portuguese politician

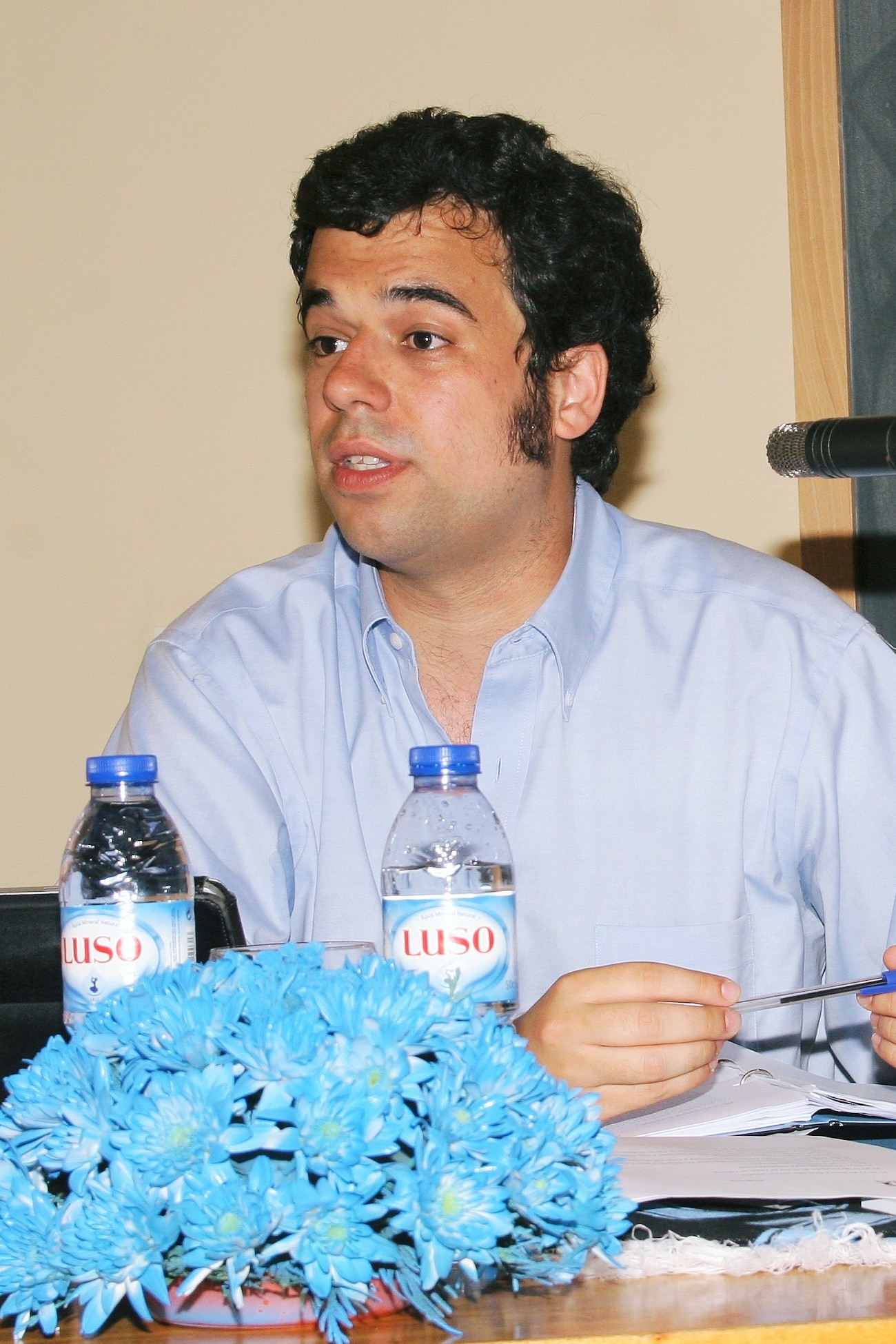
Michael Seufert

Michael Lothar Mendes Seufert (born 15 April 1983, in Porto) is a Portuguese politician and was a member of the Assembly of the Republic, representing the conservative CDS-PP (CDS - Partido Popular) political party. He is a self-assumed classical liberal and a proponent of free-market capitalism.
