= Diana Ferreira =

Portuguese psychologist and communist politician

Member of the Assembly of the Republic
- In office 29 August 2014 – 7 September 2022
- Constituency: Porto

Personal details
- Born: Diana Jorge Martins Ferreira; 17 March 1981 (age 45) Porto, Portugal
- Party: Portuguese Communist Party
- Education: University of Porto
- Occupation: Psychologist

Diana Jorge Martins Ferreira (born 17 March 1981) is a Portuguese psychologist and politician. A member of the Portuguese Communist Party (PCP), she was a deputy to the Assembly of the Republic of Portugal from August 2014 to September 2022, representing the Porto constituency.

== Early life ==
Diana Jorge Martins Ferreira was born in Porto on 17 March 1981 and lived in the Massarelos parish of that city. She obtained a degree in psychology from the Faculty of Psychology and Educational Sciences of the University of Porto, where she was on the board of the students' association for the faculty. She worked as a psychologist until August 2014.

== Political career ==
Ferreira joined the youth organization of the Portuguese Communist Party and became a member of the national directorate. In 2013 she was elected to be a member of the Municipal Assembly of Vila Nova de Gaia, the city immediately south of Porto on the left bank of the Douro river, as well as a member of the Parish Assembly of Gulpilhares e Valadares, which is in Vila Nova de Gaia. In September 2014 she became a deputy of the National Assembly as a substitute, being re-elected in 2015 and 2019, always for the Porto constituency. In 2019 she headed the list of candidates for Porto put forward by the Unitary Democratic Coalition (CDU), which is a coalition between (PCP), of which she is a member, and the Ecologist Party "The Greens". Still head of the list in the January 2022 elections, she was the only CDU representative to be elected in Porto in an election that proved disastrous for parties of the extreme left.

In the Assembly, Ferreira has served on the Culture, Communication, Youth and Sport Commission and the Labour and Social Security Commission, where she was vice-president, as well as on a Parliamentary Commission of Inquiry investigating the theft of military material from the Tancos military base.
