= 2025 Viseu local election =

Portuguese local election

2025 Viseu local elections
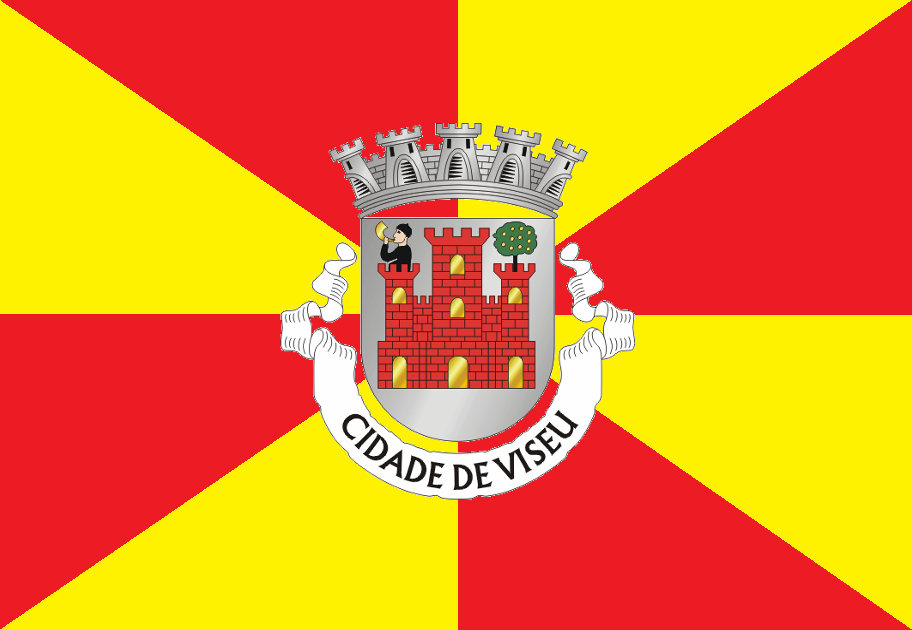
- 12 October 2025

All 9 Councillors in the Viseu City Council 5 seats needed for a majority
- Turnout: 61.6% ▲5.1 pp
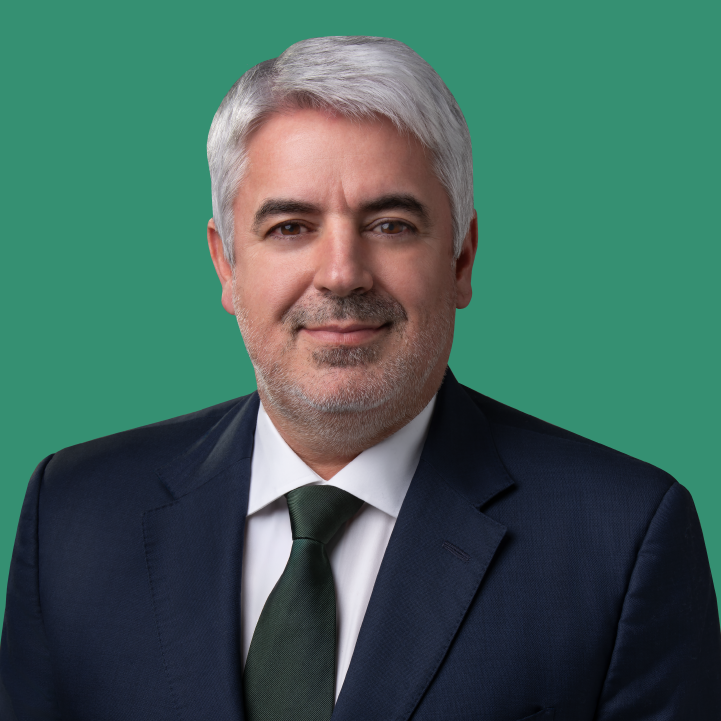

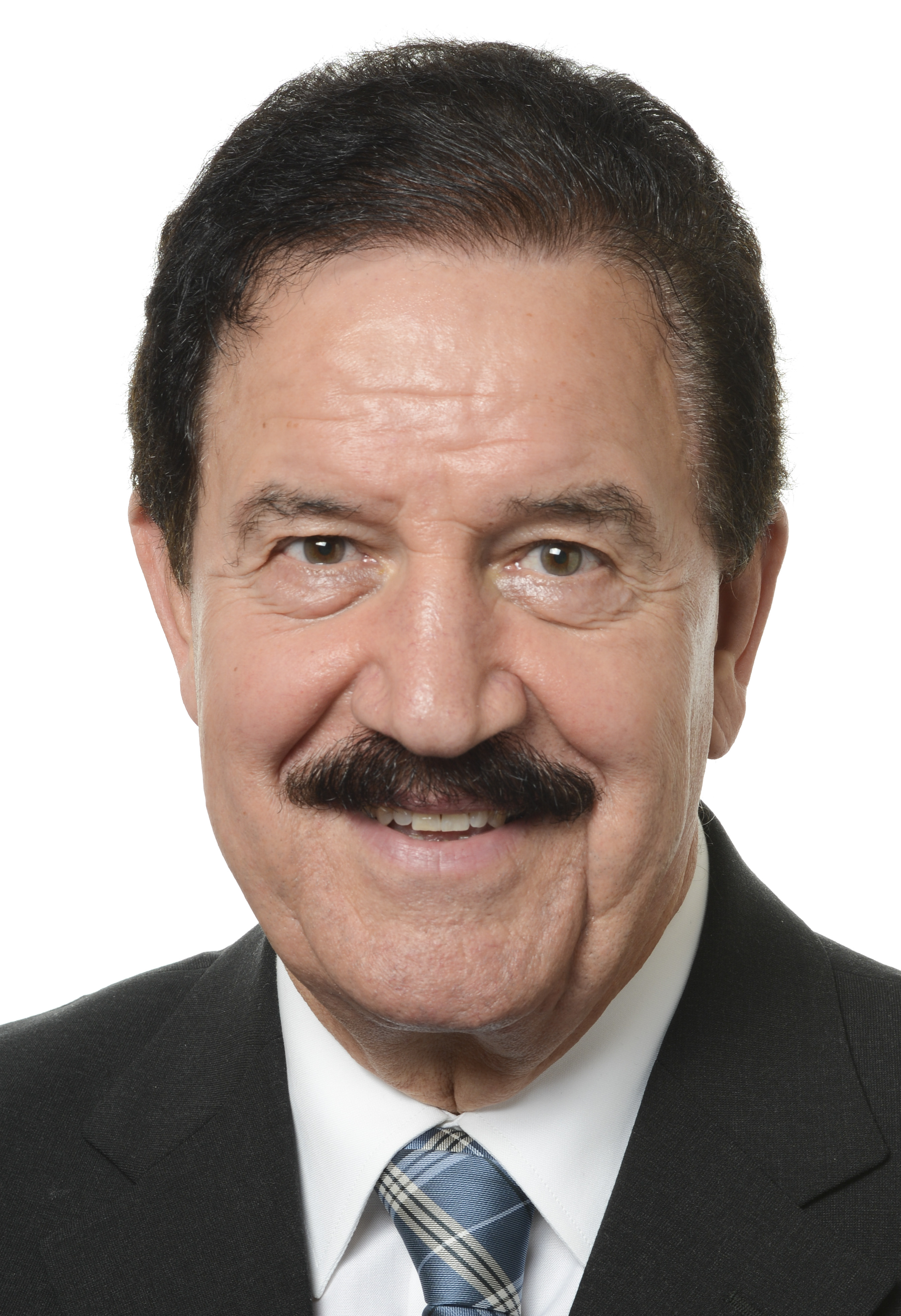

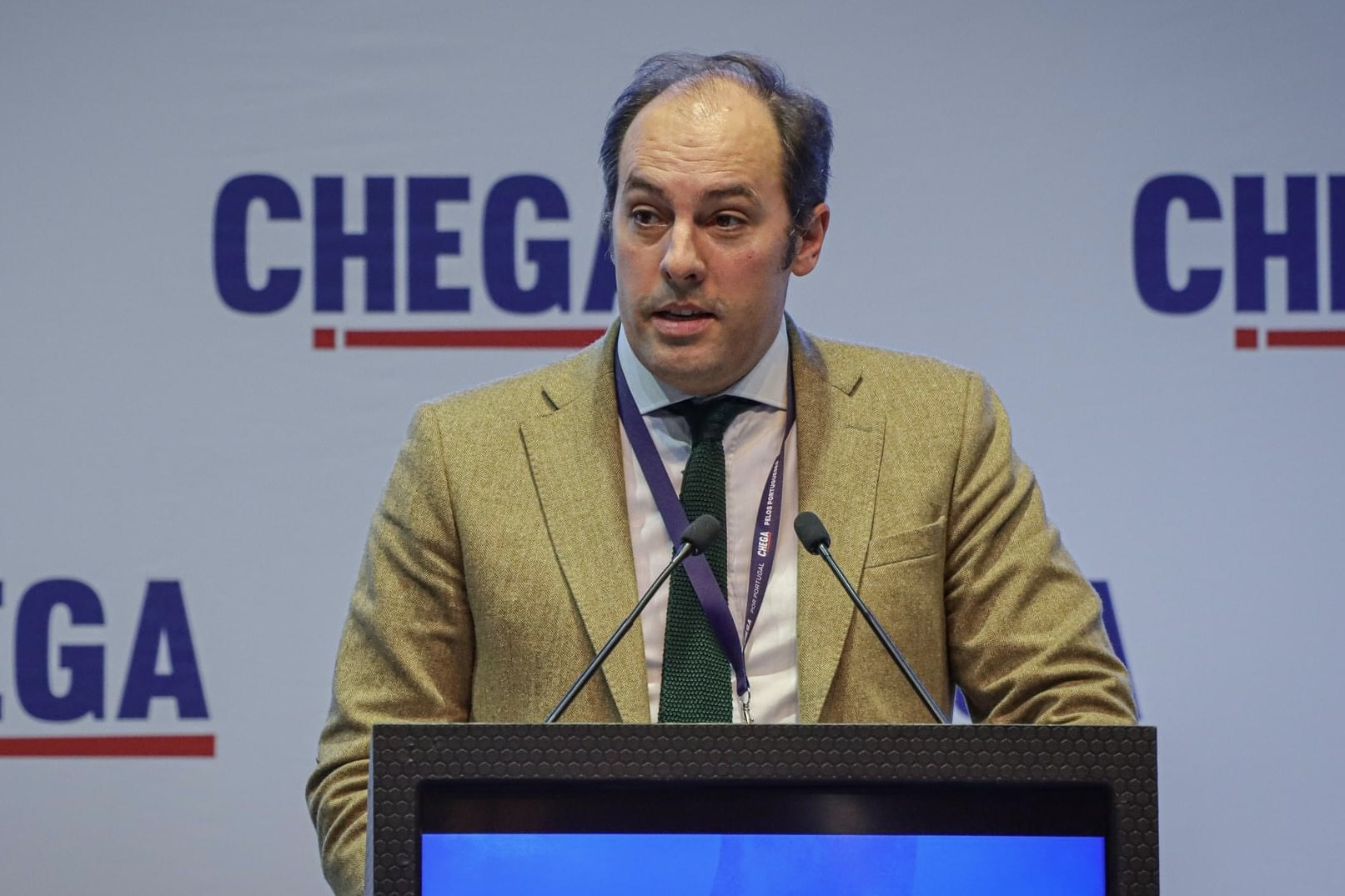
	First party	Second party	Third party
Leader	João Azevedo	Fernando Ruas	Bernardo Pessanha
Party	PS	PSD	CH
Last election	4 seats, 38.3%	5 seats, 46.7%	0 seats, 3.0%
Seats won	4	4	1
Seat change	0	▼1	▲1
Popular vote	24,095	23,292	4,886
Percentage	42.3%	40.9%	8.5%
Swing	▲4.0 pp	▼5.8 pp	▲5.6 pp
Mayor before election
Fernando Ruas
PSD
Elected mayor
João Azevedo
PS

The 2025 VIseu local election was held on 12 October 2025 to elect the members for Viseu City Council, Viseu Municipal Assembly and the city's 25 parish assemblies.

Incumbent Mayor Fernando Ruas, from the Social Democratic Party (PSD), ran for a second consecutive term. Former Mayor of Mangualde and former MP João Azevedo was chosen as the candidate of the Socialist Party (PS) again, after his defeat in 2021. Chega (CH) party chose the MP Bernardo Pessanha. The CDS – People's Party (CDS–PP), who once held the mayorship of the city, chose former MP and former member of the Viseu City Council, Hélder Amaral.

In a historic and upset result, the Socialist Party (PS) surpassed the PSD and won the most votes for Viseu city council, with João Azevedo becoming the first center-left mayor in Viseu's history. Incumbent mayor Fernando Ruas (PSD) failed to be elected to another term and defending the Social Democrats winning streak in the city since 1989. Chega elected a councillor, with 8.5% of the votes, and could become kingmaker in the council. Nearly 62% of all registered voters cast a ballot, the highest share since 2001.

== Background ==
In the 2021 election, the PSD held on to their majority with nearly 47% of the votes and elected 6 councillors, with former mayor Fernando Ruas, in office between 1990 and 2013, returning to the post. Ruas became the PSD mayoral candidate after the sudden death of then mayor António Almeida Henriques of COVID-19, in April 2021. The PS, led by João Azevedo, former mayor of Mangualde (2009–2019), achieved its best showing ever in Viseu with more than 38% of the votes and elected 5 councillors. The rest of parties, Chega, the Liberal Initiative, CDS – People's Party, the Left Bloc, People Animals Nature and the Unitary Democratic Coalition polled badly, all with results below 3%.

== Electoral system ==
Each party or coalition must present a list of candidates. The winner of the most voted list for the municipal council is automatically elected mayor, similar to first-past-the-post (FPTP). The lists are closed and the seats in each municipality are apportioned according to the D'Hondt method. Unlike in national legislative elections, independent lists are allowed to run.

== Parties and candidates ==
Party/Coalition		Political position	Candidate	2021 result		Ref.
Party/Coalition		Political position	Candidate	Votes (%)	Seats	Ref.
PSD	Social Democratic Party; Partido Social Democrata	Center-right	Fernando Ruas	46.7%	5 / 9	
PS	Socialist Party; Partido Socialista	Center-left	João Azevedo	38.3%	4 / 9	
CH	Enough! Chega!	Right-wing to far-right	Bernardo Pessanha	3.0%	0 / 9	
IL	Liberal Initiative; Iniciativa Liberal	Center-right to right-wing	Hélio Marta	2.2%	0 / 9	
CDS–PP	CDS – People's Party; CDS – Partido Popular	Right-wing	Hélder Amaral	2.0%	0 / 9	
CDU	Unitary Democratic Coalition; Coligação Democrática Unitária PCP, PEV	Left-wing to far-left	Leonel Ferreira	1.2%	0 / 9	
ADN	National Democratic Alternative; Alternativa Democrática Nacional	Far-right	Paulo Quintão	—N/a	—N/a	

== Campaign period ==
=== Party slogans ===
Party or alliance	Original slogan	English translation	Refs
PSD	« Viseu Cresce com Futuro. »	"Viseu Grows with a Future."	
PS	« Nova energia para Viseu. »	"New energy for Viseu."	
CH	« Mudar Viseu. »	« Change Viseu »	
IL	« Prontos para liberalizar Viseu. »	"Ready to liberalize Viseu."	
CDS–PP	« Viseu com mais ambição. »	"Viseu with more ambition."	
CDU	« Com a CDU, futuro de confiança no concelho de Viseu. »	"With CDU, future of trust in the municipality of Viseu."	

=== Candidates' debates ===
2025 Viseu local election debates
Date	Organisers	Moderator(s)	P Present (Note: Denotes a main invitee attending the event.) NI Not invited I Invited A Absent invitee						
Date	Organisers	Moderator(s)	PSD Ruas	PS Azevedo	CH Pessanha	IL Marta	CDS–PP Amaral	CDU Ferreira	Refs
20 Sep 2025	RTP3	António Esteves	P	P	P	P	P	P	

== Opinion polling ==
Polling firm/Link	Fieldwork date	Sample size	PSD	CDS	PS	CH	IL	BE	CDU	O	Lead
2025 local election	12 Oct 2025	—N/a	40.9; 4	2.0; 0	42.3; 4	8.5; 1	1.9; 0	—N/a	1.0; 0	3.4; 0	1.5
2025 Legislative election	18 May 2025	—N/a	40.7 (5)		21.5 (2)	22.3 (2)	4.5 (0)	1.5 (0)	1.1 (0)	8.4 (0)	18.4
2024 EP election	9 Jun 2024	—N/a	38.3 (4)		29.9 (3)	9.8 (1)	8.3 (1)	3.5 (0)	1.7 (0)	8.5 (0)	8.4
2024 Legislative election	10 Mar 2024	—N/a	35.6 (4)		25.7 (3)	19.7 (2)	4.0 (0)	3.4 (0)	1.2 (0)	10.4 (0)	8.4
2022 Legislative election	30 Jan 2022	—N/a	36.6 (4)	1.9 (0)	39.2 (4)	8.2 (1)	3.8 (0)	3.6 (0)	1.6 (0)	5.1 (0)	2.6
2021 local election	26 Sep 2021	—N/a	46.7; 5	2.0; 0	38.3; 4	3.0; 0	2.2; 0	2.0; 0	1.2; 0	4.6	8.4

== Results ==
=== Municipal Council ===
Summary of the 12 October 2025 Viseu City Council elections results
Graph of the party split among 9 seats.
Parties	Votes	%	±pp swing	Councillors	
Parties	Votes	%	±pp swing	Total	±
Socialist	24,095	42.27	▲4.0	4	0
Social Democratic	23,292	40.86	▼5.8	4	▼1
Chega	4,886	8.57	▲5.7	1	▲1
People's	1,119	1.96	▼0.1	0	0
Liberal Initiative	1,116	1.96	▼0.2	0	0
Unitary Democratic Coalition	545	0.96	▼0.2	0	0
National Democratic Alternative	165	0.29	—N/a	0	—N/a
Total valid	55,218	96.88	▲0.3	9	0
Blank ballots	1,136	1.99	▼0.2		
Invalid ballots	644	1.13	▼0.1		
Total	56,998	100.00			
Registered voters/turnout	92,583	61.56	▲5.1		

=== Municipal Assembly ===
Summary of the 12 October 2025 Viseu Municipal Assembly elections results
Graph of the party split among 27 seats.
Parties	Votes	%	±pp swing	Seats	
Parties	Votes	%	±pp swing	Total	±
Social Democratic	22,324	39.17	▼5.1	12	▼2
Socialist	21,753	38.16	▲2.3	12	▲1
Chega	6,161	10.81	▲6.9	3	▲2
Liberal Initiative	1,552	2.72	▲0.0	0	0
People's	1,294	2.27	▼0.0	0	0
Left Bloc	1,073	1.88	▼1.3	0	▼1
Unitary Democratic Coalition	709	1.24	▼0.6	0	0
National Democratic Alternative	197	0.35	—N/a	0	—N/a
Total valid	55,063	96.60	▲0.6	27	0
Blank ballots	1,263	2.22	▼0.4		
Invalid ballots	673	1.18	▼0.2		
Total	56,999	100.00			
Registered voters/turnout	92,583	61.57	▲5.1		

=== Parish Assemblies ===
Results of the 12 October 2025 Viseu Parish Assembly elections
Parish	%	S	%	S	%	S	%	S	%	S	%	S	Total S
Parish	PSD		PS		CH		IND		MPT		IL		Total S
Abraveses	38.7	6	36.5	5	11.3	1					6.2	1	13
Barreiros e Cepões	16.9	1	19.8	2					59.0	6			9
Boa Aldeia, Farminhão e Torredeita	60.9	6	35.5	3									9
Bodiosa	51.0	5	38.4	4	8.5	-							9
Calde	55.5	5	41.0	4									9
Campo	32.0	3	18.1	2	5.2	-	26.0	3			10.7	1	9
Cavernães	69.9	7	25.4	2									9
Cota	65.0	6	31.1	3									9
Coutos de Viseu	64.9	6	30.2	3									9
Fail e Vila Chã de Sá	49.2	5	37.4	3	9.8	1							9
Fragosela	30.8	3	31.1	3			35.4	3					9
Lordosa	33.4	3	63.0	6									9
Mundão	45.1	4	29.0	3	21.0	2							9
Orgens	61.0	6	33.3	3									9
Povolide	51.7	5	44.9	4									9
Ranhados	40.3	4	39.6	4	8.7	1					5.7	-	9
Repeses e São Salvador	34.6	5	52.3	7	7.1	1							13
Ribafeita	52.9	5	44.2	4									9
Rio de Loba	29.2	4	49.4	7	7.1	1	9.8	1					13
Santos Evos	57.6	6	36.4	3	3.6	-							9
São Cipriano e Vil de Souto	65.4	7	21.8	2	7.9	-							9
São João de Lourosa	42.4	4	49.3	5									9
São João de France	51.7	5	44.5	4									9
Silgueiros	40.5	4	18.2	2	13.8	1	25.3	2					9
Viseu	37.8	8	38.4	9	8.6	2					3.6	-	19
Total	41.9	123	37.9	97	6.4	10	4.2	9	1.0	6	2.1	2	247

== Aftermath ==
João Azevedo was sworn in as the first left-wing mayor of Viseu, under a minority, on 31 October 2025. However, this minority capacity only lasted a few days as, despite winning the same number of councillors as the PSD, João Azevedo was able to "gain" an absolute majority after managing to get one of the councillors elected by the PSD, Pedro Ribeiro, to be part of his local government.
