= Gonçalo Lopes =

Portuguese politician

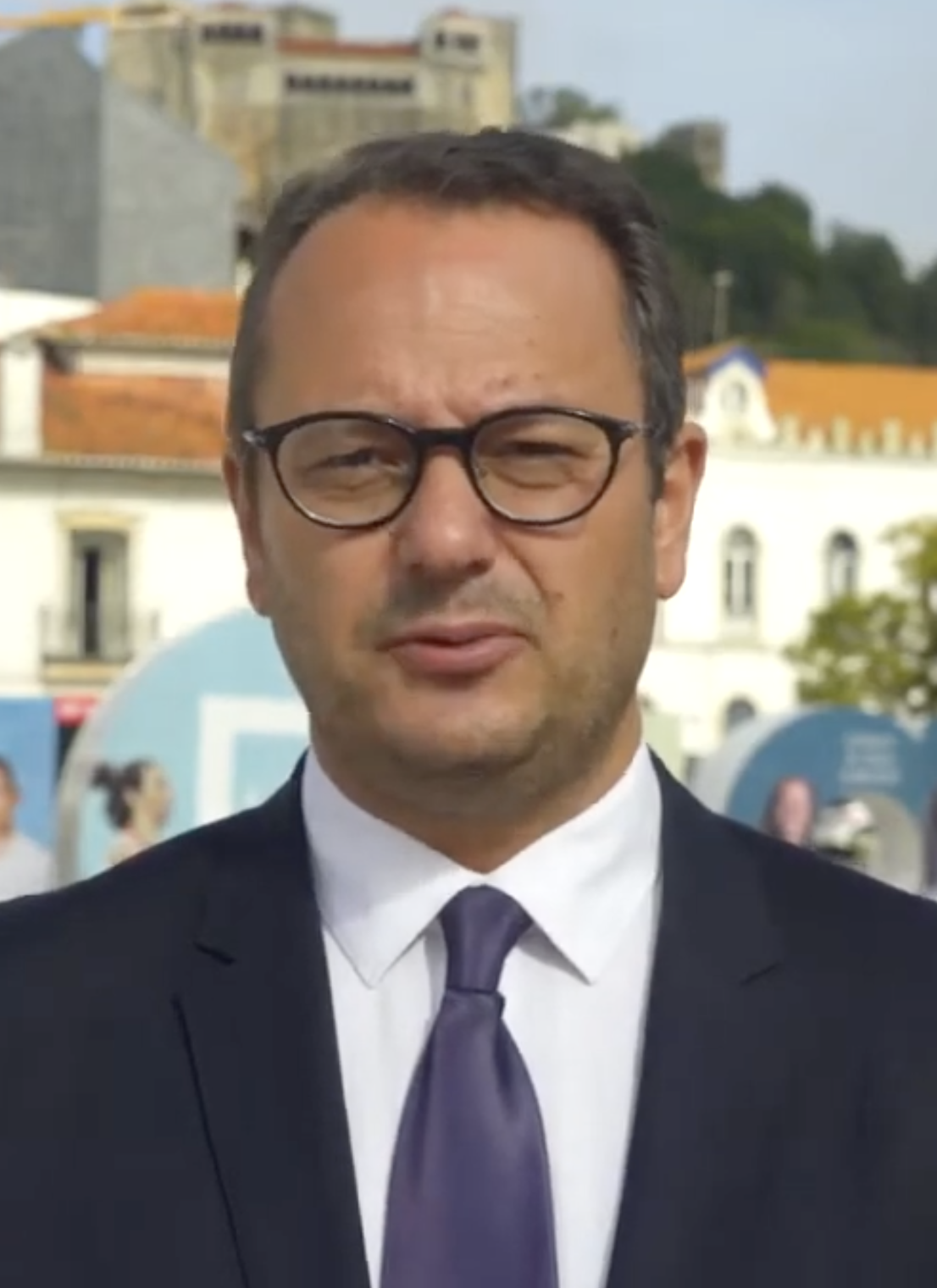
- Gonçalo Lopes in 2021

Mayor of Leiria
- Incumbent
- Assumed office 26 August 2019
- Preceded by: Raul Miguel de Castro

Personal details
- Born: Gonçalo Nuno Bértolo Gordalina Lopes; 23 November 1975 (age 50)
- Party: Socialist Party
- Occupation: Politician

Gonçalo Nuno Bértolo Gordalina Lopes (born 23 November 1975) is a Portuguese politician and economist who has been serving as Mayor of Leiria since 2019.

He was first elected as Deputy Mayor of Leiria in the 2009 local election. After incumbent Mayor Raul Castro was chosen to be the main candidate in the Socialist Party's list in Leiria for the 2019 legislative elections, he became the Mayor.

In the 2021 local election, Gonçalo Lopes was elected for a first full term, with 52.5% of the votes.

In 2023, he was the campaign chair for Pedro Nuno Santos' campaign for the PS leadership. In 2024, he was elected as the Chair of the Leiria Federation of the Socialist Party, with 58.5% of the votes.

He won reelection for a second term in 2025, winning 54.1% of the votes and defeating the Social Democratic MP Sofia Carreira.

After the impact of Storm Kristin, he led the efforts to overcome the damages caused by the storm.

== Election history ==
=== Marrazes Parish Assembly election, 2005 ===
Ballot: 9 October 2005
Party	Candidate	Votes	%	Seats	+/−
PSD	Sofia Carreira	3,001	38.7	6	±0
PS	Gonçalo Lopes	2,657	34.2	5	+2
CDU	António Silva Santos	616	7.9	1	±0
CDS–PP	Susana Maria Carvalho	465	6.0	1	±0
BE	–	447	5.8	0	±0
Blank/Invalid ballots		573	7.4	–	–
Turnout		7,759	51.84	13	±0
Source: Autárquicas 2005

=== Leiria City Council election, 2021 ===
Ballot: 26 September 2021
Party	Candidate	Votes	%	Seats	+/−
PS	Gonçalo Lopes	31,658	52.5	8	±0
PSD	Álvaro Madureira	13,502	22.4	3	±0
CH	Luís Paulo Fernandes	3,424	5.7	0	new
CDS–PP/MPT	Fábio Seguro Joaquim	1,366	4.2	0	±0
CDU	Sérgio Silva	1,525	2.5	0	±0
BE	Luís Miguel Silva	1,455	2.4	0	±0
IL	Marcos Ramos	1,440	2.4	0	new
PAN	Pedro Machado	1,103	1.8	0	±0
LIVRE	Filipe Honório	401	0.7	0	new
Blank/Invalid ballots		3,275	5.4	–	–
Turnout		60,338	53.20	11	±0
Source: Autárquicas 2021

=== Leiria City Council election, 2025 ===
Ballot: 12 October 2025
Party	Candidate	Votes	%	Seats	+/−
PS	Gonçalo Lopes	37,069	54.1	7	–1
PSD	Sofia Carreira	14,963	21.8	3	±0
CH	Luís Paulo Fernandes	7,897	11.5	1	+1
IL	Paulo Ventura	2,551	3.7	0	±0
CDS–PP	Branca Matos	1,366	2.0	0	±0
BE/L/PAN	José Peixoto	1,036	1.5	0	±0
CDU	Nuno Violante	995	1.5	0	±0
ADN	Nuno Barroso	336	0.5	0	new
Blank/Invalid ballots		2,291	3.4	–	–
Turnout		68,504	59.96	11	±0
Source: Autárquicas 2025
