= Sofia Carreira =

Portuguese politician (born 1974)

Member of the Assembly of the Republic
- Incumbent
- Assumed office 26 March 2024
- Constituency: Leiria

Personal details
- Born: Sofia Isabel Carreira; 20 June 1974 (age 52) Portugal
- Party: Social Democratic Party
- Occupation: Politician • Museum curator

Sofia Isabel Carreira (born 1974) is a Portuguese politician and museum curator. A member of the Social Democratic Party (PSD), she was elected to the Assembly of the Republic of Portugal in March 2024 to represent the Leiria constituency.

== Early life and education ==
Carreira was born on 20 June 1974. Between 1994 and 1998 she attended the Lusiáda University of Lisbon and the NOVA University Lisbon, studying museology, heritage and history. She then worked as a curator for the municipality of Marinha Grande in 1998 and 1999 and for the municipality of Leiria at the Museu da Imagem em Movimento (Museum of Images and Movement) between 1999 and 2004 and from 2009.

== Political career ==
Between 2004 and 2009, she served as president of the parish of Marrazes in the Leiria municipality.

The March 2024 national election was called following the resignation of the Socialist prime minister, António Costa, after allegations of corruption had been made against members of his government. To fight the election the PSD formed a coalition with two smaller parties, called the Democratic Alliance (AD). Having been an active member of the PSD for 20 years, Carreira was chosen as the third-placed candidate on the AD's list of candidates in the Leiria constituency and was elected when the AD won five of the available ten seats. In the parliament, she became a member of the Committee on Culture, Communication, Youth and Sport. In the May 2025 election, called following a vote of no confidence in the government, she was again third on the AD's list for Leiria and was re-elected when the AD again won five of the available ten seats.

== Electoral history ==
=== Marrazes Parish Assembly election, 2005 ===
Ballot: 9 October 2005
Party	Candidate	Votes	%	Seats	+/−
PSD	Sofia Carreira	3,001	38.7	6	±0
PS	Gonçalo Lopes	2,657	34.2	5	+2
CDU	António Silva Santos	616	7.9	1	±0
CDS–PP	Susana Maria Carvalho	465	6.0	1	±0
BE	–	447	5.8	0	±0
Blank/Invalid ballots		573	7.4	–	–
Turnout		7,759	51.84	13	±0
Source: Autárquicas 2005

=== Marrazes Parish Assembly election, 2009 ===
Ballot: 11 October 2009
Party	Candidate	Votes	%	Seats	+/−
PS	Isabel Afonso	3,356	39.4	6	+1
PSD	Sofia Carreira	3,053	35.9	5	–1
CDS–PP	Susana Maria Carvalho	684	8.0	1	±0
CDU	António Silva Santos	559	6.6	1	±0
BE	–	456	5.4	0	±0
Blank/Invalid ballots		403	4.7	–	–
Turnout		8,511	50.80	13	±0
Source: Autárquicas 2009

=== Leiria City Council election, 2025 ===
Ballot: 12 October 2025
Party	Candidate	Votes	%	Seats	+/−
PS	Gonçalo Lopes	37,069	54.1	7	–1
PSD	Sofia Carreira	14,963	21.8	3	±0
CH	Luís Paulo Fernandes	7,897	11.5	1	+1
IL	Paulo Ventura	2,551	3.7	0	±0
CDS–PP	Branca Matos	1,366	2.0	0	±0
BE/L/PAN	José Peixoto	1,036	1.5	0	±0
CDU	Nuno Violante	995	1.5	0	±0
ADN	Nuno Barroso	336	0.5	0	new
Blank/Invalid ballots		2,291	3.4	–	–
Turnout		68,504	59.96	11	±0
Source: Autárquicas 2025
