= Viseu (Assembly of the Republic constituency) =

Constituency of the Assembly of the Republic, the national legislature of Portugal

- Constituency for the Assembly of the Republic
- Location of Viseu within Portugal
- District: Viseu
- Population: 357,841 (2024)
- Electorate: 334,039 (2025)
- Area: 5,010 km^{2} (2024)

Current Constituency
- Created: 1976
- Seats: List: 8 (2019–present); 9 (1991–2019); 10 (1979–1991); 11 (1976–1979)
- Deputies: List: Pedro Alves (PSD); Bruno Faria (PSD); Isabel Fernandes (PSD); Armando Mourisco (PS); Elza Pais (PS); Bernardo Pessanha (CH); Carlos Silva Santiago (PSD); João Tilly (CH)

Viseu is one of the 22 multi-member constituencies of the Assembly of the Republic, the national legislature of Portugal. The constituency was established in 1976 when the Assembly of the Republic was established by the constitution following the restoration of democracy. It is conterminous with the district of Viseu. The constituency currently elects eight of the 230 members of the Assembly of the Republic using the closed party-list proportional representation electoral system. At the 2025 legislative election it had 334,039 registered electors.

== Electoral system ==
Viseu currently elects eight of the 230 members of the Assembly of the Republic using the closed party-list proportional representation electoral system. Seats are allocated using the D'Hondt method.

== Election results ==
=== Summary ===
Election	Unitary Democrats CDU / APU / PCP			Left Bloc BE / UDP			LIVRE L			Socialists PS / FRS			People Animals Nature PAN			Democratic Renewal PRD			Social Democrats PSD / PàF / AD / PPD			Liberals IL			CDS – People's CDS–PP / CDS			Chega CH / PPV/CDC / PPV		
Election	Votes	%	Seats	Votes	%	Seats	Votes	%	Seats	Votes	%	Seats	Votes	%	Seats	Votes	%	Seats	Votes	%	Seats	Votes	%	Seats	Votes	%	Seats	Votes	%	Seats
2025	2,491	1.24%	0	2,465	1.23%	0	4,395	2.18%	0	45,219	22.47%	2	0	0.00%	0				88,385	43.93%	4	6,468	3.21%	0				45,801	22.76%	2
2024	2,905	1.41%	0	5,846	2.84%	0	3,567	1.73%	0	58,088	28.24%	3	2,555	1.24%	0				76,938	37.40%	3	5,950	2.89%	0				41,165	20.01%	2
2022	2,982	1.65%	0	5,218	2.89%	0	1,179	0.65%	0	76,645	42.48%	4	1,671	0.93%	0				67,889	37.63%	4	4,668	2.59%	0	3,789	2.10%	0	14,383	7.97%	0
2019	4,082	2.42%	0	13,957	8.26%	0	873	0.52%	0	62,834	37.19%	4	3,778	2.24%	0				64,376	38.10%	4	974	0.58%	0	10,459	6.19%	0	1,724	1.02%	0
2015	6,672	3.65%	0	12,822	7.01%	0	1,003	0.55%	0	56,553	30.92%	3	1,297	0.71%	0				97,381	53.25%	6							0	0.00%	0
2011	5,810	2.99%	0	5,786	2.97%	0				54,107	27.81%	3	1,229	0.63%	0				98,097	50.42%	5				25,087	12.90%	1	0	0.00%	0
2009	6,146	2.95%	0	13,971	6.71%	0				74,754	35.90%	4							80,706	38.76%	4				28,925	13.89%	1	350	0.17%	0
2005	4,792	2.32%	0	7,149	3.45%	0				86,497	41.80%	4							86,002	41.56%	4				18,477	8.93%	1			
2002	3,202	1.55%	0	3,049	1.47%	0				65,673	31.76%	3							110,035	53.21%	5				22,374	10.82%	1			
1999	4,479	2.24%	0	2,400	1.20%	0				77,726	38.95%	4							90,305	45.25%	4				21,300	10.67%	1			
1995	3,887	1.83%	0	795	0.37%	0				83,325	39.22%	4							96,145	45.26%	4				24,904	11.72%	1			
1991	4,499	2.10%	0							48,289	22.56%	2				843	0.39%	0	140,582	65.69%	7				13,697	6.40%	0			
1987	6,507	2.94%	0	777	0.35%	0				40,762	18.44%	2				3,932	1.78%	0	145,654	65.90%	8				15,852	7.17%	0			
1985	11,180	5.18%	0	1,439	0.67%	0				44,476	20.59%	2				24,163	11.19%	1	83,913	38.85%	5				44,257	20.49%	2			
1983	10,163	4.73%	0	1,105	0.51%	0				68,835	32.04%	4							81,494	37.94%	4				46,015	21.42%	2			
1980	11,936	5.15%	0	1,536	0.66%	0				50,272	21.68%	2							160,593	69.25%	8									
1979	13,464	5.72%	0	3,373	1.43%	0				52,183	22.18%	2							156,445	66.50%	8									
1976	4,954	2.42%	0	2,026	0.99%	0				50,033	24.46%	3							70,159	34.30%	4				67,864	33.18%	4			

(Figures in italics represent alliances.)

=== Detailed ===
==== 2020s ====
===== 2025 =====
Results of the 2025 legislative election held on 18 May 2025:

Party		Votes	%	Seats
Democratic Alliance	AD	88,385	43.93%	4
Chega	CH	45,801	22.76%	2
Socialist Party	PS	45,219	22.47%	2
Liberal Initiative	IL	6,468	3.21%	0
LIVRE	L	4,395	2.18%	0
National Democratic Alternative	ADN	4,190	2.08%	0
Unitary Democratic Coalition	CDU	2,491	1.24%	0
Left Bloc	BE	2,465	1.23%	0
React, Include, Recycle	RIR	548	0.27%	0
New Right	ND	432	0.21%	0
People's Monarchist Party	PPM	344	0.17%	0
Volt Portugal	Volt	246	0.12%	0
Ergue-te	E	228	0.11%	0
Valid votes		201,212	100.00%	8
Blank votes		3,320	1.61%	
Rejected votes – other		2,284	1.10%	
Total polled		206,816	61.91%	
Registered electors		334,039		

The following candidates were elected:: Pedro Alves (AD); António Leitão Amaro (AD); Inês Domingos (AD); Armando Mourisco (PS); Elza Pais (PS); Bernardo Pessanha (CH); Carlos Silva Santiago (AD); and João Tilly (CH).

===== 2024 =====
Results of the 2024 legislative election held on 10 March 2024:

Party		Votes	%	Seats
Democratic Alliance	AD	76,938	37.40%	3
Socialist Party	PS	58,088	28.24%	3
Chega	CH	41,165	20.01%	2
National Democratic Alternative	ADN	6,617	3.22%	0
Liberal Initiative	IL	5,950	2.89%	0
Left Bloc	BE	5,846	2.84%	0
LIVRE	L	3,567	1.73%	0
Unitary Democratic Coalition	CDU	2,905	1.41%	0
People Animals Nature	PAN	2,555	1.24%	0
React, Include, Recycle	RIR	832	0.40%	0
New Right	ND	544	0.26%	0
Volt Portugal	Volt	342	0.17%	0
Alternative 21 (Earth Party and Alliance)	PT-A	180	0.09%	0
Ergue-te	E	164	0.08%	0
Valid votes		205,693	100.00%	8
Blank votes		3,302	1.56%	
Rejected votes – other		2,595	1.23%	
Total polled		211,590	63.04%	
Registered electors		335,659		

The following candidates were elected: Pedro Alves (AD); António Leitão Amaro (AD); João Azevedo (PS); José Rui Cruz (PS); Inês Domingos (AD); Elza Pais (PS); Bernardo Pessanha (CH); and João Tilly (CH).

===== 2022 =====
Results of the 2022 legislative election held on 30 January 2022:

Party		Votes	%	Seats
Socialist Party	PS	76,645	42.48%	4
Social Democratic Party	PSD	67,889	37.63%	4
Chega	CH	14,383	7.97%	0
Left Bloc	BE	5,218	2.89%	0
Liberal Initiative	IL	4,668	2.59%	0
CDS – People's Party	CDS–PP	3,789	2.10%	0
Unitary Democratic Coalition	CDU	2,982	1.65%	0
People Animals Nature	PAN	1,671	0.93%	0
LIVRE	L	1,179	0.65%	0
React, Include, Recycle	RIR	682	0.38%	0
Volt Portugal	Volt	289	0.16%	0
We, the Citizens!	NC	229	0.13%	0
National Democratic Alternative	ADN	188	0.10%	0
Ergue-te	E	176	0.10%	0
Earth Party	PT	156	0.09%	0
Socialist Alternative Movement	MAS	145	0.08%	0
Portuguese Labour Party	PTP	129	0.07%	0
Valid votes		180,418	100.00%	8
Blank votes		2,143	1.16%	
Rejected votes – other		1,898	1.03%	
Total polled		184,459	54.20%	
Registered electors		340,342		

The following candidates were elected: Guilherme Almeida (PSD); João Azevedo (PS); Hugo Martins de Carvalho (PSD); José Rui Cruz (PS); Cristiana Ferreira (PSD); Hugo Maravilha (PSD); João Paulo Rebelo (PS); and Lúcia Araújo Silva (PS).

==== 2010s ====
===== 2019 =====
Results of the 2019 legislative election held on 6 October 2019:

Party		Votes	%	Seats
Social Democratic Party	PSD	64,376	38.10%	4
Socialist Party	PS	62,834	37.19%	4
Left Bloc	BE	13,957	8.26%	0
CDS – People's Party	CDS–PP	10,459	6.19%	0
Unitary Democratic Coalition	CDU	4,082	2.42%	0
People Animals Nature	PAN	3,778	2.24%	0
Chega	CH	1,724	1.02%	0
React, Include, Recycle	RIR	1,336	0.79%	0
Alliance	A	1,215	0.72%	0
Liberal Initiative	IL	974	0.58%	0
Portuguese Workers' Communist Party	PCTP	900	0.53%	0
LIVRE	L	873	0.52%	0
Democratic Republican Party	PDR	457	0.27%	0
United Party of Retirees and Pensioners	PURP	363	0.21%	0
People's Monarchist Party	PPM	357	0.21%	0
We, the Citizens!	NC	332	0.20%	0
National Renewal Party	PNR	326	0.19%	0
Earth Party	PT	256	0.15%	0
Portuguese Labour Party	PTP	239	0.14%	0
Together for the People	JPP	118	0.07%	0
Valid votes		168,956	100.00%	8
Blank votes		4,995	2.81%	
Rejected votes – other		3,693	2.08%	
Total polled		177,644	51.04%	
Registered electors		348,061		

The following candidates were elected: Pedro Alves (PSD); João Azevedo (PS); Carla Borges (PSD); António Lima Costa (PSD); José Rui Cruz (PS); João Paulo Rebelo (PS); Fernando Ruas (PSD); and Lúcia Araújo Silva (PS).

===== 2015 =====
Results of the 2015 legislative election held on 4 October 2015:

Party		Votes	%	Seats
Portugal Ahead	PàF	97,381	53.25%	6
Socialist Party	PS	56,553	30.92%	3
Left Bloc	BE	12,822	7.01%	0
Unitary Democratic Coalition	CDU	6,672	3.65%	0
Democratic Republican Party	PDR	1,953	1.07%	0
Portuguese Workers' Communist Party	PCTP	1,744	0.95%	0
People Animals Nature	PAN	1,297	0.71%	0
LIVRE	L	1,003	0.55%	0
ACT! (Portuguese Labour Party and Socialist Alternative Movement)	AGIR	722	0.39%	0
The Earth Party Movement	MPT	679	0.37%	0
National Renewal Party	PNR	608	0.33%	0
We, the Citizens!	NC	535	0.29%	0
People's Monarchist Party	PPM	533	0.29%	0
United Party of Retirees and Pensioners	PURP	387	0.21%	0
Valid votes		182,889	100.00%	9
Blank votes		4,235	2.22%	
Rejected votes – other		3,590	1.88%	
Total polled		190,714	51.28%	
Registered electors		371,931		

The following candidates were elected: Pedro Alves (PàF); Hélder Amaral (PàF); António Leitão Amaro (PàF); António Borges (PS); António Lima Costa (PàF); Inês Domingos (PàF); Maria Manuel Leitão Marques (PS); Isaura Pedro (PàF); and João Paulo Rebelo (PS).

===== 2011 =====
Results of the 2011 legislative election held on 5 June 2011:

Party		Votes	%	Seats
Social Democratic Party	PSD	98,097	50.42%	5
Socialist Party	PS	54,107	27.81%	3
CDS – People's Party	CDS–PP	25,087	12.90%	1
Unitary Democratic Coalition	CDU	5,810	2.99%	0
Left Bloc	BE	5,786	2.97%	0
Portuguese Workers' Communist Party	PCTP	1,456	0.75%	0
Party for Animals and Nature	PAN	1,229	0.63%	0
The Earth Party Movement	MPT	696	0.36%	0
People's Monarchist Party	PPM	626	0.32%	0
Hope for Portugal Movement	MEP	623	0.32%	0
Portuguese Labour Party	PTP	465	0.24%	0
Democratic Party of the Atlantic	PDA	295	0.15%	0
National Renewal Party	PNR	266	0.14%	0
Valid votes		194,543	100.00%	9
Blank votes		5,187	2.56%	
Rejected votes – other		3,010	1.48%	
Total polled		202,740	53.47%	
Registered electors		379,141		

The following candidates were elected: Pedro Alves (PSD); Hélder Amaral (CDS-PP); João Figueiredo (PSD); António Almeida Henriques (PSD); José Junqueiro (PS); Elza Pais (PS); Acácio Pinto (PS); Arménio Santos (PSD); and Teresa Costa Santos (PSD).

==== 2000s ====
===== 2009 =====
Results of the 2009 legislative election held on 27 September 2009:

Party		Votes	%	Seats
Social Democratic Party	PSD	80,706	38.76%	4
Socialist Party	PS	74,754	35.90%	4
CDS – People's Party	CDS–PP	28,925	13.89%	1
Left Bloc	BE	13,971	6.71%	0
Unitary Democratic Coalition	CDU	6,146	2.95%	0
Portuguese Workers' Communist Party	PCTP	1,300	0.62%	0
New Democracy Party	ND	512	0.25%	0
Hope for Portugal Movement	MEP	502	0.24%	0
Merit and Society Movement	MMS	382	0.18%	0
National Renewal Party	PNR	375	0.18%	0
Pro-Life Party	PPV	350	0.17%	0
The Earth Party Movement and Humanist Party	MPT-PH	305	0.15%	0
Valid votes		208,228	100.00%	9
Blank votes		3,395	1.58%	
Rejected votes – other		3,704	1.72%	
Total polled		215,327	56.44%	
Registered electors		381,538		

The following candidates were elected: Hélder Amaral (CDS-PP); José Luís Arnaut (PSD); José Rui Cruz (PS); João Figueiredo (PSD); António Almeida Henriques (PSD); José Junqueiro (PS); Elza Pais (PS); Acácio Pinto (PS); and Teresa Costa Santos (PSD).

===== 2005 =====
Results of the 2005 legislative election held on 20 February 2005:

Party		Votes	%	Seats
Socialist Party	PS	86,497	41.80%	4
Social Democratic Party	PSD	86,002	41.56%	4
CDS – People's Party	CDS–PP	18,477	8.93%	1
Left Bloc	BE	7,149	3.45%	0
Unitary Democratic Coalition	CDU	4,792	2.32%	0
New Democracy Party	ND	1,537	0.74%	0
Portuguese Workers' Communist Party	PCTP	1,038	0.50%	0
Humanist Party	PH	996	0.48%	0
National Renewal Party	PNR	434	0.21%	0
Valid votes		206,922	100.00%	9
Blank votes		4,220	1.97%	
Rejected votes – other		2,894	1.35%	
Total polled		214,036	60.09%	
Registered electors		356,214		

The following candidates were elected: José Luís Arnaut (PSD); Manuel Maria Carrilho (PS); Miguel Anacoreta Correia (CDS-PP); Miguel Ginestal (PS); António Almeida Henriques (PSD); José Junqueiro (PS); Carlos Andrade Miranda (PSD); Melchior Moreira (PSD); and Cláudia Couto Vieira (PS).

===== 2002 =====
Results of the 2002 legislative election held on 17 March 2002:

Party		Votes	%	Seats
Social Democratic Party	PSD	110,035	53.21%	5
Socialist Party	PS	65,673	31.76%	3
CDS – People's Party	CDS–PP	22,374	10.82%	1
Unitary Democratic Coalition	CDU	3,202	1.55%	0
Left Bloc	BE	3,049	1.47%	0
Portuguese Workers' Communist Party	PCTP	778	0.38%	0
Humanist Party	PH	764	0.37%	0
People's Monarchist Party	PPM	496	0.24%	0
The Earth Party Movement	MPT	432	0.21%	0
Valid votes		206,803	100.00%	9
Blank votes		1,596	0.76%	
Rejected votes – other		2,217	1.05%	
Total polled		210,616	58.82%	
Registered electors		358,064		

The following candidates were elected: José Luís Arnaut (PSD); Ana Benavente (PS); José Cesário (PSD); Miguel Anacoreta Correia (CDS-PP); Miguel Ginestal (PS); António Almeida Henriques (PSD); José Junqueiro (PS); Carlos Andrade Miranda (PSD); and Melchior Moreira (PSD).

==== 1990s ====
===== 1999 =====
Results of the 1999 legislative election held on 10 October 1999:

Party		Votes	%	Seats
Social Democratic Party	PSD	90,305	45.25%	4
Socialist Party	PS	77,726	38.95%	4
CDS – People's Party	CDS–PP	21,300	10.67%	1
Unitary Democratic Coalition	CDU	4,479	2.24%	0
Left Bloc	BE	2,400	1.20%	0
Portuguese Workers' Communist Party	PCTP	996	0.50%	0
People's Monarchist Party	PPM	644	0.32%	0
National Solidarity Party	PSN	643	0.32%	0
Humanist Party	PH	616	0.31%	0
The Earth Party Movement	MPT	450	0.23%	0
Valid votes		199,559	100.00%	9
Blank votes		1,786	0.88%	
Rejected votes – other		2,422	1.19%	
Total polled		203,767	57.71%	
Registered electors		353,068		

The following candidates were elected: Ana Benavente (PS); José Cesário (PSD); Miguel Ginestal (PS); Basílio Horta (CDS-PP); José Junqueiro (PS); José Leitão (PS); Carlos Marta (PSD); Fernando Ruas (PSD); and Fernando Seara (PSD).

===== 1995 =====
Results of the 1995 legislative election held on 1 October 1995:

Party		Votes	%	Seats7
Social Democratic Party	PSD	96,145	45.26%	4
Socialist Party	PS	83,325	39.22%	4
CDS – People's Party	CDS–PP	24,904	11.72%	1
Unitary Democratic Coalition	CDU	3,887	1.83%	0
Portuguese Workers' Communist Party	PCTP	948	0.45%	0
Revolutionary Socialist Party	PSR	927	0.44%	0
People's Party	PG	915	0.43%	0
Popular Democratic Union	UDP	795	0.37%	0
National Solidarity Party	PSN	587	0.28%	0
Valid votes		212,433	100.00%	9
Blank votes		1,594	0.73%	
Rejected votes – other		3,187	1.47%	
Total polled		217,214	60.73%	
Registered electors		357,660		

The following candidates were elected: José Cesário (PSD); Falcão e Cunha (PSD); José Junqueiro (PS); José Leitão (PS); Figueiredo Lopes (PSD); Mário Videira Lopes (PS); António Galvão Lucas (CDS-PP); Fernando Ruas (PSD); and Joaquim Sarmento (PS).

===== 1991 =====
Results of the 1991 legislative election held on 6 October 1991:

Party		Votes	%	Seats
Social Democratic Party	PSD	140,582	65.69%	7
Socialist Party	PS	48,289	22.56%	2
Social Democratic Centre Party	CDS	13,697	6.40%	0
Unitary Democratic Coalition	CDU	4,499	2.10%	0
National Solidarity Party	PSN	2,920	1.36%	0
Revolutionary Socialist Party	PSR	1,345	0.63%	0
People's Monarchist Party	PPM	1,043	0.49%	0
Democratic Renewal Party	PRD	843	0.39%	0
Portuguese Workers' Communist Party	PCTP	801	0.37%	0
Valid votes		214,019	100.00%	9
Blank votes		1,606	0.73%	
Rejected votes – other		2,966	1.36%	
Total polled		218,591	63.39%	
Registered electors		344,858		

The following candidates were elected: Fernando Amaral (PSD); Fernando Andrade (PSD); José Manuel Barroso (PSD); Correia de Campos (PS); Vieira de Castro (PSD); José Cesário (PSD); Mário Videira Lopes (PS); Luís Martins (PSD); and Melchior Moreira (PSD).

==== 1980s ====
===== 1987 =====
Results of the 1987 legislative election held on 19 July 1987:

Party		Votes	%	Seats
Social Democratic Party	PSD	145,654	65.90%	8
Socialist Party	PS	40,762	18.44%	2
Social Democratic Centre Party	CDS	15,852	7.17%	0
Unitary Democratic Coalition	CDU	6,507	2.94%	0
Democratic Renewal Party	PRD	3,932	1.78%	0
Christian Democratic Party	PDC	3,482	1.58%	0
Revolutionary Socialist Party	PSR	1,006	0.46%	0
People's Monarchist Party	PPM	940	0.43%	0
Communist Party (Reconstructed)	PC(R)	818	0.37%	0
Portuguese Democratic Movement	MDP	817	0.37%	0
Popular Democratic Union	UDP	777	0.35%	0
Portuguese Workers' Communist Party	PCTP	461	0.21%	0
Valid votes		221,008	100.00%	10
Blank votes		1,800	0.79%	
Rejected votes – other		4,573	2.01%	
Total polled		227,381	68.62%	
Registered electors		331,364		

The following candidates were elected: Afonso Abrantes (PS); Fernando Amaral (PSD); António de Araújo (PSD); José Manuel Barroso (PSD); José Cesário (PSD); Manuel Freixo (PSD); Raul Junqueiro (PS); Luís Martins (PSD); António Matos (PSD); and João Montenegro (PSD).

===== 1985 =====
Results of the 1985 legislative election held on 6 October 1985:

Party		Votes	%	Seats
Social Democratic Party	PSD	83,913	38.85%	5
Socialist Party	PS	44,476	20.59%	2
Social Democratic Centre Party	CDS	44,257	20.49%	2
Democratic Renewal Party	PRD	24,163	11.19%	1
United People Alliance	APU	11,180	5.18%	0
Christian Democratic Party	PDC	2,753	1.27%	0
Popular Democratic Union	UDP	1,439	0.67%	0
Workers' Party of Socialist Unity	POUS	1,090	0.50%	0
Revolutionary Socialist Party	PSR	941	0.44%	0
Communist Party (Reconstructed)	PC(R)	908	0.42%	0
Portuguese Workers' Communist Party	PCTP	858	0.40%	0
Valid votes		215,978	100.00%	10
Blank votes		1,718	0.77%	
Rejected votes – other		5,049	2.27%	
Total polled		222,745	69.34%	
Registered electors		321,240		

The following candidates were elected: Fernando Amaral (PSD); José Cesário (PSD); Álvaro Figueiredo (PSD); Raul Junqueiro (PS); Armando Lopes (PS); Figueiredo Lopes (PSD); Luís Martins (PSD); João Meireles (PRD); João Morgado (CDS); and Gomes de Pinho (CDS).

===== 1983 =====
Results of the 1983 legislative election held on 25 April 1983:

Party		Votes	%	Seats
Social Democratic Party	PSD	81,494	37.94%	4
Socialist Party	PS	68,835	32.04%	4
Social Democratic Centre Party	CDS	46,015	21.42%	2
United People Alliance	APU	10,163	4.73%	0
Christian Democratic Party	PDC	3,233	1.51%	0
People's Monarchist Party	PPM	1,392	0.65%	0
Popular Democratic Union	UDP	1,105	0.51%	0
Revolutionary Socialist Party	PSR	794	0.37%	0
Workers' Party of Socialist Unity	POUS	760	0.35%	0
Portuguese Marxist–Leninist Communist Organization	OCMLP	577	0.27%	0
Portuguese Workers' Communist Party	PCTP	443	0.21%	0
Valid votes		214,811	100.00%	10
Blank votes		1,361	0.61%	
Rejected votes – other		6,611	2.97%	
Total polled		222,783	74.21%	
Registered electors		300,207		

The following candidates were elected: Fernando Amaral (PSD); João de Barros (PSD); José Cesário (PSD); António da Costa (PS); Armando Lopes (PS); Luís Martins (PSD); José Sarmento Moniz (CDS); Rui Cabral Neves (PS); Francisco Rodrigues (PS); and Manuel Vasconcelos (CDS).

===== 1980 =====
Results of the 1980 legislative election held on 5 October 1980:

Party		Votes	%	Seats
Democratic Alliance	AD	160,593	69.25%	8
Republican and Socialist Front	FRS	50,272	21.68%	2
United People Alliance	APU	11,936	5.15%	0
Workers' Party of Socialist Unity	POUS	3,294	1.42%	0
Popular Democratic Union	UDP	1,536	0.66%	0
Revolutionary Socialist Party	PSR	1,315	0.57%	0
Labour Party	PT	1,106	0.48%	0
Christian Democratic Party, Independent Movement for the National Reconstruction / Party of the Portuguese Right and National Front	PDC- MIRN/ PDP- FN	979	0.42%	0
Portuguese Workers' Communist Party	PCTP	861	0.37%	0
Valid votes		231,892	100.00%	10
Blank votes		1,376	0.57%	
Rejected votes – other		7,250	3.01%	
Total polled		240,518	82.15%	
Registered electors		292,767		

The following candidates were elected: Álvaro Barreto (AD); Borges de Carvalho (AD); Alberto Coimbra (AD); Álvaro Figueiredo (AD); António Barroso Gomes (FRS); Armando Lopes (FRS); Luís Martins (AD); João Morgado (AD); Ruy Oliveira (AD); and Manuel Vasconcelos (AD).

==== 1970s ====
===== 1979 =====
Results of the 1979 legislative election held on 2 December 1979:

Party		Votes	%	Seats
Democratic Alliance	AD	156,445	66.50%	8
Socialist Party	PS	52,183	22.18%	2
United People Alliance	APU	13,464	5.72%	0
Christian Democratic Party	PDC	4,032	1.71%	0
Popular Democratic Union	UDP	3,373	1.43%	0
Revolutionary Socialist Party	PSR	2,607	1.11%	0
Portuguese Workers' Communist Party	PCTP	1,613	0.69%	0
Left-wing Union for the Socialist Democracy	UEDS	999	0.42%	0
Portuguese Marxist–Leninist Communist Organization	OCMLP	544	0.23%	0
Valid votes		235,260	100.00%	10
Blank votes		1,656	0.68%	
Rejected votes – other		7,013	2.88%	
Total polled		243,929	85.32%	
Registered electors		285,903		

The following candidates were elected: Fernando Amaral (AD); Borges de Carvalho (AD); Álvaro Figueiredo (AD); António Barroso Gomes (PS); Armando Lopes (PS); Eduardo Loureiro (AD); Luís Martins (AD); João Morgado (AD); Ruy Oliveira (AD); and Manuel Vasconcelos (AD).

===== 1976 =====
Results of the 1976 legislative election held on 25 April 1976:

Party		Votes	%	Seats
Democratic People's Party	PPD	70,159	34.30%	4
Social Democratic Centre Party	CDS	67,864	33.18%	4
Socialist Party	PS	50,033	24.46%	3
Portuguese Communist Party	PCP	4,954	2.42%	0
Christian Democratic Party	PDC	2,342	1.14%	0
People's Monarchist Party	PPM	2,093	1.02%	0
Popular Democratic Union	UDP	2,026	0.99%	0
People's Socialist Front	FSP	1,194	0.58%	0
Movement of Socialist Left	MES	1,034	0.51%	0
Re-Organized Movement of the Party of the Proletariat	MRPP	815	0.40%	0
Worker–Peasant Alliance	AOC	792	0.39%	0
Communist Party of Portugal (Marxist–Leninist)	PCP(ML)	688	0.34%	0
Internationalist Communist League	LCI	554	0.27%	0
Valid votes		204,548	100.00%	11
Rejected votes		13,224	6.07%	
Total polled		217,772	78.40%	
Registered electors		277,780		

The following candidates were elected: Joaquim Guerra Alfaia (PPD); João Soeiro Carvalho (PPD); Jorge Dias (PPD); Álvaro Figueiredo (PPD); Armando Lopes (PS); Galvão de Melo (CDS); Álvaro Monteiro (PS); João Morgado (CDS); Rui Valadares (PS); Manuel Vasconcelos (CDS); and Ângelo Vieira (CDS).
