= Elza Pais =

Portuguese sociologist and politician

Secretary of State for Equality
- In office 26 October 2009 – 21 June 2011
- Prime Minister: José Sócrates
- Preceded by: Position established
- Succeeded by: Teresa Morais

Member of the Assembly of the Republic
- Incumbent
- Assumed office 26 March 2024
- Constituency: Viseu
- In office 15 October 2009 – 28 March 2022
- Constituency: Viseu (2009–2015); Coimbra (2015–2019); Leiria (2019–2022)

Personal details
- Born: Elza Maria Henriques Deus Pais; 22 November 1958 (age 67) Mangualde, Portugal
- Party: Socialist Party
- Education: ISCTE – University Institute of Lisbon; NOVA University Lisbon

Elza Maria Henriques Deus Pais (born 22 November 1958) is an academic specialising in sociology, who is a member of the Assembly of the Republic of Portugal and a former Secretary of State for Equality.

== Academic training ==
Elza Maria Henriques Deus Pais was born in Mangualde in Central Portugal on 22 November 1958. She obtained Undergraduate and master's degrees in sociology and studied for a PhD in the same subject. She became a researcher and lecturer at the Centro de Estudos de Sociologia (CES.NOVA) of the Faculty of Social and Human Sciences at the NOVA University Lisbon, which in 2015 became part of Centro Interdisciplinar de Ciências Sociais (Interdisciplinary Centre of Social Sciences – CICS.NOVA). She has also been a lecturer at the Catholic University of Portugal and at the Higher Institute of Social Service in Lisbon. She also served as President of the Portuguese Drugs and Drug Addiction Institute, now the Serviço de Intervenção nos Comportamentos Aditivos e nas Dependências (SICAD). Portugal has had a very successful programme of addressing addiction, based on decriminalisation of drug use In 2007, Pais was the Portuguese national coordinator for the European Year of Equal Opportunities for All.

== Political activities ==
Pais is a member of the Portuguese Socialist Party (PS). She became a Deputy in the 11th Legislature of the Assembly of the Republic in 2009, representing VIseu and was re-elected in 2011, in 2015 (representing Coimbra), and in 2019 (representing Leiria). She was not a candidate in the 2022 election. Between 2009 and 2011 she served as Secretary of State for Equality in the 18th Constitutional Government. Within the Assembly of the Republic, Pais was President of the Commission for Citizenship and Gender Equality, which replaced the Commission for Equality and Women's Rights. She was a member of the Committee on Constitutional Affairs, Rights, Freedoms and Guarantees and of the Subcommittee on Equality and Non-Discrimination. She was the Coordinator of the Assembly's Working Group on Medically Assisted Procreation Pais also writes articles for the Portuguese media, including Público.

== Publications ==
- Uma Década pela Igualdade e Contra a Violência de Género (A Decade for Equality and Against Gender Violence). Edições EsgotadasIdioma. ISBN 9789898801241. 2015.
- Homicídio Conjugal em Portugal - Rupturas Violentas da Conjugalidade (Conjugal Homicide in Portugal - Violent Breaks of Conjugality). Imprensa Nacional Casa da Moeda, ISBN 9789722718448 . 2010.

== Awards and honours ==
In 2007 Pais received the Arco-Íris (Rainbow) Award from Intervenção Lésbica, Gay, Bissexual, Trans e Intersexo (ILGA) for her fight against homophobia and for the recognition of LGBTI rights.
