= Inês Domingos =

Portuguese economist and politician

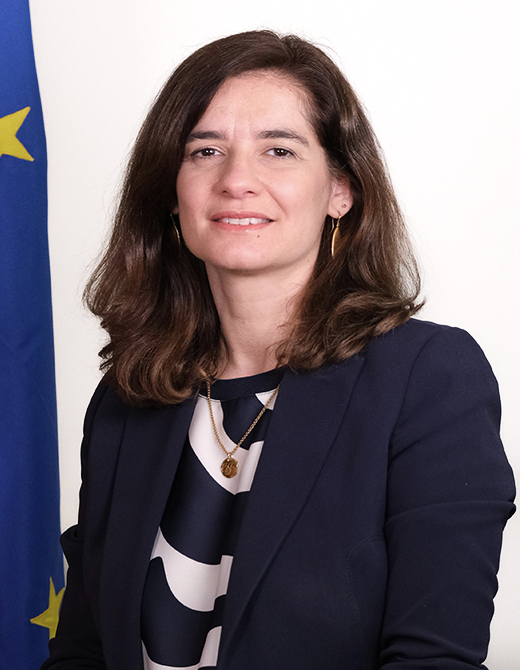
- Official portrait, 2024

Secretary of State for European Affairs
- Incumbent
- Assumed office 5 April 2024
- Prime Minister: Luís Montenegro
- Minister: Paulo Rangel

Member of the Assembly of the Republic
- In office 26 March 2024 – 5 April 2024
- Constituency: Viseu
- In office 23 October 2015 – 24 October 2019
- Constituency: Viseu

Personal details
- Born: Inês Carmelo Rosa Calado Lopes; 12 May 1977 (age 49)
- Party: Social Democratic Party
- Spouse: Hugo Ferreira Mendes Domingos
- Education: UCLouvain; Catholic University of Portugal
- Occupation: Economist • politician

Inês Carmelo Rosa Calado Lopes Domingos (born 1977) is a Portuguese politician and economist. From March 2021 to March 2024, she was an economic advisor to the president of Portugal. She is a member of the Social Democratic Party (PSD) and in the March 2024 national election she was elected to the Portuguese Assembly of the Republic, having previously served in the Assembly between 2015 and 2019.

== Early life and education ==
Domingos was born on 12 May 1977. She studied at the European School of Brussels, a school normally reserved for children of diplomats and EC officials, before moving to the Université Catholique de Louvain, where she completed a bachelor's degree in economics in 1999. In 2006 she obtained a master's in economics from the same university. She started to study for a PhD in international relations and political science at the Catholic University of Portugal (UCP) in 2017.

== Career ==
Inês Domingos is the Secretary of State for European Affairs of the Portuguese Government since 5 April 2024. Domingos worked as an economist in the economic research departments of Morgan Stanley and Goldman Sachs in London. Between 2009 and 2024 she was a teaching assistant at the Católica Lisbon School of Business & Economics, the business school of UCP. Between 2021 and 2024 she worked as an economics advisor to Marcelo Rebelo de Sousa, the president of Portugal. She also wrote regular columns in Portuguese newspapers, notably the online Observador.

== Political career ==
In the 2015 national election Domingos was elected to the National Assembly to represent the Viseu District as a member of the PSD, serving until 2019 and was reelected in 2024. She was not re-elected in the 2019 election nor in the 2022 election. In the 2024 election the PSD formed a coalition with two smaller parties to form the Democratic Alliance. The Alliance obtained three of the seats in the 8-seat Viseu constituency and Domingos was elected, being third on the Alliance's list. Domingos was the coordinator of the "Entrepreneurship, Innovation and Digitalization" committee of the PSD's National Strategy Council.

== Personal life ==
Domingos is married to Hugo Ferreira Mendes Domingos.
