= Ana Benavente =

Portuguese academic and politician (born 1945)

Ana Benavente GOIH

Member of the Assembly of the Republic
- In office 1995–2005
- Parliamentary group: Socialist Party (PS)
- Constituency: 1995–1999, Santarém; 1999–2005, Viseu

Secretary of State for Education
- In office 1995–2001

Personal details
- Born: 11 August 1945 (age 81) Cartaxo, Portugal
- Education: University of Geneva
- Occupation: Educationist

Ana Benavente (born 11 August 1945) is a Portuguese activist, educationist, university professor and politician who has served as secretary of state for education and member of the Assembly of the Republic.

== Early life ==
Benavente was born on 11 August 1945, the daughter of primary school teachers. Having lived the early years of her life in Cartaxo, a rural area to the northeast of Lisbon, she arrived in the Portuguese capital in 1960/61 to complete her high school studies at the Maria Amália Vaz de Carvalho High School, living as a boarder. A good student, she was admitted in 1962/63 to the Faculty of Arts of the University of Lisbon without needing to take an entrance exam.

In her first days of college, she joined a student organization led by José Medeiros Ferreira, who would later be expelled from the university by the authoritarian Estado Novo government for leading protests. Around this time, she also met Odete Santos, a law student who, like her and Ferreira, would go on to become members of the Assembly of the Republic after the Estado Novo had been overthrown.

== Exile ==
In 1964, she married a law student as a way of achieving some autonomy by escaping from government or convent-run hostels that young women were supposed to live in while at university. In these hostels the students' mail was opened and read and the windows of their rooms had padlocks. Going to Mass was mandatory. Her husband did not want to be drafted to go to one of Portugal's colonies and so the two of them left to go to Geneva in Switzerland. There, she took odd jobs in factories, offices, etc. to pay for her studies. In her third year in Switzerland, she received a small grant given to refugees, which met her costs during term time. Benavente studied at the Jean-Jacques Rousseau Institute, directed by Jean Piaget and was later employed there during the period when it became the Faculty of Psychology and Educational Sciences of the University of Geneva. Piaget had founded the International Bureau of Education (BIE), the first international organization in the field of education. Benavente went on to become an educationist and vice-chair of BIE between 2001 and 2006.

While in exile she joined the Portuguese Communist Party but resigned in 1968 as a result of the Warsaw Pact invasion of Czechoslovakia. She named her eldest daughter "Rosa", after the revolutionary socialist, Rosa Luxemburg. Benavente has noted that after the stifling atmosphere of Portuguese academia, the freedom of debate at university in Geneva was a refreshing change. She read Piaget, Bärbel Inhelder, Émile Durkheim, Karl Marx, Pierre Bourdieu, Herbert Marcuse, and many others. She worked with Swiss groups who supported independence movements in Portuguese colonies and welcomed Portuguese deserters. In the early 1970s she moved into a commune, members of which helped her raise her daughter. Later she would try, without success, to establish a commune in Portugal.

In 1999, 25 years after the Carnation Revolution, former Portuguese emigrées in Geneva, including Benavente, paid tribute to the city, thanking it for the exile it granted them. They left a plaque (made of Portuguese marble) on the wall of a famous and now-defunct university café.

== Return to Portugal ==
Benavente returned to Portugal in 1974 after the overthrow of the Estado Novo by the Carnation Revolution. In Switzerland she had been well known, but in Portugal no one knew her and she knew nobody. She was accepted as an intern at the Faculty of Sciences of the University of Lisbon in the Department of Education, after a competitive exam. She wrote a book titled "Primary School Portuguese: Stories of Freedom". Later, this was to penalise her in an academic competition, with the jury considering that the university didn't have the need to deal with that level of education. She then began to research the factors leading to school failure in the Ajuda parish of Lisbon, involving schools and the community, which gave rise to her book "On the Other Side of School". More recently, Benavente has been a full professor and president of the ethics committee of the Universidade Lusófona in Lisbon and has contributed to newspapers such as Público.

Benavente obtained a PhD in the sociology of education from the University of Geneva in 1985. She was a professor with the Department of Education of the University of Lisbon until 1993, when she was appointed as principal researcher of the Institute of Social Sciences (ICS) of the university. There she developed a programme for educational improvement in Portugal, which emphasised (1) pre-school education; (2) a consistent approach to education regardless of the political party in power, ensuring the autonomy of schools; (3) medium- and long-term guidelines for elementary and secondary education; (4) emphasis on the most vulnerable and an avoidance of exclusion; and (5) adult education. She also stressed the need for school sports, health and sex education, and the upgrading of teacher training.

Having joined the Socialist Party (PS) in 1993, Benavente held a government post as secretary of state for education between 1995 and 2001, when António Guterres was prime minister. In the October 1995 election she was also elected to the Assembly of the Republic as a representative of the Santarém constituency, being re-elected in the 1999 election and serving until 2005 as a representative of the Viseu constituency. She later became disenchanted with the PS, particularly with its education policy, and resigned from the party, subsequently voting for the extreme left Left Bloc.

== Awards and honours ==
Benavente was made a Commander of the Spanish Order of Isabella the Catholic in 2000 and a Grand Officer of the Portuguese Order of Prince Henry in 2005.
