= António Lacerda Sales =

Portuguese politician

Secretary of State of Health
- In office 26 October 2019 – 13 September 2022
- Prime Minister: António Costa
- Preceded by: Francisco Ramos
- Succeeded by: Ricardo Mestre

Member of the Assembly of the Republic
- In office 23 October 2015 – 25 March 2024
- Constituency: Leiria

Personal details
- Born: 3 June 1962 (age 63) Caldas da Rainha, Portugal
- Party: Socialist Party

António Lacerda Sales (born 3 June 1962) is a Portuguese politician of the Socialist Party who served as the Secretary of State of Health between 2019 and 2022.

== Political career ==
Lacerda Sales became a deputy in the Assembly of the Republic after being elected in the 2015 legislative election. He was reelected in 2019 and after the election he was appointed Secretary of State of Health by Prime Minister António Costa.

In the 2021 local elections, he became President of the Municipal Assembly of Leiria after winning an absolute majority of seats.

In 2022, he was chosen to be the head candidate for the Socialist Party in Leiria, district in which he had been elected in the two previous elections. For the first time in history, the Socialist Party won Leiria, a district that had been won by the PSD since 1975.

After the election, he kept his job as Secretary of State until 13 September 2022, when he resigned after Marta Temido left her position as Minister of Health.

In 2023, he was chosen to be the President of the Inquiry Commission to the Administration of TAP.
