= Joaquim Sarmento =

Portuguese politician (1952–2026)

Member of the Assembly of the Republic of Portugal for Viseu
- In office 27 October 1995 – 4 April 2002

Personal details
- Born: Joaquim Sebastião Sarmento da Fonseca Almeida; 17 January 1952 Lamego, Portugal
- Died: 8 August 2026 (aged 74) Resende, Portugal
- Party: PS
- Education: University of Lisbon
- Occupation: Lawyer

Joaquim Sebastião Sarmento da Fonseca Almeida (17 January 1952 – 8 August 2026) was a Portuguese politician. A member of the Socialist Party, he served in the Assembly of the Republic from 1995 to 2002.

Sarmento died in Resende on 8 August 2026, at the age of 74.
