= Celeste Cardona =

Portuguese lawyer and politician

Celeste Cardona GOIH
- Parliamentary group: CDS – People's Party
- Constituency: Leiria

Deputy of the Assembly of the Republic of Portugal
- In office 1995–2005

Minister of Justice
- In office 2002–2004

Member of the European Parliament
- In office 1997–1999

Personal details
- Born: 30 June 1951 (age 75) Anadia, Portugal
- Party: Portuguese: CDS – People's Party; EU: Union for Europe
- Education: University of Lisbon

Maria Celeste Ferreira Lopes Cardona is Portuguese lawyer and politician. She is a former Minister of Justice and a former deputy in the Assembly of the Republic of Portugal.

== Early life ==
Maria Celeste Ferreira Lopes Cardona was born on 30 June 1951 in Anadia in the Aveiro District of Portugal. She graduated in law at the Faculty of Law of the University of Lisbon, following this with a master's degree in tax law and a doctorate in legal and economic sciences, presenting a thesis on independent regulatory authorities.

== Career ==
Cardona taught administrative and tax law as an assistant professor at the University of Lisbon law faculty. She also worked for the Portuguese Centre for Tax Studies at the Ministry of Finance and has represented Portugal at the OECD. She was appointed administrator of Caixa Geral de Depósitos (CGD) a state-owned bank, in 2005. In this context she was criticised for her role in the CGD's loan of money to a leading Portuguese businessman, Joe Berardo. She became a member of the general and supervisory board of the EDP Group, Portugal's largest energy company, after its final phase of nationalisation in 2012. Cardona also continues to consult on legal issues relating to tax. She teaches at the Lusíada University and has published several articles on tax issues.

== Political career ==
Following the Carnation Revolution in 1974, which overthrew the authoritarian Estado Novo regime, Cardona joined the Democratic and Social Centre, now the CDS – People's Party. In 1992 she supported Manuel Monteiro for the leadership of the party. After his victory, she was, successively, a member of the CDS-PP Steering Committee, its National Council, its Political Commission and its Lisbon Political Committee. Cardona was a member of the European Parliament between January 1997 and July 1999, the last term of the Parliament without direct elections. In 1999 she was asked to head the list of the party's candidates for Leiria in the national elections and was elected to the Assembly of the Republic in that year, being re-elected in 2002 until 2005. In April 2002 her party became part of a coalition government and she was appointed Minister of Justice, losing the position when the government changed in July 2004.

== Honours and awards ==
- On 6 March 1998, Cardona was made a Grand Officer of the Portuguese Order of Prince Henry.
