= Heitor de Sousa =

Portuguese economist and politician

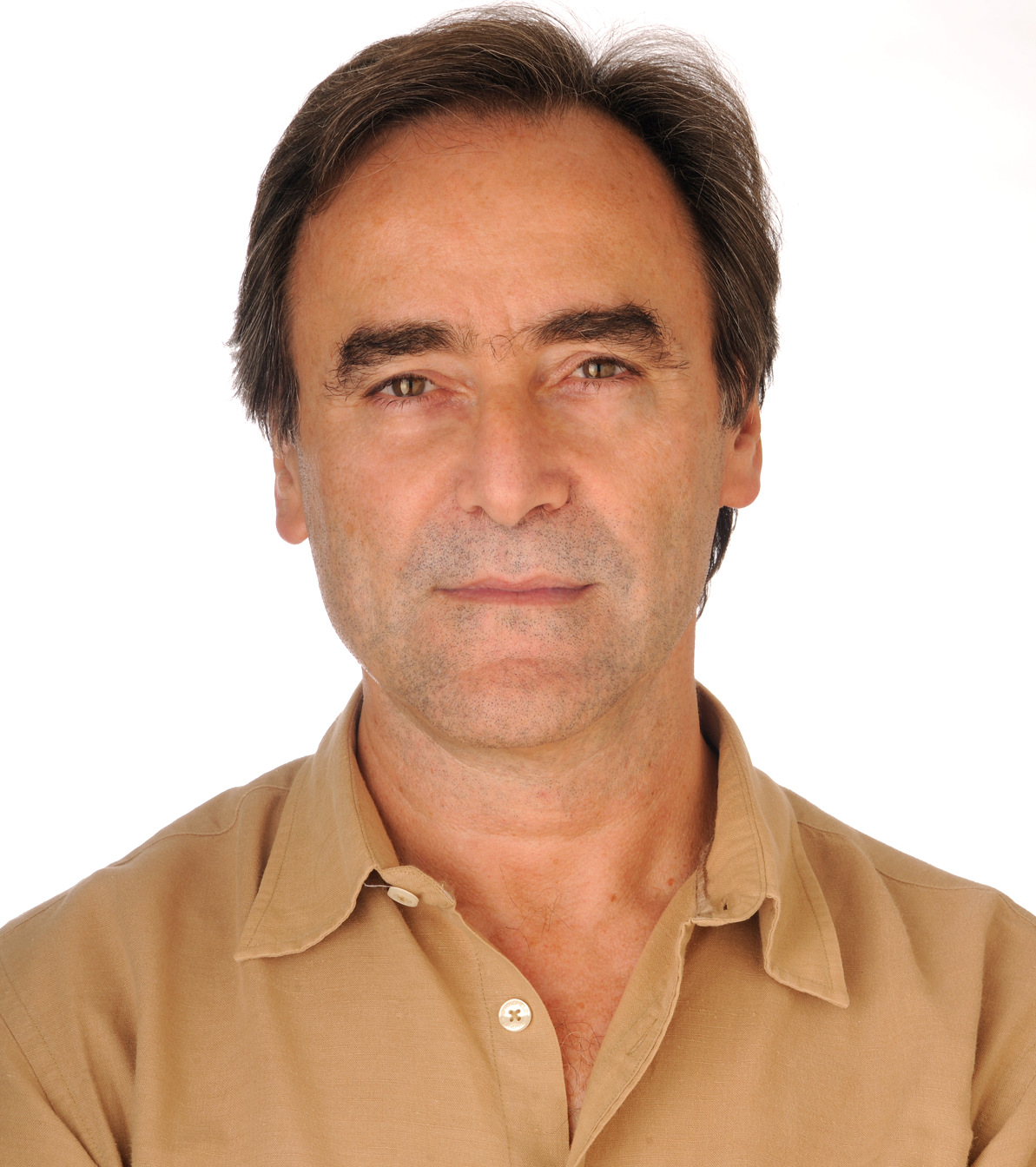
- Heitor de Sousa in 2009

Member of the Assembly of the Republic
- In office 23 October 2015 – 25 October 2019
- Constituency: Leiria
- In office 15 October 2009 – 19 June 2011
- Constituency: Leiria

Personal details
- Born: Heitor Nuno Patrício de Sousa e Castro; 5 April 1953 (age 73)
- Party: Left Bloc
- Other political affiliations: Revolutionary Socialist Party (until 1999)
- Occupation: Politician

Heitor Nuno Patrício de Sousa e Castro (born 5 April 1953) is a Portuguese economist and politician, who was a member of the Assembly of the Republic, first elected in 2009.
