= Almerindo Marques =

Portuguese businessman and politician (1939–2021)

Member of the Assembly of the Republic of Portugal
- In office 1983–1985
- Constituency: Leiria

Personal details
- Born: Almerindo da Silva Marques; 20 December 1939 Leiria, Leiria, Portugal
- Died: 1 December 2021 (aged 81) Lisbon, Portugal
- Party: PS

Almerindo da Silva Marques (20 December 1939 – 1 December 2021) was a Portuguese businessman and politician.

== Biography ==
Marques earned a licenciate degree in Economy and Finance from the Lisbon School of Economics and Management in 1969. In the 1970s, he became Secretary-General of the Banco da Agricultura, and simultaneously joined the Socialist Party following the collapse of the Estado Novo. From 1983 to 1985, he served in Leiria in the Assembly of the Republic. He subsequently resumed his professional career, joining Banco Espírito Santo.

Marques became founding President of the Sociedade Interbancária de Serviços, serving until 1986. He then served on the board of directors of Banco Fonsecas & Burnay from 1986 to 1989 and subsequently was Portugal's regional director for Barclays. He was Director of Caixa Geral de Depósitos from 1998 to 2002 and Director of Banco Nacional Ultramarino from 1999 to 2002.

In 2002, Marques resigned from Caixa Geral de Depósitos over a disagreement with its President, António de Sousa. That year, he was appointed President of Rádio e Televisão de Portugal. He was responsible for carrying out a financial restructuring of the company. He was then appointed President of Infraestruturas de Portugal in 2007, a position from which he resigned in 2011. He then became President of Opway.

Almerindo Marques died in Lisbon on 1 December 2021 at the age of 81.
