= Fernando Ruas =

Portuguese economist and politician (born 1949)

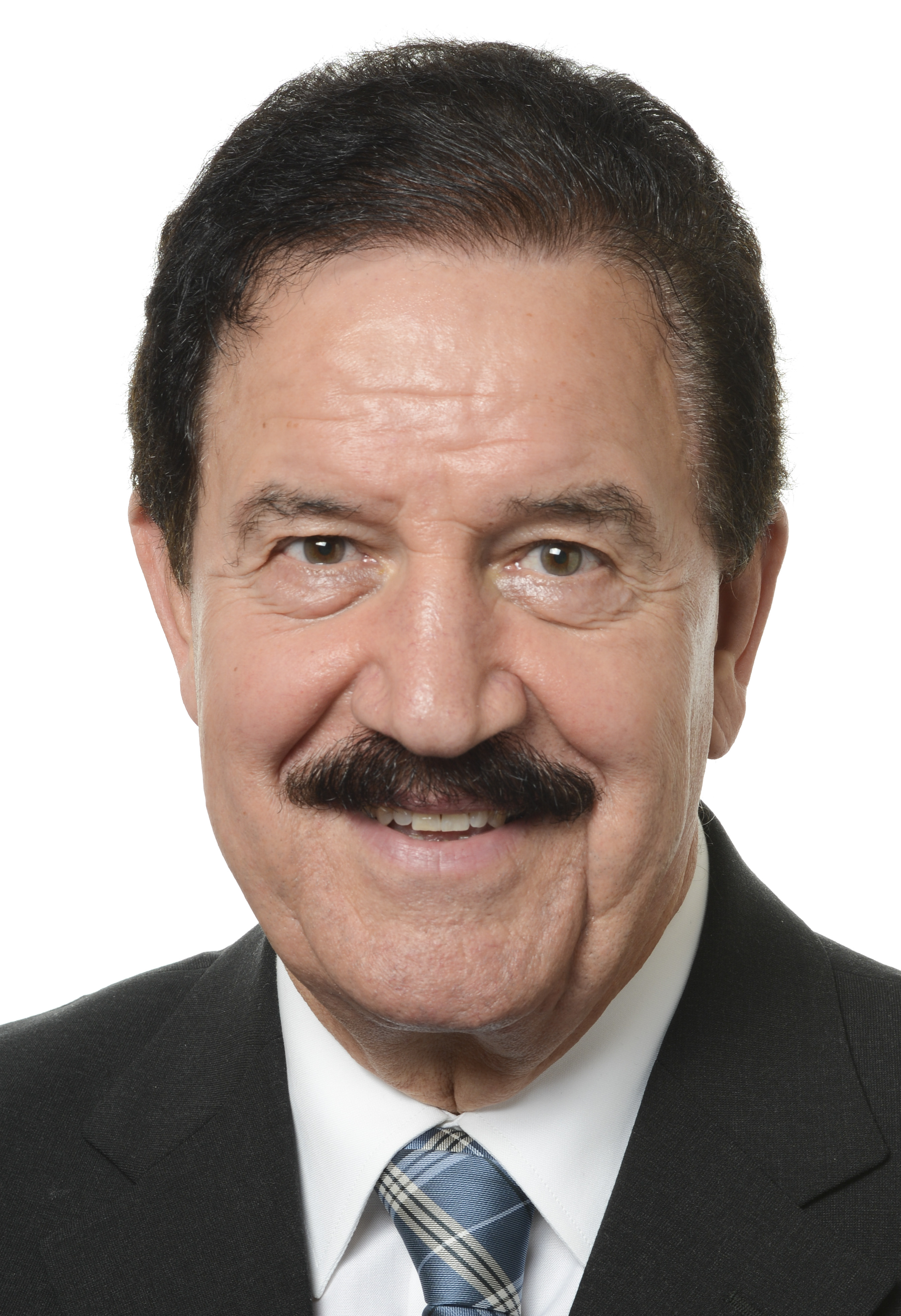
- Official portrait as an MEP, 2014

Mayor of Viseu
- In office 13 October 2021 – 31 October 2025
- Preceded by: Conceição Azevedo
- Succeeded by: João Azevedo
- In office 6 January 1990 – 22 October 2013
- Preceded by: Manuel Augusto Engrácia Carrilho
- Succeeded by: António Almeida Henriques

Member of the Assembly of the Republic
- In office 25 October 2019 – 3 October 2021
- Constituency: Viseu

Member of the European Parliament
- In office 2 July 2014 – 1 July 2019
- Constituency: Portugal

Personal details
- Born: Fernando de Carvalho Ruas; 15 January 1949 (age 77) Farminhão, Viseu, Portugal
- Party: Social Democratic Party (since 1983)
- Spouse: Maria de Deus Ruas (m. 1976)
- Children: 2
- Education: University of Coimbra
- Occupation: Economist • Politician

Fernando de Carvalho Ruas (born 15 January 1949) is a Portuguese economist and politician from the Social Democratic Party. He was the Mayor of Viseu, between 2021 and 2025. He was also Mayor of Viseu between 1990 and 2013.

== Early life ==
Fernando de Carvalho Ruas was born on 15 January 1949, in the Farminhão Parish (since 2013, Union of Parishes of Boa Aldeia, Farminhão and Torredeita), in the city of Viseu, Portugal. He is the youngest of 12 children (6 boys and 6 girls).

He has a degree in economics from the faculty of economics of the University of Coimbra (1978).

He was a secondary school teacher between 1973 and 1982. That year he became Principal Advisor for Public administration, having become, in 1986, a member of the Social Security Board of Viseu.

== Political career ==
He was Mayor of Viseu between 1989 and 2013 for the PPD/PSD, having been succeeded by António Almeida Henriques.

He was also President of ANMP - National Association of Portuguese Municipalities (2002 to 2013). This role made him the ANMP representative on the Council of European Cities and Regions. He was President of the District Assembly of the PSD of Viseu from 1990 to 2013 and President of the board of directors of the Municipal Water and Sanitation Services of Viseu from 1990 to 2013.

He was a member of the European Parliament between 2014 and 2019. He was a member of the Assembly of the Republic in the 14th legislature, in 2019, as lead candidate for the Viseu electoral circle. He was a member of Parliament between October 25, 2019, and October 3, 2021, when he resigned to run for the Viseu mayorship in the 2021 local elections.

He was also President of the PSD/Viseu from 1983 to 1987, vice-president of the PSD National Congress from 1999 to 2007 and vice-president of the PSD/Viseu District Assembly from 1997 to 1999. He currently holds the position of President of the District Assembly of PSD (since 2005) and was President of the PSD National Congress from 2010 to 2018.

He was a founding member of the Committee of the Regions in 1994, and served until 2013. He was a member of the Congress of Local and Regional Authorities of the Council of Europe from 2001 to 2004.

He was President of the Permanent Cabinet of the Portuguese-Spanish Association of Municipalities 'A route to Europe' between 1999 and 2000, Member of the Executive Cabinet of the World Council of United Cities and Local Governments between 2006 and 2013, and President of the Foral CPLP – Forum of Local Authorities of the Community of Portuguese Language Countries – between 2009 and 2013.

== Personal life ==
He is married, has two children and four grandchildren.
