= Calde =

Civil parish in the municipality of Viseu, Portugal

- Civil parish
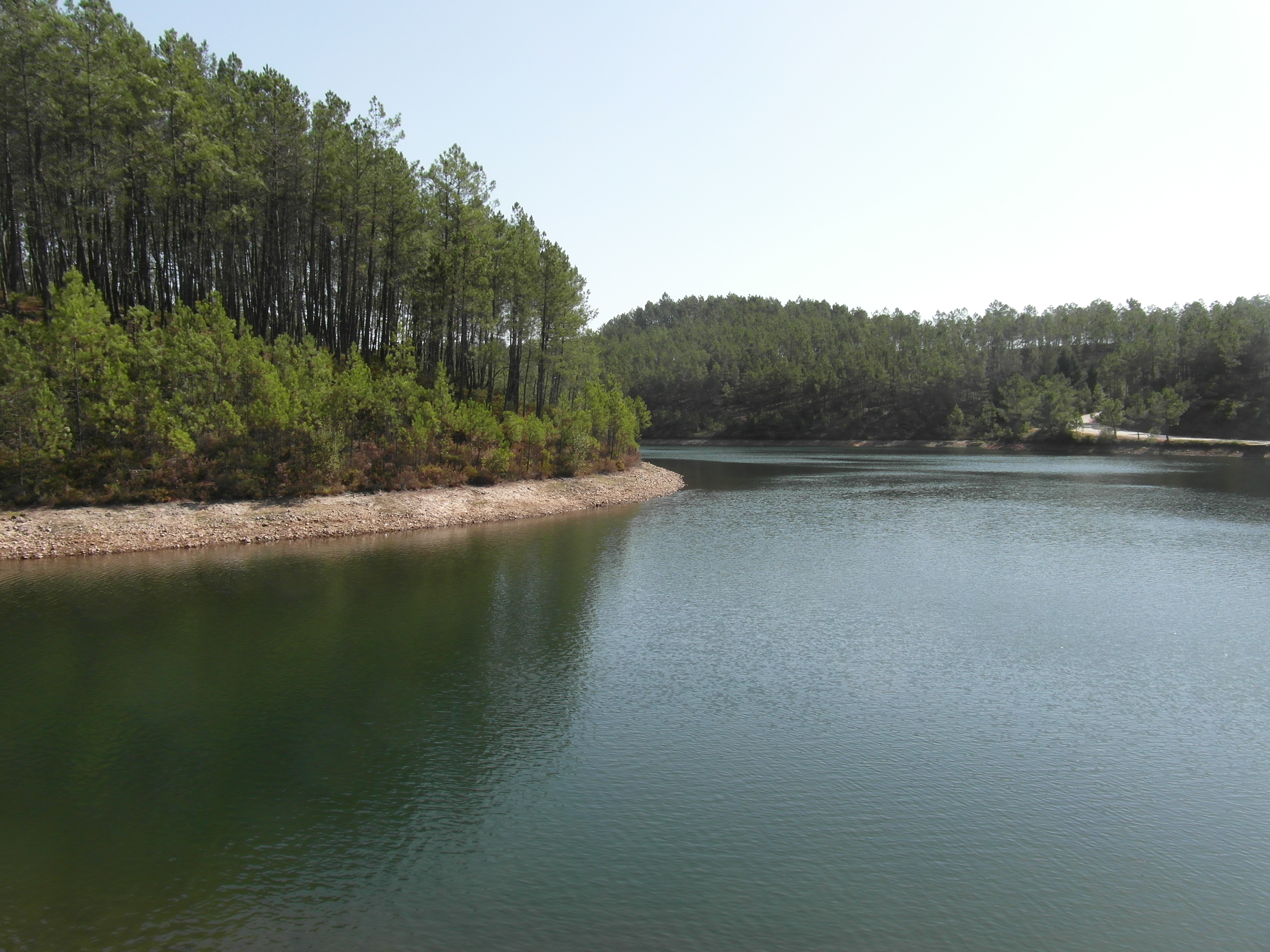
- Lake near Calde

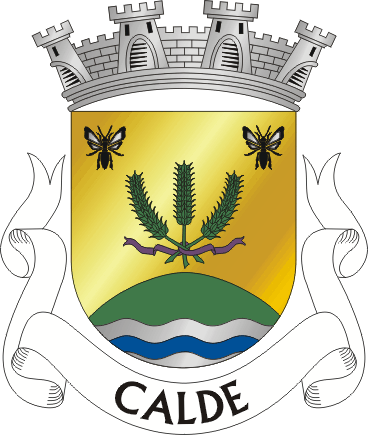
- Coat of arms

- Location in Portugal
- Coordinates: 40.783333°N 7.9°W
- Country: Portugal
- Region: Norte
- Intermunic. comm.: Douro
- District: Viseu
- Municipality: Viseu

Area
  - Total: 35.06 km^{2} (13.54 sq mi)

Population (2011)
  - Total: 1,271
  - Density: 36.25/km^{2} (93.89/sq mi)
- Time zone: UTC+00:00 (WET)
  - Summer (DST): UTC+01:00 (WEST)

Calde is a civil parish (freguesia) in the municipality of Viseu, in Portugal. The population in 2011 was 1271 and population density was 36 inhabitants per square kilometre, in an area of 35.06 km^{2}.
