= António Almeida Henriques =

Portuguese politician (1961–2021)

Mayor of Viseu
- In office 22 October 2013 – 4 April 2021
- Preceded by: Fernando Ruas
- Succeeded by: Conceição Azevedo

Secretary of State for Economy and Regional Development
- In office 21 June 2011 – 13 April 2013
- Prime Minister: Pedro Passos Coelho

Member of the Assembly of the Republic
- In office 25 May 2002 – 28 June 2011
- Constituency: Viseu

Personal details
- Born: António Joaquim Almeida Henriques; 5 May 1961 Viseu, Portugal
- Died: 4 April 2021 (aged 59) Viseu, Portugal
- Party: Social Democratic Party
- Children: 3

António Joaquim Almeida Henriques (5 May 1961 – 4 April 2021) was a Portuguese politician and lawyer. A member of the Social Democratic Party, he served as Mayor of Viseu from 2013 until his death in 2021, and as a member of the Assembly of the Republic from 2002 to 2011. He served as Deputy State Secretary for Economy and Regional Development in the XIX Constitutional Government of Portugal from 2011 to 2013. He was also vice-president of the Confederação da Indústria Portuguesa from 2005 to 2010.

António Almeida Henriques died of COVID-19 in Viseu, on 4 April 2021, at the age of 59.
