= Abraveses =

- Civil parish
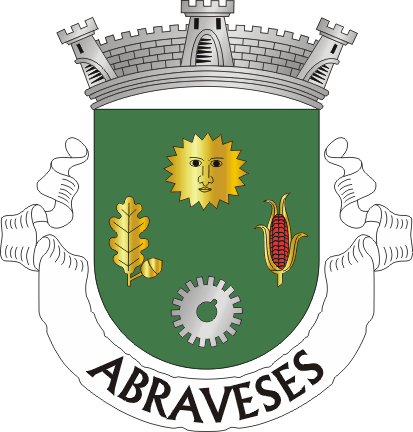
- Coat of arms

- Location in Portugal
- Coordinates: 40.677°N 7.921°W
- Country: Portugal
- Region: Centro
- Intermunic. comm.: Viseu Dão Lafões
- District: Viseu
- Municipality: Viseu

Area
  - Total: 12.23 km^{2} (4.72 sq mi)

Population (2011)
  - Total: 8,539
  - Density: 700/km^{2} (1,800/sq mi)
- Time zone: UTC+00:00 (WET)
  - Summer (DST): UTC+01:00 (WEST)
- Postal code: 3515
- Area code: 232

Abraveses is a Freguesia in the municipality (concelho) of Viseu, in the Portuguese central subregion of Dão-Lafões. The population in 2011 was 8,539, in an area of 12.23 km². Abraveses lies 3 kilometres (1.9 mi) north of the centre of the city of Viseu, intimately linked to the historic settlement, and located along an extensive connection between Viseu-Castro Daire and Viseu-São Pedro do Sul.

== History ==
Abraveses has historically been at the crossroads that linked Viseu and Porto, through Ribeira, Lava and Abraveses until Moselos, Travanca, Bodiosa, Gumiei and São Pedro do Sul. The Roman road split near Pedro do Sul, to the Minho and Braga. But, the early settlement was also near the prehistoric castros of Santa Luzia and Senhora do Castro. Monte de Santa Luzia, where the early castro was located, was until the 19th century called Monte de São Gens, referring to the saint to which the chapel was devoted.

It was along the mount that the first settlements began in Viseu, around the 10th to 8th centuries BC. It was a walled settlement, that was eventually abandoned, likely around the 1st century, when Roman forces opted to reorganize the politico-administrative and religious activities of the region, concentrating on Viseu. One of the characteristics of the prehistoric peoples was the artesnal production of iron, from many of the implements discovered in the excavation of the settlement.

During the high Middle Ages, Abraveses was a rural village and place integrated into the parish of Santa Maria da Sé. Through this it was linked ecclesiastically to the central parish of Viseu, until the 13th century. The region maintained its "special" agricultural economy, but also produced artisanal products to the markets of Viseu. Traditionally, the area was also known for the numerous tamanqueiros which produced clogs or punches that were used by tinsmiths, blacksmiths and basket weavers who filled the fairs with their products and objects. In the middle of the 20th century, a process of intense development began, based on the region's accessibility.

=== 20th century ===
Abraveses is linked to Viseu by a long 3 kilometres (1.9 mi) roadway, that after the First World War became known as Avenida da Bélgica. Until then it was simply known as the Estrada Nova de Abraveses, where it was the grande avenue of Viseu, with many of the residences linked to water, light and telephone services, many improvements that were unavailable in the remaining parishes.

In 1991, Abraveses had a population that exceed 6000 inhabitants, a prosperous parish where many business installed their operations, especially those in furniture and confectionery services.

== Geography ==
Abraveses, has a resident population of 8539 individuals, resulting from a demographic increase of 50% by the end of the 20th century, that included a visible growth in the urban territory.

Residential growth included a 71% growth in area, with a 50% increase in the number of new homes constructed. This change has been the result of overflow from Viseu, who see Abraveses as a "bedroom community" of the much larger polity. The parish contains the settlements Abraveses, Aguieira, Esculca, Moure de Carvalhal, Pascoal, Póvoa de Abraveses, Santiago and Santo Estêvão.
