= João Azevedo (Portuguese politician) =

Portuguese politician (born 1974)

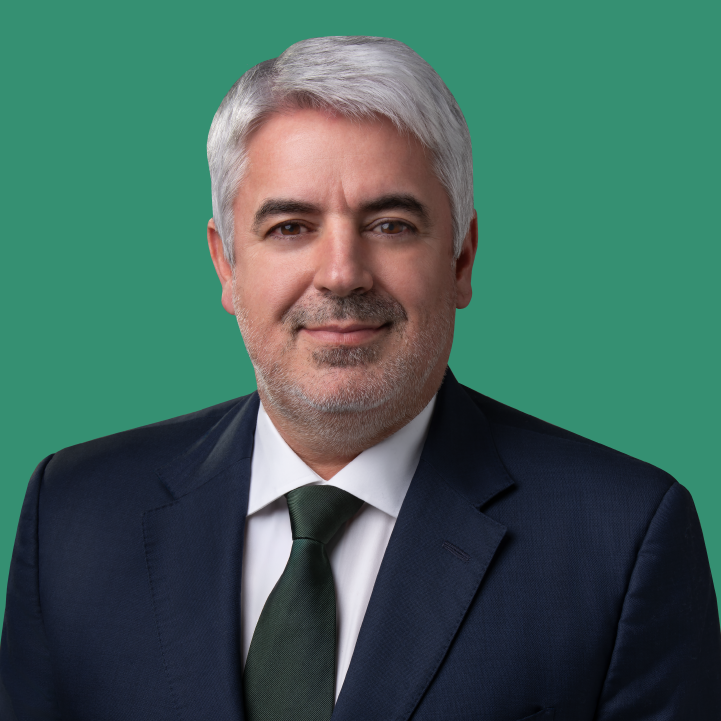
- João Azevedo in 2025

Mayor of Viseu
- Incumbent
- Assumed office 31 October 2025
- Preceded by: Fernando Ruas

Member of the Assembly of the Republic
- In office 25 October 2019 – 2 June 2025
- Constituency: Viseu

Member of the Viseu City Council
- Incumbent
- Assumed office 26 September 2021
- Mayor: Fernando Ruas; Himself

Mayor of Mangualde
- In office 31 October 2009 – 25 October 2019
- Preceded by: António Soares Marques
- Succeeded by: Elísio Oliveira

Personal details
- Born: João Nuno Ferreira Gonçalves Azevedo; 6 December 1974 (age 51) Viseu, Portugal
- Party: Socialist Party
- Occupation: Teacher • politician

João Nuno Ferreira Gonçalves Azevedo (born 6 December 1974) is a Portuguese politician, and the Mayor of Viseu, since 2025. He was a Member of the Portuguese Assembly since the 14th legislature, which started in 2019, for the Socialist Party (PS). He has a degree in Physical Education.

Azevedo was the mayor of Mangualde, his hometown, since 2009 and left office halfway through, in 2019, to take up the position of deputy in the Assembly of the Republic, for which he is running as PS list head in Viseu in the 2019 legislative elections.

On 29 May 2020, it was announced that he would be a candidate for Viseu City Council, in the 2021 local elections. He lost the election to Fernando Ruas, but was elected as a councillor for Viseu City Council for the 2021-2025 term.

Following the Socialist Party winning an absolute majority in the 2022 legislative elections, Azevedo reported that he was invited by António Costa to form part of his new government. However, Azevedo rejected the invitation, stating he his determined to win the Viseu City Council and that's his promise to the people of Viseu.
