= Luís Paulo Fernandes =

Portuguese politician (born 1976)

Member of the Assembly of the Republic
- Incumbent
- Assumed office 26 March 2024
- Constituency: Leiria

Personal details
- Born: Luís Paulo Pereira Fernandes; 26 October 1976 (age 49) Pedrógão Grande, Portugal
- Party: Chega (since 2019)
- Other political affiliations: Social Democratic Party (until 2019)
- Occupation: Politician

Luís Paulo Pereira Fernandes (born 28 October 1976) is a Portuguese politician serving as a member of the Assembly of the Republic since 2024. He has served as leader of Chega in the Leiria District since 2019.

He was the head of the Chega party list in the 2019 legislative elections, and ranked second on the list in both 2022 and 2024, running behind Gabriel Mithá Ribeiro. He was only elected to parliament in the latter election.
