= Gabriel Mithá Ribeiro =

Portuguese teacher and politician

Gabriel Mitha Ribeiro
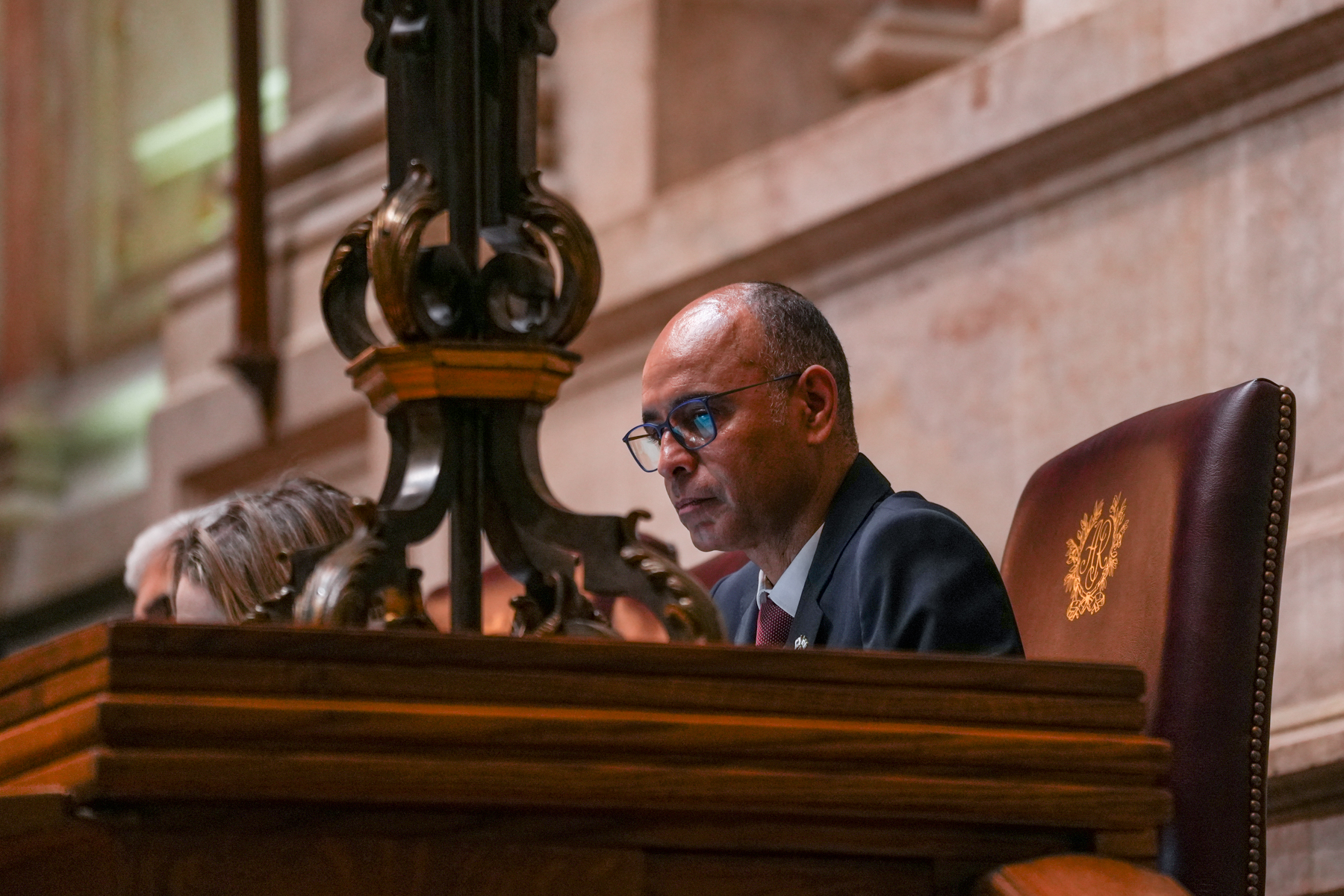
- Mithá Ribeiro in 2024

Member of the Assembly of the Republic
- In office 29 March 2022 – 22 September 2025
- Constituency: Leiria

Personal details
- Born: Gabriel Sérgio Mithá Ribeiro; 23 September 1965 (age 61) Lourenço Marques, Portuguese Mozambique, Portugal
- Citizenship: Portugal; Mozambique
- Party: CH (2019–2025)
- Other political affiliations: PPD/PSD (2004–2019)
- Education: University of Lisbon; ISCTE-IUL
- Occupation: Historian • author • journalist • politician

Gabriel Sérgio Mithá Ribeiro (born 23 August 1965) is a Mozambican-born Portuguese professor, historian, author, journalist and politician.

Since 2022 he has been a deputy in the Assembly of the Republic of Portugal for the Chega party, representing the Leiria constituency. He was also a vice-president of Chega.

== Biography ==
=== Early life and education ===
Mitha Ribeiro was born in 1965 in the colony of Mozambique which at the time was governed by Portugal. His father was a Catholic and his mother came from a Muslim background. He is primarily of African descent with some Indian and Syrian ancestry on his mother's side. Mitha Ribeiro emigrated to Portugal in 1980 following the independence of Mozambique and settled in Pombal. He is married to a Portuguese national with whom he has a son. Mitha Ribeiro studied a history degree at the University of Lisbon followed by a master's degree and a PhD in African studies at ISCTE-IUL.

=== Professional career ===
He worked as a teacher of history and Africanist studies before becoming a columnist for Observador. Mitha Ribeiro has also written a number of books and academic articles discussing Portuguese, Mozambican and African colonial history. He has also commented on Portuguese current affairs in essays and articles. In his writing, he has argued that racism as a concept makes no sense in the twenty first century and that racial prejudice mostly disappeared following the end of colonialism. He instead advocates that the terms Racial Relations and Interracial Relations be used instead. He also argues that Portuguese schools should change the way they teach about colonialism and show pupils positive examples from chapters of European colonialism in Africa.

=== Political activity ===
Mithá Ribeiro was a member of the Social Democratic Party for fifteen years before joining Chega in 2019. He has been noted by the media as a prominent ethnic minority member of the party and for his rapid rise within Chega, having become a parliamentary deputy, the author of the party's program ahead of the 2022 Portuguese legislative election and being appointed a vice-chairman of the party.

During the 2022 legislative election, he stood in the Leiria constituency and was elected to the Assembly of the Republic. After his election, he was nominated as Chega's candidate to stand for vice-president of the Assembly of the Republic, with Chega becoming eligible to nominate a candidate due to being the third largest parliamentary group, and after the Assembly rejected Diogo Pacheco de Amorim's candidacy. However, the other parties also rejected Mithá Ribeiro for the position. At a press conference following the decision, Mithá Ribeiro stated "If a person is black and is on the left, he is treated with dignity or at least with some dignity. If a person is black and is politically neutral tends to be erased from institutions. If a person is black and is on the right, they are treated, excuse the force of expression, as blacks are treated"

In the Assembly, Mithá Ribeiro sits on the committees for education, schools, energy and the environment.
