= Leiria (Assembly of the Republic constituency) =

Constituency of the Assembly of the Republic, the national legislature of Portugal

- Constituency for the Assembly of the Republic
- Location of Leiria within Portugal
- District: Leiria
- Population: 486,583 (2024)
- Electorate: 411,995 (2025)
- Area: 3,506 km^{2} (2024)

Current Constituency
- Created: 1976
- Seats: List: 10 (1991–present); 11 (1976–1991)
- Deputies: List: Ricardo Carvalho (PSD); Eurico Brilhante Dias (PS); Luís Paulo Fernandes (CH); Rui Fernandes (CH); Célia Freire (PSD); Cristina Vieira Henriques (CH); Catarina Louro (PS); Hugo Patrício Oliveira (PSD); João Antunes Santos (PSD); Liliana Sousa (PSD)

Leiria is one of the 22 multi-member constituencies of the Assembly of the Republic, the national legislature of Portugal. The constituency was established in 1976 when the Assembly of the Republic was established by the constitution following the restoration of democracy. It is conterminous with the district of Leiria. The constituency currently elects ten of the 230 members of the Assembly of the Republic using the closed party-list proportional representation electoral system. At the 2025 legislative election it had 411,995 registered electors.

== Electoral system ==
Leiria currently elects ten of the 230 members of the Assembly of the Republic using the closed party-list proportional representation electoral system. Seats are allocated using the D'Hondt method.

== Election results ==
=== Summary ===
Election	Unitary Democrats CDU / APU / PCP			Left Bloc BE / UDP			LIVRE L			Socialists PS / FRS			People Animals Nature PAN			Democratic Renewal PRD			Social Democrats PSD / PàF / AD / PPD			Liberals IL			CDS – People's CDS–PP / CDS			Chega CH / PPV/CDC / PPV		
Election	Votes	%	Seats	Votes	%	Seats	Votes	%	Seats	Votes	%	Seats	Votes	%	Seats	Votes	%	Seats	Votes	%	Seats	Votes	%	Seats	Votes	%	Seats	Votes	%	Seats
2025	5,471	2.13%	0	5,100	1.98%	0	9,299	3.62%	0	50,329	19.59%	2	3,104	1.21%	0				98,249	38.24%	5	15,971	6.22%	0				61,180	23.81%	3
2024	6,625	2.50%	0	11,748	4.43%	0	7,212	2.72%	0	61,561	23.23%	3	4,655	1.76%	0				96,231	36.32%	5	15,498	5.85%	0				53,820	20.31%	2
2022	7,340	3.20%	0	10,709	4.67%	0	2,469	1.08%	0	84,253	36.74%	5	3,090	1.35%	0				81,827	35.68%	4	12,400	5.41%	0	4,834	2.11%	0	18,918	8.25%	1
2019	9,434	4.58%	0	20,572	9.99%	1	2,017	0.98%	0	68,067	33.04%	4	6,313	3.06%	0				73,311	35.59%	5	2,023	0.98%	0	11,616	5.64%	0	3,259	1.58%	0
2015	12,070	5.35%	0	22,946	10.17%	1	1,780	0.79%	0	58,878	26.10%	3	2,884	1.28%	0				114,829	50.89%	6									
2011	12,351	5.23%	0	13,351	5.65%	0				51,518	21.81%	3	3,029	1.28%	0				116,941	49.50%	6				31,821	13.47%	1	551	0.23%	0
2009	12,643	5.35%	0	23,418	9.92%	1				74,294	31.47%	4							86,195	36.51%	4				30,980	13.12%	1	632	0.27%	0
2005	11,423	4.75%	0	13,788	5.74%	0				88,623	36.89%	4							99,244	41.31%	5				22,043	9.17%	1			
2002	9,801	4.20%	0	5,289	2.27%	0				70,339	30.15%	3							121,140	51.93%	6				23,460	10.06%	1			
1999	12,357	5.42%	0	3,848	1.69%	0				85,593	37.57%	4							99,192	43.54%	5				23,099	10.14%	1			
1995	11,087	4.64%	0	1,126	0.47%	0				89,771	37.54%	4							105,969	44.32%	5				27,863	11.65%	1			
1991	10,742	4.58%	0							55,442	23.65%	3				1,478	0.63%	0	147,279	62.82%	7				11,527	4.92%	0			
1987	14,312	6.07%	0	1,297	0.55%	0				45,277	19.21%	2				7,308	3.10%	0	146,879	62.32%	9				14,608	6.20%	0			
1985	19,038	8.14%	1	2,225	0.95%	0				47,181	20.16%	2				36,830	15.74%	2	93,193	39.82%	5				29,332	12.53%	1			
1983	22,572	9.77%	1	1,590	0.69%	0				78,041	33.77%	4							84,862	36.72%	4				38,556	16.68%	2			
1980	24,460	9.96%	1	2,618	1.07%	0				57,117	23.26%	3							150,353	61.24%	7									
1979	27,561	11.19%	1	3,789	1.54%	0				58,955	23.93%	3							142,731	57.93%	7									
1976	16,226	7.75%	1	2,136	1.02%	0				69,236	33.07%	4							69,457	33.18%	4				43,213	20.64%	2			

(Figures in italics represent alliances.)

=== Detailed ===
==== 2020s ====
===== 2025 =====
Results of the 2025 legislative election held on 18 May 2025:

Party		Votes	%	Seats
Democratic Alliance	AD	98,249	38.24%	5
Chega	CH	61,180	23.81%	3
Socialist Party	PS	50,329	19.59%	2
Liberal Initiative	IL	15,971	6.22%	0
LIVRE	L	9,299	3.62%	0
National Democratic Alternative	ADN	5,746	2.24%	0
Unitary Democratic Coalition	CDU	5,471	2.13%	0
Left Bloc	BE	5,100	1.98%	0
People Animals Nature	PAN	3,104	1.21%	0
New Right	ND	723	0.28%	0
React, Include, Recycle	RIR	587	0.23%	0
Volt Portugal	Volt	483	0.19%	0
Ergue-te	E	368	0.14%	0
People's Monarchist Party	PPM	323	0.13%	0
Valid votes		256,933	100.00%	10
Blank votes		4,976	1.88%	
Rejected votes – other		3,165	1.19%	
Total polled		265,074	64.34%	
Registered electors		411,995		

The following candidates were elected:: Sofia Carreira (AD); Ricardo Carvalho (AD); Eurico Brilhante Dias (PS); Luís Paulo Fernandes (CH); Cristina Vieira Henriques (CH); Margarida Balseiro Lopes (AD); Catarina Louro (PS); Hugo Patrício Oliveira (AD); Gabriel Mithá Ribeiro (CH); and João Antunes Santos (AD).

===== 2024 =====
Results of the 2024 legislative election held on 10 March 2024:

Party		Votes	%	Seats
Democratic Alliance	AD	96,231	36.32%	5
Socialist Party	PS	61,561	23.23%	3
Chega	CH	53,820	20.31%	2
Liberal Initiative	IL	15,498	5.85%	0
Left Bloc	BE	11,748	4.43%	0
LIVRE	L	7,212	2.72%	0
Unitary Democratic Coalition	CDU	6,625	2.50%	0
People Animals Nature	PAN	4,655	1.76%	0
National Democratic Alternative	ADN	4,555	1.72%	0
React, Include, Recycle	RIR	1,136	0.43%	0
New Right	ND	739	0.28%	0
Volt Portugal	Volt	553	0.21%	0
Ergue-te	E	340	0.13%	0
Alternative 21 (Earth Party and Alliance)	PT-A	305	0.12%	0
Valid votes		264,978	100.00%	10
Blank votes		5,094	1.86%	
Rejected votes – other		3,507	1.28%	
Total polled		273,579	66.37%	
Registered electors		412,184		

The following candidates were elected: Ana Sofia Antunes (PS); Sofia Carreira (AD); Ricardo Carvalho (AD); Walter Chicharro (PS); Eurico Brilhante Dias (PS); Telmo Faria (AD); Luís Paulo Fernandes (CH); Hugo Patrício Oliveira (AD); Gabriel Mithá Ribeiro (CH); and João Antunes Santos (AD).

===== 2022 =====
Results of the 2022 legislative election held on 30 January 2022:

Party		Votes	%	Seats
Socialist Party	PS	84,253	36.74%	5
Social Democratic Party	PSD	81,827	35.68%	4
Chega	CH	18,918	8.25%	1
Liberal Initiative	IL	12,400	5.41%	0
Left Bloc	BE	10,709	4.67%	0
Unitary Democratic Coalition	CDU	7,340	3.20%	0
CDS – People's Party	CDS–PP	4,834	2.11%	0
People Animals Nature	PAN	3,090	1.35%	0
LIVRE	L	2,469	1.08%	0
React, Include, Recycle	RIR	1,199	0.52%	0
National Democratic Alternative	ADN	783	0.34%	0
We, the Citizens!	NC	376	0.16%	0
Earth Party	PT	355	0.15%	0
Socialist Alternative Movement	MAS	265	0.12%	0
Volt Portugal	Volt	209	0.09%	0
Ergue-te	E	173	0.08%	0
Portuguese Labour Party	PTP	137	0.06%	0
Valid votes		229,337	100.00%	10
Blank votes		3,801	1.61%	
Rejected votes – other		2,690	1.14%	
Total polled		235,828	57.09%	
Registered electors		413,063		

The following candidates were elected: Catarina Sarmento e Castro (PS); Eurico Brilhante Dias (PS); Salvador Formiga (PS); João Marques (PSD); Hugo Patrício Oliveira (PSD); Paulo Mota Pinto (PSD); Gabriel Mithá Ribeiro (CH); António Sales (PS); Olga Silvestre (PSD); and Sara Velez (PS).

==== 2010s ====
===== 2019 =====
Results of the 2019 legislative election held on 6 October 2019:

Party		Votes	%	Seats
Social Democratic Party	PSD	73,311	35.59%	5
Socialist Party	PS	68,067	33.04%	4
Left Bloc	BE	20,572	9.99%	1
CDS – People's Party	CDS–PP	11,616	5.64%	0
Unitary Democratic Coalition	CDU	9,434	4.58%	0
People Animals Nature	PAN	6,313	3.06%	0
Chega	CH	3,259	1.58%	0
Alliance	A	2,118	1.03%	0
Liberal Initiative	IL	2,023	0.98%	0
LIVRE	L	2,017	0.98%	0
React, Include, Recycle	RIR	1,615	0.78%	0
Portuguese Workers' Communist Party	PCTP	1,595	0.77%	0
Earth Party	PT	636	0.31%	0
National Renewal Party	PNR	610	0.30%	0
We, the Citizens!	NC	574	0.28%	0
Democratic Republican Party	PDR	537	0.26%	0
People's Monarchist Party	PPM	477	0.23%	0
United Party of Retirees and Pensioners	PURP	477	0.23%	0
Portuguese Labour Party	PTP	373	0.18%	0
Together for the People	JPP	213	0.10%	0
Socialist Alternative Movement	MAS	164	0.08%	0
Valid votes		206,001	100.00%	10
Blank votes		8,000	3.65%	
Rejected votes – other		4,995	2.28%	
Total polled		218,996	53.82%	
Registered electors		406,906		

The following candidates were elected: Raul Miguel de Castro (PS); Margarida Balseiro Lopes (PSD); João Marques (PSD); Hugo Patrício Oliveira (PSD); Elza Pais (PS); João Paulo Pedrosa (PS); Pedro Roque (PSD); António Sales (PS); Olga Silvestre (PSD); and Ricardo Vicente (BE).

===== 2015 =====
Results of the 2015 legislative election held on 4 October 2015:

Party		Votes	%	Seats
Portugal Ahead	PàF	114,829	50.89%	6
Socialist Party	PS	58,878	26.10%	3
Left Bloc	BE	22,946	10.17%	1
Unitary Democratic Coalition	CDU	12,070	5.35%	0
Democratic Republican Party	PDR	4,046	1.79%	0
People Animals Nature	PAN	2,884	1.28%	0
Portuguese Workers' Communist Party	PCTP	2,493	1.10%	0
LIVRE	L	1,780	0.79%	0
The Earth Party Movement	MPT	1,186	0.53%	0
National Renewal Party	PNR	1,079	0.48%	0
ACT! (Portuguese Labour Party and Socialist Alternative Movement)	AGIR	914	0.41%	0
We, the Citizens!	NC	831	0.37%	0
People's Monarchist Party	PPM	706	0.31%	0
United Party of Retirees and Pensioners	PURP	616	0.27%	0
Together for the People	JPP	369	0.16%	0
Valid votes		225,627	100.00%	10
Blank votes		6,883	2.90%	
Rejected votes – other		4,679	1.97%	
Total polled		237,189	56.14%	
Registered electors		422,474		

The following candidates were elected: Assunção Cristas (PàF); Feliciano Barreiras Duarte (PàF); Margarida Balseiro Lopes (PàF); Margarida Marques (PS); José Miguel Medeiros (PS); Teresa Morais (PàF); Pedro Pimpão (PàF); António Sales (PS); José António Silva (PàF); and Heitor de Sousa (BE).

===== 2011 =====
Results of the 2011 legislative election held on 5 June 2011:

Party		Votes	%	Seats
Social Democratic Party	PSD	116,941	49.50%	6
Socialist Party	PS	51,518	21.81%	3
CDS – People's Party	CDS–PP	31,821	13.47%	1
Left Bloc	BE	13,351	5.65%	0
Unitary Democratic Coalition	CDU	12,351	5.23%	0
Party for Animals and Nature	PAN	3,029	1.28%	0
Portuguese Workers' Communist Party	PCTP	2,502	1.06%	0
Hope for Portugal Movement	MEP	1,084	0.46%	0
The Earth Party Movement	MPT	977	0.41%	0
Portuguese Labour Party	PTP	633	0.27%	0
National Renewal Party	PNR	595	0.25%	0
Pro-Life Party	PPV	551	0.23%	0
People's Monarchist Party	PPM	453	0.19%	0
Workers' Party of Socialist Unity	POUS	445	0.19%	0
Valid votes		236,251	100.00%	10
Blank votes		8,597	3.46%	
Rejected votes – other		3,906	1.57%	
Total polled		248,754	58.55%	
Registered electors		424,870		

The following candidates were elected: Assunção Cristas (CDS-PP); Feliciano Barreiras Duarte (PSD); Basílio Horta (PS); Odete João (PS); Fernando Marqués (PSD); Teresa Morais (PSD); João Paulo Pedrosa (PS); Maria Conceição Pereira (PSD); Pedro Pimpão (PSD); and Paulo Batista Santos (PSD).

==== 2000s ====
===== 2009 =====
Results of the 2009 legislative election held on 27 September 2009:

Party		Votes	%	Seats
Social Democratic Party	PSD	86,195	36.51%	4
Socialist Party	PS	74,294	31.47%	4
CDS – People's Party	CDS–PP	30,980	13.12%	1
Left Bloc	BE	23,418	9.92%	1
Unitary Democratic Coalition	CDU	12,643	5.35%	0
Portuguese Workers' Communist Party	PCTP	1,941	0.82%	0
Hope for Portugal Movement	MEP	1,194	0.51%	0
Merit and Society Movement	MMS	908	0.38%	0
People's Monarchist Party	PPM	893	0.38%	0
New Democracy Party	ND	749	0.32%	0
Workers' Party of Socialist Unity	POUS	667	0.28%	0
The Earth Party Movement and Humanist Party	MPT-PH	636	0.27%	0
Pro-Life Party	PPV	632	0.27%	0
Portuguese Labour Party	PTP	516	0.22%	0
National Renewal Party	PNR	437	0.19%	0
Valid votes		236,103	100.00%	10
Blank votes		6,970	2.82%	
Rejected votes – other		3,757	1.52%	
Total polled		246,830	58.60%	
Registered electors		421,183		

The following candidates were elected: Luís Amado (PS); Assunção Cristas (CDS-PP); Odete João (PS); Fernando Marqués (PSD); José Miguel Medeiros (PS); Teresa Morais (PSD); João Paulo Pedrosa (PS); Maria Conceição Pereira (PSD); Paulo Batista Santos (PSD); and Heitor de Sousa (BE).

===== 2005 =====
Results of the 2005 legislative election held on 20 February 2005:

Party		Votes	%	Seats
Social Democratic Party	PSD	99,244	41.31%	5
Socialist Party	PS	88,623	36.89%	4
CDS – People's Party	CDS–PP	22,043	9.17%	1
Left Bloc	BE	13,788	5.74%	0
Unitary Democratic Coalition	CDU	11,423	4.75%	0
New Democracy Party	ND	1,867	0.78%	0
Portuguese Workers' Communist Party	PCTP	1,485	0.62%	0
Humanist Party	PH	747	0.31%	0
Workers' Party of Socialist Unity	POUS	574	0.24%	0
National Renewal Party	PNR	465	0.19%	0
Valid votes		240,259	100.00%	10
Blank votes		5,807	2.33%	
Rejected votes – other		3,118	1.25%	
Total polled		249,184	64.86%	
Registered electors		384,186		

The following candidates were elected: Luís Pais Antunes (PSD); Teresa Caeiro (CDS=PP); Osvaldo de Castro (PS); Alberto Costa (PS); Mário Santos David (PSD); Feliciano Barreiras Duarte (PSD); Odete João (PS); José Miguel Medeiros (PS); Maria Ofélia Moleiro (PSD); and Carlos Poço (PSD).

===== 2002 =====
Results of the 2002 legislative election held on 17 March 2002:

Party		Votes	%	Seats
Social Democratic Party	PSD	121,140	51.93%	6
Socialist Party	PS	70,339	30.15%	3
CDS – People's Party	CDS–PP	23,460	10.06%	1
Unitary Democratic Coalition	CDU	9,801	4.20%	0
Left Bloc	BE	5,289	2.27%	0
Portuguese Workers' Communist Party	PCTP	997	0.43%	0
The Earth Party Movement	MPT	664	0.28%	0
People's Monarchist Party	PPM	656	0.28%	0
Workers' Party of Socialist Unity	POUS	516	0.22%	0
Humanist Party	PH	415	0.18%	0
Valid votes		233,277	100.00%	10
Blank votes		2,982	1.25%	
Rejected votes – other		2,380	1.00%	
Total polled		238,639	62.81%	
Registered electors		379,949		

The following candidates were elected: Ferreira do Amaral (PSD); Maria Celeste Cardona (CDS-PP); Graça Proença de Carvalho (PSD); Osvaldo de Castro (PS); António Costa (PS); Feliciano Barreiras Duarte (PSD); José Miguel Medeiros (PS); Maria Ofélia Moleiro (PSD); Paulo Batista Santos (PSD); and José António Silva (PSD).

==== 1990s ====
===== 1999 =====
Results of the 1999 legislative election held on 10 October 1999:

Party		Votes	%	Seats
Social Democratic Party	PSD	99,192	43.54%	5
Socialist Party	PS	85,593	37.57%	4
CDS – People's Party	CDS–PP	23,099	10.14%	1
Unitary Democratic Coalition	CDU	12,357	5.42%	0
Left Bloc	BE	3,848	1.69%	0
Portuguese Workers' Communist Party	PCTP	1,724	0.76%	0
The Earth Party Movement	MPT	896	0.39%	0
National Solidarity Party	PSN	618	0.27%	0
Workers' Party of Socialist Unity	POUS	469	0.21%	0
Valid votes		227,796	100.00%	10
Blank votes		2,834	1.22%	
Rejected votes – other		2,233	0.96%	
Total polled		232,863	61.82%	
Registered electors		376,706		

The following candidates were elected: Ferreira do Amaral (PSD); Carlos Ascenso André (PS); Maria Celeste Cardona (CDS-PP); Osvaldo de Castro (PS); Fernando Costa (PSD); Feliciano Barreiras Duarte (PSD); Maria Ofélia Moleiro (PSD); Eduardo Ferro Rodrigues (PS); José António Silva (PSD); and Isabel Vigia (PS).

===== 1995 =====
Results of the 1995 legislative election held on 1 October 1995:

Party		Votes	%	Seats
Social Democratic Party	PSD	105,969	44.32%	5
Socialist Party	PS	89,771	37.54%	4
CDS – People's Party	CDS–PP	27,863	11.65%	1
Unitary Democratic Coalition	CDU	11,087	4.64%	0
Portuguese Workers' Communist Party	PCTP	1,451	0.61%	0
Revolutionary Socialist Party	PSR	1,186	0.50%	0
Popular Democratic Union	UDP	1,126	0.47%	0
Unity Movement for Workers	MUT	651	0.27%	0
Valid votes		239,104	100.00%	10
Blank votes		2,465	1.01%	
Rejected votes – other		2,959	1.21%	
Total polled		244,528	65.34%	
Registered electors		374,257		

The following candidates were elected: Osvaldo de Castro (PS); Gonçalo Ribeiro da Costa (CDS=PP); Maria Luisa Ferreira (PSD); Nunes Liberato (PSD); Laborinho Lúcio (PSD); Silva Marques (PSD); Henrique Neto (PS); Arnaldo Homem Rebelo (PS); João Poças Santos (PSD); and Rui Vieira (PS).

===== 1991 =====
Results of the 1991 legislative election held on 6 October 1991:

Party		Votes	%	Seats
Social Democratic Party	PSD	147,279	62.82%	7
Socialist Party	PS	55,442	23.65%	3
Social Democratic Centre Party	CDS	11,527	4.92%	0
Unitary Democratic Coalition	CDU	10,742	4.58%	0
National Solidarity Party	PSN	3,467	1.48%	0
Revolutionary Socialist Party	PSR	1,841	0.79%	0
Democratic Renewal Party	PRD	1,478	0.63%	0
Portuguese Workers' Communist Party	PCTP	1,217	0.52%	0
People's Monarchist Party	PPM	877	0.37%	0
Democratic Party of the Atlantic	PDA	578	0.25%	0
Valid votes		234,448	100.00%	10
Blank votes		2,362	0.98%	
Rejected votes – other		3,895	1.62%	
Total polled		240,705	67.11%	
Registered electors		358,670		

The following candidates were elected: Arlindo de Carvalho (PSD); Belarmino Correia (PSD); Fernando Costa (PSD); Vítor Crespo (PSD); Elisa Damião (PS); Júlio Henriques (PS); Laborinho Lúcio (PSD); Silva Marques (PSD); João Poças Santos (PSD); and Rui Vieira (PS).

==== 1980s ====
===== 1987 =====
Results of the 1987 legislative election held on 19 July 1987:

Party		Votes	%	Seats
Social Democratic Party	PSD	146,879	62.32%	9
Socialist Party	PS	45,277	19.21%	2
Social Democratic Centre Party	CDS	14,608	6.20%	0
Unitary Democratic Coalition	CDU	14,312	6.07%	0
Democratic Renewal Party	PRD	7,308	3.10%	0
Popular Democratic Union	UDP	1,297	0.55%	0
Christian Democratic Party	PDC	1,057	0.45%	0
Communist Party (Reconstructed)	PC(R)	979	0.42%	0
Revolutionary Socialist Party	PSR	961	0.41%	0
Workers' Party of Socialist Unity	POUS	959	0.41%	0
Portuguese Democratic Movement	MDP	841	0.36%	0
Portuguese Workers' Communist Party	PCTP	656	0.28%	0
People's Monarchist Party	PPM	560	0.24%	0
Valid votes		235,694	100.00%	11
Blank votes		2,317	0.96%	
Rejected votes – other		3,701	1.53%	
Total polled		241,712	72.23%	
Registered electors		334,650		

The following candidates were elected: Belarmino Correia (PSD); Torres Couto (PS); Vítor Crespo (PSD); Maria Luisa Ferreira (PSD); Reinaldo Gomes (PSD); Silva Marques (PSD); Licínio Moreira (PSD); Lalanda Ribeiro (PSD); João Poças Santos (PSD); Ercília Ribeiro da Silva (PSD); and Rui Vieira (PS).

===== 1985 =====
Results of the 1985 legislative election held on 6 October 1985:

Party		Votes	%	Seats
Social Democratic Party	PSD	93,193	39.82%	5
Socialist Party	PS	47,181	20.16%	2
Democratic Renewal Party	PRD	36,830	15.74%	2
Social Democratic Centre Party	CDS	29,332	12.53%	1
United People Alliance	APU	19,038	8.14%	1
Christian Democratic Party	PDC	3,145	1.34%	0
Popular Democratic Union	UDP	2,225	0.95%	0
Workers' Party of Socialist Unity	POUS	1,079	0.46%	0
Revolutionary Socialist Party	PSR	1,038	0.44%	0
Portuguese Workers' Communist Party	PCTP	502	0.21%	0
Communist Party (Reconstructed)	PC(R)	460	0.20%	0
Valid votes		234,023	100.00%	11
Blank votes		2,279	0.94%	
Rejected votes – other		5,090	2.11%	
Total polled		241,392	73.22%	
Registered electors		329,661		

The following candidates were elected: Belarmino Correia (PSD); Miguel Anacoreta Correia (CDS); Reinaldo Gomes (PSD); António Marques (PRD); Silva Marques (PSD); Carlos Melancia (PS); Licínio Moreira (PSD); Mário Raposo (PSD); Joaquim Gomes dos Santos (APU); José Alberto Seabra (PRD); and Rui Vieira (PS).

===== 1983 =====
Results of the 1983 legislative election held on 25 April 1983:

Party		Votes	%	Seats
Social Democratic Party	PSD	84,862	36.72%	4
Socialist Party	PS	78,041	33.77%	4
Social Democratic Centre Party	CDS	38,556	16.68%	2
United People Alliance	APU	22,572	9.77%	1
Christian Democratic Party	PDC	1,881	0.81%	0
Popular Democratic Union	UDP	1,590	0.69%	0
Revolutionary Socialist Party	PSR	1,011	0.44%	0
Workers' Party of Socialist Unity	POUS	877	0.38%	0
Portuguese Workers' Communist Party	PCTP	741	0.32%	0
Socialist Workers League	LST	724	0.31%	0
Portuguese Marxist–Leninist Communist Organization	OCMLP	271	0.12%	0
Valid votes		231,126	100.00%	11
Blank votes		1,816	0.76%	
Rejected votes – other		5,427	2.28%	
Total polled		238,369	77.33%	
Registered electors		308,231		

The following candidates were elected: Miguel Anacoreta Correia (CDS); Fernando Costa (PSD); Vítor Crespo (PSD); João Eliseu (PS); Leonel Fadigas (PS); Francisco Menezes Falcão (CDS); Reinaldo Gomes (PSD); Almerindo Marques (PS); Silva Marques (PSD); Hermínio Oliveira (PS); and Joaquim Gomes dos Santos (APU).

===== 1980 =====
Results of the 1980 legislative election held on 5 October 1980:

Party		Votes	%	Seats
Democratic Alliance	AD	150,353	61.24%	7
Republican and Socialist Front	FRS	57,117	23.26%	3
United People Alliance	APU	24,460	9.96%	1
Workers' Party of Socialist Unity	POUS	4,895	1.99%	0
Popular Democratic Union	UDP	2,618	1.07%	0
Labour Party	PT	1,720	0.70%	0
Portuguese Workers' Communist Party	PCTP	1,351	0.55%	0
Revolutionary Socialist Party	PSR	1,221	0.50%	0
Christian Democratic Party, Independent Movement for the National Reconstruction / Party of the Portuguese Right and National Front	PDC- MIRN/ PDP- FN	909	0.37%	0
Democratic Party of the Atlantic	PDA	880	0.36%	0
Valid votes		245,524	100.00%	11
Blank votes		1,392	0.55%	
Rejected votes – other		4,360	1.74%	
Total polled		251,276	83.77%	
Registered electors		299,972		

The following candidates were elected: Alfredo Barroso (FRS); Fernando Costa (AD); Vítor Crespo (AD); Cardoso e Cunha (AD); Francisco de Oliveira Dias (AD); Francisco Menezes Falcão (AD); Reinaldo Gomes (AD); António Maldonado Gonelha (FRS); Silva Marques (AD); Guilherme Santos (FRS); and Joaquim Gomes dos Santos (APU).

==== 1970s ====
===== 1979 =====
Results of the 1979 legislative election held on 2 December 1979:

Party		Votes	%	Seats
Democratic Alliance	AD	142,731	57.93%	7
Socialist Party	PS	58,955	23.93%	3
United People Alliance	APU	27,561	11.19%	1
Christian Democratic Party	PDC	4,674	1.90%	0
Popular Democratic Union	UDP	3,789	1.54%	0
Portuguese Workers' Communist Party	PCTP	2,641	1.07%	0
Workers' Party of Socialist Unity	POUS	2,621	1.06%	0
Left-wing Union for the Socialist Democracy	UEDS	1,760	0.71%	0
Revolutionary Socialist Party	PSR	1,663	0.67%	0
Valid votes		246,395	100.00%	11
Blank votes		1,968	0.77%	
Rejected votes – other		5,750	2.26%	
Total polled		254,113	86.56%	
Registered electors		293,564		

The following candidates were elected: Luís Coimbra (AD); Fernando Costa (AD); Vítor Crespo (AD); Cardoso e Cunha (AD); Francisco de Oliveira Dias (AD); Reinaldo Gomes (AD); António Maldonado Gonelha (PS); Rui Manuel Lemos (AD); Rui Mateus (PS); Guilherme Santos (PS); and Joaquim Gomes dos Santos (APU).

===== 1976 =====
Results of the 1976 legislative election held on 25 April 1976:

Party		Votes	%	Seats
Democratic People's Party	PPD	69,457	33.18%	4
Socialist Party	PS	69,236	33.07%	4
Social Democratic Centre Party	CDS	43,213	20.64%	2
Portuguese Communist Party	PCP	16,226	7.75%	1
Popular Democratic Union	UDP	2,136	1.02%	0
People's Socialist Front	FSP	2,094	1.00%	0
People's Monarchist Party	PPM	1,633	0.78%	0
Christian Democratic Party	PDC	1,448	0.69%	0
Re-Organized Movement of the Party of the Proletariat	MRPP	1,169	0.56%	0
Movement of Socialist Left	MES	1,009	0.48%	0
Internationalist Communist League	LCI	814	0.39%	0
Worker–Peasant Alliance	AOC	514	0.25%	0
Communist Party of Portugal (Marxist–Leninist)	PCP(ML)	399	0.19%	0
Valid votes		209,348	100.00%	11
Rejected votes		13,404	6.02%	
Total polled		222,752	80.25%	
Registered electors		277,582		

The following candidates were elected: Fernando Costa (PPD); Rodolfo Crespo (PS); Francisco de Oliveira Dias (CDS); Vasco da Gama Fernandes (PS); João Manuel Ferreira (PPD); José Júnior (PPD); Telmo Neto (PS); Rui Pena (CDS); Walter Rosa (PS); Joaquim Gomes dos Santos (PCP); and Gonçalves Sapinho (PPD).
