= Bernardo Pessanha =

Portuguese politician (born 1983)

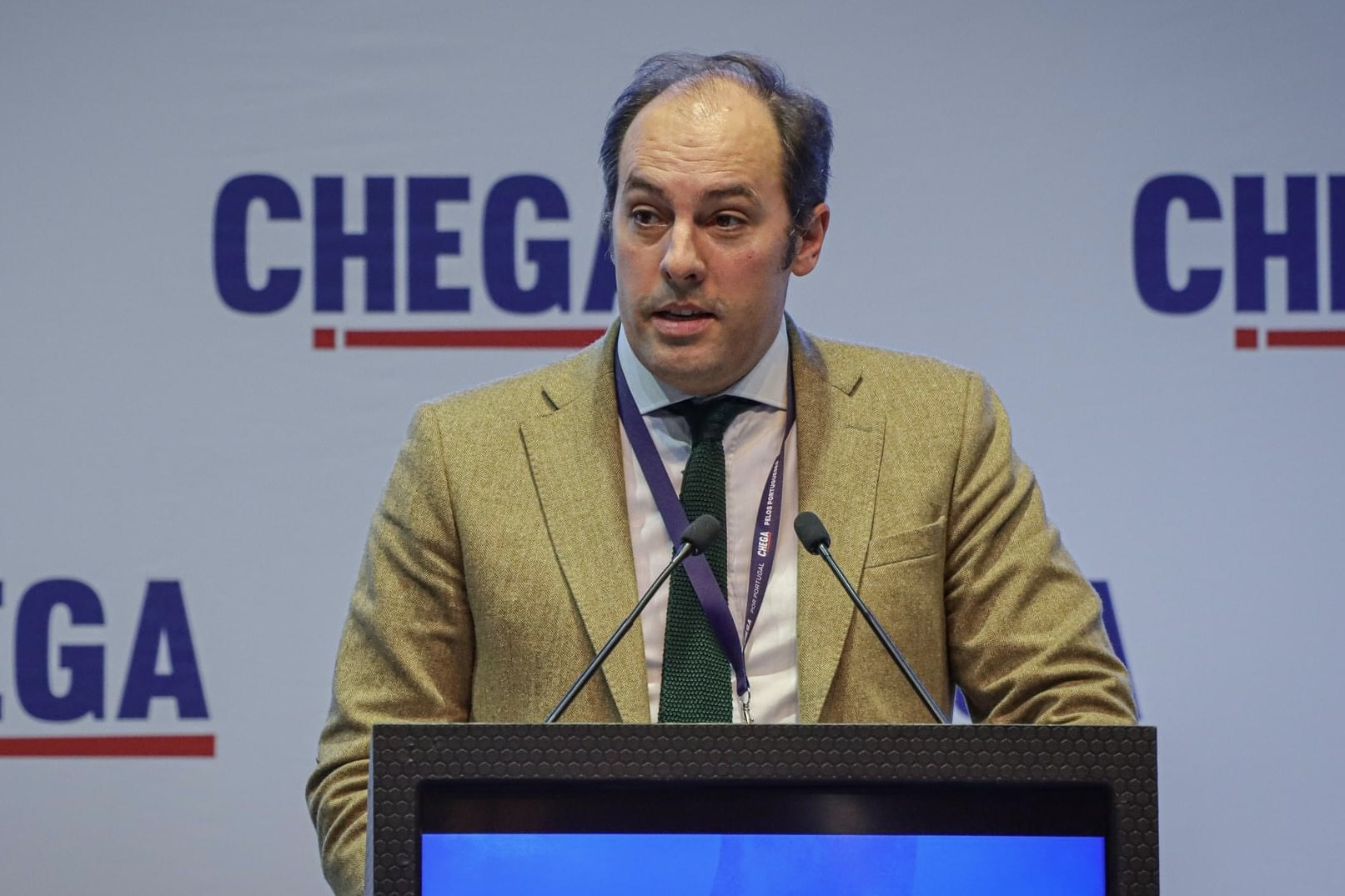
- Pessanha in 2024

Member of the Assembly of the Republic
- Incumbent
- Assumed office 26 March 2024
- Constituency: Viseu

Personal details
- Born: 17 January 1983 (age 43)
- Party: Chega

Bernardo Cappelle Homem Caldeira Pessanha (born 17 January 1983) is a Portuguese politician serving as a member of the Assembly of the Republic since 2024. He has served as president of the jurisdictional council of Chega since 2023. His first professional experience was in 2007 as a member of the content production team for the official website of the Portuguese Presidency of the Council of the European Union. He worked in the press office of the parliamentary group of Chega between 2022 and 2024.
