= Hélder Amaral =

Portuguese politician (born 1967)

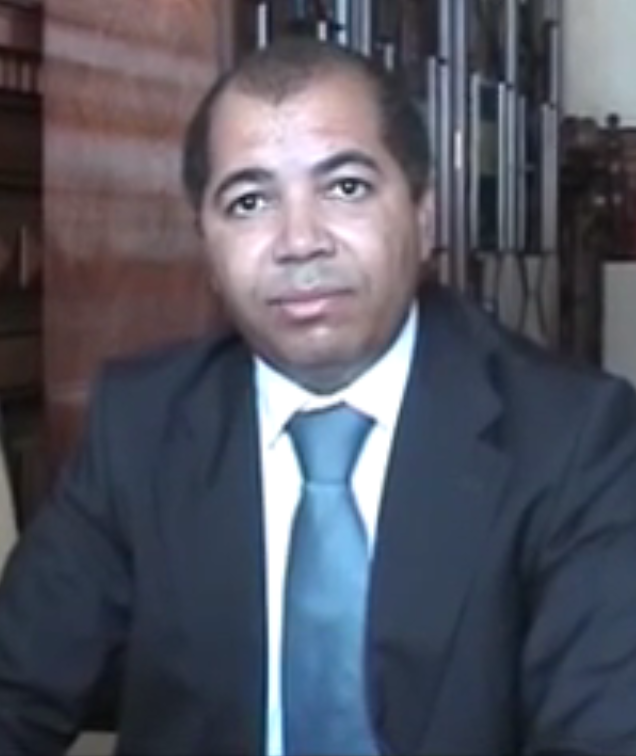
- Hélder Amaral in 2011

Member of the Assembly of the Republic
- In office 17 March 2002 – 6 October 2019
- Constituency: Viseu

Member of the Viseu Municipal Assembly
- In office 1 October 2017 – 26 September 2021

Member of the Viseu City Council
- In office 29 September 2013 – 1 October 2017

Personal details
- Born: José Hélder do Amaral; 8 June 1967 (age 59) Portuguese Angola
- Citizenship: Portugal; Angola
- Party: CDS – People's Party
- Spouse: Ana Cardoso
- Children: 2
- Education: Lusíada University of Lisbon (dropped out)

José Helder do Amaral (born 8 June 1967) is a Portuguese politician. Between 2002 and 2019, he was a member of the Assembly of the Republic for the Viseu constituency, elected on the lists of the CDS-PP, a party of which he is a member.
