= Europe (Assembly of the Republic constituency) =

Assembly of the Republic (Portugal) constituency

- Europa
- Constituency for the Assembly of the Republic
- Portuguese constituency of Europe
- Electorate: 948,062 (2025)

Current Constituency
- Created: 1976
- Seats: 2
- Deputies: List: José Dias Fernandes (CH); Carlos Alberto Gonçalves (PSD)

Europe (Portuguese: Europa) is one of the 22 multi-member constituencies of the Assembly of the Republic, the national legislature of Portugal. It consists of Portuguese citizens residing abroad, registered in Portuguese diplomatic posts in European countries. The constituency was established in 1976 when the Assembly of the Republic was established by the constitution following the restoration of democracy. The constituency is fixed at electing two of the 230 members of the Assembly of the Republic using the closed party-list proportional representation electoral system. At the 2025 legislative election it had 948,062 registered voters.

== Definition ==
For elections to the Assembly of the Republic, Portuguese law establishes two constituencies of Portuguese citizens residing abroad: the constituency of Europe, comprising voters registered in Portuguese diplomatic posts in European countries; and the constituency of Outside Europe, comprising voters registered in other posts. For this purpose, European countries include Armenia, Azerbaijan, Cyprus, Georgia, Russia and Turkey, but not Kazakhstan.

Each diplomatic post registers voters residing in its area of jurisdiction, which may include multiple countries and territories in different continents. As a result, as of 2025, the constituency of Europe also includes citizens residing in Lebanon, Syria, Tajikistan, Turkmenistan, Uzbekistan, and in dependent territories of European countries, except British Overseas Territories in the Caribbean and Oceania. Afghanistan was in the jurisdiction of the embassy in Turkey, in the constituency of Europe, for the 2022 election, but changed to the embassy in Pakistan, in the constituency of Outside Europe, for the 2024 election.

== Election results ==
The constituency of Europe elects two of the 230 members of the Assembly of the Republic using the closed party-list proportional representation electoral system. Seats are allocated using the D'Hondt method.

=== Summary ===
Election	Unitary Democrats CDU / APU / PCP			Left Bloc BE / UDP			Socialists PS			People Animals Nature PAN			Democratic Renewal PRD			Social Democrats PSD / PàF / AD / PPD			Liberals IL			CDS – People's CDS–PP / CDS			Chega CH / PPV/CDC / PPV		
Election	Votes	%	Seats	Votes	%	Seats	Votes	%	Seats	Votes	%	Seats	Votes	%	Seats	Votes	%	Seats	Votes	%	Seats	Votes	%	Seats	Votes	%	Seats
2025	2,214	1.28%	0	4,743	2.75%	0	34,582	20.03%	0	4,072	2.36%	0				37,411	21.67%	1	6,452	3.74%	0				72,010	41.71%	1
2024	2,363	1.65%	0	6,438	4.50%	0	38,063	26.62%	1	5,175	3.62%	0				33,351	23.33%	0	5,719	4.00%	0				42,975	30.06%	1
2022	1,409	1.86%	0	2,647	3.49%	0	36,086	47.54%	2	2,956	3.89%	0				16,404	21.61%	0	2,704	3.56%	0	1,156	1.52%	0	7,756	10.22%	0
2019	2,713	3.41%	0	6,106	7.68%	0	31,377	39.47%	1	5,296	6.66%	0				20,256	25.48%	1	874	1.10%	0	3,180	4.00%	0	833	1.05%	0
2015	811	6.73%	0	785	6.52%	0	4,082	33.89%	1	128	1.06%	0				5,340	44.33%	1									
2011	803	5.14%	0	602	3.85%	0	7,205	46.13%	1	192	1.23%	0				5,312	34.01%	1				994	6.36%	0			
2009	734	5.21%	0	796	5.65%	0	7,267	51.54%	1							3,998	28.35%	1				787	5.58%	0	12	0.09%	0
2005	973	4.48%	0	535	2.46%	0	12,728	58.58%	1							6,366	29.30%	1				794	3.65%	0			
2002	1,148	5.21%	0	250	1.14%	0	10,021	45.51%	1							8,801	39.97%	1				1,179	5.35%	0			
1999	1,351	5.72%	0	145	0.61%	0	14,277	60.49%	2							6,353	26.92%	0				829	3.51%	0			
1995	1,652	7.75%	0	79	0.37%	0	9,067	42.56%	1							8,740	41.02%	1				1,143	5.36%	0			
1991	2,311	7.99%	0				9,393	32.46%	1				141	0.49%	0	15,817	54.66%	1				894	3.09%	0			
1987	3,054	16.24%	0	144	0.77%	0	5,467	29.06%	1				944	5.02%	0	7,125	37.88%	1				1,278	6.79%	0			
1985	4,417	19.47%	0	203	0.89%	0	5,700	25.12%	1				1,664	7.33%	0	5,712	25.18%	1				4,074	17.96%	0			
1983	6,069	17.43%	0				11,939	34.28%	1							11,101	31.87%	1				3,955	11.36%	0			
1980	6,678	15.74%	0	604	1.42%	0	11,142	26.27%	1							21,757	51.29%	1									
1979	5,659	13.77%	0	1,391	3.38%	0	14,018	34.11%	1							16,154	39.31%	1									
1976	5,212	10.28%	0	407	0.80%	0	23,824	46.99%	1							16,644	32.83%	1				3,555	7.01%	0			

(Figures in italics represent alliances.)

=== Detailed ===
==== 2020s ====
===== 2025 =====
Results of the 2025 legislative election held on 18 May 2025:

Party		Votes	%	Seats
Chega	CH	72,010	41.71%	1
Democratic Alliance	AD	37,411	21.67%	1
Socialist Party	PS	34,582	20.03%	0
Liberal Initiative	IL	6,452	3.74%	0
LIVRE	L	5,626	3.26%	0
Left Bloc	BE	4,743	2.75%	0
People Animals Nature	PAN	4,072	2.36%	0
Unitary Democratic Coalition	CDU	2,214	1.28%	0
National Democratic Alternative	ADN	1,201	0.70%	0
Volt Portugal	Volt	945	0.55%	0
Portuguese Workers' Communist Party	PCTP	785	0.45%	0
Together for the People	JPP	551	0.32%	0
New Right	ND	504	0.29%	0
Liberal Social Party	PLS	442	0.26%	0
We, the Citizens!	NC	343	0.20%	0
React, Include, Recycle	RIR	329	0.19%	0
Ergue-te	E	252	0.15%	0
People's Monarchist Party	PPM	186	0.11%	0
Valid votes		172,648	100.00%	2
Blank votes		1,264	0.49%	
Rejected votes – other		82,872	32.27%	
Total polled		256,784	27.09%	
Registered electors		948,062		

The following candidates were elected: José Dias Fernandes (CH) and José Manuel Fernandes (AD).

===== 2024 =====
Results of the 2024 legislative election held on 10 March 2024:

Party		Votes	%	Seats
Chega	CH	42,975	30.06%	1
Socialist Party	PS	38,063	26.62%	1
Democratic Alliance	AD	33,351	23.33%	0
Left Bloc	BE	6,438	4.50%	0
Liberal Initiative	IL	5,719	4.00%	0
People Animals Nature	PAN	5,175	3.62%	0
LIVRE	L	4,091	2.86%	0
Unitary Democratic Coalition	CDU	2,363	1.65%	0
National Democratic Alternative	ADN	953	0.67%	0
Volt Portugal	Volt	761	0.53%	0
Portuguese Workers' Communist Party	PCTP	748	0.52%	0
Together for the People	JPP	560	0.39%	0
We, the Citizens!	NC	510	0.36%	0
New Right	ND	502	0.35%	0
React, Include, Recycle	RIR	452	0.32%	0
Ergue-te	E	182	0.13%	0
Alternative 21 (Earth Party and Alliance)	PT-A	120	0.08%	0
Valid votes		142,963	100.00%	2
Blank votes		1,381	0.58%	
Rejected votes – other		94,261	39.51%	
Total polled		238,605	25.46%	
Registered electors		937,311		

The following candidates were elected: José Dias Fernandes (CH) and Paulo Pisco (PS).

===== 2022 =====
The results of the 2022 legislative election held on 30 January 2022 in the constituency were annulled by the Constitutional Court due ballot papers without copies of voter IDs (which are therefore null and void) being mixed with ballots with voter IDs (which are valid votes) at around 150 polling stations. Results of the re-run held on 12 and 13 March 2022:

Party		Votes	%	Seats
Socialist Party	PS	36,069	32.98%	2
Social Democratic Party	PSD	16,391	14.99%	0
Chega	CH	7,756	7.09%	0
People Animals Nature	PAN	2,954	2.70%	0
Liberal Initiative	IL	2,700	2.47%	0
Left Bloc	BE	2,644	2.42%	0
LIVRE	L	1,579	1.44%	0
Unitary Democratic Coalition	CDU	1,409	1.29%	0
CDS – People's Party	CDS–PP	1,155	1.06%	0
Earth Party	PT	610	0.56%	0
Portuguese Workers' Communist Party	PCTP	522	0.48%	0
Volt Portugal	Volt	464	0.42%	0
React, Include, Recycle	RIR	389	0.36%	0
Portuguese Labour Party	PTP	377	0.34%	0
We, the Citizens!	NC	296	0.27%	0
National Democratic Alternative	ADN	262	0.24%	0
Socialist Alternative Movement	MAS	123	0.11%	0
Alliance	A	84	0.08%	0
Ergue-te	E	78	0.07%	0
Valid votes		75,862	100.00%	2
Blank votes		711	0.65%	
Rejected votes – other		32,777	30.46%	
Total polled		109,350	11.90%	
Registered electors		926,376		

The following candidates were elected: Nathalie Oliveira (PS) and Paulo Pisco (PS).

==== 2010s ====
===== 2019 =====
Results of the 2019 legislative election held on 6 October 2019:

Party		Votes	%	Seats
Socialist Party	PS	31,362	29.06%	1
Social Democratic Party	PSD	20,254	18.77%	1
Left Bloc	BE	6,106	5.66%	0
People Animals Nature	PAN	5,296	4.91%	0
CDS – People's Party	CDS–PP	3,179	2.95%	0
Unitary Democratic Coalition	CDU	2,712	2.51%	0
Portuguese Workers' Communist Party	PCTP	1,267	1.17%	0
LIVRE	L	1,166	1.08%	0
Earth Party	PT	1,012	0.94%	0
Chega	CH	913	0.85%	0
Liberal Initiative	IL	874	0.81%	0
National Renewal Party	PNR	810	0.75%	0
Democratic Republican Party	PDR	797	0.74%	0
We, the Citizens!	NC	688	0.64%	0
United Party of Retirees and Pensioners	PURP	672	0.62%	0
Alliance	A	558	0.52%	0
React, Include, Recycle	RIR	553	0.51%	0
Portuguese Labour Party	PTP	493	0.46%	0
Together for the People	JPP	409	0.38%	0
People's Monarchist Party	PPM	254	0.24%	0
Socialist Alternative Movement	MAS	173	0.16%	0
Valid votes		79,548	100.00%	2
Blank votes		1,665	1.54%	
Rejected votes – other		26,706	24.75%	
Total polled		107,919	12.05%	
Registered electors		895,590		

The following candidates were elected: Carlos Alberto Gonçalves (PSD) and Paulo Pisco (PS).

===== 2015 =====
Results of the 2015 legislative election held on 4 October 2015:

Party		Votes	%	Seats
Portugal Ahead	PàF	5,340	44.33%	1
Socialist Party	PS	4,082	33.89%	1
Unitary Democratic Coalition	CDU	811	6.73%	0
Left Bloc	BE	785	6.52%	0
LIVRE	L	249	2.07%	0
Democratic Republican Party	PDR	169	1.40%	0
People Animals Nature	PAN	128	1.06%	0
Portuguese Workers' Communist Party	PCTP	98	0.81%	0
United Party of Retirees and Pensioners	PURP	96	0.80%	0
The Earth Party Movement	MPT	82	0.68%	0
We, the Citizens!	NC	69	0.57%	0
National Renewal Party	PNR	45	0.37%	0
People's Monarchist Party	PPM	40	0.33%	0
Together for the People	JPP	28	0.23%	0
ACT! (Portuguese Labour Party and Socialist Alternative Movement)	AGIR	23	0.19%	0
Valid votes		12,045	100.00%	2
Blank votes		105	0.76%	
Rejected votes – other		1,641	11.90%	
Total polled		13,791	17.60%	
Registered electors		78,342		

The following candidates were elected: Carlos Alberto Gonçalves (PàF) and Paulo Pisco (PS).

===== 2011 =====
Results of the 2011 legislative election held on 5 June 2011:

Party		Votes	%	Seats
Socialist Party	PS	7,205	46.13%	1
Social Democratic Party	PSD	5,312	34.01%	1
CDS – People's Party	CDS–PP	994	6.36%	0
Unitary Democratic Coalition	CDU	803	5.14%	0
Left Bloc	BE	602	3.85%	0
Party for Animals and Nature	PAN	192	1.23%	0
Portuguese Workers' Communist Party	PCTP	132	0.85%	0
The Earth Party Movement	MPT	101	0.65%	0
Portuguese Labour Party	PTP	83	0.53%	0
Hope for Portugal Movement	MEP	55	0.35%	0
People's Monarchist Party	PPM	50	0.32%	0
National Renewal Party	PNR	48	0.31%	0
New Democracy Party	ND	24	0.15%	0
Humanist Party	PH	19	0.12%	0
Valid votes		15,620	100.00%	2
Blank votes		161	0.89%	
Rejected votes – other		2,410	13.25%	
Total polled		18,191	24.24%	
Registered electors		75,053		

The following candidates were elected: Carlos Alberto Gonçalves (PSD) and Paulo Pisco (PS).

==== 2000s ====
===== 2009 =====
Results of the 2009 legislative election held on 27 September 2009:

Party		Votes	%	Seats
Socialist Party	PS	7,267	51.54%	1
Social Democratic Party	PSD	3,998	28.35%	1
Left Bloc	BE	796	5.65%	0
CDS – People's Party	CDS–PP	787	5.58%	0
Unitary Democratic Coalition	CDU	734	5.21%	0
The Earth Party Movement and Humanist Party	MPT-PH	195	1.38%	0
Portuguese Workers' Communist Party	PCTP	131	0.93%	0
Hope for Portugal Movement	MEP	71	0.50%	0
People's Monarchist Party	PPM	48	0.34%	0
New Democracy Party	ND	36	0.26%	0
Merit and Society Movement	MMS	25	0.18%	0
Pro-Life Party	PPV	12	0.09%	0
Valid votes		14,100	100.00%	2
Blank votes		117	0.70%	
Rejected votes – other		2,563	15.27%	
Total polled		16,780	23.13%	
Registered electors		72,535		

The following candidates were elected: Carlos Alberto Gonçalves (PSD) and Paulo Pisco (PS).

===== 2005 =====
Results of the 2005 legislative election held on 20 February 2005:

Party		Votes	%	Seats
Socialist Party	PS	12,728	58.58%	1
Social Democratic Party	PSD	6,366	29.30%	1
Unitary Democratic Coalition	CDU	973	4.48%	0
CDS – People's Party	CDS–PP	794	3.65%	0
Left Bloc	BE	535	2.46%	0
Portuguese Workers' Communist Party	PCTP	148	0.68%	0
New Democracy Party	ND	124	0.57%	0
National Renewal Party	PNR	60	0.28%	0
Valid votes		21,728	100.00%	2
Blank votes		104	0.44%	
Rejected votes – other		1,718	7.30%	
Total polled		23,550	31.88%	
Registered electors		73,879		

The following candidates were elected: Maria Carrilho (PS) and Carlos Alberto Gonçalves (PSD).

===== 2002 =====
Results of the 2002 legislative election held on 17 March 2002:

Party		Votes	%	Seats
Socialist Party	PS	10,021	45.51%	1
Social Democratic Party	PSD	8,801	39.97%	1
CDS – People's Party	CDS–PP	1,179	5.35%	0
Unitary Democratic Coalition	CDU	1,148	5.21%	0
The Earth Party Movement	MPT	302	1.37%	0
Left Bloc	BE	250	1.14%	0
Portuguese Workers' Communist Party	PCTP	168	0.76%	0
Workers' Party of Socialist Unity	POUS	68	0.31%	0
People's Monarchist Party	PPM	59	0.27%	0
National Renewal Party	PNR	22	0.10%	0
Valid votes		22,018	100.00%	2
Blank votes		112	0.47%	
Rejected votes – other		1,699	7.13%	
Total polled		23,829	27.86%	
Registered electors		85,538		

The following candidates were elected: Carlos Alberto Gonçalves (PSD) and Carlos Luís (PS).

==== 1990s ====
===== 1999 =====
Results of the 1999 legislative election held on 10 October 1999:

Party		Votes	%	Seats
Socialist Party	PS	14,277	60.49%	2
Social Democratic Party	PSD	6,353	26.92%	0
Unitary Democratic Coalition	CDU	1,351	5.72%	0
CDS – People's Party	CDS–PP	829	3.51%	0
The Earth Party Movement	MPT	276	1.17%	0
Portuguese Workers' Communist Party	PCTP	219	0.93%	0
Left Bloc	BE	145	0.61%	0
People's Monarchist Party	PPM	74	0.31%	0
Workers' Party of Socialist Unity	POUS	33	0.14%	0
National Solidarity Party	PSN	25	0.11%	0
Humanist Party	PH	20	0.08%	0
Valid votes		23,602	100.00%	2
Blank votes		78	0.30%	
Rejected votes – other		2,070	8.04%	
Total polled		25,750	26.54%	
Registered electors		97,023		

The following candidates were elected: Carlos Luís (PS) and Paulo Pisco (PS).

===== 1995 =====
Results of the 1995 legislative election held on 1 October 1995:

Party		Votes	%	Seats
Socialist Party	PS	9,067	42.56%	1
Social Democratic Party	PSD	8,740	41.02%	1
Unitary Democratic Coalition	CDU	1,652	7.75%	0
CDS – People's Party	CDS–PP	1,143	5.36%	0
The Earth Party Movement	MPT	252	1.18%	0
Portuguese Workers' Communist Party	PCTP	195	0.92%	0
Unity Movement for Workers	MUT	109	0.51%	0
Popular Democratic Union	UDP	79	0.37%	0
Revolutionary Socialist Party	PSR	56	0.26%	0
Democratic Party of the Atlantic	PDA	13	0.06%	0
Valid votes		21,306	100.00%	2
Blank votes		97	0.38%	
Rejected votes – other		4,452	17.22%	
Total polled		25,855	27.72%	
Registered electors		93,285		

The following candidates were elected: Paulo Pereira Coelho (PSD) and Carlos Luís (PS).

===== 1991 =====
Results of the 1991 legislative election held on 6 October 1991:

Party		Votes	%	Seats
Social Democratic Party	PSD	15,817	54.66%	1
Socialist Party	PS	9,393	32.46%	1
Unitary Democratic Coalition	CDU	2,311	7.99%	0
Social Democratic Centre Party	CDS	894	3.09%	0
Portuguese Workers' Communist Party	PCTP	234	0.81%	0
Democratic Renewal Party	PRD	141	0.49%	0
People's Monarchist Party	PPM	62	0.21%	0
Revolutionary Socialist Party	PSR	35	0.12%	0
Democratic Party of the Atlantic	PDA	32	0.11%	0
Left Revolutionary Front	FER	19	0.07%	0
Valid votes		28,938	100.00%	2
Blank votes		203	0.69%	
Rejected votes – other		343	1.16%	
Total polled		29,484	34.89%	
Registered electors		84,495		

The following candidates were elected: Pereira Lopes (PSD) and Caio Roque (PS).

==== 1980s ====
===== 1987 =====
Results of the 1987 legislative election held on 19 July 1987:

Party		Votes	%	Seats
Social Democratic Party	PSD	7,125	37.88%	1
Socialist Party	PS	5,467	29.06%	1
Unitary Democratic Coalition	CDU	3,054	16.24%	0
Social Democratic Centre Party	CDS	1,278	6.79%	0
Democratic Renewal Party	PRD	944	5.02%	0
Christian Democratic Party	PDC	311	1.65%	0
Portuguese Workers' Communist Party	PCTP	258	1.37%	0
Popular Democratic Union	UDP	144	0.77%	0
Portuguese Democratic Movement	MDP	97	0.52%	0
Communist Party (Reconstructed)	PC(R)	70	0.37%	0
People's Monarchist Party	PPM	38	0.20%	0
Revolutionary Socialist Party	PSR	25	0.13%	0
Valid votes		18,811	100.00%	2
Blank votes		384	1.99%	
Rejected votes – other		66	0.34%	
Total polled		19,261	26.39%	
Registered electors		72,978		

The following candidates were elected: Nascimento Rodrigues (PSD) and Caio Roque (PS).

===== 1985 =====
Results of the 1985 legislative election held on 6 October 1985:

Party		Votes	%	Seats
Social Democratic Party	PSD	5,712	25.18%	1
Socialist Party	PS	5,700	25.12%	1
United People Alliance	APU	4,417	19.47%	0
Social Democratic Centre Party	CDS	4,074	17.96%	0
Democratic Renewal Party	PRD	1,664	7.33%	0
Christian Democratic Party	PDC	486	2.14%	0
Portuguese Workers' Communist Party	PCTP	223	0.98%	0
Popular Democratic Union	UDP	203	0.89%	0
Workers' Party of Socialist Unity	POUS	109	0.48%	0
Communist Party (Reconstructed)	PC(R)	68	0.30%	0
Revolutionary Socialist Party	PSR	32	0.14%	0
Valid votes		22,688	100.00%	2
Blank votes		751	3.19%	
Rejected votes – other		101	0.43%	
Total polled		23,540	31.14%	
Registered electors		75,606		

The following candidates were elected: Maria Manuela Aguiar (PSD) and Rodolfo Crespo (PS).

===== 1983 =====
Results of the 1983 legislative election held on 25 April 1983:

Party		Votes	%	Seats
Socialist Party	PS	11,939	34.28%	1
Social Democratic Party	PSD	11,101	31.87%	1
United People Alliance	APU	6,069	17.43%	0
Social Democratic Centre Party	CDS	3,955	11.36%	0
Christian Democratic Party	PDC	815	2.34%	0
Socialist Workers League	LST	277	0.80%	0
Portuguese Workers' Communist Party	PCTP	232	0.67%	0
Workers' Party of Socialist Unity	POUS	150	0.43%	0
Popular Democratic Union and Revolutionary Socialist Party	UDP-PSR	113	0.32%	0
Democratic Party of the Atlantic	PDA	105	0.30%	0
Communist Party (Revolutionary)	PC(R)	48	0.14%	0
Portuguese Marxist–Leninist Communist Organization	OCMLP	23	0.07%	0
Valid votes		34,827	100.00%	2
Blank votes		404	1.14%	
Rejected votes – other		314	0.88%	
Total polled		35,545	47.65%	
Registered electors		74,590		

The following candidates were elected: José Figueiredo (PSD) and António Coimbra Martins (PS).

===== 1980 =====
Results of the 1980 legislative election held on 5 October 1980:

Party		Votes	%	Seats
Democratic Alliance	AD	21,757	49.55%	1
Socialist Party	PS	11,142	25.37%	1
United People Alliance	APU	6,678	15.74%	0
Christian Democratic Party, Independent Movement for the National Reconstruction / Party of the Portuguese Right and National Front	PDC- MIRN/ PDP- FN	1,075	2.45%	0
Popular Democratic Union	UDP	604	1.38%	0
Portuguese Workers' Communist Party	PCTP/MRPP	536	1.22%	0
Workers' Party of Socialist Unity / Socialist Workers' Party	POUS/PST	230	0.54%	0
Labour Party	PT	227	0.52%	0
Democratic Party of the Atlantic	UDA/PDA	110	0.25%	0
Revolutionary Socialist Party	PSR	62	0.14%	0
Valid votes		42,421	100.00%	2
Blank votes		740	1.69%	
Rejected votes – other		752	1.71%	
Total polled		43,913	62.35%	
Registered electors		70,426		

The following candidates were elected: Nandim de Carvalho (AD) and João Vieira Lima (PS).

==== 1970s ====
===== 1979 =====
Results of the 1979 legislative election held on 2 December 1979:

Party		Votes	%	Seats
Democratic Alliance	AD	16,154	38.28%	1
Socialist Party	PS	14,018	33.21%	1
United People Alliance	APU	5,659	13.41%	0
Christian Democratic Party	PDC	2,416	5.72%	0
Popular Democratic Union	UDP	2,391	3.30%	0
Portuguese Workers' Communist Party	PCTP/MRPP	932	2.21%	0
Left-wing Union for the Socialist Democracy	UEDS	436	1.03%	0
Revolutionary Socialist Party	PSR	91	0.22%	0
Valid votes		41,097	100.00%	2
Blank votes		394	0.93%	
Rejected votes – other		712	1.69%	
Total polled		42,203	71.31%	
Registered electors		59,184		

The following candidates were elected: João Vieira Lima (PS) and José Theodoro da Silva (AD).

===== 1976 =====
Results of the 1976 legislative election held on 25 April 1976:

Party		Votes	%	Seats
Socialist Party	PS	23,824	46.08%	1
Democratic People's Party	PPD	16,644	32.20%	1
Portuguese Communist Party	PCP	5,212	10.08%	0
Social Democratic Centre Party	CDS	3,555	6.88%	0
Christian Democratic Party	PDC	475	0.92%	0
Popular Democratic Union	UDP	407	0.79%	0
People's Socialist Front	FSP	183	0.35%	0
Movement of Socialist Left	MES	165	0.32%	0
Worker–Peasant Alliance	AOC	83	0.16%	0
Re-Organized Movement of the Party of the Proletariat	MRPP	69	0.13%	0
People's Monarchist Party	PPM	52	0.10%	0
Internationalist Communist League	LCI	28	0.05%	0
Valid votes		50,697	100.00%	2
Rejected votes		996	1.93%	
Total polled		51,693	90.15%	
Registered electors		57,341		

The following candidates were elected: João Cacela Leitão (PPD) and João Vieira Lima (PS).

== Voter statistics ==
The table below lists the number of voters registered in Portuguese diplomatic posts located in each country, for each legislative election. Some posts have jurisdiction over multiple countries and territories in different continents, so some numbers in the table include some voters residing in locations other than the named country.

The number of voters increased dramatically in 2018 due to the adoption of automatic voter registration.

Registered voters in the constituency of Europe
Country	2025	2024	2022	2019	2015	2011	2009	2005	2002
France	382,120	381,591	395,266	402,738	40,166	45,500	46,649	51,159	59,251
United Kingdom	184,383	176,633	156,709	125,495	1,852	957	980	993	1,211
Switzerland	147,601	147,881	149,728	146,795	9,457	7,713	5,283	4,408	5,063
Germany	75,809	75,662	76,057	78,005	14,219	10,718	10,219	11,348	11,723
Spain	44,930	45,293	42,691	38,582	4,945	3,115	2,537	2,329	2,272
Luxembourg	36,903	36,876	40,277	47,026	1,472	1,602	1,791	1,751	1,766
Netherlands	20,164	18,048	14,986	12,278	1,080	865	745	753	867
Belgium	18,070	17,330	18,157	19,261	1,949	2,269	2,376	1,500	1,461
Ireland	7,237	6,369	4,715	3,827	147	52	39	24	24
Andorra	4,764	6,923	7,793	6,999	1,168	675	455	347	632
Norway	4,301	4,066	3,186	2,822	148	137	151	128	121
Italy	4,142	3,944	3,295	2,728	508	674	703	611	614
Turkey	4,058	3,868	3,027	1,526	84	8	2		
Denmark	3,007	2,764	1,894	1,147	130	126	102	100	116
Sweden	2,737	2,592	2,219	1,693	454	213	181	182	220
Austria	2,115	1,999	1,811	1,583	147	95	86	55	67
Poland	1,243	1,134	958	662	127	93	47	6	13
Romania	953	883	824	712	28	17	16	1	1
Finland	821	810	586	360	119	72	51	18	18
Czech Republic	715	691	567	357	36	12	6	7	7
Cyprus	429	371	256	180	9	8	6		
Greece	426	424	291	131	35	50	52	52	52
Bulgaria	280	298	236	183	10	14	7	6	9
Hungary	248	249	224	185	32	31	11	9	9
Russia	186	211	251	167	16	7	6	11	15
Serbia	148	133	100	38		4	2	5	6
Slovakia	126	121	114			5	9		
Ukraine	79	84	106	78					
Croatia	67	63	52	32	7	1	1		
Slovenia						12	7		
Malta						7	5		
Estonia							3		
Total	948,062	937,311	926,376	895,590	78,345	75,052	72,528	75,803	85,538
