= Portuguese legislative elections =

Since 1974, the year of the Carnation Revolution, eighteen legislative elections have been held in Portugal.

The parliament is usually elected to a four-year term, and currently (as of 2025) there are 230 Members of the Parliament, elected in Party's lists in 22 constituencies, corresponding to the 18 continental districts, 2 autonomous regions, one constituency for the Portuguese living abroad in Europe and the last one for the Portuguese living abroad in the rest of the world.

Each constituency elects a number of MPs proportional to its registered voters number, ranging from the 48 MPs in Lisbon to the 2 in Portalegre.

== Electoral system ==
The Assembly of the Republic has 230 members elected to four-year terms. Governments do not require absolute majority support of the Assembly to hold office, as even if the number of opposers of government is larger than that of the supporters, the number of opposers still needs to be equal or greater than 116 (absolute majority) for both the Government's Programme to be rejected or for a motion of no confidence to be approved.

The number of seats assigned to each district depends on the district magnitude. The use of the d'Hondt method makes for a higher effective threshold than certain other allocation methods such as the Hare quota or Sainte-Laguë method, which are more generous to small parties.

For the 2025 legislative elections, the MPs were distributed by districts as follows:

District	Number of MPs	Map
Lisbon	48	
Porto	40	
Braga and Setúbal	19	
Aveiro	16	
Leiria	10	
Coimbra, Faro and Santarém	9	
Viseu	8	
Madeira	6	
Azores, Viana do Castelo and Vila Real	5	
Castelo Branco	4	
Beja, Bragança, Évora and Guarda	3	
Portalegre, Europe and Outside Europe	2	

== Election results 1976-2025 ==
Parties are listed from left-wing to right-wing.

Summary of Portuguese elections for the Assembly of the Republic, 1976–2025
Election	UDP	BE	MDP	PCP	PEV	L	PS	PAN	JPP	PRD	PSD	CDS	PPM	PSN	IL	CH	O/I	Turnout
1976	1.7; 1			14.4; 40			34.9; 107				24.4; 73	16.0; 42	0.5; 0				8.1; 0	83.5
1979 (Note: In the 1979 and 1980 elections, the Social Democratic Party (PSD), the Democratic Social Center (CDS) and the People's Monarchist Party (PPM) ran in a joint coalition called Democratic Alliance (AD). In the Madeira and Azores islands, however, the parties ran in separate lists but are added in total sum of the coalition.) (Note: In the 1979 and 1980 elections, the Communist Party (PCP) and the Portuguese Democratic Movement (MDP) ran in a joint coalition called United People Alliance (APU).)	2.2; 1		18.8: 3 / 44				27.3; 74				45.3: 80 / 43 / 5						6.2; 0	82.9
1980 (Note: In the 1980 election, the Socialist Party (PS), the Leftwing Union for the Socialist Democracy (UEDS) and the Independent Social Democratic Action (ASDI) ran in a joint coalition called Republican and Socialist Front (FRS). In the Madeira and Azores islands, plus the foreign electoral constituencies, however, the parties ran in separate lists but are added in total sum of the coalition.)	1.4; 1		16.8: 2 / 39				27.8; 74				47.6: 82 / 46 / 6						6.4; 0	83.9
1983 (Note: In the 1983 and 1985 elections, the Communist Party (PCP), Portuguese Democratic Movement (MDP) and the Ecologist Party "The Greens" (PEV) ran in a joint coalition called United People Alliance (APU).)	0.5; 0		18.1: 3 / 41				36.1; 101				27.2; 75	12.6; 30	0.5; 0				5.0; 0	77.8
1985	1.3; 0		15.5: 3 / 35				20.8; 57			17.9; 45	29.9; 88	10.0; 22					4.6; 0	74.2
1987 (Note: After the 1987 elections, and still today, the Communist Party (PCP) and the Ecologist Party "The Greens" (PEV) run in a joint coalition called Unitary Democratic Coalition (CDU).)	0.9; 0		0.6; 0	12.1: 29 / 2			22.2; 60			4.9; 7	50.2; 148	4.4; 4	0.4; 0				4.3; 0	71.6
1991	0.1; 0			8.8: 15 / 2			29.1; 72			0.6; 0	50.6; 135	4.4; 5	0.4; 0	1.7; 1			4.3; 0	67.8
1995	0.6; 0			8.6: 13 / 2			43.8; 112				34.1; 88	9.1; 15		0.2; 0			3.6; 0	66.3
1999		2.4; 2		9.0: 15 / 2			44.1; 115				32.3; 81	8.3; 15	0.3; 0	0.2; 0			3.4; 0	61.1
2002		2.7; 3		6.9: 10 / 2			37.8; 96				40.2; 105	8.7; 14	0.2; 0	0.0; 0			3.5; 0	61.5
2005		6.4; 8		7.5: 12 / 2			45.0; 121				28.8; 75	7.2; 12					5.1; 0	64.3
2009		9.8; 16		7.9: 13 / 2			36.6; 97				29.1; 81	10.4; 21	0.3; 0				5.9; 0	59.7
2011		5.2; 8		7.9: 14 / 2			28.0; 74	1.0; 0			38.7; 108	11.7; 24	0.3; 0				7.2; 0	58.0
2015 (Note: The Social Democratic Party (PSD) and the People's Party (CDS–PP) contested the 2015 election in a coalition called Portugal Ahead (PàF) and won a combined 38.6% of the vote and elected 107 MP's to parliament.)		10.2; 19		8.3: 15 / 2		0.7; 0	32.3; 86	1.4; 1	0.3; 0		38.6: 89 / 18		0.3; 0				8.2; 0	55.8
2019		9.5; 19		6.3: 10 / 2		1.1; 1	36.3; 108	3.3; 4	0.2; 0		27.8; 79	4.2; 5	0.2; 0		1.3; 1	1.3; 1	8.7; 0	48.6
2022		4.4; 5		4.3: 6 / 0		1.3; 1	41.4; 120	1.6; 1	0.2; 0		29.1; 77	1.6; 0	0.0; 0		4.9; 8	7.2; 12	4.2; 0	51.5
2024 (Note: In the 2024 election, the Social Democratic Party (PSD), the People's Party (CDS–PP) and the People's Monarchist Party (PPM) ran in a joint coalition called Democratic Alliance (AD). In Madeira, the PSD and CDS–PP ran in a coalition without PPM, but the results are added in total sum of the coalition.)		4.4; 5		3.2: 4 / 0		3.2; 4	28.0; 78	1.9; 1	0.3; 0		28.8: 78 / 2 / 0				4.9; 8	18.1; 50	7.5; 0	59.9
2025 (Note: In the 2025 election, the Social Democratic Party (PSD) and the People's Party (CDS–PP) ran in a joint coalition called AD – PSD/CDS Coalition. In Azores, the PSD and CDS–PP ran in a coalition with PPM, but the results are added in total sum of the coalition.)		2.0; 1		2.9: 3 / 0		4.1; 6	22.8; 58	1.4; 1	0.3; 1		31.8: 89 / 2		0.1; 0		5.4; 9	22.8; 60	6.4; 0	58.2
Source: Comissão Nacional de Eleições

== List of elections ==
Sample ballot for the 2024 legislative election.

- 1976 Portuguese legislative election
- 1979 Portuguese legislative election
- 1980 Portuguese legislative election
- 1983 Portuguese legislative election
- 1985 Portuguese legislative election
- 1987 Portuguese legislative election
- 1991 Portuguese legislative election
- 1995 Portuguese legislative election
- 1999 Portuguese legislative election
- 2002 Portuguese legislative election
- 2005 Portuguese legislative election
- 2009 Portuguese legislative election
- 2011 Portuguese legislative election
- 2015 Portuguese legislative election
- 2019 Portuguese legislative election
- 2022 Portuguese legislative election
- 2024 Portuguese legislative election
- 2025 Portuguese legislative election

== See also ==
- Elections in Portugal
- Politics of Portugal
- List of political parties in Portugal
