= Paulo Pisco =

Portuguese politician (born 1961)

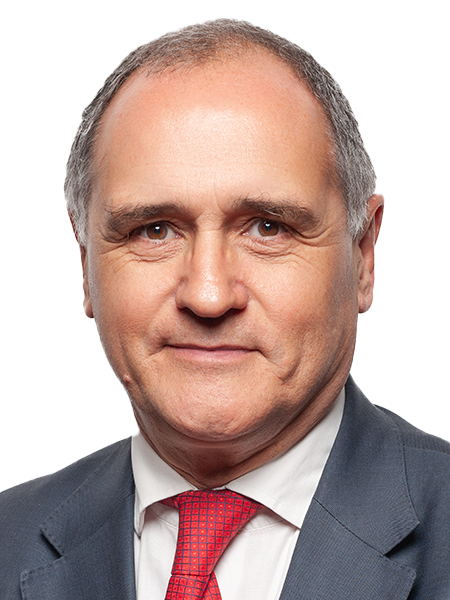
- Official portrait, 2024

Director of the Socialist Party's Department for Portuguese Communities Abroad
- Incumbent
- Assumed office September 2025

Member of the Assembly of the Republic
- In office 15 October 2009 – 2 June 2025
- Constituency: Europe
- In office 25 October 1999 – 4 April 2002
- Constituency: Europe

Personal details
- Born: Paulo Alexandre de Carvalho Pisco; 22 August 1961 (age 65) Portugal
- Party: Socialist Party
- Spouse: Fernanda Maria Valente Soares
- Occupation: Journalist • politician

Paulo Alexandre de Carvalho Pisco (born 22 August 1961) is a Portuguese politician, currently serving as Director of the Socialist Party's Department for Portuguese Communities Abroad, a position created by José Luís Carneiro.

Pisco previously served as a Member of Parliament in the Assembly of the Portuguese Republic for the Socialist Party (PS), representing the Europe constituency, which covers the Portuguese diaspora. He was first elected in the 8th Legislature (1999–2002) and returned in the 11th Legislature (2009–2011) until the 16th Legislature (2024–2025).

During his time in parliament, Pisco coordinated the Socialist Parliamentary Group within the Committee on Foreign Affairs and Portuguese Communities and was a member of the European Affairs Committee.

From 2017 to 2025, he represented Portugal in the Parliamentary Assembly of the Council of Europe, sitting with the Socialists, Democrats and Greens Group. He participated in several committees, including the Committee on Migration, Refugees and Displaced Persons, the Sub-Committee on Refugee and Migrant Children and Young People, and the Sub-Committee on Diasporas and Integration.

He also served as Chair of the Portugal-Luxembourg Parliamentary Friendship Group and Vice-Chair of the Portugal-France Parliamentary Friendship Group.

Before entering politics, Pisco was a journalist. He holds a degree in Philosophy from Universidade Nova de Lisboa and a postgraduate qualification in European Studies from the Université libre de Bruxelles.

== Electoral history ==
=== Legislative elections ===
Election	Party	Constituency	List position	Party position	Votes	%	+/-	Status	Notes
1999	PS	Europe	2nd	1st	14,277	55.44%		Elected	
2009	PS	Europe	1st	1st	7,219	43.02%		Elected	
2011	PS	Europe	1st	1st	7,204	40.16%	▼2.86	Elected	
2015	PS	Europe	1st	2nd	4,081	29.88%	▼10.28	Elected	
2019	PS	Europe	1st	1st	31,362	29.96%	▲0.08	Elected	Automatic voter registration for Portuguese citizens abroad was introduced, increasing the number of voters.
2022	PS	Europe	1st	1st	36,069	32.98%	▲3.92	Elected	The results of the 2022 legislative election held on 30 January 2022 in the constituency were annulled by the Constitutional Court due ballot papers without copies of voter IDs (which are therefore null and void) being mixed with ballots with voter IDs (which are valid votes) at around 150 polling stations.
2024	PS	Europe	1st	2nd	38,061	16.22%	▼16.76	Elected	For the first time, Chega elected an MP from this constituency.

== Awards and honours ==
=== National awards ===
- Lusosphere Awards - Citizenship Award (2018)

=== Foreign honours ===
- Luxembourg: Knight of the Order of Merit of the Grand Duchy of Luxembourg (15 April 2015)
- Honorary Associate Member of the Parliamentary Assembly of the Council of Europe (January 2026)
