= José Dias Fernandes =

Portuguese-French politician

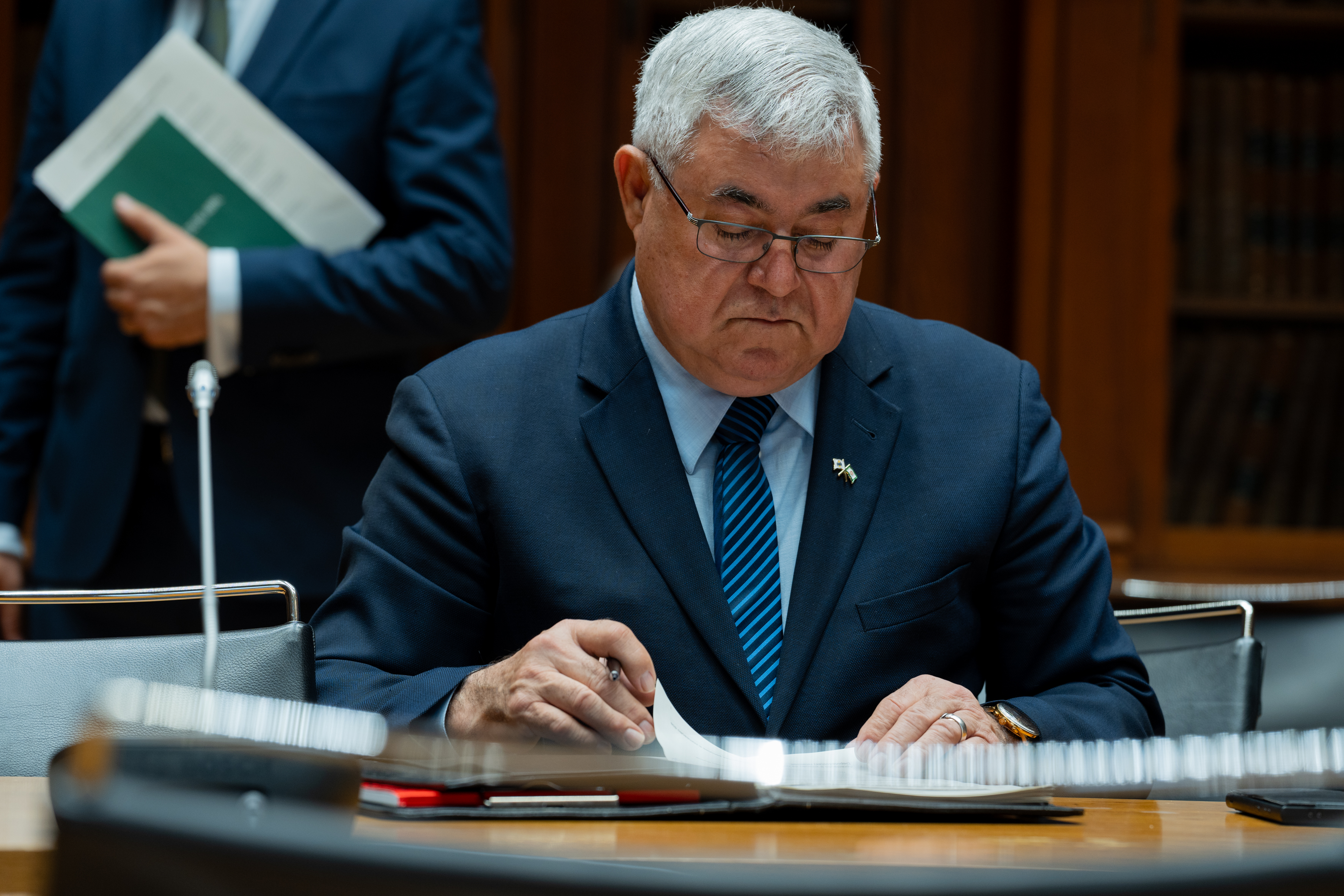
- Fernandes in 2024

Member of the Assembly of the Republic
- Incumbent
- Assumed office 26 March 2024
- Constituency: Europe

Personal details
- Born: José Dias Fernandes; 30 May 1959 (age 67) Viana do Castelo, Portugal
- Citizenship: Portugal • France
- Party: Chega (2020–present); RN/FN (2020–present)
- Other political affiliations: CDS–PP (until 2020)
- Children: 1
- Occupation: Businessman • Politician

José Dias Fernandes (born 30 May 1959) is a Portuguese-French businessman and politician. Currently, he serves as a member of the Assembly of the Republic, for CHEGA, for the Europe constituency.

José Dias Fernandes has been an emigrant for 50 years and works in France as a businessman. He left Portugal in the 70s, but for years he lived and worked as an illegal immigrant in France. He emigrated to France again in 1978, after being deported, and became legal during the presidency of François Mitterrand.

He joined the CHEGA party in 2020, after leaving CDS – People's Party, being head of the list for the Europe constituency in the 2022 legislative elections, having not been elected. In 2024, he was announced, again, as head of the list by the Europe constituency in the 2024 legislative elections.
