= Socialist Workers' Party (Portugal) =

Trotskyist party in Portugal, 1980–1981

Socialist Workers' Party Partido Socialista dos Trabalhadores
- Secretary-General: Antônio Maria de Sá Leal
- Founded: 12 June 1980
- Dissolved: 4 May 1981
- Split from: Revolutionary Socialist Party
- Succeeded by: Socialist Workers' League
- Headquarters: Lisbon, Portugal
- Newspaper: Voz Socialista (Socialist Voice)
- Ideology: Revolutionary socialism Trotskyism
- Political position: Far-left
- International affiliation: International Committee of the Fourth International
- Colours: Red

The Socialist Workers' Party (Partido Socialista dos Trabalhadores, PST) was a Portuguese far-left political party of Trotskyist orientation, officially registered on 12 June 1980 and dissolved on 4 May 1981. It was founded by dissidents of the Revolutionary Socialist Party (PSR). Its Secretary-General was Antônio Maria de Sá Leal.

== Background ==
The PST's origins lay in a factional split within Portuguese Trotskyism linked to an international crisis in the Fourth International. In 1978, two Trotskyist parties: the Internationalist Communist League (LCI) and the Workers' Revolutionary Party (PRT), had merged to form the Revolutionary Socialist Party (PSR), which was recognised as the Portuguese section of the reunified Fourth International. The PRT had followed a Trotskyist orientation aligned with the Argentine Nahuel Moreno and published the newspaper Combate Socialista.

Shortly after the merger, a major international split occurred between Moreno's Bolshevik Faction and the United Secretariat of the Fourth International. In Portugal, the majority of former PRT members broke with the PSR over this dispute. The Portuguese Morenist faction maintained close ties with their international co-thinkers; in September 1978, the faction's leader Antônio Maria de Sá Leal was arrested and expelled from Brazil while at Congonhas Airport in São Paulo in the company of Brazilian socialist militants linked to the Convergência Socialista. These dissidents would go on to formally establish the PST in 1980, aligning with the Parity Committee, which brought together the Morenist and Lambertist tendencies in an attempt to reconstruct the Fourth International. The Parity Committee operated from 1979 to 1980 and produced the Forty Theses, a set of agreements between the Moreno and Lambert tendencies, which led to the founding of the International Committee of the Fourth International at a World Conference in December 1980.

== Ideology and goals ==
The PST described itself as the Portuguese section of the Fourth International, proletarian and revolutionary, with the stated objective of establishing a dictatorship of the proletariat through the abolition of capitalism. It was linked both to the Parity Committee and specifically to Moreno's Bolshevik Faction within the international Trotskyist movement. The party published a newspaper called Voz Socialista (Socialist Voice).

== Electoral history ==
The PST contested a single election during its brief existence. In the 1980 Portuguese legislative election, held on 5 October 1980, it ran in coalition with the Workers' Party of Socialist Unity (POUS), a Lambertist party. The POUS/PST coalition received 83,095 votes, equivalent to 1.38% of the total, and failed to win any seats in the Assembly of the Republic.

The election was dominated by the centre-right Democratic Alliance (AD), which won an absolute majority with 47.6% and 134 seats, while the Republican and Socialist Front (FRS), led by the Socialist Party, came second with 27.8%. The far-left was fragmented across several small parties; besides the POUS/PST coalition, the PSR received 1.03%, the UDP won 1.41% and the only far-left seat, and others such as the PCTP/MRPP took smaller shares.

Electoral results
| Year | Coalition | Type of election | Votes | % | Seats |
|---|---|---|---|---|---|
| 1980 | POUS/PST | Legislative | 83,095 | 1.38% | 0 |
Source: National Elections Commission

== Dissolution and legacy ==
The PST was dissolved by order of the Supreme Court of Justice on 4 May 1981, having existed for less than eleven months. By this time, the international alliance that had given rise to the party was itself fracturing: following the victory of François Mitterrand in the French presidential election of May 1981, the Internationalist Communist Organisation, Lambert's party in France, gave its support to the new government, a position denounced by Moreno's tendency as a capitulation to the popular front. Lambert refused to allow discussion of the French policy and began expelling dissidents, provoking a definitive split; Moreno's followers went on to found the International Workers League in 1982.

Following the PST's dissolution, its former members regrouped. In 1983, the Liga Socialista dos Trabalhadores (LST, Socialist Workers' League) was officially registered with the Supreme Court of Justice, continuing the Morenist Trotskyist tradition in Portugal under the leadership of Gil Garcia. The LST later renamed itself the Frente de Esquerda Revolucionária (FER) in 1989, as confirmed by ruling 327/89 of the Constitutional Court. The FER eventually merged with the student movement Ruptura in 2000 to become Ruptura/FER, and later the Movimento Alternativa Socialista (MAS), which remains active in Portuguese politics.
