= Worker–Peasant Alliance =

Worker-Peasant Alliance
- Founded: 1974
- Ideology: Communism; Marxism-Leninism; Maoism; Anti-revisionism
- Political position: Far-left

Worker–Peasant Alliance (Portuguese: Aliança Operário-Camponesa, pronounced [ɐliˈɐ̃sɐ opɨˈɾaɾiɔ kɐ̃puˈnezɐ]) was a front of the Communist Party of Portugal (Marxist-Leninist) of Eduíno Gomes. AOC was founded on November 17, 1974 and ran lists in the 1976 elections. AOC mustered 15,578 votes (0.03%).

AOC launched the slogan "Neither Kissinger, Nor Brezhnev. National Independence!" (Nem Kissinger, nem Brejnev, independência nacional!).
