= 2002 Portuguese legislative election =

- 17 March 2002

All 230 seats in the Assembly of the Republic 116 seats needed for a majority
- Registered: 8,902,713 ▲0.4%
- Turnout: 5,472,851 (61.5%) ▲0.4 pp
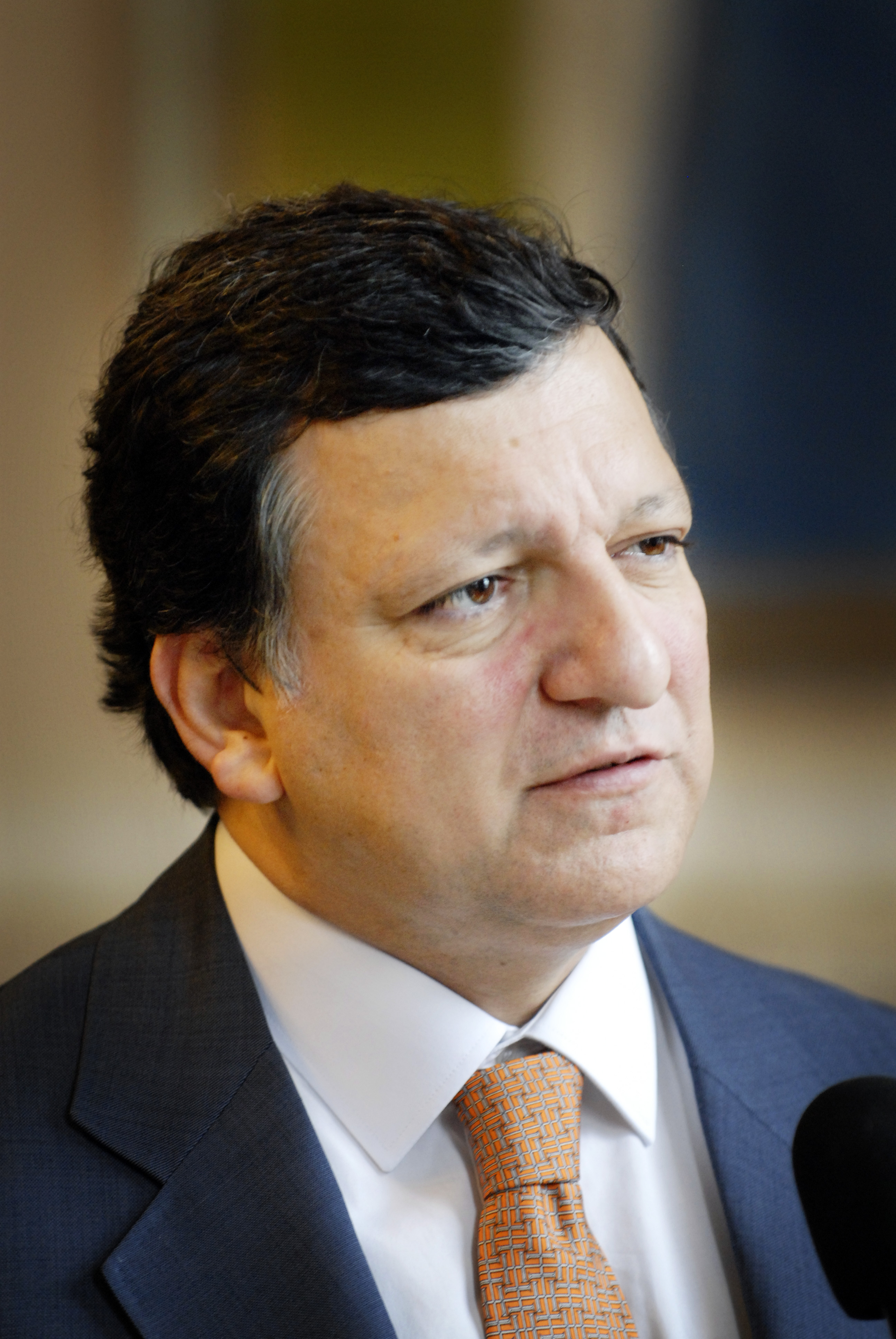

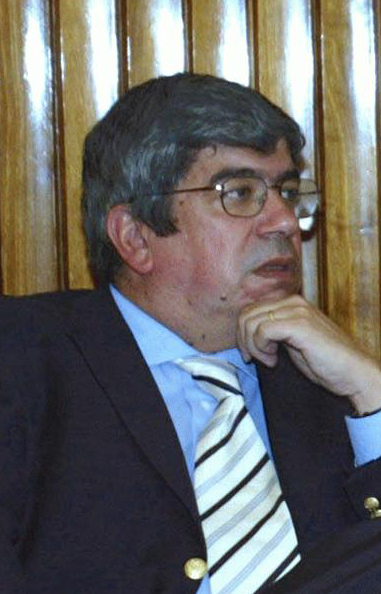

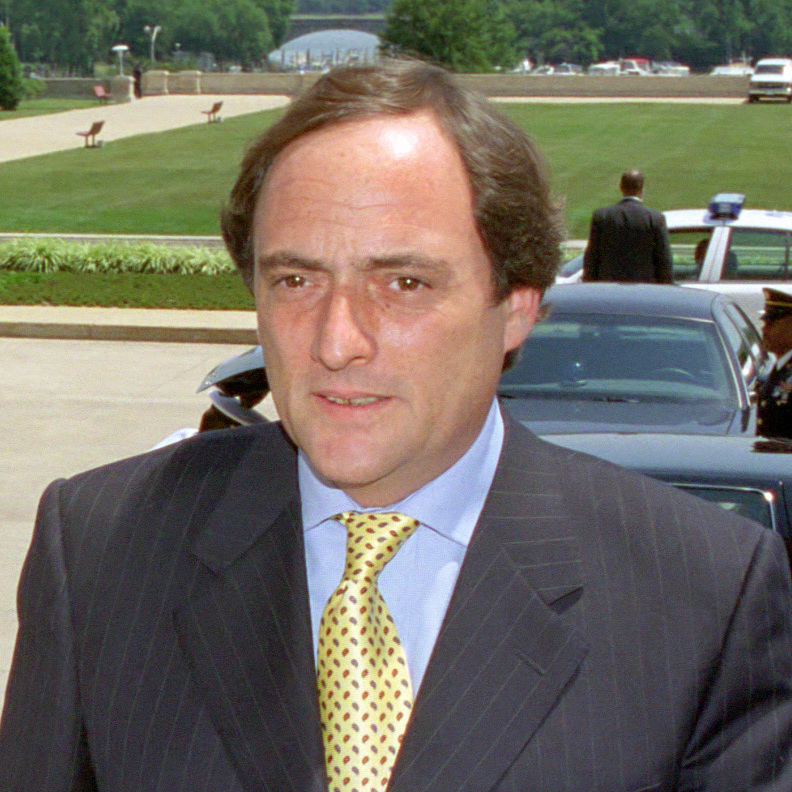

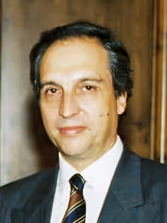

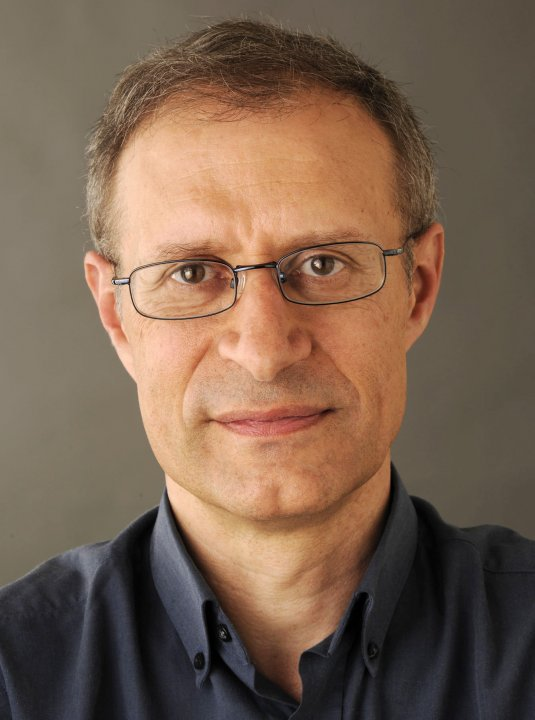
	First party	Second party	Third party
Leader	José Durão Barroso	Ferro Rodrigues	Paulo Portas
Party	PSD	PS	CDS–PP
Leader since	2 May 1999	20 January 2002	22 March 1998
Leader's seat	Lisbon	Lisbon	Aveiro
Last election	81 seats, 32.3%	115 seats, 44.1%	15 seats, 8.3%
Seats won	105	96	14
Seat change	▲24	▼19	▼1
Popular vote	2,200,765	2,068,584	477,350
Percentage	40.2%	37.8%	8.7%
Swing	▲7.9 pp	▼6.3 pp	▲0.4 pp
	Fourth party	Fifth party
Leader	Carlos Carvalhas	Francisco Louçã
Party	PCP	BE
Alliance	CDU
Leader since	5 December 1992	24 March 1999
Leader's seat	Lisbon	Lisbon
Last election	17 seats, 9.0%	2 seats, 2.4%
Seats won	12	3
Seat change	▼5	▲1
Popular vote	379,870	153,877
Percentage	6.9%	2.8%
Swing	▼2.0 pp	▲0.4 pp
Prime Minister before election
António Guterres
PS
Prime Minister after election
José Manuel Barroso
PSD

The 2002 Portuguese legislative election took place on 17 March. The election renewed all 230 members of the Assembly of the Republic.

This election was called following the resignation of then incumbent Prime Minister António Guterres, after the defeat of the Socialist Party in the 2001 local elections. That fact, plus the problematic state of the country's finances, were the main arguments for the right-wing opposition, making them the favorites to win the election.

With just over 40 percent of the votes cast, the Social Democrats (PSD) regained the status as the largest political force in Portugal, although the Socialists (PS) won almost 38 percent of the vote. This was the closest legislative election in Portuguese democracy until 2024. This short distance also appears in the electoral map, with each party winning eleven of the 22 districts, while the PS won the two most populous, Lisbon and Porto. As a result, the Social Democrats failed to win the absolute majority they had between 1987 and 1995, despite having requested it during the campaign.

As no party gained a majority, the Social Democrats formed a coalition with the right-wing People's Party (CDS–PP), which had a fairly solid performance, polling in third place. The left-wing Democratic Unity Coalition (CDU) achieved its lowest result up to that point, being surpassed by CDS–PP and finishing third in its traditional strongholds of Évora and Setúbal. The Left Bloc (BE) gained just one MP. Voter turnout was slightly higher than it was in 1999, as 61.5 percent of the electorate cast a ballot.

== Background ==
After the disappointing result of the Socialist Party (PS) in the 1999 election, the PS government entered in a series of crises. Resignations of ministers from government, a worsening fiscal and economic situation and the inability to pass legislation in Parliament, put pressure over the government, leading to controversial, and weird, alliances, such as the approval of the 2000 and 2001 budgets by a sole CDS – People's Party (CDS–PP) member of parliament, Daniel Campelo, in exchange for the government approving a cheese factory in Campelo's hometown, Ponte de Lima, in Viana do Castelo district.

=== Government fall ===
The Socialist Party suffered a big, and unexpected, defeat in the December 2001 local elections. The party lost major municipalities across the country, mainly Lisbon, Porto, Sintra and Coimbra to the Social Democratic Party. Due to this surprising defeat, Prime Minister António Guterres announced he would tender his resignation as Prime Minister to prevent the country from falling "into a political swamp". President Jorge Sampaio accepted Guterres resignation and called a snap election for March 2002.

=== Leadership changes and challenges ===
==== Social Democratic Party ====
After the 1999 election defeat, Durão Barroso's leadership started to be challenged and criticized. In January 2000, Durão Barroso called a snap party congress to resolve the leadership dispute. Alongside Barroso, Pedro Santana Lopes and Luís Marques Mendes also ran. Durão Barroso was reelected as PSD leader and the results were the following:

Ballot: 27 February 2000
Candidate	Votes	%
José Manuel Durão Barroso	469	50.3
Pedro Santana Lopes	313	33.6
Luís Marques Mendes	150	16.1
Turnout	932	
Source: Results

==== Socialist Party ====
Following the resignation of António Guterres as Prime Minister and PS leader, the party started the process to elect a new leader. The popular minister in Guterres cabinet, Eduardo Ferro Rodrigues, and PS member Paulo Penedos, were the two candidates on the ballot, while the minister of Foreign Affairs Jaime Gama, who had announced his candidacy, dropped out. Around 121,000 PS members were registered to vote. In the end, Ferro Rodrigues got almost unanimous support by being elected with almost 97 percent of the votes. The results were the following:

Ballot: 18 and 19 January 2002
Candidate	Votes	%
Eduardo Ferro Rodrigues		96.5
Paulo Penedos		2.7
Blank/Invalid ballots		0.8
Turnout		
Source: Results

=== Electoral system ===
Official logo of the election.

The Assembly of the Republic has 230 members elected to four-year terms. Governments do not require absolute majority support of the Assembly to hold office, as even if the number of opposers of government is larger than that of the supporters, the number of opposers still needs to be equal or greater than 116 (absolute majority) for both the Government's Programme to be rejected or for a motion of no confidence to be approved.

The number of seats assigned to each district depends on the district magnitude. The use of the d'Hondt method makes for a higher effective threshold than certain other allocation methods such as the Hare quota or Sainte-Laguë method, which are more generous to small parties.

For these elections, and compared with the 1999 elections, the MPs distributed by districts were the following:

District	Number of MPs	Map
Lisbon^{(–1)}	48	
Porto^{(+1)}	38	
Braga^{(+1)}	18	
Setúbal	17	
Aveiro	15	
Leiria, Santarém and Coimbra	10	
Viseu	9	
Faro	8	
Viana do Castelo	6	
Azores, Castelo Branco, Madeira and Vila Real	5	
Bragança and Guarda	4	
Beja, Évora^{(–1)} and Portalegre	3	
Europe and Outside Europe	2	

== Parties ==
Following the failure to form a joint coalition for the 1999 election, the idea of a PSD/CDS–PP was once again raised but ultimately rejected. The table below lists the parties represented in the Assembly of the Republic during the 8th legislature (1999–2002) and that also partook in the election:

Name		Ideology	Political position	Leader	1999 result		Seats at dissolution
Name		Ideology	Political position	Leader	%	Seats	Seats at dissolution
PS	Socialist Party; Partido Socialista	Social democracy	Centre-left	Ferro Rodrigues	44.1%	115 / 230	115 / 230
PPD/PSD	Social Democratic Party; Partido Social Democrata	Liberal conservatism Classical liberalism	Centre-right	José Manuel Durão Barroso	32.3%	81 / 230	81 / 230
PCP	Portuguese Communist Party; Partido Comunista Português	Communism; Marxism–Leninism	Far-left	Carlos Carvalhas	9.0% (Note: The Portuguese Communist Party (PCP) and the Ecologist Party "The Greens" (PEV) contested the 1999 election in a coalition called Unitary Democratic Coalition (CDU) and won a combined 9% of the vote and elected 17 MPs to parliament.)	15 / 230	15 / 230
PEV	Ecologist Party "The Greens"; Partido Ecologista "Os Verdes"	Eco-socialism; Green politics	Left-wing	Isabel Castro	9.0%	2 / 230	2 / 230
CDS–PP	CDS – People's Party; Centro Democrático e Social – Partido Popular	Christian democracy Conservatism	Centre-right to right-wing	Paulo Portas	8.3%	15 / 230	14 / 230
BE	Left Bloc; Bloco de Esquerda	Democratic socialism Anti-capitalism	Left-wing	Francisco Louçã	2.4%	2 / 230	1 / 230
Ind.	Independent; Independente	Daniel Campelo (left the CDS – People's Party caucus)					1 / 230

=== Seat changes ===
- On 7 November 2000, MP Daniel Campelo, elected in the CDS – People's Party list for Viana do Castelo, left the party and became an Independent, following a split with CDS–PP regarding his votes in favour of António Guterres government's State budgets.

== Campaign period ==
=== Issues ===
The campaign was dominated by the country's economic situation. Social Democratic Party (PSD) leader, Durão Barroso, proposed strong changes, from a "fiscal shock", by cutting income and corporate taxes, to reforms in the public sector. The issue of public sector reform, in addition to gaffes made during the campaign, created problems to the PSD cause. On the other side, the Socialists (PS), led by Eduardo Ferro Rodrigues, portrayed the PSD policies as "voodoo economics", adding this would jeopardize Portugal's deficit situation, even though the party also proposed tax and spending cuts. Despite being stronger than Barroso in personal popularity polls, Ferro Rodrigues had to contend with accusations of mismanagement, corruption, and problematic public service responses during the Socialists' six-year term. The People's Party (CDS–PP) focused on issues such as security and wage increases, while the left-wing, mainly the communist Unitary Democratic Coalition (CDU), campaigned to bolster its vote count with a view to potential post-election alliances with the PS.

=== Party slogans ===
Party or alliance	Original slogan	English translation	Refs
PS	« Fazer bem »	"Do well"	
PSD	« Somos todos Portugal »	"We are all Portugal"	
CDU	« Mudar para melhor »	"Change for the better"	
CDS–PP	« O braço direito de Portugal »	"Portugal's right-hand man"	
BE	« Com Razões Fortes »	"With Strong Reasons"	

=== Candidates' debates ===
2002 Portuguese legislative election debates
Date	Organisers	Moderator(s)	P Present A Absent invitee N Non-invitee					
Date	Organisers	Moderator(s)	PS Rodrigues	PSD Barroso	CDU Carvalhas	CDS–PP Portas	BE Louçã	Refs
26 Feb	SIC		P	P	N	N	N	
12 Mar	RTP1	Judite de Sousa; José Alberto Carvalho	P	P	P	P	P	

== Opinion polling ==
The following table shows the opinion polls of voting intention of the Portuguese voters before the election. Included is also the result of the Portuguese general elections in 1999 and 2002 for reference.

Exit poll

Polling firm/Link	Date Released	PS	PSD	CDU	CDS–PP	BE	O	Lead
2002 legislative election	17 Mar 2002	37.8; 96	40.2; 105	6.9; 12	8.7; 14	2.7; 3	3.7; 0	2.4
UCP	17 Mar 2002 (20:00)	36– 41	37–42	5.5–8	7.5– 10	3–4	—	1
Eurosondagem	17 Mar 2002 (20:00)	35.5–39.3	40.1–43.9	6.2–8.4	6.2–8.4	2.0–3.4	—	4.6
Intercampus	17 Mar 2002 (20:00)	35.5–40.5	37.8–42.8	6.8–9.8	5.3–8.3	1.6–4.2	—	2.3
Marktest	15 Mar 2002	35.2	43.7	8.1	6.0	3.7	3.3	8.5
Lusófona	15 Mar 2002	40.9	43.6	5.7	7.1	2.8	—N/a	2.7
Eurosondagem	15 Mar 2002	39.3	41.4	6.9	5.6	3.5	3.3	2.1
Eurequipa	15 Mar 2002	33.9	44.7	7.1	9.1	3.2	2.0	10.8
UCP	14 Mar 2002	37.5; 93/101	42.2; 103/110	6.9; 10/15	6.8; 7/2	3.6; 3/6	3.0; 0	4.7
Intercampus	14 Mar 2002	39	41	8	5	3	4	2
Aximage	14 Mar 2002	40	44	7	6	2	1	4
SIC/Visão	13 Mar 2002	36.2	41.0	6.6	5.2	2.0	9.0	4.8
Eurosondagem	8 Mar 2002	39.9	42.7	—N/a	—N/a	—N/a	17.4	2.8
Marktest	8 Mar 2002	36	43	6	7	4	4	7
Visão	7 Mar 2002	38.4	41.2	2.4	5.4	2.1	10.5	2.8
Eurosondagem	2 Mar 2002	35	38	6	5	2	14	3
Eurequipa	1 Mar 2002	35.0	42.3	—N/a	—N/a	—N/a	22.7	7.3
SIC/Visão	28 Feb 2002	43.0	47.6	—N/a	—N/a	—N/a	9.4	4.6
UCP	26 Feb 2002	35.6	43.5	5.5	4.7	2.7	8.0	7.9
Marktest	Feb 2002	34.7	45.7	6.7	7.3	2.5	3.1	11.0
UCP	10 Jan 2002	41.4	43.0	7.1	2.7	2.5	3.3	1.6
Marktest	Jan 2002	33.8	41.8	9.6	8.1	2.5	4.2	8.0
Marktest	22 Dec 2001	34	39	11	9	3	4	5
2001 local elections	16 Dec 2001	37.1	41.1	10.6	4.0	1.2	6.0	4.0
Marktest	Nov 2001	35.4	33.7	10.6	11.6	2.9	5.8	1.7
Marktest	Oct 2001	35.9	33.9	10.5	11.5	2.7	5.5	2.0
UCP	11 Oct 2001	42.4	36.2	7.6	5.0	2.6	6.2	6.2
UCP	Jul 2001	41.7	38.2	6.1	6.0	2.3	5.7	3.5
Marktest	28 Jun 2001	34.8	35.1	10.7	10.7	3.3	5.4	0.3
SIC/Visão	8 Jun 2001	36.2	37.8	—N/a	—N/a	—N/a	26.0	1.6
Marktest	27 Apr 2001	38	34	9	10	—N/a	9	4
Marktest	Mar 2001	39	35	—N/a	—N/a	—N/a	26	4
Marktest	26 Jan 2001	37	33	10	11	3	6	4
Marktest	26 May 2000	38.1	30.3	10.8	13.3	2.8	4.7	7.8
UCP (Note: Results presented here exclude abstention (19.7%). With their inclusion results are: PS: 32.8%; PSD: 26.1%; CDS-PP: 6.5%; CDU: 5.4%; BE: 2.4%; Others/Invalid: 7.1%.)	8 May 2000	40.9	32.5	6.7	8.1	3.0	8.8	8.4
1999 legislative election	10 Oct 1999	44.1; 115	32.3; 81	9.0; 17	8.3; 15	2.4; 2	3.9; 0	11.9

== Voter turnout ==
The table below shows voter turnout throughout election day including voters from Overseas. Due to lack of data from the 1999 election, it's not possible to compare the turnout throughout election day between the two elections.

Turnout	Time						
Turnout	12:00		16:00		19:00		
Turnout	1999	2002	1999	2002	1999	2002	±
Total	—N/a	18.00%	—N/a	45.88%	61.09%	61.48%	▲0.39 pp

== Results ==
=== National summary ===
Party	Votes	%	+/–	Seats	+/–
Social Democratic Party	2,200,765	40.21	+7.89	105	+24
Socialist Party	2,068,584	37.80	–6.26	96	–19
CDS – People's Party	477,350	8.72	+0.38	14	–1
Unitary Democratic Coalition (Note: Portuguese Communist Party (10 MPs) and "The Greens" (2 MPs) ran in coalition.)	379,870	6.94	–2.05	12	–5
Left Bloc	149,966	2.74	+0.30	3	+1
Portuguese Workers' Communist Party	36,193	0.66	–0.08	0	0
Earth Party	15,540	0.28	–0.09	0	0
People's Monarchist Party	12,398	0.23	–0.08	0	0
Humanist Party	11,472	0.21	+0.07	0	0
National Renovator Party	4,712	0.09	New	0	New
Workers' Party of Socialist Unity	4,316	0.08	+0.00	0	0
Left Bloc–Popular Democratic Union (Note: Left Bloc / People's Democratic Union joint electoral list only in Madeira.)	3,911	0.07	—	0	—
National Solidarity Party (Note: The National Solidarity Party (PSN) ran a list in Vila Real district, but dropped out before election day and got just 7 votes. In the certified results, the votes are counted as invalid.)	0	0.00	–0.21	0	0
Total	5,365,077	100.00	–	230	0
Valid votes	5,365,077	98.03	+0.03		
Invalid votes	52,653	0.96	+0.01		
Blank votes	55,121	1.01	–0.04		
Total votes	5,472,851	100.00	–		
Registered voters/turnout	8,902,713	61.47	+0.38		
Source: Comissão Nacional de Eleições (Note: The total vote count from the National Electoral Commission (CNE) is incorrect. In the results table and bar box, the correct number for the sum of votes was used to calculate the percentages for the different parties.)

Vote share
PSD	40.21%
PS	37.80%
CDS-PP	8.72%
CDU	6.94%
BE	2.74%
PCTP/MRPP	0.66%
Others	0.96%
Blank/Invalid	1.97%

Parliamentary seats
PSD	45.65%
PS	41.74%
CDS-PP	6.09%
CDU	5.22%
BE	1.30%

=== Distribution by constituency ===
Results of the 2002 election of the Portuguese Assembly of the Republic by constituency
Constituency	%	S	%	S	%	S	%	S	%	S	Total S
Constituency	PSD		PS		CDS–PP		CDU		BE		Total S
Azores	45.4	3	41.0	2	8.4	-	1.4	-	1.4	-	5
Aveiro	46.4	8	33.5	5	12.9	2	2.6	-	1.8	-	15
Beja	21.2	-	43.5	2	3.7	-	24.2	1	1.9	-	3
Braga	44.4	9	37.4	8	9.3	1	4.4	-	1.7	-	18
Bragança	53.2	3	30.0	1	10.9	-	1.9	-	0.9	-	4
Castelo Branco	38.3	2	46.1	3	7.1	-	3.3	-	1.5	-	5
Coimbra	41.0	5	41.3	5	6.7	-	5.1	-	2.4	-	10
Évora	25.3	1	42.8	1	4.6	-	21.8	1	1.8	-	3
Faro	37.7	4	40.5	4	8.3	-	6.3	-	2.8	-	8
Guarda	48.5	2	34.7	2	9.6	-	2.2	-	1.2	-	4
Leiria	50.8	6	29.5	3	9.8	1	4.1	-	2.2	-	10
Lisbon	35.7	18	38.7	20	8.5	4	8.8	4	4.7	2	48
Madeira	53.5	4	25.8	1	12.1	-	2.5	-	3.1	-	5
Portalegre	30.6	1	45.2	2	6.4	-	12.4	-	1.6	-	3
Porto	40.0	16	41.2	17	8.4	3	4.6	1	2.7	1	38
Santarém	38.1	4	38.4	4	8.4	1	8.6	1	2.9	-	10
Setúbal	24.7	5	39.3	7	6.9	1	20.5	4	4.6	-	17
Viana do Castelo	45.5	3	35.3	3	10.3	-	3.5	-	1.8	-	6
Vila Real	54.1	3	31.9	2	8.1	-	2.0	-	0.9	-	5
Viseu	52.1	5	31.1	3	10.6	1	1.5	-	1.4	-	9
Europe	36.9	1	42.1	1	5.0	-	4.8	-	1.1	-	2
Outside Europe	66.3	2	21.5	-	3.4	-	0.9	-	0.4	-	2
Total	40.2	105	37.8	96	8.7	14	6.9	12	2.7	3	230
Source: Comissão Nacional de Eleições

=== Maps ===
Winner and seats by constituency.

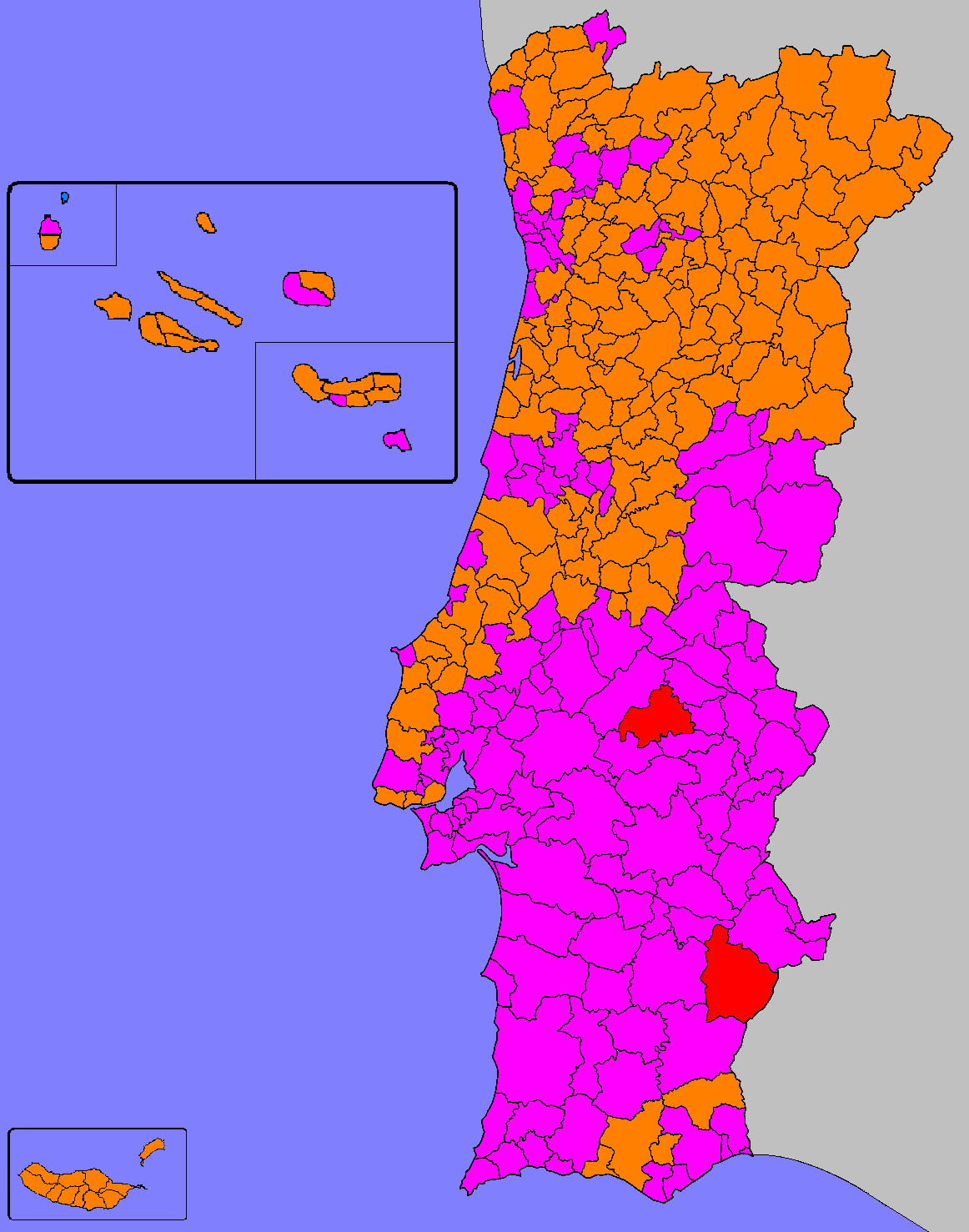
Most voted political force by municipality.

== Aftermath ==
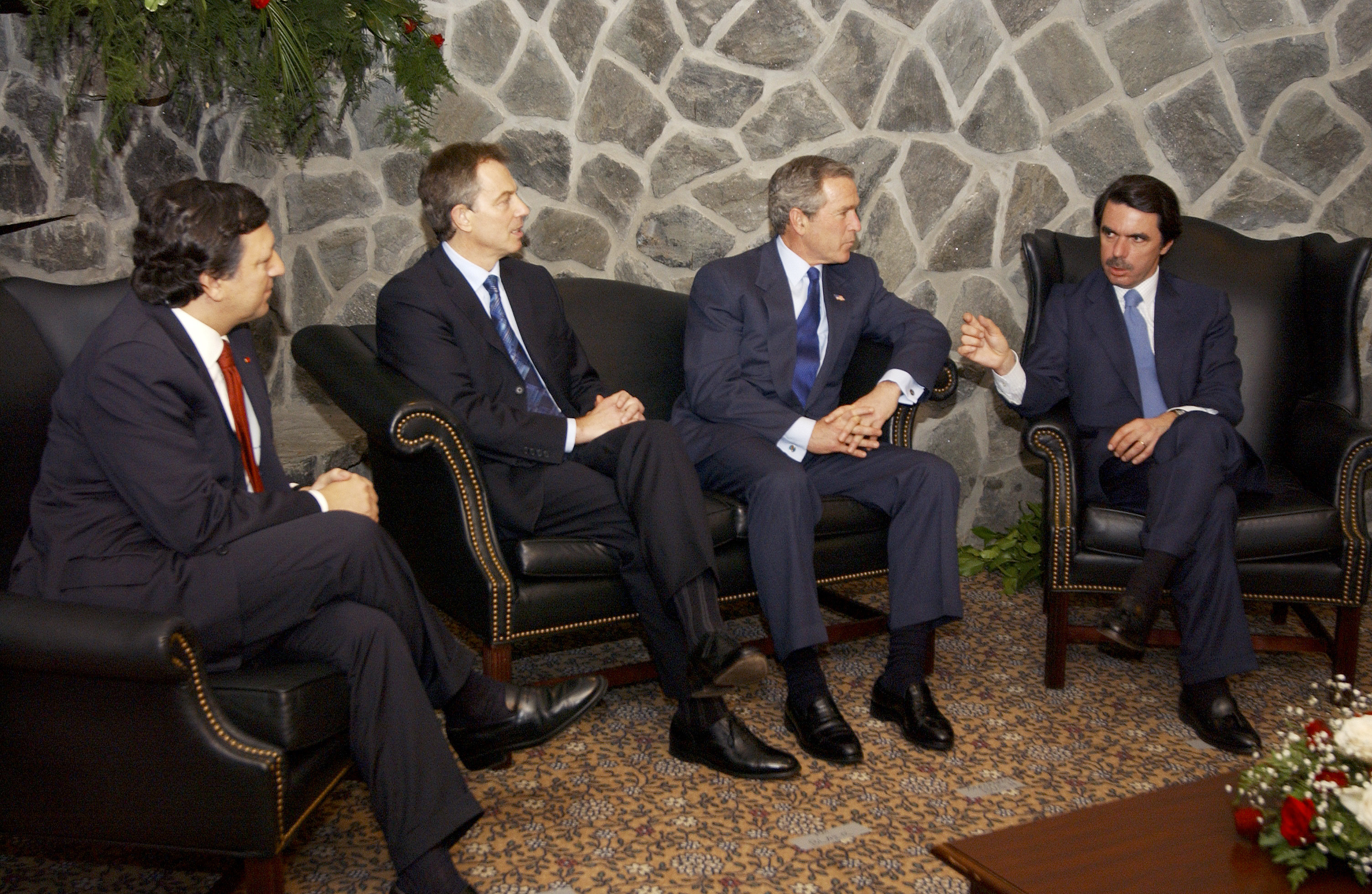
Leaders during the Azores Summit in 2003

After the election, PSD and CDS–PP formed a coalition government, the first since the Democratic Alliance (AD) in the early 1980s. This government was marked by the fragile fiscal and economic situation of the country, with Durão Barroso accusing the PS of leaving the country "in loincloth", and the 2003 Casa Pia child sexual abuse scandal. The Moderna University corruption case, from 1999 and that ended a coalition project between PSD and CDS–PP, in which minister Paulo Portas was allegedly involved, also marked the term. During this government, Portugal became a major ally in the War in Iraq, even hosting a summit at Lajes Field, in the Azores, between the United States, the United Kingdom and Spain, which divided public opinion and also generated a disagreement with President Sampaio, since the head of state was against the invasion and the deployment of Portuguese military forces. In the 2004 European Parliament election in Portugal, the PSD/CDS–PP coalition Força Portugal suffered a big defeat by gathering just 33 percent of the votes, against the 44 percent of the Socialist Party. A few days later, José Manuel Durão Barroso announced he was resigning from the post of Prime Minister in order to become President of the European Commission. Despite pleas for a snap legislative election from Opposition parties, President Jorge Sampaio decided to nominate the new PSD leader, Pedro Santana Lopes, as prime minister.

=== Fall of the government ===
Santana Lopes government was marked by deep disagreements and disputes within his own party, the Social Democratic Party, as well as mismanagement, which began to damage the government's actions. Several cases followed: The so-called "Caso Marcelo", which broke in early October 2004 regarding former PSD leader Marcelo Rebelo de Sousa's TVI punditry show, that ended abruptly with Marcelo Rebelo de Sousa accusing TVI's management board of pressuring him not to be too critical of the then government in his television commentaries, being widely considered as an attack on freedom of the press; Problems related to teacher allocation at the start of the 2004 school year, which led to delays in opening schools, also damaged the government; And then there was the resignation of Youth and Sports Minister, Henrique Chaves, which was a close ally of Santana. This resignation precipitated the fall of the government, with Chaves accusing Santana of not being "loyal and truthful". Following this, and just five months after swearing in Santana Lopes as prime minister, President Jorge Sampaio gave a speech in which he accused the government of "contradictions and lack of coordination that contributed to its discredit", using his power of dissolution of Parliament and called a snap election, so far the only time till date such a drastic action was used in Portuguese democracy by a president. Santana Lopes disagreed with the President's decision but respected it and announced his resignation. A new election was called, by the President, for 20 February 2005.

== See also ==
- Politics of Portugal
- List of political parties in Portugal
- Elections in Portugal
