= 1999 Portuguese legislative election =

- 10 October 1999

All 230 seats in the Assembly of the Republic 116 seats needed for a majority
- Registered: 8,864,604 ▼0.5%
- Turnout: 5,415,150 (61.1%) ▼5.2 pp
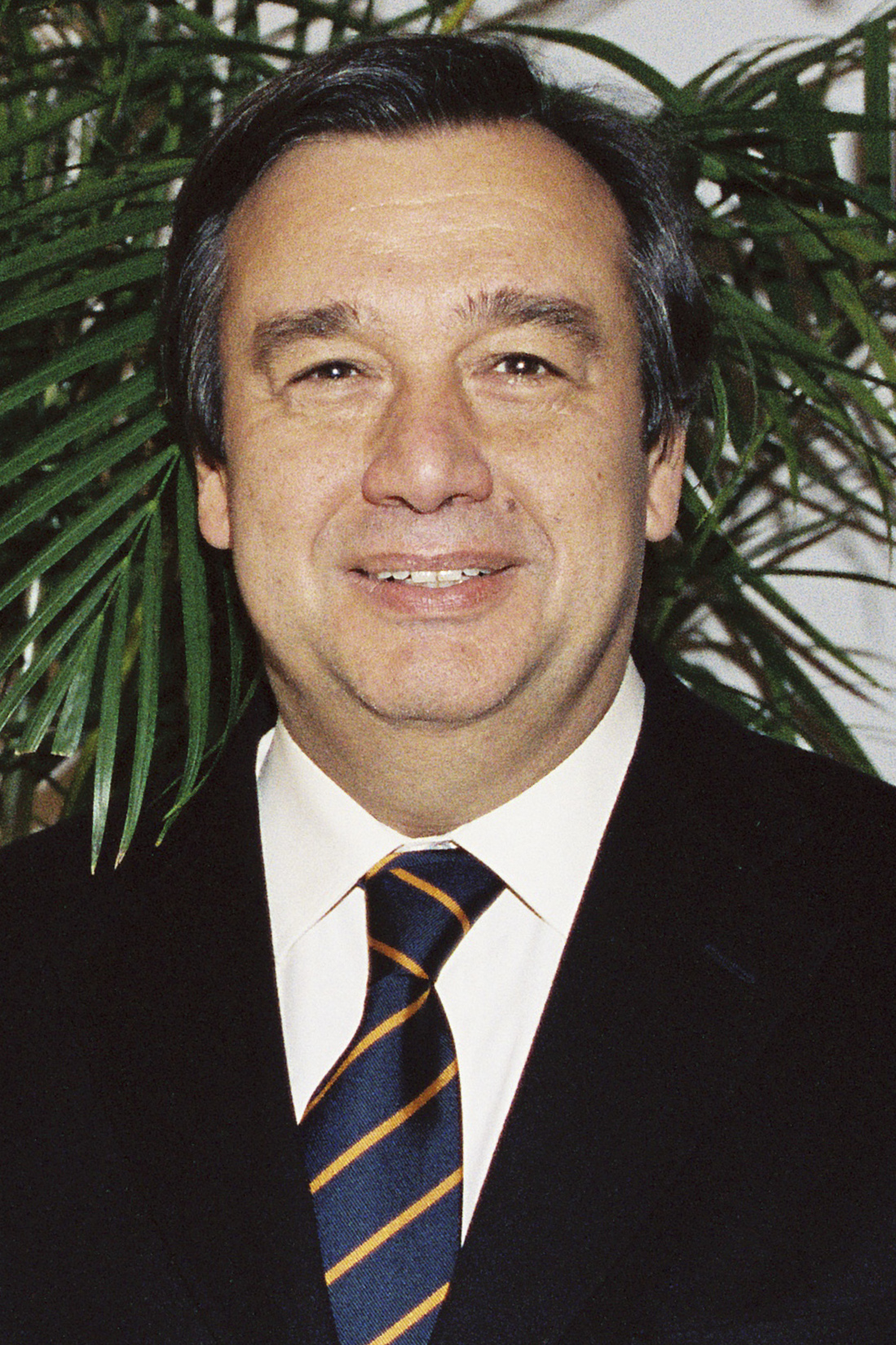

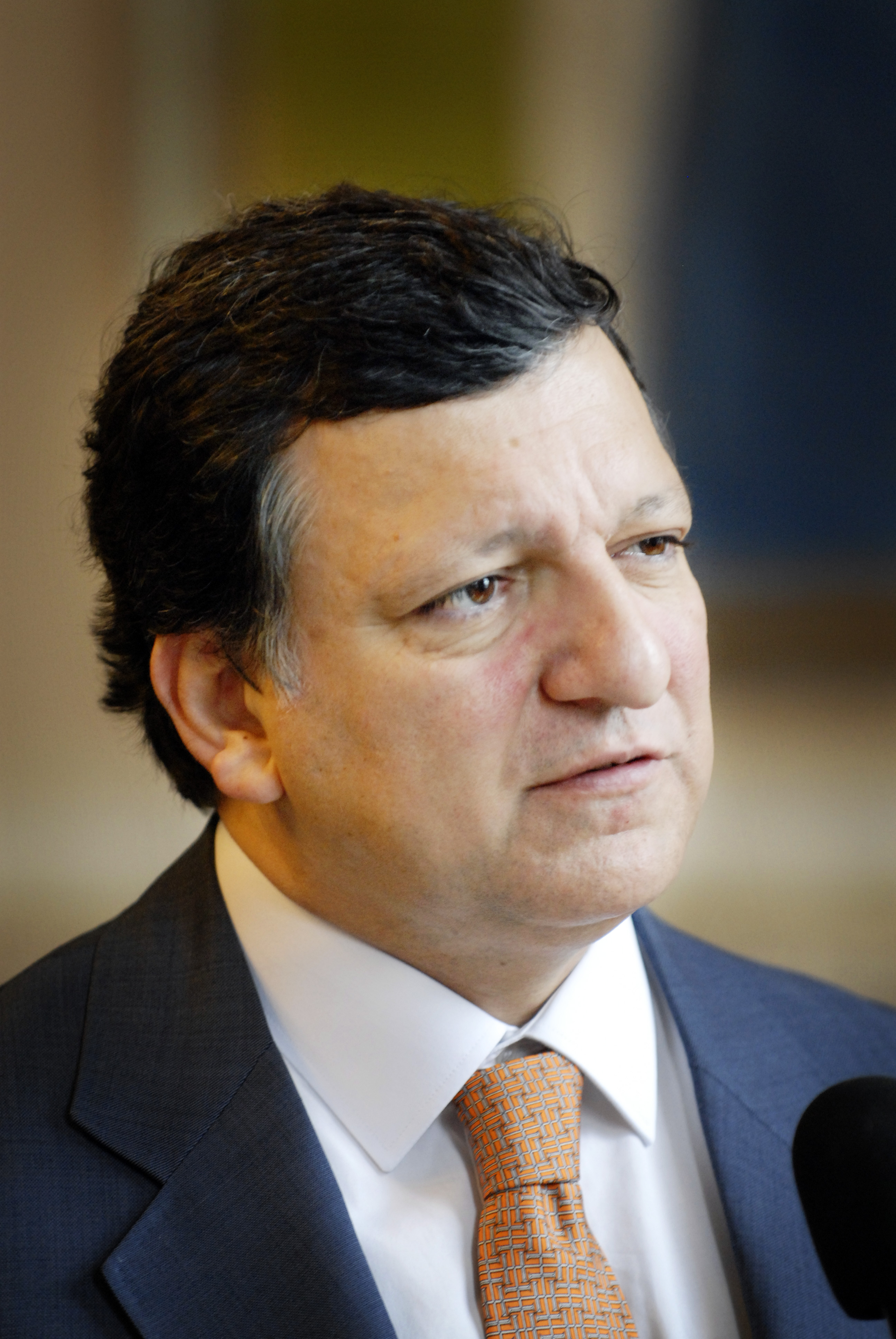

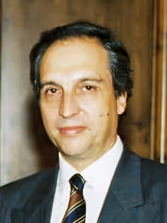

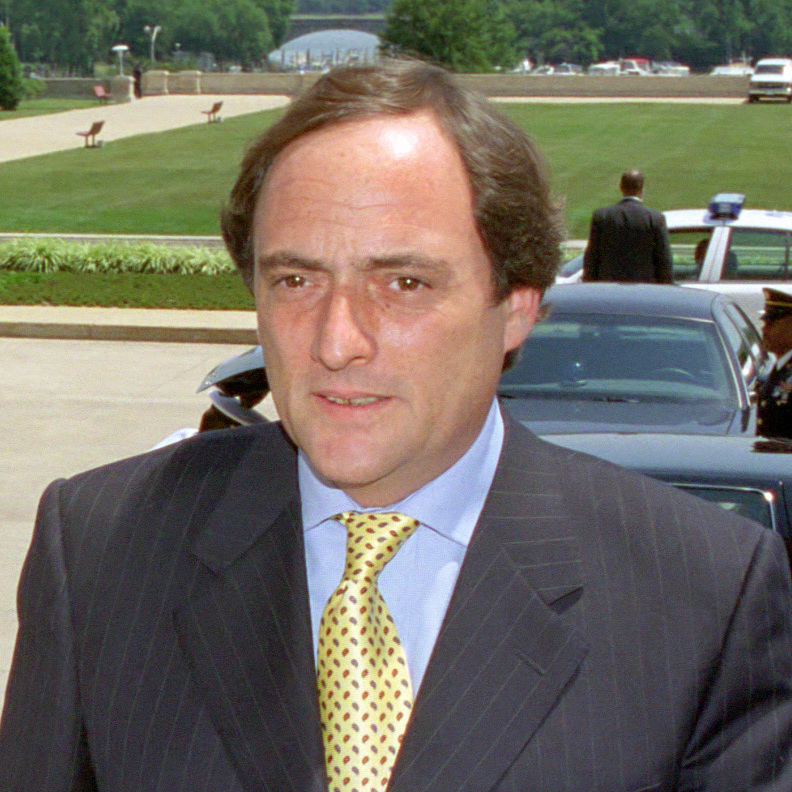

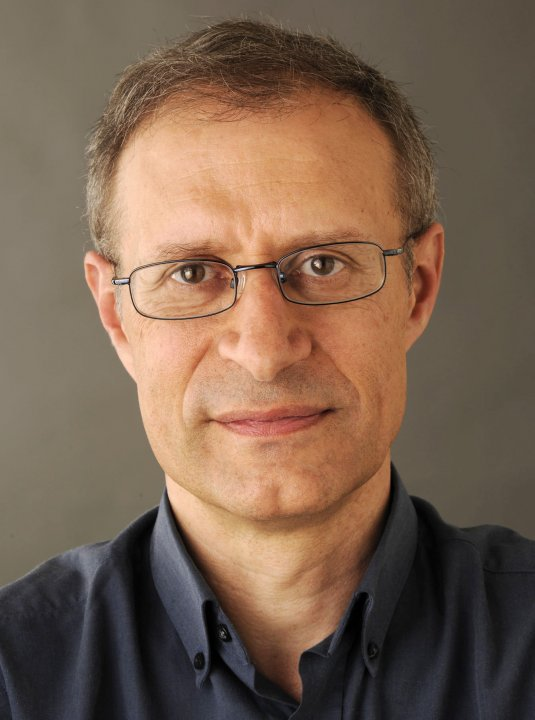
| | First party | Second party | Third party |
|---|---|---|---|
| Leader | António Guterres | José Durão Barroso | Carlos Carvalhas |
| Party | PS | PSD | PCP |
| Alliance | | | CDU |
| Leader since | 23 February 1992 | 2 May 1999 | 5 December 1992 |
| Leader's seat | Castelo Branco | Lisbon | Lisbon |
| Last election | 112 seats, 43.8% | 88 seats, 34.1% | 15 seats, 8.6% |
| Seats won | 115 | 81 | 17 |
| Seat change | ▲3 | ▼7 | ▲2 |
| Popular vote | 2,385,922 | 1,750,158 | 487,058 |
| Percentage | 44.1% | 32.3% | 9.0% |
| Swing | ▲0.3 pp | ▼1.8 pp | ▲0.4 pp |
| | Fourth party | Fifth party |
| Leader | Paulo Portas | Francisco Louçã |
| Party | CDS–PP | BE |
| Leader since | 22 March 1998 | 24 March 1999 |
| Leader's seat | Aveiro | Lisbon |
| Last election | 15 seats, 9.0% | Did not contest |
| Seats won | 15 | 2 |
| Seat change | 0 | ▲2 |
| Popular vote | 451,643 | 132,333 |
| Percentage | 8.3% | 2.4% |
| Swing | ▼0.7 pp | New party |
Prime Minister before election
António Guterres
PS
Prime Minister after election
António Guterres
PS

The 1999 Portuguese legislative election took place on 10 October. The election renewed all 230 members of the Assembly of the Republic.

Incumbent Prime Minister António Guterres ran for a second term, but despite opinion poll predictions, the election results were labeled as a disappointment for Guterres' Socialists, as the party failed to win a historical absolute majority by just one MP and barely improved their 1995 score, just 0.3 percentage points. The disappointing PS score would create instability in Guterres' second government in the years to follow. The Social Democratic Party was still away from the preferences of the majority of the Portuguese people, after the ten years cycle under the lead of Cavaco Silva that had terminated four years before, and lost 7 MPs, compared with 1995, and gathered 32 percent of the votes.

The Democratic Unity Coalition managed to recover, gaining two seats and defying predictions of its irreversible decline after the collapse of the Socialist Bloc in the early 1990s. The CDS–People's Party was able to hold on to its 15 MPs after tensions with the PSD earlier that year. For the first time, the Left Bloc, formed after the merger of several minor left-wing parties, gained representation in parliament by electing two MPs.

The turnout rate was low, being the lowest until it was surpassed in 2009 and all subsequent elections. Overall, voter turnout was only 61 percent of voters, one of the lowest ever recorded.

== Background ==
Guterres' first government became the first minority government in Portuguese democracy to complete a 4-year term, marked by the country's growing economy and stature, following the Expo 1998 and the support for the East-Timor cause. Furthermore, during this term, the Socialists' center-right opposition faced deep divisions, but despite this background, Guterres' government also suffered some setbacks, such as the 1998 abortion and regionalisation referendums, the latter one seen as the major defeat.

=== Leadership changes and challenges ===
==== Social Democratic Party ====
After leading his party to two successive defeats, in the 1995 election and in the 1996 Presidential election, then PSD leader Fernando Nogueira resigned. A party congress to elect a new leader was called for late March 1996. For that leadership ballot, Marcelo Rebelo de Sousa announced his candidacy, just a few days after saying a phrase that would become famous in Portuguese politics, "Not even if Christ descends to earth, will I run." Marcelo faced Pedro Santana Lopes, which repeated his failed bid of 1995. Marcelo Rebelo de Sousa was easily elected as PSD leader. The results were the following:

Ballot: 30 March 1996
| Candidate | Votes | % |
|---|---|---|
| Marcelo Rebelo de Sousa | 603 | 66.4 |
| Pedro Santana Lopes | 305 | 33.6 |
| Turnout | 908 | |
Source: Results

By late 1998, PSD leader Marcelo Rebelo de Sousa's plan to create an electoral alliance with the CDS – People's Party was splitting his party, but nonetheless, the alliance was approved in a party congress in February 1999, under the name "Democratic Alternative" (AD). However, at the same a time, a scandal allegedly involving CDS–PP leader Paulo Portas, the "Moderna case", in which alleged corrupt dealings and mismanagement occurred at Moderna University, was creating a bad mood between PSD and CDS–PP, and especially between the two party leaders, with Marcelo not publicly supporting Portas. In reaction, by late March, Paulo Portas revealed private conversations with Marcelo on an interview to SIC, that precipitated the end of the AD alliance project. Feeling betrayed and seeing that the alliance was unfeasible, Marcelo Rebelo de Sousa resigned from the PSD leadership. A snap party congress was called for early May, and, as the sole candidate, José Manuel Durão Barroso was unanimously elected as the new PSD leader:

Ballot: 1 May 1999
| Candidate | Votes | % |
|---|---|---|
| José Manuel Durão Barroso | | 100.0 |
| Turnout | | |
Source: Results

==== CDS – People's Party ====
Then CDS leader, Manuel Monteiro, resigned from the leadership after the party's poor results in the 1997 local elections. Paulo Portas, which had a tense relationship with Monteiro, announced his candidacy but faced the candidate of the "Monteiro wing", Maria José Nogueira Pinto. The congress was very tense, with strong accusations between both candidates, but in the end Paulo Portas was elected as new party leader:

Ballot: 22 March 1998
| Candidate | Votes | % |
|---|---|---|
| Paulo Portas | WIN | |
| Maria José Nogueira Pinto | | |
| Turnout | | |

== Electoral system ==
Official logo of the election.

The Assembly of the Republic has 230 members elected to four-year terms. Governments do not require absolute majority support of the Assembly to hold office, as even if the number of opposers of government is larger than that of the supporters, the number of opposers still needs to be equal or greater than 116 (absolute majority) for both the Government's Programme to be rejected or for a motion of no confidence to be approved.

The number of seats assigned to each district depends on the district magnitude. The use of the d'Hondt method makes for a higher effective threshold than certain other allocation methods such as the Hare quota or Sainte-Laguë method, which are more generous to small parties.

For these elections, and compared with the 1995 elections, the MPs distributed by districts were the following:

| District | Number of MPs | Map |
|---|---|---|
| Lisbon^{(–1)} | 49 | |
| Porto | 37 | |
| Braga^{(+1)} | 17 | |
| Setúbal | 17 | |
| Aveiro^{(+1)} | 15 | |
| Leiria, Santarém and Coimbra | 10 | |
| Viseu | 9 | |
| Faro | 8 | |
| Viana do Castelo | 6 | |
| Azores, Castelo Branco, Madeira and Vila Real | 5 | |
| Bragança, Évora and Guarda | 4 | |
| Beja^{(–1)} and Portalegre | 3 | |
| Europe and Outside Europe | 2 | |

== Parties ==
The table below lists the parties represented in the Assembly of the Republic during the 7th legislature (1995–1999) and that also partook in the election:

| Name | | Ideology | Political position | Leader | 1995 result | |
| Name | | Ideology | Political position | Leader | % | Seats |
|---|---|---|---|---|---|---|
| PS | Socialist Party; Partido Socialista | Social democracy Third Way | Centre-left to Centre | António Guterres | 43.8% | 112 / 230 |
| PPD/PSD | Social Democratic Party; Partido Social Democrata | Liberal conservatism Classical liberalism | Centre-right | José Manuel Durão Barroso | 34.1% | 88 / 230 |
| CDS–PP | CDS – People's Party; Centro Democrático e Social – Partido Popular | Christian democracy Conservatism | Centre-right to right-wing | Paulo Portas | 9.1% | 15 / 230 |
| PCP | Portuguese Communist Party; Partido Comunista Português | Communism; Marxism–Leninism | Far-left | Carlos Carvalhas | 8.6% (Note: The Portuguese Communist Party (PCP) and the Ecologist Party "The Greens" (PEV) contested the 1999 election in a coalition called Unitary Democratic Coalition (CDU) and won a combined 8.6% of the vote and elected 15 MPs to parliament.) | 13 / 230 |
| PEV | Ecologist Party "The Greens"; Partido Ecologista "Os Verdes" | Eco-socialism; Green politics | Left-wing | Isabel Castro | 8.6% | 2 / 230 |

== Campaign period ==
=== Issues ===
The campaign was dominated by the country's good economic situation, with António Guterres, Prime Minister and PS leader, campaigning intensely to win a majority, amidst pre-election polls predicting a comfortable PS majority, while the internal divisions that affected the center-right Social Democrats (PSD) at the beginning of the year also became evident during the campaign period. The last few days of the campaign were overshadowed by the death of fado singer Amália Rodrigues, with campaign events being cancelled.

=== Party slogans ===
| Party or alliance | Original slogan | English translation | Refs |
|---|---|---|---|
| PS | « Portugal em boas mãos » | "Portugal in good hands" | |
| PSD | « Vamos cumprir » | "We will deliver" | |
| CDS–PP | « Alternativa'99 » | "Alternative'99" | |
| CDU | « Para que não fique tudo na mesma » | "So that everything will not stay the same" | |
| BE | « É tempo de ser exigente » | "It's time to be demanding" | |

=== Candidates' debates ===
1999 Portuguese legislative election debates
| Date | Organisers | Moderator(s) | P Present A Absent invitee N Non-invitee | | | | |
| Date | Organisers | Moderator(s) | PS Guterres | PSD Barroso | CDU Carvalhas | CDS–PP Portas | Refs |
|---|---|---|---|---|---|---|---|
| 16 Sep | SIC | José Alberto Carvalho | P | P | N | N | |
| 17 Sep | SIC | José Alberto Carvalho | N | N | P | P | |
| 19 Sep | SIC | José Alberto Carvalho | N | P | N | P | |
| 20 Sep | SIC | José Alberto Carvalho | P | N | P | N | |
| 21 Sep | SIC | José Alberto Carvalho | P | N | N | P | |
| 22 Sep | SIC | José Alberto Carvalho | N | P | P | N | |
| 23 Sep | RTP1 | Judite de Sousa | P | P | P | P | |
Candidate viewed as "most convincing" in each debate
| Date | Organisers | Polling firm/Link | | | | | |
| Date | Organisers | Polling firm/Link | PS | PSD | CDU | CDS–PP | Notes |
| 16 Sep | SIC | SIC | 57 | 25 | —N/a | —N/a | 18% Neither |

== Opinion polling ==
The following table shows the opinion polls of voting intention of the Portuguese voters before the election. Included is also the result of the Portuguese general elections in 1995 and 1999 for reference.

Note, until 2000, the publication of opinion polls in the last week of the campaign was forbidden.

Exit poll

| Polling firm/Link | Date Released | PS | PSD | CDS–PP | CDU | BE | O | Lead |
|---|---|---|---|---|---|---|---|---|
| 1999 legislative election | 10 Oct 1999 | 44.1; 115 | 32.3; 81 | 8.3; 15 | 9.0; 17 | 2.4; 2 | 3.9; 0 | 11.8 |
| UCP | 10 Oct 1999 | 46.0 | 30.3 | 7.5 | 8.5 | 2.5 | 5.2 | 15.7 |
| Seeds | 10 Oct 1999 | 46.3 | 31.5 | 8.0 | 9.8 | 2.8 | 1.6 | 14.8 |
| Intercampus | 10 Oct 1999 | 46.3 | 28.6 | 8.3 | 9.5 | 3.2 | 4.1 | 17.7 |
| Euroexpansão | 2 Oct 1999 | 50 | 32 | 8 | 6 | 2 | 2 | 18 |
| Seeds | 1 Oct 1999 | 47 | 32 | 7 | 8 | 1 | 5 | 15 |
| Metris | 1 Oct 1999 | 48 | 31 | 7 | 7 | 1 | 6 | 17 |
| UCP | 1 Oct 1999 | 47.2 | 30.0 | 7.2 | 7.9 | 2.8 | 4.9 | 17.2 |
| Marktest | 30 Sep 1999 | 46.2 | 30.7 | 4.2 | 10.6 | 2.8 | 5.5 | 15.5 |
| Aximage | 30 Sep 1999 | 49 | 33 | 6 | 7 | 1 | 4 | 16 |
| Euroexpansão | 25 Sep 1999 | 50.0 | 33.8 | —N/a | —N/a | —N/a | 16.2 | 16.2 |
| SIC/Visão | 23 Sep 1999 | 46.8 | 31.8 | —N/a | —N/a | —N/a | 21.4 | 15.0 |
| Euroexpansão | 18 Sep 1999 | 49.0 | 35.4 | —N/a | —N/a | —N/a | 15.6 | 13.5 |
| Independente | 17 Sep 1999 | 45.0 | 34.2 | —N/a | —N/a | —N/a | 20.8 | 10.8 |
| UCP | 14 Sep 1999 | 56.4 | 30.1 | —N/a | —N/a | —N/a | 13.5 | 26.3 |
| UCP | 29 Jul 1999 | 52.0 | 31.6 | 6.2 | 6.9 | 1.9 | 1.4 | 20.4 |
| 1999 EP elections | 13 Jun 1999 | 43.1 | 31.1 | 8.2 | 10.3 | 1.8 | 5.5 | 12.0 |
| UCP | 19 Mar 1999 | 55.3 | 32.6 (Note: Poll with the proposed Democratic Alternative (AD) between PSD and CDS–PP that ultimately failed and didn't run for the elections.) | | 9.3 | 2.0 | 0.8 | 22.7 |
| UCP | Sep 1998 | 45.3 | 36.1 | 5.2 | 6.9 | —N/a | 6.5 | 9.2 |
| 1997 local elections | 14 Dec 1997 | 41.2 | 35.2 | 6.3 | 12.0 | —N/a | 5.3 | 6.0 |
| UCP | 21 Mar 1997 | 40 | 33 | 6.5 | 8 | —N/a | 12.5 | 7 |
| UCP | Dec 1996 | 47 | 29 | —N/a | —N/a | —N/a | 24 | 18 |
| Euroexpansão | 25 Nov 1995 | 48.0 | 28.8 | 9.8 | 4.8 | —N/a | 8.6 | 19.2 |
| Euroexpansão | 28 Oct 1995 | 45.7 | 26.3 | 13.0 | 5.5 | —N/a | 8.1 | 19.4 |
| 1995 legislative election | 1 Oct 1995 | 43.8; 112 | 34.1; 88 | 9.1; 15 | 8.6; 15 | —N/a | 4.4; 0 | 9.7 |

== Results ==
=== National summary ===
| Party | Votes | % | +/– | Seats | +/– |
|---|---|---|---|---|---|
| Socialist Party | 2,385,922 | 44.06 | +0.30 | 115 | +3 |
| Social Democratic Party | 1,750,158 | 32.32 | –1.80 | 81 | –7 |
| Unitary Democratic Coalition (Note: Portuguese Communist Party (15 MPs) and "The Greens" (2 MPs) ran in coalition.) | 487,058 | 8.99 | +0.42 | 17 | +2 |
| CDS – People's Party | 451,643 | 8.34 | –0.71 | 15 | 0 |
| Left Bloc | 132,333 | 2.44 | +1.23 | 2 | +2 |
| Portuguese Workers' Communist Party | 40,006 | 0.74 | +0.04 | 0 | 0 |
| Earth Party | 19,938 | 0.37 | +0.23 | 0 | 0 |
| People's Monarchist Party | 16,522 | 0.31 | +0.21 | 0 | 0 |
| National Solidarity Party | 11,488 | 0.21 | –0.00 | 0 | 0 |
| Humanist Party | 7,346 | 0.14 | New | 0 | New |
| Workers' Party of Socialist Unity | 4,104 | 0.08 | +0.04 | 0 | 0 |
| Democratic Party of the Atlantic (Note: Democratic Party of the Atlantic electoral list only in Azores.) | 438 | 0.01 | –0.03 | 0 | 0 |
| Total | 5,306,956 | 100.00 | – | 230 | 0 |
| Valid votes | 5,306,956 | 98.00 | –0.08 | | |
| Invalid votes | 51,230 | 0.95 | –0.19 | | |
| Blank votes | 56,964 | 1.05 | +0.27 | | |
| Total votes | 5,415,150 | 100.00 | – | | |
| Registered voters/turnout | 8,864,604 | 61.09 | –5.21 | | |
Source: Comissão Nacional de Eleições

Vote share
| PS | 44.06% |
| PSD | 32.32% |
| CDU | 8.99% |
| CDS-PP | 8.34% |
| BE | 2.44% |
| PCTP/MRPP | 0.74% |
| Others | 1.12% |
| Blank/Invalid | 2.00% |

Parliamentary seats
| PS | 50.00% |
| PSD | 35.22% |
| CDU | 7.39% |
| CDS-PP | 6.52% |
| BE | 0.87% |

=== Distribution by constituency ===
Results of the 1999 election of the Portuguese Assembly of the Republic by constituency
| Constituency | % | S | % | S | % | S | % | S | % | S | Total S |
| Constituency | PS | | PSD | | CDU | | CDS–PP | | BE | | Total S |
|---|---|---|---|---|---|---|---|---|---|---|---|
| Azores | 53.3 | 3 | 35.8 | 2 | 1.7 | - | 5.6 | - | 1.1 | - | 5 |
| Aveiro | 40.2 | 7 | 38.3 | 6 | 3.5 | - | 13.6 | 2 | 1.3 | - | 15 |
| Beja | 46.7 | 2 | 14.5 | - | 28.3 | 1 | 3.9 | - | 1.6 | - | 3 |
| Braga | 44.3 | 8 | 36.7 | 7 | 5.4 | 1 | 8.9 | 1 | 1.2 | - | 17 |
| Bragança | 39.7 | 2 | 45.1 | 2 | 2.6 | - | 8.7 | - | 0.8 | - | 4 |
| Castelo Branco | 51.6 | 3 | 32.0 | 2 | 5.3 | - | 6.3 | - | 1.2 | - | 5 |
| Coimbra | 47.2 | 6 | 35.2 | 4 | 6.1 | - | 6.0 | - | 2.0 | - | 10 |
| Évora | 45.7 | 2 | 18.7 | 1 | 24.6 | 1 | 5.1 | - | 1.5 | - | 4 |
| Faro | 48.4 | 5 | 29.5 | 3 | 8.3 | - | 7.3 | - | 2.3 | - | 8 |
| Guarda | 43.4 | 2 | 39.2 | 2 | 3.2 | - | 9.8 | - | 1.1 | - | 4 |
| Leiria | 36.8 | 4 | 42.6 | 5 | 5.3 | - | 9.9 | 1 | 1.7 | - | 10 |
| Lisbon | 42.7 | 23 | 27.3 | 14 | 12.3 | 6 | 8.5 | 4 | 4.9 | 2 | 49 |
| Madeira | 35.1 | 2 | 46.2 | 3 | 2.8 | - | 10.9 | - | 1.2 | - | 5 |
| Portalegre | 51.2 | 2 | 22.5 | 1 | 15.0 | - | 5.9 | - | 1.2 | - | 3 |
| Porto | 48.0 | 19 | 32.7 | 13 | 6.2 | 2 | 7.5 | 3 | 2.3 | - | 37 |
| Santarém | 45.5 | 5 | 30.2 | 3 | 10.1 | 1 | 8.1 | 1 | 2.0 | - | 10 |
| Setúbal | 43.7 | 8 | 18.0 | 3 | 24.8 | 5 | 5.6 | 1 | 3.5 | - | 17 |
| Viana do Castelo | 40.2 | 3 | 35.8 | 2 | 5.0 | - | 14.0 | 1 | 1.2 | - | 6 |
| Vila Real | 40.8 | 2 | 45.5 | 3 | 2.4 | - | 6.8 | - | 0.8 | - | 5 |
| Viseu | 38.1 | 4 | 44.3 | 4 | 2.2 | - | 10.5 | 1 | 1.2 | - | 9 |
| Europe | 55.4 | 2 | 24.7 | - | 5.3 | - | 3.2 | - | 0.6 | - | 2 |
| Outside Europe | 39.8 | 1 | 49.5 | 1 | 1.7 | - | 3.5 | - | 0.4 | - | 2 |
| Total | 44.1 | 115 | 32.3 | 81 | 9.0 | 17 | 8.3 | 15 | 2.4 | 2 | 230 |
Source: Comissão Nacional de Eleições

=== Maps ===
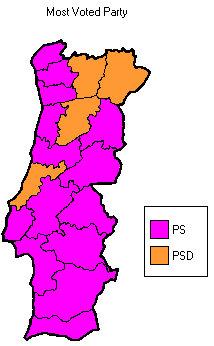
Most voted political force by district. (Madeira and Azores not shown)

Winner and seats by constituency.

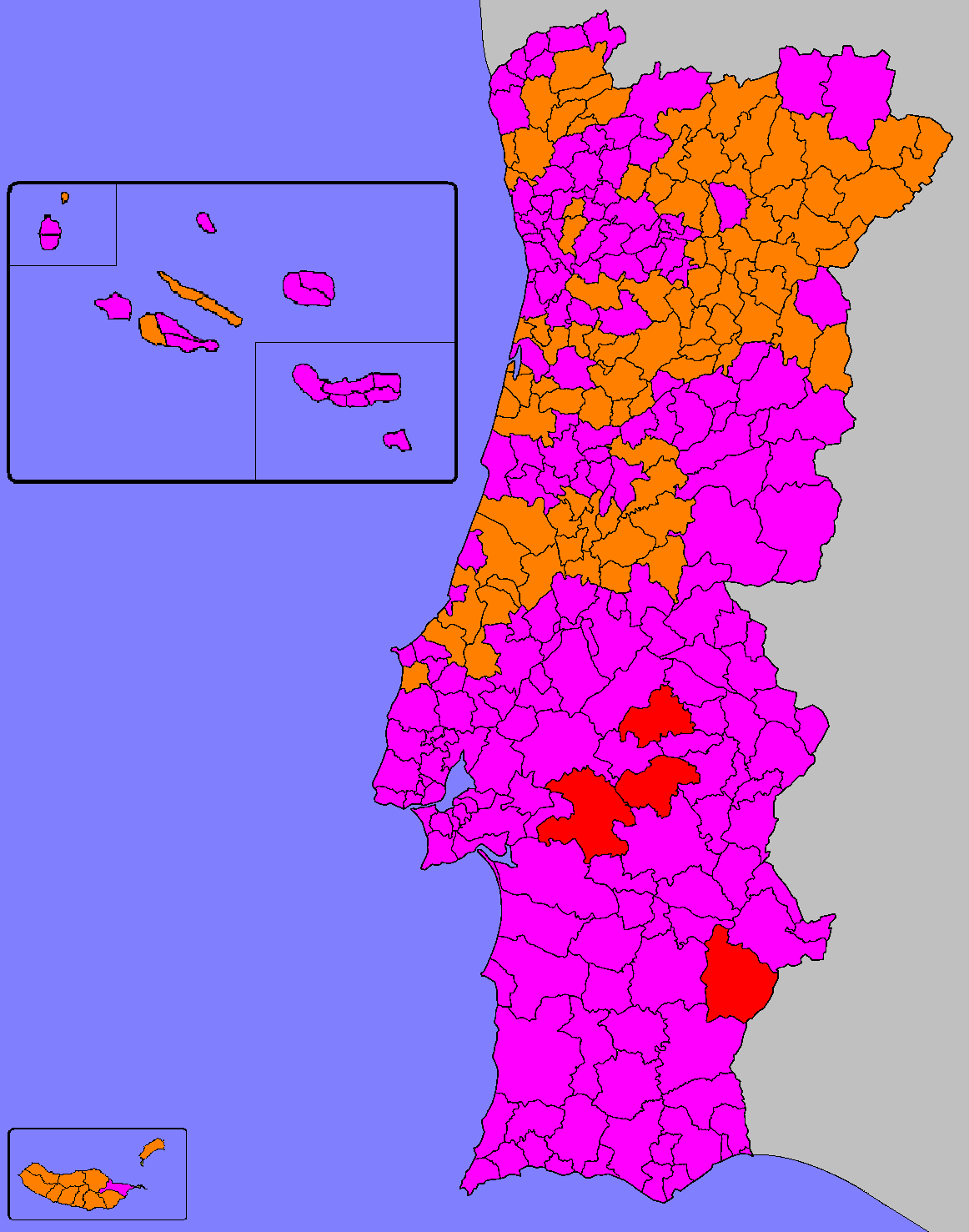
Most voted political force by municipality.

== Aftermath ==
Guterres second government was haunted by its failure in winning an absolute majority in the 1999 election. The tie between the Government and the opposition created a series of problems to Guterres as all opposition parties, PSD, CDU, CDS–PP and BE, refused to negotiate with the Government. Despite this, in the 2000 budget vote, CDS–PP decided to abstain and the budget passed:

2000 State Budget; António Guterres (PS)
| Ballot → | 15 March 2000 |
| Required majority → | Simple |
| Yes: • PS (115) | 115 / 230 |
| No: • PSD (81); • PCP (15); • PEV (2); • BE (2) | 100 / 230 |
| Abstentions: • CDS–PP (15) | 15 / 230 |
| Absentees | 0 / 230 |
| Result → | Approved |

However, after the 2000 budget, CDS–PP was no longer willing to support Guterres and, the solution found was a controversial one: With a sole CDS–PP MP, Daniel Campelo, Guterres secured the approval of his two following annual State Budgets in exchange for the government financing a cheese factory in Campelo's hometown of Ponte de Lima, Viana do Castelo district, as well as other supports for the same region. Campelo was ultimately suspended from CDS–PP, and from November 2000 onwards, sat as an Independent.

2001 State Budget; António Guterres (PS)
| Ballot → | 29 November 2000 |
| Required majority → | Simple |
| Yes: • PS (115) | 115 / 230 |
| No: • PSD (81); • PCP (15); • CDS–PP (14); • PEV (2); • BE (2) | 114 / 230 |
| Abstentions: • Ind. Daniel Campelo (1) | 1 / 230 |
| Absentees | 0 / 230 |
| Result → | Approved |

2002 State Budget; António Guterres (PS)
| Ballot → | 30 November 2001 |
| Required majority → | Simple |
| Yes: • PS (115) | 115 / 230 |
| No: • PSD (81); • PCP (15); • CDS–PP (14); • PEV (2); • BE (2) | 114 / 230 |
| Abstentions: • Ind. Daniel Campelo (1) | 1 / 230 |
| Absentees | 0 / 230 |
| Result → | Approved |

=== Fall of the government ===
Besides his fragile majority to approve major legislation, Guterres also suffered with a lot of instability within his own cabinet, with two reshuffles in just four months during 2001. The Hintze Ribeiro Bridge collapse generated public anger against the government, which eroded even more Guterres' popularity. Furthermore, by mid-2001, the economy was showing strong signs of slowdown, in a time when Portugal was about to enter into the Euro common currency and was suffering from the global impact of the September 11 attacks. All these problems culminated in the December 2001 local elections, where the PS suffered a big defeat and saw major urban centers, mainly Lisbon and Porto, swing dramatically to the right-wing. In response to these results, Guterres announced his resignation as Prime Minister, justifying his decision as a way to avoid a "political swamp". President Jorge Sampaio dissolved Parliament and called an election for 17 March 2002.

== See also ==
- Politics of Portugal
- List of political parties in Portugal
- Elections in Portugal
