= Humanist Party (Portugal) =

The Humanist Party (Portuguese: Partido Humanista, pronounced [pɐɾˈtiðu umɐˈniʃtɐ]; the acronym PH was used in voting ballots) was a minor centre-left former political party in Portugal. The party was established in March 1999. It never elected representatives to the Assembly of the Republic, the Portuguese legislature.

The party, now only a political and civic movement after dissolving itself as a party in September 2015, is member of the Humanist International.
