= 2015 Portuguese legislative election =

Legislative election held in Portugal

- 4 October 2015

All 230 seats in the Assembly of the Republic 116 seats needed for a majority
- Opinion polls
- Registered: 9,684,922 ▲0.6%
- Turnout: 5,408,092 (55.8%) ▼2.2 pp
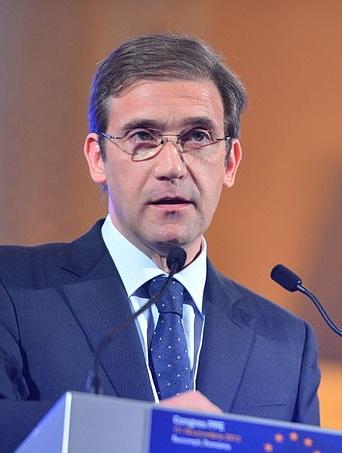

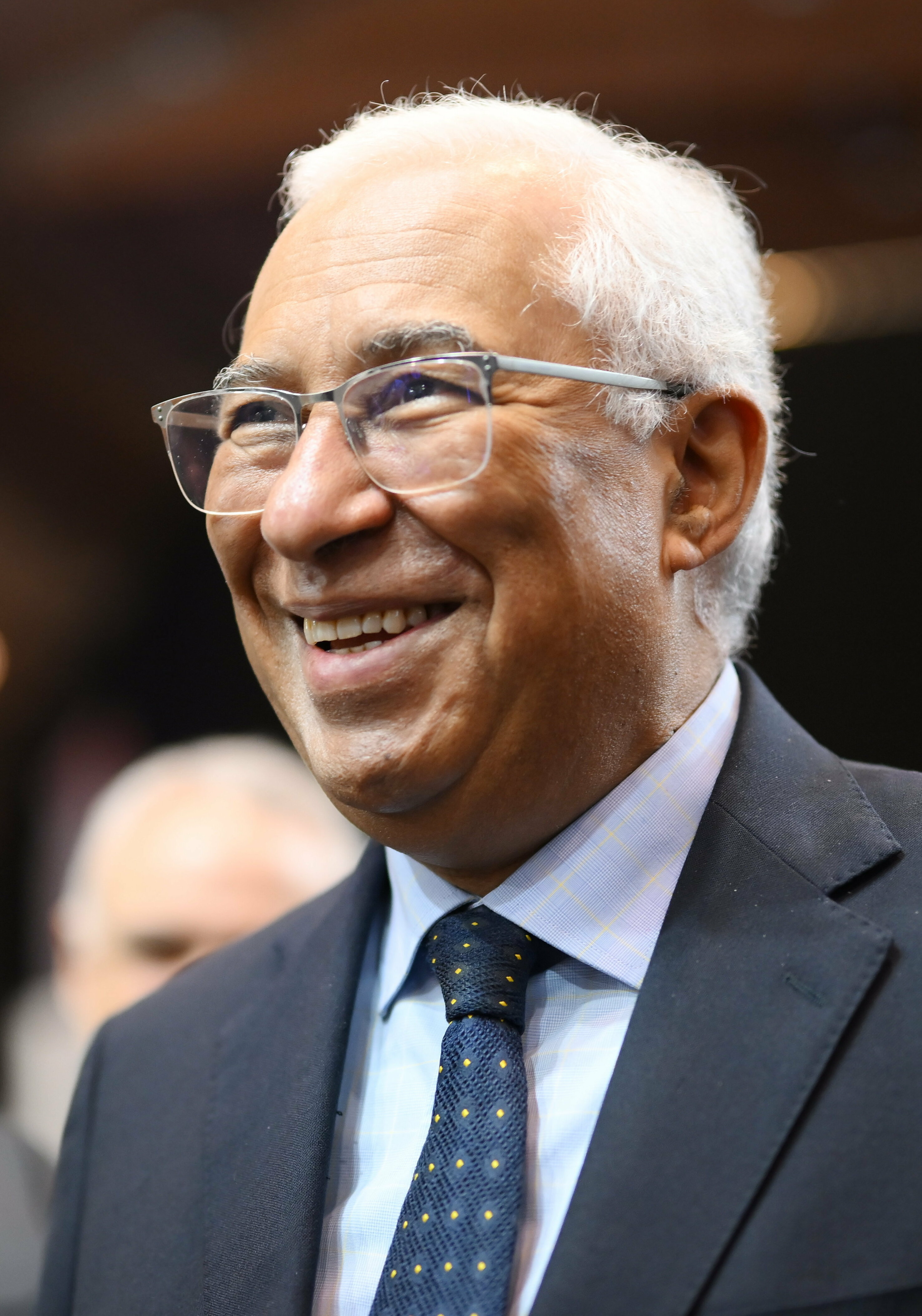

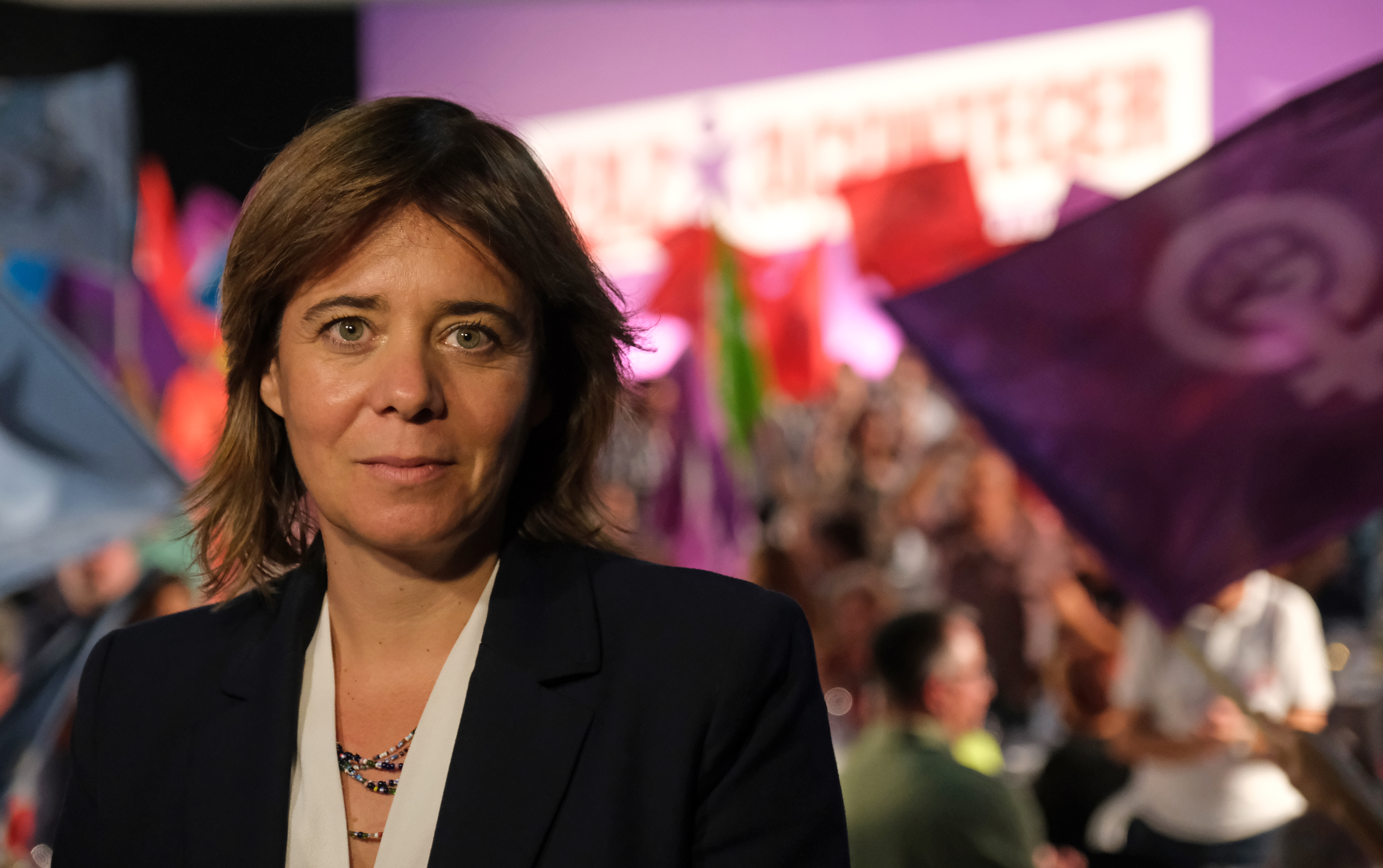

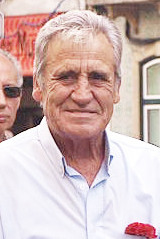

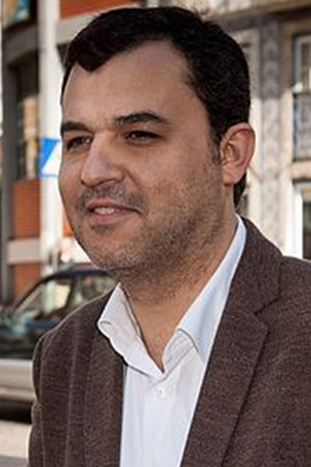
	First party	Second party	Third party
Leader	Pedro Passos Coelho	António Costa	Catarina Martins
Party	PSD	PS	BE
Alliance	PàF
Leader since	26 March 2010 (Note: As leader of the Social Democratic Party (PSD). The leader of the People's Party (CDS–PP) is the deputy prime minister Paulo Portas.)	28 September 2014	30 November 2014
Leader's seat	Lisbon (Note: In the 2011 election, Pedro Passos Coelho was elected in the district of Vila Real.)	Lisbon	Porto
Last election	132 seats, 50.4% (Note: Sum of votes and seats of the PSD and the CDS–PP in the 2011 election. PSD: 38.7%, 108 seats; CDS–PP: 11.7%, 24 seats.)	74 seats, 28.0%	8 seats, 5.2%
Seats won	107	86	19
Seat change	▼25	▲12	▲11
Popular vote	2,085,465	1,747,730	550,945
Percentage	38.6%	32.3%	10.2%
Swing	▼11.8 pp	▲4.3 pp	▲5.0 pp
	Fourth party	Fifth party
Leader	Jerónimo de Sousa	André Silva
Party	PCP	PAN
Alliance	CDU
Leader since	27 November 2004	26 October 2014
Leader's seat	Lisbon	Lisbon
Last election	16 seats, 7.9%	0 seats, 1.0%
Seats won	17	1
Seat change	▲1	▲1
Popular vote	445,901	75,170
Percentage	8.3%	1.4%
Swing	▲0.4 pp	▲0.4 pp
- PSD ran alone in the Azores and Madeira.
Prime Minister before election
Pedro Passos Coelho
PSD
Prime Minister after election
Pedro Passos Coelho
PSD
(20 October - 26 November 2015) (Note: Following the election, Pedro Passos Coelho was first designated as Prime Minister by the President of the Republic with a PSD/CDS-PP minority government. He took the oath of office for his second term on October 30, 2015. On 10 November 2015, Coelho's government was defeated in a motion of no confidence vote, 123 against 107, prompting the fall of his government. The President of the Republic, Aníbal Cavaco Silva, then invited PS leader António Costa to form a minority government with the support of BE and CDU. Costa's minority government was sworn in on 26 November 2015.)
António Costa
PS

The 2015 Portuguese legislative election was held on 4 October. All 230 seats of the Assembly of the Republic were in contention.

The right-wing coalition Portugal Ahead (PàF), composed of the Social Democratic Party (PSD) and the People's Party (CDS–PP), won a plurality of the vote with 38.6 percent, securing almost 47 percent of the seats in the Assembly. Compared with 2011, this was a loss of 12 points in support (although the PSD and the CDS–PP did not contest the 2011 election in coalition). On the electoral map, the coalition won every district in the North and in the Centre except Castelo Branco. They also won in the big districts of Lisbon and Porto. The map showed a clear north–south divide, with the conservative coalition winning almost everything in the North and Centre and the Socialist Party (PS) winning in the South.

The PS was the second most voted political force, winning 32.3 percent of the vote and 37 percent of the seats in the Parliament. The PS received a higher share of the vote than in 2011, but did not increase its share by as much of a margin as had been predicted by the opinion polls prior to September 2015, with António Costa, former mayor of Lisbon, even failing to win the city of Lisbon. Although the PS and the other left-wing parties did win a clear overall majority in Parliament, in his concession speech Costa said that he would not support "a negative coalition" with the Left Bloc and Communist Party and that he would rather talk and negotiate with the PSD/CDS–PP coalition. (a position he would later retract.)

The Left Bloc (BE), despite predictions by opinion polls, achieved its best result in history, with more than 10 percent of the vote, becoming the third largest parliamentary group. The CDU's (Communists and Greens) share of the vote increased slightly compared to 2011, receiving 8 percent of the vote and one additional MP. The People-Animals-Nature (PAN) also elected one member of parliament becoming the first time since 1999 in which a new party entered the Assembly. Voter turnout reached a new low, with just 55.8 percent of the electorate casting their ballot on election day.

Passos Coelho was asked, by the President of the Republic, to form a minority government that took the oath of office on October 30, 2015. The government fell after the approval of a motion to bring it down on 10 November. On 24 November, António Costa was appointed by the President of the Republic as Prime Minister-designate. Costa was sworn in on 26 November 2015.

== Background ==
After the PSD/CDS–PP government was sworn in, a series of austerity policies, in the wake of the financial bailout agreement, were implemented, creating several backlash and protests. In September 2012, further austerity policies led to one of the biggest demonstrations against a government in Portuguese democracy, with more than 1 million people going out to the streets across the country. Because of this massive protest, the coalition government was deeply shaken and was forced to drop several policies.

By the summer of 2013, another crisis in the coalition government emerged. The Finance Minister Vítor Gaspar resigned in late June 2013, and Prime Minister Pedro Passos Coelho choose treasury Secretary, Maria Luís Albuquerque, to be the next Finance minister. However, CDS – People's Party (CDS-PP) leader, Paulo Portas, criticized the choice of the new minister and announced his "irrevocable" resignation from the government. Prime Minister Passos Coelho didn't accept Portas' resignation and refused also to leave office, opting, instead, to negotiate a new government organization with Portas. A deal was reached a few days later, in which Portas would become deputy prime minister and with more powers on economic affairs. But, President Aníbal Cavaco Silva refused to accept the deal and forced negotiations between PSD and PS, in which a deal between parties to maintain economic stability and a snap election in 2014 were on the table. Despite presidential pressure, talks between PSD and PS fell apart and Cavaco Silva was forced to accept the PSD/CDS–PP original deal.

The Social Democrats (PSD) suffered a considerable setback in the 2013 local elections by gathering just 31 percent of the votes and 106 mayors, a drop of 33 cities, while the Socialists (PS) obtained their best result till that date, 150 mayors, a gain of 18, with almost 37 percent of the votes. In May 2014, Portugal was successful in exiting the economic bailout that was negotiated in 2011, with the country having emerged from recession by mid-2013. The collapse and subsequent resolution of BES bank during the summer of 2014 also had an impact on the government. Furthermore, in the autumn of 2014, suspicions of tax evasion fell upon Prime Minister Passos Coelho during his time working in the private sector. These suspicions would be dismissed a few years later.

=== Leadership changes and challenges ===
==== Socialist Party ====
After José Sócrates resignation from the party's leadership, due to the poor result of the Socialists in the 2011 election, a snap leadership election was called to elect a new leader for 22 and 23 July 2011. There were two candidates on the ballot: António José Seguro and Francisco Assis. Seguro was elected by a landslide and the results were the following:

Ballot: 22 and 23 July 2011
Candidate	Votes	%
António José Seguro	23,903	67.3
Francisco Assis	11,257	31.7
Blank/Invalid ballots	367	1.0
Turnout	35,527	
Source: Official results

Two years later, in April 2013, Seguro was challenged by party member Aires Pedro to the leadership. There were 43,034 party members registered to cast a ballot, and Seguro was easily re-elected with nearly 97% of the votes, against the just 3% for Pedro.

Ballot: 13 April 2013
Candidate	Votes	%
António José Seguro	24,843	93.0
Aires Pedro	892	3.3
Blank/Invalid ballots	990	3.7
Turnout	26,725	62.10
Source: Diretas 2013

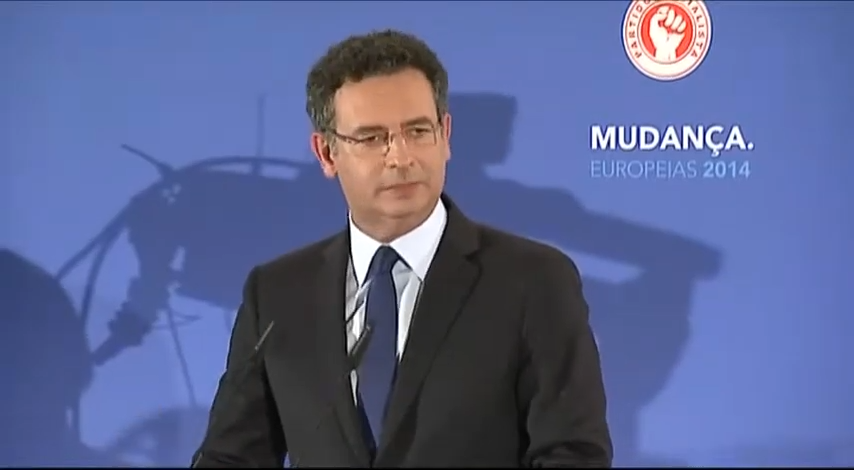
Seguro reacting to the 2014 European Parliament election results

Seguro's leadership was constantly marred by internal infighting, coming mainly from then Mayor of Lisbon António Costa, which despite forging a deal with Seguro to not challenge him for the leadership in early 2013, Costa never really ended speculations about it. Following the party's disappointing result in the 2014 European Parliament elections, in which the PS got just 31 percent of the votes against the 28 percent of the PSD/CDS coalition, António Costa called the results "tiny" (poucochinho), and challenged António José Seguro for the leadership. Seguro rejected a leadership ballot, but called an open primary, for 28 September 2014, on who should be the party's candidate for prime minister in the 2015 election. It was the first open primary in the history of the party, and of Portugal. In end, only two candidates ran: António José Seguro, General Secretary of the party at the time of the primary, and António Costa, mayor of Lisbon. Nearly 250,000 people registered to cast a ballot in the primary. António Costa won the primary by a landslide with 67.9 percent of the vote against the 31.7 percent of Antonio José Seguro, resulting in Seguro conceding defeat and resigning as General Secretary of the party. Thereafter, Costa was elected as the new Socialist General Secretary on 22 November 2014. The results were the following:

Ballot: 28 September 2014
Candidate	Votes	%
António Costa	120,188	67.8
António José Seguro	55,928	31.5
Blank/Invalid ballots	1,234	0.7
Turnout	177,350	70.71
Source: Official Results

The start of António Costa's term as PS leader was, however, marred by the arrest of former Socialist Prime Minister José Sócrates on 21 November 2014, due to an inquiry which accused the former prime minister of crimes of tax fraud, money laundering and corruption.

==== Left Bloc ====
One year after the disappointing results of the party in the 2011 elections, the then Left Bloc leader, Francisco Louçã, decided to leave the leadership and a party convention was held to elect a new leader. In November 2012, the party elected a dual leadership headed by João Semedo and Catarina Martins.

Ballot: 30 November 2012
Candidate	Votes	%
João Semedo; Catarina Martins	359	76.5
João Madeira	110	23.5
Turnout	469	
Source: Results

However, bad polling and election results, specially the 2014 European elections results, put pressure in the party's leadership, and a new party convention, in 2014, showed a very divided party as the dual leadership of Semedo and Martins was reelected by a very slim margin. The results were the following:

Ballot: 23 November 2014
Candidate	Votes	%
João Semedo; Catarina Martins	266	50.8
Pedro Filipe Soares	258	49.2
Turnout	524	
Source: Results

Just 7 days after the very close result in the party's convention, on 30 November 2014, João Semedo resigned as party coordinator and Catarina Martins became to sole party coordinator.

=== Date ===
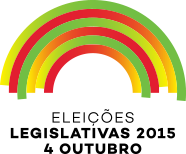
Official logo of the election.

According to the Portuguese Constitution, an election must be called between 14 September and 14 October of the year that the legislature ends. The election is called by the President of Portugal but is not called at the request of the prime minister; however, the president must listen all the parties represented in Parliament and the election day must be announced at least 60 days before the election. If an election is called in the middle of the legislature (Dissolution of Parliament) it must be held at least in 55 days. Election day is the same in all multi-seats constituencies, and should fall on a Sunday or national holiday. The next legislative election must, therefore, took place no later than 11 October 2015. After meeting with all of the parties represented in parliament on 21 July 2015, the President Aníbal Cavaco Silva called the election for 4 October.

=== Electoral system ===
The Assembly of the Republic has 230 members elected to four-year terms. Governments do not require absolute majority support of the Assembly to hold office, as even if the number of opposers of government is larger than that of the supporters, the number of opposers still needs to be equal or greater than 116 (absolute majority) for both the Government's Programme to be rejected or for a motion of no confidence to be approved.

The number of seats assigned to each district depends on the district magnitude. The use of the d'Hondt method makes for a higher effective threshold than certain other allocation methods such as the Hare quota or Sainte-Laguë method, which are more generous to small parties.

For these elections, and compared with the 2011 elections, the MPs distributed by districts were the following:

District	Number of MPs	Map
Lisbon	47	
Porto	39	
Braga	19	
Setúbal^{(+1)}	18	
Aveiro	16	
Leiria	10	
Coimbra, Faro, Viseu and Santarém^{(–1)}	9	
Madeira and Viana do Castelo	6	
Azores and Vila Real	5	
Castelo Branco and Guarda	4	
Beja, Bragança, Évora	3	
Portalegre, Europe and Outside Europe	2	

== Parties ==
=== Parliamentary factions ===
The table below lists the parties represented in the Assembly of the Republic during the 12th legislature (2011–2015):

Name		Ideology	Political position	Leader	2011 result	
Name		Ideology	Political position	Leader	%	Seats
PPD/PSD	Social Democratic Party; Partido Social Democrata	Conservatism; Classical liberalism	Centre-right	Pedro Passos Coelho	38.7%	108 / 230
PS	Socialist Party; Partido Socialista	Social democracy Progressivism	Centre-left	António Costa	28.1%	74 / 230
CDS–PP	CDS – People's Party; Centro Democrático e Social – Partido Popular	Christian democracy Conservatism	Centre-right to right-wing	Paulo Portas	11.7%	24 / 230
PCP	Portuguese Communist Party; Partido Comunista Português	Communism; Marxism–Leninism	Far-left	Jerónimo de Sousa	7.9% (Note: The Portuguese Communist Party (PCP) and the Ecologist Party "The Greens" (PEV) contested the 2011 election in a coalition called Unitary Democratic Coalition (CDU) and won a combined 7.9% of the vote and elected 16 MPs to parliament.)	14 / 230
PEV	Ecologist Party "The Greens"; Partido Ecologista "Os Verdes"	Eco-socialism; Green politics	Left-wing	Heloísa Apolónia	7.9%	2 / 230
BE	Left Bloc; Bloco de Esquerda	Democratic socialism Anti-capitalism	Left-wing	Catarina Martins	5.2%	8 / 230

=== Contesting parties ===
For the election, PSD and CDS–PP ran in a joint coalition, announced in April 2015, while another coalition, between the Portuguese Labour Party (PTP) and the Socialist Alternative Movement (MAS), was approved in July 2015. The parties and coalitions that contested seats to the Portuguese parliament, and their leaders, were:

Political party	Leader	Political spectrum	Political groups of the European Parliament
Portugal Ahead (Portugal à Frente) • Social Democratic Party (PSD) • CDS – People's Party (CDS–PP)	Pedro Passos Coelho	Centre-right to Right-wing	European People's Party Group (EPP)
Socialist Party (PS)	António Costa	Centre-left	Progressive Alliance of Socialists and Democrats (S&D)
Unitary Democratic Coalition (CDU) • Portuguese Communist Party (PCP) • Ecologist Party "The Greens" (PEV)	Jerónimo de Sousa	Left-wing	European United Left–Nordic Green Left (GUE/NGL)
Left Bloc (BE)	Catarina Martins	Left-wing	European United Left–Nordic Green Left (GUE/NGL)
Portuguese Workers' Communist Party (PCTP-MRPP)	António Garcia Pereira	Far-left	-
Earth Party (MPT)	José Inácio Faria	Centre-right	Alliance of Liberals and Democrats for Europe Group (ALDE/ADLE)
People-Animals-Nature (PAN)	André Silva	Centre-left	-
National Renovator Party (PNR)	José Pinto Coelho	Far-right	-
We, the Citizens! (NC)	Mendo Castro Henriques	Centre to Centre-right	-
LIVRE/Tempo de Avançar (L/TDA)	Rui Tavares	Centre-left to Left-wing	-
Democratic Republican Party (PDR)	António Marinho e Pinto	Centre	Alliance of Liberals and Democrats for Europe Group (ALDE/ADLE)
ACT! (AGIR) • Portuguese Labour Party (PTP) • Socialist Alternative Movement (MAS)	Joana Amaral Dias	Centre-left to Far-left	-
People's Monarchist Party (PPM)	Paulo Estevão	Right-wing	-
Christian Democratic and Citizenship (CDC/PPV)	Tânia Avillez	Right-wing	-
United Party of Retirees and Pensioners (PURP)	António Mateus Dias	Big tent	-
Together for the People (JPP)	Filipe Sousa	Centre	-

== Campaign period ==
=== Issues ===
The campaign was dominated by the country's economic situation, after fours years of strong austerity measures, being seen as a referendum to the government's policies and the recent economic recovery, with the country emerging from the bailout in May 2014. The Socialist Party's campaign was also marked by a controversy regarding its election posters, as the party used people's faces on their campaign posters without their consent or knowledge, and made up stories that did not match the reality of the people portrayed.

=== Party slogans ===
Party or alliance	Original slogan	English translation	Refs
PàF	« Agora Portugal pode mais »	"Now Portugal can do more"	
PS	« É tempo de confiança »	"It's time for trust"	
CDU	« Soluções para um Portugal com futuro »	"Solutions for a Portugal with a future"	
BE	« Faz a diferença. Gente de verdade »	"Make a difference. Real people"	
PAN	« A causa de todos »	"The cause of all"	

=== Candidates' debates ===
After changes in the electoral law that obligated that all of the parties contesting an election should be represented in debates, the 3 main TV networks RTP, SIC and TVI proposed 3 debates between the two main candidates António Costa and Pedro Passos Coelho and also a series of head-to-head debates between various party leaders and one debate with all party leaders. After meetings with the various parties, it was decided to hold two face-to-face debates between António Costa and Pedro Passos Coelho in which one would be broadcast on television and the other on radio. There was also going to be a debate between all the parties represented in Parliament but it was cancelled by the refusal of the PSD/CDS–PP coalition to have only the leader of the PSD on the debate and not also the leader of CDS–PP, Paulo Portas.

Completed televised debates:

Portuguese legislative election debates, 2015
N°.	Date	Broadcaster	Moderator(s)	Invitees				Notes
Name Invited Participant. N Non-invitee.				PàF	PS	CDU	BE	Notes
1	1 September	RTP Informação	Vítor Gonçalves	N	N	Jerónimo	Martins	
2	8 September	SIC Notícias	Ana Lourenço	Portas	N	N	Martins	
3	9 September	RTP1; SIC; TVI	Judite de Sousa; Clara de Sousa; João Adelino Faria	P. Coelho	Costa	N	N	Broadcast simultaneously on the 3 major TV networks.
4	11 September	RTP Informação	Vítor Gonçalves	P. Coelho	N	N	Martins	
5	14 September	TVI24	Pedro Pinto	N	Costa	N	Martins	
6	16 September	SIC Notícias	Ana Lourenço	N	Costa	Jerónimo	N	
7	17 September	Antena 1 RR; TSF	Graça Franco; Maria Flor Pedroso; Paulo Baldaia	P. Coelho	Costa	N	N	Broadcast simultaneously on 3 national radio stations.
8	18 September	TVI24	José Alberto Carvalho	Portas	N	Apolónia	N	
Candidate viewed as "most convincing" in each debate
Debate			Poll source	PàF	PS	CDU	BE	Notes
3	9 September	RTP1/SIC/TVI	Aximage	35.7	48.0			16.3% said it was a tie.
3	9 September	RTP1/SIC/TVI	Eurosondagem	31.8	40.0			28.2% said neither won or it was a tie.
7	17 September	Antena 1/RR/TSF	Marktest	42.5	29.5			14.2% said neither won and 13.8% were undecided.

== Opinion polling ==
View source data.

== Voter turnout ==
The table below shows voter turnout throughout election day including voters from Overseas.

Turnout	Time								
Turnout	12:00			16:00			19:00		
Turnout	2011	2015	±	2011	2015	±	2011	2015	±
Total	20.01%	20.65%	▲0.64 pp	41.98%	44.38%	▲2.40 pp	58.03%	55.84%	▼2.19 pp

== Results ==
The outcome showed a relative victory for the right-wing coalition, but also a combined one for the left-wing parties (including the Socialist Party), resulting in a hung parliament (a single right-wing winner and a left-wing majority parliament).

=== National summary ===
Party or alliance		Votes	%	+/–	Seats	+/–
Portugal Ahead	Portugal Ahead (Note: PSD/CDS–PP electoral lists only in continental Portugal and overseas.)	1,993,504	36.86	–10.98	102	–22
Portugal Ahead	Social Democratic Party (Note: Electoral list only in Madeira and Azores.)	80,841	1.49	–0.50	5	–2
Portugal Ahead	CDS – People's Party (Note: Electoral list only in Madeira.)	7,496	0.14	–0.20	0	–1
Portugal Ahead	Alliance Azores (Note: CDS–PP/PPM electoral list only in Azores.)	3,624	0.07	–0.13	0	0
Portugal Ahead	Total	2,085,465	38.56	–11.81	107	–25
Socialist Party		1,747,730	32.32	+4.27	86	+12
Left Bloc		550,945	10.19	+4.98	19	+11
Unitary Democratic Coalition		445,901	8.25	+0.35	17	+1
People Animals Nature		75,170	1.39	+0.35	1	+1
Democratic Republican Party		61,920	1.14	New	0	New
Portuguese Workers' Communist Party		60,045	1.11	–0.01	0	0
LIVRE/Time to move forward		39,330	0.73	New	0	New
National Renovator Party		27,286	0.50	+0.19	0	0
Earth Party		22,627	0.42	+0.01	0	0
We, the Citizens!		21,382	0.40	New	0	New
ACT! (Labour/Socialist Alternative)		20,793	0.38	—	0	—
People's Monarchist Party		14,916	0.28	+0.02	0	0
Together for the People		14,275	0.26	New	0	New
United Party of Retirees and Pensioners		13,899	0.26	New	0	New
Citizenship and Christian Democracy		2,685	0.05	–0.10	0	0
Portuguese Labour Party (Note: Electoral list only in Madeira.)		1,744	0.03	—	0	0
Total		5,206,113	100.00	–	230	0
Valid votes		5,206,113	96.27	+0.35		
Invalid votes		89,024	1.65	+0.23		
Blank votes		112,955	2.09	–0.57		
Total votes		5,408,092	100.00	–		
Registered voters/turnout		9,684,922	55.84	–2.19		
Source: Diário da República

Vote share
PàF	36.86%
PS	32.32%
BE	10.19%
CDU	8.25%
PSD	1.49%
PAN	1.39%
PDR	1.13%
PCTP/MRPP	1.11%
L/TDA	0.73%
PNR	0.50%
Others	2.29%
Blank/Invalid	3.74%

Parliamentary seats
PàF	44.35%
PS	37.39%
BE	8.26%
CDU	7.39%
PSD	2.17%
PAN	0.43%

=== Distribution by constituency ===
Results of the 2015 election of the Portuguese Assembly of the Republic by constituency
Constituency	%	S	%	S	%	S	%	S	%	S	%	S	Total S
Constituency	PàF		PS		BE		CDU		PSD		PAN		Total S
Azores			40.3	3	7.8	-	2.5	-	36.1	2	0.9	-	5
Aveiro	48.1	10	27.9	5	9.6	1	4.4	-			1.0	-	16
Beja	20.1	1	37.3	1	8.2	-	25.0	1			0.8	-	3
Braga	45.6	10	30.9	7	8.8	1	5.2	1			0.8	-	19
Bragança	49.4	2	34.1	1	5.5	-	3.1	-			0.6	-	3
Castelo Branco	35.3	2	38.9	2	10.0	-	6.0	-			0.8	-	4
Coimbra	37.2	4	35.3	4	9.9	1	7.0	-			1.0	-	9
Évora	23.9	1	37.5	1	8.6	-	21.9	1			0.9	-	3
Faro	31.5	3	32.8	4	14.1	1	8.7	1			2.0	-	9
Guarda	45.6	2	33.8	2	7.4	-	4.0	-			0.9	-	4
Leiria	48.4	6	24.8	3	9.7	1	5.1	-			1.2	-	10
Lisbon	34.7	18	33.5	18	10.9	5	9.8	5			2.0	1	47
Madeira			20.9	2	10.7	1	3.6	-	37.8	3	1.8	-	6
Portalegre	27.6	1	42.4	1	9.2	-	12.2	-			0.8	-	2
Porto	39.6	17	32.7	14	11.1	5	6.8	3			1.6	-	39
Santarém	35.8	4	32.9	3	10.8	1	9.6	1			1.2	-	9
Setúbal	22.6	5	34.3	7	13.1	2	18.8	4			1.9	-	18
Viana do Castelo	45.5	4	29.8	2	8.0	-	5.2	-			0.9	-	6
Vila Real	51.0	3	33.1	2	5.2	-	3.0	-			0.6	-	5
Viseu	51.1	6	29.7	3	6.7	-	3.5	-			0.7	-	9
Europe	39.1	1	29.9	1	5.8	-	5.9	-			0.9	-	2
Outside Europe	48.5	2	10.8	-	1.6	-	1.5	-			1.8	-	2
Total	36.9	102	32.3	86	10.2	19	8.3	17	1.5	5	1.4	1	230
Source: Legislativas 2015

=== Maps ===
Winner and seats by constituency.

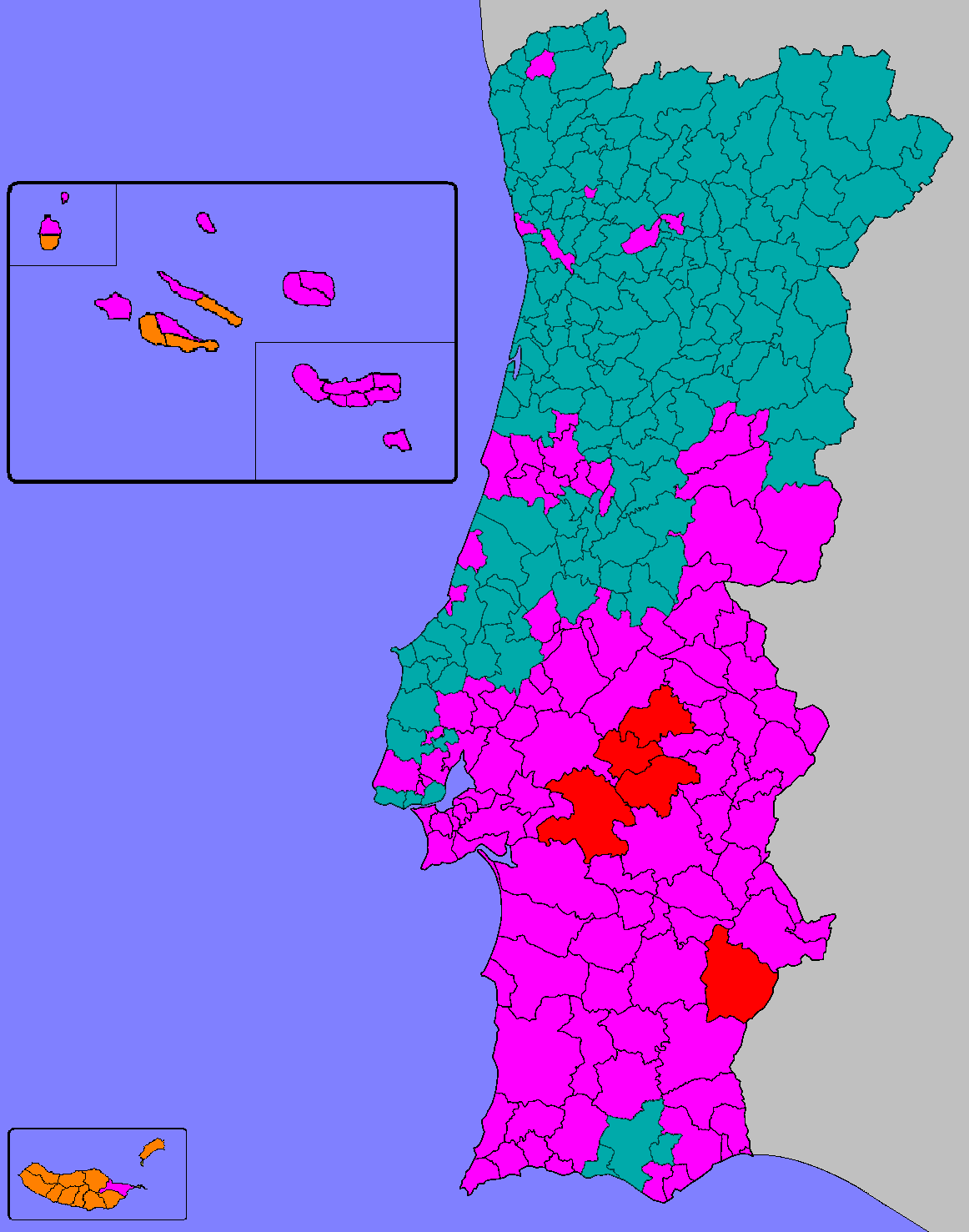
Most voted political force by municipality.

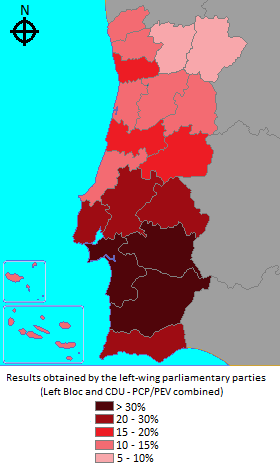
Percentage of votes for the left-wing parties represented in the Parliament, by district or autonomous region.

Most voted-for political fields by district/autonomous regions: Left: PS, BE, CDU; Right: PàF.

== Aftermath ==
=== Government formation ===
Despite Costa's statements during election night, the Socialists, the Left Bloc, the Communists and the Greens started negotiations to form a left-wing majority coalition government. After the election, the Secretary-General of the Socialist Party, António Costa, rejected the proposal for a post-election coalition government with the right-wing alliance PàF, adding that the Socialist Party would reject in Parliament any government that would be led by Pedro Passos Coelho or supported by the right-wing coalition Portugal Ahead. António Costa also guaranteed to President Aníbal Cavaco Silva that the Socialist Party had the conditions to form a government, supported in the parliament by the Left Bloc and the Communist Party. After being consulted by the President, the Socialist Party, the Left Bloc, the Communist Party and the Greens expressed their intention to support a government of the Socialist Party, led by António Costa.

Among the most likely scenarios that were considered for a new government were:

- A right-wing (PàF) minority government without the support of the Socialists (without majority support from the new parliament; rejected by Costa);
- A right-wing (PàF) minority government with the parliamentary support of the Socialists (rejected by Costa);
- A grand coalition government including the right-wing coalition (PàF) and the Socialists (rejected by Costa);
- A minority government of the Socialist Party with the parliamentary support of the Left Bloc and the Communists (most likely);
- A left-wing coalition government including the Socialists, the Left Bloc and the Communists;
- A caretaker government, until new elections are held, if the parties fail to reach an agreement.

On 22 October, President Aníbal Cavaco Silva controversially appointed Pedro Passos Coelho to form a new government, which after taking the oath of office had 10 days to submit its programme in Parliament. But the PS, BE and CDU had already stated that they would call a motion of rejection to bring down the government.

On 23 October, the new Assembly of the Republic was opened, with Eduardo Ferro Rodrigues, a Socialist, being elected as President of the Assembly with the support of the Socialists, the Communists, the Left Bloc and the Greens. He received 120 votes against 108 votes for the government's candidate.

The members of the second Passos Coelho government took office on 30 October, with the government's programme scheduled to be voted by Parliament on 10 November.

=== Fall of the government and appointment of a new one ===
Just before the parliamentary debate and vote on the government's programme, the Socialist Party reached an agreement with the three other left-wing parties: the Left Bloc, the Communists and the Greens. Those agreements were eventually approved by the national bodies of the Socialist Party on 8 November. On 10 November, the Portugal Ahead government programme was rejected by Parliament, after a motion of rejection was approved by 123 votes against and 107 in favor, bringing down the government itself:

Motion of Rejection; Pedro Passos Coelho (PSD)
Ballot →	10 November 2015
Required majority →	116 out of 230
Yes: • PS (86); • BE (19); • PCP (15); • PEV (2); • PAN (1)	123 / 230
No: • PSD (89); • CDS–PP (18)	107 / 230
Abstentions	0 / 230
Absentees	0 / 230
Result →	Approved

Fourteen days later, on 24 November, President Aníbal Cavaco Silva appointed António Costa, Socialist Party leader, as Prime Minister and a new government was sworn in, on 26 November, as a Socialist Party minority government with the confidence and supply of the Left Bloc, the Communist Party and the Ecologist Party "The Greens". On 2 and 3 December 2015, Costa's government programme was debated in the Assembly of the Republic, with PSD/CDS–PP presenting a motion of rejection that was defeated, and Costa's minority government entered into full exercise of its functions:

Motion of Rejection; António Costa (PS)
Ballot →	3 December 2015
Required majority →	116 out of 230
No: • PS (86); • BE (19); • PCP (15); • PEV (2)	122 / 230
Yes: • PSD (89); • CDS–PP (18)	107 / 230
Abstentions: • PAN (1)	1 / 230
Absentees	0 / 230
Result →	Rejected

== See also ==
- Elections in Portugal
- List of political parties in Portugal
- Politics of Portugal
