= 2021 Portuguese local elections =

- 26 September 2021

All 308 Portuguese municipalities and 3,092 Portuguese Parishes All 2,064 local government councils
- Opinion polls
- Turnout: 53.6% ▼1.3 pp
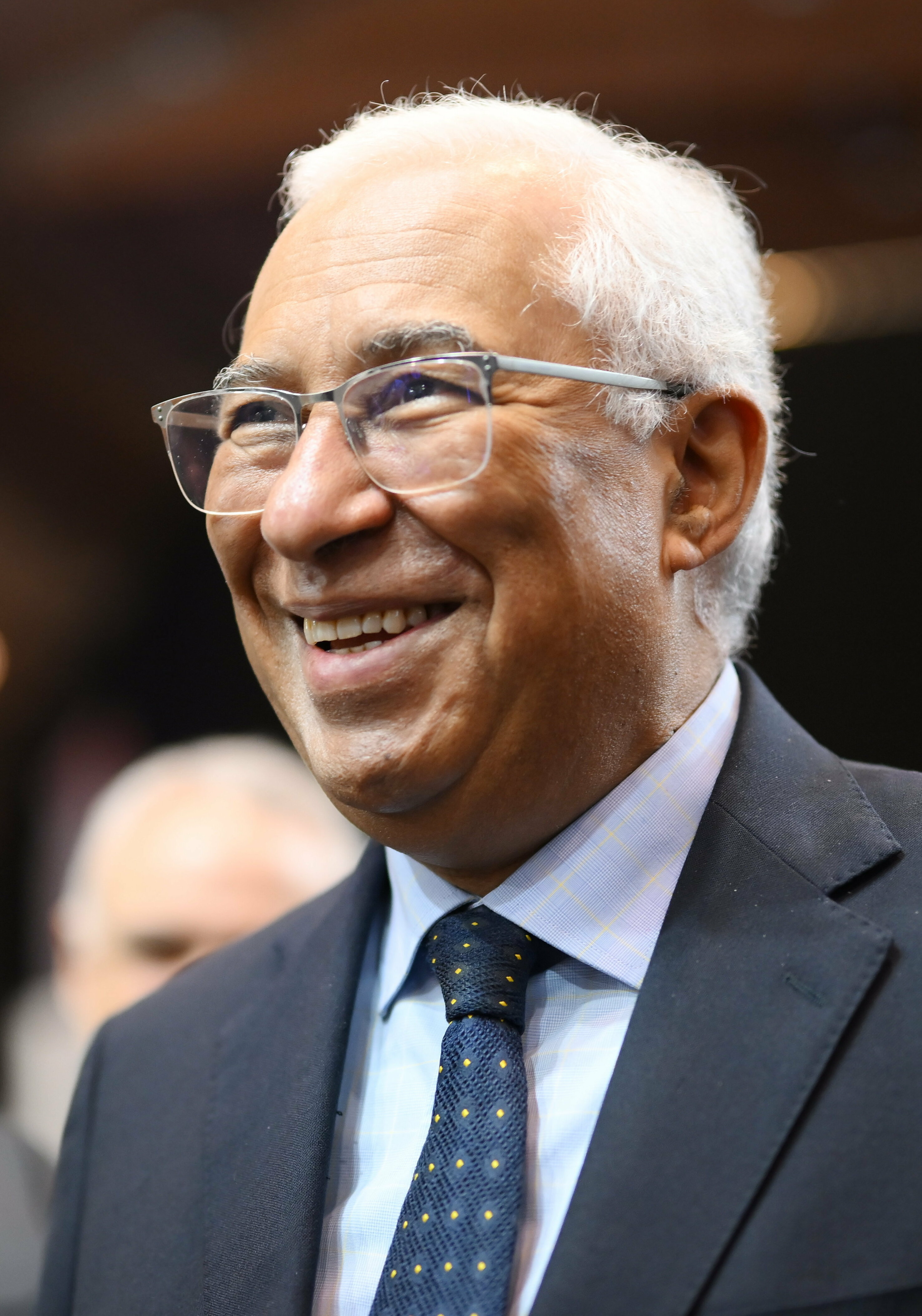

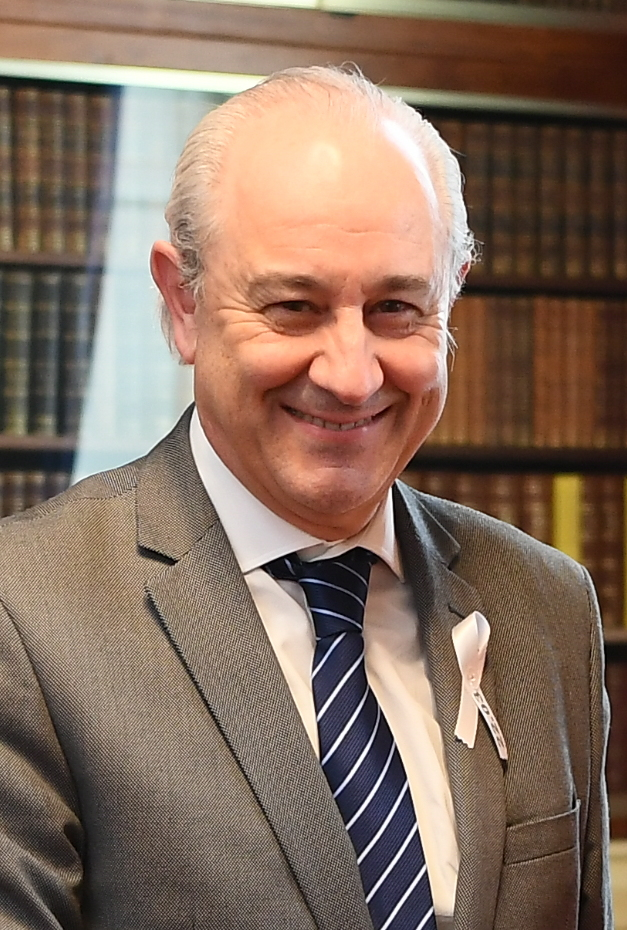

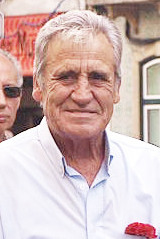
	First party	Second party	Third party
Leader	António Costa	Rui Rio	Jerónimo de Sousa
Party	PS	PSD	PCP
Alliance			CDU
Last election	160 mayors, 38.7%	98 mayors, 30.3%	24 mayors, 9.5%
Popular vote	1,854,960 (Note: Sum of votes between PS-only lists and lists with other parties.)	1,606,392 (Note: Sum of votes between PSD-only lists and lists with other parties.)	410,666
Percentage	37.1%	32.1%	8.2%
Swing	▼1.6 pp	▲1.8 pp	▼1.3 pp
Mayors	148 (Note: Number of municipalities won between PS-only lists and lists with other parties. PS-only lists: 148; PS-coalition lists: 0.)	114 (Note: Number of municipalities won between PSD-only lists and lists with other parties. PSD-only lists: 72; PSD-coalition lists: 42.)	19
Mayors +/–	▼12	▲16	▼5
Councillors	909 (Note: This accounts for seats won on PS-only lists and lists with other parties.)	793 (Note: This accounts for seats won on PSD-only lists and lists with other parties.)	148
Councillors +/–	▼54	▲64	▼23

Local elections in Portugal were held on 26 September 2021. The election consisted of three separate elections in the 308 Portuguese municipalities: the election for the Municipal Chamber (the executive branch of the municipality); another election for the Municipal Assembly (the deliberative branch of the municipality); and an election for the Parish Assembly (the deliberative branch of the lower-level parish), whose winner is elected parish president. This last one was held separately in the more than 3,000 parishes around the country. In the 2021 election, 12.3 percent of incumbent mayors, 38 to be precise, were barred from running for another term: 23 from the PS, 11 from the PSD, 3 from CDU and one from the CDS–PP.

The elections happened during the ongoing COVID-19 pandemic in Portugal. Because of that, there was a proposal by the Social Democratic Party to postpone the elections for two months and hold the election between 22 November and 14 December 2021. This proposal was rejected by Parliament and the election was to be held in the normal period set by the election law, between 22 September and 14 October. On 1 July 2021, the government announced the election date for 26 September 2021.

The Socialist Party (PS) retained their status as the largest party in local councils, but lost support across the country and especially in some big urban centers. The PS lost Coimbra, Funchal and Barcelos to the PSD, and suffered a massive upset in Lisbon, where the PS incumbent mayor Fernando Medina was defeated by the PSD/CDS coalition candidate Carlos Moedas. The PS losses across the country and the upset defeat in Lisbon were labeled as a "yellow card" to António Costa's government.

Despite not winning the most cities in the country as a whole, the Social Democrats (PSD) were considered the big winners of the elections by winning several urban centers from the Socialists, especially the upset victory in Lisbon, and narrowing the gap nationwide between them and the PS. The party also performed very well in the South, gaining ground in the Alentejo region by winning four cities in Évora district and winning Portalegre from an independent. In the Azores and Madeira regions, the party also made gains but lost some cities like Batalha and Guarda to independent movements. With these results, Rui Rio's position in the PSD leadership was strengthened.

The Unitary Democratic Coalition (CDU) continued its decline, winning just 19 mayors and 8 percent of the votes. The coalition was able to hold on to Évora and Setúbal, albeit by slim margins, but lost big suburban cities like Loures and Moita. In the Alentejo region the coalition lost cities to both PS and PSD, of note the losses of both Montemor-o-Novo and Mora, two Communist bastions since 1976, to the PS. Jerónimo de Sousa, CDU leader, recognized that the results "fell short of the goals" of the coalition.

Independent movements made further gains in these elections by winning Guarda from the PSD, and Elvas and Mealhada from the PS. In Porto, mayor Rui Moreira was reelected for a third term but lost his majority. In Figueira da Foz, former prime minister and PSD leader Pedro Santana Lopes made a dramatic comeback, running as an independent, by gaining the city from the PS. The Left Bloc suffered losses by electing only 5 councilors nationwide, a drop compared to the 12 councilors won in 2017, but managed to elect a councilor in the city of Porto for the first time.

Chega was able to win several councillors across the country, a total of 19, and polled 4 percent of the votes. André Ventura said that the results "weren't a total victory", as the party failed its goal of being the 3rd largest political force.

The Liberals (IL) did not win any councillors and polled just 1.3 percent of the votes. Together for the People (JPP) were able to hold on to Santa Cruz in the Madeira islands, while We, the Citizens! (NC) lost their sole city to the PSD.

Turnout in these elections decreased compared to four years ago, with just 53.6 percent of voters casting a ballot.

== Background ==
Official logo of the election.

=== Date ===
According to the local election law, an election must be called between 22 September and 14 October of the year that the local mandates end. The election is called by a Government of Portugal decree, unlike legislatuve elections which are called by the President of the Republic. The election date must be announced at least 80 days before election day. Election day is the same in all municipalities, and should fall on a Sunday or national holiday. The 2021 local elections should have, therefore, take place no later than 10 October 2021. In March 2021, Prime Minister António Costa said that the elections should be held in September, hinting that the most likely date for the election would be September 26, which was confirmed in July 2021.

=== Electoral system ===
Map of the 308 municipalities up for election.

All 308 municipalities are allocated a certain number of councilors to elect corresponding to the number of registered voters in a given municipality. Each party or coalition must present a list of candidates. The winner of the most voted list for the municipal council is automatically elected mayor, similar to first-past-the-post (FPTP). The lists are closed and the seats in each municipality are apportioned according to the D'Hondt method. Unlike in national legislative elections, independent lists are allowed to run.

Council seats and Parish assembly seats are distributed as follows:

Seat allocation for the 2021 local election
Councilors		Parish Assembly	
Seats	Voters	Seats	Voters
17	only Lisbon	19+^{a}	more than 30,000 voters
13	only Porto	19	more than 20,000 voters
11	100,000 voters or more	13	more than 5,000 voters
9	more than 50,000 voters	9	more than 1,000 voters
7	more than 10,000 voters	7	1,000 voters or less
5	10,000 voters or less		

^{a} For parishes with more than 30,000 voters, the number of seats mentioned above is increased by one per every 10,000 voters in excess of that number, and then by one more if the result is even.

=== By-elections (2017–2021) ===
During the normal four-year term of local governments, one municipal council by-election was held in the municipality of Castro Marim on 2 June 2019, after the local government, a PSD/CDS–PP minority, resigned, accusing the opposition of blocking the local administration's actions. The by-election results gave the PSD/CDS–PP coalition a majority of 3 councillors and nearly 60% of the votes, while the PS held on to their 2 councillors and 34% of the votes; CDU got just over 3% of the votes. Adding to this, thirteen parishes also held a by-election for parish assemblies.

City control in by-elections (2017–2021)
Date	Municipality	Population	Previous control	New control
2 June 2019	Castro Marim	6,747	PSD / CDS–PP	PSD / CDS–PP

== Parties ==
The political forces that expressed intention to present candidacies in at least one of the 308 municipalities are the following:

- Socialist Party (PS)
- Social Democratic Party (PSD) (only in some municipalities) (Note: The Social Democratic Party (PSD) and the People's Party (CDS–PP) will run in several coalitions across the country.In these coalitions, other parties may also be added like the People's Monarchist Party (PPM), the Earth Party (MPT) and the Alliance (A).)
- Unitary Democratic Coalition (CDU)
- Nonpartisan Politicians (IND)
- Left Bloc (BE)
- CDS – People's Party (CDS–PP) (only in some municipalities)
- People–Animals–Nature (PAN)
- LIVRE (L)
- Together for the People (JPP)
- We, the Citizens! (NC)
- Portuguese Workers' Communist Party (PCTP/MRPP)
- Portuguese Labour Party (PTP)
- Rise Up (E)
- Democratic Republican Party (PDR)
- Earth Party (MPT) (only in some municipalities)
- People's Monarchist Party (PPM) (only in some municipalities)
- Socialist Alternative Movement (MAS)
- Liberal Initiative (IL)
- Alliance (A) (only in some municipalities)
- Chega (CH)
- React, Include, Recycle (RIR)
- Volt Portugal (VP)

== Campaign period ==
=== Party slogans ===
Party or alliance	Original slogan	English translation	Refs
PS	« Garantir o Futuro. No Caminho Certo »	"Secure the Future. On the Right Track"	
PSD	« Nas Mãos de Todos »	"In Everyone's Hands"	
CDU	« Futuro de Confiança »	"Future of Trust"	
CDS–PP	« Acreditar em Portugal »	"Belief in Portugal"	
BE	« O voto que faz a diferença »	"The vote that makes the difference"	

== Voter turnout ==
The table below shows voter turnout throughout election day. Unlike past elections, voting was extended for one more hour, until 20:00, because of the COVID-19 pandemic.

Turnout	Time								
Turnout	12:00			16:00			20:00		
Turnout	2017	2021	±	2017	2021	±	2017	2021	±
Total	22.05%	20.94%	▼1.11 pp	44.39%	42.34%	▼2.05 pp	54.96%	53.65%	▼1.31 pp

== Results ==
=== Municipal Councils ===
==== National summary of votes and seats ====
Summary of the 26 September 2021 Municipal Councils elections results
Parties	Votes	%	±pp swing	Candidacies	Councillors		Mayors	
Parties	Votes	%	±pp swing	Candidacies	Total	±	Total	±
Socialist	1,711,725	34.22	▼3.6	293	888	▼64	148	▼11
Social Democratic	660,436	13.21	▼2.9	152	437	▼56	72	▼7
Social Democratic / People's	540,783	10.81	▲2.0	91	239	▲70	31	▲15
Unitary Democratic Coalition	410,666	8.21	▼1.3	301	148	▼23	19	▼5
Independents	276,961	5.54	▼1.3	79	134	▲4	19	▲2
Chega	208,232	4.16	—N/a	219	19	—N/a	0	—N/a
Left Bloc	137,560	2.75	▼0.5	113	4	▼8	0	0
PSD / CDS–PP / Alliance / MPT / PPM	90,912	1.81	—N/a	3	8	—N/a	1	—N/a
Socialist / LIVRE	80,869	1.62	—N/a	1	7	—N/a	0	—N/a
People's	74,869	1.50	▼1.1	82	31	▼10	6	0
PSD / CDS–PP / PPM	70,904	1.42	0.0	14	32	▲17	3	▲1
Liberal Initiative	64,849	1.30	—N/a	44	0	—N/a	0	—N/a
People–Animals–Nature	56,933	1.14	0.0	40	0	0	0	0
PSD / CDS–PP / Alliance / MPT / PDR / PPM / RIR	46,785	0.94	—N/a	2	7	—N/a	0	—N/a
PSD / CDS–PP / PPM / Alliance	44,851	0.90	—N/a	3	9	—N/a	1	—N/a
PSD / CDS–PP / NC / PPM / Alliance / RIR / Volt	29,349	0.59	—N/a	1	6	—N/a	1	—N/a
PSD / CDS–PP / MPT / PPM	28,722	0.57	▼1.1	8	16	▼7	2	▲1
PS / BE / PAN / MPT / PDR	22,694	0.45	0.0	1	5	▼1	0	▼1
LIVRE / Socialist	22,074	0.44	▲0.1	1	7	▲2	1	0
Socialist / People–Animals–Nature / LIVRE	17,265	0.35	—N/a	1	3	—N/a	0	—N/a
Social Democratic / Earth	16,371	0.33	▼0.1	3	5	0	1	▲1
PSD / CDS–PP / Alliance / MPT / PDR	15,230	0.30	—N/a	1	3	—N/a	0	—N/a
We, the Citizens!	15,226	0.30	▲0.1	20	5	0	0	▼1
Social Democratic / People's / Alliance	14,541	0.29	—N/a	4	4	—N/a	0	—N/a
Together for the People	14,073	0.28	0.0	5	5	▼1	1	0
PSD / CDS–PP / IL / MPT / PPM	14,030	0.28	—N/a	2	7	—N/a	1	—N/a
Socialist / React, Include, Recycle	13,506	0.27	—N/a	1	3	—N/a	0	—N/a
Social Democratic / People's Monarchist	9,735	0.19	▼0.8	2	5	▼3	0	0
Socialist / People–Animals–Nature	8,901	0.18	—N/a	1	3	—N/a	0	—N/a
People's / Social Democratic / Liberal Initiative	7,851	0.16	—N/a	1	3	—N/a	0	—N/a
PSD / CDS–PP / PPM / IL	5,726	0.11	—N/a	1	3	—N/a	0	—N/a
Left Bloc / LIVRE / Volt Portugal	5,539	0.11	—N/a	1	1	—N/a	0	—N/a
We, the Citizens! / People's Monarchist	4,410	0.09	—N/a	4	0	—N/a	0	—N/a
PSD / MPT / PPM	3,785	0.08	▲0.1	1	2	0	0	0
Alliance	3,765	0.08	—N/a	2	0	—N/a	0	—N/a
We, the Citizens! / React, Include, Recycle	3,354	0,07	—N/a	2	1	—N/a	0	—N/a
PSD / MPT / PPM / Alliance	3,338	0.07	—N/a	1	2	—N/a	0	—N/a
People's / Earth	3,192	0.06	▲0.1	2	0	0	0	0
Social Democratic / People's / Earth	3,150	0.06	▼0.1	1	4	▼3	1	▲1
Social Democratic / People's / Liberal Initiative	3,119	0.06	—N/a	1	3	—N/a	0	—N/a
PSD / CDS–PP / PPM / IL / Alliance	3,000	0.06	—N/a	1	1	—N/a	0	—N/a
People's / We, the Citizens! / Alliance	2,811	0.06	—N/a	1	1	—N/a	0	—N/a
LIVRE	2,611	0.05	▲0.0	8	0	0	0	0
We, the Citizens! / Alliance	2,203	0,04	—N/a	3	0	—N/a	0	—N/a
Volt Portugal	1,654	0.03	—N/a	3	0	—N/a	0	—N/a
Earth / People's Monarchist / Alliance	1,647	0.03	—N/a	1	0	—N/a	0	—N/a
PSD / CDS–PP / MPT / PPM / Alliance / PDR	1,625	0.03	—N/a	1	0	—N/a	0	—N/a
Earth	1,606	0.03	▼0.1	1	0	0	0	0
Labour	1,574	0.03	▼0.1	8	0	0	0	0
People's / Social Democratic	1,542	0.03	▼0.0	1	1	▼1	0	0
Portuguese Workers' Communist	1,341	0.03	▼0.2	2	0	0	0	0
CDS–PP / NC / MPT / Alliance / PPM	1,162	0.02	—N/a	1	0	—N/a	0	—N/a
People's Monarchist	988	0.02	▲0.0	7	0	0	0	0
CDS–PP / PDR / Alliance / MPT	908	0.02	—N/a	1	0	—N/a	0	—N/a
Socialist Alternative Movement	738	0.01	▼0.0	2	0	0	0	0
Earth / Democratic Republican	681	0.01	—N/a	2	0	—N/a	0	—N/a
CDS–PP / MPT / PPM / NC	627	0.01	—N/a	1	0	—N/a	0	—N/a
React, Include, Recycle	624	0.01	—N/a	7	0	—N/a	0	—N/a
People's / Earth / People's Monarchist	572	0.01	▼1.1	1	0	▼4	0	0
Rise Up	551	0.01	▼0.1	3	0	0	0	0
People's / Alliance / Democratic Republican	541	0.01	—N/a	1	0	—N/a	0	—N/a
Alliance / Democratic Republican	423	0.01	—N/a	1	0	—N/a	0	—N/a
People's Monarchist / React, Include, Recycle	377	0.01	—N/a	1	0	—N/a	0	—N/a
Democratic Republican	319	0.01	▼0.1	1	0	0	0	0
People's / People's Monarchist / Alliance	273	0.01	—N/a	1	0	—N/a	0	—N/a
React, Include, Recycle / Democratic Republican	237	0.00	—N/a	1	0	—N/a	0	—N/a
Democratic Republican / Earth / Alliance	234	0.00	—N/a	2	0	—N/a	0	—N/a
CDS–PP / PSD / PPM	201	0.00	0.0	2	2	▲2	0	0
Democratic Republican / Earth	144	0.00	—N/a	1	0	—N/a	0	—N/a
Earth / Alliance / React, Include, Recycle	138	0.00	—N/a	1	0	—N/a	0	—N/a
**Total valid**	**4,797,633**	**95.91**	**▲0.5**	**1,572**	**2,064**	**▼10**	**308**	**0**
Blank ballots	125,173	2.50	▼0.1					
Invalid ballots	79,241	1.58	▼0.3					
**Total**	**5,002,047**	**100.00**						
Registered voters/turnout	9,323,688	53.65	▼1.3					
Source: Official election 2021 results

==== Municipality map ====
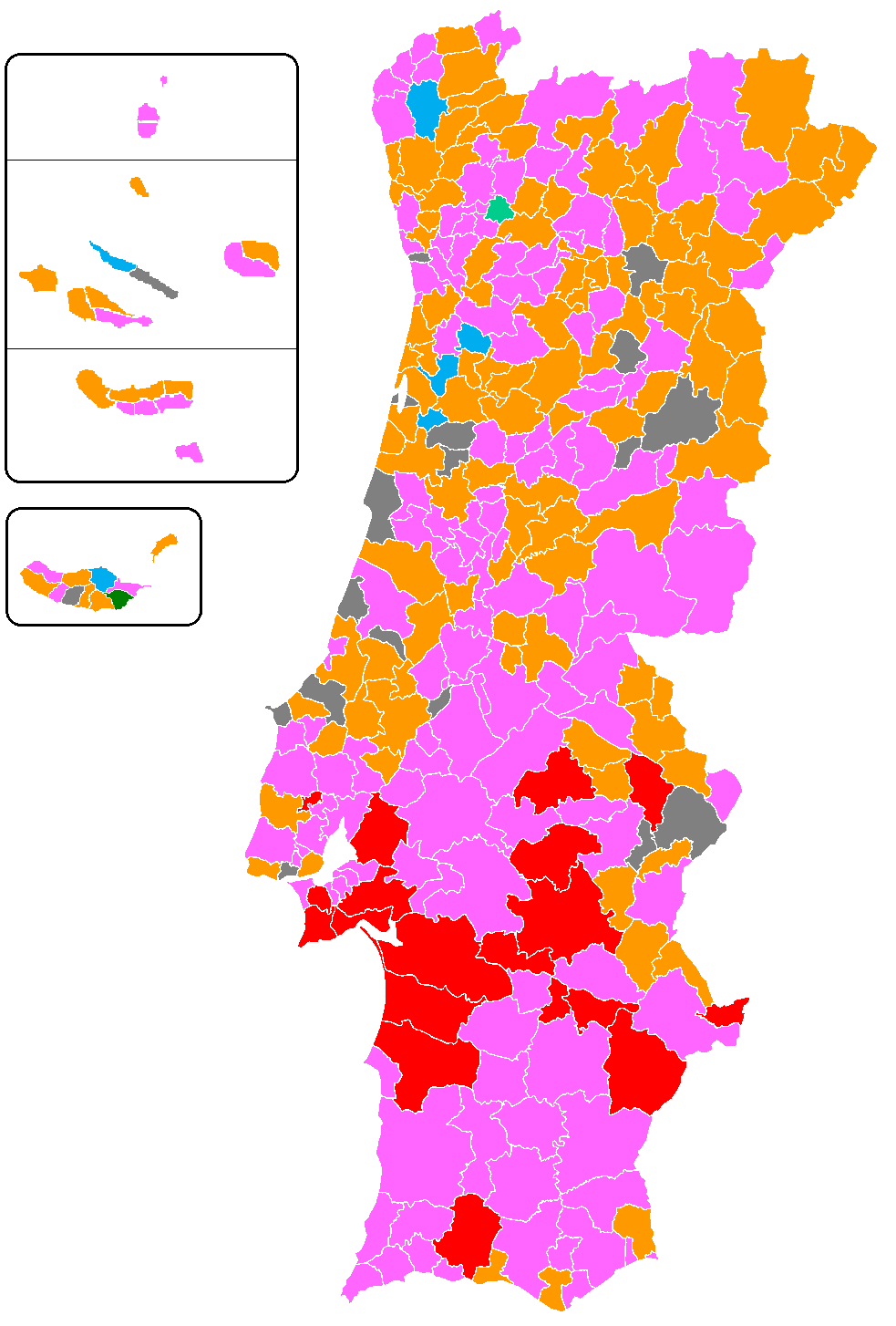
Most voted parties/coalitions in each Municipality. Municipalities won by: ■ - PS: 148 ■ - PSD: 114 ■ - CDU: 19 ■ - CDS–PP: 6 ■ - JPP: 1 ■ - LIVRE: 1 ■ - Independents: 19

==== City control ====
The following table lists party control in all district capitals, highlighted in bold, as well as in municipalities above 100,000 inhabitants. Population estimates from 2021 Census.

Municipality	Population	Previous control	New control
Almada	177,400	Socialist Party (PS)	Socialist Party (PS)
Amadora	171,719	Socialist Party (PS)	Socialist Party (PS)
**Aveiro**	80,880	PSD / CDS–PP / PPM	PSD / CDS–PP / PPM
Barcelos	116,777	Socialist Party (PS)	PSD / CDS–PP
**Beja**	33,401	Socialist Party (PS)	Socialist Party (PS)
**Braga**	193,333	PSD / CDS–PP / PPM	PSD / CDS–PP / PPM / Alliance
**Bragança**	34,580	Social Democratic Party (PSD)	Social Democratic Party (PSD)
Cascais	214,134	PSD / CDS–PP	PSD / CDS–PP
**Castelo Branco**	52,272	Socialist Party (PS)	Socialist Party (PS)
**Coimbra**	140,796	Socialist Party (PS)	PSD / CDS–PP / NC / PPM / Alliance / RIR / Volt
**Évora**	53,568	Unitary Democratic Coalition (CDU)	Unitary Democratic Coalition (CDU)
**Faro**	67,566	PSD / CDS–PP / PPM / MPT	PSD / CDS–PP / IL / PPM / MPT
**Funchal**	105,919	PS / BE / NC / PDR	PSD / CDS–PP
Gondomar	164,255	Socialist Party (PS)	Socialist Party (PS)
**Guarda**	40,155	Social Democratic Party (PSD)	Independent (IND)
Guimarães	156,852	Socialist Party (PS)	Socialist Party (PS)
**Leiria**	128,640	Socialist Party (PS)	Socialist Party (PS)
**Lisbon** (details)	544,851	Socialist Party (PS)	PSD / CDS–PP / Alliance / MPT / PPM
Loures	201,646	Unitary Democratic Coalition (CDU)	Socialist Party (PS)
Maia	134,959	PSD / CDS–PP	PSD / CDS–PP
Matosinhos	172,669	Socialist Party (PS)	Socialist Party (PS)
Odivelas	148,156	Socialist Party (PS)	Socialist Party (PS)
Oeiras	171,802	Independent (IND)	Independent (IND)
**Ponta Delgada**	67,287	Social Democratic Party (PSD)	Social Democratic Party (PSD)
**Portalegre**	22,368	Independent (IND)	PSD / CDS–PP
**Porto** (details)	231,962	Independent (IND)	Independent (IND)
**Santarém**	58,770	Social Democratic Party (PSD)	Social Democratic Party (PSD)
Santa Maria da Feira	136,720	Social Democratic Party (PSD)	Social Democratic Party (PSD)
Seixal	166,693	Unitary Democratic Coalition (CDU)	Unitary Democratic Coalition (CDU)
**Setúbal**	123,684	Unitary Democratic Coalition (CDU)	Unitary Democratic Coalition (CDU)
Sintra	385,954	Socialist Party (PS)	Socialist Party (PS)
**Viana do Castelo**	85,864	Socialist Party (PS)	Socialist Party (PS)
Vila Franca de Xira	137,659	Socialist Party (PS)	Socialist Party (PS)
Vila Nova de Famalicão	133,590	PSD / CDS–PP	PSD / CDS–PP
Vila Nova de Gaia	304,149	Socialist Party (PS)	Socialist Party (PS)
**Vila Real**	49,623	Socialist Party (PS)	Socialist Party (PS)
**Viseu**	99,693	Social Democratic Party (PSD)	Social Democratic Party (PSD)

=== Municipal Assemblies ===
==== National summary of votes and seats ====
Summary of the 26 September 2021 Municipal Assemblies elections results
Parties	Votes	%	±pp swing	Candidacies	Mandates	
Parties	Votes	%	±pp swing	Candidacies	Total	±
Socialist	1,645,211	32.89	▼3.5	292	2,590	▼141
Social Democratic	635,635	12.71	▼3.1	152	1,273	▼218
Social Democratic / People's	537,002	10.74	▲1.9	92	751	▲212
Unitary Democratic Coalition	434,172	8.68	▼1.4	303	505	▼114
Independents	267,300	5.35	▼1.1	76	412	▲16
Chega	221,645	4.43	—N/a	167	173	—N/a
Left Bloc	174,072	3.48	▼0.7	123	94	▼31
PSD / CDS–PP / Alliance / MPT / PPM	84,707	1.69	—N/a	3	22	—N/a
People's	77,069	1.54	▼1.2	72	118	▼66
Liberal Initiative	76,349	1.53	—N/a	43	26	—N/a
Socialist / LIVRE	74,768	1.50	—N/a	1	17	—N/a
PSD / CDS–PP / PPM	74,234	1.48	▲0.1	14	96	▲54
People–Animals–Nature	74,229	1.48	▲0.1	41	23	▼3
PSD / CDS–PP / Alliance / MPT / PDR / PPM / RIR	43,862	0.88	—N/a	2	16	—N/a
PSD / CDS–PP / PPM / Alliance	41,358	0.83	—N/a	3	25	—N/a
PSD / CDS–PP / MPT / PPM	28,203	0.58	▼1.1	8	44	▼29
PSD / CDS–PP / NC / PPM / Alliance / RIR / Volt	26,916	0.54	—N/a	1	15	—N/a
PS / BE / PAN / MPT / PDR	21,624	0.43	0.0	1	14	▼1
LIVRE / Socialist	20,730	0.41	▲0.1	1	20	▲6
Socialist / People–Animals–Nature / LIVRE	18,465	0.37	—N/a	1	8	—N/a
Social Democratic / Earth	16,343	0.33	▼0.1	3	14	▲7
PSD / CDS–PP / Alliance / MPT / PDR	15,052	0.30	—N/a	1	9	—N/a
Social Democratic / People's / Alliance	14,965	0.30	—N/a	4	16	—N/a
Socialist / React, Include, Recycle	13,955	0.28	—N/a	1	10	—N/a
Together for the People	13,903	0.28	0.0	5	13	▼4
We, the Citizens!	13,865	0.28	▲0.1	17	20	▲5
PSD / CDS–PP / IL / MPT / PPM	12,867	0.26	—N/a	2	17	—N/a
Social Democratic / People's Monarchist	10,254	0.21	▼0.7	2	16	▼10
Socialist / People–Animals–Nature	9,183	0.18	—N/a	1	8	—N/a
People's / Social Democratic / Liberal Initiative	8,434	0.17	—N/a	1	8	—N/a
PSD / CDS–PP / PPM / IL	6,293	0.13	—N/a	1	10	—N/a
Left Bloc / LIVRE / Volt	5,769	0.12	—N/a	1	3	—N/a
We, the Citizens! / People's Monarchist	4,674	0.09	—N/a	1	2	—N/a
Alliance	3,810	0.08	—N/a	3	2	—N/a
PSD / MPT / PPM	3,615	0.07	▲0.1	1	5	0
PSD / MPT / PPM / Alliance	3,453	0.07	—N/a	1	5	—N/a
Social Democratic / People's / Liberal Initiative	3,335	0.07	—N/a	1	8	—N/a
People's / Earth	3,301	0.07	▲0.1	2	1	▼1
Social Democratic / People's / Earth	3,244	0.06	▼0.2	1	11	▼13
We, the Citizens! / React, Include, Recycle	3,038	0,06	—N/a	1	3	—N/a
PSD / CDS–PP / PPM / IL / Alliance	2,856	0.06	—N/a	1	4	—N/a
People's / We, the Citizens! / Alliance	2,667	0.05	—N/a	1	3	—N/a
LIVRE	2,564	0.05	▲0.0	7	0	0
We, the Citizens! / Alliance	2,482	0,05	—N/a	3	3	—N/a
Labour	1,809	0.04	▼0.1	8	0	▼1
People's / Social Democratic	1,666	0.03	▼0.0	1	4	▼2
PSD / CDS–PP / MPT / PPM / Alliance / PDR	1,659	0.03	—N/a	1	2	—N/a
Earth	1,650	0.03	▼0.1	1	1	▼1
Volt Portugal	1,644	0.03	—N/a	2	0	—N/a
Earth / People's Monarchist / Alliance	1,587	0.03	—N/a	1	1	—N/a
CDS–PP / NC / MPT / Alliance / PPM	1,488	0.03	—N/a	1	1	—N/a
Earth / Democratic Republican	996	0.02	—N/a	2	0	—N/a
CDS–PP / PDR / Alliance / MPT	962	0.02	—N/a	1	0	—N/a
Portuguese Workers' Communist	918	0.02	▼0.2	1	0	0
Socialist Alternative Movement	889	0.02	—N/a	2	0	—N/a
People's / Earth / People's Monarchist	861	0.02	—N/a	1	1	—N/a
Rise Up	755	0.01	▼0.1	3	0	0
People's Monarchist	749	0.01	0.0	4	0	0
React, Include, Recycle	748	0.01	—N/a	7	0	—N/a
CDS–PP / MPT / PPM / NC	737	0.01	—N/a	1	0	—N/a
People's / Alliance / Democratic Republican	566	0.01	—N/a	1	0	—N/a
People's / People's Monarchist / Alliance	460	0.01	—N/a	1	0	—N/a
Alliance / Democratic Republican	450	0.01	—N/a	1	0	—N/a
People's Monarchist / React, Include, Recycle	409	0.01	—N/a	1	0	—N/a
React, Include, Recycle / Democratic Republican	259	0.01	—N/a	1	0	—N/a
Democratic Republican / Earth / Alliance	252	0.01	—N/a	2	0	—N/a
CDS–PP / PSD / PPM	209	0.00	0.0	2	5	▲5
Democratic Republican / Earth	164	0.00	—N/a	1	0	—N/a
Earth / Alliance / React, Include, Recycle	131	0.00	—N/a	1	0	—N/a
**Total valid**	**4,779,491**	**95.56**	**▲0.5**	**1,506**	**6,448**	**▼13**
Blank ballots	139,191	2.78	▼0.1			
Invalid ballots	83,028	1.66	▼0.3			
**Total**	**5,001,710**	**100.00**				
Registered voters/turnout	9,323,688	53.65	▼1.3			
Source: Official election 2021 results RTP Election 2021 results

=== Parish Assemblies ===
==== National summary of votes and seats ====
Summary of the 26 September 2021 Parish Assemblies elections results
Parties	Votes	%	±pp swing	Candidacies	Mandates		Presidents	
Parties	Votes	%	±pp swing	Candidacies	Total	±	Total	±
Socialist	1,664,556	33.30	▼3.0	2,448	10,316	▼307	1,248	▼47
Social Democratic	640,576	12.81	▼2.9	1,323	5,688	▼946	757	▼68
Social Democratic / People's	521,743	10.44	▲1.9	854	3,210	▲724	336	▲65
Unitary Democratic Coalition	454,099	9.08	▼1.1	1,630	1,446	▼217	112	▼27
Independents	408,434	8.17	▼1.6	783	3,232	▼123	414	▲12
Chega	155,861	3.12	—N/a	505	205	—N/a	0	—N/a
Left Bloc	138,323	2.77	▼0.5	372	162	▼51	0	0
PSD / CDS–PP / Alliance / MPT / PPM	83,221	1.67	—N/a	31	135	—N/a	10	—N/a
Socialist / LIVRE	80,807	1.62	—N/a	24	146	—N/a	13	—N/a
PSD / CDS–PP / PPM	80,028	1.60	▲0.4	117	412	▲162	34	▲6
People's	68,133	1.36	▼1.1	266	416	▼218	41	▼13
Liberal Initiative	49,832	1.00	—N/a	114	45	—N/a	0	—N/a
PSD / CDS–PP / Alliance / MPT / PDR / PPM / RIR	45,473	0.91	—N/a	15	75	—N/a	3	—N/a
PSD / CDS–PP / PPM / Alliance	36,814	0.74	—N/a	48	195	—N/a	21	—N/a
PSD / CDS–PP / MPT / PPM	28,167	0.56	▼0.8	48	114	▼124	10	▼1
PSD / CDS–PP / NC / PPM / Alliance / RIR / Volt	26,254	0.53	—N/a	18	70	—N/a	6	—N/a
People–Animals–Nature	25,754	0.52	▲0.3	60	16	▲10	0	0
PS / BE / PAN / MPT / PDR	21,622	0.43	▲0.0	10	59	▲1	1	▼4
LIVRE / Socialist	20,043	0.40	▲0.2	19	122	▲68	17	▲10
Socialist / People–Animals–Nature / LIVRE	19,952	0.40	—N/a	4	23	—N/a	0	—N/a
Social Democratic / Earth	18,042	0.36	▲0.1	17	66	▲14	8	▲7
Social Democratic / People's / Alliance	15,503	0.30	—N/a	26	70	—N/a	0	—N/a
PSD / CDS–PP / Alliance / MPT / PDR	14,928	0.30	—N/a	6	27	—N/a	0	—N/a
Socialist / React, Include, Recycle	14,324	0.29	—N/a	25	79	—N/a	3	—N/a
Together for the People	14,007	0.28	▲0.0	17	43	▼2	5	0
PSD / CDS–PP / IL / MPT / PPM	12,882	0.28	—N/a	10	36	—N/a	2	—N/a
Social Democratic / People's Monarchist	11,021	0.22	▼0.8	18	60	▼104	3	▼11
Socialist / People–Animals–Nature	8,873	0.18	—N/a	9	33	—N/a	1	—N/a
We, the Citizens!	8,070	0.16	▼0.0	56	47	▲5	3	0
PSD / CDS–PP / PPM / IL	6,599	0.13	—N/a	16	66	—N/a	9	—N/a
Left Bloc / LIVRE / Volt	5,601	0.11	—N/a	5	5	—N/a	0	—N/a
People's / Social Democratic / Liberal Initiative	5,031	0.10	—N/a	11	24	—N/a	1	—N/a
Social Democratic / People's / Earth	4,050	0.08	▼0.1	8	29	▼28	3	▼2
PSD / MPT / PPM / Alliance	4,008	0.08	—N/a	4	15	—N/a	1	—N/a
We, the Citizens! / React, Include, Recycle	3,807	0.08	—N/a	6	10	—N/a	0	—N/a
We, the Citizens! / People's Monarchist	3,559	0.07	—N/a	11	3	—N/a	0	—N/a
Social Democratic / People's / Liberal Initiative	3,522	0.07	—N/a	1	6	—N/a	0	—N/a
PSD / MPT / PPM	3,520	0.07	▲0.1	3	8	▼4	0	0
People's / Earth	3,395	0.07	▲0.1	21	1	▼1	0	0
People's / We, the Citizens! / Alliance	2,862	0.06	—N/a	3	4	—N/a	0	—N/a
We, the Citizens! / Alliance	2,698	0.05	—N/a	11	8	—N/a	0	—N/a
Alliance	2,544	0.05	—N/a	8	6	—N/a	0	—N/a
PSD / CDS–PP / PPM / IL / Alliance	2,514	0.05	—N/a	2	6	—N/a	0	—N/a
Labour	1,969	0.04	▼0.1	32	0	0	0	0
People's / Social Democratic	1,783	0.04	▼0.0	6	15	▼10	2	0
PSD / CDS–PP / MPT / PPM / Alliance / PDR	1,743	0.03	—N/a	4	3	—N/a	0	—N/a
Earth	1,671	0.03	▼0.1	6	7	0	0	0
CDS–PP / NC / MPT / Alliance / PPM	1,558	0.03	—N/a	6	4	—N/a	0	—N/a
CDS–PP / PDR / Alliance / MPT	1,139	0.02	—N/a	4	0	—N/a	0	—N/a
React, Include, Recycle	761	0.02	—N/a	5	1	—N/a	0	—N/a
People's / Earth / People's Monarchist	652	0.01	▼0.8	5	1	▼76	0	0
People's / Alliance / Democratic Republican	575	0.01	—N/a	3	0	—N/a	0	—N/a
Earth / Democratic Republican	556	0.01	—N/a	3	5	—N/a	1	—N/a
People's Monarchist	503	0.01	0.0	9	5	▲4	1	▲1
LIVRE	482	0.01	0.0	3	0	▼2	0	0
Volt Portugal	378	0.01	—N/a	4	0	—N/a	0	—N/a
People's Monarchist / React, Include, Recycle	328	0.01	—N/a	3	0	—N/a	0	—N/a
Portuguese Workers' Communist	318	0.01	▼0.1	2	0	0	0	0
Earth / People's Monarchist / Alliance	293	0.01	—N/a	3	3	—N/a	0	—N/a
Alliance / Democratic Republican	288	0.01	—N/a	2	0	—N/a	0	—N/a
CDS–PP / MPT / PPM / NC	246	0.00	—N/a	1	3	—N/a	0	—N/a
Democratic Republican / Earth / Alliance	223	0.00	—N/a	2	0	—N/a	0	—N/a
React, Include, Recycle / Democratic Republican	214	0.00	—N/a	4	0	—N/a	0	—N/a
Rise Up	186	0.00	▼0.0	6	0	0	0	0
CDS–PP / PSD / PPM	115	0.00	—N/a	2	0	—N/a	0	—N/a
Earth / Alliance / React, Include, Recycle	102	0.00	—N/a	5	0	—N/a	0	—N/a
Democratic Republican	48	0.00	▼0.0	1	0	▼4	0	0
**Total valid**	**4,757,183**	**95.16**	**▲0.3**	**9,104**	**26,790**	**▼229**	**3,066**	**▼19**
Blank ballots	145,769	2.92	▼0.0					
Invalid ballots	96,412	1.93	▼0.3					
**Total**	**4,999,364**	**100.00**						
Registered voters/turnout	9,319,425	53.64	▼1.3					
Source: Official election 2021 results RTP Election 2021 results

== See also ==
- 2021 Lisbon local election
- 2021 Porto local election
- Politics of Portugal
- List of political parties in Portugal
- Elections in Portugal
