= José Inácio Faria =

Portuguese politician

José Inácio Faria MEP
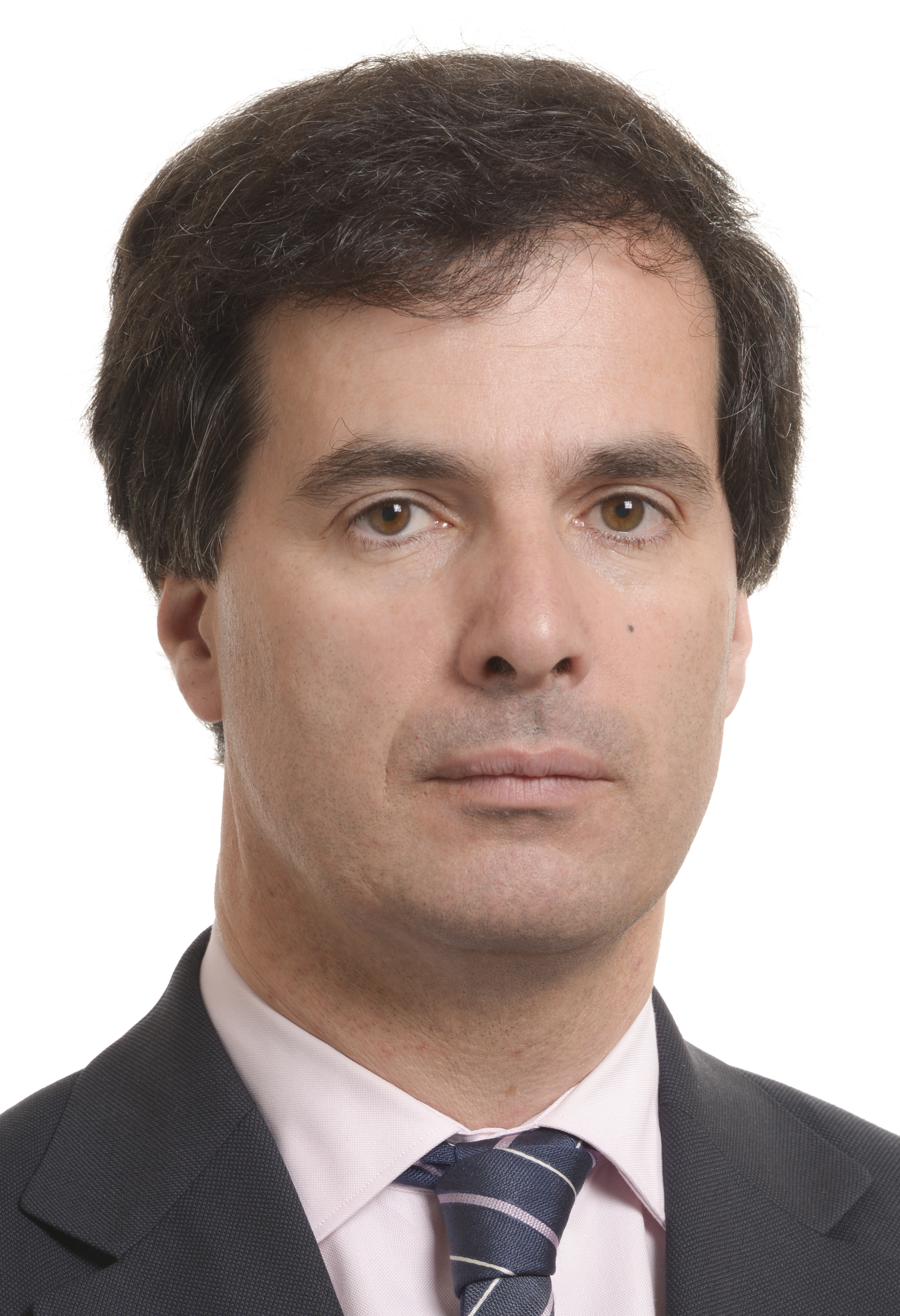
- Official portrait as an MEP, 2014

Member of the European Parliament for Portugal
- In office 1 July 2014 – 2 July 2019

President of the Earth Party
- In office 22 November 2014 – 22 June 2019
- Preceded by: John Rosas Baker
- Succeeded by: Manuel Ramos

Personal details
- Born: José Inácio da Silva Ramos Antunes de Faria; 13 March 1962 (age 64) Viana do Castelo, Portugal
- Party: Earth Party
- Education: University of Lisbon
- Website: EU Personal Profile

José Inácio da Silva Ramos Antunes de Faria (born 13 March 1962) is a Portuguese politician who served as a Member of the European Parliament for the Earth Party.

== Biography ==
Faria was born in 1962, in Viana do Castelo.

In the 2014 European Parliament election, he was the second candidate on the Earth Party's list, after António Marinho e Pinto. He was surprisingly elected alongside Marinho e Pinto, becoming an MEP. After Marinho e Pinto left the MPT to create the Democratic Republican Party, he became the sole MEP from the party. In 2019, after the MPT decided not to run for that years' European Parliament elections, Faria joined the We, the Citizens!' list as the second candidate, failing to be reelected.
