= Pedro Soares Pimenta =

Portuguese politician

- Pimenta speaking in the 13th Congress of MPT, in 2024

President of the Earth Party
- Incumbent
- Assumed office 20 December 2020
- Preceded by: Manuel Ramos

Member of the Assembly of the Republic
- Incumbent
- Assumed office 1 January 2026
- Constituency: Lisbon

Personal details
- Born: Pedro Ricardo Soares Pimenta; 16 June 1976 (age 50) Leiria, Portugal
- Party: Earth Party
- Occupation: Politician

Pedro Ricardo Soares Pimenta (born 16 June 1976) is a Portuguese politician, entrepeneur and psychologist who has been the President of the Earth Party since December 2020.

Since 2026, he has been a member of the Assembly of the Republic, as a temporary replacement for a Social Democratic Party MP, being a part of the PSD parliamentary group. This was part of an agreement in which the MPT joined the AD – Coalition PSD/CDS.
