= Democratic Republican Party (Portugal) =

Centrist political party in Portugal

Democratic Republican Party Partido Democrático Republicano
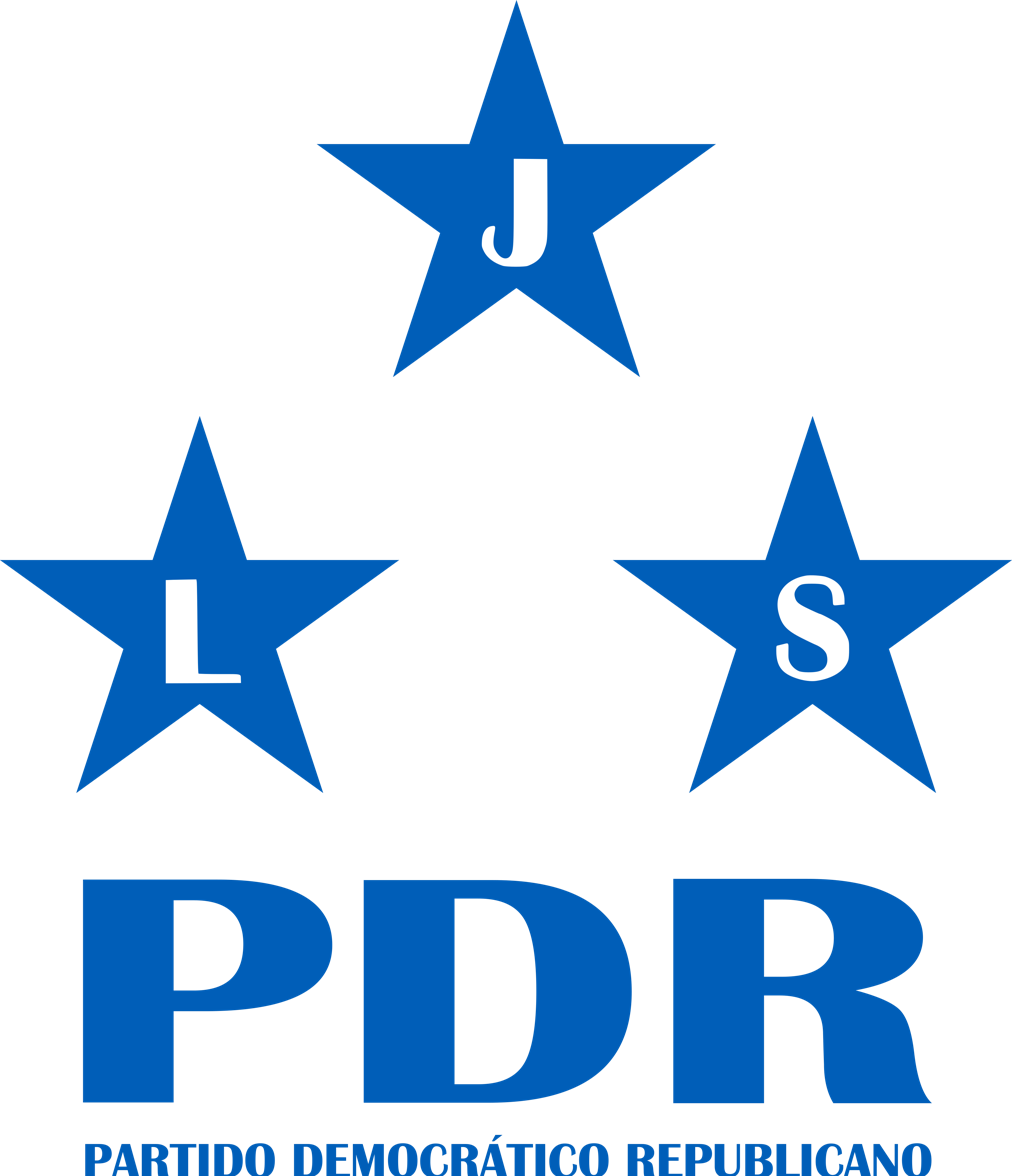
- Abbreviation: PDR
- President: António Marinho e Pinto
- Secretary-General: José Vieira da Cunha
- Founded: October 5, 2014
- Legalised: February 11, 2015
- Dissolved: September 28, 2021
- Split from: Earth Party
- Succeeded by: National Democratic Alternative
- Headquarters: Estrada da Luz, 71; 1600–165 Lisboa
- Ideology: Populism; Liberalism
- Political position: Centre
- European affiliation: European Democratic Party
- European Parliament group: Alliance of Liberals and Democrats for Europe
- Colours: blue

Website
- www.pdr.pt

The Democratic Republican Party (Portuguese: Partido Democrático Republicano, PDR) was a liberal Portuguese political party, founded in 2014. It was founded in Coimbra on 5 October 2014 and was legalised by the Portuguese Constitutional Court on 11 February 2015. It was created by António Marinho e Pinto, an MEP formerly for the Earth Party. It was a member of the European Democratic Party, and sat within the Alliance of Liberals and Democrats for Europe Group in the European Parliament.

In the 2015 legislative elections it did not succeed in electing a member of parliament, receiving 60,912 votes or 1.1% and coming 7th.

== Electoral results ==
=== Assembly of the Republic ===
Election	Leader	Votes	%	Seats	+/-	Government
2015	António Marinho e Pinto	60,912	1.1 (#7)	0 / 230	New	No seats
2019	António Marinho e Pinto	11,674	0.2 (#16)	0 / 230	0	No seats

=== European Parliament ===
Election	Leader	Votes	%	Seats	+/-
2019	António Marinho e Pinto	15,789	0.5 (#14)	0 / 21	New
