= 2014 European Parliament election in Portugal =

- 25 May 2014

All 21 Portuguese seats to the European Parliament
- Turnout: 33.7% ▼3.1 pp
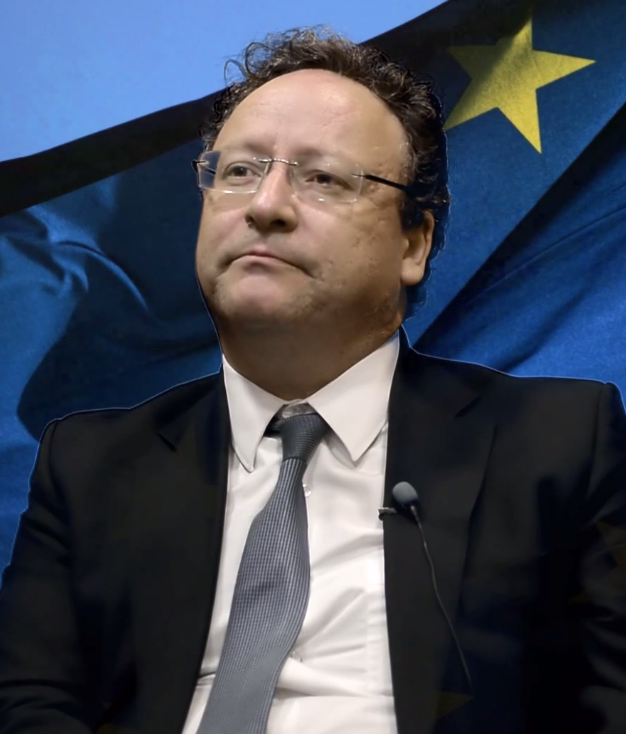

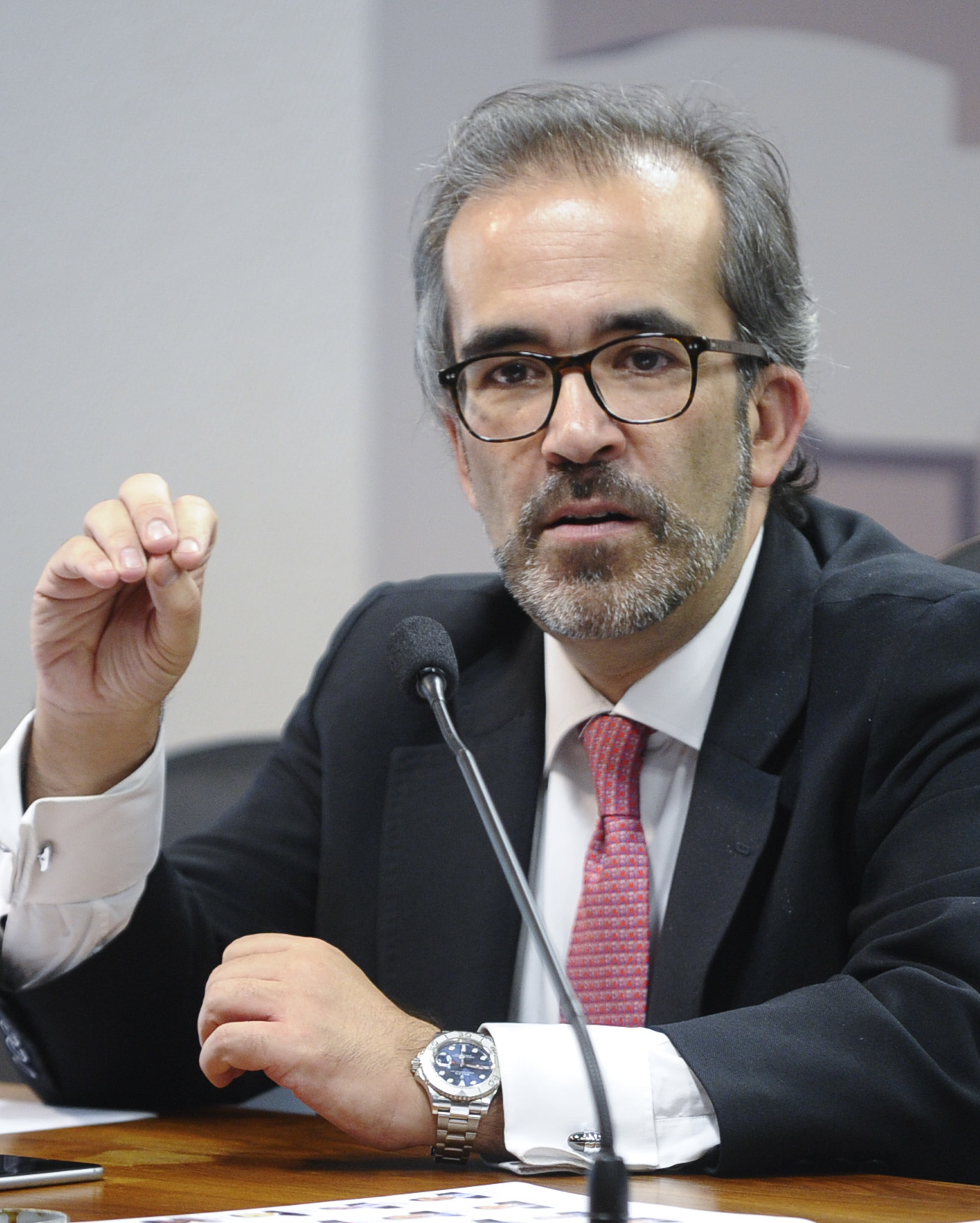

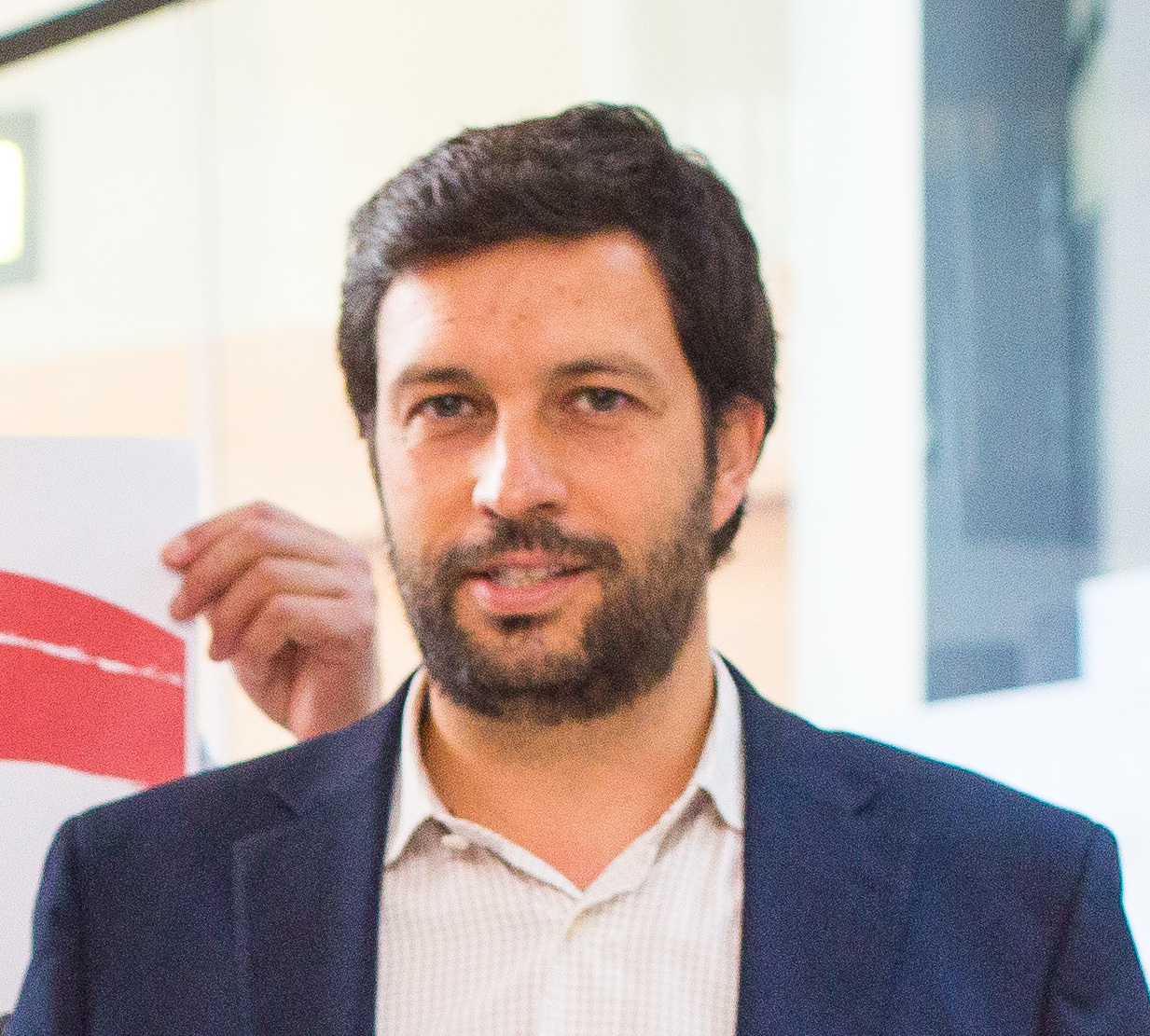

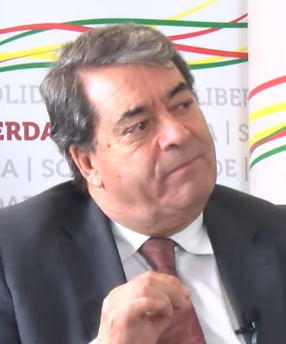

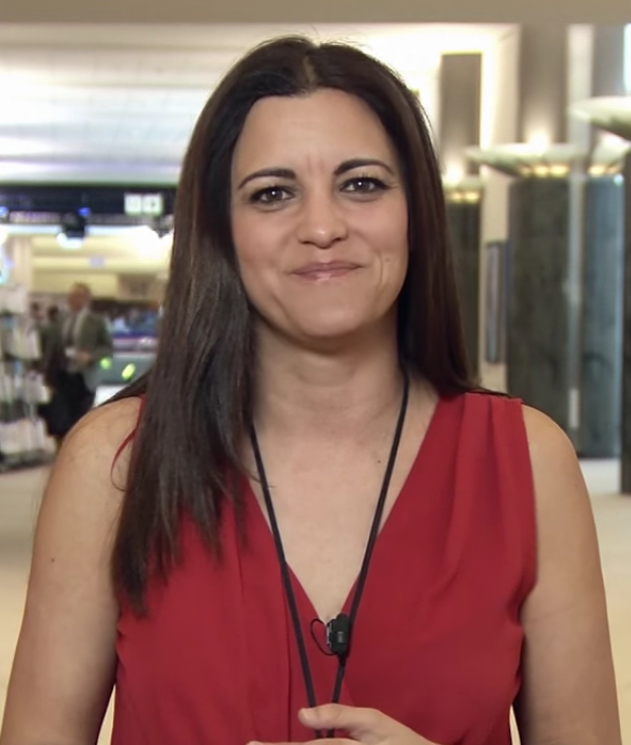

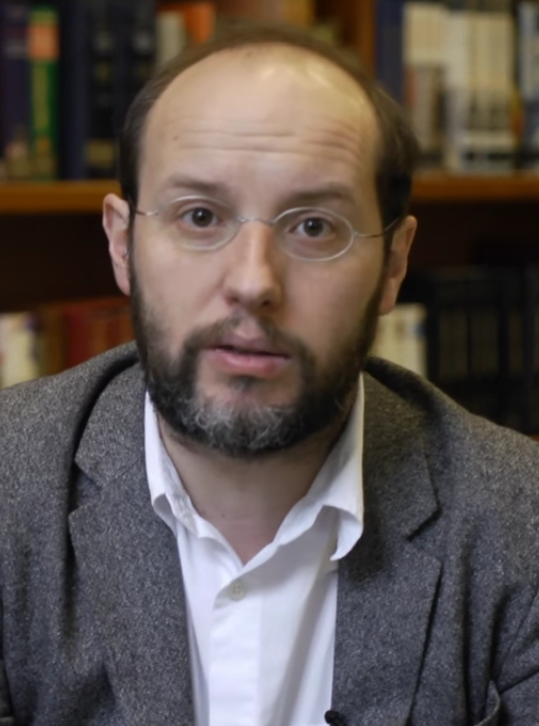
	First party	Second party	Third party
Leader	Francisco Assis	Paulo Rangel	João Ferreira
Party	PS	AP	CDU
Alliance	S&D	EPP	GUE/NGL
Last election	7 seats, 26.6%	10 seats, 40.1%	2 seats, 10.6%
Seats won	8	7	3
Seat change	▲1	▼3	▲1
Popular vote	1,034,249	910,647	416,925
Percentage	31.5%	27.7%	12.7%
Swing	▲4.9 pp	▼12.4 pp	▲2.0 pp
	Fourth party	Fifth party	Sixth party
Leader	Marinho e Pinto	Marisa Matias	Rui Tavares
Party	MPT	BE	L
Alliance	ALDE	GUE/NGL	Greens/EFA
Last election	0 seats, 0.7%	3 seats, 10.7%	Did not contest
Seats won	2	1	0
Seat change	▲2	▼2	New party
Popular vote	234,788	149,764	71,495
Percentage	7.2%	4.6%	2.2%
Swing	▲6.5 pp	▼6.2 pp	New party

An election was held in Portugal on Sunday, 25 May 2014, to elect the Portuguese delegation to the European Parliament from 2014 to 2019. This was the seventh European Parliament election held in Portugal.

The Socialist Party (PS) was the winner of the election, scoring 31.5 percent of the votes. The Socialists increased their share of vote by almost 5 percentage points, and won one more seat compared with 2009. However, the PS victory was much weaker than what polls predicted, as the margin between them and the Social Democratic Party (PSD) and CDS – People's Party (CDS) coalition was below 4 points. Because of this worse than expected result, the PS would enter in a leadership contest just weeks after the election.

The PSD/CDS contested the election in a coalition called "Portugal Alliance". The coalition achieved one of the worst results ever for the center-right, as PSD+CDS never polled below 30 percent, but the weak result by the coalition was softened by the close margin between them and the Socialists.

The Democratic Unity Coalition (CDU) scored their best result since 1989, polling almost 13 percent of the vote and winning one more seat compared with 2009. On the other hand, the Left Bloc (BE) suffered a huge defeat by erasing their 2009 historic results. The BE won 4.6 percent of the votes, a drop of more than 6 points, and was only able to elect their top candidate Marisa Matias, compared with the three seats they won in 2009.

The big surprise of the elections was the extraordinary result of the Earth Party (MPT). Headed by the former bar association chairman António Marinho e Pinto, MPT won 7.2 percent of the votes and was able to elect two members to the European Parliament. To add also, that LIVRE, headed by BE dissident Rui Tavares, was not able to win a seat, although scoring 2.2 percent.

Turnout fell to the lowest level ever, with only 33.7 percent of voters casting a ballot.

== Electoral system ==
The voting method used, for the election of European members of parliament, is by proportional representation using the d'Hondt method, which is known to benefit leading parties. In the 2014 European Union elections, Portugal had 21 seats to be filled. Deputies are elected in a single constituency, corresponding to the entire national territory.

== Parties and candidates ==
The major parties that participated in the election, and their European Parliament list leaders, were:

- Left Bloc (BE), Marisa Matias
- Democratic Unity Coalition (CDU), João Ferreira
- Socialist Party (PS), Francisco Assis
- Social Democratic Party (PSD)/People's Party (CDS–PP) Portugal Alliance (AP), Paulo Rangel
- LIVRE (L), Rui Tavares
- Socialist Alternative Movement (MAS), Gil Garcia
- Earth Party (MPT), António Marinho e Pinto
- Party for Animals and Nature (PAN), Orlando Figueiredo
- Portuguese Workers' Communist Party (PCTP/MRPP), Leopoldo Mesquita
- Democratic Party of the Atlantic (PDA), Paulo Casaca
- New Democracy Party (PND), Eduardo Welsh
- National Renovator Party (PNR), Humberto Nuno de Oliveira
- Workers Party of Socialist Unity (POUS), Carmelinda Pereira
- People's Monarchist Party (PPM), Nuno Correia da Silva
- Portugal Pro-Life (PPV), Acácio Valente
- Portuguese Labour Party (PTP), José Manuel Coelho

The Social Democratic Party and the People's Party have contested this election in a coalition.

== Campaign period ==
=== Party slogans ===
Party or alliance	Original slogan	English translation	Refs
AP	« Na Europa por Portugal »	"In Europe for Portugal"	
PS	« Confiança na Mudança »	"Trust in Change"	
BE	« De Pé! »	"Standing!"	
CDU	« Defender o povo e o País »	"Defending the people and the country"	
MPT	« Mais verdade na política! »	"More truth in politics!"	
LIVRE	« Livre. Para fazer diferente. »	"Free. To do different. »	

=== Candidates' debates ===
2014 European Parliament election in Portugal debates
Date	Organisers	Moderator(s)	P Present A Absent invitee N Non-invitee						
Date	Organisers	Moderator(s)	AP Rangel	PS Assis	BE Matias	CDU Ferreira	MPT Pinto	LIVRE Tavares	Refs
22 May	Antena 1	Maria Flor Pedroso	P	P	P	P	P	P	

== Opinion polling ==
Exit poll

Polling firm/Link	Fieldwork date	Sample size	AP		PS	BE	CDU	MPT	LIVRE	O	Lead
Polling firm/Link	Fieldwork date	Sample size	PSD	CDS–PP	PS	BE	CDU	MPT	LIVRE	O	Lead
2014 EP election	25 May 2014	—N/a	27.7; 7		31.5; 8	4.6; 1	12.7; 3	7.2; 2	2.2; 0	14.1; 0	3.8
CESOP–UCP	25 May 2014 (20:00)	—N/a	25–29; 6/8		30–34; 7/9	5–7; 1/2	12–15; 3/4	7–8; 1/2	—	—	5
Eurosondagem	25 May 2014 (20:00)	—N/a	25.0–29.2; 7/8		32.1–36.3; 8/9	4.2–6.0; 1	11.4–13.9; 3	6.6–8.8; 1/2	—	—	7.1
Aximage	25 May 2014 (20:00)	—N/a	26–30; 7/8		32–37; 8/10	4–7; 1	10–14; 3	5–9; 1	—	—	6–7
Aximage	14–22 May 2014	1,507	30.1; 7/9		36.4; 9/10	5.8; 1	11.4; 2/3	3.4; 0	0.6; 0	12.3; 0	6.3
Eurosondagem	14–20 May 2014	2,014	29.7; 7/8		36.9; 9/10	5.7; 1	12.5; 1	—	—	15.2; 0	7.2
CESOP–UCP	17–19 May 2014	2,085	30; 7/9		34; 8/10	5; 1	12; 2/4	3; 0/1	2; 0	14; 0	4
Pitagórica	14–18 May 2014	505	29.1		36.6	5.5	9.4	5.6	—	13.8	7.5
Aximage	7–14 May 2014	1,027	30.2; 7/8		37.8; 9/11	6.3; 2	8.8; 1/3	4.3; 0/1	0.8; 0	11.8; 0	7.6
Eurosondagem	14–22 Apr 2014	1,533	32.5; 8		37.5; 9/10	5.5; 1	10.9; 2/3	—	—	13.6; 0	5.0
Aximage	9–12 Apr 2014	613	33.2		40.9	4.9	10.8	—	—	10.2	7.7
Pitagórica	25–29 Mar 2014	506	33.4		37.3	6.4	9.8	—	—	13.1	3.9
Eurosondagem	13–19 Mar 2014	1,525	32.1; 8		36.9; 9	6.6; 1	11.9; 3	—	—	12.5; 0	4.8
Aximage	8–13 Mar 2014	755	37.4; 9		39.9; 9	6.6; 1	8.2; 2	—	—	7.9; 0	2.5
Pitagórica	24 Feb–1 Mar 2014	506	35.4		32.2	7.3	11.5	—	—	13.6	3.2
Pitagórica	20–24 Jan 2014	506	34.2		30.4	9.0	10.8	—	—	15.6	3.8
Aximage	7–10 Jan 2014	601	37.1		35.5	6.9	9.2	—	—	11.3	1.6
2009 EP election	7 June 2009	—N/a	31.7; 8	8.4; 2	26.5; 7	10.7; 3	10.6; 2	0.7; 0	—	11.4; 0	5.2

== Voter turnout ==
The table below shows voter turnout throughout election day including voters from Overseas.

Turnout	Time								
Turnout	12:00			16:00			19:00		
Turnout	2009	2014	±	2009	2014	±	2009	2014	±
Total	11.86%	12.14%	▲0.28 pp	26.82%	26.31%	▼0.51 pp	36.78%	33.67%	▼3.11 pp

== Results ==
Party and European Parliament group		Votes	%	+/–	Seats	+/–
Socialist Party	S&D	1,034,249	31.49	+4.96	8	+1
Portugal Alliance	EPP	910,647	27.73	–12.34	7	–3
Unitary Democratic Coalition	GUE/NGL	416,925	12.69	+2.05	3	+1
Earth Party	ALDE	234,788	7.15	+6.48	2	+2
Left Bloc	GUE/NGL	149,764	4.56	–6.16	1	–2
LIVRE	G/EFA	71,495	2.18	New	0	New
Party for Animals and Nature	GUE/NGL	56,431	1.72	New	0	New
Portuguese Workers' Communist Party	NI	54,708	1.67	+0.47	0	0
New Democracy Party	NI	23,082	0.70	New	0	New
Portuguese Labour Party	NI	22,542	0.69	New	0	New
People's Monarchist Party	NI	17,785	0.54	+0.14	0	0
National Renewal Party	NI	14,887	0.45	+0.08	0	0
Socialist Alternative Movement	NI	12,497	0.38	New	0	New
Portugal Pro-Life	NI	12,008	0.37	New	0	New
Democratic Party of the Atlantic	NI	5,298	0.16	New	0	New
Workers' Party of Socialist Unity	NI	3,666	0.11	–0.04	0	0
Total		3,040,772	100.00	–	21	–1
Valid votes		3,040,772	92.58	–0.81		
Invalid votes		99,724	3.04	+1.08		
Blank votes		143,957	4.38	–0.27		
Total votes		3,284,453	100.00	–		
Registered voters/turnout		9,753,568	33.67	–3.11		
Source: Comissão Nacional de Eleições

Vote share
PS	31.49%
AP	27.73%
CDU	12.69%
MPT	7.15%
BE	4.56%
L	2.18%
PAN	1.72%
PCTP/MRPP	1.67%
PND	0.70%
PTP	0.69%
PPM	0.54%
Others	1.46%
Blank/Invalid	7.42%

Seats
PS	38.10%
AP	33.33%
CDU	14.29%
MPT	9.52%
BE	4.76%

=== Distribution by European group ===
Summary of political group distribution in the 8th European Parliament (2014–2019)
Groups	Parties	Seats	Total	%
Progressive Alliance of Socialists and Democrats (S&D)	Socialist Party (PS)	8	8	38.10
European People's Party (EPP)	Social Democratic Party (PSD); People's Party (CDS–PP)	6; 1	7	33.33
European United Left–Nordic Green Left (GUE/NGL)	Portuguese Communist Party (PCP); Left Bloc (BE)	3; 1	4	19.05
Alliance of Liberals and Democrats for Europe (ALDE)	Earth Party (MPT)	2	2	9.52
Total		21	21	100.00

=== Maps ===
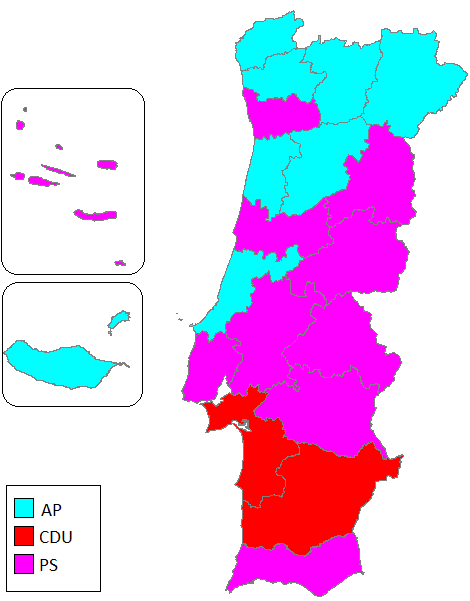
Most voted political force by district.

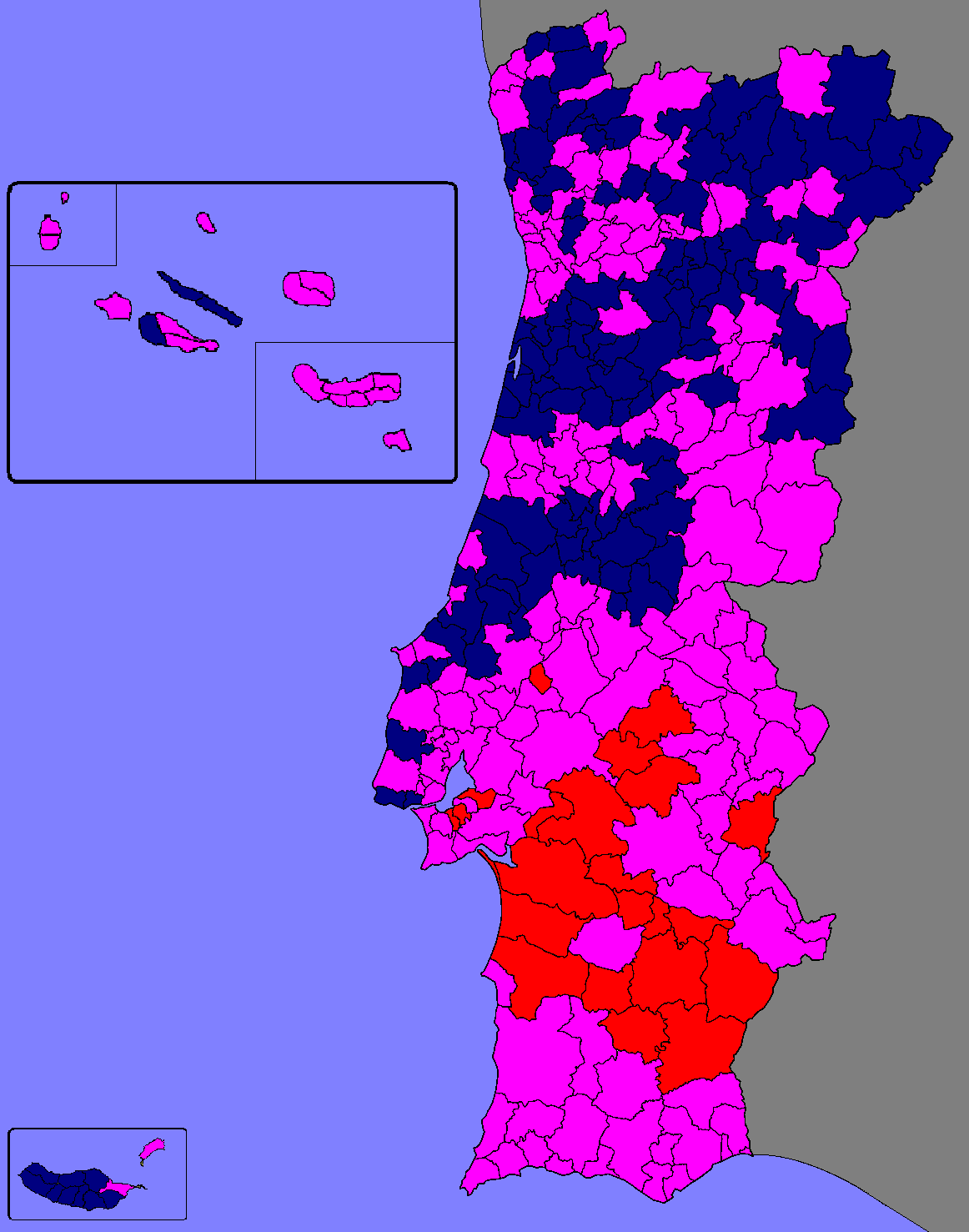
Strongest party by municipality. Pink: PS; Darkblue: PSD-CDS; Red: CDU

== See also ==
- 2014 European Parliament election
- Politics of Portugal
- List of political parties in Portugal
