= Socialist Alternative Movement =

Trotskyist political party in Portugal

Socialist Alternative Movement Movimento Alternativa Socialista
- Abbreviation: MAS
- Leader: Collective leadership
- Founded: April 2000
- Preceded by: Left Revolutionary Front
- Headquarters: Lisbon
- Newspaper: Ruptura
- Student wing: Ruptura
- Ideology: Socialism; Trotskyism
- Colours: Red
- Assembly of the Republic: 0 / 230
- European Parliament: 0 / 21
- Regional Parliaments: 0 / 104
- Local government: 0 / 2,086

Website
- www.mas.org.pt

The Socialist Alternative Movement (Portuguese: Movimento Alternativa Socialista, MAS), formerly known as the Left Revolutionary Front (Portuguese: Frente da Esquerda Revolucionária, Ruptura/FER) is a Trotskyist organization in Portugal. It was the Portuguese section of the International Workers' League (Fourth International) until they split in 2017. It ran on a joint list with the Madeira-based Labour Party in the 2015 parliamentary elections.

The party was founded as the Left Revolutionary Front (FER) in 1983. This was dissolved in 2005 and merged with the student activist movement Ruptura (which was part of the Left Bloc) to form Ruptura/FER.

The party says in its constitution that "the fight against capitalist exploitation and all forms of oppression of human beings by a socialist democratic regime, for workers' power, to ensure the transition to socialism and communism. We understand by socialism a society in which power is exercised democratically by the workers and Communism a society without classes and without the state. This implies the rejection of the "experiences" of capitalism management spearheaded by the social democrats (PS governments) or of totalitarian regimes dominated by a single Stalinist party".

The party was renamed to MAS and registered as a party in August 2013 (a first attempt at registration in March 2013 was rejected, since its statute violated the assumptions required by the Constitutional Court).

== Election results ==
=== Assembly of the Republic ===
Election	Leader	Votes	%	Seats	+/-	Government
2015	Gil Garcia	AGIR!		0 / 230		No seats
2019	Gil Garcia	3,158	0.1 (#21)	0 / 230	0	No seats
2022	Renata Cambra	6,494	0.1 (#18)	0 / 230	0	No seats

=== European Parliament ===
Election	Leader	Votes	%	Seats	+/–	EP Group
2014	Gil Garcia	12,442	0.4 (#13)	0 / 21		–
2019	Vasco Santos	6,641	0.2 (#17)	0 / 21	0	–
2024	Gil Garcia	5,057	0.1 (#14)	0 / 21	0	–

=== Presidential elections ===
Election	Candidate	Votes	%	Result
2016	Supported Marisa Matias			Lost ✗
2021	Supported Marisa Matias			Lost ✗
2026	André Pestana	10,897	0.2 (#10)	Lost ✗

== See also ==
- List of Trotskyist internationals
