= Earth Party =

Centre-right green political party in Portugal

The Earth Party Movement – Earth Party Movimento o Partido da Terra – Partido da Terra
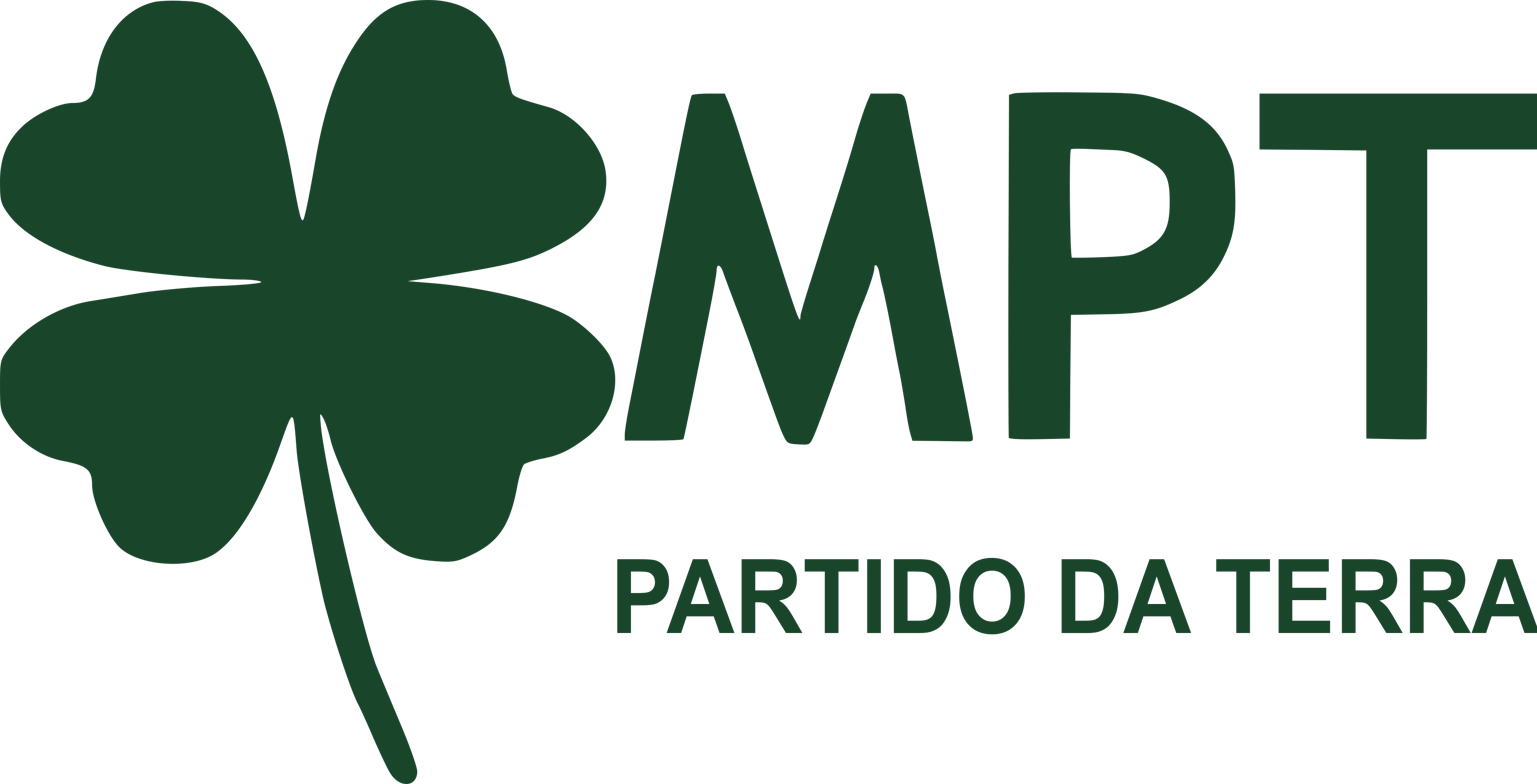
- President: Pedro Soares Pimenta
- Founded: 12 August 1993
- Split from: People's Monarchist Party
- Headquarters: Lisbon
- Youth wing: Juventude pela Terra
- Ideology: Green conservatism; Liberalism
- Political position: Centre-right
- National affiliation: AD
- International affiliation: World Ecological Parties
- Colours: Green
- Assembly of the Republic: 1 / 230
- European Parliament: 0 / 21
- Regional Parliaments: 0 / 104
- Local government (Mayors): 0 / 308
- Local government (Parishes): 1 / 3,216

Election symbol
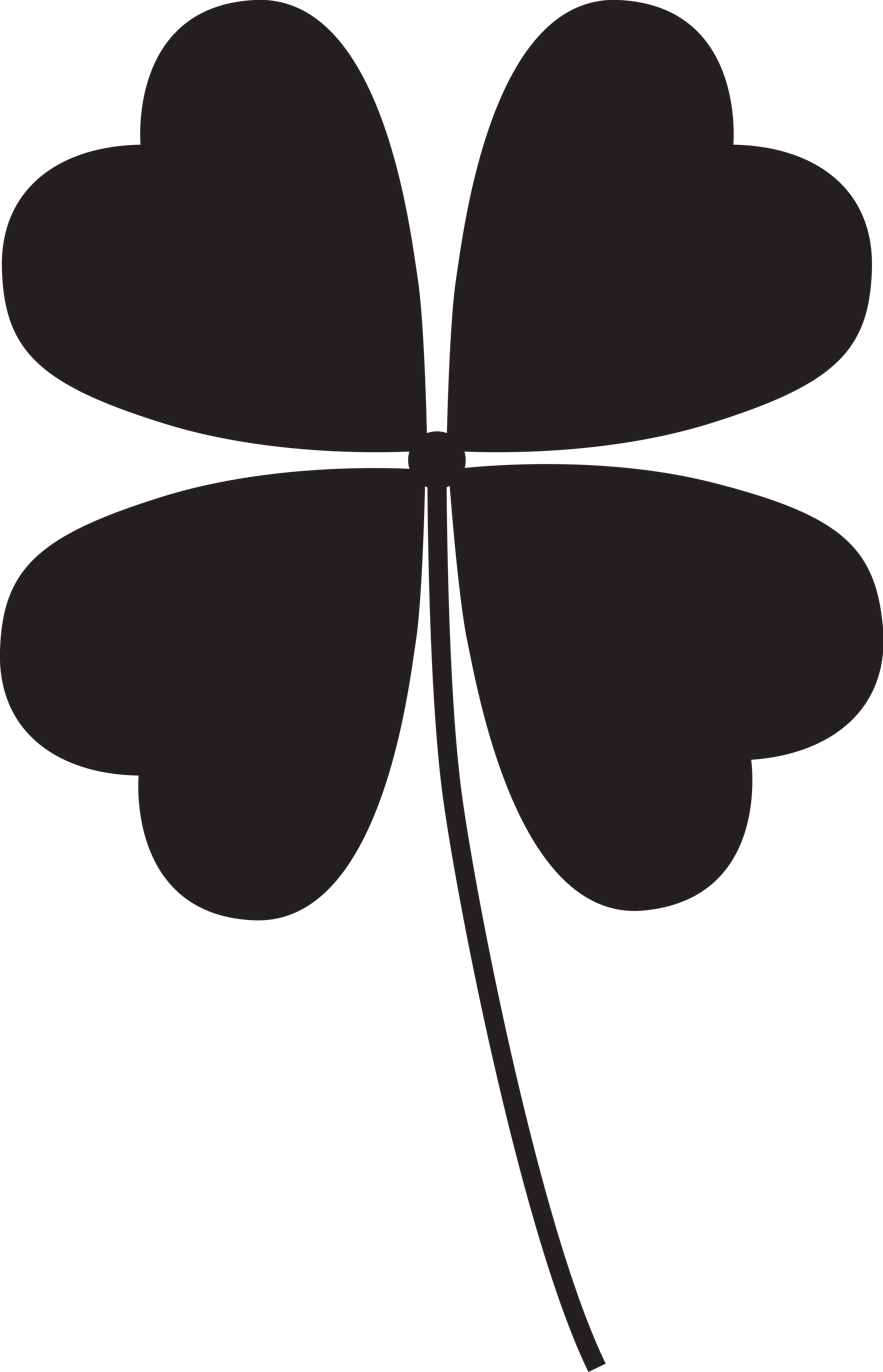

Website
- www.mpt.pt

The Earth Party (Portuguese: Partido da Terra, pronounced [pɐɾˈtiðu ðɐ ˈtɛʁɐ]), previously called The Earth Party Movement (Movimento Partido da Terra, abbreviated MPT, hence called MPT – Partido da Terra), is a green-conservative political party in Portugal, founded on 12 August 1993. Its main political priorities are the promotion of environmental-friendly policies and the preservation of the national and cultural heritage of Portugal and of the remaining Portuguese-language countries.

Between 2005 and 2009, the party had two Deputies in the Assembly of the Republic: Pedro Quartin Graça and Luís Carloto Marques, elected on the lists of the Social Democratic Party (PSD), following an agreement with its then leader, Pedro Santana Lopes.

The President of the party is Pedro Soares Pimenta, elected in 2020. In January 2026, he became a deputy in the Assembly of the Republic, as an independent temporary replacement.

The party has participated in a number of coalitions with the major centre-right parties in Portugal, namely the PSD and People's Party (CDS–PP). The MPT was a member of the European People's Party group during the eighth term of the European Parliament, having previously been a member of the Alliance of Liberals and Democrats for Europe (ALDE) and an observer member of the Liberal International.

== History ==
In April 2009, the party announced in a joint press conference with the leader of the pan-European alliance Libertas.eu Declan Ganley that it would run for the 2009 European Parliament election with an open electoral list under the banner of Libertas. While not against European integration, MPT demands more accountability and transparency from the European Union, and the pursuit of a referendum on the Lisbon Treaty in Portugal. In the elections, MPT received 24,062 votes (0.67% of the votes).

For the 2009 Portuguese legislative election, MPT formed a coalition with the Humanist Party on mainland Portugal that received 0.22% of the votes. Including MPT's votes in Azores and Madeira, where they ran a list on their own, they reached 0.28% nationwide. However, the 2009 local elections were a success in terms of the number of people elected, as MPT elected two councilors, 17 municipal assembly members and 47 parish councilor posts.

In the 2011 Portuguese legislative election, MPT stood under its own open lists throughout Portugal and achieved 0.41% of the national vote, catapulting it from 14th to 8th place overall in comparison to the 2009 Portuguese legislative election. This was largely due to its more professional campaigning – it employed a campaign manager for the first time – and the inclusion in its lists of a number of popular celebrities.

In the 2011 Madeira regional election the Party elected one Legislative Assembly member despite a fall in its number of votes of 0.3%.

MPT achieved its first major electoral success independent of any coalition, in the 2014 European Parliament election, winning 7.14% of the vote and electing two MEPs: the former chairman of the Portuguese Bar Association António Marinho e Pinto (who subsequently left the party due to personal differences with his fellow MEP) and the lawyer José Inácio Faria.

On 21 November 2014, the MPT was admitted as a full member of the Alliance of Liberals and Democrats for Europe (ALDE) at the ALDE congress in Lisbon.

MPT held its IX Party Congress on 22 November 2014 in Lisbon, where incumbent president John Rosas Baker announced his intention not to stand for reelection and was replaced by MEP José Inácio Faria.

The party contested the 2015 legislative election under its own open lists but, in what was widely considered a fiasco, failed to improve on its 2009 Portuguese legislative election result, gaining less than 0.5% of the popular vote and failing to elect any MPs to the Assembly of the Republic.

On 21 and 22 October 2018, the MPT had its bank accounts blocked due to a court decision and financial liabilities. As a consequence, the party fell into insolvency. The then-party leader Luís Vicente informed the public about this situation on 21 December 2018.

The 2019 legislative election, which were contested under MPT's own open lists, had a disastrous outcome, with the party losing practically half of its previous votes.

MPT contested the 2022 legislative election under its own open lists, ending up losing more than half of the votes previously held for the second consecutive time.

In the 2024 legislative election, MPT ran in a coalition with Alliance, called Alternative 21, with its main candidate being Nuno Afonso, a dissident of the far-right party Chega.

After the People's Monarchist Party left the Democratic Alliance, a coalition with the PSD and the CDS, MPT joined their new coalition, with Pedro Soares Pimenta, the party's president, coming in 25th place in the list for Lisbon as an independent candidate. On 1 January 2026, Pedro Pimenta became a member of the Assembly of the Republic, as a temporary replacement. He assumed the role as an independent within the PSD lists.

== Organization ==
=== List of leaders ===
- Gonçalo Ribeiro Telles – 12 August 1993 to 2 November 2002
- Paulo Trancoso – 2 November 2002 to 14 March 2009
- Pedro Quartin Graça – 14 March 2009 to 17 December 2011
- John Rosas Baker – 17 December 2011 to 22 November 2014
- José Inácio Faria – 22 November 2014 to 22 June 2019
- Manuel Ramos – 22 June 2019 to 20 December 2020
- Pedro Soares Pimenta – 20 December 2020 to present

=== Elected members ===
==== Members of the Assembly of the Republic ====
16th Legislature (2025 – present)
- Pedro Soares Pimenta (Lisbon) – since January 2026
10th Legislature (2005 – 2009)
- Pedro Quartin Graça (Lisbon)
- Luís Carloto Marques (Setúbal)

==== Members of the European Parliament ====
8th Legislature (2014 – 2019)
- António Marinho e Pinto – became independent in September 2014
- José Inácio Faria

== Election results ==
=== Assembly of the Republic ===
Election	Leader	Votes	%	Seats	+/-	Government
1995	Gonçalo Ribeiro Telles	8,235	0.1 (#10)	0 / 230		No seats
1999	Gonçalo Ribeiro Telles	19,938	0.4 (#7)	0 / 230	0	No seats
2002	Gonçalo Ribeiro Telles	15,540	0.3 (#7)	0 / 230	0	No seats
2005	Paulo Trancoso	w. PPD/PSD		2 / 230	▲2	Opposition
2009	Pedro Quartin Graça	Ecology and Humanism		0 / 230	▼2	No seats
2011	Pedro Quartin Graça	22,705	0.4 (#8)	0 / 230	0	No seats
2015	José Inácio Faria	22,596	0.4 (#11)	0 / 230	0	No seats
2019	Manuel Ramos	12,952	0.2 (#14)	0 / 230	0	No seats
2022	Pedro Soares Pimenta	6,437	0.1 (#16)	0 / 230	0	No seats
2024	Pedro Soares Pimenta	Alternative 21		0 / 230	0	No seats
2025	Pedro Soares Pimenta	478	0.0 (#19)	0 / 230	0	No seats

=== European Parliament ===
Election	List Leader	Votes	%	Seats	+/–	EP Group
1994		12,955	0.4 (#8)	0 / 25		–
1999	Paulo Trancoso	13,924	0.4 (#8)	0 / 25	0	–
2004	Luís Filipe Marques	13,671	0.4 (#9)	0 / 24	0	–
2009	Pedro Quartin Graça	24,062	0.7 (#8)	0 / 22	0	–
2014	António Marinho e Pinto	234,788	7.2 (#4)	2 / 21	▲2	ALDE
2019	Paulo de Morais	with NC		0 / 21	▼2	–
2024	Manuel Carreira	4,610	0.1 (#15)	0 / 21	0	–

=== Regional Assemblies ===
Region	Election	Leader	Votes	%	Seats	+/-	Government
Azores	2024	José Olívio Arranhado	Alternative 21		0 / 57	0	No seats
Madeira	2025	Valter Rodrigues	PTP/MPT/RIR		0 / 47	0	No seats
