= António Marinho e Pinto =

Portuguese lawyer and politician

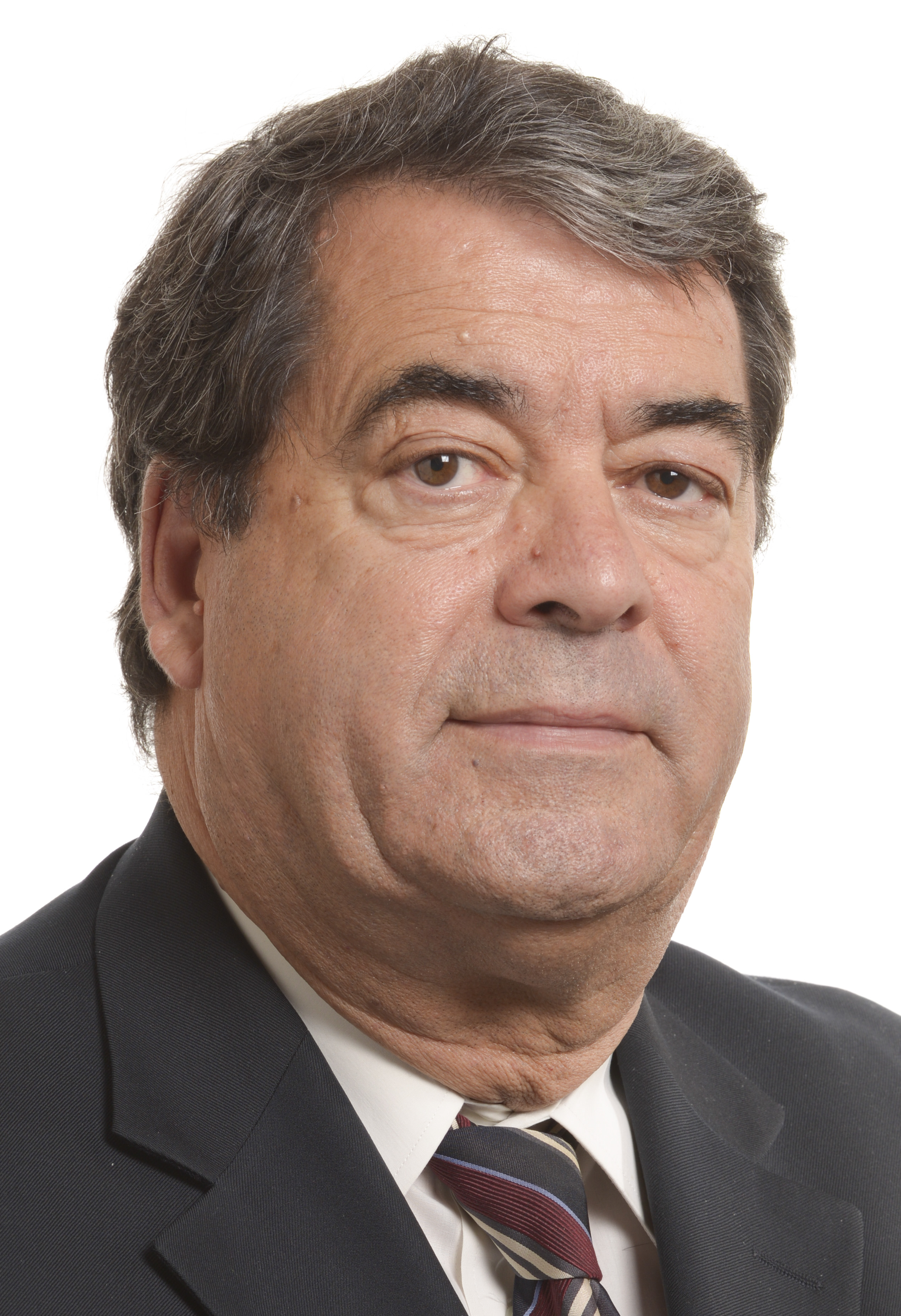
- Official portrait as an MEP, 2014

Member of the European Parliament
- In office 1 July 2014 – 1 July 2019
- Constituency: Portugal

President of the Portuguese Bar Association
- In office 2008–2013
- Preceded by: Rogério Alves
- Succeeded by: Elina Fraga

Personal details
- Born: António de Sousa Marinho e Pinto; 10 September 1950 (age 76) Vila Chã do Marão, Amarante, Portugal
- Party: Democratic Republican Party (2014-present)
- Children: Two daughters
- Education: University of Coimbra
- Occupation: Politician
- Profession: Journalist, lawyer

António de Sousa Marinho e Pinto (born 10 September 1950, in Vila Chã do Marão, Amarante) is a Portuguese lawyer and former journalist. He was president of the Portuguese Bar Association from 2008 to 2013 and is well known for his controversial speeches. In 2014, he ran for the election for the European Parliament as top candidate for the Earth Party (MPT) and succeeded in being elected, along with the second candidate of the list, José Inácio Faria. He left MPT to found his own party, the Democratic Republican Party, being its first leader until 2020.
