= Opinion polling for the 2025 Portuguese local elections =

In the run up to the 2025 Portuguese local elections, various organisations will carry out opinion polling to gauge voting intention in several municipalities across Portugal. Results of such polls are displayed in this article. The date range for these opinion polls are from the previous local elections, held on 26 September 2021, to the day the next elections will be held, on 12 October 2025.

== Polling ==
=== Alcobaça ===
Polling firm/Link	Fieldwork date	Sample size	PSD	PS	CH	CDU	IL	O	Lead
2025 local election	12 Oct 2025	—N/a	58.6; 5	16.6; 1	13.4; 1	3.6; 0	4.1; 0	3.7; 0	42.0
IPOM (Note: Results presented here exclude Undecideds: 13.4%; Would not vote: 5.8%; and Doesn't respond: 15.3% . With their inclusion results are: PSD: 36.0%; CH: 10.3%; PS: 9.8%; CDU: 4.6%; IL: 4.3%; Others/Invalid: 0.5%.)	2–13 Sep 2025	417	55.0	15.0	15.7	6.6	7.0	0.8	39.3
IPOM (Note: Results presented here exclude Undecideds: 13.4%; Would not vote: 5.7%; and Doesn't respond: 14.0% . With their inclusion results are: PSD: 36.7%; CH: 10.9%; PS: 10.1%; IL: 4.7%; CDU: 4.1%; Others/Invalid: 0.5%.); Seat projection	2–3 Sep 2025	387	54.8; 5	15.1; 1	16.3; 1	6.1; 0	7.0; 0	0.7; 0	38.5
2021 local election	26 Sep 2021	—N/a	43.2; 4	30.0; 3	4.6; 0	3.5; 0	3.4; 0	15.3; 0	13.2

=== Almada ===
Exit poll

Polling firm/Link	Fieldwork date	Sample size	PS	CDU	PSD	CDS	BE L	CH	PAN	IL	O	Lead
2025 local election	12 Oct 2025	—N/a	29.1; 4	20.6; 3	19.4; 2	0.7; 0	4.6; 0	18.2; 2	1.7; 0	3.3; 0	2.4	8.5
Intercampus	12 Oct 2025	4,122	28.4– 32.4; 3/5	20.7– 24.7; 2/4	16.8– 20.8; 1/3		2.6– 6.6; 0/1	14.5– 18.5; 1/3	0.0– 3.4; 0/1	1.3– 5.3; 0/1		7.7
2021 local election	26 Sep 2021	—N/a	39.9; 5	29.7; 4	10.7; 1		6.8; 1	5.6; 0	2.3; 0	2.0; 0	3.0	10.2

=== Alenquer ===
Polling firm/Link	Fieldwork date	Sample size	PS	PSD/CDS/IL PPM/MPT/NC			CDU	CH	Ind. (TP)	O	Lead
Polling firm/Link	Fieldwork date	Sample size	PS	PSD	CDS	IL	CDU	CH	Ind. (TP)	O	Lead
2025 local election	12 Oct 2025	—N/a	31.3; 3	28.5; 2			6.9; 0	14.5; 1	16.9; 1	1.9; 0	2.8
Multidados (Note: Results presented here exclude Undecideds: 21.7% and Would not vote: 10.3% . With their inclusion results are: PS: 27.9%; Independent movements: 16.0%; CH: 8.6%; PSD: 7.4%; CDU: 1.7%; BE:0.6%; IL: 0.6%; Others/Invalid: 5.2%.)	17 Feb–11 Mar 2025	350	41.0	10.9	—N/a	0.9	2.5	12.7	23.5	8.6 (Note: BE: 0.9%; Others: 7.7%.)	17.5
2021 local election	26 Sep 2021	—N/a	42.4; 5	14.6; 1	6.4; 0	—N/a	11.5; 1	7.4; 0	—N/a	17.7	27.8

=== Aveiro ===
Polling firm/Link	Fieldwork date	Sample size	PSD CDS PPM	PS	BE	CH	CDU	IL	PAN	L	O	Lead
2025 local election	12 Oct 2025	—N/a	39.4; 4	33.7; 4	2.0; 0	10.9; 1	1.5; 0	5.2; 0	0.9; 0	2.2; 0	4.3	6.4
GfK	4–20 Aug 2025 (Note: Internal PS poll conducted by the party's national leadership that was leaked by the local press.)	603	31	36	2	19	1	2	1	2	6	5
2021 local election	26 Sep 2021	—N/a	51.3; 6	26.0; 3	6.4; 0	4.0; 0	3.3; 0	2.3; 0	—N/a	—N/a	6.7	25.3

=== Batalha ===
Polling firm/Link	Fieldwork date	Sample size	Ind. (BTMI)	PSD	CDS	CH	IL	CDU	O	Lead
2025 local election	12 Oct 2025	—N/a	20.7; 2	44.2; 4	16.0; 1	10.0; 0	4.3; 0	1.0; 0	3.8; 0	23.5
IPOM (Note: Results presented here exclude Undecideds: 14.3%; Would not vote: 2.3%; and Doesn't respond: 17.6% . With their inclusion results are: PSD: 28.2%; Independent: 16.2%; CDS: 12.5%; CH: 6.0%; IL: 1.4%; CDU: 0.5%; Others/Invalid: 1.2%.); Seat projection	26–29 Sep 2025	433	24.5; 2	42.7; 4	18.9; 1	9.1; 0	2.1; 0	0.8; 0	1.8; 0	18.2
2021 local election	26 Sep 2021	—N/a	46.5; 4	35.5; 3	4.8; 0	4.7; 0	3.1; 0	1.1; 0	4.3; 0	11.0

=== Braga ===
Exit poll

Polling firm/Link	Fieldwork date	Sample size	PSD CDS PPM	PS PAN		CDU	CH	BE	IL	L	Ind. (RS)	O	Lead
2025 local election	12 Oct 2025	—N/a	24.5; 3	24.2; 3		3.1; 0	10.4; 1	0.9; 0	12.3; 1	1.6; 0	20.0; 3	2.9; 0	0.3
CESOP–UCP	12 Oct 2025	3,259	20–24; 2/4	22–26; 2/4		2–4; 0	9–11; 1	0–1; 0	13–16; 1/2	1–2; 0	19–23; 2/3	1–4; 0	2
Intercampus (Note: Results presented here exclude Undecideds: 17.9% . With their inclusion results are: PS/PAN: 25.7%; PSD/CDS/PPM: 19.4%; Ricardo Silva: 9.8%; CH: 7.5%; IL: 5.8%; CDU: 4.4%; L: 2.0%; BE: 1.5%; Others/Invalid: 6.0%.)	29 Aug–10 Sep 2025	801	23.6	31.3		5.4	9.1	1.8	7.1	2.4	11.9	7.3	7.7
2021 local election	26 Sep 2021	—N/a	42.9; 6	30.7; 4	2.7; 0	6.7; 1	4.7; 0	4.2; 0	2.9; 0	0.6; 0	—N/a	4.6	12.2

=== Bragança ===
Polling firm/Link	Fieldwork date	Sample size	PSD	PS	CH	CDU	IL	Ind. (SB)	O	Lead
2025 local election	12 Oct 2025	—N/a	41.4; 3	50.3; 4	2.2; 0	0.8; 0	2.5; 0	0.6; 0	2.2; 0	8.9
Aximage	15–29 Sep 2025	501	35	48	2	3	3	1	8	13
2021 local election	26 Sep 2021	—N/a	57.5; 5	27.0; 2	5.9; 0	2.2; 0	1.3; 0	—N/a	6.1; 0	30.5

=== Cascais ===
Polling firm/Link	Fieldwork date	Sample size	PSD CDS	PS	CH	CDU	BE L PAN	IL	Ind. (JMJ)	ND NC	O	Lead
2025 local election	12 Oct 2025	—N/a	33.8; 5	16.2; 2	14.5; 2	3.9; 0	4.5; 0	6.4; 0	14.8; 2	3.0; 0	3.0; 0	17.6
Metris	15–23 Sep 2025	603 (Note: Results presented here exclude Undecideds: 17.9%; Would not vote: 3.5%; and Doesn't respond: 2.7% . With their inclusion results are: PSD/CDS: 25.2%; CH: 12.3%; João Maria Jonet (JMJ): 11.3%; PS: 7.1%; IL: 6.3%; ND: 4.1%; BE: 3.0%; CDU: 2.2%; Others/Invalid: 6.1%.)	33.2	9.4	16.2	2.9	3.9	8.3	14.6	5.4	6.1	17.0
Metris	26 May–8 Jun 2025	805 (Note: Results presented here exclude Undecideds: 18.0%; Would not vote: 3.0%; and Doesn't respond: 3.2% . With their inclusion results are: PSD/CDS: 32.6%; CH: 10.2%; João Maria Jonet (JMJ): 9.2%; IL: 8.3%; PS: 6.9%; António Pinto Pereira: 2.4%; BE: 2.0%; CDU: 1.5%; Others/Invalid: 2.6%.)	43.1	9.1	13.5	2.0	2.6	11.0	12.2	3.2	2.6	29.6
Metris	26 May–8 Jun 2025	805 (Note: Scenario of the PS not on the ballot. Results presented here exclude Undecideds: 18.7%; Would not vote: 3.1%; and Doesn't respond: 3.2% . With their inclusion results are: PSD/CDS: 33.0%; João Maria Jonet (JMJ): 12.6%; CH: 10.5%; IL: 8.4%; CDU: 2.2%; António Pinto Pereira: 2.0%; BE: 2.0%; Others/Invalid: 4.3%.)	44.0	—N/a	14.0	2.9	2.7	11.2	16.8	2.7	5.7	27.2
Metris	26 May–8 Jun 2025	805 (Note: Scenario of the PS and António Pinto Pereira not on the ballot. Results presented here exclude Undecideds: 18.4%; Would not vote: 3.2%; and Doesn't respond: 3.3% . With their inclusion results are: PSD/CDS: 34.4%; João Maria Jonet (JMJ): 11.6%; CH: 10.3%; IL: 9.0%; CDU: 2.2%; BE: 2.2%; Others/Invalid: 5.3%.)	45.8	—N/a	13.7	3.1	2.9	12.0	15.4	—N/a	5.3	30.4
Metris	15–21 Oct 2024	402 (Note: Results presented here exclude Undecideds: 12%; Would not vote: 8%; and Doesn't respond: 4% . With their inclusion results are: PSD/CDS: 27%; PS: 18%; CH: 14%; João Maria Jonet (JMJ): 11%; CDU: 2%; Others/Invalid: 4%.)	36	24	18	3	—N/a	—N/a	14	—N/a	5	12
Metris	15–21 Oct 2024	402 (Note: Results presented here exclude Undecideds: 13%; Would not vote: 5%; and Doesn't respond: 4% . With their inclusion results are: PSD/CDS: 25%; PS: 18%; João Maria Jonet (JMJ) supported by IL: 16%; CH: 13%; CDU: 2%; Others/Invalid: 3%.)	32	23	17	3	—N/a	21		—N/a	4	9
2021 local election	26 Sep 2021	—N/a	52.6; 7	21.6; 3	7.4; 1	5.4; 0	3.7; 0 (Note: Left Bloc result in 2021.)	4.3; 0	—N/a	—N/a	5.0	31.0

=== Coimbra ===
Exit poll

Polling firm/Link	Fieldwork date	Sample size	PSD CDS IL PPM NC Volt MPT		PS L PAN		CDU	CH	BE	O	Lead
2025 local election	12 Oct 2025	—N/a	37.8; 5		42.1; 5		4.8; 0	8.2; 1	2.9; 0	4.2; 0	4.3
CESOP–UCP	12 Oct 2025	5,036	35–39; 4/5		42–46; 5/7		4–6; 0	7–10; 1	2–4; 0	1–5; 0	7
2021 local election	26 Sep 2021	—N/a	43.9; 6	1.7; 0	32.7; 4	1.5; 0	7.5; 1	2.3; 0	—N/a	10.4; 0	11.2

=== Covilhã ===
Polling firm/Link	Fieldwork date	Sample size	PS	CDS IL	PSD	CDU	CH	Ind. (CM)	O	Lead
2025 local election	12 Oct 2025	—N/a	40.0; 4	9.2; 1	18.2; 1	5.9; 0	7.5; 0	15.6; 1	3.6	21.8
Aximage (Note: Results presented here exclude undecideds (26%). With their inclusion results are: PS: 44%; PSD/CDS/IL: 20%; CH: 4%; CDU: 3%; Others/Invalid: 3%.)	8–23 Jan 2025	500	59.5	27.0		4.1	5.4	—N/a	4.1	32.5
2021 local election	26 Sep 2021	—N/a	46.2; 4	30.4; 3		9.7; 0	1.7; 0	—N/a	11.9; 0	15.8

=== Faro ===
Exit poll

Polling firm/Link	Fieldwork date	Sample size	PSD CDS IL PAN MPT		PS	CDU	CH	BE	L	O	Lead
2025 local election	12 Oct 2025	—N/a	31.6; 3		39.5; 4	3.7; 0	17.3; 2	1.1; 0	2.0; 0	4.9; 0	7.9
CESOP–UCP	12 Oct 2025	2,293	32–36; 3/4		39–44; 4/5	3–4; 0	13–16; 1	1–2; 0	1–3; 0	3–7; 0	7–8
ICS/ISCTE/Pitagórica	12 Oct 2025	4,326	30.9–35.9; 3/5		36.0– 41.2; 3/5	2.4– 5.4; 0/1	14.0– 17.8; 1/2	1.0– 3.0; 0/1	0.9– 2.9; 0/1		5.1– 5.3
Intercampus	12 Oct 2025	3,498	30.7–34.7; 2/4		36.5– 40.5; 3/5	2.2– 6.2; 0/1	14.9– 18.9; 1/2	0.0– 3.7; 0/1	0.3– 4.3; 0/1	1.7– 5.7	5.8
Pitagórica	25–30 Sep 2025	504	30.6		31.6	7.8	20.9	1.9	2.1	5.1	1.0
ICS/ISCTE	23–28 Jul 2025	802	29		31	5	23	5	—N/a	7	2
2021 local election	26 Sep 2021	—N/a	47.8; 6 (Note: PSD/CDS/IL/MPT/PPM coalition result in 2021.)	2.7; 0 (Note: People Animals Nature result in 2021.)	30.6; 3	6.5; 0	5.1; 0	4.1; 0	—N/a	3.3	17.2

=== Figueira da Foz ===
Polling firm/Link	Fieldwork date	Sample size	PSD/CDS			PS	CDU	BE L PAN	CH	O	Lead
Polling firm/Link	Fieldwork date	Sample size	PSL	PSD	CDS	PS	CDU	BE L PAN	CH	O	Lead
2025 local election	12 Oct 2025	—N/a	58.9; 6			19.5; 2	3.3; 0	3.2; 0	10.0; 1	5.1; 0	39.4
Intercampus (Note: Results presented here exclude undecideds (10.2%). With their inclusion results are: PSL: 42.1%; PS: 22.6%; PSD: 15.2%; CH: 2.9%; CDU: 2.3%; BE: 1.8%; CDS: 0.4%; Others/Invalid: 2.4%.)	18 Jul–3 Aug 2024	601	46.1	16.9	0.5	25.2	2.6	2.0	3.2	2.7	20.9
Aximage	27 Feb–10 Mar 2023	486	66	3	0	18	1	1	—N/a	11	48
2021 local election	26 Sep 2021	—N/a	40.4; 4	10.8; 1	1.2; 0	38.4; 4	2.7; 0	2.5; 0	—N/a	4.5	2.0

=== Funchal ===
Polling firm/Link	Fieldwork date	Sample size	PSD CDS	PS	BE	PAN	MPT	ADN	CDU	CH	JPP	IL	PTP	L	O	Lead
2025 local election	12 Oct 2025	—N/a	41.3; 6	12.8; 1	1.0; 0	1.1; 0	0.3; 0	0.5; 0	2.2; 0	14.8; 2	19.1; 2	2.4; 0	0.6; 0	0.6; 0	3.3; 0	22.2
Aximage; Seat projection	28 Sep–2 Oct 2025	403	46.0; 6	11.2; 1	0.5; 0	1.4; 0	0.5; 0	0.8; 0	1.7; 0	13.7; 2	18.4; 2	3.0; 0	0.4; 0	0.5; 0	2.0 (Note: ND: 0.3%; RIR: 0.0%; Blank/Invalid: 1.7%.); 0	27.6
Intercampus (Note: Results presented here exclude Undecideds: 25.1% . With their inclusion results are: PSD/CDS: 32.9%; PS: 15.6%; JPP: 9.4%; CH: 7.5%; IL: 3.0%; CDU: 1.6%; BE: 0.8%; L: 0.8%; PTP: 0.5%; ADN: 0.5%; PAN: 0.5%; MPT: 0.0%; Others/Invalid: 1.8%.); Seat projection	11–29 Sep 2025	403	43.9; 6	20.8; 3	1.1; 0	0.7; 0	0.0; 0	0.7; 0	2.1; 0	10.0; 1	12.6; 1	4.0; 0	0.7; 0	1.1; 0	2.3 (Note: RIR: 0.4%; ND: 0.4%; Blank/Invalid: 1.2%.); 0	23.1
2021 local election	26 Sep 2021	—N/a	47.0; 6	39.7; 5					2.9; 0	2.6; 0	1.7; 0	1.3; 0	1.1; 0	0.5; 0	3.2; 0	7.3

=== Gondomar ===
Polling firm/Link	Fieldwork date	Sample size	PS	CDS	PSD/IL		CDU	BE	CH	PAN	Ind. (PG)	O	Lead
Polling firm/Link	Fieldwork date	Sample size	PS	CDS	PSD	IL	CDU	BE	CH	PAN	Ind. (PG)	O	Lead
2025 local election	12 Oct 2025	—N/a	39.3; 6	1.2; 0	25.0; 3		5.9; 0	1.3; 0	15.6; 2	1.5; 0	2.9; 0	7.3; 0	14.3
Multidados; Seat projection	29 Sep–2 Oct 2025	300	49.2; 5/7	1.1; 0	17.7; 2/3		4.4; 0	1.0; 0	13.8; 1/2	1.0; 0	7.7; 0/1	4.1; 0	31.5
2021 local election	26 Sep 2021	—N/a	46.9; 7	21.6; 3		2.7; 0	10.8; 1	5.8; 0	4.0; 0	2.9; 0	—N/a	5.3	25.3

=== Leiria ===
Polling firm/Link	Fieldwork date	Sample size	PS	PSD	CH	CDS	CDU	BE L PAN			IL	ADN	O	Lead
2025 local election	12 Oct 2025	—N/a	54.1; 7	21.8; 3	11.5; 1	2.0; 0	1.5; 0	1.5; 0			3.7; 0	0.5; 0	3.4; 0	32.3
IPOM (Note: Results presented here exclude Undecideds: 15.0%; Would not vote: 5.3%; and Doesn't respond: 9.1% . With their inclusion results are: PS: 37.7%; CH: 13.3%; PSD: 12.7%; CDS: 1.7%; IL: 0.8%; BE/L/PAN: 0.4%; CDU: 0.4%; ADN: 0.2%; Others/Invalid: 3.2%.); Seat projection	24–26 Sep 2025	472	53.6; 7	18.0; 2	18.9; 2	2.4; 0	0.6; 0	0.6; 0			1.1; 0	0.3; 0	4.5; 0	34.7
2021 local election	26 Sep 2021	—N/a	52.5; 8	22.4; 3	5.7; 0	4.2; 0	2.5; 0	2.4; 0	1.8; 0	0.7; 0 (Note: Livre result in 2021.)	2.4; 0	—N/a	5.4; 0	30.1

=== Lisbon ===
Exit poll

Polling firm/Link	Fieldwork date	Sample size	PSD CDS IL		PS L BE PAN			CDU	CH	ADN	ND	PPM PTP	O	Lead
2025 local election	12 Oct 2025	—N/a	41.7; 8		34.0; 6			10.1; 1	10.1; 2	0.4; 0	0.3; 0	0.3; 0	3.1; 0	7.7
CESOP–UCP	12 Oct 2025	5,658	37–42; 6/9		37–42; 6/9			8–11; 1/2	7–10; 1/2	0–1; 0	0–1; 0	0–1; 0	1–5; 0	Tie
ICS/ISCTE/Pitagórica	12 Oct 2025	9,832	36.8–42.0; 6/8		33.7–38.9; 6/8			9.0– 12.4; 1/3	7.7– 11.1; 1/2					3.1
Intercampus	12 Oct 2025	8,700	37.9–41.9; 6/8		34.8–38.8; 6/8			8.9– 12.9; 1/3	7.0– 11.0; 0/2				1.4– 5.4	3.1
CESOP–UCP; Seat projection	27–29 Sep 2025	1,066	35; 6/8		36; 6/8			8; 1/2	12; 2	1; 0	1; 0	2; 0	5; 0	1
Pitagórica	23–28 Sep 2025	625	38.7		35.7			11.7	9.6	0.6	0.6	—N/a	3.1	3.0
ICS/ISCTE	13–23 Sep 2025	807	36		35			6	16	2	1	—N/a	4	1
ICS/ISCTE	14–27 Jul 2025	800	41		36			5	14	—N/a	—N/a	—N/a	4	5
2021 local election	26 Sep 2021	—N/a	34.3; 7 (Note: PSD/CDS/A/MPT/PPM coalition result in 2021.)	4.2; 0 (Note: Liberal Initiative result in 2021.)	33.3; 7 (Note: PS/LIVRE coalition result in 2021.)	6.2; 1	2.7; 0	10.5; 2	4.4; 0	0.1; 0	—N/a	—N/a	4.3; 0	1.0

=== Loures ===
Exit poll

Polling firm/Link	Fieldwork date	Sample size	PS	CDU	PSD CDS		CH	BE L PAN	IL	O	Lead
2025 local election	12 Oct 2025	—N/a	43.8; 6	11.0; 1	14.9; 2		20.7; 2	3.4; 0	2.5; 0	3.7; 0	23.1
CESOP–UCP	12 Oct 2025	5,732	44–48; 5/7	9–12; 1	14–17; 1		17–20; 2	2–5; 0	2–4; 0	1–5; 0	27– 28
2021 local election	26 Sep 2021	—N/a	31.5; 4	29.0; 4	14.0; 2	1.5; 0	8.4; 1	3.9; 0	3.3; 0	8.4; 0	2.5

=== Marinha Grande ===
Polling firm/Link	Fieldwork date	Sample size	Ind. (MPM)		PS	CDU	CH	O	Lead
2025 local election	12 Oct 2025	—N/a	24.0; 2		34.7; 3	17.5; 1	18.7; 1	5.0	10.7
IPOM (Note: Results presented here exclude Undecideds: 18.0%; Would not vote: 9.8%; and Doesn't respond: 20.6% . With their inclusion results are: MPM: 13.9%; PS: 13.1%; CH: 12.9%; CDU: 10.8%; Others/Invalid: 1.0%.); Seat projection	17–18 Sep 2025	389	26.9; 2		25.3; 2	19.7; 1	25.0; 2	1.9; 0	1.6
2021 local election	26 Sep 2021	—N/a	38.3; 3	6.9; 0 (Note: Social Democratic Party result in 2021.)	21.9; 2	20.5; 2	3.4; 0	9.0; 0	16.4

=== Nazaré ===
Polling firm/Link	Fieldwork date	Sample size	PS	PSD	CDU	BE	CH	O	Lead
2025 local election	12 Oct 2025	—N/a	35.4; 3	38.6; 3	10.6; 0	1.6; 0	11.0; 1	2.8	3.2
IPOM (Note: Results presented here exclude Undecideds: 15.2%; Would not vote: 17.0%; and Doesn't respond: 15.2% . With their inclusion results are: PSD: 15.2%; PS: 14.9%; CH: 12.4%; CDU: 7.6%; BE: 1.5%; Others/Invalid: 1.0%.)	5–15 Sep 2025	395	28.3	28.9	14.5	2.9	23.6	1.9	0.6
IPOM (Note: Results presented here exclude Undecideds: 16.1%; Would not vote: 16.3%; and Doesn't respond: 15.2% . With their inclusion results are: PSD: 15.2%; PS: 14.4%; CH: 12.7%; CDU: 7.6%; BE: 1.7%; Others/Invalid: 0.8%.); Seat projection	4–5 Sep 2025	357	27.5; 2	29.0; 2	14.5; 1	3.2; 0	24.2; 2	1.5; 0	1.5
2021 local election	26 Sep 2021	—N/a	44.9; 4	28.2; 2	14.2; 1	5.1; 0	—N/a	7.5; 0	16.7

=== Ourém ===
Polling firm/Link	Fieldwork date	Sample size	PSD CDS	PS	CH	CDU	O	Lead
2025 local election	12 Oct 2025	—N/a	66.6; 5	11.8; 1	15.5; 1	1.9; 0	4.1	51.1
IPOM (Note: Results presented here exclude Undecideds: 15.4%; Would not vote: 4.0%; and Doesn't respond: 14.6% . With their inclusion results are: PSD: 39.8%; CH: 11.4%; PS: 11.1%; CDU: 2.5%; Others/Invalid: 1.3%.); Seat projection	12–13 Sep 2025	377	60.2; 5	16.8; 1	17.2; 1	3.8; 0	2.0; 0	43.0
2021 local election	26 Sep 2021	—N/a	62.8; 6	18.8; 1	4.9; 0	2.2; 0	11.3; 0	44.0

=== Penafiel ===
Polling firm/Link	Fieldwork date	Sample size	PSD CDS	PS	CH	CDU	BE	O	Lead
2025 local election	12 Oct 2025	—N/a	53.1; 6	32.8; 3	8.1; 0	1.2; 0	0.7; 0	4.1; 0	20.3
IPOM (Note: Results presented here exclude Undecideds: 29.9% and Would not vote: 2.4% . With their inclusion results are: PSD/CDS: 33.6%; PS: 18.8%; CH: 7.7%; CDU: 1.0%; BE: 0.9%; IL: 0.5%; Others/Invalid: 5.3%.)	20–27 Jan 2025	586	49.6	27.7	11.4	1.5	1.3	8.5 (Note: IL: 0.7%; Others: 7.8%.)	21.9
2021 local election	26 Sep 2021	—N/a	60.5; 6	30.9; 3	2.2; 0	1.9; 0	1.7; 0	2.8	29.6

=== Pombal ===
Polling firm/Link	Fieldwork date	Sample size	PSD	PS	CH	IL	BE	CDU	CDS	Ind. (LC)	O	Lead
2025 local election	12 Oct 2025	—N/a	58.2; 5	13.9; 1	9.9; 1	2.0; 0	1.0; 0	1.0; 0	1.4; 0	8.2; 0	4.4	44.3
IPOM (Note: Results presented here exclude Undecideds: 14.2%; Would not vote: 6.0%; and Doesn't respond: 16.0% . With their inclusion results are: PSD: 37.4%; PS: 10.0%; CH: 8.1%; Independent: 3.3%; CDU: 1.4%; IL: 1.2%; BE: 0.2%; CDS: 0.2%; Others/Invalid: 1.9%.); Seat projection	10–11 Sep 2025	430	58.7; 5	15.7; 1	12.7; 1	1.9; 0	0.3; 0	2.2; 0	0.3; 0	5.2; 0	3.0	43.0
2021 local election	26 Sep 2021	—N/a	61.1; 5	21.0; 2	3.7; 0	3.2; 0	2.9; 0	1.8; 0	—N/a	—N/a	6.3	40.1

=== Porto ===
Exit poll

Polling firm/Link	Fieldwork date	Sample size	Ind. (FA)	PS	PSD IL CDS	CDU	BE	CH	L	NC PPM	O	Lead
2025 local election	12 Oct 2025	—N/a	5.1; 0	35.5; 6	37.4; 6	3.9; 0	1.8; 0	8.2; 1	3.4; 0	1.9; 0	2.8; 0	1.9
CESOP–UCP	12 Oct 2025	6,124	4–6; 0/1	33–37; 5/7	36–40; 5/7	4–6; 0/1	1–3; 0	6–9; 1	3–5; 0	1–3; 0	2–7; 0	3
ICS/ISCTE/Pitagórica	12 Oct 2025	7,532	3.8–6.8; 0/1	32.0–37.2; 5/7	34.2–39.4; 5/7	2.7–5.5; 0/1	1.1–3.1; 0/1	6.8–10.2; 0/2	1.1–3.1; 0/1	1.4–3.4; 0/1		2.2
Intercampus	12 Oct 2025	5,890	3.5–7.5; 0/1	30.8–34.8; 4/6	37.0–41.0; 6/8	2.5–6.5; 0/1	0.1–4.1; 0/1	6.2–10.2; 0/2	1.3–5.3; 0/1		2.7–6.7	6.2
Pitagórica	29 Sep–4 Oct 2025	625	7.0	32.9	33.1	3.3	2.9	10.4	3.9	3.3	3.2	0.2
CESOP–UCP; Seat projection	27–28 Sep 2025	1,163	6; 0/1	29; 4/5	32; 4/6	5; 0/1	3; 0	10; 1/2	6; 0/1	4; 0	5; 0	3
ICS/ISCTE	5–16 Sep 2025	805	3	37	34	4	3	10	3	2	4	3
ICS/ISCTE	17 Jun–2 Jul 2025	805	5	36	33	4	3	12	1	2	4	3
2021 local election	26 Sep 2021	—N/a	40.7; 6	18.0; 3	17.2; 2	7.5; 1	6.3; 1	3.0; 0	0.5; 0	—N/a	6.8; 0	22.7

=== Porto de Mós ===
Polling firm/Link	Fieldwork date	Sample size	PSD	PS	CH	CDU	IL	O	Lead
2025 local election	12 Oct 2025	—N/a	62.8; 5	13.6; 1	11.5; 1	1.4; 0	6.7; 0	4.1	49.2
IPOM (Note: Results presented here exclude Undecideds: 10.0%; Would not vote: 0.5%; and Doesn't respond: 18.5% . With their inclusion results are: PSD: 44.8%; CH: 13.8%; PS: 10.3%; IL: 0.8%; CDU: 0.5%; Others/Invalid: 1.0%.); Seat projection	16–17 Sep 2025	400	62.9; 5	14.5; 1	19.4; 1	0.7; 0	1.1; 0	1.4; 0	43.5
2021 local election	26 Sep 2021	—N/a	55.9; 4	35.9; 3	3.0; 0	1.7; 0	—N/a	3.5; 0	20.0

=== São João da Madeira ===
Polling firm/Link	Fieldwork date	Sample size	PS	PSD CDS	IL	CDU	BE	CH	O	Lead
2025 local election	12 Oct 2025	—N/a	39.2; 3	44.0; 4	2.3; 0	2.2; 0	2.1; 0	7.7; 0	2.5	4.8
IPOM	2–4 Oct 2025	451	39.6	41.3	1.8	3.5	2.9	10.6	0.3	1.7
Intercampus (Note: Results presented here exclude Undecideds: 6.2%. With their inclusion results are: PSD/CDS: 37.6%; PS: 30.1%; CH: 14.9%; BE: 4.0%; CDU: 2.8%; IL: 2.5%; Others/Invalid: 1.9%.)	19–30 Sep 2025	405	32.1	40.1	2.7	3.0	4.3	15.9	2.0	8.0
2021 local election	26 Sep 2021	—N/a	51.6; 4	32.1; 3		4.6; 0	3.9; 0	2.8; 0	5.1; 0	19.5

=== Setúbal ===
Exit poll

Polling firm/Link	Fieldwork date	Sample size	CDU	PS	Ind. (MDM)		CH	BE	IL	PAN	L	ADN	O	Lead
2025 local election	12 Oct 2025	—N/a	11.4; 1	27.5; 4	29.9; 4		18.1; 2	1.2; 0	4.5; 0	0.9; 0	2.6; 0	1.3; 0	2.6	2.4
CESOP–UCP	12 Oct 2025	4,215	10–13; 1	27–31; 3/5	29–34; 3/5		16–21; 1/3	1–2; 0	3–5; 0	1; 0	1–2; 0	1; 0	1–3	2–3
ICS/ISCTE/Pitagórica	12 Oct 2025	4,419	9.2–12.6; 1/2	25.8–30.6; 3/5	27.4–32.2; 3/5		16.2–20.2; 1/3	0.3–2.3; 0/1	3.2–6.2; 0/1	0.3–1.3; 0/1	0.3–2.3; 0/1			1.6
Pitagórica	9–14 Sep 2025	500	15.0	22.5	30.1		21.6	1.2	3.7	0.2	1.0	0.2	4.5	7.6
2021 local election	26 Sep 2021	—N/a	34.4; 5	27.7; 4	16.6; 2	1.7; 0 (Note: CDS – People's Party result in 2021.)	5.9; 0	4.2; 0	2.3; 0	2.3; 0	—N/a	—N/a	4.9; 0	6.7

=== Sintra ===
Exit poll

Polling firm/Link	Fieldwork date	Sample size	PS L	PSD/IL/PAN			CDS PPM ADN	CH	CDU	BE	ND	O	Lead
Polling firm/Link	Fieldwork date	Sample size	PS L	PAN	IL	PSD	CDS PPM ADN	CH	CDU	BE	ND	O	Lead
2025 local election	12 Oct 2025	—N/a	31.7; 4	33.9; 4			2.1; 0	23.4; 3	4.6; 0	1.6; 0	0.5; 0	2.2	2.2
CESOP–UCP	12 Oct 2025	4,134	32–36; 4/5	33–37; 4/5			1–2; 0	19–22; 2/3	4–6; 0	1–2; 0	0–1; 0	2–4	1
ICS/ISCTE/Pitagórica	12 Oct 2025	5,679	30.4–35.4; 3/5	32.1–37.3; 3/5			1.1–3.1; 0/1	19.4–23.6; 2/4	3.6–6.6; 0/1	1.0–3.0; 0			1.7
Intercampus	12 Oct 2025	5,653	30.4–34.4; 3/5	33.8–37.8; 4/6			0.0–3.7; 0/1	19.3–23.3; 1/3	3.2–7.2; 0/1	0.0–4.0; 0/1		0.0–3.6	3.4
Aximage	17–23 Sep 2025	508	35.0	31.9			1.1	21.9	6.8	1.1	—N/a	2.2	3.1
Pitagórica	13–18 Sep 2025	500	30.3	32.1			1.6	24.5	5.5	2.1	0.3	3.6	1.8
ICS/ISCTE	3–14 Sep 2025	803	32	30			2	28	3	1	1	3	2
Aximage	11–22 Jul 2025	502	39.5	2.2	38.2		0.3	11.3	2.3	2.9	—N/a	3.3	1.3
2021 local election	26 Sep 2021	—N/a	35.3; 5	3.3; 0	2.7; 0	27.5; 4		9.1; 1	9.0; 1	5.8; 0	—N/a	7.3; 0	7.8

=== Torres Novas ===
Polling firm/Link	Fieldwork date	Sample size	PS	PSD CDS	Ind. (MPNT)	BE	CDU	CH	O	Lead
2025 local election	12 Oct 2025	—N/a	34.6; 3	34.2; 3	4.7; 0	4.6; 0	4.8; 0	13.5; 1	3.6	0.4
Intercampus (Note: Results presented here exclude undecideds (25.0%). With their inclusion results are: PS: 47.1%; PSD/CDS: 8.1%; CH: 8.1%; CDU: 2.3%; MPNT: 3.2%; BE: 2.6%; CDU: 1.6%; Others/Invalid: 4.2%.)	18–28 Nov 2024	411	62.8	10.8	4.3	3.5	2.1	10.8	5.6	52.0
2021 local election	26 Sep 2021	—N/a	45.3; 5	16.9; 1	16.6; 1	6.9; 0	6.0; 0	3.1; 0	4.0	28.4

=== Vila Nova de Gaia ===
Exit poll

Polling firm/Link	Fieldwork date	Sample size	PS	PSD CDS IL		CDU	BE L		CH	O	Lead
2025 local election	12 Oct 2025	—N/a	35.9; 5	40.7; 5		3.8; 0	3.2; 0		11.0; 1	5.4; 0	4.8
CESOP–UCP	12 Oct 2025	5,872	37–41; 4/6	39–43; 4/6		4–6; 0	2–4; 0		8–12; 0/1	1–5	2
ICS/ISCTE/Pitagórica	12 Oct 2025	5,178	30.6–35.6; 3/5	40.6–46.0; 5/7		2.5–5.3; 0/1	2.3–5.1; 0/1		9.5–12.9; 1/2		10.0– 10.4
Intercampus	12 Oct 2025	5,490	31.5–35.5; 3/5	40.4–46.4; 5/7		2.7–6.7; 0/1	2.3–6.3; 0/1		7.1–11.1; 0/2	2.0–6.0	8.9– 10.9
Pitagórica	1–7 Sep 2025	500	33.4	41.6		4.1	2.3		12.9	5.7	8.2
2021 local election	26 Sep 2021	—N/a	57.8; 9	17.6; 2 (Note: PSD/CDS/PPM coalition result in 2021.)	2.9; 0	4.8; 0	4.6; 0	0.5; 0	4.2; 0	7.6; 0	40.2
