= Opinion polling for the 2021 Portuguese local elections =

In the run up to the 2021 Portuguese local elections, various organisations carried out opinion polling to gauge voting intention in several municipalities across Portugal. Results of such polls are displayed in this article. The date range for these opinion polls are from the previous local elections, held on 1 October 2017, to the day the next elections were held, on 26 September 2021.

== Polling ==
=== Alcobaça ===
Polling firm/Link	Fieldwork date	Sample size	PSD	PS	CDS	CDU	IL	CH	NC	O	Lead
2021 local election	26 Sep 2021	—	43.2; 4	30.0; 3	5.1; 0	3.5; 0	3.4; 0	4.6; 0	4.4; 0	5.8; 0	13.2
IPOM	29–31 Jul 2021	500	43.8	31.5	1.1	3.4	—	1.1	15.7	3.4	12.3
2017 local election	1 Oct 2017	—	44.0; 4	21.6; 2	15.3; 1	7.6; 0	—	—	—	12.2; 0	22.4

=== Alijó ===
Polling firm/Link	Fieldwork date	Sample size	PSD CDS	PS	BE	CDU	CH	O	Lead
2021 local election	26 Sep 2021	—	60.0; 5	30.9; 2	—	1.8; 0	1.9; 0	5.5	29.1
Multidados	7–17 Sep 2021	290	55.1	35.4	—	2.1	2.6	4.8	19.7
2017 local election	1 Oct 2017	—	44.7; 4	38.5; 3	9.3; 0	2.7; 0	—	4.8	6.2

=== Almada ===
Exit poll

Polling firm/Link	Fieldwork date	Sample size	PS	CDU	PSD CDS PPM MPT A	BE	PAN	IL	CH	O	Lead
2021 local election	26 Sep 2021	—	39.9; 5	29.7; 4	10.7; 1	6.8; 1	2.3; 0	2.0; 0	5.6; 0	3.0	10.2
CESOP–UCP	26 Sep 2021	3,680	40–45; 5/7	30–34; 4/5	8–12; 1	5–8; 0/1	1–2; 0	1–3; 0	3–5; 0	1–3	10– 11
ICS/ISCTE	26 Sep 2021	5,317	38.3– 42.3; 4/6	28.3– 32.3; 3/5	9.0– 12.0; 1/2	5.4– 8.4; 0/1	–	1.5– 3.5; 0	3.4– 6.4; 0/1	3.1– 6.1; 0	10.0
Intercampus	26 Sep 2021	2,804	36.0– 40.4; 4/6	29.1– 33.5; 3/5	9.1– 12.8; 0/2	5.3– 8.9; 0/2	–	–	–	–	6.9
CESOP–UCP; Seat projection	9–11 Sep 2021	623	33; 4/5	29; 3/5	13; 1/2	9; 0/1	5; 0	2; 0	5; 0	4; 0	4
ICS/ISCTE	25 Jun–10 Jul 2021	605	34	33	11	11	—	3	5	3	1
2017 local election	1 Oct 2017	—	31.5; 4	30.8; 4	16.6; 2 (Note: Sum of the PSD and CDS separate results in 2017.)	9.6; 1	3.9; 0	—	—	7.5; 0	0.7

=== Amadora ===
Exit poll

Polling firm/Link	Fieldwork date	Sample size	PS	PSD CDS A MPT PDR	CDU	BE	PAN	IL	CH	O	Lead
2021 local election	26 Sep 2021	—	43.9; 7	24.6; 3	9.9; 1	5.3; 0	3.1; 0	2.8; 0	5.4; 0	5.0; 0	19.3
CESOP–UCP	26 Sep 2021	1,766	42–46; 6/8	23–27; 3/4	8–11; 1	5–7; 0/1	2–5; 0	1–3; 0	5–7; 0	2–6; 0	19
Intercampus	26 Sep 2021	4,195	42.1– 46.9; 6/8	21.9– 25.9; 2/4	8.1– 11.7; 1	4.6– 7.6; 0/2	–	–	–	–	20.2– 21.0
CESOP–UCP; Seat projection	12–13 Sep 2021	685	43; 5/8	22; 2/3	11; 1/2	5; 0/1	3; 0	4; 0	3; 0	9; 0	21
Aximage	26–31 Aug 2021	452	50	22	7	2	2	—	2	15	28
ICS/ISCTE	23–25 Aug 2021	600	41	30	8	5	2	2	3	9	11
2017 local election	1 Oct 2017	—	48.0; 7	18.1; 2	12.2; 1	6.9; 1	3.2; 0	—	—	11.6; 0	29.9

=== Armamar ===
Polling firm/Link	Fieldwork date	Sample size	PSD	CDS	PS	CDU	PNT	O	Lead
2021 local election	26 Sep 2021	—	56.9; 3	—	—	8.2; 0	29.7; 2	5.2	27.2
Multidados	7–17 Sep 2021	290	66.9	—	—	5.7	18.6	8.8	48.3
2017 local election	1 Oct 2017	—	54.7; 3	20.5; 1	15.0; 1	5.5; 0	—	4.3	34.2

=== Aveiro ===
Polling firm/Link	Fieldwork date	Sample size	PSD CDS PPM	PS PAN	BE	CDU	IL	CH	O/U	Lead
2021 local election	26 Sep 2021	—	51.3; 6	26.0; 3	6.4; 0	3.3; 0	2.3; 0	4.0; 0	6.7; 0	25.3
UA-CIMAD	10–20 Sep 2021	300	45.6	7.0	0.3	—	0.6	1.0	45.5 (Note: Undecided - 36.6%; Others/Invalid - 8.9%.)	38.6
2017 local election	1 Oct 2017	—	48.5; 6	34.3; 3 (Note: Sum of the PS and PAN separate results in 2017.)	6.8; 0	4.0; 0	—	—	6.4	14.2

=== Barcelos ===
Polling firm/Link	Fieldwork date	Sample size	PS	PSD CDS	BE	CDU	MAS	CH	TB	BTF	O	Lead
2021 local election	26 Sep 2021	—	37.2; 5	45.4; 6	2.3; 0	1.7; 0	0.7; 0	3.7; 0	4.5; 0	(Note: Barcelos, Terra de Futuro (BTF) is in a coalition with PSD/CDS for the 2021 election.)	4.6	8.2
Eurosondagem; Seat projection	6–8 Sep 2021	1,037	43.3; 5/6	33.6; 4	1.3; 0	1.1; 0	1.0; 0	2.5; 0	11.1; 0/1		6.1	9.7
2017 local election	1 Oct 2017	—	41.2; 5	32.8; 4	1.8; 0	1.5; 0	1.2; 0	—	—	17.9; 1	3.6	8.4

=== Batalha ===
Polling firm/Link	Fieldwork date	Sample size	PSD	PS	CDS	CDU	IL	CH	BT	O/U	Lead
2021 local election	26 Sep 2021	—	35.5; 3	(Note: PS supports the Independent movement "Batalha para todos" (BT).)	4.8; 0	1.1; 0	3.1; 0	4.7; 0	46.5; 4	4.3	11.0
Multidados	30 Aug–7 Sep 2021	500	46.4		2.6	—	1.0	2.6	22.2	25.2	24.2
Intercampus	5–12 Aug 2021	407	35.6		2.2	2.4	1.3	3.0	44.6	10.7	8.9
IPOM	13–15 Jun 2021	456	47.0		1.7	—	0.9	5.1	43.6	1.7	3.4
Multidados (Note: Survey where voters were first asked which party or coalition they would vote for and secondly, which candidate they would cast their ballot for.)	15–23 Apr 2021	500	18.4		—	0.4	0.4	1.6	7.2	72.0	11.2
Multidados	15–23 Apr 2021	500	35.2		1.6	—	—	—	15.6	47.6	19.6
2017 local election	1 Oct 2017	—	53.8; 5	20.0; 1	12.0; 1	3.6; 0	—	—	—	10.6	33.8

=== Braga ===
Polling firm/Link	Fieldwork date	Sample size	PSD CDS PPM A	PS	CDU	BE	PAN	L	IL	CH	O	Lead
2021 local election	26 Sep 2021	—	42.9; 6	30.7; 4	6.7; 1	4.2; 0	2.7; 0	0.6; 0	2.9; 0	4.7; 0	4.6	12.2
IPOM; Seat projection	13–16 Sep 2021	796	55.5; 8	23.3; 3	5.1; 0	5.3; 0	1.6; 0	0.4; 0	0.8; 0	2.7; 0	5.3; 0	32.2
Domp	Jan 2021 (Note: Internal PS poll conducted by the party's national leadership that was leaked by the local press.)	?	52.9	27.7	9.7	5.2	—	—	—	—	4.6	25.2
2017 local election	1 Oct 2017	—	52.1; 7	27.9; 3	9.6; 1	4.8; 0	—	—	—	—	5.6; 0	24.2

=== Cabeceiras de Basto ===
Polling firm/Link	Fieldwork date	Sample size	PS	IPC	CDU	PSD CDS	CH	O	Lead
2021 local election	26 Sep 2021	—	42.7; 3	26.6; 2	0.7; 0	27.3; 2	0.8; 0	2.5	15.4
Intercampus	7–12 Sep 2021	400	49.5	16.9	1.2	25.4	1.8	5.1	24.1
2017 local election	1 Oct 2017	—	50.4; 4	45.6; 3	1.0; 0	—	—	3.0	4.8

=== Carrazeda de Ansiães ===
Polling firm/Link	Fieldwork date	Sample size	PSD	PS	CDU	U.C.	O	Lead
2021 local election	26 Sep 2021	—	59.7; 4	5.3; 0	1.2; 0	28.5; 1	5.3	31.2
Multidados	7–17 Sep 2021	280	51.6	33.3	3.3	8.6	3.2	18.3
2017 local election	1 Oct 2017	—	48.4; 3	44.3; 2	2.7; 0	—	4.6	4.1

=== Coimbra ===
Exit poll

Polling firm/Link	Fieldwork date	Sample size	PS	PSD CDS PPM Volt RIR A NC	CDU	CpC	PAN	IL	CH	SC	O	Lead
2021 local election	26 Sep 2021	—	32.7; 4	43.9; 6	7.5; 1	6.3; 0	1.5; 0	1.7; 0	2.3; 0	(Note: Somos Coimbra (SC) is in a coalition with PSD/CDS/PPM/Volt/RIR/A/NC for the 2021 election.)	4.1; 0	11.2
CESOP–UCP	26 Sep 2021	3,706	27–31; 4/5	42–47; 5/7	5–7; 0	8–11; 1	1–2; 0	1–3; 0	1–3; 0		2–6; 0	15– 16
ICS/ISCTE	26 Sep 2021	5,690	28.9– 32.9; 3/5	43.6– 47.6; 5/7	6.2– 9.2; 1/2	5.2– 8.2; 0/1	–	1.0– 3.0; 0	1.3– 3.3; 0		3.3– 6.3; 0	14.7
Intercampus	26 Sep 2021	3,653	28.2– 32.6; 3/5	42.6– 47.4; 5/7	5.8– 9.4; 0/1	5.6– 9.2; 0/1	–	–	–		–	14.4– 14.8
CESOP–UCP; Seat projection	18–19 Sep 2021	780	33; 4/5	35; 4/5	7; 0/1	11; 1	2; 0	3; 0	4; 0		5; 0	2
ICS/ISCTE	31 Aug–2 Sep 2021	606	33	32	7	12	—	3	3		11	1
Aximage	26–30 Aug 2021	401	41	21	5	4	1	2	2		24	20
2017 local election	1 Oct 2017	—	35.5; 5	26.6; 3	8.3; 1	7.0; 0	1.6; 0	—	—	16.1; 2	4.9; 0	8.9

=== Elvas ===
Polling firm/Link	Fieldwork date	Sample size	PS	MCE	PSD CDS	CDU	BE	CH	O	Lead
2021 local election	26 Sep 2021	—	31.2; 3	37.9; 3	13.9; 1	3.9; 0	—	9.8; 0	3.5	6.7
Eurosondagem; Seat projection	20–23 Jul 2021	1,000	51.0; 4	22.2; 3	8.5; 0	3.3; 0	—	6.6; 0	8.4; 0	28.8
2017 local election	1 Oct 2017	—	48.9; 4	29.4; 3	13.2; 0	3.0; 0	1.3; 0	—	4.1	19.5

=== Figueira da Foz ===
Exit poll

Polling firm/Link	Fieldwork date	Sample size	PS	PSD	CDU	BE	CDS	PAN	CH	PSL	O	Lead
2021 local election	26 Sep 2021	—	38.4; 4	10.8; 1	2.7; 0	2.5; 0	1.2; 0	—	—	40.4; 4	4.5	2.0
CESOP–UCP	26 Sep 2021	2,695	33–37; 3/4	8–11; 0/1	2–4; 0	1–3; 0	1–2; 0	–	–	41–46; 4/5	3–5	8–9
Intercampus	26 Sep 2021	4,195	36.1– 40.5; 3/5	8.6– 12.2; 0/2	0.9– 3.4; 0/1	–	–	–	–	39.7– 44.5; 3/5	–	3.6– 4.0
ICS/ISCTE	26–30 Aug 2021	604	35	8	3	—	—	—	1	47	6	12
Eurosondagem; Seat projection	1–2 Aug 2021	1,048	34.3; 4	8.6; 0	1.3; 0	3.8; 0	1.5; 0	—	2.8; 0	38.0; 5	9.7; 0	3.7
2017 local election	1 Oct 2017	—	50.1; 6	28.5; 3	6.5; 0	4.3; 0	1.8; 0	—	—	—	8.8; 0	21.6

=== Freixo de Espada à Cinta ===
Polling firm/Link	Fieldwork date	Sample size	PSD	PS	CDS	CDU	O	Lead
2021 local election	26 Sep 2021	—	32.6; 2	63.0; 3	—	1.0; 0	4.6	30.4
Multidados	7–17 Sep 2021	280	39.9	43.3	—	2.8	14.0	3.4
2017 local election	1 Oct 2017	—	49.3; 3	34.8; 2	10.0; 0	1.3; 0	4.6	14.5

=== Funchal ===
Polling firm/Link	Fieldwork date	Sample size	PS BE PAN MPT PDR	PSD CDS	CDU	IND	PTP	JPP	IL	CH	O	Lead
2021 local election	26 Sep 2021	—	39.7; 5	47.0; 6	2.9; 0	—	1.1; 0	1.7; 0	1.3; 0	2.6; 0	3.7; 0	7.3
Eurosondagem; Seat projection	18–20 Sep 2021	1,073	42.5; 5/6	40.9; 5/6	2.2; 0	—	0.3; 0	3.2; 0	2.6; 0	3.0; 0	5.3; 0	1.6
Intercampus; Seat projection	3–20 Sep 2021	1,200	36.3; 5	47.2; 6	2.6; 0	—	3.6; 0	1.9; 0	1.8; 0	2.8; 0	3.8; 0	10.9
Aximage	13–17 Aug 2021	380	35.3	55.5	0.6	—	2.7	0.6	—	4.4	0.9	20.2
Eurosondagem; Seat projection	18–20 Jul 2021	1,525	42.8; 6	38.8; 5	2.2; 0	—	1.6; 0	3.6; 0	2.1; 0	4.2; 0	4.7; 0	4.0
Intercampus	17–26 May 2021	402	38.3	46.7	2.6	—	1.1	1.5	2.2	2.9	4.7	8.4
Eurosondagem; Seat projection	22–23 Mar 2021	1,520	42.0; 5/6	42.0; 5/6	1.1; 0	—	1.0; 0	2.0; 0	2.5; 0	4.2; 0	5.2; 0	Tie
Intercampus	19–28 Feb 2021	406	37.9	49.1	2.4	1.0	0.7	1.0	2.1	3.4	2.4	11.2
Aximage	6–10 Feb 2021	600	22.4	60.9	0.3	1.0	0.3	1.3	2.3	3.0	8.5	38.5
Eurosondagem; Seat projection	14–19 Jan 2021	1,220	44.1; 6	42.5; 5	2.1; 0	—	1.0; 0	1.1; 0	—	2.2; 0	7.0; 0	1.6
2017 local election	1 Oct 2017	—	42.1; 6	40.6; 5	3.6; 0	2.4; 0	2.2; 0	w.PS	—	—	9.1; 0	1.5

Hypothetical polling

Polling firm/Link	Fieldwork date	Sample size	PS BE PAN MPT PDR	PSD CDS	CDU	IND	PTP	JPP	IL	CH	O	Lead
Intercampus	19–28 Feb 2021	406 (Note: If the PSD/CDS candidate is Eduardo Jesus.)	41.5	41.5	3.6	2.2	1.0	1.4	1.8	4.7	2.3	Tie
Intercampus	19–28 Feb 2021	406 (Note: If the PSD/CDS candidate is Manuel António Correia.)	41.7	42.1	2.2	2.6	1.4	1.4	2.6	4.0	2.0	0.4
Aximage	6–10 Feb 2021	600	27.4	49.5	1.0	1.0	0.7	0.7	4.3	4.0	11.4	22.1
Aximage	6–10 Feb 2021	600 (Note: If PSD/CDS candidate is Pedro Ramos)	25.3	46.7	0.3	1.3	0.3	1.7	4.7	4.0	15.7	21.4
Aximage	6–10 Feb 2021	600	30.6	40.5	0.3	0.7	1.0	0.7	4.7	5.0	16.5	9.9

=== Gondomar ===
Polling firm/Link	Fieldwork date	Sample size	PS	CDU	PSD CDS	BE	PAN	IL	CH	O	Lead
2021 local election	26 Sep 2021	—	46.9; 7	10.8; 1	21.6; 3	5.8; 0	2.9; 0	2.7; 0	4.0; 0	5.3	25.3
Multidados; Seat projection	7–17 Sep 2021	1,000	55.6; 7	12.4; 1	21.2; 3	4.7; 0	1.1; 0	1.7; 0	2.5; 0	0.7	34.4
2017 local election	1 Oct 2017	—	45.5; 6	15.4; 2	11.0; 1	3.6; 0	—	—	—	24.5; 2	25.6

=== Guarda ===
Polling firm/Link	Fieldwork date	Sample size	PSD	PS	CDS	BE	CDU	CH	PG	O/U	Lead
2021 local election	26 Sep 2021	—	33.7; 3	18.0; 1	2.7; 0	1.6; 0	1.3; 0	2.7; 0	36.2; 3	3.8	2.5
Eurosondagem; Seat projection	21–23 Jun 2021	1,011	63.8; 5/6	21.2; 1/2	2.2; 0	1.1; 0	—	3.3; 0	3.6; 0	4.8; 0	42.6
Eurosondagem	Jan 2020	1,172	39.2	24.7	2.2	2.1	5.4	—	—	26.4	14.5
2017 local election	1 Oct 2017	—	61.2; 5	23.4; 2	5.6; 0	3.0; 0	2.1; 0	—	—	4.7	37.8

=== Lamego ===
Polling firm/Link	Fieldwork date	Sample size	PS	PSD CDS	CDU	CH	CDS	O	Lead
2021 local election	26 Sep 2021	—	44.0; 3	45.3; 4	2.5; 0	4.1; 0	—	4.1	1.3
Multidados	7–17 Sep 2021	248	33.2	53.8	3.4	4.1	—	5.5	20.6
2017 local election	1 Oct 2017	—	37.9; 3	27.0; 2 (Note: PSD/CDS 2021 coalition compared with the PSD 2017 solo results.)	2.7; 0	—	25.0; 2	7.4; 0	10.9

=== Leiria ===
Polling firm/Link	Fieldwork date	Sample size	PS	PSD	CDS	BE	CDU	CH	O	Lead
2021 local election	26 Sep 2021	—	52.5; 8	22.4; 3	4.2; 0	2.4; 0	2.5; 0	5.7; 0	10.3; 0	30.1
IPOM	9–12 Jul 2021	600	58.7	19.3	0.7	2.7	4.0	10.0	4.7	39.4
2017 local election	1 Oct 2017	—	54.5; 8	27.0; 3	5.0; 0	2.7; 0	2.4; 0	—	8.4; 0	27.5

=== Lisbon ===
Exit poll

Polling firm/Link	Fieldwork date	Sample size	PS L	PSD CDS PPM MPT A	CDU	BE	PAN	IL	CH	O	Lead
2021 local election	26 Sep 2021	—	33.3; 7	34.3; 7	10.5; 2	6.2; 1	2.7; 0	4.2; 0	4.4; 0	4.4; 0	1.0
CESOP–UCP	26 Sep 2021	4,146	31–35; 6/8	32–36; 6/8	10–13; 1/2	5–7; 1	2–4; 0	3–5; 0/1	3–5; 0/1	2–9; 0	1
ICS/ISCTE	26 Sep 2021	8,159	31.3– 36.3; 6/8	30.2– 35.2; 6/8	10.4– 13.4; 2/3	5.7– 8.7; 1/2	1.8– 3.8; 0	3.2– 6.2; 0/1	2.4– 5.4; 0/1	1.6– 4.6; 0	1.1
Pitagórica	26 Sep 2021	6,206	32.6– 38.6; 7	29.3– 35.3; 6/7	6.6– 12.6; 2	4.2– 8.2; 1	1.0– 5.0; 0	3.3– 7.3; 0/1	1.9– 5.9; 0	2.1– 6.1; 0	3.3– 3.7
Intercampus	26 Sep 2021	6,406	32.0– 36.4; 6/8	31.2– 35.6; 6/8	10.1– 13.7; 1/3	5.5– 8.5; 0/2	1.6– 4.6; 0/1	2.9– 5.9; 0/1	1.6– 4.6; 0/1	2.5– 3.3; 0	0.8
Pitagórica; Seat projection	15–21 Sep 2021	600	40.6; 8/9	33.1; 6/7	7.6; 1	4.7; 0/1	3.2; 0	3.2; 0	2.1; 0	5.5; 0	7.5
CESOP–UCP; Seat projection	16–20 Sep 2021	1,292	37; 7/8	28; 5/6	11; 1/2	7; 1	3; 0	5; 0/1	3; 0	6; 0	9
Pitagórica; Seat projection	30 Aug–4 Sep 2021	600	39.8; 8/9	32.6; 6/7	8.5; 1	6.8; 1	3.8; 0	3.0; 0	2.8; 0	2.7; 0	7.2
Intercampus; Seat projection	25–30 Aug 2021	642	45.2; 9	27.0; 5	9.7; 2	8.5; 1	1.8; 0	2.1; 0	3.2; 0	2.5; 0	18.2
Eurosondagem; Seat projection	23–26 Aug 2021	2,225	38.6; 8	26.9; 4	7.7; 0/2	6.3; 0/2	3.3; 0/1	6.3; 0/2	4.8; 0/2	6.1; 0	11.7
Aximage	14–21 Aug 2021	792	51	27	9	4	2	2	2	3	24
ICS/ISCTE	3–18 Jul 2021	803	42	31	6	8	3	2	4	4	11
Intercampus	8–13 Apr 2021	611	46.6	25.7	7.1	6.6	0.5	2.3	6.1	5.1	20.9
2017 local election	1 Oct 2017	—	42.0; 8	31.8; 6	9.6; 2	7.1; 1	3.0; 0	—	—	6.5	10.2

=== Loures ===
Polling firm/Link	Fieldwork date	Sample size	CDU	PS	PSD	BE	CDS	PAN	IL	CH	O	Lead
2021 local election	26 Sep 2021	—	29.0; 4	31.5; 4	14.0; 2	3.9; 0	1.5; 0	2.2; 0	3.3; 0	8.4; 1	6.2; 0	2.5
Eurosondagem; Seat projection	8–11 Sep 2021	1,511	29.8; 4	31.6; 4	18.5; 3	2.6; 0	2.1; 0	2.2; 0	—	4.3; 0	8.9; 0	1.8
2017 local election	1 Oct 2017	—	32.8; 4	28.2; 4	21.6; 3	3.5; 0	2.9; 0	2.1; 0	—	—	8.9; 0	4.6

=== Marinha Grande ===
Polling firm/Link	Fieldwork date	Sample size	PS	CDU	MPM	PSD	BE	CDS	CH	O	Lead
2021 local election	26 Sep 2021	—	21.9; 2	20.5; 2	38.3; 3	6.9; 0	3.7; 0	0.8; 0	3.4; 0	4.5	16.4
IPOM	22–23 Jul 2021	468	33.3	15.7	30.6	4.6	9.3	—	3.7	2.8	2.7
2017 local election	1 Oct 2017	—	29.4; 3	24.5; 2	22.1; 2	4.9; 0	4.8; 0	0.8; 0	—	13.5; 0	4.9

=== Matosinhos ===
Polling firm/Link	Fieldwork date	Sample size	PS	SIM	PSD CDS	CDU	BE	PAN	CH	MI	O	Lead
2021 local election	26 Sep 2021	—	43.6; 7	9.9; 1	17.3; 2	6.6; 1	5.7; 0	2.7; 0	3.8; 0	0.9; 0	9.5; 0	26.3
Intercampus	28 Jun–20 Jul 2021	601	42.8	7.0	11.3	4.3	6.5	1.1	5.8	0.7	20.5 (Note: Candidates that appear in the poll but are not running: Pedro Sousa - 7.9%; Narciso Miranda - 4.5% (16.2% and 2 councillors in 2017); Others/Invalid - 8.1%.)	31.5
2017 local election	1 Oct 2017	—	36.3; 5	15.2; 2	11.9; 1	6.7; 1	4.6; 0	3.2; 0	—	—	22.2; 2	20.1

=== Mesão Frio ===
Polling firm/Link	Fieldwork date	Sample size	PS	PSD CDS	CDU	MMMF	O	Lead
2021 local election	26 Sep 2021	—	48.6; 3	14.2; 0	1.2; 0	32.6; 2	3.5	16.0
Multidados	7–17 Sep 2021	280	40.1	20.4	2.2	37.3	—	2.8
2017 local election	1 Oct 2017	—	61.6; 4	21.3; 1	0.9; 0	—	3.4	40.3

=== Moimenta da Beira ===
Polling firm/Link	Fieldwork date	Sample size	PS	PSD CDS	CDU	CH	O	Lead
2021 local election	26 Sep 2021	—	54.6; 4	37.8; 3	1.2; 0	2.3; 0	4.1	16.8
Multidados	7–17 Sep 2021	280	41.7	25.2	6.5	12.9	13.7	16.5
2017 local election	1 Oct 2017	—	52.5; 4	34.7; 3	1.5; 0	—	11.3; 0	17.8

=== Montijo ===
Polling firm/Link	Fieldwork date	Sample size	PS	CDU	PSD CDS A	BE	PAN	IL	CH	O	Lead
2021 local election	26 Sep 2021	—	29.5; 3	19.4; 2	27.7; 2	4.1; 0	3.2; 0	4.4; 0	6.6; 0	5.1; 0	1.8
Eurosondagem; Seat projection	23–25 Aug 2021	720	44.9; 4	18.5; 1/2	17.2; 1/2	4.3; 0	2.5; 0	2.9; 0	4.1; 0	5.6; 0	26.4
2017 local election	1 Oct 2017	—	45.4; 4	20.1; 2	19.4; 1	5.1; 0	2.4; 0	—	—	7.5; 0	25.3

=== Murça ===
Polling firm/Link	Fieldwork date	Sample size	PSD	PS	CDS	CDU	O	Lead
2021 local election	26 Sep 2021	—	57.0; 3	33.7; 2	4.0; 0	0.8; 0	4.5	23.3
Multidados	7–17 Sep 2021	270	58.7	26.4	5.3	9.6	0.0	32.3
2017 local election	1 Oct 2017	—	47.8; 3	45.0; 2	2.8; 0	1.1; 0	3.3	2.8

=== Nazaré ===
Polling firm/Link	Fieldwork date	Sample size	PS	PSD	CDU	BE	CDS	O	Lead
2021 local election	26 Sep 2021	—	44.9; 4	28.2; 2	14.3; 1	5.1; 0	1.6; 0	5.9	16.7
IPOM	29–30 Jul 2021	452	60.7	19.0	10.7	1.2	—	8.4	41.7
2017 local election	1 Oct 2017	—	56.6; 5	25.2; 2	7.1; 0	3.6; 0	2.5; 0	5.0	31.4

=== Ourém ===
Polling firm/Link	Fieldwork date	Sample size	PSD CDS	PS	MOVE	CDU	CH	O	Lead
2021 local election	26 Sep 2021	—	62.8; 6	18.8; 1	6.0; 0	2.2; 0	4.9; 0	5.3	44.0
IPOM	5–6 Aug 2021	528	55.5	25.2	6.5	2.6	3.9	6.5	30.3
2017 local election	1 Oct 2017	—	47.2; 4	34.4; 3	9.3; 0	3.3; 0	—	5.8	12.8

=== Palmela ===
Polling firm/Link	Fieldwork date	Sample size	CDU	PS	PSD	MIM	BE	PAN	CH	MCCP	O	Lead
2021 local election	26 Sep 2021	—	31.4; 4	23.8; 3	8.7; 1	2.7; 0	4.3; 0	—	7.8; 0	14.3; 1	7.0; 0	7.6
Eurosondagem; Seat projection	16–18 Jun 2021	1,008	45.9; 5/6	22.5; 2/3	9.6; 1	1.1; 0	4.2; 0	2.1; 0	2.5; 0	7.3; 0	4.8; 0	23.4
2017 local election	1 Oct 2017	—	40.7; 4	28.3; 3	11.7; 1 (Note: PSD and CDS ran in a coalition in 2017. CDS is supporting MIM in 2021.)	8.2; 1	6.0; 0	—	—	—	5.1	12.4

=== Paços de Ferreira ===
Polling firm/Link	Fieldwork date	Sample size	PS	PSD	CDU	CDS	CH	O	Lead
2021 local election	26 Sep 2021	—	55.8; 4	33.9; 3	3.2; 0	1.6; 0	2.2; 0	3.3	21.9
Eurosondagem; Seat projection	2–4 Sep 2021	710	64.9; 5	25.9; 2	1.0; 0	0.7; 0	4.2; 0	3.3; 0	39.0
Aximage	16–29 Apr 2021	700	66.0	25.0	4.0	—	4.0	1.0	41.0
2017 local election	1 Oct 2017	—	64.8; 5	29.0; 2	1.3; 0	1.1; 0	—	3.8; 0	35.8

=== Penafiel ===
Polling firm/Link	Fieldwork date	Sample size	PSD CDS	PS RIR	CDU	BE	CH	O	Lead
2021 local election	26 Sep 2021	—	60.5; 6	30.9; 3	1.9; 0	1.7; 0	2.2; 0	2.8	29.6
Eurosondagem; Seat projection	3–5 Sep 2021	1,037	50.8; 5	35.3; 4	1.2; 0	1.1; 0	4.8; 0	6.8; 0	15.5
2017 local election	1 Oct 2017	—	51.9; 5	34.8; 4	1.5; 0	1.1; 0	—	10.7; 0	17.1

=== Penedono ===
Polling firm/Link	Fieldwork date	Sample size	PSD	PS	CDU	MP	O	Lead
2021 local election	26 Sep 2021	—	48.3; 3	33.3; 2	0.8; 0	13.9; 0	3.7	15.0
Multidados	7–17 Sep 2021	260	43.2	29.2	2.0	25.6	0.0	14.0
2017 local election	1 Oct 2017	—	55.2; 3	36.2; 2	1.6; 0	—	7.0	19.0

=== Peso da Régua ===
Polling firm/Link	Fieldwork date	Sample size	PSD	PS	CDU	BE	CDS	CH	O	Lead
2021 local election	26 Sep 2021	—	53.7; 4	36.8; 3	1.6; 0	2.2; 0	0.6; 0	1.9; 0	3.2	16.9
Multidados	7–17 Sep 2021	290	46.3	22.4	2.6	1.1	4.8	6.9	15.9	23.9
2017 local election	1 Oct 2017	—	55.1; 4	38.9; 3	2.5; 0	—	—	—	3.4	16.2

=== Pombal ===
Polling firm/Link	Fieldwork date	Sample size	PSD	PS	CDS	BE	CDU	IL	CH	IND	O	Lead
2021 local election	26 Sep 2021	—	61.1; 5	21.0; 2	—	2.9; 0	1.8; 0	3.2; 0	3.7; 0	—	6.3	40.1
IPOM	26–27 Jul 2021	568	58.6	29.7	—	0.9	—	5.4	2.7	—	2.7	28.9
2017 local election	1 Oct 2017	—	46.3; 5	11.7; 1	6.4; 0	2.3; 0	1.2; 0	—	—	24.4; 3	7.7; 0	21.9

=== Ponta do Sol ===
Polling firm/Link	Fieldwork date	Sample size	PS	PSD CDS	CDU	PTP	JPP	IL	O	Lead
2021 local election	26 Sep 2021	—	54.0; 3	37.7; 2	0.9; 0	0.7; 0	3.3; 0	1.1; 0	2.3	16.3
Eurosondagem; Seat projection	23–24 Aug 2021	711	48.8; 2/3	40.5; 2/3	0.8; 0	0.9; 0	2.8; 0	2.0; 0	4.2; 0	8.3
Intercampus	6–17 Aug 2021	401	43.6	44.2	2.0	1.7	2.6	1.2	4.7	0.6
2017 local election	1 Oct 2017	—	40.3; 2 (Note: In 2017, PS won Ponta do Sol with 40.3% against the 38.7% of the PSD. CDS ran alone and achieved 14.2% of the votes. In 2021, PSD and CDS are running in a joint coalition, therefore, in the table is displayed the sum of votes of PSD+CDS, but with the PS highlighted as the winner in 2017.)	52.9; 3 (Note: PSD: 38.7%+CDS: 14.2%)	0.8; 0	0.6; 0	—	—	5.4	1.6

=== Porto ===
Exit poll

Polling firm/Link	Fieldwork date	Sample size	RM	PS	PSD	CDU	BE	PAN	L	CH	O	Lead
2021 local election	26 Sep 2021	—	40.7; 6	18.0; 3	17.2; 2	7.5; 1	6.3; 1	2.8; 0	0.5; 0	3.0; 0	4.0; 0	22.7
CESOP–UCP	26 Sep 2021	3,957	39–44; 6/8	16–19; 2/3	16–19; 2/3	6–9; 1	5–8; 0/1	2–4; 0	0–1; 0	2–4; 0	2–7; 0	23– 25
ICS/ISCTE	26 Sep 2021	6,309	39.2– 44.2; 5/7	16.5– 20.5; 2/4	15.1– 19.1; 1/3	5.6– 8.6; 1/2	4.9– 7.9; 1/2	2.0– 4.0; 0	–	1.5– 3.5; 0	2.3– 5.3; 0	22.7– 23.7
Pitagórica	26 Sep 2021	5,390	39.2– 45.2; 6/7	13.7– 19.7; 2/3	12.2– 18.2; 2	6.5– 10.5; 1	5.3– 9.3; 0/1	1.2– 5.2; 0	–	0.8– 4.8; 0	2.1– 6.1; 0	25.5
Intercampus	26 Sep 2021	4,106	40.1– 44.9; 6/8	15.5– 19.5; 1/3	14.9– 18.9; 1/3	5.4– 9.0; 0/2	5.1– 8.1; 0/2	1.24– 4.4; 0	–	1.0– 4.0; 0	3.5– 4.4; 0	24.6– 25.4
Pitagórica; Seat projection	15–20 Sep 2021	600	52.7; 8/9	15.3; 2	11.5; 1/2	6.1; 0/1	4.1; 0	2.9; 0	0.7; 0	2.7; 0	4.0; 0	37.4
CESOP–UCP; Seat projection	16–19 Sep 2021	1,041	45; 7/8	17; 2/3	14; 1/3	7; 1	4; 0	3; 0	1; 0	3; 0	6; 0	28
Pitagórica	2–5 Sep 2021	601	52.8	15.7	14.0	5.8	3.5	2.2	—	1.8	4.2	37.1
Aximage	12–19 Aug 2021	820	59	12	12	6	4	2	—	1	4	47
ICS/ISCTE	26 Jun–10 Jul 2021	800	45	25	8	8	5	2	1	1	5	20
2017 local election	1 Oct 2017	—	44.5; 7	28.6; 4	10.4; 1	5.9; 1	5.3; 0	1.9; 0	—	—	3.4; 0	15.9

=== Porto de Mós ===
Polling firm/Link	Fieldwork date	Sample size	PSD	PS	CDU	CH	IND	O	Lead
2021 local election	26 Sep 2021	—	55.9; 4	35.9; 3	1.7; 0	3.0; 0	—	3.5	20.0
IPOM	17–19 Jun 2021	494	41.7	45.6	1.9	1.9	—	8.9	3.9
2017 local election	1 Oct 2017	—	37.0; 3	30.3; 2	2.7; 0	—	24.4; 2	5.7	6.7

=== Porto Santo ===
Polling firm/Link	Fieldwork date	Sample size	PSD CDS	PS	CDU	BE	JPP	PPM	IL	CH	UNE	O	Lead
2021 local election	26 Sep 2021	—	50.9; 3	30.2; 1	0.6; 0	—	—	0.7; 0	—	—	15.2; 1	2.4	20.7
Eurosondagem; Seat projection	12–13 Sep 2021	318	42.0; 2/3	44.2; 2/3	1.9; 0	—	—	1.9; 0	—	—	5.2; 0	4.8; 0	2.2
Intercampus	15–23 Apr 2021	404	31.9	30.1	0.7	1.4	2.8	2.1	0.4	1.1	20.6	8.9	1.8
2017 local election	1 Oct 2017	—	41.6; 2	37.0; 2	2.8; 0	1.5; 0	—	—	—	—	—	17.0; 1	4.6

=== Póvoa de Lanhoso ===
Polling firm/Link	Fieldwork date	Sample size	PSD	PS	CDU	CDS	BE	NC	CH	O	Lead
2021 local election	26 Sep 2021	—	46.3; 3	47.9; 4	0.5; 0	1.2; 0	0.6; 0	0.2; 0	0.8; 0	2.5	1.6
IPOM	10–13 Sep 2021	592	53.5	39.1	1.5	2.1	2.1	0.3	0.8	0.8	14.4
2017 local election	1 Oct 2017	—	43.5; 4	42.5; 3	0.9; 0	—	—	—	—	13.1; 0	1.0

=== Sabrosa ===
Polling firm/Link	Fieldwork date	Sample size	PS	PSD	CDU	CDS	CH	JÁ!	JF	O	Lead
2021 local election	26 Sep 2021	—	28.9; 2	27.3; 1	1.4; 0	7.9; 0	1.0; 0	27.3; 2	3.0; 0	3.3	1.6
Multidados	7–17 Sep 2021	260	12.0	48.2	2.3	4.1	8.4	18.5	6.5	0.0	29.7
2017 local election	1 Oct 2017	—	53.3; 3	39.8; 2	2.4; 0	—	—	—	—	4.5	13.5

=== Santa Cruz ===
Polling firm/Link	Fieldwork date	Sample size	JPP	PSD CDS	PS	PTP	CDU	IL	CH	O	Lead
2021 local election	26 Sep 2021	—	54.1; 5	28.0; 2	7.6; 0	1.7; 0	1.7; 0	1.0; 0	2.3; 0	3.6; 0	26.1
Eurosondagem; Seat projection	4–6 Sep 2021	718	59.8; 6	18.8; 1	7.3; 0	1.9; 0	1.0; 0	2.5; 0	3.6; 0	5.1; 0	40.0
2017 local election	1 Oct 2017	—	60.0; 6	21.9; 1	6.9; 0	2.5; 0	1.5; 0	—	—	7.2; 0	38.1

=== Santa Marta de Penaguião ===
Polling firm/Link	Fieldwork date	Sample size	PS	PSD CDS	CDU	O	Lead
2021 local election	26 Sep 2021	—	57.3; 3	35.2; 2	2.2; 0	5.3	22.1
Multidados	7–17 Sep 2021	270	62.1	30.9	2.6	4.4	31.2
2017 local election	1 Oct 2017	—	62.6; 3	31.8; 2	2.1; 0	3.5	30.8

=== Santana ===
Polling firm/Link	Fieldwork date	Sample size	CDS	PSD	PS	CDU	O	Lead
2021 local election	26 Sep 2021	—	58.1; 4	27.1; 1	10.7; 0	0.9; 0	3.2; 0	31.0
Eurosondagem; Seat projection	30–31 Aug 2021	525	53.8; 4	26.4; 1	4.2; 0	1.9; 0	13.7; 0	27.4
Intercampus	16–24 Jun 2021	445	63.5	14.7	18.6	1.3	2.0	44.9
2017 local election	1 Oct 2017	—	60.5; 4	22.4; 1	3.6; 0	1.8; 0	11.7; 0	38.1

=== Santarém ===
Polling firm/Link	Fieldwork date	Sample size	PSD	PS	CDU	CDS	BE	IL	CH	O	Lead
2021 local election	26 Sep 2021	—	37.4; 4	33.3; 4	7.2; 0	2.6; 0	4.2; 0	2.1; 0	7.9; 1	5.3; 0	4.1
Pitagórica	24 May–20 Jun 2021	669	46.5	34.9	7.1	—	4.7	1.4	3.1	2.3	11.6
2017 local election	1 Oct 2017	—	43.2; 5	34.1; 4	7.6; 0	5.4; 0	4.1; 0	—	—	5.6; 0	9.1

=== São João da Madeira ===
Polling firm/Link	Fieldwork date	Sample size	PS	PSD CDS IL	CDU	BE	NC	CH	O	Lead
2021 local election	26 Sep 2021	—	51.6; 4	32.1; 3	4.6; 0	3.9; 0	1.1; 0	2.8; 0	4.0	19.5
Intercampus; Seat projection	15–20 Sep 2021	401	51.4; 5	30.6; 2	4.4; 0	4.0; 0	0.7; 0	3.3; 0	5.6; 0	20.8
Eurosondagem; Seat projection	17–19 Sep 2021	725	56.1; 5	28.4; 2	4.7; 0	3.1; 0	2.5; 0	1.9; 0	3.3; 0	27.7
2017 local election	1 Oct 2017	—	55.4; 5	32.2; 2	4.0; 0	2.4; 0	—	—	4.1; 0	23.2

=== São João da Pesqueira ===
Polling firm/Link	Fieldwork date	Sample size	PNT	PSD CDS	CDU	O	Lead
2021 local election	26 Sep 2021	—	58.5; 3	35.2; 2	1.8; 0	4.5	23.3
Multidados	7–17 Sep 2021	260	60.8	36.5	2.7	0.0	24.3
2017 local election	1 Oct 2017	—	54.1; 3	40.3; 2	1.8; 0	3.9	13.8

=== Seixal ===
Polling firm/Link	Fieldwork date	Sample size	CDU	PS	PSD	BE	PAN	CDS PDR A MPT	IL	CH	O	Lead
2021 local election	26 Sep 2021	—	37.7; 5	30.9; 4	9.3; 1	4.3; 0	2.8; 0	1.5; 0	1.8; 0	8.1; 1	3.6	6.8
Eurosondagem; Seat projection	19–22 Aug 2021	1,037	37.3; 5	32.0; 4/5	11.6; 1	7.3; 0/1	—	1.9; 0	2.5; 0	2.1; 0	5.3; 0	5.3
2017 local election	1 Oct 2017	—	36.5; 5	31.4; 4	11.8; 1	7.5; 1	4.1; 0	2.8; 0	—	—	5.8; 0	5.1

=== Sernancelhe ===
Polling firm/Link	Fieldwork date	Sample size	PSD	PS	CDU	O	Lead
2021 local election	26 Sep 2021	—	81.9; 5	9.4; 0	4.0; 0	4.8	72.5
Multidados	7–17 Sep 2021	260	69.7	24.1	2.8	3.4	45.6
2017 local election	1 Oct 2017	—	71.9; 4	18.2; 1	0.5; 0	9.5; 0	53.7

=== Sintra ===
Polling firm/Link	Fieldwork date	Sample size	PS	PSD CDS A MPT PDR PPM RIR	CDU	BE	PAN	NC	IL	CH	O	Lead
2021 local election	26 Sep 2021	—	35.3; 5	27.5; 4	9.0; 1	5.8; 0	3.3; 0	3.0; 0	2.7; 0	9.1; 1	4.4	7.8
Eurosondagem; Seat projection	20–22 Sep 2021	759	43.2; 6	26.9; 4	7.5; 1	4.6; 0	2.9; 0	2.8; 0	4.2; 0	4.3; 0	3.6	16.3
2017 local election	1 Oct 2017	—	43.1; 6	29.0; 4	9.4; 1	6.3; 0	3.7; 0	1.1; 0	—	—	7.5; 0	14.1

=== Tabuaço ===
Polling firm/Link	Fieldwork date	Sample size	PSD CDS	PS	CDU	CH	O	Lead
2021 local election	26 Sep 2021	—	69.9; 4	18.6; 1	0.9; 0	4.4; 0	6.2	51.3
Multidados	7–17 Sep 2021	260	51.2	26.6	—	22.2	0.0	24.6
2017 local election	1 Oct 2017	—	57.7; 3	38.3; 2	0.9; 0	—	3.1	19.4

=== Tarouca ===
Polling firm/Link	Fieldwork date	Sample size	PSD CDS	PS	CDU	MCAT	O	Lead
2021 local election	26 Sep 2021	—	59.7; 3	—	2.6; 0	33.8; 2	3.9	25.9
Multidados	7–17 Sep 2021	270	68.0	—	2.2	29.8	0.0	38.2
2017 local election	1 Oct 2017	—	62.3; 3	30.9; 2	2.3; 0	—	4.6	31.4

=== Torre de Moncorvo ===
Polling firm/Link	Fieldwork date	Sample size	PSD CDS	PS	CDU	O	Lead
2021 local election	26 Sep 2021	—	52.1; 3	42.2; 2	1.1; 0	4.6; 0	9.9
Multidados	7–17 Sep 2021	270	47.7	42.7	2.4	7.2	5.0
2017 local election	1 Oct 2017	—	56.7; 3	36.1; 2	2.0; 0	5.2	20.6

=== Vila Franca de Xira ===
Polling firm/Link	Fieldwork date	Sample size	PS	CDU	PSD CDS MPT PPM	BE	PAN	CH	O	Lead
2021 local election	26 Sep 2021	—	39.6; 5	21.9; 3	14.8; 2	6.0; 0	3.9; 0	8.5; 1	5.2	17.7
Pitagórica; Seat projection	30 Jul–3 Aug 2021	402	36.5; 5	31.2; 4	10.2; 1	7.0; 0/1	3.5; 0	6.3; 0/1	5.3; 0	5.3
2017 local election	1 Oct 2017	—	39.1; 5	30.5; 4	13.6; 1	7.0; 1	3.9; 0	—	5.9; 0	8.6

=== Vila Nova de Famalicão ===
Polling firm/Link	Fieldwork date	Sample size	PSD CDS	PS	CDU	BE	PAN	IL	CH	O	Lead
2021 local election	26 Sep 2021	—	52.9; 7	32.2; 4	2.4; 0	1.9; 0	1.6; 0	2.3; 0	2.8; 0	3.9	20.7
Eurosondagem; Seat projection	16–18 Sep 2021	1,035	41.8; 5/6	42.8; 5/6	2.2; 0	1.1; 0	2.8; 0	2.1; 0	3.1; 0	4.1	1.0
2017 local election	1 Oct 2017	—	67.7; 8	23.5; 3	2.9; 0	2.5; 0	—	—	—	3.4	44.2

=== Vila Nova de Foz Côa ===
Polling firm/Link	Fieldwork date	Sample size	PSD	PS	CDU	O	Lead
2021 local election	26 Sep 2021	—	51.3; 3	38.6; 2	1.7; 0	8.4; 0	12.7
Multidados	7–17 Sep 2021	260	52.3	33.6	2.6	11.5	18.7
2017 local election	1 Oct 2017	—	50.5; 3	29.0; 2	1.0; 0	19.5; 0	21.5

=== Vila Nova de Gaia ===
Polling firm/Link	Fieldwork date	Sample size	PS	PSD CDS PPM	BE	CDU	PAN	L	IL	CH	O	Lead
2021 local election	26 Sep 2021	—	57.8; 9	17.6; 2	4.6; 0	4.8; 0	2.7; 0	0.5; 0	3.0; 0	4.2; 0	4.8; 0	40.2
IPOM	31 Aug–4 Sep 2021	798	62.1	16.0	4.6	4.6	1.5	1.5	1.2	3.1	5.4	46.1
2017 local election	1 Oct 2017	—	61.7; 9	20.3; 2	5.2; 0	4.5; 0	2.6; 0	—	—	—	5.8; 0	41.4

=== Vila Real ===
Polling firm/Link	Fieldwork date	Sample size	PS	PSD CDS A	BE	CDU	CH	O	Lead
2021 local election	26 Sep 2021	—	58.4; 5	28.7; 2	2.7; 0	2.1; 0	4.2; 0	3.9	29.7
Eurosondagem	16–18 Sep 2021	808	57.8	27.3	2.5	3.3	2.3	6.8	30.5
Aximage	13–18 Sep 2021	711	66	19	2	2	4	7	47
Multidados	7–17 Sep 2021	521	56.6	27.2	3.5	3.8	4.7	4.2	29.4
2017 local election	1 Oct 2017	—	64.4; 7	29.1; 2	1.6; 0	1.4; 0	—	3.5; 0	35.3

=== Viseu ===
Polling firm/Link	Fieldwork date	Sample size	PSD	PS	CDS	BE	CDU	PAN	IL	CH	O	Lead
2021 local election	26 Sep 2021	—	46.7; 5	38.3; 4	2.0; 0	2.0; 0	1.2; 0	1.3; 0	2.0; 0	3.0; 0	3.5	8.4
Eurosondagem; Seat projection	4–6 Sep 2021	1,018	52.0; 6	25.5; 3	3.3; 0	2.7; 0	2.5; 0	1.7; 0	4.2; 0	3.6; 0	4.5; 0	26.5
2017 local election	1 Oct 2017	—	51.7; 6	26.5; 3	5.1; 0	4.8; 0	3.9; 0	2.2; 0	—	—	5.9	25.2
