= Results breakdown of the 2021 Portuguese local elections by major cities =

This is the results breakdown of the 2021 Portuguese local elections for the Municipal Councils held on 26 September 2021. The following tables show detailed results in all district capitals, as well as in municipalities above 100,000 inhabitants.

== Results by City ==
=== Almada ===
Summary of the 26 September 2021 Municipal Council elections results in Almada
Parties	Votes	%	±pp swing	Councillors	
Parties	Votes	%	±pp swing	Total	±
Socialist	28,203	39.87	▲8.4	5	▲1
Unitary Democratic Coalition	21,006	29.69	▼1.1	4	0
PSD / CDS–PP / Alliance / MPT / PPM	7,574	10.71	▼5.9	1	▼1
Left Bloc	4,834	6.83	▼2.8	1	0
Chega	3,980	5.63	—N/a	0	—N/a
People–Animals–Nature	1,617	2.29	▼1.6	0	0
Liberal Initiative	1,391	1.97	—N/a	0	—N/a
Total valid	68,605	96.98	▲2.0	11	0
Blank ballots	1,324	1.87	▼1.0		
Invalid ballots	814	1.15	▼1.0		
Total	70,743	100.00			
Registered voters/turnout	151,953	46.56	▲2.3		
Source: Almada 2021 election results Archived 2021-09-29 at the Wayback Machine
Socialist hold					

=== Amadora ===
Summary of the 26 September 2021 Municipal Council elections results in Amadora
Parties	Votes	%	±pp swing	Councillors	
Parties	Votes	%	±pp swing	Total	±
Socialist	27,221	43.88	▼4.1	7	0
PSD / CDS–PP / Alliance / MPT / PDR	15,230	24.55	▲6.5	3	▲1
Unitary Democratic Coalition	6,162	9.93	▼2.3	1	0
Chega	3,375	5.44	—N/a	0	—N/a
Left Bloc	3,305	5.33	▼1.6	0	▼1
People–Animals–Nature	1,933	3.12	▼0.1	0	0
Liberal Initiative	1,729	2.79	—N/a	0	—N/a
People's Monarchist / React, Include, Recycle	377	0.61	—N/a	0	—N/a
Socialist Alternative Movement	227	0.37	—N/a	0	—N/a
Total valid	59,559	96.00	▲1.8	11	0
Blank ballots	1,469	2.37	▼1.1		
Invalid ballots	1,010	1.63	▼0.7		
Total	62,038	100.00			
Registered voters/turnout	145,310	42.69	▲0.0		
Source: Amadora 2021 election results Archived 2021-09-29 at the Wayback Machine
Socialist hold					

=== Aveiro ===
Summary of the 26 September 2021 Municipal Council elections results in Aveiro
Parties	Votes	%	±pp swing	Councillors	
Parties	Votes	%	±pp swing	Total	±
PSD / CDS–PP / PPM	17,549	51.26	▲2.7	6	0
Socialist / People–Animals–Nature	8,901	26.00	▼5.0	3	0
Left Bloc	2,191	6.40	▼0.4	0	0
Chega	1,383	4.04	—N/a	0	—N/a
Unitary Democratic Coalition	1,144	3.34	▼0.7	0	0
Liberal Initiative	790	2.31	—N/a	0	—N/a
We, the Citizens!	358	1.05	—N/a	0	—N/a
Portuguese Workers' Communist	92	0.27	—N/a	0	—N/a
Total valid	32,408	94.66	▲1.0	9	0
Blank ballots	1,235	3.61	▼0.6		
Invalid ballots	594	1.73	▼0.5		
Total	34,237	100.00			
Registered voters/turnout	70,541	48.53	▼0.6		
Source: Aveiro 2021 election results
PSD / CDS–PP / PPM hold					

=== Barcelos ===
Summary of the 26 September 2021 Municipal Council elections results in Barcelos
Parties	Votes	%	±pp swing	Councillors	
Parties	Votes	%	±pp swing	Total	±
Social Democratic / People's	33,753	45.39	▲12.6	6	▲2
Socialist	27,633	37.16	▼4.0	5	0
All Barcelos (TB)	3,323	4.47	—N/a	0	—N/a
Chega	2,780	3.74	—N/a	0	—N/a
Left Bloc	1,688	2.27	▲0.4	0	0
Unitary Democratic Coalition	1,243	1.67	▲0.2	0	0
Socialist Alternative Movement	511	0.69	▼0.5	0	0
Total valid	70,931	95.38	▼1.0	11	0
Blank ballots	2,304	3.10	▲0.9		
Invalid ballots	1,133	1.52	▲0.1		
Total	74,368	100.00			
Registered voters/turnout	106,239	70.00	▼1.7		
Source: Barcelos 2021 election results Archived 2021-11-27 at the Wayback Machine
Social Democratic / People's gain from Socialist					

=== Beja ===
Summary of the 26 September 2021 Municipal Council elections results in Beja
Parties	Votes	%	±pp swing	Councillors	
Parties	Votes	%	±pp swing	Total	±
Socialist	6,336	39.14	▼7.1	3	▼1
Unitary Democratic Coalition	5,371	32.84	▼4.8	3	0
PSD / CDS–PP / PPM / IL / Alliance	3,000	18.53	▲10.0	1	▲1
Chega	880	5.44	—N/a	0	—N/a
Left Bloc	274	1.69	▼1.7	0	0
Total valid	15,807	97.64	▲1.8	7	0
Blank ballots	230	1.42	▼1.1		
Invalid ballots	152	0.94	▼0.7		
Total	16,189	100.00			
Registered voters/turnout	28,777	56.26	▼0.3		
Source: Beja 2021 election results
Socialist hold					

=== Braga ===
Summary of the 26 September 2021 Municipal Council elections results in Braga
Parties	Votes	%	±pp swing	Councillors	
Parties	Votes	%	±pp swing	Total	±
PSD / CDS–PP / PPM / Alliance	40,585	42.89	▼9.2	6	▼1
Socialist	29,042	30.69	▲2.8	4	▲1
Unitary Democratic Coalition	6,363	6.72	▼2.9	1	0
Chega	4,411	4.66	—N/a	0	—N/a
Left Bloc	3,974	4.20	▼0.6	0	0
Liberal Initiative	2,766	2.92	—N/a	0	—N/a
People–Animals–Nature	2,593	2.74	—N/a	0	—N/a
LIVRE	573	0.61	—N/a	0	—N/a
Total valid	90,307	95.44	▼0.2	11	0
Blank ballots	3,009	3.18	▲0.4		
Invalid ballots	1,305	1.38	▼0.2		
Total	94,621	100.00			
Registered voters/turnout	166,180	56.94	▼0.7		
Source: Braga 2021 election results Archived 2021-09-29 at the Wayback Machine
PSD / CDS–PP / PPM / Alliance hold					

=== Bragança ===
Summary of the 26 September 2021 Municipal Council elections results in Bragança
Parties	Votes	%	±pp swing	Councillors	
Parties	Votes	%	±pp swing	Total	±
Social Democratic	10,307	57.51	▲0.5	5	0
Socialist	4,836	26.98	▼0.1	2	0
Chega	1,055	5.89	—N/a	0	—N/a
Unitary Democratic Coalition	398	2.22	▲0.1	0	0
People's	249	1.39	▼2.8	0	0
Left Bloc	237	1.32	▼1.4	0	0
Total valid	17,082	95.31	▲0.4	7	0
Blank ballots	531	2.96	▲0.1		
Invalid ballots	310	1.73	▼0.5		
Total	17,923	100.00			
Registered voters/turnout	35,426	50.59	▼2.0		
Source: Bragança 2021 election results
Social Democratic hold					

=== Cascais ===
Summary of the 26 September 2021 Municipal Council elections results in Cascais
Parties	Votes	%	±pp swing	Councillors	
Parties	Votes	%	±pp swing	Total	±
Social Democratic / People's	41,962	52.55	▲6.6	7	▲1
Socialist / People–Animals–Nature / LIVRE	17,265	21.62	▼12.0	3	▼1
Chega	5,927	7.42	—N/a	1	—N/a
Unitary Democratic Coalition	4,304	5.39	▼2.1	0	▼1
Liberal Initiative	3,468	4.34	—N/a	0	—N/a
Left Bloc	2,919	3.66	▼1.6	0	0
We, the Citizens! / People's Monarchist	1,471	1.84	—N/a	0	—N/a
Total valid	77,316	96.82	▲1.8	11	0
Blank ballots	1,569	1.96	▼1.2		
Invalid ballots	973	1.22	▼0.6		
Total	79,858	100.00			
Registered voters/turnout	179,237	44.55	▲1.0		
Source: Cascais 2021 election results
Social Democratic / People's hold					

=== Castelo Branco ===
Summary of the 26 September 2021 Municipal Council elections results in Castelo Branco
Parties	Votes	%	±pp swing	Councillors	
Parties	Votes	%	±pp swing	Total	±
Socialist	9,813	35.95	▼22.8	3	▼2
Always - Independent Movement (S-MI)	8,638	31.65	—N/a	3	—N/a
PSD / CDS–PP / PPM	3,131	11.47	▼15.2	1	▼1
Chega	1,961	7.18	—N/a	0	—N/a
Earth	1,606	5.88	—N/a	0	—N/a
Unitary Democratic Coalition	590	2.16	▼2.3	0	0
Left Bloc	446	1.63	▼2.9	0	0
Total valid	26,185	95.93	▲1.5	7	0
Blank ballots	653	2.39	▼0.9		
Invalid ballots	457	1.67	▼0.6		
Total	27,295	100.00			
Registered voters/turnout	48,441	56.35	▲2.9		
Source: Castelo Branco 2021 election results
Socialist hold					

=== Coimbra ===
Summary of the 26 September 2021 Municipal Council elections results in Coimbra
Parties	Votes	%	±pp swing	Councillors	
Parties	Votes	%	±pp swing	Total	±
PSD / CDS–PP / NC / PPM / Alliance / RIR / Volt	29,349	43.92	▲17.3	6	▲3
Socialist	21,820	32.65	▼2.8	4	▼1
Unitary Democratic Coalition	5,022	7.51	▼0.8	1	0
Citizens for Coimbra (CpC)	4,201	6.29	▼0.7	0	0
Chega	1,529	2.29	—N/a	0	—N/a
Liberal Initiative	1,111	1.66	—N/a	0	—N/a
People–Animals–Nature	968	1.45	▼0.1	0	0
Democratic Republican / Earth	144	0.22	—N/a	0	—N/a
Total valid	64,144	95.98	▲0.7	11	0
Blank ballots	1,948	2.91	▼0.1		
Invalid ballots	739	1.11	▼0.5		
Total	66,831	100.00			
Registered voters/turnout	126,293	52.92	▼0.5		
Source: Coimbra 2021 election results Archived 2021-09-27 at the Wayback Machine
PSD / CDS–PP / NC / PPM / Alliance / RIR / Volt gain from Socialist					

=== Évora ===
Summary of the 26 September 2021 Municipal Council elections results in Évora
Parties	Votes	%	±pp swing	Councillors	
Parties	Votes	%	±pp swing	Total	±
Unitary Democratic Coalition	6,413	27.44	▼13.1	2	▼2
Socialist	6,140	26.39	▼0.1	2	0
PSD / CDS–PP / MPT / PPM	4,458	19.07	▼1.7	2	▲1
We, the Citizens! / React, Include, Recycle	2,972	12.71	—N/a	1	—N/a
Chega	1,591	6.81	—N/a	0	—N/a
Left Bloc	888	3.80	▼1.0	0	0
Total valid	22,462	96.10	▲1.5	7	0
Blank ballots	614	2.63	▼0.9		
Invalid ballots	298	1.27	▼0.7		
Total	23,374	100.00			
Registered voters/turnout	46,895	49.84	▲0.9		
Source: Évora 2021 election results
Unitary Democratic Coalition hold					

=== Faro ===
Summary of the 26 September 2021 Municipal Council elections results in Faro
Parties	Votes	%	±pp swing	Councillors	
Parties	Votes	%	±pp swing	Total	±
PSD / CDS–PP / IL / MPT / PPM	12,195	47.76	▲3.8	6	▲1
Socialist	7,809	30.58	▼7.5	3	▼1
Unitary Democratic Coalition	1,656	6.48	▼0.9	0	0
Chega	1,311	5.13	—N/a	0	—N/a
Left Bloc	1,035	4.05	▼0.4	0	0
People–Animals–Nature	678	2.66	▲0.4	0	0
Total valid	24,684	96.66	▲0.1	9	0
Blank ballots	558	2.19	▲0.1		
Invalid ballots	294	1.15	▼0.2		
Total	25,536	100.00			
Registered voters/turnout	56,855	44.91	▼0.4		
Source: Faro 2021 election results
PSD / CDS–PP / IL / MPT / PPM hold					

=== Funchal ===
Summary of the 26 September 2021 Municipal Council elections results in Funchal
Parties	Votes	%	±pp swing	Councillors	
Parties	Votes	%	±pp swing	Total	±
Social Democratic / People's	26,841	46.98	▲6.4	6	▲1
PS / BE / PAN / MPT / PDR	22,694	39.72	▼2.3	5	▼1
Unitary Democratic Coalition	1,647	2.88	▼0.7	0	0
Chega	1,476	2.58	—N/a	0	—N/a
Together for the People	974	1.70	—N/a	0	—N/a
Liberal Initiative	720	1.26	—N/a	0	—N/a
Labour	639	1.12	▲0.4	0	0
LIVRE	257	0.45	—N/a	0	—N/a
People's Monarchist	251	0.44	▼1.9	0	0
Total valid	55,499	97.14	▲1.3	11	0
Blank ballots	478	0.84	▼0.4		
Invalid ballots	1,158	2.03	▼0.9		
Total	57,135	100.00			
Registered voters/turnout	106,357	53.72	▲1.0		
Source: Funchal 2021 election results Archived 2021-09-27 at the Wayback Machine
Social Democratic / People's gain from PS / BE / PAN / MPT / PDR					

=== Gondomar ===
Summary of the 26 September 2021 Municipal Council elections results in Gondomar
Parties	Votes	%	±pp swing	Councillors	
Parties	Votes	%	±pp swing	Total	±
Socialist	33,469	46.89	▲1.4	7	▲1
Social Democratic / People's	15,400	21.58	▲10.5	3	▲2
Unitary Democratic Coalition	7,735	10.84	▼4.5	1	▼1
Left Bloc	4,130	5.79	▲2.2	0	0
Chega	2,857	4.00	—N/a	0	—N/a
People–Animals–Nature	2,066	2.89	—N/a	0	—N/a
Liberal Initiative	1,945	2.73	—N/a	0	—N/a
Total valid	67,602	94.71	▼0.7	11	0
Blank ballots	2,311	3.24	▲1.0		
Invalid ballots	1,462	2.05	▼0.3		
Total	71,375	100.00			
Registered voters/turnout	146,210	48.82	▼7.3		
Source: Gondomar 2021 election results Archived 2021-09-26 at the Wayback Machine
Socialist hold					

=== Guarda ===
Summary of the 26 September 2021 Municipal Council elections results in Guarda
Parties	Votes	%	±pp swing	Councillors	
Parties	Votes	%	±pp swing	Total	±
For Guarda (PG)	8,559	36.22	—N/a	3	—N/a
Social Democratic	7,958	33.68	▼27.5	3	▼2
Socialist	4,249	17.98	▼5.4	1	▼1
People's	636	2.69	▼2.9	0	0
Chega	636	2.69	—N/a	0	—N/a
Left Bloc	378	1.60	▼1.4	0	0
Unitary Democratic Coalition	310	1.31	▼0.8	0	0
Total valid	22,726	96.18	▲0.9	7	0
Blank ballots	433	1.83	▼0.6		
Invalid ballots	469	1.98	▼0.3		
Total	23,628	100.00			
Registered voters/turnout	37,390	63.19	▲2.3		
Source: Guarda 2021 election results Archived 2021-09-29 at the Wayback Machine
Independent gain from Social Democratic					

=== Guimarães ===
Summary of the 26 September 2021 Municipal Council elections results in Guimarães
Parties	Votes	%	±pp swing	Councillors	
Parties	Votes	%	±pp swing	Total	±
Socialist	43,684	48.06	▼3.5	7	▲1
Social Democratic / People's	31,069	34.18	▼3.7	4	▼1
Unitary Democratic Coalition	5,028	5.53	▼0.2	0	0
Chega	2,977	3.28	—N/a	0	—N/a
Left Bloc	2,256	2.48	▲0.1	0	0
Liberal Initiative	1,619	1.78	—N/a	0	—N/a
People–Animals–Nature	1,151	1.27	—N/a	0	—N/a
Total valid	87,784	96.58	▼0.5	11	0
Blank ballots	2,258	2.48	▲0.5		
Invalid ballots	847	0.93	▼0.1		
Total	90,889	100.00			
Registered voters/turnout	142,954	63.58	▼3.2		
Source: Guimarães 2021 election results
Socialist hold					

=== Leiria ===
Summary of the 26 September 2021 Municipal Council elections results in Leiria
Parties	Votes	%	±pp swing	Councillors	
Parties	Votes	%	±pp swing	Total	±
Socialist	31,658	52.47	▼2.0	8	0
Social Democratic	13,502	22.38	▼4.6	3	0
Chega	3,424	5.67	—N/a	0	—N/a
People's / Earth	2,555	4.23	▼0.8	0	0
Unitary Democratic Coalition	1,525	2.53	▲0.1	0	0
Left Bloc	1,455	2.41	▼0.3	0	0
Liberal Initiative	1,440	2.39	—N/a	0	—N/a
People–Animals–Nature	1,103	1.83	▼0.4	0	0
LIVRE	401	0.61	—N/a	0	—N/a
Total valid	57,063	94.57	▲0.6	11	0
Blank ballots	2,134	3.54	▼0.1		
Invalid ballots	1,462	1.89	▼0.4		
Total	60,338	100.00			
Registered voters/turnout	113,419	53.20	▼1.4		
Source: Leiria 2021 election results Archived 2021-09-29 at the Wayback Machine
Socialist hold					

=== Lisbon ===
Summary of the 26 September 2021 Municipal Council elections results in Lisbon
Parties	Votes	%	±pp swing	Councillors	
Parties	Votes	%	±pp swing	Total	±
PSD / CDS–PP / Alliance / MPT / PPM	83,163	34.26	▲2.5	7	▲1
Socialist / LIVRE	80,869	33.31	▼8.7	7	▼1
Unitary Democratic Coalition	25,520	10.51	▲1.0	2	0
Left Bloc	15,054	6.20	▼0.9	1	0
Chega	10,713	4.41	—N/a	0	—N/a
Liberal Initiative	10,238	4.22	—N/a	0	—N/a
People–Animals–Nature	6,625	2.73	▼0.3	0	0
Volt Portugal	1,011	0.42	—N/a	0	—N/a
We are all Lisbon (STL)	864	0.36	—N/a	0	—N/a
We, the Citizens!	530	0.22	▼0.4	0	0
Rise Up	339	0.14	▼0.4	0	0
Democratic Republican	319	0.13	▼0.2	0	0
Total valid	235,245	96.91	▲1.1	17	0
Blank ballots	4,818	1.98	▼0.6		
Invalid ballots	2,688	1.11	▼0.4		
Total	242,751	100.00			
Registered voters/turnout	476,750	50.92	▼0.2		
Source: Lisbon 2021 election results Archived 2021-09-27 at the Wayback Machine
PSD / CDS–PP / Alliance / MPT / PPM gain from Socialist / LIVRE					

=== Loures ===
Summary of the 26 September 2021 Municipal Council elections results in Loures
Parties	Votes	%	±pp swing	Councillors	
Parties	Votes	%	±pp swing	Total	±
Socialist	25,777	31.52	▲3.3	4	0
Unitary Democratic Coalition	23,756	29.05	▼3.7	4	0
Social Democratic	11,451	14.00	▼7.5	2	▼1
Chega	6,884	8.42	—N/a	1	—N/a
Left Bloc	3,170	3.88	▲0.3	0	0
Liberal Initiative	2,729	3.34	—N/a	0	—N/a
People–Animals–Nature	1,834	2.24	▲0.1	0	0
People's	1,251	1.53	▼1.4	0	0
Portuguese Workers' Communist	1,249	1.53	▼1.0	0	0
Total valid	78,101	95.49	▲0.2	11	0
Blank ballots	2,275	2.78	▼0.0		
Invalid ballots	1,410	1.72	▼0.3		
Total	81,786	100.00			
Registered voters/turnout	169,257	48.32	▼4.0		
Source: Loures 2021 election results Archived 2021-09-26 at the Wayback Machine
Socialist gain from Unitary Democratic Coalition					

=== Maia ===
Summary of the 26 September 2021 Municipal Council elections results in Maia
Parties	Votes	%	±pp swing	Councillors	
Parties	Votes	%	±pp swing	Total	±
Social Democratic / People's	24,732	40.42	▲0.5	6	0
Socialist	19,740	32.26	▼4.3	5	0
Left Bloc	3,159	5.16	▼0.6	0	0
Unitary Democratic Coalition	2,946	4.81	▲0.2	0	0
Chega	2,355	3.85	—N/a	0	—N/a
People–Animals–Nature	2,291	3.74	▼0.7	0	0
Liberal Initiative	2,240	3.66	—N/a	0	—N/a
People's Monarchist	128	0.21	—N/a	0	—N/a
Total valid	57,591	94.11	▲0.9	11	0
Blank ballots	2,425	3.96	▼0.4		
Invalid ballots	1,178	1.93	▼0.5		
Total	61,194	100.00			
Registered voters/turnout	116,981	52.31	▼7.3		
Source: Maia 2021 election results
Social Democratic / People's hold					

=== Matosinhos ===
Summary of the 26 September 2021 Municipal Council elections results in Matosinhos
Parties	Votes	%	±pp swing	Councillors	
Parties	Votes	%	±pp swing	Total	±
Socialist	30,373	43.67	▲7.3	7	▲2
Social Democratic / People's	12,015	17.25	▲5.4	2	▲1
ANTÓNIO PARADA SIM!	6,873	9.87	▼5.3	1	▼1
Unitary Democratic Coalition	4,580	6.58	▼0.1	1	0
Left Bloc	3,938	5.66	▲1.1	0	0
Liberal Initiative	3,271	4.70	—N/a	0	—N/a
Chega	2,646	3.80	—N/a	0	—N/a
People–Animals–Nature	1,885	2.71	▼0.5	0	0
Independent Matosinhos (MI)	650	0.93	—N/a	0	—N/a
Total valid	66,231	95.11	▲1.1	11	0
Blank ballots	2,250	3.23	▼0.4		
Invalid ballots	1,155	1.66	▼0.7		
Total	69,636	100.00			
Registered voters/turnout	151,342	46.01	▼6.9		
Source: Matosinhos 2021 election results Archived 2021-09-27 at the Wayback Machine
Socialist hold					

=== Odivelas ===
Summary of the 26 September 2021 Municipal Council elections results in Odivelas
Parties	Votes	%	±pp swing	Councillors	
Parties	Votes	%	±pp swing	Total	±
Socialist	24,693	44.84	▼0.3	6	0
PSD / CDS–PP / Alliance / MPT / PDR / PPM / RIR	11,083	20.13	▼1.6	3	0
Unitary Democratic Coalition	5,965	10.83	▼4.0	1	▼1
Chega	4,795	8.71	—N/a	1	—N/a
Left Bloc	2,605	4.73	▼1.4	0	0
People–Animals–Nature	1,758	3.19	▼0.2	0	0
Liberal Initiative	1,684	3.06	—N/a	0	—N/a
Total valid	52,583	95.49	▲1.3	11	0
Blank ballots	1,449	2.63	▼0.7		
Invalid ballots	1,037	1.88	▼0.6		
Total	55,069	100.00			
Registered voters/turnout	126,833	43.42	▼3.3		
Source: Odivelas 2021 election results
Socialist hold					

=== Oeiras ===
Summary of the 26 September 2021 Municipal Council elections results in Oeiras
Parties	Votes	%	±pp swing	Councillors	
Parties	Votes	%	±pp swing	Total	±
Isaltino Inovate Oeiras (IN-OV)	38,776	50.86	▲9.2	8	▲2
Socialist	8,021	10.52	▼2.9	1	0
Social Democratic / Earth	6,032	7.91	—N/a	1	—N/a
Left Bloc / LIVRE / Volt	5,539	7.25	▲3.5	1	▲1
Unitary Democratic Coalition	3,994	5.24	▼2.6	0	▼1
Liberal Initiative	3,084	4.05	—N/a	0	—N/a
Chega	2,827	3.71	—N/a	0	—N/a
People–Animals–Nature	2,249	2.95	▼0.5	0	0
People's	1,319	1.73	—N/a	0	—N/a
Alliance / Democratic Republican	423	0.55	—N/a	0	—N/a
Total valid	72,264	94.78	▲0.0	11	0
Blank ballots	2,561	3.36	▼0.0		
Invalid ballots	1,417	1.86	0.0		
Total	76,242	100.00			
Registered voters/turnout	147,343	51.74	▼4.0		
Source: Oeiras 2021 election results
Independent hold					

=== Ponta Delgada ===
Summary of the 26 September 2021 Municipal Council elections results in Ponta Delgada
Parties	Votes	%	±pp swing	Councillors	
Parties	Votes	%	±pp swing	Total	±
Social Democratic	14,059	48.76	▼2.5	5	0
Socialist	10,763	37.33	▼1.8	4	0
Left Bloc	789	2.74	▲0.6	0	0
Liberal Initiative	782	2.71	—N/a	0	—N/a
People–Animals–Nature	586	2.03	▲0.2	0	0
Chega	544	1.92	—N/a	0	—N/a
Unitary Democratic Coalition	334	1.19	▲0.1	0	0
Total valid	27,877	96.68	▼0.5	9	0
Blank ballots	659	2.29	▲0.7		
Invalid ballots	298	1.03	▼0.2		
Total	28,834	100.00			
Registered voters/turnout	65,200	44.22	▼1.5		
Source: Ponta Delgada 2021 election results
Social Democratic hold					

=== Portalegre ===
Summary of the 26 September 2021 Municipal Council elections results in Portalegre
Parties	Votes	%	±pp swing	Councillors	
Parties	Votes	%	±pp swing	Total	±
Social Democratic / People's	4,993	38.39	▲21.0	3	▲2
Socialist	3,297	25.35	▼3.5	2	0
Free Independent Candidacy for Portalegre (CLIP)	3,267	25.12	▼6.5	2	▼1
Unitary Democratic Coalition	853	6.56	▼11.7	0	▼1
Chega	253	1.95	—N/a	0	—N/a
Left Bloc	53	0.41	▼0.5	0	0
Total valid	12,716	97.78	▲0.8	7	0
Blank ballots	159	1.22	▼0.6		
Invalid ballots	130	1.00	▼0.2		
Total	13,005	100.00			
Registered voters/turnout	20,033	64.92	▲1.7		
Source: Portalegre 2021 election results
Social Democratic / People's gain from Independent					

=== Porto ===
Summary of the 26 September 2021 Municipal Council elections results in Porto
Parties	Votes	%	±pp swing	Councillors	
Parties	Votes	%	±pp swing	Total	±
Here there's Porto. Rui Moreira (RM)	41,167	40.72	▼3.8	6	▼1
Socialist	18,201	18.00	▼10.5	3	▼1
Social Democratic	17,426	17.24	▲6.9	2	▲1
Unitary Democratic Coalition	7,609	7.53	▲1.6	1	0
Left Bloc	6,323	6.25	▲0.9	1	▲1
Chega	2,980	2.95	—N/a	0	—N/a
People–Animals–Nature	2,819	2.79	▲0.9	0	0
LIVRE	462	0.46	—N/a	0	—N/a
Volt Portugal	423	0.42	—N/a	0	—N/a
People's Monarchist	212	0.21	—N/a	0	—N/a
Rise Up	80	0.08	—N/a	0	—N/a
Total valid	97,702	96.64	▼0.4	13	0
Blank ballots	2,251	2.23	▲0.6		
Invalid ballots	1,148	1.14	▼0.3		
Total	101,101	100.00			
Registered voters/turnout	207,129	48.81	▼4.9		
Source: Porto 2021 election results Archived 2021-09-27 at the Wayback Machine
Independent hold					

=== Santarém ===
Summary of the 26 September 2021 Municipal Council elections results in Santarém
Parties	Votes	%	±pp swing	Councillors	
Parties	Votes	%	±pp swing	Total	±
Social Democratic	10,069	37.42	▼5.8	4	▼1
Socialist	8,950	33.26	▼0.8	4	0
Chega	2,133	7.93	—N/a	1	—N/a
Unitary Democratic Coalition	1,927	7.16	▼0.5	0	0
Left Bloc	1,132	4.21	▲0.1	0	0
People's	706	2.62	▼2.8	0	0
Liberal Initiative	574	2.13	—N/a	0	—N/a
People–Animals–Nature	306	1.14	—N/a	0	—N/a
Total valid	25,797	95.87	▲1.0	9	0
Blank ballots	746	2.77	▼0.5		
Invalid ballots	366	1.36	▼0.4		
Total	26,909	100.00			
Registered voters/turnout	50,899	52.87	▼0.8		
Source: Santarém 2021 election results Archived 2021-09-29 at the Wayback Machine
Social Democratic hold					

=== Santa Maria da Feira ===
Summary of the 26 September 2021 Municipal Council elections results in Santa Maria da Feira
Parties	Votes	%	±pp swing	Councillors	
Parties	Votes	%	±pp swing	Total	±
Social Democratic	34,177	48.91	▼1.6	7	0
Socialist	21,026	30.09	▼2.4	4	0
Left Bloc	2,596	3.72	▼0.4	0	0
People's	2,275	3.26	▼1.0	0	0
Chega	1,979	2.83	—N/a	0	—N/a
Liberal Initiative	1,886	2.70	—N/a	0	—N/a
Unitary Democratic Coalition	1,627	2.33	▼0.4	0	0
People–Animals–Nature	1,029	1.47	—N/a	0	—N/a
Total valid	66,595	95.31	▲0.7	11	0
Blank ballots	2,113	3.02	▼0.1		
Invalid ballots	1,167	1.67	▼0.6		
Total	69,875	100.00			
Registered voters/turnout	125,645	55.61	▼1.7		
Source: Santa Maria da Feira 2021 election results
Social Democratic hold					

=== Seixal ===
Summary of the 26 September 2021 Municipal Council elections results in Seixal
Parties	Votes	%	±pp swing	Councillors	
Parties	Votes	%	±pp swing	Total	±
Unitary Democratic Coalition	23,485	37.74	▲1.2	5	0
Socialist	19,204	30.86	▼0.5	4	0
Social Democratic	5,795	9.31	▼2.5	1	0
Chega	5,022	8.07	—N/a	1	—N/a
Left Bloc	2,700	4.34	▼3.1	0	▼1
People–Animals–Nature	1,713	2.75	▲1.4	0	0
Liberal Initiative	1,144	1.84	—N/a	0	—N/a
CDS–PP / PDR / Alliance / MPT	908	1.46	▼1.3	0	0
Total valid	59,971	96.37	▲1.9	11	0
Blank ballots	1,395	2.24	▼1.0		
Invalid ballots	862	1.39	▼0.9		
Total	62,228	100.00			
Registered voters/turnout	142,900	43.55	▲0.3		
Source: Seixal 2021 election results
Unitary Democratic Coalition hold					

=== Setúbal ===
Summary of the 26 September 2021 Municipal Council elections results in Setúbal
Parties	Votes	%	±pp swing	Councillors	
Parties	Votes	%	±pp swing	Total	±
Unitary Democratic Coalition	15,316	34.40	▼15.5	5	▼2
Socialist	12,316	27.67	▲5.9	4	▲1
Social Democratic	7,377	16.57	▲5.6	2	▲1
Chega	2,619	5.88	—N/a	0	—N/a
Left Bloc	1,884	4.23	▼1.0	0	0
Liberal Initiative	1,035	2.35	—N/a	0	—N/a
People–Animals–Nature	1,009	2.27	▼0.6	0	0
People's	765	1.72	▼1.5	0	0
We, the Citizens! / People's Monarchist	328	0.74	—N/a	0	—N/a
React, Include, Recycle / Democratic Republican	237	0.53	—N/a	0	—N/a
Total valid	42,886	96.33	▲0.3	11	0
Blank ballots	1,052	2.36	▼0.1		
Invalid ballots	580	1.30	▼0.2		
Total	44,518	100.00			
Registered voters/turnout	105,651	42.14	▼1.0		
Source: Setúbal 2021 election results
Unitary Democratic Coalition hold					

=== Sintra ===
Summary of the 26 September 2021 Municipal Council elections results in Sintra
Parties	Votes	%	±pp swing	Councillors	
Parties	Votes	%	±pp swing	Total	±
Socialist	45,724	35.25	▼7.8	5	▼1
PSD / CDS–PP / Alliance / MPT / PDR / PPM / RIR	35,702	27.53	▼1.5	4	0
Chega	11,786	9.09	—N/a	1	—N/a
Unitary Democratic Coalition	11,701	9.02	▼0.4	1	0
Left Bloc	7,539	5.81	▼0.5	0	0
People–Animals–Nature	4,214	3.25	▼0.4	0	0
We, the Citizens!	3,848	2.97	▲1.9	0	0
Liberal Initiative	3,475	2.68	—N/a	0	—N/a
Total valid	123,989	95.59	▲0.7	11	0
Blank ballots	3,489	2.69	▼0.2		
Invalid ballots	2,228	1.72	▼0.5		
Total	129,706	100.00			
Registered voters/turnout	323,280	40.12	▼2.2		
Source: Sintra 2021 election results
Socialist hold					

=== Viana do Castelo ===
Summary of the 26 September 2021 Municipal Council elections results in Viana do Castelo
Parties	Votes	%	±pp swing	Councillors	
Parties	Votes	%	±pp swing	Total	±
Socialist	20,970	45.05	▼8.6	5	▼1
Social Democratic / People's	11,447	24.59	▼2.3	3	▲1
Unitary Democratic Coalition	4,673	10.04	▼1.9	1	0
Left Bloc	2,114	4.54	▼0.8	0	0
Alliance	1,788	3.84	—N/a	0	—N/a
Chega	1,605	3.45	—N/a	0	—N/a
Liberal Initiative	836	1.80	—N/a	0	—N/a
We, the Citizens!	472	1.01	—N/a	0	—N/a
Total valid	43,905	94.32	▼0.1	9	0
Blank ballots	1,728	3.71	▼0.1		
Invalid ballots	914	1.96	▲0.2		
Total	46,547	100.00			
Registered voters/turnout	82,728	56.27	▲1.1		
Source: Viana do Castelo 2021 election results
Socialist hold					

=== Vila Franca de Xira ===
Summary of the 26 September 2021 Municipal Council elections results in Vila Franca de Xira
Parties	Votes	%	±pp swing	Councillors	
Parties	Votes	%	±pp swing	Total	±
Socialist	20,640	39.59	▲0.5	5	0
Unitary Democratic Coalition	11,432	21.93	▼8.5	3	▼1
PSD / CDS–PP / MPT / PPM	7,737	14.84	▲1.2	2	▲1
Chega	4,447	8.53	—N/a	1	—N/a
Left Bloc	3,130	6.00	▼1.0	0	▼1
People–Animals–Nature	2,018	3.87	▼0.0	0	0
Total valid	49,404	94.77	▲0.3	11	0
Blank ballots	1,849	3.55	▲0.2		
Invalid ballots	877	1.68	▼0.5		
Total	52,130	100.00			
Registered voters/turnout	113,975	45.74	▼2.7		
Source: Vila Franca de Xira 2021 election results
Socialist hold					

=== Vila Nova de Famalicão ===
Summary of the 26 September 2021 Municipal Council elections results in Vila Nova de Famalicão
Parties	Votes	%	±pp swing	Councillors	
Parties	Votes	%	±pp swing	Total	±
Social Democratic / People's	40,143	52.88	▼14.8	7	▼1
Socialist	24,409	32.16	▲8.6	4	▲1
Chega	2,143	2.82	—N/a	0	—N/a
Unitary Democratic Coalition	1,835	2.42	▼0.5	0	0
Liberal Initiative	1,762	2.32	—N/a	0	—N/a
Left Bloc	1,423	1.87	▼0.6	0	0
People–Animals–Nature	1,214	1.60	—N/a	0	—N/a
Total valid	72,929	96.07	▼0.5	11	0
Blank ballots	2,074	2.73	▲0.5		
Invalid ballots	906	1.19	▼0.0		
Total	75,909	100.00			
Registered voters/turnout	119,499	63.52	▼0.4		
Source: Vila Nova de Famalicão 2021 election results Archived 2021-10-03 at the Wayback Machine
Social Democratic / People's hold					

=== Vila Nova de Gaia ===
Summary of the 26 September 2021 Municipal Council elections results in Vila Nova de Gaia
Parties	Votes	%	±pp swing	Councillors	
Parties	Votes	%	±pp swing	Total	±
Socialist	73,712	57.79	▼3.9	9	0
PSD / CDS–PP / PPM	22,407	17.57	▼2.7	2	0
Unitary Democratic Coalition	6,162	4.83	▲0.3	0	0
Left Bloc	5,886	4.61	▼0.6	0	0
Chega	5,368	4.21	—N/a	0	—N/a
Liberal Initiative	3,760	2.95	—N/a	0	—N/a
People–Animals–Nature	3,484	2.73	▲0.1	0	0
Democratic Republican / Earth	606	0.48	—N/a	0	—N/a
LIVRE	582	0.46	—N/a	0	—N/a
Total valid	121,967	95.63	▲0.4	11	0
Blank ballots	3,562	2.79	▼0.2		
Invalid ballots	2,017	1.58	▼0.1		
Total	127,546	100.00			
Registered voters/turnout	267,468	47.69	▼4.4		
Source: Vila Nova de Gaia 2021 election results
Socialist hold					

=== Vila Real ===
Summary of the 26 September 2021 Municipal Council elections results in Vila Real
Parties	Votes	%	±pp swing	Councillors	
Parties	Votes	%	±pp swing	Total	±
Socialist	17,472	58.44	▼6.0	5	▼2
Social Democratic / People's / Alliance	8,576	28.68	▼0.4	2	0
Chega	1,246	4.17	—N/a	0	—N/a
Left Bloc	802	2.68	▼1.0	0	0
Unitary Democratic Coalition	633	2.12	▲0.8	0	0
Total valid	28,729	96.09	▼0.4	7	▼2
Blank ballots	717	2.40	▲0.5		
Invalid ballots	452	1.51	▼0.1		
Total	29,898	100.00			
Registered voters/turnout	49,701	60.16	▼1.8		
Source: Vila Real 2021 election results
Socialist hold					

=== Viseu ===
Summary of the 26 September 2021 Municipal Council elections results in Viseu
Parties	Votes	%	±pp swing	Councillors	
Parties	Votes	%	±pp swing	Total	±
Social Democratic	24,363	46.68	▼5.1	5	▼1
Socialist	19,968	38.26	▲11.8	4	▲1
Chega	1,542	2.95	—N/a	0	—N/a
Liberal Initiative	1,147	2.20	—N/a	0	—N/a
People's	1,054	2.02	▼3.1	0	0
Left Bloc	1,051	2.01	▼2.8	0	0
People–Animals–Nature	657	1.26	▼0.9	0	0
Unitary Democratic Coalition	609	1.17	▼2.7	0	0
Total valid	50,391	96.55	▲2.4	9	0
Blank ballots	1,135	2.17	▼1.4		
Invalid ballots	663	1.27	▼1.0		
Total	52,189	100.00			
Registered voters/turnout	92,444	56.45	▲5.7		
Source: Viseu 2021 election results
Social Democratic hold					
