= We, the Citizens! =

Political party in Portugal

We, the Citizens! Nós, Cidadãos!
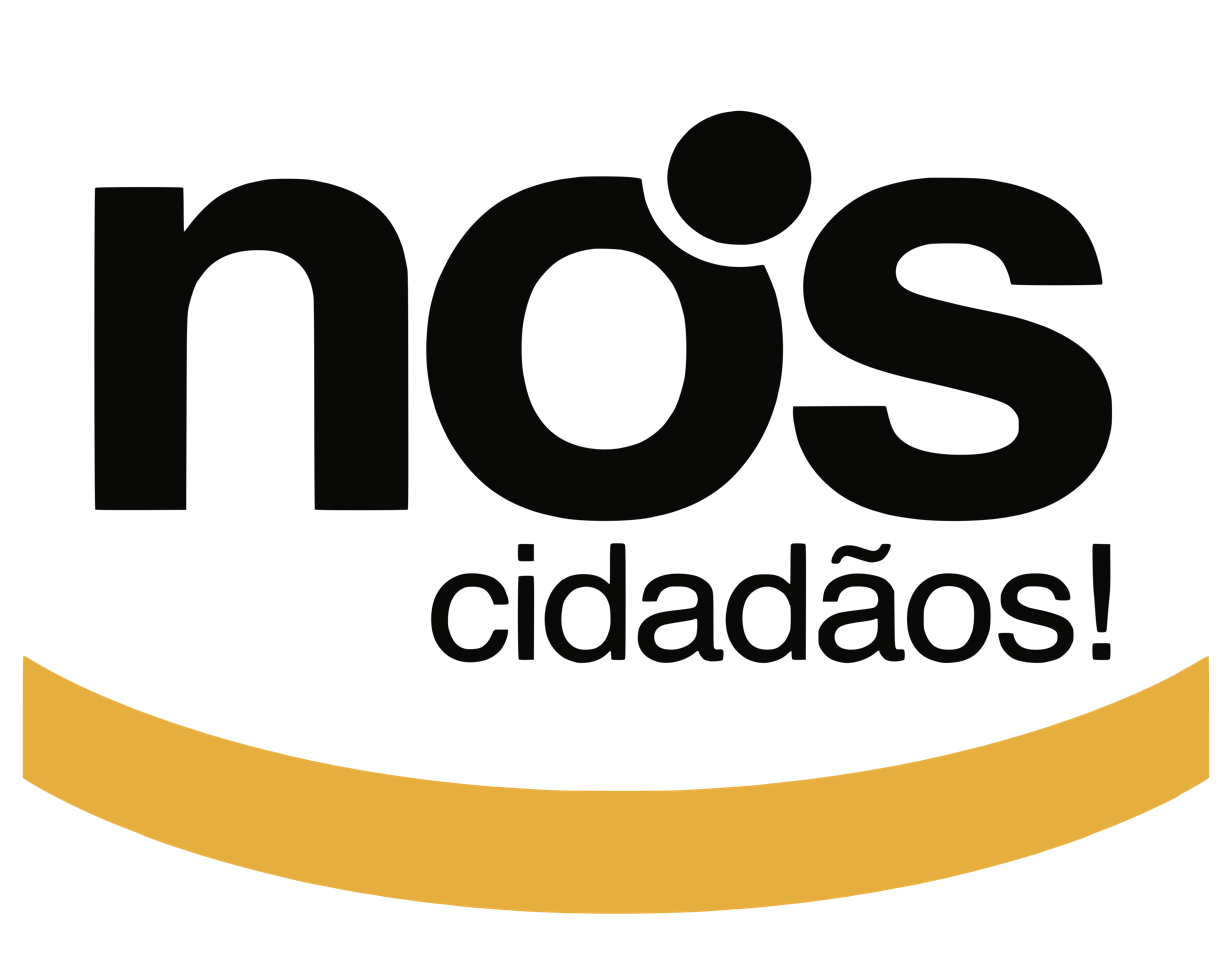
- Abbreviation: NC
- President: Joaquim Rocha Afonso
- Founded: 23 June 2015
- Headquarters: Rua Gonçalves Crespo, 16A – 1150–185 Lisboa
- Think tank: Instituto Democracia Portuguesa
- Youth wing: We, the Youth!
- Ideology: Liberalism; Localism
- Political position: Centre-right; Catch-all party
- Colours: Gold
- Assembly of the Republic: 0 / 230
- European Parliament: 0 / 21
- Regional Parliaments: 0 / 104
- Local government (Mayors): 2 / 308
- Local assemblies: 28 / 6,444
- Local government (Parishes): 29 / 3,216

Election symbol
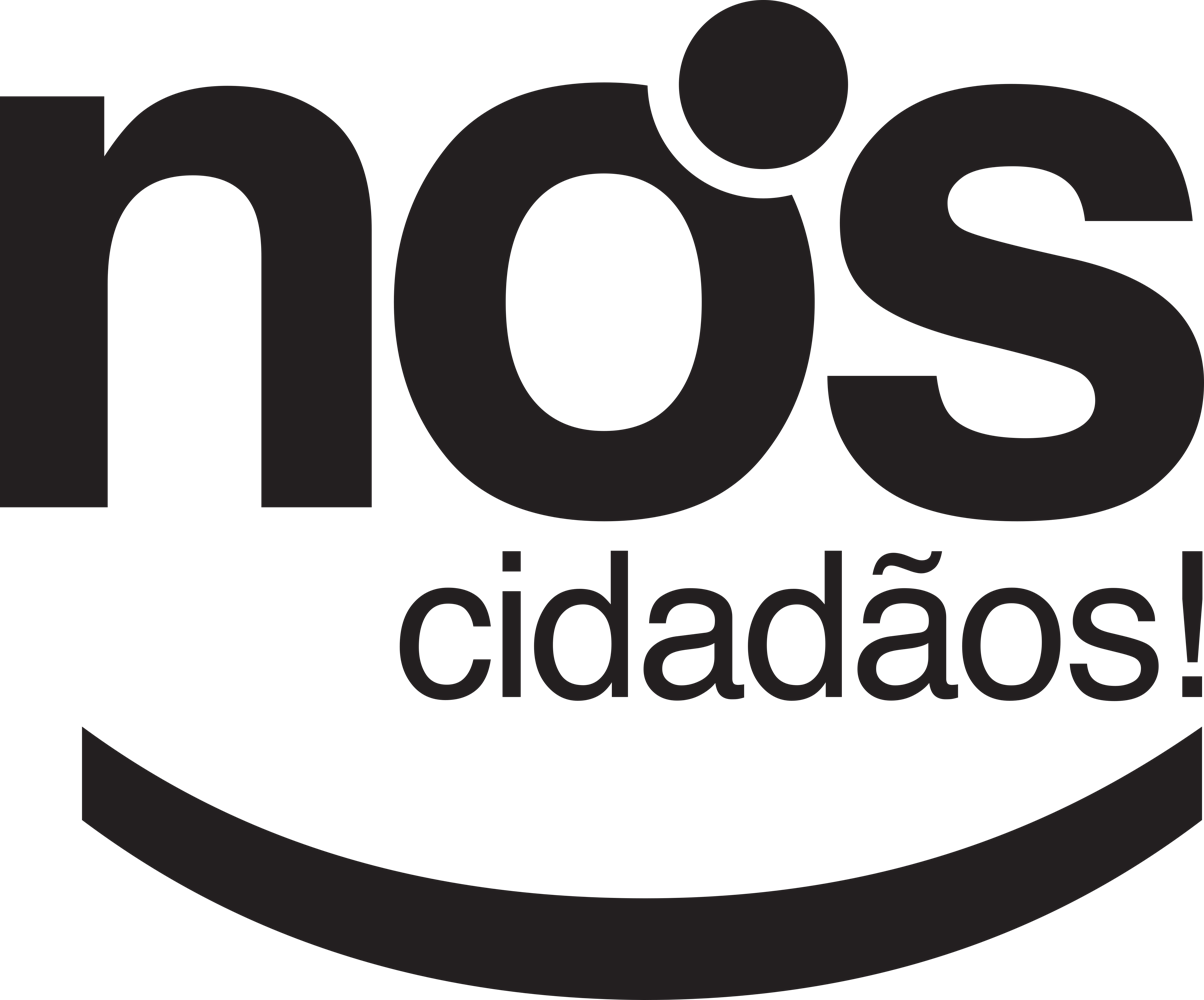

Website
- noscidadaos.pt

We, the Citizens! (Portuguese: Nós, Cidadãos!) is a Portuguese political party founded by members of the Portuguese Institute of Democracy (Instituto Democracia Portuguesa, IDP) after the large protest against the introduction of a single social tax in 2012.

== History ==
IDP is a civic association founded in 2007 and advocating the need for a more democratic society, respecting the sovereignty of the people and the rule of law. Nós, Cidadãos! claims to be "Classical Social Democrats", and campaign on government and judicial reform, participatory democracy, sustainability and social justice. The party strongly supports European integration. It is supported by several prominent judges and legal scholars as well as the famous Portuguese singer and composer José Cid.

In the legislative elections of 2015, they received 21,382 votes, ranked 12th, and did not elect any member of parliament. One quirk of their performance, however, was their second place in the "Outside Europe" constituency, behind the Portugal à Frente coalition. They even came top among registered voters in China. The Constitutional Court rejected a petition by the Socialist Party, who came third, to contest the election on the grounds of alleged electoral fraud.

== Election results ==
=== Assembly of the Republic ===
Election	Leader	Votes	%	Seats	+/-	Government
2015	Mendo Castro Henriques	21,439	0.4 (#12)	0 / 230	New	No seats
2019	Mendo Castro Henriques	12,379	0.2 (#15)	0 / 230	0	No seats
2022	Joaquim Rocha Afonso	2,997	0.1 (#21)	0 / 230	0	No seats
2024	Joaquim Rocha Afonso	2,399	0.0 (#21)	0 / 230	0	No seats
2025	Joaquim Rocha Afonso	3,304	0.1 (#18)	0 / 230	0	No seats

=== European Parliament ===
Election	Leader	Votes	%	Seats	+/–	EP Group
2019	Paulo de Morais	34,672	1.1 (#10)	0 / 21	New	–
2024	Pedro Ladeira	4,242	0.1 (#17)	0 / 21	0	–

=== Local elections ===
The following results include NC led coalitions.

Election	Leader	Votes	%	Mayors	+/-	Councillors	+/-	Assemblies	+/-	Parishes	+/-	Parish Assemblies	+/-
2017	Mendo Castro Henriques	12,497	0.3 (#10)	1 / 308		5 / 2,074		15 / 6,461		3 / 3,092		42 / 27,019	
2021	Joaquim Rocha Afonso	25,193	0.5 (#11)	0 / 308	▼1	6 / 2,604	▲1	28 / 6,448	▲13	3 / 3,066	0	68 / 26,797	▲26
2025	Joaquim Rocha Afonso	19,968	0.4 (#11)	2 / 308	▲2	8 / 2,058	▲2	36 / 6,463	▲8	29 / 3,216	▲26	198 / 27,973	▲130
