= Vila Real (Assembly of the Republic constituency) =

Constituency of the Assembly of the Republic, the national legislature of Portugal

- Constituency for the Assembly of the Republic
- Location of Vila Real within Portugal
- District: Vila Real
- Population: 184,707 (2024)
- Electorate: 206,897 (2025)
- Area: 4,307 km^{2} (2024)

Current Constituency
- Created: 1976
- Seats: List: 5 (1995–present); 6 (1979–1995); 7 (1976–1979)
- Deputies: List: Amílcar Almeida (PSD); Fernando Queiroga (PSD); Rui Jorge Santos (PS); Ana Silveira (PSD); Manuela Tender (CH)

Vila Real is one of the 22 multi-member constituencies of the Assembly of the Republic, the national legislature of Portugal. The constituency was established in 1976 when the Assembly of the Republic was established by the constitution following the restoration of democracy. It is conterminous with the district of Vila Real. The constituency currently elects five of the 230 members of the Assembly of the Republic using the closed party-list proportional representation electoral system. At the 2025 legislative election it had 206,897 registered electors.

== Electoral system ==
Vila Real currently elects five of the 230 members of the Assembly of the Republic using the closed party-list proportional representation electoral system. Seats are allocated using the D'Hondt method.

== Election results ==
=== Summary ===
Election	Unitary Democrats CDU / APU / PCP			Left Bloc BE / UDP			LIVRE L			Socialists PS / FRS			People Animals Nature PAN			Democratic Renewal PRD			Social Democrats PSD / PàF / AD / PPD			Liberals IL			CDS – People's CDS–PP / CDS			Chega CH / PPV/CDC / PPV		
Election	Votes	%	Seats	Votes	%	Seats	Votes	%	Seats	Votes	%	Seats	Votes	%	Seats	Votes	%	Seats	Votes	%	Seats	Votes	%	Seats	Votes	%	Seats	Votes	%	Seats
2025	1,403	1.26%	0	1,144	1.03%	0	1,740	1.57%	0	27,990	25.18%	1	775	0.70%	0				50,525	45.45%	3	2,482	2.23%	0				22,786	20.50%	1
2024	1,600	1.40%	0	2,865	2.51%	0	1,592	1.40%	0	34,660	30.39%	2	1,062	0.93%	0				46,046	40.38%	2	2,380	2.09%	0				20,038	17.57%	1
2022	1,775	1.72%	0	2,442	2.36%	0	566	0.55%	0	43,489	42.11%	3	815	0.79%	0				42,128	40.79%	2	1,898	1.84%	0	1,665	1.61%	0	7,569	7.33%	0
2019	2,513	2.63%	0	6,071	6.35%	0	547	0.57%	0	37,312	39.04%	2	1,632	1.71%	0				39,136	40.95%	3	427	0.45%	0	4,520	4.73%	0	792	0.83%	0
2015	3,262	3.07%	0	5,697	5.35%	0	383	0.36%	0	36,462	34.27%	2	664	0.62%	0				56,262	52.88%	3									
2011	3,656	3.15%	0	2,784	2.40%	0				34,825	30.01%	2	617	0.53%	0				61,455	52.96%	3				10,385	8.95%	0			
2009	3,620	2.95%	0	6,929	5.64%	0				45,531	37.08%	2							51,820	42.20%	3				12,728	10.37%	0	184	0.15%	0
2005	3,275	2.67%	0	3,019	2.46%	0				55,123	44.98%	3							50,545	41.25%	2				8,509	6.94%	0			
2002	2,516	2.03%	0	1,116	0.90%	0				40,368	32.49%	2							68,518	55.15%	3				10,225	8.23%	0			
1999	3,004	2.46%	0	1,001	0.82%	0				50,713	41.57%	2							56,646	46.43%	3				8,507	6.97%	0			
1995	2,567	1.97%	0	506	0.39%	0				53,259	40.80%	2							61,290	46.95%	3				10,420	7.98%	0			
1991	3,377	2.64%	0							34,051	26.64%	2				522	0.41%	0	79,190	61.95%	4				6,692	5.24%	0			
1987	5,559	4.23%	0	544	0.41%	0				27,639	21.03%	1				1,832	1.39%	0	84,965	64.64%	5				6,741	5.13%	0			
1985	7,804	6.19%	0	1,108	0.88%	0				30,129	23.90%	2				11,350	9.00%	0	55,388	43.93%	3				16,375	12.99%	1			
1983	7,089	5.57%	0	832	0.65%	0				42,758	33.57%	2							55,547	43.61%	3				16,768	13.16%	1			
1980	7,374	5.32%	0	1,097	0.79%	0				32,733	23.61%	1							89,209	64.35%	5									
1979	8,920	6.44%	0	2,222	1.60%	0				36,184	26.11%	2							84,071	60.66%	4									
1976	4,086	3.39%	0	1,192	0.99%	0				34,277	28.44%	2							50,736	42.10%	4				23,808	19.76%	1			

(Figures in italics represent alliances.)

=== Detailed ===
==== 2020s ====
===== 2025 =====
Results of the 2025 legislative election held on 18 May 2025:

Party		Votes	%	Seats
Democratic Alliance	AD	50,525	45.45%	3
Socialist Party	PS	27,990	25.18%	1
Chega	CH	22,786	20.50%	1
Liberal Initiative	IL	2,482	2.23%	0
LIVRE	L	1,740	1.57%	0
National Democratic Alternative	ADN	1,714	1.54%	0
Unitary Democratic Coalition	CDU	1,403	1.26%	0
Left Bloc	BE	1,144	1.03%	0
People Animals Nature	PAN	775	0.70%	0
People's Monarchist Party	PPM	186	0.17%	0
React, Include, Recycle	RIR	183	0.16%	0
Ergue-te	E	132	0.12%	0
Volt Portugal	Volt	114	0.10%	0
Valid votes		111,174	100.00%	5
Blank votes		1,368	1.20%	
Rejected votes – other		1,300	1.14%	
Total polled		113,842	55.02%	
Registered electors		206,897		

The following candidates were elected:: Amílcar Almeida (AD); Ana Paula Martins (AD); Fernando Queiroga (AD); Rui Jorge Santos (PS); and Manuela Tender (CH).

===== 2024 =====
Results of the 2024 legislative election held on 10 March 2024:

Party		Votes	%	Seats
Democratic Alliance	AD	46,046	40.38%	2
Socialist Party	PS	34,660	30.39%	2
Chega	CH	20,038	17.57%	1
National Democratic Alternative	ADN	2,959	2.59%	0
Left Bloc	BE	2,865	2.51%	0
Liberal Initiative	IL	2,380	2.09%	0
Unitary Democratic Coalition	CDU	1,600	1.40%	0
LIVRE	L	1,592	1.40%	0
People Animals Nature	PAN	1,062	0.93%	0
React, Include, Recycle	RIR	319	0.28%	0
New Right	ND	278	0.24%	0
Volt Portugal	Volt	121	0.11%	0
Ergue-te	E	117	0.10%	0
Valid votes		114,037	100.00%	5
Blank votes		1,494	1.28%	
Rejected votes – other		1,527	1.30%	
Total polled		117,058	56.28%	
Registered electors		207,989		

The following candidates were elected: Amílcar Almeida (AD); António Alberto Machado (AD); Fátima Correia Pinto (PS); Carlos Silva (PS); and Manuela Tender (CH).

===== 2022 =====
Results of the 2022 legislative election held on 30 January 2022:

Party		Votes	%	Seats
Socialist Party	PS	43,489	42.11%	3
Social Democratic Party	PSD	42,128	40.79%	2
Chega	CH	7,569	7.33%	0
Left Bloc	BE	2,442	2.36%	0
Liberal Initiative	IL	1,898	1.84%	0
Unitary Democratic Coalition	CDU	1,775	1.72%	0
CDS – People's Party	CDS–PP	1,665	1.61%	0
People Animals Nature	PAN	815	0.79%	0
LIVRE	L	566	0.55%	0
React, Include, Recycle	RIR	369	0.36%	0
Socialist Alternative Movement	MAS	206	0.20%	0
We, the Citizens!	NC	144	0.14%	0
Ergue-te	E	79	0.08%	0
Volt Portugal	Volt	76	0.07%	0
Earth Party	PT	64	0.06%	0
Valid votes		103,285	100.00%	5
Blank votes		943	0.90%	
Rejected votes – other		1,080	1.03%	
Total polled		105,308	49.42%	
Registered electors		213,093		

The following candidates were elected: Artur Soveral Andrade (PSD); Cláudia Bento (PSD); Fátima Correia Pinto (PS); Francisco Rocha (PS); and Agostinho Santa (PS).

==== 2010s ====
===== 2019 =====
Results of the 2019 legislative election held on 6 October 2019:

Party		Votes	%	Seats
Social Democratic Party	PSD	39,136	40.95%	3
Socialist Party	PS	37,312	39.04%	2
Left Bloc	BE	6,071	6.35%	0
CDS – People's Party	CDS–PP	4,520	4.73%	0
Unitary Democratic Coalition	CDU	2,513	2.63%	0
People Animals Nature	PAN	1,632	1.71%	0
Chega	CH	792	0.83%	0
Alliance	A	696	0.73%	0
React, Include, Recycle	RIR	649	0.68%	0
Portuguese Workers' Communist Party	PCTP	570	0.60%	0
LIVRE	L	547	0.57%	0
Liberal Initiative	IL	427	0.45%	0
Democratic Republican Party	PDR	189	0.20%	0
People's Monarchist Party	PPM	188	0.20%	0
We, the Citizens!	NC	171	0.18%	0
National Renewal Party	PNR	161	0.17%	0
Valid votes		95,574	100.00%	5
Blank votes		2,246	2.24%	
Rejected votes – other		2,416	2.41%	
Total polled		100,236	45.75%	
Registered electors		219,081		

The following candidates were elected: Artur Soveral Andrade (PSD); Cláudia Bento (PSD); Luís Leite Ramos (PSD); Francisco Rocha (PS); and Ascenso Simões (PS).

===== 2015 =====
Results of the 2015 legislative election held on 4 October 2015:

Party		Votes	%	Seats
Portugal Ahead	PàF	56,262	52.88%	3
Socialist Party	PS	36,462	34.27%	2
Left Bloc	BE	5,697	5.35%	0
Unitary Democratic Coalition	CDU	3,262	3.07%	0
Portuguese Workers' Communist Party	PCTP	1,010	0.95%	0
Democratic Republican Party	PDR	804	0.76%	0
People Animals Nature	PAN	664	0.62%	0
ACT! (Portuguese Labour Party and Socialist Alternative Movement)	AGIR	518	0.49%	0
LIVRE	L	383	0.36%	0
People's Monarchist Party	PPM	318	0.30%	0
The Earth Party Movement	MPT	301	0.28%	0
National Renewal Party	PNR	280	0.26%	0
We, the Citizens!	NC	279	0.26%	0
United Party of Retirees and Pensioners	PURP	153	0.14%	0
Valid votes		106,393	100.00%	5
Blank votes		1,932	1.75%	
Rejected votes – other		1,954	1.77%	
Total polled		110,279	47.96%	
Registered electors		229,963		

The following candidates were elected: Luís Pedro Pimentel (PàF); Luís Leite Ramos (PàF); Francisco Rocha (PS); Ascenso Simões (PS); and Maria Manuela Tender (PàF).

===== 2011 =====
Results of the 2011 legislative election held on 5 June 2011:

Party		Votes	%	Seats
Social Democratic Party	PSD	61,455	52.96%	3
Socialist Party	PS	34,825	30.01%	2
CDS – People's Party	CDS–PP	10,385	8.95%	0
Unitary Democratic Coalition	CDU	3,656	3.15%	0
Left Bloc	BE	2,784	2.40%	0
Portuguese Workers' Communist Party	PCTP	675	0.58%	0
Party for Animals and Nature	PAN	617	0.53%	0
People's Monarchist Party	PPM	574	0.49%	0
The Earth Party Movement	MPT	304	0.26%	0
Portuguese Labour Party	PTP	254	0.22%	0
Hope for Portugal Movement	MEP	234	0.20%	0
National Renewal Party	PNR	147	0.13%	0
Democratic Party of the Atlantic	PDA	121	0.10%	0
Valid votes		116,031	100.00%	5
Blank votes		2,043	1.71%	
Rejected votes – other		1,477	1.24%	
Total polled		119,551	50.80%	
Registered electors		235,328		

The following candidates were elected: Pedro Passos Coelho (PSD); Pedro Silva Pereira (PS); Luís Leite Ramos (PSD); Rui Jorge Santos (PS); and Maria Manuela Tender (PSD).

==== 2000s ====
===== 2009 =====
Results of the 2009 legislative election held on 27 September 2009:

Party		Votes	%	Seats
Social Democratic Party	PSD	51,820	42.20%	3
Socialist Party	PS	45,531	37.08%	2
CDS – People's Party	CDS–PP	12,728	10.37%	0
Left Bloc	BE	6,929	5.64%	0
Unitary Democratic Coalition	CDU	3,620	2.95%	0
Portuguese Workers' Communist Party	PCTP	764	0.62%	0
Hope for Portugal Movement	MEP	358	0.29%	0
People's Monarchist Party	PPM	330	0.27%	0
Merit and Society Movement	MMS	275	0.22%	0
The Earth Party Movement and Humanist Party	MPT-PH	258	0.21%	0
Pro-Life Party	PPV	184	0.15%	0
Valid votes		122,797	100.00%	5
Blank votes		1,573	1.25%	
Rejected votes – other		1,754	1.39%	
Total polled		126,124	53.38%	
Registered electors		236,262		

The following candidates were elected: José de Bianchi (PS); António Cabeleira (PSD); António Montalvão Machado (PSD); Pedro Silva Pereira (PS); and Isabel Sequeira (PSD).

===== 2005 =====
Results of the 2005 legislative election held on 20 February 2005:

Party		Votes	%	Seats
Socialist Party	PS	55,123	44.98%	3
Social Democratic Party	PSD	50,545	41.25%	2
CDS – People's Party	CDS–PP	8,509	6.94%	0
Unitary Democratic Coalition	CDU	3,275	2.67%	0
Left Bloc	BE	3,019	2.46%	0
New Democracy Party	ND	631	0.51%	0
Portuguese Workers' Communist Party	PCTP	562	0.46%	0
Humanist Party	PH	507	0.41%	0
National Renewal Party	PNR	207	0.17%	0
Democratic Party of the Atlantic	PDA	164	0.13%	0
Valid votes		122,542	100.00%	5
Blank votes		1,663	1.32%	
Rejected votes – other		1,630	1.30%	
Total polled		125,835	56.81%	
Registered electors		221,516		

The following candidates were elected: Rosário Águas (PSD); Paula Barros (PS); Ricardo Martins (PSD); Pedro Silva Pereira (PS); and Ascenso Simões (PS).

===== 2002 =====
Results of the 2002 legislative election held on 17 March 2002:

Party		Votes	%	Seats
Social Democratic Party	PSD	68,518	55.15%	3
Socialist Party	PS	40,368	32.49%	2
CDS – People's Party	CDS–PP	10,225	8.23%	0
Unitary Democratic Coalition	CDU	2,516	2.03%	0
Left Bloc	BE	1,116	0.90%	0
Humanist Party	PH	431	0.35%	0
Portuguese Workers' Communist Party	PCTP	419	0.34%	0
People's Monarchist Party	PPM	334	0.27%	0
The Earth Party Movement	MPT	307	0.25%	0
Valid votes		124,234	100.00%	5
Blank votes		842	0.66%	
Rejected votes – other		1,654	1.31%	
Total polled		126,730	57.42%	
Registered electors		220,723		

The following candidates were elected: Assunção Esteves (PSD); Bessa Guerra (PSD); António Nazaré Pereira (PSD); Pedro Silva Pereira (PS); and Ascenso Simões (PS).

==== 1990s ====
===== 1999 =====
Results of the 1999 legislative election held on 10 October 1999:

Party		Votes	%	Seats
Social Democratic Party	PSD	56,646	46.43%	3
Socialist Party	PS	50,713	41.57%	2
CDS – People's Party	CDS–PP	8,507	6.97%	0
Unitary Democratic Coalition	CDU	3,004	2.46%	0
Left Bloc	BE	1,001	0.82%	0
People's Monarchist Party	PPM	654	0.54%	0
Portuguese Workers' Communist Party	PCTP	645	0.53%	0
National Solidarity Party	PSN	509	0.42%	0
The Earth Party Movement	MPT	328	0.27%	0
Valid votes		122,007	100.00%	5
Blank votes		861	0.69%	
Rejected votes – other		1,542	1.24%	
Total polled		124,410	56.69%	
Registered electors		219,442		

The following candidates were elected: António Martinho (PS); Manuel do Nascimento Martins (PSD); António Nazaré Pereira (PSD); Vitor Ramalho (PS); and Francisco Tavares (PSD).

===== 1995 =====
Results of the 1995 legislative election held on 1 October 1995:

Party		Votes	%	Seats
Social Democratic Party	PSD	61,290	46.95%	3
Socialist Party	PS	53,259	40.80%	2
CDS – People's Party	CDS–PP	10,420	7.98%	0
Unitary Democratic Coalition	CDU	2,567	1.97%	0
Portuguese Workers' Communist Party	PCTP	772	0.59%	0
Revolutionary Socialist Party	PSR	683	0.52%	0
National Solidarity Party	PSN	528	0.40%	0
People's Party	PG	519	0.40%	0
Popular Democratic Union	UDP	506	0.39%	0
Valid votes		130,544	100.00%	5
Blank votes		692	0.52%	
Rejected votes – other		1,934	1.45%	
Total polled		133,170	59.45%	
Registered electors		224,022		

The following candidates were elected: Eurico Figueiredo (PS); António Martinho (PS); Costa Pereira (PSD); Fernando Pereira (PSD); and Eduardo Azevedo Soares (PSD).

===== 1991 =====
Results of the 1991 legislative election held on 6 October 1991:

Party		Votes	%	Seats
Social Democratic Party	PSD	79,190	61.95%	4
Socialist Party	PS	34,051	26.64%	2
Social Democratic Centre Party	CDS	6,692	5.24%	0
Unitary Democratic Coalition	CDU	3,377	2.64%	0
National Solidarity Party	PSN	1,560	1.22%	0
Revolutionary Socialist Party	PSR	1,064	0.83%	0
People's Monarchist Party	PPM	766	0.60%	0
Portuguese Workers' Communist Party	PCTP	606	0.47%	0
Democratic Renewal Party	PRD	522	0.41%	0
Valid votes		127,828	100.00%	6
Blank votes		802	0.61%	
Rejected votes – other		2,141	1.64%	
Total polled		130,771	60.96%	
Registered electors		214,502		

The following candidates were elected: José Costa Leite (PSD); Eurico Figueiredo (PS); António Martinho (PS); Valente de Oliveira (PSD); Fernando Pereira (PSD); and Nuno Ribeiro da Silva (PSD).

==== 1980s ====
===== 1987 =====
Results of the 1987 legislative election held on 19 July 1987:

Party		Votes	%	Seats
Social Democratic Party	PSD	84,965	64.64%	5
Socialist Party	PS	27,639	21.03%	1
Social Democratic Centre Party	CDS	6,741	5.13%	0
Unitary Democratic Coalition	CDU	5,559	4.23%	0
Democratic Renewal Party	PRD	1,832	1.39%	0
Christian Democratic Party	PDC	1,485	1.13%	0
Revolutionary Socialist Party	PSR	778	0.59%	0
Communist Party (Reconstructed)	PC(R)	752	0.57%	0
Popular Democratic Union	UDP	544	0.41%	0
People's Monarchist Party	PPM	436	0.33%	0
Portuguese Workers' Communist Party	PCTP	365	0.28%	0
Portuguese Democratic Movement	MDP	351	0.27%	0
Valid votes		131,447	100.00%	6
Blank votes		1,152	0.85%	
Rejected votes – other		3,315	2.44%	
Total polled		135,914	66.27%	
Registered electors		205,087		

The following candidates were elected: Daniel Bastos (PSD); Assunção Esteves (PSD); Carlos Lage (PS); Valente de Oliveira (PSD); Fernando Pereira (PSD); and João Teixeira (PSD).

===== 1985 =====
Results of the 1985 legislative election held on 6 October 1985:

Party		Votes	%	Seats
Social Democratic Party	PSD	55,388	43.93%	3
Socialist Party	PS	30,129	23.90%	2
Social Democratic Centre Party	CDS	16,375	12.99%	1
Democratic Renewal Party	PRD	11,350	9.00%	0
United People Alliance	APU	7,804	6.19%	0
Christian Democratic Party	PDC	1,482	1.18%	0
Popular Democratic Union	UDP	1,108	0.88%	0
Workers' Party of Socialist Unity	POUS	802	0.64%	0
Revolutionary Socialist Party	PSR	744	0.59%	0
Communist Party (Reconstructed)	PC(R)	521	0.41%	0
Portuguese Workers' Communist Party	PCTP	372	0.30%	0
Valid votes		126,075	100.00%	6
Blank votes		1,188	0.90%	
Rejected votes – other		4,037	3.07%	
Total polled		131,300	66.70%	
Registered electors		196,854		

The following candidates were elected: Amândio de Azevedo (PSD); Daniel Bastos (PSD); Aloísio Fonseca (PS); António Coimbra Martins (PS); Francisco Teixeira (CDS); and João Teixeira (PSD).

===== 1983 =====
Results of the 1983 legislative election held on 25 April 1983:

Party		Votes	%	Seats
Social Democratic Party	PSD	55,547	43.61%	3
Socialist Party	PS	42,758	33.57%	2
Social Democratic Centre Party	CDS	16,768	13.16%	1
United People Alliance	APU	7,089	5.57%	0
Christian Democratic Party	PDC	1,146	0.90%	0
People's Monarchist Party	PPM	1,093	0.86%	0
Popular Democratic Union	UDP	832	0.65%	0
Revolutionary Socialist Party	PSR	544	0.43%	0
Workers' Party of Socialist Unity	POUS	438	0.34%	0
Portuguese Marxist–Leninist Communist Organization	OCMLP	413	0.32%	0
Portuguese Workers' Communist Party	PCTP	394	0.31%	0
Socialist Workers League	LST	359	0.28%	0
Valid votes		127,381	100.00%	6
Blank votes		779	0.59%	
Rejected votes – other		4,091	3.09%	
Total polled		132,251	71.43%	
Registered electors		185,138		

The following candidates were elected: Amândio de Azevedo (PSD); Daniel Bastos (PSD); José Fillol (PS); Carlos Augusto Pires (PS); Tomás Espirito Santo (CDS); and João Teixeira (PSD).

===== 1980 =====
Results of the 1980 legislative election held on 5 October 1980:

Party		Votes	%	Seats
Democratic Alliance	AD	89,209	64.35%	5
Republican and Socialist Front	FRS	32,733	23.61%	1
United People Alliance	APU	7,374	5.32%	0
Workers' Party of Socialist Unity	POUS	2,259	1.63%	0
Portuguese Workers' Communist Party	PCTP	2,163	1.56%	0
Revolutionary Socialist Party	PSR	1,503	1.08%	0
Popular Democratic Union	UDP	1,097	0.79%	0
Labour Party	PT	987	0.71%	0
Portuguese Marxist–Leninist Communist Organization	OCMLP	740	0.53%	0
Christian Democratic Party, Independent Movement for the National Reconstruction / Party of the Portuguese Right and National Front	PDC- MIRN/ PDP- FN	564	0.41%	0
Valid votes		138,629	100.00%	6
Blank votes		816	0.57%	
Rejected votes – other		4,128	2.88%	
Total polled		143,573	80.94%	
Registered electors		177,379		

The following candidates were elected: Amândio de Azevedo (AD); Daniel Bastos (AD); Maria da Glória Duarte (AD); António Azevedo Gomes (FRS); Joaquim Pinto (AD); and Alexandre Reigoto (AD).

==== 1970s ====
===== 1979 =====
Results of the 1979 legislative election held on 2 December 1979:

Party		Votes	%	Seats
Democratic Alliance	AD	84,071	60.66%	4
Socialist Party	PS	36,184	26.11%	2
United People Alliance	APU	8,920	6.44%	0
Christian Democratic Party	PDC	2,367	1.71%	0
Popular Democratic Union	UDP	2,222	1.60%	0
Portuguese Workers' Communist Party	PCTP	1,739	1.25%	0
Left-wing Union for the Socialist Democracy	UEDS	1,563	1.13%	0
Revolutionary Socialist Party	PSR	1,130	0.82%	0
Portuguese Marxist–Leninist Communist Organization	OCMLP	402	0.29%	0
Valid votes		138,598	100.00%	6
Blank votes		1,212	0.83%	
Rejected votes – other		6,007	4.12%	
Total polled		145,817	85.03%	
Registered electors		171,488		

The following candidates were elected: Amândio de Azevedo (AD); Daniel Bastos (AD); Manuel Fontoura (AD); Júlio Montalvão Machado (PS); Chaves Medeiros (PS); and Alexandre Reigoto (AD).

===== 1976 =====
Results of the 1976 legislative election held on 25 April 1976:

Party		Votes	%	Seats
Democratic People's Party	PPD	50,736	42.10%	4
Socialist Party	PS	34,277	28.44%	2
Social Democratic Centre Party	CDS	23,808	19.76%	1
Portuguese Communist Party	PCP	4,086	3.39%	0
Popular Democratic Union	UDP	1,192	0.99%	0
People's Monarchist Party	PPM	1,079	0.90%	0
Christian Democratic Party	PDC	1,041	0.86%	0
Worker–Peasant Alliance	AOC	936	0.78%	0
Movement of Socialist Left	MES	890	0.74%	0
Internationalist Communist League	LCI	877	0.73%	0
People's Socialist Front	FSP	648	0.54%	0
Re-Organized Movement of the Party of the Proletariat	MRPP	534	0.44%	0
Communist Party of Portugal (Marxist–Leninist)	PCP(ML)	406	0.34%	0
Valid votes		120,510	100.00%	7
Rejected votes		9,623	7.39%	
Total polled		130,133	78.30%	
Registered electors		166,189		

The following candidates were elected: Amândio de Azevedo (PPD); António Barreto (PS); Manuel Fontoura (PPD); Chaves Medeiros (PS); Fernando Pinto (PPD); Alexandre Reigoto (CDS); and António Veríssimo (PPD).
