= Results breakdown of the 2009 Portuguese legislative election =

2009 Portuguese legislative election
- 27 September 2009
- All 230 seats in the Assembly of the Republic; 116 seats needed for a majority
- Turnout: 59.7%
Party	Leader	Vote %	Seats	+/–
PS	José Sócrates	36.6%	97	−24
PSD	Manuela Ferreira Leite	29.1%	81	+6
CDS–PP	Paulo Portas	10.4%	21	+9
BE	Francisco Louçã	9.8%	16	+8
CDU	Jerónimo de Sousa	7.9%	15	+1
This lists parties that won seats. See the complete results below.
Prime Minister before	Prime Minister after
José Sócrates; PS	José Sócrates; PS

This is the results breakdown of the Assembly of the Republic election held in Portugal on 27 September 2009. The following tables show detailed results in each of the country's 22 electoral constituencies.

== Electoral system ==
The Assembly of the Republic has 230 members elected to four-year terms. The number of seats to be elected by each district depends on the district magnitude. 226 seats are allocated proportionally by the number of registered voters in the 18 Districts in Mainland Portugal, plus Azores and Madeira, and 4 fixed seats are allocated for overseas voters, 2 seats for voters in Europe and another 2 seats for voters Outside Europe. The 230 members of Parliament are elected using the D'Hondt method and by a closed list proportional representation system. Members represent the country as a whole and not the constituencies in which they were elected.

== Summary ==
=== Nationwide results ===
Summary of the 27 September 2009 Assembly of the Republic elections results
Parties	Votes	%	±pp swing	MPs				
Parties	Votes	%	±pp swing	2005	2009	±	%	±
Socialist	2,077,238	36.56	▼8.4	121	97	▼24	42.17	▼10.4
Social Democratic (Note: In 2005, 2 MPT and 2 PPM members were elected in the PSD lists.)	1,653,665	29.11	▲0.3	75	81	▲6	35.22	▲2.6
People's	592,778	10.43	▲3.1	12	21	▲9	9.13	▲3.9
Left Bloc	557,306	9.81	▲3.4	8	16	▲8	6.96	▲3.5
Unitary Democratic Coalition (Note: Portuguese Communist Party (13 MPs) and "The Greens" (2 MPs).)	446,279	7.86	▲0.3	14	15	▲1	6.52	▲0.4
Portuguese Workers' Communist	52,761	0.93	▲0.1	0	0	0	0.00	0.0
Hope for Portugal Movement	25,949	0.46	—N/a	—N/a	0	—N/a	0.00	—N/a
New Democracy	21,876	0.38	▼0.3	0	0	0	0.00	0.0
Merit and Society Movement	16,924	0.30	—N/a	—N/a	0	—N/a	0.00	—N/a
People's Monarchist	15,262	0.27	—N/a	0	0	0	0.00	0.0
Ecology and Humanism Front (MPT/PH) (Note: Earth Party / Humanist Party joint electoral list only in continental Portugal.)	12,405	0.22	—N/a	—N/a	0	—N/a	0.00	—N/a
National Renovator	11,503	0.20	▲0.0	0	0	0	0.00	0.0
Portugal Pro-Life	8,461	0.15	—N/a	—N/a	0	—N/a	0.00	—N/a
Labour	4,974	0.09	—N/a	—N/a	0	—N/a	0.00	—N/a
Workers Party of Socialist Unity	4,632	0.08	▼0.0	0	0	0	0.00	0.0
Earth (Note: Earth Party electoral list only in Madeira and Azores.)	3,265	0.06	—N/a	0	0	0	0.00	0.0
Total valid	5,505,278	96.91	▼0.2	230	230	0	100.00	0.0
Blank ballots	99,086	1.74	▼0.1					
Invalid ballots	76,894	1.35	▲0.2					
Total	5,681,258	100.00						
Registered voters/turnout	9,519,921	59.68	▼4.6					
Source: Comissão Nacional de Eleições

== Results by constituency ==
=== Azores ===
Summary of the 27 September 2009 Assembly of the Republic elections results in Azores
Parties	Votes	%	±pp swing	MPs		
Parties	Votes	%	±pp swing	2009	2011	±
Socialist	37,830	39.72	▼13.4	3	3	0
Social Democratic	34,030	35.73	▲1.3	2	2	0
People's	9,798	10.29	▲6.3	0	0	0
Left Bloc	6,965	7.31	▲4.4	0	0	0
Unitary Democratic Coalition	2,072	2.18	▲0.5	0	0	0
Portuguese Workers' Communist	620	0.65	▲0.2	0	0	0
Earth	377	0.40	—N/a	—N/a	0	—N/a
People's Monarchist	312	0.33	—N/a	—N/a	0	—N/a
Hope for Portugal Movement	268	0.28	—N/a	—N/a	0	—N/a
Merit and Society Movement	152	0.16	—N/a	—N/a	0	—N/a
Portugal Pro-Life	139	0.15	—N/a	—N/a	0	—N/a
Total valid	92,563	97.18	▼0.7	5	5	0
Blank ballots	1,780	1.87	▲0.5			
Invalid ballots	906	0.95	▲0.2			
Total	95,249	100.00				
Registered voters/turnout	216,759	43.94	▼4.2			
Source: Resultados Açores

=== Aveiro ===
Summary of the 27 September 2009 Assembly of the Republic elections results in Aveiro
Parties	Votes	%	±pp swing	MPs		
Parties	Votes	%	±pp swing	2009	2011	±
Social Democratic	134,971	34.56	▼1.1	6	7	▲1
Socialist	131,787	33.75	▼7.3	8	6	▼2
People's	50,687	12.98	▲3.2	1	2	▲1
Left Bloc	35,183	9.01	▲3.9	0	1	▲1
Unitary Democratic Coalition	14,975	3.83	▲0.3	0	0	0
Portuguese Workers' Communist	2,961	0.76	▲0.2	0	0	0
Merit and Society Movement	2,529	0.65	—N/a	—N/a	0	—N/a
Hope for Portugal Movement	1,497	0.38	—N/a	—N/a	0	—N/a
People's Monarchist	1,013	0.26	—N/a	—N/a	0	—N/a
New Democracy	912	0.23	▼0.7	0	0	0
Portugal Pro-Life	756	0.19	—N/a	—N/a	0	—N/a
National Renovator	654	0.17	▼0.0	0	0	0
Ecology and Humanism Front (MPT/PH)	646	0.17	—N/a	—N/a	0	—N/a
Total valid	378,571	96.94	▼0.2	15	16	▲1
Blank ballots	7,027	1.80	▼0.1			
Invalid ballots	4,929	1.26	▲0.3			
Total	390,527	100.00				
Registered voters/turnout	643,937	60.65	▼5.3			
Source: Resultados Aveiro

=== Beja ===
Summary of the 27 September 2009 Assembly of the Republic elections results in Beja
Parties	Votes	%	±pp swing	MPs		
Parties	Votes	%	±pp swing	2009	2011	±
Socialist	28,619	34.82	▼16.2	2	2	0
Unitary Democratic Coalition	23,771	28.92	▲4.8	1	1	0
Social Democratic	12,056	14.67	▲2.4	0	0	0
Left Bloc	8,264	10.06	▲5.4	0	0	0
People's	4,696	5.71	▲2.8	0	0	0
Portuguese Workers' Communist	1,293	1.57	▼0.3	0	0	0
Ecology and Humanism Front (MPT/PH)	258	0.31	—N/a	—N/a	0	—N/a
Hope for Portugal Movement	247	0.30	—N/a	—N/a	0	—N/a
People's Monarchist	181	0.22	—N/a	—N/a	0	—N/a
Merit and Society Movement	161	0.20	—N/a	—N/a	0	—N/a
National Renovator	134	0.16	▼0.0	0	0	0
Portugal Pro-Life	128	0.16	—N/a	—N/a	0	—N/a
Workers Party of Socialist Unity	120	0.15	▼0.1	0	0	0
Total valid	79,928	97.26	▼0.5	3	3	0
Blank ballots	1,232	1.50	▲0.3			
Invalid ballots	1,023	1.24	▲0.2			
Total	82,183	100.00				
Registered voters/turnout	138,251	59.44	▼3.6			
Source: Resultados Beja

=== Braga ===
Summary of the 27 September 2009 Assembly of the Republic elections results in Braga
Parties	Votes	%	±pp swing	MPs		
Parties	Votes	%	±pp swing	2009	2011	±
Socialist	207,695	41.73	▼3.7	9	9	0
Social Democratic	153,448	30.83	▼2.1	7	6	▼1
People's	48,158	9.68	▲1.9	1	2	▲1
Left Bloc	38,898	7.82	▲3.2	0	1	▲1
Unitary Democratic Coalition	23,037	4.63	▼0.2	1	1	0
New Democracy	3,825	0.77	▼0.2	0	0	0
Portuguese Workers' Communist	3,793	0.76	▼0.0	0	0	0
Hope for Portugal Movement	1,527	0.31	—N/a	—N/a	0	—N/a
People's Monarchist	1,524	0.31	—N/a	—N/a	0	—N/a
Ecology and Humanism Front (MPT/PH)	1,206	0.24	—N/a	—N/a	0	—N/a
National Renovator	830	0.17	▲0.0	0	0	0
Merit and Society Movement	817	0.16	—N/a	—N/a	0	—N/a
Portugal Pro-Life	808	0.16	—N/a	—N/a	0	—N/a
Workers Party of Socialist Unity	382	0.08	▼0.1	0	0	0
Total valid	485,948	97.64	▼0.2	18	19	▲1
Blank ballots	6,875	1.38	▲0.0			
Invalid ballots	4,879	0.98	▲0.1			
Total	497,702	100.00				
Registered voters/turnout	762,944	65.23	▼4.6			
Source: Resultados Braga

=== Bragança ===
Summary of the 27 September 2009 Assembly of the Republic elections results in Bragança
Parties	Votes	%	±pp swing	MPs		
Parties	Votes	%	±pp swing	2009	2011	±
Social Democratic	34,122	40.63	▲1.6	2	2	0
Socialist	27,695	32.98	▼9.1	2	1	▼1
People's	10,541	12.55	▲2.9	0	0	0
Left Bloc	5,211	6.20	▲3.8	0	0	0
Unitary Democratic Coalition	2,023	2.41	▲0.4	0	0	0
Portuguese Workers' Communist	513	0.61	▲0.1	0	0	0
Hope for Portugal Movement	320	0.38	—N/a	—N/a	0	—N/a
New Democracy	303	0.36	▼0.3	0	0	0
Merit and Society Movement	195	0.23	—N/a	—N/a	0	—N/a
People's Monarchist	186	0.22	—N/a	—N/a	0	—N/a
Ecology and Humanism Front (MPT/PH)	160	0.19	—N/a	—N/a	0	—N/a
National Renovator	131	0.16	▼0.1	0	0	0
Portugal Pro-Life	104	0.12	—N/a	—N/a	0	—N/a
Total valid	81,504	97.05	▼0.1	4	3	▼1
Blank ballots	1,055	1.26	▼0.2			
Invalid ballots	1,425	1.70	▲0.3			
Total	83,984	100.00				
Registered voters/turnout	156,335	53.72	▼2.1			
Source: Resultados Bragança

=== Castelo Branco ===
Summary of the 27 September 2009 Assembly of the Republic elections results in Castelo Branco
Parties	Votes	%	±pp swing	MPs		
Parties	Votes	%	±pp swing	2009	2011	±
Socialist	48,169	41.00	▼15.0	4	2	▼2
Social Democratic	34,919	29.72	▲3.0	1	2	▲1
Left Bloc	10,668	9.08	▲5.4	0	0	0
People's	9,839	8.37	▲3.1	0	0	0
Unitary Democratic Coalition	5,932	5.05	▲1.3	0	0	0
Portuguese Workers' Communist	1,145	0.97	▲0.2	0	0	0
Merit and Society Movement	502	0.43	—N/a	—N/a	0	—N/a
Labour	400	0.34	—N/a	—N/a	0	—N/a
People's Monarchist	395	0.34	—N/a	—N/a	0	—N/a
Ecology and Humanism Front (MPT/PH)	353	0.30	—N/a	—N/a	0	—N/a
Hope for Portugal Movement	347	0.30	—N/a	—N/a	0	—N/a
National Renovator	259	0.22	0.0	0	0	0
Portugal Pro-Life	249	0.21	—N/a	—N/a	0	—N/a
Total valid	113,177	96.33	▼0.8	5	4	▼1
Blank ballots	2,015	1.72	▲0.3			
Invalid ballots	2,293	1.95	▲0.5			
Total	117,485	100.00				
Registered voters/turnout	193,761	60.63	▼5.2			
Source: Resultados Castelo Branco

=== Coimbra ===
Summary of the 27 September 2009 Assembly of the Republic elections results in Coimbra
Parties	Votes	%	±pp swing	MPs		
Parties	Votes	%	±pp swing	2009	2011	±
Socialist	89,805	37.90	▼7.5	6	4	▼2
Social Democratic	72,418	30.57	▼1.3	4	4	0
Left Bloc	25,508	10.77	▲4.5	0	1	▲1
People's	20,711	8.74	▲3.1	0	1	▲1
Unitary Democratic Coalition	13,640	5.76	▲0.3	0	0	0
Portuguese Workers' Communist	2,496	1.05	▲0.4	0	0	0
Hope for Portugal Movement	1,071	0.45	—N/a	—N/a	0	—N/a
People's Monarchist	711	0.30	—N/a	—N/a	0	—N/a
Labour	538	0.23	—N/a	—N/a	0	—N/a
Merit and Society Movement	455	0.19	—N/a	—N/a	0	—N/a
Ecology and Humanism Front (MPT/PH)	447	0.19	—N/a	—N/a	0	—N/a
National Renovator	445	0.19	▲0.1	0	0	0
Workers Party of Socialist Unity	234	0.10	▼0.1	0	0	0
Total valid	228,569	96.47	0.0	10	10	0
Blank ballots	5,346	2.26	▼0.2			
Invalid ballots	3,099	1.31	▲0.2			
Total	236,924	100.00				
Registered voters/turnout	393,881	60.15	▼4.5			
Source: Resultados Coimbra

=== Évora ===
Summary of the 27 September 2009 Assembly of the Republic elections results in Évora
Parties	Votes	%	±pp swing	MPs		
Parties	Votes	%	±pp swing	2009	2011	±
Socialist	32,016	35.01	▼14.7	2	1	▼1
Unitary Democratic Coalition	20,413	22.32	▲1.4	1	1	0
Social Democratic	17,361	18.99	▲2.3	0	1	▲1
Left Bloc	10,167	11.12	▲6.5	0	0	0
People's	5,858	6.41	▲2.7	0	0	0
Portuguese Workers' Communist	1,908	2.09	▲0.7	0	0	0
Hope for Portugal Movement	369	0.40	—N/a	—N/a	0	—N/a
People's Monarchist	294	0.32	—N/a	—N/a	0	—N/a
Merit and Society Movement	182	0.20	—N/a	—N/a	0	—N/a
Ecology and Humanism Front (MPT/PH)	154	0.17	—N/a	—N/a	0	—N/a
National Renovator	151	0.17	▲0.1	0	0	0
New Democracy	149	0.16	▼0.2	0	0	0
Total valid	89,022	97.36	▼0.4	3	3	0
Blank ballots	1,398	1.53	▲0.1			
Invalid ballots	1,020	1.12	▲0.3			
Total	91,440	100.00				
Registered voters/turnout	147,649	61.93	▼4.2			
Source: Resultados Évora

=== Faro ===
Summary of the 27 September 2009 Assembly of the Republic elections results in Faro
Parties	Votes	%	±pp swing	MPs		
Parties	Votes	%	±pp swing	2009	2011	±
Socialist	64,271	31.86	▼17.4	6	3	▼3
Social Democratic	52,770	26.16	▲1.6	2	3	▲1
Left Bloc	31,017	15.38	▲7.7	0	1	▲1
People's	21,596	10.71	▲4.9	0	1	▲1
Unitary Democratic Coalition	15,638	7.75	▲0.8	0	0	0
Portuguese Workers' Communist	2,807	1.39	▲0.5	0	0	0
Hope for Portugal Movement	945	0.47	—N/a	—N/a	0	—N/a
People's Monarchist	911	0.45	—N/a	—N/a	0	—N/a
National Renovator	877	0.43	▲0.2	0	0	0
New Democracy	876	0.43	▼0.4	0	0	0
Portugal Pro-Life	868	0.43	—N/a	—N/a	0	—N/a
Ecology and Humanism Front (MPT/PH)	763	0.38	—N/a	—N/a	0	—N/a
Merit and Society Movement	585	0.29	—N/a	—N/a	0	—N/a
Workers Party of Socialist Unity	383	0.19	—N/a	—N/a	0	—N/a
Total valid	194,307	96.33	▼0.3	8	8	0
Blank ballots	4,649	2.30	▲0.2			
Invalid ballots	2,754	1.37	▲0.1			
Total	201,710	100.00				
Registered voters/turnout	351,874	57.32	▼4.3			
Source: Resultados Faro

=== Guarda ===
Summary of the 27 September 2009 Assembly of the Republic elections results in Guarda
Parties	Votes	%	±pp swing	MPs		
Parties	Votes	%	±pp swing	2009	2011	±
Socialist	36,825	35.97	▼10.7	2	2	0
Social Democratic	36,419	35.57	▲1.0	2	2	0
People's	11,433	11.17	▲4.3	0	0	0
Left Bloc	7,730	7.55	▲4.1	0	0	0
Unitary Democratic Coalition	3,358	3.28	▲0.4	0	0	0
Portuguese Workers' Communist	1,095	1.07	▲0.4	0	0	0
New Democracy	517	0.50	▼0.2	0	0	0
People's Monarchist	331	0.32	—N/a	—N/a	0	—N/a
Labour	329	0.32	—N/a	—N/a	0	—N/a
Portugal Pro-Life	297	0.29	—N/a	—N/a	0	—N/a
Hope for Portugal Movement	293	0.29	—N/a	—N/a	0	—N/a
Ecology and Humanism Front (MPT/PH)	292	0.29	—N/a	—N/a	0	—N/a
Merit and Society Movement	198	0.19	—N/a	—N/a	0	—N/a
Total valid	99,117	96.81	▲0.2	4	4	0
Blank ballots	1,472	1.44	▼0.4			
Invalid ballots	1,791	1.75	▲0.2			
Total	102,380	100.00				
Registered voters/turnout	175,522	58.33	▼2.0			
Source: Resultados Guarda

=== Leiria ===
Summary of the 27 September 2009 Assembly of the Republic elections results in Leiria
Parties	Votes	%	±pp swing	MPs		
Parties	Votes	%	±pp swing	2009	2011	±
Social Democratic	86,595	34.97	▼4.8	5	4	▼1
Socialist	74,712	30.18	▼5.4	4	4	0
People's	31,260	12.63	▲3.8	1	1	0
Left Bloc	23,519	9.50	▲4.0	0	1	▲1
Unitary Democratic Coalition	12,645	5.11	▲0.5	0	0	0
Portuguese Workers' Communist	1,947	0.79	▲0.2	0	0	0
Hope for Portugal Movement	1,197	0.48	—N/a	—N/a	0	—N/a
Merit and Society Movement	907	0.37	—N/a	—N/a	0	—N/a
New Democracy	753	0.30	▼0.5	0	0	0
People's Monarchist	703	0.28	—N/a	—N/a	0	—N/a
Portugal Pro-Life	632	0.26	—N/a	—N/a	0	—N/a
Ecology and Humanism Front (MPT/PH)	624	0.25	—N/a	—N/a	0	—N/a
Labour	495	0.20	—N/a	—N/a	0	—N/a
National Renovator	443	0.18	▼0.0	0	0	0
Workers Party of Socialist Unity	409	0.17	▼0.0	0	0	0
Total valid	236,841	95.66	▼0.7	10	10	0
Blank ballots	6,969	2.81	▲0.5			
Invalid ballots	3,783	1.53	▲0.3			
Total	247,593	100.00				
Registered voters/turnout	421,010	58.81	▼6.0			
Source: Resultados Leiria

=== Lisbon ===
Summary of the 27 September 2009 Assembly of the Republic elections results in Lisbon
Parties	Votes	%	±pp swing	MPs		
Parties	Votes	%	±pp swing	2009	2011	±
Socialist	417,542	36.35	▼7.8	23	19	▼4
Social Democratic	288,554	25.12	▲1.5	12	13	▲1
People's	126,088	10.98	▲2.8	4	5	▲1
Left Bloc	124,244	10.81	▲2.0	4	5	▲1
Unitary Democratic Coalition	114,119	9.93	▲0.2	5	5	0
Portuguese Workers' Communist	10,001	0.87	▼0.0	0	0	0
Hope for Portugal Movement	8,974	0.78	—N/a	—N/a	0	—N/a
National Renovator	4,542	0.40	▲0.2	0	0	0
Merit and Society Movement	4,468	0.39	—N/a	—N/a	0	—N/a
New Democracy	4,013	0.35	▼0.3	0	0	0
People's Monarchist	3,218	0.28	—N/a	—N/a	0	—N/a
Ecology and Humanism Front (MPT/PH)	2,982	0.26	—N/a	—N/a	0	—N/a
Labour	1,726	0.15	—N/a	—N/a	0	—N/a
Workers Party of Socialist Unity	849	0.07	▼0.0	0	0	0
Total valid	1,111,320	96.74	▼0.1	48	47	▼1
Blank ballots	21,858	1.90	▼0.3			
Invalid ballots	15,651	1.36	▲0.2			
Total	1,148,829	100.00				
Registered voters/turnout	1,856,903	61.87	▼4.2			
Source: Resultados Lisboa

=== Madeira ===
Summary of the 27 September 2009 Assembly of the Republic elections results in Madeira
Parties	Votes	%	±pp swing	MPs		
Parties	Votes	%	±pp swing	2009	2011	±
Social Democratic	66,194	48.16	▲3.0	3	4	▲1
Socialist	26,822	19.51	▼15.5	3	1	▼2
People's	15,244	11.09	▲4.6	0	1	▲1
Left Bloc	8,446	6.14	▲2.4	0	0	0
Unitary Democratic Coalition	5,701	4.15	▲0.5	0	0	0
New Democracy	4,735	3.44	▲2.1	0	0	0
Earth	2,863	2.08	—N/a	—N/a	0	—N/a
Portuguese Workers' Communist	1,458	1.06	▼0.1	0	0	0
People's Monarchist	722	0.53	—N/a	—N/a	0	—N/a
Hope for Portugal Movement	573	0.42	—N/a	—N/a	0	—N/a
National Renovator	485	0.35	—N/a	—N/a	0	—N/a
Merit and Society Movement	335	0.24	—N/a	—N/a	0	—N/a
Total valid	133,578	97.19	▼0.0	6	6	0
Blank ballots	1,554	1.13	▲0.0			
Invalid ballots	2,314	1.68	▲0.0			
Total	137,446	100.00				
Registered voters/turnout	252,099	54.52	▼6.8			
Source: Resultados Madeira

=== Portalegre ===
Summary of the 27 September 2009 Assembly of the Republic elections results in Portalegre
Parties	Votes	%	±pp swing	MPs		
Parties	Votes	%	±pp swing	2009	2011	±
Socialist	25,314	38.28	▼16.5	2	1	▼1
Social Democratic	15,763	23.84	▲3.5	0	1	▲1
Unitary Democratic Coalition	8,510	12.87	▲0.8	0	0	0
Left Bloc	7,109	10.75	▲6.2	0	0	0
People's	5,286	7.99	▲3.8	0	0	0
Portuguese Workers' Communist	1,316	1.99	▲1.1	0	0	0
People's Monarchist	178	0.27	—N/a	—N/a	0	—N/a
Hope for Portugal Movement	151	0.23	—N/a	—N/a	0	—N/a
National Renovator	151	0.23	▲0.2	0	0	0
Merit and Society Movement	151	0.23	—N/a	—N/a	0	—N/a
Ecology and Humanism Front (MPT/PH)	146	0.22	—N/a	—N/a	0	—N/a
Portugal Pro-Life	134	0.20	—N/a	—N/a	0	—N/a
Workers Party of Socialist Unity	74	0.11	—N/a	—N/a	0	—N/a
Total valid	64,283	97.22	▼0.4	2	2	0
Blank ballots	1,078	1.63	▲0.2			
Invalid ballots	761	1.15	▲0.2			
Total	66,122	100.00				
Registered voters/turnout	108,632	60.87	▼4.5			
Source: Resultados Portalegre

=== Porto ===
Summary of the 27 September 2009 Assembly of the Republic elections results in Porto
Parties	Votes	%	±pp swing	MPs		
Parties	Votes	%	±pp swing	2009	2011	±
Socialist	422,053	41.81	▼6.7	20	18	▼2
Social Democratic	294,186	29.14	▲1.3	12	12	0
People's	93,831	9.29	▲2.5	2	4	▲2
Left Bloc	92,929	9.21	▲2.5	2	3	▲1
Unitary Democratic Coalition	57,584	5.70	▲0.3	2	2	0
Portuguese Workers' Communist	7,028	0.70	▼0.1	0	0	0
Hope for Portugal Movement	3,611	0.36	—N/a	—N/a	0	—N/a
Merit and Society Movement	2,231	0.22	—N/a	—N/a	0	—N/a
Portugal Pro-Life	2,168	0.21	—N/a	—N/a	0	—N/a
New Democracy	1,808	0.18	▼0.6	0	0	0
Ecology and Humanism Front (MPT/PH)	1,762	0.17	—N/a	—N/a	0	—N/a
People's Monarchist	1,601	0.16	—N/a	—N/a	0	—N/a
National Renovator	1,362	0.13	—N/a	—N/a	0	—N/a
Workers Party of Socialist Unity	1,358	0.13	▲0.0	0	0	0
Total valid	983,512	97.43	▲0.2	38	39	▲1
Blank ballots	15,230	1.51	▼0.2			
Invalid ballots	10,746	1.06	▼0.0			
Total	1,009,488	100.00				
Registered voters/turnout	1,550,752	65.10	▼4.1			
Source: Resultados Porto

=== Santarém ===
Summary of the 27 September 2009 Assembly of the Republic elections results in Santarém
Parties	Votes	%	±pp swing	MPs		
Parties	Votes	%	±pp swing	2009	2011	±
Socialist	83,123	33.70	▼12.4	6	4	▼2
Social Democratic	66,516	26.97	▲0.6	3	3	0
Left Bloc	29,379	11.91	▲5.4	0	1	▲1
People's	27,660	11.22	▲4.3	0	1	▲1
Unitary Democratic Coalition	22,848	9.26	▲0.7	1	1	0
Portuguese Workers' Communist	3,399	1.38	▲0.5	0	0	0
Hope for Portugal Movement	960	0.39	—N/a	—N/a	0	—N/a
Labour	713	0.29	—N/a	—N/a	0	—N/a
Merit and Society Movement	642	0.26	—N/a	—N/a	0	—N/a
People's Monarchist	639	0.26	—N/a	—N/a	0	—N/a
National Renovator	590	0.24	▲0.0	0	0	0
Portugal Pro-Life	543	0.22	—N/a	—N/a	0	—N/a
New Democracy	496	0.20	▼0.5	0	0	0
Ecology and Humanism Front (MPT/PH)	480	0.17	—N/a	—N/a	0	—N/a
Workers Party of Socialist Unity	206	0.08	▼0.1	0	0	0
Total valid	238,194	96.58	▼0.2	10	10	0
Blank ballots	4,872	1.98	▼0.2			
Invalid ballots	3,557	1.44	▲0.1			
Total	246,623	100.00				
Registered voters/turnout	404,095	61.03	▼4.3			
Source: Resultados Santarém

=== Setúbal ===
Summary of the 27 September 2009 Assembly of the Republic elections results in Setúbal
Parties	Votes	%	±pp swing	MPs		
Parties	Votes	%	±pp swing	2009	2011	±
Socialist	142,626	34.00	▼9.7	8	7	▼2
Unitary Democratic Coalition	84,203	20.07	▲0.2	3	4	▲1
Social Democratic	68,740	16.39	▲0.3	3	3	0
Left Bloc	58,827	14.02	▲3.8	2	3	▲1
People's	38,378	9.15	▲4.1	1	1	0
Portuguese Workers' Communist	5,579	1.33	▲0.1	0	0	0
Hope for Portugal Movement	1,707	0.41	—N/a	—N/a	0	—N/a
People's Monarchist	1,234	0.29	—N/a	—N/a	0	—N/a
Merit and Society Movement	1,161	0.28	—N/a	—N/a	0	—N/a
New Democracy	1,084	0.26	▼0.2	0	0	0
Ecology and Humanism Front (MPT/PH)	943	0.22	—N/a	—N/a	0	—N/a
Portugal Pro-Life	732	0.17	—N/a	—N/a	0	—N/a
Labour	588	0.14	—N/a	—N/a	0	—N/a
Workers Party of Socialist Unity	305	0.07	▼0.0	0	0	0
Total valid	406,107	96.81	▼0.5	17	17	0
Blank ballots	7,308	1.74	▲0.1			
Invalid ballots	6,073	1.45	▲0.4			
Total	419,488	100.00				
Registered voters/turnout	699,006	60.01	▼4.8			
Source: Resultados Setúbal

=== Viana do Castelo ===
Summary of the 27 September 2009 Assembly of the Republic elections results in Viana do Castelo
Parties	Votes	%	±pp swing	MPs		
Parties	Votes	%	±pp swing	2009	2011	±
Socialist	51,305	36.26	▼5.7	3	3	0
Social Democratic	44,327	31.33	▼2.2	2	2	0
People's	19,246	13.60	▲2.2	1	1	0
Left Bloc	12,098	8.55	▲4.0	0	0	0
Unitary Democratic Coalition	5,939	4.19	▲0.2	0	0	0
New Democracy	1,400	0.99	▲0.2	0	0	0
Portuguese Workers' Communist	1,192	0.84	▲0.1	0	0	0
People's Monarchist	513	0.36	—N/a	—N/a	0	—N/a
Hope for Portugal Movement	399	0.28	—N/a	—N/a	0	—N/a
Portugal Pro-Life	372	0.26	—N/a	—N/a	0	—N/a
Merit and Society Movement	257	0.18	—N/a	—N/a	0	—N/a
Ecology and Humanism Front (MPT/PH)	247	0.17	—N/a	—N/a	0	—N/a
National Renovator	192	0.14	▼0.1	0	0	0
Total valid	137,482	97.17	▼0.3	6	6	0
Blank ballots	2,260	1.60	▲0.1			
Invalid ballots	1,740	1.23	▲0.2			
Total	141,482	100.00				
Registered voters/turnout	255,700	55.33	▼5.9			
Source: Resultados Viana do Castelo

=== Vila Real ===
Summary of the 27 September 2009 Assembly of the Republic elections results in Vila Real
Parties	Votes	%	±pp swing	MPs		
Parties	Votes	%	±pp swing	2009	2011	±
Social Democratic	52,006	41.10	▲0.8	2	3	▲1
Socialist	45,606	36.05	▼7.8	3	2	▼1
People's	12,761	10.09	▲3.3	0	0	0
Left Bloc	6,958	5.50	▲3.1	0	0	0
Unitary Democratic Coalition	3,621	2.86	▲0.4	0	0	0
Portuguese Workers' Communist	774	0.61	▲0.2	0	0	0
Hope for Portugal Movement	371	0.29	—N/a	—N/a	0	—N/a
People's Monarchist	333	0.26	—N/a	—N/a	0	—N/a
Merit and Society Movement	277	0.22	—N/a	—N/a	0	—N/a
Ecology and Humanism Front (MPT/PH)	261	0.21	—N/a	—N/a	0	—N/a
Portugal Pro-Life	204	0.16	—N/a	—N/a	0	—N/a
Total valid	123,172	97.35	▼0.0	5	5	0
Blank ballots	1,589	1.26	▼0.1			
Invalid ballots	1,759	1.39	▲0.1			
Total	126,520	100.00				
Registered voters/turnout	236,322	53.54	▼3.7			
Source: Resultados Vila Real

=== Viseu ===
Summary of the 27 September 2009 Assembly of the Republic elections results in Viseu
Parties	Votes	%	±pp swing	MPs		
Parties	Votes	%	±pp swing	2009	2011	±
Social Democratic	80,676	37.47	▼2.7	4	4	0
Socialist	74,745	34.71	▼5.7	4	4	0
People's	28,867	13.41	▲4.8	1	1	0
Left Bloc	13,971	6.49	▲3.2	0	0	0
Unitary Democratic Coalition	6,148	2.86	▲0.7	0	0	0
Portuguese Workers' Communist	1,307	0.61	▲0.1	0	0	0
New Democracy	509	0.24	▼0.5	0	0	0
Hope for Portugal Movement	508	0.24	—N/a	—N/a	0	—N/a
Merit and Society Movement	375	0.17	—N/a	—N/a	0	—N/a
National Renovator	368	0.17	▼0.0	0	0	0
Portugal Pro-Life	351	0.16	—N/a	—N/a	0	—N/a
Ecology and Humanism Front (MPT/PH)	301	0.14	—N/a	—N/a	0	—N/a
Total valid	208,126	96.66	▼0.0	9	9	0
Blank ballots	3,424	1.59	▼0.4			
Invalid ballots	3,770	1.75	▲0.4			
Total	215,320	100.00				
Registered voters/turnout	381,883	56.38	▼4.2			
Source: Resultados Viseu

=== Europe ===
Summary of the 27 September 2009 Assembly of the Republic elections results in Europe
Parties	Votes	%	±pp swing	MPs		
Parties	Votes	%	±pp swing	2009	2011	±
Socialist	7,219	43.02	▼10.3	1	1	0
Social Democratic	3,970	23.66	▼3.0	1	1	0
Left Bloc	794	4.73	▲2.4	0	0	0
People's	785	4.68	▲1.3	0	0	0
Unitary Democratic Coalition	732	4.36	▲0.3	0	0	0
Ecology and Humanism Front (MPT/PH)	192	1.14	—N/a	—N/a	0	—N/a
Portuguese Workers' Communist	129	0.77	▲0.2	0	0	0
Hope for Portugal Movement	71	0.42	—N/a	—N/a	0	—N/a
People's Monarchist	48	0.29	—N/a	—N/a	0	—N/a
New Democracy	36	0.21	▼0.3	0	0	0
Merit and Society Movement	24	0.14	—N/a	—N/a	0	—N/a
Portugal Pro-Life	11	0.07	—N/a	—N/a	0	—N/a
Total valid	14,011	83.50	▼7.7	2	2	0
Blank ballots	117	0.70	▲0.3			
Invalid ballots	2,651	15.80	▲7.4			
Total	16,779	100.00				
Registered voters/turnout	72,536	23.13	▼7.8			
Source: Resultados Europa

=== Outside Europe ===
Summary of the 27 September 2009 Assembly of the Republic elections results in Outside Europe
Parties	Votes	%	±pp swing	MPs		
Parties	Votes	%	±pp swing	2009	2011	±
Social Democratic	4,736	54.48	▼3.9	2	2	0
Socialist	1,916	22.04	▼4.6	0	0	0
People's	274	3.15	▼0.4	0	0	0
Left Bloc	177	2.04	▲1.0	0	0	0
Ecology and Humanism Front (MPT/PH)	90	1.04	—N/a	—N/a	0	—N/a
Unitary Democratic Coalition	90	1.04	▲0.3	0	0	0
Hope for Portugal Movement	69	0.79	—N/a	—N/a	0	—N/a
New Democracy	60	0.69	▼0.0	0	0	0
People's Monarchist	43	0.49	—N/a	—N/a	0	—N/a
Portugal Pro-Life	37	0.43	—N/a	—N/a	0	—N/a
Portuguese Workers' Communist	23	0.26	▲0.1	0	0	0
National Renovator	14	0.16	▼0.0	0	0	0
Merit and Society Movement	12	0.14	—N/a	—N/a	0	—N/a
Total valid	7,541	86.75	▼4.9	2	2	0
Blank ballots	53	0.61	▲0.4			
Invalid ballots	1,099	12.64	▲4.5			
Total	8,693	100.00				
Registered voters/turnout	94,471	9.20	▼9.1			
Source: Resultados Fora da Europa
