= 2009 Portuguese legislative election =

- 27 September 2009

All 230 seats in the Assembly of the Republic 116 seats needed for a majority
- Opinion polls
- Registered: 9,519,921 ▲6.4%
- Turnout: 5,681,258 (59.7%) ▼4.6 pp
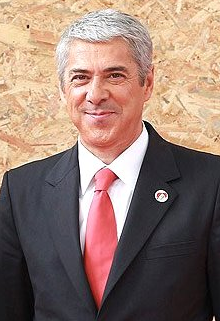

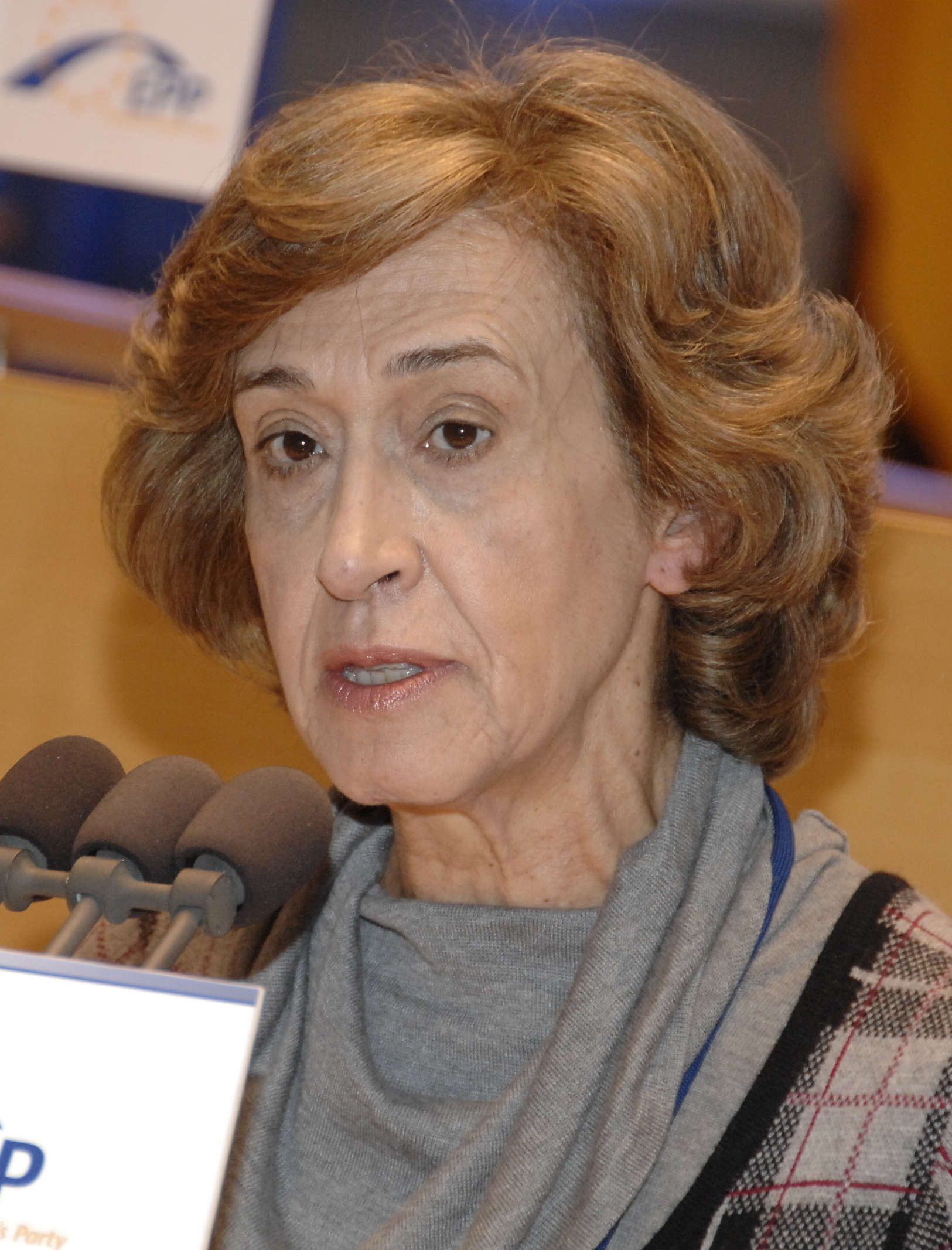

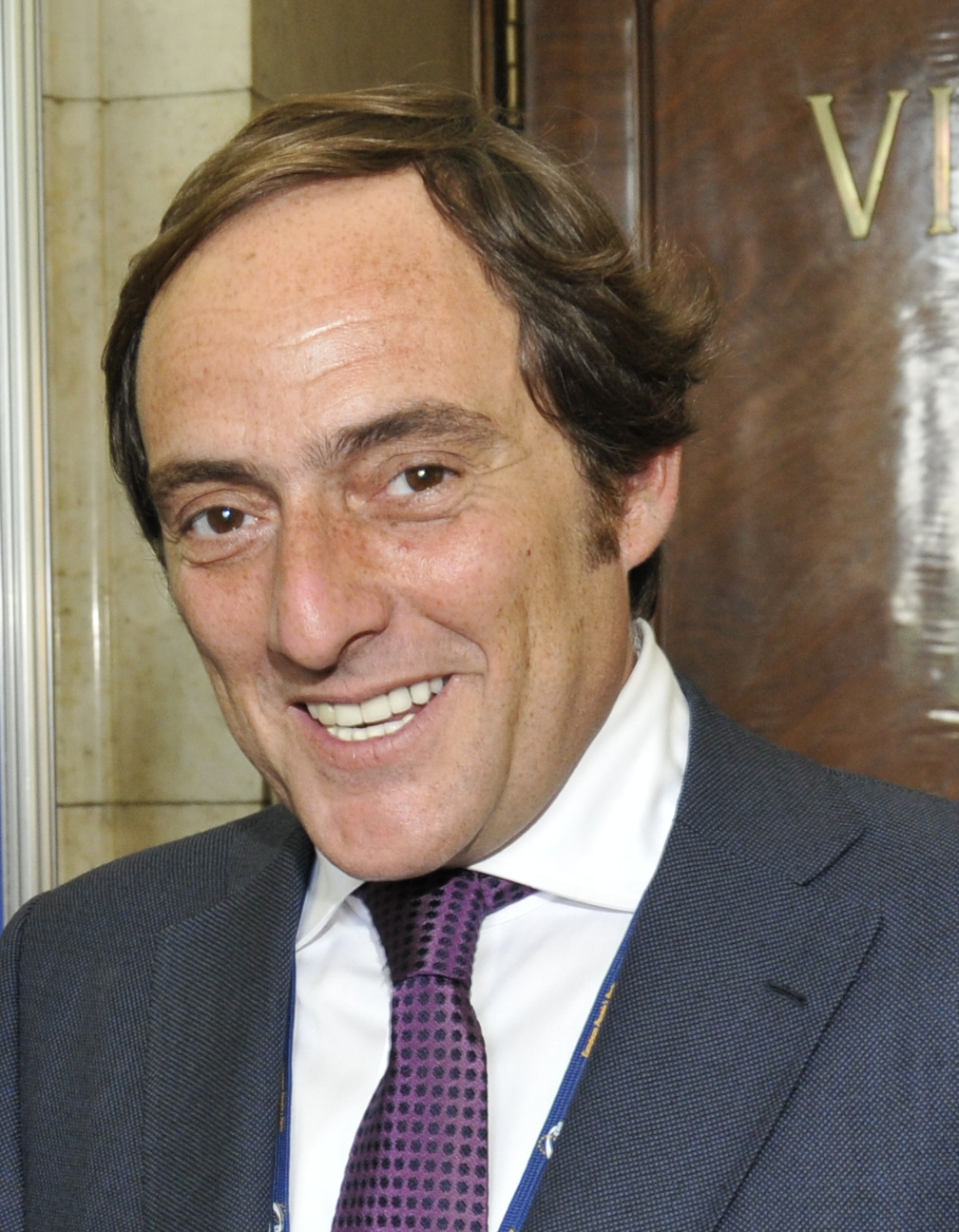

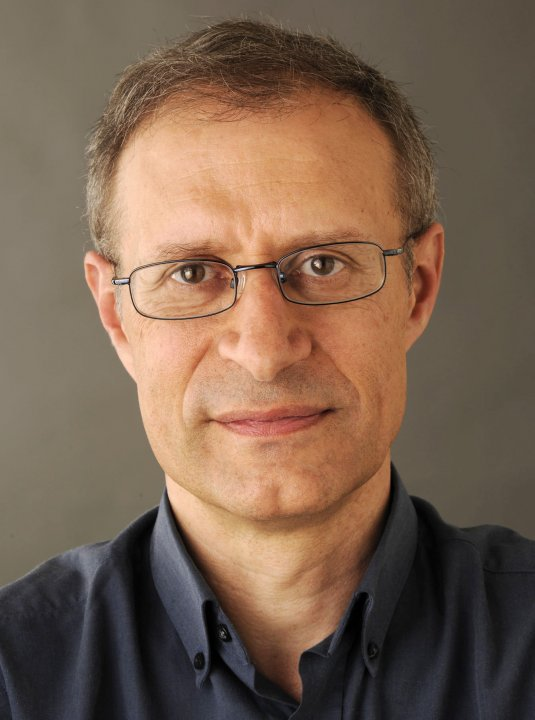

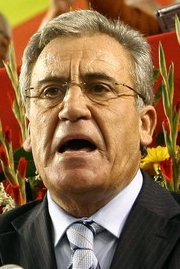
	First party	Second party	Third party
Leader	José Sócrates	Manuela Ferreira Leite	Paulo Portas
Party	PS	PSD	CDS–PP
Leader since	26 September 2004	31 May 2008	21 April 2007
Leader's seat	Castelo Branco	Lisbon	Aveiro
Last election	121 seats, 45.0%	75 seats, 28.8%	12 seats, 7.2%
Seats won	97	81	21
Seat change	▼24	▲6	▲9
Popular vote	2,077,238	1,653,665	592,778
Percentage	36.6%	29.1%	10.4%
Swing	▼8.4 pp	▲0.3 pp	▲3.2 pp
	Fourth party	Fifth party
Leader	Francisco Louçã	Jerónimo de Sousa
Party	BE	PCP
Alliance		CDU
Leader since	24 March 1999	27 November 2004
Leader's seat	Lisbon	Lisbon
Last election	8 seats, 6.4%	14 seats, 7.5%
Seats won	16	15
Seat change	▲8	▲1
Popular vote	557,306	446,279
Percentage	9.8%	7.9%
Swing	▲3.4 pp	▲0.3 pp
Prime Minister before election
José Sócrates
PS
Prime Minister after election
José Sócrates
PS

The 2009 Portuguese legislative election was held on 27 September, to renew all 230 members of the Assembly of the Republic. The election took place during the regular term of the previous four-year legislative period, following four years under a majority government of the Socialist Party (PS). A total of 13 parties and two coalitions competed in this election.

For the first, and so far only, time in legislative elections in Portugal, one of the candidates from the two main parties for the position of prime minister was a woman. The Socialist Party, led by then-prime minister José Sócrates, won the largest number of votes and seats, but failed to repeat the overall majority it obtained in 2005. Despite polling first at 36.6%, the Socialists lost 8 percent of the vote and 24 seats, but still maintained a clear advantage over the conservative Social Democrats, which remained stable at 29%, while the CDS – People's Party and the Left Bloc made strong gains. The communist-led alliance, the Unitary Democratic Coalition (CDU), made minor gains but dropped from third to fifth place.

On 12 October, José Sócrates was invited by President Aníbal Cavaco Silva to form a government. The new cabinet, a minority one, was announced on 22 October and sworn in on 26 October. Due to the sharp increase in registered voters, voter turnout fell considerably, with 59.7% of the electorate casting their ballots, although the number of votes cast was only slightly lower than in 2005.

== Background ==
In the February 2005 early election, the Socialists, under the leadership of José Sócrates, won 45 percent of the votes and 121 MPs, the first time ever the Socialists won an absolute majority, whereas the PSD suffered a heavy defeat, achieving their worst results since 1983, and faced with this failure, the then PSD leader and outgoing Prime Minister, Pedro Santana Lopes, resigned from the leadership.

During the first months in his government, Sócrates raised taxes to reduce the deficit and initiated a policy of strict fiscal control. At the same time, he faced a very harsh summer with severe wildfires across the country. That same October, the Socialists suffered a heavy defeat in the 2005 local elections, winning just 108 cities, a drop of four, against the PSD's 158 mayoral holds, with the party unable to regain control of Lisbon and Porto. In January 2006, a new president was elected, with Aníbal Cavaco Silva, prime pinister between 1985 and 1995, becoming the first center-right candidate to win a presidential election, although only just. The PS candidate, former prime minister and president Mário Soares, polled a disappointing third place with just 14% of the votes. In 2007, a referendum for the legalization of abortion was held. After the failure of the 1998 referendum, the Yes side prevailed winning 59 percent of the votes against the No's 41 percent, making abortion legal in Portugal.

While the deficit reduction had been successful, and with the economy growing around 2 percent of GDP by 2007, the government faced heavy opposition for its policies, particularly from teachers unions. In March 2008, more than 100,000 teachers protested in Lisbon against Sócrates and his Education minister, Maria de Lurdes Rodrigues.

José Sócrates four-year term was also marred by a series of corruption and sleaze accusations against the Prime Minister himself, with the two main cases being the Independent affair and the Freeport affair. In the first, Sócrates was accused of obtaining his degree in engineering by irregular means from the Independente University, with this case, plus further irregularities, leading to the closure of the university. Several years later, the Public Prosecution office ruled that Sócrates indeed obtained his degree illegally. In the second case, the Freeport affair, Sócrates was accused, as environment minister (1999–2002), of allegedly ignoring environmental restrictions, due to interventions from members of his own family, in order to allow the construction of a shopping mall in Alcochete by the British company Freeport. Regarding this case, the end of a primetime evening news show on TVI network, anchored by Manuela Moura Guedes, also led to accusations of pressure from Sócrates and the PS to end the evening news show, as it had several reports on the Freeport affair and an unfavorable coverage towards the Prime Minister. The Freeport affair was ultimately closed due to lack of evidence.

Entering 2009, Portugal was strongly affected by the 2008 financial crisis and entered in a recession, alongside the government facing problems in the banking sector, with the collapse of BPP and the bailout and nationalization of BPN, a bank with figures close to President Cavaco Silva. As a result, the government adopted stimulus measures that worsened public finances, increasing the deficit and the national debt. In the European elections of June 2009, the PSD defied expectations by winning a European election for the first time since 1989, with 31.7 percent of the votes, while the Socialists suffered a huge defeat, obtaining just 26.5 percent of the votes, a drop of 18 points.

=== Leadership changes and challenges ===
==== Social Democratic Party ====
Following Santana Lopes exit from the leadership, in the party's congress in April 2005, Luís Marques Mendes became party leader winning 56 percent of the delegates, against the 44 percent of his rival, Luís Filipe Menezes. The results were the following:

Ballot: 9 April 2005
Candidate	Votes	%
Luís Marques Mendes	497	56.6
Luís Filipe Menezes	381	43.4
Turnout	878	

By 2007, party leader Luís Marques Mendes was being very criticized for his opposition strategy and was left further weakened after the party's disappointing result in the 2007 Lisbon mayoral by-election, where the PSD polled 3rd with less than 16 percent of the votes. Marques Mendes called a snap leadership election and was challenged by his rival in the 2005 PSD congress, Luís Filipe Menezes. Menezes easily defeated Marques Mendes. The results were the following:

Ballot: 28 September 2007
Candidate	Votes	%
Luís Filipe Menezes	21,101	53.6
Luís Marques Mendes	16,973	43.1
Blank/Invalid ballots	1,279	3.3
Turnout	39,353	62.42

By the spring of 2008, PSD leader, Luís Filipe Menezes, who had been elected in September 2007, resigned after just 6 months in the job. In the following leadership election, held in May 2008, Manuela Ferreira Leite became the first woman to lead a major party in Portugal, winning 38 percent of the votes, against the 31 percent of Pedro Passos Coelho and the 30 percent of Pedro Santana Lopes. The results were the following:

Ballot: 31 May 2008
Candidate	Votes	%
Manuela Ferreira Leite	17,278	37.9
Pedro Passos Coelho	14,160	31.1
Pedro Santana Lopes	13,495	29.6
Patinha Antão	308	0.7
Blank/Invalid ballots	351	0.8
Turnout	45,592	59.13

==== CDS – People's Party ====
Party leader Paulo Portas resigned from the leadership following the disappointing result of the party in the 2005 elections, saying that "in no civilized country in the world, the difference between Trotskyists and Christian Democrats is one percent", referring to the result of the BE. A snap leadership congress was called to elect a new leader. Two candidates were in the ballot: Telmo Correia, the preferred candidate of Paulo Portas, and José Ribeiro e Castro, more critical of Portas. Ribeiro e Castro was easily elected and the results were the following:

Ballot: 24 April 2005
Candidate	Votes	%
José Ribeiro e Castro	492	56.0
Telmo Correia	387	44.0
Turnout	879	

In April 2007, former CDS–PP leader Paulo Portas challenged the then party leader, José Ribeiro e Castro, for the leadership and was elected for his former job by a landslide. The results were the following:

Ballot: 21 April 2007
Candidate	Votes	%
Paulo Portas	5,642	74.6
José Ribeiro e Castro	1,883	24.9
Blank/Invalid ballots	38	0.5
Turnout	7,563	

=== Electoral system ===
Official logo of the election.

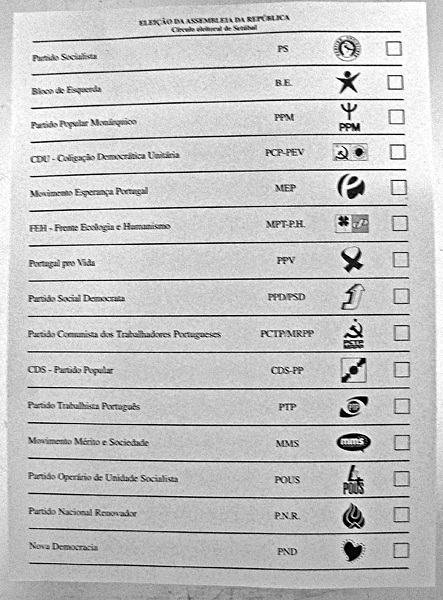
Ballot for the district of Setúbal.

The Assembly of the Republic has 230 members elected to four-year terms. Governments do not require absolute majority support of the Assembly to hold office, as even if the number of opposers of government is larger than that of the supporters, the number of opposers still needs to be equal or greater than 116 (absolute majority) for both the Government's Programme to be rejected or for a motion of no confidence to be approved.

The number of seats assigned to each district depends on the district magnitude. The use of the d'Hondt method makes for a higher effective threshold than certain other allocation methods such as the Hare quota or Sainte-Laguë method, which are more generous to small parties. Changes to the electoral registration system, approved in 2008, which made registration automatic based on each voter's Identity card, led to a significant increase in the number of registered voters, from 8,9 million in 2005 to 9,5 million in 2009.

For these elections, and compared with the 2005 elections, the MPs distributed by districts were the following:

District	Number of MPs	Map
Lisbon^{(–1)}	47	
Porto^{(+1)}	39	
Braga^{(+1)}	19	
Setúbal	17	
Aveiro^{(+1)}	16	
Leiria, Santarém and Coimbra	10	
Viseu	9	
Faro	8	
Madeira and Viana do Castelo	6	
Azores and Vila Real	5	
Castelo Branco^{(–1)} and Guarda	4	
Beja, Bragança^{(–1)} and Évora	3	
Portalegre, Europe and Outside Europe	2	

== Parties ==
Once more, the possibility of a joint PSD/CDS–PP coalition was touched upon, but it was quickly rejected by the Social Democrats (PSD). The table below lists the parties represented in the Assembly of the Republic during the 10th legislature (2005–2009) and that also partook in the election:

Name		Ideology	Political position	Leader	2005 result		Seats at dissolution
Name		Ideology	Political position	Leader	%	Seats	Seats at dissolution
PS	Socialist Party; Partido Socialista	Social democracy Third Way	Centre-left to Centre	José Sócrates	45.0%	121 / 230	121 / 230
PPD/PSD	Social Democratic Party; Partido Social Democrata	Conservatism; Classical liberalism	Centre-right	Manuela Ferreira Leite	28.8%	75 / 230	75 / 230
PCP	Portuguese Communist Party; Partido Comunista Português	Communism; Marxism–Leninism	Far-left	Jerónimo de Sousa	7.5% (Note: The Portuguese Communist Party (PCP) and the Ecologist Party "The Greens" (PEV) contested the 2005 election in a coalition called Unitary Democratic Coalition (CDU) and won a combined 7.5% of the vote and elected 14 MPs to parliament.)	12 / 230	11 / 230
PEV	Ecologist Party "The Greens"; Partido Ecologista "Os Verdes"	Eco-socialism; Green politics	Left-wing	Heloísa Apolónia	7.5%	2 / 230	2 / 230
CDS–PP	CDS – People's Party; Centro Democrático e Social - Partido Popular	Christian democracy Conservatism	Centre-right to right-wing	Paulo Portas	7.2%	12 / 230	11 / 230
BE	Left Bloc; Bloco de Esquerda	Democratic socialism Anti-capitalism	Left-wing	Francisco Louçã	6.4%	8 / 230	8 / 230
Ind.	Independent; Independente	Luísa Mesquita (expelled from the Portuguese Communist Party caucus); José Paulo Carvalho (left the CDS – People's Party caucus)					2 / 230

=== Seat changes ===
- On 24 October 2007, the Portuguese Communist Party removed their confidence in MP Luísa Mesquita, and one month later, she was expelled from the party. The party had asked her to leave her seat in 2006, something she refused, and a rift between her and the party's central committee was created. She decided to remain as an Independent MP.
- On 17 December 2008, CDS – People's Party MP José Paulo Carvalho announced he was leaving the party, citing "lack of strategy" in the party and an "abdication of the party's fundamental ideas and values". He remained in Parliament as an Independent MP.

== Campaign period ==
=== Issues ===
The campaign focused on the impact of the 2008 financial crisis, the construction of new infrastructure projects, including the Lisbon-Madrid and Lisbon-Porto-Vigo high-speed rail links, as well as the new Lisbon airport, and accusations of "democratic asphyxiation" by the right-wing opposition against the PS government, ranging from concentration of power to interference in the media. During the campaign, an alleged wiretapping case also broke, in which advisors to President Aníbal Cavaco Silva suspected that they were being monitored by the government. On the left-wing, mainly from the Left Bloc (BE), Sócrates' educational policies and his government's response to the economic crisis were the main points of attack. Opinion polls conducted at the start of the official election campaign period, on 12 September 2009, showed a too close to call race between the Socialists and the conservative Social Democrats, but a few days before the election, the Socialists increased their lead over the Social Democrats.

=== Party slogans ===
Party or alliance	Original slogan	English translation	Refs
PS	« Avançar Portugal »	"Go forward Portugal"	
PSD	« Compromisso de verdade »	"Real commitment"	
CDU	« Soluções para uma vida melhor »	"Solutions for a better life"	
CDS–PP	« Não basta pensar. É preciso votar. »	"Thinking is not enough. You need to vote."	
BE	« Estamos prontos »	"We are ready"	

=== Candidates' debates ===
2009 Portuguese legislative election debates
Date	Organisers	Moderator(s)	P Present A Absent invitee N Non-invitee					
Date	Organisers	Moderator(s)	PS Sócrates	PSD Leite	CDU Jerónimo	CDS–PP Portas	BE Louçã	Refs
2 Sep	TVI	Constança Cunha e Sá	P	N	N	P	N	
3 Sep	SIC	Clara de Sousa	N	N	P	N	P	
5 Sep	RTP1	Júdite de Sousa	P	N	P	N	N	
6 Sep	TVI	Constança Cunha e Sá	N	P	N	N	P	
7 Sep	SIC	Clara de Sousa	N	N	P	P	N	
8 Sep	RTP1	Júdite de Sousa	P	N	N	N	P	
9 Sep	TVI	Constança Cunha e Sá	N	P	P	N	N	
10 May	RTP1	Júdite de Sousa	N	P	N	P	N	
11 Sep	RTP1	Júdite de Sousa	N	N	N	P	P	
12 Sep	SIC	Clara de Sousa	P	P	N	N	N	
Candidate viewed as "most convincing" in each debate
Date	Organisers	Polling firm/Link						
Date	Organisers	Polling firm/Link	PS	PSD	CDU	CDS–PP	BE	Notes
12 Sep	SIC	Aximage	45.6	30.2	—N/a	—N/a	—N/a	24.2% Neither/Tie

== Opinion polling ==
View source data.

== Voter turnout ==
The table below shows voter turnout throughout election day including voters from Overseas.

Turnout	Time								
Turnout	12:00			16:00			19:00		
Turnout	2005	2009	±	2005	2009	±	2005	2009	±
Total	21.93%	21.29%	▼0.64 pp	50.94%	43.30%	▼7.64 pp	64.26%	59.68%	▼4.58 pp

== Results ==
=== National summary ===
Party	Votes	%	+/–	Seats	+/–
Socialist Party	2,077,238	36.56	–8.47	97	–24
Social Democratic Party	1,653,665	29.11	+0.34	81	+10
CDS – People's Party	592,778	10.43	+3.19	21	+9
Left Bloc	557,306	9.81	+3.46	16	+8
Unitary Democratic Coalition (Note: Portuguese Communist Party (13 MPs) and "The Greens" (2 MPs).)	446,279	7.86	+0.32	15	+1
Portuguese Workers' Communist Party	52,761	0.93	+0.09	0	0
Hope for Portugal Movement	25,949	0.46	New	0	New
New Democracy Party	21,876	0.39	–0.31	0	0
Merit and Society Movement	16,924	0.30	New	0	New
People's Monarchist Party (Note: Elected in 2005 in the Social Democratic Party electoral lists.)	15,262	0.27	—	0	–2
Ecology and Humanism Front (MPT–PH) (Note: Earth Party / Humanist Party joint electoral list only in continental Portugal.)	12,405	0.22	–0.08	0	0
National Renovator Party	11,503	0.20	+0.04	0	0
Portugal Pro-Life Party	8,461	0.15	New	0	New
Portuguese Labour Party	4,974	0.09	New	0	New
Workers' Party of Socialist Unity	4,632	0.08	–0.02	0	0
Earth Party (Note: Earth Party electoral list only in Madeira and Azores.)	3,265	0.06	—	0	–2
Total	5,505,278	100.00	–	230	0
Valid votes	5,505,278	96.90	–0.16		
Invalid votes	76,894	1.35	+0.21		
Blank votes	99,086	1.74	–0.06		
Total votes	5,681,258	100.00	–		
Registered voters/turnout	9,519,921	59.68	–4.58		
Source: Comissão Nacional de Eleições

Vote share
PS	36.56%
PSD	29.11%
CDS-PP	10.43%
BE	9.81%
CDU	7.86%
PCTP/MRPP	0.93%
Others	2.21%
Blank/Invalid	3.09%

Parliamentary seats
PS	42.17%
PSD	35.22%
CDS-PP	9.13%
BE	6.96%
CDU	6.52%

=== Distribution by constituency ===
Results of the 2009 election of the Portuguese Assembly of the Republic by constituency
Constituency	%	S	%	S	%	S	%	S	%	S	Total S
Constituency	PS		PSD		CDS–PP		BE		CDU		Total S
Azores	39.7	3	35.7	2	10.3	-	7.3	-	2.2	-	5
Aveiro	33.8	6	34.6	7	13.0	2	9.0	1	3.8	-	16
Beja	34.9	2	14.6	-	5.7	-	10.0	-	29.1	1	3
Braga	41.7	9	30.8	6	9.7	2	7.8	1	4.6	1	19
Bragança	33.0	1	40.6	2	12.6	-	6.2	-	2.4	-	3
Castelo Branco	41.0	2	29.8	2	8.4	-	9.1	-	5.1	-	4
Coimbra	38.0	4	30.6	4	8.8	1	10.8	1	5.7	-	10
Évora	35.0	1	19.0	1	6.4	-	11.1	-	22.3	1	3
Faro	31.9	3	26.2	3	10.7	1	15.3	1	7.8	-	8
Guarda	36.0	2	35.6	2	11.2	-	7.6	-	3.3	-	4
Leiria	30.1	4	34.9	4	12.6	1	9.5	1	5.1	-	10
Lisbon	36.4	19	25.1	13	11.0	5	10.8	5	9.9	5	47
Madeira	19.4	1	48.1	4	11.1	1	6.2	-	4.2	-	6
Portalegre	38.3	1	23.8	1	8.0	-	10.8	-	12.9	-	2
Porto	41.8	18	29.2	12	9.3	4	9.2	3	5.7	2	39
Santarém	33.7	4	27.0	3	11.2	1	11.8	1	9.2	1	10
Setúbal	34.0	7	16.4	3	9.1	1	14.0	2	20.1	4	17
Viana do Castelo	36.3	3	31.3	2	13.6	1	8.6	-	4.2	-	6
Vila Real	36.1	2	41.1	3	10.1	-	5.5	-	2.9	-	5
Viseu	34.7	4	37.5	4	13.4	1	6.5	-	2.9	-	9
Europe	43.3	1	23.8	1	4.7	-	4.7	-	4.4	-	2
Outside Europe	22.0	-	54.5	2	3.2	-	2.0	-	1.0	-	2
Total	36.6	97	29.1	81	10.4	21	9.8	16	7.9	15	230
Source: Comissão Nacional de Eleições

=== Maps ===
Winner and seats by constituency.

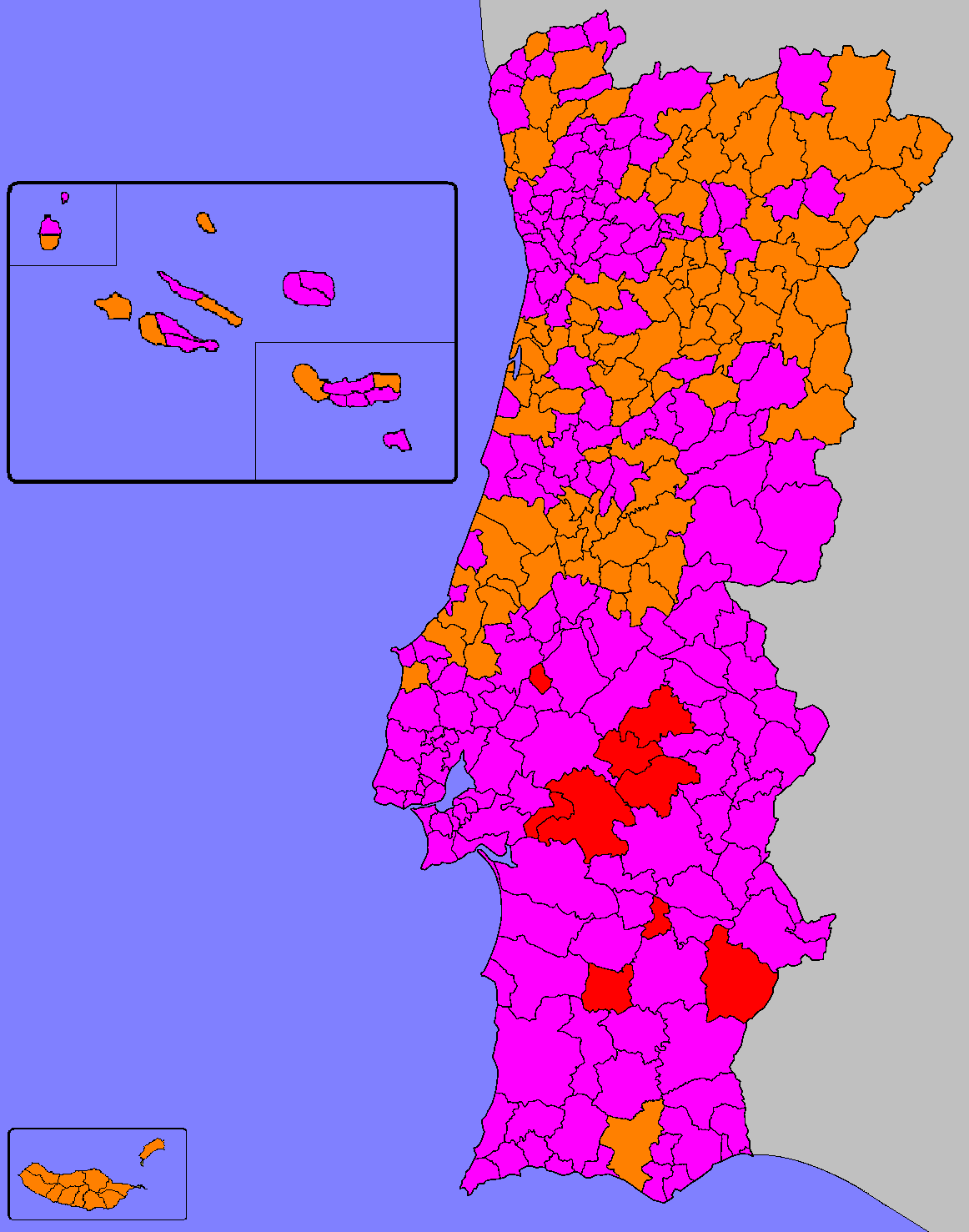
Most voted political force by municipality.

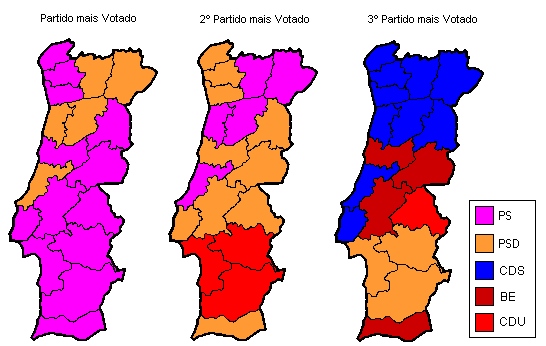
First, second and third most voted political force by district.

Most voted political force by district or autonomous region.

== Aftermath ==
=== Fall of the government ===
By 2010, Portugal was facing a big economic crisis and the government was forced to implement austerity measures. Plus, Sócrates himself was also implicated in a new corruption investigation, Face Oculta, although no accusation was made. Despite the government's announcement of more fiscal restraint policies in order to control public spending, the economy entered in a recession and protests against the government policies began. On 12 March 2011, protests against the government's austerity measures drew up to 280,000 people just in the streets of Lisbon and Porto alone. By March 2011, the PS government had presented three Stability and Growth Pacts (PEC) and all failed in controlling spending and convincing markets. A forth one, PEC IV, was put for a vote in Parliament on 23 March 2011 but it was rejected by all opposition parties and only supported by the Socialists.

2011 PEC IV; José Sócrates (PS)
Ballot →	23 March 2011
Required majority →	Simple
Yes: • PS (97)	97 / 230
No: • PSD (80); • CDS–PP (21); • BE (16); • PCP (13); • PEV (2)	132 / 230
Abstentions	0 / 230
Absentees: • PSD (1)	1 / 230
Result →	Rejected

Before the vote, Prime Minister José Sócrates threatened to resign if the PEC failed to pass. After the result of the vote was announced, Sócrates tendered his resignation to President Aníbal Cavaco Silva. A snap legislative election was then called for 5 June 2011.

== See also ==
- Politics of Portugal
- List of political parties in Portugal
- Elections in Portugal
