= Rui Marques (politician) =

Portuguese politician (born 1953)

Member of the Assembly of the Republic
- In office 27 October 1995 – 24 October 1999
- Constituency: Aveiro
- In office 19 November 1991 – 3 December 1991
- Constituency: Aveiro

Personal details
- Born: Rui Manuel Pereira Marques; 25 June 1953 (age 73)
- Party: CDS – People's Party (before 2008); Hope for Portugal Movement (2008–2012)
- Occupation: Politician
- Profession: Physician

Rui Manuel Pereira Marques (born 25 June 1953) is a Portuguese politician, physician and entrepreneur, who served as a member of the Assembly of the Republic from 1995 until 1999, as a member of the CDS – People's Party. He was also the leader of the Hope for Portugal Movement (MEP) from the party's founding in 2008 until his resignation following the 2011 legislative election.
