= Manuela Tender =

Portuguese politician

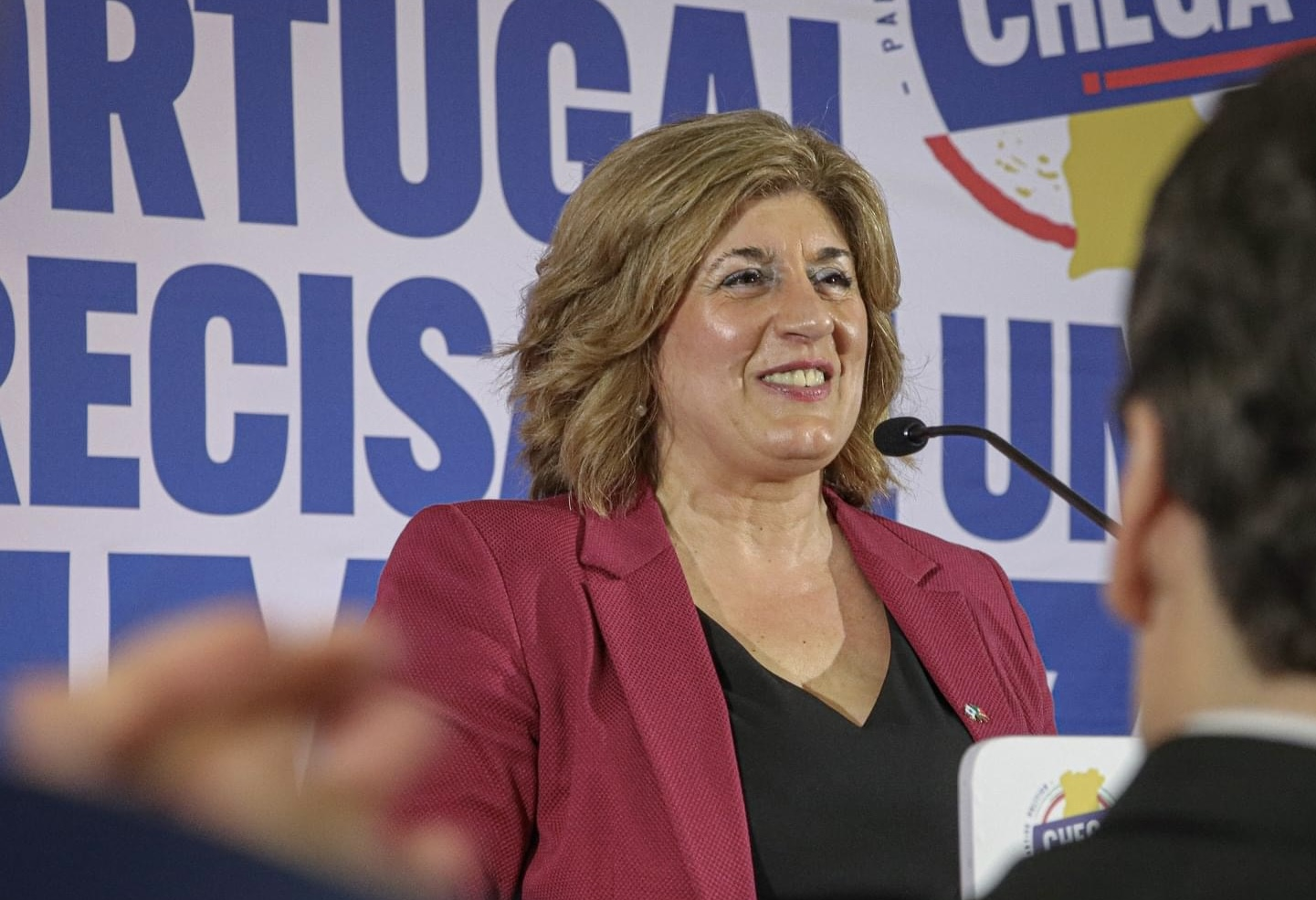
- Manuela Tender in 2024

Member of the Assembly of the Republic
- Incumbent
- Assumed office 26 March 2024
- Constituency: Vila Real
- In office 20 June 2011 – 24 October 2019
- Constituency: Vila Real

Member of the Chaves City Council
- In office 1 October 2017 – 25 September 2021

Member of the Chaves Municipal Assembly
- In office 11 October 2009 – 30 September 2017

Personal details
- Born: Maria Manuela Pereira Tender; 9 February 1971 (age 55) Valpaços, Portugal
- Party: Chega (2021–present)
- Other political affiliations: Social Democratic Party (2005–2020)
- Spouse: Adamir Dias
- Children: 2
- Education: University of Trás-os-Montes and Alto Douro
- Occupation: Teacher • politician

Maria Manuela Pereira Tender (born 9 February 1971) is a Portuguese teacher, politician and member of the Assembly of the Republic since 2024, having served previously between 2011 and 2019 as a member of the Social Democratic Party.

At the end of 2018, she was involved in the "deputies with ghost presences" controversy, and was in the news in Correio da Manhã due to the suspicions raised by the fact that she had participated as a councilor in meetings of the Chaves City Council and on the same days had scheduled presence at plenary meetings of the Assembly of the Republic, in Lisbon.

She was a member of the Chaves Municipal Assembly, between 2009 and 2017. She was also a councilor in the Chaves Municipal Council, between 2017 and 2021.

She left the PSD in January 2020, after being removed from the lists for the 2019 legislative elections. She joined the CHEGA party in 2021, being head of the list for Vila Real in the 2022 legislative elections, having not been elected. In 2024, she was announced, again, as head of the list for the Vila Real District for the 2024 legislative elections, being one of the five former and current PSD MPs running for CHEGA.
