= Opinion polling for the 2009 Portuguese legislative election =

In the run up to the 2009 Portuguese legislative election, various organisations carried out opinion polling to gauge voting intention in Portugal. Results of such polls are displayed in this article.

The date range for these opinion polls are from the previous general election, held on 20 February 2005, to the day the next election was held, on 27 September 2009.

== Nationwide polling ==
=== Graphical summary ===
View source data.

=== Polling ===
Poll results are listed in the table below in reverse chronological order, showing the most recent first. The highest percentage figure in each polling survey is displayed in bold, and the background shaded in the leading party's colour. In the instance that there is a tie, then no figure is shaded but both are displayed in bold. The lead column on the right shows the percentage-point difference between the two parties with the highest figures. Poll results use the date the survey's fieldwork was done, as opposed to the date of publication.

Exit poll

Polling firm/Link	Fieldwork date	PS	PSD	CDU	CDS–PP	BE	O	Lead
**2009 legislative election**	27 Sep 2009	**36.6**; 97	29.1; 81	7.9; 15	10.4; 21	9.8; 16	6.2; 0	**7.5**
Eurosondagem	27 Sep 2009 (21:00)	**35.4–** **37.6**; 94/102	27.1– 28.9; 74/78	7.4– 9.2; 15	9.2– 11.2; 18/20	9.7– 11.5; 17/21	–	8.3– 8.7
Eurosondagem	27 Sep 2009 (20:00)	**36.2–** **40.4**; 99/103	26.9– 30.7; 74/77	6.5– 8.7; 13/15	7.7– 9.9; 15/17	9.0– 11.2; 18/20	–	9.3– 9.7
Intercampus	27 Sep 2009	**36.0–** **40.0**; 97/111	26.3– 30.3; 69/80	6.0– 9.0; 10/15	8.6– 11.6; 16/22	8.5– 11.5; 18/22	4.6– 7.6; 0	9.7
CESOP–UCP	27 Sep 2009	**36–40**; 102/106	25–29; 69/73	7–10; 14/16	8.5– 11.5; 18/21	9–12; 20/23	–	11
Aximage	21–24 Sep 2009	**38.8**	29.1	8.4	8.6	10.0	5.1	9.7
Intercampus	21–23 Sep 2009	**38.0**	29.9	8.4	7.7	9.4	6.6	8.1
CESOP–UCP	17–22 Sep 2009	**38**; 100	30; 80	7; 13	8; 15	11; 22	6; 0	8
Marktest	18–21 Sep 2009	**40.0**	31.6	7.2	8.2	9.0	4.0	8.4
Aximage	14–17 Sep 2009	**36.1**	29.7	7.5	7.6	10.0	9.1	6.4
Eurosondagem	13–16 Sep 2009	**34.9**; 88/96	31.6; 80/87	8.4; 15	8.4; 15/17	9.6; 18/20	7.1; 0/1	3.3
Intercampus	12–15 Sep 2009	**32.9**	29.7	9.2	7.0	12.0	9.2	3.2
CESOP–UCP	11–14 Sep 2009	**38**	32	7	7	12	4	6
Eurosondagem	6–9 Sep 2009	**33.6**; 84/90	32.5; 84/90	9.4; 16/19	8.0; 14/16	9.6; 18/20	6.9; 0/1	1.1
CESOP–UCP	4–8 Sep 2009	**37**	35	8	6	11	3	2
Marktest	4–7 Sep 2009	**35.3**	32.4	6.9	5.2	16.2	4.0	2.9
Aximage	1–4 Sep 2009	**34.5**	28.9	7.8	8.1	10.4	10.3	5.6
Eurosondagem	23–28 Jul 2009	**33.0**	31.1	9.4	8.5	10.0	8.0	1.9
Marktest	14–18 Jul 2009	**35.5**	34.2	7.4	4.4	14.3	4.2	1.3
Aximage	1–6 Jul 2009	**30.5**	30.3	9.5	6.1	13.3	10.3	0.2
Eurosondagem	25–30 Jun 2009	**35.1**	33.0	9.7	7.4	9.6	5.2	2.1
Marktest	16–20 Jun 2009	34.5	**35.8**	7.7	4.4	13.1	4.5	1.3
**2009 EP election**	7 Jun 2009	26.5 (75)	**31.7** (95)	10.6 (24)	8.4 (15)	10.7 (20)	12.1 (1)	**5.2**
Intercampus	7 Jun 2009	**36.9**	31.2	10.3	6.4	13.1	2.1	5.7
Aximage	1–4 Jun 2009	**35.3**	29.8	9.0	6.5	11.5	7.9	5.5
Eurosondagem	28 May–2 Jun 2009	**39.6**	33.0	7.9	5.6	9.1	4.8	6.6
Marktest	20–22 May 2009	**36.3**	28.3	9.4	7.1	14.7	4.2	8.0
Aximage	5–7 May 2009	**37.3**	26.7	8.5	5.2	12.6	9.7	10.6
Eurosondagem	30 Apr–5 May 2009	**38.8**	30.5	9.2	6.9	9.8	4.8	8.3
CESOP–UCP	25–26 Apr 2009	**41**	34	7	2	12	4	7
Marktest	14–19 Apr 2009	**36.2**	26.4	11.2	8.3	13.6	4.3	9.8
Aximage	1–3 Apr 2009	**38.1**	25.1	10.3	5.7	12.6	8.2	13.0
Eurosondagem	25–31 Mar 2009	**39.6**	29.6	9.4	7.0	9.6	4.8	10.0
Marktest	17–21 Mar 2009	**36.7**	28.4	8.9	9.4	12.6	4.0	8.3
Aximage	2–5 Mar 2009	**38.3**	24.0	9.0	6.8	12.6	9.3	14.3
Eurosondagem	26 Feb–3 Mar 2009	**39.0**	28.3	9.6	7.7	10.4	5.0	10.7
Marktest	17–22 Feb 2009	**38.2**	28.8	10.6	4.1	14.0	4.3	9.4
Aximage	2–5 Feb 2009	**38.2**	23.8	9.2	7.7	12.0	9.1	14.4
Eurosondagem	28 Jan–3 Feb 2009	**40.3**	29.1	8.8	6.9	10.1	4.8	11.2
Marktest	20–23 Jan 2009	**39.6**	24.9	11.9	9.7	10.1	3.8	14.7
Eurosondagem	7–13 Jan 2009	**41.1**	30.1	8.3	6.1	9.6	4.8	11.0
Aximage	6–9 Jan 2009	**37.3**	23.3	8.1	7.7	11.4	12.2	14.0
Marktest	16–19 Dec 2008	**39.9**	25.7	11.0	8.0	11.6	3.8	14.2
CESOP–UCP	13–14 Dec 2008	**41**	30	10	4	9	6	11
Aximage	3–5 Dec 2008	**37.9**	25.9	8.4	6.2	9.5	12.1	12.0
Eurosondagem	27 Nov–2 Dec 2008	**42.5**	30.0	8.4	6.0	8.7	4.4	12.5
Marktest	18–21 Nov 2008	**40.1**	26.4	10.0	6.2	13.1	4.2	13.7
Eurosondagem	5 Nov 2008	**41.8**	32.1	8.5	5.2	8.4	4.0	9.7
Aximage	3–5 Nov 2008	**38.6**	26.1	9.0	4.7	9.1	12.5	12.5
Marktest	21–24 Oct 2008	**39.8**	28.7	10.0	6.4	11.4	3.7	11.1
Intercampus	17–21 Oct 2008	**43.9**	28.9	10.2	4.0	12.3	0.8	15.0
Aximage	6–8 Oct 2008	**38.0**	28.5	9.2	3.8	9.3	11.2	9.5
CESOP–UCP	4–5 Oct 2008	**41**	34	8	2	8	7	7
Eurosondagem	25–30 Sep 2008	**40.2**	33.3	9.9	4.8	7.7	4.1	6.9
Marktest	16–20 Sep 2008	**36.1**	29.3	12.6	7.1	10.9	4.0	6.8
Aximage	8–10 Sep 2008	**35.7**	28.9	10.4	3.8	9.3	11.9	6.8
Eurosondagem	27 Aug–2 Sep 2008	**39.0**	33.0	10.1	5.0	8.4	4.5	6.0
Aximage	28–29 Jul 2008	**33.1**	31.1	9.1	4.4	9.4	12.9	2.0
Eurosondagem	23–29 Jul 2008	**39.6**	32.0	10.0	5.5	8.1	4.8	7.6
Marktest	15–18 Jul 2008	**36.7**	32.7	10.0	5.1	11.4	4.1	4.0
CESOP–UCP	5–9 Jul 2008	**40**	32	10	3	7	8	8
Aximage	1–4 Jul 2008	**32.5**	32.0	9.7	4.3	8.2	13.3	0.5
Eurosondagem	26 Jun–1 Jul 2008	**40.0**	29.0	10.1	6.0	9.6	5.3	11.0
Marktest	17–21 Jun 2008	**35.2**	30.8	11.1	6.7	12.3	3.9	4.4
Eurosondagem	28 May–3 Jun 2008	**41.8**	25.0	11.0	6.9	10.0	5.3	16.8
Marktest	19–26 May 2008	**33.0**	32.0	12.8	6.7	11.3	4.2	1.0
Aximage	7–8 May 2008	**36.5**	29.0	–	–	–	34.5	7.5
Eurosondagem	23–29 Apr 2008	**43.2**	26.9	10.0	6.3	8.8	4.8	16.3
Marktest	15–18 Apr 2008	**38.0**	31.5	10.8	4.3	11.5	3.9	6.5
Aximage	2–4 Apr 2008	**35.7**	26.0	8.9	5.1	10.2	14.1	9.7
Eurosondagem	27 Mar–1 Apr 2008	**42.1**	29.4	9.6	6.0	8.4	4.5	12.7
Marktest	17–20 Mar 2008	**37.8**	31.9	12.1	4.0	10.4	3.8	5.9
Aximage	3–5 Mar 2008	**33.8**	28.4	9.2	4.5	8.5	15.6	5.4
Eurosondagem	20–26 Feb 2008	**43.2**	31.2	8.3	5.8	7.2	4.3	12.0
CESOP–UCP	23–24 Feb 2008	**39**	32	9	3	8	9	7
Marktest	19–21 Feb 2008	**36.1**	33.4	12.8	5.6	8.0	4.1	2.7
Aximage	1–4 Feb 2008	**35.8**	30.0	8.2	4.6	7.2	14.2	5.8
Eurosondagem	24–28 Jan 2008	**42.5**	33.0	8.0	6.3	6.9	3.3	9.5
Marktest	15–18 Jan 2008	**38.1**	33.5	9.9	6.3	8.4	3.8	4.6
Aximage	7–9 Jan 2008	**35.2**	31.8	9.1	4.6	6.6	12.7	3.4
Eurosondagem	2–8 Jan 2008	**43.3**	32.5	8.0	6.0	6.6	3.6	10.8
Marktest	18–21 Dec 2007	**41.0**	32.5	9.5	5.4	7.8	3.8	8.5
Aximage	5–7 Dec 2007	**37.0**	29.2	8.5	4.4	6.7	14.2	7.8
Eurosondagem	28 Nov–4 Dec 2007	**44.2**	32.1	8.6	5.9	6.3	2.9	12.1
Marktest	20–23 Nov 2007	**43.8**	31.5	9.0	4.5	7.1	4.1	12.3
Aximage	7–9 Nov 2007	**36.1**	27.8	8.1	3.8	6.6	17.6	8.3
Eurosondagem	24–30 Oct 2007	**45.5**	31.5	8.8	5.0	5.9	3.3	14.0
CESOP–UCP	20–21 Oct 2007	**41**	35	9	6	4	5	6
Marktest	16–19 Oct 2007	**36.9**	35.9	12.3	2.9	8.1	3.9	1.0
Eurosondagem	2 Oct 2007	**45.4**	28.9	10.1	5.2	5.9	4.5	16.5
Aximage	1–2 Oct 2007	**34.8**	27.3	9.0	3.1	6.8	19.0	7.5
Marktest	18–21 Sep 2007	**41.5**	27.6	10.8	8.4	7.5	4.2	13.9
Aximage	3–4 Sep 2007	**34.6**	28.3	11.1	3.8	5.7	16.5	6.3
Eurosondagem	22–28 Aug 2007	**45.2**	30.3	9.2	5.0	5.5	4.8	14.9
Marktest	14–17 Aug 2007	**42.7**	28.3	9.4	7.2	8.5	3.9	14.4
Eurosondagem	7 Aug 2007	**43.5**	33.0	7.7	4.8	6.9	4.1	10.5
Aximage	21–22 Jul 2007	**38.5**	28.2	10.2	4.3	5.8	13.0	10.3
Marktest	17–20 Jul 2007	**43.9**	29.0	8.0	6.0	9.0	4.1	14.9
Aximage	4–6 Jul 2007	**40.4**	26.9	–	–	–	32.7	13.5
Marktest	19–22 Jun 2007	**40.4**	29.3	10.0	7.4	8.7	4.2	11.1
Aximage	5–7 Jun 2007	**38.5**	26.2				35.3	12.3
Eurosondagem	24–29 May 2007	**44.6**	33.4	7.7	4.0	6.6	3.7	11.2
Marktest	15–18 May 2007	**46.8**	27.3	8.4	5.6	8.2	3.7	19.5
Aximage	30 Apr–4 May 2007	**36.7**	26.7	7.6	6.0	7.0	16.0	10.0
Eurosondagem	26 Apr–2 May 2007	**42.2**	33.5	8.9	3.7	7.7	4.0	8.7
Marktest	17–20 Apr 2007	**43.3**	27.7	12.6	4.8	7.8	3.8	15.6
Aximage	16–18 Apr 2007	**36.9**	28.2	7.3	6.3	7.5	13.8	8.7
Aximage	30 Mar–4 Apr 2007	**35.7**	30.0	7.0	6.5	7.9	12.9	5.7
Eurosondagem	28 Mar–2 Apr 2007	**44.2**	32.3	9.5	2.7	7.4	3.9	11.9
Marktest	19–21 Mar 2007	**46.5**	25.8	9.2	5.7	9.0	3.8	20.7
Eurosondagem	2 Mar 2007	**45.4**	32.0	8.6	3.8	6.4	3.8	13.4
Aximage	1–2 Mar 2007	**37.4**	31.2	6.2	6.3	7.6	11.3	6.2
Marktest	13–16 Feb 2007	**47.1**	27.3	9.7	4.8	7.0	4.1	19.8
Aximage	31 Jan–2 Feb 2007	**39.0**	29.4	6.5	5.0	6.0	14.1	9.6
Eurosondagem	25–30 Jan 2007	**44.4**	33.3	7.8	4.4	6.7	3.4	11.1
Marktest	16–19 Jan 2007	**42.7**	28.4	9.2	7.6	8.3	3.8	14.3
Eurosondagem	12 Jan 2007	**45.5**	34.4	7.7	4.0	6.6	1.8	11.1
Aximage	7–9 Jan 2007	**38.9**	28.4	8.2	3.4	4.9	16.2	10.5
Marktest	19–22 Dec 2006	**43.1**	28.5	9.8	6.7	8.3	3.6	14.6
Aximage	5–7 Dec 2006	**40.9**	28.6	7.1	3.0	3.9	16.5	12.3
Eurosondagem	29 Nov–5 Dec 2006	**44.4**	31.3	8.8	4.7	8.0	2.8	13.1
Marktest	13–15 Nov 2006	**43.4**	28.5	10.3	5.7	8.2	3.9	14.9
Eurosondagem	10 Nov 2006	**43.7**	32.2	9.2	4.6	6.9	3.4	11.5
Aximage	6–8 Nov 2006	**39.4**	29.3	7.2	2.8	3.9	17.4	10.1
Marktest	17–20 Oct 2006	**42.0**	29.7	10.6	3.9	9.7	4.1	12.3
Aximage	2–4 Oct 2006	**38.2**	29.7	7.3	3.4	4.7	16.7	8.5
Eurosondagem	27 Sep–3 Oct 2006	**44.6**	33.5	7.7	4.0	6.5	3.7	11.1
Marktest	19–22 Sep 2006	**45.7**	29.9	9.9	1.7	8.4	4.4	15.8
Aximage	6–7 Sep 2006	**36.6**	29.6	9.1	3.3	6.7	14.7	7.0
Eurosondagem	31 Aug–5 Sep 2006	**44.2**	34.3	7.1	5.0	5.9	3.5	9.9
Marktest	15–18 Aug 2006	**44.4**	30.9	9.8	2.2	8.5	4.2	13.5
Marktest	18–21 Jul 2006	**43.1**	31.9	9.7	2.6	8.6	4.1	11.2
Eurosondagem	29 Jun–4 Jul 2006	**43.8**	32.5	8.7	3.9	7.5	3.6	11.3
Marktest	20–23 Jun 2006	**44.1**	28.6	9.5	6.1	7.8	3.9	15.5
Eurosondagem	8 Jun 2006	**43.0**	34.5	8.0	4.9	6.9	2.7	8.5
Aximage	2–3 Jun 2006	**36.8**	31.7	7.6	3.8	5.7	14.4	5.1
Marktest	16–19 May 2006	**42.1**	30.2	8.2	7.0	8.5	4.0	11.9
Aximage	4–5 May 2006	**37.5**	32.2	8.2	4.6	3.8	13.7	5.3
Eurosondagem	26 Apr–2 May 2006	**43.3**	36.0	6.9	5.0	5.2	3.6	7.3
Marktest	18–21 Apr 2006	**43.1**	30.5	8.0	5.2	9.0	4.2	12.6
Eurosondagem	10 Apr 2006	**42.4**	36.6	7.7	4.7	5.0	3.6	5.8
Aximage	1–3 Apr 2006	**37.8**	34.2	7.6	3.8	4.4	12.2	3.6
Marktest	21–24 Mar 2006	**41.9**	35.1	7.2	4.0	7.8	4.0	6.8
Eurosondagem	2–7 Mar 2006	**42.6**	34.3	8.4	4.8	6.3	3.6	8.3
Aximage	1–3 Mar 2006	**37.9**	34.1	6.9	4.0	5.1	12.0	3.8
Marktest	15–19 Feb 2006	**38.0**	35.8	9.6	3.8	8.8	4.0	2.2
Eurosondagem	2–7 Feb 2006	**41.4**	36.0	8.0	5.2	5.8	3.6	5.4
Aximage	1–3 Feb 2006	**37.9**	34.5	6.9	4.4	7.3	9.0	3.4
Eurosondagem	5–10 Jan 2006	**43.3**	33.0	7.7	5.8	6.9	3.3	10.3
Aximage	3–5 Jan 2006	**37.5**	33.9	7.1	4.2	8.2	9.1	3.6
Aximage	30 Nov–2 Dec 2005	**35.4**	34.9	7.4	4.8	7.7	9.8	0.5
Marktest	15–19 Nov 2005	35.4	**37.7**	9.1	5.3	8.5	4.0	2.3
Aximage	7–8 Nov 2005	**35.1**	33.4	8.1	4.1	7.2	12.1	1.7
Marktest	18–21 Oct 2005	**37.3**	36.1	8.2	5.3	9.1	4.0	1.2
Aximage	17–19 Oct 2005	**35.4**	32.7	7.6	3.7	8.0	12.6	2.7
**2005 local elections**	9 Oct 2005	35.8 (94)	**39.9** (105)	11.0 (22)	3.1 (4)	3.0 (5)	7.2 (0)	**4.1**
Eurosondagem	22–27 Sep 2005	**42.5**	33.0	8.0	7.0	6.0	3.5	9.5
Marktest	20–26 Sep 2005	33.7	**39.0**	9.6	4.3	9.6	3.8	5.3
Aximage	5–6 Sep 2005	**38.2**	30.1				31.7	8.1
Eurosondagem	1–6 Sep 2005	**43.0**	31.9	7.8	6.2	6.8	4.2	11.1
Marktest	19–22 Jul 2005	**43.0**	31.2	8.2	4.0	9.4	4.2	11.8
Aximage	1–5 Jul 2005	**40.4**	28.4	6.5	4.5	7.2	13.0	12.0
UCP	18–20 Jun 2005	**42**	31	11	3	8	5	11
Marktest	14–17 Jun 2005	**46.5**	27.7	10.8	4.2	6.9	3.9	18.8
Aximage	3–6 Jun 2005	**45.7**	26.0	5.8	3.1	6.7	12.7	19.3
Marktest	17–19 May 2005	**48.8**	30.2	6.0	4.2	6.8	4.0	18.6
Aximage	3–4 May 2005	**46.1**	26.5	6.6	4.9	5.2	10.7	19.6
Marktest	19–22 Apr 2005	**45.7**	30.6	7.2	4.5	8.1	3.9	15.1
Aximage	3–4 Apr 2005	**44.7**	29.3	7.2	4.8	5.8	8.2	15.4
Marktest	15–18 Mar 2005	**51.7**	26.3	6.5	5.0	6.7	3.8	25.4
**2005 legislative election**	20 Feb 2005	**45.0**; 121	28.8; 75	7.5; 14	7.2; 12	6.4; 8	5.1; 0	**16.2**

== Leadership polls ==
=== Preferred prime minister ===
Poll results showing public opinion on who would make the best prime minister are shown in the table below in reverse chronological order, showing the most recent first.

==== Sócrates vs Ferreira Leite ====
Polling firm/Link	Fieldwork date	José Sócrates	Ferreira Leite	N/B/NO	Lead
Aximage	14–17 Sep 2009	45.7	26.4	27.9	19.3
Aximage	1–4 Sep 2009	42.0	26.1	31.9	15.9
Aximage	1–6 Jul 2009	42.4	29.1	28.5	13.3
Aximage	1–4 Jun 2009	46.0	32.0	22.0	14.0
Aximage	5–7 May 2009	46.6	22.7	30.7	23.9
Aximage	1–3 Apr 2009	46.6	22.7	30.7	23.9
Aximage	2–5 Mar 2009	48.3	20.5	31.2	27.8
Aximage	2–5 Feb 2009	47.9	22.3	29.8	25.6
Aximage	6–9 Jan 2009	47.5	22.9	29.6	24.6
Aximage	3–5 Dec 2008	47.9	24.9	27.2	23.0
Aximage	3–5 Nov 2008	46.8	26.3	26.9	20.5
Aximage	6–8 Oct 2008	40.9	28.4	30.7	12.5
Aximage	8–10 Sep 2008	38.7	30.3	31.0	8.4
Aximage	28–29 Jul 2008	37.0	33.2	29.8	3.8
Aximage	1–4 Jul 2008	36.1	33.1	30.8	3.0

=== Cabinet approval/disapproval ratings ===
Poll results showing public opinion on the performance of the Government are shown in the table below in reverse chronological order, showing the most recent first.

Polling firm/Link	Fieldwork date	José Sócrates' cabinet				
Polling firm/Link	Fieldwork date	Approve	Disapprove	Neither	No opinion	Lead
CESOP–UCP	4–8 Sep 2009	37	57	—N/a	6	20
CESOP–UCP	13–14 Dec 2008	35	60	—N/a	5	25
CESOP–UCP	23–24 Feb 2008	26	66	—N/a	8	40
Eurosondagem	25–30 Jan 2007	32.9	34.4	32.7		1.5
Eurosondagem	29 Nov–5 Dec 2006	29.6	?	?	?	?
