= Fátima Correia Pinto =

Portuguese politician (born 1984)

Fátima Liliana Fontes Correia Pinto

Member of the Assembly of the Republic
- In office February 2022 – 18 May 2025
- Constituency: Vila Real

Personal details
- Born: 3 August 1984 (age 41)
- Party: Portuguese: Socialist Party (PS)
- Spouse: João Manuel Almeida Pinto
- Occupation: Politician

Fátima Liliana Fontes Correia Pinto (born 1984) is a Portuguese politician. She became a deputy in the Assembly of the Republic in February 2022 as a member of the Socialist Party (PS), representing the Vila Real constituency.

== Early life ==
Pinto was born on 3 August 1984. She obtained a degree in economics and a master's in business management. From 2017 she worked for the municipality of Chaves in the Vila Real district in the north of Portugal, being in charge of a municipal company operates includes spas, parking systems, recreational pools and campsites.

== Political career ==
In the January 2022 national election she was the second on the list of PS candidates for the Vila Real constituency and was elected to the National Assembly, where she became a member of the Economy, Public Works, Planning and Housing Committee and the Health Committee. In the March 2024 election, called after the PS prime minister, António Costa resigned following allegations of corruption in his government, she was top of the PS list for Vila Real. The Socialist Party won two seats of the five available in the constituency. Returning to parliament, she became a member of the Local Power and Territorial Cohesion Committee.
