= Constança Cunha e Sá =

Portuguese journalist (1958–2025)

- Born: 23 August 1958; Lisbon, Portugal
- Died: 2 December 2025 (aged 67); Lisbon, Portugal
- Education: Catholic University of Portugal
- Occupations: Print and television journalist

Constança Cunha e Sá (1958 – 2025) was a Portuguese journalist and political commentator, known for being incisive in her television interviews.

== Early life ==
Cunha e Sá was born in the Portuguese capital of Lisbon on 23 August 1958. She studied at the Lisbon campus of the Catholic University of Portugal, where she obtained a degree in philosophy. After graduating she taught for three years in several Lisbon high schools, including the Pedro Nunes High School in Lisbon. She began working as a journalist in 1988 at Sábado magazine, which was then edited by Joaquim Letria. Her first report was of a congress of the Social Democratic Party (PSD). She would contribute to Sábado until 2007.

== Career ==
In 1996, Cunha e Sá was appointed director of the weekly newspaper O Independente, owned by Paulo Portas, which she left two years later. She then worked at Diário Económico before starting to work at Televisão Independente (TVI) where she became the politics editor in the newsroom. She remained at TVI until 2020, leaving after disagreeing with the sale of 30% of the shares of TVI's controlling company, Media Capital. She returned a year later as a political commentator, becoming known for her outspokenness. Also on television, she moderated the programme A Prova dos 9, on TVI24 (now CNN Portugal), in which, together with others, she commented on the political, social, and economic situation in Portugal. Throughout her career, Cunha e Sá wrote for several Portuguese newspapers, including: Público, Jornal de Negócios and Correio da Manhã.

== Death and tributes ==
Cunha e Sá died from lung cancer in Lisbon on 2 December 2025, at the age of 67. Among others to pay tribute was the Portuguese president, Marcelo Rebelo de Sousa, who noted that she was a "singular figure in Portuguese journalism [who] leaves an indelible memory in all those who had the privilege of working with and knowing her." The Portuguese newspaper, Diário de Notícias, wrote that she "stood out for her ability to explain complex issues of Portuguese politics in a way that was accessible to the public."
