= Liberal Democratic Party (Portugal) =

Liberal Democratic Party Partido Liberal Democrata
- Leader: Francisco Oliveira
- Founded: 2007
- Dissolved: 2019
- Headquarters: Sede Rua Castilho, n.º 5 - 1ª Loja 1250-066 Lisboa
- Ideology: Liberalism
- Political position: Centre

Website
- http://www.mudarportugal.pt

The Liberal Democratic Party (Portuguese: Partido Liberal-Democrata, PLD) was a minor liberal–centrist political party in Portugal. It never had representatives in the Assembly of the Republic, the Portuguese legislature.

It was founded in September 2007, in Lisbon by college professor Eduardo Correia as the Merit and Society Movement (Portuguese: Movimento Mérito e Sociedade, pronounced [muviˈmẽtu ˈmɛɾitu i susieˈðaðɨ]; abbreviated MMS). On April 29, 2008 8,400 signatures were presented to the Portuguese Constitutional Court to start the legal procedures for the formation of the party. It was recognized the same month. Since 2011, it has been called the Liberal Democratic Party. It was declared extinct by the Portuguese Constitutional Court in November 2019.
