= Hope for Portugal Movement =

Hope for Portugal Movement Movimento Esperança Portugal
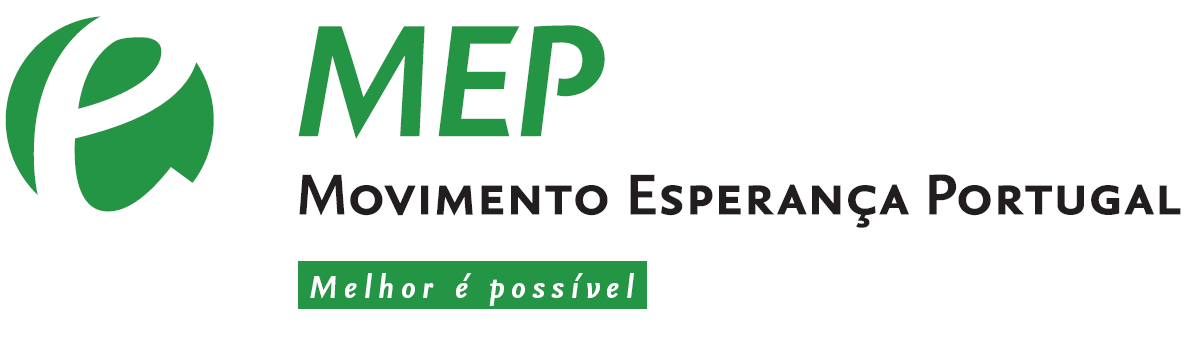
- Leader: Rui Marques
- Founded: 23 July 2008
- Dissolved: 12 December 2012
- Headquarters: Travessa das Pedras Negras, 1 - 4º 1100-404, Lisbon
- Ideology: Centrism; Liberalism
- Political position: Centre
- Colours: Green

Website
- www.mep.pt

Hope for Portugal Movement (Portuguese: Movimento Esperança Portugal, pronounced [muviˈmẽtu ɨʃpɨˈɾɐ̃sɐ puɾtuˈɣal]; MEP) was a minor centrist political party in Portugal. It had no representatives in the Assembly of the Republic, or the Portuguese legislature. Its name in Portuguese could also be translated as the incentivising expression "Have Hope Portugal" Movement.

It was formed on 23 July 2008 when the Portuguese Constitutional Court accepted the necessary 8,400 signatures for it to be legally recognized. Portuguese activist and entrepreneur Rui Marques was the first face of the then civic group that preceded the MEP. The first party congress took place on 4/5 October 2008, and approved the party's program and statutes. MEP announced it was going to contest the European Parliamentary and legislative elections of 2009.

Due to the low results achieved by the party in the 2011 elections, Rui Marques resigned as party chairman. On 29 January 2012, the party released a statement informing party members that, due to the poor results achieved in the four elections in which they contested, the party would be dissolved as a political party although continuing its action as a civic movement.

On 9 January 2013, the dissolution of the party was accepted by the Constitutional Court, with effect from 12 December 2012.
