= Results breakdown of the 2015 Portuguese legislative election =

2015 Portuguese legislative election
← 2011	4 October 2015	2019 →
- All 230 seats in the Assembly of the Republic; 116 seats needed for a majority
- Turnout: 55.8%
Party	Leader	Vote %	Seats	+/–
PáF (Note: The Social Democratic Party (PSD) and the People's Party (CDS–PP) contested the 2015 election in a coalition called Portugal Ahead (PàF) and won a combined 38.6% of the vote and elected 107 MPs to parliament.)	Pedro Passos Coelho	38.6%	107	−25
PS	António Costa	32.3%	86	+12
BE	Catarina Martins	10.2%	19	+11
CDU	Jerónimo de Sousa	8.3%	17	+1
PAN	André Lourenço e Silva	1.4%	1	+1
This lists parties that won seats. See the complete results below.
Prime Minister before	Prime Minister after
Pedro Passos Coelho; PSD	Pedro Passos Coelho (Note: Following the election, Pedro Passos Coelho was first designated as Prime Minister by the President of the Republic with a PSD/CDS-PP minority government. He took the oath of office for his second term on October 30, 2015. On November 10, 2015, Coelho's government was defeated in a motion of no confidence vote, 123 against 107, prompting the fall of his government. The President of the Republic, Aníbal Cavaco Silva, then invited PS leader António Costa to form a minority government with the support of BE and CDU. Costa's minority government was sworn in on 26 November 2015.); PSD

This is the results breakdown of the Assembly of the Republic election held in Portugal on 4 October 2015. The following tables show detailed results in each of the country's 22 electoral constituencies.

== Electoral system ==
The Assembly of the Republic has 230 members elected to four-year terms. The number of seats to be elected by each district depends on the district magnitude. 226 seats are allocated proportionally by the number of registered voters in the 18 Districts in Mainland Portugal, plus Azores and Madeira, and 4 fixed seats are allocated for overseas voters, 2 seats for voters in Europe and another 2 seats for voters Outside Europe. The 230 members of Parliament are elected using the D'Hondt method and by a closed list proportional representation system. Members represent the country as a whole and not the constituencies in which they were elected.

== Summary ==
=== Nationwide results ===
Summary of the 4 October 2015 Assembly of the Republic elections results
Parties	Votes	%	±pp swing	MPs				
Parties	Votes	%	±pp swing	2011	2015	±	%	±
Portugal Ahead (PSD/CDS–PP) (Note: Electoral lists only in continental Portugal.)	1,993,504	36.86	▼10.9	124	102	▼22	44.35	▼10.5
Socialist	1,747,730	32.32	▲4.3	74	86	▲12	37.39	▲5.2
Left Bloc	550,945	10.19	▲5.0	8	19	▲11	8.26	▲4.8
Unitary Democratic Coalition	445,901	8.25	▲0.4	16	17	▲1	7.39	▲0.4
Social Democratic (Note: Electoral list only in Madeira and Azores.)	80,841	1.49	—	7	5	▼2	2.17	▼0.9
People-Animals-Nature	75,170	1.39	▲0.4	0	1	▲1	0.43	▲0.4
Democratic Republican	61,920	1.13	—	—	0	—	0.00	—
Portuguese Workers' Communist	60,045	1.11	▼0.0	0	0	0	0.00	0.0
LIVRE/Time to move forward	39,330	0.73	—	—	0	—	0.00	—
National Renovator	27,286	0.50	▲0.2	0	0	0	0.00	0.0
Earth	22,627	0.42	▲0.0	0	0	0	0.00	0.0
We, the Citizens!	21,382	0.40	—	—	0	—	0.00	—
ACT! (Labour/Socialist Alternative)	20,793	0.38	—	—	0	—	0.00	—
People's Monarchist	14,916	0.28	▲0.0	0	0	0	0.00	0.0
Together for the People	14,275	0.26	—	—	0	—	0.00	—
United Party of Retirees and Pensioners	13,899	0.26	—	—	0	—	0.00	—
People's (Note: Electoral list only in Madeira.)	7,496	0.14	—	1	0	▼1	0.00	▼0.4
Alliance Azores (CDS–PP/PPM) (Note: Electoral list only in Azores.)	3,624	0.07	—	0	0	0	0.00	0.0
Citizenship and Christian Democracy	2,685	0.05	▼0.1	0	0	0	0.00	0.0
Labour (Note: Electoral list only in Madeira.)	1,744	0.03	—	0	0	0	0.00	0.0
Total valid	5,206,113	96.27	▲0.4	230	230	0	100.00	0.0
Blank ballots	112,955	2.09	▼0.6					
Invalid ballots	89,024	1.65	▲0.3					
Total	5,408,092	100.00						
Registered voters/turnout	9,684,922	55.84	▼2.2					
Source: Diário da República - Resultados Oficias

== Results by constituency ==
=== Azores ===
Summary of the 4 October 2015 Assembly of the Republic elections results in Azores
Parties	Votes	%	±pp swing	MPs		
Parties	Votes	%	±pp swing	2011	2015	±
Socialist	37,869	40.37	▲14.7	2	3	▲1
Social Democratic	33,826	36.06	▼11.3	3	2	▼1
Left Bloc	7,330	7.81	▲3.4	0	0	0
Alliance Azores (CDS–PP/PPM)	3,654	3.90	▼8.5	0	0	0
Unitary Democratic Coalition	2,320	2.47	▼0.0	0	0	0
People–Animals–Nature	815	0.87	▲0.1	0	0	0
We, the Citizens!	766	0.82	—	—	0	—
Portuguese Workers' Communist	601	0.64	▼0.1	0	0	0
Democratic Republican	511	0.54	—	—	0	—
United Party of Retirees and Pensioners	346	0.37	—	—	0	—
LIVRE/Time to move forward	332	0.35	—	—	0	—
ACT! (Labour/Socialist Alternative)	319	0.34	—	—	0	—
Earth	299	0.32	▼0.0	0	0	0
National Renovator	185	0.20	▲0.0	0	0	0
Total valid	89,173	95.06	▼0.3	5	5	0
Blank ballots	3,047	3.25	▼0.3			
Invalid ballots	1,583	1.69	▲0.7			
Total	93,803	100.00				
Registered voters/turnout	227,546	41.22	▲0.6			
Source: Resultados Açores

=== Aveiro ===
Summary of the 4 October 2015 Assembly of the Republic elections results in Aveiro
Parties	Votes	%	±pp swing	MPs		
Parties	Votes	%	±pp swing	2011	2015	±
Portugal Ahead (PSD/CDS–PP)	177,185	48.14	▼9.2	10	10	0
Socialist	102,726	27.91	▲2.0	5	5	0
Left Bloc	35,327	9.60	▲4.6	1	1	0
Unitary Democratic Coalition	16,038	4.36	▲0.3	0	0	0
Democratic Republican	4,548	1.24	—	—	0	—
People–Animals–Nature	3,573	0.97	▲0.2	0	0	0
Portuguese Workers' Communist	3,280	0.89	▲0.0	0	0	0
National Renovator	1,698	0.46	▲0.1	0	0	0
LIVRE/Time to move forward	1,660	0.45	—	—	0	—
Earth	1,325	0.36	▲0.0	0	0	0
People's Monarchist	1,292	0.35	▲0.1	0	0	0
ACT! (Labour/Socialist Alternative)	1,253	0.34	—	—	0	—
We, the Citizens!	1,006	0.27	—	—	0	—
Citizenship and Christian Democracy	785	0.21	▲0.0	0	0	0
United Party of Retirees and Pensioners	634	0.17	—	—	0	—
Together for the People	448	0.12	—	—	0	—
Total valid	352,778	95.85	▼0.0	16	16	0
Blank ballots	9,163	2.49	▼0.4			
Invalid ballots	6,130	1.67	▲0.5			
Total	368,071	100.00				
Registered voters/turnout	653,597	56.31	▼2.7			
Source: Resultados Aveiro

=== Beja ===
Summary of the 4 October 2015 Assembly of the Republic elections results in Beja
Parties	Votes	%	±pp swing	MPs		
Parties	Votes	%	±pp swing	2011	2015	±
Socialist	27,775	37.29	▲7.5	1	1	0
Unitary Democratic Coalition	18,592	24.96	▼0.4	1	1	0
Portugal Ahead (PSD/CDS–PP)	14,980	20.11	▼10.8	1	1	0
Left Bloc	6,105	8.20	▲3.0	0	0	0
Portuguese Workers' Communist	1,945	2.61	▲0.0	0	0	0
People–Animals–Nature	608	0.82	▲0.1	0	0	0
Democratic Republican	351	0.47	—	—	0	—
United Party of Retirees and Pensioners	340	0.46	—	—	0	—
National Renovator	275	0.37	▼0.0	0	0	0
LIVRE	271	0.36	—	—	0	—
Earth	248	0.33	▼0.0	0	0	0
ACT! (Labour/Socialist Alternative)	193	0.26	—	—	0	—
People's Monarchist	192	0.26	▲0.1	0	0	0
We, the Citizens!	160	0.21	—	—	0	—
Together for the People	88	0.12	—	—	0	—
Total valid	72,123	96.83	▲0.4	3	3	0
Blank ballots	1,230	1.65	▼0.6			
Invalid ballots	6,130	1.52	▲0.1			
Total	74,485	100.00				
Registered voters/turnout	128,926	57.77	▲2.6			
Source: Resultados Beja

=== Braga ===
Summary of the 4 October 2015 Assembly of the Republic elections results in Braga
Parties	Votes	%	±pp swing	MPs		
Parties	Votes	%	±pp swing	2011	2015	±
Portugal Ahead (PSD/CDS–PP)	216,357	45.61	▼4.9	11	10	▼1
Socialist	146,412	30.87	▼2.0	7	7	0
Left Bloc	41,745	8.80	▲4.6	0	1	▲1
Unitary Democratic Coalition	24,632	5.19	▲0.3	1	1	0
Democratic Republican	7,500	1.58	—	—	0	—
Portuguese Workers' Communist	5,486	1.15	▲0.3	0	0	0
People–Animals–Nature	3,682	0.78	▲0.2	0	0	0
LIVRE/Time to move forward	2,333	0.49	—	—	0	—
National Renovator	1,836	0.39	▲0.2	0	0	0
ACT! (Labour/Socialist Alternative)	1,620	0.34	—	—	0	—
Earth	1,604	0.34	▼0.1	0	0	0
Citizenship and Christian Democracy	993	0.21	▲0.0	0	0	0
We, the Citizens!	972	0.20	—	—	0	—
People's Monarchist	884	0.19	▼0.0	0	0	0
United Party of Retirees and Pensioners	878	0.19	—	—	0	—
Together for the People	637	0.13	—	—	0	—
Total valid	457,521	96.45	▼0.2	19	19	0
Blank ballots	10,708	2.26	▼0.4			
Invalid ballots	6,112	1.29	▲0.2			
Total	474,341	100.00				
Registered voters/turnout	787,768	60.21	▼2.4			
Source: Resultados Braga

=== Bragança ===
Summary of the 4 October 2015 Assembly of the Republic elections results in Bragança
Parties	Votes	%	±pp swing	MPs		
Parties	Votes	%	±pp swing	2011	2015	±
Portugal Ahead (PSD/CDS–PP)	34,408	49.41	▼13.7	2	2	0
Socialist	23,718	34.06	▲8.0	1	1	0
Left Bloc	3,858	5.54	▲3.2	0	0	0
Unitary Democratic Coalition	2,136	3.07	▲0.6	0	0	0
Democratic Republican	546	0.78	—	—	0	—
Portuguese Workers' Communist	537	0.77	▲0.2	0	0	0
People–Animals–Nature	386	0.55	—	—	0	—
ACT! (Labour/Socialist Alternative)	284	0.41	—	—	0	—
LIVRE/Time to move forward	251	0.36	—	—	0	—
People's Monarchist	229	0.33	0.0	0	0	0
Earth	223	0.32	▼0.1	0	0	0
National Renovator	190	0.27	▲0.1	0	0	0
We, the Citizens!	160	0.23	—	—	0	—
Together for the People	121	0.17	—	—	0	—
Total valid	67,047	96.27	▼0.4	3	3	0
Blank ballots	1,189	1.71	▼0.2			
Invalid ballots	1,408	2.02	▲0.5			
Total	69,644	100.00				
Registered voters/turnout	147,465	47.23	▼1.9			
Source: Resultados Bragança

=== Castelo Branco ===
Summary of the 4 October 2015 Assembly of the Republic elections results in Castelo Branco
Parties	Votes	%	±pp swing	MPs		
Parties	Votes	%	±pp swing	2011	2015	±
Socialist	40,502	38.86	▲4.1	2	2	0
Portugal Ahead (PSD/CDS–PP)	36,803	35.31	▼12.2	2	2	0
Left Bloc	10,450	10.03	▲5.8	0	0	0
Unitary Democratic Coalition	6,286	6.03	▲1.1	0	0	0
Democratic Republican	1,086	1.04	—	—	0	—
Portuguese Workers' Communist	1,080	1.04	▼0.3	0	0	0
People–Animals–Nature	860	0.83	▲0.1	0	0	0
National Renovator	508	0.49	▲0.1	0	0	0
LIVRE/Time to move forward	507	0.49	—	—	0	—
People's Monarchist	496	0.48	▲0.1	0	0	0
Earth	474	0.45	▲0.1	0	0	0
ACT! (Labour/Socialist Alternative)	374	0.36	—	—	0	—
United Party of Retirees and Pensioners	272	0.26	—	—	0	—
We, the Citizens!	267	0.26	—	—	0	—
Total valid	99,965	95.91	▲0.3	4	4	0
Blank ballots	2,091	2.01	▼0.7			
Invalid ballots	2,167	2.08	▲0.3			
Total	104,223	100.00				
Registered voters/turnout	181,378	57.46	▼0.2			
Source: Resultados Castelo Branco

=== Coimbra ===
Summary of the 4 October 2015 Assembly of the Republic elections results in Coimbra
Parties	Votes	%	±pp swing	MPs		
Parties	Votes	%	±pp swing	2011	2015	±
Portugal Ahead (PSD/CDS–PP)	81,882	37.18	▼12.9	6	4	▼2
Socialist	77,684	35.28	▲6.1	3	4	▲1
Left Bloc	21,780	9.89	▲4.1	0	1	▲1
Unitary Democratic Coalition	15,476	7.03	▲0.8	0	0	0
Democratic Republican	3,615	1.64	—	—	0	—
People–Animals–Nature	2,165	0.98	▼0.1	0	0	0
Portuguese Workers' Communist	1,889	0.86	▼0.0	0	0	0
LIVRE/Time to move forward	1,292	0.59	—	—	0	—
National Renovator	1,097	0.50	▲0.2	0	0	0
ACT! (Labour/Socialist Alternative)	1,081	0.49	—	—	0	—
Earth	854	0.39	▲0.1	0	0	0
We, the Citizens!	683	0.31	—	—	0	—
People's Monarchist	525	0.24	▼0.0	0	0	0
United Party of Retirees and Pensioners	451	0.20	—	—	0	—
Together for the People	272	0.12	—	—	0	—
Total valid	210,746	95.70	▲0.7	9	9	0
Blank ballots	5,929	2.69	▼0.9			
Invalid ballots	3,536	1.61	▲0.2			
Total	220,211	100.00				
Registered voters/turnout	390,947	56.33	▼1.1			
Source: Resultados Coimbra

=== Évora ===
Summary of the 4 October 2015 Assembly of the Republic elections results in Évora
Parties	Votes	%	±pp swing	MPs		
Parties	Votes	%	±pp swing	2011	2015	±
Socialist	31,705	37.47	▲8.4	1	1	0
Portugal Ahead (PSD/CDS–PP)	20,275	23.96	▼12.2	1	1	0
Unitary Democratic Coalition	18,567	21.94	▼0.2	1	1	0
Left Bloc	7,312	8.64	▲3.7	0	0	0
Portuguese Workers' Communist	1,245	1.47	▼0.6	0	0	0
People–Animals–Nature	723	0.85	▲0.1	0	0	0
Democratic Republican	443	0.52	—	—	0	—
People's Monarchist	363	0.43	▲0.2	0	0	0
LIVRE/Time to move forward	356	0.42	—	—	0	—
National Renovator	280	0.33	▲0.1	0	0	0
Earth	242	0.29	▲0.0	0	0	0
ACT! (Labour/Socialist Alternative)	224	0.26	—	—	0	—
We, the Citizens!	216	0.26	—	—	0	—
United Party of Retirees and Pensioners	166	0.20	—	—	0	—
Total valid	82,117	97.05	▲0.4	3	3	0
Blank ballots	1,421	1.68	▼0.4			
Invalid ballots	1,079	1.28	▲0.1			
Total	84,617	100.00				
Registered voters/turnout	141,258	59.90	▲0.9			
Source: Resultados Évora

=== Faro ===
Summary of the 4 October 2015 Assembly of the Republic elections results in Faro
Parties	Votes	%	±pp swing	MPs		
Parties	Votes	%	±pp swing	2011	2015	±
Socialist	62,422	32.77	▲9.8	2	4	▲2
Portugal Ahead (PSD/CDS–PP)	59,950	31.47	▼18.3	5	3	▼2
Left Bloc	26,922	14.31	▲6.1	1	1	0
Unitary Democratic Coalition	16,539	8.68	▲0.1	1	1	0
People–Animals–Nature	3,783	1.99	▲0.4	0	0	0
Portuguese Workers' Communist	3,012	1.58	▲0.0	0	0	0
Democratic Republican	2,293	1.20	—	—	0	—
LIVRE/Time to move forward	1,435	0.75	—	—	0	—
National Renovator	1,343	0.71	▲0.2	0	0	0
We, the Citizens!	1,337	0.70	—	—	0	—
Earth	1,222	0.64	▲0.4	0	0	0
ACT! (Labour/Socialist Alternative)	1,220	0.64	—	—	0	—
United Party of Retirees and Pensioners	886	0.47	—	—	0	—
People's Monarchist	755	0.40	▲0.0	0	0	0
Total valid	183,119	96.13	▲0.6	9	9	0
Blank ballots	4,286	2.25	▼0.7			
Invalid ballots	3,079	1.62	▲0.1			
Total	190,484	100.00				
Registered voters/turnout	370,764	51.38	▼4.4			
Source: Resultados Faro

=== Guarda ===
Summary of the 4 October 2015 Assembly of the Republic elections results in Guarda
Parties	Votes	%	±pp swing	MPs		
Parties	Votes	%	±pp swing	2011	2015	±
Portugal Ahead (PSD/CDS–PP)	38,964	45.59	▼12.0	3	2	▼1
Socialist	28,868	33.78	▲5.5	1	2	▲1
Left Bloc	6,341	7.42	▲4.1	0	0	0
Unitary Democratic Coalition	3,379	3.95	▲0.5	0	0	0
Democratic Republican	958	1.12	—	—	0	—
People–Animals–Nature	725	0.85	▲0.3	0	0	0
Portuguese Workers' Communist	689	0.81	0.0	0	0	0
National Renovator	389	0.46	▲0.3	0	0	0
Earth	298	0.35	▲0.1	0	0	0
LIVRE/Time to move forward	287	0.34	—	—	0	—
ACT! (Labour/Socialist Alternative)	277	0.32	—	—	0	—
People's Monarchist	211	0.25	▲0.1	0	0	0
We, the Citizens!	180	0.21	—	—	0	—
United Party of Retirees and Pensioners	144	0.17	—	—	0	—
Together for the People	88	0.10	—	—	0	—
Total valid	81,793	95.70	▼0.0	4	4	0
Blank ballots	1,689	1.98	▼0.4			
Invalid ballots	1,987	2.32	▲0.4			
Total	85,469	100.00				
Registered voters/turnout	163,462	52.29	▼1.6			
Source: Resultados Guarda

=== Leiria ===
Summary of the 4 October 2015 Assembly of the Republic elections results in Leiria
Parties	Votes	%	±pp swing	MPs		
Parties	Votes	%	±pp swing	2011	2015	±
Portugal Ahead (PSD/CDS–PP)	115,453	48.42	▼11.4	7	6	▼1
Socialist	59,184	24.82	▲4.1	3	3	0
Left Bloc	23,034	9.66	▲4.3	0	1	▲1
Unitary Democratic Coalition	12,181	5.11	▲0.1	0	0	0
Democratic Republican	4,067	1.71	—	—	0	—
People–Animals–Nature	2,908	1.22	▲0.0	0	0	0
Portuguese Workers' Communist	2,517	1.06	▲0.1	0	0	0
LIVRE/Time to move forward	1,786	0.75	—	—	0	—
Earth	1,189	0.50	▲0.1	0	0	0
National Renovator	1,073	0.45	▲0.2	0	0	0
ACT! (Labour/Socialist Alternative)	916	0.38	—	—	0	—
We, the Citizens!	840	0.35	—	—	0	—
People's Monarchist	701	0.29	▲0.1	0	0	0
United Party of Retirees and Pensioners	612	0.26	—	—	0	—
Together for the People	371	0.16	—	—	0	—
Total valid	226,832	95.13	▲0.1	10	10	0
Blank ballots	6,902	2.89	▼0.6			
Invalid ballots	4,699	1.97	▲0.4			
Total	238,433	100.00				
Registered voters/turnout	423,801	56.26	▼2.2			
Source: Resultados Leiria

=== Lisbon ===
Summary of the 4 October 2015 Assembly of the Republic elections results in Lisbon
Parties	Votes	%	±pp swing	MPs		
Parties	Votes	%	±pp swing	2011	2015	±
Portugal Ahead (PSD/CDS–PP)	399,520	34.68	▼13.2	25	18	▼7
Socialist	386,354	33.54	▲6.0	14	18	▲4
Left Bloc	125,438	10.89	▲5.2	3	5	▲2
Unitary Democratic Coalition	113,406	9.84	▲0.3	5	5	0
People–Animals–Nature	22,628	1.96	▲0.6	0	1	▲1
LIVRE/Time to move forward	14,683	1.27	—	—	0	—
Portuguese Workers' Communist	11,083	0.96	▼0.2	0	0	0
Democratic Republican	10,249	0.89	—	—	0	—
National Renovator	7,188	0.62	▲0.1	0	0	0
Earth	5,078	0.44	▲0.1	0	0	0
ACT! (Labour/Socialist Alternative)	5,026	0.44	—	—	0	—
United Party of Retirees and Pensioners	3,999	0.35	—	—	0	—
We, the Citizens!	3,737	0.32	—	—	0	—
People's Monarchist	2,820	0.24	▼0.2	0	0	0
Together for the People	1,553	0.13	—	—	0	—
Total valid	1,112,762	96.59	▲0.6	47	47	0
Blank ballots	22,176	1.92	▼0.7			
Invalid ballots	17,112	1.49	▲0.1			
Total	1,152,050	100.00				
Registered voters/turnout	1,900,962	60.60	▼1.6			
Source: Resultados Lisboa

=== Madeira ===
Summary of the 4 October 2015 Assembly of the Republic elections results in Madeira
Parties	Votes	%	±pp swing	MPs		
Parties	Votes	%	±pp swing	2011	2015	±
Social Democratic	47,228	37.75	▼11.6	4	3	▼1
Socialist	26,152	20.90	▲6.2	1	2	▲1
Left Bloc	13,342	10.66	▲6.7	0	1	▲1
Together for the People	8,671	6.93	—	—	0	—
People's	7,536	6.02	▼7.7	1	0	▼1
Unitary Democratic Coalition	4,468	3.57	▼0.1	0	0	0
People–Animals–Nature	2,206	1.76	▲0.1	0	0	0
Democratic Republican	2,144	1.71	—	—	0	—
Labour	1,748	1.40	▼0.7	0	0	0
Earth	1,705	1.36	▼0.4	0	0	0
Portuguese Workers' Communist	1,592	1.27	▼0.1	0	0	0
LIVRE/Time to move forward	1,260	1.01	—	—	0	—
We, the Citizens!	1,125	0.90	—	—	0	—
National Renovator	784	0.63	▲0.2	0	0	0
People's Monarchist	528	0.42	▲0.0	0	0	0
Total valid	120,489	96.31	▼0.3	6	6	0
Blank ballots	1,018	0.81	▼0.4			
Invalid ballots	3,597	2.88	▲0.7			
Total	125,104	100.00				
Registered voters/turnout	255,821	48.90	▼5.4			
Source: Resultados Madeira

=== Portalegre ===
Summary of the 4 October 2015 Assembly of the Republic elections results in Portalegre
Parties	Votes	%	±pp swing	MPs		
Parties	Votes	%	±pp swing	2011	2015	±
Socialist	25,037	42.43	▲10.0	1	1	0
Portugal Ahead (PSD/CDS–PP)	16,303	27.63	▼15.0	1	1	0
Unitary Democratic Coalition	7,184	12.18	▼0.6	0	0	0
Left Bloc	5,427	9.20	▲4.7	0	0	0
Portuguese Workers' Communist	1,001	1.70	▼0.0	0	0	0
People–Animals–Nature	464	0.79	▲0.3	0	0	0
Democratic Republican	326	0.55	—	—	0	—
National Renovator	217	0.37	▲0.2	0	0	0
ACT! (Labour/Socialist Alternative)	198	0.34	—	—	0	—
LIVRE/Time to move forward	189	0.32	—	—	0	—
People's Monarchist	187	0.32	▲0.1	0	0	0
Earth	154	0.26	▼0.0	0	0	0
United Party of Retirees and Pensioners	147	0.25	—	—	0	—
We, the Citizens!	144	0.24	—	—	0	—
Total valid	56,978	96.57	▲0.4	2	2	0
Blank ballots	1,130	1.92	▼0.6			
Invalid ballots	896	1.52	▲0.2			
Total	59,004	100.00				
Registered voters/turnout	101,189	58.31	▲0.4			
Source: Resultados Portalegre

=== Porto ===
Summary of the 4 October 2015 Assembly of the Republic elections results in Porto
Parties	Votes	%	±pp swing	MPs		
Parties	Votes	%	±pp swing	2011	2015	±
Portugal Ahead (PSD/CDS–PP)	380,043	39.59	▼9.5	21	17	▼4
Socialist	314,084	32.72	▲0.7	14	14	0
Left Bloc	106,954	11.14	▲6.0	2	5	▲3
Unitary Democratic Coalition	65,560	6.83	▲0.6	2	3	▲1
People–Animals–Nature	15,295	1.59	▲0.7	0	0	0
Democratic Republican	10,702	1.11	—	—	0	—
Portuguese Workers' Communist	10,290	1.07	▲0.2	0	0	0
LIVRE/Time to move forward	5,014	0.52	—	—	0	—
National Renovator	4,750	0.49	▲0.3	0	0	0
Earth	3,449	0.36	▲0.2	0	0	0
ACT! (Labour/Socialist Alternative)	2,788	0.29	—	—	0	—
We, the Citizens!	2,773	0.29	—	—	0	—
People's Monarchist	2,392	0.25	▲0.1	0	0	0
United Party of Retirees and Pensioners	1,611	0.17	—	—	0	—
Together for the People	1,239	0.13	—	—	0	—
Total valid	926,944	96.56	▲0.3	39	39	0
Blank ballots	18,902	1.97	▼0.5			
Invalid ballots	14,073	1.47	▲0.3			
Total	959,919	100.00				
Registered voters/turnout	1,591,787	60.30	▼2.9			
Source: Resultados Porto

=== Santarém ===
Summary of the 4 October 2015 Assembly of the Republic elections results in Santarém
Parties	Votes	%	±pp swing	MPs		
Parties	Votes	%	±pp swing	2011	2015	±
Portugal Ahead (PSD/CDS–PP)	81,544	35.82	▼14.2	6	4	▼2
Socialist	74,905	32.91	▲7.1	3	3	0
Left Bloc	24,489	10.76	▲5.0	0	1	▲1
Unitary Democratic Coalition	21,941	9.64	▲0.6	1	1	0
Portuguese Workers' Communist	3,060	1.34	▼0.1	0	0	0
People–Animals–Nature	2,715	1.19	▲0.2	0	0	0
Democratic Republican	2,377	1.04	—	—	0	—
LIVRE/Time to move forward	1,236	0.54	—	—	0	—
National Renovator	1,206	0.53	▲0.2	0	0	0
Earth	1,038	0.46	▼0.1	0	0	0
We, the Citizens!	932	0.41	—	—	0	—
ACT! (Labour/Socialist Alternative)	928	0.41	—	—	0	—
United Party of Retirees and Pensioners	827	0.36	—	—	0	—
People's Monarchist	822	0.36	▲0.0	0	0	0
Citizenship and Christian Democracy	491	0.22	—	—	0	—
Total valid	218,511	96.00	▲0.5	10	9	▼1
Blank ballots	5,142	2.26	▼0.7			
Invalid ballots	3,967	1.74	▲0.2			
Total	227,620	100.00				
Registered voters/turnout	393,314	57.87	▼1.1			
Source: Resultados Santarém

=== Setúbal ===
Summary of the 4 October 2015 Assembly of the Republic elections results in Setúbal
Parties	Votes	%	±pp swing	MPs		
Parties	Votes	%	±pp swing	2011	2015	±
Socialist	145,302	34.31	▲7.2	5	7	▲2
Portugal Ahead (PSD/CDS–PP)	95,629	22.59	▼14.6	7	5	▼2
Unitary Democratic Coalition	79,606	18.80	▼0.8	4	4	0
Left Bloc	55,276	13.05	▲6.0	1	2	▲1
People–Animals–Nature	8,167	1.93	▲0.4	0	0	0
Portuguese Workers' Communist	6,721	1.59	▲0.2	0	0	0
LIVRE/Time to move forward	4,277	1.01	—	—	0	—
Democratic Republican	4,124	0.97	—	—	0	—
National Renovator	2,676	0.63	▲0.2	0	0	0
ACT! (Labour/Socialist Alternative)	1,807	0.43	—	—	0	—
United Party of Retirees and Pensioners	1,700	0.40	—	—	0	—
Earth	1,584	0.37	▼0.0	0	0	0
We, the Citizens!	1,572	0.37	—	—	0	—
People's Monarchist	1,024	0.24	▲0.0	0	0	0
Together for the People	561	0.13	—	—	0	—
Total valid	410,056	96.83	▲0.8	17	18	▲1
Blank ballots	7,261	1.71	▼0.8			
Invalid ballots	6,183	1.46	▲0.1			
Total	423,500	100.00				
Registered voters/turnout	726,049	58.33	▼0.9			
Source: Resultados Setúbal

=== Viana do Castelo ===
Summary of the 4 October 2015 Assembly of the Republic elections results in Viana do Castelo
Parties	Votes	%	±pp swing	MPs		
Parties	Votes	%	±pp swing	2011	2015	±
Portugal Ahead (PSD/CDS–PP)	58,509	45.54	▼11.5	4	4	0
Socialist	38,309	29.82	▲3.6	2	2	0
Left Bloc	10,225	7.96	▲3.6	0	0	0
Unitary Democratic Coalition	6,726	5.23	▲0.3	0	0	0
Democratic Republican	2,400	1.87	—	—	0	—
Portuguese Workers' Communist	1,113	0.87	▼0.2	0	0	0
People–Animals–Nature	1,086	0.85	▲0.2	0	0	0
We, the Citizens!	1,037	0.81	—	—	0	—
ACT! (Labour/Socialist Alternative)	959	0.75	—	—	0	—
National Renovator	559	0.44	▲0.2	0	0	0
People's Monarchist	535	0.42	▲0.2	0	0	0
LIVRE/Time to move forward	453	0.35	—	—	0	—
Earth	445	0.35	▲0.1	0	0	0
Citizenship and Christian Democracy	390	0.30	▲0.1	0	0	0
United Party of Retirees and Pensioners	213	0.17	—	—	0	—
Together for the People	160	0.12	—	—	0	—
Total valid	123,119	95.82	▲0.1	6	6	0
Blank ballots	3,228	2.51	▼0.5			
Invalid ballots	2,141	1.67	▲0.4			
Total	128,488	100.00				
Registered voters/turnout	253,219	50.74	▼1.8			
Source: Resultados Viana do Castelo

=== Vila Real ===
Summary of the 4 October 2015 Assembly of the Republic elections results in Vila Real
Parties	Votes	%	±pp swing	MPs		
Parties	Votes	%	±pp swing	2011	2015	±
Portugal Ahead (PSD/CDS–PP)	56,262	51.02	▼9.1	3	3	0
Socialist	36,461	33.06	▲4.0	2	2	0
Left Bloc	5,707	5.18	▲2.9	0	0	0
Unitary Democratic Coalition	3,250	2.95	▼0.1	0	0	0
Portuguese Workers' Communist	1,004	0.91	▲0.3	0	0	0
Democratic Republican	806	0.73	—	—	0	—
People–Animals–Nature	667	0.60	▲0.1	0	0	0
ACT! (Labour/Socialist Alternative)	521	0.47	—	—	0	—
LIVRE/Time to move forward	383	0.35	—	—	0	—
People's Monarchist	316	0.29	▼0.2	0	0	0
Earth	306	0.28	▲0.0	0	0	0
We, the Citizens!	281	0.25	—	—	0	—
National Renovator	279	0.25	▲0.1	0	0	0
United Party of Retirees and Pensioners	151	0.14	—	—	0	—
Total valid	106,394	96.48	▼0.6	5	5	0
Blank ballots	1,919	1.74	▲0.0			
Invalid ballots	1,960	1.78	▲0.6			
Total	110,273	100.00				
Registered voters/turnout	228,497	48.26	▼2.5			
Source: Resultados Vila Real

=== Viseu ===
Summary of the 4 October 2015 Assembly of the Republic elections results in Viseu
Parties	Votes	%	±pp swing	MPs		
Parties	Votes	%	±pp swing	2011	2015	±
Portugal Ahead (PSD/CDS–PP)	97,362	51.05	▼9.7	6	6	0
Socialist	56,543	29.65	▲3.0	3	3	0
Left Bloc	12,816	6.72	▲3.9	0	0	0
Unitary Democratic Coalition	6,668	3.50	▲0.6	0	0	0
Democratic Republican	1,952	1.02	—	—	0	—
Portuguese Workers' Communist	1,743	0.91	▲0.2	0	0	0
People–Animals–Nature	1,296	0.68	▲0.1	0	0	0
LIVRE/Time to move forward	1,003	0.53	—	—	0	—
ACT! (Labour/Socialist Alternative)	721	0.38	—	—	0	—
Earth	679	0.36	▲0.0	0	0	0
National Renovator	608	0.32	▲0.2	0	0	0
We, the Citizens!	534	0.28	—	—	0	—
People's Monarchist	533	0.28	▼0.0	0	0	0
United Party of Retirees and Pensioners	387	0.20	—	—	0	—
Total valid	182,845	95.88	▼0.1	9	9	0
Blank ballots	4,235	2.22	▼0.3			
Invalid ballots	3,632	1.90	▲0.4			
Total	190,712	100.00				
Registered voters/turnout	371,931	51.28	▼2.2			
Source: Resultados Viseu

=== Europe ===
Summary of the 4 October 2015 Assembly of the Republic elections results in Europe
Parties	Votes	%	±pp swing	MPs		
Parties	Votes	%	±pp swing	2011	2015	±
Portugal Ahead (PSD/CDS–PP)	5,340	39.10	▲4.0	1	1	0
Socialist	4,081	29.88	▼10.3	1	1	0
Unitary Democratic Coalition	811	5.94	▲1.4	0	0	0
Left Bloc	785	5.75	▲2.4	0	0	0
LIVRE/Time to move forward	249	1.82	—	—	0	—
Democratic Republican	169	1.24	—	—	0	—
People–Animals–Nature	128	0.94	▼0.2	0	0	0
Portuguese Workers' Communist	98	0.72	▼0.0	0	0	0
United Party of Retirees and Pensioners	96	0.70	—	—	0	—
We, the Citizens!	86	0.63	—	—	0	—
Earth	82	0.60	▲0.0	0	0	0
National Renovator	45	0.33	▲0.0	0	0	0
People's Monarchist	40	0.29	▲0.0	0	0	0
Together for the People	28	0.21	—	—	0	—
ACT! (Labour/Socialist Alternative)	23	0.17	—	—	0	—
Total valid	12,061	88.31	▲1.3	2	2	0
Blank ballots	105	0.77	▼0.1			
Invalid ballots	1,492	10.92	▲1.1			
Total	13,658	100.00				
Registered voters/turnout	78,345	17.43	▼6.5			
Source: Resultados Europa

=== Outside Europe ===
Summary of the 4 October 2015 Assembly of the Republic elections results in Outside Europe
Parties	Votes	%	±pp swing	MPs		
Parties	Votes	%	±pp swing	2011	2015	±
Portugal Ahead (PSD/CDS–PP)	7,122	48.46	▼10.6	2	2	0
We, the Citizens!	2,631	17.90	—	—	0	—
Socialist	1,592	10.83	▼7.1	0	0	0
Democratic Republican	465	3.16	—	—	0	—
People–Animals–Nature	260	1.77	—	—	0	—
Left Bloc	229	1.56	▲0.5	0	0	0
Unitary Democratic Coalition	214	1.46	▲0.6	0	0	0
United Party of Retirees and Pensioners	119	0.81	—	—	0	—
Earth	98	0.67	▲0.1	0	0	0
LIVRE/Time to move forward	83	0.56	—	—	0	—
National Renovator	83	0.56	▲0.2	0	0	0
Together for the People	53	0.36	—	—	0	—
People's Monarchist	52	0.35	▲0.0	0	0	0
Portuguese Workers' Communist	19	0.13	▼0.2	0	0	0
ACT! (Labour/Socialist Alternative)	17	0.12	—	—	0	—
Total valid	13,037	88.71	▲6.1	2	2	0
Blank ballots	80	0.54	▼0.1			
Invalid ballots	1,579	10.74	▼6.0			
Total	14,696	100.00				
Registered voters/turnout	164,507	8.93	▼3.7			
Source: Resultados Fora da Europa
