= Opinion polling for the 2015 Portuguese legislative election =

In the run up to the 2015 Portuguese legislative election, various organisations carried out opinion polling to gauge voting intention in Portugal. Results of such polls are displayed in this article.

The date range for these opinion polls are from the previous general election, held on 5 June 2011, to the day the next election was held, on 4 October 2015.

== Graphical summary ==
View source data.

== Party vote ==
Poll results are listed in the table below in reverse chronological order, showing the most recent first. The highest percentage figure in each polling survey is displayed in bold, and the background shaded in the leading party's colour. In the instance that there is a tie, then no figure is shaded but both are displayed in bold. The lead column on the right shows the percentage-point difference between the two parties with the highest figures. Poll results use the date the survey's fieldwork was done, as opposed to the date of publication.

Exit poll

Polling firm/Link	Fieldwork date	Sample size	PSD/CDS		PS	CDU	BE	MPT	L/TDA	PDR	O	Lead
Polling firm/Link	Fieldwork date	Sample size	PSD	CDS–PP	PS	CDU	BE	MPT	L/TDA	PDR	O	Lead
**2015 legislative election**	4 Oct 2015	55.9	**38.6**; 107		32.3; 86	8.3; 17	10.2; 19	0.4; 0	0.7; 0	1.1; 0	8.4; 1	**6.3**
UCP–CESOP	4 Oct 2015	25,898	**38–43**; 108/116		30–35; 80/88	7–9; 13/17	8–11; 15/23		1; 0/1			8
Eurosondagem	4 Oct 2015	46,626	**36.4–40.2**; 100/108		29.5–33.1; 84/90	6.8–9.0; 15/18	8.1–10.5; 16/19					6.9; 7.1
Intercampus	4 Oct 2015	17,726	**36.8–41.6**; 106/118		29.5–33.9; 77/89	6.7–10.3; 12/20	8.4–12.0; 15/23		– 0/1		8.6–12.2; 0/2	7.3; 7.7
Aximage	4 Oct 2015		**37.6–42.8**		29.7–34.9	7.3–10.5	7.8–11.0				8.6–11.8	7.9
Aximage	26 Sep–1 Oct 2015	1,387	**39.1**		32.5	9.2	9.0				10.2	6.6
UCP–CESOP (Note: Tracking poll.)	26–30 Sep 2015	1,070	**39**		34	10	8				9	5
Intercampus	22–30 Sep 2015	1,013	**37.2**		32.9	8.8	7.9	0.5	0.5	1.7	10.5	4.3
Aximage	29 Sep 2015	200	**40.3**		31.8	8.1	7.1				12.7	8.5
Intercampus	26–29 Sep 2015	1,008	**38.4**		32.1	8.4	7.9				13.2	6.3
UCP–CESOP	25–29 Sep 2015	1,010	**39**		33	11	8				9	6
Eurosondagem	24–29 Sep 2015	2,067	**37.7**; 102/108		32.7; 89/95	9.4; 19/21	6.7; 10/15				13.5; 0/1	5.0
Marktest	22–29 Sep 2015	1,607	**41.0**		28.6	9.3	8.7		0.8	0.7	10.9	12.4
Aximage	28 Sep 2015	200	**39.0**		32.1	8.2	7.1				13.6	6.9
Intercampus	25–28 Sep 2015	1,008	**38.8**		31.6	8.2	7.9				13.5	7.2
UCP–CESOP	24–28 Sep 2015	1,071	**40**		34	10	7				9.0	6.0
Aximage	27 Sep 2015	199	**38.4**		31.8	8.4	7.1				14.3	6.6
UCP–CESOP	26–27 Sep 2015	3,302	**38**; 99/114		32; 78/95	9; 15/20	9; 12/17		1; 0/1	1; 0	10; 0/1	6
Intercampus	24–27 Sep 2015	1,025	**37.9**		32.1	9.1	7.5				13.4	5.8
UCP–CESOP	23–27 Sep 2015	1,075	**41**		34	9	7				9	7
Aximage	26 Sep 2015	200	**37.9**		32.3	8.6	7.0				14.2	5.6
Intercampus	23–26 Sep 2015	1,025	**38.1**		33.0	9.0	6.7				13.2	5.1
UCP–CESOP	22–26 Sep 2015	936	**43**; 117		33; 89	8; 16	7; 8			– 1	9; 0	10
Aximage	25 Sep 2015		**37.7**		32.3						30.0	5.4
Intercampus	22–25 Sep 2015	1,025	**37.5**		32.8	8.9	6.7		0.3	1.1	12.7	4.7
UCP–CESOP	21–25 Sep 2015	1,027	**42**; 113		35; 91	8; 16	7; 8		– 1	– 1	8; 0	7
Aximage	24 Sep 2015		**37.7**		32.6						29.7	5.1
Intercampus	21–24 Sep 2015	1,024	**37.0**		32.3	9.2	6.1			1.1	14.3	4.7
UCP–CESOP	20–24 Sep 2015	1,046	**41**		34	9	7				9	7
Aximage	18–24 Sep 2015	710	**37.9**		32.0	9.0	7.1				14.0	5.9
Aximage	23 Sep 2015	100	**37.0**		33.4	7.6	6.5				15.5	3.6
Intercampus	20–23 Sep 2015	1,017	**37.9**		32.9	7.8	6.0				15.4	5.0
UCP–CESOP	19–23 Sep 2015	891	**40**		35	9	8				8	5
Eurosondagem	17–23 Sep 2015	1,548	35.5; 100/103		**36.0**; 97/102	10.1; 20/22	5.0; 5/7		1.5; 1	1.9; 0/2	10.0; 0	0.5
Aximage	22 Sep 2015	103	**36.3**		34.3	7.9	6.2				15.3	2.0
Intercampus	19–22 Sep 2015	1,007	**38.9**		34.1	8.3	4.8				13.9	4.8
UCP–CESOP	18–22 Sep 2015	828	**40**		34	10	8				8	6
Aximage	21 Sep 2015		**35.9**		34.7						29.4	1.2
Intercampus	18–21 Sep 2015	1,005	**38.9**		35.7	7.3	4.4				13.7	3.2
UCP–CESOP	17–21 Sep 2015	738	**40**		35	8	7				10	5
Aximage	20 Sep 2015		**35.6**		34.8						29.6	0.8
Intercampus	18–20 Sep 2015	733	**40.1**		37.1	6.3	4.0				12.5	3.0
Aximage	19 Sep 2015		**35.6**		34.9						29.5	0.7
UCP–CESOP	16–19 Sep 2015	613	**40**		35	8	7				10	5
Aximage	18 Sep 2015		**35.5**		35.1	8.4	5.7				15.3	0.4
UCP–CESOP	15–18 Sep 2015	678	**40**		34	8	8				10	6
UCP–CESOP	14–17 Sep 2015	647	**41**		34	7	8				10	7
Aximage	13–17 Sep 2015	704	**35.3**		34.7	8.3	5.8				16.0	0.6
Eurosondagem	11–16 Sep 2015	1,867	34.0; 99/102		**35.5**; 95/101	10.3; 20/22	5.2; 6/9		1.8; 1	2.2; 2	11.0; 0	1.5
Aximage	4–7 Sep 2015	602	**38.9**		33.3	8.5	4.6		1.6	1.8	11.3	5.6
Eurosondagem	27 Aug–2 Sep 2015	1,040	35.0		**36.0**	10.4	4.6		1.7	2.3	10.0	1.0
Eurosondagem	29 Jul–4 Aug 2015	1,030	34.8		**36.3**	10.0	5.0		1.7	2.3	9.9	1.5
Aximage	12–16 Jul 2015	607	37.8		**38.0**	7.5	4.0		1.3	1.4	10.0	0.2
Eurosondagem	2–7 Jul 2015	1,025	34.6		**36.7**	10.2	4.8		1.9	2.5	9.3	2.1
Intercampus	26 Jun–4 Jul 2015	1,014	32.7		**37.6**	11.0	6.0	0.9	0.6	0.8	10.4	4.9
Pitagórica	15–21 Jun 2015	523	**36.4**		33.5	10.1	3.6		1.3	1.6	13.5	2.9
UCP–CESOP	13–16 Jun 2015	1,048	**38**		37	10	8				7	1
Eurosondagem	4–9 Jun 2015	1,030	33.3		**36.9**	10.5	4.5		2.0	2.7	10.1	3.6
Aximage	31 May–4 Jun 2015	598	37.2		**38.0**	7.5	4.0		1.2	2.1	10.0	0.8
Eurosondagem	7–12 May 2015	1,021	33.6; 97		**38.1**; 103	10.3; 21	4.8; 6		1.8; 1	2.5; 2	8.9; 0	4.5
Aximage	7–10 May 2015	605	37.2		**37.3**	7.7	4.2		2.0	2.6	9.0	0.1
Eurosondagem	9–15 Apr 2015	1,025	26.7	8.0	**37.5**	10.2	4.3		2.0	2.8	8.5	10.8
Aximage	4–8 Apr 2015	602	30.5	6.0	**36.9**	9.2	3.5		1.7	3.8	8.4	6.4
Eurosondagem	5–10 Mar 2015	1,005	25.2	8.1	**38.1**	9.6	4.4		2.1	3.0	9.5	12.9
Aximage	3–6 Mar 2015	600	28.9	6.1	**36.1**	10.7	4.0		1.6	4.4	8.2	7.2
Eurosondagem	18–25 Feb 2015	1,515	35.0; 98/103		**37.5**; 100/105	9.6; 18/21	4.2; 4		2.1; 1/2	2.5; 2	9.1; 0	2.5
Eurosondagem	18–25 Feb 2015	1,515	27.8; 78/87	7.7; 13/17	**36.5**; 99/105	10.0; 20/21	4.4; 4/6		2.3; 2/3	2.7; 2/3	8.6; 0	8.7
Eurosondagem	5–11 Feb 2015	1,015	26.7	6.9	**38.1**	9.0	4.0		2.2	3.0	10.1	11.4
Aximage	4–8 Feb 2015	608	30.2	5.3	**36.7**	9.2	3.8		2.5	5.2	7.1	6.5
Eurosondagem	8–14 Jan 2015	1,010	26.9	7.9	**37.9**	9.3	3.5		2.0	2.5	10.0	11.0
Aximage	9–12 Jan 2015	601	30.9	4.7	**36.9**	7.7	3.5		3.0	5.2	8.1	6.0
Eurosondagem	4–10 Dec 2014	1,036	25.2	7.3	**37.5**	10.1	3.3		1.7	2.2	12.7	12.3
Aximage	1–4 Dec 2014	607	31.0	5.1	**37.4**	7.6	5.2		2.9	4.1	6.7	6.4
Eurosondagem	6–11 Nov 2014	1,022	25.3	7.7	**36.9**	10.4	3.6	1.0	1.5		13.6	10.6
Aximage	7–10 Nov 2014	603	31.1	5.2	**38.5**	7.9	6.0		2.1	2.1	7.1	7.4
UCP–CESOP	11–13 Oct 2014	1,064	28	4	**45**	10	4				9	17
Eurosondagem	2–7 Oct 2014	1,021	26.2	8.0	**34.8**	10.5	4.0	2.1	1.6		12.8	8.6
Aximage	1–4 Oct 2014	609	27.4	6.1	**40.2**	9.2	7.7			1.1	8.3	12.8
Eurosondagem	4–9 Sep 2014	1,011	28.0	7.5	**33.0**	10.7	4.3	3.3	1.7	Did not exist	11.5	5.0
Aximage	31 Aug–3 Sep 2014	602	28.6	8.4	**30.9**	11.9	5.7			Did not exist	14.5	2.3
Eurosondagem	31 Jul–6 Aug 2014	1,033	27.8	7.0	**32.1**	11.0	4.5	3.6	1.9	Did not exist	12.1	4.3
Pitagórica	25–31 Jul 2014	504 (Note: Hypothesized scenario with António Costa as PS candidate.)	26.8	5.1	**33.9**	13.0	3.1	3.1		Did not exist	15.0	7.1
Pitagórica	25–31 Jul 2014	504 (Note: Hypothesized scenario with António José Seguro as PS candidate.)	28.1	6.9	**30.0**	12.7	4.2	3.5		Did not exist	14.6	1.9
Eurosondagem	3–9 Jul 2014	1,014	27.5	6.6	**32.5**	11.1	4.9	4.0	2.0	Did not exist	11.4	5.0
Aximage	4–7 Jul 2014	593	27.2	8.3	**31.0**	10.7	6.9			Did not exist	15.9	3.8
Eurosondagem	2–5 Jun 2014	1,025	26.1	6.9	**33.0**	11.8	4.8	4.6	2.0	Did not exist	10.8	6.9
Aximage	1–4 Jun 2014	608	24.9	7.8	**32.0**	13.0	6.0			Did not exist	12.7	7.1
Pitagórica	30 May–1 Jun 2014	506	27.5	6.2	**35.2**	13.6	4.4	3.3		Did not exist	9.8	7.7
Pitagórica	30 May–1 Jun 2014	506	28.0	6.3	**30.6**	14.4	4.8	3.7		Did not exist	12.2	2.6
**2014 EP elections**	25 May 2014	33.8	27.7 (84)		**31.5** (93)	12.7 (29)	4.6 (6)	7.1 (15)	2.2 (2)	Did not exist	14.3 (1)	**3.8**
Intercampus	19–24 May 2014	4,004	28.7	2.4	**29.1**	11.4	5.4			Did not exist	23.0	0.4
Aximage	14–22 May 2014	1,507	29.0	7.3	**36.2**	10.3	6.5			Did not exist	10.7	7.2
Eurosondagem	1–7 May 2014	1,005	26.9	8.1	**38.0**	10.4	6.6			Did not exist	10.0	11.1
Aximage	2–5 May 2014	605	30.5	6.8	**36.2**	10.5	6.6			Did not exist	9.4	5.7
UCP–CESOP	12–14 Apr 2014	1,117	30	4	**36**	12	7			Did not exist	11	6
Aximage	9–12 Apr 2014	613	31.5	6.1	**36.1**	11.8	6.4			Did not exist	8.1	4.6
Eurosondagem	3–9 Apr 2014	1,011	25.2	8.1	**37.3**	10.9	7.5			Did not exist	11.0	12.1
Pitagórica	25–29 Mar 2014	506	27.6	7.6	**39.0**	10.3	6.9			Did not exist	8.6	11.4
Eurosondagem	6–12 Mar 2014	1,021	26.6	8.4	**36.6**	11.1	6.9			Did not exist	10.4	10.0
Aximage	8–11 Mar 2014	587	33.3	5.7	**36.8**	11.7	5.4			Did not exist	7.1	3.5
Pitagórica	24 Feb–1 Mar 2014	506	28.4	8.7	**37.2**	10.5	4.9			Did not exist	10.2	8.8
Aximage	9–12 Feb 2014	604	31.4	5.4	**38.1**	9.7	5.7			Did not exist	9.7	6.7
Eurosondagem	6–12 Feb 2014	1,025	25.6	7.7	**36.9**	10.5	7.0			Did not exist	12.3	11.3
Pitagórica	20–24 Jan 2014	506	25.8	7.8	**37.8**	11.4	6.6		Did not exist	Did not exist	10.6	12.0
Eurosondagem	9–15 Jan 2014	1,010	25.0	8.0	**37.5**	10.4	6.6		Did not exist	Did not exist	12.5	12.5
Aximage	7–10 Jan 2014	601	30.6	5.8	**38.5**	9.2	6.3		Did not exist	Did not exist	9.6	7.9
Pitagórica	10–15 Dec 2013	503	25.7	9.0	**36.7**	11.2	6.7	Was not polled	Did not exist	Did not exist	10.7	11.0
Eurosondagem	5–10 Dec 2013	1,035	26.5	8.5	**36.5**	10.0	6.5	Was not polled	Did not exist	Did not exist	12.0	10.0
Aximage	6–9 Dec 2013	609	29.6	8.3	**36.4**	9.7	6.3	Was not polled	Did not exist	Did not exist	9.7	6.8
Marktest	19–21 Nov 2013	800	25.6	1.5	**35.6**	17.2	6.5	Was not polled	Did not exist	Did not exist	13.6	10.0
Aximage	6–9 Nov 2013	602	28.4	9.4	**36.9**	10.3	6.8	Was not polled	Did not exist	Did not exist	8.2	8.5
Eurosondagem	30 Oct–5 Nov 2013	1,005	25.6	8.4	**37.3**	11.1	5.9	Was not polled	Did not exist	Did not exist	11.7	11.7
Marktest	22–25 Oct 2013	803	26.2	2.3	**35.8**	16.6	5.5	Was not polled	Did not exist	Did not exist	13.6	9.6
Aximage	19–22 Oct 2013	607	26.9	12.1	**30.2**	12.4	7.2	Was not polled	Did not exist	Did not exist	11.2	3.3
Pitagórica	14–19 Oct 2013	506	23.7	8.6	**36.7**	13.2	6.6	Was not polled	Did not exist	Did not exist	11.2	13.0
Eurosondagem	2–8 Oct 2013	1,010	26.9	8.6	**36.5**	12.1	5.9	Was not polled	Did not exist	Did not exist	10.0	9.6
**2013 local elections**	29 Sep 2013	52.6	31.4 (87)	3.4 (3)	**36.7** (107)	11.1 (29)	2.4 (4)	0.1 (0)	Did not exist	Did not exist	14.8 (0)	**5.3**
Intercampus	28–29 Sep 2013	1,000	27.0	4.0	**39.0**	11.0	7.0	Was not polled	Did not exist	Did not exist	12.0	12.0
Aximage	26–29 Sep 2013	609	30.2	10.3	**34.5**	10.4	5.6	Was not polled	Did not exist	Did not exist	9.0	4.3
Marktest	17–19 Sep 2013	801	28.5	2.5	**36.6**	11.5	7.3	Was not polled	Did not exist	Did not exist	13.6	8.1
Eurosondagem	5–11 Sep 2013	1,038	26.5	6.5	**38.0**	12.5	6.5	Was not polled	Did not exist	Did not exist	10.0	11.5
Aximage	1–3 Sep 2013	609	28.0	7.6	**35.3**	11.8	6.6	Was not polled	Did not exist	Did not exist	10.7	7.3
Eurosondagem	25–31 Jul 2013	1,020	24.4	7.7	**37.4**	12.5	7.5	Was not polled	Did not exist	Did not exist	10.5	13.0
UCP–CESOP	27–29 Jul 2013	1,096	32	3	**35**	11	7	Was not polled	Did not exist	Did not exist	12	3
Pitagórica	24–28 Jul 2013	507	24.1	8.1	**34.6**	13.1	8.7	Was not polled	Did not exist	Did not exist	11.4	10.5
Marktest	16–18 Jul 2013	804	27.6	5.2	**34.2**	10.8	8.6	Was not polled	Did not exist	Did not exist	13.6	6.6
Aximage	8–11 Jul 2013	603	28.0	5.8	**37.4**	10.5	6.7	Was not polled	Did not exist	Did not exist	11.6	9.4
Eurosondagem	5–10 Jul 2013	1,007	25.0	8.0	**37.0**	12.0	8.0	Was not polled	Did not exist	Did not exist	10.0	12.0
Pitagórica	28 Jun–2 Jul 2013	503	23.7	9.1	**33.9**	13.2	8.9	Was not polled	Did not exist	Did not exist	11.2	10.2
Aximage	4–7 Jun 2013	599	23.2	9.4	**35.5**	11.5	8.4	Was not polled	Did not exist	Did not exist	12.0	12.3
Eurosondagem	30 May–4 Jun 2013	1,028	24.8	7.7	**36.9**	13.0	8.0	Was not polled	Did not exist	Did not exist	9.6	12.1
Marktest	27–30 May 2013	802	25.0	5.6	**34.6**	13.1	8.2	Was not polled	Did not exist	Did not exist	13.5	9.6
Pitagórica	23–28 May 2013	506	25.4	9.5	**32.7**	12.6	9.4	Was not polled	Did not exist	Did not exist	10.4	7.3
Aximage	7–10 May 2013	604	26.2	9.5	**35.5**	9.4	6.9	Was not polled	Did not exist	Did not exist	12.5	9.3
Eurosondagem	2–8 May 2013	1,009	25.9	8.4	**36.0**	12.1	8.8	Was not polled	Did not exist	Did not exist	8.8	10.1
Pitagórica	17–20 Apr 2013	503	26.9	12.0	**28.6**	12.8	8.7	Was not polled	Did not exist	Did not exist	11.0	1.7
Eurosondagem	5–10 Apr 2013	1,025	26.5	8.5	**35.0**	12.5	8.5	Was not polled	Did not exist	Did not exist	9.0	8.5
Aximage	1–4 Apr 2013	601	25.3	9.4	**32.6**	12.0	7.8	Was not polled	Did not exist	Did not exist	12.9	7.3
Pitagórica	19–24 Mar 2013	503	25.7	10.6	**36.7**	11.2	7.9	Was not polled	Did not exist	Did not exist	7.9	11.0
UCP–CESOP	9–11 Mar 2013	949	28	5	**31**	12	8	Was not polled	Did not exist	Did not exist	16	3
Aximage	4–6 Mar 2013	607	25.1	12.1	**31.6**	12.2	7.1	Was not polled	Did not exist	Did not exist	11.9	6.5
Eurosondagem	28 Feb–5 Mar 2013	1,022	27.0	9.0	**35.2**	12.1	8.0	Was not polled	Did not exist	Did not exist	8.7	8.2
Pitagórica	20–24 Feb 2013	503	26.4	10.7	**35.1**	10.7	8.6	Was not polled	Did not exist	Did not exist	8.5	8.7
Aximage	5–8 Feb 2013	602	29.1	8.7	**32.0**	11.5	6.3	Was not polled	Did not exist	Did not exist	12.4	2.9
Eurosondagem	30 Jan–5 Feb 2013	1,011	27.6	9.5	**34.1**	11.6	8.4	Was not polled	Did not exist	Did not exist	8.8	6.5
Pitagórica	22–25 Jan 2013	504	28.6	10.2	**33.8**	12.0	8.0	Was not polled	Did not exist	Did not exist	7.4	5.2
Marktest	15–21 Jan 2013	803	27.9	5.2	**32.6**	12.4	13.3	Was not polled	Did not exist	Did not exist	8.6	4.7
Aximage	6–9 Jan 2013	603	26.3	10.3	**32.9**	11.8	7.4	Was not polled	Did not exist	Did not exist	11.3	6.6
Eurosondagem	3–8 Jan 2013	1,010	26.9	9.6	**34.3**	10.3	8.8	Was not polled	Did not exist	Did not exist	10.1	7.4
Pitagórica	13–18 Dec 2012	511	29.0	11.4	**34.6**	11.2	8.4	Was not polled	Did not exist	Did not exist	5.4	5.6
Eurosondagem	5–11 Dec 2012	1,034	26.4	10.0	**34.0**	11.0	9.0	Was not polled	Did not exist	Did not exist	9.6	7.6
Aximage	4–7 Dec 2012	609	26.8	8.0	**32.9**	11.0	7.6	Was not polled	Did not exist	Did not exist	13.7	6.1
Pitagórica	9–16 Nov 2012	505	26.4	9.8	**36.2**	9.8	7.5	Was not polled	Did not exist	Did not exist	10.2	9.8
Eurosondagem	7–13 Nov 2012	1,033	26.9	10.1	**35.0**	10.0	9.5	Was not polled	Did not exist	Did not exist	8.5	8.1
Aximage	30 Oct–6 Nov 2012	602	26.3	7.9	**32.1**	9.6	7.5	Was not polled	Did not exist	Did not exist	16.6	5.8
Pitagórica	8–13 Oct 2012	503	29.5	8.3	**34.1**	9.1	7.2	Was not polled	Did not exist	Did not exist	11.8	4.6
Eurosondagem	4–9 Oct 2012	1,021	30.0	10.0	**34.8**	9.5	7.7	Was not polled	Did not exist	Did not exist	8.0	4.8
Aximage	1–4 Oct 2012	604	24.9	7.9	**33.7**	9.5	7.0	Was not polled	Did not exist	Did not exist	17.0	8.8
Marktest	17–20 Sep 2012	805	20.2	5.2	**29.6**	10.1	8.6	Was not polled	Did not exist	Did not exist	26.3	9.4
UCP–CESOP	15–17 Sep 2012	1,132	24	7	**31**	13	11	Was not polled	Did not exist	Did not exist	14	7
Eurosondagem	10–13 Sep 2012	1,037	33.0	10.3	**33.7**	9.3	7.0	Was not polled	Did not exist	Did not exist	6.7	0.7
Aximage	3–6 Sep 2012	600	33.3	7.1	**35.4**	7.7	5.3	Was not polled	Did not exist	Did not exist	11.2	2.1
Eurosondagem	9–14 Aug 2012	1,011	**34.1**	10.1	33.0	8.8	6.6	Was not polled	Did not exist	Did not exist	7.4	1.1
Marktest	17–20 Jul 2012	803	**26.7**	4.4	25.8	9.9	6.9	Was not polled	Did not exist	Did not exist	26.3	0.9
Eurosondagem	5–10 Jul 2012	1,036	**34.6**	10.1	32.5	8.7	6.9	Was not polled	Did not exist	Did not exist	7.2	2.1
Aximage	2–4 Jul 2012	600	**35.0**	7.9	30.8	7.8	5.3	Was not polled	Did not exist	Did not exist	13.2	4.2
Marktest	19–22 Jun 2012	800	**31.3**	2.8	29.2	9.5	5.4	Was not polled	Did not exist	Did not exist	21.8	2.1
Eurosondagem	7–12 Jun 2012	1,022	**34.3**	11.6	32.1	9.0	6.9	Was not polled	Did not exist	Did not exist	6.1	2.2
Aximage	4–6 Jun 2012	600	**36.6**	7.5	28.2	10.1	5.0	Was not polled	Did not exist	Did not exist	12.6	8.4
UCP–CESOP	26–28 May 2012	1,366	**36**	6	33	9	9	Was not polled	Did not exist	Did not exist	7	3
Marktest	22–24 May 2012	807	**30.4**	3.5	29.1	9.6	8.5	Was not polled	Did not exist	Did not exist	18.9	1.3
Eurosondagem	10–15 May 2012	1,011	**34.8**	11.6	31.2	8.8	6.0	Was not polled	Did not exist	Did not exist	7.6	3.6
Aximage	2–5 May 2012	600	**36.3**	6.2	28.9	9.7	4.3	Was not polled	Did not exist	Did not exist	14.6	7.4
Marktest	17–21 Apr 2012	810	**31.4**	3.6	25.4	10.2	7.8	Was not polled	Did not exist	Did not exist	21.6	6.0
Eurosondagem	11–17 Apr 2012	1,036	**35.3**	10.7	30.5	9.1	6.4	Was not polled	Did not exist	Did not exist	8.0	4.8
Aximage	3–5 Apr 2012	600	**35.0**	8.7	27.8	10.1	4.0	Was not polled	Did not exist	Did not exist	14.4	7.2
Marktest	19–23 Mar 2012	802	**36.5**	5.2	20.5	7.6	6.3	Was not polled	Did not exist	Did not exist	23.9	16.0
Eurosondagem	8–13 Mar 2012	1,021	**36.0**	12.0	29.6	8.5	6.9	Was not polled	Did not exist	Did not exist	7.0	6.4
Aximage	5–7 Mar 2012	600	**36.2**	6.5	31.4	9.2	2.9	Was not polled	Did not exist	Did not exist	13.8	4.8
Marktest	14–22 Feb 2012	800	**30.2**	3.9	25.9	9.3	6.0	Was not polled	Did not exist	Did not exist	24.7	4.3
Eurosondagem	2–7 Feb 2012	1,010	**35.0**	11.7	30.0	8.5	6.5	Was not polled	Did not exist	Did not exist	8.3	5.0
Aximage	1–4 Feb 2012	600	**37.5**	8.9	30.3	8.8	2.8	Was not polled	Did not exist	Did not exist	11.7	7.2
Marktest	17–22 Jan 2012	800	**37.6**	4.0	25.2	6.1	7.7	Was not polled	Did not exist	Did not exist	19.4	12.4
Eurosondagem	5–10 Jan 2012	1,064	**36.4**	12.1	30.3	7.7	6.4	Was not polled	Did not exist	Did not exist	7.1	6.1
Aximage	3–6 Jan 2012	600	**37.9**	9.3	30.0	10.7	2.5	Was not polled	Did not exist	Did not exist	9.6	7.9
Eurosondagem	7–13 Dec 2011	1,033	**36.0**	12.5	30.0	8.8	6.4	Was not polled	Did not exist	Did not exist	6.3	6.0
Aximage	5–8 Dec 2011	600	**39.5**	9.1	27.7	11.3	3.3	Was not polled	Did not exist	Did not exist	9.1	11.8
Marktest	15–19 Nov 2011	804	**45.4**	5.0	19.7	7.9	4.1	Was not polled	Did not exist	Did not exist	17.9	25.7
Eurosondagem	10–15 Nov 2011	1,025	**36.3**	12.1	29.6	9.0	6.1	Was not polled	Did not exist	Did not exist	6.9	6.7
Aximage	7–10 Nov 2011	600	**41.2**	9.5	26.8	10.6	3.5	Was not polled	Did not exist	Did not exist	8.4	14.4
Eurosondagem	20–25 Oct 2011	1,032	**36.9**	12.5	29.2	8.8	6.3	Was not polled	Did not exist	Did not exist	6.3	7.7
Marktest	18–22 Oct 2011	809	**41.6**	5.3	19.7	10.5	4.2	Was not polled	Did not exist	Did not exist	18.7	21.9
Aximage	3–5 Oct 2011	600	**41.1**	10.2	26.0	7.6	5.0	Was not polled	Did not exist	Did not exist	10.1	15.1
Eurosondagem	22–27 Sep 2011	1,036	**39.3**	12.1	28.2	8.2	5.3	Was not polled	Did not exist	Did not exist	6.9	11.1
Marktest	20–23 Sep 2011	804	**47.1**	6.8	23.3	4.0	2.7	Was not polled	Did not exist	Did not exist	16.1	23.8
UCP–CESOP	10–11 Sep 2011	1,457	**43**	6	33	7	6	Was not polled	Did not exist	Did not exist	5	10
Aximage	7–10 Sep 2011	600	**40.9**	7.1	25.1	9.0	3.2	Was not polled	Did not exist	Did not exist	14.7	15.8
Eurosondagem	26–30 Aug 2011	1,025	**39.6**	12.5	26.9	8.4	5.5	Was not polled	Did not exist	Did not exist	7.1	12.7
Eurosondagem	14–19 Jul 2011	1,022	**40.0**	13.1	26.3	8.0	5.1	Was not polled	Did not exist	Did not exist	7.5	13.7
Aximage	5–8 Jul 2011	600	**42.0**	10.3	24.0	7.5	5.9	Was not polled	Did not exist	Did not exist	10.3	18.0
Eurosondagem	26–28 Jun 2011	1,010	**40.8**	13.6	25.0	7.7	4.8	Was not polled	Did not exist	Did not exist	8.1	15.8
**2011 legislative election**	5 Jun 2011	58.0	**38.7**; 108	11.7; 24	28.0; 74	7.9; 16	5.2; 8	0.4; 0	—N/a	—N/a	7.7; 0	**10.6**

== Constituency polling ==
=== Azores ===
Unlike the rest of the country, in Azores, the PSD and CDS–PP contested the election in separate lists.

Polling firm/Link	Fieldwork date	Sample size	PSD	PS	CDS–PP	BE	CDU	O	Lead	
2015 legislative election	4 Oct 2015	Sample size	41.2	36.1; 2	40.4; 3	3.9; 0	7.8; 0	2.5; 0	9.3; 0	4.3
Norma Açores (Note: Results presented here exclude undecideds (32.6%) and wouldn't answer (11.0%). With their inclusion results are: PSD: 27.6%; PS: 23.6%; CDS–PP: 1.0%; CDU: 0.8%; BE: 0.3%; Others/Invalid: 3.3%.)	15–21 Apr 2015	503	48.8; 3	41.7; 2	1.8; 0	0.5; 0	1.4; 0	5.8; 0	7.1	
2011 legislative election	5 Jun 2011	40.6	47.4; 3	25.7; 2	12.1; 0	4.4; 0	2.5; 0	7.9; 0	21.7	

=== Coimbra ===
Polling firm/Link	Fieldwork date	Sample size	PSD/CDS		PS	CDU	BE	O	Lead
Polling firm/Link	Fieldwork date	Sample size	PSD	CDS–PP	PS	CDU	BE	O	Lead
2015 legislative election	4 Oct 2015	56.3	37.2; 4		35.3; 4	7.0; 0	9.9; 1	10.6; 0	1.9
GTriplo (Note: Results presented here exclude undecideds (51.2%). With their inclusion results are: PàF: 20.6%; PS: 18.8%; CDU: 5.2%; BE: 2.2%; Others/Invalid: 2.0%.)	25–30 Sep 2015	500	42.2; 4		38.5; 4	10.7; 1	4.5; 0	4.1; 0	3.7
2011 legislative election	5 Jun 2011	57.4	40.2; 5	9.9; 1	29.2; 3	6.2; 0	5.7; 0	8.8; 0	11.0

== Leadership polls ==
=== Preferred prime minister ===
Poll results showing public opinion on who would make the best prime minister are shown in the table below in reverse chronological order, showing the most recent first.

==== Passos Coelho vs Costa ====
Polling firm/Link	Fieldwork date	Passos Coelho	Costa	Neither	Both	No opinion	Lead
Aximage	13–17 Sep 2015	39.9	42.5	10.5	0.4	6.7	2.6
Aximage	4–7 Sep 2015	39.4	37.7	21.7	0.8	0.4	1.7
Aximage	12–16 Jul 2015	36.2	40.4	22.6	0.4	0.4	4.2
Intercampus	26 Jun–4 Jul 2015	31.6	42.3	18.0	1.2	6.9	10.7
Aximage	31 May–4 Jun 2015	35.9	43.8	19.9	—N/a	0.4	7.9
Aximage	7–10 May 2015	35.5	43.0	20.6	—N/a	—N/a	7.5
Aximage	4–8 Apr 2015	35.7	42.7	19.8	0.2	1.6	7.0
Aximage	3–6 Mar 2015	35.5	42.8	17.1	2.2	2.4	7.3
Aximage	4–8 Feb 2015	36.1	44.6	10.2	6.7	2.4	8.5
Aximage	9–12 Jan 2015	34.8	48.7	—N/a	—N/a	—N/a	13.9
Aximage	1–4 Dec 2014	33.6	50.0	—N/a	—N/a	—N/a	16.4
Aximage	7–10 Nov 2014	32.4	53.4	—N/a	—N/a	—N/a	21.0
Aximage	1–4 Oct 2014	31.1	56.2	0.1	—N/a	—N/a	25.1
Aximage	31 Aug–3 Sep 2014	32.0	63.0	2.8	0.0	2.2	31.0
Aximage	4–7 Jul 2014	27.3	65.9	1.8	0.2	4.8	38.6
Aximage	1–4 Jun 2014	28.4	62.9	3.9	1.0	3.8	34.5

==== Passos Coelho vs Seguro ====
Polling firm/Link	Fieldwork date	Passos Coelho	Seguro	Neither	Both	No opinion	Lead
Aximage	31 Aug–3 Sep 2014	42.6	40.1	14.5	—N/a	—N/a	2.5
Aximage	4–7 Jul 2014	37.8	47.9	11.6	—N/a	—N/a	10.1
Aximage	1–4 Jun 2014	39.5	43.0	14.5	—N/a	—N/a	3.5
Intercampus	19–24 May 2014	30.0	28.5	35.2	—N/a	6.3	1.5
Aximage	2–5 May 2014	33.7	37.8	27.8	—N/a	—N/a	4.1
Aximage	9–12 Apr 2014	38.4	35.5	25.1	—N/a	—N/a	2.9
Aximage	8–11 Mar 2014	35.5	36.8	26.2	—N/a	—N/a	1.3
Aximage	9–12 Feb 2014	33.7	37.9	26.0	—N/a	—N/a	4.2
Aximage	7–10 Jan 2014	30.4	36.9	30.5	—N/a	—N/a	6.5
Aximage	6–9 Dec 2013	30.1	39.2	27.8	—N/a	—N/a	9.1
Aximage	6–9 Nov 2013	30.8	37.3	30.5	—N/a	—N/a	6.5
Aximage	19–22 Oct 2013	28.7	37.2	32.5	—N/a	—N/a	8.5
Aximage	26–28 Sep 2013	31.8	33.8	32.2	—N/a	—N/a	2.0
Aximage	1–3 Sep 2013	32.7	34.2	31.3	—N/a	—N/a	1.5
Aximage	8–11 Jun 2013	29.7	34.4	33.6	—N/a	—N/a	4.7
Aximage	4–7 Jun 2013	24.0	42.2	31.4	—N/a	—N/a	18.2
Aximage	7–10 May 2013	28.8	40.0	29.0	—N/a	—N/a	11.2
Aximage	1–4 Apr 2013	31.5	33.2	32.6	—N/a	—N/a	1.7
Aximage	4–6 Mar 2013	30.2	35.0	32.1	—N/a	—N/a	4.8
Aximage	5–8 Feb 2013	31.4	31.6	31.6	—N/a	—N/a	0.2
Aximage	6–9 Jan 2013	26.0	34.1	33.3	—N/a	—N/a	8.1
Aximage	4–7 Dec 2012	30.1	33.5	30.3	—N/a	—N/a	3.4
Aximage	30 Oct–6 Nov 2012	28.9	36.0	32.2	—N/a	—N/a	7.1
Aximage	1–4 Oct 2012	28.8	39.1	27.4	—N/a	—N/a	10.3
Aximage	3–6 Sep 2012	36.4	29.8	28.9	—N/a	—N/a	6.6
Aximage	2–4 Jul 2012	36.0	32.8	26.5	—N/a	—N/a	3.2
Aximage	4–6 Jun 2012	39.3	30.6	25.5	—N/a	—N/a	8.7
Aximage	2–5 May 2012	37.1	28.2	28.7	—N/a	—N/a	8.9
Aximage	3–5 Apr 2012	36.7	26.4	27.9	—N/a	—N/a	10.3
Aximage	5–7 Mar 2012	35.2	31.6	—N/a	—N/a	—N/a	3.6
Aximage	1–4 Feb 2012	39.4	27.2	—N/a	—N/a	—N/a	12.2
Aximage	3–6 Jan 2012	47.0	24.1	—N/a	—N/a	—N/a	22.9
Aximage	5–8 Dec 2011	49.2	21.4	—N/a	—N/a	—N/a	27.8
Aximage	7–10 Nov 2011	44.0	22.4	22.6	2.6	8.4	21.6
Aximage	3–5 Oct 2011	47.7	20.3	16.7	3.6	11.7	27.4
Aximage	5–8 Jul 2011	58.5	18.9	5.5	2.0	15.1	39.6

=== Cabinet approval/disapproval ratings ===
Poll results showing public opinion on the performance of the Government are shown in the table below in reverse chronological order, showing the most recent first.

Polling firm/Link	Fieldwork date	Sample size	Pedro Passos Coelho's cabinet				
Polling firm/Link	Fieldwork date	Sample size	Approve	Disapprove	Neither	No opinion	Lead
Eurosondagem	27 Aug–4 Sep 2015	1,040	16.1	40.9	32.4	10.6	8.5
Eurosondagem	29 Jul–4 Aug 2015	1,030	16.2	40.1	34.0	9.7	6.1
Eurosondagem	2–7 Jul 2015	1,025	16.5	40.0	35.6	7.9	4.4
UCP–CESOP	13–16 Jun 2015	1,048	31	63	—N/a	6	32
Eurosondagem	4–9 Jun 2015	1,030	17.2	39.8	33.3	9.7	6.5
Eurosondagem	7–12 May 2015	1,021	16.6	40.2	32.4	10.8	7.8
Eurosondagem	9–15 Apr 2015	1,025	16.5	42.2	30.5	10.8	11.7
Eurosondagem	5–10 Mar 2015	1,005	16.2	43.1	29.7	11.0	13.4
Eurosondagem	5–11 Feb 2015	1,015	16.5	42.7	29.0	11.8	13.7
Eurosondagem	8–14 Jan 2015	1,010	16.7	42.9	28.0	12.4	14.9
Eurosondagem	4–10 Dec 2014	1,036	16.3	42.7	31.4	9.6	11.3
Eurosondagem	6–11 Nov 2014	1,022	16.5	42.4	28.9	12.2	13.5
UCP–CESOP	11–13 Oct 2014	1,064	22	70	—N/a	8	48
Eurosondagem	2–7 Oct 2014	1,021	16.3	41.2	30.7	11.8	10.5
Eurosondagem	4–9 Sep 2014	1,011	18.2	40.6	28.9	12.3	11.7
Eurosondagem	31 Jul–6 Aug 2014	1,033	17.4	41.9	28.6	12.1	13.3
Pitagórica	25–31 Jul 2014	504	21.0	75.4	—N/a	3.6	47.1
Eurosondagem	3–9 Jul 2014	1,014	16.4	42.7	29.0	11.9	13.7
Eurosondagem	2–5 Jun 2014	1,025	14.6	43.9	30.6	10.9	13.3
Pitagórica	30 May–1 Jun 2014	506	23.3	70.4	—N/a	6.3	47.1
Eurosondagem	1–7 May 2014	1,005	16.8	43.1	29.2	10.9	13.9
UCP–CESOP	12–14 Apr 2014	1,117	20	73	—N/a	7	53
Eurosondagem	3–9 Apr 2014	1,011	16.4	43.7	29.9	10.0	13.8
Pitagórica	25–29 Mar 2014	506	22.7	70.8	—N/a	6.5	48.1
Eurosondagem	6–12 Mar 2014	1,021	16.3	46.4	27.5	9.8	18.9
Pitagórica	24 Feb–1 Mar 2014	506	28.4	64.7	—N/a	6.9	36.3
Eurosondagem	6–12 Feb 2014	1,025	16.2	45.5	28.5	9.8	17.0
Pitagórica	20–24 Jan 2014	506	26.4	68.9	—N/a	4.7	42.5
Eurosondagem	9–15 Jan 2014	1,010	16.4	46.1	26.5	11.0	19.6
Pitagórica	10–15 Dec 2013	503	30.4	64.6	—N/a	5.0	34.2
Eurosondagem	5–10 Dec 2013	1,035	15.9	44.9	22.0	17.2	22.9
Eurosondagem	30 Oct–5 Nov 2013	1,005	16.4	44.6	21.4	17.6	23.2
Pitagórica	14–19 Oct 2013	506	16.2	78.0	—N/a	5.8	61.8
Eurosondagem	2–8 Oct 2013	1,010	16.7	44.4	20.7	18.2	23.7
Eurosondagem	5–11 Sep 2013	1,038	17.1	43.2	22.4	17.3	20.8
Eurosondagem	25–31 Jul 2013	1,020	16.2	44.1	23.1	16.6	21.0
UCP–CESOP	27–29 Jul 2013	1,096	17	77	—N/a	6	60
Pitagórica	24–28 Jul 2013	507	22.8	70.6	—N/a	6.5	47.8
Eurosondagem	5–10 Jul 2013	1,007	16.5	43.9	21.7	17.9	22.2
Pitagórica	28 Jun–2 Jul 2013	503	20.3	75.3	—N/a	4.4	55.0
Eurosondagem	30 May–4 Jun 2013	1,028	17.2	43.0	20.7	19.1	22.3
Pitagórica	23–28 May 2013	506	13.1	80.5	—N/a	6.4	67.4
Eurosondagem	2–8 May 2013	1,009	17.5	42.9	21.7	17.9	21.2
Pitagórica	17–20 Apr 2013	503	18.4	77.0	—N/a	4.6	58.6
Eurosondagem	5–10 Apr 2013	1,025	17.6	42.0	24.6	15.8	17.4
Pitagórica	19–24 Mar 2013	503	13.6	83.5	—N/a	2.9	69.9
UCP–CESOP	9–11 Mar 2013	949	17	77	—N/a	6	60
Eurosondagem	28 Feb–5 Mar 2013	1,022	19.6	43.2	26.3	10.9	16.9
Pitagórica	20–24 Feb 2013	503	19.0	74.7	—N/a	6.3	55.7
Eurosondagem	30 Jan–5 Feb 2013	1,011	19.4	42.8	25.4	12.4	17.4
Pitagórica	22–25 Jan 2013	504	21.8	78.2	—N/a	—N/a	56.4
Eurosondagem	3–8 Jan 2013	1,010	18.2	42.9	27.9	11.0	15.0
Pitagórica	13–18 Dec 2012	511	18.9	81.1	—N/a	—N/a	62.2
Eurosondagem	5–11 Dec 2012	1,034	19.5	41.1	29.6	9.8	11.5
Pitagórica	9–16 Nov 2012	503	18.2	81.8	—N/a	—N/a	63.6
Eurosondagem	7–13 Nov 2012	1,033	19.4	39.9	29.0	11.7	10.9
Pitagórica	8–13 Oct 2012	503	18.5	81.5	—N/a	—N/a	63.0
Eurosondagem	4–9 Oct 2012	1,021	19.2	39.2	29.8	11.8	9.4
UCP–CESOP	15–17 Sep 2012	1,132	16	77	—N/a	7	61
Eurosondagem	10–13 Sep 2012	1,037	19.3	38.6	31.4	10.7	7.2
Eurosondagem	9–14 Aug 2012	1,011	19.0	40.0	31.1	9.9	8.9
Eurosondagem	5–10 Jul 2012	1,036	19.3	39.6	30.4	10.7	9.2
Eurosondagem	7–12 Jun 2012	1,022	17.6	37.2	34.3	10.9	2.9
UCP–CESOP	26–28 May 2012	1,366	25	67	—N/a	8	42
Eurosondagem	10–15 May 2012	1,011	18.2	36.0	35.9	9.9	0.1
Eurosondagem	11–17 Apr 2012	1,036	18.9	35.6	37.4	8.1	1.8
Eurosondagem	8–13 Mar 2012	1,021	19.0	33.2	39.6	8.2	6.4
UCP–CESOP	11–12 Feb 2012	978	29	62	—N/a	9	33
Eurosondagem	2–7 Feb 2012	1,010	17.8	27.7	43.5	11.0	15.8
Eurosondagem	5–10 Jan 2012	1,064	19.0	26.7	41.1	13.2	14.4
Eurosondagem	7–13 Dec 2011	1,033	21.5	27.5	40.3	10.7	12.8
Eurosondagem	10–15 Nov 2011	1,025	22.6	26.2	41.3	9.9	15.1
Eurosondagem	20–25 Oct 2011	1,032	24.0	26.1	39.1	10.8	13.0
Eurosondagem	22–27 Sep 2011	1,036	29.0	24.3	35.0	11.7	6.0
UCP–CESOP	10–11 Sep 2011	1,457	32	46	—N/a	22	14
Eurosondagem	26–30 Aug 2011	1,025	30.2	22.0	35.6	12.2	5.4
Eurosondagem	14–19 Jul 2011	1,022	32.6	21.7	31.0	14.7	1.6
