= Results breakdown of the 2011 Portuguese legislative election =

Detailed results by district of the 2011 vote

2011 Portuguese legislative election
- 5 June 2011
- All 230 seats in the Assembly of the Republic; 116 seats needed for a majority
- Turnout: 58.1%
Party	Leader	Vote %	Seats	+/–
PSD	Pedro Passos Coelho	38.7%	108	+27
PS	José Sócrates	28.0%	74	−23
CDS–PP	Paulo Portas	11.7%	24	+3
CDU	Jerónimo de Sousa	7.9%	16	+1
BE	Francisco Louçã	5.2%	8	−8
This lists parties that won seats. See the complete results below.
Prime Minister before	Prime Minister after
José Sócrates; PS	Pedro Passos Coelho; PSD

This is the results breakdown of the Assembly of the Republic election held in Portugal on 5 June 2011. The following tables show detailed results in each of the country's 22 electoral constituencies.

== Electoral system ==
The Assembly of the Republic has 230 members elected to four-year terms. The number of seats to be elected by each district depends on the district magnitude. 226 seats are allocated proportionally by the number of registered voters in the 18 Districts in Mainland Portugal, plus Azores and Madeira, and 4 fixed seats are allocated for overseas voters, 2 seats for voters in Europe and another 2 seats for voters Outside Europe. The 230 members of Parliament are elected using the D'Hondt method and by a closed list proportional representation system. Members represent the country as a whole and not the constituencies in which they were elected.

== Summary ==
=== Nationwide results ===
Summary of the 5 June 2011 Assembly of the Republic election results
Parties	Votes	%	±pp swing	MPs				
Parties	Votes	%	±pp swing	2009	2011	±	%	±
Social Democratic	2,159,181	38.66	▲9.6	81	108	▲27	46.96	▲11.7
Socialist	1,566,347	28.05	▼8.5	97	74	▼23	32.17	▼10.0
People's	653,888	11.71	▲1.3	21	24	▲3	10.43	▲1.3
Unitary Democratic Coalition (Note: Portuguese Communist Party (14 MPs) and "The Greens" (2 MPs).)	441,147	7.90	▲0.0	15	16	▲1	6.96	▲0.4
Left Bloc	288,923	5.17	▼4.6	16	8	▼8	3.48	▼3.5
Portuguese Workers' Communist	62,610	1.12	▲0.2	0	0	0	0.00	0.0
Party for Animals and Nature	57,995	1.04	—N/a	—N/a	0	—N/a	0.00	—N/a
Earth	22,705	0.41	▲0.3	0	0	0	0.00	0.0
Hope for Portugal Movement	21,942	0.39	▼0.1	0	0	0	0.00	0.0
National Renovator	17,548	0.31	▲0.1	0	0	0	0.00	0.0
Labour	16,895	0.30	▲0.2	0	0	0	0.00	0.0
People's Monarchist	14,687	0.26	▼0.0	0	0	0	0.00	0.0
New Democracy	11,806	0.21	▼0.2	0	0	0	0.00	0.0
Portugal Pro-Life	8,209	0.15	0.0	0	0	0	0.00	0.0
Workers Party of Socialist Unity	4,572	0.08	0.0	0	0	0	0.00	0.0
Democratic Party of the Atlantic	4,569	0.08	—N/a	—N/a	0	—N/a	0.00	—N/a
Humanist	3,588	0.06	—N/a	—N/a	0	—N/a	0.00	—N/a
Total valid	5,357,037	95.92	▼1.0	230	230	0	100.00	0.0
Blank ballots	148,618	2.66	▲0.9					
Invalid ballots	79,399	1.42	▲0.1					
Total	5,585,054	100.00						
Registered voters/turnout	9,624,354	58.03	▼1.7					
Source: Comissão Nacional de Eleições

== Results by constituency ==
=== Azores ===
Summary of the 5 June 2011 Assembly of the Republic elections results in Azores
Parties	Votes	%	±pp swing	MPs		
Parties	Votes	%	±pp swing	2009	2011	±
Social Democratic	42,784	47.36	▲11.7	2	3	▲1
Socialist	23,195	25.67	▼14.0	3	2	▼1
People's	10,944	12.11	▲1.8	0	0	0
Left Bloc	3,966	4.39	▼2.9	0	0	0
Unitary Democratic Coalition	2,287	2.53	▲0.3	0	0	0
Party for Animals and Nature	755	0.84	—N/a	—N/a	0	—N/a
Portuguese Workers' Communist	677	0.75	▲0.1	0	0	0
Democratic Party of the Atlantic	371	0.41	—N/a	—N/a	0	—N/a
Earth	315	0.35	▼0.1	0	0	0
People's Monarchist	257	0.28	▼0.0	0	0	0
Hope for Portugal Movement	257	0.28	0.0	0	0	0
Labour	228	0.25	—N/a	—N/a	0	—N/a
National Renovator	149	0.16	—N/a	—N/a	0	—N/a
Total valid	86,185	95.39	▼1.8	5	5	0
Blank ballots	3,250	3.60	▲1.7			
Invalid ballots	912	1.01	▲0.1			
Total	90,347	100.00				
Registered voters/turnout	222,247	40.65	▼3.3			
Source: Resultados Açores

=== Aveiro ===
Summary of the 5 June 2011 Assembly of the Republic elections results in Aveiro
Parties	Votes	%	±pp swing	MPs		
Parties	Votes	%	±pp swing	2009	2011	±
Social Democratic	170,857	44.45	▲9.9	7	8	▲1
Socialist	99,646	25.93	▼7.8	6	5	▼1
People's	49,523	12.89	▼0.1	2	2	0
Left Bloc	19,338	5.03	▼4.0	1	1	0
Unitary Democratic Coalition	15,704	4.09	▲0.3	0	0	0
Portuguese Workers' Communist	3,288	0.86	▲0.1	0	0	0
Party for Animals and Nature	3,044	0.79	—N/a	—N/a	0	—N/a
National Renovator	1,373	0.36	▲0.2	0	0	0
Hope for Portugal Movement	1,319	0.34	▼0.1	0	0	0
Earth	1,289	0.34	—N/a	—N/a	0	—N/a
People's Monarchist	1,044	0.27	▲0.0	0	0	0
Labour	1,002	0.26	—N/a	—N/a	0	—N/a
Portugal Pro-Life	719	0.19	0.0	0	0	0
Democratic Party of the Atlantic	397	0.10	—N/a	—N/a	0	—N/a
Total valid	368,543	95.89	▼1.0	16	16	0
Blank ballots	11,046	2.87	▲1.1			
Invalid ballots	4,757	1.24	▼0.1			
Total	384,346	100.00				
Registered voters/turnout	651,367	59.01	▼1.6			
Source: Resultados Aveiro

=== Beja ===
Summary of the 5 June 2011 Assembly of the Republic elections results in Beja
Parties	Votes	%	±pp swing	MPs		
Parties	Votes	%	±pp swing	2009	2011	±
Socialist	22,308	29.79	▼5.0	2	1	▼1
Unitary Democratic Coalition	19,011	25.39	▼3.5	1	1	0
Social Democratic	17,711	23.65	▲9.0	0	1	▲1
People's	5,462	7.29	▲1.6	0	0	0
Left Bloc	3,890	5.19	▼4.9	0	0	0
Portuguese Workers' Communist	1,980	2.64	▲1.0	0	0	0
Party for Animals and Nature	533	0.71	—N/a	—N/a	0	—N/a
National Renovator	304	0.41	▲0.2	0	0	0
Earth	258	0.34	—N/a	—N/a	0	—N/a
People's Monarchist	231	0.31	▲0.1	0	0	0
Labour	201	0.27	—N/a	—N/a	0	—N/a
Hope for Portugal Movement	189	0.25	▼0.1	0	0	0
Humanist	90	0.12	—N/a	—N/a	0	—N/a
Total valid	72,168	96.38	▼0.9	3	3	0
Blank ballots	1,697	2.27	▲0.8			
Invalid ballots	1,017	1.36	▲0.2			
Total	74,882	100.00				
Registered voters/turnout	135,739	55.17	▼4.2			
Source: Resultados Beja

=== Braga ===
Summary of the 5 June 2011 Assembly of the Republic elections results in Braga
Parties	Votes	%	±pp swing	MPs		
Parties	Votes	%	±pp swing	2009	2011	±
Social Democratic	194,545	40.07	▲9.3	6	9	▲3
Socialist	159,477	32.85	▼8.9	9	7	▼2
People's	50,456	10.39	▲0.7	2	2	0
Unitary Democratic Coalition	23,759	4.89	▲0.3	0	1	0
Left Bloc	20,488	4.22	▼3.6	1	0	▼1
Portuguese Workers' Communist	4,268	0.88	▲0.1	0	0	0
Party for Animals and Nature	2,706	0.56	—N/a	—N/a	0	—N/a
New Democracy	2,338	0.48	▼0.3	0	0	0
Earth	1,968	0.41	—N/a	—N/a	0	—N/a
Hope for Portugal Movement	1,628	0.34	▲0.0	0	0	0
Labour	1,465	0.30	—N/a	—N/a	0	—N/a
People's Monarchist	1,105	0.23	▼0.1	0	0	0
National Renovator	1,092	0.22	▲0.0	0	0	0
Portugal Pro-Life	785	0.16	0.0	0	0	0
Workers Party of Socialist Unity	692	0.14	▲0.0	0	0	0
Democratic Party of the Atlantic	593	0.12	—N/a	—N/a	0	—N/a
Total valid	467,365	96.27	▼1.3	19	19	0
Blank ballots	12,825	2.64	▲1.2			
Invalid ballots	5,270	1.09	▲0.1			
Total	485,460	100.00				
Registered voters/turnout	775,167	62.63	▼2.6			
Source: Resultados Braga

=== Bragança ===
Summary of the 5 June 2011 Assembly of the Republic elections results in Bragança
Parties	Votes	%	±pp swing	MPs		
Parties	Votes	%	±pp swing	2009	2011	±
Social Democratic	39,321	51.99	▲11.4	2	2	0
Socialist	19,736	26.10	▼6.9	1	1	0
People's	8,380	11.08	▼1.5	0	0	0
Unitary Democratic Coalition	1,962	2.59	▲0.2	0	0	0
Left Bloc	1,738	2.30	▼3.9	0	0	0
Portuguese Workers' Communist	416	0.55	▼0.0	0	0	0
Humanist	309	0.41	—N/a	—N/a	0	—N/a
Earth	279	0.37	—N/a	—N/a	0	—N/a
People's Monarchist	246	0.33	▲0.1	0	0	0
Hope for Portugal Movement	226	0.30	▼0.1	0	0	0
Labour	175	0.23	—N/a	—N/a	0	—N/a
National Renovator	162	0.21	▲0.0	0	0	0
Democratic Party of the Atlantic	143	0.19	—N/a	—N/a	0	—N/a
Total valid	73,093	96.65	▼0.4	3	3	0
Blank ballots	1,428	1.89	▲0.6			
Invalid ballots	1,107	1.46	▼0.2			
Total	75,628	100.00				
Registered voters/turnout	153,945	49.13	▼4.6			
Source: Resultados Bragança

=== Castelo Branco ===
Summary of the 5 June 2011 Assembly of the Republic elections results in Castelo Branco
Parties	Votes	%	±pp swing	MPs		
Parties	Votes	%	±pp swing	2009	2011	±
Social Democratic	41,799	37.96	▲8.2	2	2	0
Socialist	38,316	34.80	▼6.2	2	2	0
People's	10,535	9.57	▲1.2	0	0	0
Unitary Democratic Coalition	5,386	4.89	▼0.2	0	0	0
Left Bloc	4,614	4.19	▼4.9	0	0	0
Portuguese Workers' Communist	1,453	1.32	▲0.3	0	0	0
Party for Animals and Nature	765	0.69	—N/a	—N/a	0	—N/a
Labour	544	0.49	—N/a	—N/a	0	—N/a
National Renovator	428	0.39	▲0.2	0	0	0
People's Monarchist	425	0.39	▲0.1	0	0	0
Earth	402	0.37	—N/a	—N/a	0	—N/a
Hope for Portugal Movement	354	0.32	▲0.0	0	0	0
Portugal Pro-Life	215	0.20	▼0.0	0	0	0
Total valid	105,236	95.57	▼0.8	4	4	0
Blank ballots	2,948	2.68	▲1.0			
Invalid ballots	1,934	1.76	▼0.2			
Total	110,118	100.00				
Registered voters/turnout	191,043	57.64	▼3.0			
Source: Resultados Castelo Branco

=== Coimbra ===
Summary of the 5 June 2011 Assembly of the Republic elections results in Coimbra
Parties	Votes	%	±pp swing	MPs		
Parties	Votes	%	±pp swing	2009	2011	±
Social Democratic	91,123	40.17	▲9.6	4	5	▲1
Socialist	66,197	29.18	▼8.7	4	3	▼1
People's	22,389	9.87	▲0.7	1	1	0
Unitary Democratic Coalition	14,112	6.22	▲0.4	0	0	0
Left Bloc	13,033	5.75	▼5.0	1	0	▼1
Party for Animals and Nature	2,531	1.12	—N/a	—N/a	0	—N/a
Portuguese Workers' Communist	2,014	0.89	▼0.2	0	0	0
Hope for Portugal Movement	910	0.40	▼0.1	0	0	0
Earth	662	0.29	—N/a	—N/a	0	—N/a
Labour	600	0.26	▲0.1	0	0	0
National Renovator	591	0.26	▲0.1	0	0	0
People's Monarchist	556	0.25	▼0.1	0	0	0
New Democracy	519	0.23	—N/a	—N/a	0	—N/a
Portugal Pro-Life	335	0.15	—N/a	—N/a	0	—N/a
Total valid	215,572	95.04	▼1.4	10	9	▼1
Blank ballots	8,160	3.60	▲1.3			
Invalid ballots	3,101	1.37	▲0.1			
Total	226,833	100.00				
Registered voters/turnout	395,231	57.39	▼2.8			
Source: Resultados Coimbra

=== Évora ===
Summary of the 5 June 2011 Assembly of the Republic elections results in Évora
Parties	Votes	%	±pp swing	MPs		
Parties	Votes	%	±pp swing	2009	2011	±
Socialist	25,032	29.07	▼5.9	1	1	0
Social Democratic	23,652	27.47	▲8.5	1	1	0
Unitary Democratic Coalition	18,990	22.06	▼0.2	1	1	0
People's	7,513	8.73	▲2.3	0	0	0
Left Bloc	4,230	4.91	▼6.2	0	0	0
Portuguese Workers' Communist	1,804	2.10	▲0.0	0	0	0
Party for Animals and Nature	646	0.75	—N/a	—N/a	0	—N/a
Hope for Portugal Movement	261	0.30	▼0.1	0	0	0
Earth	242	0.28	—N/a	—N/a	0	—N/a
Labour	218	0.25	—N/a	—N/a	0	—N/a
People's Monarchist	208	0.24	▼0.1	0	0	0
National Renovator	173	0.20	▲0.0	0	0	0
Portugal Pro-Life	154	0.18	—N/a	—N/a	0	—N/a
Humanist	90	0.10	—N/a	—N/a	0	—N/a
Total valid	83,213	96.64	▼0.7	3	3	0
Blank ballots	1,839	2.14	▲0.6			
Invalid ballots	1,050	1.22	▲0.1			
Total	86,102	100.00				
Registered voters/turnout	145,929	59.00	▼2.9			
Source: Resultados Évora

=== Faro ===
Summary of the 5 June 2011 Assembly of the Republic elections results in Faro
Parties	Votes	%	±pp swing	MPs		
Parties	Votes	%	±pp swing	2009	2011	±
Social Democratic	74,491	37.03	▲10.9	3	4	▲1
Socialist	46,174	22.95	▼8.9	3	2	▼1
People's	25,561	12.71	▲2.0	1	1	0
Unitary Democratic Coalition	17,233	8.57	▲0.8	0	1	▲1
Left Bloc	16,414	8.16	▼7.2	1	1	0
Party for Animals and Nature	3,304	1.64	—N/a	—N/a	0	—N/a
Portuguese Workers' Communist	3,155	1.57	▲0.2	0	0	0
Earth	2,084	1.04	—N/a	—N/a	0	—N/a
Hope for Portugal Movement	1,086	0.54	▲0.0	0	0	0
National Renovator	1,078	0.54	▲0.1	0	0	0
People's Monarchist	701	0.35	▼0.1	0	0	0
Portugal Pro-Life	642	0.32	▼0.1	0	0	0
Workers Party of Socialist Unity	274	0.14	▼0.1	0	0	0
Total valid	192,197	95.54	▼0.8	8	9	▲1
Blank ballots	6,029	3.00	▲0.7			
Invalid ballots	2,953	1.47	▲0.1			
Total	201,179	100.00				
Registered voters/turnout	360,564	55.80	▼1.5			
Source: Resultados Faro

=== Guarda ===
Summary of the 5 June 2011 Assembly of the Republic elections results in Guarda
Parties	Votes	%	±pp swing	MPs		
Parties	Votes	%	±pp swing	2009	2011	±
Social Democratic	43,016	46.32	▲10.7	2	3	▲1
Socialist	26,294	28.31	▼7.7	2	1	▼1
People's	10,436	11.24	▲0.0	0	0	0
Unitary Democratic Coalition	3,232	3.48	▲0.2	0	0	0
Left Bloc	3,102	3.34	▼4.2	0	0	0
Portuguese Workers' Communist	754	0.81	▲0.3	0	0	0
Party for Animals and Nature	519	0.56	—N/a	—N/a	0	—N/a
Portugal Pro-Life	286	0.31	▲0.0	0	0	0
Earth	247	0.27	—N/a	—N/a	0	—N/a
Hope for Portugal Movement	225	0.24	▼0.1	0	0	0
Labour	200	0.22	▼0.1	0	0	0
Democratic Party of the Atlantic	200	0.22	—N/a	—N/a	0	—N/a
People's Monarchist	189	0.20	▼0.1	0	0	0
National Renovator	178	0.19	—N/a	—N/a	0	—N/a
Total valid	88,878	95.70	▼1.1	4	4	0
Blank ballots	2,242	2.41	▲1.0			
Invalid ballots	1,749	1.88	▲0.1			
Total	92,869	100.00				
Registered voters/turnout	172,396	53.87	▼4.5			
Source: Resultados Guarda

=== Leiria ===
Summary of the 5 June 2011 Assembly of the Republic elections results in Leiria
Parties	Votes	%	±pp swing	MPs		
Parties	Votes	%	±pp swing	2009	2011	±
Social Democratic	116,872	47.00	▲12.0	4	6	▲2
Socialist	51,503	20.71	▼9.5	4	3	▼1
People's	31,819	12.80	▲0.2	1	1	0
Left Bloc	13,351	5.37	▼4.1	1	0	▼1
Unitary Democratic Coalition	12,349	4.97	▼0.1	0	0	0
Party for Animals and Nature	3,009	1.21	—N/a	—N/a	0	—N/a
Portuguese Workers' Communist	2,503	1.01	▲0.2	0	0	0
Hope for Portugal Movement	1,084	0.44	▼0.1	0	0	0
Earth	978	0.39	—N/a	—N/a	0	—N/a
Labour	635	0.26	▲0.1	0	0	0
National Renovator	598	0.24	▲0.0	0	0	0
Portugal Pro-Life	550	0.22	▼0.1	0	0	0
People's Monarchist	450	0.18	▼0.1	0	0	0
Workers Party of Socialist Unity	445	0.18	▲0.0	0	0	0
Total valid	236,146	94.97	▼0.7	10	10	0
Blank ballots	8,585	3.45	▲0.7			
Invalid ballots	3,911	1.57	▲0.1			
Total	248,642	100.00				
Registered voters/turnout	425,014	58.50	▼0.3			
Source: Resultados Leiria

=== Lisbon ===
Summary of the 5 June 2011 Assembly of the Republic elections results in Lisbon
Parties	Votes	%	±pp swing	MPs		
Parties	Votes	%	±pp swing	2009	2011	±
Social Democratic	398,789	34.10	▲9.0	13	18	▲5
Socialist	321,952	27.53	▼8.8	19	14	▼5
People's	161,227	13.78	▲2.8	5	7	▲2
Unitary Democratic Coalition	111,737	9.55	▼0.4	5	5	0
Left Bloc	66,868	5.72	▼5.1	5	3	▼2
Party for Animals and Nature	16,884	1.44	—N/a	—N/a	0	—N/a
Portuguese Workers' Communist	14,398	1.23	▲0.3	0	0	0
Hope for Portugal Movement	6,206	0.53	▼0.3	0	0	0
National Renovator	6,193	0.53	▲0.1	0	0	0
People's Monarchist	4,285	0.37	▲0.1	0	0	0
Earth	4,134	0.35	—N/a	—N/a	0	—N/a
Labour	2,423	0.21	▲0.1	0	0	0
Portugal Pro-Life	1,997	0.17	—N/a	—N/a	0	—N/a
New Democracy	1,952	0.17	▼0.2	0	0	0
Workers Party of Socialist Unity	1,830	0.16	▲0.1	0	0	0
Humanist	1,761	0.15	—N/a	—N/a	0	—N/a
Total valid	1,122,636	95.98	▼0.8	47	47	0
Blank ballots	31,132	2.66	▲0.8			
Invalid ballots	15,830	1.35	▼0.0			
Total	1,169,598	100.00				
Registered voters/turnout	1,880,814	62.19	▲0.3			
Source: Resultados Lisboa

=== Madeira ===
Summary of the 5 June 2011 Assembly of the Republic elections results in Madeira
Parties	Votes	%	±pp swing	MPs		
Parties	Votes	%	±pp swing	2009	2011	±
Social Democratic	68,649	49.39	▲1.2	4	4	0
Socialist	20,401	14.68	▼4.8	1	1	0
People's	19,101	13.74	▲2.6	1	1	0
Left Bloc	5,567	4.00	▼2.1	0	0	0
Unitary Democratic Coalition	5,096	3.67	▼0.5	0	0	0
New Democracy	4,046	2.91	▼0.5	0	0	0
Labour	2,961	2.13	—N/a	—N/a	0	—N/a
Earth	2,561	1.84	▼0.3	0	0	0
Party for Animals and Nature	2,385	1.72	—N/a	—N/a	0	—N/a
Portuguese Workers' Communist	1,968	1.42	▲0.3	0	0	0
National Renovator	573	0.41	▲0.1	0	0	0
People's Monarchist	538	0.39	▼0.1	0	0	0
Hope for Portugal Movement	461	0.33	▼0.1	0	0	0
Total valid	134,307	96.62	▼0.6	6	6	0
Blank ballots	1,655	1.19	▲0.1			
Invalid ballots	3,041	2.19	▲0.5			
Total	139,003	100.00				
Registered voters/turnout	255,928	54.31	▼0.2			
Source: Resultados Madeira

=== Portalegre ===
Summary of the 5 June 2011 Assembly of the Republic elections results in Portalegre
Parties	Votes	%	±pp swing	MPs		
Parties	Votes	%	±pp swing	2009	2011	±
Social Democratic	19,992	32.46	▲8.6	1	1	0
Socialist	19,978	32.43	▼5.9	1	1	0
Unitary Democratic Coalition	7,890	12.81	▼0.1	0	0	0
People's	6,247	10.14	▲2.1	0	0	0
Left Bloc	2,743	4.45	▼6.3	0	0	0
Portuguese Workers' Communist	1,051	1.71	▼0.3	0	0	0
Party for Animals and Nature	333	0.54	—N/a	—N/a	0	—N/a
Hope for Portugal Movement	227	0.37	▲0.2	0	0	0
Earth	176	0.29	—N/a	—N/a	0	—N/a
Labour	162	0.26	—N/a	—N/a	0	—N/a
National Renovator	150	0.24	▲0.0	0	0	0
People's Monarchist	135	0.22	▼0.1	0	0	0
Workers Party of Socialist Unity	81	0.13	▲0.0	0	0	0
Humanist	80	0.13	—N/a	—N/a	0	—N/a
Total valid	59,245	96.18	▼1.0	2	2	0
Blank ballots	1,536	2.49	▲0.9			
Invalid ballots	817	1.33	▲0.1			
Total	61,598	100.00				
Registered voters/turnout	106,444	57.87	▲3.0			
Source: Resultados Portalegre

=== Porto ===
Summary of the 5 June 2011 Assembly of the Republic elections results in Porto
Parties	Votes	%	±pp swing	MPs		
Parties	Votes	%	±pp swing	2009	2011	±
Social Democratic	388,650	39.14	▲10.0	12	17	▲5
Socialist	318,100	32.03	▼9.8	18	14	▼4
People's	99,338	10.00	▲0.7	4	4	0
Unitary Democratic Coalition	61,819	6.23	▲0.5	2	2	0
Left Bloc	50,985	5.13	▼4.1	3	2	▼1
Portuguese Workers' Communist	9,617	0.97	▲0.3	0	0	0
Party for Animals and Nature	9,063	0.91	—N/a	—N/a	0	—N/a
Labour	3,375	0.34	—N/a	—N/a	0	—N/a
Hope for Portugal Movement	2,959	0.30	▼0.1	0	0	0
Earth	2,414	0.24	—N/a	—N/a	0	—N/a
Democratic Party of the Atlantic	2,217	0.22	—N/a	—N/a	0	—N/a
National Renovator	1,552	0.16	▲0.1	0	0	0
New Democracy	1,548	0.16	▼0.0	0	0	0
People's Monarchist	1,524	0.15	▼0.0	0	0	0
Humanist	1,198	0.12	—N/a	—N/a	0	—N/a
Portugal Pro-Life	1,096	0.11	▼0.1	0	0	0
Workers Party of Socialist Unity	539	0.05	▼0.1	0	0	0
Total valid	955,994	96.27	▼1.1	39	39	0
Blank ballots	24,723	2.49	▲1.0			
Invalid ballots	12,289	1.24	▲0.1			
Total	993,006	100.00				
Registered voters/turnout	1,570,611	63.22	▼1.9			
Source: Resultados Porto

=== Santarém ===
Summary of the 5 June 2011 Assembly of the Republic elections results in Santarém
Parties	Votes	%	±pp swing	MPs		
Parties	Votes	%	±pp swing	2009	2011	±
Social Democratic	89,526	37.72	▲10.7	3	5	▲2
Socialist	61,343	25.85	▼7.9	4	3	▼1
People's	29,196	12.30	▲1.1	1	1	0
Unitary Democratic Coalition	21,416	9.02	▼0.3	1	1	0
Left Bloc	13,747	5.79	▼6.1	1	0	▼1
Portuguese Workers' Communist	3,393	1.43	▲0.0	0	0	0
Party for Animals and Nature	2,248	0.95	—N/a	—N/a	0	—N/a
Earth	1,461	0.62	—N/a	—N/a	0	—N/a
Hope for Portugal Movement	1,158	0.49	▲0.1	0	0	0
National Renovator	835	0.35	▲0.1	0	0	0
People's Monarchist	729	0.31	▲0.0	0	0	0
Labour	699	0.29	0.0	0	0	0
New Democracy	580	0.24	▲0.0	0	0	0
Workers Party of Socialist Unity	439	0.18	▲0.1	0	0	0
Total valid	226,770	95.55	▼1.0	10	10	0
Blank ballots	7,056	2.97	▲1.0			
Invalid ballots	3,506	1.48	▲0.1			
Total	237,332	100.00				
Registered voters/turnout	402,597	63.22	▼2.1			
Source: Resultados Santarém

=== Setúbal ===
Summary of the 5 June 2011 Assembly of the Republic elections results in Setúbal
Parties	Votes	%	±pp swing	MPs		
Parties	Votes	%	±pp swing	2009	2011	±
Socialist	114,358	27.14	▼6.9	7	5	▼2
Social Democratic	105,965	25.15	▲8.8	3	5	▲2
Unitary Democratic Coalition	82,816	19.65	▲0.4	4	4	0
People's	50,660	12.02	▲2.9	1	2	▲1
Left Bloc	29,620	7.03	▼7.0	2	1	▼1
Party for Animals and Nature	6,197	1.47	—N/a	—N/a	0	—N/a
Portuguese Workers' Communist	6,109	1.45	▲0.1	0	0	0
Hope for Portugal Movement	1,779	0.42	▲0.0	0	0	0
Earth	1,649	0.39	—N/a	—N/a	0	—N/a
National Renovator	1,581	0.38	—N/a	—N/a	0	—N/a
Portugal Pro-Life	1,184	0.28	▲0.1	0	0	0
Labour	1,126	0.27	▲0.2	0	0	0
People's Monarchist	833	0.20	▼0.1	0	0	0
New Democracy	646	0.15	▼0.1	0	0	0
Workers Party of Socialist Unity	304	0.07	0.0	0	0	0
Total valid	404,827	96.07	▼0.7	17	17	0
Blank ballots	10,742	2.55	▲0.8			
Invalid ballots	5,818	1.38	▼0.1			
Total	421,387	100.00				
Registered voters/turnout	712,133	59.17	▼0.8			
Source: Resultados Setúbal

=== Viana do Castelo ===
Summary of the 5 June 2011 Assembly of the Republic elections results in Viana do Castelo
Parties	Votes	%	±pp swing	MPs		
Parties	Votes	%	±pp swing	2009	2011	±
Social Democratic	58,806	43.59	▲12.3	2	3	▲1
Socialist	35,319	26.18	▼10.1	3	2	▼1
People's	18,219	13.44	▼0.2	1	1	0
Unitary Democratic Coalition	6,645	4.93	▲0.7	0	0	0
Left Bloc	5,925	4.39	▼4.2	0	0	0
Portuguese Workers' Communist	1,471	1.09	▲0.3	0	0	0
Party for Animals and Nature	926	0.69	—N/a	—N/a	0	—N/a
Hope for Portugal Movement	575	0.43	▲0.1	0	0	0
Earth	385	0.29	—N/a	—N/a	0	—N/a
People's Monarchist	328	0.24	▼0.2	0	0	0
Portugal Pro-Life	242	0.18	▼0.1	0	0	0
National Renovator	212	0.16	▲0.1	0	0	0
Democratic Party of the Atlantic	195	0.14	—N/a	—N/a	0	—N/a
Total valid	129,158	95.74	▼1.4	6	6	0
Blank ballots	4,004	2.97	▲1.4			
Invalid ballots	1,740	1.29	▲0.1			
Total	134,902	100.00				
Registered voters/turnout	257,155	52.46	▼2.9			
Source: Resultados Viana do Castelo

=== Vila Real ===
Summary of the 5 June 2011 Assembly of the Republic elections results in Vila Real
Parties	Votes	%	±pp swing	MPs		
Parties	Votes	%	±pp swing	2009	2011	±
Social Democratic	61,462	51.41	▲10.3	3	3	0
Socialist	34,814	29.12	▼6.9	2	2	0
People's	10,373	8.68	▼1.4	0	0	0
Unitary Democratic Coalition	3,662	3.06	▲0.2	0	0	0
Left Bloc	2,801	2.34	▼3.2	0	0	0
Portuguese Workers' Communist	721	0.60	▼0.0	0	0	0
Party for Animals and Nature	582	0.49	—N/a	—N/a	0	—N/a
People's Monarchist	574	0.48	▲0.2	0	0	0
Earth	304	0.25	—N/a	—N/a	0	—N/a
Labour	247	0.21	—N/a	—N/a	0	—N/a
Hope for Portugal Movement	232	0.19	▼0.1	0	0	0
National Renovator	141	0.12	—N/a	—N/a	0	—N/a
Democratic Party of the Atlantic	122	0.10	—N/a	—N/a	0	—N/a
Total valid	116,035	97.06	▼0.3	5	5	0
Blank ballots	2,043	1.71	▲0.4			
Invalid ballots	1,471	1.23	▼0.2			
Total	119,549	100.00				
Registered voters/turnout	235,558	50.75	▼2.8			
Source: Resultados Vila Real

=== Viseu ===
Summary of the 5 June 2011 Assembly of the Republic elections results in Viseu
Parties	Votes	%	±pp swing	MPs		
Parties	Votes	%	±pp swing	2009	2011	±
Social Democratic	98,098	48.38	▲10.9	4	5	▲1
Socialist	54,107	26.69	▼8.0	4	3	▼1
People's	25,090	12.37	▼1.0	1	1	0
Unitary Democratic Coalition	5,816	2.87	▲0.0	0	0	0
Left Bloc	5,786	2.85	▼3.6	0	0	0
Portuguese Workers' Communist	1,459	0.72	▲0.1	0	0	0
Party for Animals and Nature	1,227	0.61	—N/a	—N/a	0	—N/a
Earth	694	0.34	—N/a	—N/a	0	—N/a
People's Monarchist	626	0.31	▲0.2	0	0	0
Hope for Portugal Movement	620	0.31	▼0.1	0	0	0
Labour	467	0.23	—N/a	—N/a	0	—N/a
Democratic Party of the Atlantic	294	0.15	—N/a	—N/a	0	—N/a
National Renovator	267	0.13	▼0.1	0	0	0
Total valid	194,551	95.95	▼0.7	9	9	0
Blank ballots	5,178	2.55	▲1.0			
Invalid ballots	3,025	1.49	▼0.3			
Total	202,754	100.00				
Registered voters/turnout	379,142	53.48	▼2.9			
Source: Resultados Viseu

=== Europe ===
Summary of the 5 June 2011 Assembly of the Republic elections results in Europe
Parties	Votes	%	±pp swing	MPs		
Parties	Votes	%	±pp swing	2009	2011	±
Socialist	7,204	40.16	▼2.9	1	1	0
Social Democratic	5,311	29.61	▲6.0	1	1	0
People's	993	5.54	▲0.8	0	0	0
Unitary Democratic Coalition	803	4.48	▲0.1	0	0	0
Left Bloc	602	3.36	▼1.3	0	0	0
Party for Animals and Nature	192	1.07	—N/a	—N/a	0	—N/a
Portuguese Workers' Communist	132	0.74	▼0.1	0	0	0
Earth	101	0.56	—N/a	—N/a	0	—N/a
Labour	83	0.46	—N/a	—N/a	0	—N/a
Hope for Portugal Movement	55	0.31	▼0.1	0	0	0
People's Monarchist	50	0.28	▼0.0	0	0	0
National Renovator	48	0.27	—N/a	—N/a	0	—N/a
New Democracy	24	0.13	▼0.1	0	0	0
Humanist	19	0.11	—N/a	—N/a	0	—N/a
Total valid	15,617	87.06	▲3.6	2	2	0
Blank ballots	161	0.90	▲0.2			
Invalid ballots	2,161	12.05	▼3.8			
Total	17,939	100.00				
Registered voters/turnout	75,053	23.90	▲0.8			
Source: Resultados Europa

=== Outside Europe ===
Summary of the 5 June 2011 Assembly of the Republic elections results in Outside Europe
Parties	Votes	%	±pp swing	MPs		
Parties	Votes	%	±pp swing	2009	2011	±
Social Democratic	8,323	55.05	▲0.6	2	2	0
Socialist	2,714	17.95	▼4.1	0	0	0
People's	615	4.07	▲0.9	0	0	0
Left Bloc	165	1.09	▼0.9	0	0	0
Unitary Democratic Coalition	127	0.84	▼0.2	0	0	0
Hope for Portugal Movement	125	0.83	▲0.0	0	0	0
New Democracy	123	0.81	▲0.1	0	0	0
Earth	87	0.58	—N/a	—N/a	0	—N/a
National Renovator	64	0.42	▲0.2	0	0	0
Portuguese Workers' Communist	52	0.34	▲0.1	0	0	0
People's Monarchist	47	0.31	▼0.2	0	0	0
Humanist	43	0.28	—N/a	—N/a	0	—N/a
Total valid	12,485	82.57	▼4.2	2	2	0
Blank ballots	99	0.65	▲0.0			
Invalid ballots	2,536	16.77	▲4.1			
Total	15,120	100.00				
Registered voters/turnout	120,056	12.59	▲3.4			
Source: Resultados Fora da Europa
