= (A)TUA =

Pensioners' interest political party in Portugal

(A)TUA (A)TUA
- Abbreviation: A)T
- Leader: Rui Lima
- Founded: 13 July 2015
- Headquarters: Rua Pedrouços, nº. 27, Gabinete 11-E 1400-285 Lisboa (Lisbon)
- Political position: Syncretic
- Assembly of the Republic: 0 / 230

(A)TUA (lit. 'Act') is a Portuguese syncretic political party. Founded in 2015 as the United Party of Retirees and Pensioners (Portuguese: Partido Unido dos Reformados e Pensionistas, PURP) by António Mateus Dias and Fernando Loureiro, it was registered by the Portuguese Constitutional Court on 13 July 2015, initially the party focused on defending Pensioners' interests. It contested the Portuguese legislative election, 2015 and the European Parliament election, 2019.

As PURP the party was generally anti-austerity and populist, positioning itself as a defender of the weak and vulnerable in Portuguese society, which also included people in poor, neglected inland areas. They claimed to be "defending the values of human dignity, freedom, justice and solidarity". Their main goal was to raise minimum pensions to the national minimum wage. Other goals were promoting transparency in the public sector, preventing corruption and cronyism, securing free health and education for ordinary people, non-discrimination on the grounds of age, race, religion and gender and separating political power from economic power.

In 2019, the party tried to run in a coalition with the People's Monarchist Party under the denomination #EstamosJuntos, this coalition was ultimately rejected by the Portuguese Constitutional Court.

The party changed its name and logo in 2024, in order to contest the June European Parliament election with Joana Amaral Dias as the party's candidate, but Amaral Dias decided to run with the support of the National Democratic Alternative (ADN) and (A)TUA dropped out from the EP elections. According to the party principles, most of the Pensioners' interests and anti-austerity platform was dropped for vague Liberal-ish positions regarding taxation, the rule of law and individual freedom.

Former logo as the United Party of Retirees and Pensioners

== Election results ==
=== Assembly of the Republic ===
Election	Leader	Votes	%	Seats	+/-	Government
2015	António Mateus Dias	13,979	0.3 (#15)	0 / 230		No seats
2019	Fernando Loureiro	11,491	0.2 (#17)	0 / 230	0	No seats
2022	List rejected					
2024	Did not contest					
2025	Did not contest					

=== Regional Assemblies ===
Region	Election	Leader	Votes	%	Seats	+/-	Government
Azores	2016	Manuel Borges Moniz	451	0.6 (#8)	0 / 57		No seats
Madeira	2019	Fernando Manuel Teixeira	1,766	1.2 (#8)	0 / 47		No seats
