= Portuguese Labour Party =

Centre-left political party in Portugal

Portuguese Labour Party Partido Trabalhista Português
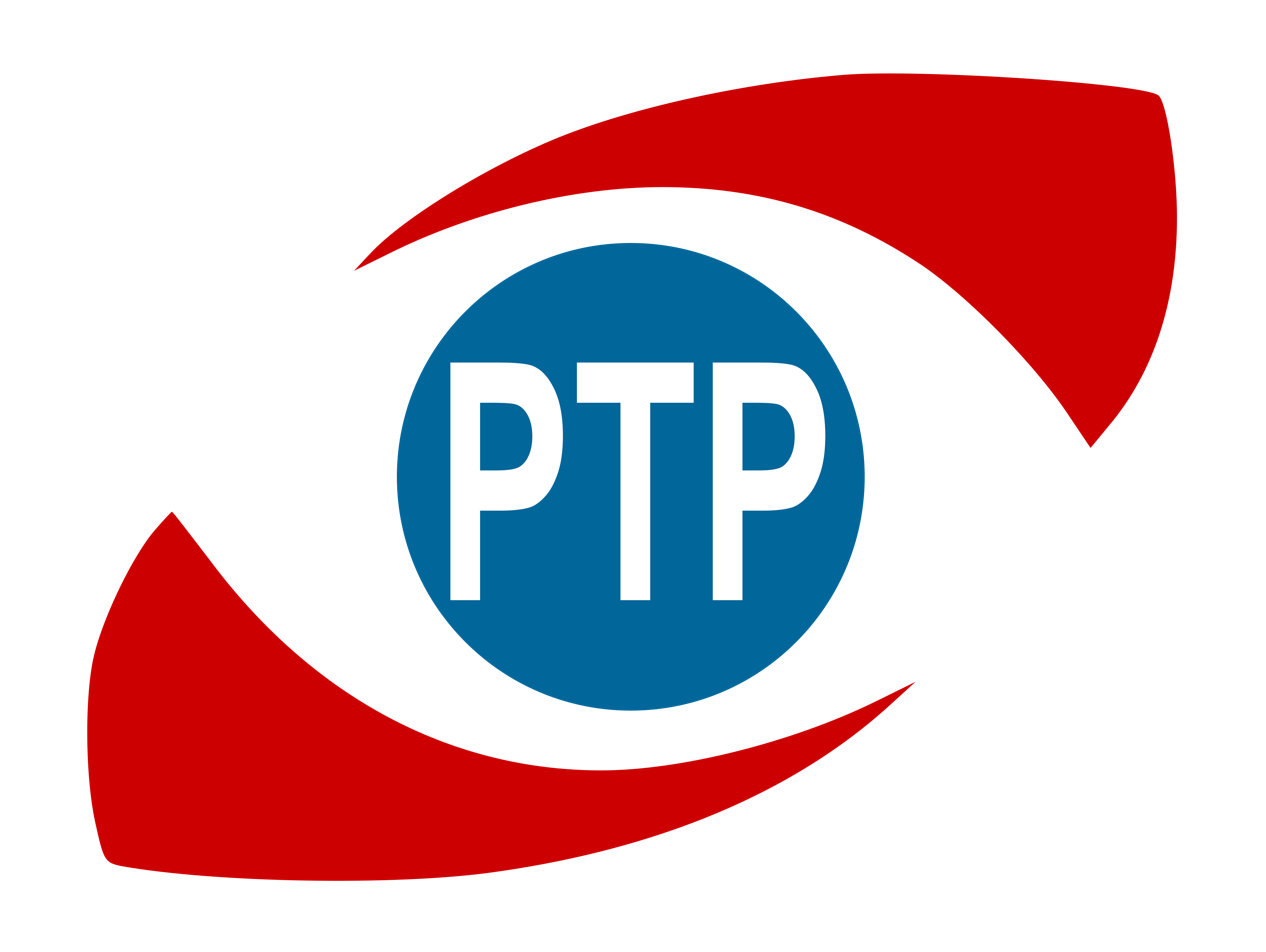
- Abbreviation: PTP
- President: Raquel Coelho
- Vice-President: José Manuel Coelho
- Legalized: 1 July 2009
- Headquarters: Avenida Almirante Reis, n.º 1114, 1.º B, 1150-023 Lisboa
- Youth wing: Juventude Trabalhista
- Ideology: Democratic socialism; Social democracy; Pro-Europeanism
- Political position: Left-wing
- Colours: Red
- Assembly of the Republic: 0 / 230
- Regional parliaments: 0 / 104
- Local government: 0 / 2,078
- European Parliament: 0 / 21

Election symbol
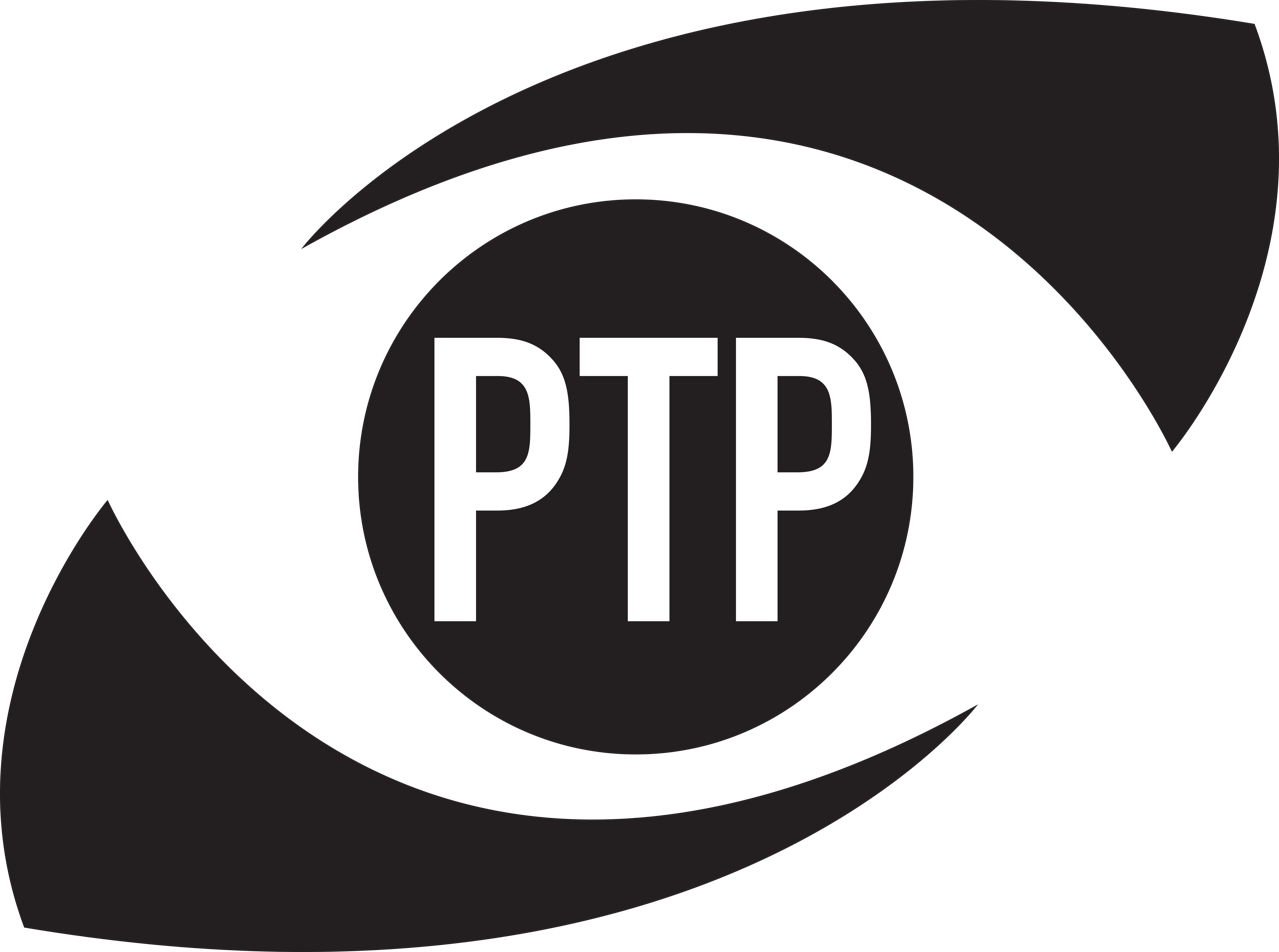

Website
- www.partidotrabalhista.com

The Portuguese Labour Party (Portuguese: Partido Trabalhista Português, PTP) is a Portuguese centre-left political party currently led by Amândio Madaleno. It was recognized by the Portuguese Constitutional Court on 1 July 2009.

It had 3 seats in the Legislative Assembly of Madeira from 2011 to 2015. In the 2015 Madeiran regional election, the party ran on an electoral list with the Socialist Party, the People–Animals–Nature and the Earth Party, in an alliance named Mudança (Change), which elected one PTP deputy.

On 29 May 2025, Raquel Coelho, leader of PTP Madeira and former member of the Madeiran legislative assembly, became the new leader of the PTP. Despite it being a centre-left party, in the 2025 local elections the party's former leader Amândio Madaleno was a candidate for mayor of Pampilhosa da Serra as a Chega candidate.

== Election results ==
=== Assembly of the Republic ===
Election	Leader	Votes	%	Seats	+/-	Government
2009	Amândio Madaleno	4,974	0.1 (#14)	0 / 230		No seats
2011	Amândio Madaleno	16,895	0.3 (#11)	0 / 230	0	No seats
2015	Joana Amaral Dias	AGIR!		0 / 230	0	No seats
2019	Amândio Madaleno	8,299	0.2 (#20)	0 / 230	0	No seats
2022	Amândio Madaleno	4,388	0.1 (#21)	0 / 230	0	No seats
2024	José Manuel Coelho	2,443	0.0 (#18)	0 / 230	0	No seats
2025	Edgar Silva	425	0.0 (#20)	0 / 230	0	No seats

=== European Parliament ===
Election	Leader	Votes	%	Seats	+/–	EP Group
2014	José Manuel Coelho	22,542	0.7 (#10)	0 / 21		–
2019	Gonçalo Madaleno	8,640	0.3 (#16)	0 / 21	0	–
2024	José Manuel Coelho	4,307	0.1 (#16)	0 / 21	0	–

=== Regional Assemblies ===
==== Madeira Regional Parliament ====
Election	Leader	Votes	%	Seats	+/-	Government
2011	José Manuel Coelho	10,115	6.9 (#4)	3 / 47		Opposition
2015	José Manuel Coelho	Change		1 / 47	▼2	Opposition
2019	Raquel Coelho	1,426	1.0 (#10)	0 / 47	▼1	No seats
2023	Quintino Costa	1,369	1.0 (#9)	0 / 47	0	No seats
2024	Raquel Coelho	1,222	0.9 (#10)	0 / 47	0	No seats
2025	Raquel Coelho	Forward Madeira		0 / 47	0	No seats
